= 2007 LG Hockey Games =

Tournament details
- Host countries: Sweden; Russia
- Cities: Stockholm; Moscow
- Venues: 2 (in 2 host cities)
- Dates: 8–11 February 2007
- Teams: 4

Final positions
- Champions: Sweden (9th title)
- Runners-up: Russia
- Third place: Czech Republic
- Fourth place: Finland

Tournament statistics
- Games played: 6
- Goals scored: 33 (5.5 per game)
- Attendance: 48,610 (8,102 per game)
- Scoring leader: (Sweden) Fredrik Bremberg (4 points)

The 2007 LG Hockey Games was played between 8 and 11 February 2007, in Stockholm, Sweden. The Czech Republic, Finland, Sweden and Russia played a round-robin for a total of three games per team and six games in total. Five of the matches were played in the Stockholm Globe Arena in Stockholm, Sweden, and one match in the Mytishchi Arena in Moscow, Russia. The tournament was part of 2006–07 Euro Hockey Tour.

Sweden won the tournament undefeated, after victories against the Czech Republic (6-1), Russia (6-2) and Finland (1-0). The tournament became a major success for Sweden's Johan Davidsson, who scored for points and was also appointed for the tournaments all star-team. The game Sweden-Ryssland also became his 100th international.

== Standings ==
Pos	Team	Pld	W	OTW	SOW	OTL	SOL	L	GF	GA	GD	Pts
1	Sweden	3	3	0	0	0	0	0	13	3	+10	9
2	Russia	3	0	1	1	0	0	1	9	11	−2	4
3	Czech Republic	3	1	0	0	0	1	1	8	9	−1	4
4	Finland	3	0	0	0	1	0	2	3	10	−7	1

Source: swehockey

== Games ==
All times are local. Stockholm – (Central European Time – UTC+1) Moscow – (Eastern European Time – UTC+2)

8 February 2007; 18:00	Russia	4-3 OT (0-1, 0-2, 3-0) (OT: 0–1)	Finland	Mytishchi Arena, Moscow; Attendance: 7,300

Game reference

Konstantin Barulin
Goalies
Mika Noronen
Referee:
(Czech Republic) Martin Homola
Linesmen:
(Russia) Viktor Birin
(Russia) Alexey Medvedev

	0-1	10:37 – Jukka Hentunen (Teemu Aalto, Kimmo Kuhta) (PP)
	0-2	22:42 – Kim Hirschovits (Jani Rita, Sean Bergenheim)
	0-3	25:54 – Kim Hirschovits (Teemu Aalto, Sean Bergenheim)
42:50 – Ilya Nikulin (Vladimir Antipov)	1-3
43.59 – Alexei Kaigorodov (Sergey Mozyakin, Kirill Koltsov)	2-3
51:44– Igor Volkov (Alexei Simakov, Alexei Kaigorodov)	3-3
64:26 – Anton Kuryanov (Kirill Koltsov, Sergey Mozyakin)	4-3

10 min
Penalties
16 min
33
Shots
28

8 February 2007; 19:00	Sweden	6-1 (2-0, 2-1, 2-0)	Czech Republic	Stockholm Globe Arena, Stockholm; Attendance: 8,232

Game reference

Daniel Henriksson
Goalies
Jiri Trvaj
Referee:
(Finland) Sami Partanen
Linesmen:
(Sweden) Fredrik Carlman
(Sweden) Peter Lyth

12:14 – Per Hållberg (Johan Davidsson, Fredrik Bremberg)	1-0
16:32 – Rickard Wallin (Christian Berglund, Johan Åkerman)	2-0
	2-1	33:22 – Jaroslav Balastik (Pavel Rosa, Jan Platil)
36:27 – Jimmie Ölvestad (Mika Hannula, Jörgen Jönsson)	3-1
37:16 – Fredrik Warg (Dick Tärnström, Johan Åkerman)	4-1
57:59 – Patric Hörnqvist (Fredrik Bremberg, Johan Davidsson)	5-1
59:44 – Mika Hannula	6-1

14 min
Penalties
12 min
31
Shots
19

10 February 2007; 12:00	Czech Republic	5-0 (2-0, 1-0, 2-0)	Finland	Stockholm Globe Arena, Stockholm; Attendance: 6,829

Game reference

Marek Pinc
Goalies
Sinuhe Wallinheimo
Referee:
(Sweden) Thomas Andersson
Linesmen:
(Sweden) Daniel Winge
(Sweden) Klas Nilsson

00:54 – Ladislav Kohn (Jaroslav Bednar, Josef Straka)	1-0
19:58 – Josef Straka (Radek Hamr, Ladislav Kohn) (PP)	2-0
35:00 – Pavel Rosa (Radek Hamr, Jaroslav Balastik) (PP)	3-0
41:18 – Jan Hrdina (Pavel Rosa)	4-0
59:59 – Zbyněk Irgl	5-0

8 min
Penalties
24 min
31
Shots
30

10 February 2007; 15:30	Sweden	6-2 (2-0, 1-2, 3-0)	Russia	Stockholm Globe Arena, Stockholm; Attendance: 12,125

Game reference

Joel Gistedt
Goalies
Konstantin Barulin
Referee:
(Czech Republic) Milan Minar
Linesmen:
(Sweden) Anders Karlberg
(Finland) Leo Takula

02:25 – Magnus Johansson (Jörgen Jönsson, Mika Hannula)	1-0
07:41 – Martin Thörnberg (Tony Mårtensson, Fredrik Emvall)	2-0
23:00 – Fredrik Bremberg (Johan Davidsson, Dick Tärnström)	3-0
	3-1	26:52 – Nikolay Kulemin (Sergei Konkov, Maxim Kondratiev)
	3-2	28:04 – Petr Schastliviy (Anton But, Sergei Konkov)
45:03 – Daniel Fernholm (Jörgen Jönsson, Magnus Johansson)	4-2
45:53– Johan Davidsson (Fredrik Bremberg, Patric Hörnqvist)	5-2
54:33 – Tony Mårtensson (Kenny Jönsson)	6-2

30 min
Penalties
16 min
20
Shots
24

11 February 2007; 12:00	Russia	3-2 GWS (0-0, 1-2, 1-0) (OT: 0–0) (SO: 1–0)	Czech Republic	Stockholm Globe Arena, Stockholm; Attendance: 1,236

Game reference

Alexander Yeryomenko
Goalies
Marek Pinc
Referee:
(Sweden) Ulf Rönnmark
Linesmen:
(Sweden) Per Svensson
(Sweden) Peter Sabelström

	0-1	21:34 – Jaroslav Bednar (Josef Straka)
	0-2	26:43 – Jan Platil (Zbynek Irgl) (PP)
33:26 – Anton Kuryanov (Sergey Mozyakin)	1-2
48:28 – Nikolay Kulemin (Ivan Nepryaev, Sergei Konkov)	2-2

Mozyakin
Kulemin (miss)
Bykov
Shootout
(miss) Straka
Marek
(miss) Bednar
10 min
Penalties
18 min
29
Shots
28

11 February 2007; 15:30	Sweden	1-0 (0-0, 1-0, 0-0)	Finland	Stockholm Globe Arena, Stockholm; Attendance: 12,888

Game reference
Daniel Henriksson	Goalies	Mika Noronen	Referee: (Czech Republic) Milan Minar; Linesmen: (Sweden) Anders Karlberg (Sweden) Fredrik Ulriksson
38:08 – Tony Mårtensson (Kenny Jönsson, Fredrik Emvall) / 1-0			Referee: (Czech Republic) Milan Minar; Linesmen: (Sweden) Anders Karlberg (Sweden) Fredrik Ulriksson
16 min	Penalties	18 min	Referee: (Czech Republic) Milan Minar; Linesmen: (Sweden) Anders Karlberg (Sweden) Fredrik Ulriksson
25	Shots	16	Referee: (Czech Republic) Milan Minar; Linesmen: (Sweden) Anders Karlberg (Sweden) Fredrik Ulriksson

== Scoring leaders ==
Pos	Player	Country	GP	G	A	Pts	+/−	PIM	POS
1	Fredrik Bremberg	Sweden	3	1	3	4	+2	0	RW
2	Johan Davidsson	Sweden	3	1	3	4	+2	2	CE
3	Tony Mårtensson	Sweden	3	2	1	3	+1	2	RW
4	Josef Straka	Czech Republic	3	1	2	3	+2	0	CE
5	Pavel Rosa	Czech Republic	3	1	2	3	+1	0	RW

GP = Games played; G = Goals; A = Assists; Pts = Points; +/− = Plus/minus; PIM = Penalties in minutes; POS = Position
Source: swehockey

== Goaltending leaders ==
Pos	Player	Country	TOI	GA	GAA	Sv%	SO
1	Daniel Henriksson	Sweden	119:49	1	0.50	97.14	1
2	Marek Pinc	Czech Republic	125:01	3	1.44	94.92	1
3	Mika Noronen	Finland	133:48	5	2.42	91.38	0
4	Konstantin Barulin	Russia	124:46	9	4.34	81.25	0

TOI = Time on ice (minutes:seconds); SA = Shots against; GA = Goals against; GAA = Goals Against Average; Sv% = Save percentage; SO = Shutouts
Source: swehockey

== Tournament awards ==
The tournament directorate nominated the following players:

- Best goaltender: (Czech Republic) Marek Pinc
- Best defenceman: (Sweden) Kenny Jönsson
- Best forward: (Sweden) Fredrik Bremberg

Media All-Star Team:

- Goaltender: (Czech Republic) Marek Pinc
- Defence: (Sweden) Magnus Johansson, (Sweden) Kenny Jönsson
- Forwards: (Sweden) Fredrik Bremberg, (Sweden) Johan Davidsson, (Russia) Nikolai Kulemin
