= 2006 Karjala Tournament =

Tournament details
- Host countries: Finland; Czechia
- Cities: Helsinki; Prague
- Venues: 2 (in 2 host cities)
- Dates: 9-12 November 2006
- Teams: 4

Final positions
- Champions: Russia (1st title)
- Runners-up: Czech Republic
- Third place: Sweden
- Fourth place: Finland

Tournament statistics
- Games played: 6
- Goals scored: 32 (5.33 per game)
- Attendance: 53,583 (8,931 per game)
- Scoring leader: (Russia) Petr Schastlivy (4 points)

The 2006 Karjala Tournament was played between 9 and 12 November 2006. The Czech Republic, Finland, Sweden and Russia played a round-robin for a total of three games per team and six games in total. Five games were played in Finland and one was played in the Czech Republic. Russia won the tournament before the Czech Republic and Sweden, while Finland finished fourth. The tournament was part of the 2006-07 Euro Hockey Tour.

== Standings ==
Pos	Team	Pld	W	OTW	SOW	OTL	SOL	L	GF	GA	GD	Pts
1	Russia	3	2	0	1	0	0	0	11	8	+3	8
2	Czech Republic	3	1	0	0	0	1	1	8	9	−1	4
3	Sweden	3	1	0	0	0	0	2	9	10	−1	3
4	Finland	3	1	0	0	0	0	2	4	5	−1	3

Source: flashscore

== Games ==
Helsinki – (Eastern European Time – UTC+2) Prague – (Central European Time – UTC+1)

9 November 2006; 18:00	Finland	2-3 (0-2, 2-0, 0-1)	Russia	Hartwall Areena, Helsinki; Attendance: 7,968

Game reference

Jani Hurme
Goalies
Vassili Koshechkin
Referee:
(Sweden) Ulf Rönnmark
Linesmen:
(Finland) Mikko Kekäläinen
(Finland) Jussi Terho

	0-1	01:41 – Andrei Kuteykin (Denis Grebeshkov, Pavel Vorobiev) (PP)
	0-2	13:14 – Ivan Nepryaev (Maksim Kondratiev)
25:41 – Janne Niskala (Esa Pirnes, Tomi Kallio) (PP)	1-2
27:42 – Esa Pirnes (Mika Pyörälä, Marko Kiprusoff) (PP)	2-2
	2-3	42:06 – Piotr Schastlivy (Pavel Vorobiev)

14 min
Penalties
35 min
29
Shots
18

9 November 2006; 18:30	Czech Republic	5-4 (0-0, 2-2, 3-2)	Sweden	Sazka Arena, Prague; Attendance: 11,704

Game reference

Roman Cechmanek
Goalies
Johan Backlund
Referee:
(Russia) Anatoli Zakharov
Linesmen:
(Czech Republic) Petr Kalivoda
(Czech Republic) Roman Pouzar

24:20 – Martin Cech (Ivan Huml) (PP)	1-0
	1-1	34:17 – Niklas Nordgren (Johan Davidsson, Jörgen Jönsson)
37:14 – Jaroslav Hlinka (Ivan Huml, Petr Sykora)	2-1
	2-2	37:46 Jimmie Ölvestad (Jonathan Hedström, Rickard Wallin)
40:41 Pavel Brendl (Josef Straka, Petr Sykora) (PP)	3-2
53:32 – Jiri Simanek (Tomas Divisek)	4-2
56:18 – Vaclav Varada (Vaclav Skuhravy)	5-2
	5-3	59:32 – Anton Strålman (Christian Berglund) (PP)
	5-4	59:47 – Jan Sandström (Fredrik Lindgren, Tobias Enström) (PP)

11 November 2006; 13:00	Russia	5-4 (0-1, 1-1, 4-2)	Sweden	Hartwall Areena, Helsinki; Attendance: 5,500

Game reference

Aleksandr Eremenko
Goalies
Erik Ersberg
Referee:
(Finland) Sami Partanen
Linesmen:
(Finland) Antti Orelma
(Finland) Stefan Fonselius

	0-1	16:31 – Magnus Johansson (Johan Davidsson) (PP)
	0-2	37:56 – Oscar Steen (Jimmie Ölvestad)
39:30 – Pavel Vorobiev (Timofei Shishkanov)	1-2
42:06 – Timofei Shishkanov (Ivan Nepryaev)	2-2
	2-3	46:16 – Johan Davidsson (Per Hållberg, Jörgen Jönsson) (PP)
47:06 – Piotr Schastlivy (Denis Grebeshkov)	3-3
50:24 – Piotr Schastlivy (Sergei Konkov)	4-3
50:36 – Ivan Nepryaev (Igor Volkov, Timofei Shishkanov)	5-3
	5-4	51:09 – Mathias Månsson (Magnus Johansson, Joakim Eriksson)

12 min
Penalties
12 min
32
Shots
22

11 November 2006; 17:30	Finland	2-1 (0-0, 1-0, 1-1)	Czech Republic	Hartwall Areena, Helsinki (PP); Attendance: 11,808

Game reference

Sinuhe Wallinheimo
Goalies
Roman Cechmanek
Referee:
(Russia) Aleksandr Poliakov
Linesmen:
(Finland) Antti Hämäläinen
(Finland) Mikko Kekäläinen

36:10 – Sean Bergenheim (Antti-Jussi Niemi, Petri Pakaslahti)	1-0
50:58 – Petri Kontiola (Jani Rita, Riku Hahl)	2-0
	2-1	59:59 – Josef Straka (Vaclav Varada, Petr Sykora)

26 min
Penalties
42 min
22
Shots
30

12 November 2006; 14:00	Czech Republic	2-3 GWS (1-0, 0-0, 1-2) (OT: 0–0) (SO: 0–1)	Russia	Hartwall Areena, Helsinki; Attendance: 6,210

Game reference

Roman Cechmanek
Goalies
Vasili Koshechkin
Referee:
(Finland) Jyri Rönn
Linesmen:
(Finland) Antti Hämäläinen
(Finland) Jussi Terho

07:58 – Petr Caslava	1-0
	1-1	40:27 – Aleksandr Kharitonov (Vladimir Antipov, Albert Leshchev) (PP)
50:21 – Ivan Huml (Petr Caslava)	2-1
	2-2	58:04 – Piotr Schastlivy (Pavel Vorobiev, Maksim Kondratiev)

Straka
Brendl (miss)
Hlinka (miss)
Shootout
Kuryanov (miss)
Kharitonov
Kulemin
16 min
Penalties
12 min
27
Shots
36

12 November 2006; 17:30	Finland	0-1 (0-0, 0-1, 0-0)	Sweden	Hartwall Areena, Helsinki; Attendance: 10,393

Game reference
Sinuhe Wallinheimo	Goalies	Johan Backlund	Referee: (Russia) Aleksandr Poliakov; Linesmen: (Finland) Stefan Fonselius (Finland) Seppo Lindroos
0-1 / 22:39 – Johan Davidsson (Dick Tärnström, Jonathan Hedström)			Referee: (Russia) Aleksandr Poliakov; Linesmen: (Finland) Stefan Fonselius (Finland) Seppo Lindroos
12 min	Penalties	12 min	Referee: (Russia) Aleksandr Poliakov; Linesmen: (Finland) Stefan Fonselius (Finland) Seppo Lindroos
23	Shots	24	Referee: (Russia) Aleksandr Poliakov; Linesmen: (Finland) Stefan Fonselius (Finland) Seppo Lindroos

== Scoring leaders ==
Pos	Player	Country	GP	G	A	Pts	+/−	PIM	POS
1	Petr Schastlivy	Russia	3	4	0	4	+4	0	LW
2	Johan Davidsson	Sweden	3	2	2	4	+2	2	CE
3	Pavel Vorobyev	Russia	3	0	4	4	+4	2	RW
4	Ivan Nepryaev	Russia	3	2	1	3	+4	8	CE
5	Ivan Huml	Czech Republic	3	1	2	3	+2	0	LW

GP = Games played; G = Goals; A = Assists; Pts = Points; +/− = Plus/minus; PIM = Penalties in minutes; POS = Position
Source: swehockey

== Goaltending leaders ==
Pos	Player	Country	TOI	GA	GAA	Sv%	SO
1	Sinuhe Wallinheimo	Finland	119:35	2	1.00	96.30	0
2	Vasily Koshechkin	Russia	125:00	4	1.92	92.86	0
3	Roman Čechmánek	Czech Republic	118:58	6	3.03	XX.XX	0
4	Johan Backlund	Sweden	120:00	5	2.50	88.89	1

TOI = Time on ice (minutes:seconds); SA = Shots against; GA = Goals against; GAA = Goals Against Average; Sv% = Save percentage; SO = Shutouts
Source: swehockey

== Tournament awards ==
The tournament directorate named the following players in the tournament 2006:

- Best goaltender: (Finland) Sinuhe Wallinheimo
- Best defenceman: (Sweden) Magnus Johansson
- Best forward: (Russia) Petr Schastlivy
