= 2006 Channel One Cup =

2006 Rosno Cup
Tournament details
- Host countries: Russia; Finland
- Cities: Moscow; Helsinki
- Venues: 2 (in 2 host cities)
- Dates: 14–17 December 2006
- Teams: 4

Final positions
- Champions: Russia (10th title)
- Runners-up: Finland
- Third place: Sweden
- Fourth place: Czech Republic

Tournament statistics
- Games played: 6
- Goals scored: 29 (4.83 per game)
- Attendance: 52,610 (8,768 per game)
- Scoring leader: (Czech Republic) Jan Marek (4 points)

Awards
- MVP: (Russia) Petr Schastlivy

The 2006 Channel One Cup was played between 14 and 17 December 2006. The Czech Republic, Finland, Sweden and Russia played a round-robin for a total of three games per team and six games in total. Five of the matches were played in the Khodynka Arena in Moscow, Russia, and one match in Helsinki Ice Hall in Helsinki, Finland. The tournament was part of the 2006–07 Euro Hockey Tour.

Russia won the tournament before Finland.

== Standings ==
Pos	Team	Pld	W	OTW	SOW	OTL	SOL	L	GF	GA	GD	Pts
1	Russia	3	2	0	0	0	1	0	7	2	+5	7
2	Finland	3	2	0	0	0	0	1	5	6	−1	6
3	Sweden	3	1	0	1	0	0	1	9	7	+2	5
4	Czech Republic	3	0	0	0	0	0	3	8	14	−6	0

Source: swehockey

== Games ==
All times are local. Moscow – (Eastern European Time – UTC+4) Helsinki – (Eastern European Time – UTC+2)

14 December 2006; 18:30	Finland	3-2 (1-0, 2-2, 0-0)	Czech Republic	Helsinki Ice Hall, Helsinki; Attendance: 4,910

Game reference

Ari Ahonen
Goalies
Milan Hnilička
Referee:
(Sweden) Patrik Sjöberg
Linesmen:
(Finland) Mikko Kekäläinen
(Finland) Antti Lajunen

Pesonen (Kontiola, Pyörälä) (PP) – 12:41	1-0
Pyörälä (Kontiola) – 23:16	2-0
	2-1	23:54 – Marek (Bednář)
	2-2	28:38 – Josef Straka (Kroupa, Čáslava) (PP)
Pesonen (Puistola, Kontiola) – 38:04	3-2

14 min
Penalties
14 min
37
Shots
21

14 December 2006; 20:00	Russia	0-1 GWS (0-0, 0-0, 0-0) (OT: 0–0) (SO: 0–1)	Sweden	Khodynka Arena, Moscow; Attendance: 10,000

Game reference
Vasily Koshechkin	Goalies	Erik Ersberg	Referee: (Finland) Jari Levonen
Morozov (miss); Kharitonov (miss); Kulemin (miss)	Shootout	(miss) Åkerman; Mårtensson; (miss) Wallin	Referee: (Finland) Jari Levonen
10 min	Penalties	22 min	Referee: (Finland) Jari Levonen
31	Shots	24	Referee: (Finland) Jari Levonen

16 December 2006; 14:00	Russia	3-0 (0-0, 1-0, 2-0)	Finland	Khodynka Arena, Moscow; Attendance: 13,400

Game reference

Vasily Koshechkin
Goalies
Petri Vehanen
Referee:
(Russia) Anatoli Zakharov

Schastlivy (SHG) – 35:12	1-0
Nikulin (Leshchyov, Proshkin) – 37:06	2-0
Morozov (Leshchyov, Zaripov) (PP) – 59:00	3-0

12 min
Penalties
14 min
36
Shots
18

16 December 2006; 18:00	Sweden	7-5 (3-1, 2-3, 2-1)	Czech Republic	Khodynka Arena, Moscow; Attendance: 4,300

Game reference

Daniel Henriksson
Goalies
Adam Svoboda
Referee:
(Russia) Anatoli Zakharov

Fernholm (Ledin) – 04:11	1-0
Mårtensson (Petrasek, Emvall) (PP) – 11:34	2-0
Lindström (Åkerman, Nordström) (PP) – 15:26	3-0
	3-1	15:45 – Marek (Čáslava)
Enström (Emwall, Petrasek) (PP) – 26:32	4-1
	4-2	26:56 – Hořava (Mikeska, Čáslava)
Enström (Petrasek, Mårtensson) (PP) – 29:42	5-2
	5-3	36:32 – Kroupa (Marek, Kutlák)
	5-4	37:40 – Marek (Bednář, Hamr) (PP)
Fabricius (Petrasek, Mårtensson) (PP) – 50:54	6-4
	6-5	55:08 – Straka (Šimánek, Čáslava)
Fabricius (Emwall) – 59:30	7-5

24 min
Penalties
32 min
33
Shots
33

17 December 2006; 14:00	Russia	4-1 (0-0, 2-0, 2-1)	Czech Republic	Khodynka Arena, Moscow; Attendance: 13,400

Game reference

Alexander Yeryomenko
Goalies
Milan Hnilička
Referee:
(Finland) Jari Levonen
Linesmen:
(Russia) Aleksei Anisimov
(Russia) Aleksei Romashko

Schastlivy (Volkov, Atyushov) – 21:25	1-0
Morozov (Zaripov) (PP) – 32:44	2-0
Kulemin (Konkov, Nepryaev) – 45:19	3-0
Morozov (Leshchyov, Proshkin) (PP) – 49:50	4-0
	4-1	51:24 – Bednář

20 min
Penalties
34 min
26
Shots
18

17 December 2006; 18:00	Finland	2-1 (1-0, 1-1, 0-0)	Sweden	Khodynka Arena, Moscow; Attendance: 6,600

Game reference

Ari Ahonen
Goalies
Erik Ersberg
Referee:
(Russia) Sergei Karabanov

Hirschovits (Karalahti, Söderholm) (PP) – 12:44	1-0
	1-1	31:10 – Åkerman (Lindström, Eriksson) (PP)
Pesonen (Pyörälä) – 39:35	2-1

28 min
Penalties
18 min
30
Shots
15

== Scoring leaders ==
Pos	Player	Country	GP7	G	A	Pts	+/−	PIM	POS
1	Jan Marek	Czech Republic	3	3	1	4	+3	8	CE
2	Tony Mårtensson	Sweden	3	2	2	4	0	0	RW
3	Petr Čáslava	Czech Republic	3	0	4	4	+3	0	LD
4	David Petrasek	Russia	3	0	4	4	0	0	LD
5	Janne Pesonen	Finland	3	3	0	3	+2	0	RW

TOI = Time on ice (minutes:seconds); SA = Shots against; GA = Goals against; GAA = Goals Against Average; Sv% = Save percentage; SO = Shutouts
Source: swehockey

== Goaltending leaders ==
Pos	Player	Country	TOI	GA	GAA	Sv%	SO
1	Vasily Koshechkin	Russia	125:01	1	0.48	97.62	1
2	Erik Ersberg	Sweden	124:30	2	0.96	96.72	1
3	Ari Ahonen	Finland	120:00	3	1.50	91.67	0
4	Adam Svoboda	Czech Republic	116:24	10	5.15	82.46	0

TOI = Time on ice (minutes:seconds); SA = Shots against; GA = Goals against; GAA = Goals Against Average; Sv% = Save percentage; SO = Shutouts
Source: swehockey

== Tournament awards ==
Best players selected by the directorate:

- Best goalkeeper: (Russia) Vasily Koshechkin
- Best defenceman: (Sweden) Johan Åkerman
- Best forward: (Finland) Janne Pesonen
- Most Valuable Player: (Russia) Petr Schastlivy

Media All-Star Team:

- Goaltender: (Russia) Vasily Koshechkin
- Defence: (Russia) Ilya Nikulin, (Sweden) David Petrasek
- Forwards: (Czech Republic) Jan Marek, (Russia) Petr Schastlivy, (Russia) Alexei Morozov
