= 2006–07 Euro Hockey Tour =

Tournament details
- Dates: 31 August 2006 – 1 April 2007
- Teams: 4

Final positions
- Champions: Sweden (2nd title)
- Runners-up: Russia
- Third place: Czech Republic
- Fourth place: Finland

Tournament statistics
- Games played: 28
- Goals scored: 129 (4.61 per game)
- Attendance: 201,439 (7,194 per game)
- Scoring leader: (Sweden) Johan Davidsson (12 points)

The 2006–07 Euro Hockey Tour was the 11th season of the Euro Hockey Tour. The season consisted of four tournaments, the Česká Pojišťovna Cup, Karjala Tournament, Channel One Cup, and the LG Hockey Games. The top two teams met in the final, and the third and fourth place teams met for the third place game.

== Standings ==
Pos	Team	Pld	W	OTW	SOW	OTL	SOL	L	GF	GA	GD	Pts
1	Russia	12	6	1	3	0	1	1	39	30	+9	27
2	Sweden	12	6	0	1	0	1	4	40	29	+11	21
3	Finland	12	4	0	0	1	1	6	19	29	−10	14
4	Czech Republic	12	2	0	1	0	2	7	31	41	−10	10

== Česká Pojišťovna Cup ==
The tournament was played between 31 August – 3 September 2006. Five of the matches were played in Liberec, Czech Republic and one match in Linköping, Sweden. The tournament was won by Russia.

Pos	Team	Pld	W	OTW	OTL	L	GF	GA	GD	Pts
1	Russia	3	2	1	0	0	12	9	+3	8
2	Finland	3	1	0	1	1	7	8	−1	4
3	Sweden	3	1	0	1	1	9	9	0	4
4	Czech Republic	3	0	1	0	2	7	9	−2	2

Source: swehockey

31 August 2006
Czech Republic	2–1 (GWS)	Finland
Sweden	3–4 (GWS)	Russia
2 September 2006
Finland	3–4	Russia
Czech Republic	2–4	Sweden
3 September 2006
Sweden	2–3	Finland
Czech Republic	3-4	Russia

== Karjala Tournament ==
The tournament was played between 9–12 November 2006. Five of the matches were played in Helsinki, Finland and one match in Prague, Czech Republic. The tournament was won by Russia.

Pos	Team	Pld	W	OTW	SOW	OTL	SOL	L	GF	GA	GD	Pts
1	Russia	3	2	0	1	0	0	0	11	8	+3	8
2	Czech Republic	3	1	0	0	0	1	1	8	9	−1	4
3	Sweden	3	1	0	0	0	0	2	9	10	−1	3
4	Finland	3	1	0	0	0	0	2	4	5	−1	3

Source: flashscore

9 November 2006
Finland	2–3	Russia
Czech Republic	5–4	Sweden
11 November 2006
Russia	5–4	Sweden
Finland	2–1	Czech Republic
12 November 2006
Czech Republic	2–3 (GWS)	Russia
Finland	0-1	Sweden

== Channel One Cup ==
The tournament was played between 14 and 17 December 2006. Five of the matches were played in Moscow, Russia and one match in Helsinki, Finland. The tournament was won by Russia.

Pos	Team	Pld	W	OTW	SOW	OTL	SOL	L	GF	GA	GD	Pts
1	Russia	3	2	0	0	0	1	0	7	2	+5	7
2	Finland	3	2	0	0	0	0	1	5	6	−1	6
3	Sweden	3	1	0	1	0	0	1	9	7	+2	5
4	Czech Republic	3	0	0	0	0	0	3	8	14	−6	0

Source: swehockey

14 December 2006
Finland	3–2	Czech Republic
Russia	0–1 (GWS)	Sweden
16 December 2006
Russia	3–0	Finland
Sweden	7–5	Czech Republic
17 December 2006
Russia	4–1	Czech Republic
Finland	2-1	Sweden

== LG Hockey Games ==
The tournament was played between 8–11 February 2007. Five of the matches were played in Stockholm, Sweden and one match in Moscow, Russia. The tournament was won by Sweden.

Pos	Team	Pld	W	OTW	SOW	OTL	SOL	L	GF	GA	GD	Pts
1	Sweden	3	3	0	0	0	0	0	13	3	+10	9
2	Russia	3	0	1	1	0	0	1	9	11	−2	4
3	Czech Republic	3	1	0	0	0	1	1	8	9	−1	4
4	Finland	3	0	0	0	1	0	2	3	10	−7	1

Source: swehockey

8 February 2007
Russia	4–3 (OT)	Finland
Sweden	6–1	Czech Republic
10 February 2007
Czech Republic	5–0	Finland
Sweden	6–2	Russia
11 February 2007
Russia	3–2 (GWS)	Czech Republic
Sweden	1-0	Finland

== Final tournament ==
=== Third place series ===
19 April 2007; 17:30	Finland	1–0 (1-0, 0-0, 0-0)	Czech Republic	Helsinki Ice Hall, Helsinki; Attendance: 4,610

Game reference
Fredrik Norrena	Goalies	Marek Pinc	Referee: (Sweden) Marcus Vinnerborg; Linesman: (Finland) Mikko Kekäläinen
P. Kontiola – 00:22 / 1-0			Referee: (Sweden) Marcus Vinnerborg; Linesman: (Finland) Mikko Kekäläinen
8 min	Penalties	6 min	Referee: (Sweden) Marcus Vinnerborg; Linesman: (Finland) Mikko Kekäläinen
20	Shots	28	Referee: (Sweden) Marcus Vinnerborg; Linesman: (Finland) Mikko Kekäläinen

21 April 2007; 17:30	Czech Republic	2-0 OT (0-0, 1-0, 0-0) (OT: 1–0)	Finland	Sazka Arena, Prague; Attendance: 7,475

Game reference
Roman Čechmánek	Goalies	Sinuhe Wallinheimo
P. Sýkora – 38:07 (PP); J. Hlinka – 63:30 / Goals
8 min	Penalties	18 min
30	Shots	12

=== Final series ===
19 April 2007; 19:30	Sweden	3–2 (0-0, 1-1, 2-1)	Russia	Läkerol Arena, Gävle; Attendance: 7,636

Game reference

Johan Backlund
Goalies
Vasily Koshechkin
Referee:
(Finland) Jyri Rönn
Linesmen:
(Sweden) Anders Karlberg
(Finland) Leo Takula

	0-1	23:54 – A. Mikhnov
A. Steen – 30:58	1-1
J. Davidsson – 47:15 (PP)	2-1
	2-2	52:27 – P. Schastliviy (PP)
J. Jönsson – 55:32	3-2

16 min
Penalties
14 min
29
Shots
20

21 April 2007; 19:30	Russia	2–4 (0-1, 1-1, 1-2)	Sweden	Khodynka Arena, Moscow; Attendance: 8,970

Game reference

Vasily Koshechkin
Goalies
Daniel Henriksson
Referee:
(Czech Republic) Milan Minar

	0-1	06:01 – F. Bremberg
	0-2	28:31 – J. Davidsson
S. Mozyakin – 29:00	1-2
	1-3	40:46 – A. Steen (SHG)
A. Morozov – 43:46	2-3
	2-4	59:36 – M. Thörnberg 59:36

16 min
Penalties
18 min
21
Shots
30
