= Nepryaev =

Nepryaev (Russian: Непряев) is a Russian masculine surname, its feminine counterpart is Nepryaeva. Notable people with the surname include:

- Ivan Nepryaev (born 1982), Russian ice hockey forward
- Natalya Nepryayeva (born 1995), Russian cross-country skier
