= Johan Backlund =

Swedish ice hockey player

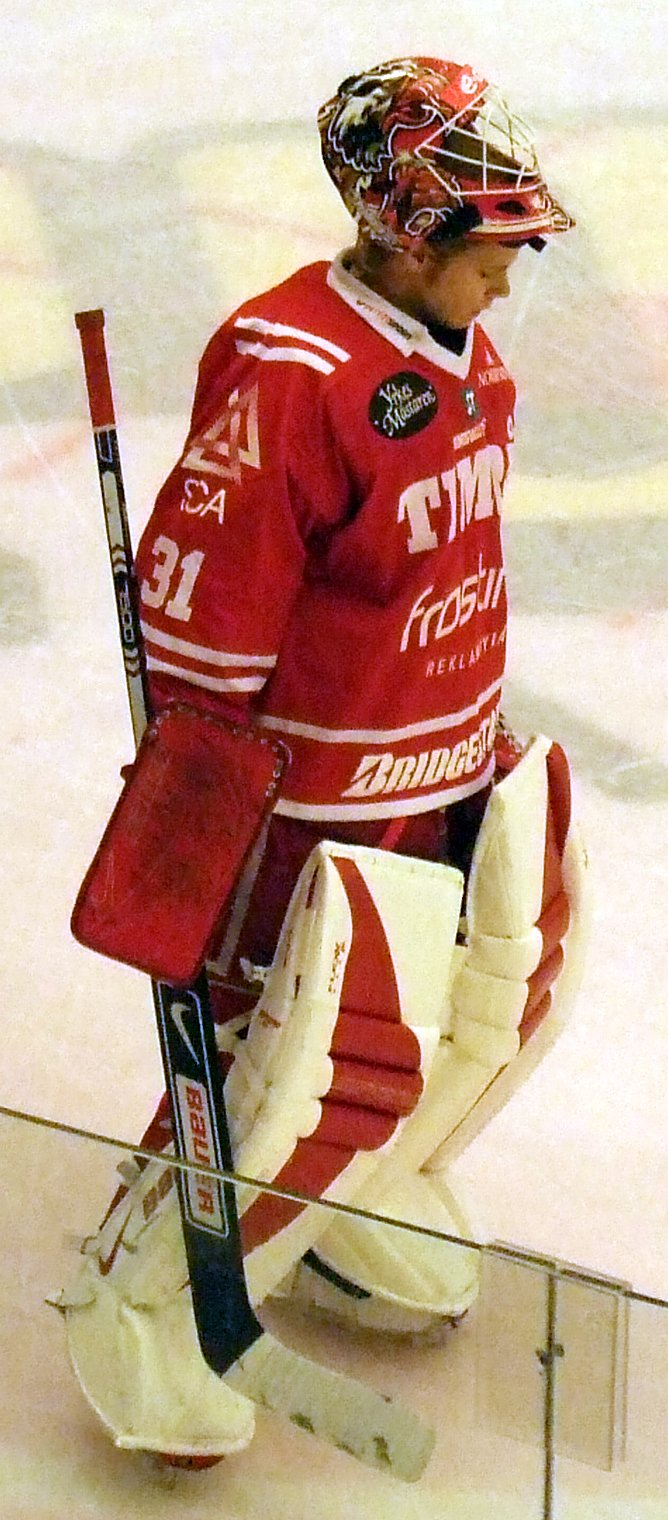
- Backlund in 2007
- Born: July 24, 1981 (age 45) Skellefteå, Sweden
- Height: 6 ft 2 in (188 cm)
- Weight: 198 lb (90 kg; 14 st 2 lb)
- Position: Goaltender
- Caught: Left
- Played for: Skellefteå AIK; Leksands IF; Timrå IK; Philadelphia Flyers; Oulun Kärpät; HC Vityaz; HC Slovan Bratislava
- National team: Sweden
- NHL draft: Undrafted
- Playing career: 1999–2016

Johan Backlund (born July 24, 1981) is a Swedish former professional ice hockey goaltender. He played one regular season game and one playoff game in the National Hockey League (NHL) with the Philadelphia Flyers during the 2009–10 season. The rest of his career, which lasted from 1999 to 2016, was mainly spent in the Swedish Hockey League. Internationally Backlund played for the Swedish national team at the 2007 World Championship.

== Playing career ==
On March 26, 2009, Backlund signed a one-year two-way contract with the Philadelphia Flyers.

After the 2009 training camp he was sent to the Adirondack Phantoms as Ray Emery and Brian Boucher were slated to be the Flyers goaltending tandem for the 2009-10 NHL season. Backlund was called up briefly in early October when Brian Boucher was injured but did not play before being returned to the Phantoms. After a moderate start he earned his first shutout on North American ice against the Syracuse Crunch on November 1, 2009.

On March 27, 2010, Backlund made his NHL debut against the Pittsburgh Penguins. He allowed 2 goals on 24 shots, but had to exit the game after 2 periods, having reaggravated a groin injury. The Flyers lost the game 4-1, and he got the losing decision.

On June 11, 2010, Backlund signed a two-year contract extension with the Flyers.

== International play ==
Backlund played for the Swedish national team at the 2007 World Championship. In 6 games he had 4 wins and 2 losses, while Sweden finished fourth overall.

== Career statistics ==
=== Regular season and playoffs ===
			Regular season										Playoffs
Season	Team	League	GP	W	L	T	OTL	MIN	GA	SO	GAA	SV%	GP	W	L	MIN	GA	SO	GAA	SV%
1999–00	Skellefteå AIK	J20	4	—	—	—	—	190	7	0	2.21	.921	—	—	—	—	—	—	—	—
1999–00	Skellefteå AIK	SWE-2	12	—	—	—	—	679	32	1	2.83	.881	—	—	—	—	—	—	—	—
2000–01	Skellefteå AIK	SWE-2	29	—	—	—	—	1719	76	2	2.65	.892	2	—	—	117	9	0	2.65	.892
2001–02	Skellefteå AIK	SWE-2	28	—	—	—	—	1605	83	2	3.10	.885	6	—	—	361	18	0	2.99	.904
2002–03	Skellefteå AIK	SWE-2	33	—	—	—	—	1951	68	8	2.09	.918	5	—	—	298	9	0	1.81	.917
2003–04	Leksands IF	SEL	29	9	19	0	—	1707	92	1	3.23	.894	—	—	—	—	—	—	—	—
2003–04	Leksands IF	J20	2	—	—	—	—	120	2	1	1.00	.975	—	—	—	—	—	—	—	—
2004–05	Leksands IF	SWE-2	22	17	3	1	—	1302	39	1	1.80	.917	—	—	—	—	—	—	—	—
2004–05	Leksands IF	J20	1	—	—	—	—	60	3	0	3.00	.833	—	—	—	—	—	—	—	—
2005–06	Leksands IF	SEL	32	9	17	—	4	1843	81	1	2.64	.915	—	—	—	—	—	—	—	—
2006–07	Timrå IK	SEL	49	24	20	—	4	2835	106	6	2.24	.912	7	3	4	444	16	0	2.16	.912
2007–08	Timrå IK	SEL	47	21	21	—	2	2794	107	6	2.30	.908	11	6	5	662	27	1	2.45	.913
2008–09	Timrå IK	SEL	49	24	20	—	4	2840	121	4	2.56	.907	5	2	3	317	18	0	3.41	.890
2009–10	Philadelphia Flyers	NHL	1	0	1	—	0	40	2	0	3.00	.917	1	0	0	2	0	0	0.00	—
2009–10	Adirondack Phantoms	AHL	41	21	17	—	2	2451	114	2	2.79	.906	—	—	—	—	—	—	—	—
2010–11	Adirondack Phantoms	AHL	33	10	19	—	3	1900	104	0	3.28	.890	—	—	—	—	—	—	—	—
2011–12	Adirondack Phantoms	AHL	1	0	0	—	0	31	0	0	0.00	1.000	—	—	—	—	—	—	—	—
2011–12	Trenton Titans	ECHL	1	0	0	—	1	65	1	0	0.92	.960	—	—	—	—	—	—	—	—
2011–12	Oulun Kärpät	FIN	18	9	6	—	4	1127	47	0	2.36	.927	9	5	3	519	22	0	2.54	.931
2012–13	Oulun Kärpät	FIN	34	13	11	—	9	1974	74	3	2.25	.913	3	1	1	151	8	0	3.18	.893
2013–14	HC Vityaz	KHL	16	3	9	—	2	921	50	0	3.26	.893	—	—	—	—	—	—	—	—
2014–15	HC Slovan Bratislava	KHL	36	9	17	—	6	2066	91	2	2.64	.900	—	—	—	—	—	—	—	—
2015–16	Skellefteå AIK	J20	2	—	—	—	—	120	—	—	2.50	.853	—	—	—	—	—	—	—	—
2015–16	Skellefteå AIK	SHL	2	1	1	—	0	118	2	1	1.02	.958	1	0	1	43	2	0	2.79	.818
NHL totals			1	0	1	—	0	40	2	0	3.00	.917	1	0	0	2	0	0	0.00	—
SEL/SHL totals			208	88	98	0	14	12019	507	18	2.53	.908	24	11	13	1466	63	1	2.58	—

=== International ===
Year	Team	Event	GP	W	L	T	MIN	GA	SO	GAA	SV%
2007	Sweden	WC	6	4	2	0	360	12	2	2.01	.907
Senior totals			6	4	2	0	360	12	2	2.01	.907
