= Jimmie Ölvestad =

Swedish ice hockey player

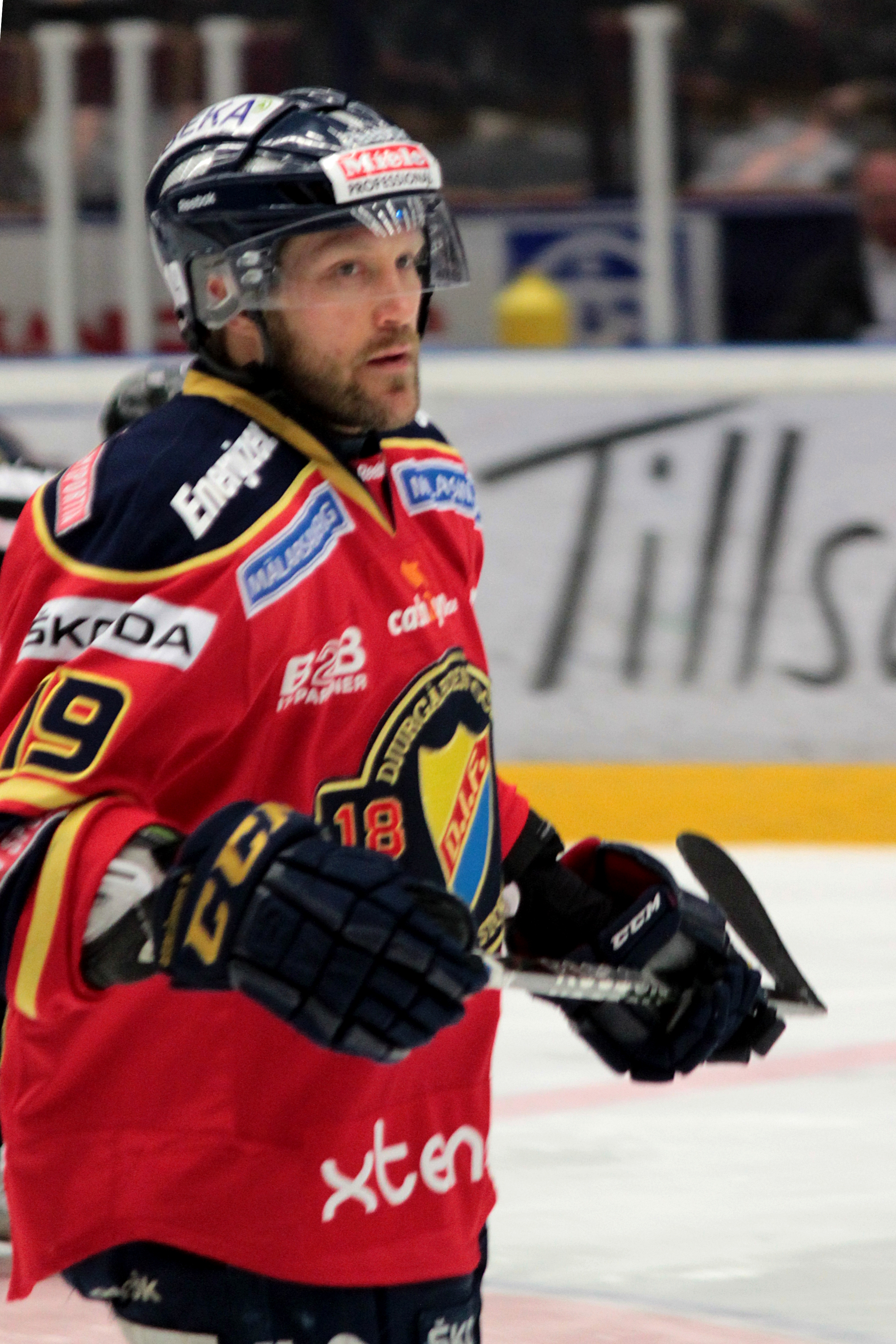
- Born: 16 February 1980 (age 46) Stockholm, Sweden
- Height: 6 ft 1 in (185 cm)
- Weight: 194 lb (88 kg; 13 st 12 lb)
- Position: Left wing
- Shot: Left
- Played for: Tampa Bay Lightning
- NHL draft: 88th overall, 1999; Tampa Bay Lightning
- Playing career: 1998–2013

Jimmie Glenn Ölvestad (born February 16, 1980) is a Swedish former professional ice hockey right wing. He was drafted in the third round, 88th overall, by the Tampa Bay Lightning in the 1999 NHL entry draft.

== Playing career ==
Ölvestad had played three seasons in Sweden for Djurgårdens IF before coming to the NHL in the 2001–02 season to play for the Lightning. After three seasons in North America, during which he appeared in 111 NHL games with the Lightning, Ölvestad returned to Djurgårdens IF during the 2004–05 NHL lockout. While the NHL resumed play in the 2005–06 season, Ölvestad decided to remain in Sweden. He made his 500th appearance for Djurgårdens IF against Modo Hockey 3 March 2012. On 27 June 2013, Ölvestad officially announced his retirement. Ölvestad returned to Djurgården in 2016 as the team's strength and conditioning coach.

== Personal life ==
He is the grandson of the former professional footballer Lennart "Nacka" Skoglund.

== Career statistics ==
=== Regular season and playoffs ===
			Regular season					Playoffs
Season	Team	League	GP	G	A	Pts	PIM	GP	G	A	Pts	PIM
1998–99	Djurgårdens IF Hockey	SEL	44	2	4	6	18	4	0	0	0	8
1999–00	Djurgårdens IF Hockey	SEL	50	6	3	9	34	—	—	—	—	—
2000–01	Djurgårdens IF Hockey	SEL	50	7	8	15	79	16	7	2	9	14
2001–02	Tampa Bay Lightning	NHL	74	3	11	14	24	—	—	—	—	—
2002–03	Tampa Bay Lightning	NHL	37	0	3	3	16	—	—	—	—	—
2002–03	Springfield Falcons	AHL	6	0	1	1	13	—	—	—	—	—
2003–04	Hamilton Bulldogs	AHL	76	7	14	21	56	4	2	0	2	4
2004–05	Djurgårdens IF Hockey	SEL	46	4	8	12	89	12	0	1	1	47
2005–06	Djurgårdens IF Hockey	SEL	50	10	9	19	90	—	—	—	—	—
2006–07	Djurgårdens IF Hockey	SEL	54	9	13	22	104	—	—	—	—	—
2007–08	Djurgårdens IF Hockey	SEL	37	3	4	7	111	5	3	0	3	6
2008–09	Djurgårdens IF Hockey	SEL	41	1	9	10	101	—	—	—	—	—
2009–10	Djurgårdens IF Hockey	SEL	48	17	14	31	54	16	6	5	11	10
2010–11	Djurgårdens IF Hockey	SEL	34	7	5	12	20	3	0	0	0	2
2011–12	Djurgårdens IF Hockey	SEL	48	13	11	24	83	—	—	—	—	—
2012–13	Djurgårdens IF Hockey	Swe-2	45	8	6	14	71	—	—	—	—	—
NHL totals			111	3	14	17	40	—	—	—	—	—
