= Fredrik Bremberg =

Swedish ice hockey player (born 1973)

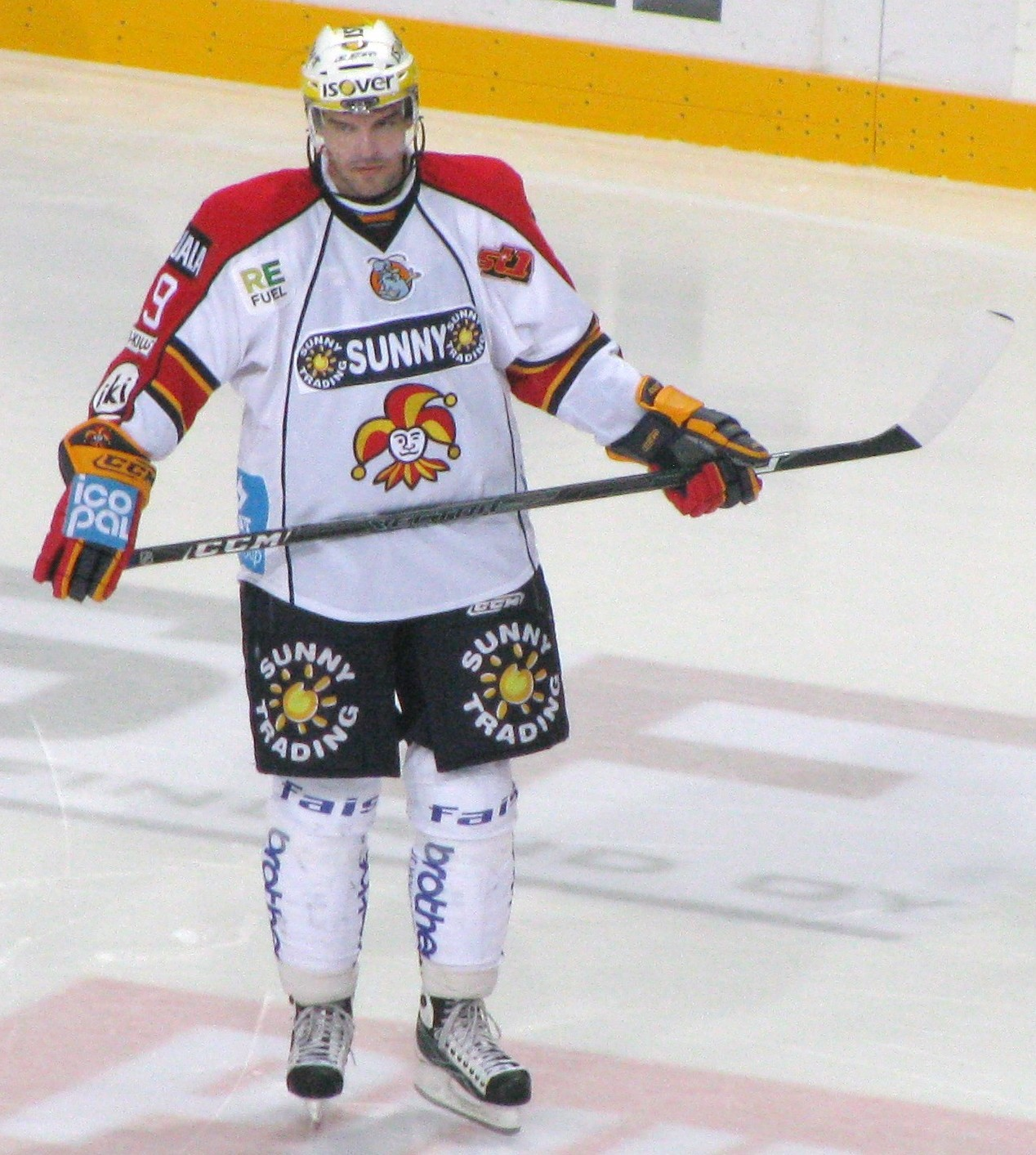
- Fredrik Bremberg playing for Jokerit against HIFK in December 2009
- Born: 21 June 1973 (age 53) Södertälje, Sweden
- Height: 6 ft 0 in (183 cm)
- Weight: 202 lb (92 kg; 14 st 6 lb)
- Position: Right wing
- Shot: Left
- Played for: Djurgårdens IF; Edmonton Oilers; HC Davos; MIF Redhawks; Jokerit; HV71; Timrå IK
- NHL draft: 55th overall, 1991; New Jersey Devils
- Playing career: 1989–2014

Per Fredrik Bremberg (born Per Fredrik Lindquist on 21 June 1973) is a Swedish former professional ice hockey player. He was drafted in the third round, 55th overall, by the New Jersey Devils in the 1991 NHL entry draft. He played eight games in the National Hockey League (NHL) with the Edmonton Oilers in the 1998–99 season.

Bremberg is the all-time leader in regular season points scored in Elitserien. He took the record from Jörgen Jönsson on 29 January 2009 — just ten days after Jönsson set it himself.

== Career statistics ==
=== Regular season and playoffs ===
			Regular season					Playoffs
Season	Team	League	GP	G	A	Pts	PIM	GP	G	A	Pts	PIM
1989–90	Huddinge IK	SWE.2	2	0	0	0	0	—	—	—	—	—
1990–91	Djurgårdens IF	SEL	28	6	4	10	0	7	1	0	1	2
1990–91	Nacka HK	SWE.3	7	1	4	5	8	—	—	—	—	—
1991–92	Djurgårdens IF	SEL	39	9	6	15	14	10	1	1	2	2
1992–93	Djurgårdens IF	SEL	39	9	11	20	8	4	1	2	3	2
1993–94	Djurgårdens IF	SEL	25	5	8	13	8	6	2	1	3	2
1994–95	Djurgårdens IF	SEL	40	11	16	27	14	3	0	0	0	2
1995–96	Djurgårdens IF	SEL	33	12	19	31	16	1	0	0	0	0
1996–97	Djurgårdens IF	SEL	44	19	28	47	16	4	0	3	3	2
1997–98	Djurgårdens IF	SEL	42	10	32	42	30	13	3	6	9	4
1998–99	Edmonton Oilers	NHL	8	0	0	0	2	0	0	0	0	0
1998–99	Hamilton Bulldogs	AHL	57	18	36	54	20	11	2	2	4	2
1999–2000	HC Davos	NLA	44	14	27	41	20	5	2	3	5	4
2000–01	MIF Redhawks	SEL	42	10	12	22	10	9	4	3	7	2
2001–02	MIF Redhawks	SEL	48	5	17	22	2	5	0	2	2	6
2002–03	Djurgårdens IF	SEL	45	18	20	38	24	12	4	1	5	4
2003–04	Djurgårdens IF	SEL	32	10	19	29	10	4	2	1	3	0
2004–05	Djurgårdens IF	SEL	37	5	9	14	18	8	2	0	2	0
2005–06	Djurgårdens IF	SEL	49	14	35	49	6	—	—	—	—	—
2006–07	Djurgårdens IF	SEL	53	23	41	64	20	—	—	—	—	—
2007–08	Djurgårdens IF	SEL	52	11	34	45	22	5	2	0	2	2
2008–09	Djurgårdens IF	SEL	53	17	40	57	26	—	—	—	—	—
2009–10	Jokerit	SM-liiga	45	13	26	39	6	3	5	2	7	2
2010–11	HV71	SEL	45	9	16	25	14	4	0	0	0	0
2011–12	HV71	SEL	4	0	1	1	0	—	—	—	—	—
2011–12	Timrå IK	SEL	23	3	7	10	2	—	—	—	—	—
2012–13	Djurgårdens IF	SWE.2	28	4	13	17	6	4	0	0	0	0
2013–14	Haninge Anchors HC	SWE.4	17	9	20	29	10	4	2	1	3	0
SEL totals			773	206	375	581	262	95	22	20	42	30

=== International ===
Year	Team	Event	GP	G	A	Pts	PIM
1991	Sweden	EJC	3	2	0	2
1993	Sweden	WJC	7	5	3	8	2
2000	Sweden	WC	6	1	1	2	0
2007	Sweden	WC	8	2	4	6	8
Junior totals			10	7	3	10	2
Senior totals			14	3	5	8	8
