= Pavel Vorobyev =

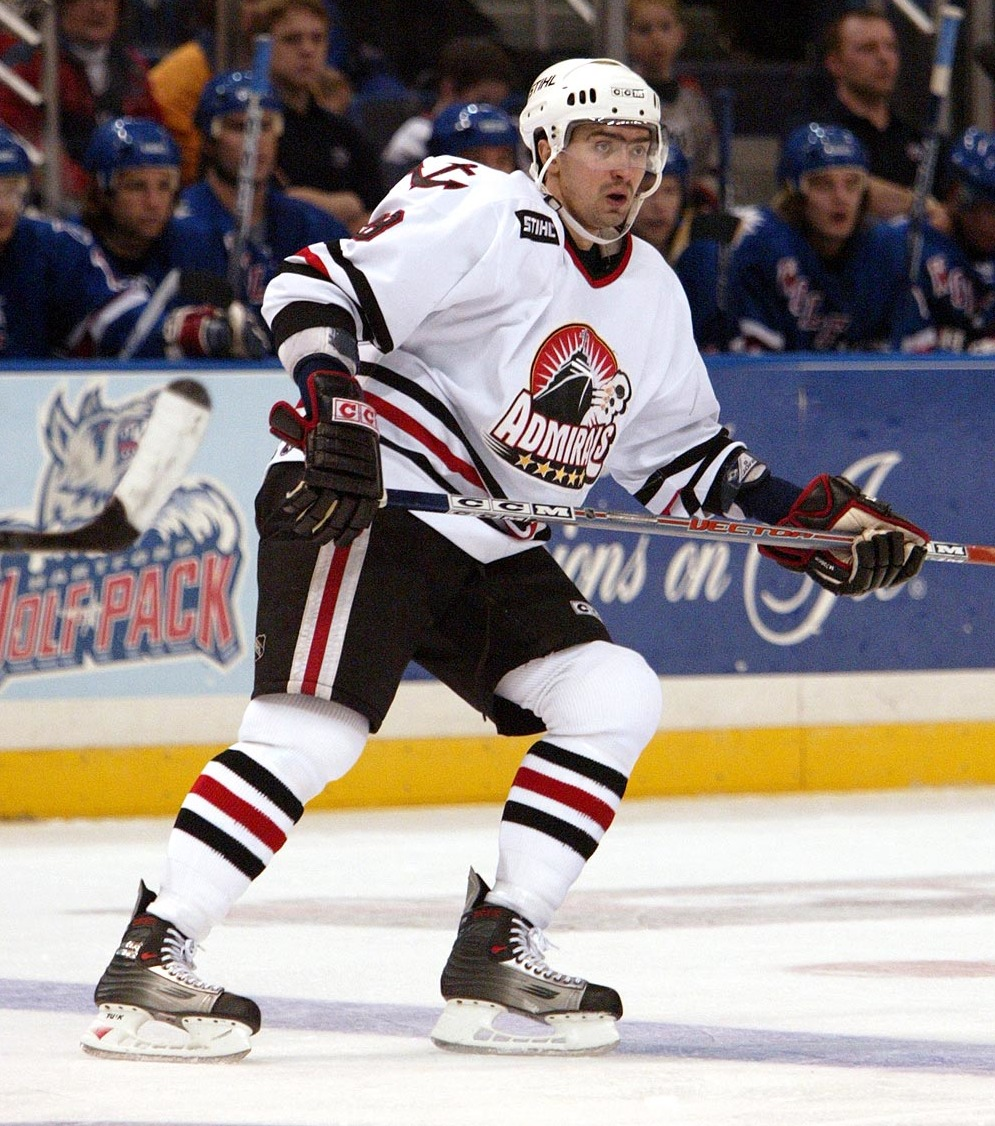
- Vorobyev with the Norfolk Admirals in 2005
- Born: May 5, 1982 (age 44) Karaganda, Kazakh SSR, Soviet Union
- Height: 6 ft 1 in (185 cm)
- Weight: 194 lb (88 kg; 13 st 12 lb)
- Position: Right wing
- Shot: Left
- Played for: Chicago Blackhawks; Khimik Moscow Oblast; HC Spartak Moscow; Severstal Cherepovets; Lokomotiv Yaroslavl; MVD Balashikha; HC Yugra; Edinburgh Capitals; KS Cracovia; Gyergyói HK; Dnipro Kherson
- NHL draft: 11th overall, 2000; Chicago Blackhawks
- Playing career: 1999–2021

Pavel Sergeyevich Vorobyev (Russian: Павел Сергеевич Воробьёв; born May 5, 1982) is a Russian former professional ice hockey right winger who last played for Ukrainian Hockey League side Dnipro Kherson. Vorobyev previously iced with Gyergyói HK in the Erste Liga, and played with the Edinburgh Capitals of the EIHL between 2016 and 2018.

== Playing career ==
Vorobyev was drafted in the 1st round, 11th overall, by the Chicago Blackhawks in the 2000 NHL entry draft. After playing for the Blackhawks for two seasons, Vorobyev announced in August, 2006, that he would not be returning to the team, but would instead play in Russia. Vorobyev accused Americans, but especially the Blackhawks organization, of being biased against Russians. The Blackhawks had the NHL rights to Vorobyev until the end of the 2008–09 season. Vorobyev has not ruled out playing in the NHL again, and said he hopes the Blackhawks trade his NHL rights.

== Career statistics ==
=== Regular season and playoffs ===
			Regular season					Playoffs
Season	Team	League	GP	G	A	Pts	PIM	GP	G	A	Pts	PIM
1998–99	Torpedo–2 Yaroslavl	RUS.3	17	0	1	1	0	—	—	—	—	—
1999–2000	Torpedo Yaroslavl	RSL	7	2	0	2	4	10	2	2	4	0
1999–2000	Torpedo–2 Yaroslavl	RUS.3	40	19	15	34	20	—	—	—	—	—
2000–01	Lokomotiv Yaroslavl	RSL	36	8	8	16	28	10	4	1	5	8
2001–02	Lokomotiv Yaroslavl	RSL	9	3	2	5	6	8	0	0	0	4
2002–03	Lokomotiv Yaroslavl	RSL	44	10	18	28	10	7	0	1	1	2
2002–03	Lokomotiv–2 Yaroslavl	RUS.3	4	2	4	6	2	—	—	—	—	—
2003–04	Chicago Blackhawks	NHL	18	1	3	4	4	—	—	—	—	—
2003–04	Norfolk Admirals	AHL	57	13	16	29	8	4	0	0	0	0
2004–05	Norfolk Admirals	AHL	79	19	25	44	48	6	2	1	3	4
2005–06	Chicago Blackhawks	NHL	39	9	12	21	34	—	—	—	—	—
2005–06	Norfolk Admirals	AHL	32	9	16	25	23	4	1	2	3	0
2006–07	Khimik Moscow Oblast	RSL	41	8	11	19	24	9	0	2	2	4
2006–07	Khimik–2 Moscow Oblast	RUS.2	7	9	5	14	8	—	—	—	—	—
2007–08	Spartak Moscow	RSL	56	13	14	27	18	5	0	2	2	6
2008–09	Severstal Cherepovets	KHL	46	6	10	16	41	—	—	—	—	—
2009–10	HC MVD	KHL	46	6	11	17	24	4	0	1	1	2
2010–11	Yugra Khanty-Mansiysk	KHL	47	9	10	19	12	5	0	1	1	2
2011–12	Yugra Khanty-Mansiysk	KHL	44	4	9	13	12	1	0	0	0	0
2012–13	Neftekhimik Nizhnekamsk	KHL	13	1	2	3	4	—	—	—	—	—
2012–13	Avtomobilist Yekaterinburg	KHL	3	0	0	0	0	—	—	—	—	—
2013–14	Vityaz Podolsk	KHL	7	0	0	0	4	—	—	—	—	—
2013–14	HC Ryazan	VHL	19	9	13	22	9	—	—	—	—	—
2014–15	HC Ryazan	VHL	51	10	23	33	30	5	1	1	2	4
2015–16	Saryarka Karagandy	VHL	8	0	4	4	16	—	—	—	—	—
2015–16	HC Ryazan	VHL	16	2	1	3	6	7	1	2	3	2
2016–17	Edinburgh Capitals	GBR	50	16	34	50	24	—	—	—	—	—
2017–18	Edinburgh Capitals	GBR	36	13	19	32	16	—	—	—	—	—
2017–18	Cracovia Kraków	POL	—	—	—	—	—	13	4	10	14	2
2018–19	CS Progym Gheorgheni	EL	54	26	28	54	0	—	—	—	—	—
2018–19	CS Progym Gheorgheni	ROU	22	13	26	39	4	6	3	7	10	0
2019–20	CS Progym Gheorgheni	EL	42	13	21	34		—	—	—	—	—
2019–20	CS Progym Gheorgheni	ROU	10	9	8	17	4	—	—	—	—	—
2020–21	Dnipro Kherson	UKR	30	8	17	25	10	—	—	—	—	—
RSL totals			193	44	53	97	90	49	6	8	14	24
NHL totals			57	10	15	25	38	—	—	—	—	—
KHL totals			206	26	42	68	97	10	0	2	2	4

=== International ===
Year	Team	Event	Result	GP	G	A	Pts	PIM
2000	Russia	WJC18	2nd place, silver medalist(s)	6	2	6	8	10
2001	Russia	WJC	7th	7	2	3	5	6
Junior totals				13	4	9	13	16

Preceded by Mikhail Yakubov	Chicago Blackhawks first-round draft pick 2000	Succeeded by Tuomo Ruutu
