= Kenny Jönsson =

Swedish ice hockey player (born 1974)

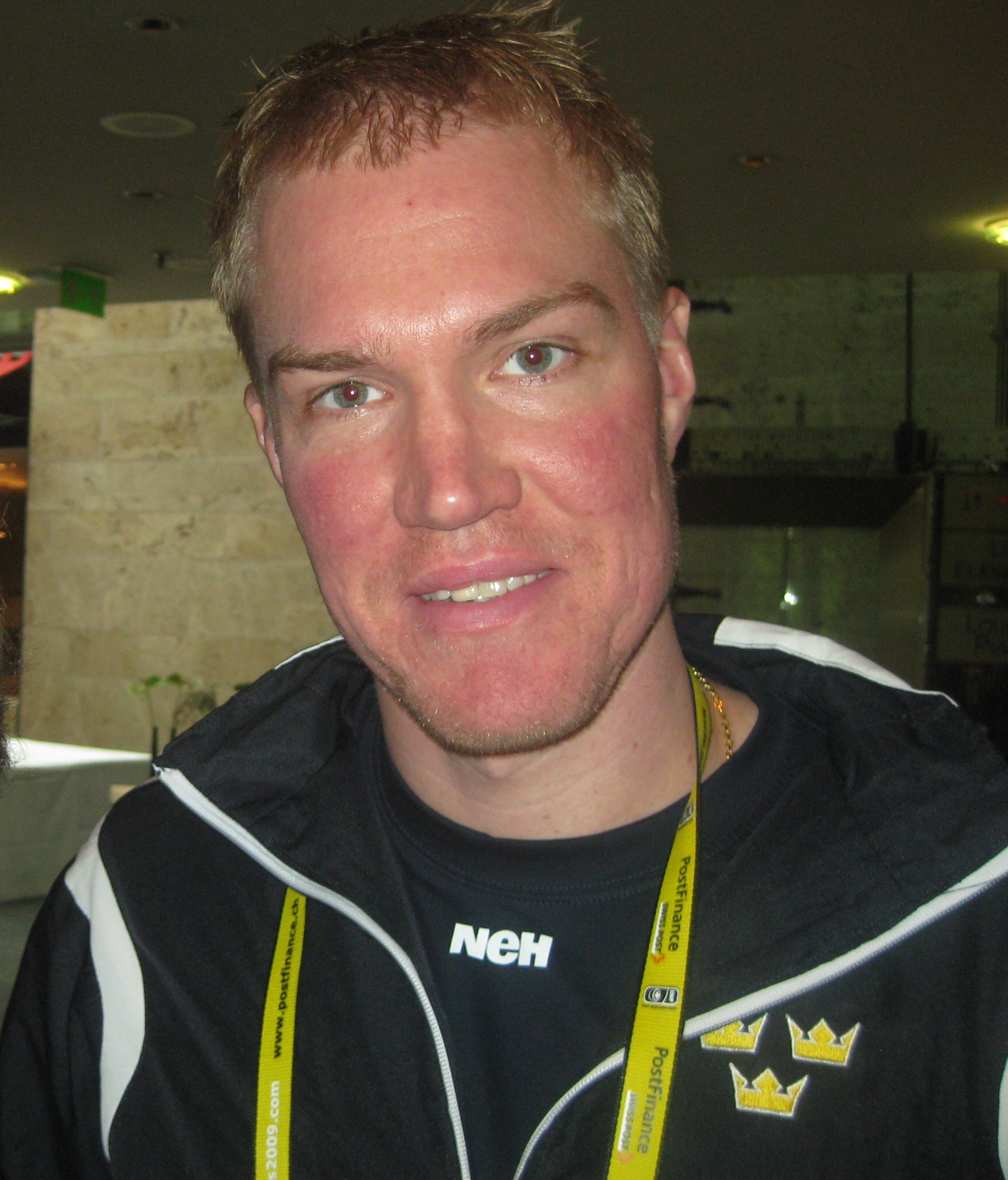
- Jönsson in 2009
- Born: 6 October 1974 (age 52) Ängelholm, Sweden
- Height: 6 ft 3 in (191 cm)
- Weight: 217 lb (98 kg; 15 st 7 lb)
- Position: Defence
- Shot: Left
- Played for: Rögle BK; Toronto Maple Leafs; New York Islanders
- National team: Sweden
- NHL draft: 12th overall, 1993; Toronto Maple Leafs
- Playing career: 1991–2009
Medal record
Men's ice hockey
Gold medal – first place	1994 Lillehammer	Ice hockey
Gold medal – first place	2006 Turin	Ice hockey

Kenny Per Anders Jönsson (born 6 October 1974) is a Swedish former professional ice hockey player. He played in the National Hockey League for the Toronto Maple Leafs and New York Islanders, and for Rögle BK in the Swedish Hockey League. Internationally, he played for the Sweden men's national ice hockey team and was inducted into the IIHF Hall of Fame.

== Playing career ==
Jönsson was drafted by the Toronto Maple Leafs in the 1st round as the 12th overall selection in the 1993 NHL entry draft. After playing with the Toronto club during the 1994–95 lockout shortened season, he was traded midway through the 1995–96 season to the New York Islanders in a player exchange which brought highly popular former captain Wendel Clark back to Toronto. Jönsson then spent the remainder of his NHL career with the Islanders. After playing with the Swedish second division team Rögle BK, where he started his career, during the 2004–05 NHL lockout, he announced in the summer of 2005 that he was staying with the club for the 2005–06 season.

Jönsson played with the Islanders from 1996 through 2004. Fans and journalists considered Jönsson one of the most underrated defensemen in the league during his time in the NHL. He played good positional defense and had sound offensive skills as well, but his quiet demeanor and low-key playing style kept him below the radar of some observers. During the 1999–2000 NHL season, Jönsson was named captain of the Islanders. After a season and a half, he stepped down and ultimately was succeeded by Michael Peca.

He was voted Best Defender of the Tournament at the 2006 Winter Olympics where Sweden won the gold medal. This was quite surprising considering he had spent a season in the Swedish second division, while most of the other players played in the NHL.

His brother Jörgen is also a well-known Swedish ice hockey player; the two were briefly teammates in the 1999-2000 NHL season.

During IHWC 2006 World Championship, with brother Jörgen initially sidelined by injury, he was named captain of the Swedish national team.

== Coaching career ==
Prior to the 2010–11 season, Jönsson signed as an assistant coach of Rögle BK. However, after the end of the season, it was announced that he would leave Rögle as an assistant coach. Jönsson is currently assistant coach for Helsingborgs Hockey Club, educating the defense players.

== Awards ==
- Elitserien Rookie of the Year in 1993.
- Elitserien Junior of the Year in 1994.
- Junior World Championship's Best Defenceman in 1994.
- Named to the Junior World Championship All-Star Team in 1993 and 1994.
- Gold medal at the Winter Olympics in 1994 and 2006.
- Bronze medal at the World Championships in 1994 and 2009.
- Named to the NHL All-Rookie Team in 1995.
- Bronze medal at the World Cup of Hockey in 1996.
- Played in the NHL All-Star Game in 1999.
- Silver medal at the World Championship in 2004.
- Awarded Elitserien Guldpucken (Swedish Player of the Year) in 2006.
- Winter Olympic's Best Defenceman in 2006.
- Gold medal at the World Championship in 2006.
- Named to the World Championship All-Star Team in 2009.
- Member of New York Islanders Hall of Fame.
- Inducted into the player category of the IIHF Hall of Fame during the medal ceremony of the 2024 IIHF World Championship.

== Career statistics ==
=== Regular season and playoffs ===
			Regular season					Playoffs
Season	Team	League	GP	G	A	Pts	PIM	GP	G	A	Pts	PIM
1991–92	Rögle BK	SWE II	30	4	11	15	24	5	0	0	0	0
1992–93	Rögle BK	J20	2	1	2	3	25	—	—	—	—	—
1992–93	Rögle BK	SEL	39	3	10	13	42	—	—	—	—	—
1993–94	Rögle BK	SEL	36	4	13	17	40	3	1	1	2	2
1994–95	Rögle BK	SEL	8	3	1	4	20	—	—	—	—	—
1994–95	St. John's Maple Leafs	AHL	10	2	5	7	2	—	—	—	—	—
1994–95	Toronto Maple Leafs	NHL	39	2	7	9	16	4	0	0	0	0
1995–96	Toronto Maple Leafs	NHL	50	4	22	26	22	—	—	—	—	—
1995–96	New York Islanders	NHL	16	0	4	4	10	—	—	—	—	—
1996–97	New York Islanders	NHL	81	3	18	21	24	—	—	—	—	—
1997–98	New York Islanders	NHL	81	14	26	40	58	—	—	—	—	—
1998–99	New York Islanders	NHL	63	8	18	26	34	—	—	—	—	—
1999–2000	New York Islanders	NHL	65	1	24	25	32	—	—	—	—	—
2000–01	New York Islanders	NHL	65	8	21	29	30	—	—	—	—	—
2001–02	New York Islanders	NHL	76	10	22	32	26	5	1	2	3	4
2002–03	New York Islanders	NHL	71	8	18	26	24	5	0	1	1	0
2003–04	New York Islanders	NHL	79	5	24	29	22	5	0	0	0	2
2004–05	Rögle BK	SWE II	11	3	7	10	12	2	0	0	0	2
2005–06	Rögle BK	SWE II	29	6	12	18	55	—	—	—	—	—
2006–07	Rögle BK	SWE II	14	4	17	21	12	—	—	—	—	—
2007–08	Rögle BK	SWE II	34	12	28	40	26	—	—	—	—	—
2008–09	Rögle BK	SEL	47	6	24	30	26	—	—	—	—	—
SEL totals			130	16	48	64	128	3	1	1	2	2
NHL totals			686	63	204	267	298	19	1	3	4	6

=== International ===
Year	Team	Event	GP	G	A	Pts	PIM
1992	Sweden	EJC	6	1	2	3	10
1993	Sweden	WJC	7	2	3	5	14
1994	Sweden	WJC	7	3	5	8	8
1994	Sweden	OLY	3	1	0	1	0
1994	Sweden	WC	7	0	1	1	6
1996	Sweden	WC	6	0	1	1	8
1996	Sweden	WCH	1	0	0	0	4
2002	Sweden	OLY	3	1	0	1	2
2005	Sweden	WC	6	2	2	4	0
2006	Sweden	OLY	8	0	4	4	0
2006	Sweden	WC	9	3	3	6	6
2007	Sweden	WC	7	1	0	1	4
2008	Sweden	WC	5	2	4	6	2
2009	Sweden	WC	9	3	4	7	2
Junior totals			20	6	10	16	32
Senior totals			64	13	19	32	38

== See also ==
- Captain (ice hockey)
- Notable families in the NHL

Awards and achievements
Preceded by Grant Marshall	Toronto Maple Leafs first-round draft pick 1993	Succeeded by Landon Wilson
Preceded by Henrik Lundqvist	Golden Puck; 2006	Succeeded by Per Svartvadet
Sporting positions
Preceded by Trevor Linden	New York Islanders captain 1999–2000	Succeeded by Michael Peca
