= Johan Davidsson =

Swedish ice hockey player (born 1976)

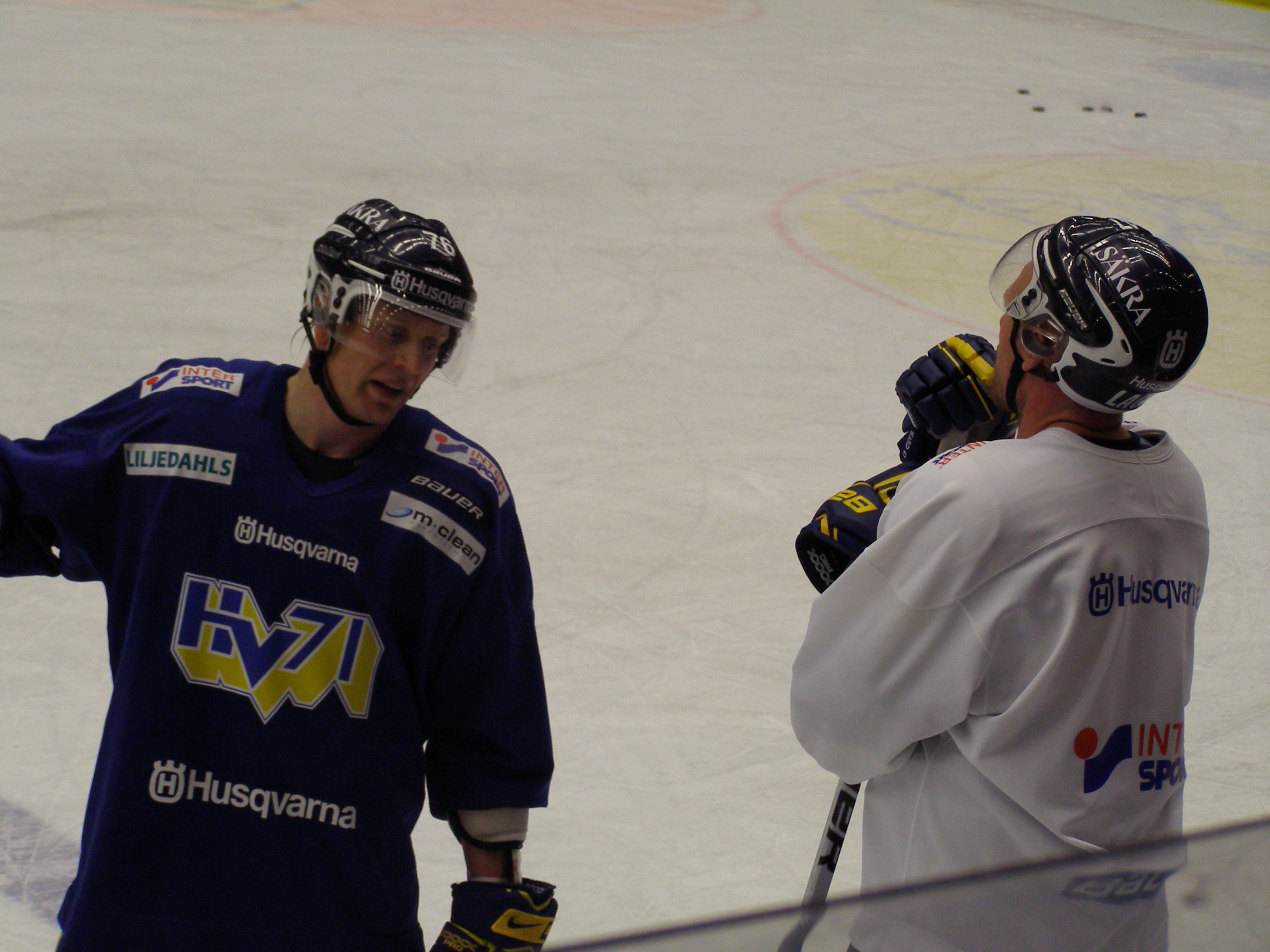
- Johan Davidsson (left) speaking with Lance Ward in February 2010
- Born: 6 January 1976 (age 50) Huskvarna, Sweden
- Height: 6 ft 0 in (183 cm)
- Weight: 192 lb (87 kg; 13 st 10 lb)
- Position: Centre
- Shot: Left
- Played for: HV71; Mighty Ducks of Anaheim; New York Islanders; HIFK; Espoo Blues
- National team: Sweden
- NHL draft: 28th overall, 1994; Mighty Ducks of Anaheim
- Playing career: 1992–2013

Johan Markus Davidsson (born 6 January 1976) is a Swedish former professional ice hockey player, who played last with HV71 in the Swedish Hockey League, SHL. He was a long-time Elitserien/SHL player and captain of HV71 for eleven seasons, with which he has won the Swedish championship four times.

== Playing career ==
Davidsson wore jersey number 76 and was the captain of HV71. In 2005 Davidsson renewed his contract with HV71 until the end of season 2009–10. He is regarded as an able skater with a good eye for the game and is as good as a playmaker as a scorer. He has got fine puck control but lacks the physical aspects of the game to fit in NHL. He has been awarded the Swedish hockey journalists association prize Rinkens riddare (Knight of the Rink) for three consecutive seasons, 2002–03, 2003–04 and 2004–05, and the Elitserien's referee association prize Årets gentleman (Gentleman of the Year, which resembles Lady Byng Memorial Trophy of the NHL) for two consecutive seasons, 2002–03 and 2003–04. In 2009, he was awarded Guldhjälmen (Golden Helmet, resembling the Lester Pearson Award) as Elitserien's most valuable player.

Davidsson played his first Swedish Elite League game on 14 January 1993, scoring a goal when HV71 defeated Djurgårdens IF, 4–3, in the Stockholm Globe Arena. His first appearance for Sweden's national team was on 7 November 1996, in a game in Helsinki, Finland, when Sweden defeated the Czech Republic, 3–1, during the Karjala Tournament. Davidsson was drafted in the 1994 NHL entry draft by Anaheim Ducks with their second choice, the 28th overall selection.

In the 2007 World Championships, Davidsson won the point scoring league with 14 points, just one point past Russia's Alexei Morozov. The 2007 tournament was Davidsson's best World Championships personally, having only scored three points in his previous two tournaments.

During the end of 2009 and beginning of 2010, Davidsson received contract proposals from the Kontinental Hockey League and Swiss National League A but choose to stay in Sweden, signing a five-year deal with his most recent club HV71.

== Off the ice ==
Davidsson figured in Swedish news when he dated the Finnish violinist Linda Lampenius in 2003. During the 2006 World Championships he appeared as colour commentator on TV3 Sweden.

== International play ==
Davidsson played a total of 129 games for Sweden. His last game for Sweden was played in 2009. After declining an offer by coach Pär Mårts to play in the 2011 Karjala Tournament, Davidsson officially retired from international play on 26 October 2011.

== Awards ==
- TV-pucken champion with Småland in 1990 and 1991.
- European Junior Championship's Best Forward in 1994.
- Named to the European Junior Championship All-Star Team in 1994.
- Swedish Champion with HV71 in 1995, 2004, 2008 and 2010.
- World Junior Championship's Best Player of Team Sweden in 1996.
- Finnish Champion with HIFK in 1998.
- Played in Elitserien All-Star Game in 2002.
- Bronze medal at the Ice Hockey World Championship in 2002.
- Silver medal at the Ice Hockey World Championship in 2003 and 2004.
- Awarded Årets gentleman (Elitserien Gentleman of the Year) in 2003 and 2004.
- Awarded Rinkens riddare (Elitserien Knight of the Rink) in 2003, 2004 and 2005.
- Named to the Swedish All-Star Team in 2003, 2004 and 2008.
- Awarded Guldpucken in 2004.
- Top scorer at the Ice Hockey World Championship in 2007.
- Awarded Guldhjälmen in 2009.
- Elitserien playoff silver medal with HV71 in 2009.

== Records ==
- Elitserien 2003–04 playoff record for points (17)

== Career statistics ==
=== Regular season and playoffs ===
			Regular season					Playoffs
Season	Team	League	GP	G	A	Pts	PIM	GP	G	A	Pts	PIM
1992–93	HV71	SEL	8	1	0	1	0	—	—	—	—	—
1993–94	HV71	SWE.2 U20	5	2	3	5	0	—	—	—	—	—
1993–94	HV71	SEL	38	2	5	7	4	—	—	—	—	—
1994–95	HV71	J20	3	4	1	5	0	—	—	—	—	—
1994–95	HV71	SEL	38	4	7	11	20	13	3	2	5	0
1995–96	HV71	SEL	40	7	11	18	20	4	0	2	2	0
1996–97	HV71	SEL	50	18	21	39	18	5	0	3	3	2
1997–98	HIFK	SM-l	43	10	30	40	8	9	3	10	13	0
1998–99	Mighty Ducks of Anaheim	NHL	64	3	5	8	14	1	0	0	0	0
1998–99	Cincinnati Mighty Ducks	AHL	9	1	6	7	2	—	—	—	—	—
1999–2000	Mighty Ducks of Anaheim	NHL	5	1	0	1	2	—	—	—	—	—
1999–2000	Cincinnati Mighty Ducks	AHL	55	9	31	40	24	—	—	—	—	—
1999–2000	New York Islanders	NHL	13	2	4	6	0	—	—	—	—	—
2000–01	Espoo Blues	SM-l	35	12	17	29	34	—	—	—	—	—
2001–02	HV71	SEL	50	13	27	40	24	8	2	3	5	2
2002–03	HV71	SEL	50	16	26	42	4	7	0	3	3	2
2003–04	HV71	SEL	49	14	24	38	8	19	5	12	17	6
2004–05	HV71	SEL	50	12	26	38	2	—	—	—	—	—
2005–06	HV71	SEL	50	14	22	36	16	12	1	7	8	4
2006–07	HV71	SEL	55	15	31	46	22	14	2	7	9	2
2007–08	HV71	SEL	47	9	34	43	18	17	8	12	20	2
2008–09	HV71	SEL	55	13	37	50	24	14	3	7	10	2
2009–10	HV71	SEL	55	12	46	58	18	16	4	11	15	6
2010–11	HV71	SEL	40	10	26	36	35	4	1	1	2	2
2011–12	HV71	SEL	52	10	30	40	18	6	1	1	2	4
2012–13	HV71	SEL	51	5	13	18	14	5	0	3	3	0
SEL totals			776	175	386	561	273	144	30	75	105	34
SM-l totals			78	22	47	69	42	9	3	10	13	0
NHL totals			82	6	9	15	16	1	0	0	0	0

Medal record

Representing Sweden

Ice hockey

World Championships
Silver medal – second place	2003 Finland	
Silver medal – second place	2004 Czech Republic	
Bronze medal – third place	2002 Sweden	

World Junior Championships
Silver medal – second place	1994 Czech Republic	
Silver medal – second place	1996 United States	
Bronze medal – third place	1995 Canada	

European Junior Championship
Silver medal – second place	1993 Poland	
Silver medal – second place	1994 Finland	

=== International ===
Year	Team	Event	GP	G	A	Pts	PIM
1993	Sweden	EJC	6	1	3	4	4
1994	Sweden	EJC	5	5	7	12	0
1994	Sweden	WJC	6	1	4	5	6
1995	Sweden	WJC	7	4	2	6	2
1996	Sweden	WJC	7	3	6	9	4
2002	Sweden	WC	7	1	1	2	2
2003	Sweden	WC	9	0	1	1	4
2004	Sweden	WC	7	0	0	0	0
2007	Sweden	WC	9	7	7	14	2
Junior totals			31	14	22	36	16
Senior totals			32	8	9	17	8

Statistics as of 13 May 2007.

Preceded by Niklas Andersson	Golden Puck; 2004	Succeeded by Henrik Lundqvist
Preceded by Tony Mårtensson	Guldhjälmen; 2009	Succeeded by Undecided
