= Jan Platil =

- Born: February 9, 1983 (age 43) Kladno, CZE
- Height: 6 ft 2 in (188 cm)
- Weight: 207 lb (94 kg; 14 st 11 lb)
- Position: Defence
- Caught: Left
- Played for: HC Kladno (CZE); Binghamton Senators (AHL); Lukko Rauma (SML); HC CSKA Moscow (RSL); Amur Khabarovsk (RSL); Traktor Chelyabinsk (RSL); HK Aquacity ŠKP Poprad (SVK)
- NHL draft: 218th overall, 2001; Ottawa Senators
- Playing career: 2003–2016

Jan Platil (born February 9, 1983, in Kladno, Czechoslovakia) is a professional ice hockey player, who is currently contracted with Hull Pirates.

== Career ==
=== Draft ===
He was drafted in the seventh round, 218 th overall, by the Ottawa Senators in the 2001 NHL entry draft.

=== Club career ===
The defenceman has played for the HC Kladno, Barrie Colts, Binghamton Senators and Lukko. He has also played for HC CSKA Moscow and Amur Khabarovsk in the Russian Super League, Tappara in the SM-liiga. In 2016, Jan played in England as captain of the then-newly formed Hull Pirates who play in the English 2nd tier league EPIHL.

OHL Performers of the Month

December 2002 – Defenceman of the Month – Jan Platil, Barrie Colts

February 2003 – Defenceman of the Month – Jan Platil, Barrie Colts

March 2003 – Defenceman of the Month – Jan Platil, Barrie Colts

October 2003 – Defenceman of the Month – Jan Platil, Barrie Colts

December 2003 – Defenceman of the Month – Jan Platil, Barrie Colts

== Career statistics ==
=== Regular season and playoffs ===
			Regular season					Playoffs
Season	Team	League	GP	G	A	Pts	PIM	GP	G	A	Pts	PIM
1998–99	HC Velvana Kladno	CZE U18	46	8	12	20		—	—	—	—	—
1999–2000	HC Velvana Kladno	CZE U20	40	5	6	11	66	2	0	0	0	4
1999–2000	HC Velvana Kladno	ELH	9	0	0	0	2	—	—	—	—	—
1999–2000	HC Velvana Kladno	CZE U18	—	—	—	—	—	4	1	0	1	10
2000–01	Barrie Colts	OHL	60	6	18	24	114	5	0	0	0	12
2001–02	Barrie Colts	OHL	68	13	34	47	136	20	1	5	6	51
2002–03	Barrie Colts	OHL	61	15	36	51	163	6	1	5	6	8
2003–04	Binghamton Senators	AHL	66	1	3	4	142	—	—	—	—	—
2004–05	Binghamton Senators	AHL	72	1	3	4	198	6	0	1	1	4
2005–06	Binghamton Senators	AHL	65	5	14	19	212	—	—	—	—	—
2006–07	Lukko	SM-liiga	25	0	8	8	62	—	—	—	—	—
2006–07	CSKA Moscow	RSL	20	1	2	3	48	12	1	1	2	71
2007–08	Amur Khabarovsk	RSL	44	7	13	20	103	4	0	1	1	38
2008–09	Traktor Chelyabinsk	KHL	40	6	8	14	127	1	0	0	0	4
2009–10	Traktor Chelyabinsk	KHL	20	0	4	4	64	—	—	—	—	—
2009–10	HC Oceláři Třinec	ELH	17	0	0	0	48	5	0	1	1	35
2010–11	HC Vagnerplast Kladno	ELH	3	0	0	0	0	—	—	—	—	—
2010–11	HK Poprad	SVK	2	0	0	0	0	—	—	—	—	—
2010–11	Thomas Sabo Ice Tigers	DEL	19	0	0	0	60	—	—	—	—	—
2011–12	Orli Znojmo	AUT	10	1	2	3	52	—	—	—	—	—
2011–12	Tappara	SM-liiga	13	1	0	1	12	—	—	—	—	—
2011–12	Pelicans	SM-liiga	6	0	1	1	4	—	—	—	—	—
2012–13	SG Pontebba	ITA	8	0	4	4	12	—	—	—	—	—
2013–14	HKm Zvolen	SVK	10	1	1	2	12	—	—	—	—	—
2013–14	ČEZ Motor České Budějovice	CZE.2	14	0	1	1	28	—	—	—	—	—
2014–15	HC Rebel Havlíčkův Brod	CZE.2	12	0	5	5	84	—	—	—	—	—
2015–16	Hull Pirates	GBR.2	4	0	0	0	4	—	—	—	—	—
2015–16	Manchester Phoenix	GBR.2	5	0	2	2	6	—	—	—	—	—
2019–20	HT Mníšek pod Brdy	CZE.5	6	3	5	8	0	2	1	0	1	0
2020–21	HC Letci Letňany B	CZE.5	3	0	1	1	4	—	—	—	—	—
AHL totals			203	7	20	27	552	6	0	1	1	4
RSL totals			64	8	15	23	151	16	1	2	3	109
KHL totals			60	6	12	18	191	1	0	0	0	4

=== International ===
Year	Team	Event	GP	G	A	Pts	PIM
2001	Czech Republic	WJC18	7	0	0	0	20
2007	Czech Republic	WC	4	0	0	0	8
Senior totals			4	0	0	0	8
