= Jörgen Jönsson =

Swedish ice hockey player

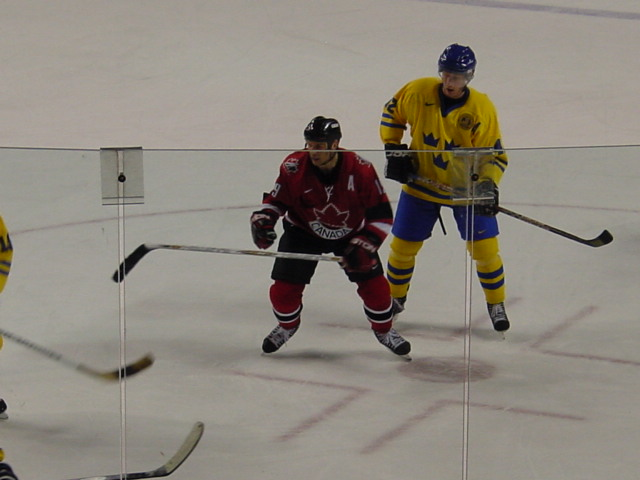
- Jönsson (right) with Team Sweden in 2002
- Born: 29 September 1972 (age 53) Ängelholm, Sweden
- Height: 183 cm (6 ft 0 in)
- Weight: 88 kg (194 lb; 13 st 12 lb)
- Position: Centre
- Shot: Left
- Played for: Rögle BK; New York Islanders; Mighty Ducks of Anaheim; Färjestads BK
- National team: Sweden
- NHL draft: 227th overall, 1994; Calgary Flames
- Playing career: 1990–2009

Medal record

Representing Sweden

Men's ice hockey

Winter Olympic
Gold medal – first place	1994 Lillehammer	
Gold medal – first place	2006 Turin	

World Championships
Gold medal – first place	1998 Switzerland	
Gold medal – first place	2006 Latvia	
Silver medal – second place	1997 Finland	
Silver medal – second place	2003 Finland	
Silver medal – second place	2004 Czech Republic	
Bronze medal – third place	1994 Italy	
Bronze medal – third place	1999 Norway	
Bronze medal – third place	2001 Germany	
Bronze medal – third place	2002 Sweden	

Ulf Peter Jörgen Jönsson (born 29 September 1972) is a Swedish former professional ice hockey player who last played for Färjestads BK of the Swedish Elitserien. He has represented the Team Sweden 285 times, making him the record holder for most games played in the national team. Jörgen Jönsson is also the older brother of former NHL-star Kenny Jönsson, and the two played 68 games in North America together as teammates. Jönsson was inducted into the IIHF Hall of Fame in 2019.

== Playing career ==
Jönsson started his professional career in Rögle BK and also played one season in the NHL (for the New York Islanders and Mighty Ducks of Anaheim), highlighted by being named NHL player of the week on February 14, 2000. He chose to move home after one season because he wanted to be with his family. Jönsson is a highly respected player in the Swedish national team. During his career, he was the captain of Team Sweden, unless Mats Sundin was available. On 11 February 2007, he played in his 273rd game for the national team, breaking the record held by Jonas Bergqvist, eventually playing in 285 games for the national team.

Jönsson won Guldpucken (Sweden's player of the year) in 1997.

As of the World Championship 2006 he is the only player in history who has won Olympic gold, World Championship gold and the domestic (Elitserien) playoffs during one season.

On 9 April 2009, he retired from professional hockey. Färjestads BK, for whom Jönsson played 13 seasons, has retired no. 21 in his honor.

Prior to the 2009–10 season, Jönsson was named an assistant general manager of Färjestad. Prior to that season's playoffs, he was named an assistant coach of Färjestad. In the 2010–11 season Jönsson continued to work for Färjestad as an assistant coach. After the 2010–11 season, however, it was announced that he had decided to leave Färjestad as an assistant coach.

== International ==
He has earned his two Olympic gold medals, two World Championship gold medals and five national gold medals and is one of Sweden's best known hockey players.

Jönsson was inducted into the IIHF Hall of Fame in 2019.

== Personal life ==
His brother Kenny Jönsson is also a well-known Swedish ice hockey player who spent 11 seasons in the NHL, playing for the Toronto Maple Leafs and the New York Islanders.

== Career statistics ==
=== Regular season and playoffs ===
			Regular season					Playoffs
Season	Team	League	GP	G	A	Pts	PIM	GP	G	A	Pts	PIM
1989–90	Rögle BK	SWE.2	1	0	0	0	0	4	0	0	0	0
1990–91	Rögle BK	SWE.2	21	4	2	6	2	12	2	1	3	2
1991–92	Rögle BK	SWE.2	27	1	8	9	6	5	0	0	0	0
1992–93	Rögle BK	SEL	40	17	11	28	28	—	—	—	—	—
1993–94	Rögle BK	SEL	40	17	14	31	46	3	1	0	1	2
1994–95	Rögle BK	SEL	22	4	6	10	18	—	—	—	—	—
1995–96	Färjestads BK	SEL	39	11	15	26	36	8	0	4	4	6
1996–97	Färjestads BK	SEL	49	12	21	33	58	14	9	5	14	14
1997–98	Färjestads BK	SEL	45	22	25	47	53	12	2	9	11	12
1998–99	Färjestads BK	SEL	48	17	24	41	44	4	0	2	2	4
1999–2000	New York Islanders	NHL	68	11	17	28	16	—	—	—	—	—
1999–2000	Mighty Ducks of Anaheim	NHL	13	1	2	3	0	—	—	—	—	—
2000–01	Färjestads BK	SEL	50	20	26	46	32	15	5	12	17	12
2001–02	Färjestads BK	SEL	50	22	17	39	20	10	5	1	6	16
2002–03	Färjestads BK	SEL	49	16	23	39	58	14	0	4	4	2
2003–04	Färjestads BK	SEL	49	16	21	37	24	17	6	6	12	16
2004–05	Färjestads BK	SEL	50	11	21	32	38	15	4	4	8	6
2005–06	Färjestads BK	SEL	48	17	16	33	60	18	9	9	18	6
2006–07	Färjestads BK	SEL	48	15	32	47	44	9	0	6	6	4
2007–08	Färjestads BK	SEL	42	6	20	26	24	12	5	5	10	12
2008–09	Färjestads BK	SEL	42	8	12	20	32	12	3	7	10	12
SEL totals			711	231	304	535	615	160	48	74	122	122
NHL totals			81	12	19	31	16	—	—	—	—	—

=== International ===
Year	Team	Event	GP	G	A	Pts	PIM
1994	Sweden	OLY	6	0	0	0	0
1994	Sweden	WC	7	3	2	5	4
1997	Sweden	WC	11	5	2	7	6
1998	Sweden	OLY	1	0	0	0	0
1998	Sweden	WC	10	2	1	3	8
1999	Sweden	WC	10	3	1	4	10
2000	Sweden	WC	6	0	2	2	2
2001	Sweden	WC	9	2	3	5	0
2002	Sweden	OLY	4	0	0	0	4
2002	Sweden	WC	9	1	3	4	6
2003	Sweden	WC	9	4	2	6	14
2004	Sweden	WC	9	1	3	4	2
2004	Sweden	WCH	4	0	0	0	0
2005	Sweden	WC	9	2	3	5	2
2006	Sweden	OLY	8	1	1	2	4
2006	Sweden	WC	6	3	1	4	0
2007	Sweden	WC	9	0	8	8	6
Senior totals			127	27	32	59	68

== Head coaching record ==
=== SHL ===
Team	Year	Regular season							Playoffs			
Team	Year	G	W	OTW	OTL	L	Pts	Finish	W	L	Win%	Result
VLH	2022–23	52	27	7	7	11	102	1st in SHL	12	6	.667	Won Final (SKE)
VLH	2023–24	52	29	4	4	15	99	2nd in SHL	4	4	.500	Lost in Semi-finals (RBK)
VLH	2024–25	52	17	9	7	19	76	8th in SHL	3	5	.375	Lost in Quarter-finals (LHF)
FBK	2025–26	–	–	–	–	–	–	TBD	–	–	–	TBD
NHL total		156	73	20	18	45			19	15	.559	3 playoff appearances 1 SHL playoff winners

== See also ==
- Notable families in the NHL

Preceded by Jonas Bergqvist	Golden Puck; 1997	Succeeded by Ulf Dahlén
