= Jaroslav Bednář =

Czech ice hockey player (born 1976)

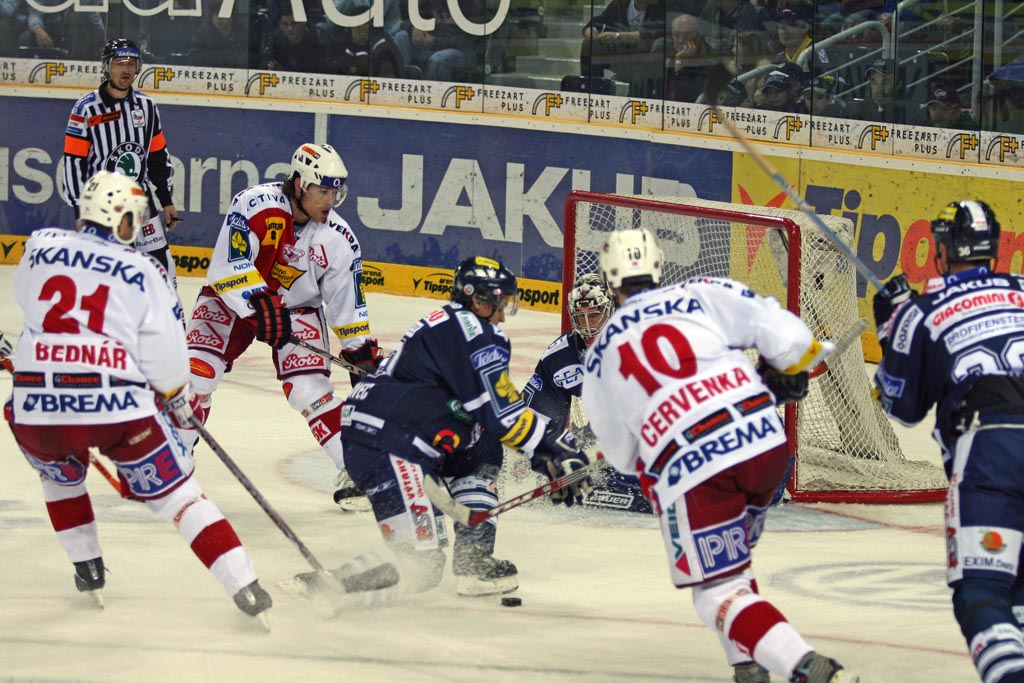
- Jaroslav Bednář at match between Bílí Tygři Liberec and HC Slavia Praha, October 2007
- Born: November 9, 1976 (age 49) Prague, Czechoslovakia
- Height: 5 ft 10 in (178 cm)
- Weight: 176 lb (80 kg; 12 st 8 lb)
- Position: Right wing
- Shot: Right
- Played for: HC Slavia Praha; HC Sparta Praha; HC Plzeň; JYP; HIFK; Los Angeles Kings; Florida Panthers; Avangard Omsk; Torpedo Nizhny Novgorod; HC Davos; HC Lugano; SC Bern; HK Hradec Kralove; HC Vrchlabí
- National team: Czech Republic
- NHL draft: 51st overall, 2001; Los Angeles Kings
- Playing career: 1994–2021

Jaroslav Bednář (born 9 November 1976) is a Czech former professional ice hockey winger.

== Playing career ==
Born in Prague, Czechoslovakia, Bednář began his career with Slavia Prague in 1994 and stayed there for three years before moving to rivals Sparta Prague. He played just 14 games before moving to Plzeň and then returned to play for Sparta for the next season. He then spent the next two seasons playing in Finland's SM-liiga with spells at JYP and HIFK where he led the teams in goals and points.

=== NHL ===
Bednář was drafted 51st overall by the Los Angeles Kings in the 2001 NHL entry draft, but never managed to recapture the form he had in Finland. He played 37 games for the Kings, scoring 4 goals and 11 assists for 15 points. On November 26, 2002, Bednář, along with Andreas Lilja was traded to the Florida Panthers for Dmitri Yushkevich, he played 65 games for Florida, scoring 6 goals and 14 assists for 20 points. Overall, Bednář played 102 regular season games, scoring 10 goals and 25 assists for 35 points.

=== Return to Europe ===
Bednář moved to Russia during the cancelled 2004–05 NHL season and played for Avangard Omsk where he played alongside Jaromír Jágr, Alexander Perezhogin and Oleg Tverdovsky. In 2005, Bednář returned to Slavia Prague where he has become one of their core players and left the team after four years on 29 April 2009 to sign with Atlant Moscow of the Kontinental Hockey League. In 2010, Bednář signed a one-year contract with HC Davos from the Swiss NLA where he played alongside 3 other Czech players: Petr Sýkora, Petr Tatíček and Josef Marha. During the 2010–11 regular season, Bednář scored 35 goals and 15 assists for a total of 50 points in 43 games. On May 21, 2013, Bednar returned again to his original club, HC Slavia Praha, for a fourth stint. He would play three seasons with HK Hradec Králové through to 2018.

== Career statistics ==
=== Regular season and playoffs ===
			Regular season					Playoffs
Season	Team	League	GP	G	A	Pts	PIM	GP	G	A	Pts	PIM
1994–95	HC Slavia Praha	ELH	20	6	7	13	4	3	0	0	0	0
1995–96	HC Slavia Praha	ELH	20	3	1	4	6	3	0	0	0	0
1996–97	HC Slavia Praha	ELH	45	18	12	30	18	—	—	—	—	—
1997–98	HC Slavia Praha	ELH	14	2	5	7	6	—	—	—	—	—
1997–98	HC Keramika Plzeň	ELH	34	26	15	41	16	5	2	4	6	4
1998–99	HC Sparta Praha	ELH	52	23	14	37	30	8	5	2	7	0
1999–2000	JYP	SM-l	53	34	28	62	56	—	—	—	—	—
2000–01	HIFK	SM-l	56	32	28	60	51	5	3	1	4	0
2001–02	Los Angeles Kings	NHL	22	4	2	6	8	3	0	0	0	0
2001–02	Manchester Monarchs	AHL	48	16	21	37	16	—	—	—	—	—
2002–03	Los Angeles Kings	NHL	15	0	9	9	4	—	—	—	—	—
2002–03	Florida Panthers	NHL	52	5	13	18	14	—	—	—	—	—
2003–04	Florida Panthers	NHL	13	1	1	2	4	—	—	—	—	—
2003–04	San Antonio Rampage	AHL	2	2	1	3	0	—	—	—	—	—
2003–04	Avangard Omsk	RSL	29	10	5	15	34	11	2	0	2	2
2004–05	Avangard Omsk	RSL	53	12	16	28	56	10	2	1	3	6
2005–06	HC Slavia Praha	ELH	52	21	23	44	58	15	3	8	11	16
2006–07	HC Slavia Praha	ELH	52	22	23	45	66	6	1	4	5	0
2007–08	HC Slavia Praha	ELH	40	25	11	36	61	19	10	3	13	8
2008–09	HC Slavia Praha	ELH	46	27	41	68	44	18	12	12	24	8
2009–10	Torpedo Nizhny Novgorod	KHL	53	14	20	34	40	—	—	—	—	—
2010–11	HC Davos	NLA	45	21	28	49	20	12	5	12	17	6
2011–12	HC Lugano	NLA	45	16	33	49	18	6	1	1	2	4
2012–13	HC Slavia Praha	ELH	13	12	3	15	6	—	—	—	—	—
2012–13	HC Lugano	NLA	8	0	0	0	4	—	—	—	—	—
2012–13	HC Lugano	NLA	12	6	11	17	4	8	3	5	8	4
2013–14	HC Slavia Praha	ELH	47	21	27	48	16	4	2	1	3	0
2014–15	HC Slavia Praha	ELH	51	18	28	46	30	—	—	—	—	—
2015–16	Mountfield HK	ELH	50	13	29	42	44	6	4	2	6	8
2016–17	Mountfield HK	ELH	49	11	36	47	12	11	2	7	9	4
2017–18	Mountfield HK	ELH	46	15	27	42	20	12	1	4	5	4
2018–19	HC Stadion Vrchlabí	CZE.3	8	3	8	11	4	11	4	10	14	4
2019–20	HC Stadion Vrchlabí	CZE.3	32	24	44	68	20	—	—	—	—	—
2020–21	HC Slavia Praha	CZE.2	21	7	14	21	14	5	1	3	4	4
ELH totals			621	259	300	559	427	117	40	51	91	68
SM-liiga totals			109	66	56	122	107	5	3	1	4	0
NHL totals			102	10	25	35	30	3	0	0	0	0

=== International ===
Year	Team	Event	GP	G	A	Pts	PIM
2006	Czech Republic	WC	7	0	0	0	0
2007	Czech Republic	WC	7	1	0	1	0
Senior totals			14	1	0	1	0
