= Igor Volkov (ice hockey) =

Russian ice hockey player

- Born: January 24, 1983 (age 42); Ufa, Soviet Union
- Height: 6 ft 0 in (183 cm)
- Weight: 198 lb (90 kg; 14 st 2 lb)
- Position: Left wing
- Shot: Left
- KHL team Former teams: Free Agent; Salavat Yulaev Ufa; HC Dynamo Moscow; Avangard Omsk; HC Spartak Moscow; HC CSKA Moscow; HC Yugra; HC Neftekhimik Nizhnekamsk
- NHL draft: 246th overall, 2003; New York Islanders
- Playing career: 2000–2017

Igor Volkov (born January 24, 1983) is a Russian professional ice hockey player. He is currently an unrestricted free agent who most recently played with Toros Neftekamsk of the Supreme Hockey League (VHL).

Volkov made his Kontinental Hockey League (KHL) debut playing with Avangard Omsk during the 2008–09 KHL season. After a single season in 2013–14 with HC Spartak Moscow, Volkov signed as a free agent to a one-year contract with CSKA Moscow on May 7, 2014.

== Career statistics ==
			Regular season					Playoffs
Season	Team	League	GP	G	A	Pts	PIM	GP	G	A	Pts	PIM
1997–98	Novoil Ufa	RUS.3	3	0	0	0	0	—	—	—	—	—
1998–99	Novoil Ufa	RUS.3	24	12	5	17	6	—	—	—	—	—
1999–2000	Salavat Yulaev–2 Ufa	RUS.3	35	18	20	38	22	—	—	—	—	—
2000–01	Salavat Yulaev Ufa	RSL	30	1	1	2	4	—	—	—	—	—
2000–01	Salavat Yulaev–2 Ufa	RUS.3	24	12	10	22	18	—	—	—	—	—
2001–02	Salavat Yulaev Ufa	RSL	41	3	1	4	8	—	—	—	—	—
2001–02	Salavat Yulaev–2 Ufa	RUS.3	6	6	4	10	6	—	—	—	—	—
2002–03	Salavat Yulaev Ufa	RSL	41	9	5	14	32	3	1	0	1	4
2003–04	Salavat Yulaev Ufa	RSL	45	11	13	24	38	—	—	—	—	—
2004–05	Salavat Yulaev Ufa	RSL	43	15	12	27	38	—	—	—	—	—
2004–05	Dynamo Moscow	RSL	10	0	1	1	0	4	1	0	1	0
2005–06	Salavat Yulaev Ufa	RSL	46	18	13	31	22	6	1	1	2	16
2006–07	Salavat Yulaev Ufa	RSL	53	12	11	23	44	8	2	2	4	2
2007–08	Salavat Yulaev Ufa	RSL	50	14	9	23	16	16	9	2	11	2
2008–09	Avangard Omsk	KHL	41	8	9	17	24	9	0	2	2	2
2009–10	Avangard Omsk	KHL	55	11	11	22	54	3	0	1	1	2
2010–11	Salavat Yulaev Ufa	KHL	23	1	1	2	6	—	—	—	—	—
2010–11	Avangard Omsk	KHL	14	1	2	3	2	13	2	0	2	2
2011–12	Avangard Omsk	KHL	30	5	3	8	8	21	3	3	6	12
2012–13	Avangard Omsk	KHL	47	8	6	14	16	12	1	1	2	4
2013–14	Spartak Moscow	KHL	46	7	4	11	17	—	—	—	—	—
2014–15	CSKA Moscow	KHL	27	4	3	7	16	12	1	1	2	6
2015–16	HC Yugra	KHL	25	4	5	9	10	—	—	—	—	—
2015–16	Neftekhimik Nizhnekamsk	KHL	25	3	4	7	14	4	0	0	0	0
2016–17	Toros Neftekamsk	VHL	18	3	4	7	10	3	0	0	0	0
RSL totals			359	83	66	149	202	37	14	5	19	24
KHL totals			333	52	48	100	167	74	7	8	15	28
