= Sergei Konkov =

Russian ice hockey player

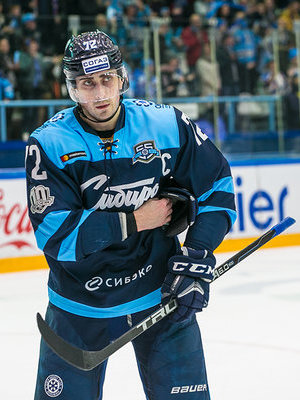
- Born: May 30, 1982 (age 44) Moscow, Russia
- Height: 6 ft 0 in (183 cm)
- Weight: 196 lb (89 kg; 14 st 0 lb)
- Position: Forward
- Shot: Right
- Played for: CSKA Moscow; Molot-Prikamie Perm; HC Neftekhimik Nizhnekamsk; Lokomotiv Yaroslavl; Dynamo Moscow; Sibir Novosibirsk; Admiral Vladivostok; Traktor Chelyabinsk
- Playing career: 2002–2020

Sergei Aleksandrovich Konkov (Russian: Сергей Александрович Коньков; born May 30, 1982) is a Russian former professional ice hockey winger. He most recently played for Traktor Chelyabinsk of the Kontinental Hockey League (KHL).

He made his professional debut in the top tier Russian Superleague in the 2002-03 season with HC CSKA Moscow, before moving and most notably playing with HC Neftekhimik Nizhnekamsk and later Admiral Vladivostok in the KHL.

== Career statistics ==
			Regular season					Playoffs
Season	Team	League	GP	G	A	Pts	PIM	GP	G	A	Pts	PIM
1997–98	Krylya Sovetov Moscow-2	Russia3	2	0	0	0	2	—	—	—	—	—
1998–99	Krylya Sovetov Moscow	Russia	—	—	—	—	—	—	—	—	—	—
1999–00	HC CSKA Moscow	Russia2	29	6	5	11	4	—	—	—	—	—
1999–00	HC CSKA Moscow-2	Russia3	17	11	3	14	6	—	—	—	—	—
2000–01	HC CSKA Moscow	Russia2	44	11	9	20	16	—	—	—	—	—
2000–01	HC CSKA Moscow-2	Russia3	8	1	1	2	0	—	—	—	—	—
2001–02	HC CSKA Moscow	Russia2	49	14	11	25	18	—	—	—	—	—
2001–02	HC CSKA Moscow-2	Russia3	4	2	3	5	0	—	—	—	—	—
2002–03	HC CSKA Moscow	Russia	2	0	0	0	0	—	—	—	—	—
2002–03	HC CSKA Moscow-2	Russia3	18	12	6	18	12	—	—	—	—	—
2002–03	Molot-Prikamye Perm	Russia	15	3	3	6	6	—	—	—	—	—
2002–03	Molot-Prikamye Perm-2	Russia3	2	0	0	0	2	—	—	—	—	—
2003–04	HC Neftekhimik Nizhnekamsk	Russia	39	3	7	10	6	4	0	0	0	0
2003–04	HC Neftekhimik Nizhnekamsk-2	Russia3	2	2	0	2	0	—	—	—	—	—
2004–05	HC Neftekhimik Nizhnekamsk	Russia	58	14	9	23	24	3	0	2	2	2
2005–06	HC Neftekhimik Nizhnekamsk	Russia	47	7	9	16	26	5	1	1	2	2
2006–07	HC Neftekhimik Nizhnekamsk	Russia	54	16	12	28	28	4	1	2	3	2
2007–08	Lokomotiv Yaroslavl	Russia	56	15	15	30	22	16	5	3	8	12
2008–09	Lokomotiv Yaroslavl	KHL	53	13	10	23	16	11	2	0	2	8
2009–10	Lokomotiv Yaroslavl	KHL	38	11	9	20	12	—	—	—	—	—
2009–10	HC Neftekhimik Nizhnekamsk	KHL	12	1	4	5	6	9	1	2	3	2
2010–11	HC Neftekhimik Nizhnekamsk	KHL	53	18	21	39	57	7	0	0	0	2
2011–12	HC Dynamo Moscow	KHL	47	10	17	27	22	11	0	0	0	2
2012–13	HC Dynamo Moscow	KHL	23	1	1	2	6	20	4	2	6	10
2012–13	Dynamo Balashikha	VHL	2	0	0	0	2	—	—	—	—	—
2013–14	Lokomotiv Yaroslavl	KHL	27	3	6	9	8	18	8	4	12	10
2014–15	Lokomotiv Yaroslavl	KHL	57	13	17	30	53	6	0	2	2	0
2015–16	Lokomotiv Yaroslavl	KHL	55	6	5	11	24	2	0	0	0	4
2016–17	HC Neftekhimik Nizhnekamsk	KHL	60	7	5	12	12	—	—	—	—	—
2017–18	HC Sibir Novosibirsk	KHL	56	8	8	16	30	—	—	—	—	—
2018–19	Admiral Vladivostok	KHL	62	12	10	22	18	—	—	—	—	—
2019–20	Traktor Chelyabinsk	KHL	22	1	0	1	0	—	—	—	—	—
KHL totals			565	104	113	217	264	84	15	10	25	38
Russia totals			271	58	55	113	112	32	7	8	15	18
