= Sinuhe Wallinheimo =

Finnish ice hockey player and politician

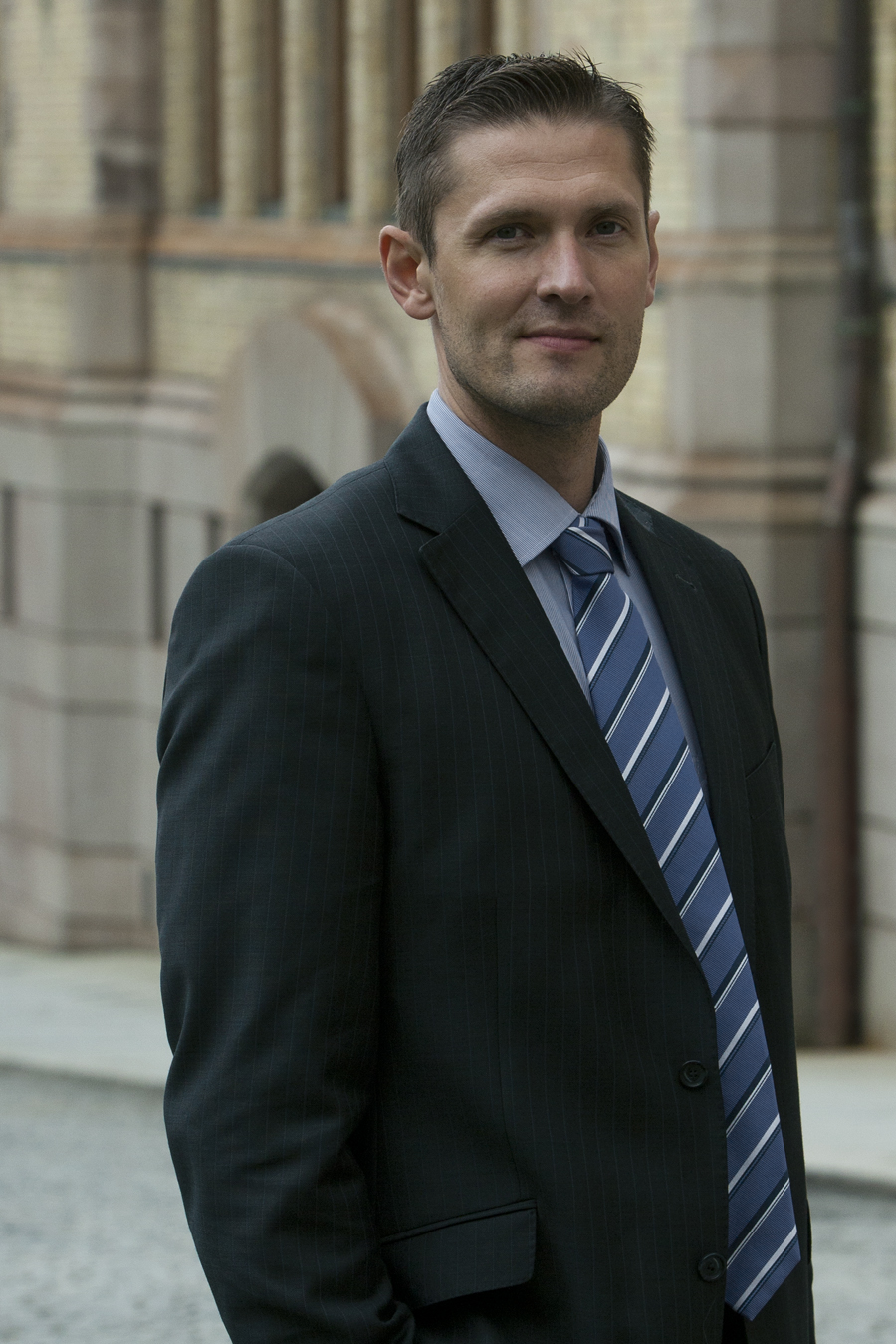
- Born: March 9, 1972 (age 54) Jyväskylä, Central Finland, Finland
- Height: 6 ft 1.7 in (187 cm)
- Weight: 200 lb (91 kg; 14 st 4 lb)
- Position: Goaltender
- Catches: Right
- SM-liiga team Former teams: JYP; KHL; HC Dynamo Moscow; Elitserien; Färjestads BK; DEL; Revier Lions; SM-liiga; Lukko; AHL; Springfield Falcons; Hershey Bears; ECHL; Mississippi Sea Wolves; Mobile Mysticks; NCAA; University of Denver
- Playing career: 1989–present

Mika Sinuhe Wallinheimo (born March 9, 1972, in Jyväskylä, Finland) is a Finnish politician and former professional ice hockey goaltender. As the last team he represented JYP in the SM-liiga. After his sporting career he entered politics and was elected to the Parliament of Finland as an MP for the National Coalition Party in the 2011 election and reelected in 2015 and 2019. His parents derived his name Sinuhe from the protagonist of the novel The Egyptian. Wallinheimo was the first person in Finland to be named Sinuhe.On April 29th, 2026 he was elected Chair of the Grand Committee, which is the Finnish Parliaments committee responsible for EU-related matters.

== International play ==
Wallinheimo was selected to the 2006 Men's World Ice Hockey Championships as the third goaltender. Wallinheimo was dropped from the roster when Antero Niittymäki joined the team, but he made his international debut in a practice game against Denmark. In the 2006–07 season, Wallinheimo represented Finland on the Euro Hockey Tour, being chosen best goaltender in both the Ceska Pojistovna Cup and Karjala Tournament.

== Amateur career ==
Wallinheimo played for the University of Denver, known for his unusual fan interactions during stoppages of play.

== Music career ==
Wallinheimo was the lead singer of S.W. Heimon kädet, a band formed on 1992 when the members were playing hockey in the JYP (Jyväskylä). The "S.W." in the band's name is Wallinheimo's initials.

== Awards and honors ==
Award	Year
All-WCHA Second Team	1994–95

== Career statistics ==
Year	Tournament	GP	W	L	T	MIN	SA	GA	SO	GAA	SV%
2006–07	EHT	4	2	1	1	244.36	120	6	0	1.47	.950
