= Daniel Henriksson =

Swedish ice hockey player

- Born: September 4, 1978 (age 48) Övertorneå, Sweden
- Height: 5 ft 10 in (178 cm)
- Weight: 163 lb (74 kg; 11 st 9 lb)
- Position: Goaltender
- Caught: Left
- Played for: Luleå HF; Färjestads BK; Sibir Novosibirsk; EC Red Bull Salzburg; Linköpings HC
- National team: Sweden
- Playing career: 1997–2009
Medal record
Representing Sweden
World Championships
| Gold medal – first place | 2006 Riga |
| Silver medal – second place | 2004 Prague |

Daniel Henriksson (born September 4, 1978) is a retired Swedish professional ice hockey goaltender. During his career he played for Luleå HF, Färjestads BK, and Linköpings HC in Elitserien, for Sibir Novosibirsk in the Russian Super League and for EC Red Bull Salzburg in the Austrian Hockey League. He won the Swedish Championship with Färjestad in 2006.

He represented Sweden at three Ice Hockey World Championships, winning a gold medal in 2006 and a silver medal in 2004.
