= Josef Straka (ice hockey) =

Czech ice hockey player

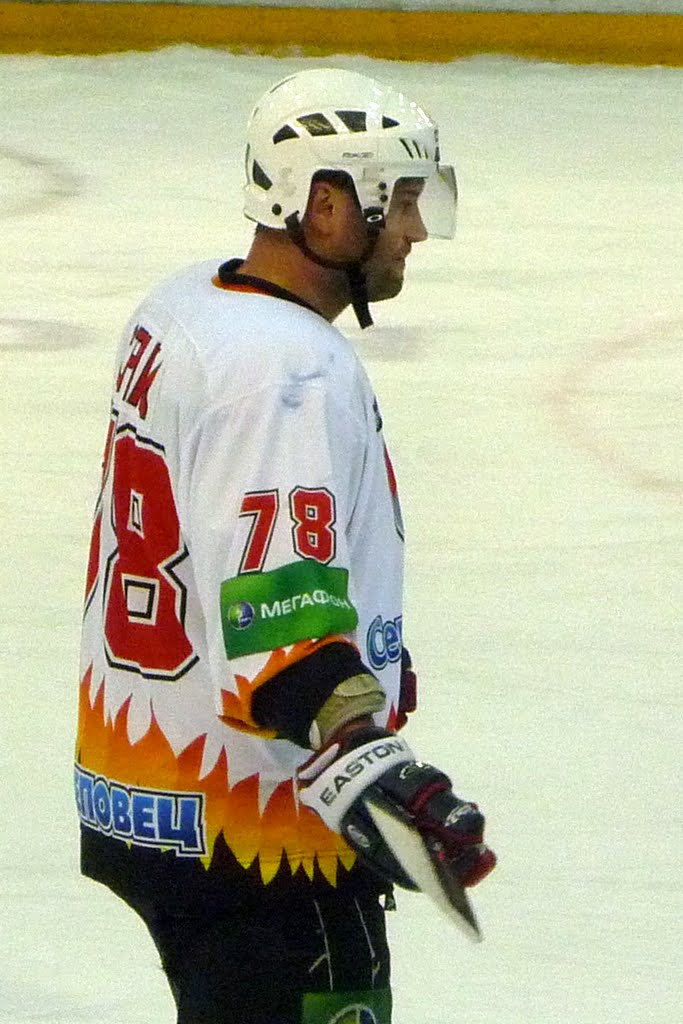
- Born: 11 February 1978 Jindřichův Hradec, Czechoslovakia
- Height: 5 ft 11 in (180 cm)
- Weight: 194 lb (88 kg; 13 st 12 lb)
- Position: Centre
- Shoots: Right
- Regionalliga team Former teams: EHC Waldkraiburg; KHL; Severstal Cherepovets; Ak Bars Kazan; Avtomobilist Yekaterinburg; Czech Extraliga; HC Litvínov; HC Plzeň; HC Sparta Praha; HC Znojemští Orli; KLH Chomutov
- National team: Czech Republic
- NHL draft: 122nd overall, 1996; Calgary Flames
- Playing career: 1995–present

Josef Straka (born 11 February 1978) is a Czech professional ice hockey centre. He currently plays for EHC Waldkraiburg of the Regionalliga. Straka was selected by the Calgary Flames in the 5th round (122nd overall) of the 1996 NHL entry draft.

Straka has spent several seasons in the Kontinental Hockey League (KHL).

He was a teammate with his namesake, the former NHL player Martin Straka, when Martin played with HC Plzeň during the 2004–05 NHL lockout.
