= 2006–07 Elitserien season =

- League: Elitserien
- Sport: Ice hockey
- Duration: September 18, 2006 – March 2, 2007

Regular season
- League champion: Färjestads BK
- Season MVP: Per Svartvadet (Modo Hockey)
- Top scorer: Fredrik Bremberg (Djurgårdens IF)

Playoffs

Finals
- Champions: Modo Hockey
- Runners-up: Linköpings HC

SHL seasons
- ← 2005–06 2007–08 →

The 2006–07 Elitserien season was the 32nd season of Elitserien. It began on September 18, 2006, with the regular season ending March 2, 2007. The playoffs of the 84th Swedish Championship concluded on April 14, with Modo Hockey defeating Linköpings HC to win their second championship title.

== Regular season ==
=== Final standings ===
GP = Games Played, W = Wins, L = Losses, T = Ties, OTW = Overtime Wins, OTL = Overtime Losses, GF = Goals For, GA = Goals Against, Pts = Points

Elitserien	GP	W	L	T	OTW	OTL	GF	GA	Pts
y-Färjestads BK	55	26	13	7	5	4	197	145	99
x-HV71	55	25	15	9	3	3	170	150	93
x-Modo Hockey	55	24	21	4	3	3	159	140	85
x-Linköpings HC	55	22	19	7	2	5	151	153	82
x-Timrå IK	55	22	21	5	4	3	129	136	82
x-Brynäs IF	55	18	17	12	6	2	146	137	80
x-Luleå HF	55	21	23	4	5	2	171	163	79
x-Mora IK	55	23	23	6	0	3	147	155	78
e-Frölunda HC	55	22	24	6	1	2	167	162	76
e-Djurgårdens IF	55	19	22	8	5	1	146	148	76
r-Skellefteå AIK	55	18	24	4	6	3	139	178	73
r-Malmö Redhawks	55	11	29	6	0	9	119	174	48

x - clinched playoff spot, y - clinched regular season league title, e - eliminated from playoff contention, r - play in relegation series

== Playoffs ==
After the regular season, the standard of 8 teams qualified for the playoffs.

=== Playoff bracket ===
In the first round, the highest remaining seed chose which of the four lowest remaining seeds to be matched against. In the second round, the highest remaining seed was matched against the lowest remaining seed. In each round the higher-seeded team was awarded home ice advantage. Each best-of-seven series followed a 1–1–1–2–1–1 format: the higher-seeded team played at home for games 2 and 4 (plus 5 and 7 if necessary), and the lower-seeded team was at home for game 1, 3 and 6 (if necessary).

Quarterfinals
1	Färjestads BK	4
8	Mora IK	0
2	HV71	4
6	Brynäs IF	3
(Pairings are reseeded after the first round)
3	Modo Hockey	4
5	Timrå IK	3
4	Linköpings HC	4
7	Luleå HF	0

Semifinals
1	Färjestads BK	1
4	Linköpings HC	4
2	HV71	3
3	Modo Hockey	4

Finals
3	Modo Hockey	4
4	Linköpings HC	2

Swedish Champions
2006–07
Modo Hockey
Second Title

=== Finals ===
April 4, 2007	Linköpings HC	5–1	MODO Hockey	Cloetta Center

April 6, 2007	MODO Hockey	3–2	Linköpings HC	Swedbank Arena

April 8, 2007	Linköpings HC	2–1	MODO Hockey	Cloetta Center

April 10, 2007	MODO Hockey	5–1	Linköpings HC	Swedbank Arena

April 12, 2007	MODO Hockey	2–1	Linköpings HC	Swedbank Arena

April 14, 2007	Linköpings HC	2–3	MODO Hockey	Cloetta Center

== Elitserien awards ==
Le Mat Trophy: Modo Hockey
Guldpucken: Per Svartvadet, Modo Hockey
Guldhjälmen: Fredrik Bremberg, Djurgårdens IF
Honken Trophy: Erik Ersberg, HV71
Håkan Loob Trophy: Pavel Brendl, Mora IK
Rookie of the Year: Patric Hörnqvist, Djurgårdens IF
Guldpipan: Thomas Andersson, Gävle

== See also ==
- 2006 in sports
- 2007 in sports
