= Petr Schastlivy =

Russian ice hockey player (born 1979)

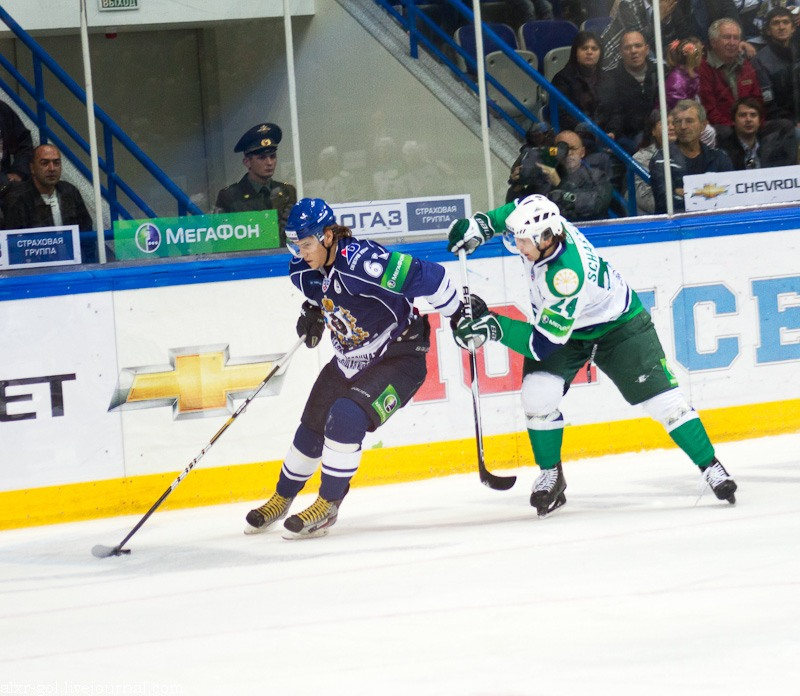
- Born: April 18, 1979 (age 47) Vikhorevka, Soviet Union
- Height: 6 ft 0 in (183 cm)
- Weight: 185 lb (84 kg; 13 st 3 lb)
- Position: Left wing
- Shoots: Left
- team Former teams: Free agent Yermak Angarsk; Lokomotiv Yaroslavl; Ottawa Senators; Grand Rapids Griffins; Mighty Ducks of Anaheim; Khimik Moscow Oblast; CSKA Moscow; Salavat Yulaev Ufa; Torpedo Nizhny Novgorod; HC Sarov; Dinamo Riga; HC Sochi; Metallurg Novokuznetsk; HSC Csíkszereda
- National team: Russia
- NHL draft: 101st overall, 1998; Ottawa Senators
- Playing career: 1998–present

Pyotr "Petr" Vasilievich Schastlivy (Russian: Пётр Васильевич Счастливый; born April 18, 1979) is a Russian professional ice hockey player, who is currently a free agent having last played for HSC Csíkszereda. He played a total of 129 games in the National Hockey League (NHL) with the Ottawa Senators and Mighty Ducks of Anaheim, as well as several minor league professional teams.

He is married to the Latvian long jumper Ineta Radēviča.

== Playing career ==
Schastlivy was the 4th round pick (101st overall) of the Ottawa Senators in the 1998 NHL entry draft. Schastlivy played one season with Torpedo Yaroslavl of the Russian League before coming to North America for the 1999–00 season. Schastlivy began the season with the Grand Rapids Griffins of the IHL, though was called up to the Senators, where he played 13 games and his only playoff game to date.

He spent the 2000–01 and 2001–02 seasons playing with both the Senators and Griffins, before being traded to the Mighty Ducks of Anaheim in February 2004, in exchange for Todd Simpson. He played 22 more games for the Mighty Ducks at the end of the 2003–04 season, before returning to Russia to continue to play hockey. Since leaving the NHL, he has played with Lokomotiv Yaroslavl, Khimik Moscow Oblast, CSKA Moscow, Salavat Yulaev Ufa, Torpedo Nizhny Novgorod, Dinamo Riga and HC Sochi of the Kontinental Hockey League.

== Career statistics ==
=== Regular season and playoffs ===
			Regular season					Playoffs
Season	Team	League	GP	G	A	Pts	PIM	GP	G	A	Pts	PIM
1997–98	Torpedo Yaroslavl	RSL	4	0	0	0	0	—	—	—	—	—
1998–99	Torpedo Yaroslavl	RSL	40	6	1	7	28	—	—	—	—	—
1999–00	Grand Rapids Griffins	IHL	46	16	12	28	10	17	8	7	15	6
1999–00	Ottawa Senators	NHL	13	2	5	7	2	1	0	0	0	0
2000–01	Grand Rapids Griffins	IHL	43	10	14	24	10	7	4	4	8	0
2000–01	Ottawa Senators	NHL	17	3	2	5	6	—	—	—	—	—
2001–02	Grand Rapids Griffins	AHL	31	22	13	35	10	—	—	—	—	—
2001–02	Ottawa Senators	NHL	1	0	1	1	0	—	—	—	—	—
2002–03	Ottawa Senators	NHL	33	9	10	19	4	—	—	—	—	—
2003–04	Ottawa Senators	NHL	43	2	4	6	14	—	—	—	—	—
2003–04	Mighty Ducks of Anaheim	NHL	22	2	0	2	4	—	—	—	—	—
2004–05	Lokomotiv Yaroslavl	RSL	59	15	15	30	28	9	1	3	4	2
2005–06	Lokomotiv Yaroslavl	RSL	49	14	15	29	47	11	4	4	8	10
2006–07	Khimik Moscow Oblast	RSL	54	16	19	35	32	9	1	1	2	4
2007–08	CSKA Moscow	RSL	23	4	6	10	8	6	3	0	3	4
2008–09	CSKA Moscow	KHL	54	19	12	31	22	8	0	1	1	4
2009–10	CSKA Moscow	KHL	42	11	13	24	14	—	—	—	—	—
2009–10	Salavat Yulaev Ufa	KHL	7	1	3	4	0	16	2	1	3	4
2010–11	Salavat Yulaev Ufa	KHL	53	10	13	23	14	21	5	0	5	6
2011–12	Salavat Yulaev Ufa	KHL	54	8	9	17	14	6	0	0	0	0
2012–13	Torpedo Nizhny Novgorod	KHL	43	10	9	19	12	—	—	—	—	—
2013–14	Torpedo Nizhny Novgorod	KHL	22	0	2	2	6	—	—	—	—	—
2013–14	HC Sarov	VHL	10	4	5	9	2	—	—	—	—	—
2014–15	Dinamo Riga	KHL	27	5	5	10	4	—	—	—	—	—
2014–15	HC Sochi	KHL	22	5	4	9	8	4	0	2	2	2
2015–16	HC Sochi	KHL	46	8	9	17	21	4	0	0	0	0
NHL totals			129	18	22	40	30	1	0	0	0	0
KHL totals			370	77	79	156	115	59	7	4	11	16

=== International ===
Year	Team	Event	Result	GP	G	A	Pts	PIM
1999	Russia	WJC	1st place, gold medalist(s)	7	3	4	7	4
2007	Russia	WC	3rd place, bronze medalist(s)	8	3	1	4	2
Junior totals				7	3	4	7	4
Senior totals				8	3	1	4	2
