= Ivan Nepryaev =

Russian ice hockey player

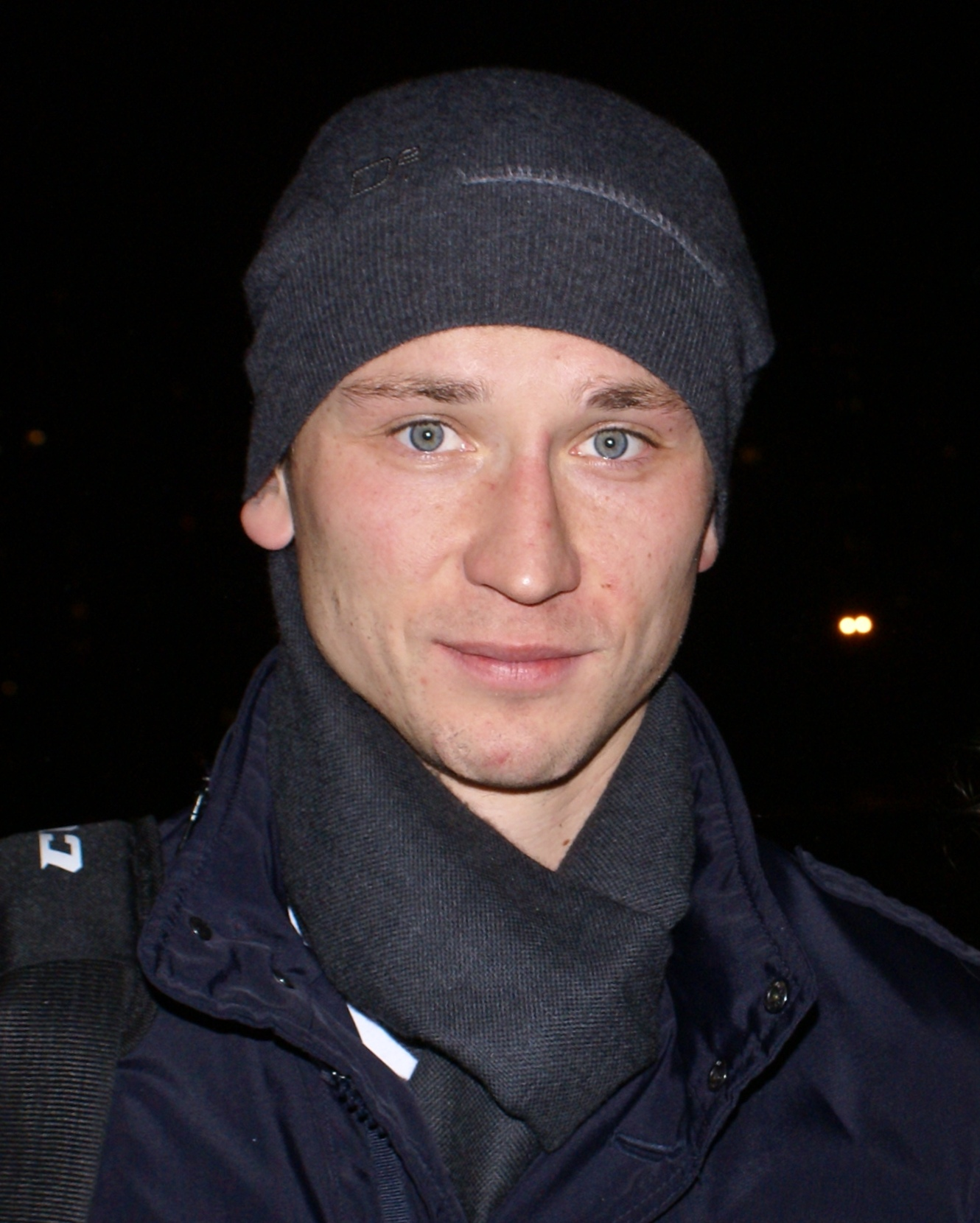
- Nepryaev in 2011
- Born: 4 February 1982 (age 44) Yaroslavl, Soviet Union
- Height: 6 ft 2 in (188 cm)
- Weight: 187 lb (85 kg; 13 st 5 lb)
- Position: Center
- Shot: Left
- Played for: Lokomotiv Yaroslavl; HC Dynamo Moscow; Avangard Omsk
- National team: Russia
- NHL draft: 163rd overall, 2000; Washington Capitals
- Playing career: 2000–2015

Ivan Nikolaevich Nepryaev (born 4 February 1982) is a Russian ice hockey forward. He currently plays for Avangard Omsk of the Kontinental Hockey League. He was selected as a prospect by the Washington Capitals in the fifth round (#163 overall) of the 2000 NHL entry draft.

== Honours ==
- Russian championship: 2002, 2003

== Career statistics ==
=== Regular season and playoffs ===
| | | | Regular season | | | | | Playoffs |
| Season | Team | League | GP | G | A | Pts | PIM | GP | G | A | Pts | PIM |
|---|---|---|---|---|---|---|---|---|---|---|---|---|
| 1998–99 | Torpedo–2 Yaroslavl | RUS.2 | 15 | 1 | 0 | 1 | 0 | — | — | — | — | — |
| 1999–2000 | Torpedo–2 Yaroslavl | RUS.3 | 43 | 9 | 14 | 23 | 38 | — | — | — | — | — |
| 2000–01 | Lokomotiv Yaroslavl | RSL | 12 | 0 | 0 | 0 | 2 | — | — | — | — | — |
| 2000–01 | Lokomotiv–2 Yaroslavl | RUS.3 | 22 | 14 | 9 | 23 | 24 | — | — | — | — | — |
| 2001–02 | Lokomotiv Yaroslavl | RSL | 37 | 3 | 8 | 11 | 30 | — | — | — | — | — |
| 2001–02 | Lokomotiv–2 Yaroslavl | RUS.3 | 2 | 1 | 0 | 1 | 18 | — | — | — | — | — |
| 2002–03 | Lokomotiv Yaroslavl | RSL | 26 | 3 | 6 | 9 | 12 | 6 | 1 | 0 | 1 | 0 |
| 2002–03 | Lokomotiv–2 Yaroslavl | RUS.3 | 14 | 11 | 9 | 20 | 42 | — | — | — | — | — |
| 2003–04 | Lokomotiv Yaroslavl | RSL | 29 | 4 | 6 | 10 | 28 | 3 | 0 | 0 | 0 | 6 |
| 2003–04 | Lokomotiv–2 Yaroslavl | RUS.3 | 15 | 5 | 12 | 17 | 16 | — | — | — | — | — |
| 2004–05 | Lokomotiv Yaroslavl | RSL | 56 | 10 | 10 | 20 | 73 | 9 | 1 | 0 | 1 | 16 |
| 2005–06 | Lokomotiv Yaroslavl | RSL | 43 | 7 | 16 | 23 | 70 | 11 | 0 | 0 | 0 | 8 |
| 2006–07 | Lokomotiv Yaroslavl | RSL | 52 | 17 | 9 | 26 | 66 | 7 | 0 | 4 | 4 | 2 |
| 2007–08 | Lokomotiv Yaroslavl | RSL | 56 | 9 | 17 | 26 | 84 | 15 | 3 | 6 | 9 | 41 |
| 2008–09 | Dynamo Moscow | KHL | 52 | 14 | 13 | 27 | 48 | 12 | 0 | 4 | 4 | 10 |
| 2009–10 | Dynamo Moscow | KHL | 44 | 4 | 9 | 13 | 46 | 4 | 0 | 0 | 0 | 4 |
| 2010–11 | Atlant Mytishchi | KHL | 54 | 5 | 10 | 15 | 50 | 24 | 4 | 3 | 7 | 49 |
| 2011–12 | SKA St. Petersburg | KHL | 55 | 11 | 9 | 20 | 58 | 15 | 3 | 6 | 9 | 6 |
| 2012–13 | SKA St. Petersburg | KHL | 43 | 3 | 3 | 6 | 22 | 9 | 1 | 2 | 3 | 12 |
| 2013–14 | CSKA Moscow | KHL | 39 | 3 | 2 | 5 | 36 | 4 | 0 | 0 | 0 | 2 |
| 2014–15 | Avangard Omsk | KHL | 37 | 1 | 4 | 5 | 34 | 5 | 0 | 0 | 0 | 7 |
| RSL totals | | | 311 | 53 | 72 | 125 | 365 | 51 | 5 | 10 | 15 | 73 |
| KHL totals | | | 322 | 41 | 50 | 91 | 294 | 73 | 8 | 15 | 23 | 90 |

=== International ===
| Year | Team | Event | Result | GP | G | A | Pts | PIM |
|---|---|---|---|---|---|---|---|---|
| 2001 | Russia | WJC | 7th | 7 | 1 | 5 | 6 | 12 |
| 2002 | Russia | WJC | 1st place, gold medalist(s) | 7 | 0 | 2 | 2 | 14 |
| 2005 | Russia | WC | 3rd place, bronze medalist(s) | 6 | 1 | 0 | 1 | 0 |
| 2006 | Russia | OG | 4th | 2 | 0 | 0 | 0 | 2 |
| 2007 | Russia | WC | 3rd place, bronze medalist(s) | 9 | 0 | 3 | 3 | 12 |
| Junior totals | | | | 14 | 1 | 7 | 8 | 26 |
| Senior totals | | | | 17 | 1 | 3 | 4 | 14 |
