= 2005–06 Elitserien season =

- League: Elitserien
- Sport: Ice hockey
- Duration: September 26, 2005 – March 6, 2006

Regular season
- League champion: HV71
- Season MVP: Kenny Jönsson (Rögle BK)
- Top scorer: Andreas Karlsson (HV71)

Playoffs

Finals
- Champions: Färjestads BK
- Runners-up: Frölunda HC

SHL seasons
- ← 2004–05 2006–07 →

The 2005–06 Elitserien season was the 31st season of Elitserien. It ran from September 26, 2005, until March 6, 2006, with the Elitserien playoffs, the 82nd Swedish Championship, to April 18, with Färjestads BK taking the championship.

== Regular season ==
=== Final standings ===
GP = Games Played, W = Wins, L = Losses, T = Ties, OTL = Overtime Losses, GF = Goals For, GA = Goals Against, Pts = Points

| Elitserien | GP | W | L | T | OTL | GF | GA | Pts |
|---|---|---|---|---|---|---|---|---|
| y-HV71 | 50 | 29 | 10 | 7 | 4 | 164 | 107 | 102 |
| x-Frölunda HC | 50 | 28 | 8 | 12 | 2 | 169 | 130 | 96 |
| x-Linköpings HC | 50 | 25 | 14 | 6 | 5 | 150 | 117 | 92 |
| x-Färjestads BK | 50 | 23 | 11 | 12 | 4 | 134 | 116 | 84 |
| x-Luleå HF | 50 | 22 | 12 | 11 | 5 | 147 | 124 | 83 |
| x-Modo Hockey | 50 | 24 | 9 | 16 | 1 | 129 | 107 | 81 |
| x-Brynäs IF | 50 | 16 | 15 | 14 | 5 | 114 | 129 | 67 |
| x-Mora IK | 50 | 17 | 11 | 20 | 2 | 123 | 135 | 66 |
| e-Timrå IK | 50 | 16 | 10 | 21 | 3 | 104 | 128 | 59 |
| e-Djurgårdens IF | 50 | 13 | 13 | 21 | 3 | 124 | 160 | 58 |
| r-Södertälje SK | 50 | 11 | 10 | 25 | 4 | 110 | 161 | 44 |
| r-Leksands IF | 50 | 9 | 11 | 28 | 2 | 96 | 150 | 41 |

x - clinched playoff spot, y - clinched regular season league title, e - eliminated from playoff contention, r - play in relegation series

== Playoffs ==
After the regular season, the standard of 8 teams qualified for the playoffs.

=== Playoff bracket ===
In the first round, the highest remaining seed chose which of the four lowest remaining seeds to be matched against. In the second round, the highest remaining seed was matched against the lowest remaining seed. In each round the higher-seeded team was awarded home ice advantage. Each best-of-seven series followed a 1–1–1–2–1–1 format: the higher-seeded team played at home for games 2 and 4 (plus 5 and 7 if necessary), and the lower-seeded team was at home for game 1, 3 and 6 (if necessary).

Quarterfinals
1 | HV71 | 4
8 | Mora IK | 1
2 | Frölunda HC | 4
7 | Brynäs IF | 0
(Pairings are reseeded after the first round)
3 | Linköping HC | 4
5 | Luleå HF | 2
4 | Färjestads BK | 4
6 | Modo Hockey | 1

Semifinals
1 | HV71 | 3
4 | Färjestads BK | 4
2 | Frölunda HC | 4
3 | Linköping HC | 3

Finals
2 | Frölunda HC | 2
4 | Färjestads BK | 4

Swedish Champions
2005–06
Färjestads BK
Seventh Title

== Elitserien awards ==
| Le Mat Trophy: Färjestads BK |
| Guldpucken: Kenny Jönsson, Rögle BK |
| Guldhjälmen: Andreas Karlsson, HV71 |
| Honken Trophy: Johan Holmqvist, Brynäs IF |
| Håkan Loob Trophy: Tomi Kallio, Frölunda HC; Andreas Karlsson, HV71 |
| Rookie of the Year: Nicklas Bäckström, Brynäs IF |
| Guldpipan: Thomas Andersson, Gävle |

== See also ==
- 2005 in sports
- 2006 in sports
