= 2007–08 HV71 season =

Swedish ice hockey club season

2007–08 HV71
- Elitserien champions
- League: 1st SHL
- 2007–08 record: 31–13–11
- Home record: 18–4–6
- Road record: 13–9–5
- Goals for: 178
- Goals against: 132

Team information
- General manager: Fredrik Stillman
- Coach: Kent Johansson
- Captain: Johan Davidsson
- Alternate captains: Per Gustafsson; David Petrasek
- Arena: Kinnarps Arena
- Average attendance: 7,002 (99%)

Team leaders
- Goals: Jukka Voutilainen (26)
- Assists: Johan Davidsson (34)
- Points: Jukka Voutilainen (46)
- Penalty minutes: Lance Ward (212)
- Goals against average: Stefan Liv (2.26)

The 2007–08 HV71 season began September 24, 2007 against Frölunda HC. It was the club's 24th season in the Swedish elite league Elitserien.

After winning their game against Modo Hockey in overtime on February 28, HV71 clinched the regular season league title, for a total of three times. HV71 won the playoffs on April 18, winning the sixth game in the finals by 3-2 and the series 4-2 against Linköpings HC. This was their third time becoming Swedish Champions in the club's history.

== Regular season ==
=== Standings ===
| Elitserien | GP | W | L | T | OTW | OTL | GF | GA | Pts |
|---|---|---|---|---|---|---|---|---|---|
| y – HV71 | 55 | 31 | 13 | 11 | 3 | 4 | 178 | 132 | 107 |
| x – Linköpings HC | 55 | 21 | 14 | 20 | 9 | 4 | 166 | 153 | 92 |
| x – Modo Hockey | 55 | 26 | 22 | 7 | 5 | 1 | 153 | 150 | 90 |
| x – Färjestads BK | 55 | 25 | 19 | 11 | 3 | 3 | 169 | 147 | 89 |
| x – Timrå IK | 55 | 23 | 23 | 9 | 5 | 2 | 134 | 136 | 83 |
| x – Frölunda HC | 55 | 23 | 22 | 10 | 3 | 4 | 159 | 157 | 82 |
| x – Djurgårdens IF Hockey | 55 | 21 | 20 | 14 | 2 | 2 | 145 | 139 | 79 |
| x – Skellefteå AIK | 55 | 19 | 20 | 16 | 2 | 6 | 135 | 141 | 75 |
| e – Södertälje SK | 55 | 18 | 24 | 13 | 2 | 4 | 123 | 129 | 69 |
| e – Luleå HF | 55 | 17 | 25 | 13 | 2 | 6 | 139 | 164 | 66 |
| r – Mora IK | 55 | 17 | 25 | 13 | 2 | 4 | 133 | 160 | 66 |
| r – Brynäs IF | 55 | 16 | 30 | 9 | 4 | 2 | 152 | 178 | 61 |

x – clinched playoff spot; y – clinched regular season league title; e – eliminated from playoff contention; r – played in regulation series

=== Game log ===
2007–08 Game log

September: 2–0–1 (Home: 1–0–1; Road: 1–0–0)
| # | Date | Visitor | Score | Home | OT | Decision | Attendance | Record | Pts | Recap |
| 1 | September 24 | Frölunda HC | 5 – 6 | HV71 | | Liv | 7,038 | 1–0–0 | 3 |
| 2 | September 27 | HV71 | 2 – 1 | Skellefteå AIK | | Liv | 5,800 | 2–0–0 | 6 |
| 3 | September 29 | Djurgårdens IF | 4 – 4 | HV71 | OT | Liv | 6,920 | 2–0–1 | 7 |

October: 8–3–1 (Home: 5–0–1; Road: 3–3–0)
| # | Date | Visitor | Score | Home | OT | Decision | Attendance | Record | Pts | Recap |
| 4 | October 1 | HV71 | 2 – 3 | Mora IK | | Liv | 3,580 | 2–1–1 | 7 |
| 5 | October 4 | Timrå IK | 1 – 2 | HV71 | | Liv | 6,944 | 3–1–1 | 10 |
| 6 | October 6 | HV71 | 5 – 4 | Brynäs IF | | Liv | 6,441 | 4–1–1 | 13 |
| 7 | October 9 | Luleå HF | 0 – 4 | HV71 | | Liv | 7,016 | 5–1–1 | 16 |
| 8 | October 11 | HV71 | 3 – 6 | Linköpings HC | | Andersson | 8,246 | 5–2–1 | 16 |
| 9 | October 13 | Södertälje SK | 1 – 4 | HV71 | | Andersson | 7,006 | 6–2–1 | 19 |
| 10 | October 16 | HV71 | 4 – 3 | Modo Hockey | | Liv | 6,468 | 7–2–1 | 22 |
| 11 | October 20 | Färjestads BK | 0 – 3 | HV71 | | Liv | 7,038 | 8–2–1 | 25 |
| 12 | October 22 | HV71 | 2 – 5 | Färjestads BK | | Liv | 7,196 | 8–3–1 | 25 |
| 13 | October 25 | Modo Hockey | 2 – 3 | HV71 | | Liv | 7,038 | 9–3–1 | 28 |
| 14 | October 27 | HV71 | 3 – 0 | Södertälje SK | | Liv | 4,419 | 10–3–1 | 31 |
| 15 | October 29 | Linköpings HC | 5 – 6 | HV71 | OT | Liv | 7,038 | 10–3–2 | 33 |

November: 6–2–1 (Home: 4–0–0; Road: 2–2–1)
| # | Date | Visitor | Score | Home | OT | Decision | Attendance | Record | Pts | Recap |
| 16 | November 1 | HV71 | 2 – 2 | Luleå HF | OT | Liv | 4,226 | 10–3–3 | 34 |
| 17 | November 3 | Brynäs IF | 1 – 5 | HV71 | | Liv | 7,038 | 11–3–3 | 37 |
| 18 | November 15 | HV71 | 1 – 3 | Timrå IK | | Liv | 5,714 | 11–4–3 | 37 |
| 19 | November 17 | Mora IK | 2 – 4 | HV71 | | Andersson | 6,946 | 12–4–3 | 40 |
| 20 | November 19 | HV71 | 8 – 2 | Djurgårdens IF | | Andersson | 7,098 | 13–4–3 | 43 |
| 21 | November 22 | Skellefteå AIK | 2 – 6 | HV71 | | Liv | 6,941 | 14–4–3 | 46 |
| 22 | November 24 | HV71 | 3 – 2 | Frölunda HC | | Liv | 12,044 | 15–4–3 | 49 |
| 23 | November 26 | Frölunda HC | 3 – 5 | HV71 | | Liv | 7,038 | 16–4–3 | 52 |
| 24 | November 29 | HV71 | 3 – 4 | Mora IK | | Liv | 3,490 | 16–5–3 | 52 |

December: 4–2–2 (Home: 1–1–2; Road: 3–1–0)
| # | Date | Visitor | Score | Home | OT | Decision | Attendance | Record | Pts | Recap |
| 25 | December 1 | Färjestads BK | 1 – 3 | HV71 | | Liv | 7,038 | 17–5–3 | 55 |
| 26 | December 4 | HV71 | 3 – 2 | Södertälje SK | | Liv | 2,987 | 18–5–3 | 58 |
| 27 | December 6 | Linköpings HC | 1 – 0 | HV71 | OT | Liv | 7,038 | 18–5–4 | 59 |
| 28 | December 8 | HV71 | 0 – 4 | Skellefteå AIK | | Liv | 5,051 | 18–6–4 | 59 |
| 29 | December 18 | Brynäs IF | 3 – 2 | HV71 | OT | Liv | 7,038 | 18–6–5 | 60 |
| 30 | December 20 | HV71 | 4 – 2 | Timrå IK | | Liv | 5,112 | 19–6–5 | 63 |
| 31 | December 28 | Djurgårdens IF | 5 – 4 | HV71 | | Liv | 7,038 | 19–7–5 | 63 |
| 32 | December 30 | HV71 | 2 – 1 | Luleå HF | | Liv | 4,637 | 20–7–5 | 66 |

January: 5–2–3 (Home: 4–1–0; Road: 1–1–3)
| # | Date | Visitor | Score | Home | OT | Decision | Attendance | Record | Pts | Recap |
| 33 | January 3 | Modo Hockey | 3 – 2 | HV71 | | Liv | 7,038 | 20–8–5 | 66 |
| 34 | January 5 | HV71 | 2 – 3 | Frölunda HC | OT | Liv | 12,044 | 20–8–6 | 67 |
| 35 | January 8 | Mora IK | 1 – 3 | HV71 | | Andersson | 6,876 | 21–8–6 | 70 |
| 36 | January 12 | HV71 | 1 – 4 | Färjestads BK | | Liv | 8,250 | 21–9–6 | 70 |
| 37 | January 15 | Södertälje SK | 1 – 3 | HV71 | | Liv | 7,038 | 22–9–6 | 73 |
| 38 | January 17 | HV71 | 1 – 1 | Linköpings HC | OT | Liv | 8,239 | 22–9–7 | 74 |
| 39 | January 19 | Skellefteå AIK | 2 – 3 | HV71 | | Liv | 7,038 | 23–9–7 | 77 |
| 40 | January 24 | HV71 | 5 – 2 | Brynäs IF | | Liv | 4,899 | 24–9–7 | 80 |
| 41 | January 26 | Timrå IK | 2 – 6 | HV71 | | Liv | 7,038 | 25–9–7 | 83 |
| 42 | January 28 | HV71 | 2 – 2 | Djurgårdens IF | OT | Liv | 7,084 | 25–9–8 | 84 |
| 43 | January 31 | Luleå HF | 4 – 5 | HV71 | OT | Liv | 6,983 | 25–9–9 | 86 |

February: 5–2–1 (Home: 2–1–1; Road: 3–1–0)
| # | Date | Visitor | Score | Home | OT | Decision | Attendance | Record | Pts | Recap |
| 44 | February 2 | HV71 | 6 – 2 | Modo Hockey | | Liv | 7,600 | 26–9–9 | 89 |
| 49 | February 12 | HV71 | 4 – 0 | Linköpings HC | | Andersson | 8,083 | 27–9–9 | 92 |
| 45 | February 14 | HV71 | 0 – 4 | Mora IK | | Andersson | 3,311 | 27–10–9 | 92 |
| 46 | February 16 | Timrå IK | 3 – 0 | HV71 | | Liv | 7,038 | 27–11–9 | 92 |
| 47 | February 18 | HV71 | 2 – 0 | Brynäs IF | | Liv | 4,347 | 28–11–9 | 95 |
| 48 | February 21 | Luleå HF | 2 – 8 | HV71 | | Liv | 6,922 | 29–11–9 | 98 |
| 50 | February 26 | Färjestads BK | 0 – 3 | HV71 | | Liv | 7,038 | 30–11–9 | 101 |
| 51 | February 28 | Modo Hockey | 2 – 3 | HV71 | OT | Liv | 7,038 | 30–11–10 | 103 |

March: 1–2–1 (Home: 1–1–0; Road: 0–1–1)
| # | Date | Visitor | Score | Home | OT | Decision | Attendance | Record | Pts | Recap |
| 52 | March 1 | HV71 | 2 – 3 | Frölunda HC | OT | Liv | 7,038 | 30–11–11 | 104 |
| 53 | March 3 | Södertälje SK | 4 – 2 | HV71 | | Liv | 7,038 | 30–12–11 | 104 |
| 54 | March 6 | HV71 | 3 – 4 | Skellefteå AIK | | Liv | 7,038 | 30–13–11 | 104 |
| 55 | March 8 | Djurgårdens IF | 3 – 4 | HV71 | | Liv | 7,038 | 31–13–11 | 107 |

Legend: Win (3 points) Overtime win (2 point) Loss (0 points) Overtime loss (1 point) Tie (1 point)

== Playoffs ==
HV71 ended the 2007–08 regular season as the league winner and first seed. HV71 chose to meet the eighth seed, Skellefteå AIK, in the quarterfinals and defeated them in five games. HV71 played the fifth seed, Timrå IK, in the semifinals. Timrå was defeated in six games. In the finals HV71 defeated Linköpings HC, the second seed, in six games, winning the series with 4-2.

2008 Elitserien playoffs

Quarterfinals: vs. (8) Skellefteå AIK - HV71 win series 4–1
| # | Date | Visitor | Score | Home | OT | Decision | Attendance | Series | Recap |
| 1 | March 11 | HV71 | 1 – 2 | Skellefteå AIK | | Liv | 5,900 | Skellefteå AIK lead 1–0 |
| 2 | March 13 | Skellefteå AIK | 1 – 2 | HV71 | | Liv | 7,038 | Tied 1–1 |
| 3 | March 15 | HV71 | 7 – 1 | Skellefteå AIK | | Liv | 6,001 | HV71 lead 2–1 |
| 4 | March 17 | Skellefteå AIK | 0 – 2 | HV71 | | Liv | 7,038 | HV71 lead 3–1 |
| 5 | March 18 | Skellefteå AIK | 0 – 6 | HV71 | | Liv | 7,038 | HV71 win series, 4–1 |

Semifinals: vs. (5) Timrå IK - HV71 win series 4–2
| # | Date | Visitor | Score | Home | OT | Decision | Attendance | Series | Recap |
| 1 | March 24 | HV71 | 3 – 5 | Timrå IK | | Liv | 6,000 | Timrå IK lead 1–0 |
| 2 | March 26 | Timrå IK | 1 – 2 | HV71 | | Liv | 7,038 | Tied 1–1 |
| 3 | March 28 | HV71 | 2 – 3 | Timrå IK | | Liv | 6,000 | Timrå IK lead 2–1 |
| 4 | March 30 | Timrå IK | 0 – 4 | HV71 | | Liv | 7,038 | Tied 2–2 |
| 5 | March 31 | Timrå IK | 1 – 3 | HV71 | | Liv | 7,038 | HV71 lead 3–2 |
| 6 | April 3 | HV71 | 2 – 1 | Timrå IK | | Liv | 6,000 | HV71 win series, 4–2 |

Finals: vs. (2) Linköpings HC - HV71 win series 4–2
| # | Date | Visitor | Score | Home | OT | Decision | Attendance | Series | Recap |
| 1 | April 7 | HV71 | 4 – 6 | Linköpings HC | | Liv | 8,500 | Linköpings HC lead 1–0 |
| 2 | April 9 | Linköpings HC | 2 – 1 | HV71 | | Liv | 7,038 | Linköpings HC lead 2–0 |
| 3 | April 11 | HV71 | 4 – 3 | Linköpings HC | OT | Liv | 8,500 | Linköpings HC lead 2–1 |
| 4 | April 14 | Linköpings HC | 1 – 5 | HV71 | | Liv | 7,038 | Tied 2–2 |
| 5 | April 16 | Linköpings HC | 3 – 7 | HV71 | | Liv | 7,038 | HV71 lead 3–2 |
| 6 | April 18 | HV71 | 3 – 2 | Linköpings HC | OT | Liv | 8,500 | HV71 win series, 4–2 |

Legend: Win Overtime win Loss

== Player stats ==
=== Skaters ===
Note: GP = Games played; G = Goals; A = Assists; Pts = Points; +/- = Plus–minus; PIM = Penalties in Minutes

Regular season

| Player | GP | G | A | Pts | +/- | PIM |
|---|---|---|---|---|---|---|
| Jukka Voutilainen | 51 | 26 | 20 | 46 | 21 | 30 |
| Johan Davidsson | 47 | 9 | 34 | 43 | 18 | 18 |
| Jan Hrdina | 51 | 18 | 24 | 42 | 7 | 60 |
| Martin Thörnberg | 51 | 20 | 17 | 37 | 15 | 68 |
| Mikko Luoma | 49 | 10 | 25 | 35 | 7 | 58 |
| Per Ledin | 52 | 16 | 17 | 33 | 13 | 137 |
| Johan Åkerman | 45 | 9 | 24 | 35 | 1 | 38 |
| Pasi Puistola | 55 | 11 | 21 | 32 | 9 | 99 |
| Andreas Jämtin | 51 | 17 | 13 | 30 | 10 | 167 |
| Johan Lindström | 50 | 4 | 18 | 22 | -3 | 22 |

Playoffs

| Player | GP | G | A | Pts | +/- | PIM |
|---|---|---|---|---|---|---|
| Jukka Voutilainen | 17 | 9 | 12 | 21 | 9 | 12 |
| Johan Davidsson | 17 | 8 | 12 | 20 | 7 | 2 |
| Martin Thörnberg | 17 | 7 | 10 | 17 | 9 | 10 |
| Johan Åkerman | 17 | 3 | 13 | 16 | 6 | 8 |
| David Petrasek | 17 | 6 | 4 | 10 | 0 | 18 |
| Pasi Puistola | 17 | 1 | 8 | 9 | 6 | 14 |
| Jan Hrdina | 16 | 6 | 1 | 7 | -3 | 53 |
| Mikko Luoma | 17 | 2 | 5 | 7 | -1 | 20 |
| Per Ledin | 17 | 2 | 5 | 7 | -4 | 63 |
| Andreas Falk | 17 | 4 | 2 | 6 | 4 | 12 |

=== Goaltenders ===
Note: GP = Games played; TOI = Time on ice (minutes); W = Wins; L = Losses; T = Ties; OTW = Overtime Wins; OTL = Overtime Losses GA = Goals against; SO = Shutouts; Sv% = Save percentage; GAA = Goals against average

Regular season

| Player | GP | TOI | W | L | T | OTW | OTL | GA | SO | Sv% | GAA |
|---|---|---|---|---|---|---|---|---|---|---|---|
| Stefan Liv | 48 | 2785 | 26 | 11 | 11 | 3 | 3 | 105 | 5 | .91 | 2.26 |
| Andreas Andersson | 7 | 538 | 5 | 2 | 0 | 0 | 0 | 22 | 1 | .91 | 2.45 |

Playoffs

| Player | GP | TOI | W | L | T | OTW | OTL | GA | SO | Sv% | GAA |
|---|---|---|---|---|---|---|---|---|---|---|---|
| Stefan Liv | 17 | 1020 | 12 | 5 | 0 | 2 | 0 | 31 | 3 | .93 | 1.82 |
| Andreas Andersson | 0 | 0 | 0 | 0 | 0 | 0 | 0 | — | — | — | — |

== Transactions ==
Acquired by HV71
| Player | Former team | Contract Terms |
| Mika Niskanen | Timrå IK | 1 year |
| Andreas Andersson | Rögle BK | 2 years |
| Stefan Liv | Grand Rapids Griffins | 3 years |
| Jonas Johansson | Grand Rapids Griffins | 2 years |
| Björn Melin | Portland Pirates | 3 years |
| Nichlas Torp | HV71 youth | 2 years |
| Mikko Luoma | Linköpings HC | 2 years |
| Per Ledin | Färjestads BK | 2 years |
| Eric Johansson | Mora IK | 1 year |

Leaving HV71
| Player | New team |
| Erik Ersberg | Los Angeles Kings |
| Kimmo Kapanen | Ässät |
| Niklas Hjalmarsson | Luleå HF |
| Timo Vertala | Kärpät |
| Erik Andersson | Timrå IK |
| Magnus Åkerlund | Timrå IK |
| Pat Kavanagh | Iserlohn Roosters |
| Jaroslav Balastik | RI OKNA Zlín |
| Jens Svensson | Malmö Redhawks |
| Stefan Pettersson | Södertälje SK |

== Roster ==
| Goaltenders: 1 – Stefan Liv; 35 – Andreas Andersson | Defensemen: 4 – Johan Åkerman; 5 – Mikko Luoma; 7 – Per Gustafsson - A; 8 – Daniel Grillfors; 21 – Pasi Puistola; 22 – David Petrasek - A; 27 – Johan Halvardsson; 38 – Nichlas Torp; 47 – Lance Ward | Wingers: 10 – Martin Thörnberg; 11 – Johan Lindström; 16 – Jonas Johansson; 19 – David Fredriksson; 20 – Eric Johansson; 31 – Björn Melin; 39 – Jukka Voutilainen; 50 – Andreas Jämtin; 97 – Per Ledin | Centers: 17 – Andreas Falk; 24 – Jan Hrdina; 33 – Jari Kauppila; 76 – Johan Davidsson - C; GM: Fredrik Stillman; Coach: Kent Johansson |

== Draft picks ==
HV71 players picked at the 2008 NHL entry draft in Ottawa, Ontario, Canada.

| Round | # | Player | Position | Picked by |
|---|---|---|---|---|
| 1 | 24 | Mattias Tedenby | LW | New Jersey Devils |
| 4 | 102 | David Ullström | C/LW | New York Islanders |
| 4 | 109 | André Petersson | LW | Ottawa Senators |
