= List of HV71 seasons =

This is a list of HV71 seasons through franchise history.

Note: GP = Games played; W = Wins; L = Losses; T/OT = Ties/Overtime; Pts = Points; GF = Goals for; GA = Goals against

| Season | GP | W | L | T/OT | Pts | GF | GA | Finish | Playoffs |
| 1971–72 | 18 | 6 | 10 | 2 | 14 | 82 | 101 | 7th, Division 2 | Did not qualify |
| 1972–73 | 18 | 8 | 7 | 3 | 19 | 85 | 72 | 4th, Division 2 | Did not qualify |
| 1973–74 | 18 | 17 | 0 | 1 | 35 | 115 | 39 | 1st, Division 2 | 3rd in Qualification for Division 1 |
| 1974–75 | 22 | 19 | 2 | 1 | 39 | 141 | 61 | 1st, Division 2 | 2nd in Qualification for Elitserien, Promoted to Division 1 |
| 1975–76 | 22 | 16 | 5 | 1 | 33 | 110 | 67 | 3rd, Division 1 | Lost Play Off 2 to Elitserien, 0–2 (Nacka SK) |
| 1976–77 | 33 | 24 | 7 | 2 | 50 | 224 | 101 | 1st, Division 1 | 3rd in Qualification for Elitserien |
| 1977–78 | 27 | 19 | 6 | 2 | 40 | 162 | 92 | 2nd, Division 1 | Lost Play Off 1 to Elitserien, 1–2 (Hammarby IF) |
| 1978–79 | 27 | 17 | 7 | 3 | 37 | 144 | 92 | 2nd, Division 1 | Kvalserien runners-up, Promoted to Elitserien |
| 1979–80 | 36 | 8 | 24 | 4 | 20 | 113 | 170 | 10th, Elitserien | Relegated to Division 1 |
| 1980–81 | 36 | 31 | 4 | 1 | 63 | 260 | 95 | 1st, Division 1 | 4th in Qualification for Elitserien |
| 1981–82 | 36 | 32 | 2 | 2 | 66 | 266 | 126 | 1st, Division 1 | 4th in Qualification for Elitserien |
| 1982–83 | 32 | 20 | 9 | 3 | 43 | 198 | 110 | 6th, Division 1 | 3rd in Qualification for Elitserien |
| 1983–84 | 32 | 18 | 9 | 5 | 41 | 167 | 111 | 3rd, Division 1 | 4th in Qualification for Elitserien |
| 1984–85 | 32 | 22 | 7 | 3 | 47 | 241 | 138 | 5th, Division 1 | Kvalserien winners, Promoted to Elitserien |
| 1985–86 | 36 | 16 | 14 | 6 | 38 | 128 | 118 | 3rd, Elitserien | Lost Semifinal, 0–2 (Södertälje SK) |
| 1986–87 | 36 | 16 | 15 | 5 | 37 | 103 | 115 | 5th, Elitserien | Did not qualify |
| 1987–88 | 40 | 17 | 18 | 5 | 39 | 149 | 166 | 7th, Elitserien | Lost Quarterfinal, 0–2 (IF Björklöven) |
| 1988–89 | 40 | 17 | 20 | 3 | 37 | 156 | 155 | 8th, Elitserien | Lost Quarterfinal, 1–2 (Leksands IF) |
| 1989–90 | 40 | 16 | 21 | 3 | 35 | 131 | 161 | 9th, Elitserien | Did not qualify |
| 1990–91 | 40 | 17 | 18 | 5 | 39 | 142 | 119 | 6th, Elitserien | Lost Quarterfinal, 2–3 (Västerås IK) |
| 1991–92 | 40 | 17 | 16 | 7 | 41 | 151 | 129 | 8th, Elitserien | Lost Quarterfinal, 1–2 (Färjestads BK) |
| 1992–93 | 40 | 13 | 19 | 8 | 34 | 123 | 149 | 9th, Elitserien | Did not qualify |
| 1993–94 | 40 | 15 | 18 | 7 | 37 | 111 | 118 | 9th, Elitserien | Did not qualify |
| 1994–95 | 40 | 12 | 19 | 9 | 33 | 117 | 143 | 8th, Elitserien | Swedish Champions, 3–2 (Brynäs IF) |
| 1995–96 | 40 | 18 | 14 | 8 | 44 | 156 | 131 | 4th, Elitserien | Lost Quarterfinal, 1–3 (Modo Hockey) |
| 1996–97 | 50 | 22 | 19 | 9 | 53 | 178 | 159 | 6th, Elitserien | Lost Quarterfinal, 2–3 (Färjestads BK) |
| 1997–98 | 46 | 19 | 19 | 8 | 46 | 127 | 145 | 7th, Elitserien | Lost Quarterfinal, 2–3 (Djurgårdens IF) |
| 1998–99 | 50 | 18 | 20 | 12 | 67 | 133 | 148 | 9th, Elitserien | Did not qualify |
| 1999–2000 | 50 | 18 | 19 | 13 | 75 | 144 | 131 | 8th, Elitserien | Lost Quarterfinal, 2–4 (Brynäs IF) |
| 2000–01 | 50 | 17 | 23 | 10 | 66 | 147 | 149 | 10th, Elitserien | Did not qualify |
| 2001–02 | 50 | 24 | 14 | 12 | 88 | 156 | 140 | 4th, Elitserien | Lost Semifinal, 0–3 (Färjestads BK) |
| 2002–03 | 50 | 21 | 16 | 13 | 79 | 143 | 142 | 6th, Elitserien | Lost Quarterfinal, 2–4 (Djurgårdens IF) |
| 2003–04 | 50 | 27 | 17 | 8 | 95 | 162 | 116 | 1st, Elitserien | Swedish Champions, 4–3 (Färjestads BK) |
| 2004–05^{1} | 50 | 17 | 31 | 2 | 57 | 123 | 163 | 10th, Elitserien | Did not qualify |
| 2005–06 | 50 | 29 | 10 | 11 | 102 | 164 | 107 | 1st, Elitserien | Lost Semifinal, 3–4 (Färjestads BK) |
| 2006–07 | 55 | 25 | 15 | 15 | 93 | 170 | 150 | 2nd, Elitserien | Lost Semifinal, 3–4 (Modo Hockey) |
| 2007–08 | 55 | 31 | 13 | 11 | 107 | 178 | 132 | 1st, Elitserien | Swedish Champions, 4–2 (Linköpings HC) |
| 2008–09 | 55 | 22 | 13 | 20 | 90 | 160 | 144 | 4th, Elitserien | Lost Final, 1–4 (Färjestads BK) |
| 2009–10 | 55 | 25 | 16 | 14 | 95 | 188 | 155 | 1st, Elitserien | Swedish Champions, 4–2 (Djurgårdens IF) |
| 2010–11 | 55 | 24 | 16 | 15 | 96 | 173 | 143 | 1st, Elitserien | Lost Quarterfinal, 0–4 (AIK) |
| 2011–12 | 55 | 22 | 16 | 17 | 92 | 151 | 130 | 3rd, Elitserien | Lost Quarterfinal, 2–4 (Färjestad BK) |
| 2012–13 | 55 | 27 | 16 | 12 | 102 | 155 | 124 | 4th, Elitserien | Lost Quarterfinal, 1–4 (Linköpings HC) |
| 2013–14 | 55 | 17 | 27 | 11 | 71 | 146 | 182 | 10th, SHL | Lost Quarterfinal, 1–4 (Skellefteå AIK) |
| 2014–15 | 55 | 25 | 19 | 11 | 92 | 145 | 141 | 5th, SHL | Lost Quarterfinal, 2–4 (Linköpings HC) |
| 2015–16 | 52 | 21 | 23 | 8 | 75 | 138 | 146 | 9th, SHL | Lost Quarterfinal, 0–4 (Skellefteå AIK) |
| 2016–17 | 52 | 27 | 14 | 11 | 98 | 152 | 99 | 2nd, SHL | Swedish Champions, 4–3 (Brynäs IF) |
| 2017–18 | 52 | 21 | 19 | 12 | 81 | 145 | 143 | 8th, SHL | Lost Eighth final, 0–2 (Linköpings HC) |
| 2018–19 | 52 | 24 | 21 | 7 | 80 | 136 | 125 | 8th, SHL | Lost Quarterfinal, 3–4 (Färjestad BK) |
| 2019–20 | 52 | 24 | 17 | 11 | 89 | 158 | 130 | 5th, SHL | Playoffs cancelled due to COVID-19 |
| 2020–21 | 52 | 12 | 30 | 10 | 51 | 127 | 167 | 14th, SHL | Lost Play out, 1–4 (Brynäs IF) Relegated to HockeyAllsvenskan |
| 2021–22 | 52 | 34 | 10 | 8 | 116 | 189 | 118 | 1st, HockeyAllsvenskan | Promoted to SHL, 4–2 (IF Björklöven) |
| 2022–23 | 52 | 15 | 21 | 16 | 68 | 138 | 151 | 11th, SHL | Did not qualify |
| 2023–24 | 52 | 13 | 30 | 9 | 53 | 130 | 175 | 13th, SHL | Won Play out, 4–3 (IK Oskarshamn) |
| 2024–25 | 52 | 13 | 27 | 12 | 57 | 127 | 164 | 14th, SHL | Won Play out, 4–2 (Modo Hockey) |
| 2025–26 | 52 | 15 | 27 | 10 | 59 | 136 | 172 | 13th, SHL | Won Play out, 4–0 (Leksands IF) |

^{1} NHL players in Elitserien due to the 2004–05 NHL lockout.
