= Fredrik Stillman =

- Born: August 22, 1966 (age 59) Jönköping, Sweden
- Height: 5 ft 8 in (173 cm)
- Weight: 170 lb (77 kg; 12 st 2 lb)
- Position: Defence
- Shot: Left
- Played for: HV71 (SEL); Berlin Capitals (DEL)
- National team: Sweden
- Playing career: 1985–2001

Medal record

Men's ice hockey

Representing Sweden

Olympic Games
Gold medal – first place	1994 Lillehammer	Team

World Championships
Silver medal – second place	1995 Stockholm and Gävle	Team
Bronze medal – third place	1994 Bolzano, Canazei, Milan	Team
Silver medal – second place	1993 Munich and Dortmund	Team
Gold medal – first place	1992 Prague and Bratislava	Team
Gold medal – first place	1991 Turku, Helsinki, Tampere	Team

Fredrik Jan-Ove Stillman (born August 22, 1966) is a Swedish former professional ice hockey player, currently general manager for HV71 in the Swedish elite league Elitserien.

== Playing career ==
Stillman, sometimes locally called "Mr. HV", played as a defender when active, until a shoulder injury, which he suffered in a training match against IF Troja-Ljungby in 2000, forced him to retire. He only played for one club, HV71, in the Swedish Elitserien during his career, although during two seasons, 1995–96 and 1999–00, he played in the German ice hockey league DEL with Berlin Capitals. He still holds HV71's club records of most career assists (197) and career points (287). On December 26, 2001, Stillman's jersey, no. 14, along with Stefan Örnskog's no. 15, were retired during a ceremony before a match against Frölunda HC in Kinnarps Arena.

== Managing career ==
After the 2000–01 season, Stillman retired from his active playing career and was appointed assistant manager to Pär Mårts in HV71. In March 2005, when HV71 signed Göran Sjöberg as assistant manager, Stillman was appointed general manager, a position which he held until 2014.

In 2008, Stillman won the Swedish Championship for the third time, as general manager of HV71. Previously he had won the championship as a player in 1995 and as a coach in 2004.

== Awards ==
- Gold medal at the World Championships in 1991 and 1992.
- Silver medal at the World Championships in 1993 and 1995.
- Named to the Swedish All-Star Team in 1993.
- Gold medal at the Winter Olympics in 1994.
- Bronze medal at the World Championships in 1994.
- Swedish Champion with HV71 in 1995.
- SHL Most Points by Defenseman (37) in 1996–1997.
- Swedish Champion with HV71 in 2004 as coach.
- Swedish Champion with HV71 in 2008 as general manager.

== Records ==
- HV71's franchise record for career assists (197).
- HV71's franchise record for career points (287).

== Career statistics ==
=== Regular season and playoffs ===
			Regular season					Playoffs
Season	Team	League	GP	G	A	Pts	PIM	GP	G	A	Pts	PIM
1982–83	HV71	SWE II	2	0	1	1	2	—	—	—	—	—
1983–84	HV71	SWE II	27	5	6	11	16	—	—	—	—	—
1984–85	HV71	SWE II	22	8	12	20	28	—	—	—	—	—
1985–86	HV71	SEL	32	5	8	13	6	—	—	—	—	—
1986–87	HV71	SEL	36	0	7	7	18	—	—	—	—	—
1987–88	HV71	SEL	35	6	5	11	26	2	0	0	0	2
1988–89	HV71	SEL	39	5	8	13	12	3	0	0	0	2
1989–90	HV71	SEL	40	6	9	15	24	—	—	—	—	—
1990–91	HV71	SEL	39	7	17	24	34	2	1	1	2	0
1991–92	HV71	SEL	39	8	11	19	38	3	1	2	3	4
1992–93	HV71	SEL	40	6	22	28	36	—	—	—	—	—
1993–94	HV71	SEL	39	8	12	20	34	—	—	—	—	—
1994–95	HV71	SEL	39	9	16	25	47	13	2	5	7	22
1995–96	Preussen Devils	DEL	50	8	21	29	22	11	2	5	7	2
1996–97	HV71	SEL	50	6	31	37	16	5	0	2	2	8
1997–98	HV71	SEL	45	5	13	18	22	5	1	2	3	6
1998–99	HV71	SEL	50	12	29	41	22	—	—	—	—	—
1999–2000	Berlin Capitals	DEL	56	4	16	20	22	7	0	2	2	6
2000–01	HV71	SEL	42	7	9	16	18	—	—	—	—	—
SEL totals			565	90	197	287	353	33	5	12	17	44
DEL totals			117	14	43	57	46	7	0	2	2	6

=== International ===
Year	Team	Event	GP	G	A	Pts	PIM
1983	Sweden	EJC	5	0	1	1	0
1984	Sweden	EJC	5	0	2	2	—
1986	Sweden	WJC	7	0	1	1	4
1991	Sweden	WC	6	1	2	3	0
1992	Sweden	OG	8	0	0	0	4
1992	Sweden	WC	8	1	1	2	2
1993	Sweden	WC	8	1	1	2	0
1994	Sweden	OG	8	3	2	5	2
1994	Sweden	WC	8	1	1	2	0
1995	Sweden	WC	8	2	1	3	4
Junior totals			17	0	4	4	4
Senior totals			54	9	8	17	12
