= Ulf Dahlén =

Swedish ice hockey player and coach

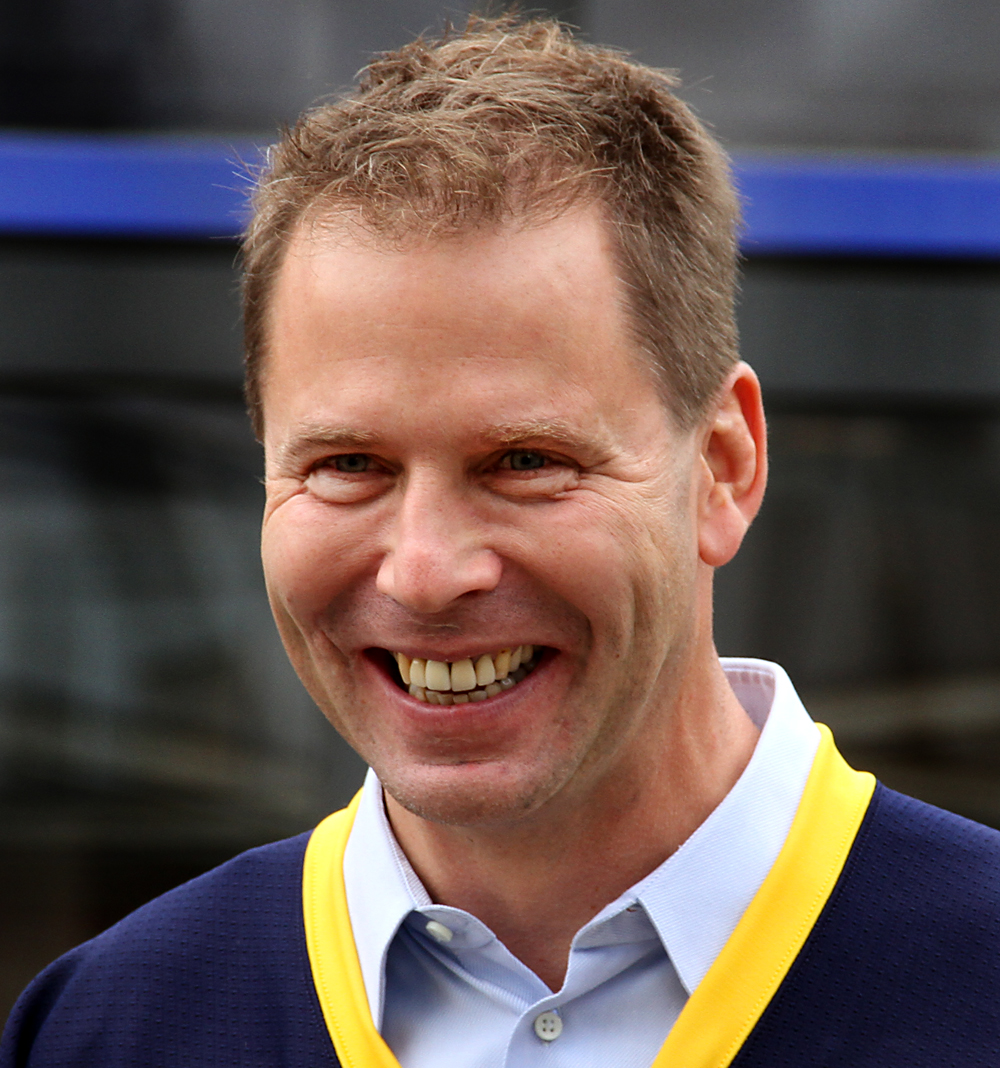
- Dahlén in September 2011
- Born: 21 January 1967 (age 59) Östersund, Sweden
- Height: 6 ft 2 in (188 cm)
- Weight: 199 lb (90 kg; 14 st 3 lb)
- Position: Left wing
- Shot: Left
- Played for: IF Björklöven; New York Rangers; Minnesota North Stars; Dallas Stars; San Jose Sharks; Chicago Blackhawks; HV71; Washington Capitals
- National team: Sweden
- NHL draft: 7th overall, 1985; New York Rangers
- Playing career: 1985–2003

Ulf Reinhold Dahlén (born 21 January 1967) is a Swedish former professional ice hockey player, and former head coach for HV71 and Frölunda HC in the Swedish Hockey League (SHL). His son Jonathan Dahlén was drafted 42nd overall in the 2016 NHL entry draft.

== Career ==
Dahlén was drafted seventh overall by the New York Rangers in the 1985 NHL entry draft. He played 966 career NHL games, scoring 301 goals, 354 assists and 655 points. During his active playing career, he played for 14 seasons, between 1987–88 and 2002–03, in the NHL for the New York Rangers, Minnesota North Stars, Dallas Stars, San Jose Sharks, Chicago Blackhawks and Washington Capitals. In the 1992–93 season, he recorded a total of six penalty minutes for the whole season, with 80 of his 83 games resulting in zero penalty minutes to make him the first player with eighty games of zero penalty minutes in a season. On 15 April 1993, Dahlén scored the final goal in Minnesota North Stars history in a 5–3 loss to the Detroit Red Wings; Russ Courtnall and Dave Gagner assisted on the goal.

After his playing career, he has served as an assistant coach for the Swedish national team and a pro scout for the Dallas Stars; and in June 2006, he was hired as an assistant coach by the Stars. Following the 2007–08 season, Dahlén left Dallas to take the head coaching position for Frölunda HC in Elitserien in Sweden. After three seasons with Frölunda, Dahlén signed as head coach for HV71, where he played for two seasons in the late 1990s.

== Accomplishments and awards ==
- Swedish Junior Player of the Year Award (1985)
- EJC-A All-Star Team (1985)
- Named Best Forward at EJC-A (1985)
- WJC-A All-Star Team (1987)
- Swedish World All-Star Team (1993)
- WC-A All-Star Team (1993)

== Career statistics ==
=== Regular season and playoffs ===
			Regular season					Playoffs
Season	Team	League	GP	G	A	Pts	PIM	GP	G	A	Pts	PIM
1983–84	Östersunds IK	SWE.2	36	15	11	26	10	—	—	—	—	—
1984–85	Östersunds IK	SWE.2	31	27	26	53	20	5	6	0	6	4
1985–86	IF Björklöven	SEL	22	4	3	7	8	—	—	—	—	—
1986–87	IF Björklöven	SEL	31	9	12	21	20	6	6	2	8	4
1987–88	Colorado Rangers	IHL	2	2	2	4	0	—	—	—	—	—
1987–88	New York Rangers	NHL	70	29	23	52	26	—	—	—	—	—
1988–89	New York Rangers	NHL	56	24	19	43	50	4	0	0	0	0
1989–90	New York Rangers	NHL	63	18	18	36	30	—	—	—	—	—
1989–90	Minnesota North Stars	NHL	13	2	4	6	0	7	1	4	5	2
1990–91	Minnesota North Stars	NHL	66	21	18	39	6	15	2	6	8	4
1991–92	Minnesota North Stars	NHL	79	36	30	66	10	7	0	3	3	2
1992–93	Minnesota North Stars	NHL	83	35	39	74	6	—	—	—	—	—
1993–94	Dallas Stars	NHL	65	19	38	57	10	—	—	—	—	—
1993–94	San Jose Sharks	NHL	13	6	6	12	0	14	6	2	8	0
1994–95	San Jose Sharks	NHL	46	11	23	34	11	11	5	4	9	0
1995–96	San Jose Sharks	NHL	59	16	12	28	27	—	—	—	—	—
1996–97	San Jose Sharks	NHL	43	8	11	19	8	—	—	—	—	—
1996–97	Chicago Blackhawks	NHL	30	6	8	14	10	5	0	1	1	0
1997–98	HV71	SEL	29	9	22	31	16	5	1	3	4	12
1998–99	HV71	SEL	25	14	15	29	4	—	—	—	—	—
1999–00	Washington Capitals	NHL	75	15	23	38	8	5	0	1	1	2
2000–01	Washington Capitals	NHL	73	15	33	48	6	6	0	1	1	2
2001–02	Washington Capitals	NHL	69	23	29	52	8	—	—	—	—	—
2002–03	Dallas Stars	NHL	63	17	20	37	14	11	1	3	4	0
SEL totals			107	36	52	88	48	11	7	5	12	16
NHL totals			966	301	354	655	230	85	15	25	40	12

=== International ===
Medal record

Representing Sweden

Ice hockey

European Junior Championships
Gold medal – first place	1985 France	

World Junior Championships
Bronze medal – third place	1987 Czechoslovakia	

World Championships
Gold medal – first place	1998 Switzerland	
Silver medal – second place	1993 Germany	
Bronze medal – third place	2002 Sweden	

Year	Team	Event	GP	G	A	Pts	PIM
1985	Sweden	EJC	5	7	4	11	0
1986	Sweden	WJC	7	3	4	7	4
1987	Sweden	WJC	7	7	8	15	2
1989	Sweden	WC	10	2	2	4	4
1991	Sweden	CC	6	2	1	3	5
1993	Sweden	WC	6	5	2	7	0
1996	Sweden	WCH	4	1	1	2	0
1998	Sweden	OG	4	1	0	1	2
1998	Sweden	WC	10	3	3	6	0
2002	Sweden	OLY	4	1	2	3	0
2002	Sweden	WC	9	5	2	7	0
Junior totals			19	17	16	33	6
Senior totals			53	20	13	33	11

Preceded by Terry Carkner	New York Rangers first-round draft pick 1985	Succeeded by Brian Leetch
Preceded by Jörgen Jönsson	Golden Puck; 1998	Succeeded by Daniel Sedin, Henrik Sedin
