= Vätterstads IK =

Swedish ice hockey club (1967–1971)

- Full name: Vätterstads ishockeyklubb
- Sport: ice hockey
- Founded: 22 August 1967
- Folded: 24 May 1971
- Based in: Jönköping-Huskvarna, Sweden
- Arena: Rosenlundshallen

Vätterstads IK is a former Swedish ice hockey club from Jönköping. The club was formed in mid 1967 as a merger of IK Stefa and Vättersnäs IF. The club played its home games in Rosenlundshallen, which later was HV71's arena for a period. The club played in the Swedish second division in the seasons of 1967-1968 and 1968-1969

In 1971 the club was merged with Husqvarna IF's ice hockey section forming the still active HV71.
