= Stefan Örnskog =

Swedish ice hockey player (born 1969)

- Born: 4 April 1969 (age 57) Jönköping, Sweden
- Height: 5 ft 11 in (180 cm)
- Weight: 176 lb (80 kg; 12 st 8 lb)
- Position: Centre
- Shot: Left
- Played for: HV71 (SEL); JYP (SM-liiga)
- National team: Sweden
- Playing career: 1987–2001
Medal record
Men's ice hockey
Representing Sweden
Olympic Games
Gold medal – first place	1994 Lillehammer	Team competition
World Championships
Silver medal – second place	1995 Sweden	Team competition
Bronze medal – third place	1994 Italy	Team competition

Stefan Bror Karl Örnskog (born 4 April 1969) is a Swedish ice hockey player whose professional career as a left wing/centre lasted from 1987 to 2001 and was capped with a gold medal at the Lillehammer 1994 Winter Olympics in neighboring Norway, as well as with a silver and a bronze medal at the World Championships.

== Playing career ==
A native of Jönköping, the capital of Jönköping County in southern Sweden's Småland province, Örnskog enjoyed a 14-season career, playing 12 of them for his home town club HV71 in the country's top elite league, Elitserien. The 1994–95 season and part of the 1999–2000 season was spent in Finland playing for JYP in the SM-liiga. On 26 December 2001, Örnskogs's jersey, no. 15, along with Fredrik Stillman's no. 14, was retired during a ceremony before a match against Frölunda HC in Kinnarps Arena.

== Awards ==
- Gold medal at the Winter Olympics in 1994.
- Bronze medal at the World Championships in 1994.
- Silver medal at the World Championships in 1995.
- Elitserien champion with HV71 in 1995.

== Career statistics ==
=== Regular season and playoffs ===
			Regular season					Playoffs
Season	Team	League	GP	G	A	Pts	PIM	GP	G	A	Pts	PIM
1987–88	HV71	SEL	13	1	2	3	0	2	0	0	0	0
1988–89	HV71	SEL	19	1	6	7	2	3	0	0	0	0
1989–90	HV71	SEL	39	12	15	27	8	—	—	—	—	—
1990–91	HV71	SEL	39	15	9	24	10	2	1	1	2	0
1991–92	HV71	SEL	40	12	15	27	10	3	1	0	1	2
1992–93	HV71	SEL	36	8	15	23	20	—	—	—	—	—
1993–94	HV71	SEL	38	15	16	31	28	—	—	—	—	—
1994–95	HV71	SEL	32	5	11	16	6	13	4	8	12	4
1995–96	HV71	SEL	32	5	9	14	8	—	—	—	—	—
1996–97	HV71	SEL	45	14	27	41	20	5	2	1	3	0
1997–98	HV71	SEL	43	9	10	19	16	5	0	4	4	6
1998–99	JYP	SM-l	32	5	11	16	8	—	—	—	—	—
1999–2000	JYP	SM-l	17	4	5	9	0	—	—	—	—	—
1999–2000	HV71	SEL	25	2	9	11	8	3	1	0	1	2
2000–01	HV71	SEL	41	7	6	13	16	—	—	—	—	—
SEL totals			442	106	150	256	152	36	9	14	23	14
SM-l totals			49	9	16	25	8	—	—	—	—	—

=== International ===
Year	Team	Event	GP	G	A	Pts	PIM
1989	Sweden	WJC	7	2	1	3	0
1994	Sweden	OG	8	2	0	2	2
1994	Sweden	WC	8	1	2	3	2
1995	Sweden	WC	8	1	3	4	2
Senior totals			24	4	5	9	6
