= Thomas Ljungbergh =

Swedish ice hockey player (born 1963)

- Born: February 19, 1963 (age 63) Sweden
- Height: 6 ft 0 in (183 cm)
- Weight: 183 lb (83 kg; 13 st 1 lb)
- Position: Winger
- Shot: Left
- Played for: HV71; Södertälje SK; Nittorps IK
- NHL draft: Undrafted
- Playing career: 1981–1996

Thomas Ljungbergh (born February 19, 1963) is a Swedish former ice hockey player. He played for HV71 and Södertälje SK of the Swedish Hockey League during his career. Ljungbergh currently serves as an assistant coach for HV71 of the Swedish Hockey League, a position he has held since the 2007–08 season.

== Playing career ==
Ljungbergh began his career with HV71 in the Swedish Division 1 during the 1981–82 season. He was a member of the team when they were promoted to the Swedish Hockey League (then known as the Elitserien) for the 1985–86 season. After two seasons spent with HV71 in the Elitserien (and six total), Ljungbergh joined Södertälje SK, also of the Elitserien. Following a three-year stint with Södertälje, Ljungbergh rejoined HV71, whom he played for through the 1994–95 season; one which saw the team defeat Brynäs IF to win the Elitserien championship. His final season was 1995–96, which he spent with Nittorps IK of the Swedish Division 2.

=== International ===
Ljungbergh played for the Sweden men's national junior ice hockey team at the 1984 World Junior Ice Hockey Championships. He recorded one assist in seven games played, as Sweden claimed fifth place at the tournament.
