= Mika Niskanen =

Finnish ice hockey player

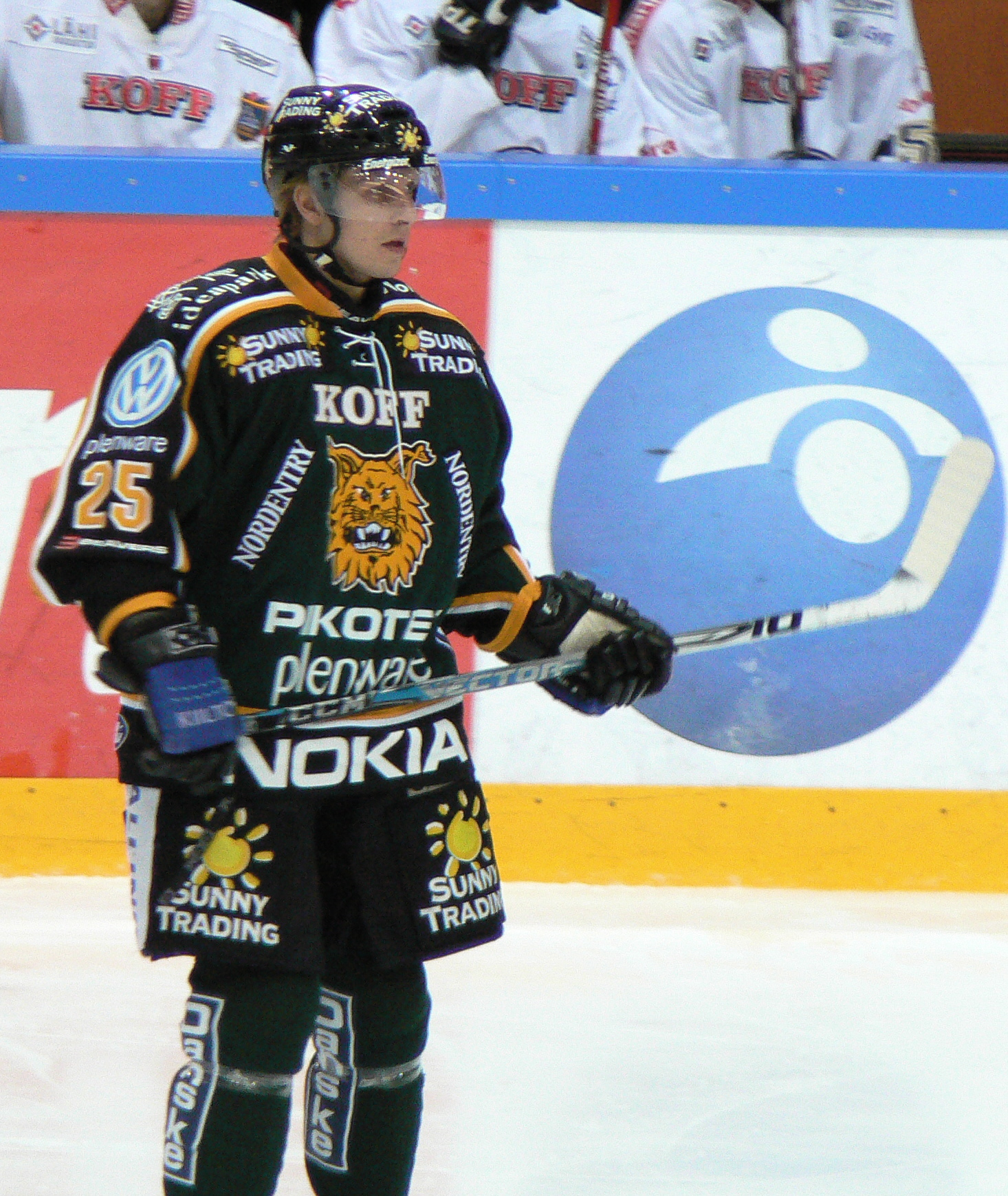
- Born: 24 July 1973 (age 51); Helsinki, Finland
- Height: 6 ft 0 in (183 cm)
- Weight: 194 lb (88 kg; 13 st 12 lb)
- Position: Defenceman
- Shot: Left
- Played for: KalPa; Lahti Pelicans; HV71; Espoo Blues; HIFK; Timrå IK
- Playing career: 1994–2008

Mika Niskanen (born 24 July 1973) is a Finnish former professional ice hockey defenceman.

== Career statistics ==
			Regular season					Playoffs
Season	Team	League	GP	G	A	Pts	PIM	GP	G	A	Pts	PIM
1990–91	VHT U20	Jr. A SM-sarja	15	0	1	1	10	—	—	—	—	—
1991–92	VHT U20	U20 I-divisioona	23	5	4	9	38	—	—	—	—	—
1992–93	Jokerit U20	U20 I-divisioona	14	8	8	16	30	12	2	0	2	20
1993–94	Jokerit U20	U20 I-divisioona	22	6	5	11	56	—	—	—	—	—
1994–95	Haukat	I-Divisioona	45	6	8	14	42	3	0	1	1	6
1995–96	Haukat	I-Divisioona	44	11	11	22	44	3	1	0	1	4
1996–97	Haukat	I-Divisioona	44	6	14	20	60	—	—	—	—	—
1997–98	KalPa	SM-liiga	46	3	3	6	18	—	—	—	—	—
1998–99	Lahti Pelicans	I-Divisioona	45	14	18	32	69	9	1	1	2	2
1999–00	Lahti Pelicans	SM-liiga	51	6	3	9	46	—	—	—	—	—
2000–01	Lahti Pelicans	SM-liiga	54	10	6	16	38	3	0	0	0	0
2001–02	Lahti Pelicans	SM-liiga	52	10	9	19	52	4	1	1	2	0
2002–03	HV71	Elitserien	45	3	7	10	50	7	0	1	1	8
2003–04	HV71	Elitserien	50	7	8	15	57	19	5	1	6	22
2004–05	Espoo Blues	SM-liiga	38	3	5	8	48	—	—	—	—	—
2004–05	HV71	Elitserien	8	0	0	0	8	—	—	—	—	—
2005–06	HV71	Elitserien	31	1	3	4	26	—	—	—	—	—
2006–07	HIFK	SM-liiga	29	1	1	2	40	—	—	—	—	—
2006–07	Timrå IK	Elitserien	13	3	2	5	14	7	0	2	2	8
2007–08	HV71	Elitserien	17	1	1	2	6	—	—	—	—	—
2007–08	Ilves	SM-liiga	9	0	1	1	12	—	—	—	—	—
2007–08	Örebro HK	Division 1	7	2	2	4	8	5	0	3	3	10
SM-liiga totals			279	33	28	61	254	22	1	2	3	6
Elitserien totals			164	15	21	36	161	33	5	4	9	38

== Awards ==
- Elitserien playoff winner with HV71 in 2004.
