= Rosenlundshallen =

Former indoor ice hockey rink in Jönköping, Sweden

Coordinates: 57°47′13″N 14°13′57″E

- Ispalatset (The Ice Palace)
- Interactive map of Rosenlundshallen
- Location: Jönköping; Sweden
- Owner: Jönköping Municipality
- Capacity: Ice hockey: 4,500

Construction
- Opened: 11 December 1958
- Closed: March 2000

Tenant
- HV71 (Elitserien) (1971-2000)

Rosenlundshallen was Sweden's second ice hockey arena and was located in Jönköping.

The arena was HV71's home arena until 2000 when it was replaced by Husqvarna Garden. It opened in 1958 and held 4,500 people during sport events.
