= Andreas Jämtin =

Swedish ice hockey player (born 1983)

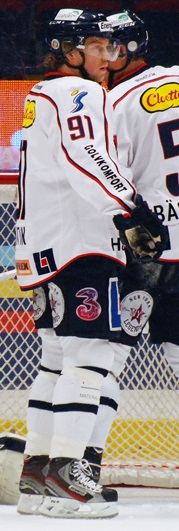
- Born: May 4, 1983 (age 43) Danderyd, Sweden
- Height: 6 ft 0 in (183 cm)
- Weight: 194 lb (88 kg; 13 st 12 lb)
- Position: Left/Right Wing
- Shot: Left
- KHL team Former teams: KHL Medveščak Zagreb; Färjestads BK; AIK; HV71; TPS; Hartford Wolf Pack; Linköpings HC
- National team: Sweden
- NHL draft: 157th overall, 2001; Detroit Red Wings
- Playing career: 2000–2018

Andreas Jämtin (born May 4, 1983) is a Swedish professional ice hockey player.

== Playing career ==
Jämtin is a winger who, despite his size, is very aggressive and plays with lot of intensity. Detroit Red Wings' assistant general manager Jim Nill commented on Jämtin's playing style as "he's a pest on the ice".

Jämtin was drafted in the 2001 NHL entry draft by the Detroit Red Wings with their 5th round pick, in the 157th overall selection. For season 2006–07 Jämtin waited for contract offers from NHL but due to not receiving any offers signed a one-year contract with the Swedish club HV71. After the 2006–07 season, he extended the contract with another three years. On 16 June 2008 it was reported that Jämtin signed with the New York Rangers as a free agent. After only having played four games in the AHL with Hartford Wolf Pack and five games with Charlotte Checkers in the ECHL, Jämtin chose to move back to Sweden and signed a two-year deal with the Swedish Elitserien team Linköpings HC.

== Career statistics ==
=== Regular season and playoffs ===
			Regular season					Playoffs
Season	Team	League	GP	G	A	Pts	PIM	GP	G	A	Pts	PIM
1999–2000	Färjestad BK	J20	28	6	6	12	36	—	—	—	—	—
2000–01	Färjestad BK	J18 Allsv	1	1	0	1	2	—	—	—	—	—
2000–01	Färjestad BK	J20	13	5	8	13	83	—	—	—	—	—
2000–01	Färjestad BK	SEL	1	0	0	0	0	—	—	—	—	—
2001–02	AIK	J20	12	12	15	27	61	1	2	2	4	2
2001–02	AIK	SEL	42	2	3	5	55	—	—	—	—	—
2002–03	AIK	Allsv	42	21	18	39	127	10	2	2	4	12
2003–04	HV71	SEL	39	5	13	18	105	16	3	3	6	68
2004–05	HV71	SEL	42	6	12	18	155	—	—	—	—	—
2005–06	TPS	SM-liiga	37	8	7	15	81	—	—	—	—	—
2005–06	HV71	SEL	8	1	1	2	28	12	3	2	5	28
2006–07	HV71	SEL	49	14	11	25	150	11	2	1	3	36
2007–08	HV71	SEL	51	17	13	30	167	17	1	5	6	36
2008–09	Hartford Wolf Pack	AHL	4	0	0	0	9	—	—	—	—	—
2008–09	Charlotte Checkers	ECHL	5	3	2	5	17	—	—	—	—	—
2008–09	Linköpings HC	SEL	27	3	7	10	86	7	1	1	2	8
2009–10	Linköpings HC	SEL	55	18	13	31	125	12	0	3	3	30
2010–11	Linköpings HC	SEL	37	9	14	23	158	5	2	0	2	12
2011–12	Linköpings HC	SEL	53	16	7	23	138	—	—	—	—	—
2012–13	Linköpings HC	SEL	14	3	4	7	26	—	—	—	—	—
2012–13	HV71	SEL	32	6	10	16	69	5	1	1	2	27
2013–14	HV71	SHL	25	5	7	12	107	6	1	0	1	2
2014–15	HV71	SHL	50	7	6	13	64	6	1	3	4	10
2015–16	KHL Medveščak Zagreb	KHL	55	6	4	10	85	—	—	—	—	—
2016–17	Färjestad BK	SHL	46	1	3	4	32	7	0	0	0	2
2017–18	Sheffield Steelers	EIHL	36	8	5	13	91	2	0	0	0	6
SHL totals			571	113	124	237	1465	104	15	19	34	259
KHL totals			55	6	4	10	85	—	—	—	—	—

Medal record

Men's Ice hockey

Representing Sweden

World Championships
Gold medal – first place	2013 Sweden/Finland	
Silver medal – second place	2011 Slovakia	

=== International ===
Year	Team	Event	Result	GP	G	A	Pts	PIM
2001	Sweden	WJC18	7th	6	3	4	7	26
2002	Sweden	WJC	6th	7	2	1	3	10
2003	Sweden	WJC	8th	6	1	4	5	10
2011	Sweden	WC	2nd place, silver medalist(s)	1	0	0	0	0
2013	Sweden	WC	1st place, gold medalist(s)	7	1	0	1	0
Junior totals				19	6	9	15	46
Senior totals				8	1	0	1	0

== Awards ==
- Winner of TV-pucken with Stockholm A in 1999.
- Swedish Champion with HV71 in 2004 and 2008.
