= Per Gustafsson =

Swedish ice hockey player (born 1970)

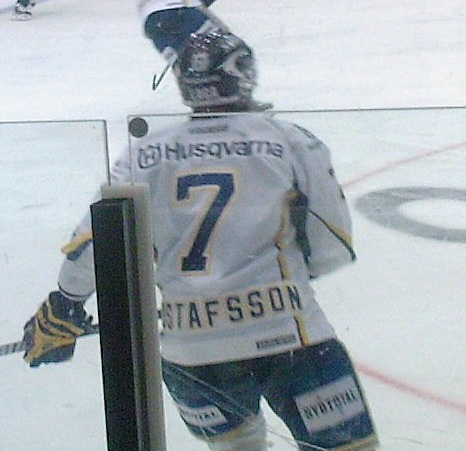
- Gustafsson with HV71 in 2009
- Born: June 4, 1970 (age 56) Oskarshamn, Sweden
- Height: 6 ft 2 in (188 cm)
- Weight: 198 lb (90 kg; 14 st 2 lb)
- Position: Defence
- Shot: Left
- Played for: HV71; Florida Panthers; Toronto Maple Leafs; Ottawa Senators
- National team: Sweden
- NHL draft: 261st overall, 1994; Florida Panthers
- Playing career: 1988–2010

Per Gustafsson
Medal record

Representing Sweden

Men's ice hockey

World Championships
Silver medal – second place	2003 Finland	Ice Hockey

Per Tage Gustafsson (born June 4, 1970) is a Swedish former professional ice hockey defenceman. He played over 700 games for HV71 in the Swedish Elitserien between 1988 and 2010, winning the championship three times. He also played 89 games in the National Hockey League (NHL) for Florida Panthers, Toronto Maple Leafs and Ottawa Senators, between 1996 and 1998. Internationally he played for the Swedish national team in several tournaments, including the 1996 and 2003 World Championships, winning a silver in the latter.

== Playing career ==
Gustafsson was drafted in the 1994 NHL entry draft by Florida Panthers with their 11th pick, 261st overall. He played two seasons, 1996–97 and 1997–98, in the NHL and American Hockey League (AHL). Playing for Florida Panthers, Toronto Maple Leafs and Ottawa Senators, he totalled 89 games for 35 points (8 goals and 27 assists).

He played for HV71 for 20 seasons and was one of the best defencemen in the club's history. He has the club record for most played regular season and playoff games.

In 1991–92 season Gustafsson scored a goal against Luleå HF just after six seconds, which as of 2008 was the Elitserien's record for fastest goal.

== International play ==
Gustafsson made his debut in the Swedish national team on April 12, 1992, in Moscow in a match against the Russian national team. He played for Sweden in the 1996 World Championships and 2003 World Championships, where he won a silver medal.

== Awards and achievements ==
- Swedish Champion with HV71 in 1995, 2004 and 2008.
- Named to the Swedish All-Star Team in 1996 and 2004.
- Silver medal at the 2003 World Championship.
- Played in the Elitserien All-Star Game in 2000 and 2001.
- Elitserien playoff silver medal with HV71 in 2009.

== Records ==
- HV71's club defenceman record for seasons (16)
- HV71's club defenceman record for played playoffs (10)
- HV71's club defenceman record for playoff games (72)
- HV71's club defenceman record for goals in playoffs (13)
- HV71's club defenceman record for assists in playoffs (25)
- HV71's club defenceman record for points in playoffs (38)
- HV71's club defenceman record for power play goals in playoffs (8)
- HV71's club defenceman record for goals in one game, 1991-92 (3)
- Elitserien record for fastest goal, 1991-92 (6 seconds)
- HV71's club defenceman record for goals in one playoff, 1994-95 (7)
- HV71's club defenceman record for points in one playoff, 1994-95 (12)
- HV71's club defenceman record for power play goals in one playoff, 1994-95 (5)
- HV71's club defenceman record for goals in regular season, 1998-99 (12)
- HV71's club defenceman record for power play goals in regular season, 1998-99 (7)

== Career statistics ==
=== Regular season and playoffs ===
			Regular season					Playoffs
Season	Team	League	GP	G	A	Pts	PIM	GP	G	A	Pts	PIM
1986–87	IK Oskarshamn	SWE-3	20	0	2	2	—	—	—	—	—	—
1987–88	IK Oskarshamn	SWE-3	36	7	13	20	—	—	—	—	—	—
1988–89	HV71	SEL	14	1	4	5	8	3	0	0	0	2
1989–90	HV71	SEL	27	4	3	7	16	—	—	—	—	—
1990–91	HV71	SEL	31	3	5	8	16	2	0	0	0	4
1991–92	HV71	SEL	39	9	7	16	22	3	0	0	0	0
1992–93	HV71	SEL	40	6	3	9	28	—	—	—	—	—
1993–94	HV71	SEL	34	9	7	16	10	—	—	—	—	—
1994–95	HV71	SEL	38	8	6	14	14	13	7	5	12	8
1995–96	HV71	SEL	34	8	13	21	12	4	3	1	4	2
1996–97	Florida Panthers	NHL	58	7	22	29	22	—	—	—	—	—
1997–98	St. John's Maple Leafs	AHL	25	7	18	25	10	—	—	—	—	—
1997–98	Toronto Maple Leafs	NHL	22	1	4	5	10	—	—	—	—	—
1997–98	Ottawa Senators	NHL	9	0	1	1	6	1	0	0	0	0
1998–99	HV71	SEL	50	12	16	28	52	—	—	—	—	—
1999–00	HV71	SEL	40	6	15	21	47	6	1	4	5	10
2000–01	HV71	SEL	48	18	27	46	—	—	—	—	—
2001–02	HV71	SEL	46	6	9	15	20	8	1	2	3	12
2002–03	HV71	SEL	15	2	6	8	6	7	0	3	3	0
2003–04	HV71	SEL	32	4	23	27	32	14	0	5	5	8
2004–05	HV71	SEL	46	9	15	24	44	—	—	—	—	—
2005–06	HV71	SEL	48	6	31	48	12	1	5	6	16
2006–07	HV71	SEL	52	7	18	25	56	14	4	3	7	20
2007–08	HV71	SEL	38	3	7	10	28	14	1	1	2	6
2008–09	HV71	SEL	49	9	18	27	42	15	0	2	2	16
2009–10	HV71	SEL	12	0	1	1	16	5	0	0	0	2
SEL totals			734	123	220	343	563	120	18	31	49	106
NHL totals			89	8	27	35	38	1	0	0	0	0

=== International ===
Year	Team	Event	GP	G	A	Pts	PIM
1996	Sweden	WC	6	2	2	4	2
2003	Sweden	WC	3	0	0	0	0
Senior totals			9	2	2	4	2
