= Andreas Andersson (ice hockey) =

Swedish ice hockey goaltender (born 1979)

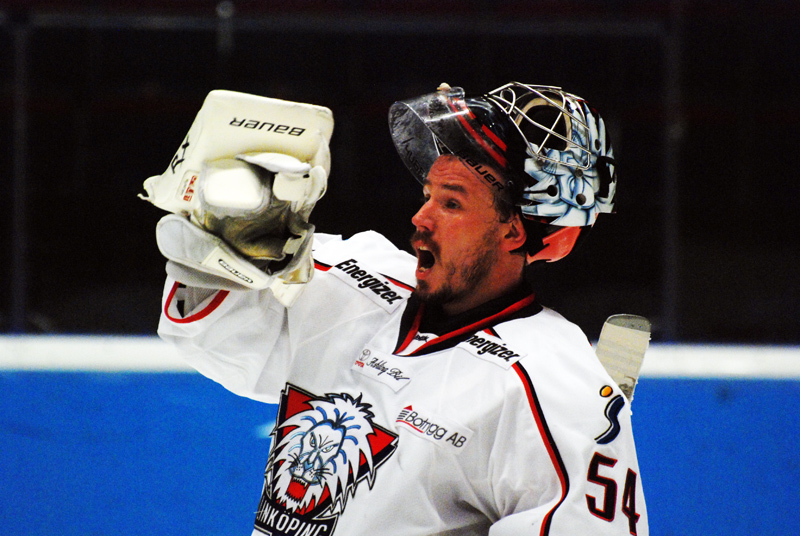
- Born: April 9, 1979 (age 46) Falun, Sweden
- Height: 6 ft 1 in (185 cm)
- Weight: 200 lb (91 kg; 14 st 4 lb)
- Position: Goaltender
- Caught: Left
- Played for: HV71; Linköpings HC
- NHL draft: 245th overall, 1998; Mighty Ducks of Anaheim
- Playing career: 1997–2015

Andreas Andersson (born April 9, 1979, in Falun, Sweden) is a Swedish former professional ice hockey goaltender.

== Playing career ==
Andersson was a long-time backup goaltender in HV71 and was never able to establish himself as a starting goalie for any team in Sweden. He started his career with Falu IF in division 1 but soon joined HV71's youth team. From 1996 to 2000 he played in 20 games for HV71's senior team and five games for the youth team. During the time he was also selected for the Swedish nation youth team and played in five games in the World Junior Championships.

From season 2000–01 to 2004–05 he played with IF Troja/Ljungby in the Swedish second tier division, HockeyAllsvenskan. He continued with two seasons with Rögle BK and in 2007 signed a two-year deal with HV71. In season 2007–08, on February 12, Andersson scored an empty net goal making him the sixth goaltender to score a goal in Elitserien.

== Awards ==
- Elitserien playoff winner with HV71 in 2008.
- Elitserien playoff silver medal with HV71 in 2009.

== Career statistics ==
=== Regular season ===
Season	Team	League	GP	W	L	T	MIN	GA	SO	GAA
1997–98	HV71	SEL	7				420	20	1	2.86
1998–99	HV71	SEL	12				634	35	0	3.31
1999–00	Tranås AIF	Swe-2	5				296	17	0	3.44
1999–00	HV71	SEL	1				51	5	0	5.91
2000–01	IF Troja/Ljungby	Swe-2	23				1307	82	2	3.76
2001–02	IF Troja/Ljungby	Swe-2	6				320	23	0	4.32
2002–03	IF Troja/Ljungby	Swe-2	9				419	20	0	2.86
2003–04	IF Troja/Ljungby	Swe-2	22				1122	60	2	3.21
2004–05	IF Troja/Ljungby	Swe-2	41				2454	120	0	2.93
2005–06	Rögle BK	Swe-2	18				1052	44	1	2.51
2006–07	Rögle BK	Swe-2	41				2388	85	2	2.14
2007–08	Rögle BK	Swe-2	3				177	12	0	4.06
2007–08	HV71	SEL	7	5	2	0	538	22	1	2.45
2008–09	HV71	SEL	19	6	3	10	1214	51	0	2.52
2008–09	IF Troja/Ljungby	Swe-2	2				130	5	0	2.31
2009–10	HV71	SEL	13				785	41	0	3.13
Swe-2 totals			170				9961	468	7	2.82
SEL totals			59				3642	174	2	2.87

Statistics as of end of Elitserien season 2009–10

=== Post-season ===
Season	Team	League	GP	W	L	T	MIN	GA	SO	GAA
2000–01	IF Troja/Ljungby	Swe-2	1				60	7	0	7.00
2005–06	Rögle BK	Swe-2	1				60	4	0	4.00
2006–07	Rögle BK	Swe-2	9				430	26	0	3.62
Swe-2 totals			11				550	37	0	4.03

Statistics as of end of Elitserien season 2008–09
