= Mikko Luoma =

Finnish ice hockey player

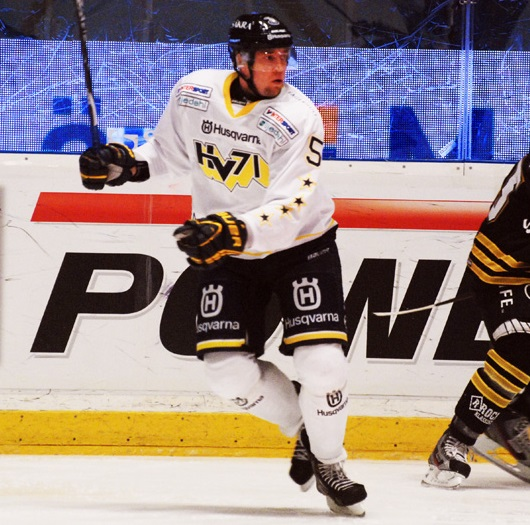
- Mikko Luoma playing for HV71 in October 2012
- Born: June 22, 1976 (age 50) Jyväskylä, Finland
- Height: 6 ft 4 in (193 cm)
- Weight: 209 lb (95 kg; 14 st 13 lb)
- Position: Defence
- Shot: Left
- Played for: JYP Jyväskylä; Tappara; Edmonton Oilers; Malmö Redhawks; Linköpings HC; HV71; Atlant Moscow Oblast; HC Bolzano
- National team: Finland
- NHL draft: 181st overall, 2002; Edmonton Oilers
- Playing career: 1998–2017

Mikko Luoma (born June 22, 1976) is a Finnish former professional ice hockey defenceman, who played 3 games in the National Hockey League with the Edmonton Oilers. He most notably played in the Liiga and Elitserien.

== Playing career ==
Luoma started his playing career with the Finnish JYP's youth team, playing for them from 1993 until 1998 when he stepped up to JYP's senior team in SM-liiga. In his first two seasons in SM-liiga he totalled 18 points over 104 games. From season 2000–01 to 2002–03, he played with Tappara, totalling 66 points in 164 games.

Luoma was selected by the Edmonton Oilers in the 6th round of the 2002 NHL entry draft, 181st overall, as an over-aged player. He only played one season in North America, largely in the American Hockey League with the Toronto Roadrunners, although he also saw some time with the Oilers.

After NHL and AHL, Luoma moved to Sweden and played in the Swedish elite league Elitserien with Malmö Redhawks in 2004–05 and Linköpings HC from season 2005–06 to 2006–07. For season 2007–08 he signed with HV71 and continued the season with winning the Swedish Championship.

He concluded his professional career after spending a single season in the Austrian Hockey League with Italian outfit, HC Bolzano in the 2016–17 season.

He is currently a European Amateur Scout for the Chicago Blackhawks of the NHL.

== Career statistics ==
=== Regular season and playoffs ===
			Regular season					Playoffs
Season	Team	League	GP	G	A	Pts	PIM	GP	G	A	Pts	PIM
1993–94	Diskos	FIN.2 U20	13	1	3	4	6	—	—	—	—	—
1994–95	Diskos	FIN.2 U20	23	8	17	25	34	—	—	—	—	—
1994–95	Diskos	FIN.3	7	1	2	3	2	—	—	—	—	—
1995–96	Diskos	FIN.2 U20	27	4	10	14	56	—	—	—	—	—
1995–96	Diskos	FIN.2	5	0	0	0	2	—	—	—	—	—
1996–97	Diskos	FIN.2 U20	4	2	2	4	4	—	—	—	—	—
1996–97	Diskos	FIN.3	34	15	52	67	34	3	0	2	2	6
1997–98	Diskos	FIN.2	44	2	18	20	60	5	1	0	1	10
1998–99	JYP	SM-l	53	2	8	10	60	3	0	0	0	4
1999–00	JYP	SM-l	51	2	6	8	58	—	—	—	—	—
2000–01	Tappara	SM-l	56	10	11	21	72	10	0	2	2	10
2001–02	Tappara	SM-l	56	11	18	29	76	10	1	2	3	10
2002–03	Tappara	SM-l	55	4	13	17	52	14	2	1	3	12
2003–04	Edmonton Oilers	NHL	3	0	1	1	0	—	—	—	—	—
2003–04	Toronto Roadrunners	AHL	65	4	22	26	54	3	1	0	1	8
2004–05	Malmö Redhawks	SEL	50	9	9	18	72	—	—	—	—	—
2005–06	Linköpings HC	SEL	50	7	19	26	105	13	2	1	3	20
2006–07	Linköpings HC	SEL	55	7	16	23	60	9	2	5	7	16
2007–08	HV71	SEL	49	10	25	35	58	17	2	5	7	20
2008–09	HV71	SEL	54	5	16	21	58	18	3	8	11	14
2009–10	Atlant Moscow Oblast	KHL	51	1	8	9	70	3	0	2	2	6
2010–11	HV71	SEL	33	3	19	22	70	4	0	1	1	0
2011–12	HV71	SEL	49	4	18	22	48	6	0	2	2	6
2012–13	HV71	SEL	47	1	7	8	50	5	0	0	0	0
2013–14	JYP	Liiga	52	4	11	15	48	6	0	3	3	2
2014–15	JYP	Liiga	60	8	25	33	60	12	3	4	7	10
2015–16	JYP	Liiga	56	4	15	19	34	13	0	6	6	12
2016–17	Modo Hockey	Allsv	8	1	0	1	16	—	—	—	—	—
2016–17	HC Bolzano	EBEL	14	1	2	3	6	9	0	1	1	10
Liiga totals			436	44	107	151	458	68	6	18	24	60
NHL totals			3	0	1	1	0	—	—	—	—	—
SEL totals			387	46	129	175	521	72	9	22	31	76

=== International ===
Medal record

Representing Finland

Ice hockey

World Championships
Bronze medal – third place	2006 Latvia	
Bronze medal – third place	2008 Canada	

Year	Team	Event	Result	GP	G	A	Pts	PIM
2006	Finland	WC	3rd place, bronze medalist(s)	9	0	2	2	6
2008	Finland	WC	3rd place, bronze medalist(s)	8	0	0	0	6
Senior totals				17	0	2	2	12

== Awards and honours ==
Award	Year
Liiga
Player of the Month (September)	2001
Champion (Tappara)	2003
SEL
Best P Plus–minus (+19)	2006
Salming Trophy	2008
All-Star Team	2008
Le Mat Trophy (HV71)	2008
