= 1982–83 Division 1 season (Swedish ice hockey) =

- League: Division 1
- Sport: Ice hockey
- Number of teams: 40
- Promoted to Division 1: Södertälje SK to Elitserien
- Relegated to Division 2: Kramfors-Alliansen; Fagersta AIK; Gävle GIK; IFK Bäcken

Division 1 seasons
- ← 1981–82 1983–84 →

1982–83 was the eighth season that Division 1 operated as the second tier of ice hockey in Sweden, below the top-flight Elitserien (now the SHL).

== Format ==
Division 1 was divided into four starting groups of 10 teams each. The top two teams in each group qualified for the Allsvenskan, while the remaining eight teams had to compete in a qualifying round in which the results carried over from the first round. The top two teams from each qualifying round qualified for the playoffs. The last team in each of the qualifying groups was relegated directly to Division 2, while the second-to-last-place team had to play in a relegation series.

Of the eight teams in the Allsvenskan, the top two teams qualified for the Allsvenskan final, with the winner being promoted directly to the Elitserien (now the SHL), while the loser qualified for the Kvalserien, which offered another opportunity to be promoted. The third to sixth ranked teams in the Allsvenskan qualified for the second round of the playoffs. The two playoff winners qualified for the Kvalserien, in which the first-place team qualified for the following Elitserien season.

== Regular season ==
=== Northern Group ===
==== First round ====
	Club	GP	W	T	L	GF	GA	Pts
1.	Timrå IK	18	17	1	0	139	36	35
2.	Luleå HF	18	15	0	3	103	53	30
3.	Piteå IF	18	11	1	6	109	77	23
4.	IFK Kiruna	18	9	1	8	95	96	19
5.	Järveds IF	18	8	1	9	77	98	17
6.	Kiruna AIF	18	7	2	9	71	85	16
7.	Bodens BK	18	7	0	11	70	105	14
8.	Tegs SK	18	4	1	13	60	92	9
9.	Kramfors-Alliansen	18	4	1	13	73	119	9
10.	CRIF	18	3	2	13	53	98	8

==== Qualification round ====
	Club	GP	W	T	L	GF	GA	Pts
1.	Piteå IF	32	21	1	10	219	134	43
2.	Kiruna AIF	32	17	5	10	145	135	39
3.	IFK Kiruna	32	15	2	15	166	170	32
4.	Bodens BK	32	13	2	17	147	188	28
5.	Tegs SK	32	10	4	18	138	157	24
6.	Järveds IF	32	11	2	19	126	186	24
7.	CRIF	32	8	3	21	108	175	19
8.	Kramfors-Alliansen	32	7	4	21	130	187	18

=== Western Group ===
==== First round ====
	Club	GP	W	T	L	GF	GA	Pts
1.	Mora IK	18	15	1	2	156	58	31
2.	Örebro IK	18	15	1	2	117	61	31
3.	Skövde IK	18	13	1	4	99	91	27
4.	Bofors IK	18	9	2	7	90	81	20
5.	IK Westmannia	18	10	0	8	101	94	20
6.	Surahammars IF	18	6	2	10	79	86	14
7.	Mariestads BoIS	18	5	2	11	64	91	12
8.	Malungs IF	18	5	2	11	59	98	12
9.	HC Dobel	18	4	1	13	74	124	9
10.	Fagersta AIK	18	2	0	16	83	118	4

==== Qualification round ====
	Club	GP	W	T	L	GF	GA	Pts
1.	Bofors IK	32	18	4	10	163	133	40
2.	Skövde IK	32	19	2	11	148	155	40
3.	IK Westmannia	32	17	2	13	168	145	36
4.	Mariestads BoIS	32	12	2	18	114	140	26
5.	Malungs IF	32	12	2	18	117	154	26
6.	HC Dobel	32	11	2	19	147	192	24
7.	Surahammars IF	32	8	3	21	133	169	19
8.	Fagersta AIK	32	9	1	22	133	189	19

=== Eastern Group ===
==== First round ====
	Club	GP	W	T	L	GF	GA	Pts
1.	Södertälje SK	18	13	4	1	115	56	30
2.	Västerås IK	18	12	2	4	86	50	26
3.	Väsby IK	18	11	1	6	91	81	23
4.	Huddinge IK	18	10	2	6	83	71	22
5.	Nacka HK	18	7	4	7	72	64	18
6.	Sundsvall/Tunadal	18	7	2	9	66	86	16
7.	Strömsbro IF	18	6	2	10	72	71	14
8.	IFK Lidingö	18	6	2	10	57	96	14
9.	Almtuna IS	18	4	4	10	58	73	12
10.	Gävle GIK	18	2	1	15	61	113	5

==== Qualification round ====
	Club	GP	W	T	L	GF	GA	Pts
1.	Huddinge IK	32	16	6	10	159	124	38
2.	Väsby IK	32	17	3	12	165	150	37
3.	IFK Lidingö	32	14	6	12	130	154	34
4.	Nacka HK	32	13	6	13	139	131	32
5.	Strömsbro IF	32	14	3	15	140	129	31
6.	Almtuna IS	32	12	7	13	126	123	31
7.	Sundsvall/Tunadal	32	9	3	20	123	176	21
8.	Gävle GIK	32	5	2	25	116	206	12

=== Southern Group ===
==== First round ====
	Club	GP	W	T	L	GF	GA	Pts
1.	HV71	18	14	3	1	141	61	31
2.	Tingsryds AIF	18	13	2	3	90	62	28
3.	Mörrums GoIS	18	10	3	5	100	72	23
4.	IK Vita Hästen	18	10	3	5	96	71	23
5.	IF Troja	18	10	1	7	86	70	21
6.	Rögle BK	18	7	2	9	72	78	16
7.	Karlskrona IK	18	5	2	11	78	111	12
8.	Malmö IF	18	4	2	12	54	94	10
9.	Nybro IF	18	4	2	12	49	92	10
10.	IFK Bäcken	18	3	0	15	51	106	6

==== Qualification round ====
	Club	GP	W	T	L	GF	GA	Pts
1.	Rögle BK	32	19	3	10	165	119	41
2.	Mörrums GoIS	32	17	5	10	180	141	39
3.	IF Troja	32	16	4	12	160	138	36
4.	IK Vita Hästen	32	16	3	15	136	119	35
5.	Karlskrona IK	32	10	3	19	141	184	23
6.	Malmö IF	32	9	3	20	107	172	21
7.	Nybro IF	32	8	3	21	108	162	19
8.	IFK Bäcken	32	8	3	21	107	177	19

== Allsvenskan ==
	Club	GP	W	T	L	GF	GA	Pts
1.	Södertälje SK	14	11	1	2	97	51	23
2.	Luleå HF	14	8	2	4	72	62	18
3.	Timrå IK	14	7	3	4	65	38	17
4.	Västerås IK	14	6	2	6	57	59	14
5.	Örebro IK	14	6	1	7	63	67	13
6.	HV71	14	6	0	8	57	49	12
7.	Mora IK	14	5	1	8	41	81	11
8.	Tingsryds AIF	14	1	2	11	39	84	4

=== Final ===
- Södertälje SK - Luleå HF 3:0 (7:3, 8:2, 5:2)

== Playoffs ==
=== First round ===
- Piteå IF - Skövde IK 2:0 (6:2, 10:2)
- Bofors IK - Kiruna AIF 1:2 (3:2, 1:7, 3:5)
- Huddinge IK - Mörrums GoIS 2:1 (7:3, 4:7, 6:3)
- IK Vita Hästen - Väsby IK 0:2 (4:7, 3:5)

=== Second round ===
- Timrå IK - Piteå IF 2:0 (4:3 OT, 7:1)
- Västerås IK - Huddinge IK 2:0 (3:2 OT, 7:6 OT)
- Örebro IK - Kiruna AIF 2:0 (13:0, 9:2)
- HV71 - Väsby IK 2:0 (8:6, 6:5 OT)

=== Third round ===
- Örebro IK - Timrå IK 1:2 (3:4, 5:1, 3:4)
- HV71 - Västerås IK 2:1 (11:2, 2:4, 4:0)
