= Pasi Puistola =

Finnish ice hockey player

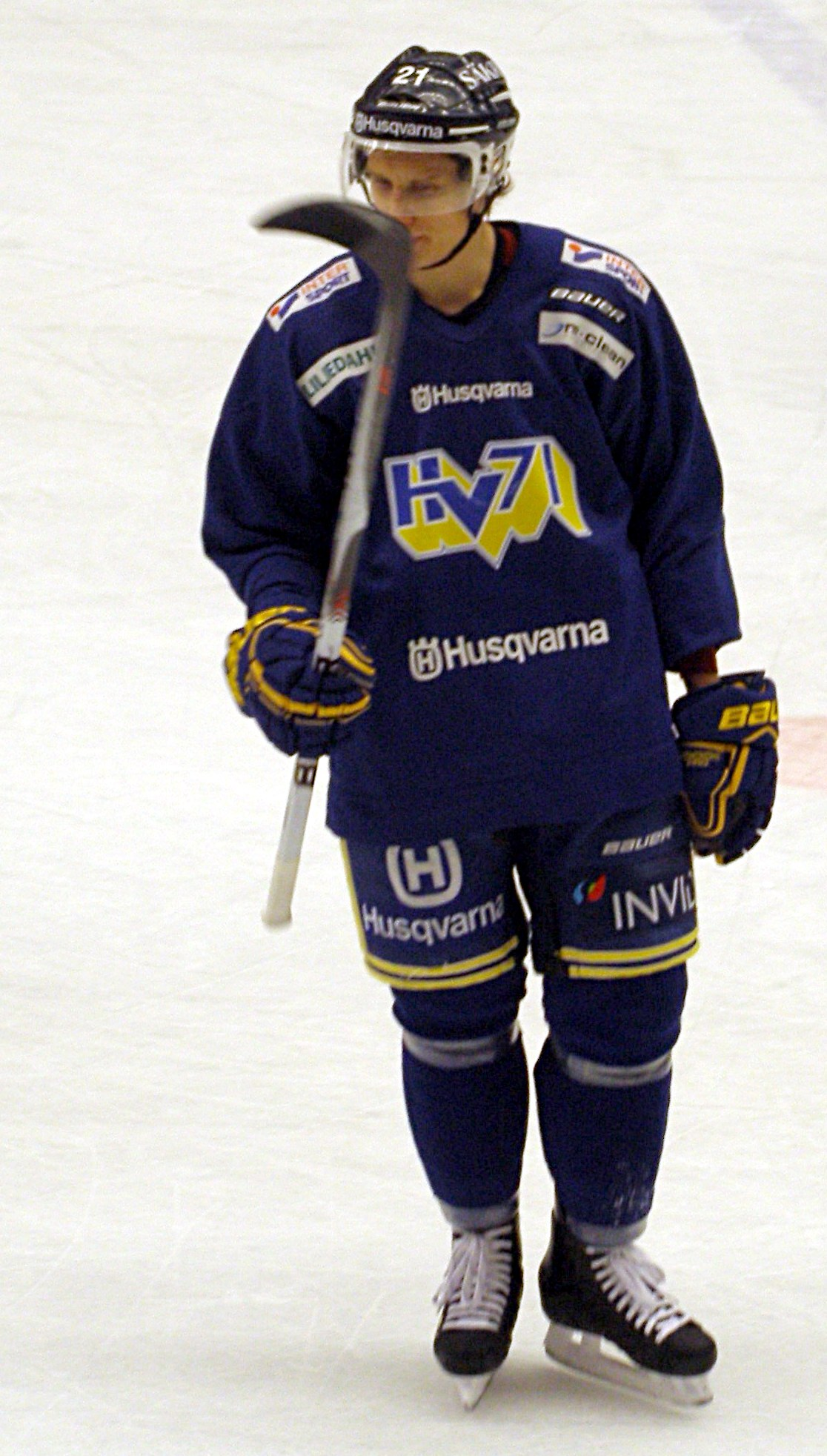
- Born: September 16, 1978 (age 48) Tampere, Finland
- Height: 5 ft 11 in (180 cm)
- Weight: 176 lb (80 kg; 12 st 8 lb)
- Position: Defence
- Shoots: Left
- SM-liiga team Former teams: Tappara; Ilves (SM-liiga); Ässät (SM-liiga); Tappara (SM-liiga); HV71 (Elitserien); Severstal Cherepovets (KHL); HC Donbass (KHL)
- National team: Finland
- Playing career: 1997–present

Pasi Puistola
Medal record

Representing Finland

Ice hockey

World Championships
Gold medal – first place	2011 Slovakia	

World Junior Championships
Gold medal – first place	1998 Finland	

Pasi Puistola (born September 16, 1978) is a Finnish professional ice hockey player.
