= Johan Åkerman =

Swedish ice hockey player

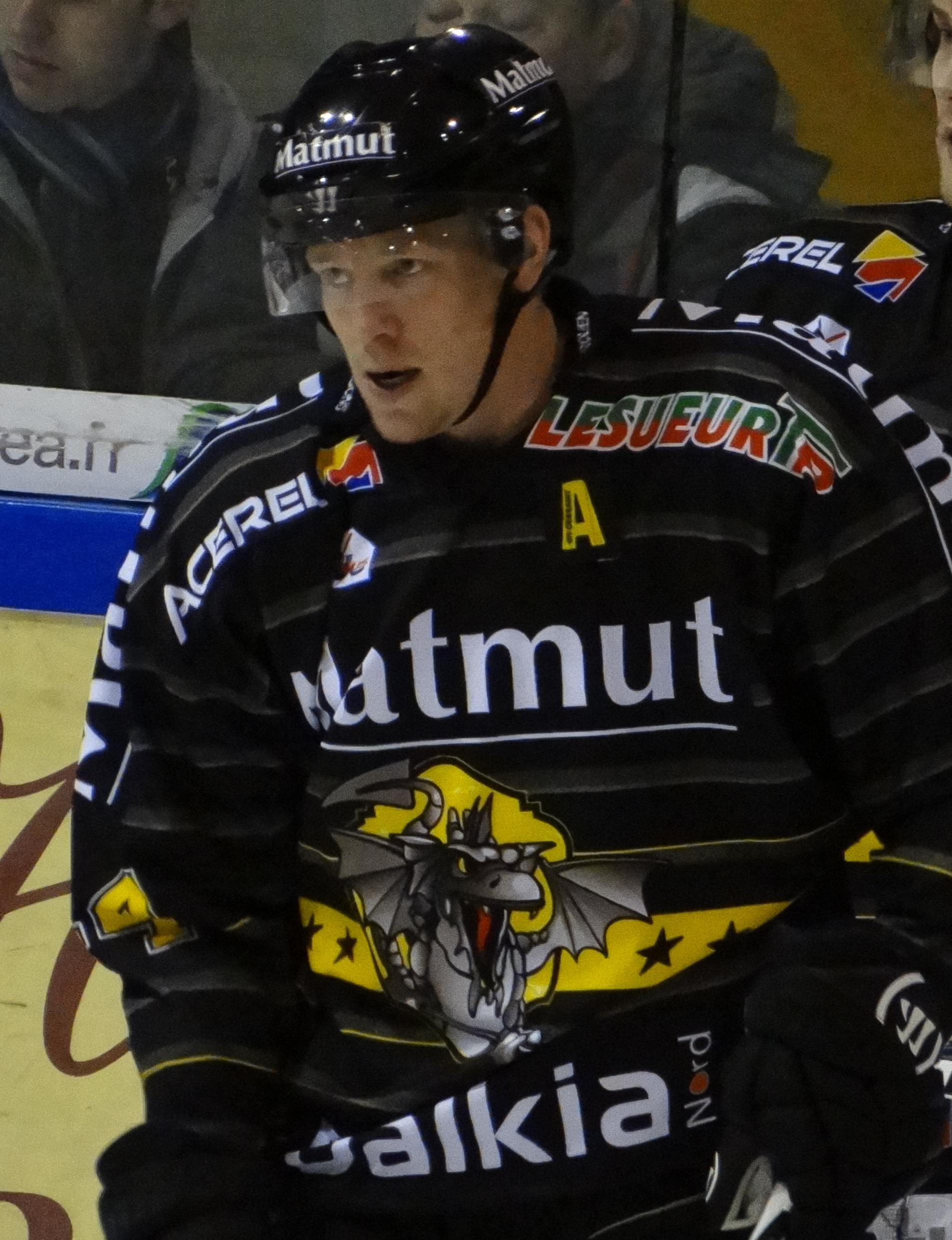
- Born: November 20, 1972 (age 53) Stockholm, Sweden
- Height: 5 ft 11 in (180 cm)
- Weight: 201 lb (91 kg; 14 st 5 lb)
- Position: Defence
- Shot: Right
- Played for: Linköpings HC; Kölner Haie; HC Lugano; Lokomotiv Yaroslavl; HV71; Skellefteå AIK; Vålerenga (GET); AIK
- NHL draft: Undrafted
- Playing career: 1994–2013

Johan Åkerman (born November 20, 1972) is a Swedish retired professional ice hockey player. He is currently a part of the coaching staff in the Linköpings HC organization.

== Career statistics ==
			Regular season					Playoffs
Season	Team	League	GP	G	A	Pts	PIM	GP	G	A	Pts	PIM
1991–92	Hammarby IF	Division 1	9	0	0	0	4	—	—	—	—	—
1992–93	Hammarby IF	Division 1	30	4	7	11	30	—	—	—	—	—
1993–94	Hammarby IF J20	Juniorallsvenskan	1	1	3	4	2	—	—	—	—	—
1993–94	Hammarby IF	Division 1	37	11	24	35	22	—	—	—	—	—
1994–95	AIK IF	Elitserien	38	1	3	4	8	—	—	—	—	—
1995–96	AIK IF	Elitserien	40	1	3	4	24	—	—	—	—	—
1995–96	IF Vallentuna BK	Division 1	1	0	0	0	2	—	—	—	—	—
1996–97	AIK IF J20	J20 SuperElit	3	1	1	2	—	—	—	—	—	—
1996–97	AIK IF	Elitserien	36	2	2	4	16	6	0	0	0	2
1997–98	Vålerenga Ishockey	Norway	40	16	36	52	38	—	—	—	—	—
1998–99	Vålerenga Ishockey	Norway	38	19	29	48	36	—	—	—	—	—
1999–00	Skellefteå AIK	Allsvenskan	41	9	32	41	48	—	—	—	—	—
2000–01	Skellefteå AIK	Allsvenskan	40	10	19	29	69	—	—	—	—	—
2001–02	Skellefteå AIK	Allsvenskan	45	12	28	40	50	—	—	—	—	—
2002–03	Skellefteå AIK	Allsvenskan	42	16	20	36	61	9	3	6	9	10
2003–04	Skellefteå AIK	Allsvenskan	46	15	38	53	54	10	1	2	3	6
2004–05	Skellefteå AIK	Allsvenskan	46	11	29	40	32	9	2	6	8	10
2005–06	Skellefteå AIK	HockeyAllsvenskan	40	15	46	61	52	10	0	9	9	12
2006–07	HV71	Elitserien	55	10	38	48	48	14	3	7	10	16
2007–08	HV71	Elitserien	45	9	24	33	38	17	3	13	16	8
2008–09	Lokomotiv Yaroslavl	KHL	47	2	10	12	24	11	3	5	8	6
2009–10	HC Lugano	NLA	36	3	18	21	67	3	0	0	0	2
2010–11	Kölner Haie	DEL	52	8	28	36	32	5	0	1	1	0
2011–12	Linköping HC	Elitserien	36	2	8	10	28	—	—	—	—	—
2011–12	Kölner Haie	DEL	16	2	11	13	39	6	0	2	2	0
2012–13	Dragons de Rouen	Ligue Magnus	16	3	15	18	18	13	4	4	8	8
Elitserien totals			250	25	78	103	162	37	6	20	26	26
KHL totals			47	2	10	12	24	11	3	5	8	6
Allsvenskan totals			260	73	166	239	314	28	6	14	20	26
Norway totals			78	35	65	100	74	—	—	—	—	—
DEL totals			68	10	39	49	71	11	0	3	3	0
