= Martin Thörnberg =

Swedish ice hockey player

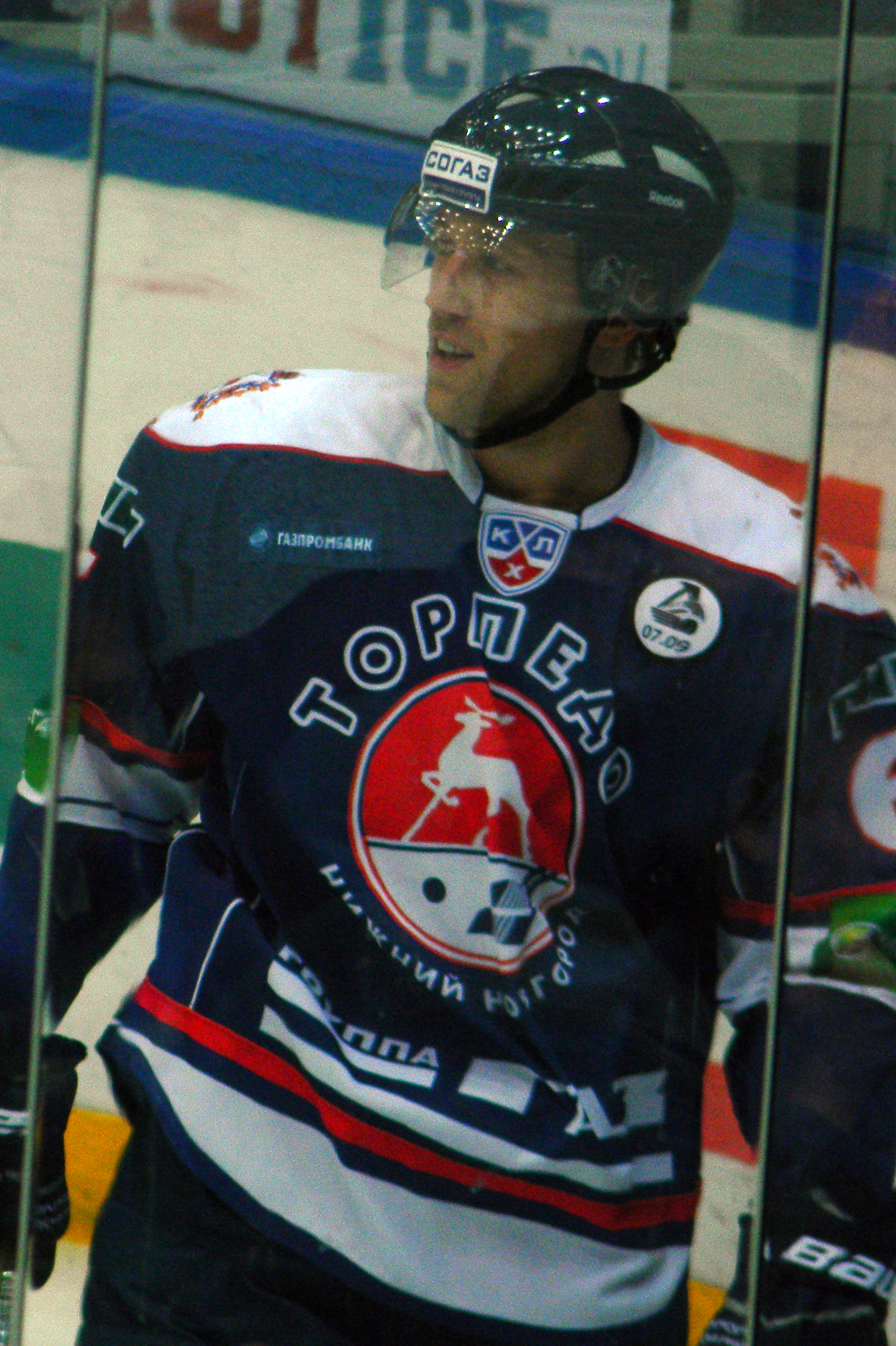
- Born: August 6, 1983 (age 41); Jönköping, Sweden
- Height: 6 ft 0 in (183 cm)
- Weight: 196 lb (89 kg; 14 st 0 lb)
- Position: Winger
- Shot: Left
- Played for: HV71; Torpedo Nizhny Novgorod; HC Lev Praha; Lokomotiv Yaroslavl
- National team: Sweden
- Playing career: 2003–2022

Medal record

Representing Sweden

Ice hockey

World Championships
Gold medal – first place	2013 Sweden/Finland	
Silver medal – second place	2011 Bratislava	
Bronze medal – third place	2009 Bern	

Martin Thörnberg (born August 6, 1983) is a Swedish former professional ice hockey player, formerly with HV71 of the Swedish Hockey League (SHL). He is the son of the retired ice hockey player Ove Thörnberg. He also played briefly in the Kontinental Hockey League with Lokomotiv and HC Lev Praha, joining Lokomotiv after Lev Praha announced they would not continue in the KHL due to financial bankruptcy, on July 2, 2014.

Thörnberg announced his retirement after the 2021–22 season, ending his career as HV71's sixth all-time leading scorer. It was later announced that Thörnberg's jersey number 10 would be retired by the franchise on 5 January 2023.

== Career statistics ==
			Regular season					Playoffs
Season	Team	League	GP	G	A	Pts	PIM	GP	G	A	Pts	PIM
1999–00	HV71 J18	J18 Allsvenskan	12	5	3	8	20	—	—	—	—	—
1999–00	HV71 J20	J20 SuperElit	13	1	0	1	4	1	0	0	0	0
2000–01	HV71 J18	J18 Allsvenskan	13	9	9	18	58	2	1	1	2	0
2000–01	HV71 J20	J20 SuperElit	8	2	1	3	4	—	—	—	—	—
2001–02	HV71 J20	J20 SuperElit	31	10	9	19	70	—	—	—	—	—
2001–02	HC Dalen	Division 1	—	—	—	—	—	—	—	—	—	—
2002–03	HV71 J20	J20 SuperElit	29	21	7	28	52	7	6	1	7	14
2002–03	HV71	Elitserien	12	0	0	0	2	—	—	—	—	—
2003–04	HV71 J20	J20 SuperElit	5	8	7	15	8	—	—	—	—	—
2003–04	HV71	Elitserien	47	7	4	11	71	17	0	0	0	4
2004–05	HV71 J20	J20 SuperElit	5	3	3	6	20	—	—	—	—	—
2004–05	HV71	Elitserien	28	2	0	2	18	—	—	—	—	—
2004–05	IK Oskarshamn	Allsvenskan	12	2	3	5	22	9	3	2	5	20
2005–06	HV71 J20	J20 SuperElit	2	3	4	7	0	—	—	—	—	—
2005–06	HV71	Elitserien	50	10	7	17	64	12	5	1	6	20
2006–07	HV71	Elitserien	55	14	12	26	34	14	3	2	5	4
2007–08	HV71	Elitserien	51	20	17	37	78	17	7	10	17	10
2008–09	HV71	Elitserien	51	27	11	38	88	18	10	3	13	29
2009–10	HV71	Elitserien	52	20	18	38	42	16	5	8	13	0
2010–11	HV71	Elitserien	52	25	19	44	24	4	1	0	1	6
2011–12	Torpedo Nizhny Novgorod	KHL	49	20	19	39	22	13	4	5	9	12
2012–13	Torpedo Nizhny Novgorod	KHL	52	26	12	38	34	—	—	—	—	—
2013–14	HC Lev Praha	KHL	53	18	13	31	34	22	7	6	13	12
2014–15	Lokomotiv Yaroslavl	KHL	56	11	20	31	39	6	3	0	3	2
2015–16	HV71	SHL	49	11	22	33	20	6	2	4	6	0
2016–17	HV71	SHL	47	17	10	27	14	14	6	5	11	2
2017–18	HV71	SHL	45	11	11	22	22	2	0	1	1	0
2018–19	HV71	SHL	10	1	4	5	4	6	1	0	1	6
2019–20	HV71	SHL	39	9	4	13	12	—	—	—	—	—
2020–21	HC Dalen	Hockeyettan	21	16	15	31	8	2	0	2	2	4
2021–22	HC Dalen	Hockeyettan	40	17	28	45	24	10	7	3	10	4
2021–22	HV71	HockeyAllsvenskan	4	0	0	0	6	—	—	—	—	—
KHL totals			210	75	64	139	129	41	14	11	25	26
Elitserien/SHL totals			588	174	139	313	493	126	40	34	74	81

== Awards and honors ==
Award	Year
SHL
Le Mat trophy (HV71)	2004, 2008, 2010, 2017
All-Star Team	2011
Gentleman of the Year	2017
