= 1983–84 Division 1 season (Swedish ice hockey) =

- League: Division 1
- Sport: Ice hockey
- Number of teams: 40
- Promoted to Division 1: Luleå HF; Hammarby IF to Elitserien
- Relegated to Division 2: Järveds IF; Ludvika HC; Almtuna IS; Karlskrona IK

Division 1 seasons
- ← 1982–83 1984–85 →

1983–84 was the ninth season that Division 1 operated as the second tier of ice hockey in Sweden, below the top-flight Elitserien (now the Swedish Hockey League).

== Format ==
Division 1 was divided into four starting groups of 10 teams each. The top two teams in each group qualified for the Allsvenskan, while the remaining eight teams had to compete in a qualifying round in which the results carried over from the first round. The top two teams from each qualifying round qualified for the playoffs. The last team in each of the qualifying groups was relegated directly to Division 2, while the second-to-last-place team had to play in a relegation series.

Of the eight teams in the Allsvenskan, the top two teams qualified for the Allsvenskan final, with the winner being promoted directly to the Elitserien (now the SHL), while the loser qualified for the Kvalserien, which offered another opportunity to be promoted. The third to sixth ranked teams in the Allsvenskan qualified for the second round of the playoffs. The two playoff winners qualified for the Kvalserien, in which the first-place team qualified for the following Elitserien season.

== Regular season ==
=== Northern Group ===
==== First round ====
	Club	GP	W	T	L	GF	GA	Pts
1.	Luleå HF	18	15	1	2	136	64	30
2.	Timrå IK	18	12	3	3	117	59	27
3.	Kiruna AIF	18	9	5	4	96	60	23
4.	Piteå IF	18	9	2	7	81	91	20
5.	CRIF	18	9	1	8	75	84	19
6.	Bodens BK	18	6	1	11	73	76	13
7.	Östersunds IK	18	5	3	10	58	72	13
8.	Tegs SK	18	6	1	11	71	96	13
9.	IFK Kiruna	18	5	1	12	47	97	11
10.	Järveds IF	18	4	2	12	59	114	10

==== Qualification round ====
	Club	GP	W	T	L	GF	GA	Pts
1.	Piteå IF	32	20	3	9	157	143	43
2.	Kiruna AIF	32	17	6	9	172	120	40
3.	CRIF	32	19	1	12	145	134	39
4.	Tegs SK	32	15	2	15	144	145	32
5.	Bodens BK	32	11	2	19	118	139	24
6.	Östersunds IK	32	9	4	19	113	135	22
7.	IFK Kiruna	32	9	2	21	84	165	20
8.	Järveds IF	32	6	2	24	123	195	14

=== Western Group ===
==== First round ====
	Club	GP	W	T	L	GF	GA	Pts
1.	Mora IK	18	13	1	4	133	54	27
2.	Falu IF	18	13	0	5	119	56	26
3.	Örebro IK	18	12	2	4	111	72	26
4.	Mariestads BoIS	18	11	2	5	98	65	24
5.	Skövde IK	18	11	0	7	86	85	22
6.	Bofors IK	18	7	1	10	75	105	15
7.	IK Westmannia	18	6	1	11	66	97	13
8.	Ludvika HC	18	5	1	12	75	130	11
9.	HC Dobel	18	4	2	12	68	106	10
10.	Malungs IF	18	3	0	15	59	120	6

==== Qualification round ====
	Club	GP	W	T	L	GF	GA	Pts
1.	Örebro IK	32	23	3	6	234	139	49
2.	Mariestads BoIS	32	20	3	9	209	130	43
3.	Skövde IK	32	18	0	14	165	172	36
4.	HC Dobel	32	11	3	18	152	183	25
5.	IK Westmannia	32	10	3	19	143	180	23
6.	Bofors IK	32	10	3	19	137	199	23
7.	Malungs IF	32	9	3	20	125	188	21
8.	Ludvika HC	32	8	3	21	126	242	19

=== Eastern Group ===
==== First round ====
	Club	GP	W	T	L	GF	GA	Pts
1.	Hammarby IF	18	14	2	2	115	46	30
2.	Huddinge IK	18	14	0	4	117	65	28
3.	Västerås IK	18	13	2	3	106	60	28
4.	Strömsbro/Gävle	18	11	2	5	87	70	24
5.	Väsby IK	18	7	2	9	74	79	16
6.	IK Vita Hästen	18	6	3	9	87	98	15
7.	Vallentuna BK	18	5	5	8	63	81	15
8.	Sundsvall/Tunadal	18	4	4	10	61	81	12
9.	Nacka HK	18	3	0	15	45	109	6
10.	Almtuna IS	18	3	0	15	50	116	6

==== Qualification round ====
	Club	GP	W	T	L	GF	GA	Pts
1.	Västerås IK	32	22	5	5	185	110	49
2.	Strömsbro/Gävle	32	19	5	8	162	111	43
3.	IK Vita Hästen	32	14	4	14	180	161	32
4.	Sundsvall/Tunadal	32	10	9	13	129	131	29
5.	Väsby IK	32	12	5	15	144	159	29
6.	Vallentuna BK	32	9	9	14	120	137	27
7.	Nacka HK	32	8	1	23	111	194	17
8.	Almtuna IS	32	3	2	27	85	213	8

=== Southern Group ===
==== First round ====
	Club	GP	W	T	L	GF	GA	Pts
1.	IF Troja	18	12	4	2	120	59	28
2.	HV71	18	11	4	3	102	56	26
3.	Rögle BK	18	10	2	6	89	64	22
4.	Tingsryds AIF	18	11	0	7	82	72	22
5.	Hanhals BK	18	7	5	6	84	90	19
6.	Mörrums GoIS	18	5	5	8	61	70	15
7.	KBA-67	18	5	5	8	51	75	15
8.	Nybro IF	18	5	4	9	59	68	14
9.	Malmö IF	18	4	2	12	58	107	10
10.	Karlskrona IK	18	4	1	13	60	105	9

==== Qualification round ====
	Club	GP	W	T	L	GF	GA	Pts
1.	Rögle BK	32	19	3	10	175	121	41
2.	Tingsryds AIF	32	17	2	13	175	144	36
3.	Nybro IF	32	14	4	14	137	120	32
4.	Hanhals BK	32	13	6	13	149	184	32
5.	Mörrums GoIS	32	11	6	15	127	140	28
6.	KBA-67	32	11	5	16	99	149	27
7.	Malmö IF	32	10	2	20	128	169	22
8.	Karlskrona IK	32	9	2	21	112	178	20

== Allsvenskan ==
	Club	GP	W	T	L	GF	GA	Pts
1.	Luleå HF	14	11	1	2	76	44	23
2.	Hammarby IF	14	7	2	5	68	49	16
3.	HV71	14	7	1	6	65	55	15
4.	Mora IK	14	6	2	6	54	59	14
5.	IF Troja	14	6	1	7	64	64	13
6.	Huddinge IK	14	5	1	8	56	77	11
7.	Falu IF	14	5	1	8	50	74	11
8.	Timrå IK	14	3	3	8	52	63	9

=== Final ===
- Luleå HF - Hammarby IF 3:0 (5:1, 7:6, 7:4)

== Playoffs ==
=== First round ===
- Piteå IF - Strömsbro/Gävle 2:0 (4:3, 6:5)
- Västerås IK - Kiruna AIF 2:0 (7:2, 11:1)
- Örebro IK - Tingsryds AIF 2:0 (9:1, 7:3)
- Rögle BK - Mariestads BoIS 0:2 (3:6, 2:6)

=== Second round ===
- HV71 - Piteå IF 2:0 (9:1, 6:3)
- Mora IK - Västerås IK 0:2 (0:4, 4:6)
- IF Troja - Örebro IK 2:0 (3:2, 7:6)
- Huddinge IK - Mariestads BoIS 1:2 (3:5, 6:4, 1:3)

=== Third round ===
- IF Troja - Västerås IK 0:2 (3:4, 1:3)
- Mariestads BoIS - HV71 0:2 (7:8, 3:4)
