= 1997–98 Elitserien season =

- League: Elitserien
- Sport: Ice hockey
- Duration: 16 September 1997 – 5 March 1998

Regular season
- League champion: Djurgårdens IF
- Season MVP: Ulf Dahlén (HV71)
- Top scorer: Ville Peltonen (Västra Frölunda HC)

Playoffs
- Finals champions: Färjestads BK
- Runners-up: Djurgårdens IF

SHL seasons
- ← 1996–97 1998–99 →

The 1997–98 Elitserien season was the 23rd season of the Elitserien, the top level of ice hockey in Sweden. 12 teams participated in the league, and Farjestads BK won the championship.

== Standings ==
	Club	GP	W	T	L	GF	GA	Pts
1.	Djurgårdens IF	46	27	6	13	148	110	60
2.	Färjestads BK	46	24	10	12	154	112	58
3.	Leksands IF	46	24	8	14	165	143	56
4.	Västra Frölunda	46	17	15	14	136	107	49
5.	Brynäs IF	46	21	6	19	138	131	48
6.	Modo Hockey	46	20	6	20	129	123	46
7.	HV 71 Jönköping	46	19	8	19	127	145	46
8	Luleå HF	46	15	13	18	112	125	43
9.	Malmö IF	46	17	8	21	134	121	42
10.	Västerås IK	46	15	9	22	102	146	39
11.	AIK	46	13	7	26	93	134	33
12.	Södertälje SK	46	10	12	24	110	151	32

== Playoffs ==
Quarterfinal
1	Djurgårdens IF	3
7	HV 71 Jönköping	2
3	Leksands IF	1
6	MODO Hockey	3
4	Västra Frölunda	3
5	Brynäs IF	0
2	Färjestads BK	3
8	Luleå HF	0

Semifinal
1	Djurgårdens IF	3
6	MODO Hockey	2
4	Västra Frölunda	1
2	Färjestads BK	3

Finale]
1	Djurgårdens IF	2
2	Färjestads BK	3
