= 1984–85 Division 1 season (Swedish ice hockey) =

- League: Division 1
- Sport: Ice hockey
- Number of teams: 40
- Promoted to Division 1: MoDo AIK; HV71 to Elitserien
- Relegated to Division 2: Antjärns IK; IFK Ore; SPAIF; KBA-67

Division 1 seasons
- ← 1983–84 1985–86 →

1984–85 was the 10th season that Division 1 operated as the second tier of ice hockey in Sweden, below the top-flight Elitserien (now the Swedish Hockey League).

== Format ==
Division 1 was divided into four starting groups of 10 teams each. The top two teams in each group qualified for the Allsvenskan, while the remaining eight teams had to compete in a qualifying round in which the results carried over from the first round. The top two teams from each qualifying round qualified for the playoffs. The last team in each of the qualifying groups was relegated directly to Division 2, while the second-to-last-place team had to play in a relegation series.

Of the eight teams in the Allsvenskan, the top two teams qualified for the Allsvenskan final, with the winner being promoted directly to the Elitserien (now the SHL), while the loser qualified for the Kvalserien, which offered another opportunity to be promoted. The third to sixth ranked teams in the Allsvenskan qualified for the second round of the playoffs. The two playoff winners qualified for the Kvalserien, in which the first-place team qualified for the following Elitserien season.

== Regular season ==
=== Northern Group ===
==== First round ====
	Club	GP	W	T	L	GF	GA	Pts
1.	MoDo AIK	18	15	1	2	172	60	31
2.	CRIF	18	12	2	4	84	77	26
3.	Timrå IK	18	9	3	6	86	74	21
4.	Östersunds IK	18	8	4	6	73	69	20
5.	Tegs SK	18	7	6	5	97	96	20
6.	IK Polar	18	9	1	8	89	95	19
7.	Piteå IF	18	7	1	10	86	94	15
8.	Kiruna AIF	18	6	3	9	75	83	15
9.	Bodens BK	18	4	0	14	56	117	8
10.	Antjärns IK	18	2	1	15	58	111	5

==== Qualification round ====
	Club	GP	W	T	L	GF	GA	Pts
1.	Timrå IK	32	18	5	9	170	122	41
2.	Östersunds IK	32	16	9	7	140	107	41
3.	IK Polar	32	16	3	13	160	142	35
4.	Tegs SK	32	12	8	12	155	161	32
5.	Piteå IF	32	12	4	16	151	180	28
6.	Kiruna AIF	32	10	6	16	128	149	26
7.	Bodens BK	32	8	2	22	103	187	18
8.	Antjärns IK	32	6	2	24	109	187	14

=== Western Group ===
==== First round ====
	Club	GP	W	T	L	GF	GA	Pts
1.	Strömsbro/Gävle	18	16	0	2	130	66	32
2.	Västerås IK	18	15	1	2	145	49	31
3.	Vallentuna BK	18	13	1	4	104	74	27
4.	Mora IK	18	8	2	8	76	66	18
5.	Falu IF	18	9	0	9	76	76	18
6.	Väsby IK	18	8	2	8	76	83	18
7.	Malungs IF	18	5	2	11	79	116	12
8.	Sundsvall/Tunadal	18	5	1	12	73	101	11
9.	HC Dobel	18	4	0	14	65	135	8
10.	IFK Ore	18	1	3	14	52	110	5

==== Qualification round ====
	Club	GP	W	T	L	GF	GA	Pts
1.	Vallentuna BK	32	22	3	7	182	117	47
2.	Mora IK	32	21	2	9	156	92	44
3.	Falu IF	32	17	2	13	163	130	36
4.	Väsby IK	32	15	3	14	154	149	33
5.	Sundsvall/Tunadal	32	12	2	18	143	173	26
6.	Malungs IF	32	10	3	19	134	197	23
7.	HC Dobel	32	7	1	24	117	223	15
8.	IFK Ore	32	1	3	28	78	206	5

=== Eastern Group ===
==== First round ====
	Club	GP	W	T	L	GF	GA	Pts
1.	HV71	18	16	1	1	152	66	33
2.	Örebro IK	18	15	0	3	114	60	30
3.	IK Vita Hästen	18	12	2	4	114	65	26
4.	Huddinge IK	18	11	2	5	102	71	24
5.	Mariestads BoIS	18	9	1	8	78	77	19
6.	Nacka HK	18	7	1	10	91	104	15
7.	Bofors IK	18	4	2	12	66	105	10
8.	Skövde IK	18	4	1	13	67	122	9
9.	IK Westmannia	18	3	1	14	76	125	7
10.	SPAIF	18	3	1	14	64	129	7

==== Qualification round ====
	Club	GP	W	T	L	GF	GA	Pts
1.	Huddinge IK	32	23	2	7	190	98	48
2.	IK Vita Hästen	32	20	4	8	196	131	44
3.	Mariestads BoIS	32	15	3	14	145	149	33
4.	Nacka HK	32	14	1	17	174	179	29
5.	Bofors IK	32	10	4	18	128	182	24
6.	IK Westmannia	32	9	1	22	150	210	19
7.	Skövde IK	32	7	3	22	110	206	17
8.	SPAIF	32	7	1	24	130	208	15

=== Southern Group ===
==== First round ====
	Club	GP	W	T	L	GF	GA	Pts
1.	Västra Frölunda HC	18	16	0	2	132	51	32
2.	IF Troja	18	15	1	2	111	53	31
3.	Mörrums GoIS	18	10	2	6	106	92	22
4.	Hanhals BK	18	9	2	7	89	93	20
5.	Rögle BK	18	8	3	7	92	73	19
6.	Tingsryds AIF	18	8	1	9	94	110	17
7.	HC Dalen	18	5	3	10	73	94	13
8.	Mölndals IF	18	5	1	12	52	106	11
9.	Nybro IF	18	4	1	13	65	100	9
10.	KBA-67	18	2	2	12	50	92	6

==== Qualification round ====
	Club	GP	W	T	L	GF	GA	Pts
1.	Hanhals BK	32	18	2	12	184	166	38
2.	Rögle BK	32	15	5	12	160	125	35
3.	Tingsryds AIF	32	15	4	13	165	181	34
4.	Mörrums GoIS	32	12	4	16	166	187	28
5.	Mölndals IF	32	12	3	17	117	166	27
6.	HC Dalen	32	11	4	17	125	149	26
7.	Nybro IF	32	11	4	17	127	156	26
8.	KBA-67	32	5	5	22	108	165	15

== Allsvenskan ==
	Club	GP	W	T	L	GF	GA	Pts
1.	MoDo AIK	14	10	2	2	77	42	22
2.	IF Troja	14	8	1	5	72	65	17
3.	Västra Frölunda HC	14	7	2	5	72	63	16
4.	Strömsbro/Gävle	14	7	1	6	73	68	15
5.	HV71	14	6	2	6	89	72	14
6.	Västerås IK	14	5	4	5	71	61	14
7.	Örebro IK	14	5	2	7	56	58	12
8.	CRIF	14	1	0	13	30	111	2

=== Final ===
- MoDo AIK - IF Troja 3:0 (7:4, 5:2, 6:4)

== Playoffs ==
=== First round ===
- Timrå IK - Mora IK 0:2 (5:6 OT, 0:14)
- Vallentuna BK - Östersunds IK 2:1 (8:4, 5:6 OT, 7:3)
- Huddinge IK - Rögle BK 2:1 (2:1 OT, 3:4, 3:1)
- Hanhals BK - IK Vita Hästen 2:1 (6:7 OT, 8:4, 7:6)

=== Second round ===
- Västra Frölunda IF - Mora IK 2:1 (3:5, 5:4, 3:2)
- Strömsbro/Gävle - Huddinge IK 2:1 (5:4, 4:5, 5:3)
- HV71 - Vallentuna BK 2:0 (11:3, 6:4)
- Västerås IK - Hanhals BK 2:0 (12:3, 10:0)

=== Third round ===
- Strömsbro/Gävle - HV71 0:2 (3:8, 2:5)
- Västra Frölunda IF - Västerås IK 1:2 (4:7, 4:3, 2:8)
