= Kent Johansson =

Swedish ice hockey player and coach

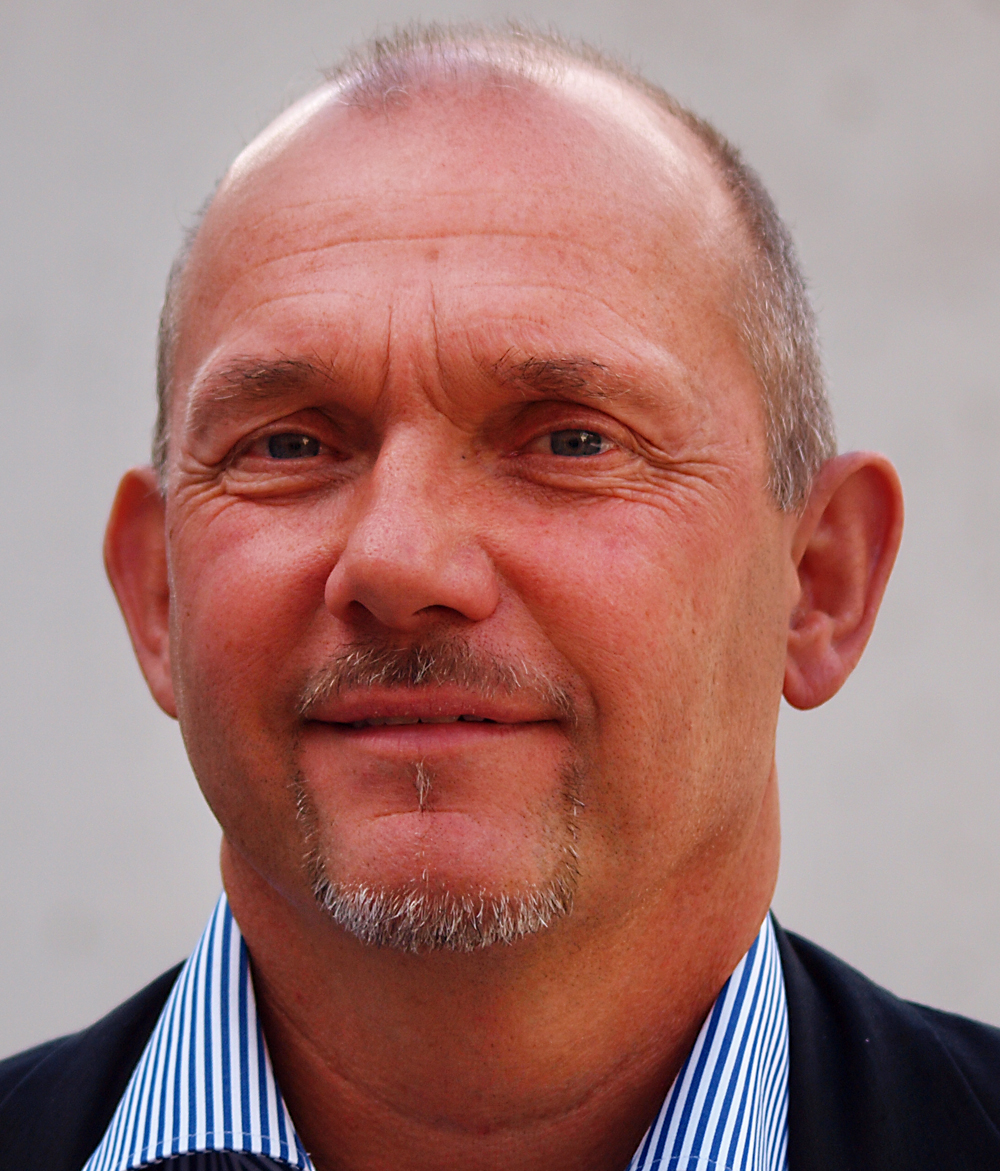
- Kent Johansson in September 2010
- Born: 13 April 1956 (age 69); Katrineholm, Sweden
- Height: 5 ft 9 in (175 cm)
- Weight: 168 lb (76 kg; 12 st 0 lb)
- Position: Forward
- Shot: Left
- Played for: Djurgårdens IF; HC Lugano
- National team: Sweden
- Playing career: 1973–1994

Kent "Lill-Kenta" Johansson (born 13 April 1956) is a retired Swedish ice hockey player, former head coach of Frölunda HC in Elitserien.

== Playing career ==
Johansson started his playing career with Huddinge IK in the Swedish tier two league in 1973. From 1975, the club became a top team in the division, mostly every year participating in playoffs to advance to Elitserien, so Johansson wanted to stay and advance with the team, turning down offers from other clubs for many years. In 1982, he finally gave in, and at 26, choosing between newly promoted neighbor team Hammarby IF and more regular Djurgårdens IF in Elitserien, he chose the latter. He won the Swedish Championships with the club 1983 and then went to play with HC Lugano for six seasons, winning the Swiss Nationalliga A three times; 1986, 1987 and 1988. In 1989 he returned home to Sweden, played his second season with Djurgården and won his second Swedish Championship with the club. He then returned to his original club Huddinge, still an annual runner up in the qualification rounds to Elitserien, and played four more years there, and was close to a promotion in 1993.

Johansson has also played for the Swedish national team in the 1983 and 1985 World Championships.

== Coaching career ==
Johansson started his coaching career in 1994, changing from playing to coaching in Huddinge IK. Between 1995 and 2002 he coached Södertälje SK (one season), HC Bolzano, IK Nyköpings Hockey NH90 and Djurgårdens IF (one season). From 2002 to 2007 he managed Timrå IK in Elitserien, but for season 2007–08 he signed with HV71, and won the Swedish Championships as a coach as well. After losing the finals in 2009 with HV71, Johansson signed with HC Lugano in Switzerland.

== Awards ==
- Elitserien Champion with Djurgårdens IF in 1983 and 1990 (player).
- Nationalliga A Champion with HC Lugano in 1986, 1987 and 1988.
- Elitserien Champion with HV71 in 2008 (coach).
- Elitserien silver medal with HV71 in 2009 (coach).
