= HV71 =

- City: Jönköping, Sweden
- League: Swedish Hockey League
- Founded: May 24, 1971
- Home arena: Husqvarna Garden (capacity: 7,000)
- Colors
- General manager: Johan Hult
- Head coach: Niklas Eriksson
- Captain: Olle Alsing
- Website: hv71.se

Franchise history
- 1971: Huskvarna/Vätterstads IF
- 1971–present: HV71

Championships
- Regular season titles: (5) (2004, 2006, 2008, 2010, 2011)
- Le Mat Trophy: (5) (1995, 2004, 2008, 2010, 2017)

HV71 (Swedish pronunciation: [ˈhôːveː ˌɧɵtːɪˈɛtː]), also known as Huskvarna/Vätterstads 71 or often referred to as just HV, is a Swedish professional ice hockey club based in Jönköping, playing in the Swedish Hockey League (SHL), the first tier of Swedish ice hockey. The team played in the 2008–09 Champions Hockey League season, and has also participated in the new Champions Hockey League tournament since the 2014–15 season. Between 2008 and 2013, HV also participated in the European Trophy tournament. With the exception of a one-year stint in the 2021–22 season in Sweden's second tier, HockeyAllsvenskan, where they won the promotion playoffs, the club has played continuously in the SHL since being promoted in the 1984–85 season.

== History ==
HV71 was founded on May 24, 1971, as a merger between Husqvarna IF and Vätterstads IK, and initially used the name Huskvarna/Vätterstads IF, but later that year it was shortened to the current name HV71. The club were first promoted to the top Swedish league, Elitserien, in the 1978–79 season, but were relegated after only one season. They were promoted again in the 1984–85 season and have remained in the top division ever since, with the exception of the 2021–22 season and are as of the 2000s a well-established top club in Sweden. The club has won the national championship 5 times; 1994–95, 2003–04, 2007–08, 2009–10 and 2016–17. For a few years in the late 1990s, HV71 was also called the Blue Bulls.

Many Swedes associate HV71 with the club's old arena Rosenlundshallen, which was inaugurated in 1958 as Sweden's first indoor ice hockey arena, but was replaced in 2000 with the new and improved Kinnarps Arena. As the new arena was built around and on top of Rosenlundshallen, HV71 practically played its games, in the 1999–2000 season on a construction site.

On December 6, 2006, HV71 topped the Elitserien after a 5–2 win over Färjestads BK, at the same time, the club's two youth teams (under 20 and 18 years old) topped their leagues, J20 SuperElit and J18 Elit. This was an event that had never happened before in HV71's club history.

=== 1994–95 season ===
HV71 won its first national championship in the 1994–95 season as the last (8th) team to qualify for the playoffs. The club remains the only team in Swedish ice hockey history to win the play-offs after finishing in 8th place after the end of the regular season. In the quarter-finals HV beat Djurgårdens IF Hockey, the team that finished first in the regular season, in three straight games. In the semifinals they came back, after having lost the first two games to Malmö Redhawks, the team who was the defending champions, and turned the series around to a 3–2 victory. Finally they managed a decisive sudden death victory in the finals against Brynäs IF, in the fourth period of the fifth game to win the championship. The name of the historical scorer was Johan Lindbom, but other big heroes during the play-offs were the goalie Boo Ahl and the Finnish center-forward Esa Keskinen.

=== 2003–04 season ===
The second championship was won during the 2003–04 season after beating Modo Hockey with a 4–2 series, Frölunda HC with 4–2 in games in the semi-finals, and then winning the finals with a 4–3 match series against Färjestads BK. In the quarter-finals HV71 set a new Swedish record, for scoring the most goals in one period, with seven in the first period, of the second game against Modo Hockey. In fact, they scored the seven goals, during the last ten minutes of the period. The game ended with a 10–1 victory. In the final, goalie Stefan Liv managed to keep his goal empty, in all four games that the team won, the two last games ending 1–0 and 5–0 respectively. He also kept the goal empty in the last semi-final, which means he managed this, for 5 consecutive wins.

=== 2006–07 season ===
HV71 ended the regular season as the second placed team after Färjestads BK. HV chose to meet Brynäs IF in the quarter-finals and managed after seven games (4 wins and 3 losses) to continue to the semifinals. The team faced Modo Hockey and even with home advantage HV did not manage to proceed to the finals having lost 4 out of 7 games. This meant that HV for the second consecutive year lost a 7-game series in the semifinals to the eventual Swedish champions.

During the season the newly acquired defenceman Johan Åkerman was a trendsetting player and also made his national debut for Sweden at the age of 34. HV's starting goaltender, Erik Ersberg, had his breakthrough and played for the national team; and was awarded with the Honken Trophy as Sweden's best goaltender. During the off-season he signed with the NHL team Los Angeles Kings.

== Season-by-season record ==
This is a partial list, featuring the five most recent completed seasons. For a more complete list, see List of HV71 seasons.

Season	GP	W	L	OT	Pts	GF	GA	Finish	Playoffs
2020–21	52	12	30	10	51	127	167	14th, SHL	Lost Play out, 1–4 (Brynäs IF) Relegated to HockeyAllsvenskan
2021–22	52	34	10	8	116	189	118	1st, HockeyAllsvenskan	Promoted to SHL, 4–2 (IF Björklöven)
2022–23	52	15	21	16	68	138	151	11th, SHL	Did not qualify
2023–24	52	13	30	9	53	130	175	13th, SHL	Won Play out, 4–3 (IK Oskarshamn)
2024–25	52	13	27	12	57	127	164	14th, SHL	Won Play out, 4–2 (Modo Hockey)

== Players and personnel ==
=== Current roster ===
Updated July 3, 2026

No.	Nat	Player	Pos	S/G	Age	Acquired	Birthplace
60	(Sweden)	Hugo Alnefelt	G	L	25	2024	Danderyd, Sweden
38	(Sweden)	Olle Alsing (C)	D	L	30	2024	Uppsala, Sweden
27	(Canada)	Jonathan Ang	RW	R	28	2024	Markham, Ontario, Canada
55	(Sweden)	Andreas Borgman	D	L	31	2025	Stockholm, Sweden
17	(Sweden)	Isac Brännström	LW	L	28	2023	Nässjö, Sweden
27	(Sweden)	Oscar Davidsson	LW	L	19	2024	Örebro, Sweden
80	(Denmark)	Frederik Dichow	G	R	25	2023	Vojens, Denmark
44	(Sweden)	Hugo Fransson	D	L	22	2023	Tranås, Sweden
19	(Sweden)	Niklas Hansson	D	R	31	2025	Jonstorp, Sweden
82	(Finland)	Santeri Hatakka	D	L	25	2025	Riihimäki, Finland
91	(Finland)	Aleksi Heponiemi	C	L	27	2025	Tampere, Finland
71	(Sweden)	William Ignberg Nilsson	RW	R	25	2024	Umeå, Sweden
36	(Norway)	Martin Johnsen	C	L	22	2025	Hamar, Norway
28	(United States)	Justin Kloos	C	R	32	2025	Lakeville, Minnesota, United States
8	(Sweden)	Lucas Lagerberg Hoen	D	L	22	2025	Mora, Sweden
30	(Finland)	Lassi Lehtinen	G	L	27	2025	Lahti, Finland
16	(Sweden)	Linus Lindström	C	L	28	2025	Skellefteå, Sweden
46	(Finland)	Joona Luoto	LW	L	28	2024	Tampere, Finland
–	(Czech Republic)	Jan Myšák	C	L	24	2026	Litvinov, Czech Republic
96	(Sweden)	Nikola Pasic	C	L	25	2025	Gislaved, Sweden
9	(Sweden)	Hugo Pettersson	LW	R	21	2023	Tranås, Sweden
–	(Canada)	Noah Philp	C	R	28	2026	Canmore, Alberta
39	(Switzerland)	Jamiro Reber	C	L	20	2024	Münsingen, Switzerland
61	(Finland)	Axel Rindell	D	R	26	2025	Espoo, Finland
70	(Czech Republic)	Lukáš Rousek	C	L	27	2025	Ostrov nad Ohri, Czech Republic
40	(Sweden)	Oskar Stål Lyrenäs	RW	R	28	2023	Umeå, Sweden
21	(Sweden)	Mattias Tedenby	LW	L	36	2022	Vetlanda, Sweden
41	(Canada)	Riley Woods	LW	L	28	2025	Regina, Saskatchewan, Canada

=== Team managers ===
- Folke Jörneke (1971–1972)
- Göte Wiklund (1972–1978)
- Dan Hobér (1978–1980)
- Timo Lahtinen (1980–1983)
- Thommie Bergman (1983–1984)
- Bror Hansson (1984–1985)
- Curt Lundmark (1985–1989)
- Lars-Erik Lundström (1989–1993)
- Håkan Nygren (1993–1994)
- Sune Bergman (1994–1998)
- Randy Edmonds (1998)
- Lars-Erik Lundström (1998–2000)
- Harald Lückner (2000–2003)
- Pär Mårts (2003–2007)
- Kent Johansson (2007–2009)
- Janne Karlsson (2009–2011)
- Ulf Dahlén (2011–2013)
- Torgny Bendelin (2013–2014)
- Andreas Johansson (2014–2015)
- Johan Lindbom (2015–2018)
- Stephan Lundh (2018–2020)
- Nicklas Rahm (2020–2021)
- Stephan Lundh (2021)
- Tommy Samuelsson (2021–2023)
- Johan Lindbom (2023)
- Tomas Montén (2023)
- Johan Lindbom (2023–2024)
- Anton Blomqvist (2024–2026)
- Niklas Eriksson (2026–)

=== General managers ===
- Denny Eriksson (1971–1998)
- Dag Larsson (1998–2005)
- Bengt Kinell (2005; Interim)
- Fredrik Stillman (2005–2014)
- Johan Hult (2014–2022)
- Kent Norberg (2022–2024)
- Chris Abbott (2024–2025)
- Björn Liljander (2025–2026)
- Fredrik Stillman (2025–2026; Interim)
- Linus Leise (2026; Interim)
- Johan Hult (2026–)

=== Club committees ===
- Owe Jungåker (1971–2001)
- Per Carendi (2001–2003)
- Lennart Nilforsen (2003–2005)
- Tommy Fritz (2005; Interim)
- Hans-Göran Frick (2005–2015)
- Sten-Åke Karlsson (2015–2021)
- Anders Wilander (2021–2023)
- Andreas Davidsson (2023–2024; Interim)
- Anna-Lena Isaksson (2024–2026)
- Tommy Fritz (2026–)

=== Team captains ===
- Anders Wallin, D, (1971–1978)
- Bo Berggren, C, (1978–1980)
- Hans Wallin, LW, (1980–1983)
- Thomas Lindster, RW, (1983–1988)
- Hasse Sjöö, LW, (1988–1989)
- Klas Heed, D, (1989–1991)
- Fredrik Stillman, D, (1991–1992)
- Thomas Ljungbergh, W, (1992–1993)
- Fredrik Stillman, D, (1993–1995)
- Stefan Örnskog, LW, (1995–1996)
- Fredrik Stillman, D, (1996–1999)
- Per Gustafsson, D, (1999–2002)
- Johan Davidsson, C, (2002–2013)
- Pasi Puistola, D, (2011; Interim)
- David Petrasek, D, (2013–2014)
- Oscar Fantenberg, D, (2014; Interim)
- Andreas Jämtin, LW, (2014; Interim)
- Ted Brithén, C, (2014–2016)
- Jere Karalahti, D, (2014–2015; Interim)
- Chris Campoli, D, (2015; Interim)
- Chris Abbott, C, (2016–2017)
- Martin Thörnberg, LW, (2016; Interim)
- Martin Thörnberg, LW, (2017–2019)
- Simon Önerud, LW, (2019–2022)
- Taylor Matson C, (2022–2023)
- Niklas Hjalmarsson, D, (2023)
- Taylor Matson C, (2023; Interim)
- André Petersson, RW, (2023–2024)
- Anton Strålman D, (2023–2024; Interim)
- Joonas Nättinen C, (2024; Interim)
- Olle Alsing, D, (2024–present)

=== Retired numbers ===
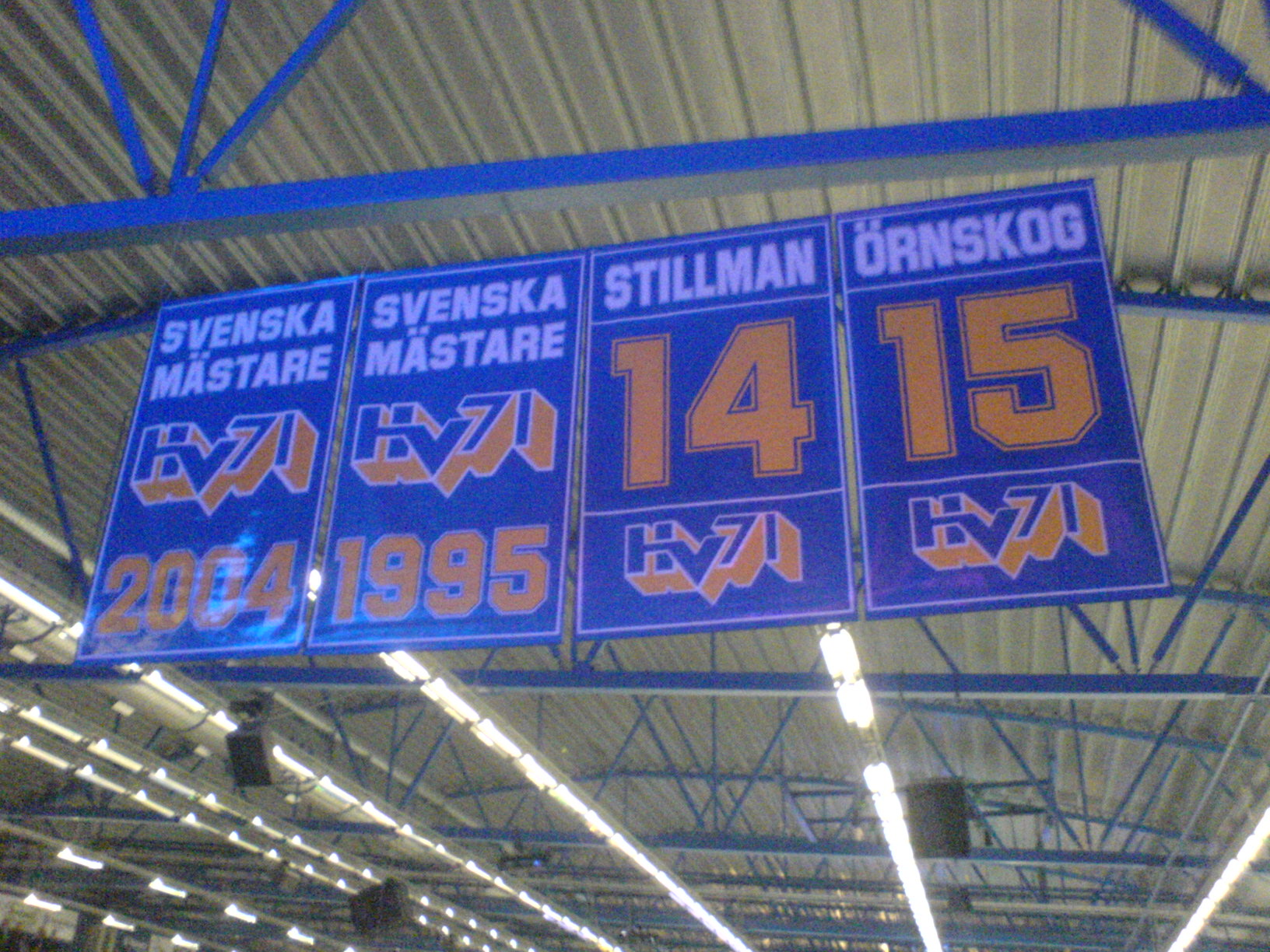
HV71's first two championship banners hang alongside the first two player numbers that were retired by the club

HV71 retired numbers
No.	Player	Position	Career	No. retirement
14	Fredrik Stillman	D	1981–1995, 1996–1999, 2000–2001	December 26, 2001
15	Stefan Örnskog	LW	1983–1998, 1999–2001	December 26, 2001
7	Per Gustafsson	D	1988–1996, 1998–2010	September 18, 2010
1	Stefan Liv	G	1995–2006, 2007–2010	January 10, 2012
76	Johan Davidsson	C	1990–1997, 2001– 2014	September 27, 2014
22	David Petrasek	D	1991–2000, 2005–2010, 2011–2015	January 27, 2017
10	Martin Thörnberg	LW/RW	1999–2011, 2015–2020, 2021	January 5, 2023

== Club records and leaders ==
=== Individual season records ===
- Most Seasons played: Per Gustafsson, 20 (1988–96), (1998–2010)
- Most Goals in a season: Hans Wallin, 45 (1981–82)
- Most Goals in a season, rookie: Kai Nurminen, 31 (1995–96) (Elitserien record)
- Most Assists in a season: Johan Davidsson, 46 (2009–10)
- Most Assists in a season, rookie: Esa Keskinen, 28 (1994–95)
- Most Points in a season: Hans Wallin, 79 (1981–82)
- Most Elitserien matches played in a row: Andreas Falk, 308 (19 September 2006 – 28 January 2012) (Elitserien record)
- Most Penalty Minutes in a season: Lance Ward, 273 (2006–07) (Elitserien record)
- Most Points in a season, goalkeeper: Andreas Andersson, 4 (2007–08)
- Most Points in a season, defenseman: David Petrasek, 53 (2009–10) (Elitserien record)
- Most Points in a season, rookie: Kai Nurminen, 55 (1995–96) (Elitserien record)
- Fastest Goal scored: Per Gustafsson, 6 seconds (17 October 1991) (Elitserien record)
- Longest Time without conceding a goal: Hannau Lassila, 184 minutes and 6 seconds (28 October 1979 – 11 November 1979)
- Most Shutouts: Stefan Liv, 43
- Most Shutouts in a season: Stefan Liv, 6 (2003–04)

=== Scoring leaders ===
These are the top-ten point-scorers in club's history. Figures are updated after each completed SHL regular season.

Note: Pos = Position; GP = Games played; G = Goals; A = Assists; Pts = Points; P/G = Points per game; = current HV71 player

Points
Player	Pos	GP	G	A	Pts
Johan Davidsson	C	920	205	461	666
Hans Wallin	LW	423	264	255	519
Bengt Kinell	LW	334	198	244	442
Jan Bergstrand	RW	310	254	186	440
Per Gustafsson	D	854	141	251	392
Martin Thörnberg	LW	718	214	173	387
Ove Thörnberg	LW	552	200	147	347
Fredrik Stillman	D	657	109	231	340
Stefan Örnskog	C	478	115	164	279
Jukka Voutilainen	RW	352	120	157	277

== Trophies and awards ==
=== Team ===
Le Mat Trophy

- Winners: 1994–95, 2003–04, 2007–08, 2009–10, 2016–17
- Runners-up: 2008–09

SHL Regular Season

- Winners: 2003–04, 2005–06, 2007–08, 2009–10, 2010–11
- Runners-up: 2006–07, 2016–17
- Third place: 1985–86, 2011–12

HockeyAllsvenskan

- Winners: 2021–22

HockeyAllsvenskan Playoffs

- Winners: 2021–22

Division 1 Regular Season

- Winners: 1976–77, 1980–81, 1981–82, 1982–83, 1984–85
- Runners-up: 1977–78, 1978–79, 1983–84
- Third place: 1975–76

Allsvenskan Division 1

Third place: 1983–84

Kvalserien Division 1

- Winners: 1984–85
- Runners-up: 1978–79
- Third place: 1976–77, 1982–83

Division 2 Regular Season

- Winners: 1973–74, 1974–75

Kvalserien Division 2

- Runners-up: 1974–75
- Third place: 1973–74

European Trophy

- Runners-up: 2010
- Third place: 2009

Tampere Cup

- Winners: 1998
- Third place: 2002, 2003

=== Individual ===
Coach of the Year

- Sune Bergman: 1994–95
- Pär Mårts: 2003–04
- Kent Johansson: 2007–08

Guldhjälmen

- Kari Eloranta: 1985–86
- Esa Keskinen: 1995–96
- Andreas Karlsson: 2005–06
- Johan Davidsson: 2008–09

Håkan Loob Trophy

- Andreas Karlsson: 2005–06

Guldpucken

- Ulf Dahlén: 1997–98
- Johan Davidsson: 2003–04
- Stefan Liv: 2007–08

Guldskridskon

- Fredrik Stillman: 1994–95

Stefan Liv Memorial Trophy

- Johan Davidsson: 2009–10
- Simon Önerud: 2016–17

Honken Trophy

- Stefan Liv: 2001–02
- Erik Ersberg: 2006–07
- Gustaf Wesslau: 2012–13

Rinkens riddare

- Johan Davidsson: 2002–03
- Johan Davidsson: 2003–04
- Johan Davidsson: 2004–05
- Jesper Fast: 2012–13
- Martin Thörnberg: 2016–17
- Markus Ljungh: 2018–19

HV71 Player of the Year

- Hans Wallin: 1983–84
- Thomas Lindster: 1984–85
- Kari Eloranta: 1985–86, 1986–87

Årets Gentleman

- Johan Davidsson: 2002–03, 2003–04, 2004–05

Salming Trophy

- Mikko Luoma: 2007–08
- Lawrence Pilut: 2017–18

Swedish All Star Team

- Fredrik Stillman: 1992–93
- Boo Ahl, Per Gustafsson: 1995–96
- Ulf Dahlén: 1997–98
- Johan Davidsson: 2002–03
- Per Gustafsson, Johan Davidsson: 2003–04
- Andreas Karlsson: 2005–06
- Johan Åkerman, Johan Davidsson: 2006–07
- Stefan Liv, Johan Åkerman, Johan Davidsson: 2007–08
- Johan Davidsson, David Petrasek: 2009–10

Årets Poängkung

- Fredrik Forsberg: 2021–22

Årets Forward

- Fredrik Forsberg: 2021–22

Guldgallret

- Emil Andrae: 2021–22

Årets Junior

- Peter Madach: 1979–80

Rookie of the Year

- William Karlsson: 2012–13
- Andreas Borgman: 2016–17

Preceded by Malmö IF	Swedish ice hockey champions 1995	Succeeded by Luleå HF
Preceded by Västra Frölunda HC	Swedish ice hockey champions 2004	Succeeded by Frölunda HC
Preceded by Modo Hockey	Swedish ice hockey champions 2008	Succeeded by Färjestads BK
Preceded by Färjestads BK	Swedish ice hockey champions 2010	Succeeded by Färjestads BK
Preceded by Frölunda HC	Swedish ice hockey champions 2017	Succeeded by
