= 2008–09 HV71 season =

Swedish ice hockey club season

2008–09 HV71
- League: 4th Elitserien
- 2008–09 record: 22–13–20
- Home record: 11–6–10
- Road record: 11–7–10
- Goals for: 160
- Goals against: 144

Team information
- General manager: Fredrik Stillman
- Coach: Kent Johansson
- Captain: Johan Davidsson
- Alternate captains: Per Gustafsson; David Petrasek
- Arena: Kinnarps Arena
- Average attendance: 6,984 (99%)

Team leaders
- Goals: Martin Thörnberg (27)
- Assists: Johan Davidsson (37)
- Points: Johan Davidsson (50)
- Penalty minutes: Kris Beech (106)
- Wins: Stefan Liv (15)
- Goals against average: Christoffer Bengtsberg (2.00)

The 2008–09 HV71 season saw HV71's attempt to defend their Swedish Championship title and win the regular season for a second consecutive season. It was the 25th season in the Swedish elite league Elitserien for the club. The club ended fourth after the regular season and managed to go to the finals but was beaten by Färjestads BK who won the Swedish Championship.

HV71 started the season in the beginning of August playing in the Nordic Trophy, finishing in fifth place, and continued to play in an exhibition game against Malmö Redhawks. HV71 opened the Elitserien regular season against Frölunda HC on September 15, winning the game 6–2. During the first 16 regular season games HV71 never scored the first goal in any of the matches. After the end of the regular season, HV71 ended as the fourth ranked team in the Elitserien regular season standings.

During the season, HV71 played in the inaugural season of the Champions Hockey League. The first group stage match was played in Jönköping on October 8 against the Swiss team SC Bern. HV71 won the game with a score of 6–2. The group stage matches were played in October to beginning of December 2008. HV71 finished second in group B and did not qualify for the semi-finals.

== Off-season ==
April 28: Defenceman Per Gustafsson and winger Johan Lindström re-signed with HV71. Both agreed to a one-year extension. Defenceman Lance Ward and centre Jari Kauppila left for play in Germany and Finland respectively.

May 5: Centre Yared Hagos signed a one-year contract with HV71 as their first new signing for the season 2008–09.

May 8: Defenceman Johan Åkerman left and signed with the Russian team Lokomotiv Yaroslav.

May 9: HV71 signed defenceman Nicholas Angell to a one-year contract. Due to Swedish tax laws Angell will join the club in October 2008.

May 19: HV71 signed youth players Henrik Eriksson, Simon Önerud, David Ullström and youth goaltender Christoffer Bengtsberg to a one-year contract.

June 19: HV71 signed right winger Kim Staal to a one-year contract.

June 21: Left winger Mattias Tedenby drafted by the New Jersey Devils in the 2008 NHL entry draft.

July 1: Wingers Per Ledin and Andreas Jämtin used their NHL out-clauses and signed with the Colorado Avalanche and New York Rangers, respectively.

July 8: HV71 signed winger Teemu Laine to a one-year contract.

July 22: HV71 re-signed winger David Fredriksson to a one-year contract.

== Pre-season ==
HV71 began the pre-season playing in the Swedish-Finnish tournament Nordic Trophy, a total of nine games plus two playoff games, from August 7 to September 6, 2008. HV71 ended the tournament as the fifth placed team after defeating Färjestads BK in the last playoff game. Before the regular Elitserien season started HV71 played against the HockeyAllsvenskan team Malmö Redhawks in Malmö.

=== Nordic Trophy ===
==== Standings ====
Nordic Trophy	GP	W	L	T	OTW	OTL	PSW	PSL	GF	GA	PTS
y- (Sweden) Linköpings HC	9	7	2	0	0	0	0	0	31	19	14
y- (Sweden) Frölunda HC	9	7	2	0	0	0	0	0	25	18	14
y- (Sweden) Djurgårdens IF	9	6	3	0	0	0	0	0	33	23	12
y- (Finland) HIFK	9	4	3	2	0	0	2	0	30	26	12
x- (Finland) Kärpät	9	5	4	0	0	0	0	0	20	17	10
x- (Finland) TPS	9	3	5	1	0	0	1	0	18	29	8
x- (Sweden) Färjestads BK	9	3	5	1	0	0	0	1	22	27	7
x- (Sweden) HV71	9	3	6	0	0	0	0	0	19	25	6
z- (Finland) Jokerit	9	2	6	1	0	0	0	1	24	29	5
z- (Finland) Tappara	9	2	6	1	0	0	0	1	21	30	5

y - clinched semi-final spot for championship, x - clinched semi-final spot for 5th place, z - play for 9th place

==== Game log ====
2008 Nordic Trophy game log

3–6–0 (Home: 1–3–0; Road: 2–3–0)
#	Date	Visitor	Score	Home	OT	Decision	Attendance	Record	Pts	Recap
1	August 7	HV71	3 – 2	Jokerit		Andersson	952	1–0–0	2
2	August 8	HV71	0 – 2	Kärpät		Liv	2,741	1–1–0	2
3	August 10	HV71	4 – 5	Tappara		Andersson	490	1–2–0	2
4	August 21	HIFK	5 – 3	HV71		Liv	997	1–3–0	2
5	August 22	TPS	0 – 2	HV71		Bengtsberg		2–3–0	4
6	August 24	Djurgårdens IF	2 – 1	HV71		Liv	4,700	2–4–0	4
7	August 26	Linköpings HC	3 – 2	HV71		Liv	932	2–5–0	4
8	August 29	HV71	0 – 4	Frölunda HC		Bengtsberg	1,300	2–6–0	4
9	September 2	HV71	4 – 2	Färjestads BK		Liv	2,604	3–6–0	6

Legend: Win (2 points) Loss (0 points)

==== Playoffs ====
HV71 ended the 2008 Nordic Trophy regular round as the eight seed. The played in the semi-final for the fifth place game against Kärpät. With a win over the Finnish team, HV71 played and won against Färjestads BK and clinched a final Nordic Trophy ranking as the fifth placed team.

2008 Nordic Trophy Playoffs

#	Date	Visitor	Score	Home	OT	Decision	Attendance	Playoff	Recap
1	September 5	HV71	2 – 0	Kärpät		Liv	118	HV71 advance to the 5th place game
2	September 6	HV71	4 – 3	Färjestads BK	OT	Bengtsberg	317	HV71 win the 5th place game

Legend: Win Overtime win Loss

== Regular season ==
=== Standings ===
Elitserien	GP	W	L	T	OTW	OTL	GF	GA	Pts
y – Färjestads BK	55	30	17	4	1	3	158	122	99
x – Linköpings HC	55	26	16	8	1	4	166	152	92
x – Frölunda HC	55	25	20	2	6	2	144	130	91
x – HV71	55	22	13	9	4	7	160	144	90
x – Luleå HF	55	26	20	3	0	6	149	136	87
x – Skellefteå AIK	55	21	22	3	5	4	149	141	80
x – Brynäs IF	55	21	22	6	4	2	128	140	79
x – Timrå IK	55	19	24	4	7	1	152	142	76
e – Modo Hockey	55	20	27	2	4	2	153	177	72
e – Djurgårdens IF	55	17	23	8	5	2	149	155	71
r – Rögle BK	55	18	25	4	1	7	152	178	67
r – Södertälje SK	55	12	28	7	5	3	122	165	56

x – clinched playoff spot; y – clinched regular season league title; e – eliminated from playoff contention; r – play in relegation series

=== Game log ===
2008–09 Game log

September: 2–4–1 (Home: 1–3–0; Road: 1–1–1)
#	Date	Visitor	Score	Home	OT	Decision	Attendance	Record	Pts	Recap
7	September 15	Frölunda HC	2 – 6	HV71		Liv	7,038	1–0–0	3
1	September 18	HV71	5 – 6	Timrå IK		Liv	5,414	1–1–0	3
2	September 21	Brynäs IF	3 – 1	HV71		Liv	6,893	1–2–0	3
3	September 23	HV71	3 – 3	Södertälje SK	OT	Liv	3,318	1–2–1	4
4	September 25	Skellefteå AIK	3 – 0	HV71		Liv	6,914	1–3–1	4
5	September 27	HV71	3 – 2	Luleå HF		Liv	3,857	2–3–1	7
6	September 29	Linköpings HC	3 – 1	HV71		Liv	6,965	2–4–1	7

October: 2–4–4 (Home: 1–1–3; Road: 1–3–1)
#	Date	Visitor	Score	Home	OT	Decision	Attendance	Record	Pts	Recap
20	October 4	Djurgårdens IF	2 – 3	HV71		Liv	6,908	3–4–1	10
9	October 9	HV71	5 – 1	Modo Hockey		Andersson	6,024	4–4–1	13
10	October 11	Rögle BK	2 – 3	HV71	OT	Andersson	7,038	4–4–2	15
11	October 14	HV71	2 – 4	Färjestads BK		Liv	6,023	4–5–2	15
12	October 16	Timrå IK	1 – 2	HV71	OT	Liv	6,849	4–5–3	17
13	October 18	HV71	3 – 5	Frölunda HC		Liv	12,044	4–6–3	17
8	October 21	Djurgårdens IF	2 – 2	HV71	OT	Liv	6,987	4–6–4	18
14	October 23	Södertälje SK	3 – 6	HV71		Liv	6,851	5–6–4	21
15	October 25	Modo Hockey	5 – 2	HV71		Liv	7,020	5–7–4	21
16	October 27	HV71	2 – 1	Linköpings HC	OT	Andersson	8,500	5–7–5	23
17	October 30	HV71	1 – 5	Skellefteå AIK		Andersson	5,665	5–8–5	23

November: 3–0–6 (Home: 1–0–3; Road: 2–0–3)
#	Date	Visitor	Score	Home	OT	Decision	Attendance	Record	Pts	Recap
18	November 1	Färjestads BK	3 – 4	HV71		Liv	7,038	6–8–5	26
19	November 3	HV71	3 – 4	Brynäs IF	OT	Liv	4,408	6–8–6	27
21	November 15	HV71	2 – 1	Rögle BK		Liv	5,043	7–8–6	30
22	November 18	Luleå HF	1 – 1	HV71	OT	Andersson	7,012	7–8–7	31
23	November 20	HV71	3 – 2	Södertälje SK	OT	Andersson	3,526	7–8–8	33
24	November 22	Skellefteå AIK	4 – 3	HV71	OT	Andersson	6,951	7–8–9	34
25	November 24	HV71	1 – 1	Luleå HF	OT	Andersson	4,378	7–8–10	35
26	November 27	Frölunda HC	3 – 2	HV71	OT	Andersson	7,038	7–8–11	36
27	November 29	HV71	5 – 1	Djurgårdens IF		Andersson	6,092	8–8–11	39

December: 6–1–2 (Home: 3–1–1; Road: 3–0–1)
#	Date	Visitor	Score	Home	OT	Decision	Attendance	Record	Pts	Recap
28	December 1	Rögle BK	2 – 3	HV71		Andersson	6,865	9–8–11	42
29	December 4	HV71	2 – 3	Timrå IK	OT	Andersson	5,409	9–8–12	43
30	December 6	Brynäs IF	2 – 2	HV71	OT	Andersson	6,982	9–8–13	44
31	December 8	Linköpings HC	6 – 5	HV71		Andersson	7,038	9–9–13	44
32	December 11	HV71	3 – 2	Färjestads BK		Andersson	5,631	10–9–13	47
33	December 14	HV71	4 – 1	Modo Hockey		Andersson	5,562	11–9–13	50
34	December 26	Södertälje SK	2 – 3	HV71		Bengtsberg	7,038	12–9–13	53
35	December 28	HV71	6 – 4	Brynäs IF		Liv	6,202	13–9–13	56
36	December 30	Modo Hockey	2 – 3	HV71		Liv	7,038	14–9–13	59

January: 5–1–4 (Home: 2–0–1; Road: 3–1–3)
#	Date	Visitor	Score	Home	OT	Decision	Attendance	Record	Pts	Recap
37	January 3	HV71	2 – 1	Djurgårdens IF		Liv	8,092	15–9–13	62
38	January 5	HV71	5 – 6	Rögle BK		Andersson	4,940	15–10–13	62
39	January 8	Timrå IK	1 – 1	HV71	OT	Liv	6,904	15–10–14	63
40	January 10	Färjestads BK	0 – 2	HV71		Liv	7,038	16–10–14	66
41	January 15	HV71	3 – 3	Linköpings HC	OT	Liv	8,500	16–10–15	67
42	January 17	HV71	4 – 2	Skellefteå AIK		Liv	5,400	17–10–15	70
43	January 19	Luleå HF	1 – 2	HV71		Liv	7,038	18–10–15	73
44	January 24	HV71	4 – 5	Frölunda HC	OT	Liv	12,044	18–10–16	74
45	January 26	HV71	3 – 2	Södertälje SK	OT	Liv	2,749	18–10–17	75
46	January 29	Linköpings HC	2 – 2	HV71	OT	Liv	7,038	18–10–18	76
47	January 31	HV71	5 – 3	Djurgårdens IF		Liv	8,094	19–10–18	79

February: 3–3–2 (Home: 2–2–1; Road: 1–1–1)
#	Date	Visitor	Score	Home	OT	Decision	Attendance	Record	Pts	Recap
48	February 12	HV71	3 – 3	Timrå IK	OT	Liv	5,414	19–10–19	80
49	February 14	Skellefteå AIK	3 – 2	HV71		Liv	7,038	19–11–19	80
50	February 17	HV71	6 – 4	Modo Hockey		Andersson	6,485	20–11–19	83
51	February 19	Frölunda HC	3 – 2	HV71	OT	Liv	7,038	20–11–20	84
52	February 21	HV71	1 – 2	Luleå HF		Liv	5,497	20–12–20	84
53	February 24	Brynäs IF	1 – 3	HV71		Liv	7,038	21–12–20	87
54	February 26	HV71	1 – 2	Färjestads BK		Andersson	7,626	21–13–20	87
55	February 28	Rögle BK	2 – 5	HV71		Liv	6,996	22–13–20	90

Legend: Win (3 points) Overtime win (2 point) Loss (0 points) Overtime loss (1 point) Tie (1 point)

== Playoffs ==
HV71 ended the 2008–09 regular season as the fourth placed team and was paired with the last playoff team, the eighth seed, Timrå IK, after the 1st through 3rd seeded teams picked their opponents for the quarterfinals.

2009 Elitserien playoffs

Quarterfinals: vs. (8) Timrå IK - HV71 win series 4–3
#	Date	Visitor	Score	Home	OT	Decision	Attendance	Series	Recap
1	March 5	HV71	1 – 2	Timrå IK		Liv	5,616	Timrå IK lead 1–0
2	March 7	Timrå IK	0 – 7	HV71		Liv	7,038	Tied 1–1
3	March 9	HV71	4 – 5	Timrå IK	OT	Liv	5,892	Timrå IK lead 2–1
4	March 11	Timrå IK	2 – 3	HV71	OT	Liv	7,038	Timrå IK lead 3–1
5	March 12	Timrå IK	1 – 3	HV71		Liv	7,038	Timrå IK lead 3–2
6	March 14	HV71	3 – 2	Timrå IK	OT	Liv	6,000	Tied 3–3
7	March 16	Timrå IK	2 – 4	HV71		Liv	7,038	HV71 win series, 4–3

Semifinals: vs. (3) Frölunda HC - HV71 win series 4–2
#	Date	Visitor	Score	Home	OT	Decision	Attendance	Series	Recap
1	March 19	Frölunda HC	1 – 3	HV71		Liv	7,038	HV71 lead 1–0
2	March 21	HV71	1 – 2	Frölunda HC		Liv	11,902	Tied 1–1
3	March 23	Frölunda HC	3 – 1	HV71		Liv	7,038	Frölunda HC lead 2–1
4	March 25	HV71	6 – 1	Frölunda HC		Liv	12,044	Tied 2–2
5	March 26	HV71	4 – 1	Frölunda HC		Liv	12,044	HV71 lead 3–2
6	March 28	Frölunda HC	2 – 4	HV71		Liv	7,038	HV71 win series, 4–2

Finals: vs. (1) Färjestads BK - Färjestads BK win series, 4–1
#	Date	Visitor	Score	Home	OT	Decision	Attendance	Series	Recap
1	April 1	Färjestads BK	1 – 4	HV71		Liv	7,038	HV71 lead 1–0
2	April 3	HV71	1 – 4	Färjestads BK		Liv	8,250	Tied 1–1
3	April 5	Färjestads BK	3 – 1	HV71		Liv	7,038	Färjestads BK lead 2–1
4	April 7	HV71	2 – 3	Färjestads BK	OT	Liv	8,250	Färjestads BK lead 3–1
5	April 8	HV71	2 – 3	Färjestads BK		Liv	8,250	Färjestads BK win series, 4–1

Legend: Win Overtime win Loss Overtime loss

== Player stats ==
=== Skaters ===
Note: GP = Games played; G = Goals; A = Assists; Pts = Points; +/- = Plus–minus; PIM = Penalties in Minutes

Regular season

Player	GP	G	A	Pts	+/-	PIM
Johan Davidsson	55	13	37	50	2	24
Jukka Voutilainen	52	17	30	47	9	63
Björn Melin	53	8	31	39	15	42
Martin Thörnberg	51	27	11	38	7	88
Kris Beech	45	17	17	34	10	106
Pasi Puistola	54	6	25	31	1	52
Teemu Laine	55	14	15	29	13	90
David Petrasek	52	6	22	28	2	91
Per Gustafsson	49	9	18	27	-7	42
Mikko Luoma	54	5	16	21	2	58

Updated after the end of the regular season

Playoffs

Player	GP	G	A	Pts	+/-	PIM
Martin Thörnberg	18	10	3	13	4	29
Björn Melin	18	5	8	13	3	2
Jukka Voutilainen	18	4	8	12	7	8
Andreas Falk	18	4	7	11	8	16
Mikko Luoma	18	3	8	11	6	14
Johan Davidsson	14	3	7	10	6	2
David Petrasek	12	0	10	10	6	30
Mattias Tedenby	18	6	3	9	8	6
Pasi Puistola	18	1	7	8	6	20
Nicholas Angell	18	2	5	7	6	16

Updated after the end of the playoffs

=== Goaltenders ===
Note: GP = Games played; TOI = Time on ice (minutes); W = Wins; L = Losses; T = Ties; OTW = Overtime Wins; OTL = Overtime Losses GA = Goals against; SO = Shutouts; Sv% = Save percentage; GAA = Goals against average

Regular season

Player	GP	TOI	W	L	T	OTW	OTL	GA	SO	Sv%	GAA
Christoffer Bengtsberg	1	60	1	0	0	0	0	2	0	.931	2.00
Andreas Andersson	19	1214	6	3	4	3	3	51	0	.910	2.52
Stefan Liv	34	2001	15	9	6	1	4	86	1	.911	2.58

Updated after the end of the regular season

Playoffs

Player	GP	TOI	W	L	T	OTW	OTL	GA	SO	Sv%	GAA
Stefan Liv	18	1111	8	5	0	1	3	35	1	.936	1.89

Updated after the end of the playoffs

== Champions Hockey League ==
HV71 played in group B in the 2008–09 Champions Hockey League. The group's matches were played between October 8 and December 3, 2008. HV71 finished on second place and did not qualify for the semi-finals.

=== Group B standings ===
Team	GP	W	OTW	OTL	L	GF	GA	PTS
x- (Finland) Espoo Blues	4	4	0	0	0	13	4	12
e- (Sweden) HV71	4	1	0	0	3	13	18	3
e- (Switzerland) SC Bern	4	1	0	0	3	11	15	3

x - clinched playoff spot, e - eliminated from playoff contention

=== Game log ===
2008 CHL game log

1–3–0 (Home: 1–1–0; Road: 0–2–0)
#	Date	Visitor	Score	Home	OT	Decision	Attendance	Record	Pts	Recap
1	October 8	SC Bern	2 – 6	HV71		Liv	6,903	1–0–0	3
2	October 29	HV71	2 – 3	Espoo Blues		Liv	6,083	1–1–0	3
3	November 12	HV71	5 – 7	SC Bern		Liv	7,057	1–2–0	3
4	December 3	Espoo Blues	6 – 0	HV71		Bengtsberg	5,028	1–3–0	3

Legend: Win (3 points) Overtime win (2 point) Overtime loss (1 point) Loss (0 points)

== Transactions ==
Acquired by HV71
Player	Former team	Contract terms
Teemu Laine	TPS	1 year
Kim Staal	Linköpings HC	1 year
Nicholas Angell	Brynäs IF	1 year
Yared Hagos^{1}	Mora IK	1 year
Veli-Pekka Laitinen	HPK	7 weeks
Kris Beech	Pittsburgh Penguins	1 year
Kamil Piroš	Kölner Haie	1 year^{2}
Johan Björk	Malmö Redhawks	1 year^{2}

Leaving HV71
Player	New team
Per Ledin	Colorado Avalanche
Andreas Jämtin	New York Rangers
Johan Åkerman	Lokomotiv Yaroslavl
Eric Johansson	Leksands IF
Jari Kauppila	Pelicans
Lance Ward	Frankfurt Lions
Yared Hagos^{1}	Södertälje SK

^{1} Left HV71 after 38 games in season 2008–09.
^{2} Contracted in late January for the remainder of season 2008–09.

== Roster ==
Goaltenders: 1 – Stefan Liv; 30 – Christoffer Bengtsberg; 35 – Andreas Andersson	Defencemen: 5 – Mikko Luoma; 7 – Per Gustafsson - A; 8 – Daniel Grillfors; 18 – Nicholas Angell; 19 – Johan Björk; 21 – Pasi Puistola; 22 – David Petrasek - A; 27 – Johan Halvardsson; 38 – Nichlas Torp	Wingers: 9 – Mattias Tedenby; 10 – Martin Thörnberg; 11 – Johan Lindström; 26 – Simon Önerud; 28 – Kim Staal; 31 – Henrik Eriksson; 39 – Jukka Voutilainen; 54 – David Fredriksson; 61 – Jonas Johansson; 91 – Björn Melin; 92 – Teemu Laine	Centers: 16 – Kris Beech; 17 – Andreas Falk; 20 – Kamil Piroš; 24 – Jan Hrdina; 31 – David Ullström; 76 – Johan Davidsson - C; GM: Fredrik Stillman; Coach: Kent Johansson

== Draft picks ==
HV71 players picked at the 2009 NHL entry draft.

Round	#	Player	Position	Nationality	NHL team
7	210	Adam Almqvist	Defender	Sweden	Detroit Red Wings
