= Mattias Tedenby =

Swedish ice hockey player

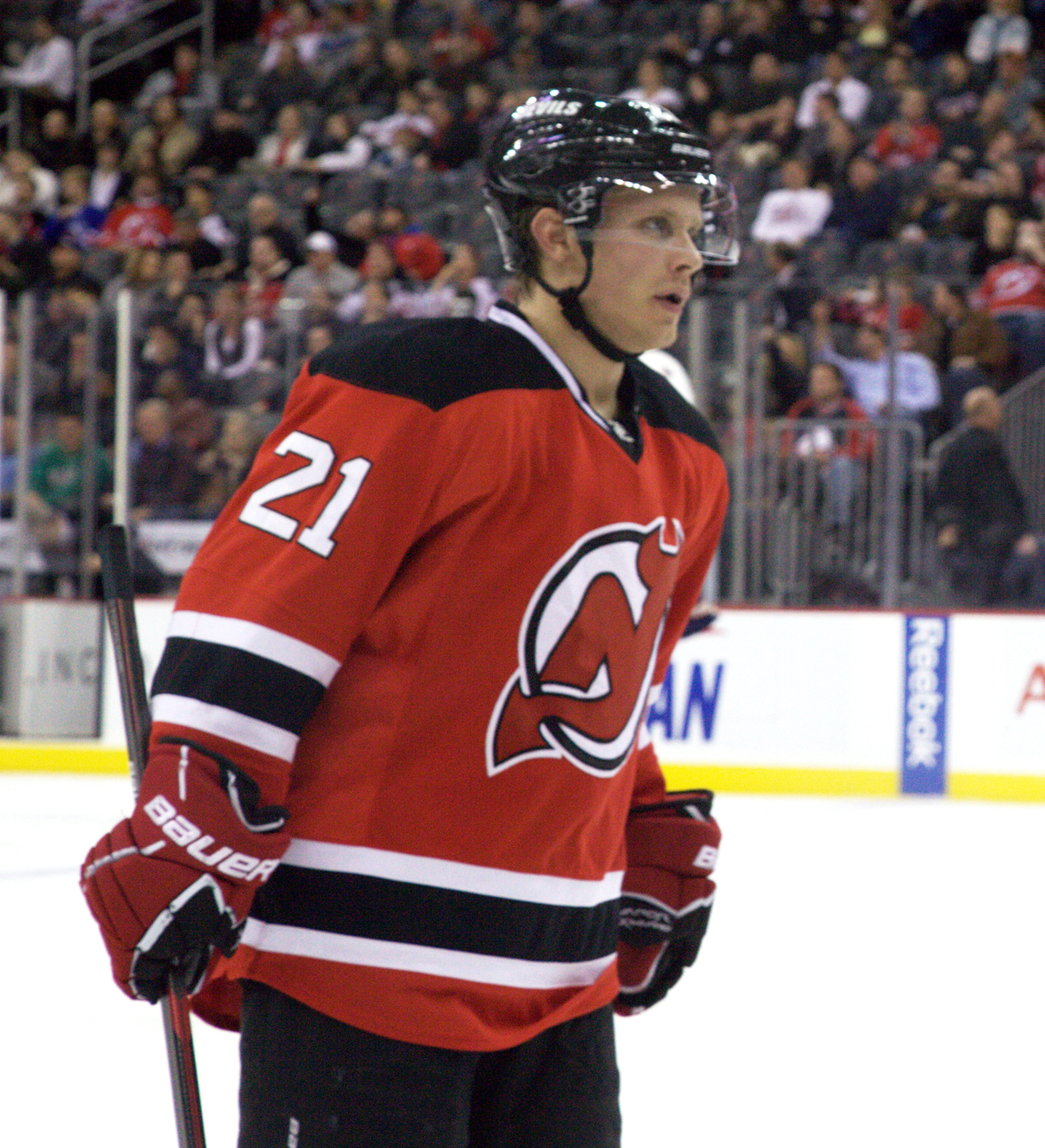
- Tedenby with the New Jersey Devils in 2011
- Born: February 21, 1990 (age 36) Vetlanda, Sweden
- Height: 5 ft 9 in (175 cm)
- Weight: 175 lb (79 kg; 12 st 7 lb)
- Position: Left wing
- Shoots: Left
- SHL team Former teams: HV71; New Jersey Devils; HC Davos; HC Vityaz; Dinamo Minsk
- National team: Sweden
- NHL draft: 24th overall, 2008; New Jersey Devils
- Playing career: 2008–present

Mattias Tedenby (born February 21, 1990) is a Swedish professional ice hockey player who is currently playing in HPK of the Finnish Liiga.

== Playing career ==
Tedenby started his playing career in the Swedish elite league club HV71's youth teams, playing for the under 18 years-team in 2005–06; and both under 18 and under 20 teams in 2006–07 and 2007–08. During the 2007–08 Elitserien season, he was called up HV71's professional team and played in 23 games, scoring six points. During the off-season in 2008, he was contracted for one-year by HV71. After playing in 10 games, including one CHL game, with HV71, Tedenby was loaned to IK Oskarshamn in the second tier league, HockeyAllsvenskan. After 13 games, totalling 11 points, he was recalled to join HV71 again.

Tedenby was drafted in the first round, 24th overall, by the New Jersey Devils in the 2008 NHL entry draft. He signed a three-year, entry-level contract with the Devils on May 14, 2010.

Mattias was announced as the last of four nominees for 2009–10 Elitserien Rookie of the Year on March 4, 2010.

Tedenby made his NHL debut on November 10, 2010 at the Prudential Center and recorded an assist on a goal by Jason Arnott in his first game. Soon after, on November 12, Tedenby recorded his first NHL goal on the power play against Devan Dubnyk of the Edmonton Oilers.

On August 14, 2014, HV71 announced that Tedenby had signed a two-year contract as a free agent to return for a second stint.

On May 15, 2019, having completed his contract with HV71, Tedenby left Sweden to continue his European career by joining Swiss club, HC Davos of the National League on a two-year deal. He was released at the end of the 2019–20 season and joined Russian club, HC Vityaz of the Kontinental Hockey League (KHL) for the 2020–21 season on May 2, 2020.

On 17 August 2021, Tedenby joined HC Dinamo Minsk as a free agent on a one-year contract for the 2021–22 season.

In July 2022, Tedenby rejoined HV71.

== Personal life ==
Tedenby's father, Robert, is a retired ice hockey player who played for Modo Hockey in the 1980s.

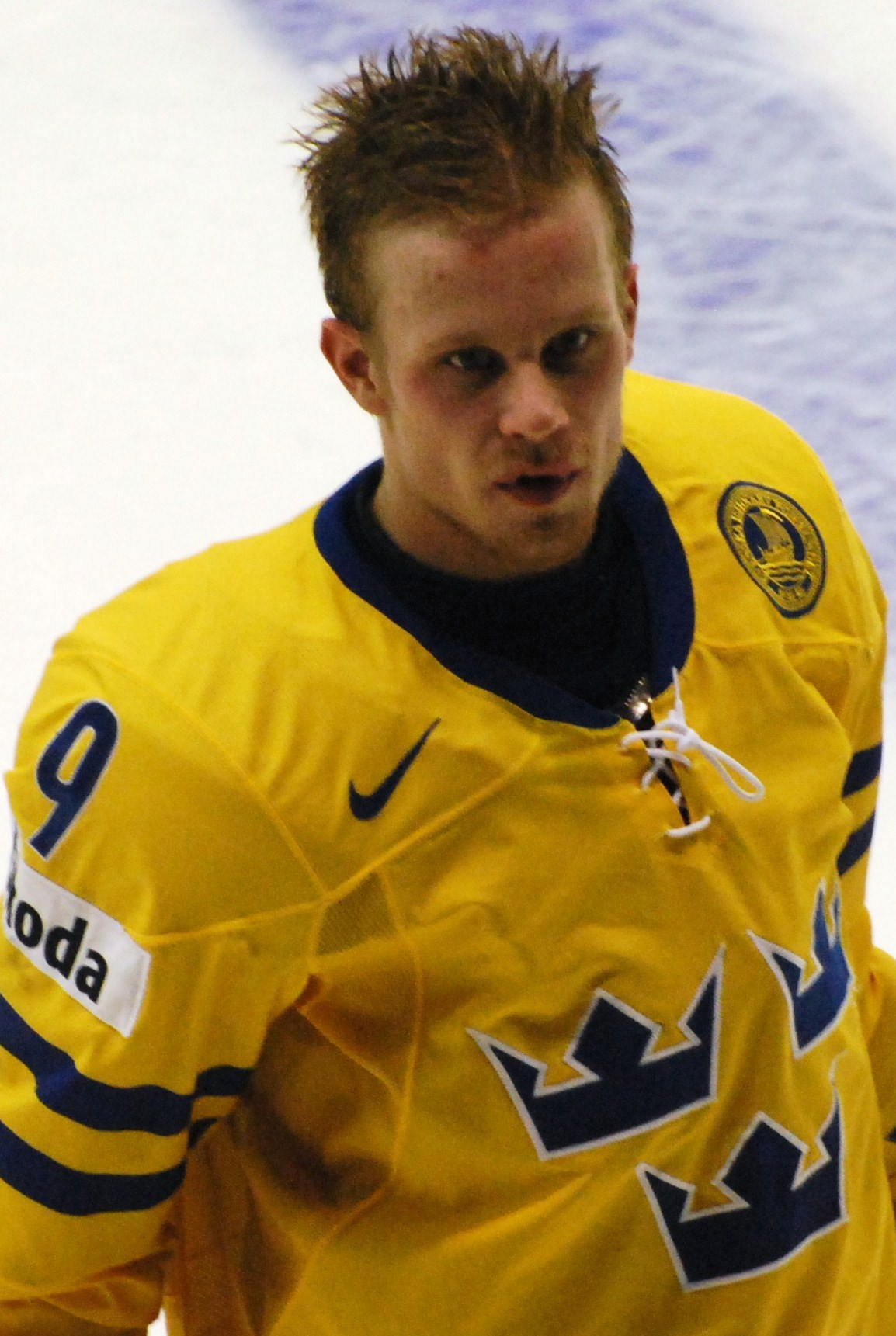
- Tedenby playing for Team Sweden

Medal record

Representing Sweden

Ice hockey

World Championships
Silver medal – second place	2011 Bratislava	

World Junior Championships
Silver medal – second place	2009 Ontario	
Bronze medal – third place	2010 Saskatchewan	

World U18 Championships
Bronze medal – third place	2007 Rauma	

== Career statistics ==
=== Regular season and playoffs ===
			Regular season					Playoffs
Season	Team	League	GP	G	A	Pts	PIM	GP	G	A	Pts	PIM
2005–06	HV71	J18 Allsv	13	8	7	15	24	5	1	0	1	10
2006–07	HV71	J18 Allsv	2	4	0	4	2	5	7	2	9	14
2006–07	HV71	J20	27	10	10	20	43	4	3	1	4	2
2007–08	HV71	J18	1	1	0	1	0	—	—	—	—	—
2007–08	HV71	J20	25	14	16	30	14	2	0	0	0	0
2007–08	HV71	SEL	23	3	3	6	6	5	0	0	0	0
2008–09	HV71	SEL	32	3	1	4	6	18	6	3	9	6
2008–09	IK Oskarshamn	Allsv	13	2	9	11	6	—	—	—	—	—
2009–10	HV71	SEL	44	12	7	19	30	16	2	3	5	6
2010–11	Albany Devils	AHL	12	3	2	5	6	—	—	—	—	—
2010–11	New Jersey Devils	NHL	58	8	14	22	14	—	—	—	—	—
2011–12	New Jersey Devils	NHL	43	1	5	6	16	—	—	—	—	—
2011–12	Albany Devils	AHL	35	6	14	20	22	—	—	—	—	—
2012–13	Albany Devils	AHL	37	10	9	19	12	—	—	—	—	—
2012–13	New Jersey Devils	NHL	4	0	1	1	2	—	—	—	—	—
2013–14	New Jersey Devils	NHL	15	1	0	1	10	—	—	—	—	—
2013–14	Albany Devils	AHL	42	9	13	22	24	4	1	1	2	0
2014–15	HV71	SHL	53	10	9	19	32	6	1	0	1	4
2015–16	HV71	SHL	47	13	19	32	41	4	1	0	1	2
2016–17	HV71	SHL	49	15	16	31	14	16	3	3	6	8
2017–18	HV71	SHL	51	16	10	26	20	2	0	1	1	2
2018–19	HV71	SHL	50	12	20	32	24	9	0	4	4	4
2019–20	HC Davos	NL	48	18	19	37	26	—	—	—	—	—
2020–21	HC Vityaz	KHL	54	17	18	35	30	—	—	—	—	—
2021–22	Dinamo Minsk	KHL	44	13	19	32	24	4	1	1	2	4
2022–23	HV71	SHL	35	3	11	14	10	—	—	—	—	—
2023–24	HV71	SHL	45	4	8	12	12	—	—	—	—	—
2024–25	HV71	SHL	43	6	1	7	18	—	—	—	—	—
SHL totals			472	97	105	202	213	76	13	14	27	32
NHL totals			120	10	20	30	42	—	—	—	—	—
KHL totals			98	30	37	67	54	4	1	1	2	4

=== International ===
Year	Team	Event	Result	GP	G	A	Pts	PIM
2007	Sweden	WJC18	3rd place, bronze medalist(s)	6	2	1	3	4
2007	Sweden	IH18	1st place, gold medalist(s)	4	4	1	5	4
2008	Sweden	WJC18	4th	6	4	4	8	35
2009	Sweden	WJC	2nd place, silver medalist(s)	6	1	4	5	4
2010	Sweden	WJC	3rd place, bronze medalist(s)	5	3	3	6	4
2011	Sweden	WC	2nd place, silver medalist(s)	9	1	2	3	8
Junior totals				27	14	13	27	52
Senior totals				9	1	2	3	8

== Awards and honors ==
Award	Year
SHL
Le Mat Trophy champion	2008, 2010, 2017
International
WJC18 First Team All-Star	2008

Awards and achievements
Preceded by Matt Corrente	New Jersey Devils first-round draft pick 2008	Succeeded by Jacob Josefson
