= Yared Hagos =

Swedish ice hockey player (born 1983)

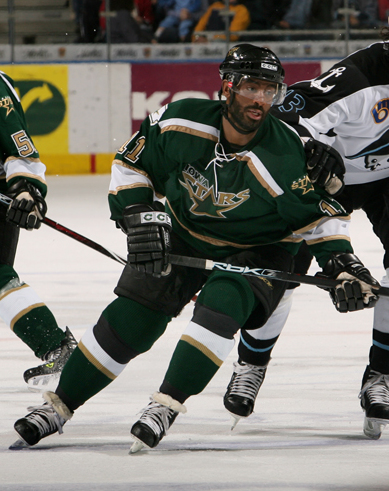
- Hagos with the Iowa Stars in 2007
- Born: 27 March 1983 (age 43) Stockholm, Sweden
- Height: 6 ft 1 in (185 cm)
- Weight: 216 lb (98 kg; 15 st 6 lb)
- Position: Centre
- Shot: Left
- Played for: AIK IF; Timrå IK; Iowa Stars; Mora IK; HV71; Södertälje SK; Skellefteå AIK; Kölner Haie; Krefeld Pinguine; Sheffield Steelers
- NHL draft: 70th overall, 2001; Dallas Stars
- Playing career: 2001–2017

Yared Hagos (born 27 March 1983) is a Swedish retired professional ice hockey centre of Ethiopian heritage. He last competed for the Sheffield Steelers in the Elite Ice Hockey League (EIHL) in the United Kingdom and previously played for the Krefeld Pinguine in Germany's Deutsche Eishockey Liga (DEL).

== Playing career ==
Hagos began his professional hockey career in the 2000–01 season with AIK Hockey in Sweden's top league. After two seasons with AIK, he spent the next two years playing for Timrå IK. Selected by the Dallas Stars in the 2001 NHL Entry Draft as the 70th overall pick, Hagos later played two seasons with the Iowa Stars in the American Hockey League (AHL), where he tallied 44 points over 132 regular-season games.

In the 2007–08 season, he went back to Sweden to join Mora IK. However, following the team's relegation from the Elitserien, he signed a one-year deal with the reigning 2008 Swedish champions, HV71. Midway through the 2008–09 season, he switched teams once more, this time joining Södertälje SK.

During the 2014–15 season, Hagos appeared in just 26 games with AIK before parting ways with the club to join his second team in the German DEL, Krefeld Pinguine, on January 19, 2015. He later agreed to a one-year contract extension with Pinguine on April 24, 2015.

In November 2016, Hagos signed with the Sheffield Steelers, stepping in to fill the vacancy created by the departure of forward Tyler Mosienko. Following the conclusion of the season and after a professional career spanning nearly two decades across multiple countries and leagues, Hagos officially announced his retirement from professional hockey on June 13, 2017.

== Career statistics ==
=== Regular season and playoffs ===
			Regular season					Playoffs
Season	Team	League	GP	G	A	Pts	PIM	GP	G	A	Pts	PIM
1999–2000	AIK	J18 Allsv	8	3	4	7	4	5	1	2	3	2
1999–2000	AIK	J20	17	6	4	10	10	—	—	—	—	—
2000–01	AIK	J20	21	6	13	19	10	5	4	1	5	4
2000–01	AIK	SEL	—	—	—	—	—	5	0	0	0	0
2001–02	AIK	J20	1	0	3	3	2	1	0	2	2	0
2001–02	AIK	SEL	45	4	6	10	36	—	—	—	—	—
2002–03	AIK	J20	1	0	1	1	0	—	—	—	—	—
2002–03	AIK	Allsv	41	9	20	29	51	8	1	2	3	16
2003–04	Timrå IK	SEL	48	9	11	20	75	10	3	1	4	6
2004–05	Timrå IK	SEL	49	6	15	21	38	7	1	0	1	2
2005–06	Iowa Stars	AHL	57	7	15	22	40	—	—	—	—	—
2006–07	Iowa Stars	AHL	75	8	14	22	48	12	1	1	2	16
2007–08	Mora IK	SEL	48	8	13	21	52	—	—	—	—	—
2008–09	HV71	SEL	38	0	2	2	88	—	—	—	—	—
2008–09	Södertälje SK	SEL	15	5	5	10	54	—	—	—	—	—
2009–10	Skellefteå AIK	SEL	53	5	15	20	89	12	4	4	8	10
2010–11	Skellefteå AIK	SEL	51	5	5	10	56	18	1	4	5	16
2011–12	Timrå IK	SEL	46	6	5	11	70	—	—	—	—	—
2012–13	Timrå IK	SEL	45	2	6	8	42	—	—	—	—	—
2013–14	Kölner Haie	DEL	52	7	16	23	72	17	1	0	1	8
2014–15	AIK	Allsv	26	7	10	17	26	—	—	—	—	—
2014–15	Krefeld Pinguine	DEL	12	1	5	6	8	3	0	2	2	2
2015–16	Krefeld Pinguine	DEL	45	2	9	11	46	—	—	—	—	—
2016–17	Sheffield Steelers	EIHL	39	3	12	15	22	4	0	0	0	0
SEL totals			483	50	83	133	600	52	9	9	18	34
AHL totals			132	15	29	44	88	12	1	1	2	16

=== International ===
Year	Team	Event	Result	GP	G	A	Pts	PIM
2001	Sweden	WJC18	7th	6	1	4	5	0
2002	Sweden	WJC	6th	7	1	1	2	4
2003	Sweden	WJC	8th	6	2	3	5	2
Junior totals				19	4	8	12	6
