= David Fredriksson =

Swedish ice hockey player

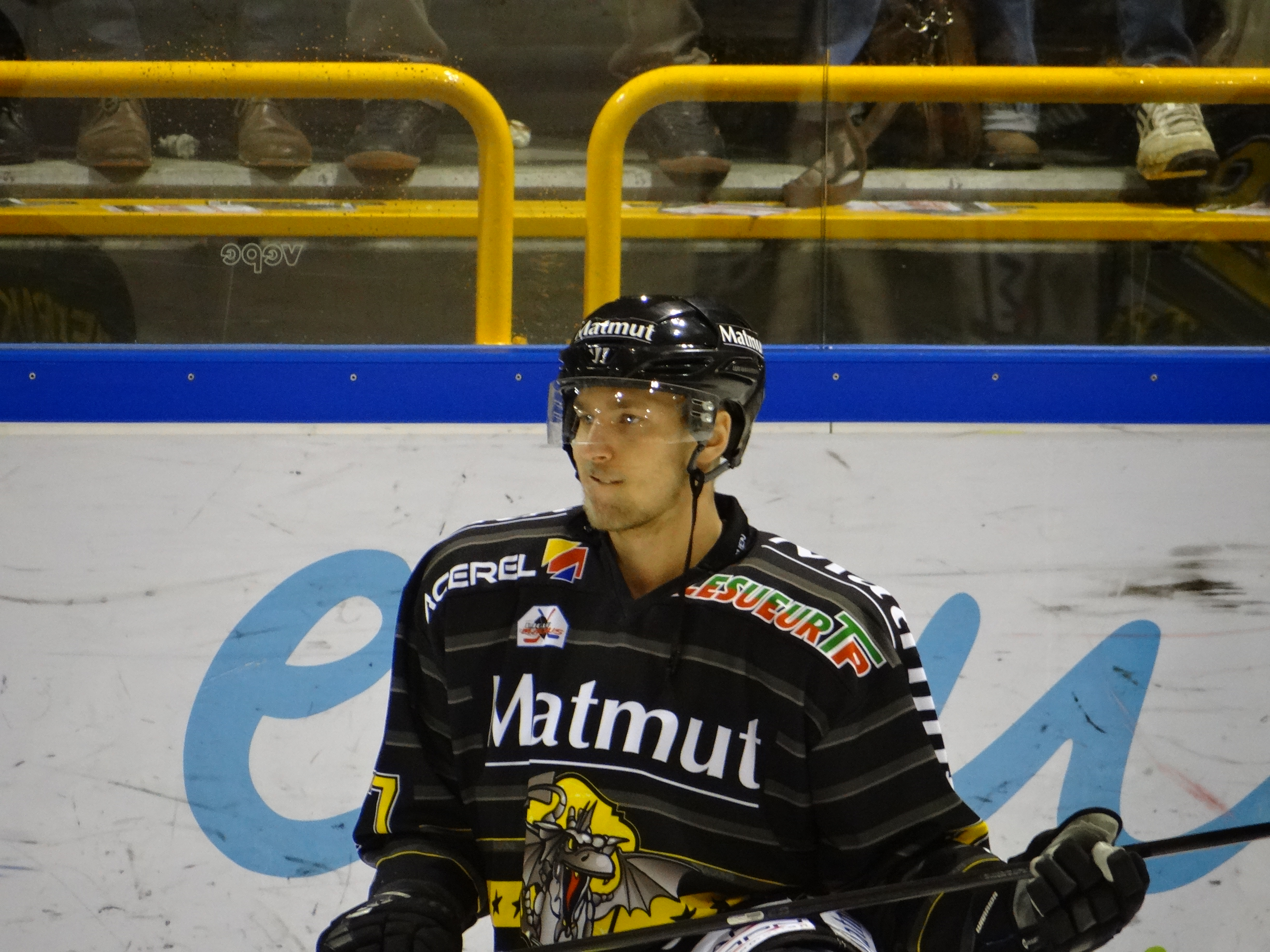
- Born: October 4, 1985 (age 40) Jönköping, Sweden
- Height: 6 ft 3 in (191 cm)
- Weight: 224 lb (102 kg; 16 st 0 lb)
- Position: Winger
- Shot: Left
- Hockeyettan team Former teams: HC Dalen; HV71; Södertälje SK; Tingsryds AIF; Idaho Steelheads; HC Rouen
- NHL draft: 211th overall, 2004; St. Louis Blues
- Playing career: 2002–2019

David Fredriksson (born October 4, 1985, in Jönköping, Sweden) is a Swedish ice hockey player, currently with HV71 in the Swedish elite league Elitserien.

== Playing career ==
Fredriksson, often called "Tuppen" (The Rooster), started his playing career with HV71's youth team in 2001. In season 2005–06 he became a regular in HV71 but has been sidelined by injuries during 2007 and 2008. In late January, 2009, he injured his hand, several tendons severed, when a skate ran over it during a training session. He will be out for the remainder of season 2008–09. He will play for the 2012-2013 season with Dragons de Rouen (France).

Fredriksson has won the Swedish Championship twice, 2004 and 2008, both times with HV71. He was drafted by the St. Louis Blues in the seventh round of the 2004 NHL entry draft, 211th overall.

== Awards ==
- Swedish Champion with HV71 in 2004 and 2008.

== Career statistics ==
=== Regular season and playoffs ===
			Regular season					Playoffs
Season	Team	League	GP	G	A	Pts	PIM	GP	G	A	Pts	PIM
2001–02	HV71	J18 Allsv	14	6	2	8	20	—	—	—	—	—
2002–03	HV71	J18 Allsv	7	2	7	9	12	1	2	0	2	0
2002–03	HV71	J20	20	7	3	10	12	7	8	0	8	10
2002–03	HV71	SEL	1	0	0	0	0	—	—	—	—	—
2003–04	HV71	J20	18	9	3	12	42	2	1	0	1	2
2003–04	HV71	SEL	9	0	0	0	2	6	0	0	0	0
2004–05	HV71	J20	19	8	5	13	48	—	—	—	—	—
2004–05	HV71	SEL	18	0	0	0	0	—	—	—	—	—
2004–05	Mörrums GoIS IK	Allsv	2	1	0	1	2	—	—	—	—	—
2005–06	HV71	J20	4	6	3	9	8	—	—	—	—	—
2005–06	HV71	SEL	37	5	4	9	34	3	0	0	0	4
2006–07	HV71	SEL	12	0	1	1	4	—	—	—	—	—
2006–07	Västerås IK	Allsv	3	0	1	1	2	—	—	—	—	—
2007–08	HV71	J20	2	2	2	4	0	—	—	—	—	—
2007–08	HV71	SEL	6	0	0	0	6	16	2	2	4	10
2008–09	HV71	SEL	34	3	2	5	53	—	—	—	—	—
2009–10	Södertälje SK	SEL	44	3	2	5	61	—	—	—	—	—
2010–11	Tingsryds AIF	Allsv	43	6	9	15	46	—	—	—	—	—
2011–12	Idaho Steelheads	ECHL	45	9	15	24	42	—	—	—	—	—
2012–13	Dragons de Rouen	FRA	19	4	15	19	20	13	1	3	4	12
2013–14	HC Dalen	SWE.4	28	25	63	88	87	12	6	14	20	31
2014–15	HC Dalen	SWE.3	26	7	10	17	55	—	—	—	—	—
2015–16	HC Dalen	SWE.3	32	13	29	42	28	—	—	—	—	—
2016–17	HC Dalen	SWE.3	12	4	4	8	4	—	—	—	—	—
2018–19	HA74	SWE.4	14	11	14	25	10	—	—	—	—	—
SEL totals			161	11	9	20	160	25	2	2	4	14

=== International ===
Year	Team	Event	GP	G	A	Pts	PIM
2003	Sweden	WJC18	6	0	0	0	29
2005	Sweden	WJC	5	1	0	1	20
Junior totals			11	1	0	1	49
