= Henrik Eriksson (ice hockey) =

Swedish ice hockey player

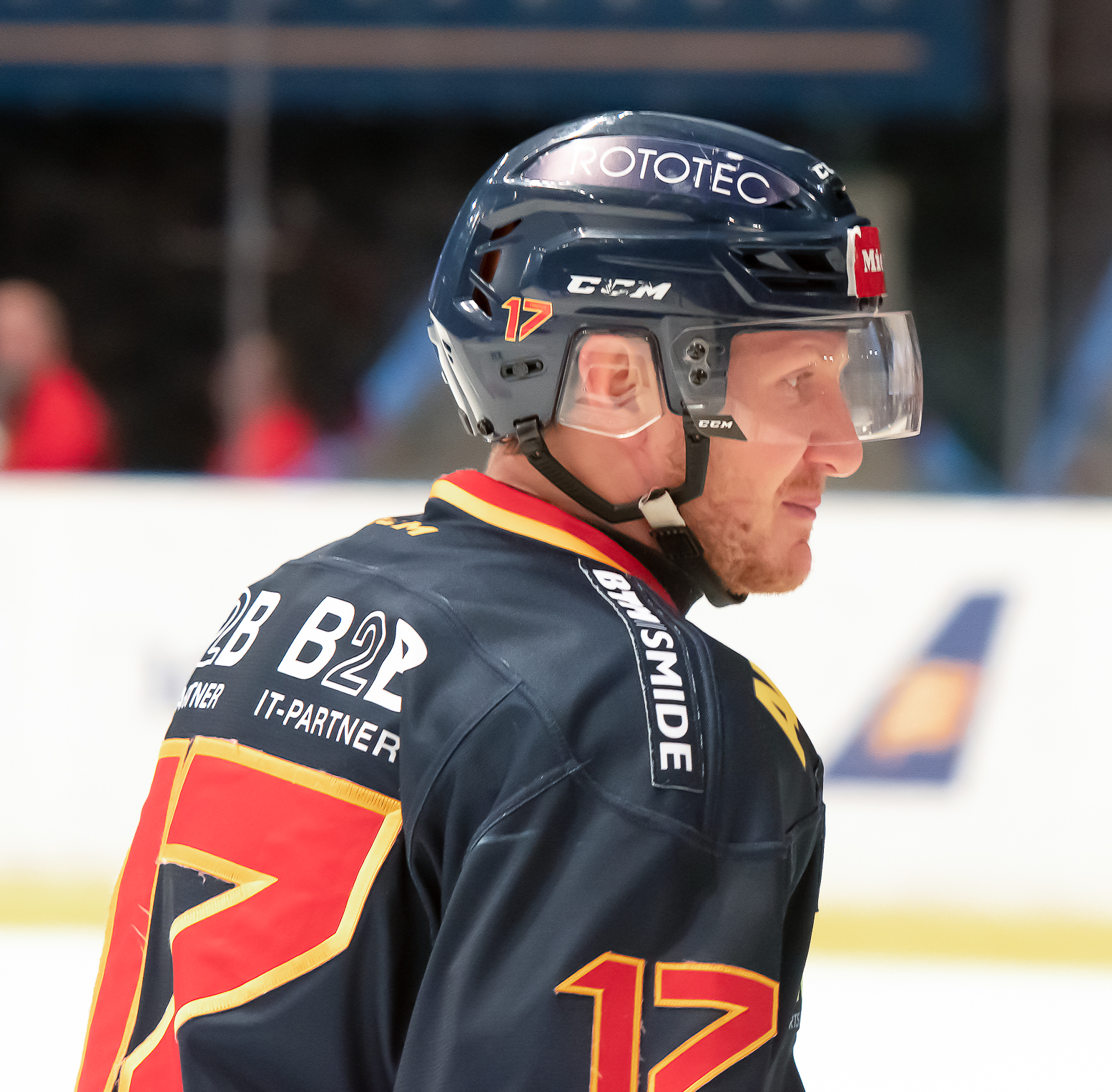
- Born: April 15, 1990 (age 36) Stockholm, Sweden
- Height: 6 ft 0 in (183 cm)
- Weight: 214 lb (97 kg; 15 st 4 lb)
- Position: Right wing
- Shoots: Left
- SHL team: Djurgårdens IF
- Playing career: 2007–present

Henrik Eriksson (born April 15, 1990) is a Swedish professional ice hockey player who is a right winger for Djurgårdens IF of the Swedish Hockey League (SHL). Eriksson previously played for Mora IK in HockeyAllsvenskan. Eriksson played in Djurgården junior teams before making his debut in the senior team.

== Career statistics ==
			Regular season					Playoffs
Season	Team	League	GP	G	A	Pts	PIM	GP	G	A	Pts	PIM
2007–08	Djurgårdens IF	J20	37	8	12	20	45	7	2	0	2	0
2007–08	Djurgårdens IF	SEL	15	0	0	0	0	—	—	—	—	—
2008–09	Djurgårdens IF	J20	15	5	3	8	4	6	1	1	2	0
2008–09	Djurgårdens IF	SEL	47	3	5	8	4	—	—	—	—	—
2009–10	Djurgårdens IF	J20	6	2	4	6	0	—	—	—	—	—
2009–10	Djurgårdens IF	SEL	34	0	4	4	6	—	—	—	—	—
2009–10	Mora IK	Allsv	22	1	5	6	6	2	0	0	0	0
2010–11	Mora IK	Allsv	52	12	10	22	91	10	3	2	5	10
2011–12	Mora IK	Allsv	52	10	9	19	62	—	—	—	—	—
2012–13	Djurgårdens IF	Allsv	52	8	8	16	12	6	1	0	1	0
2013–14	Djurgårdens IF	Allsv	52	8	6	14	43	10	2	1	3	20
2014–15	Djurgårdens IF	SHL	55	8	7	15	12	2	0	0	0	0
2015–16	Djurgårdens IF	SHL	52	1	1	2	16	8	1	0	1	4
2016–17	Djurgårdens IF	SHL	52	0	5	5	12	3	1	0	1	2
2017–18	Djurgårdens IF	SHL	52	7	6	13	8	11	0	0	0	8
2018–19	Djurgårdens IF	SHL	43	6	6	12	6	—	—	—	—	—
2019-20	Djurgårdens IF	SHL	49	6	4	10	22
2020-21	Djurgårdens IF	SHL	52	1	5	6	38	3	0	0	0	4
2021-22	Vaasan Sport	Liiga	59	14	9	23	10
SHL totals			350	25	34	59	70	24	2	0	2	14
