= Björn Melin =

Swedish ice hockey player

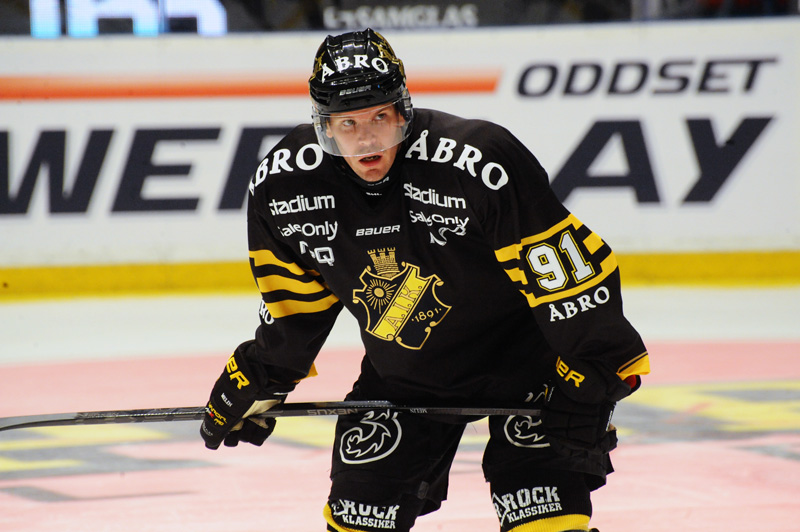
- Born: July 4, 1981 (age 45) Jönköping, Sweden
- Height: 6 ft 2 in (188 cm)
- Weight: 207 lb (94 kg; 14 st 11 lb)
- Position: Left wing
- Shot: Right
- Played for: HV71; Malmö Redhawks; Anaheim Ducks; Neftkhimik Nizhnekamsk; HC Fribourg-Gottéron; Dinamo Riga; Lukko; AIK IF
- National team: Sweden
- NHL draft: 163rd overall, 1999; New York Islanders
- Playing career: 1999–2016

Björn Melin (born July 4, 1981) is a Swedish former professional ice hockey forward, who most notably played with HV71 in the Swedish Hockey League (SHL) and the Anaheim Ducks of the National Hockey League (NHL).

== Playing career ==
Melin played as left winger with jersey number 91. He was an energetic quick power forward who worked hard in every shift. Melin started his hockey career with HC Dalen and has played six of his first seven professional seasons with HV71 in the Swedish Elitserien.

Melin was drafted in the 1999 NHL entry draft by the New York Islanders with their 6th round pick, in the 163rd overall selection. Melin chose not to renew his contract with his last club HV71 in Sweden after the season 2005–06. On May 31, 2006, he signed a one-year contract with the Anaheim Ducks of the NHL. Melin started the season 2006-07 playing for the Portland Pirates in AHL. On January 7 Melin made his NHL debut and scored a goal for Anaheim Ducks against Detroit Red Wings.

After just one season in the AHL and the NHL, Melin returned to his native Sweden for play in Elitserien. In April 2007, he signed a three-year contract with his former club HV71.

Prior to the 2012–13 season, Melin signed a two-year contract with the Stockholm club AIK of the SEL to return to Sweden.

== Career statistics ==
=== Regular season and playoffs ===
			Regular season					Playoffs
Season	Team	League	GP	G	A	Pts	PIM	GP	G	A	Pts	PIM
1997–98	HV71	J20	8	0	3	3	2	—	—	—	—	—
1998–99	HV71	J20	30	12	7	19	50	—	—	—	—	—
1999–00	HV71	J20	23	18	14	32	70	1	1	2	3	0
1999–00	HV71	SEL	23	3	0	3	2	5	0	0	0	0
2000–01	HV71	J20	7	6	2	8	35	3	0	3	3	31
2000–01	HV71	SEL	43	2	1	3	26	—	—	—	—	—
2001–02	HV71	SEL	50	7	9	16	40	8	0	0	0	6
2002–03	HV71	SEL	48	7	9	16	44	7	0	2	2	6
2003–04	HV71	J20	1	1	4	5	2	—	—	—	—	—
2003–04	HV71	SEL	47	7	11	18	28	19	4	8	12	10
2004–05	Malmö Redhawks	SEL	46	9	10	19	22	10	1	2	3	8
2005–06	HV71	SEL	49	16	19	35	48	10	4	1	5	16
2006–07	Portland Pirates	AHL	59	8	14	22	28	—	—	—	—	—
2006–07	Anaheim Ducks	NHL	3	1	0	1	0	—	—	—	—	—
2007–08	HV71	SEL	40	9	10	19	32	12	0	3	3	4
2008–09	HV71	SEL	53	8	31	39	42	18	5	8	13	2
2009–10	HV71	SEL	55	14	22	36	32	11	4	1	5	2
2010–11	Neftekhimik Nizhnekamsk	KHL	14	3	2	5	4	—	—	—	—	—
2010–11	HC Fribourg-Gottéron	NLA	19	10	5	15	2	4	0	1	1	2
2011-12	Dinamo Riga	KHL	11	0	0	0	4	—	—	—	—	—
2011-12	Lukko	SM-l	42	9	15	24	6	3	3	0	3	0
2012–13	AIK IF	SEL	49	7	12	19	16	—	—	—	—	—
2013–14	AIK IF	SHL	25	6	13	19	24	—	—	—	—	—
2014–15	HV71	SHL	42	5	13	18	14	6	0	0	0	0
2015–16	HV71	SHL	9	2	1	3	2	—	—	—	—	—
SHL totals			579	102	161	263	372	106	18	25	43	54
NHL totals			3	1	0	1	0	—	—	—	—	—

Medal record

Representing Sweden

Ice hockey

World Championships
Gold medal – first place	2006 Latvia	

=== International ===
Year	Team	Event	Result	GP	G	A	Pts	PIM
1999	Sweden	WJC18	2nd place, silver medalist(s)	3	1	2	3	2
2000	Sweden	WJC	5th	7	0	3	3	6
2001	Sweden	WJC	4th	7	2	0	2	8
2006	Sweden	WC	1st place, gold medalist(s)	6	0	2	2	0
Junior totals				17	3	5	8	16
Senior totals				6	0	2	2	0

Statistics complete.

== Awards and honors ==
Award	Year
SHL
Le Mat trophy (HV71)	2004, 2008, 2010
