= Johan Halvardsson =

Swedish ice hockey player

- Born: December 26, 1979 (age 46) Jönköping, Sweden
- Height: 6 ft 3.5 in (192 cm)
- Weight: 206 lb (93 kg; 14 st 10 lb)
- Position: Defence
- Shot: Left
- Played for: HV71; Bridgeport Sound Tigers
- NHL draft: 102nd overall, 1999; New York Islanders
- Playing career: 1998–2009

Johan Halvardsson (born December 26, 1979) is a Swedish retired ice hockey player who played over 200 games for his hometown team HV71 in the Swedish Elitserien. He retired in 2009 due to recurring injuries.

Halvardsson was a big defenceman who often used his great size and strength for blocking shots, tackling and clearing pucks from the crease, often used on the penalty kill.

== Playing career ==
Halvardsson was drafted in the 1999 NHL entry draft by the New York Islanders with their fourth choice, the 102nd overall selection. On May 15, 2006, Halvardsson signed a two-year contract, beginning season 2006–07, with the New York Islanders. He struggled in Islanders' affiliated club Bridgeport Sound Tigers in AHL with only eight games played. On December 1, 2006, he broke his contract and returned to Sweden, signing a one-year contract with his former Swedish club HV71. He later extended his contract with HV71 for another four years.

On June 12, 2009, Halvardsson announced his retirement from hockey due to knee problems. He will take a position as video coach with HV71.

== International play ==
Halvardsson has played for Sweden in the 1999 World Junior Championships.

== Career statistics ==
=== Regular season and playoffs ===
			Regular season					Playoffs
Season	Team	League	GP	G	A	Pts	PIM	GP	G	A	Pts	PIM
1998–99	HV71	SEL	17	1	2	3	33	—	—	—	—	—
1999–00	HV71	SEL	46	0	3	3	75	5	0	0	0	8
2000–01	HV71	SEL	33	0	0	0	24	—	—	—	—	—
2001–02	HV71	SEL	3	0	0	0	0	—	—	—	—	—
2002–03	HV71	SEL	39	0	1	1	14	7	0	0	0	0
2003–04	HV71	SEL	11	0	4	4	39	17	1	3	4	41
2003–04	IK Oskarshamn	Swe-2	32	3	4	7	94	—	—	—	—	—
2004–05	HV71	SEL	36	2	3	5	46	—	—	—	—	—
2005–06	HV71	SEL	37	1	1	2	34	10	0	0	0	8
2006–07	Bridgeport Sound Tigers	AHL	8	1	1	2	8	—	—	—	—	—
2006–07	HV71	SEL	8	0	1	1	10	—	—	—	—	—
2007–08	HV71	SEL	9	0	1	1	2	6	0	0	0	0
2008–09	HV71	SEL	1	0	0	0	0	—	—	—	—	—
SEL totals			240	4	16	20	277	45	1	3	4	57

=== International ===
Year	Team	Event	Result	GP	G	A	Pts	PIM
1999	Sweden Jr.	WJC	4th	6	0	0	0	4
Junior totals				6	0	0	0	4
