= Christoffer Bengtsberg =

Swedish ice hockey player

- Born: 1 November 1989 (age 36) Stockholm, Sweden
- Height: 5 ft 11 in (180 cm)
- Weight: 176 lb (80 kg; 12 st 8 lb)
- Position: Goaltender
- Catches: Left
- GET team Former teams: Lillehammer IK; HV71; Brynäs IF
- NHL draft: Undrafted
- Playing career: 2007–present

Christoffer Bengtsberg (born 1 November 1989) is a Swedish professional ice hockey goaltender. He is presently an active player for Lillehammer IK of the Norwegian GET-ligaen.

Bengtsberg made his Elitserien debut playing with HV71 during the 2008–09 Elitserien season.

After finishing the 2014–15 season with Södertälje SK in the HockeyAllsvenskan, Bengtsberg opted to pursue a North American career, signing a one-year ECHL contract with the Evansville IceMen on 6 August 2015.
