= Teemu Laine =

Finnish ice hockey player

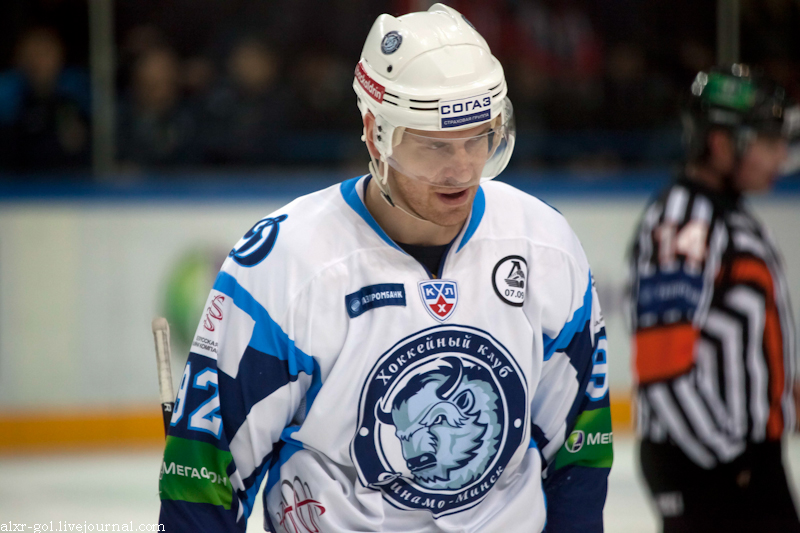
- Born: August 9, 1982 (age 42); Helsinki, Finland
- Height: 6 ft 0 in (183 cm)
- Weight: 203 lb (92 kg; 14 st 7 lb)
- Position: Right wing
- Shot: Left
- Played for: Jokerit; Tappara; HC TPS; HV71; HC Dinamo Minsk; HC Donbass
- National team: Finland
- NHL draft: 39th overall, 2000; New Jersey Devils
- Playing career: 1999–2017

Teemu Laine (born August 9, 1982) is a Finnish former professional ice hockey player. He last played with HV71 in the Swedish Hockey League (SHL). He played in his sixth and final season with the club in 2016–17, in which they captured the Le Mat trophy. He retired from hockey due to knee injuries.

== Awards and honors ==
Award	Year
Liiga
Champion (Jokerit)	2002
SHL
Le Mat trophy (HV71)	2010, 2017

== Career statistics ==
=== Regular season and playoffs ===
			Regular season					Playoffs
Season	Team	League	GP	G	A	Pts	PIM	GP	G	A	Pts	PIM
1998–99	Jokerit	FIN U18	28	20	17	37	81	6	0	2	2	6
1998–99	Jokerit	FIN U20	1	0	0	0	2	—	—	—	—	—
1999–2000	Jokerit	FIN U18	5	3	4	7	8	—	—	—	—	—
1999–2000	Jokerit	FIN U20	23	5	9	14	42	10	5	4	9	10
1999–2000	Jokerit	SM-liiga	14	1	1	2	8	—	—	—	—	—
2000–01	Jokerit	FIN U20	4	1	2	3	18	1	0	0	0	0
2000–01	Jokerit	SM-liiga	25	3	2	5	10	5	1	0	1	2
2000–01	Kiekko–Vantaa	Mestis	18	2	4	6	30	—	—	—	—	—
2001–02	Jokerit	FIN U20	8	9	5	14	50	—	—	—	—	—
2001–02	Jokerit	SM-liiga	38	0	1	1	45	7	0	0	0	2
2001–02	Kiekko–Vantaa	Mestis	9	6	4	10	4	—	—	—	—	—
2002–03	Jokerit	SM-liiga	53	7	5	12	56	9	1	1	2	2
2003–04	Jokerit	SM-liiga	56	5	8	13	50	8	1	1	2	2
2004–05	Tappara	SM-liiga	53	7	10	17	60	5	0	1	1	14
2005–06	Tappara	SM-liiga	55	6	11	17	68	6	4	0	4	8
2006–07	Tappara	SM-liiga	54	6	24	30	136	5	1	1	2	10
2007–08	TPS	SM-liiga	51	17	28	45	68	2	0	2	2	2
2008–09	HV71	SEL	55	14	15	29	90	17	2	3	5	32
2009–10	HV71	SEL	45	15	14	29	122	16	5	8	13	12
2010–11	HV71	SEL	44	21	9	30	36	4	0	0	0	4
2011–12	Dinamo Minsk	KHL	54	20	22	42	48	1	0	0	0	2
2012–13	Dinamo Minsk	KHL	50	17	18	35	58	—	—	—	—	—
2013–14	Donbass Donetsk	KHL	54	12	13	25	58	—	—	—	—	—
2014–15	HV71	SHL	50	11	13	24	94	6	1	2	3	2
2015–16	HV71	SHL	15	7	5	12	22	—	—	—	—	—
2016–17	HV71	SHL	15	2	1	3	22	—	—	—	—	—
SM-liiga totals			399	52	90	142	501	47	8	6	14	42
SHL totals			224	70	57	127	386	43	8	13	21	50
KHL totals			158	49	53	102	142	1	0	0	0	2

=== International ===
Year	Team	Event	GP	G	A	Pts	PIM
2000	Finland	WJC	7	1	0	1	6
2000	Finland	WJC18	7	1	4	5	8
Junior totals			14	2	4	6	14
