= Stefan Liv =

Polish-born Swedish ice hockey player (1980–2011)

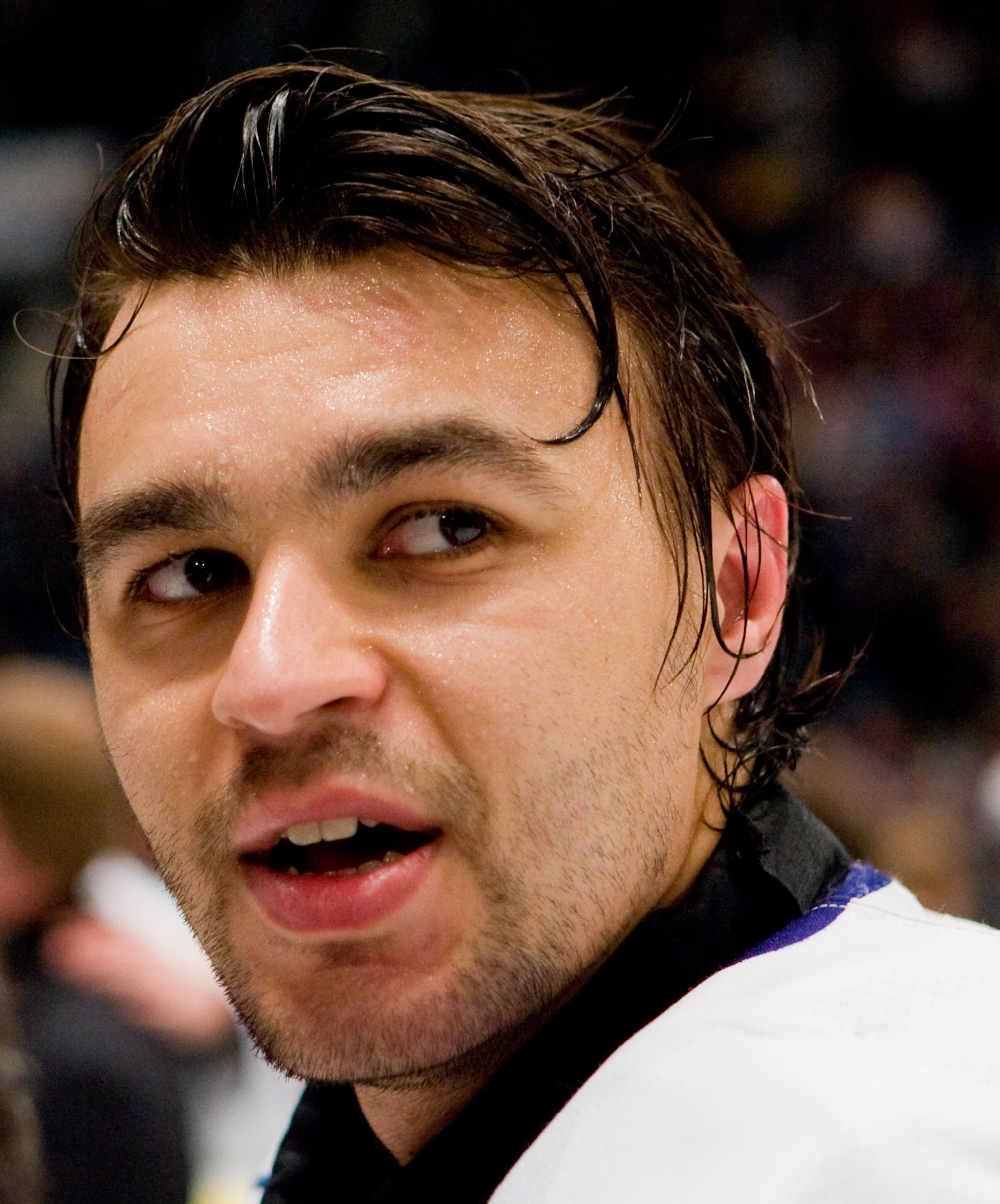
- Stefan Liv following HV71 winning the Swedish National Championship in April 2010
- Born: 21 December 1980 Gdynia, Poland
- Died: 7 September 2011 (aged 30) Yaroslavl, Russia
- Height: 6 ft 0 in (183 cm)
- Weight: 185 lb (84 kg; 13 st 3 lb)
- Position: Goaltender
- Caught: Left
- Played for: HV71; Sibir Novosibirsk
- National team: Sweden
- NHL draft: 102nd overall, 2000; Detroit Red Wings
- Playing career: 1999–2011

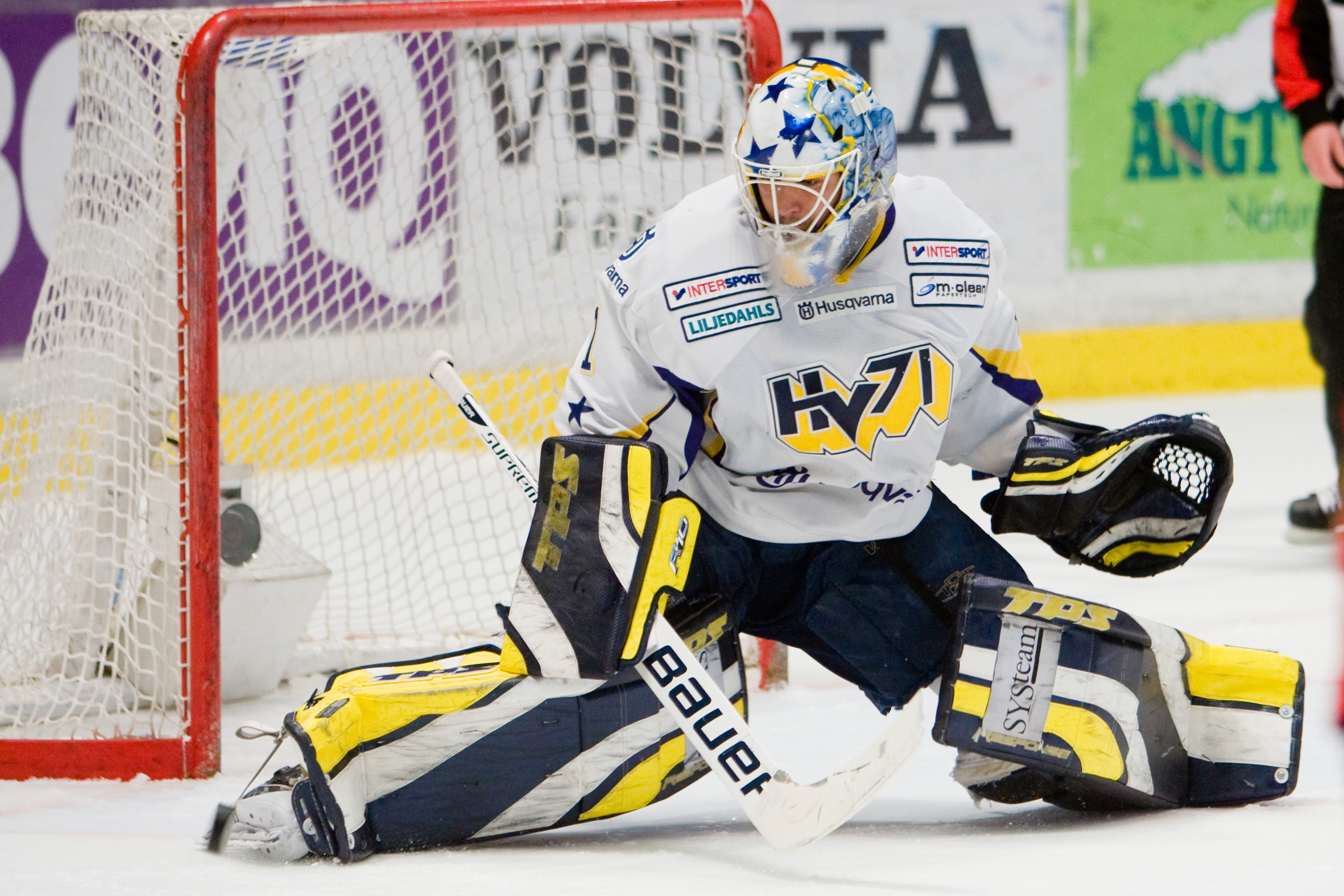
Liv playing for HV71 in 2010

Stefan Daniel Patryk Liv (born Patryk Śliż; 21 December 1980 – 7 September 2011) was a Swedish professional ice hockey player who played as a goaltender. Liv played professionally in Sweden, North America and Russia. Liv played nine seasons for HV71 in the top-tier league in Sweden. He was drafted by the Detroit Red Wings in the 2000 NHL entry draft and played one season elsewhere in the Red Wings organization, but never played in the National Hockey League (NHL). He then returned to Europe and HV71, where he played three seasons before moving to Russia in 2010.

Liv was a member of Lokomotiv Yaroslavl of the Kontinental Hockey League (KHL) when he died, along with the rest of the team in the 2011 Lokomotiv Yaroslavl plane crash. He was a member of several Swedish national teams, including the 2006 Olympic championship team. A street in Jönköping was named "Stefan Livs gata" (English: Stefan Liv's street) in his honour on 2 August 2013.

== Early life ==
Liv was born in Gdynia, Poland, as Patryk Śliż, given to an orphanage in Gdańsk and adopted by a Swedish family around the age of two. He kept his original first name as a third given name.

== Playing career ==
Liv was the starting goaltender for HC Sibir and was often chosen for the Swedish national team. On 22 December 2005, he was named as third goaltender to Team Sweden for the 2006 Winter Olympics. He wore the goaltender's glove on his left hand. He was agile, quick in moving from side to side and skilled with close-range shots, and his unorthodox style reminded some of Dominik Hašek.

Liv played his first Elitserien game in Sweden on 18 January 2000 in Jönköping for HV71 against Luleå HF. His first national appearance was in a match against the Czech Republic, also in Jönköping, on 9 November 2000. Liv was drafted in the 2000 NHL entry draft by the Detroit Red Wings in the third round, 102nd overall.

Liv signed a one-year contract with the Red Wings in May 2006, but started season 2006–07 playing for the Grand Rapids Griffins of the American Hockey League (AHL). He was recalled by the Red Wings on 17 November 2006. On 26 November 2006, Liv was back with the Grand Rapids Griffins playing against Houston Aeros. Two days later, Liv was assigned to the Toledo Storm in ECHL when the Grand Rapids Griffins recalled goalie Logan Koopmans. He was later recalled by Grand Rapids Griffins.

After one season with the Detroit Red Wings' organization playing mostly for Grand Rapids, totaling a save percentage of .895 over 34 games, Liv signed a three-year contract with his former Swedish club HV71. He continued the 2007–08 season by winning the Swedish Championship and was awarded the Guldpucken as the Player of the Year in the Elitserien. During the 2009–10 season Liv played again at HV71, and he was selected to Sweden's Olympic team for the 2010 Winter Olympics in Vancouver, where he was the third goalie after New York Rangers' Henrik Lundqvist and Toronto Maple Leafs' Jonas Gustavsson. In 2010–11 Liv played for Sibir Novosibirsk in the KHL, and was selected to the 2011 KHL All-star game. For the 2011–12 season, Liv moved to Lokomotiv Yaroslavl.

== Death ==
On 7 September 2011, Liv was killed when a Yakovlev Yak-42 passenger aircraft, carrying nearly his entire Lokomotiv team, crashed just outside Yaroslavl, Russia. The team was traveling to Minsk to play their opening game of the season, with its coaching staff and prospects. Lokomotiv officials said "everyone from the main roster was on the plane plus four players from the youth team."

As a result of Liv's death, the premier round games of the 2011–12 Elitserien season, between 13–15 September, began with a one-minute silence. In honour, his No. 1 jersey was retired and raised to the rafters by HV71 in Kinnarps Arena prior to HV71's home game against Timrå IK on 10 January 2012. To remember Liv throughout the 2011–12 season, all player jerseys in HV71's team carried number 1 on the front. On 10 September 2011, over 10,000 fans of HV71 attended Kinnarps Arena, HV71's home arena, to honour Stefan Liv.

In their 2011–12 season opener, each member of the Detroit Red Wings wore a patch bearing "BM*RS*SL" to honour the memories of Liv, Lokomotiv coach Brad McCrimmon, and defenseman Ruslan Salei. Detroit goalie Jimmy Howard also paid a personal tribute to the three men on the back of his mask. Liv and Howard had shared goaltending duties during Liv's season with the Grand Rapids Griffins.

Liv's body was buried at the Sofiakyrkan church in Jönköping on 2 October 2011, with 120 friends and relatives arriving at the scene and leaving one rose flower each on Liv's coffin.

From the 2012–13 season onward, the Swedish Hockey League's playoff MVP award is known as the Stefan Liv Memorial Trophy in honour of Liv. On 2 August 2013, a new street in Jönköping leading to Kinnarps Arena was named "Stefan Livs gata" (English: Stefan Liv's street).

On 20 October 2013, Detroit Red Wings defenseman Jonathan Ericsson named his newborn daughter Liv Ericsson in honour of Stefan, who was a close friend.

== International play ==
Medal record

Representing Sweden

Olympic Games
Gold medal – first place	2006 Turin	

World Championships
Gold medal – first place	2006 Latvia	
Silver medal – second place	2004 Czech Republic	
Bronze medal – third place	2002 Sweden	
Bronze medal – third place	2009 Switzerland	

Elitserien
Gold medal – first place	2004	
Gold medal – first place	2008	
Gold medal – first place	2010	
Silver medal – second place	2009	

Liv played for Sweden in:

- 2002 World Championships (bronze medal)
- 2004 World Championships (silver medal)
- 2005 World Championships
- 2006 Winter Olympics (gold medal)
- 2006 World Championships (gold medal)
- 2008 World Championships
- 2009 World Championships (bronze medal)
- 2010 Winter Olympics

== Awards ==
- Nominated to the Elitserien Rookie of the Year in 2001.
- Named to the Elitserien All-Star Game in 2002.
- Bronze medal at the Ice Hockey World Championships in 2002.
- Awarded the Honken Trophy (Swedish Goaltender of the Year) in 2002.
- Silver medal at the Ice Hockey World Championships in 2004.
- Elitserien playoff winner with HV71 in 2004, 2008 and 2010.
- Gold medal at the Winter Olympics in 2006.
- Gold medal at the Ice Hockey World Championship in 2006.
- Awarded Guldpucken (Swedish Player of the Year) in 2008.
- Named to the Swedish All-Star Team in 2008.
- Elitserien playoff silver medal with HV71 in 2009.
- Bronze medal at the Ice Hockey World Championships in 2009.

== Records ==
- Elitserien record for shutouts in playoffs (5) — (four during the finals)
- Elitserien record for career shutouts (37)
- HV71's club record for total minutes played (13,231)
- HV71's club record for shutouts in a season (6)
- HV71's club record for career GAA (2.17)

== Career statistics ==
=== Regular season ===
Season	Team	League	GP	W	L	T	MIN	GA	SO	GAA
1999–00	HV71	SEL	12				716	25	0	2.09
2000–01	HV71	SEL	46				2,752	127	4	2.77
2001–02	HV71	SEL	38				2,184	95	4	2.61
2002–03	HV71	SEL	46				2,723	124	3	2.73
2003–04	HV71	SEL	41				2,451	91	6	2.23
2004–05	HV71	SEL	40				2,404	119	2	2.97
2005–06	HV71	SEL	40				2,406	87	4	2.17
2006–07	Grand Rapids Griffins	AHL	34	15	15	0	1,893	95	2	3.01
2006–07	Toledo Storm	ECHL	3	1	1	1	184	7	0	2.29
2007–08	HV71	SEL	48	26	11	11	2,785	105	5	2.26
2008–09	HV71	SEL	35	15	9	11	2,001	86	1	2.58
2009–10	HV71	SEL	43				2,542	110	4	2.60
2010–11	HC Sibir	KHL	39	19	16	2	2,276	84	4	2.21
SEL totals			389				22,964	969	33	2.49
KHL totals			39	19	16	2	2,276	84	4	2.21
ECHL totals			3	1	1	1	184	7	0	2.29
AHL totals			34	15	15	0	1,893	95	2	3.01

Statistics as of the end of the Elitserien regular season 2008–09.

=== Postseason ===
Season	Team	League	GP	W	L	T	MIN	GA	SO	GAA
1999–00	HV71	SEL	3	1	2	0	178	12	0	4.04
2001–02	HV71	SEL	8	4	4	0	517	27	0	3.13
2002–03	HV71	SEL	7	3	4	0	391	17	1	2.61
2003–04	HV71	SEL	18	12	6	0	1,091	35	5	1.92
2005–06	HV71	SEL	12	7	5	0	668	38	0	3.41
2007–08	HV71	SEL	17	12	5	0	1,020	31	3	1.82
2008–09	HV71	SEL	18	9	8	0	1,111	35	1	1.89
SEL totals			83	48	34	0	4,976	195	10	2.48

Statistics as of the end of Elitserien playoffs 2009.

=== International ===
Year	Team	Event	GP	W	L	T	MIN	GA	SO	GAA
2002	Sweden	WC	2	2	0	0	120	3	1	1.50
2004	Sweden	WC	1	1	0	0	60	1	0	1.00
2005	Sweden	WC	0	—	—	—	—	—	—	—
2006	Sweden	Oly	1	1	0	0	60	2	0	2.00
2006	Sweden	WC	1	1	0	0	60	0	1	0.00
2008	Sweden	WC	3	1	2	0	178	6	1	2.02
2009	Sweden	WC	3	2	1	0	185	8	0	2.59
2010	Sweden	Oly	0	—	—	—	—	—	—	—
Senior int'l totals			8	6	2	0	478	12	3	1.51

Statistics as of 17 May 2008.

== See also ==
- List of ice hockey players who died during their playing career

Preceded by Per Svartvadet	Guldpucken; 2008	Succeeded by Jonas Gustavsson
