= 2009–10 Elitserien season =

- League: Elitserien
- Sport: Ice hockey
- Duration: September 21, 2009 – March 13, 2010
- Total attendance: 2,049,408 (regular season); 315,291 (playoffs)
- Average attendance: 6,210 (regular season); 7,882 (playoffs)

Regular season
- League champion: HV71
- Season MVP: Magnus Johansson (Linköpings HC)
- Top scorer: Mats Zuccarello (Modo Hockey)

Playoffs
- Playoffs MVP: Johan Davidsson (HV71)

Finals
- Champions: HV71
- Runners-up: Djurgårdens IF

SHL seasons
- ← 2008–09 2010–11 →

The 2009–10 Elitserien season was the 35th season of Elitserien. It started on September 21, 2009, and ended on March 13, 2010. The playoffs started on March 18, 2010, and ended on April 24, 2010. HV71 won the playoffs, beating Timrå IK 4–1 in the quarter final series, Skellefteå AIK 4–1 in the semifinal series, and Djurgårdens IF 4–2 in the final series. The season had a mid-season break that started on February 9 and ended on February 26 to allow participation of Elitserien players in the 2010 Winter Olympics in Vancouver.

In Kvalserien, Södertälje SK requalified and AIK qualified for the 2010–11 Elitserien season at the expense of Rögle BK.

== League business ==
=== Rule changes ===
Elitserien will bring in a number of rule changes for the start of the 2009–10 Elitserien season aimed at increasing offence. Two rule changes are to Rule 440 on faceoffs. Firstly, the first faceoff of a power play will now be in the defending zone of the team that committed the foul, regardless of where the play was stopped. Secondly, a faceoff will always be located at one of the nine faceoff spots. In previous seasons a faceoff could have been located anywhere on the rink.

=== Referees ===
For the 2009–10 Elitserien season around 100 matches will be refereed by four referees. Also, the referees uniforms will change to the classical black striped shirts with a number on the back instead of the referee's name, as in previous seasons.

=== Season schedule ===
Each team will play each other five times during the regular season. Due to play in the Champions Hockey League and matches against two NHL teams, Färjestads BK's and Linköpings HC's matches in round 4 are played out of the schedule. After the initial season schedule have changes been made for rounds 3, 6, 13, 16 and 38.

=== General managers' meeting ===
The general managers of the 12 elite league clubs in Elitserien met on June 9, 2009, and agreed on creating a jointly owned development company that will focus its work on the development of elite ice hockey in Sweden. The company's executive officer is Håkan Loob who will put is work in Färjestads BK on hold. It was also decided that the elite clubs will produce a new shareholder deal for the Swedish hockey league, Svenska Hockeyligan AB (SHL), as the current deal expires on April 30, 2010. The clubs will participate in the current league system for seasons 2009–10 and 2010–11.

=== Outdoor game ===
On December 28, 2009, Frölunda HC and Färjestads BK played their round 33 game outdoors at Ullevi Stadium in Gothenburg. The match organizers' goal was to break the previous outdoor game spectator record from 1962 where 23,192 spectators attended a match between Frölunda HC and Djurgårdens IF at Ullevi. In the 2009 match, the boards of the rink were completely transparent and Frölunda HC played in jerseys looking as the jerseys from 1962, void of advertisements. 31,144 spectators watched the game.

== Regular season ==
=== Standings ===
Elitserien	GP	W	L	T	OTW	OTL	GF	GA	Pts
y – HV71	55	25	16	5	6	3	188	155	95
x – Djurgårdens IF	55	26	17	7	2	3	161	130	92
x – Linköpings HC	55	27	20	3	3	2	163	139	92
x – Skellefteå AIK	55	26	20	4	1	4	146	141	88
x – Färjestads BK	55	25	20	3	2	5	132	144	87
x – Brynäs IF	55	20	17	11	6	1	144	124	84
x – Frölunda HC	55	22	22	9	1	1	155	156	78
x – Timrå IK	55	18	19	8	3	7	138	150	75
e – Modo Hockey	55	16	20	8	7	4	161	150	74
e – Luleå HF	55	19	23	2	4	7	139	143	74
r – Södertälje SK	55	14	27	4	7	3	131	176	63
r – Rögle BK	55	13	30	2	4	6	127	173	55

x – clinched playoff spot; y – clinched regular season league title; e – eliminated from playoff contention; r – played in relegation series

=== Statistical leaders ===
==== Scoring leaders ====
GP = Games played; G = Goals; A = Assists; Pts = Points; +/– = Plus/minus; PIM = Penalty minutes

Player	Team	GP	G	A	Pts	+/–	PIM
(Norway) Mats Zuccarello Aasen	Modo Hockey	55	23	41	64	+6	62
(Sweden) Tony Mårtensson	Linköpings HC	55	19	44	63	+8	26
(Sweden) Johan Davidsson	HV71	55	12	46	58	+21	18
(Sweden) David Petrasek	HV71	52	15	38	53	+17	101
(Czech Republic) Jan Hlaváč	Linköpings HC	38	30	21	51	+15	24
(Sweden) Marcus Nilson	Djurgårdens IF	53	24	27	51	+25	32
(Sweden) Linus Klasen	Södertälje SK	51	19	32	51	-14	20
(Czech Republic) Jaroslav Hlinka	Linköpings HC	41	13	37	50	+11	12
(Sweden) Magnus Johansson	Linköpings HC	52	8	41	49	+5	14
(Finland) Eero Somervuori	Brynäs IF	55	19	25	44	0	18

As of the end of the regular season.

==== Leading goaltenders ====
GP = Games played; TOI = Time on ice (minutes); GA = Goals against; SO = Shutouts; Sv% = Save percentage; GAA = Goals against average

Player	Team	GP	TOI	GA	SO	Sv%	GAA
(Sweden) Jacob Markström	Brynäs IF	43	2,542:03	85	5	.927	2.01
(Sweden) Gustaf Wesslau	Djurgårdens IF	32	1,836:10	70	2	.917	2.29
(Sweden) Stefan Ridderwall	Djurgårdens IF	26	1,488:02	57	0	.916	2.30
(Sweden) Andreas Hadelöv	Skellefteå AIK	50	2,954:47	117	4	.912	2.38
(Sweden) Henrik Karlsson	Färjestads BK	34	1,933:58	79	3	.913	2.45
(Sweden) Anders Lindbäck	Timrå IK	42	2,536:33	104	3	.912	2.46
(Sweden) Mattias Modig	Luleå HF	34	1,925:08	80	2	.899	2.49
(Finland) Fredrik Norrena	Linköpings HC	45	2,550:36	106	3	.907	2.49
(Sweden) Niklas Svedberg	Modo Hockey	32	1,898:34	82	1	.900	2.59
(Sweden) Stefan Liv	HV71	43	2,542:05	110	4	.908	2.60

As of the end of the regular season.

=== Attendance ===
#	Team	Home			Away			Total		
#	Team	GP	Total	Average	GP	Total	Average	GP	Total	Average
1	Frölunda HC	28	319,189	11,399	27	156,182	5,784	55	475,371	8,643
2	Djurgårdens IF	27	189,920	7,034	28	176,539	6,304	55	366,459	6,662
3	HV 71	28	194,293	6,939	27	173,276	6,417	55	367,569	6,683
4	Linköpings HC	28	193,177	6,899	27	152,502	5,648	55	345,679	6,285
5	Färjestads BK	28	189,961	6,784	27	196,351	7,272	55	386,312	7,023
6	MODO Hockey	28	179,366	6,405	27	180,429	6,682	55	359,795	6,541
7	Brynäs	27	154,932	5,738	28	174,996	6,249	55	329,928	5,998
8	Luleå HF	28	149,316	5,332	27	167,508	6,204	55	316,824	5,760
9	Timrå IK	27	136,389	5,051	28	169,637	6,058	55	306,026	5,564
10	Skellefteå AIK	27	132,092	4,892	28	168,293	6,010	55	300,385	5,461
11	Rögle BK	27	112,377	4,162	28	162,661	5,809	55	275,038	5,000
12	Södertälje SK	27	98,396	3,644	28	171,034	6,108	55	269,430	4,898
League		330	2,049,408	6,210						

== Playoffs ==
After the regular season, the standard of 8 teams qualify for the playoffs. HV71 won the regular season title with 95 points.

1. HV71 – Regular season champions, 95 points
2. Djurgårdens IF – 92 points (+31 goals for)
3. Linköpings HC – 92 points (+24 goals for)
4. Skellefteå AIK – 88 points
5. Färjestads BK – 87 points
6. Brynäs IF – 84 points
7. Frölunda HC – 78 points
8. Timrå IK – 75 points

=== Playoff bracket ===
In the first round, the highest remaining seed chooses which of the two lowest remaining seeds to be matched against. In the second round, the highest remaining seed is matched against the lowest remaining seed. In each round the higher-seeded team is awarded home ice advantage. Each best-of-seven series follows a 1–1–1–2–1–1 format: the higher-seeded team will play at home for games 2 and 4 (plus 5 and 7 if necessary), and the lower-seeded team will be at home for game 1, 3 and 6 (if necessary).

Quarterfinals
1	HV71	4
8	Timrå IK	1
4	Skellefteå AIK	4
5	Färjestads BK	3
(Pairings are reseeded after the first round)
2	Djurgårdens IF	4
6	Brynäs IF	1
3	Linköpings HC	4
7	Frölunda HC	3

Semifinals
1	HV71	4
4	Skellefteå AIK	1
2	Djurgårdens IF	4
3	Linköpings HC	1

Finals
1	HV71	4
2	Djurgårdens IF	2

Swedish Champions
2009–10
HV71
Fourth Title

==== Quarterfinals ====
Quarterfinals 2009/2010

Round 1
Day	Date	Home team	Away team	Arena	Spectators	Results	Sudden death	Score
Thursday	March 18, 2010	Timrå IK	HV71	E.ON Arena	5 512	2 - 3	SD	0 - 1
Thursday	March 18, 2010	Brynäs IF	Djurgårdens IF	Läkerol Arena	7 251	3 - 4		0 - 1
Thursday	March 18, 2010	Frölunda HC	Linköpings HC	Scandinavium	9 299	4 - 3	SD	1 - 0
Thursday	March 18, 2010	Färjestads BK	Skellefteå AIK	Löfbergs Lila Arena	5 496	2 - 3		0 - 1

Round 2
Day	Date	Home team	Away team	Arena	Spectators	Results	Sudden death	Score
Saturday	March 20, 2010	HV71	Timrå IK	Kinnarps Arena	7 000	3 - 2	SD	2 - 0
Saturday	March 20, 2010	Djurgårdens IF	Brynäs IF	Hovet	8 094	1 - 2	SD	1 - 1
Saturday	March 20, 2010	Linköpings HC	Frölunda HC	Cloetta Center	7 910	6 - 2		1 - 1
Saturday	March 20, 2010	Skellefteå AIK	Färjestads BK	Skellefteå Kraft Arena	6 001	2 - 3	SD	1 - 1

Round 3
Day	Date	Home team	Away team	Arena	Spectators	Results	Sudden death	Score
Monday	March 22, 2010	Timrå IK	HV71	E.ON Arena	5 651	6 - 3		1 - 2
Monday	March 22, 2010	Brynäs IF	Djurgårdens IF	Läkerol Arena	8 138	0 - 4		1 - 2
Monday	March 22, 2010	Frölunda HC	Linköpings HC	Scandinavium	10 497	2 - 1	SD	2 - 1
Monday	March 22, 2010	Färjestads BK	Skellefteå AIK	Löfbergs Lila Arena	6 688	5 - 4	SD	2 - 1

Round 4
Day	Date	Home team	Away team	Arena	Spectators	Results	Sudden death	Score
Wednesday	March 24, 2010	HV71	Timrå IK	Kinnarps Arena	6 941	2 – 0		3 - 1
Wednesday	March 24, 2010	Djurgårdens IF	Brynäs IF	Hovet	8 094	2 – 1		3 - 1
Wednesday	March 24, 2010	Linköpings HC	Frölunda HC	Cloetta Center	7 927	3 – 4		1 - 3
Wednesday	March 24, 2010	Skellefteå AIK	Färjestads BK	Skellefteå Kraft Arena	5 424	3 – 2	SD	2 – 2

Round 5
Day	Date	Home team	Away team	Arena	Spectators	Results	Sudden death	Score
Friday	March 26, 2010	HV71	Timrå IK	Kinnarps Arena	6 968	4 - 2		4 - 1
Friday	March 26, 2010	Djurgårdens IF	Brynäs IF	Ericsson Globe	13 850	3 - 2		4 - 1
Friday	March 26, 2010	Linköpings HC	Frölunda HC	Cloetta Center	7 932	3 - 2		2 - 3
Friday	March 26, 2010	Skellefteå AIK	Färjestads BK	Skellefteå Kraft Arena	5 873	2 - 0		3 - 2

Round 6
Day	Date	Home team	Away team	Arena	Spectators	Results	Sudden death	Score
Sunday	March 28, 2010	Frölunda HC	Linköpings HC	Scandinavium	11 199	2 - 3		3 - 3
Sunday	March 28, 2010	Färjestads BK	Skellefteå AIK	Löfbergs Lila Arena	6 754	2 - 1		3 - 3

Round 7
Day	Date	Home team	Away team	Arena	Spectators	Results	Sudden death	Score
Tuesday	March 30, 2010	Linköpings HC	Frölunda HC	Cloetta Center	8 500	4 - 2		4 - 3
Tuesday	March 30, 2010	Skellefteå AIK	Färjestads BK	Skellefteå Kraft Arena	5 771	2 - 1		4 - 3

==== Semifinals ====
In the semifinals, the best ranked team is paired with the lowest ranked team qualified for the semifinals. The two remaining teams will play against each other.

Semifinals 2009/2010

Round 1
Day	Date	Home team	Away team	Arena	Spectators	Results	Sudden death	Score
Thursday	April 1, 2010	Skellefteå AIK	HV71	Skellefteå Kraft Arena	5 014	0 - 2		0 - 1
Thursday	April 1, 2010	Linköpings HC	Djurgårdens IF	Cloetta Center	6 522	1 - 3		0 - 1

Round 2
Day	Date	Home team	Away team	Arena	Spectators	Results	Sudden death	Score
Saturday	April 3, 2010	HV71	Skellefteå AIK	Kinnarps Arena	7 000	3 - 5		1 - 1
Saturday	April 3, 2010	Djurgårdens IF	Linköpings HC	Hovet	7 696	3 - 2	SD	2 - 0

Round 3
Day	Date	Home team	Away team	Arena	Spectators	Results	Sudden death	Score
Monday	April 5, 2010	Skellefteå AIK	HV71	Skellefteå Kraft Arena	6 001	2 - 3	SD	1 - 2
Monday	April 5, 2010	Linköpings HC	Djurgårdens IF	Cloetta Center	8 350	2 - 0		1 - 2

Round 4
Day	Date	Home team	Away team	Arena	Spectators	Results	Sudden death	Score
Wednesday	April 7, 2010	HV71	Skellefteå AIK	Kinnarps Arena	7 000	3 - 2	SD	3 - 1
Wednesday	April 7, 2010	Djurgårdens IF	Linköpings HC	Ericsson Globe	13 850	2 - 1	SD	3 - 1

Round 5
Day	Date	Home team	Away team	Arena	Spectators	Results	Sudden death	Score
Thursday	April 8, 2010	HV71	Skellefteå AIK	Kinnarps Arena	7 000	4 - 1		4 - 1
Thursday	April 8, 2010	Djurgårdens IF	Linköpings HC	Ericsson Globe	13 050	5 - 1		4 - 1

==== Finals ====
Finals 2009/2010

Round 1
Day	Date	Home team	Away team	Arena	Spectators	Results	Sudden death	Score
Thursday	April 15, 2010	Djurgårdens IF	HV71	Hovet	8 094	4 - 3		1 - 0

Round 2
Day	Date	Home team	Away team	Arena	Spectators	Results	Sudden death	Score
Saturday	17 April 2010	HV71	Djurgårdens IF	Kinnarps Arena	7 000	4 - 3	SD	1 - 1

Round 3
Day	Date	Home team	Away team	Arena	Spectators	Results	Sudden death	Score
Monday	April 19, 2010	Djurgårdens IF	HV71	Ericsson Globe	13 850	1 - 2	SD	1 - 2

Round 4
Day	Date	Home team	Away team	Arena	Spectators	Results	Sudden death	Score
Wednesday	April 21, 2010	HV71	Djurgårdens IF	Kinnarps Arena	7 000	2 - 3	SD	2 - 2

Round 5
Day	Date	Home team	Away team	Arena	Spectators	Results	Sudden death	Score
Thursday	April 22, 2010	HV71	Djurgårdens IF	Kinnarps Arena	7 000	5 - 4	SD	3 - 2

Round 6
Day	Date	Home team	Away team	Arena	Spectators	Results	Sudden death	Score
Saturday	April 24, 2010	Djurgårdens IF	HV71	Hovet	8 094	2 - 3	SD	2 - 4

=== Playoff statistical leaders ===
==== Playoff scoring leaders ====
GP = Games played; G = Goals; A = Assists; Pts = Points; +/– = Plus/minus; PIM = Penalty minutes

Player	Team	GP	G	A	Pts	+/–	PIM
(Finland) Jukka Voutilainen	HV71	15	6	9	15	+8	12
(Sweden) Johan Davidsson	HV71	16	4	11	15	+7	6
(Sweden) Andreas Engqvist	Djurgårdens IF	16	5	8	13	+3	10
(Finland) Teemu Laine	HV71	16	5	8	13	+7	12
(Sweden) Martin Thörnberg	HV71	16	5	8	13	+7	0
(Sweden) Marcus Nilson	Djurgårdens IF	16	4	9	13	+4	6
(Czech Republic) Jan Hlaváč	Linköpings HC	12	6	6	12	+3	6
(Sweden) Tony Mårtensson	Linköpings HC	12	5	7	12	+4	2
(Sweden) Jimmie Ölvestad	Djurgårdens IF	16	6	5	11	+6	10
(Sweden) David Petrasek	HV71	16	5	6	11	+6	16

As of the end of the playoffs.

==== Playoff leading goaltenders ====
GP = Games played; TOI = Time on ice (minutes); GA = Goals against; SO = Shutouts; Sv% = Save percentage; GAA = Goals against average

Player	Team	GP	TOI	GA	SO	Sv%	GAA
(Sweden) Gustaf Wesslau	Djurgårdens IF	15	965:05	29	1	.940	1.80
(Sweden) Stefan Liv	HV71	16	1021:28	38	2	.906	2.23
(Sweden) Robin Rahm	Färjestads BK	7	451:59	17	0	.923	2.26
(Finland) Fredrik Norrena	Linköpings HC	9	560:52	22	1	.922	2.35
(Sweden) Andreas Hadelöv	Skellefteå AIK	12	756:56	30	1	.918	2.38

As of the end of the playoffs.

== Elitserien awards ==
Le Mat Trophy: HV71
Guldpucken: Magnus Johansson, Linköpings HC
Guldhjälmen: Mats Zuccarello, Modo Hockey
Honken Trophy: Jacob Markström, Brynäs IF
Håkan Loob Trophy: Jan Hlaváč, Linköpings HC
Rookie of the Year: Jacob Markström, Brynäs IF
Salming Trophy: Magnus Johansson, Linköpings HC
Playoff MVP (later renamed the Stefan Liv Memorial Trophy): Johan Davidsson, HV71
Guldpipan: Marcus Vinnerborg
