= 2007–08 Elitserien season =

- League: Elitserien
- Sport: Ice hockey
- Duration: September 24, 2007 – March 8, 2008

Regular season
- League champion: HV71
- Season MVP: Stefan Liv (HV71)
- Top scorer: Tony Mårtensson (Linköpings HC)

Playoffs

Finals
- Champions: HV71
- Runners-up: Linköpings HC

SHL seasons
- ← 2006–07 2008–09 →

The 2007–08 Elitserien season was the 33rd season of Elitserien. It began on September 24, 2007, with the regular season ending March 8, 2008. The playoffs of the 84th Swedish Championship ended on April 18, with HV71 taking the championship.

== League business ==
=== Rule changes ===
Elitserien brought in a rule change to the rules regarding icing. The team that plays the puck to icing is not allowed to change players before the next faceoff.

== Regular season ==
=== Final standings ===
GP = Games Played, W = Wins, L = Losses, T = Ties, OTW = Overtime Wins, OTL = Overtime Losses, GF = Goals For, GA = Goals Against, Pts = Points

Elitserien	GP	W	L	T	OTW	OTL	GF	GA	Pts
y-HV71	55	31	13	11	3	4	178	132	107
x-Linköpings HC	55	21	14	20	9	4	166	153	92
x-Modo Hockey	55	26	22	7	5	1	153	150	90
x-Färjestads BK	55	25	19	11	3	3	169	147	89
x-Timrå IK	55	23	23	9	5	2	134	136	83
x-Frölunda HC	55	23	22	10	3	4	159	157	82
x-Djurgårdens IF	55	21	20	14	2	2	145	139	79
x-Skellefteå AIK	55	19	20	16	2	6	135	141	71
e-Södertälje SK	55	18	24	13	2	4	123	129	69
e-Luleå HF	55	17	25	13	2	6	139	164	66
r-Mora IK	55	17	25	13	2	4	133	160	66
r-Brynäs IF	55	16	30	9	4	2	152	178	61

x - clinched playoff spot, y - clinched regular season league title, e - eliminated from playoff contention, r - play in relegation series

== Playoffs ==
After the regular season, the standard of 8 teams qualified for the playoffs.

=== Playoff bracket ===
In the first round, the highest remaining seed chose which of the four lowest remaining seeds to be matched against. In the second round, the highest remaining seed was matched against the lowest remaining seed. In each round the higher-seeded team was awarded home ice advantage. Each best-of-seven series followed a 1–1–1–2–1–1 format: the higher-seeded team played at home for games 2 and 4 (plus 5 and 7 if necessary), and the lower-seeded team was at home for game 1, 3 and 6 (if necessary).

Quarterfinals
1	HV71	4
8	Skellefteå AIK	1
2	Linköpings HC	4
7	Djurgårdens IF	1
(Pairings are reseeded after the first round)
3	Modo Hockey	1
5	Timrå IK	4
4	Färjestads BK	4
6	Frölunda HC	3

Semifinals
1	HV71	4
5	Timrå IK	2
2	Linköpings HC	4
4	Färjestads BK	1

Finals
1	HV71	4
2	Linköpings HC	2

Swedish Champions
2007–08
HV71
Third Title

== Elitserien awards ==
Le Mat Trophy: HV71
Guldpucken: Stefan Liv, HV71
Guldhjälmen: Tony Mårtensson, Linköpings HC
Honken Trophy: Daniel Larsson, Djurgårdens IF
Håkan Loob Trophy: Mattias Weinhandl, Linköpings HC
Rookie of the Year: Daniel Larsson, Djurgårdens IF
Salming Trophy: Mikko Luoma, HV71
Guldpipan: Marcus Vinnerborg, Ljungby
