= 2008–09 Elitserien season =

- League: Elitserien
- Sport: Ice hockey
- Duration: September 15, 2008 – February 28, 2009

Regular season
- League champion: Färjestads BK
- Season MVP: Jonas Gustavsson (Färjestad BK)
- Top scorer: Per-Åge Skrøder (Modo Hockey)

Playoffs

Finals
- Champions: Färjestad BK
- Runners-up: HV71

SHL seasons
- ← 2007–08 2009–10 →

The 2008–09 Elitserien season was the 34th season of Elitserien. It began on September 15, 2008, with the regular season ending February 28, 2009. The playoffs of the 85th Swedish Championship ended on April 8, with Färjestads BK taking the championship. The season started earlier than previous seasons due to the 2009 Men's World Ice Hockey Championships in Switzerland had been scheduled earlier than normal.

== League business ==
The match start time for Saturday matches was changed to start at 16:00 local time (UTC+1) instead of 15:00 as in previous seasons.

== Regular season ==
Djurgårdens IF changed their arena for home matches from Stockholm Globe Arena to Hovet. Also, Rögle BK changed to a new arena, Lindab Arena in Ängelholm.

The first goal of the season was scored by Lars Eller of Frölunda HC in Jönköping against HV71.

In the end of the regular season, Peter Forsberg played three games for Modo Hockey, totalling 3 points.

The top team: Färjestads BK, Linköpings HC, Frölunda HC, HV71, Luleå HF, Skellefteå AIK, Brynäs IF, and Timrå IK advanced to the playoffs. Whereas the bottom two teams advanced to the 2008-09 Kvalserien.

=== Final standings ===
GP = Games Played, W = Wins, L = Losses, T = Ties, OTW = Overtime Wins, OTL = Overtime Losses, GF = Goals For, GA = Goals Against, Pts = Points

Elitserien	GP	W	L	T	OTW	OTL	GF	GA	Pts
y – Färjestads BK	55	30	17	4	1	3	158	122	99
x – Linköpings HC	55	26	16	8	1	4	166	152	92
x – Frölunda HC	55	25	20	2	6	2	144	130	91
x – HV71	55	22	13	9	4	7	160	144	90
x – Luleå HF	55	26	20	3	0	6	149	136	87
x – Skellefteå AIK	55	21	22	3	5	4	149	141	80
x – Brynäs IF	55	21	22	6	4	2	128	140	79
x – Timrå IK	55	19	24	4	7	1	152	142	76
e – Modo Hockey	55	20	27	2	4	2	153	177	72
e – Djurgårdens IF	55	17	23	8	5	2	149	155	71
r – Rögle BK	55	18	25	4	1	7	152	178	67
r – Södertälje SK	55	12	28	7	5	3	122	165	56

x – clinched playoff spot; y – clinched regular season league title; e – eliminated from playoff contention; r – play in relegation series

=== Game log ===
2008–09 Game Log
September

Round	Date	Home	Result	Visitor	Venue	Attendance
7	Monday, September 15	HV71	6–2	Frölunda HC	Kinnarps Arena	7,038
1	Thursday, September 18	Skellefteå AIK	5–4 (OT)	Rögle BK	Skellefteå Kraft Arena	5,483
1	Thursday, September 18	Timrå IK	6–5	HV71	E.ON Arena	5,414
1	Thursday, September 18	Brynäs IF	3–2 (OT)	Färjestads BK	Läkerol Arena	6,365
1	Thursday, September 18	Djurgårdens IF	2–1	Luleå HF	Hovet	6,748
1	Thursday, September 18	Södertälje SK	2–1	Frölunda HC	AXA Sports Center	4,549
1	Thursday, September 18	Linköpings HC	4–2	Modo Hockey	Cloetta Center	7,148
2	Saturday, September 20	Luleå HF	3–2	Skellefteå AIK	COOP Arena	5,600
2	Saturday, September 20	Modo Hockey	2–2	Södertälje SK	Swedbank Arena	6,772
2	Saturday, September 20	Frölunda HC	1–2	Linköpings HC	Scandinavium	10,314
2	Saturday, September 20	Rögle BK	4–1	Färjestads BK	Lindab Arena	5,095
2	Sunday, September 21	HV71	1–3	Brynäs IF	Kinnarps Arena	6,893
3	Monday, September 22	Timrå IK	3–2 (OT)	Frölunda HC	E.ON Arena	5,337
3	Monday, September 22	Skellefteå AIK	4–5	Linköpings HC	Skellefteå Kraft Arena	4,568
3	Monday, September 22	Färjestads BK	2–0	Luleå HF	Löfbergs Lila Arena	5,447
3	Tuesday, September 23	Rögle BK	1–3	Modo Hockey	Lindab Arena	4,933
3	Tuesday, September 23	Brynäs IF	1–4	Djurgårdens IF	Läkerol Arena	5,211
3	Tuesday, September 23	Södertälje SK	3–3	HV71	AXA Sports Center	3,318
4	Thursday, September 25	Luleå HF	3–4 (OT)	Rögle BK	COOP Arena	4,012
4	Thursday, September 25	Brynäs IF	3–2	Timrå IK	Läkerol Arena	4,191
4	Thursday, September 25	Djurgårdens IF	2–5	Färjestads BK	Hovet	6,093
4	Thursday, September 25	Linköpings HC	3–3	Södertälje SK	Cloetta Center	6,458
4	Thursday, September 25	HV71	0–3	Skellefteå AIK	Kinnarps Arena	6,914
4	Thursday, September 25	Frölunda HC	3–2 (OT)	Modo Hockey	Scandinavium	10,159
5	Saturday, September 27	Luleå HF	2–3	HV71	COOP Arena	3,857
5	Saturday, September 27	Skellefteå AIK	3–1	Södertälje SK	Skellefteå Kraft Arena	5,184
5	Saturday, September 27	Modo Hockey	6–3	Djurgårdens IF	Swedbank Arena	7,021
5	Saturday, September 27	Rögle BK	3–4	Brynäs IF	Lindab Arena	4,806
5	Saturday, September 27	Linköpings HC	4–5	Timrå IK	Cloetta Center	6,940
5	Saturday, September 27	Färjestads BK	2–1	Frölunda HC	Löfbergs Lila Arena	7,483
6	Monday, September 29	HV71	1–3	Linköpings HC	Kinnarps Arena	6,965
6	Monday, September 29	Frölunda HC	4–1	Rögle BK	Scandinavium	10,297
6	Monday, September 29	Brynäs IF	5–4	Modo Hockey	Läkerol Arena	5,574
6	Tuesday, September 30	Timrå IK	3–1	Luleå HF	E.ON Arena	5,241
6	Tuesday, September 30	Djurgårdens IF	3–2 (OT)	Skellefteå AIK	Hovet	5,113
6	Tuesday, September 30	Södertälje SK	0–2	Färjestads BK	AXA Sports Center	3,757

October

Round	Date	Home	Result	Visitor	Venue	Attendance
7	Thursday, October 2	Rögle BK	4–1	Södertälje SK	Lindab Arena	4,008
7	Thursday, October 2	Linköpings HC	3–2 (OT)	Djurgårdens IF	Cloetta Center	6,778
7	Thursday, October 2	Modo Hockey	4–3	Timrå IK	Swedbank Arena	7,410
7	Thursday, October 2	Skellefteå AIK	3–0	Färjestads BK	Skellefteå Kraft Arena	5,148
7	Thursday, October 2	Luleå HF	2–4	Brynäs IF	COOP Arena	3,864
8	Saturday, October 4	Brynäs IF	2–0	Linköpings HC	Läkerol Arena	7,287
8	Saturday, October 4	Timrå IK	4–5	Rögle BK	E.ON Arena	5,306
8	Saturday, October 4	Södertälje SK	4–3 (OT)	Luleå HF	AXA Sports Center	4,077
8	Saturday, October 4	Färjestads BK	1–3	Modo Hockey	Löfbergs Lila Arena	6,131
20	Saturday, October 4	HV71	3–2	Djurgårdens IF	Kinnarps Arena	6,908
8	Sunday, October 5	Frölunda HC	2–1	Skellefteå AIK	Scandinavium	11,488
10	Monday, October 6	Linköpings HC	4–1	Luleå HF	Cloetta Center	5,611
2	Tuesday, October 7	Djurgårdens IF	2–1	Timrå IK	Hovet	5,828
9	Thursday, October 9	Luleå HF	8–2	Frölunda HC	COOP Arena	4,180
9	Thursday, October 9	Skellefteå AIK	5–2	Brynäs IF	Skellefteå Kraft Arena	5,296
9	Thursday, October 9	Modo Hockey	1–5	HV71	Swedbank Arena	6,024
9	Thursday, October 9	Rögle BK	3–3	Djurgårdens IF	Lindab Arena	4,973
9	Thursday, October 9	Södertälje SK	5–2	Timrå IK	AXA Sports Center	3,219
9	Thursday, October 9	Färjestads BK	0–3	Linköpings HC	Löfbergs Lila Arena	5,125
10	Saturday, October 11	Timrå IK	4–6	Färjestads BK	E.ON Arena	4,961
10	Saturday, October 11	HV71	3–2 (OT)	Rögle BK	Kinnarps Arena	7,038
10	Saturday, October 11	Djurgårdens IF	1–5	Frölunda HC	Hovet	6,055
10	Saturday, October 11	Brynäs IF	1–0	Södertälje SK	Läkerol Arena	6,578
10	Saturday, October 11	Skellefteå AIK	4–2	Modo Hockey	Skellefteå Kraft Arena	5,820
11	Monday, October 13	Timrå IK	3–2 (OT)	Skellefteå AIK	E.ON Arena	4,889
11	Monday, October 13	Södertälje SK	2–4	Djurgårdens IF	AXA Sports Center	4,611
11	Monday, October 13	Frölunda HC	1–1	Brynäs IF	Scandinavium	11,188
11	Tuesday, October 14	Färjestads BK	4–2	HV71	Löfbergs Lila Arena	6,023
11	Tuesday, October 14	Rögle BK	3–2	Linköpings HC	Lindab Arena	4,764
11	Tuesday, October 14	Modo Hockey	3–2 (OT)	Luleå HF	Swedbank Arena	5,809
12	Thursday, October 16	HV71	2–1 (OT)	Timrå IK	Kinnarps Arena	6,849
12	Thursday, October 16	Linköpings HC	4–0	Färjestads BK	Cloetta Center	8,040
12	Thursday, October 16	Djurgårdens IF	2–1 (OT)	Rögle BK	Hovet	4,679
12	Thursday, October 16	Brynäs IF	5–1	Skellefteå AIK	Läkerol Arena	5,197
12	Thursday, October 16	Modo Hockey	3–2	Frölunda HC	Swedbank Arena	5,492
12	Thursday, October 16	Luleå HF	6–2	Södertälje SK	COOP Arena	5,340
13	Saturday, October 18	Skellefteå AIK	4–1	Luleå HF	Skellefteå Kraft Arena	6,001
13	Saturday, October 18	Frölunda HC	5–3	HV71	Scandinavium	12,044
13	Saturday, October 18	Färjestads BK	5–1	Brynäs IF	Löfbergs Lila Arena	7,144
13	Saturday, October 18	Södertälje SK	2–3 (OT)	Modo Hockey	AXA Sports Center	3,801
13	Saturday, October 18	Djurgårdens IF	3–1	Linköpings HC	Hovet	5,657
13	Saturday, October 18	Rögle BK	5–1	Timrå IK	Lindab Arena	4,837
14	Tuesday, October 21	Frölunda HC	2–2	Färjestads BK	Scandinavium	11,715
8	Tuesday, October 21	HV71	2–2	Djurgårdens IF	Kinnarps Arena	6,987
14	Thursday, October 23	HV71	6–3	Södertälje SK	Kinnarps Arena	6,851
14	Thursday, October 23	Rögle BK	1–2	Skellefteå AIK	Lindab Arena	4,801
14	Thursday, October 23	Timrå IK	3–1	Brynäs IF	E.ON Arena	5,540
14	Thursday, October 23	Modo Hockey	3–5	Linköpings HC	Swedbank Arena	5,514
14	Thursday, October 23	Luleå HF	4–5 (OT)	Djurgårdens IF	COOP Arena	5,501
15	Saturday, October 25	Färjestads BK	2–3	Rögle BK	Löfbergs Lila Arena	6,788
15	Saturday, October 25	Södertälje SK	2–3	Skellefteå AIK	AXA Sports Center	4,515
15	Saturday, October 25	HV71	2–5	Modo Hockey	Kinnarps Arena	7,020
15	Saturday, October 25	Brynäs IF	2–4	Luleå HF	Läkerol Arena	8,180
15	Saturday, October 25	Linköpings HC	2–3 (OT)	Frölunda HC	Cloetta Center	8,500
15	Saturday, October 25	Timrå IK	3–2 (OT)	Djurgårdens IF	E.ON Arena	5,373
16	Monday, October 27	Linköpings HC	1–2 (OT)	HV71	Cloetta Center	8,500
16	Monday, October 27	Luleå HF	1–0	Färjestads BK	COOP Arena	5,207
16	Monday, October 27	Rögle BK	6–3	Frölunda HC	Lindab Arena	5,040
16	Tuesday, October 28	Djurgårdens IF	3–5	Södertälje SK	Hovet	7,483
16	Tuesday, October 28	Skellefteå AIK	3–4 (OT)	Timrå IK	Skellefteå Kraft Arena	5,751
16	Tuesday, October 28	Modo Hockey	6–0	Brynäs IF	Swedbank Arena	6,506
17	Thursday, October 30	Färjestads BK	2–1	Djurgårdens IF	Löfbergs Lila Arena	7,652
17	Thursday, October 30	Södertälje SK	4–5 (OT)	Linköpings HC	AXA Sports Center	3,855
17	Thursday, October 30	Frölunda HC	3–1	Luleå HF	Scandinavium	11,537
17	Thursday, October 30	Brynäs IF	1–2	Rögle BK	Läkerol Arena	5,801
17	Thursday, October 30	Skellefteå AIK	5–1	HV71	Skellefteå Kraft Arena	5,665
17	Thursday, October 30	Timrå IK	0–4	Modo Hockey	E.ON Arena	6,000

November

Round	Date	Home	Result	Visitor	Venue	Attendance
18	Saturday, November 1	Luleå HF	5–1	Timrå IK	COOP Arena	4,650
18	Saturday, November 1	Djurgårdens IF	3–6	Frölunda HC	Hovet	6,345
18	Saturday, November 1	HV71	4–3	Färjestads BK	Kinnarps Arena	7,038
18	Saturday, November 1	Södertälje SK	4–1	Brynäs IF	AXA Sports Center	4,682
18	Saturday, November 1	Modo Hockey	2–3	Rögle BK	Swedbank Arena	6,962
19	Monday, November 3	Timrå IK	2–3	Linköpings HC	E.ON Arena	4,817
19	Monday, November 3	Modo Hockey	4–3	Djurgårdens IF	Swedbank Arena	5,444
19	Monday, November 3	Brynäs IF	4–3 (OT)	HV71	Läkerol Arena	4,408
19	Monday, November 3	Skellefteå AIK	1–3	Frölunda HC	Skellefteå Kraft Arena	5,252
19	Monday, November 3	Färjestads BK	2–2	Södertälje SK	Löfbergs Lila Arena	6,100
19	Monday, November 3	Rögle BK	3–5	Luleå HF	Lindab Arena	4,920
18	Monday, November 10	Linköpings HC	5–3	Skellefteå AIK	Cloetta Center	6,168
31	Tuesday, November 11	Djurgårdens IF	7–0	Modo Hockey	Hovet	5,793
20	Thursday, November 13	Linköpings HC	3–1	Brynäs IF	Cloetta Center	8,237
20	Thursday, November 13	Frölunda HC	0–2	Timrå IK	Scandinavium	11,020
20	Thursday, November 13	Färjestads BK	5–2	Skellefteå AIK	Löfbergs Lila Arena	5,488
20	Thursday, November 13	Södertälje SK	3–2	Rögle BK	AXA Sports Center	3,895
20	Thursday, November 13	Luleå HF	3–2	Modo Hockey	COOP Arena	4,958
21	Saturday, November 15	Rögle BK	1–2	HV71	Lindab Arena	5,043
21	Saturday, November 15	Brynäs IF	2–1	Frölunda HC	Läkerol Arena	7,974
21	Saturday, November 15	Timrå IK	2–0	Södertälje SK	E.ON Arena	5,332
21	Saturday, November 15	Färjestads BK	5–2	Modo Hockey	Löfbergs Lila Arena	7,213
21	Saturday, November 15	Skellefteå AIK	2–2	Djurgårdens IF	Skellefteå Kraft Arena	5,636
21	Saturday, November 15	Luleå HF	3–1	Linköpings HC	COOP Arena	4,964
22	Monday, November 17	Frölunda HC	3–2	Södertälje SK	Scandinavium	11,248
22	Monday, November 17	Linköpings HC	3–1	Rögle BK	Cloetta Center	6,565
22	Monday, November 17	Modo Hockey	0–6	Skellefteå AIK	Swedbank Arena	7,539
22	Tuesday, November 18	HV71	1–1	Luleå HF	Kinnarps Arena	7,013
22	Tuesday, November 18	Färjestads BK	2–0	Timrå IK	Löfbergs Lila Arena	5,186
22	Tuesday, November 18	Djurgårdens IF	2–4	Brynäs IF	Hovet	7,131
23	Thursday, November 20	Rögle BK	3–0	Modo Hockey	Lindab Arena	4,384
23	Thursday, November 20	Djurgårdens IF	1–4	Frölunda HC	Hovet	4,227
23	Thursday, November 20	Brynäs IF	2–2	Färjestads BK	Läkerol Arena	5,521
23	Thursday, November 20	Timrå IK	3–2 (OT)	Luleå HF	E.ON Arena	5,140
23	Thursday, November 20	Skellefteå AIK	2–4	Linköpings HC	Skellefteå Kraft Arena	5,277
23	Thursday, November 20	Södertälje SK	2–3 (OT)	HV71	AXA Sports Center	3,526
24	Saturday, November 22	Linköpings HC	2–6	Timrå IK	Cloetta Center	7,632
24	Saturday, November 22	HV71	3–4 (OT)	Skellefteå AIK	Kinnarps Arena	6,951
24	Saturday, November 22	Färjestads BK	0–2	Frölunda HC	Löfbergs Lila Arena	8,250
24	Saturday, November 22	Rögle BK	4–3	Djurgårdens IF	Lindab Arena	4,675
24	Saturday, November 22	Luleå HF	3–3	Brynäs IF	COOP Arena	5,105
24	Saturday, November 22	Modo Hockey	3–0	Södertälje SK	Swedbank Arena	5,971
25	Monday, November 24	Brynäs IF	1–0	Södertälje SK	Löfbergs Lila Arena	3,978
25	Monday, November 24	Djurgårdens IF	4–2	Timrå IK	Hovet	3,319
25	Monday, November 24	Luleå HF	1–1	HV71	COOP Arena	4,378
25	Tuesday, November 25	Frölunda HC	5–0	Rögle BK	Scandinavium	11,011
25	Tuesday, November 25	Skellefteå AIK	3–2 (OT)	Färjestads BK	Skellefteå Kraft Arena	4,531
25	Tuesday, November 25	Linköpings HC	1–5	Modo Hockey	Cloetta Center	6,889
26	Thursday, November 27	HV71	2–3 (OT)	Frölunda HC	Kinnarps Arena	7,038
26	Thursday, November 27	Modo Hockey	3–7	Luleå HF	Swedbank Arena	6,151
26	Thursday, November 27	Timrå IK	4–3	Skellefteå AIK	E.ON Arena	5,396
26	Thursday, November 27	Rögle BK	4–3	Brynäs IF	Lindab Arena	4,744
26	Thursday, November 27	Södertälje SK	4–1	Djurgårdens IF	AXA Sports Center	3,926
26	Thursday, November 27	Färjestads BK	4–1	Linköpings HC	Löfbergs Lila Arena	5,482
27	Saturday, November 29	Modo Hockey	3–4	Färjestads BK	Swedbank Arena	7,029
27	Saturday, November 29	Djurgårdens IF	1–5	HV71	Hovet	6,092
27	Saturday, November 29	Brynäs IF	2–1	Timrå IK	Läkerol Arena	7,066
27	Saturday, November 29	Luleå HF	5–3	Rögle BK	COOP Arena	5,191
27	Saturday, November 29	Skellefteå AIK	4–3	Södertälje SK	Skellefteå Kraft Arena	5,163
27	Sunday, November 30	Frölunda HC	0–5	Linköpings HC	Scandinavium	11,061

December

Round	Date	Home	Result	Visitor	Venue	Attendance
28	Monday, December 1	Södertälje SK	3–1	Färjestads BK	AXA Sports Center	3,141
28	Monday, December 1	Skellefteå AIK	2–2	Brynäs IF	Skellefteå Kraft Arena	4,704
28	Monday, December 1	HV71	3–2	Rögle BK	Kinnarps Arena	6,865
28	Tuesday, December 2	Linköpings HC	3–3	Djurgårdens IF	Cloetta Center	6,978
28	Tuesday, December 2	Luleå HF	2–1	Frölunda HC	COOP Arena	5,005
29	Thursday, December 4	Färjestads BK	5–3	Luleå HF	Löfbergs Lila Arena	5,254
29	Thursday, December 4	Brynäs IF	2–1 (OT)	Linköpings HC	Läkerol Arena	4,882
29	Thursday, December 4	Timrå IK	3–2 (OT)	HV71	E.ON Arena	5,409
29	Thursday, December 4	Rögle BK	4–5 (OT)	Södertälje SK	Lindab Arena	4,534
29	Thursday, December 4	Djurgårdens IF	0–2	Skellefteå AIK	Hovet	3,930
29	Thursday, December 4	Frölunda HC	6–1	Modo Hockey	Scandinavium	11,459
30	Saturday, December 6	HV71	2–2	Brynäs IF	Kinnarps Arena	6,982
30	Saturday, December 6	Södertälje SK	1–2	Frölunda HC	AXA Sports Center	3,629
30	Saturday, December 6	Skellefteå AIK	4–5 (OT)	Modo Hockey	Skellefteå Kraft Arena	5,676
30	Saturday, December 6	Timrå IK	5–2	Rögle BK	E.ON Arena	5,239
30	Saturday, December 6	Djurgårdens IF	3–2	Färjestads BK	Hovet	5,029
31	Monday, December 8	HV71	5–6	Linköpings HC	Kinnarps Arena	7,038
31	Monday, December 8	Rögle BK	1–3	Färjestads BK	Lindab Arena	4,789
31	Monday, December 8	Frölunda HC	4–2	Brynäs IF	Scandinavium	11,582
31	Tuesday, December 9	Luleå HF	2–1	Skellefteå AIK	COOP Arena	5,600
31	Tuesday, December 9	Södertälje SK	3–2	Timrå IK	AXA Sports Center	2,858
32	Thursday, December 11	Linköpings HC	1–2	Södertälje SK	Cloetta Center	6,209
32	Thursday, December 11	Färjestads BK	2–3	HV71	Löfbergs Lila Arena	5,631
32	Thursday, December 11	Djurgårdens IF	3–2 (OT)	Luleå HF	Hovet	3,936
32	Thursday, December 11	Brynäs IF	1–2 (OT)	Modo Hockey	Läkerol Arena	5,354
32	Thursday, December 11	Timrå IK	4–3 (OT)	Frölunda HC	E.ON Arena	5,042
32	Thursday, December 11	Skellefteå AIK	5–2	Rögle BK	Skellefteå Kraft Arena	4,529
33	Saturday, December 13	Brynäs IF	3–3	Djurgårdens IF	Läkerol Arena	7,465
33	Saturday, December 13	Frölunda HC	0–2	Skellefteå AIK	Scandinavium	10,666
33	Saturday, December 13	Södertälje SK	1–2	Luleå HF	AXA Sports Center	3,750
33	Saturday, December 13	Rögle BK	5–5	Linköpings HC	Lindab Arena	4,539
33	Saturday, December 13	Timrå IK	0–3	Färjestads BK	E.ON Arena	4,902
33	Sunday, December 14	Modo Hockey	1–4	HV71	Swedbank Arena	5,562
30	Monday, December 15	Linköpings HC	3–6	Luleå HF	Cloetta Center	7,464
34	Friday, December 26	Frölunda HC	3–2 (OT)	Färjestads BK	Scandinavium	12,044
34	Friday, December 26	HV71	3–2	Södertälje SK	Kinnarps Arena	7,038
34	Friday, December 26	Linköpings HC	5–3	Brynäs IF	Cloetta Center	8,500
34	Friday, December 26	Djurgårdens IF	3–1	Rögle BK	Hovet	7,032
34	Friday, December 26	Skellefteå AIK	1–3	Timrå IK	Skellefteå Kraft Arena	6,001
34	Friday, December 26	Luleå HF	4–2	Modo Hockey	COOP Arena	5,600
35	Sunday, December 28	Färjestads BK	4–1	Djurgårdens IF	Löfbergs Lila Arena	8,073
35	Sunday, December 28	Södertälje SK	2–1	Skellefteå AIK	AXA Sports Center	3,885
35	Sunday, December 28	Rögle BK	3–1	Luleå HF	Lindab Arena	5,007
35	Sunday, December 28	Brynäs IF	4–6	HV71	Läkerol Arena	6,202
35	Sunday, December 28	Timrå IK	1–1	Linköpings HC	E.ON Arena	5,781
35	Sunday, December 28	Modo Hockey	1–3	Frölunda HC	Swedbank Arena	7,600
36	Tuesday, December 30	Luleå HF	2–1	Färjestads BK	COOP Arena	5,283
36	Tuesday, December 30	Brynäs IF	4–1	Rögle BK	Läkerol Arena	5,765
36	Tuesday, December 30	Djurgårdens IF	3–3	Södertälje SK	Hovet	6,525
36	Tuesday, December 30	Linköpings HC	5–2	Skellefteå AIK	Cloetta Center	8,046
36	Tuesday, December 30	HV71	3–2	Modo Hockey	Kinnarps Arena	7,038
36	Tuesday, December 30	Frölunda HC	2–1	Timrå IK	Scandinavium	11,362

January

Round	Date	Home	Result	Visitor	Venue	Attendance
37	Saturday, January 3	Djurgårdens IF	1–2	HV71	Hovet	8,092
37	Saturday, January 3	Skellefteå AIK	7–1	Luleå HF	Skellefteå Kraft Arena	6,001
37	Saturday, January 3	Modo Hockey	3–2	Färjestads BK	Swedbank Arena	6,726
37	Saturday, January 3	Rögle BK	3–2	Timrå IK	Lindab Arena	4,916
37	Saturday, January 3	Södertälje SK	1–2 (OT)	Brynäs IF	AXA Sports Center	4,698
37	Saturday, January 3	Frölunda HC	2–3	Linköpings HC	Scandinavium	11,800
38	Monday, January 5	Färjestads BK	3–2	Brynäs IF	Löfbergs Lila Arena	6,394
38	Monday, January 5	Södertälje SK	2–4	Linköpings HC	AXA Sports Center	3,335
38	Monday, January 5	Rögle BK	6–5	HV71	Lindab Arena	4,940
38	Monday, January 5	Timrå IK	4–1	Modo Hockey	E.ON Arena	6,000
38	Monday, January 5	Skellefteå AIK	5–3	Frölunda HC	Skellefteå Kraft Arena	5,475
38	Monday, January 5	Luleå HF	2–6	Djurgårdens IF	COOP Arena	4,599
39	Thursday, January 8	HV71	1–1	Timrå IK	Kinnarps Arena	6,904
39	Thursday, January 8	Färjestads BK	5–1	Skellefteå AIK	Löfbergs Lila Arena	5,718
39	Thursday, January 8	Brynäs IF	1–0	Luleå HF	Läkerol Arena	4,363
39	Thursday, January 8	Modo Hockey	5–2	Rögle BK	Swedbank Arena	5,544
40	Saturday, January 10	HV71	2–0	Färjestads BK	Kinnarps Arena	7,038
40	Saturday, January 10	Linköpings HC	3–3	Rögle BK	Cloetta Center	8,443
40	Saturday, January 10	Södertälje SK	2–7	Modo Hockey	AXA Sports Center	3,720
40	Saturday, January 10	Brynäs IF	5–4	Skellefteå AIK	Läkerol Arena	6,234
40	Saturday, January 10	Timrå IK	4–2	Djurgårdens IF	E.ON Arena	5,307
28	Monday, January 12	Modo Hockey	2–1	Timrå IK	Swedbank Arena	6,626
39	Monday, January 12	Djurgårdens IF	5–1	Linköpings HC	Hovet	4,573
40	Tuesday, January 13	Frölunda HC	1–2	Luleå HF	Scandinavium	10,568
41	Thursday, January 15	Linköpings HC	3–3	HV71	Cloetta Center	8,500
41	Thursday, January 15	Färjestads BK	6–3	Södertälje SK	Löfbergs Lila Arena	5,378
41	Thursday, January 15	Rögle BK	5–0	Frölunda HC	Lindab Arena	4,975
41	Thursday, January 15	Modo Hockey	2–1	Brynäs IF	Swedbank Arena	5,768
41	Thursday, January 15	Skellefteå AIK	1–2	Djurgårdens IF	Skellefteå Kraft Arena	4,491
41	Thursday, January 15	Luleå HF	3–4	Timrå IK	COOP Arena	4,892
42	Saturday, January 17	Luleå HF	0–2	Linköpings HC	COOP Arena	4,995
42	Saturday, January 17	Färjestads BK	6–2	Rögle BK	Löfbergs Lila Arena	6,921
42	Saturday, January 17	Djurgårdens IF	5–3	Modo Hockey	Hovet	7,549
42	Saturday, January 17	Brynäs IF	3–1	Frölunda HC	Läkerol Arena	7,909
42	Saturday, January 17	Timrå IK	4–2	Södertälje SK	E.ON Arena	5,141
42	Saturday, January 17	Skellefteå AIK	2–4	HV71	Skellefteå Kraft Arena	5,400
43	Monday, January 19	Linköpings HC	3–3	Färjestads BK	Cloetta Center	7,149
43	Monday, January 19	HV71	2–1	Luleå HF	Kinnarps Arena	7,038
39	Tuesday, January 20	Frölunda HC	3–1	Södertälje SK	Scandinavium	10,036
43	Thursday, January 22	Frölunda HC	1–2	Djurgårdens IF	Scandinavium	10,850
43	Thursday, January 22	Timrå IK	4–1	Brynäs IF	E.ON Arena	5,802
43	Thursday, January 22	Södertälje SK	3–3	Rögle BK	AXA Sports Center	6,130
43	Thursday, January 22	Skellefteå AIK	5–0	Modo Hockey	Skellefteå Kraft Arena	5,162
44	Saturday, January 24	Djurgårdens IF	2–1	Brynäs IF	Hovet	8,094
44	Saturday, January 24	Luleå HF	5–0	Södertälje SK	COOP Arena	4,739
44	Saturday, January 24	Rögle BK	1–2	Skellefteå AIK	Lindab Arena	4,913
44	Saturday, January 24	Färjestads BK	6–3	Timrå IK	Läkerol Arena	6,317
44	Saturday, January 24	Frölunda HC	5–4 (OT)	HV71	Scandinavium	12,044
44	Saturday, January 24	Modo Hockey	1–3	Linköpings HC	Swedbank Arena	7,028
45	Monday, January 26	Linköpings HC	2–1	Djurgårdens IF	Cloetta Center	7,029
45	Monday, January 26	Södertälje SK	3–2 (OT)	HV71	AXA Sports Center	4,500
45	Monday, January 26	Brynäs IF	2–4	Modo Hockey	Läkerol Arena	5,583
45	Tuesday, January 27	Luleå HF	4–2	Frölunda HC	COOP Arena	4,706
45	Tuesday, January 27	Skellefteå AIK	0–1	Färjestads BK	Skellefteå Kraft Arena	4,771
45	Tuesday, January 27	Timrå IK	3–2	Rögle BK	E.ON Arena	5,244
46	Thursday, January 29	HV71	2–2	Linköpings HC	Kinnarps Arena	7,038
46	Thursday, January 29	Färjestads BK	3–2	Luleå HF	Löfbergs Lila Arena	7,172
46	Thursday, January 29	Södertälje SK	1–4	Frölunda HC	AXA Sports Center	2,470
46	Thursday, January 29	Rögle BK	3–4 (OT)	Djurgårdens IF	Lindab Arena	4,845
46	Thursday, January 29	Modo Hockey	3–2	Timrå IK	Swedbank Arena	6,836
46	Thursday, January 29	Skellefteå AIK	2–1 (OT)	Brynäs IF	Skellefteå Kraft Arena	5,029
47	Saturday, January 31	Linköpings HC	6–1	Modo Hockey	Cloetta Center	8,309
47	Saturday, January 31	Frölunda HC	1–0	Skellefteå AIK	Scandinavium	11,311
47	Saturday, January 31	Djurgårdens IF	3–5	HV71	Hovet	8,094
47	Saturday, January 31	Rögle BK	6–2	Södertälje SK	Lindab Arena	4,661
47	Saturday, January 31	Timrå IK	6–0	Färjestads BK	E.ON Arena	5,846
47	Saturday, January 31	Luleå HF	5–0	Brynäs IF	COOP Arena	5,248

February

Round	Date	Home	Result	Visitor	Venue	Attendance
50	Tuesday, February 10	Frölunda HC	4–1	Brynäs IF	Scandinavium	11,497
48	Thursday, February 12	Frölunda HC	4–1	Rögle BK	Scandinavium	11,186
48	Thursday, February 12	Södertälje SK	3–2	Färjestads BK	AXA Sports Center	2,905
48	Thursday, February 12	Djurgårdens IF	5–2	Luleå HF	Hovet	6,834
48	Thursday, February 12	Brynäs IF	6–1	Linköpings HC	Läkerol Arena	4,881
48	Thursday, February 12	Timrå IK	3–3	HV71	E.ON Arena	5,414
48	Thursday, February 12	Modo Hockey	4–1	Skellefteå AIK	Swedbank Arena	7,543
49	Saturday, February 14	Färjestads BK	8–1	Frölunda HC	Löfbergs Lila Arena	8,250
49	Saturday, February 14	HV71	2–3	Skellefteå AIK	Kinnarps Arena	7,038
49	Saturday, February 14	Linköpings HC	1–3	Timrå IK	Cloetta Center	8,121
49	Saturday, February 14	Södertälje SK	0–4	Luleå HF	AXA Sports Center	3,225
49	Saturday, February 14	Rögle BK	1–4	Brynäs IF	Lindab Arena	5,011
49	Saturday, February 14	Modo Hockey	4–4	Djurgårdens IF	Swedbank Arena	7,600
50	Monday, February 16	Färjestads BK	6–3	Linköpings HC	Löfbergs Lila Arena	7,091
50	Monday, February 16	Skellefteå AIK	3–0	Södertälje SK	Skellefteå Kraft Arena	5,268
50	Monday, February 16	Luleå HF	6–1	Rögle BK	COOP Arena	4,905
50	Tuesday, February 17	Modo Hockey	4–6	HV71	Swedbank Arena	6,485
50	Tuesday, February 17	Djurgårdens IF	4–1	Timrå IK	Hovet	6,622
51	Thursday, February 19	HV71	2–3 (OT)	Frölunda HC	Kinnarps Arena	7,038
51	Thursday, February 19	Linköpings HC	1–3	Luleå HF	Cloetta Center	7,992
51	Thursday, February 19	Djurgårdens IF	3–4	Färjestads BK	Hovet	8,094
51	Thursday, February 19	Rögle BK	6–2	Modo Hockey	Lindab Arena	5,071
51	Thursday, February 19	Brynäs IF	3–1	Södertälje SK	Läkerol Arena	6,325
51	Thursday, February 19	Timrå IK	8–0	Skellefteå AIK	E.ON Arena	5,804
52	Saturday, February 21	Södertälje SK	2–2	Timrå IK	AXA Sports Center	2,859
52	Saturday, February 21	Linköpings HC	1–4	Frölunda HC	Cloetta Center	8,401
52	Saturday, February 21	Färjestads BK	6–3	Modo Hockey	Löfbergs Lila Arena	8,250
52	Saturday, February 21	Brynäs IF	4–2	Djurgårdens IF	Läkerol Arena	8,166
52	Saturday, February 21	Skellefteå AIK	3–2 (OT)	Rögle BK	Skellefteå Kraft Arena	5,541
52	Saturday, February 21	Luleå HF	2–1	HV71	COOP Arena	5,497
53	Monday, February 23	Modo Hockey	5–0	Luleå HF	Swedbank Arena	6,433
53	Monday, February 23	Timrå IK	2–3	Frölunda HC	E.ON Arena	5,624
53	Monday, February 23	Rögle BK	3–4 (OT)	Färjestads BK	Lindab Arena	5,031
53	Tuesday, February 24	HV71	3–1	Brynäs IF	Kinnarps Arena	7,038
53	Tuesday, February 24	Linköpings HC	7–5	Södertälje SK	Cloetta Center	7,004
53	Tuesday, February 24	Djurgårdens IF	2–2	Skellefteå AIK	Hovet	7,559
54	Thursday, February 26	Frölunda HC	4–2	Modo Hockey	Scandinavium	12,044
54	Thursday, February 26	Färjestads BK	2–1	HV71	Löfbergs Lila Arena	7,626
54	Thursday, February 26	Södertälje SK	3–1	Djurgårdens IF	AXA Sports Center	4,049
54	Thursday, February 26	Rögle BK	3–6	Linköpings HC	Lindab Arena	4,712
54	Thursday, February 26	Brynäs IF	4–3	Timrå IK	Läkerol Arena	7,293
54	Thursday, February 26	Luleå HF	2–3	Skellefteå AIK	COOP Arena	5,600
55	Saturday, February 28	Skellefteå AIK	3–6	Linköpings HC	Skellefteå Kraft Arena	5,422
55	Saturday, February 28	Modo Hockey	3–4 (OT)	Södertälje SK	Swedbank Arena	6,661
55	Saturday, February 28	Timrå IK	2–3	Luleå HF	E.ON Arena	5,911
55	Saturday, February 28	Brynäs IF	1–3	Färjestads BK	Läkerol Arena	7,522
55	Saturday, February 28	Frölunda HC	5–3	Djurgårdens IF	Scandinavium	11,795
55	Saturday, February 28	HV71	5–2	Rögle BK	Kinnarps Arena	6,996

=== Statistical leaders ===
==== Scoring leaders ====
GP = Games played, G = Goals, A = Assists, Pts = Points, +/– = Plus/Minus, PIM = Penalty Minutes

Player	Team	GP	G	A	Pts	+/–	PIM
(Norway) Per-Åge Skrøder	Modo Hockey	55	30	29	59	+26	78
(Sweden) Fredrik Bremberg	Djurgårdens IF	53	17	40	57	−8	26
(Sweden) Linus Omark	Luleå HF	53	23	32	55	+18	66
(Czech Republic) Jaroslav Hlinka	Linköpings HC	54	12	43	55	+8	16
(Sweden) Niklas Sundström	Modo Hockey	49	18	35	53	+22	70
(Sweden) Johan Davidsson	HV71	55	13	37	50	0	24
(Sweden) Johan Harju	Luleå HF	55	27	22	49	+13	30
(Czech Republic) Jan Hlaváč	Linköpings HC	54	25	23	48	+6	28
(Finland) Jukka Voutilainen	HV71	52	17	30	47	+8	63
(Sweden) Rickard Wallin	Färjestads BK	55	18	27	45	+7	56

== Playoffs ==
After the regular season, the standard of 8 teams qualified for the playoffs.

=== Playoff bracket ===
In the first round, the highest remaining seed chose which of the four lowest remaining seeds to be matched against. In the second round, the highest remaining seed was matched against the lowest remaining seed. In each round the higher-seeded team was awarded home ice advantage. Each best-of-seven series followed a 1–1–1–2–1–1 format: the higher-seeded team played at home for games 2 and 4 (plus 5 and 7 if necessary), and the lower-seeded team was at home for game 1, 3 and 6 (if necessary).

Quarterfinals
1	Färjestads BK	4
7	Brynäs IF	0
2	Linköpings HC	3
6	Skellefteå AIK	4
(Pairings are reseeded after the first round)
3	Frölunda HC	4
5	Luleå HC	1
4	HV71	4
8	Timrå IK	3

Semifinals
1	Färjestads BK	4
6	Skellefteå AIK	0
3	Frölunda HC	2
4	HV71	4

Finals
1	Färjestads BK	4
4	HV71	1

Swedish Champions
2008–09
Färjestads BK
Eighth title

== Elitserien awards ==
Le Mat Trophy: Färjestads BK
Guldpucken: Jonas Gustavsson, Färjestads BK
Guldhjälmen: Johan Davidsson, HV71
Honken Trophy: Johan Holmqvist, Frölunda HC
Håkan Loob Trophy: Per-Åge Skrøder, Modo Hockey
Salming Trophy: Marcus Ragnarsson, Djurgårdens IF
Rookie of the Year: Victor Hedman, Modo Hockey
Guldpipan: Marcus Vinnerborg, Ljungby

== Records ==
- January 5, 2009 – Chris Abbott, forward with Rögle BK, scored four goals in a single game against HV71, tying the current record.
- January 31, 2009 – Johan Harju, centre with Luleå HF, scored four goals in a single against Brynäs IF, tying the current record.

== See also ==
- 2008 in sports
- 2009 in sports
