= List of Färjestad BK players selected in the NHL entry draft =

This is a List of drafted Färjestad BK players, players who has been drafted in the NHL entry draft and played the season prior to the draft for Färjestad BK. Players are listed according to year of draft, and then by overall position drafted.

== Drafted players ==
	Player	Nationality	Drafted by	Year	Round	Overall
W	Harald Luckner	Sweden	New York Islanders	1977	7th	121st
D	Bjorn Olsson	Sweden	St. Louis Blues	1977	9th	147th
C	Bengt-Ake Gustafsson	Sweden	Washington Capitals	1978	4th	55th
F	Dan Hermansson	Sweden	St. Louis Blues	1978	10th	175th
W	Hakan Loob	Sweden	Calgary Flames	1980	9th	181st
W	Jan Ingman	Sweden	Montreal Canadiens	1981	1st	19th
D	Hakan Nordin	Sweden	St. Louis Blues	1981	2nd	36th
LW	Magnus Roupe	Sweden	Philadelphia Flyers	1982	9th	182nd
C	Thomas Rundkvist	Sweden	Montreal Canadiens	1983	10th	198th
RW	Lars Karlsson	Sweden	Detroit Red Wings	1984	8th	152nd
D	Fredrik Olausson	Sweden	Winnipeg Jets	1985	4th	81st
C	Bo Svanberg	Sweden	Detroit Red Wings	1985	11th	218th
W	Daniel Rydmark	Sweden	Los Angeles Kings	1989	6th	123rd
D	Mattias Olsson	Sweden	Los Angeles Kings	1991	10th	218th
C	Mathias Johansson	Sweden	Calgary Flames	1992	3rd	54th
RW	Jonas Hoglund	Sweden	Calgary Flames	1992	10th	222nd
D	Anders Myrvold	Norway	Quebec Nordiques	1993	5th	127th
D	Henrik Rehnberg	Sweden	New Jersey Devils	1995	4th	96th
LW	Jan Laabraten	Sweden	Calgary Flames	1995	4th	98th
RW	Kristian Huselius	Sweden	Florida Panthers	1997	2nd	47th
D	Jonas Elofsson	Sweden	Edmonton Oilers	1997	4th	94th
LW	Magnus Arvedson	Sweden	Ottawa Senators	1997	5th	119th
LW	Christian Berglund	Sweden	New Jersey Devils	1998	2nd	37th
LW	Peter Nordstrom	Sweden	Boston Bruins	1998	3rd	78th
C	Rickard Wallin	Sweden	Phoenix Coyotes	1998	6th	160th
D	Jonas Frogren	Sweden	Calgary Flames	1998	8th	206th
D	Pelle Prestberg	Sweden	Mighty Ducks of Anaheim	1998	9th	233rd
C	Tore Vikingstad	Norway	St. Louis Blues	1999	6th	180th
LW	Andreas Jamtin	Sweden	Detroit Red Wings	2001	5th	157th
LW	Marius Holtet	Norway	Dallas Stars	2002	2nd	42nd
D	Robin Jonsson	Sweden	St. Louis Blues	2002	4th	120th
D	Pierre Johnsson	Sweden	Calgary Flames	2002	7th	207th
D	Per Johnsson	Sweden	Calgary Flames	2006	7th	209th
D	Johan Motin	Sweden	Edmonton Oilers	2008	4th	103rd
C	Marcus Johansson	Sweden	Washington Capitals	2009	1st	24th
F	Henrik Bjorklund	Sweden	Calgary Flames	2009	4th	111th
G	Johan Gustafsson	Sweden	Minnesota Wild	2010	6th	159th
D	Jonas Brodin	Sweden	Minnesota Wild	2011	1st	10th
D	Oscar Klefbom	Sweden	Edmonton Oilers	2011	1st	19th
D	Magnus Nygren	Sweden	Montreal Canadiens	2011	4th	113th
D	Calle Andersson	Sweden	New York Rangers	2012	4th	119th
F	Max Gortz	Sweden	Nashville Predators	2012	6th	172nd
LW	Matej Paulovic	Slovakia	Dallas Stars	2013	5th	149th
D	Wilhelm Westlund	Sweden	Colorado Avalanche	2013	7th	183rd
C	Joel Eriksson Ek	Sweden	Minnesota Wild	2015	1st	20th
D	Oliver Kylington	Sweden	Calgary Flames	2015	2nd	60th
C	Rasmus Asplund	Sweden	Buffalo Sabres	2016	2nd	33rd
G	Adam Werner	Sweden	Colorado Avalanche	2016	5th	131st
C	Oskar Steen	Sweden	Boston Bruins	2016	6th	165th
LW	Fabian Zetterlund	Sweden	New Jersey Devils	2017	3rd	63rd
G	Olle Eriksson Ek	Sweden	Anaheim Ducks	2017	5th	153rd
C	Oskar Back	Sweden	Dallas Stars	2018	3rd	75th
D	Albert Johansson	Sweden	Detroit Red Wings	2019	2nd	60th
D	Leo Lööf	Sweden	St. Louis Blues	2020	3rd	88th
LW	Lucas Forsell	Sweden	Vancouver Canucks	2021	7th	201st
D	Joel Nystrom	Sweden	Carolina Hurricanes	2021	7th	219th
G	Dennis Hildeby	Sweden	Toronto Maple Leafs	2022	4th	122nd
G	Damian Clara	Italy	Anaheim Ducks	2023	4th	60th
D	Albert Wikman	Sweden	Florida Panthers	2023	4th	127th

== See also ==
- NHL entry draft
