= 2009–10 HV71 season =

Swedish ice hockey club season

2009–10 HV71
- Elitserien champions
- League: 1st SHL
- 2009–10 record: 23–16–14
- Home record: 17–5–6
- Road record: 8–11–8
- Goals for: 188
- Goals against: 155

Team information
- General manager: Fredrik Stillman
- Coach: Janne Karlsson
- Captain: Johan Davidsson
- Alternate captains: Per Gustafsson; David Petrasek
- Arena: Kinnarps Arena
- Average attendance: 6,939 (99%)

Team leaders
- Goals: Martin Thörnberg (20)
- Assists: Johan Davidsson (46)
- Points: Johan Davidsson (58)
- Penalty minutes: Teemu Laine (122)
- Wins: Stefan Liv (23)
- Goals against average: Stefan Liv (2.60)

The 2009–10 HV71 season saw HV71's attempt to win the Swedish Championship title after having lost the previous season's final, which they succeeded to do. It was the 26th season in the Swedish elite league Elitserien for the club.

HV71 won the playoffs, beating Timrå IK 4–1 in the quarter final series, Skellefteå AIK 4–1 in the semi-final series, and Djurgårdens IF 4–2 in the final series.

HV71 started the season in the beginning of August playing in the Nordic Trophy, which that year only consisted of Swedish teams. After having won the tournament round-robin stage, HV71 lost against Linköpings HC in the semi-final but clinched the bronzed medal defeating Frölunda HC. HV71 was also rewarded with 30,000 euro; 20,000 for winning the series and 10,000 for the bronze medal. On September 21, HV71 played its first game of the season, defeating Linköpings HC away with the score 6–2.

After 54 games of the regular season, HV71 lead the league table with one point over the second placed team, Linköpings HC. The last game of the regular season, HV71 faced Linköping away and managed to tie the game and win the regular season championship.

== Offseason ==
January 16: Defenseman Lance Ward signed a two-year deal with HV71.

April 10: Defenseman Per Gustafsson and goaltender Andreas Andersson re-signed with HV71. Both agreed to a one-year extension.

April 14: Janne Karlsson signed for three years as head coach for HV71. HV71's previous head coach, Kent Johansson, signed earlier with the Swiss team HC Lugano.

April 17: Forwards David Ullström and Simon Önerud, and defenseman Nichlas Torp re-signed with HV71 for another two years.

April 20: Defenseman Johan Björk and winger Johan Lindström re-signed with HV71. Both agreed to a two-year extension. Forward and junior player André Petersson signed with HV71 for a one-year deal.

April 23: Finnish power forward Teemu Laine agreed with HV71 for a two-year extension. Goalie Stefan Liv re-signed with HV71 for another year.

April 24: Forward Oscar Sundh signed with HV71 for two years.

April 28: Canadian centre Kris Beech re-signed with HV71 for another two years.

April 29: Forward Per Ledin returned from play in NHL and AHL, and signed a six-year deal with HV71.

May 20: Forward Mattias Tedenby re-signed with HV71 and agreed to a two-year extension.

August 16: Finnish defenseman Janne Niinimaa signed with HV71 for one year.

== Pre-season ==
HV71 began the pre-season playing in the Nordic Trophy tournament, a total of five games plus two playoff games, from August 11 to August 30, 2009.

=== Nordic Trophy ===
==== Standings ====
Nordic Trophy	GP	W	L	T	OTW	OTL	PSW	PSL	GF	GA	Pts
y-HV71	5	4	1	0	0	0	0	0	20	9	12
y-Frölunda HC	5	3	2	0	0	0	0	0	17	14	9
y-Djurgårdens IF	5	2	2	1	0	1	0	0	13	11	7
y-Linköpings HC	5	1	2	2	1	0	0	1	12	13	6
x-Färjestads BK	5	2	3	0	0	0	0	0	9	14	6
x-Malmö Redhawks	5	1	3	1	0	0	1	0	9	19	5

y - clinched semi-final spot for championship, x - play for 5th place

==== Game log ====
2009 Nordic Trophy game log

4–1–0 (Home: 3–0–0; Road: 1–1–0)
#	Date	Visitor	Score	Home	OT	Decision	Attendance	Record	Pts	Recap
1	August 11	HV71	5 – 2	Linköpings HC		Liv	1,402	1–0–0	3
2	August 14	Färjestads BK	0 – 6	HV71		Andersson	1,950	2–0–0	6
3	August 17	Frölunda HC	3 – 5	HV71		Liv	1,250	3–0–0	9
4	August 18	HV71	1 – 2	Malmö Redhawks		Andersson	1,802	3–1–0	9
5	August 20	Djurgårdens IF	2 – 3	HV71		Liv	1,000	4–1–0	12

Legend: Win (3 points) Overtime win (2 point) Loss (0 points) Overtime loss (1 point)

==== Playoffs ====
2009 Nordic Trophy Playoffs

#	Date	Visitor	Score	Home	OT	Decision	Attendance	Playoff	Recap
1	August 28	Linköpings HC	3 – 1	HV71		Liv		Lost semi-final
2	August 29	Frölunda HC	1 – 5	HV71		Liv	348	Won bronze medal

Legend: Win Overtime win Loss

== Regular season ==
HV71 won the regular season league title after a last game tie with Linköpings HC.

=== Standings ===
Elitserien	GP	W	L	T	OTW	OTL	GF	GA	Pts
y – HV71	55	25	16	5	6	3	188	155	95
x – Djurgårdens IF	55	26	17	7	2	3	161	130	92
x – Linköpings HC	55	27	20	3	3	2	163	139	92
x – Skellefteå AIK	55	26	20	4	1	4	146	141	88
x – Färjestads BK	55	25	20	3	2	5	132	144	87
x – Brynäs IF	55	20	17	11	6	1	144	124	84
x – Frölunda HC	55	22	22	9	1	1	155	156	78
x – Timrå IK	55	18	19	8	3	7	138	150	75
e – Modo Hockey	55	16	20	8	7	4	161	150	74
e – Luleå HF	55	19	23	2	4	7	139	143	74
r – Södertälje SK	55	14	27	4	7	3	131	176	63
r – Rögle BK	55	13	30	2	4	6	127	173	55

x – clinched playoff spot; y – clinched regular season league title; e – eliminated from playoff contention; r – played in relegation series

=== Game log ===
2009–10 Game log

September: 4–0–0 (Home: 2–0–0; Road: 2–0–0)
#	Date	Visitor	Score	Home	OT	Decision	Attendance	Record	Pts	Recap
4	September 21	HV71	6 – 2	Linköpings HC		Liv	8,205	1–0–0	3
1	September 24	Djurgårdens IF	6 – 7	HV71		Liv	6,856	2–0–0	6
2	September 26	HV71	4 – 2	Rögle BK		Liv	5,005	3–0–0	9
3	September 28	Modo Hockey	1 – 3	HV71		Liv	7,000	4–0–0	12

October: 7–4–1 (Home: 7–0–0; Road: 0–4–1)
#	Date	Visitor	Score	Home	OT	Decision	Attendance	Record	Pts	Recap
5	October 3	Timrå IK	4 – 6	HV71		Liv	6,961	5–0–0	15
6	October 6	HV71	1 – 2	Brynäs IF		Liv	8,120	5–1–0	15
7	October 8	Färjestads BK	0 – 8	HV71		Liv	6,953	6–1–0	18
8	October 10	HV71	2 – 3	Skellefteå AIK		Andersson	5,154	6–2–0	18
9	October 15	Södertälje SK	2 – 4	HV71		Liv	6,751	7–2–0	21
10	October 17	Luleå HF	4 – 5	HV71		Liv	7,000	8–2–0	24
16	October 20	HV71	2 – 3	Djurgårdens IF		Liv	6,788	8–3–0	24
11	October 22	Frölunda HC	1 – 4	HV71		Liv	7,000	9–3–0	27
12	October 24	HV71	4 – 3	Timrå IK	OT	Andersson	4,629	9–3–1	29
13	October 27	Rögle BK	3 – 5	HV71		Andersson	6,977	10–3–1	32
14	October 29	HV71	3 – 5	Södertälje SK		Liv	3,711	10–4–1	32
15	October 31	Brynäs IF	0 – 3	HV71		Liv	7,000	11–4–1	35

November: 3–4–3 (Home: 1–2–1; Road: 2–2–2)
#	Date	Visitor	Score	Home	OT	Decision	Attendance	Record	Pts	Recap
17	November 10	HV71	3 – 5	Luleå HF		Liv	4,986	11–5–1	35
18	November 12	Frölunda HC	2 – 2	HV71	OT	Andersson	7,000	11–5–2	36
19	November 14	HV71	5 – 4	Modo Hockey	OT	Andersson	5,928	11–5–3	38
20	November 16	Linköpings HC	4 – 6	HV71		Liv	6,977	12–5–3	41
21	November 19	HV71	5 – 0	Färjestads BK		Liv	6,973	13–5–3	44
22	November 21	Skellefteå AIK	3 – 2	HV71		Liv	6,962	13–6–3	44
23	November 24	HV71	3 – 0	Frölunda HC		Liv	12,019	14–6–3	47
24	November 26	Timrå IK	2 – 0	HV71		Liv	6,861	14–7–3	47
25	November 28	HV71	4 – 3	Skellefteå AIK	OT	Liv	5,433	14–7–4	49
31	November 30	HV71	2 – 5	Linköpings HC		Liv	8,414	14–8–4	49

December: 6–1–1 (Home: 3–1–1; Road: 3–0–0)
#	Date	Visitor	Score	Home	OT	Decision	Attendance	Record	Pts	Recap
26	December 3	Södertälje SK	4 – 5	HV71	OT	Liv	6,857	14–8–5	51
27	December 5	HV71	4 – 2	Rögle BK		Liv	4,292	15–8–5	54
28	December 8	MODO Hockey	4 – 1	HV71		Liv	7,000	15–9–5	54
29	December 10	HV71	3 – 2	Brynäs IF		Liv	4,926	16–9–5	57
30	December 12	Färjestads BK	1 – 7	HV71		Liv	7,000	17–9–5	60
32	December 26	Luleå HF	1 – 2	HV71		Liv	7,000	18–9–5	63
33	December 28	Djurgårdens IF	2 – 3	HV71		Andersson	7,000	19–9–5	66
34	December 30	HV71	4 – 3	Färjestads BK		Andersson	6,362	20–9–5	69

January: 3–4–4 (Home: 1–2–2; Road: 2–2–2)
#	Date	Visitor	Score	Home	OT	Decision	Attendance	Record	Pts	Recap
35	January 2	Brynäs IF	3 – 4	HV71	OT	Andersson	7,000	20–9–6	71
36	January 5	HV71	2 – 2	Frölunda HC	OT	Liv	12,009	20–9–7	72
37	January 7	HV71	4 – 3	Luleå HF		Liv	4,595	21–9–7	75
38	January 9	HV71	4 – 5	Södertälje SK	OT	Liv	2,933	21–9–8	76
39	January 14	Skellefteå AIK	1 – 3	HV71		Liv	6,886	22–9–8	79
40	January 16	HV71	2 – 4	Timrå IK		Andersson	5,093	22–10–8	79
41	January 21	Linköpings HC	3 – 2	HV71		Liv	7,000	22–11–8	79
42	January 23	HV71	5 – 1	Rögle BK		Liv	6,954	23–11–8	82
43	January 25	Djurgårdens IF	3 – 3	HV71	OT	Liv	7,272	23–11–9	83
44	January 28	MODO Hockey	5 – 1	HV71		Liv	6,183	23–12–9	83
45	January 30	HV71	2 – 4	Södertälje SK		Liv	6,940	23–13–9	83

February: 1–1–2 (Home: 1–1–0; Road: 0–0–2)
#	Date	Visitor	Score	Home	OT	Decision	Attendance	Record	Pts	Recap
46	February 4	HV71	2 – 2	Timrå IK	OT	Liv	6,618	23–13–10	84
47	February 6	Skellefteå AIK	3 – 2	HV71		Liv	5,100	23–14–10	84
48	February 8	Djurgårdens IF	3 – 5	HV71		Liv	6,950	24–14–10	87
49	February 27	HV71	3 – 4	Rögle BK	OT	Andersson	3,889	24–14–11	88

March: 1–2–3 (Home: 1–0–2; Road: 0–2–1)
#	Date	Visitor	Score	Home	OT	Decision	Attendance	Record	Pts	Recap
50	March 2	HV71	3 – 7	Frölunda HC		Liv	11,295	25–15–11	91
51	March 4	Luleå HF	3 – 5	HV71		Liv	6,846	25–15–11	91
52	March 6	Modo Hockey	3 – 2	HV71	OT	Liv	7,000	25–15–12	92
53	March 8	HV71	0 – 3	Brynäs IF		Liv	5,462	25–16–12	92
54	March 11	Färjestads BK	2 – 2	HV71	OT	Liv	6,944	25–16–13	93
55	March 13	HV71	4 – 3	Linköpings HC	OT	Liv	5,100	25–16–14	95

Legend: Win (3 points) Overtime win (2 point) Loss (0 points) Overtime loss (1 point) Tie (1 point)

== Playoffs ==
As winner of the regular series, HV71 received first pick to choose opponent for the quarterfinals. HV71 chose the 8th seed, Timrå IK. HV71 beat Timrå IK in five games, winning the series with 4–1 in games. For the semifinals, HV71 met Skellefteå AIK, the lowest seeded team remaining from the quarterfinals. In five games, HV71 won the semifinals and advanced to the finals where they met Djurgårdens IF, the regular season runner-up. In six games, where all but one game were decided in overtime, HV71 won their fourth Swedish Championship.

2010 Elitserien playoffs

Quarterfinals: vs. (8) Timrå IK - HV71 win series, 4–1
#	Date	Visitor	Score	Home	OT	Decision	Attendance	Series	Recap
1	March 18	HV71	3 – 2	Timrå IK	OT	Liv	5,512	HV71 lead 1–0
2	March 20	Timrå IK	2 – 3	HV71	OT	Liv	7,000	HV71 lead 2–0
3	March 22	HV71	3 – 6	Timrå IK		Liv	5,651	HV71 lead 2–1
4	March 24	Timrå IK	0 – 2	HV71		Liv	6,941	HV71 lead 3–1
5	March 26	Timrå IK	2 – 4	HV71		Liv	6,968	HV71 win series, 4–1

Semifinals: vs. (4) Skellefteå AIK - HV71 win series, 4–1
#	Date	Visitor	Score	Home	OT	Decision	Attendance	Series	Recap
1	April 1	HV71	2 – 0	Skellefteå AIK		Liv	5,014	HV71 lead 1–0
2	April 3	Skellefteå AIK	5 – 3	HV71		Liv	7,000	Tied 1–1
3	April 5	HV71	3 – 2	Skellefteå AIK	OT	Liv	6,001	HV71 lead 2–1
4	April 7	Skellefteå AIK	2 – 3	HV71	OT	Liv	7,000	HV71 lead 3–1
5	April 8	Skellefteå AIK	1 – 4	HV71		Liv	7,000	HV71 win series, 4–1

Finals: vs. (2) Djurgårdens IF - HV71 win series, 4–2
#	Date	Visitor	Score	Home	OT	Decision	Attendance	Series	Recap
1	April 15	HV71	3 – 4	Djurgårdens IF		Liv	8,094	Djurgårdens IF lead 1–0
2	April 17	Djurgårdens IF	3 – 4	HV71	OT	Liv	7,000	Tied 1–1
3	April 19	HV71	2 – 1	Djurgårdens IF	OT	Liv	13,850	HV71 lead 2–1
4	April 21	Djurgårdens IF	3 – 2	HV71	OT	Liv	7,000	Tied 2–2
5	April 22	Djurgårdens IF	4 – 5	HV71	OT	Liv	7,000	HV71 lead 3–2
6	April 24	HV71	3 – 2	Djurgårdens IF	OT	Liv	8,094	HV71 win series, 4–2

Legend: Win Overtime win Loss Overtime loss

== Player stats ==
=== Skaters ===
Note: GP = Games played; G = Goals; A = Assists; Pts = Points; +/- = Plus–minus; PIM = Penalties in Minutes

Regular season

Player	GP	G	A	Pts	+/-	PIM
Johan Davidsson	55	12	46	58	19	18
David Petrasek	52	15	38	53	15	103
Pasi Puistola	54	13	26	39	10	99
Martin Thörnberg	52	20	18	38	17	42
Jukka Voutilainen	37	16	21	37	9	10
Björn Melin	55	14	22	36	0	32
Teemu Laine	45	15	14	29	0	120
Per Ledin	47	9	18	27	3	116
Andreas Falk	55	13	12	25	6	64
Johan Lindström	48	12	12	24	6	12

Updated after the end of the regular season.

Playoffs

Player	GP	G	A	Pts	+/-	PIM

=== Goaltenders ===
Note: GP = Games played; TOI = Time on ice (minutes); W = Wins; L = Losses; T = Ties; OTW = Overtime Wins; OTL = Overtime Losses GA = Goals against; SO = Shutouts; Sv% = Save percentage; GAA = Goals against average

Regular season

Player	GP	TOI	W	L	T	OTW	OTL	GA	SO	Sv%	GAA
Stefan Liv	43	2542	23	15	3	3	1	110	4	90.87	2.60
Andreas Andersson	13	785	3	2	1	3	1	41	0	89.07	3.13

Updated after the end of the regular season.

Playoffs

Player	GP	TOI	W	L	T	OTW	OTL	GA	SO	Sv%	GAA

== Transactions ==
Acquired by HV71
Player	Former team	Contract terms
Lance Ward	Frankfurt Lions	2 years
André Petersson	HV71 youth	1 year
Oscar Sundh	Timrå IK	2 years
Per Ledin	Colorado Avalanche	6 years
Janne Niinimaa	SCL Tigers	1 year

Leaving HV71
Player	New team
Kim Staal	Malmö Redhawks
Henrik Eriksson	VIK Västerås HK
Jonas Johansson	VIK Västerås HK
Nicholas Angell	Frankfurt Lions
Mikko Luoma	Atlant Moscow Oblast
Kamil Piros	Ässät

== Roster ==
Goaltenders: 1 – Stefan Liv; 30 – Christoffer Bengtsberg; 35 – Andreas Andersson	Defensemen: 7 – Per Gustafsson - A; 8 – Daniel Grillfors; 19 – Johan Björk; 21 – Pasi Puistola; 22 – David Petrasek - A; 27 – Johan Halvardsson; 28 – Adam Almqvist; 38 – Nichlas Torp; 44 – Janne Niinimaa; 47 – Lance Ward	Wingers: 9 – Mattias Tedenby; 10 – Martin Thörnberg; 11 – Johan Lindström; 13 – Oscar Sundh; 26 – Simon Önerud; 39 – Jukka Voutilainen; 40 – André Petersson; 91 – Björn Melin; 92 – Teemu Laine; 97 – Per Ledin	Centers: 16 – Kris Beech; 17 – Andreas Falk; 20 – Johan Linnander; 24 – David Ullström; 76 – Johan Davidsson - C; GM: Fredrik Stillman; Coach: Janne Karlsson

== Draft picks ==
HV71 players picked at the 2010 NHL entry draft.

Round	#	Player	Position	Nationality	NHL team
