= 2007 IIHF Men's InLine Hockey World Championship =

International sports tournament

Tournament details
- Host country: Germany
- Venues: 2 (in 2 host cities)
- Dates: May 26 – June 1
- Teams: 16

Final positions
- Champions: Sweden (3rd title)
- Runners-up: Finland
- Third place: Germany

Tournament statistics
- Games played: 46
- Goals scored: 450 (9.78 per game)
- Attendance: 22,486 (489 per game)
- Scoring leader: (Germany) Michael Wolf – 7 goals

Awards
- MVP: (Slovenia) Gasper Kroselj

The 2007 Men's World Ice Hockey Championships was the 12th such event hosted by the International Ice Hockey Federation.

The tournament was divided into two divisions, the top division, for the teams ranked 1st–8th in the world. Additionally, Division I consisted of the teams ranked 9th–16th in the world. All 16 teams would be eligible to win the top division world championship. At the conclusion of pool play, the last placed teams in pools A & B played in cross-over games against the winners of pool C & D. The winners advanced to the playoff in the top division, while the losers were entered into the Division I playoff round.

== Top Division ==
=== Preliminary round ===
==== Group A ====
Team	Pld	W	OTW	OTL	L	GF	GA	GD	Pts
Germany	3	2	0	0	1	22	8	+14	6
United States	3	2	0	0	1	20	9	+11	6
Czech Republic	3	2	0	0	1	10	17	−7	6
Austria	3	0	0	0	3	6	24	−18	0

May 26, 2007; 20:00	Germany	10–0 (2–0, 3–0, 1–0,4–0)	Czech Republic	Landshut, Germany; Attendance: 3,126

Game reference
Florian Jung (1) 6:56 (PP)(GWG); Michael Wolf (1) 11:10 (PP); Boris Blank (1) 13:03 (ES); Michael Wolf (2) 15:23 (ES); Michael Wolf (3) 20:36 (ES); Aleksander Polaczek (1) 35:11 (ES); Michael Wolf (4) 39:05 (ES); Boris Blank (2) 40:14 (ES); Lukas Slavetinsky (1) 45:19 (ES); Daniel Huhn (1) 47:31 (PP) / Goals

May 27, 2007; 18:00	United States	3–4 (2–1, 1–0, 0–2, 0–1)	Czech Republic	Passau, Germany; Attendance: 1,200

Game reference
Brian Yingling (1) 0:15 (ES); Aaron Moss (1) 1:04 (ES); Brian Yingling (2) 18:39 (PP) / Goals / Martin Piecha (1) 11:30 (PP); Josef Fojtek (1) 25:56 (ES); Martin Koudelka (1) 29:58 (ES); Martin Koudelka (2) 47:58 (ES)(GWG)

May 27, 2007; 20:00	Germany	8–1 (0–0, 2–0, 1–0, 5–1)	Austria	Passau, Germany; Attendance: 1,890

Game reference
Daniel Menge (1) 14:50 (ES); Patrick Reimer (1) 22:09 (ES)(GWG); Patrick Reimer (2) 32:42 (ES); Bjorn Fridel (1) 36:35 (ES); Aleksander Polaczek (2) 37:17 (ES); Boris Blank (3) 37:28 (ES); Florian Jung (2) 39:24 (SH); Aleksander Polaczek (3) 41:16 (ES) / Goals / Gregor Baumgartner (1) 39:32 (PP)

May 28, 2007; 20:00	Austria	1–10 (1–1, 0–3, 0–6, 0–0)	United States	Passau, Germany; Attendance: 300

Game reference
Michael Pollross (1) 5:12 (PP) / Goals / Aaron Moss (2) 3:58 (ES); Thomas Bruce (1) 18:30 (ES)(GWG); Brian Yingling (3) 18:45 (ES); Greg Thompson (1) 20:39 (ES); Brian Yingling (4) 26:23 (ES); Aaron Moss (3) 28:01 (PP); Thomas Bruce (2) 29:30 (ES); James Beilsten (1) 31:10 (SH); Jamie Yoder (1) 33:25 (ES); Derek Kern (1) 35:27 (PP)

May 29, 2007; 18:00	Czech Republic	6–4 (2–0, 3–0, 0–2, 1–2)	Austria	Passau, Germany; Attendance: 300

Game reference
Jiri Polansky (1) 10:42 (ES); Jiri Polansky (2) 11:27 (PP); Zdenek Kubica (1) 19:02 (ES); Patrick Sebek (1) 21:04 (ES); Pavel Strycek (1) 22:36 (PP)(GWG); Patrick Sebek (2) 45:14 (ES) / Goals / Gregor Baumgartner (2) 25:29 (ES); Martin Sturm (1) 31:10 (PP); Gregor Baumgartner (3) 44:30 (ES); Gregor Baumgartner (4) 46:46 (ES)

May 29, 2007; 20:00	United States	7–4 (3–2, 2–0, 1–2, 1–0)	Germany	Passau, Germany; Attendance: 1,800

Game reference
Daniel Constanza (1) 2:04 (ES); Charlie Yoder (1) 4:26 (PP); James Beilsten (2) 4:48 (ES); Brian Yingling (5) 13:56 (PP); Ernest Hartlieb (1) 23:21 (PP)(GWG); Charlie Yoder (2) 30:26 (ES); Greg Thompson (2) 46:05 (PS) / Goals / Aleksander Polaczek (4) 1:05 (ES); Michael Wolf (5) 2:31 (ES); Michael Wolf (6) 24:46 (ES); Florian Jung (3) 32:22 (ES)

==== Group B ====
Team	Pld	W	OTW	OTL	L	GF	GA	GD	Pts
Slovenia	3	2	1	0	0	13	6	+7	8
Sweden	3	2	0	1	0	19	7	+12	7
Finland	3	1	0	0	2	11	9	+2	3
Slovakia	3	0	0	0	3	7	28	−21	0

May 27, 2007; 18:00	Slovenia	4 – 3 (2OT) (0–1, 1–0, 1–1, 1–1, 0–0, 1–0)	Sweden	Landshut, Germany; Attendance: 390

Game reference
Marjan Manfreda (1) 21:16 (ES); Domen Vedlin (1) 32:36 (ES); Marjan Manfreda (2) 36:38 (ES); Matic Kralj (1) 53:00 (ES)(GWG) / Goals / Johan Lilja (1) 10:51 (ES); Jonas Karlsson (1) 26:26 (ES); Daniel Borlin (1) 42:13 (ES)

May 27, 2007; 20:00	Finland	8–4 (2–0, 1–3, 1–0, 4–1)	Slovakia	Landshut, Germany; Attendance: 410

Game reference
Tuomas Valosaari (1) 4:07 (ES); Mikko Liukkonen (1) 7:05 (ES); Miika Lindholm (1) 20:05 (ES); Krister Pietsalo (1) 31:12 (PP); Kari Lohtander (1) 36:48 (ES)(GWG); Camilo Miettinen (1) 37:55 (ES); Jani Honkanen (1) 42:29 (ES); Aki Tuominen (1) 44:44 (PP) / Goals / Lukas Ruzicka (1) 17:46 (ES); Milan Bartovic (1) 19:14 (PP); Jakob Ruckay (1) 21:53 (ES); Jakob Ruckay (2) 41:46 (ES)

May 28, 2007; 18:00	Sweden	13–1 (4–1, 2–0, 6–0, 1–0)	Slovakia	Landshut, Germany; Attendance: 500

Game reference
Kristoffer Berglof (1) 4:31 (ES); Linus Klasen (1) 6:37 (PP)(GWG); Kristoffer Berglof (2) 8:25 (ES); Daniel Borlin (2) 10:23 (ES); Andreas Svensson (1) 13:51 (PP); Kristian Luukkonen (1) 19:00 (ES); Per Ledin (1) 24:40 (PP); Bjorn Eriksson (1) 25:50 (ES); Bjorn Eriksson (2) 27:22 (ES); Linus Klasen (2) 28:44 (ES); Kristoffer Berglof (3) 34:14 (ES); Simon Olsson (1) 35:42 (ES); Jimmy Anderson (1) 45:18 (SH) / Goals / Rudolf Tomanek (1) 1:39 (ES)

May 28, 2007; 20:00	Finland	1–2 (0–1, 0–0, 0–0, 1–1)	Slovenia	Landshut, Germany; Attendance: 850

Game reference
Aki Tuominen (2) 46:54 (PP) / Goals / Dejan Zemva (1) 7:23 (ES); Marjan Manfreda (3) 43:48 (PP)(GWG)

May 30, 2007; 12:00	Slovakia	2–7 (0–3, 0–1, 2–1, 0–2)	Slovenia	Landshut, Germany; Attendance: 100

Jakob Ruckay (3) 24:39 (ES); Milan Bartovic (2) 27:17 (ES) / Goals / Dejan Zemva (2) 3:18 (PP); Matic Kralj (2) 4:36 (PP); Tadej Nabergoj (1) 11:09 (ES)(GWG); Matic Kralj (3) 18:41 (ES); Domen Vedlin (2) 29:56 (ES); Denis Kadic (1) 36:47 (PP); Denis Kadic (2) 46:52 (ES)

May 30, 2007; 18:00	Sweden	3–2 (1–0, 0–0, 2–1, 0–1)	Finland	Landshut, Germany; Attendance: 200

Game reference
Per Ledin (2) 1:16 (ES); Johan Lilja (2) 32:44 (SH); Andreas Svensson (2) 35:20 (ES) / Goals / Camilo Miettinen (2) 28:49 (ES); Marco Virtala (1) 45:10 (ES)

=== Qualifying round ===
May 30, 2007; 20:00	Slovakia	7–4 (2–1, 3–0, 0–3, 2–0)	Brazil	Landshut, Germany; Attendance: 250

Game reference

Slovakia remains in Top Division, Brazil remains in Division I

May 30, 2007; 18:00	Austria	6 – 5 (OT) (0–1, 1–0, 2–1, 2–3, 1–0)	Great Britain	Passau, Germany; Attendance: 200

Game reference

Austria remains in Top Division, Great Britain remains in Division I

=== Championship Round ===
==== Draw ====
Quarterfinals
A3	Czech Republic	2
B2	Sweden	6
B4	Slovakia	2
A1	Germany	10
B3	Finland	7
A2	United States	4
A4	Austria	2*
B1	Slovenia	1

Semifinals
QF1	Sweden	5
QF2	Germany	2
QF3	Finland	6
QF4	Austria	5

Finals
SF2	Sweden	4*
SF1	Finland	3
Bronze medal game
SF1	Germany	6
SF2	Austria	3

Note: * denotes overtime period(s).

==== Placement games ====
June 1, 2007	United States	8 - 7 (OT)	Czech Republic

June 1, 2007	Slovenia	9 - 0	Slovakia

=== Ranking and statistics ===
2007 Men's World Inline Hockey

Championships Winners

Sweden

==== Tournament awards ====
- Best players selected by the directorate:
  - Best Goalkeeper: (Sweden) Pontus Sjogren
  - Best Defenseman: (Finland) Aki Tuominen
  - Best Forward: (Germany) Michael Wolf
  - Most Valuable Player: (Slovenia) Gasper Kroselj

==== Final standings ====
The final standings of the tournament according to IIHF:

Rk.	Team
1st place, gold medalist(s)	Sweden
2nd place, silver medalist(s)	Finland
3rd place, bronze medalist(s)	Germany
4.	Austria
5.	Slovenia
6.	United States
7.	Czech Republic
8.	Slovakia

== Division I ==
=== Preliminary round ===
==== Group C ====
Team	Pld	W	OTW	OTL	L	GF	GA	GD	Pts
Great Britain	3	3	0	0	0	22	7	+15	9
Japan	3	2	0	0	1	15	14	+1	6
Namibia	3	1	0	0	2	13	16	−3	3
South Africa	3	0	0	0	3	7	20	−13	0

May 27, 2007; 14:00	Japan	6–3 (1–1, 2–0, 2–1, 1–1)	Namibia	Passau, Germany

May 27, 2007; 16:00	South Africa	1–7 (0–3, 0–2, 1–1, 0–1)	Great Britain	Passau, Germany

May 28, 2007; 16:00	Japan	5–3 (2–1, 0–1, 2–1, 1–0)	South Africa	Passau, Germany

May 28, 2007; 18:00	Great Britain	7–2 (0–0, 5–1, 1–1, 1–0)	Namibia	Passau, Germany

May 29, 2007; 16:00	Great Britain	8–4 (3–2, 3–0, 0–1, 2–1)	Japan	Passau, Germany

May 29, 2007; 14:00	Namibia	8–3 (2–1, 4–1, 1–0, 1–1)	South Africa	Passau, Germany

==== Group D ====
Team	Pld	W	OTW	OTL	L	GF	GA	GD	Pts
Brazil	3	3	0	0	0	15	10	+5	9
Australia	3	2	0	0	1	26	13	+13	6
New Zealand	3	1	0	0	2	14	26	−12	3
Hungary	3	0	0	0	3	15	21	−6	0

May 27, 2007; 14:00	Brazil	6–5 (0–2, 3–0, 2–1, 1–2)	Australia	Landshut, Germany

May 27, 2007; 16:00	New Zealand	9–8 (3–3, 3–3, 2–2, 1–0)	Hungary	Landshut, Germany

May 28, 2007; 14:00	Brazil	5–3 (2–1, 1–0, 1–0, 1–2)	New Zealand	Landshut, Germany

May 28, 2007; 16:00	Hungary	5–8 (1–1, 1–1, 1–4, 2–2)	Australia	Landshut, Germany

May 30, 2007; 10:00	Hungary	2–4 (2–1, 0–1, 0–1, 0–1)	Brazil	Landshut, Germany

May 30, 2007; 16:00	Australia	13–2 (4–1, 3–1, 4–0, 2–0)	New Zealand	Landshut, Germany

=== Finals round ===
==== Draw ====
Quarterfinals
C3	Namibia	3
D2	Australia	5
D4	Hungary	4
C1	Great Britain	3
C2	Japan	4
D3	New Zealand	5
C4	South Africa	3
D1	Brazil	9

Semifinals
QF1	New Zealand	7
QF2	Australia	3
QF3	Brazil	7
QF4	Hungary	2

Finals
SF2	Brazil	5*
SF1	New Zealand	4
Bronze medal game
SF1	Hungary	6
SF2	Australia	5

==== Placement games ====
June 1, 2007	Japan	7 - 6	Namibia

June 1, 2007	Great Britain	11 - 2	South Africa

Note: * denotes overtime period(s).
