= Jonas Karlsson (disambiguation) =

Jonas Karlsson may refer to:

- Jonas Karlsson (born 1971), Swedish actor and author
- Jonas Karlsson (journalist) (born 1977), Swedish sports journalist with Sveriges Television
- Jonas Karlsson (ice hockey) (born 1986), Swedish ice hockey player
- Jonas W. Karlsson, Finnish music producer
