= Koudelka (surname) =

Koudelka (feminine: Koudelková) is a Czech surname. Notable people include:

- Drahomír Koudelka (1946–1992), Czech volleyball player
- Jan Koudelka (born 1992), Czech footballer
- Joan Koudelka (born 1948), South African tennis player
- Josef Koudelka (born 1938), Czech photographer
- Joseph Maria Koudelka (1852–1921), American Roman Catholic bishop
- Ken Koudelka, American musician
- Martin Koudelka (born 1976), Czech ice hockey player
- Roland Koudelka (1938–2016), Austrian curler
- Roman Koudelka (born 1989), Czech ski jumper
- Štěpán Koudelka (born 1945), Czech tennis player

== See also ==
- Kudelka
