= Kubic =

Kubic is a surname. Notable people with the surname include:

- Rick Kubic, Chicago-based percussionist
- Yanna Kubic (born 1976), Polish-born London-based conceptual artist

== See also ==
- Kubica
