= Kudelka =

Kudelka or Kudělka (feminine: Kudelková or Kudělková) is a surname. Notable people include:

- David Kudělka, Czech ice hockey player
- Frank Darío Kudelka (born 1961), Argentine football manager
- Frank Kudelka (1925–1993), American basketball player
- James Kudelka (born 1955), Canadian choreographer and dancer
- Jon Kudelka (1972–2026), Australian editorial cartoonist
- Tomáš Kudělka (born 1987), Czech ice hockey player

== See also ==
- Koudelka (surname)
