= Clas Eriksson =

Swedish ice hockey player

- Born: February 20, 1973 (age 53) Karlstad, Sweden
- Height: 5 ft 11 in (180 cm)
- Weight: 194 lb (88 kg; 13 st 12 lb)
- Position: Forward
- Shot: Left
- Played for: Färjestad BK
- Playing career: 1990–2004

Clas Eriksson (born February 20, 1973) is a Swedish former professional ice hockey player.

Eriksson is currently a team manager and coach for his former club Färjestads BK. During his career, Eriksson played for Färjestads BK, apart from 1 1/2 seasons with Grums IK from 1991 to 1992. During his 13 seasons with Färjestads, he won three Swedish Championships in 1997, 1998, and 2002. In 2004 he was forced to retire due to an injury.

== Personal life ==
Eriksson's son, Joel Eriksson Ek, currently plays within the Minnesota Wild organization of the National Hockey League, and has played in this organization since the 2016-17 season. and his younger son Olle was drafted by the Anaheim Ducks in the 2017 NHL entry draft.
