= Emil Kåberg =

Swedish ice hockey player

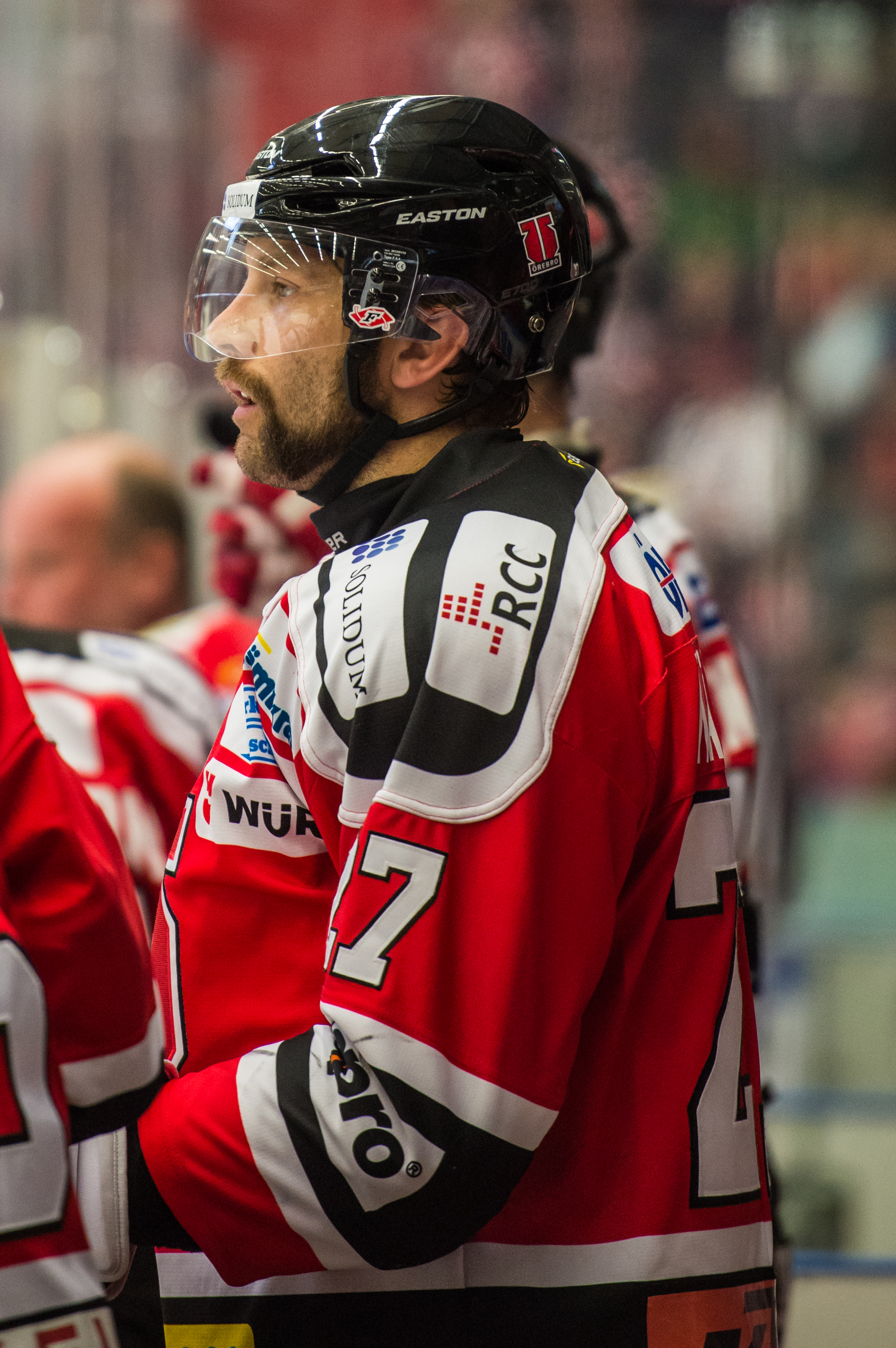
Kåberg in 2013.

Emil Karl Henry Kåberg (born February 2, 1978, in Hallsberg) is a Swedish former professional ice hockey player.

Kåberg is known for his physical game of playing and he was forming, together with his old linemate in Färjestad Per Ledin, a duo called the Bruise Brothers.

Kåberg played for the Allsvenskan club IFK Kumla from 1994 to 1995 and from 1996 to 2001. During the 1995/96 season and parts of the 1996–97 season Kåberg played for Frölunda HCs juniorteam, but he returned to Kumla in 1996. In the summer of 2001 he signed with Bofors IK, also an Allsvenskan club. He played with them for 2 1/2 seasons and became "the most hated player in Allsvenskan" . In January 2004 he was transferred to the Elitserien club Färjestads BK. In his first full season with Färjestad, 2004/05, he set the record for most penalty minutes in one season (regular season) in Elitserien with 203 PIM. In April 2006 he won his first Swedish Championship. On April 29, 2014, Kåberg officially announced his retirement as a player.

== Career statistics ==
			Regular season					Playoffs					Qualification
Season	Team	League	GP	G	A	Pts	PIM	GP	G	A	Pts	PIM	GP	G	A	Pts	PIM
1994-95	IFK Kumla	Allsvenskan	3	0	0	0	0	-	-	-	-	-	-	-	-	-	-
1996-97	IFK Kumla	Allsvenskan	15	1	0	1	37	-	-	-	-	-	-	-	-	-	-
1997-98	IFK Kumla	Allsvenskan	28	2	1	3	14	-	-	-	-	-	-	-	-	-	-
1998-99	IFK Kumla	Allsvenskan	36	9	8	17	120	5	0	0	0	12	-	-	-	-	-
1999-00	IFK Kumla	Allsvenskan	42	11	8	19	72	-	-	-	-	-	-	-	-	-	-
2000-01	IFK Kumla	Allsvenskan	40	6	6	12	104	-	-	-	-	-	-	-	-	-	-
2001-02	Bofors IK	Allsvenskan	43	9	4	13	129	6	2	0	2	4	-	-	-	-	-
2001-02	Bofors IK	Elitserien	-	-	-	-	-	-	-	-	-	-	10	0	0	0	55
2002-03	Bofors IK	Allsvenskan	41	5	3	8	108	2	0	0	0	2	-	-	-	-	-
2003-04	Bofors IK	Allsvenskan	35	7	7	14	78	-	-	-	-	-	-	-	-	-	-
2003-04	Färjestads BK	Elitserien	15	0	1	1	6	17	2	0	2	16	-	-	-	-	-
2004-05	Färjestads BK	Elitserien	47	3	3	6	213	15	0	0	0	84	-	-	-	-	-
2005-06	Färjestads BK	Elitserien	46	4	7	11	85	18	2	1	13	34	-	-	-	-	-
2006-07	Färjestads BK	Elitserien	55	7	7	14	106	9	1	3	4	41	-	-	-	-	-
2006-07	Färjestads BK	ECC	2	1	0	1	2	-	-	-	-	-	-	-	-	-	-
Elitserien totals			162	14	18	32	410	59	5	4	9	175	10	0	0	0	55
Allsvenskan totals								13	2	0	2	18	-	-	-	-	-
ECC totals			2	1	0	1	2	-	-	-	-	-	-	-	-	-	-

Statistics as of April 18, 2006.
