= Per Ledin =

Swedish professional ice hockey forward (born 1978)

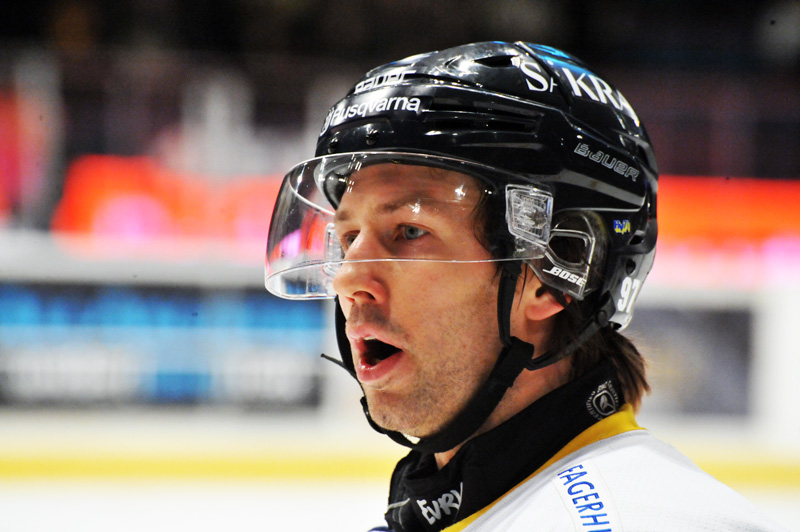
- Born: September 14, 1978 (age 48) Luleå, Sweden
- Height: 6 ft 0 in (183 cm)
- Weight: 194 lb (88 kg; 13 st 12 lb)
- Position: Left wing
- Shot: Left
- Played for: IF Björklöven; Luleå HF; Färjestads BK; HV71; Colorado Avalanche; EC Red Bull Salzburg; Lausanne HC; Karlskrona HK; Malmö Redhawks
- National team: Sweden
- NHL draft: Undrafted
- Playing career: 1998–2019

Pehr Gunnar Ledin (born September 14, 1978) is a Swedish former professional ice hockey forward. He most notably played with Luleå HF in the Swedish Hockey League (SHL) and enjoyed a brief career in the National Hockey League (NHL) with the Colorado Avalanche.

== Playing career ==
Ledin is known for his physical style of play and formed during the 2005–06 Elitserien season, together with linemate Emil Kåberg, a duo called The Bruise Brothers.

During 2006 Elitserien finals against the Frölunda Indians, Frölunda's fans started to chant "Kåbergs flickvän heter Per Ledin" ("Kåberg's girlfriend is named Per Ledin). The Bruise Brothers responded by posing for a photo after winning the final, covered in gold paint, presenting the cup and Ledin kissing Kåberg's chin.

Ledin started his professional career at the Swedish club IF Björklöven in the 1997–98 season. That season Björklöven played in the second highest league in Sweden, HockeyAllsvenskan, and was promoted to the highest league, Elitserien. The following season Björklöven was relegated from Elitserien and after another season with Björklöven in HockeyAllsvenskan, Ledin signed with the Baton Rouge Kingfish in the ECHL. In the middle of the season he returned to Sweden and signed with the Elitserien club Luleå HF. After a few disappointing seasons with Luleå, Ledin got his big breakthrough during the 2004–05 season when he scored 16 goals and 20 assists in 46 games during the regular season. This made the other clubs in Elitseriens interested and in the summer of 2005 he signed for the six times Swedish Champions Färjestads BK. With Ledin's first season with Färjestad the club won its seventh Swedish Championship.

In 2006, Ledin signed a contract with the Columbus Blue Jackets of the NHL, but the contract was rejected by the league due to errors in the contract. Instead, he continued and signed a three-year contract with HV71 in Elitserien. After fulfilling one season with HV71, winning the Swedish Championship, he broke his contract for play in the NHL. He signed a one-year contract with the Colorado Avalanche and was assigned to their AHL affiliate the Lake Erie Monsters.

Per spent the majority of the 2008–09 season with the Monsters until on April 8, 2009, when he was recalled to the Avalanche to replace injured Marek Svatos. He made his NHL debut at age 30 on April 9, 2009 in a 3–2 overtime loss at home against the Dallas Stars. He played the remaining three games that were left in the 08-09 season.

On April 29, 2009, Ledin left North America and signed a contract with his previous Swedish club, HV71. Ledin played in a checking role with HV71, claiming his third championship in his first season of his return in the 2009–10 season. After four seasons with HV71, Ledin sought a mutual release from the club, and returned to hometown team, Luleå HF, on a two-year contract on May 23, 2013.

After two season in Luleå, helping the club claim the first edition of the revamped Champions Hockey League, Ledin left Sweden for just the second time in his career, signing a contract with Austrian club Champions, EC Red Bull Salzburg on September 12, 2015. In helping Salzburg become repeat Austrian champions, he contributed with 36 points in 47 games in the EBEL.

On August 18, 2016, he agreed to a one-year contract with Swiss club, Lausanne HC of the National League A (NLA). On January 20, 2017, Ledin was sent down to the HC Red Ice of the National League B (NLB) after appearing in only 9 games (3 points) for Lausanne this season.

== International play ==
Medal record

Representing Sweden

Men's Inline Hockey

World Championships
Gold medal – first place	2007 Germany	

Ledin made his international debut in 2005 before finally appearing in his first IIHF tournament in a fourth-placed finish at the 2007 World Championships in Moscow, Russia. Ledin was also a member of the gold medal winning Swedish men's national inline hockey team at the 2007 Men's World Inline Hockey Championships.

== Career statistics ==
=== Regular season and playoffs ===
			Regular season					Playoffs
Season	Team	League	GP	G	A	Pts	PIM	GP	G	A	Pts	PIM
1997–98	IF Björklöven	Allsv	31	10	11	21	18	—	—	—	—	—
1998–99	IF Björklöven	SEL	46	6	4	10	32	—	—	—	—	—
1999–00	IF Björklöven	Allsv	37	12	6	18	65	4	1	3	4	2
2000–01	Baton Rouge Kingfish	ECHL	27	4	8	12	37	—	—	—	—	—
2000–01	Luleå HF	SEL	18	1	0	1	14	12	0	0	0	6
2001–02	Luleå HF	SEL	50	0	5	5	47	6	0	0	0	8
2002–03	Luleå HF	SEL	50	8	7	15	72	4	0	0	0	6
2003–04	Luleå HF	SEL	50	6	9	15	112	5	1	1	2	8
2004–05	Luleå HF	SEL	46	16	20	36	94	4	0	1	1	37
2005–06	Färjestads BK	SEL	46	8	15	23	123	18	3	7	10	55
2006–07	Färjestads BK	SEL	55	9	15	24	148	9	4	4	8	57
2007–08	HV71	SEL	52	16	17	33	137	17	2	5	7	63
2008–09	Lake Erie Monsters	AHL	58	11	12	23	55	—	—	—	—	—
2008–09	Colorado Avalanche	NHL	3	0	0	0	2	—	—	—	—	—
2009–10	HV71	SEL	47	9	18	27	116	12	0	1	1	4
2010–11	HV71	SEL	43	2	6	8	58	4	1	0	1	6
2011–12	HV71	SEL	46	7	14	21	62	6	1	0	1	18
2012–13	HV71	SEL	55	5	7	12	129	5	1	0	1	4
2013–14	Luleå HF	SHL	52	11	16	27	58	6	0	0	0	12
2014–15	Luleå HF	SHL	41	9	11	20	34	9	1	0	1	10
2015–16	EC Red Bull Salzburg	EBEL	47	13	23	36	48	19	3	5	8	20
2016–17	Lausanne HC	NLA	12	2	4	6	20	1	0	0	0	6
2016–17	HC Red Ice	NLB	2	2	0	2	2	—	—	—	—	—
2017–18	Karlskrona HK	SHL	14	0	1	1	10	—	—	—	—	—
2017–18	Luleå HF	SHL	6	0	0	0	0	2	0	0	0	0
2018–19	Brooklyn Tigers City	Div.2	1	1	3	4	0	—	—	—	—	—
2018–19	Bodens HF	Div.1	15	6	7	13	12	—	—	—	—	—
2018–19	Malmö Redhawks	SHL	3	0	0	0	2	2	0	0	0	0
SHL totals			720	113	165	278	1248	130	15	19	34	323
NHL totals			3	0	0	0	2	—	—	—	—	—

=== International ===
Year	Team	Event	Result	GP	G	A	Pts	PIM
2007	Sweden	WC	4th	7	0	5	5	4
Senior totals				7	0	5	5	4

== Awards and honors ==
Award	Year
SHL
Le Mat Trophy (Färjestads BK)	2006
Le Mat Trophy (HV71)	2008, 2010
