= Kubica =

Kubica is a Polish, Slovak and Czech surname. In Slovakia and the Czech Republic, it has a feminine form, Kubicová.

- Andrzej Kubica (born 1972), Polish football player
- Ján Kubica (born 1973), Slovak sprint canoer
- Krzysztof Kubica (born 2000), Polish football player
- Lubomír Kubica (born 1979), Czech football player
- Mikołaj Kubica (1945–2020), Polish gymnast
- Robert Kubica (born 1984), Polish Formula One driver
- Zdeněk Kubica (born 1986), Czech ice hockey player
