= Milan Bartovič =

Slovak ice hockey player (born 1981)

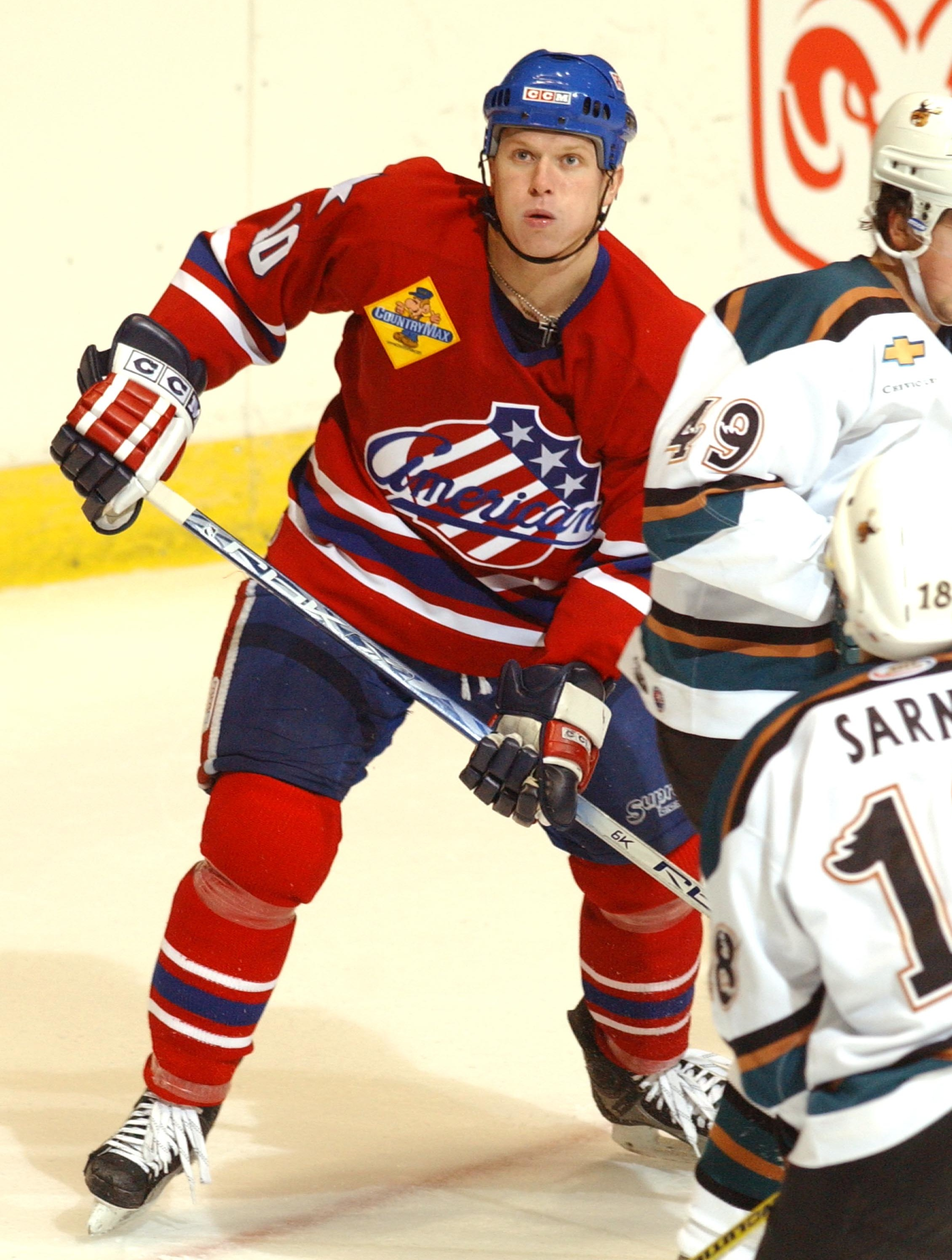
- Bartovič with the Rochester Americans in 2004
- Born: April 9, 1981 (age 45) Trenčín, Czechoslovakia
- Height: 6 ft 0 in (183 cm)
- Weight: 194 lb (88 kg; 13 st 12 lb)
- Position: Right wing
- Shot: Left
- Played for: Buffalo Sabres; Chicago Blackhawks; Malmö Redhawks; ZSC Lions; HC Bílí Tygři Liberec; Atlant Moscow Oblast; HC Slovan Bratislava; HC Vítkovice; HK Dukla Trenčín
- National team: Slovakia
- NHL draft: 35th overall, 1999; Buffalo Sabres
- Playing career: 2001–2020

Milan Bartovič (born April 9, 1981) is a Slovak former professional ice hockey left winger, who last played for HK Dukla Trenčín in the Slovak Extraliga. He was drafted 35th overall by the Buffalo Sabres in the 1999 NHL entry draft.

== Playing career ==
After playing junior hockey in the Western Hockey League for the Tri-City Americans and Brandon Wheat Kings, Bartovič began his professional career in 2001–02 with the Rochester Americans of the American Hockey League. Through 2004–05, Bartovič played in the National Hockey League for the Buffalo Sabres for a total of 26 games. On October 24, 2005, the Sabres traded Bartovič to the Chicago Blackhawks for goaltender Michael Leighton.

After playing 24 games for the Blackhawks and an additional 49 games with the Norfolk Admirals of the AHL, Bartovič became a free agent on July 1, 2006, and elected to play in Sweden for the 2006–07 season. In the summer of 2007, he signed a one-year deal with the Atlanta Thrashers before leaving to return to Europe the following season with Malmö IF of the Elitserien in Sweden.

On May 31, 2010, Bartovič signed a one-year contract as a free agent with Atlant Moscow Oblast of the Russian KHL.

Milan was a member of the Slovakia team that competed at the 2006 World Championships, and also was a member of the Slovakia men's national team inline hockey team that competed at the 2007 Men's World Inline Hockey Championships.

== Career statistics ==
=== Regular season and playoffs ===
			Regular season					Playoffs
Season	Team	League	GP	G	A	Pts	PIM	GP	G	A	Pts	PIM
1995–96	Dukla Trenčín	SVK U18	46	6	9	15	41	—	—	—	—	—
1996–97	Dukla Trenčín	SVK U18	52	21	33	54	32	—	—	—	—	—
1997–98	Dukla Trenčín	SVK U20	26	2	6	8	27	—	—	—	—	—
1998–99	Dukla Trenčín	SVK U20	46	36	35	71	62	—	—	—	—	—
1999–2000	Tri–City Americans	WHL	18	8	9	17	12	—	—	—	—	—
1999–2000	Brandon Wheat Kings	WHL	38	18	22	40	28	—	—	—	—	—
2000–01	Brandon Wheat Kings	WHL	34	15	25	40	40	6	1	2	3	8
2000–01	Rochester Americans	AHL	2	1	1	2	0	4	0	1	1	2
2001–02	Rochester Americans	AHL	73	15	11	26	56	2	0	0	0	0
2002–03	Rochester Americans	AHL	74	18	10	28	84	3	0	0	0	0
2002–03	Buffalo Sabres	NHL	3	1	0	1	0	—	—	—	—	—
2003–04	Rochester Americans	AHL	52	18	11	29	52	2	0	0	0	2
2003–04	Buffalo Sabres	NHL	23	1	8	9	18	—	—	—	—	—
2004–05	Rochester Americans	AHL	69	10	18	28	83	9	0	3	3	22
2005–06	Norfolk Admirals	AHL	49	10	14	24	34	3	0	0	0	8
2005–06	Chicago Blackhawks	NHL	24	1	6	7	8	—	—	—	—	—
2006–07	Malmö IF	SEL	24	1	4	5	26	—	—	—	—	—
2006–07	ZSC Lions	NLA	12	2	3	5	2	3	0	1	1	0
2007–08	Bílí Tygři Liberec	ELH	29	4	2	6	22	11	1	1	2	10
2008–09	Bílí Tygři Liberec	ELH	36	13	11	24	20	3	0	0	0	2
2009–10	Bílí Tygři Liberec	ELH	45	20	15	35	38	14	7	4	11	4
2010–11	Atlant Moscow Oblast	KHL	23	2	4	6	16	—	—	—	—	—
2010–11	Bílí Tygři Liberec	ELH	16	9	3	12	12	7	2	4	6	6
2011–12	Bílí Tygři Liberec	ELH	37	16	14	30	54	11	2	4	6	28
2012–13	HC Slovan Bratislava	KHL	47	9	8	17	20	4	0	1	1	2
2013–14	HC Slovan Bratislava	KHL	54	13	15	28	46	—	—	—	—	—
2014–15	HC Slovan Bratislava	KHL	54	10	11	21	22	—	—	—	—	—
2015–16	HC Slovan Bratislava	KHL	60	8	12	20	28	4	0	0	0	0
2016–17	Bílí Tygři Liberec	ELH	46	11	12	23	26	16	5	2	7	4
2017–18	Bílí Tygři Liberec	ELH	19	1	1	2	10	—	—	—	—	—
2017–18	HC Vítkovice Ridera	ELH	18	1	4	5	10	4	0	0	0	4
2018–19	HK Dukla Trenčín	SVK	54	15	25	40	40	6	2	0	2	0
2019–20	HK Dukla Trenčín	SVK	45	7	11	18	66	—	—	—	—	—
AHL totals			319	72	65	137	309	23	0	4	4	34
NHL totals			50	3	14	17	26	—	—	—	—	—
KHL totals			178	34	38	72	104	4	0	1	1	2

Medal record

Representing Slovakia

Ice hockey

World Championships
Silver medal – second place	2012 Finland	

IIHF U18 Championships
Bronze medal – third place	1999 Germany	

=== International ===
Year	Team	Event	Result	GP	G	A	Pts	PIM
1999	Slovakia	WJC18	3rd place, bronze medalist(s)	7	5	2	7	6
2000	Slovakia	WJC	9th	7	0	2	2	0
2001	Slovakia	WJC	8th	7	1	2	3	6
2006	Slovakia	WC	8th	7	2	4	6	8
2009	Slovakia	WC	10th	6	0	0	0	2
2010	Slovakia	WC	12th	6	2	2	4	2
2012	Slovakia	WC	2nd place, silver medalist(s)	10	3	0	3	6
2014	Slovakia	OG	11th	4	0	1	1	0
2015	Slovakia	WC	9th	7	1	0	1	16
Junior totals				21	6	6	12	12
Senior totals				40	8	7	15	34
