= Joel Eriksson Ek =

Swedish ice hockey player (born 1997)

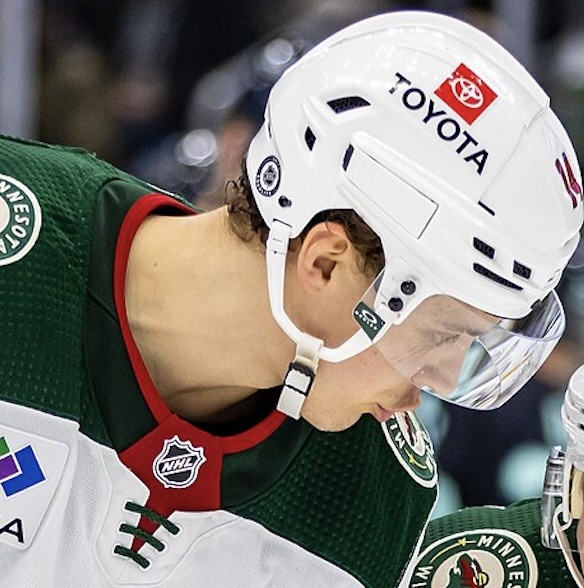
- Eriksson Ek with the Minnesota Wild in 2023
- Born: 29 January 1997 (age 29) Karlstad, Sweden
- Height: 6 ft 3 in (191 cm)
- Weight: 207 lb (94 kg; 14 st 11 lb)
- Position: Centre
- Shoots: Left
- NHL team Former teams: Minnesota Wild; Färjestad BK
- National team: Sweden
- NHL draft: 20th overall, 2015; Minnesota Wild
- Playing career: 2014–present

Joel Eriksson Ek (last name sometimes stylized as Eriksson-Ek, born 29 January 1997) is a Swedish professional ice hockey player who is a centre for the Minnesota Wild of the National Hockey League (NHL).

Born and raised in Sweden, Eriksson Ek played junior hockey for Färjestad BK in the J18 Elit and J20 Nationell league. He made his professional debut as a teenager with Färjestad BK during the 2014–15 SHL season. Eriksson Ek earned praise from hockey pundits throughout the season and entered the draft as one of the highest ranked international skaters. He was ultimately taken 20th overall by the Wild in the 2015 NHL entry draft. He did not immediately join the Wild, instead returning to Sweden and recording 15 points during the 2015–16 SHL season.

Eriksson Ek made his NHL debut with the Wild during the 2016–17 season and later became the first teenager in franchise history to record three assists in one game. Known for his strong two-way play, Eriksson Ek has established himself as a reliable centreman for the Wild, contributing both offensively and defensively. Over the years, he has become known for his physicality, defensive prowess, and ability to contribute points. Starting during the 2019–20 season, Eriksson Ek began playing on a line with Jordan Greenway and Marcus Foligno, which was aptly referred to as the GREEF line. They consistently found success and were considered the Wild's top shutdown line before Greenway was traded.

Internationally, Eriksson Ek has represented his home country Sweden at both the junior and senior levels, winning gold once at the 2017 IIHF World Championship.

== Personal life ==
Eriksson Ek was born on 29 January 1997, in Karlstad, Sweden, to Clas Eriksson and Anna Ek. He comes from a hockey playing family: his father Clas played with Färjestad BK for 13 seasons and his brother Olle was taken by the Anaheim Ducks in the 2017 NHL entry draft. Growing up, Eriksson Ek's favourite player was Peter Forsberg due to his playing skills as well as his dedication to the sport.

== Playing career ==
=== Sweden ===
Growing up in Sweden, Eriksson Ek played junior hockey for Färjestad BK in the J18 Elit and J20 Nationell league. He split the 2014–15 season between Färjestad BK's junior team in the J20 Nationell league and their senior team in the Swedish Hockey League (SHL). While playing in the SHL as a minor, Eriksson Ek attended Karlstad Fria Läroverk for his high school education. Leading up to the 2015 NHL entry draft, Eriksson Ek was ranked 22nd among all international skaters by the NHL Central Scouting Bureau's mid-season ranking. In the SHL, Eriksson Ek scored four goals and two assists for six points while he scored 21 goals and 32 points through 25 games for Farjestad’s junior team. In the middle of his rookie season in the SHL, Eriksson Ek was extended on a first team contract for a further three years with Färjestad BK on 12 January 2015. Eriksson Ek earned praise by hockey pundits throughout the season, entering the draft as the fourth-highest rated international skater. Several hockey analysts theorized that Eriksson Ek would be chosen 19th overall by the Detroit Red Wings, becoming their first Swedish forward drafted in the first round. He was eventually drafted in the first round, 20th overall, by the Minnesota Wild and signed to a three-year, entry-level contract worth $2.775 million. Rather than start playing with the Wild at once, Eriksson Ek returned to Sweden for the 2015–16 season where he accumulated 15 points with Färjestad BK.

=== Minnesota Wild ===
Following his second SHL season, Eriksson Ek attended the Wild's training camp ahead of the 2016–17 season, where he was paired with Jason Pominville and Jason Zucker. He recorded one assist and 10 shots on goal through five preseason games before being re-assigned to the Wild's American Hockey League (AHL) affiliate, the Iowa Wild, to start the season. Part of the reason for his assignment was due to Wild's salary cap issues and his immigration papers needing approval. As his immigration paperwork had yet to be approved, he was not expected to make his AHL debut immediately following the assignment. He eventually made his debut with the Iowa Wild on 18 October against the Grand Rapids Griffins and scored his first goal with the team that night. He was recalled back to the NHL the following game. Eriksson Ek made his NHL debut on 22 October 2016, against the New Jersey Devils, where he became the seventh rookie in franchise history to score his first career NHL goal in his debut game. Following the game, head coach Bruce Boudreau praised him for being a responsible player. Over his first four games with the Wild, Eriksson Ek tallied four more points and became the first teenager in Wild history to record three assists in one game on 26 October. However, after his first four games, he would then go pointless in his next five. After two games as a healthy scratch, Eriksson Ek was returned to Färjestad BK on 17 November, thus preserving all three years on his rookie contract. Over 26 regular-season games with the Farjestad BK, Eriksson Ek recorded eight goals and eight assists for 16 points and added three goals and three assists for six points over seven SHL playoff games. On 28 March, Eriksson Ek returned to the Minnesota Wild for the remainder of the 2016–17 season. Eriksson Ek stepped into a primarily bottom-six role upon rejoining the team and finished the regular season with three goals and four assists for seven points over 15 games. As the Wild qualified for the 2017 Stanley Cup playoffs, Eriksson Ek made his postseason debut during their first round series against the St. Louis Blues. He made his debut in Game 1 of the series, where he registered three shots on goal in 11:04 minutes of ice time. He went pointless over three games in the Stanley Cup playoffs as the Blues eliminated the Wild in five games.

During the 2017 offseason, Eriksson Ek trained alongside fellow Swedish NHL players Jonas Brodin, Oscar Klefbom, and Marcus Johansson while also adding 10 pounds (4.5 kg) of muscle. USA Today listed Eriksson Ek as one of the top rookies to know for the 2017–18 season and a possible candidate to win the Calder Memorial Trophy as the NHL's Rookie of the Year. While participating in the NHL's Traverse City Prospects Tournament, Eriksson Ek suffered a mild injury that resulted in him missing the first few days of training camp. He recovered in time to play in the Wild's opening night game against the Detroit Red Wings, where he immediately found chemistry on the third line with Marcus Foligno and Chris Stewart. The trio scored the team's first two goals of the season 48 seconds apart in the Wild's opening night game against the Detroit Red Wings. His production slowed down over the next 10 games as he accumulated only three points while averaging nearly 14 minutes of ice time as the team's third-line centre. After failing to improve on his three points in the first 20 games of the season, Eriksson Ek was re-assigned to the Iowa Wild on 21 November. He recorded three goals and four assists for seven points over seven games with the Iowa Wild before being recalled back to the NHL on 6 December. Over the month of December, Eriksson Ek was paired on a line with Daniel Winnik but continued his scoring struggles. After only accumulating seven points over 42 games, Eriksson Ek was re-assigned to the AHL on 26 January. He added one assist over one game with the Iowa Wild before returning to the NHL level three days later. After going 50 games without a goal, Eriksson Ek broke his scoring drought in a 5–3 win over the New York Islanders on 19 February 2018. Eriksson Ek finished the 2017–18 regular season with six goals and 10 assists for 16 points over 75 games. During the Wild's first round 2018 Stanley Cup playoffs series against the Winnipeg Jets, Eriksson Ek was reunited with Foligno and Winnik on the fourth line. He tallied his first career post season point, an assist off of Matt Dumba's second period goal, in Game 3 to help the Wild win 6–2. However, this would prove to be his only point of the series as the Wild were eliminated in six games.

Prior to the start of the 2018–19 season, Eriksson Ek was expected to play on a line with Jordan Greenway and Charlie Coyle. However, an early season lower-body injury kept him out of the lineup for six games starting on 11 October. As Greenway had been reassigned to the AHL prior to Eriksson Ek's reactivation from injured reserve, his new linemate on the fourth line was Matt Read. Upon returning from his injury, Eriksson Ek struggled to produce points and only accumulated one goal and three assists over 27 games. In an effort to help Eriksson Ek regain his confidence, head coach Boudreau re-assigned him to the Iowa Wild. Over his five-game stint in the AHL, Eriksson Ek recorded four goals and two assists for six points, including two power-play goals and two game-winning goals. He was recalled back to the NHL level on 8 January 2019. Upon returning to the NHL, Eriksson Ek was partnered with forwards Kyle Rau and Landon Ferraro and earned time on the team's penalty kill as a replacement for Eric Fehr. He added one goal and four assists over the following couple of games before being returned to the AHL in order to gain playing time during the NHL's mandated mid-winter break. Upon returning to the NHL, Eriksson Ek formed an immediate connection with Luke Kunin whom he had played alongside in the AHL. Over their first four games back in the NHL, Kunin tallied four points while Eriksson Ek tallied three and the two were routinely praised by head coach Boudreau. However, their momentum stagnated after both Kunin and Eriksson Ek suffered injuries in March. Eriksson Ek missed eight games before returning to the Wild lineup as a second-line center between Kunin and Greenway. The trio of Eriksson Ek, Kunin, and Greenway were dubbed the "GEEK Squad" by the media as a result of their last name initials. He finished the regular season with a career-high seven goals and 14 points through 58 games. On 21 August, Eriksson Ek signed a two-year, $2.975 million contract extension with the Wild as a restricted free agent.

Despite the 2019–20 season being cut short due to the COVID-19 pandemic, Eriksson Ek set new career highs in goals and assists over 62 games. He tallied two goals and 10 assists for 12 points through the first 30 games of the season before suffering an upper-body injury during a game against the Philadelphia Flyers on 14 December. He missed four games to recover from the injury and scored the game-winning goal in his return on 23 December. Although Eriksson was setting personal records, the Wild struggled to win games and eventually replaced head coach Bruce Boudreau with Dean Evason on 14 February. At the time, the Wild had a 27–23–7 record and were within three points of a wild-card spot for the 2020 Stanley Cup playoffs. When the NHL paused play due to the COVID-19 pandemic, Eriksson Ek had already set new career-highs with eight goals and 21 assists for 29 points over 62 games. As the regular season was cancelled before its conclusion, the NHL implemented a Stanley Cup Qualifiers best-of-five tournament to determine which bottom four playoff teams advanced to the first round. As the Wild were a 10th-seed team, they faced the 7th-seeded Vancouver Canucks in the qualifying tournament. Eriksson Ek recorded his first career postseason goal in Game 4, although the Wild would be eliminated that game.

Following the 2019–20 season, the Wild lost veteran centermen Mikko Koivu and Eric Staal, which resulted in Eriksson Ek stepping into a larger role as the team's first-line centre. As the Wild's top centerman, Eriksson Ek started the season with three goals over five games and had goals in consecutive games for the first time in his NHL career. Over the season, Eriksson Ek often played on a line with Greenway and Foligno, which was nicknamed the GREEF line after their last names. In February, the Wild postponed six games after numerous players contracted COVID-19. Eriksson Ek was on the league's COVID-19 protocol list from 3 February to 13 February. At the end of his first season as the team's first line centre, Eriksson Ek improved his career-high goal total from eight to 19 while averaging a career-high 17 minutes per game. His efforts in the regular season continued into the Wild's first round series against the Vegas Golden Knights in the 2021 Stanley Cup playoffs. During Game 1, Eriksson Ek scored his second postseason goal, and first in overtime, to lift the Wild to a 1–0 win. Although he injured his knee in Game 6, Eriksson Ek returned to finish the game. The Wild would be eliminated the following game in a 6–2 Game 7 loss. On 2 July 2021, Eriksson Ek signed an eight-year, $42 million contract extension with the Wild.

Eriksson Ek remained the Wild's top line centre for the 2021–22 season but swapped Foligno and Greenway for Kirill Kaprizov and Mats Zuccarello. On 20 October 2021, Eriksson Ek recorded his first career NHL hat-trick in a 6–5 win over the Winnipeg Jets. His efforts helped the Wild start the season with a 5–3–0 record. Although he suffered an injury on 20 December and recovered in mid-January, Eriksson Ek only missed three games due to game cancellations related to COVID-19 outbreaks. However, his return was further delayed as he was entered into the league's COVID-19 protocol from 13 January to 19 January. Once he was able to return to the Wild, Eriksson Ek was reunited with Foligno and Greenway on the Wild's top line. The trio played an important role in the Wild's late season success as one of the NHL's top shutdown lines. On 5 May, Eriksson Ek and Tyson Jost recorded goals 97 seconds apart to mark the second-fastest goals to start a game in franchise history as they led the Wild 5–1 over the Washington Capitals. This also marked Eriksson Ek's career-best 20th and 21st goals and his 12th point over 14 games. However, he would soon experience a nine-game goalless drought that was broken with a two-goal, three-point game against the Seattle Kraken on 22 April. Eriksson Ek finished the regular season with a career-high 26 goals and 23 assists for 49 points as the Wild faced off against the St. Louis Blues in the 2022 Stanley Cup playoffs. Eriksson Ek played an integral role in the Wild's 6–2 win over the Blues in Game 2 as he scored two goals and added one assist. He finished the series with a career-high three goals and two assists over six games and was one of only two Wild players to score over one goal. His efforts were also recognized by the Professional Hockey Writers' Association as he placed seventh in Frank J. Selke Trophy voting as the NHL's best defensive forward.

Injuries to Foligno and Greenway resulted in the GREEF line being split up for the first month of the 2022–23 season. Although Eriksson Ek and Foligno started playing alongside winger Ryan Reaves in late-November, the GREEF line was shortly thereafter reunited once Greenway was healthy. Over the next eight games, Eriksson Ek accumulated four goals and seven assists for 11 points. At the end of December, the Wild had maintained a 21–13–2 record and Eriksson Ek was one of only four Wild players with over 20 points on the season. He then started the month of February with three goals and five points over a five-game point streak. After blocking a shot during a game against the Pittsburgh Penguins on 6 April, Eriksson Ek missed the final four games of the regular season and the first two games of the 2023 Stanley Cup playoffs. He returned for Game 3 against the Dallas Stars but was limited to only 19 seconds before being pulled. It was later revealed that he had suffered a fractured fibula and required surgery.

Eriksson Ek began the 2023–24 season strong by tallying eight goals and 14 points to lead the team in scoring. However, the Wild began the season with one of their worst starts in franchise history as they went 5–10–4 over their first 20 games. On 10 November, during a game against the Buffalo Sabres, Eriksson Ek became the 11th player in franchise history to score 100 goals for the team. Following the NHL All-Star Game break, Eriksson Ek was placed on the Wild's top line alongside Kaprizov and Matthew Boldy. By 15 February, Eriksson Ek had added five points over three games and the trio had combined for 17 points. On 19 February, Kaprizov and Eriksson Ek scored hat tricks in the third period to lift the Wild 10–7 over the Vancouver Canucks. As a result of their hat-tricks, they helped set a new team record for most goals in a game and matched the franchise record for points in a game.

== International play ==
Medal record

Representing Sweden

Ice hockey

World Championships
| Gold medal – first place | 2017 Germany/France | |
| Bronze medal – third place | 2024 Czechia | |

Internationally, Eriksson Ek has represented his home country of Sweden at both the junior and senior levels. He first played with the Sweden men's national under-18 ice hockey team at the 2014 World U-17 Hockey Challenge and 2014 Ivan Hlinka Memorial Tournament, although the team failed to medal both times. Eriksson Ek tallied one goal during the U-17 Hockey Challenge and four points during the Ivan Hlinka Memorial Tournament. Before being drafted into the NHL, Eriksson Ek represented Sweden again at the 2015 IIHF World U18 Championships, where he tallied five goals and six points over five games. He was also named Player of the Game on 23 April following Sweden's game against Team Canada. Eriksson Ek was named captain of Team Sweden at the 2017 World Junior Ice Hockey Championships, although they would place fourth after losing to Team Russia in the bronze medal game. He finished the tournament ranked second on the team in scoring with six goals and three assists for nine points. Later that year, he won gold for the first time at the 2017 IIHF World Championship. Over 10 games, Eriksson Ek recorded one goal and two assists for three points.

In 2025, Eriksson Ek represented Sweden at the 4 Nations Face-Off, putting up a goal and an assist in three games. In 2026, he was named to Sweden's roster for the 2026 Winter Olympics, where he would put up a goal and an assist in five games.

== Player profile ==
Described by Jeff Marek as an aggressive offensive threat, Eriksson Ek models his game after former NHL player Peter Forsberg. After being drafted by the Wild, assistant general manager Brent Flahr cited his skills as a two-way player as the main reason for drafting him. NHL Director of European Scouting Goran Stubb described Eriksson Ek as someone with "great speed, a good strong shot and excellent puck-handling".

== Career statistics ==
=== Regular season and playoffs ===
| | | | Regular season | | | | | Playoffs |
| Season | Team | League | GP | G | A | Pts | PIM | GP | G | A | Pts | PIM |
|---|---|---|---|---|---|---|---|---|---|---|---|---|
| 2012–13 | Färjestad BK | J18 | 8 | 1 | 1 | 2 | 4 | — | — | — | — | — |
| 2012–13 | Färjestad BK | J18 Allsv | 18 | 0 | 5 | 5 | 6 | — | — | — | — | — |
| 2013–14 | Färjestad BK | J18 | 19 | 16 | 9 | 25 | 8 | — | — | — | — | — |
| 2013–14 | Färjestad BK | J18 Allsv | 14 | 6 | 9 | 15 | 14 | 5 | 2 | 6 | 8 | 2 |
| 2013–14 | Färjestad BK | J20 | 13 | 2 | 2 | 4 | 4 | 4 | 1 | 1 | 2 | 2 |
| 2014–15 | Färjestad BK | J20 | 25 | 21 | 11 | 32 | 20 | 6 | 5 | 5 | 10 | 6 |
| 2014–15 | Färjestad BK | SHL | 34 | 4 | 2 | 6 | 4 | 3 | 0 | 0 | 0 | 2 |
| 2015–16 | Färjestad BK | SHL | 41 | 9 | 6 | 15 | 18 | 4 | 1 | 0 | 1 | 2 |
| 2016–17 | Iowa Wild | AHL | 1 | 1 | 0 | 1 | 0 | — | — | — | — | — |
| 2016–17 | Minnesota Wild | NHL | 15 | 3 | 4 | 7 | 4 | 3 | 0 | 0 | 0 | 0 |
| 2016–17 | Färjestad BK | SHL | 26 | 8 | 8 | 16 | 12 | 7 | 3 | 3 | 6 | 0 |
| 2017–18 | Minnesota Wild | NHL | 75 | 6 | 10 | 16 | 22 | 5 | 0 | 1 | 1 | 0 |
| 2017–18 | Iowa Wild | AHL | 8 | 3 | 5 | 8 | 8 | — | — | — | — | — |
| 2018–19 | Minnesota Wild | NHL | 58 | 7 | 7 | 14 | 20 | — | — | — | — | — |
| 2018–19 | Iowa Wild | AHL | 9 | 4 | 5 | 9 | 8 | — | — | — | — | — |
| 2019–20 | Minnesota Wild | NHL | 62 | 8 | 21 | 29 | 22 | 4 | 1 | 0 | 1 | 2 |
| 2020–21 | Minnesota Wild | NHL | 55 | 19 | 11 | 30 | 20 | 7 | 2 | 1 | 3 | 2 |
| 2021–22 | Minnesota Wild | NHL | 77 | 26 | 23 | 49 | 28 | 6 | 3 | 2 | 5 | 8 |
| 2022–23 | Minnesota Wild | NHL | 78 | 23 | 38 | 61 | 44 | 1 | 0 | 0 | 0 | 0 |
| 2023–24 | Minnesota Wild | NHL | 77 | 30 | 34 | 64 | 60 | — | — | — | — | — |
| 2024–25 | Minnesota Wild | NHL | 46 | 14 | 15 | 29 | 22 | 6 | 0 | 3 | 3 | 4 |
| 2025–26 | Minnesota Wild | NHL | 70 | 19 | 32 | 51 | 32 | 6 | 3 | 2 | 5 | 6 |
| SHL totals | | | 101 | 21 | 16 | 37 | 34 | 14 | 4 | 3 | 7 | 4 |
| NHL totals | | | 614 | 155 | 195 | 350 | 274 | 38 | 9 | 9 | 18 | 22 |

=== International ===
| Year | Team | Event | Result | GP | G | A | Pts | PIM |
|---|---|---|---|---|---|---|---|---|
| 2014 | Sweden | U17 | 6th | 5 | 1 | 0 | 1 | 0 |
| 2014 | Sweden | IH18 | 4th | 5 | 3 | 1 | 4 | 0 |
| 2015 | Sweden | WJC18 | 8th | 5 | 5 | 1 | 6 | 2 |
| 2017 | Sweden | WJC | 4th | 7 | 6 | 3 | 9 | 4 |
| 2017 | Sweden | WC | 1st place, gold medalist(s) | 10 | 1 | 2 | 3 | 4 |
| 2024 | Sweden | WC | 3rd place, bronze medalist(s) | 10 | 7 | 2 | 9 | 10 |
| 2025 | Sweden | 4NF | 3rd | 3 | 1 | 1 | 2 | 0 |
| 2026 | Sweden | OG | 7th | 5 | 1 | 1 | 2 | 4 |
| Junior totals | | | | 22 | 15 | 5 | 20 | 6 |
| Senior totals | | | | 28 | 10 | 6 | 16 | 18 |

Awards and achievements
| Preceded by Alex Tuch | Minnesota Wild first-round draft pick 2015 | Succeeded by Luke Kunin |
