= Johan Linnander =

Swedish ice hockey player

- Born: 21 February 1990 (age 35) Jönköping, Sweden
- Height: 6 ft 1 in (185 cm)
- Weight: 190 lb (86 kg; 13 st 8 lb)
- Position: Centre
- Shot: Left
- Played for: HV71; IK Oskarshamn; IF Troja-Ljungby; Borås HC; Mörrums GoIS IK
- Playing career: 2009–2013

Johan Linnander is a Swedish professional ice hockey centre who currently plays for HV71 of the Elitserien.

== Career statistics ==
			Regular season					Playoffs
Season	Team	League	GP	G	A	Pts	PIM	GP	G	A	Pts	PIM
2005–06	HV71 J18	J18 Allsvenskan	14	4	4	8	4	5	1	0	1	2
2006–07	HV71 J18	J18 Allsvenskan	10	2	7	9	6	6	0	1	1	4
2006–07	HV71 J20	J20 SuperElit	19	0	1	1	8	3	0	0	0	0
2007–08	HV71 J18	J18 Elit	3	1	3	4	0	—	—	—	—	—
2007–08	HV71 J18	J18 Allsvenskan	3	1	1	2	2	—	—	—	—	—
2007–08	HV71 J20	J20 SuperElit	41	7	7	14	10	3	0	0	0	0
2008–09	HV71 J20	J20 SuperElit	41	15	9	24	12	7	1	0	1	0
2009–10	HV71 J20	J20 SuperElit	36	23	26	49	61	3	0	1	1	2
2009–10	HV71	Elitserien	10	0	1	1	2	—	—	—	—	—
2009–10	IK Oskarshamn	HockeyAllsvenskan	6	1	3	4	2	—	—	—	—	—
2010–11	HV71 J20	J20 SuperElit	1	0	0	0	0	—	—	—	—	—
2010–11	IF Troja-Ljungby	HockeyAllsvenskan	20	2	2	4	2	—	—	—	—	—
2011–12	HV71 J20	J20 SuperElit	1	0	0	0	0	—	—	—	—	—
2011–12	HV71	Elitserien	8	0	0	0	2	—	—	—	—	—
2011–12	IF Troja-Ljungby	HockeyAllsvenskan	41	4	8	12	0	—	—	—	—	—
2012–13	Borås HC	Division 1	20	4	8	12	0	—	—	—	—	—
2012–13	Mörrums GoIS IK	Division 1	22	8	3	11	4	—	—	—	—	—
Elitserien totals			18	0	1	1	4	—	—	—	—	—
HockeyAllsvenskan totals			67	7	13	20	4	—	—	—	—	—
Division 1 totals			42	12	11	23	4	—	—	—	—	—
