= Camilo Miettinen =

Colombian-born Finnish ice hockey player

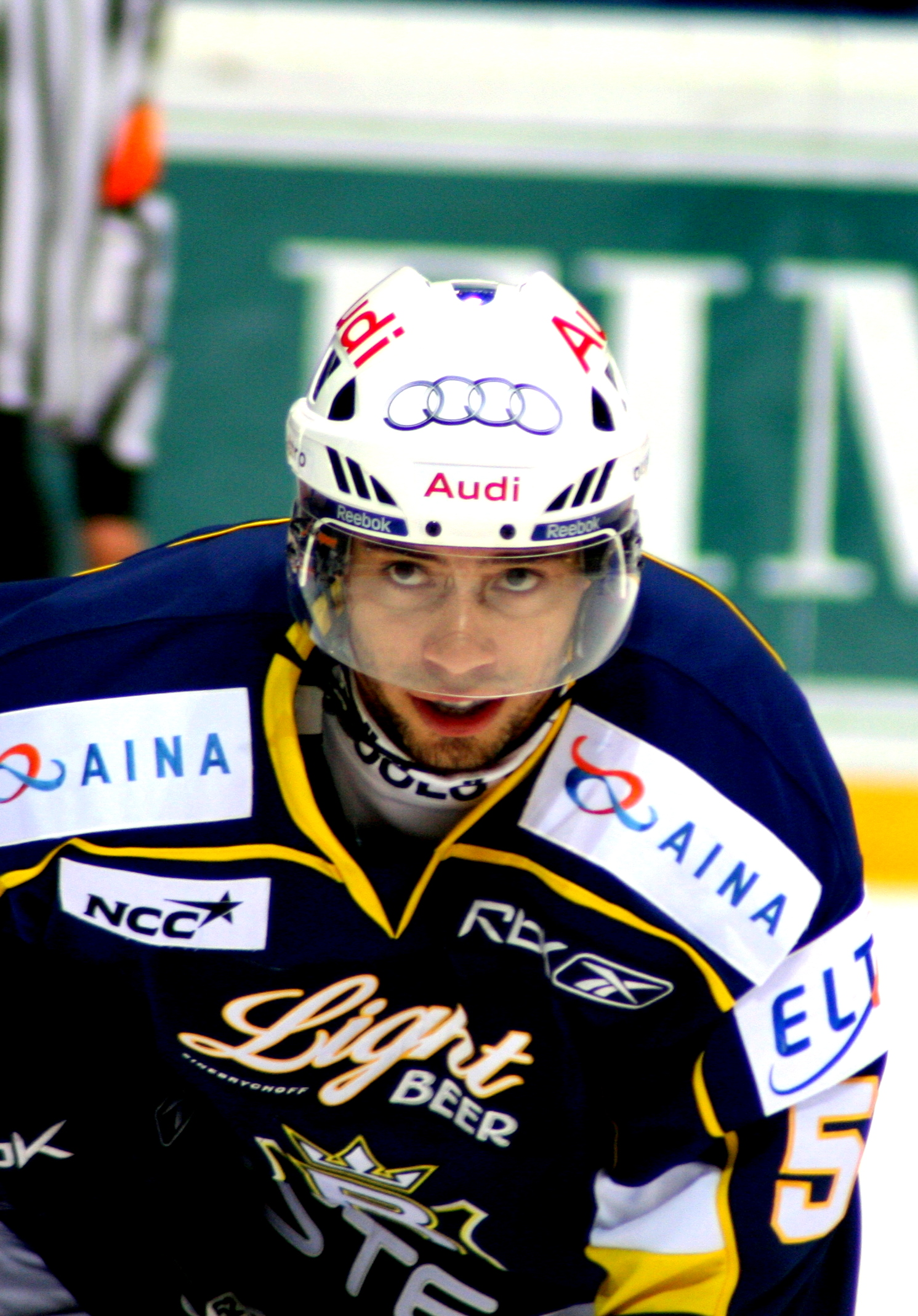
- Born: March 1, 1986 (age 40) Medellín, Colombia
- Height: 5 ft 10 in (178 cm)
- Weight: 179 lb (81 kg; 12 st 11 lb)
- Position: Forward
- Shoots: Left
- Swe-2 team Former teams: IK Oskarshamn; Espoo Blues; HC TPS
- Playing career: 2006–present

Camilo Miettinen (born March 1, 1986) is a Colombian-born Finnish professional ice hockey forward. He is currently played for HC TPS of the Finnish Liiga.

Miettinen made his SM-liiga debut playing with Espoo Blues during the 2006–07 season. In 2014 he signed a one-year contract with Swedish team IK Oskarshamn playing in HockeyAllsvenskan.

== Early life ==
Miettinen was adopted from Colombia to Finland when he was two years old.
