= Dennis Hildeby =

Swedish ice hockey player (born 2001)

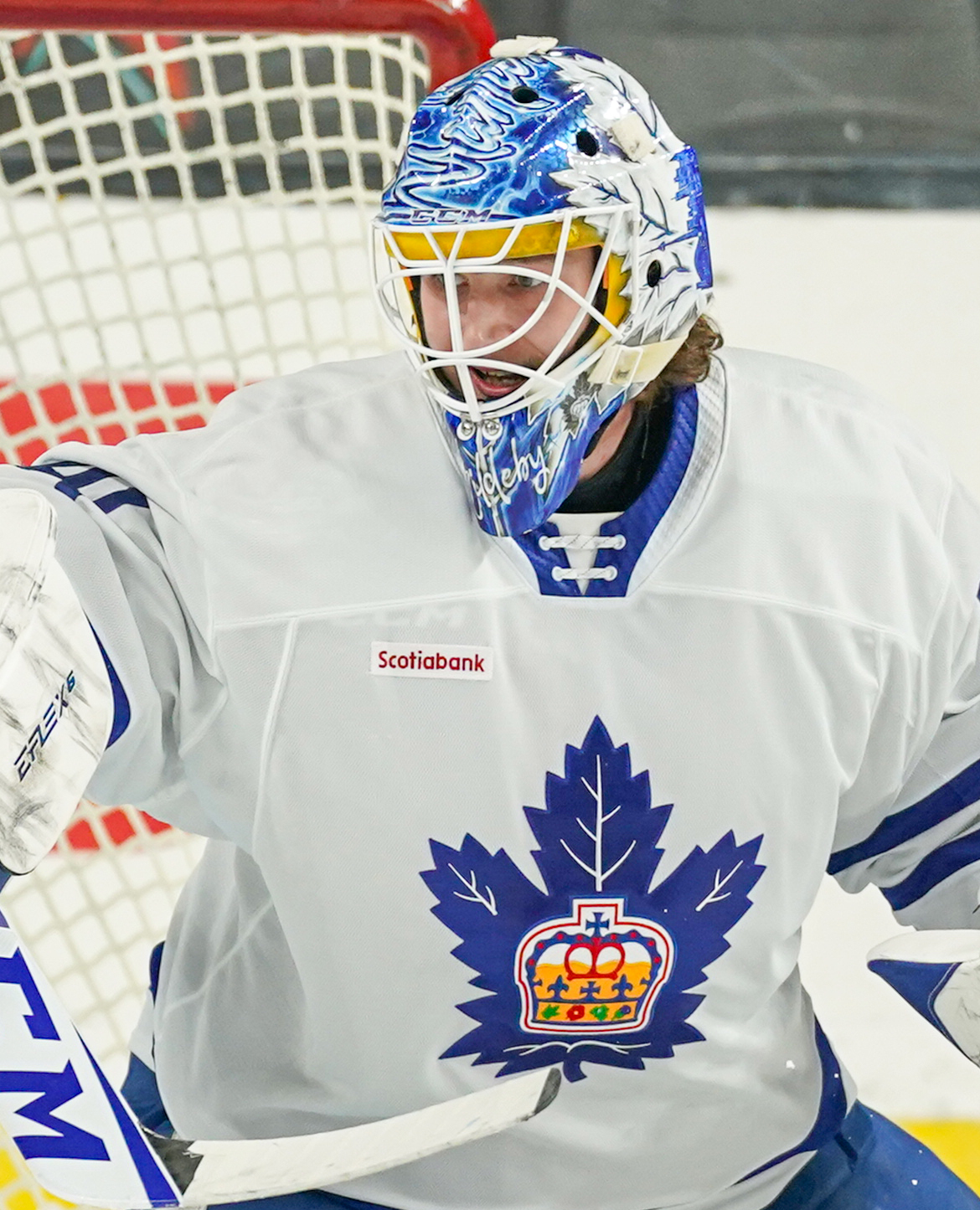
- Hildeby with the Toronto Marlies in 2024
- Born: 19 August 2001 (age 25) Järfälla, Sweden
- Height: 6 ft 7 in (201 cm)
- Weight: 231 lb (105 kg; 16 st 7 lb)
- Position: Goaltender
- Catches: Left
- NHL team Former teams: Tampa Bay Lightning; Färjestad BK; Toronto Maple Leafs
- NHL draft: 122nd overall, 2022; Toronto Maple Leafs
- Playing career: 2020–present

Dennis Hildeby (born 19 August 2001) is a Swedish professional ice hockey player who is a goaltender for the Tampa Bay Lightning of the National Hockey League (NHL). Hildeby was drafted in the fourth round, 122nd overall by the Toronto Maple Leafs in the 2022 NHL entry draft.

== Playing career ==
Hildeby was born in Järfälla, Sweden, on 19 August 2001.

Hildeby started in his youth in Timrå IK system. He played in the 2020–21 season on a loan for Linden Hockey in the Hockeyettan.

Hildeby played in seven regular season games with Färjestad BK in the Swedish Hockey League (SHL) during the 2021–22 season and won the SHL title with the team. He was drafted in the fourth round, 122nd overall by the Toronto Maple Leafs of the NHL in the 2022 NHL entry draft. On 13 July 2022, he signed a three-year, entry-level contract with the Maple Leafs. He ultimately returned to Färjestad BK on a loan to earn more experience. Hildeby finished the season with Färjestad BK and came over to North America, where he appeared in two games with the Maple Leafs' American Hockey League (AHL) affiliate, the Toronto Marlies. During the 2023 Stanley Cup playoffs, Hildeby was recalled on an emergency basis by the Maple Leafs after starting goaltender Ilya Samsonov was injured.

Hildeby attended the Maple Leafs' 2023 training camp, but was assigned to the Marlies to start the 2023–24 season. He was later called up to the Maple Leafs as Samsonov's replacement after the goaltender was placed on waivers, though he did not see any ice time. He was again assigned to the Marlies to start the 2024–25 season, though following an injury to Joseph Woll, he was recalled to the Maple Leafs on an emergency basis. On 10 October 2024, Hildeby made his NHL debut with the Maple Leafs, making 23 saves in a 4–2 victory over the New Jersey Devils. He played in one more game, suffering his first NHL loss to the Columbus Blue Jackets, before Woll was activated and he was returned to the Marlies on 24 October.

Hildeby earned his first NHL shutout in a 2–0 Maple Leafs' win over the Tampa Bay Lightning on 8 December 2025.

On 1 July 2026, Hildeby, along with a 2027 fourth round pick and a 2028 third round pick, were traded to the Tampa Bay Lightning in exchange for Nick Paul.

== Career statistics ==
			Regular season									Playoffs
Season	Team	League	GP	W	L	OT	MIN	GA	SO	GAA	SV%	GP	W	L	MIN	GA	SO	GAA	SV%
2017–18	Timrå IK	J18	12	6	5	0	—	—	2	1.99	.929	—	—	—	—	—	—	—	—
2018–19	Timrå IK	J18	2	1	1	0	120	7	1	3.50	.881	—	—	—	—	—	—	—	—
2018–19	Timrå IK	J20	23	7	14	0	1,288	79	0	3.68	.873	—	—	—	—	—	—	—	—
2019–20	Timrå IK	J20	27	16	10	0	1,613	74	2	2.75	.911	—	—	—	—	—	—	—	—
2020–21	Färjestad BK	J20	18	7	11	0	1,086	56	0	3.10	.911	—	—	—	—	—	—	—	—
2020–21	Linden Hockey	Div.1	2	0	2	0	74	4	0	3.26	.913	—	—	—	—	—	—	—	—
2021–22	Färjestad BK	J20	12	6	5	0	707	33	0	2.80	.931	—	—	—	—	—	—	—	—
2021–22	Färjestad BK	SHL	7	3	2	0	342	11	1	1.93	.931	—	—	—	—	—	—	—	—
2022–23	Färjestad BK	SHL	21	11	9	0	1,222	46	3	2.26	.918	1	0	0	12	0	0	0.00	1.000
2022–23	Toronto Marlies	AHL	2	0	1	0	91	8	0	5.28	.849	1	0	0	11	0	0	0.00	1.000
2023–24	Toronto Marlies	AHL	41	21	11	7	2,394	96	4	2.41	.913	3	1	2	179	10	0	3.35	.896
2024–25	Toronto Marlies	AHL	30	16	9	4	1,692	72	2	2.55	.908	1	0	1	69	4	0	3.50	.886
2024–25	Toronto Maple Leafs	NHL	6	3	3	0	361	20	0	3.33	.878	—	—	—	—	—	—	—	—
2025–26	Toronto Maple Leafs	NHL	20	5	7	4	1,008	48	1	2.86	.914	—	—	—	—	—	—	—	—
2025–26	Toronto Marlies	AHL	23	10	8	5	1,393	63	0	2.71	.898	3	1	1	138	5	0	2.17	.921
SHL totals			28	14	11	0	1,564	57	4	2.19	.921	1	0	0	12	0	0	0.00	1.000
NHL totals			26	8	10	4	1,370	68	1	2.98	.906	—	—	—	—	—	—	—	—

== Awards and honours ==
Award	Year	Ref
SHL
Le Mat Trophy champion	2022	
AHL
Calder Cup champion	2026	
