= Mathias Johansson (ice hockey) =

Swedish ice hockey player

- Born: 22 February 1974 (age 51) Oskarshamn, Sweden
- Height: 6 ft 2 in (188 cm)
- Weight: 185 lb (84 kg; 13 st 3 lb)
- Position: Centre
- Shot: Left
- Played for: Farjestads BK; Calgary Flames; Pittsburgh Penguins; Ritten Renon
- National team: Sweden
- NHL draft: 54th overall, 1992; Calgary Flames
- Playing career: 1990–2010

Mathias Evert Johansson (born 22 February 1974) is a Swedish former professional ice hockey forward. He played 58 games in the National Hockey League with the Calgary Flames and Pittsburgh Penguins during the 2002–03 season. The rest of his career, which lasted from 1990 to 2010, was mainly spent in the Swedish Hockey League. Internationally Johansson played for the Swedish national team at four World Championships and the 2002 Winter Olympics.

== Career ==
Johansson represented Sweden in the 2002 Winter Olympics in Salt Lake City, United States. He has also represented Sweden in the Ice Hockey World Championship three times (2001, 2002 and 2003). He has played one season (2002–03) in the NHL, during which he played 46 games with the Calgary Flames and 12 games the Pittsburgh Penguins. During the rest of his career he has played with the Swedish team Färjestads BK but in April 2008 he was forced to leave the club, after a bad season, Färjestad did not offer him a new contract. In May 2008 he signed a three-year contract with Allsvenskan side Malmö Redhawks.

== Career statistics ==
=== Regular season and playoffs ===
			Regular season					Playoffs
Season	Team	League	GP	G	A	Pts	PIM	GP	G	A	Pts	PIM
1990–91	Farjestads BK Karlstad	SEL	3	0	0	0	0	—	—	—	—	—
1991–92	Färjestad BK	SEL	16	0	0	0	2	—	—	—	—	—
1992–93	Färjestad BK	SEL	11	2	1	3	4	—	—	—	—	—
1993–94	Färjestad BK	SEL	16	2	1	3	4	—	—	—	—	—
1994–95	Färjestad BK	SEL	40	7	8	15	30	4	4	3	7	2
1995–96	Färjestad BK	SEL	40	8	21	29	8	8	2	1	3	4
1996–97	Färjestad BK	SEL	48	12	15	27	14	14	4	4	8	12
1997–98	Färjestad BK	SEL	46	8	21	29	36	—	—	—	—	—
1998–99	Färjestad BK	SEL	50	9	15	24	14	3	0	1	1	4
1999–00	Färjestad BK	SEL	49	20	19	39	40	—	—	—	—	—
2000–01	Färjestad BK	SEL	49	15	20	35	42	16	4	9	13	18
2001–02	Färjestad BK	SEL	50	4	11	15	22	10	6	1	7	8
2002–03	Calgary Flames	NHL	46	4	5	9	12	—	—	—	—	—
2002–03	Pittsburgh Penguins	NHL	12	1	5	6	4	—	—	—	—	—
2003–04	Färjestad BK	SEL	50	6	14	20	24	17	2	4	6	12
2004–05	Färjestad BK	SEL	47	9	11	20	40	15	3	4	7	31
2005–06	Färjestad BK	SEL	47	16	16	32	30	14	5	9	14	10
2006–07	Färjestad BK	SEL	54	5	17	22	60	9	2	3	5	2
2007–08	Färjestad BK	SEL	46	6	4	10	54	12	1	0	1	12
2008–09	Leksands IF	SWE-2	6	2	0	2	4	—	—	—	—	—
2008–09	Malmo Redhawks	SWE-2	36	6	18	24	32	—	—	—	—	—
2009–10	Ritten Renon	ITA	27	12	11	23	18	—	—	—	—	—
SEL totals			663	131	197	328	426	144	37	41	78	125
NHL totals			58	5	10	15	16	—	—	—	—	—

== International play ==
Medal record

Representing Sweden

World Championships
Gold medal – first place	2006 Latvia	
Silver medal – second place	2003 Finland	
Bronze medal – third place	2001 Germany	
Bronze medal – third place	2002 Sweden	

World Junior Championships
Silver medal – second place	1994 Czech Republic	

European Junior Championships
Silver medal – second place	1992 Norway	

=== International ===
Year	Team	Event	GP	G	A	Pts	PIM
1991	Sweden	EJC	6	2	0	2	0
1992	Sweden	EJC	6	3	2	5	10
1994	Sweden	WJC	7	2	2	4	0
2001	Sweden	WC	9	1	1	2	14
2002	Sweden	OLY	4	1	0	1	0
2002	Sweden	WC	9	0	3	3	4
2003	Sweden	WC	8	0	0	0	0
2006	Sweden	WC	4	0	0	0	4
Junior totals			19	7	4	11	10
Senior totals			34	2	4	6	22

== Awards and titles ==
- 1997, 1998, 2002 and 2006: winner of the Elitserien with Färjestads BK
- 2010: winner of the Italian Cup of ice hockey with Renon
