= Peter Nordström =

Swedish ice hockey player

- Born: July 26, 1974 (age 52) Munkfors, Sweden
- Height: 6 ft 2 in (188 cm)
- Weight: 194 lb (88 kg; 13 st 12 lb)
- Position: Left wing
- Shot: Left
- Played for: Leksands IF; Färjestads BK; Boston Bruins
- National team: Sweden
- NHL draft: 78th overall, 1998; Boston Bruins
- Playing career: 1994–2011

Hans Peter Nordström (born July 26, 1974, in Munkfors, Sweden) is a Swedish former professional ice hockey player. He played his last seasons for Leksands IF. He also played two games for the Boston Bruins of the National Hockey League during the 1998–99 season. Internationally Nordström played for the Swedish national team at five World Championships

== Playing career ==
Nordström started his professional ice hockey career in the Swedish elite club Leksands IF in 1994. But after only one year he left Leksand IF and signed with its rivals Färjestads BK. Nordström played with Färjestad until 1998, winning the Swedish Championship in both 1997 and 1998. Then he was drafted by the Boston Bruins in the 1998 NHL entry draft (3rd round, 78th pick overall).

In 1998 he signed with the Bruins. But after the training camp he became assigned to the AHL club Providence Bruins. After only playing 13 games with Providence and two games with Boston Nordström went back home to Sweden and Färjestad and playing the rest of the 1998–99 season there.

In 2002, he won his third Swedish championship with Färjestad. In 2006, he won his fourth championship, also with Färjestad.

== Retirement ==
On May 26, 2011, Nordström announced his retirement from hockey due to injuries and said he intends to become a coach.

== Career statistics ==
=== Regular season and playoffs ===
			Regular season					Playoffs
Season	Team	League	GP	G	A	Pts	PIM	GP	G	A	Pts	PIM
1989–90	IFK Munkfors	SWE-3	21	2	1	3	8	—	—	—	—	—
1990–91	IFK Munkfors	SWE-3	32	12	16	28	20	—	—	—	—	—
1991–92	IFK Munkfors	SWE-3	31	12	20	32	42	—	—	—	—	—
1992–93	IFK Munkfors	SWE-3	35	19	11	30	44	—	—	—	—	—
1993–94	IFK Munkfors	SWE-3	31	17	26	43	87	—	—	—	—	—
1994–95	Leksands IF U20	J20	4	0	0	0	2	—	—	—	—	—
1994–95	IFK Munkfors	SWE-2	21	8	17	25	30	—	—	—	—	—
1994–95	Leksands IF	SWE	13	1	0	1	0	—	—	—	—	—
1995–96	Färjestads BK	SWE	40	5	6	11	36	8	0	3	3	12
1996–97	Färjestads BK	SWE	44	9	5	14	32	14	1	2	3	6
1997–98	Färjestads BK	SWE	45	6	19	25	46	12	5	7	12	8
1998–99	Providence Bruins	AHL	13	2	1	3	2	—	—	—	—	—
1998–99	Boston Bruins	NHL	2	0	0	0	0	—	—	—	—	—
1998–99	Färjestads BK	SWE	21	4	4	8	14	4	1	1	2	2
1999–00	Färjestads BK	SWE	45	8	14	22	48	7	0	3	3	2
2000–01	Färjestads BK	SWE	49	7	15	22	59	16	2	6	8	30
2001–02	Färjestads BK	SWE	45	5	18	23	56	9	3	3	6	4
2002–03	Färjestads BK	SWE	44	13	17	30	59	14	5	5	10	10
2003–04	Färjestads BK	SWE	42	11	22	33	30	15	6	7	13	6
2004–05	Färjestads BK	SWE	48	11	21	32	56	13	1	3	4	66
2005–06	Färjestads BK	SWE	18	6	5	11	16	17	6	8	14	39
2006–07	Färjestads BK	SWE	51	26	29	55	58	9	2	4	6	8
2007–08	Färjestads BK	SWE	17	2	4	6	4	—	—	—	—	—
2008–09	Färjestads BK	SWE	27	6	7	13	14	13	5	6	11	10
2009–10	Leksands IF	SWE-2	44	15	22	37	24	—	—	—	—	—
SWE totals			549	121	185	306	528	131	37	58	95	203
NHL totals			2	0	0	0	0	—	—	—	—	—

=== International ===
Year	Team	Event	GP	G	A	Pts	PIM
1998	Sweden	WC	10	0	2	2	4
1999	Sweden	WC	10	0	1	1	2
2000	Sweden	WC	7	2	1	3	4
2003	Sweden	WC	9	2	6	8	4
2005	Sweden	WC	8	1	4	5	2
Senior totals			44	5	14	19	16

== International play ==
Peter Nordström
Medal record

Men's ice hockey

World Championships
Silver medal – second place	2003	Sweden
Bronze medal – third place	1999	Sweden
Gold medal – first place	1998	Sweden

Nordström represented Sweden at five World Championships: 1998 (gold), 1999 (bronze), 2000 (7th place), 2003 (silver) and 2005 (4 place).
