= David Kudělka =

Czech ice hockey player

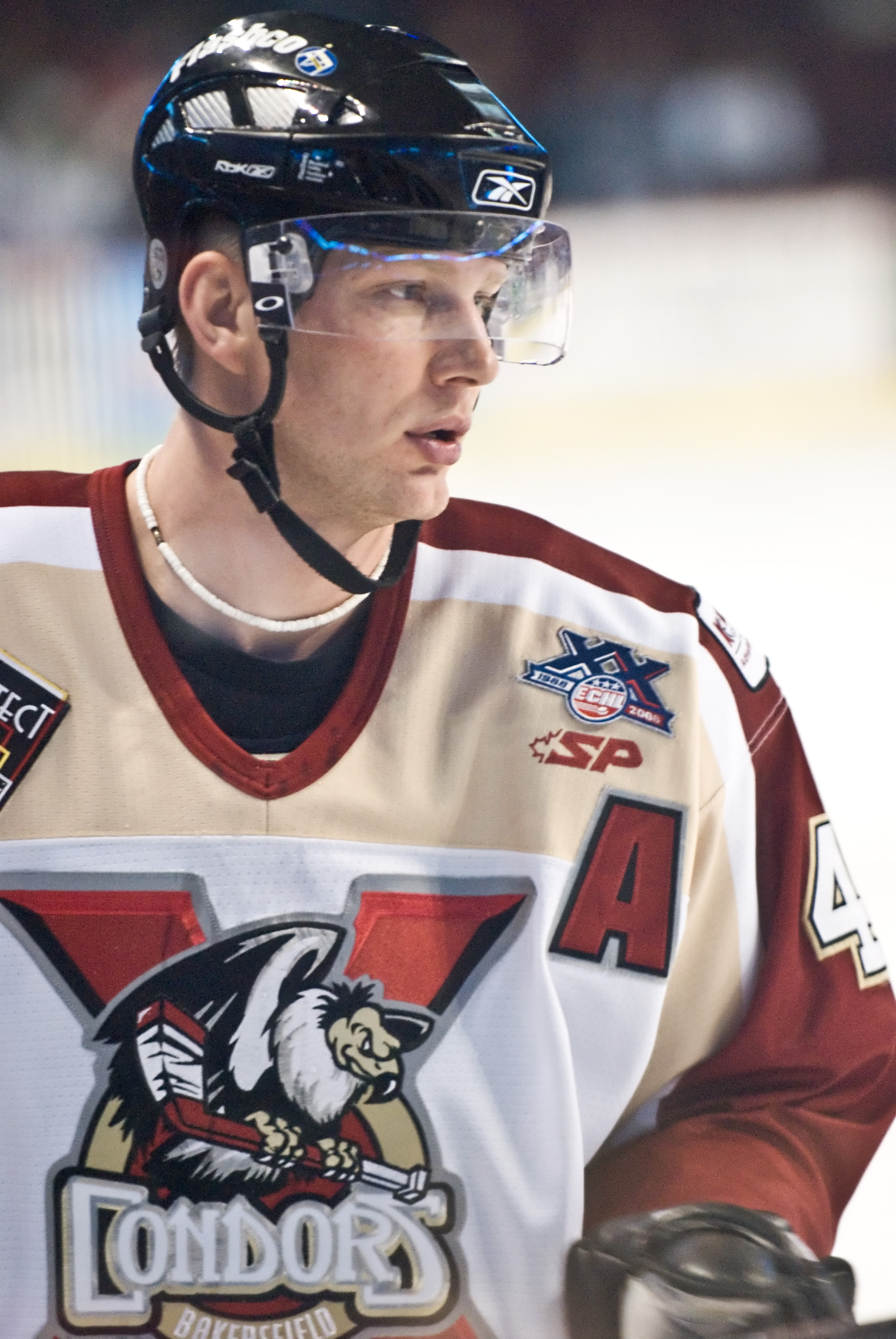
- Born: 8 March 1975 (age 51) Přerov, Czechoslovakia
- Height: 6 ft 4 in (193 cm)
- Position: Defence
- Shot: Left
- Played for: HC Slovan Bratislava,
- NHL draft: Undrafted
- Playing career: 1998–2015

David Kudelka (born 8 March 1975) is a Czech former professional ice hockey player who played with HC Slovan Bratislava in the Slovak Extraliga. He is married and has one daughter. He's now an active coach in Czechia.
