= Olle Eriksson Ek =

Swedish ice hockey player (born 1999)

- Born: 22 June 1999 (age 27) Karlstad, Sweden
- Height: 6 ft 3 in (191 cm)
- Weight: 189 lb (86 kg; 13 st 7 lb)
- Position: Goaltender
- Catches: Left
- Allsv team Former teams: IF Björklöven; Anaheim Ducks; MoDo Hockey
- NHL draft: 153rd overall, 2017; Anaheim Ducks
- Playing career: 2018–present

Olle Eriksson Ek (born 22 June 1999) is a Swedish professional ice hockey goaltender for IF Björklöven of the HockeyAllsvenskan (Allsv). He was drafted 153rd overall by the Anaheim Ducks in the 2017 NHL entry draft.

== Playing career ==
On 22 July 2022, the Anaheim Ducks signed Eriksson Ek to a one-year contract extension through the 2022–23 NHL season. He made his NHL debut for the Ducks on 8 April 2023, in a game against the Arizona Coyotes, helping Anaheim earn a point in an overtime loss after stopping 33 shots. On 10 April 2023, he was reassigned to the Ducks' American Hockey League (AHL) affiliate, the San Diego Gulls. He appeared in 61 career AHL games with San Diego, posting a 17–35–3 record with one shutout, a 3.79 goals-against average (GAA) and .876 save percentage.

On 8 May 2023, Eriksson Ek opted to return to Sweden, signing a two-year contract with the newly promoted MoDo Hockey of the SHL. His rights were later relinquished by the Ducks after he was not tendered a qualifying offer on 30 June 2023.

Unable to help MoDo maintain their SHL status at the conclusion of the 2024–25 season, Eriksson Ek left the club having completed his contract to sign a one-year deal with IF Björklöven of the HockeyAllsvenskan on 29 July 2025.

== Personal life ==
Eriksson Ek is the son of former hockey player Clas Eriksson and the younger brother of Joel Eriksson Ek, a centre for the Minnesota Wild.
