= Jonas Karlsson (journalist) =

Sports Journalist

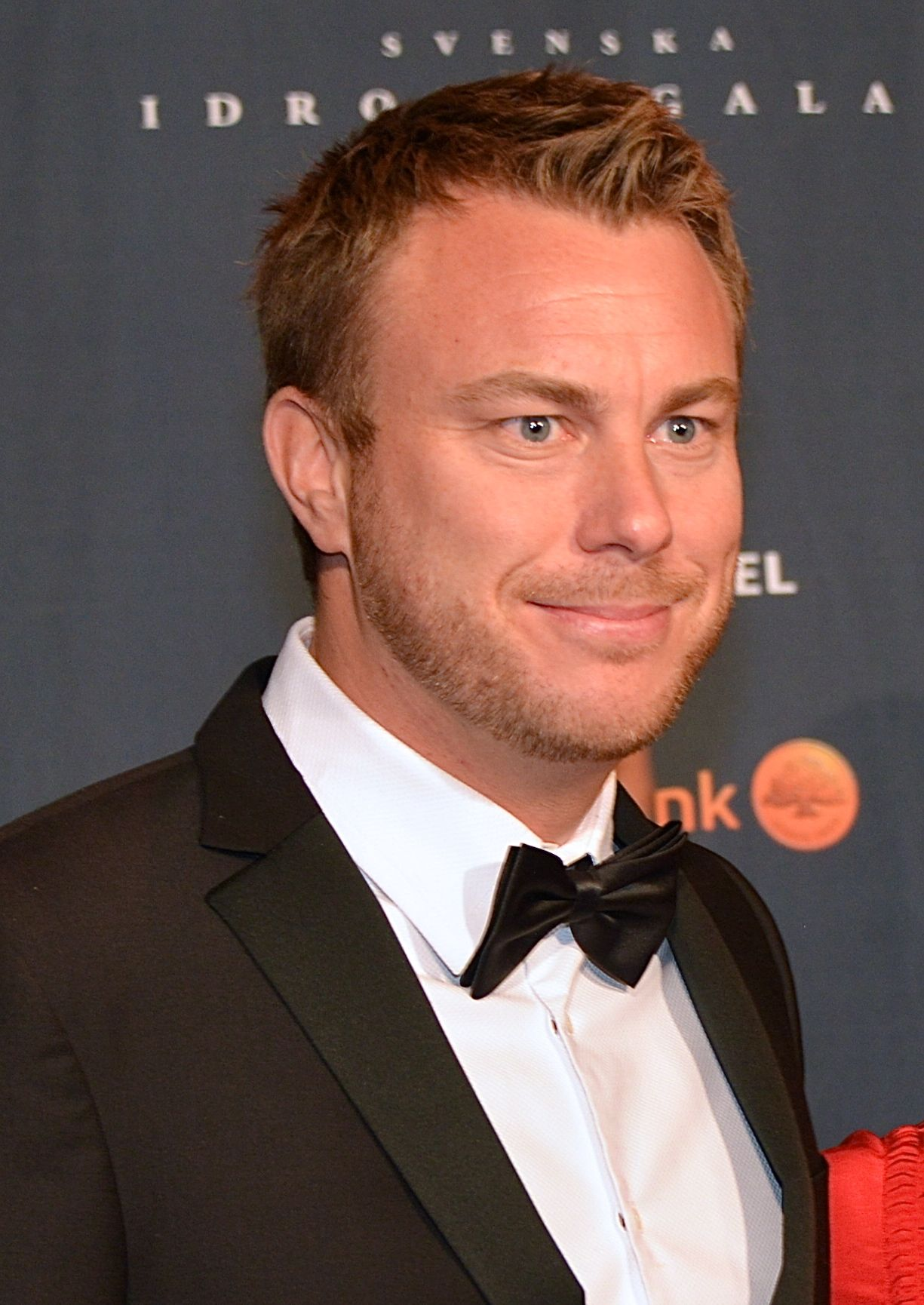
- Jonas Karlsson during the Swedish Sports Awards in the Stockholm Globe Arena in January 2013
- Born: 2 July 1977 (age 48); Karlstad, Sweden
- Occupation: journalist

Ulf Jonas Ulrik Karlsson better known as Jonas Karlsson (born in Karlstad, Sweden on 2 July 1977) is a Swedish sports journalist, TV host and commentator on Sveriges Television and a well known sports columnist and project manager.

Jonas Karlsson was a former athlete and as a junior competed in hammer throwing athletic events and won the Swedish youth national championships.

He started his journalistic career commenting mainly on cross-country skiing and track and field events. In January 2006, he succeeded Albert Svanberg as sports columnist with Sveriges Television (SVT). In 2013, he became a project manager for sports programming with the station. In 2016 he was recruited by Discovery Networks and Eurosport as the host for the channels broadcast from the Olympic Games in PyeongChang and Tokyo.

== Personal life ==
He is the son athletics coach Ulf Karlsson and younger brother of Mikael Karlsson, the chairman of Swedish Society for Nature Conservation, the nature protection agency in Sweden.
