= Nichlas Torp =

Swedish ice hockey player

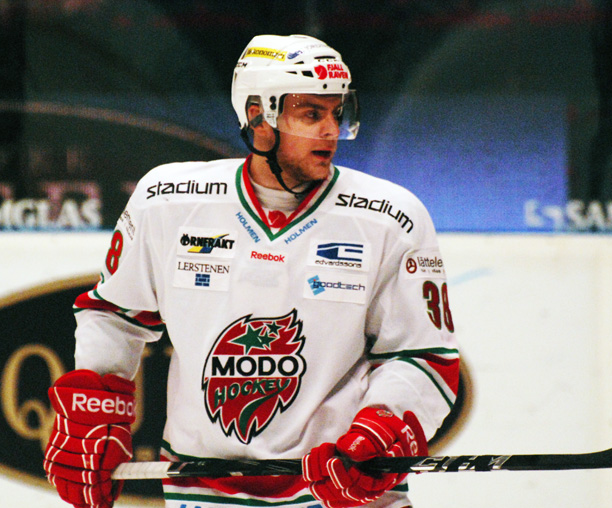
- Born: April 10, 1989 (age 37) Jönköping, Sweden
- Height: 5 ft 11 in (180 cm)
- Weight: 203 lb (92 kg; 14 st 7 lb)
- Position: Defence
- Shot: Left
- Played for: Timrå IK; Modo Hockey; Leksands IF; Thomas Sabo Ice Tigers; Malmö Redhawks; Düsseldorfer EG; IK Oskarshamn; HV71; Nybro Vikings
- NHL draft: 163rd overall, 2007; Montreal Canadiens
- Playing career: 2008–2025

Nichlas Torp (born April 10, 1989 in Jönköping) is a Swedish professional ice hockey player for the Nybro Vikings in the HockeyAllsvenskan. He was selected in the sixth round, 163rd overall, by the Montreal Canadiens in the 2007 NHL entry draft.

== Playing career ==
Torp made his debut in the Swedish Hockey League (SHL) representing his hometown team HV71 during the 2008-09 season. In 2010, he helped the team win the Swedish national championship. He moved to Timrå IK in 2011, where he spent one year, followed by a four-year tenure at Modo Hockey.

The 2016-17 season saw him skate for Leksands IF, before taking his game abroad for the first time in his career, when putting pen to paper on a deal with the Nürnberg Ice Tigers of the German DEL on February 6, 2017.

== Career statistics ==
=== Regular season and playoffs ===
			Regular season					Playoffs
Season	Team	League	GP	G	A	Pts	PIM	GP	G	A	Pts	PIM
2004–05	HV71	J18 Allsv	11	5	2	7	20	—	—	—	—	—
2005–06	HV71	J18 Allsv	8	3	1	4	45	5	1	1	2	12
2005–06	HV71	J20	7	0	0	0	34	—	—	—	—	—
2006–07	HV71	J18 Allsv	1	0	0	0	2	3	1	0	1	43
2006–07	HV71	J20	17	3	1	4	42	4	0	2	2	10
2008–09	HV71	J20	4	0	1	1	22	—	—	—	—	—
2008–09	HV71	SEL	44	0	2	2	43	12	0	0	0	0
2009–10	HV71	SEL	47	1	5	6	93	16	0	1	1	10
2010–11	HV71	SEL	47	0	4	4	30	4	0	0	0	0
2011–12	Timrå IK	SEL	47	2	4	6	89	—	—	—	—	—
2012–13	MODO Hockey	SEL	46	0	1	1	34	5	0	0	0	0
2013–14	MODO Hockey	SHL	49	1	7	8	79	2	0	1	1	2
2014–15	MODO Hockey	SHL	44	3	6	9	74	—	—	—	—	—
2015–16	MODO Hockey	SHL	33	0	4	4	28	—	—	—	—	—
2016–17	Leksands IF	SHL	28	0	0	0	41	—	—	—	—	—
2016–17	Nürnberg Ice Tigers	DEL	7	0	0	0	29	12	1	0	1	18
2017–18	Nürnberg Ice Tigers	DEL	38	2	2	4	10	5	1	0	1	0
2018–19	Malmö Redhawks	SHL	22	0	1	1	12	—	—	—	—	—
2018–19	Düsseldorfer EG	DEL	9	0	1	1	10	6	0	0	0	2
2019–20	HC Dalen	SWE.3	2	0	0	0	4	—	—	—	—	—
2019–20	IK Oskarshamn	SHL	39	1	4	5	34	—	—	—	—	—
2020–21	IK Oskarshamn	SHL	43	2	3	5	40	—	—	—	—	—
2021–22	HV71	Allsv	51	0	13	13	36	11	0	3	3	11
2022–23	HV71	SHL	39	2	3	5	8	—	—	—	—	—
2023–24	Nybro Vikings IF	Allsv	33	2	6	8	18	6	2	2	4	4
2024–25	Nybro Vikings IF	Allsv	42	2	6	8	76	2	0	0	0	2
SHL totals			528	12	44	56	605	39	0	2	2	12
DEL totals			54	2	3	5	49	23	2	0	2	20
Allsv totals			126	4	25	29	130	19	2	5	7	17

=== International ===
Year	Team	Event	GP	G	A	Pts	PIM
2007	Sweden	WJC18	6	0	1	1	6
2009	Sweden	WJC	6	0	1	1	2
Junior totals			12	0	2	2	8
