= Zdeněk Kubica =

Czech ice hockey player (born 1986)

- Born: August 8, 1986 (age 39) Blansko, Czechoslovakia
- Height: 6 ft 2 in (188 cm)
- Weight: 194 lb (88 kg; 13 st 12 lb)
- Position: Left wing
- Shoots: Left
- team Former teams: Free agent HC Plzeň; HC Slavia Praha; Rytíři Kladno; BK Mladá Boleslav
- Playing career: 2003–present

Zdeněk Kubica (born August 8, 1986) is a Czech professional ice hockey left winger. He is currently a free agent having last played for HC Slavia Praha of the Change Liga.

Kubica has previously played in the Czech Extraliga for HC Plzeň, Slavia Praha, Rytíři Kladno and BK Mladá Boleslav, playing 95 games in total. He had numerous loans spells with Slavia from 2015 until he joined the team permanently on November 15, 2019.
