= Jonas Karlsson (ice hockey) =

Swedish ice hockey player

- Born: February 14, 1986 (age 39); Kil, Sweden
- Height: 5 ft 11 in (180 cm)
- Weight: 181 lb (82 kg; 12 st 13 lb)
- Position: Forward
- Shoots: Left
- Hockeyettan team Former teams: Lindlövens IF; Örebro HK; BIK Karlskoga; Sparta Warriors
- NHL draft: Undrafted
- Playing career: 2003–present

Jonas Karlsson (born February 14, 1986) is a Swedish ice hockey player. He is currently playing with Lindlövens IF of the Hockeyettan.

Karlsson has earlier played in the Swedish Hockey League with Örebro HK, during the 2013–14 SHL season.
