= Martin Koudelka =

Czech ice hockey player

- Born: February 11, 1976 (age 50)
- Height: 6 ft 0 in (183 cm)
- Weight: 205 lb (93 kg; 14 st 9 lb)
- Position: Forward
- Shoots: Left
- Czech Extraliga team: HC Litomyšl
- Playing career: 1994–present

Martin Koudelka (born February 11, 1976) is a Czech professional ice hockey player. He played with HC Oceláři Třinec in the Czech Extraliga during the 2010–11 Czech Extraliga season.
