= Färjestad BK =

Ice hockey team in Sweden

FBK
- City: Karlstad, Sweden
- League: Swedish Hockey League
- Founded: 10 November 1932; 93 years ago
- Home arena: Löfbergs Arena (capacity: 8,645)
- Colors
- General manager: Rickard Wallin
- Head coach: Cam Abbot
- Captain: Linus Johansson
- Website: farjestadbk.se

Championships
- Regular season titles: 11 (1982, 1983, 1986, 1987, 1990, 1992, 2002, 2007, 2009, 2019, 2024)
- Le Mat Trophy: 10 (1981, 1986, 1988, 1997, 1998, 2002, 2006, 2009, 2011, 2022)

Färjestad Bollklubb (Swedish pronunciation: [ˈfæ̌rjɛsta]; abbreviated as FBK) is a Swedish professional ice hockey team based in Karlstad.

Färjestad has had 21 Swedish Championship final appearances, winning ten times since the Swedish Hockey League (SHL; formerly Elitserien) was started in 1975, making them the most successful SHL club in history. The team plays in the highest Swedish league and have done so since 1965. Following Brynäs IF's relegation to HockeyAllsvenskan in 2023, Färjestad is the only team to have constantly played in the current top tier of Swedish hockey, the SHL, since it was started in 1975. They reached the SHL championship finals for six consecutive seasons (2001–2006), winning the championship two times. They are featured rivals with Djurgårdens IF, Frölunda HC, and HV71.

== History ==
Färjestad BK was founded on 10 November 1932 at Håfström Kiosk in the district of Färjestad in Karlstad by Sven Bryhske, Gösta Jonsson, Sven Larsson and Erik Myren. Initially the association's main sport was bandy, which is still reflected in the full name of the club. Ice hockey was first included in 1956.

In 1965, Färjestad were promoted to the top division (at that time Division 1 Southern) which they succeeded in winning for the first time in 1973. During the 1974/75 season, Färjestad qualified for the first season of Elitserien, and have since never been relegated.

In 2014, Färjestad BK played in the 2014 AHL All Star Game in St. John's, Newfoundland against a team of AHL All Stars. In the skills contest, Färjestad lost 18-17 against the All Stars on a Tuesday evening at Mile One Center. In the AHL All-Star Game, Färjestad lost again to the AHL All Stars 7-2 with a sold out crowd the following evening.

== Season-by-season results ==
This is a partial list featuring the past five seasons. For prior seasons, see List of Färjestad BK seasons.

Season	Level	Division	Record		Avg. home atnd.	Notes
Season	Level	Division	Position	W-OTW-OTL-L	Avg. home atnd.	Notes
2020–21	Tier 1	SHL	8th	18–11–5–18	21	Top scorer: (Sweden) D. Viksten (48 pts); Top goalie: (Sweden) A. Holm (91.40 SV%)
2020–21	Swedish Championship playoffs		—	1–1–2–2	0	Won eighthfinals against Malmö (2–0); Lost in quarterfinals against Växjö (0–4)
2021–22	Tier 1	SHL	6th	22–6–4–20	6,020	Top scorer: (Sweden) J. Nygård (41 pts); Top goalie: (Sweden) D. Hildeby (93.08 SV%)
2021–22	Swedish Championship playoffs		—	10–2–1–6	8,142	Won in quarterfinals against Skellefteå (4–2); Won in semifinals against Rögle (4–2); Won in finals against Luleå (4–3); (gold) 2022 Swedish Champions (10th title)
2022–23	Tier 1	SHL	3rd	24–7–4–17	7,296	Top scorer: (Sweden) J. Nygård (38 pts); Top goalie: (Sweden) D. Hildeby (91.80 SV%)
2022–23	Swedish Championship playoffs		—	3–0–0–4	8,250	Lost in quarterfinals against Frölunda (3–4)
2023–24	Tier 1	SHL	1st	30–3–8–11	7,404	Top scorer: (Czech Republic) D. Tomášek (45 pts); Top goalie: (Canada) M. Lagacé (91.90 SV%)
2023–24	Swedish Championship playoffs		—	0–0–2–2	7,946	Lost in quarterfinals against Rögle (0–4)
2024–25	Tier 1	SHL	4th	23–6–7–16	7,588	Top scorer: (Czech Republic) D. Tomášek (57 pts); Top goalie: (Canada) M. Lagacé (88.70 SV%)
2024–25	Swedish Championship playoffs		—	2–0–1–3	8,220	Lost in quarterfinals against Skellefteå (2–4)

Source:stats.swehockey.

== Players ==
=== Current roster ===
No.	Nat	Player	Pos	S/G	Age	Acquired	Birthplace
28	(Sweden)	Emil Alba	RW	L	28	2024	Stockholm, Sweden
7	(Sweden)	Axel Bergkvist	D	L	25	2022	Insjön, Sweden
15	(Sweden)	Jack Berglund	C	L	19	2023	Karlstad, Sweden
27	(Sweden)	Gabriel Carlsson	D	L	29	2025	Örebro, Sweden
92	(Sweden)	Lucas Forsell	RW	R	22	2020	Västerås, Sweden
65	(Sweden)	Noel Fransén	D	L	20	2023	Karlstad, Sweden
12	(Sweden)	Christoffer Jansson	C	L	27	2025	Stockholm, Sweden
59	(Sweden)	Linus Johansson (C)	C	L	33	2021	Ljungby, Sweden
13	(Sweden)	Joel Kellman	C	L	31	2023	Tingsryd, Sweden
33	(Finland)	Emil Larmi	G	L	29	2025	Lahti, Finland
71	(Sweden)	Viktor Lodin	C	L	26	2024	Leksand, Sweden
32	(Sweden)	Magnus Nygren	D	R	35	2023	Karlstad, Sweden
11	(Sweden)	Joakim Nygård (A)	LW	L	33	2021	Stockholm, Sweden
73	(Sweden)	Adam Ollas Mattsson	D	L	29	2024	Stockholm, Sweden
39	(Canada)	Luke Philp	C	R	30	2025	Calgary, Alberta, Canada
48	(Sweden)	Filip Roos	D	L	27	2025	Göteborg, Sweden
29	(Sweden)	Oskar Steen	C	R	27	2024	Karlstad, Sweden
98	(Slovakia)	Marián Studenič	RW	L	27	2024	Skalica, Slovakia
35	(Sweden)	Melker Thelin	G	L	20	2025	Umeå, Sweden
96	(Czech Republic)	David Tomášek	RW	R	30	2025	Prague, Czech Republic
52	(Sweden)	August Tornberg	D	R	33	2022	Pajala, Sweden
6	(Sweden)	Albert Wikman	D	L	20	2025	Karlstad, Sweden
67	(Czech Republic)	Radim Zohorna	C	L	29	2025	Havlickuv Brod, Czech Republic
22	(Sweden)	Per Åslund	LW	L	39	2016	Kil, Sweden

Updated 26 July 2025.

=== Team captains ===
- Thomas Rundqvist 1987–1993
- Håkan Loob, 1993–1996
- Roger Johansson, 1996–1997
- Claes Eriksson, 1997–1998
- Jörgen Jönsson, 1998–2007
- Rickard Wallin, 2007–2009
- Sanny Lindström, 2009–2010
- Rickard Wallin, 2010–2013
- Ole-Kristian Tollefsen 2013–2015
- Magnus Nygren, 2015–2017
- Alexander Johansson, 2017–2018
- Mikael Wikstrand, 2018–2019
- Linus Johansson, 2019–2020
- Sebastian Erixon, 2020–2021
- Linus Johansson, 2021–

=== Retired numbers ===
Färjestad BK retired numbers
No.	Player	Position	Career	No. retirement
2	Tommy Samuelsson	D	1976-1995	14 December 1998
5	Håkan Loob	RW	1979-1983, 1989-1996	27 September 1996
9	Thomas Rundqvist	C	1978-1984, 1985-1993	14 December 1998
9	Ulf Sterner	LW	1967-68, 1969-1973	13 November 2001
17	Mathias Johansson	C	1990-2002, 2003-2008	24 November 2012
19	Peter Nordström	LW	1995-1998, 1999-2009	30 November 2019
21	Jörgen Jönsson	C	1995-1999, 2000-2009	26 December 2009
51	Rickard Wallin	C	1998-2002, 2005-2006, 2007–2009, 2010-2016	23 September 2017

== Club records and leaders ==
=== Regular season ===
Goals: 42 Håkan Loob (1982-83)
Assists: 36 Thomas Rhodin (2006-07)
Points: 76 Håkan Loob (1982-83)
Penalty Minutes: 213 Emil Kåberg (2004-05)
Career Goals: 262 Håkan Loob
Career Assists: 273 Jörgen Jönsson
Career Points: 500 Håkan Loob
Career Penalty Minutes: 546 Thomas Rhodin
Career Shutouts: 12 Daniel Henriksson
Career Games: 616 Mathias Johansson

=== Playoff season ===
Goals: 11 Rickard Wallin (2000-01)
Assists: 13 Jesper Mattsson (2005-06)
Points: 18 Marcel Jenni (2000-01), Jörgen Jönsson (2005-06)
Penalty Minutes: 84 Emil Kåberg (2004-05)
Career Goals: 43 Håkan Loob
Career Assists: 62 Jörgen Jönsson
Career Points: 102 Jörgen Jönsson
Career Penalty Minutes: 193 Peter Nordström
Career Shutouts: 5 Daniel Henriksson, Jonas Gustavsson (2008-09)
Career Games: 138 Peter Nordström

=== Total (Regular season + Playoffs) ===
Goals: 52 Håkan Loob (1982-83)
Assists: 41 Thomas Rhodin (2006-07)
Points: 90 Håkan Loob (1982-83)
Penalty Minutes: 297 Emil Kåberg (2004-05)
Career Goals: 305 Håkan Loob
Career Assists: 312 Thomas Rundqvist
Career Points: 566 Håkan Loob
Career Penalty Minutes: 703 Peter Nordström
Career Shutouts: 17 Daniel Henriksson
Career Games: 748 Mathias Johansson

== Trophies and awards ==
=== Team ===
- Swedish Championship regular season Swedish Hockey League (11): 1982, 1983, 1986, 1987, 1990, 1992, 2002, 2007, 2009, 2019, 2024
- Le Mat Trophy (10): 1981, 1986, 1988, 1997, 1998, 2002, 2006, 2009, 2011, 2022
- Spengler Cup (2): 1993, 1994; Runner Up 1989, 1992, 1997

== See also ==
- List of Färjestad BK players selected in the NHL entry draft

Preceded by Brynäs IF	Swedish ice hockey champions 1981	Succeeded by AIK
Preceded by Södertälje SK	Swedish ice hockey champions 1986	Succeeded by IF Björklöven
Preceded by IF Björklöven	Swedish ice hockey champions 1988	Succeeded by Djurgårdens IF
Preceded by Luleå HF	Swedish ice hockey champions 1997, 1998	Succeeded by Brynäs IF
Preceded by Djurgårdens IF	Swedish ice hockey champions 2002	Succeeded by Västra Frölunda HC
Preceded by Frölunda HC	Swedish ice hockey champions 2006	Succeeded by Modo Hockey
Preceded by HV71	Swedish ice hockey champions 2009	Succeeded by HV71
Preceded by HV71	Swedish ice hockey champions 2011	Succeeded by Brynäs IF
Preceded by Växjö Lakers	Swedish ice hockey champions 2022	Succeeded by Växjö Lakers
