= 1995 Sweden Hockey Games =

Ice hockey competition in Stockholm

Tournament details
- Host country: Sweden
- City: Stockholm
- Venue: 1 (in 1 host city)
- Dates: 9 – 12 February 1995
- Teams: 4

Final positions
- Champions: Sweden (2nd title)
- Runners-up: Russia
- Third place: Czech Republic
- Fourth place: Canada

Tournament statistics
- Games played: 6
- Goals scored: 38 (6.33 per game)
- Attendance: 40,082 (6,680 per game)
- Scoring leader: (Sweden) Tomas Forslund (4 points)

The 1995 Sweden Hockey Games was played between 9 and 12 February 1995 in Stockholm, Sweden. The Czech Republic, Sweden, Russia and Canada played a round-robin for a total of three games per team and six games in total. All of the games were played in the Globen in Stockholm, Sweden. The tournament was won by Sweden.

== Standings ==
Pos	Team	Pld	W	D	L	GF	GA	GD	Pts
1	Sweden	3	3	0	0	15	5	+10	9
2	Russia	3	1	1	1	10	9	+1	4
3	Czech Republic	3	1	1	1	8	8	0	4
4	Canada	3	0	0	3	5	16	−11	0

Source: swehockey

== Games ==
All times are local. Stockholm – (Central European Time – UTC+1)

9 February 1995	Czech Republic	4-4 (1–2, 1–1, 2–1)	Russia	Globen, Stockholm; Attendance: 3,255

Game reference

Referee:
(Sweden) Robert Lahti

07:00 – Libor Procházka (Pavel Patera, František Kaberle) (PP)	1-0
	1-1	14:41 – Stanislav Romanov (Andrei Tarasenko, Dmitry Krasotkin) (PP)
	1-2	19:45 – Vladimir Vorobiev (Ravil Yakubov, Igor Nikulin)
	1-3	31:42 – Oleg Belov (Andrei Tarasenko)
39:45 – Roman Meluzín (Pavel Janků)	2-3
41:35 – Martin Prochazka (Pavel Patera, František Kaberle) (PP)	3-3
56:00 – Martin Hosták	4-3
	4-4	47:25 – Alexej Salomatin

14 min
Penalties
20 min
25
Shots
36

9 February 1995	Sweden	7-4 (1–1, 2–1, 4–2)	Canada	Globen, Stockholm; Attendance: 12,021

Game reference

Referee:
(Russia) Leonid Vaisfeld

	0-1	11:20 – David St. Pierre (Jean Francois Jomphe, Mike Maneluk)
17:47 – Tomas Jonsson (Per Erik Eklund, Tomas Forslund)	1-1
23:09 – Tomas Forslund (Markus Ragnarsson)	2-1
23:47 – Erik Huusko (Markus Ragnarsson)	3-1
	3-2	25:41 – Mark Kaufmann (Chris Kontos)
45:45 – Tomas Forslund (Per Erik Eklund)	4-2
47:34 – Leif Rohlin (Daniel Rydmark)	5-2
	5-3	48:29 – Joe Savage (Mike Johnson)
	5-4	51:45 – Andy Schneider (PP)
52:33 – Tomas Forslund (Christer Olsson, Tomas Jonsson)	6-4
54:02 – Andreas Johansson (Stefan Nilsson)	7-4

6 min
Penalties
10 min
63
Shots
21

10 February 1995	Sweden	3-1 (2-0, 0-1, 1-0)	Czech Republic	Globen, Stockholm; Attendance: 7,360

Game reference

Referee:
(Russia) Leonid Vaisfeld

00:46 – Per Erik Eklund (Markus Åkerblom, Tomas Forslund)	1-0
18:21 – Robert Nordmark (Patrik Erickson, Niklas Eriksson)	2-0
	2-1	25:15 – Jiri Vykoukal (Jan Alinč) (PP)
44:19 – Markus Åkerblom (Tomas Forslund)	3-1

8 min
Penalties
6 min
23
Shots
23

10 February 1995	Russia	6-0 (2–0, 3–0, 1–0)	Canada	Globen, Stockholm; Attendance: 3,891

?	1-0
?	2-0
?	3-0
?	4-0
?	5-0
?	6-0

12 February 1995	Czech Republic	3-1 (1–1, 1–0, 1–0)	Canada	Globen, Stockholm; Attendance: 2,841

Game reference

Referee:
(Sweden) Peter Andersson

14:40 – Otakar Vejvoda (Martin Prochazka)	1-0
	1-1	19:10 – Jeff Sebastian
30:46 – Martin Hosták	2-1
36:01 – Roman Meluzín (Jiří Kučera, Jan Alinč)	3-1

16 min
Penalties
14 min
33
Shots
27

12 February 1995	Sweden	5-0 (2–0, 2–0, 1–0)	Russia	Globen, Stockholm; Attendance: 10,714

Game reference

Referee:
(Finland) Marko Lepaus

06:00 – Leif Rohlin (Roger Hansson, Niklas Eriksson)	1-0
06:14 – Andreas Johansson (Tommy Sjödin)	2-0
26:31 – Rikard Franzén (Leif Rohlin, Daniel Rydmark)	3-0
28:40 – Rikard Franzén (Patrik Erickson)	4-0
44:00 – Patrik Erickson (Roger Hansson, Niklas Eriksson)	5-0

10 min
Penalties
16 min
32
Shots
19

== Scoring leaders ==
Pos	Player	Country	GP	G	A	Pts	PIM	POS
1	Tomas Forslund	Sweden	3	3	1	4	2	F
2	Leif Rohlin	Sweden	3	2	1	3	0	D
3	Markus Åkerblom	Sweden	3	1	2	3	0	F
4	Patrik Erickson	Sweden	3	1	2	3	0	F
5	Niklas Eriksson	Sweden	3	0	3	3	2	F

GP = Games played; G = Goals; A = Assists; Pts = Points; +/− = Plus/minus; PIM = Penalties in minutes; POS = Position
Source: quanthockey

== Tournament awards ==
The tournament directorate named the following players in the tournament 1995:

- Best goalkeeper: (Czech Republic) Roman Turek
- Best defenceman: (Sweden) Magnus Ragnarsson
- Best forward: (Sweden) Per Erik Eklund

Media All-Star Team:

- Goaltender: (Czech Republic) Roman Turek
- Defence: (Sweden) Tomas Jonsson, (Czech Republic) František Kaberle
- Forwards: (Sweden) Tomas Forslund, (Sweden) Per Erik Eklund, (Sweden) Markus Åkerblom
