= 1994 Sweden Hockey Games =

Tournament details
- Host country: Sweden
- City: Stockholm
- Venue: 1 (in 1 host city)
- Dates: 3–6 February 1994
- Teams: 4

Final positions
- Champions: Czech Republic (1st title)
- Runners-up: Sweden
- Third place: Canada
- Fourth place: Russia

Tournament statistics
- Games played: 6
- Goals scored: 41 (6.83 per game)
- Attendance: 48,779 (8,130 per game)
- Scoring leader(s): (Czech Republic) Jiří Vykoukal (Canada) Paul Kariya (4 points)

The 1994 Sweden Hockey Games was played between 3 and 6 February 1994 in Stockholm, Sweden. The Czech Republic, Sweden, Russia and Canada played a round-robin for a total of four games per team and 10 games in total. All of the games were played in the Globen in Stockholm, Sweden. The tournament was won by Czech Republic.

== Standings ==
Pos	Team	Pld	W	D	L	GF	GA	GD	Pts
1	Czech Republic	3	3	0	0	12	2	+10	9
2	Sweden	3	1	0	2	9	10	−1	3
3	Russia	3	1	0	2	12	16	−4	3
4	Canada	3	1	0	2	8	13	−5	3

Source: swehockey

== Games ==
All times are local. Stockholm – (Central European Time – UTC+1)

3 February 1994	Czech Republic	5–0 (2–0, 0–0, 3–0)	Russia	Globen, Stockholm; Attendance: 1,000

Game reference

Petr Briza
Goalies

Referee:
(Sweden) Jörgen Grundström,

1–0
2–0
3–0
4–0
5–0

3 February 1994	Sweden	5–6 (3–2, 2–1, 0–3)	Canada	Globen, Stockholm; Attendance: 13,850

Game reference

Michael Sundlöf
Goalies

Referee:
(Finland) Seppo Mäkelä

02:00 – Mats Näslund	1–0
06:00 – Andreas Dackell	2–0
11:00 – Daniel Rydmark	3–0
	3–1	17:00 – Jean-Yves Roy
	3–2	20:00 – Chris Kontos
23:00 – Charles Berglund	4–2
	4–3	25:00 – Mark Astle
30:00 – Tomas Jonsson	5–3
	5–4	51:00 – Paul Kariya
	5–5	54:00 – Dwayne Norris
	5–6	60:00 – Pavel Nedved

10 min
Penalties
26 min
38
Shots
32

4 February 1994	Czech Republic	2–1 (1–0, 1–1, 0–0)	Sweden	Globen, Stockholm; Attendance: 11,229

Game reference

Roman Turek
Goalies
Håkan Algotsson
Referee:
(Finland) Seppo Mäkelä

17:44 – Roman Horák	1–0
	1–1	29:17 – Jonas Bergqvist (Peter Forsberg)
36:06 – Jiří Vykoukal (PP)	2–1

8 min
Penalties
20 min
25
Shots
20

4 February 1994	Russia	6–5 (1–1, 1–2, 4–2)	Canada	Globen, Stockholm; Attendance: 6,023

Game reference

Referee:
(Czech Republic) Petr Bolina

01:16 – Valeri Bezukadnikov (Dimitri Starostenko, Oleg Shargorodsk)	1–0
	1–1	13:31 – Wally Schreiber (Ken Lovsin, Chris Therien)
	1–2	22:12 – Greg Parks (Brian Savage, Paul Kariya)
33:50 – Sergei Berezin (Alexander Smirnov, Oleg Davydov) (PP)	2–2
	2–3	34:26 – Todd Warriner (Greg Johnson)
41:14 – Pavel Torgayev (Valeri Bezukadnikov, Alexander Vinogradov )	3–3
	3–4	54:51 – Petr Nedved (Greg Johnson) (PP)
55:43 – Ravil Muftiev	4–4
56:35 – Alexander Vinogradov (Sergei Sorokin)	5–4
	5–5	57:55 – Dwayne Norris (Wally Schreiber, Brian Savage)
59:59 – Valeri Bezukadnikov (Andrei Nikolishin, Alexander Smirnov)	6–5

6 min
Penalties
16 min
37
Shots
30

6 February 1994	Czech Republic	5–1 (2–0, 2–0, 1–1)	Canada	Globen, Stockholm; Attendance: 2,923

Game reference

Petr Briza
Goalies

Referee:
(Sweden) Börje Johansson

05:35 – Petr Hrbek (PP)	1–0
09:18 – Richard Žemlička (Jiří Vykoukal, Miloslav Hořava) (PP)	2–0
32:43 – Petr Hrbek (Jiří Vykoukal, Richard Žemlička) (PP)	3–0
38:59 – Richard Žemlička (Pavel Geffert, Petr Hrbek)	4–0
47:17 – Jiří Vykoukal (Jan Alinč)	5–0
	5–1	45:10 – Chris Therien (Wally Schreiber)

16 min
Penalties
16 min
32
Shots
27

6 February 1994	Sweden	3–2 (0–1, 2–1, 1–0)	Russia	Globen, Stockholm; Attendance: 13,754

Game reference

Referee:
(Czech Republic) Petr Bolina

	0–1	08:41 – Alexei Kudashov (Ravil Gusmanov)
23:35 – Magnus Svensson (Roger Johansson) (PP)	1–1
28:55 – Leif Rohlin (Mats Näslund, Christian Due-Boje)	2–1
	2–2	36:44 – Oleg Shargorodsky (Sergei Sorokin, Alexej Kedasjov) (PP)
41:24 – Peter Forsberg	3–2

10 min
Penalties
20 min
22
Shots
23

== Scoring leaders ==
Pos	Player	Country	GP	G	A	Pts	PIM	POS
1	Jiří Vykoukal	Czech Republic	3	2	2	4	0	D
2	Paul Kariya	Canada	3	1	3	4	0	F
3	Richard Žemlička	Czech Republic	3	2	1	3	0	F
4	Petr Hrbek	Czech Republic	3	2	1	3	0	F
5	Vyacheslav Bezukladnikov	Russia	3	2	1	3	6	F

GP = Games played; G = Goals; A = Assists; Pts = Points; +/− = Plus/minus; PIM = Penalties in minutes; POS = Position
Source: quanthockey
