= 2004 Sweden Hockey Games =

Tournament details
- Host countries: Sweden; Finland
- Cities: Stockholm; Helsinki
- Venues: 2 (in 2 host cities)
- Dates: 5-8 February 2004
- Teams: 4

Final positions
- Champions: Sweden (7th title)
- Runners-up: Czech Republic
- Third place: Russia
- Fourth place: Finland

Tournament statistics
- Games played: 6
- Goals scored: 29 (4.83 per game)
- Attendance: 57,216 (9,536 per game)
- Scoring leader: (Sweden) Johan Davidsson (6 points)

The 2004 Sweden Hockey Games was played between 5 and 8 February 2004 in Stockholm, Sweden. The Czech Republic, Finland, Sweden and Russia played a round-robin for a total of three games per team and six games in total. Five of the matches were played in the Globen in Stockholm, Sweden, and one match in the Hartwall Arena in Helsinki, Finland. The tournament was won by Sweden. The tournament was part of 2003–04 Euro Hockey Tour.

== Standings ==
Pos	Team	Pld	W	OTW	OTL	L	GF	GA	GD	Pts
1	Sweden	3	3	0	0	0	13	3	+10	9
2	Czech Republic	3	1	1	0	1	5	7	−2	5
3	Russia	3	1	1	0	1	9	9	0	5
4	Finland	3	0	0	2	1	2	10	−8	2

Source: swehockey

== Games ==
All times are local. Stockholm – (Central European Time – UTC+1) Helsinki – (Eastern European Time – UTC+2)

5 February 2004; 18:30	Czech Republic	2-1 (0-0, 1-0, 1-1)	Finland	Hartwall Areena, Helsinki; Attendance: 6,681

Game reference

Roman Málek
Goalies
Fredrik Norrena
Referee:
(Sweden) Marcus Vinnerborg
Linesmen:
(Finland) Mikko Kekäläinen
(Finland) Jussi Terho

34:07 – Tomáš Vlasák (Jiří Vykoukal) (PP)	1-0
	1-1	44:57 – Kimmo Kuhta (Tomi Kallio)
48:54 – Jan Novák (Jaroslav Hlinka, Tomáš Vlasák)	2-1

20 min
Penalties
6 min
17
Shots
37

5 February 2004; 19:30	Russia	3-5 (1-1, 2-2, 0-2)	Sweden	Globen, Stockholm; Attendance: 8,160

Game reference

Maxim Sokolov
Goalies
Henrik Lundqvist
Referee:
(Czech Republic) Milan Minar
Linesmen:
(Sweden) Mikael Ljungqvist
(Sweden) Nicklas Smedman

11:02 – Oleg Tverdovsky (Alexander Prokopyev, Maxim Sushinsky)	1-0
	1-1	13:53 – Magnus Kahnberg (Niklas Andersson, Thomas Rhodin)
	1-2	21:34 – Per Gustafsson (Johan Davidsson) (PP)
25:09 – Valeri Zelepukin (Sergei Zinovjev)	2-2
31:53 – Alexandre Boikov (Dmitri Yushkevich, Maxim Sushinsky) (PP)	3-2
	3-3	36:57 – Jörgen Jönsson (Peter Nordström)
	3-4	51:26 – Jonas Höglund
	3-5	53:24 – Niklas Nordgren (Jonathan Hedström)

8 min
Penalties
6 min
21
Shots
33

7 February 2004; 12:00	Finland	1-4 (0-0, 0-4, 1-0)	Russia	Globen, Stockholm; Attendance: 11,063

Game reference

Niklas Bäckström
Goalies
Yegor Podomatsky
Referee:
(Sweden) Christer Lärking
Linesmen:
(Sweden) Fredrik Ulriksson
(Sweden) Nicklas Smedman

	0-1	29:45 – Sergei Krivokrasov (Oleg Tverdovsky) (PP)
	0-2	36:32 – Oleg Tverdovsky (Alexander Prokopyev) (PP)
	0-3	37:28 – Alexander Ovechkin
	0-4	38:15 – Aleksandr Guskov (Maxim Sushinsky)
42:13 – Kimmo Kuhta	1-4

24 min
Penalties
18 min
22
Shots
20

7 February 2004; 15:30	Sweden	4-0 (1-0, 1-0, 2-0)	Czech Republic	Globen, Stockholm; Attendance: 13,850

Game reference

Henrik Lundqvist
Goalies
Dušan Salfický
Referee:
(Russia) Alexander Polyakov
Linesmen:
(Sweden) Anders Karlberg
(Sweden) Leo Takula

10:43 – Niklas Andersson (Tommy Sjödin, Johan Davidsson) (PP)	1-0
21:03 – Magnus Kahnberg (Johan Davidsson)	2-0
41:22– Johan Davidsson (Andreas Salomonsson)	3-0
51:31 – Fredrik Bremberg (Mikael Karlberg)	4-0

8 February 2004; 12:30	Czech Republic	3-2 OT (1-0, 0-1, 1 1) (OT: 1–0)	Russia	Globen, Stockholm; Attendance: 3,612

Game reference

Roman Málek
Goalies
Yegor Podomatsky
Referee:
(Sweden) Thomas Andersson
Linesmen:
(Sweden) Anders Karlberg
(Sweden) Fredrik Ulriksson

03:37 – Petr Průcha (Tomáš Divíšek)	1-0
	1-1	27:42 – Sergei Zinovjev (Valeri Zelepukin)
	1-2	48:46 – Oleg Tverdovsky (Maxim Sushinsky) (PP)
50:56 – Radek Hamr (Josef Marha)	2-2
64:47 – Tomáš Vlasák	3-2

10 min
Penalties
8 min
36
Shots
36

8 February 2004; 16:00	Sweden	4-0 (2-0, 0-0, 2-0)	Finland	Globen, Stockholm; Attendance: 13,850

Game reference

Daniel Henriksson
Goalies
Fredrik Norrena
Referee:
(Russia) Alexander Polyakov
Linesmen:
(Sweden) Mikael Ljungqvist
(Sweden) Leo Takula

07:28 – Jörgen Jönsson (Jonas Höglund)	1-0
14:59 – Johan Davidsson (Niklas Andersson, Magnus Kahnberg) (PP)	2-0
43:53 – Johan Davidsson (Magnus Kahnberg)	3-0
54:25 – Jonas Höglund (Thomas Johansson, Jörgen Jönsson)	4-0

12 min
Penalties
8 min
18
Shots
29

== Scoring leaders ==
Pos	Player	Country	GP	G	A	Pts	+/−	PIM	POS
1	Johan Davidsson	Sweden	3	3	#	6	+4	0	LW
2	Oleg Tverdovsky	Russia	3	3	1	4	+2	0	RD
3	Magnus Kahnberg	Sweden	3	2	2	4	+3	0	LW
4	Maxim Sushinsky	Russia	3	0	4	4	+2	2	LD
5	Tomáš Vlasák	Czech Republic	3	2	1	3	+1	0	RW

GP = Games played; G = Goals; A = Assists; Pts = Points; +/− = Plus/minus; PIM = Penalties in minutes; POS = Position
Source: swehockey

== Goaltending leaders ==
Pos	Player	Country	TOI	GA	GAA	Sv%	SO
1	Roman Málek	Czech Republic	124:47	3	1.44	95.89	0
2	Yegor Podomatsky	Russia	124:09	4	1.93	93.10	0
3	Henrik Lundqvist	Sweden	120:00	3	1.50	92.68	1
4	Fredrik Norrena	Finland	156:15	9	3.46	81.63	0

TOI = Time on ice (minutes:seconds); SA = Shots against; GA = Goals against; GAA = Goals Against Average; Sv% = Save percentage; SO = Shutouts
Source: swehockey

== Tournament awards ==
The tournament directorate named the following players in the tournament 2004:

- Best goalkeeper: (Czech Republic) Roman Málek
- Best defenceman: (Russia) Oleg Tverdovsky
- Best forward: (Sweden) Johan Davidsson

Media All-Star Team:

- Goaltender: (Czech Republic) Roman Málek
- Defence: (Sweden) Per Gustafsson, (Russia) Oleg Tverdovsky
- Forwards: (Finland) Kimmo Kuhta, (Sweden) Johan Davidsson, (Czech Republic) Tomáš Vlasák
