= 2005 Sweden Hockey Games =

Tournament details
- Host countries: Sweden; Finland
- Cities: Stockholm; Tampere
- Venues: 2 (in 2 host cities)
- Dates: 10-13 February 2005
- Teams: 4

Final positions
- Champions: Sweden (8th title)
- Runners-up: Czech Republic
- Third place: Russia
- Fourth place: Finland

Tournament statistics
- Games played: 6
- Goals scored: 35 (5.83 per game)
- Attendance: 57,845 (9,641 per game)
- Scoring leader: (Sweden) Henrik Zetterberg (5 points)

The 2005 Sweden Hockey Games was played between 10 and 13 February 2005 in Stockholm, Sweden. The Czech Republic, Finland, Sweden and Russia played a round-robin for a total of three games per team and six games in total. Five of the matches were played in the Globen in Stockholm, Sweden, and one match in the Tampere Ice Stadium in Tampere, Finland. The tournament was won by Sweden. The tournament was part of 2004–05 Euro Hockey Tour.

== Standings ==
Pos	Team	Pld	W	OTW	OTL	L	GF	GA	GD	Pts
1	Sweden	3	2	1	0	0	11	5	+6	8
2	Czech Republic	3	1	1	1	0	6	15	−9	6
3	Russia	3	0	1	0	2	16	13	+3	2
4	Finland	3	0	0	2	1	8	4	+4	2

Source: swehockey

== Games ==
All times are local. Stockholm – (Central European Time – UTC+1) Tampere – (Eastern European Time – UTC+2)

10 February 2006; 18:30	Russia	4-3 OT (1-2, 2-1, 0-0) (OT: 1 –0)	Finland	Tampere Ice Stadium, Tampere; Attendance: 7,482

Game reference

Maxim Sokolov
Goalies
Pasi Nurminen
Referee:
(Sweden) Marcus Vinnerborg
Linesmen:
(Finland) Stefan Fonselius
(Finland) Antti Orelma

	0-1	01:31 – Timo Pärssinen (Jukka Hentunen)
09:07 – Alexei Kovalev (Alexei Kaigorodov) (PP)	1-1
	1-2	10:49 – Pasi Puistola (Tomi Kallio Esa Pirnes) (PP)
25:54 – Fedor Fedorov (Petr Schastlivy)	2-2
	2-3	27:43 – Timo Pärssinen (Jukka Hentunen)
28:44 – Vladimir Antipov	3-3
61:25 – Alexei Kaigorodov (Alexei Kovalev, Andrei Markov) (PP)	4-3

6 min
Penalties
8 min
33
Shots
28

10 February 2006; 19:00	Czech Republic	2-3 GWS (1-1, 1-1, 0-0) (OT: 0–0) (SO: 0–1)	Sweden	Globen, Stockholm; Attendance: 10,257

Game reference

Milan Hnilička
Goalies
Henrik Lundqvist
Referee:
(Russia) RafaelKadyrov
Linesmen:
(Sweden) Per Svensson
(Sweden) Mikael Ljungqvist

	0-1	05:39 – Andreas Johansson (Henrik Zetterberg, Magnus Johansson)
16:05 – Václav Prospal (Radek Dvořák, Jan Bulis)	1-1
25:16 – Jan Hlaváč (Tomáš Kaberle)	2-1
	2-2	31:15 – Andreas Johansson (Magnus Kahnberg) (PP)

Bednář (miss)
Erat (miss)
Židlický (miss)
Balaštík (miss)
Shootout
(miss) Zetterberg
(miss) Modin
(miss) Kahnberg
Weinhandl
14 min
Penalties
18 min
28
Shots
31

12 February 2006; 12:00	Finland	2-3 OT (0-1, 0-0, 2-1) (OT: 0–1)	Czech Republic	Globen, Stockholm; Attendance: 11,107

Game reference
Mika Noronen	Goalies	Adam Svoboda	Referee: (Sweden) Thomas Andersson; Linesmen: (Sweden) Joacim Karlsson (Sweden) Leo Takula
50:29 – Timo Pärssinen (Petri Pakaslahti, Mikko Luoma); 53:10 – Toni Söderholm (Petri Pakaslahti) / Goals / 14:01 – Josef Vašíček (Jaroslav Bednář); 59:25 – David Výborný (Václav Prospal, Marek Židlický); 62:04 – Jaroslav Bednář (Petr Kadlec)			Referee: (Sweden) Thomas Andersson; Linesmen: (Sweden) Joacim Karlsson (Sweden) Leo Takula
14 min	Penalties	10 min	Referee: (Sweden) Thomas Andersson; Linesmen: (Sweden) Joacim Karlsson (Sweden) Leo Takula
29	Shots	50	Referee: (Sweden) Thomas Andersson; Linesmen: (Sweden) Joacim Karlsson (Sweden) Leo Takula

12 February 2006; 15:30	Sweden	3-2 (1-2, 0-0, 2-0)	Russia	Globen, Stockholm; Attendance: 13,362

Game reference

Henrik Lundqvist
Goalies
Maxim Sokolov
Referee:
(Czech Republic) Milan Minar
Linesmen:
(Sweden) Anders Karlberg
(Sweden) Mikael Ljungqvist

	0-1	02:03 – Dmitri Afanasenkov (Petr Schastlivy)
	0-2	11:23 – Alexander Frolov (Artem Chubarov, Vladimir Antipov) (PP)
15:29 – Magnus Kahnberg (Magnus Johansson) (PP)	1-2
46:02 – Mikael Samuelsson (Christian Bäckman)	2-2
56:25 – Jonathan Hedström (Henrik Zetterberg, Fredrik Modin)	3-2

8 min
Penalties
8 min
23
Shots
27

13 February 2006; 12:00	Czech Republic	4-3 (1-0, 1-0, 2-3)	Russia	Globen, Stockholm; Attendance: 2,317

Game reference

Milan Hnilička
Goalies
Alexei Yegorov
Referee:
(Sweden) Ulf Rönnmark
Linesmen:
(Sweden) Anders Karlberg
(Sweden) Peter Lyth

17:03 – Marek Židlický (Václav Prospal)	1-0
37:45 – Jan Hlaváč (David Výborný, Radek Dvořák)	2-0
41:01 – Jan Bulis (Václav Prospal, Radek Dvořák)	3-0
	3-1	41:58 – Dmitri Afanasenkov (Alexei Simakov)
54:05 – Jan Hlaváč (David Výborný)	4-1
	4-2	56:02 – Aleksandr Ryazantsev (Anton Kuryanov, Alexei Simakov)
	4-3	59:58 – Denis Denisov (Aleksandr Ryazantsev, Anton Kuryanov)

28 min
Penalties
37 min
33
Shots
28

13 February 2006; 15:30	Sweden	5-1 (0-0, 3-0, 2-1)	Finland	Globen, Stockholm; Attendance: 13,320

Game reference

Henrik Lundqvist
Goalies
Pasi Nurminen
Referee:
(Czech Republic) Milan Minar
Linesmen:
(Sweden) Joacim Karlsson
(Sweden) Leo Takula

20:52 – Dick Tärnström (Henrik Zetterberg)	1-0
28:16 – Nils Ekman (Johan Davidsson, Thomas Johansson)	2-0
36:17 – Henrik Zetterberg (Jonathan Hedström) (PP)	3-0
	3-1	45:03 – Marko Jantunen
53:11 – Jonathan Hedström (Magnus Kahnberg, Henrik Zetterberg)	4-1
59:08 – Mattias Weinhandl (Jörgen Jönsson)	5-1

10 min
Penalties
35 min
35
Shots
28

== Scoring leaders ==
Pos	Player	Country	GP	G	A	Pts	+/−	PIM	POS
1	Henrik Zetterberg	Sweden	3	1	4	5	+4	0	LW
2	Václav Prospal	Czech Republic	3	1	3	4	+3	0	CE
3	Jan Hlaváč	Czech Republic	3	3	0	3	+4	0	LW
4	Timo Pärssinen	Finland	3	2	1	3	+3	2	LW
5	Jonathan Hedström	Sweden	3	1	2	3	+3	2	LW

GP = Games played; G = Goals; A = Assists; Pts = Points; +/− = Plus/minus; PIM = Penalties in minutes; POS = Position
Source: swehockey

== Goaltending leaders ==
Pos	Player	Country	TOI	GA	GAA	Sv%	SO
1	Henrik Lundqvist	Sweden	185:00	5	1.62	93.98	0
2	Milan Hnilička	Czech Republic	125:01	6	2.88	89.83	0
3	Maxim Sokolov	Russia	120:50	6	2.98	88.24	0
4	Pasi Nurminen	Finland	121:25	9	4.45	86.96	0

TOI = Time on ice (minutes:seconds); SA = Shots against; GA = Goals against; GAA = Goals Against Average; Sv% = Save percentage; SO = Shutouts
Source: swehockey

== Tournament awards ==
The tournament directorate named the following players in the tournament 2005:

- Best goalkeeper: (Sweden) Henrik Lundqvist
- Best defenceman: (Czech Republic) Marek Židlický
- Best forward: (Sweden) Henrik Zetterberg

Media All-Star Team:

- Goaltender: (Sweden) Henrik Lundqvist
- Defence: (Sweden) Thomas Rhodin, (Czech Republic) Marek Židlický
- Forwards: (Russia) Ilya Kovalchuk, (Sweden) Henrik Zetterberg, (Finland) Timo Pärssinen
