= 1992 Sweden Hockey Games =

Ice hockey competition in Stockholm

Tournament details
- Host country: Sweden
- City: Stockholm
- Venue: 1 (in 1 host city)
- Dates: 30 January – 2 February 1992
- Teams: 4

Final positions
- Champions: Canada (1st title)
- Runners-up: CIS
- Third place: Czechoslovakia
- Fourth place: Sweden

Tournament statistics
- Games played: 6
- Goals scored: 23 (3.83 per game)
- Attendance: 39,875 (6,646 per game)
- Scoring leader: (Canada) Wally Schreiber (3 points)

The 1992 Sweden Hockey Games was played between 30 January and 2 February 1992 in Stockholm, Sweden. The Czech Republic, Sweden, CIS and Canada played a round-robin for a total of three games per team and six games in total. All of the games were played in the Globen in Stockholm, Sweden. The tournament was won by Canada.

== Standings ==
Pos	Team	Pld	W	D	L	GF	GA	GD	Pts
1	Canada	3	2	1	0	7	4	+3	7
2	CIS	3	1	1	1	5	6	−1	4
3	Czechoslovakia	3	1	0	2	4	7	−3	3
4	Sweden	3	1	0	2	7	6	+1	3

Source: swehockey

== Games ==
All times are local. Stockholm – (Central European Time – UTC+1)

30 January 1992	CIS	2-0 (2-0, 0-0, 0-0)	Czechoslovakia	Globen, Stockholm; Attendance: 2,480

Game reference
Andrei Trefilov	Goalies	Petr Briza
– German Titov (PP) / 1-0; – Dimitri Motkov / 2-0

30 January 1992	Sweden	1-2 (1-1, 0-0, 0-1)	Canada	Globen, Stockholm; Attendance: 12,421

Game reference

Tommy Söderström
Goalies
Sean Burke
Referee:
(Czechoslovakia) Anton Danko

01:00 – Bengt-Åke Gustafsson	1-0
	1-1	05:00 – Patrick Lebea (PP)
	1-2	46:38 – Curt Giles

48
Shots
16

31 January 1992	Canada	2-2 (2-1, 0-0, 0-1)	CIS	Globen, Stockholm; Attendance: 2,076

Game reference

Sean Burke
Goalies
Andrei Trefilov
Referee:
(Sweden) Börje Johansson

– Eric Lindros	1-0
	1-1	– Vitali Karamnov
– Gord Hynes	2-1
	2-2	– Ravil Yakubov

31 January 1992	Sweden	2-3 (1-0, 0-0, 1-3)	Czechoslovakia	Globen, Stockholm; Attendance: 7,452

Game reference

Tommy Söderström
Goalies
Petr Briza
Referee:
(Norway) Tor Hansen

05:00 – Mats Näslund	1-0
	1-1	42:00 – Peter Veselovský
	1-2	00:00 – Miloslav Hořava
51:00 – Kenneth Kennholt (PP)	2-2
	2-3	55:00 – Tomáš Jelínek

2 February 1992	Czechoslovakia	1-3 (0-0, 0-1, 1-2)	Canada	Globen, Stockholm; Attendance: 4,000

Game reference

Petr Briza
Goalies
Trevor Kidd

	0-1	– Adrien Plavsic
– Robert Lang	1-1
	1-2	– Randy Smith
	1-3	– Wally Schreiber

2 February 1992	Sweden	4-1 (3-0, 1-0, 0-1)	CIS	Globen, Stockholm; Attendance: 11,446

Roger Nordström
Goalies
Andrei Trefilov
Referee:
(Czechoslovakia) Anton Danko

01:00 – Lars Edström	1-0
17:00 – Bengt-Åke Gustafsson	2-0
18:00 – Patrik Erickson	3-0
24:00 – Kenneth Kennholt	4-0
	4-1	42:00 – Ravil Yakubov

== Scoring leaders ==
Pos	Player	Country	GP	G	A	Pts	PIM	POS
1	Wally Schreiber	Canada	3	1	2	3	2	F
2	Kenneth Kennholt	Canada	3	2	0	2	2	D
3	Ravil Yakubov	CIS	3	2	0	2	6	F
4	Randy Smith	Canada	2	1	1	2	0	F
5	Bengt-Åke Gustafsson	Sweden	3	1	1	2	0	F

GP = Games played; G = Goals; A = Assists; Pts = Points; +/− = Plus/minus; PIM = Penalties in minutes; POS = Position
Source: quanthockey

== Tournament awards ==
The tournament directorate named the following players in the tournament 1992:

Media All-Star Team:

- Goaltender: (Canada) Sean Burke
- Defence: (Sweden) Kenneth Kennholt, (Canada) Curt Giles
- Forwards: (Czechoslovakia) Igor Liba, (Sweden) Bengt-Åke Gustafsson, (Sweden) Håkan Loob
