= OHG =

OHG may refer to:

- Oddset Hockey Games, an annual ice hockey event held in Sweden
- Old High German, the earliest stage of the German language, from around 500 to 1050 AD
- Offene Handelsgesellschaft, a type of business entity in Germany, equivalent to a general partnership
