= 2001 Sweden Hockey Games (February) =

Tournament details
- Host countries: Sweden; Czech Republic
- Cities: Stockholm; Pardubice
- Venues: 2 (in 2 host cities)
- Dates: 6-11 February 2001
- Teams: 5

Final positions
- Champions: Sweden (5th title)
- Runners-up: Finland
- Third place: Canada
- Fourth place: Czech Republic

Tournament statistics
- Games played: 10
- Goals scored: 51 (5.1 per game)
- Attendance: 71,444 (7,144 per game)
- Scoring leader: (Finland) Timo Pärssinen (5 points)

The 2001 (February) Sweden Hockey Games was played between 6 and 11 February 2001 in Stockholm, Sweden. The Czech Republic, Finland, Sweden, Russia and Canada played a round-robin for a total of four games per team and 10 games in total. Five of the matches were played in the Globen in Stockholm, Sweden, and one match in the Aréna Pardubice in Pardubice, Czech Republic. The tournament was won by Sweden. The tournament was part of 2000–01 Euro Hockey Tour.

Games against Canada was not included in the 2000–01 Euro Hockey Tour.

== Standings ==
Pos	Team	Pld	W	OTW	OTL	L	GF	GA	GD	Pts
1	Sweden	4	3	0	0	1	10	5	+5	9
2	Finland	4	2	1	0	1	14	8	+6	8
3	Canada	4	2	0	0	2	13	16	−3	6
4	Czech Republic	4	1	0	1	2	6	9	−3	4
5	Russia	4	1	0	0	3	8	13	−5	3

Source: swehockey

== Games ==
All times are local. Stockholm – (Central European Time – UTC+1) Pardubice – (Central European Time – UTC+1)

6 February 2001; 16:30	Russia	2-1 (0-0, 1-0, 1-1)	Czech Republic	Aréna Pardubice, Pardubice; Attendance: 8,105

Game reference

6 February 2001; 19:00	Canada	1-5 (1-0, 0-4, 0-1)	Sweden	Globen, Stockholm; Attendance: 9,464

Game reference

7 February 2001; 19:00	Finland	3-2 OT (1-2, 0-0, 1-0) (OT: 1–0)	Czech Republic	Globen, Stockholm; Attendance: 2,431

Game reference

8 February 2001; 15:30	Finland	6-3 (1-2, 5-1, 0-0)	Canada	Globen, Stockholm; Attendance: 1,476

Game reference

8 February 2001; 19:00	Sweden	2-1 (1-0, 1-1, 0-0)	Russia	Globen, Stockholm; Attendance: 9,321

Game reference

9 February 2001; 19:00	Czech Republic	1-3 (0-0, 1-2, 0-1)	Canada	Globen, Stockholm; Attendance: 2,528

Game reference

10 February 2001; 12:00	Russia	1-4 (0-1, 1-1, 0-2)	Finland	Globen, Stockholm; Attendance: 6,398

Game reference

10 February 2001; 15:30	Czech Republic	2-1 (0-1, 1-0, 1-0)	Sweden	Globen, Stockholm; Attendance: 13,850

Game reference

11 February 2001; 13:00	Canada	6-4 (1-2, 3-0, 2-2)	Russia	Globen, Stockholm; Attendance: 4,021

Game reference

11 February 2001; 17:00	Sweden	2-1 (1-1, 1-0, 0-0)	Finland	Globen, Stockholm; Attendance: 13,850

Game reference

== Scoring leaders ==
Pos	Player	Country	GP	G	A	Pts	+/−	PIM	POS
1	Timo Pärssinen	Finland	3	2	3	5	+2	0	F
2	Daniel Marois	Canada	4	2	3	5	-1	8	F
3	Greg Parks	Canada	4	3	1	4	+1	6	F
4	Jukka Hentunen	Finland	4	2	2	4	-1	4	F
5	Fredrik Olausson	Sweden	4	0	4	4	+3	2	F

GP = Games played; G = Goals; A = Assists; Pts = Points; +/− = Plus/minus; PIM = Penalties in minutes; POS = Position
Source: swehockey

== Tournament awards ==
The tournament directorate named the following players in the tournament 2001 (February):

- Best goalkeeper: (Sweden) Mikael Tellqvist
- Best defenceman: (Sweden) Fredrik Olausson
- Best forward: (Finland) Jukka Hentunen

Media All-Star Team:

- Goaltender: (Czech Republic) Dusan Salficky
- Defence: (Finland) Janne Grönvall, (Sweden) Fredrik Olausson
- Forwards: (Finland) Jukka Hentunen, (Sweden) Jörgen Jönsson, (Finland) Timo Pärssinen
