= 2001 Sweden Hockey Games (November) =

Tournament details
- Host countries: Sweden; Finland
- Cities: Stockholm; Helsinki
- Venues: 2 (in 2 host cities)
- Dates: 6-11 November 2001
- Teams: 5

Final positions
- Champions: Sweden (6th title)
- Runners-up: Czech Republic
- Third place: Finland
- Fourth place: Russia

Tournament statistics
- Games played: 10
- Goals scored: 60 (6 per game)
- Attendance: 66,118 (6,612 per game)

The 2001 (November) Sweden Hockey Games was played between 6 and 11 November 2001 in Stockholm, Sweden. The Czech Republic, Finland, Sweden, Russia and Canada played a round-robin for a total of four games per team and 10 games in total. Five of the matches were played in the Globen in Stockholm, Sweden, and one match in the Hartwall Arena in Helsinki, Finland. The tournament was won by Sweden. The tournament was part of 2001–02 Euro Hockey Tour.

Games against Canada was not included in the 2001–02 Euro Hockey Tour.

== Standings ==
Pos	Team	Pld	W	OTW	OTL	L	GF	GA	GD	Pts
1	Sweden	4	2	1	1	0	15	9	+6	9
2	Czech Republic	4	2	1	0	1	14	7	+7	8
3	Finland	4	2	0	0	2	12	17	−5	6
4	Russia	4	1	1	1	1	9	10	−1	6
5	Canada	4	0	0	1	3	10	17	−7	1

Source: swehockey

== Games ==
All times are local. Stockholm – (Central European Time – UTC+1) Helsinki – (Eastern European Time – UTC+2)

6 November 2001; 18:00	Finland	2-7 (1–4, 0–2, 1–1)	Czech Republic	Hartwall Areena, Helsinki; Attendance: 7,725

Game reference

6 November 2001; 19:00	Sweden	7-4 (3–0, 4–2, 0–2)	Canada	Globen, Stockholm; Attendance: 8,718

Game reference

7 November 2001; 19:00	Russia	3-2 GWS (2–0, 0–1, 0–1) (OT: 0–0) (SO: 1–0)	Canada	Globen, Stockholm; Attendance: 2,519

Game reference

8 November 2001; 15:30	Finland	4-2 (2–1, 1–0, 1–1)	Russia	Globen, Stockholm; Attendance: 814

Game reference

8 November 2001; 19:00	Sweden	1-2 OT (1–0, 0–1, 0–0) (OT: 0–1)	Czech Republic	Globen, Stockholm; Attendance: 9,207

Game reference

9 November 2001; 19:00	Czech Republic	3-1 (1–0, 1–1, 1–0)	Canada	Globen, Stockholm; Attendance: 2,859

Game reference

10 November 2001; 12:00	Canada	3-4 (0–2, 3–0, 0–2)	Finland	Globen, Stockholm; Attendance: 4,499

Game reference

10 November 2001; 15:30	Russia	1-2 GWS (0–0, 0–1, 1–0) (OT: 0–0) (SO: 0–1)	Sweden	Globen, Stockholm; Attendance: 12,043

Game reference

11 November 2001; 13:00	Czech Republic	2-3 (0–1, 1–1, 1–1)	Russia	Globen, Stockholm; Attendance: 3,884

Game reference

11 November 2001; 17:00	Sweden	5-2 (1–0, 2–2, 2–0)	Finland	Globen, Stockholm; Attendance: 13,850

Game reference

== Scoring leaders ==
Pos	Player	Country	GP	G	A	Pts	PIM	POS
1	Henrik Zetterberg	Sweden	4	4	3	7	2	F
2	Valeri Karpov	Russia	4	1	5	6	4	F
3	Mattias Weinhandl	Sweden	4	2	3	5	2	F
4	Jani Hassinen	Finland	4	2	2	4	2	F
5	Tomáš Vlasák	Czech Republic	4	1	#	4	6	F

GP = Games played; G = Goals; A = Assists; Pts = Points; +/− = Plus/minus; PIM = Penalties in minutes; POS = Position
Source: swehockey

== Goaltending leaders ==
Pos	Player	Country	TOI	GA	GAA	Sv%	SO
1	Jiří Trvaj	Czech Republic	120:00	3	1.50	95.08	0
2	Yegor Podomatsky	Russia	190:01	6	1.89	93.88	0
3	Adam Svoboda	Czech Republic	120:00	4	1.96	92.86	0
4	Stefan Liv	Sweden	188:02	5	1.60	92.75	0
5	Tom Draper	Canada	125:01	7	3.36	86.79	0
6	Fredrik Norrena	Finland	169:57	10	3.53	85.92	0
7	Jamie Ram	Canada	119:39	9	4.51	84.21	0

TOI = Time on ice (minutes:seconds); SA = Shots against; GA = Goals against; GAA = Goals Against Average; Sv% = Save percentage; SO = Shutouts
Source: swehockey

== Tournament awards ==
The tournament directorate named the following players in the tournament 2001 (November):

- Best goalkeeper: (Sweden) Mikael Tellqvist
- Best defenceman: (Sweden) Fredrik Olausson
- Best forward: (Finland) Jukka Hentunen

Media All-Star Team:

- Goaltender: (Czech Republic) Dušan Salfický
- Defence: (Finland) Janne Grönvall, (Sweden) Fredrik Olausson
- Forwards: (Finland) Jukka Hentunen, (Sweden) Jörgen Jönsson, (Finland) Timo Pärssinen
