= 2014 Oddset Hockey Games =

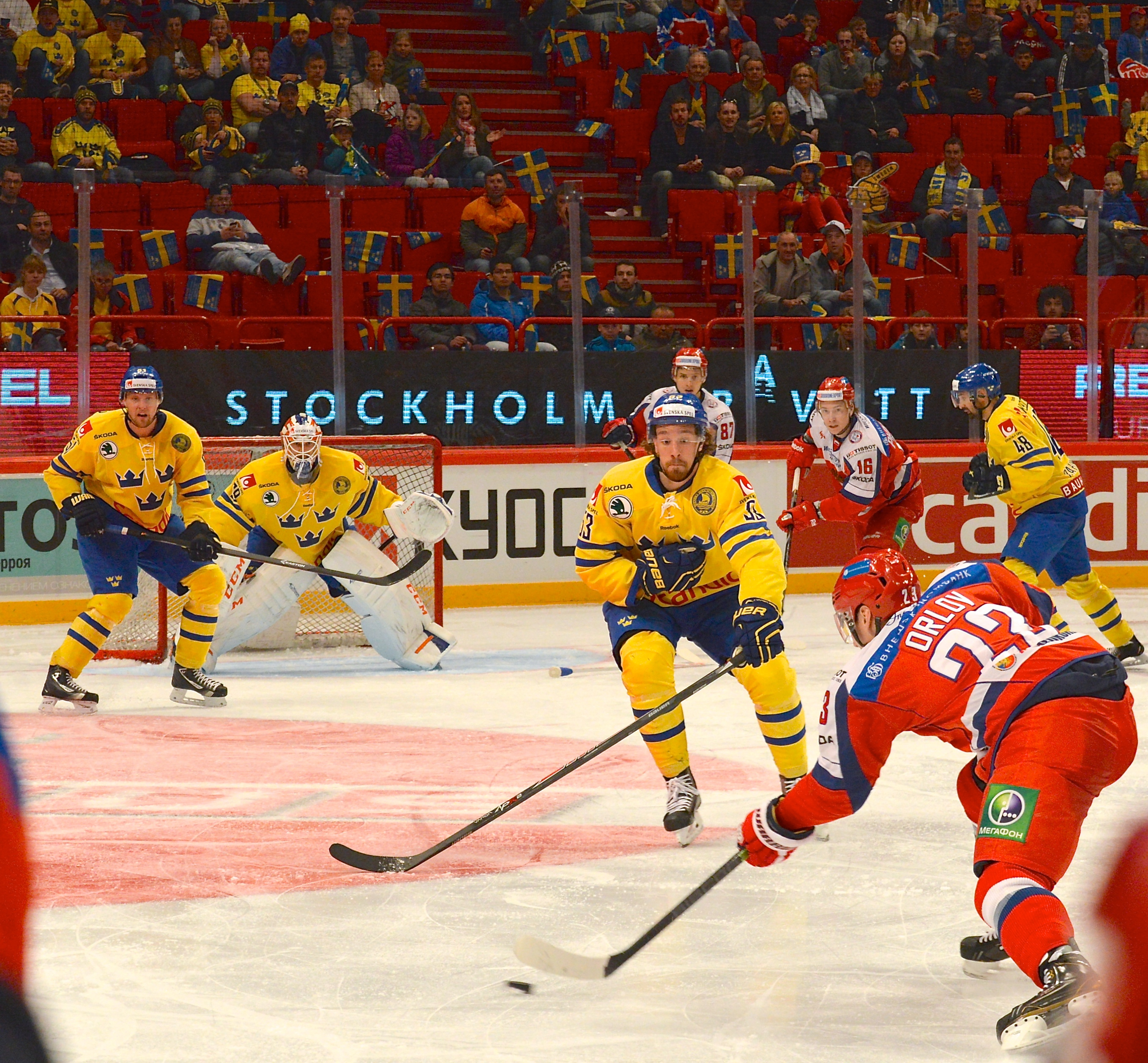

Tournament details
- Host countries: Sweden; Finland
- Cities: Stockholm; Helsinki
- Venues: 2 (in 2 host cities)
- Dates: 1–4 May 2014
- Teams: 4

Final positions
- Champions: Finland (6th title)
- Runners-up: Sweden
- Third place: Czech Republic
- Fourth place: Russia

Tournament statistics
- Games played: 6
- Goals scored: 24 (4 per game)
- Attendance: 35,477 (5,913 per game)
- Scoring leader: (Sweden) Mikael Backlund (4 points)

Awards
- MVP: (Finland) Pekka Rinne

Official website
- swehockey

The 2014 Oddset Hockey Games was played between 1 and 4 May 2014. The Czech Republic, Finland, Sweden and Russia play a round-robin for a total of three games per team and six games in total. Four of the matches are played in the Ericsson Globe in Johanneshov, Stockholm, Sweden, one match in the next-door Hovet, and one match in the Hartwall Arena in Helsinki, Finland. Finland won the tournament for the fifth time. The tournament is a part of the 2013–14 Euro Hockey Tour.

== Standings ==
Pos	Team	Pld	W	OTW	OTL	L	GF	GA	GD	Pts
1	Finland	3	1	2	0	0	7	4	+3	7
2	Czech Republic	3	1	0	1	1	4	10	−6	4
3	Sweden	3	1	0	1	1	6	6	0	4
4	Russia	3	1	0	0	2	7	4	+3	3

Source: swehockey

== Games ==
All times are local. Stockholm – (Central European Time – UTC+1) Helsinki – (Eastern European Time – UTC+2)

1 May 2014; 16:00	Finland	2–1 (1–0, 1–0, 0–1)	Russia	Hartwall Areena, Helsinki; Attendance: 11,675

Game reference

Mikko Koskinen
Goalies
Anton Khudobin
Referees:
(Czech Republic) Pavel Hodek
(Czech Republic) Vladimir Pesina
Linesmen:
(Finland) Sakari Suominen
(Finland) Masi Puolakka

L. Komarov (J. Hietanen, T. Mäntylä) (PP1) - 06:46	1–0
P. Kontiola (J. Hietanen, J. Lehterä) (PP1) - 36:02	2–0
	2-1	58:43 – N. Kulyomin (A. Ovechkin) (PP-EA)

12 min
Penalties
10 min
16
Shots
31

1 May 2014; 16:00	Czech Republic	3–2 (1–1, 1–1, 1–0)	Sweden	Hovet, Stockholm; Attendance: 5,475

Game reference

Alexander Salak
Goalies
Anders Nilsson
Referees:
(Russia) Evgeny Romasko
(Russia) Alexey Anisimov
Linesmen:
(Sweden) Jimmy Dahmén
(Sweden) Emil Wernström

T. Mojžíš (J. Jágr) – 00:15	1–0
	1–1	02:21 - (PP1) M. Backlund (J. Lindström)
M. Zaťovič (J. Krejčík, A. Salák) – 22:52	2–1
	2–2	32:14 – (PP1) M. Nygren (O. Möller, M. Backlund)
J. Petružálek (J. Kolář) – 46:02	3–2

16 min
Penalties
8 min
12
Shots
28

3 May 2014; 12:30	Sweden	2–3 GWS (0–1,1–1,1–0) (OT: 0–0) (SO: 0–1)	Finland	Ericsson Globe, Stockholm; Attendance: 8,379

Game reference

Joacim Eriksson
Goalies
Pekka Rinne
Referees:
(Russia) Evgeny Romasko
(Russia) Alexey Anisimov
Linesmen:
(Sweden) Henrik Pihlblad
(Sweden) Tobias Haster

	0–1	11:14 – P. Jormakka (L. Komarov)
O. Möller (J. Lindström, M. Nygren) (PP1) – 23:44	1–1
	1–2	38:21 – (PP1) A. Ohtamaa (P. Kontiola, J. Lehterä)
O. Möller (M. Backlund) – 56:01	2–2

O. Möller (miss)
L. Klasen (miss)
J. Lindström
J. Lindström (miss)
N. Olausson (miss)
M. Nygren (miss)
Shootout
P. Kontiola (miss)
J. Lehterä
L. Komarov (miss)
P. Jormakka (miss)
J. Lehterä (miss)
I. Pakarinen
8 min
Penalties
6 min
38
Shots
20

3 May 2014; 16:00	Russia	6–0 (4–0,1–0,1–0)	Czech Republic	Ericsson Globe, Stockholm; Attendance: 2,358

Game reference

Andrei Vasilevski
Goalies
Jakub Kovář
Referees:
(Sweden) Tobias Björk
(Sweden) Mikael Sjöqvist
Linesmen:
(Sweden) Jimmy Dahmén
(Sweden) Emil Yletyinen

V. Tikhonov (V. Schipachev, I. Nikulin) (PP1) – 05:47	1–0
S. Plotnikov (V. Schipachev, V. Tikhonov) (PP1) – 06:54	2–0
A. Loktionov (E. Kuznetsov) – 11:45	3–0
I. Zubov (E. Yakovlev) – 18:30	4–0
A. Loktionov (A. Kutuzov) – 25:45	5–0
V. Tikhonov (D. Orlov, A. Ovechkin) (PP1) – 48:52	6–0

10 min
Penalties
10 min
21
Shots
28

4 May 2014; 12:30	Finland	2–1 GWS (1–0,0–1,0–0) (OT: 0–0) (SO: 1–0)	Czech Republic	Ericsson Globe, Stockholm; Attendance: 913

Game reference
Pekka Rinne	Goalies	Alexander Salák	Referees: (Sweden) Tobias Björk (Sweden) Mikael Sjöqvist; Linesmen: (Sweden) Henrik Pihlblad, (Sweden) Tobias Haster
M. Keränen (T. Teräväinen, J. Hietanen) – 07:00 / 1–0; / 1–1 / 34:18 – M. Růžička (J. Klepiš, M. Vondrka)			Referees: (Sweden) Tobias Björk (Sweden) Mikael Sjöqvist; Linesmen: (Sweden) Henrik Pihlblad, (Sweden) Tobias Haster
J. Immonen; M. Keränen	Shootout	J. Klepiš (miss); M. Růžička (miss)	Referees: (Sweden) Tobias Björk (Sweden) Mikael Sjöqvist; Linesmen: (Sweden) Henrik Pihlblad, (Sweden) Tobias Haster
6 min	Penalties	6 min	Referees: (Sweden) Tobias Björk (Sweden) Mikael Sjöqvist; Linesmen: (Sweden) Henrik Pihlblad, (Sweden) Tobias Haster
23	Shots	26	Referees: (Sweden) Tobias Björk (Sweden) Mikael Sjöqvist; Linesmen: (Sweden) Henrik Pihlblad, (Sweden) Tobias Haster

4 May 2014; 16:00	Sweden	2–0 (1–0,0–0,1–0)	Russia	Ericsson Globe, Stockholm; Attendance: 6,677

Game reference
Anders Nilsson	Goalies	Anton Khudobin	Referees: (Finland) Antti Boman (Finland) Mikko Kaukokari; Linesmen: (Sweden) Jimmy Dahmén (Sweden) Emil Yletyinen
L. Klasen (D. Rahimi, D. Rasmussen) – 11:09 / 1–0; M. Backlund (J. Lindström) – 45:16 / 2–0			Referees: (Finland) Antti Boman (Finland) Mikko Kaukokari; Linesmen: (Sweden) Jimmy Dahmén (Sweden) Emil Yletyinen
38 min	Penalties	10 min	Referees: (Finland) Antti Boman (Finland) Mikko Kaukokari; Linesmen: (Sweden) Jimmy Dahmén (Sweden) Emil Yletyinen
19	Shots	27	Referees: (Finland) Antti Boman (Finland) Mikko Kaukokari; Linesmen: (Sweden) Jimmy Dahmén (Sweden) Emil Yletyinen

== Scoring leaders ==
Pos	Player	Country	GP	G	A	Pts	+/−	PIM	POS
1	Mikael Backlund	Sweden	3	2	2	4	+2	0	CE
2	Juuso Hietanen	Finland	3	1	3	4	+1	2	RD
3	Joakim Lindström	Sweden	3	0	4	4	+2	0	LW
4	Oscar Möller	Sweden	3	2	1	3	+2	0	RW
5	Viktor Tikhonov	Russia	3	2	1	3	+2	2	LW

GP = Games played; G = Goals; A = Assists; Pts = Points; +/− = Plus/minus; PIM = Penalties in minutes; POS = Position
Source: swehockey

== Goaltending leaders ==
Pos	Player	Country	TOI	GA	GAA	Sv%	SO
1	Pekka Rinne	Finland	130:00	3	1.38	95.31	0
2	Alexander Salák	Czech Republic	125:00	3	1.44	94.12	0
3	Joacim Eriksson	Sweden	95:15	2	1.26	93.75	0
4	Anton Khudobin	Russia	116:09	4	2.07	88.75	0
5	Anders Nilsson	Sweden	87:41	3	2.05	88.46	0

TOI = Time on ice (minutes:seconds); SA = Shots against; GA = Goals against; GAA = Goals Against Average; Sv% = Save percentage; SO = Shutouts
Source: swehockey

== Tournament awards ==
The tournament directorate named the following players in the tournament 2014:

- Best goalkeeper: (Finland) Pekka Rinne
- Best defenceman: (Finland) Juuso Hietanen
- Best forward: (Sweden) Oscar Möller
- MVP: (Finland) Pekka Rinne

Media All-Star Team:

- Goaltender: (Finland) Pekka Rinne
- Defence: (Russia) Anton Belov, (Finland) Juuso Hietanen
- Forwards: (Finland) Petri Kontiola, (Sweden) Oscar Möller, (Russia) Viktor Tikhonov
