= 2017 Sweden Hockey Games =

International ice hockey competition

2017 Sweden Hockey Games (Euro Hockey Tour)
Tournament details
- Host countries: Sweden; Russia
- Cities: Gothenburg; Saint Petersburg
- Venues: 2 (in 2 host cities)
- Dates: 9–12 February 2017
- Teams: 4

Final positions
- Champions: Russia (4th title)
- Runners-up: Sweden
- Third place: Czech Republic
- Fourth place: Finland

Tournament statistics
- Games played: 6
- Goals scored: 35 (5.83 per game)
- Attendance: 35,102 (5,850 per game)
- Scoring leader: (Sweden) Carl Klingberg (6 points)

Official website
- swehockey

The 2017 Sweden Hockey Games was played between 9 and 12 February 2017. The Czech Republic, Finland, Sweden and Russia played a round-robin for a total of three games per team and six games in total. Five of the matches were played in Gothenburg, Sweden, and one match in Saint Petersburg, Russia. The tournament was part of 2016–17 Euro Hockey Tour. Tournament was won by Russia.

== Standings ==
| Pos | Team | Pld | W | OTW | OTL | L | GF | GA | GD | Pts |
|---|---|---|---|---|---|---|---|---|---|---|
| 1 | Russia | 3 | 3 | 0 | 0 | 0 | 10 | 5 | +5 | 9 |
| 2 | Sweden | 3 | 1 | 0 | 0 | 2 | 9 | 9 | 0 | 3 |
| 3 | Czech Republic | 3 | 1 | 0 | 0 | 2 | 11 | 10 | +1 | 3 |
| 4 | Finland | 3 | 1 | 0 | 0 | 2 | 5 | 11 | −6 | 3 |

Source: swehockey

== Games ==
All times are local. Gothenburg – (Central European Time – UTC+1) St Petersburg – (Moscow Time - UTC+3)

| 9 February 2017; 19:15 | Czech Republic | 2–5 (0–3, 1–0, 1–2) | Sweden | Scandinavium, Gothenburg; Attendance: 6,152 |

Game reference

~~Jakub Kovář~~
Pavel Francouz
Goalies
Viktor Fasth
Referees:
(Finland) Anssi Salonen
(Finland) Lassi Heikkinen
Linesmen:
(Sweden) Henrik Pihlblad
(Norway) Alexander Waldejer

| | 0–1 | 04:54 – Everberg (JEriksson Ek, Klingberg) |
| | 0–2 | 09:17 – Eriksson Ek (Klingberg) |
| | 0–3 | 14:21 – Klingberg (Zackrisson, Johansson) (PP1) |
| Kovář (Zohorna, Polášek) – 25:04 | 1–3 |
| | 1–4 | 52:09 – Klingberg |
| Kovář (Polášek, Kundrátek) (PP1) – 57:40 | 2–4 |
| | 2–5 | 59:59 – Rosén (Klingberg) (ENG) |

8 min
Penalties
8 min
19
Shots
22

| 9 February 2017; 19:30 | Russia | 2–1 (0–0, 1–0, 1–1) | Finland | Yubileyny Sports Palace, Saint Petersburg; Attendance: 6,778 |

Game reference

Igor Shestyorkin
Goalies
Mikko Koskinen
Referees:
(Czech Republic) Pavel Hodek
(Czech Republic) René Hradil
Linesmen:
(Russia) Yuri Ivanov
(Russia) Alexander Nesterov

| Kruchinin (Svetlakov, Rykov) – 35:08 | 1–0 |
| | 1–1 | 40:37 – Palola (Sallinen, Haapala) |
| Golyshev (Tkachev, Arzamatsev) – 58:34 | 2–1 |

8 min
Penalties
12 min
21
Shots
24

| 11 February 2017; 12:00 | Finland | 1–7 (0–2, 0–2, 1–3) | Czech Republic | Scandinavium, Gothenburg; Attendance: 1,468 |

Game reference

Juha Metsola
Goalies
Pavel Francouz
Referees:
(Sweden) Linus Öhlund
(Sweden) Andreas Harnebring
Linesmen:
(Sweden) Ludvig Lundgren
(Sweden) Andreas Malmqvist

| | 0–1 | 12:11 – Radil (Kämpf, Kovář |
| | 0–2 | 14:25 – Vondrka (Radil, Polášek) |
| | 0–3 | 21:45 – Birner (Holík) |
| | 0–4 | 38:11 – Kašpar (Zohorna) (SH1) |
| Erkinjuntti (Savinainen, Lehtonen) (PP2) – 45:40 | 1–4 |
| | 1–5 | 48:47 – Řepík (Holík, Rutta) (PP1) |
| | 1–6 | 57:20 – Holík (Řepík, Birner) (PP1) |
| | 1–7 | 59:10 – Radil (Kovář) |

4 min
Penalties
10 min
22
Shots
33

| 11 February 2017; 15:30 | Sweden | 2–4 (1–2, 1–1, 0–1) | Russia | Scandinavium, Gothenburg; Attendance: 10,347 |

Game reference

Anders Lindbäck
Goalies
Ilya Sorokin
Referees:
(Finland) Anssi Salonen
(Finland) Lassi Heikkinen
Linesmen:
(Sweden) Daniel Persson
(Norway) Alexander Waldejer

| | 0–1 | 14:18 – Kaprizov (Golyshev) (PP1) |
| Fantenberg (Bergström, Gynge) (PP1) – 16:20 | 1–1 |
| | 1–2 | 16:27 – Karpov (Musin, Rykov) |
| Bergström (Fantenberg, Klingberg) (PP1) – 39:00 | 2–2 |
| | 2–3 | 39:38 – Kaprizov (Golyshev) |
| | 2–4 | 47:56 – Kaprizov (Tkachyov, Bereglazov) (PP2) |

35 min
Penalties
16 min
45
Shots
22

| 12 February 2017; 12:00 | Russia | 4–2 (1–0, 1–2, 2–0) | Czech Republic | Scandinavium, Gothenburg; Attendance: 1,234 |

Game reference

Ilya Samsonov
Goalies
Pavel Francouz
Referees:
(Sweden) Linus Öhlund
(Sweden) Andreas Harnebring
Linesmen:
(Sweden) Daniel Persson
(Sweden) Ludvig Lundgren

| Shumakov (Shalunov) (PP1) – 11:40 | 1–0 |
| | 1–1 | 21:31 – Lenc (Jelínek) |
| | 1–2 | 31:25 – Radil (Polášek) |
| Golyshev (Tkachyov, Kaprizov) – 35:29 | 2–2 |
| Shalunov (Shumakov) (PP1) – 46:23 | 3–2 |
| Shalunov (Shumakov) – 54:14 | 4–2 |

8 min
Penalties
8 min
18
Shots
29

| 12 February 2017; 15:30 | Sweden | 2–3 (1–0, 0–2, 1–1) | Finland | Scandinavium, Gothenburg; Attendance: 9,123 |

Game reference

Viktor Fasth
Goalies
Mikko Koskinen
Referees:
(Russia) Sergey Morozov
(Russia) Pavel Ovhinnikov
Linesmen:
(Sweden) Andreas Malmqvist
(Sweden) Henrik Pihlblad

| Ryno (Tömmernes, JEriksson Ek) (PP1) – 08:04 | 1–0 |
| | 1–1 | 24:33 – Savinainen (Erkinjuntti, Koivisto) |
| | 1–2 | 33:49 – Kärki (Nättinen) |
| | 1–3 | 49:24 – Savinainen (Manninen) |
| Holm (Gynge, Händemark) – 50:53 | 2–3 |

16 min
Penalties
18 min
36
Shots
20

== Scoring leaders ==
| Pos | Player | Country | GP | G | A | Pts | +/− | PIM | POS |
|---|---|---|---|---|---|---|---|---|---|
| 1 | Carl Klingberg | Sweden | 3 | 2 | 4 | 6 | +4 | 2 | LW |
| 2 | Lukáš Radil | Czech Republic | 3 | 3 | 1 | 4 | +4 | 0 | RW |
| 3 | Kirill Kaprizov | Russia | 3 | 3 | 1 | 4 | +3 | 0 | LW |
| 4 | Anatolii Golyshev | Russia | 3 | 2 | 2 | 4 | +3 | 0 | CE |
| 5 | Jan Kovář | Czech Republic | 3 | 2 | 2 | 4 | +4 | 2 | LW |

GP = Games played; G = Goals; A = Assists; Pts = Points; +/− = Plus/minus; PIM = Penalties in minutes; POS = Position
Source: swehockey

== Goaltending leaders ==
| Pos | Player | Country | TOI | GA | GAA | Sv% | SO |
|---|---|---|---|---|---|---|---|
| 1 | Mikko Koskinen | Finland | 118:39 | 4 | 2.02 | 92.98 | 0 |
| 2 | Pavel Francouz | Czech Republic | 158:58 | 6 | 2.26 | 88.24 | 0 |
| 3 | Viktor Fasth | Sweden | 133:48 | 5 | 2.51 | 87.18 | 0 |

TOI = Time on ice (minutes:seconds); SA = Shots against; GA = Goals against; GAA = Goals Against Average; Sv% = Save percentage; SO = Shutouts
Source: swehockey
