= 1991 Sweden Hockey Games =

Ice hockey competition in Stockholm

Tournament details
- Host country: Sweden
- City: Stockholm
- Venue: 1 (in 1 host city)
- Dates: 7 – 10 February 1991
- Teams: 4

Final positions
- Champions: Soviet Union (1st title)
- Runners-up: Sweden
- Third place: Finland
- Fourth place: Czechoslovakia

Tournament statistics
- Games played: 6
- Goals scored: 47 (7.83 per game)
- Attendance: 39,420 (6,570 per game)
- Scoring leader: (Soviet Union) Valeri Kamensky (7 points)

The 1991 Sweden Hockey Games was played between 7 and 10 February 1991 in Stockholm, Sweden. The Czech Republic, Sweden, Soviet Union and Finland played a round-robin for a total of three games per team and six games in total. All of the games were played in the Globen in Stockholm, Sweden. The tournament was won by the Soviet Union.

== Standings ==
Pos	Team	Pld	W	D	L	GF	GA	GD	Pts
1	Soviet Union	3	2	1	0	17	12	+5	7
2	Sweden	3	2	0	1	10	9	+1	6
3	Finland	3	1	0	2	14	13	+1	3
4	Czechoslovakia	3	0	1	2	6	13	−7	1

Source: swehockey

== Games ==
All times are local. Stockholm – (Central European Time – UTC+1)

7 februari 1991	Finland	6-9 (2–3, 3–2, 1–4)	Soviet Union	Globen, Stockholm; Attendance: 1,158

7 februari 1991	Sweden	4-2 (1–1, 2–1, 1–0)	Czechoslovakia	Globen, Stockholm; Attendance: 6,453

8 februari 1991	Finland	1-2 (0–0, 1–0, 0–2)	Sweden	Globen, Stockholm; Attendance: 11,381

8 februari 1991	Soviet Union	2-2 (0–1, 1–1, 1–0)	Czechoslovakia	Globen, Stockholm; Attendance: 2,380

10 februari 1991	Czechoslovakia	2-7 (2–1, 0–4, 0–2)	Finland	Globen, Stockholm; Attendance: 4,198

10 februari 1991	Sweden	4-6 (1–2, 1–2, 2–2)	Soviet Union	Globen, Stockholm; Attendance: 13,850

== Scoring leaders ==
Pos	Player	Country	GP	G	A	Pts	PIM	POS
1	Valeri Kamensky	Soviet Union	3	4	3	7	2	F
2	Pavel Bure	Soviet Union	3	1	5	6	0	F
3	Hannu Virta	Finland	3	3	1	4	6	D
4	Pekka Tuomisto	Finland	3	3	0	3	0	F
5	Viktor Gordiuk	Soviet Union	3	2	1	3	0	F

GP = Games played; G = Goals; A = Assists; Pts = Points; +/− = Plus/minus; PIM = Penalties in minutes; POS = Position
Source: quanthockey
