= Tomas Forslund =

Swedish ice hockey player

- Born: 24 November 1968 (age 57) Falun, Sweden
- Height: 5 ft 11 in (180 cm)
- Weight: 200 lb (91 kg; 14 st 4 lb)
- Position: Right wing
- Shot: Left
- Played for: Calgary Flames; Leksands IF; Kölner Haie
- NHL draft: 85th overall, 1988; Calgary Flames
- Playing career: 1985–2003

Kjell Tomas Forslund (born 24 November 1968) is a Swedish former professional ice hockey right wing. Forslund began his hockey career with Leksands IF in his native Sweden. He was drafted 85th overall by the Calgary Flames in the 1988 NHL entry draft and after three more seasons in Sweden, he signed for the Flames in 1991. He split his time with the Flames and the Salt Lake Golden Eagles of the International Hockey League (IHL) during his first year, in which he played 38 games for Calgary, scoring 5 goals and 9 assists for 14 points. In his second year, however, he played just 6 more games for the Flames, scoring 2 assists as he spent much of the season in Salt Lake. Forslund returned to Leksands in 1993 and then moved to Germany to play for Deutsche Eishockey Liga club Kölner Haie where he spent five seasons. He then went back to Leksands and played one more season before retiring.

== Career statistics ==
=== Regular season and playoffs ===
			Regular season					Playoffs
Season	Team	League	GP	G	A	Pts	PIM	GP	G	A	Pts	PIM
1984–85	HC Dobel	SWE.2	5	2	1	3	6	—	—	—	—	—
1985–86	HC Dobel	SWE.3	32	17	20	37	—	—	—	—	—	—
1986–87	Leksands IF	SEL	23	3	5	8	4	—	—	—	—	—
1987–88	Leksands IF	SEL	36	9	10	19	22	3	1	1	2	2
1988–89	Leksands IF	SEL	39	14	16	30	58	10	2	4	6	6
1989–90	Leksands IF	SEL	38	14	21	35	48	3	0	1	1	2
1990–91	Leksands IF	SEL	22	5	10	15	10	—	—	—	—	—
1991–92	Calgary Flames	NHL	38	5	9	14	12	—	—	—	—	—
1991–92	Salt Lake Golden Eagles	IHL	22	10	6	16	25	5	2	2	4	2
1992–93	Calgary Flames	NHL	6	0	2	2	0	—	—	—	—	—
1992–93	Salt Lake Golden Eagles	IHL	63	31	23	54	68	—	—	—	—	—
1993–94	Leksands IF	SEL	38	16	17	33	66	—	—	—	—	—
1994–95	Leksands IF	SEL	34	24	10	34	46	3	1	0	1	25
1995–96	Leksands IF	SEL	35	13	13	26	65	5	1	2	3	4
1996–97	Kölner Haie	DEL	48	16	22	38	42	4	0	1	1	2
1997–98	Kölner Haie	DEL	46	15	29	44	66	3	2	1	3	2
1998–99	Kölner Haie	DEL	51	19	34	53	44	5	3	3	6	8
1999–2000	Kölner Haie	DEL	51	14	24	38	49	9	2	1	3	4
2000–01	Kölner Haie	DEL	56	13	20	33	48	3	1	0	1	4
2002–03	Leksands IF	SEL	47	5	2	7	85	5	1	0	1	2
2003–04	Borlänge HF	SWE.3	9	3	4	7	35	—	—	—	—	—
SEL totals			311	103	103	206	412	33	7	9	16	45
DEL totals			250	75	128	203	247	24	8	6	14	20

=== International ===
Year	Team	Event	GP	G	A	Pts	PIM
1986	Sweden	EJC	5	0	1	1	2
1988	Sweden	WJC	7	0	0	0	10
1991	Sweden	CC	6	1	0	1	2
1994	Sweden	WC	5	2	2	4	4
1995	Sweden	WC	8	2	0	2	10
1996	Sweden	WC	6	0	1	1	2
Junior totals			12	0	1	1	12
Senior totals			25	5	3	8	18
