= Richard Žemlička =

Czech ice hockey player

- Born: 13 April 1964 (age 62) Prague, Czechoslovakia
- Height: 6 ft 1 in (185 cm)
- Weight: 201 lb (91 kg; 14 st 5 lb)
- Position: Left wing
- Shot: Left
- Played for: HC Sparta Praha; TPS; EHC Freiburg; Eisbären Berlin; ESG Sachsen Weißwasser; HC Litvínov; HK Poprad; MHK 32 Liptovský Mikuláš
- National team: Czechoslovakia and Czech Republic
- NHL draft: 185th overall, 1990; Edmonton Oilers
- Playing career: 1985–2010
Medal record
Men's ice hockey
Representing Czechoslovakia
Olympic Games
Bronze medal – third place	1992 Albertville	Team competition

Richard Žemlička (born 13 April 1964) is a Czech former professional ice hockey left winger.

== Playing career ==
Žemlicka began his career with HC Slavia Praha and HC Sparta Praha, becoming a regular member of Sparta's roster in 1987. He was drafted 185th in the 1990 NHL entry draft by the Edmonton Oilers but never made the move to North America and remained with Sparta Praha before moving to the SM-liiga in Finland for TPS during the 1991-92 season. He then moved to Germany in 1992 to play in the Eishockey-Bundesliga and later the Deutsche Eishockey Liga for EHC Freiburg, Eisbären Berlin and ESG Sachsen Weißwasser before returning to Sparta Praha in 1995.

Žemlicka stayed with Sparta for the next eight seasons, becoming the team's captain in 2001. In 2003, he joined HC Litvínov and in 2004, he moved to the Slovak Extraliga for spells with HK Poprad and MHK 32 Liptovský Mikuláš. From 2006 until his retirement in 2010, Žemlicka played for HC Roudnice nad Labem.

Žemlicka was a member of the Czechoslovakia national team and later the Czech Republic national team following the split of Czechoslovakia in 1993. He played at the 1992 Winter Olympics and helped Czechoslovakia win the bronze medal. He also played in the 1994 Winter Olympics for the Czech Republic.

== Career statistics ==
=== Regular season and playoffs ===
			Regular season					Playoffs
Season	Team	League	GP	G	A	Pts	PIM	GP	G	A	Pts	PIM
1985–86	TJ Slavia IPS Praha	TCH II	41	21	10	31	—	—	—	—	—	—
1986–87	TJ Sparta ČKD Praha	TCH	27	3	7	10	14	—	—	—	—	—
1986–87	TJ Slavia IPS Praha	TCH II	—	12	—	—	—	—	—	—	—	—
1987–88	TJ Sparta ČKD Praha	TCH	44	8	10	18	32	—	—	—	—	—
1988–89	TJ Sparta ČKD Praha	TCH	42	20	17	37	40	—	—	—	—	—
1989–90	TJ Sparta ČKD Praha	TCH	45	15	14	29	28	—	—	—	—	—
1990–91	HC Sparta Praha	TCH	51	22	30	52	43	—	—	—	—	—
1991–92	HC Sparta Praha	TCH	28	14	19	33	33	—	—	—	—	—
1991–92	TPS	Liiga	15	5	9	14	6	3	2	1	3	0
1992–93	EHC Freiburg	1.GBun	43	25	31	56	52	—	—	—	—	—
1993–94	EHC Freiburg	1.GBun	44	15	33	48	31	—	—	—	—	—
1993–94	HC Sparta Praha	ELH	—	—	—	—	—	7	0	3	3	16
1994–95	Eisbären Berlin	DEL	38	23	24	47	32	—	—	—	—	—
1995–96	ESG Füchse Sachsen	DEL	2	0	2	2	2	—	—	—	—	—
1995–96	HC Sparta Praha	ELH	29	20	20	40	46	11	1	11	12	29
1996–97	HC Sparta Praha	ELH	40	24	22	46	78	8	5	5	10	20
1997–98	HC Sparta Praha	ELH	43	16	21	37	52	11	2	6	8	49
1998–99	HC Sparta Praha	ELH	27	12	11	23	61	8	1	3	4	4
1999–2000	HC Sparta Praha	ELH	43	17	25	42	68	9	5	4	9	12
2000–01	HC Sparta Praha	ELH	47	14	29	43	105	13	5	8	13	18
2001–02	HC Sparta Praha	ELH	46	19	24	43	92	11	1	9	10	12
2002–03	HC Sparta Praha	ELH	35	8	12	20	30	—	—	—	—	—
2002–03	HC Chemopetrol, a.s.	ELH	11	2	8	10	24	—	—	—	—	—
2003–04	HC Chemopetrol, a.s.	ELH	46	8	16	24	48	—	—	—	—	—
2004–05	HK Tatravagónka ŠKP Poprad	SVK	37	12	14	26	26	5	1	2	3	18
2005–06	HK Tatravagónka ŠKP Poprad	SVK	29	5	4	9	40	—	—	—	—	—
2005–06	HK 32 Liptovský Mikuláš	SVK	21	2	9	11	75	—	—	—	—	—
2006–07	HC Roudnice nad Labem	CZE IV	—	—	—	—	—	—	—	—	—	—
2007–08	HC Roudnice nad Labem	CZE III	30	17	16	33	93	—	—	—	—	—
2008–09	HC Roudnice nad Labem	CZE III	31	16	23	39	42	—	—	—	—	—
2009–10	HC Roudnice nad Labem	CZE III	7	1	5	6	6	—	—	—	—	—
TCH totals			237	86	93	179	190	—	—	—	—	—
ELH totals			367	134	170	304	604	84	20	49	69	160

=== International ===
Year	Team	Event	GP	G	A	Pts	PIM
1991	Czechoslovakia	WC	10	2	1	3	4
1991	Czechoslovakia	CC	5	2	1	3	0
1992	Czechoslovakia	OG	8	1	4	5	6
1992	Czechoslovakia	WC	8	0	3	3	0
1993	Czech Republic	WC	5	1	1	2	8
1994	Czech Republic	OG	8	3	4	7	6
1994	Czech Republic	WC	6	3	1	4	6
1995	Czech Republic	WC	8	1	1	2	6
1997	Czech Republic	WC	9	0	2	2	4
Senior totals			67	13	18	31	40
