= Sweden Hockey Games =

Annual ice hockey tournament in Sweden

Beijer Hockey Games
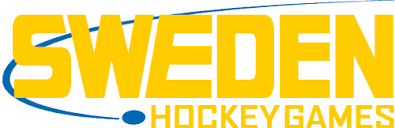

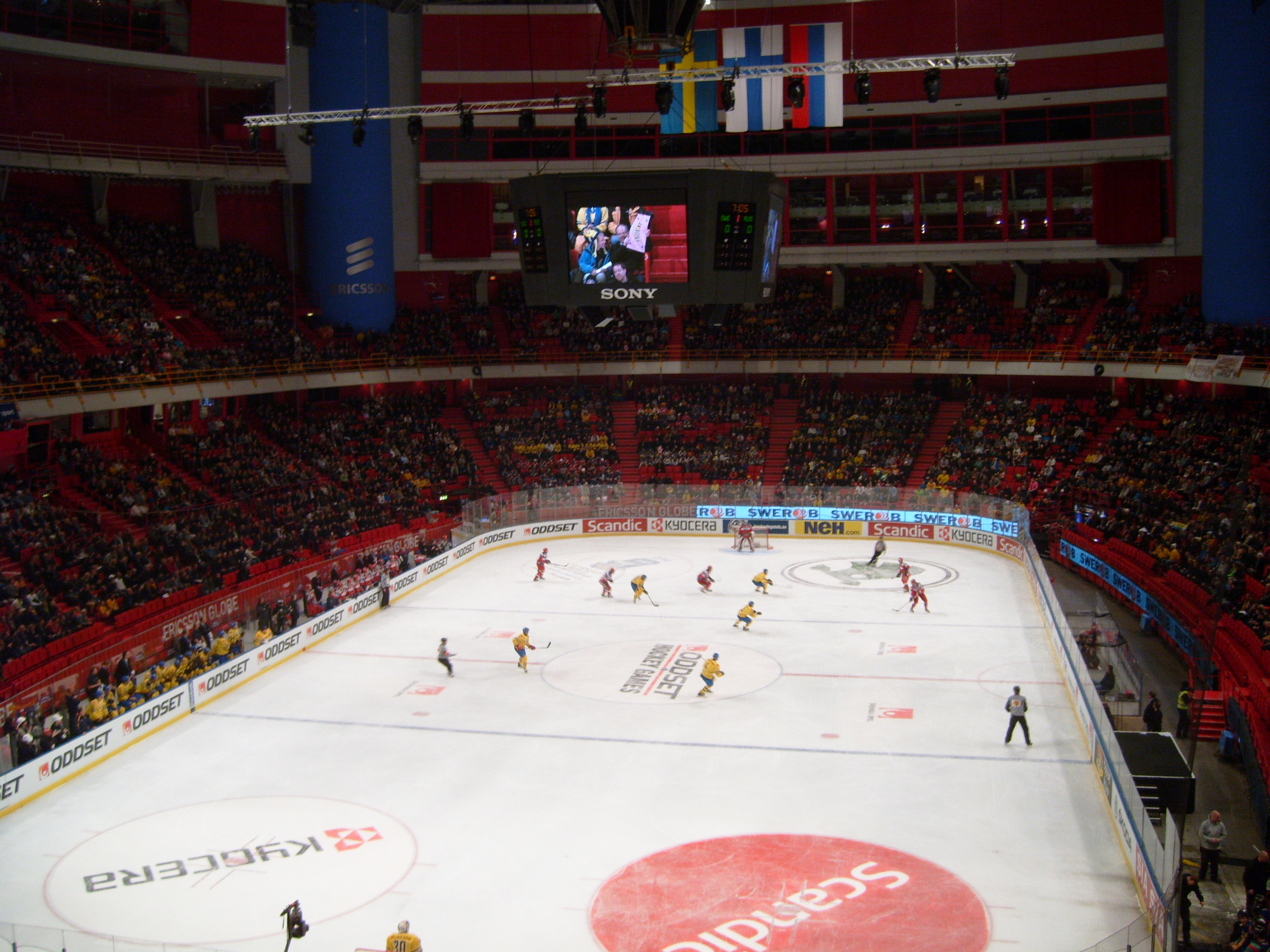
- Sweden-Russia during the 2012 tournament
- Genre: Sporting Event
- Date: February
- Frequency: annual
- Location: Stockholm
- Country: Sweden
- Inaugurated: 1991

The Beijer Hockey Games (BHG, formerly known as Sweden Hockey Games) is an annual ice hockey tournament held in Sweden as part of the Euro Hockey Tour. It was cancelled after the 2013–14 season. However, on 19 January 2016, the Swedish Ice Hockey Association announced the tournament would be restarted for the 2016–17 season. The tournament was also known as the LG Hockey Games between 2006 and 2011, and the Oddset Hockey Games between 2012 and 2014, while under sponsorship naming rights.

== History ==
The Beijer Hockey Games started in 1991 (as Sweden Hockey Games). Since the 1996–97 season, the tournament is part of the Euro Hockey Tour, in which the Czech Republic, Finland, Russia and Sweden participate.

The tournament first operated under a sponsored name in 2006 when LG Electronics changed the name to the LG Hockey Games. In 2012, LG dropped out of their sponsoring and Svenska Spel's gambling game Oddset took over, changing the tournament's name to the Oddset Hockey Games. The Oddset sponsorship ended when the tournament was cancelled following the 2014 Oddset Hockey Games. During the 2017 and 2018 tournament the original name was used (Sweden Hockey Games). In 2018 the company Beijer Byggmaterial, Sweden's largest wholly owned DIY store chain, claimed the sponsorship, changing the name to Beijer Hockey Games. In December 2020, the agreement was extended for another three years until 2023. In December 2024, the agreement was once again extended for 3 more years until 2027.

The event is mainly held in the Ericsson Globe in Stockholm, Sweden, although a few games may exclusively be hosted in other countries. The winner of the tournament receives the Globen Cup, leading to the tournament sometimes being called the Sweden Globen Cup. Typically, only the Czech Republic, Finland, Russia, and Sweden are invited to the tournament, but from the 1991–92 season through the 2002–03 season Canada also participated.

In 2022, Switzerland replaced Russia due to the Russian invasion of Ukraine.

== Results ==
Final standings in each event are determined in a round-robin tournament. If teams are tied in points, the standing is determined by the result of the game between the tied teams.

Year	Winner	Runner-up	3rd place	4th place	5th place
1991	Soviet Union	Sweden	Finland	Czechoslovakia	—
1992	Canada	CIS (Note: CIS is a team of Commonwealth of Independent States from the former Soviet Union.)	Czechoslovakia	Sweden	—
1993	Sweden	Czech Republic	Russia	Canada	—
1994	Czech Republic	Sweden	Canada	Russia	—
1995	Sweden	Russia	Czech Republic	Canada	—
1996	Sweden	Czech Republic	Russia	Canada	—
Part of the Euro Hockey Tour
1997	Finland	Sweden	Russia	Canada	Czech Republic
1998	Sweden	Czech Republic	Finland	Russia	Canada
1999	Finland	Sweden	Canada	Czech Republic	Russia
2000	Finland	Czech Republic	Canada	Russia	Sweden
2001 (February)	Sweden	Finland	Canada	Czech Republic	Russia
2001 (November)	Sweden	Czech Republic	Finland	Russia	Canada
2003	Russia	Sweden	Canada	Finland	Czech Republic
2004	Sweden	Czech Republic	Russia	Finland	—
2005	Sweden	Czech Republic	Russia	Finland	—
2006	Russia	Finland	Sweden	Czech Republic	—
2007	Sweden	Russia	Czech Republic	Finland	—
2008	Russia	Finland	Sweden	Czech Republic	—
2009	Sweden	Russia	Finland	Czech Republic	—
2010	Finland	Czech Republic	Russia	Sweden	—
2011	Sweden	Russia	Finland	Czech Republic	—
2012	Sweden	Czech Republic	Russia	Finland	—
2013	Finland	Czech Republic	Russia	Sweden	—
2014	Finland	Czech Republic	Sweden	Russia	—
2015–2016	No tournament held				
2017	Russia	Czech Republic	Sweden	Finland	—
2018	Finland	Sweden	Russia	Czech Republic	—
2019	Czech Republic	Russia	Sweden	Finland	—
2020	Sweden	Czech Republic	Finland	Russia	—
2021	Russia	Sweden	Finland	Czech Republic	—
2022	Czech Republic	Sweden	Switzerland	Finland	—
2023	Sweden	Finland	Czech Republic	Switzerland	—
2024	Finland	Sweden	Czech Republic	Switzerland	—
2025	Finland	Czech Republic	Switzerland	Sweden	—
2026	Finland	Switzerland	Czech Republic	Sweden	—
2027	TBD	TBD	TBD	TBD	—

== Medal table ==
Pos	Team	Gold	Silver	Bronze	Total
1	Sweden	14	9	5	27
2	Finland	10	4	7	21
3	Soviet Union; CIS; Russia	6	6	9	21
4	Czechoslovakia; Czech Republic	3	14	6	23
5	Canada	1	0	5	6
6	Switzerland	0	1	2	3
