= Kenneth Kennholt =

Swedish former ice hockey defenceman (born 1965)

- Born: 13 January 1965 (age 61) Södertälje, Sweden
- Height: 6 ft 3 in (191 cm)
- Weight: 201 lb (91 kg; 14 st 5 lb)
- Position: Defence
- Shot: Right
- Played for: Djurgårdens IF; HV71; Nacka HK
- National team: Sweden
- NHL draft: 252nd overall, 1989; Calgary Flames
- Playing career: 1984–1998

Kenneth Hans Kennholt (born 13 January 1965) is a Swedish former ice hockey defenceman. Kennholt mainly played for Djurgårdens IF and HV71 in the Swedish Elite League. He won four Swedish Championships during his career, three with Djurgården and one with HV71. Kennholt was drafted in 12th round, 252nd overall, by the Calgary Flames in the 1989 NHL entry draft.

== Career statistics ==
=== Regular season and playoffs ===
			Regular season					Playoffs
Season	Team	League	GP	G	A	Pts	PIM	GP	G	A	Pts	PIM
1982–83	SPAIF	SWE.3	20	7	1	8		—	—	—	—	—
1984–85	SPAIF	SWE.2	31	14	11	25	56	—	—	—	—	—
1985–86	Nacka HK	SWE.2	32	10	5	15	52	—	—	—	—	—
1986–87	Nacka HK	SWE.2	25	9	10	19	18	—	—	—	—	—
1987–88	Nacka HK	SWE.2	31	11	11	22	38	3	1	0	1	4
1988–89	Djurgårdens IF	SEL	34	6	10	16	30	8	0	1	1	6
1989–90	Djurgårdens IF	SEL	38	7	10	17	30	7	2	2	4	2
1990–91	Djurgårdens IF	SEL	39	9	13	22	30	7	2	0	2	4
1991–92	Djurgårdens IF	SEL	33	4	6	10	22	10	2	4	6	10
1992–93	Djurgårdens IF	SEL	35	4	8	12	24	6	4	3	7	6
1993–94	HV71	SEL	20	4	2	6	6	—	—	—	—	—
1994–95	HV71	SEL	37	9	14	23	64	13	2	5	7	6
1995–96	HV71	SEL	39	8	13	21	38	4	0	0	0	0
1996–97	HV71	SEL	48	12	20	32	40	4	0	0	0	4
1997–98	Djurgårdens IF	SEL	40	4	6	10	57	7	0	1	1	8
SEL totals			363	67	102	169	341	66	12	16	28	46

=== International ===
Year	Team	Event	GP	G	A	Pts	PIM
1991	Sweden	WC	10	2	3	5	12
1992	Sweden	OG	8	0	1	1	2
1992	Sweden	WC	8	1	2	3	10
1993	Sweden	WC	8	0	4	4	8
Senior totals			34	3	10	13	32
