= Niklas Eriksson =

Swedish ice hockey player

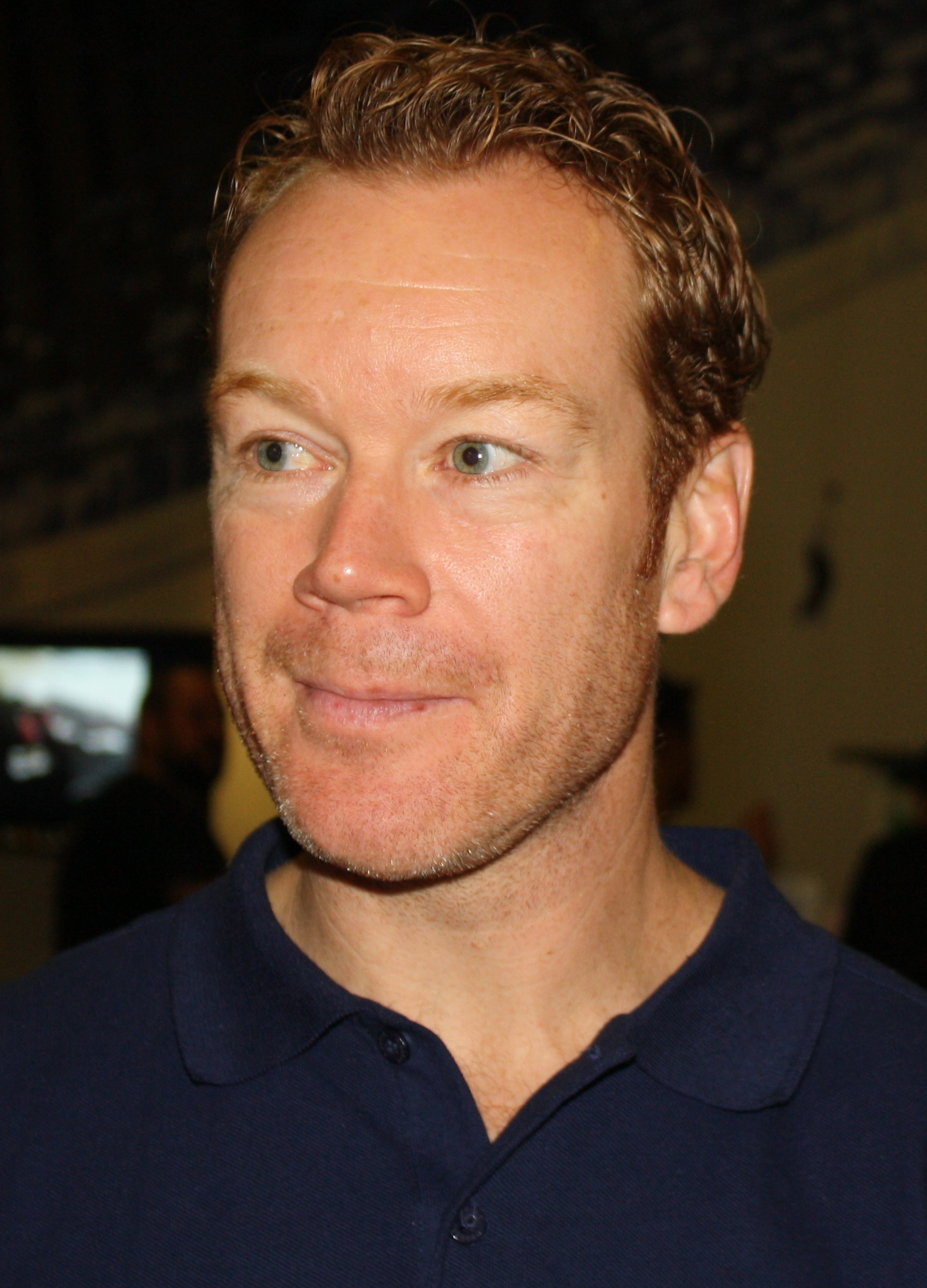
- Born: 17 February 1969 (age 57) Västervik, Sweden
- Height: 5 ft 10 in (178 cm)
- Weight: 194 lb (88 kg; 13 st 12 lb)
- Position: Right wing
- Shot: Left
- Played for: Leksands IF; HIFK; HC Pustertal Wölfe
- National team: Sweden
- NHL draft: 117th overall, 1989; Philadelphia Flyers
- Playing career: 1987–2007

Olympic medal record

Men's Ice hockey
| Gold medal – first place | 1994 Lillehammer | Ice hockey |

Niklas Urban Eriksson (born 17 February 1969) is a Swedish ice hockey coach and former professional ice hockey player. He won a gold medal at the 1994 Winter Olympics. Eriksson played most of his years in Leksands IF, and has also represented IFK Helsingfors (Finland) and HC Pustertal Wölfe (Italy). With 721 games for Leksands IF Eriksson is the player with most games for the club, and as of 2019 Eriksson is one of the honored players with jersey number 16 up in the ceiling of Tegera Arena.

After ending his career as a player in 2008 Eriksson continued as a coach. After coaching Leksands IF Eriksson has coached Lillehammer IK (Norway) and Almtuna IS. He is since 2018 Head Coach for Örebro HK.

== Career statistics ==
=== Regular season and playoffs ===
| | | | Regular season | | | | | Playoffs |
| Season | Team | League | GP | G | A | Pts | PIM | GP | G | A | Pts | PIM |
|---|---|---|---|---|---|---|---|---|---|---|---|---|
| 1987–88 | Leksands IF | SEL | 16 | 1 | 8 | 9 | 4 | 2 | 0 | 0 | 0 | 0 |
| 1988–89 | Leksands IF | SEL | 33 | 18 | 12 | 30 | 20 | 10 | 1 | 4 | 5 | 8 |
| 1989–90 | Leksands IF | SEL | 40 | 18 | 16 | 34 | 16 | 3 | 0 | 2 | 2 | 2 |
| 1990–91 | Leksands IF | SEL | 8 | 2 | 2 | 4 | 2 | — | — | — | — | — |
| 1990–91 | Leksands IF | Allsv | 18 | 5 | 4 | 9 | 12 | 4 | 0 | 2 | 2 | 4 |
| 1991–92 | Leksands IF | SEL | 22 | 10 | 7 | 17 | 16 | — | — | — | — | — |
| 1991–92 | Leksands IF | Allsv | 18 | 5 | 13 | 18 | 22 | 11 | 3 | 5 | 8 | 4 |
| 1992–93 | Leksands IF | SEL | 37 | 6 | 19 | 25 | 32 | 2 | 0 | 1 | 1 | 2 |
| 1993–94 | Leksands IF | SEL | 33 | 10 | 25 | 35 | 34 | 4 | 1 | 2 | 3 | 2 |
| 1994–95 | Leksands IF | SEL | 39 | 17 | 26 | 43 | 32 | 4 | 1 | 2 | 3 | 4 |
| 1995–96 | Leksands IF | SEL | 34 | 7 | 17 | 24 | 24 | 5 | 0 | 0 | 0 | 8 |
| 1996–97 | HIFK | Liiga | 48 | 8 | 11 | 19 | 37 | — | — | — | — | — |
| 1997–98 | Leksands IF | SEL | 41 | 10 | 16 | 26 | 75 | 4 | 1 | 1 | 2 | 4 |
| 1998–99 | Leksands IF | SEL | 49 | 9 | 9 | 18 | 30 | 4 | 0 | 1 | 1 | 6 |
| 1999–2000 | Leksands IF | SEL | 44 | 11 | 17 | 28 | 61 | — | — | — | — | — |
| 2000–01 | Leksands IF | SEL | 18 | 4 | 3 | 7 | 12 | — | — | — | — | — |
| 2001–02 | Leksands IF | Allsv | 43 | 11 | 23 | 34 | 75 | 10 | 1 | 11 | 12 | 8 |
| 2002–03 | Leksands IF | SEL | 50 | 8 | 14 | 22 | 22 | 5 | 1 | 2 | 3 | 0 |
| 2003–04 | Leksands IF | SEL | 50 | 7 | 9 | 16 | 38 | — | — | — | — | — |
| 2004–05 | Leksands IF | Allsv | 35 | 16 | 21 | 37 | 20 | 7 | 0 | 2 | 2 | 2 |
| 2005–06 | HC Pustertal | ITA | 48 | 12 | 38 | 50 | 46 | — | — | — | — | — |
| 2006–07 | HC Pustertal | ITA | 37 | 12 | 53 | 65 | 16 | — | — | — | — | — |
| SEL totals | | | 514 | 138 | 200 | 338 | 418 | 43 | 8 | 12 | 20 | 36 |
| Allsv totals | | | 114 | 37 | 61 | 98 | 129 | 32 | 4 | 20 | 24 | 18 |

=== International ===
| Year | Team | Event | GP | G | A | Pts | PIM |
|---|---|---|---|---|---|---|---|
| 1987 | Sweden | EJC | 7 | 2 | 1 | 3 | 2 |
| 1989 | Sweden | WJC | 7 | 6 | 3 | 9 | 6 |
| 1994 | Sweden | OG | 8 | 0 | 1 | 1 | 0 |
