= Leif Rohlin =

Swedish ice hockey player

- Born: February 26, 1968 (age 58) Västerås, Sweden
- Height: 6 ft 1 in (185 cm)
- Weight: 198 lb (90 kg; 14 st 2 lb)
- Position: Defence
- Shot: Left
- Played for: Vancouver Canucks; Västerås IK; HC Ambri-Piotta; Djurgårdens IF
- National team: Sweden
- NHL draft: 33rd overall, 1988; Vancouver Canucks
- Playing career: 1988–2003

Leif Johan Rohlin (born February 26, 1968) is a former professional ice hockey defenceman who spent 2 seasons in the National Hockey League with the Vancouver Canucks and enjoyed a long career in Europe. He later worked as the General Manager of VIK Västerås HK of the second level of Swedish ice hockey, HockeyAllsvenskan from 2007 to 2010.

== Playing career ==
Rohlin was selected 33rd overall in the 1988 NHL entry draft by the Vancouver Canucks, following a strong performance at the 1988 World Junior Championships. While considered a strong NHL prospect, he continued to ply his trade in Sweden with his hometown club, Västerås IK.

Rohlin's game would continue to evolve in Sweden, although he proved difficult for the Canucks to sign. By the mid-1990s, he had earned the tag of 'best defender outside the NHL'. Strong performances at the 1994 Winter Olympics and 1995 World Championships, along with a monster 1994–95 season in the Swedish Elite League in which he scored 15 goals and 30 points in just 39 games, helped cement this status. He was finally signed by the Canucks in the summer of 1995 at the age of 27.

Rohlin entered the NHL with substantial expectations and, while he wasn't an outright flop, his performance did prove disappointing. His offensive game didn't translate to the NHL as well as had been hoped, and he lacked the grit needed to succeed in the more physical North American game. However, his solid puck-moving skills and positional smarts made him a useful depth defender. In 1995–96, he recorded 6 goals and 16 assists for 22 points in 56 games for the Canucks. Following the season, he was selected to represent Sweden in the 1996 World Cup, although he would appear in just 1 game in the tournament. In 1996–97 he would appear in just 40 games, recording 2 goals and 8 assists for 10 points. Rohlin and the Canucks would part ways following the season, and he chose to return to Europe.

Rather than go back to Sweden, Rohlin instead signed with HC Ambri-Piotta of the Swiss Nationalliga A. He would quickly establish himself as one of the top defenders in Switzerland and helped Ambri-Piotta to two Continental Cups. He would also represent Sweden again at the 2001 World Championships. He would spend 4 seasons in Switzerland before returning to Sweden in 2001 to sign with Djurgårdens IF. After a year at Djurgården, Rohlin would sign at Södertälje SK for the 2002–03 season before retiring.

In 96 NHL games, Rohlin recorded 8 goals and 24 assists for 32 points, along with 40 penalty minutes. Altogether, he would record 270 points in 602 games over 15 seasons of top-level hockey between Europe and North America.

== Career statistics ==
=== Regular season and playoffs ===
			Regular season					Playoffs
Season	Team	League	GP	G	A	Pts	PIM	GP	G	A	Pts	PIM
1986–87	Västerås IK Hockey	SWE.2	27	2	5	7	12	12	0	2	2	8
1987–88	Västerås IK Hockey	SWE.2	30	2	15	17	46	7	0	4	4	8
1988–89	Västerås IK Hockey	SEL	22	3	7	10	18	—	—	—	—	—
1988–89	Västerås IK Hockey	Allsv	18	2	5	7	20	5	0	1	1	2
1989–90	Västerås IK Hockey	SEL	32	3	6	9	40	—	—	—	—	—
1990–91	Västerås IK Hockey	SEL	40	4	10	14	46	—	—	—	—	—
1991–92	Västerås IK Hockey	SEL	39	4	6	10	52	—	—	—	—	—
1992–93	Västerås IK Hockey	SEL	37	5	7	12	24	2	0	0	0	0
1993–94	Västerås IK Hockey	SEL	40	6	14	20	26	4	0	1	1	6
1994–95	Västerås IK Hockey	SEL	39	15	15	30	46	4	2	0	2	2
1995–96	Vancouver Canucks	NHL	56	6	16	22	32	5	0	0	0	0
1996–97	Vancouver Canucks	NHL	40	2	8	10	8	—	—	—	—	—
1997–98	HC Ambrì–Piotta	NDA	40	7	29	36	28	14	4	3	7	32
1998–99	HC Ambrì–Piotta	NDA	44	8	31	39	58	15	4	9	13	18
1999–2000	HC Ambrì–Piotta	NLA	45	5	21	26	56	7	1	3	4	8
2000–01	HC Ambrì–Piotta	NLA	36	4	9	13	34	—	—	—	—	—
2001–02	Djurgårdens IF	SEL	41	2	6	8	34	5	1	0	1	8
2002–03	Södertälje SK	SEL	49	2	8	10	44	—	—	—	—	—
SEL totals			339	44	79	123	330	15	3	1	4	16
NHL totals			96	8	24	32	40	5	0	0	0	0
NDA/NLA totals			165	24	90	114	176	36	8	16	24	54

=== International ===
Year	Team	Event	GP	G	A	Pts	PIM
1988	Sweden	WJC	7	1	1	2	8
1994	Sweden	OG	8	0	1	1	10
1995	Sweden	WC	8	0	3	3	0
1996	Sweden	WCH	1	0	0	0	2
2001	Sweden	WC	9	1	1	2	6
Senior totals			26	1	5	6	18
