= Magnus Kahnberg =

Swedish ice hockey player (born 1980)

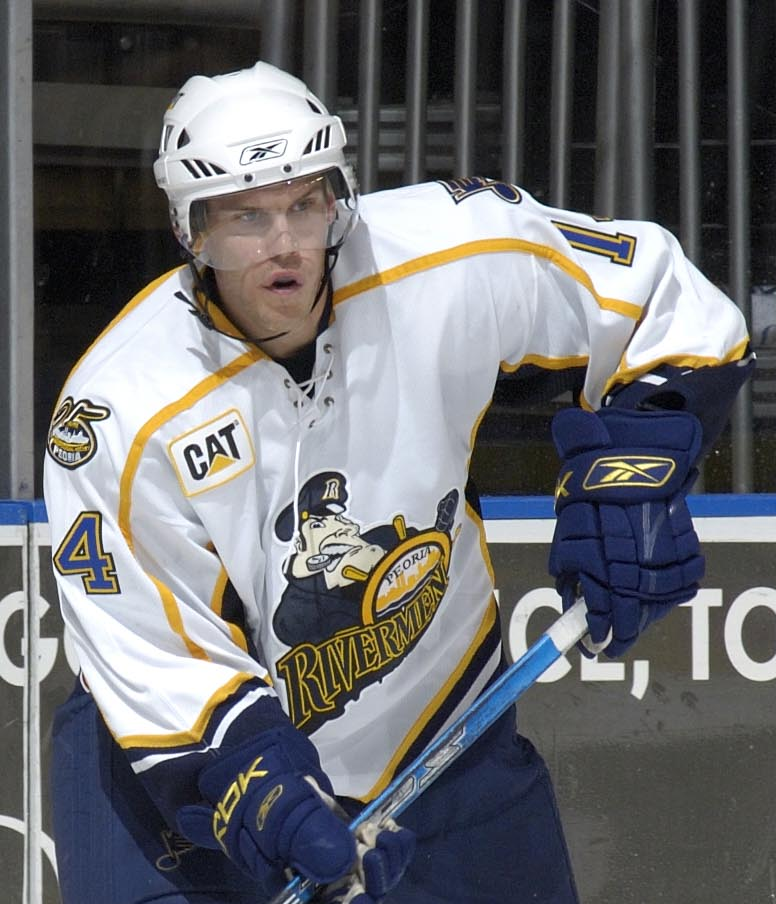
- Kahnberg with the Peoria Rivermen in 2006
- Born: 25 February 1980 (age 46) Mölndal, Sweden
- Height: 6 ft 2 in (188 cm)
- Weight: 194 lb (88 kg; 13 st 12 lb)
- Position: Right wing
- Shot: Right
- Played for: Frölunda HC; Peoria Rivermen; Brynäs IF
- National team: Sweden
- NHL draft: 212th overall, 2000; Carolina Hurricanes
- Playing career: 1999–2015

Håkan Magnus Kahnberg (born 25 February 1980) is a Swedish former professional ice hockey right winger, who most notably played for Frölunda HC in Swedish Hockey League (SHL).

Kahnberg is a cousin of fellow Frölunda HC player Nicklas Lasu.

== Playing career ==
Kahnberg was eventually acquired by the St. Louis Blues and played for their American Hockey League affiliate the Peoria Rivermen in 2006 only to return to the Swedish league that same year. On 31 March 2009, Kahnberg signed a two-year contract with Brynäs IF. After two seasons with Brynäs, Kahnberg returned to Frölunda HC for the 2011–12 season.

== Career statistics ==
=== Regular season and playoffs ===
			Regular season					Playoffs
Season	Team	League	GP	G	A	Pts	PIM	GP	G	A	Pts	PIM
1996–97	IF Mölndal Hockey	SWE.3	4	0	0	0	0	—	—	—	—	—
1997–98	Västra Frölunda HC	J20	28	6	7	13	6	—	—	—	—	—
1998–99	Västra Frölunda HC	J20	34	23	18	41	4	—	—	—	—	—
1999–2000	Västra Frölunda HC	J20	35	45	21	66	30	6	7	4	11	4
1999–2000	Västra Frölunda HC	SEL	4	0	0	0	0	—	—	—	—	—
2000–01	Västra Frölunda HC	J20	2	2	1	3	2	—	—	—	—	—
2000–01	Västra Frölunda HC	SEL	50	8	6	14	6	5	0	0	0	2
2001–02	Västra Frölunda HC	SEL	50	14	11	25	24	10	5	0	5	2
2002–03	Västra Frölunda HC	SEL	50	14	20	34	22	15	2	6	8	12
2003–04	Västra Frölunda HC	SEL	50	33	16	49	20	10	5	2	7	10
2004–05	Frölunda HC	SEL	46	15	8	23	22	13	5	1	6	4
2005–06	Frölunda HC	SEL	45	18	15	33	26	17	4	3	7	16
2006–07	Peoria Rivermen	AHL	17	2	6	8	4	—	—	—	—	—
2006–07	Frölunda HC	SEL	26	3	10	13	8	—	—	—	—	—
2007–08	Frölunda HC	SEL	52	16	21	37	30	7	2	1	3	4
2008–09	Frölunda HC	SEL	55	9	16	25	16	11	0	2	2	4
2009–10	Brynäs IF	SEL	55	20	11	31	32	5	0	3	3	2
2010–11	Brynäs IF	SEL	40	6	7	13	12	5	4	3	7	0
2011–12	Frölunda HC	SEL	29	9	11	20	4	6	2	1	3	2
2012–13	Frölunda HC	SEL	49	11	15	26	10	6	2	1	3	8
2013–14	Frölunda HC	SHL	55	18	15	33	22	5	1	0	1	2
2014–15	Frölunda HC	SHL	26	1	4	5	10	—	—	—	—	—
SHL totals			682	195	186	381	264	115	32	23	55	68

Medal record

Representing Sweden

Ice hockey

World Championships
Silver medal – second place	2004 Prague	

=== International ===
Year	Team	Event	Result	GP	G	A	Pts	PIM
2004	Sweden	WC	2nd place, silver medalist(s)	7	1	1	2	2
2005	Sweden	WC	4th	7	2	0	2	4
2007	Sweden	WC	4th	2	0	0	0	2
Senior totals				16	3	1	4	8

== Awards and honors ==
Award	Year
SHL
Le Mat trophy (Frölunda HC)	2003, 2005
All-Star Team	2004
Guldhjälmen	2004
