= Wally Schreiber =

Canadian ice hockey player

- Born: April 15, 1962 (age 64) Edmonton, Alberta, Canada
- Height: 5 ft 10 in (178 cm)
- Weight: 176 lb (80 kg; 12 st 8 lb)
- Position: Right wing
- Shot: Right
- Played for: Minnesota North Stars; Schwenninger ERC; EC Hedos München; EV Landshut; Hannover Scorpions
- NHL draft: 152nd overall, 1982; Washington Capitals
- Playing career: 1982–2006

Wallace E. Schreiber (born April 15, 1962) is a Canadian former professional ice hockey right winger.

== Career ==
Schreiber was drafted 152nd overall by the Washington Capitals in the 1982 NHL entry draft. He would go on to play a total of 41 games in the National Hockey League with the Minnesota North Stars. In 1989, Schreiber moved to Germany with Schwenninger ERC and later played for EC Hedos München, EV Landshut and the Hannover Scorpions. He remained active in Germany until his retirement in 2006 at the age of 44.

Schreiber was a member of the Canadian national team in the 1988, 1992 and 1994 Winter Olympics, winning two silver medals.

His nephew is Mike Schreiber of the Hannover Indians.

== Career statistics ==
=== Regular season and playoffs ===
			Regular season					Playoffs
Season	Team	League	GP	G	A	Pts	PIM	GP	G	A	Pts	PIM
1980–81	Fort Saskatchewan Traders	AJHL	55	39	41	80	105	—	—	—	—	—
1981–82	Regina Pats	WHL	68	56	68	124	68	20	12	12	24	34
1982–83	Fort Wayne Komets	IHL	67	24	34	58	23	—	—	—	—	—
1983–84	Fort Wayne Komets	IHL	82	47	66	113	44	6	3	3	6	6
1984–85	Fort Wayne Komets	IHL	81	51	58	109	45	13	3	7	10	10
1985–86	Fort Wayne Komets	IHL	72	37	52	89	38	15	8	10	18	6
1986–87	Canada	Intl	70	40	37	77	27	—	—	—	—	—
1987–88	Canada	Intl	69	25	17	42	36	—	—	—	—	—
1987–88	Minnesota North Stars	NHL	16	6	5	11	2	—	—	—	—	—
1988–89	Minnesota North Stars	NHL	25	2	5	7	10	—	—	—	—	—
1988–89	Fort Wayne Komets	IHL	32	15	16	31	51	—	—	—	—	—
1988–89	Kalamazoo Wings	IHL	5	5	7	12	2	—	—	—	—	—
1989–90	Schwenninger ERC	1.GBun	36	25	29	54	28	10	7	13	20	4
1989–90	Canada	Intl	5	1	0	1	2	—	—	—	—	—
1990–91	Schwenninger ERC	1.GBun	37	26	43	69	34	4	1	4	5	0
1991–92	Schwenninger ERC	1.GBun	44	32	43	75	31	2	0	1	1	27
1992–93	Schwenninger ERC	1.GBun	44	23	31	54	28	7	2	5	7	2
1993–94	EC Hedos München	1.GBun	44	25	30	55	27	10	5	11	16	2
1993–94	Canada	Intl	12	2	3	5	2	—	—	—	—	—
1994–95	EV Landshut	DEL	42	28	27	55	26	18	12	15	27	26
1994–95	Canada	Intl	3	1	0	1	2	—	—	—	—	—
1995–96	EV Landshut	DEL	50	26	30	56	46	11	5	9	14	14
1996–97	EV Landshut	DEL	47	22	29	51	12	7	1	9	10	2
1997–98	EV Landshut	DEL	43	16	14	30	41	6	1	6	7	2
1998–99	EV Landshut	DEL	50	19	37	56	20	3	0	1	1	0
1999–2000	Hannover Scorpions	DEL	55	13	31	44	24	—	—	—	—	—
2000–01	Hannover Scorpions	DEL	54	27	26	53	56	6	0	2	2	6
2001–02	Hannover Scorpions	DEL	60	11	24	35	28	—	—	—	—	—
2002–03	Hannover Scorpions	DEL	49	11	15	26	68	—	—	—	—	—
2003–04	SERC Wild Wings	DEU II	41	21	38	59	20	3	3	0	3	8
2004–05	SERC Wild Wings	DEU II	44	18	23	41	22	7	3	5	8	4
2005–06	Hannover Scorpions	DEL	27	1	4	5	6	10	2	2	4	6
NHL totals			41	8	10	18	12
IHL totals			339	179	233	412	203	34	14	20	34	22
1.GBun totals			205	131	176	307	148	33	15	34	49	35
DEL totals			477	174	237	411	327	61	21	44	65	56

=== International ===
Year	Team	Event	GP	G	A	Pts	PIM
1988	Canada	OG	8	1	2	3	2
1992	Canada	OG	8	2	2	4	2
1994	Canada	OG	8	1	0	1	2
Senior totals			24	4	4	8	6
