= Andreas Johansson (ice hockey) =

Swedish ice hockey player (born 1973)

- Born: May 19, 1973 (age 53) Hofors, Sweden
- Height: 6 ft 0 in (183 cm)
- Weight: 209 lb (95 kg; 14 st 13 lb)
- Position: Left wing/Centre
- Shot: Left
- Played for: Färjestads BK; New York Islanders; Pittsburgh Penguins; Ottawa Senators; Calgary Flames; Tampa Bay Lightning; SC Bern; New York Rangers; Nashville Predators; Genève–Servette HC; SKA Saint Petersburg; Leksands IF
- National team: Sweden
- NHL draft: 136th overall, 1991; New York Islanders
- Playing career: 1991–2009

Andreas Lars Johansson (born May 19, 1973) is a Swedish former professional ice hockey player and coach. Johansson played professionally in the Swedish Elite League, Swiss National League A, the National Hockey League (NHL), and in the Russian Superleague. He returned to Sweden in 2009 where he finished his career. He was assistant coach for Modo Hockey in the 2010–11 season.

== Career ==
Johansson began his pro career with Färjestad BK in Sweden. He was drafted 136th overall by the New York Islanders in the 1991 NHL entry draft and played in the NHL for the Islanders (1995–96), Pittsburgh Penguins (1996–98), Ottawa Senators (1998–99), Tampa Bay Lightning (1999), Calgary Flames (1999–2000), New York Rangers (2001–02), and Nashville Predators (2002–04). In the 2000–01 season he played with the Swiss club SC Bern and after the 2003–04 season he went back to Switzerland where he signed with Genève-Servette HC and played with them for two seasons. In 2006/07 he returned to Färjestad. In 2007, he signed with Russian Super League team SKA Saint Petersburg. He played there for one season, but was contracted for two seasons (he did not play in the second season). Johansson then signed with Leksands IF of the HockeyAllsvenskan in 2009. However, he only played one game with Leksand before announcing his retirement due to injury.

Prior to the 2010–11 season, he signed as assistant coach of Modo Hockey of the Elitserien. He left the club after the end of the season due to family issues. In January 2011, he was named assistant coach for Färjestad BK of the Elitserien.

== Career statistics ==
=== Regular season and playoffs ===
			Regular season					Playoffs
Season	Team	League	GP	G	A	Pts	PIM	GP	G	A	Pts	PIM
1987–88	Hofors HC	SWE.3	1	0	0	0	0	—	—	—	—	—
1988–89	Hofors HC	SWE.3	28	19	11	30		—	—	—	—	—
1989–90	Falu IF	SWE U20
1989–90	Falu IF	SWE.2	21	3	1	4	14	—	—	—	—	—
1990–91	Falu IF	SWE.2	31	12	10	22	38	—	—	—	—	—
1991–92	Färjestads BK	SEL	30	3	1	4	10	6	0	0	0	4
1992–93	Farjestads BK	SEL	38	4	7	11	38	2	0	0	0	0
1993–94	Farjestads BK	SEL	20	3	6	9	6	—	—	—	—	—
1993–94	Farjestads BK	Allsv	18	8	10	18	18	3	1	4	5	2
1994–95	Farjestads BK	SEL	36	9	10	19	42	4	0	0	0	10
1995–96	New York Islanders	NHL	3	0	1	1	0	—	—	—	—	—
1995–96	Worcester IceCats	AHL	29	5	5	10	32	—	—	—	—	—
1995–96	Utah Grizzlies	IHL	22	4	13	17	28	12	0	5	5	6
1996–97	New York Islanders	NHL	15	2	2	4	0	—	—	—	—	—
1996–97	Pittsburgh Penguins	NHL	27	2	7	9	20	—	—	—	—	—
1996–97	Cleveland Lumberjacks	IHL	10	2	4	6	42	11	1	5	6	8
1997–98	Pittsburgh Penguins	NHL	50	5	10	15	20	1	0	0	0	0
1998–99	Ottawa Senators	NHL	69	21	16	37	34	2	0	0	0	0
1999–2000	Calgary Flames	NHL	28	3	7	10	14	—	—	—	—	—
1999–2000	Tampa Bay Lightning	NHL	12	2	3	5	8	—	—	—	—	—
2000–01	SC Bern	NLA	40	15	29	44	94	7	5	4	9	0
2001–02	New York Rangers	NHL	70	14	10	24	46	—	—	—	—	—
2002–03	Nashville Predators	NHL	56	20	17	37	22	—	—	—	—	—
2003–04	Nashville Predators	NHL	47	12	15	27	26	6	0	0	0	0
2003–04	Milwaukee Admirals	AHL	1	0	0	0	2	—	—	—	—	—
2004–05	Genève–Servette HC	NLA	40	12	26	38	60	4	0	6	6	24
2005–06	Genève–Servette HC	NLA	34	10	17	27	89	—	—	—	—	—
2006–07	Farjestads BK	SEL	19	2	11	13	20	—	—	—	—	—
2007–08	SKA Saint Petersburg	RSL	49	14	21	35	70	6	1	1	2	16
2009–10	Leksands IF	Allsv	1	0	0	0	0	—	—	—	—	—
SEL totals			143	21	35	56	122	12	0	0	0	14
NHL totals			377	81	88	169	190	9	0	0	0	0
NLA totals			114	37	72	109	243	11	5	10	15	24

Medal record

Representing Sweden

World Championships
Silver medal – second place	1995 Gävle/Stockholm	
Silver medal – second place	2004 Prague	
Bronze medal – third place	2001 Cologne/Nuremberg	
Bronze medal – third place	2002 Gothemburg	

World Junior Championships
Silver medal – second place	1992 Füssen/Kaufbeuren	
Silver medal – second place	1993 Gävle	

=== International ===
Year	Team	Event	GP	G	A	Pts	PIM
1991	Sweden	EJC	5	5
1992	Sweden	WJC	7	1	2	3	4
1993	Sweden	WJC	7	1	5	6	14
1995	Sweden	WC	8	3	6	9	8
1996	Sweden	WCH	2	0	0	0	2
1998	Sweden	OG	4	0	0	0	2
2001	Sweden	WC	9	3	2	5	10
2002	Sweden	WC	9	1	3	4	18
2004	Sweden	WC	7	0	3	3	10
2004	Sweden	WCH	4	0	0	0	4
Senior totals			43	7	14	21	54
