= Daniel Rydmark =

Swedish ice hockey player

- Born: February 23, 1970 (age 56) Västerås, Sweden
- Height: 5 ft 10 in (178 cm)
- Weight: 187 lb (85 kg; 13 st 5 lb)
- Position: Centre
- Shot: Left
- Played for: Färjestads BK; Malmö IF; Phoenix Roadrunners; VIK Västerås HK
- National team: Sweden
- NHL draft: 123rd overall, 1989; Los Angeles Kings
- Playing career: 1988–2004

Daniel Kjell Rydmark (born February 23, 1970) is a Swedish former professional ice hockey player. He played during his career for VIK Västerås HK, Färjestads BK, Malmö IF Redhawks, and Phoenix Roadrunners. He won three Swedish Championships during his career-one with Färjestads in 1988 and two with Malmö in 1992 and 1994 . The Los Angeles Kings drafted him in the 1989 NHL entry draft as the 123rd pick overall. He never played with the Kings, but he played eleven games with Phoenix Roadrunners of the IHL in 1995.

== Career statistics ==
=== Regular season and playoffs ===
			Regular season					Playoffs
Season	Team	League	GP	G	A	Pts	PIM	GP	G	A	Pts	PIM
1985–86	Västerås IK Hockey	SWE II	1	1	0	1	0	—	—	—	—	—
1986–87	Färjestad BK	SEL	4	0	1	1	0	—	—	—	—	—
1987–88	Färjestad BK	SEL	28	2	1	3	10	5	0	0	0	2
1988–89	Färjestad BK	SEL	35	9	9	18	24	—	—	—	—	—
1989–90	Färjestad BK	SEL	35	9	12	21	20	5	0	0	0	4
1990–91	Malmö IF	SEL	39	14	13	27	34	1	0	0	0	0
1991–92	Malmö IF	SEL	30	17	15	32	56	7	0	3	3	6
1992–93	Malmö IF	SEL	39	17	13	30	70	6	5	4	9	8
1993–94	Malmö IF	SEL	38	14	18	32	48	11	3	7	10	18
1994–95	Malmö IF	SEL	23	8	7	15	24	9	1	2	3	31
1995–96	Phoenix Roadrunners	IHL	11	2	0	2	12	—	—	—	—	—
1995–96	Malmö IF	SEL	21	4	3	7	38	5	0	1	1	32
1996–97	MIF Redhawks	SEL	49	13	23	36	80	4	1	4	5	4
1997–98	MIF Redhawks	SEL	44	7	12	19	46	—	—	—	—	—
1998–99	Västerås IK Hockey	SEL	49	18	13	31	55	—	—	—	—	—
1999–2000	Västerås IK Hockey	SEL	46	17	17	34	36	—	—	—	—	—
2000–01	MIF Redhawks	SEL	43	6	9	15	48	9	1	4	5	33
2001–02	MIF Redhawks	SEL	48	11	15	26	52	5	0	4	4	4
2002–03	MIF Redhawks	SEL	50	21	20	41	66	—	—	—	—	—
2003–04	Malmö Redhawks	SEL	47	3	3	6	102	—	—	—	—	—
2004–05	Hästen Hockey	SWE II	27	10	19	29	73	—	—	—	—	—
2004–05	Borås HC	SWE II	5	1	4	5	2	7	0	1	1	4
SEL totals			668	190	204	394	809	67	11	29	40	142

=== International ===
Year	Team	Event	GP	G	A	Pts	PIM
1988	Sweden	EJC	6	10	5	15	4
1989	Sweden	WJC	7	3	3	6	10
1990	Sweden	WJC	7	3	7	10	10
1992	Sweden	OG	6	1	1	2	2
1992	Sweden	WC	8	0	1	1	4
1994	Sweden	OG	8	0	0	0	8
Junior totals			20	16	15	31	24
Senior totals			22	1	2	3	14
