= Jonathan Hedström =

Swedish ice hockey player

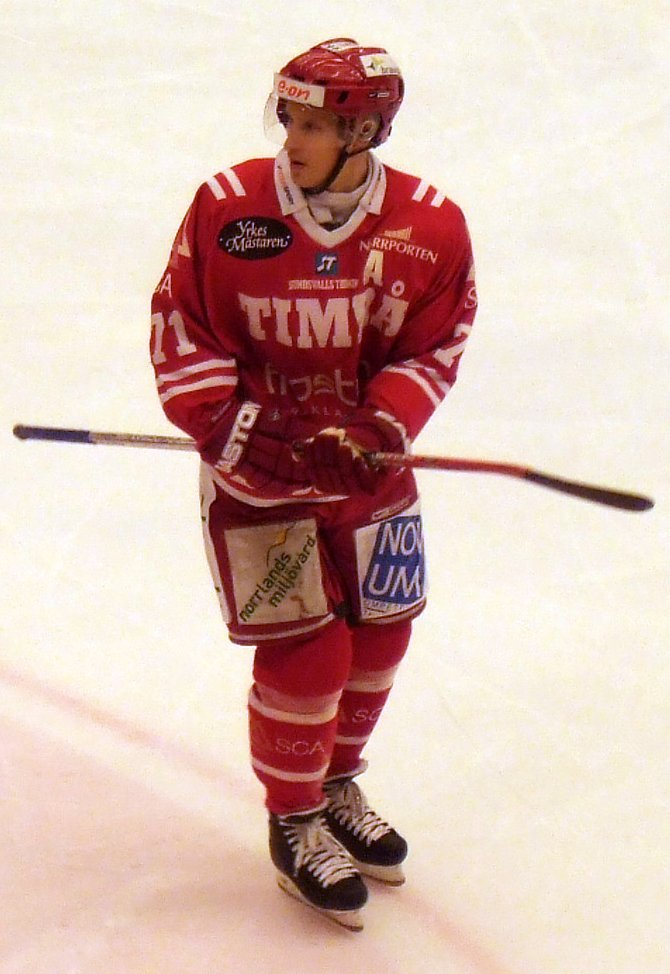
- Born: 27 December 1977 (age 48) Skellefteå, Sweden
- Height: 6 ft 0 in (183 cm)
- Weight: 200 lb (91 kg; 14 st 4 lb)
- Position: Right wing
- Shot: Left
- Played for: Djurgårdens IF; Mighty Ducks of Anaheim; Cincinnati Mighty Ducks; Skellefteå AIK; Timrå IK; CSKA Moscow; Luleå HF; Oulun Kärpät
- National team: Sweden
- NHL draft: 221st overall, 1997; Toronto Maple Leafs
- Playing career: 1999–2015

Jonathan "Jonte" Hedström (born 27 December 1977) is a Swedish former professional ice hockey left winger.

== Playing career ==
Hedström was drafted by the Toronto Maple Leafs with their 9th round pick, 221st overall, in the 1997 NHL entry draft. In June 2000 he was traded the Mighty Ducks of Anaheim for 6th (Vadim Sozinov) and 7th (Markus Seikola) round selections in the 2000 NHL entry draft.

After only having played three playoff games with Anaheim in the 2006 Stanley Cup Playoffs, Hedström decided to return to Skellefteå in Sweden and be with his pregnant wife. On 15 August 2006, he signed a four-year deal with Timrå IK of the Elitserien (SEL) and joined than in September 2008 to HC CSKA Moscow in the Kontinental Hockey League (KHL). He left Russian club HC CSKA Moscow and signed with Swedish club Luleå HF prior to the 2009–10 season. He only remained in Luleå for one year before signing with Kärpät of the SM-liiga prior to the 2010–11 season.

Hedström left Kärpät mid-season and, surprisingly, signed with the Swedish Division 1 team Asplöven HC for the rest of the 2010–11 season. On 18 August 2011, Hedström signed a one-year contract with Timrå IK to return to his former team. On November 19, 2013, Hedström officially announced his retirement from hockey.

== Awards ==
- Silver medal at the 2004 World Championship.

== Career statistics ==
=== Regular season and playoffs ===
			Regular season					Playoffs
Season	Team	League	GP	G	A	Pts	PIM	GP	G	A	Pts	PIM
1995–96	Skellefteå AIK	SWE-2	7	0	0	0	0	—	—	—	—	—
1996–97	Skellefteå AIK	SWE-Jr	9	4	4	8	—	—	—	—	—	—
1996–97	Skellefteå AIK	SWE-2	12	1	1	2	10	6	0	0	0	2
1997–98	Skellefteå AIK	SWE-2	30	5	5	10	15	—	—	—	—	—
1998–99	Skellefteå AIK	SWE-2	35	15	29	44	76	5	1	4	5	4
1999–00	Luleå HF	SEL	48	9	17	26	46	9	2	1	3	12
2000–01	Luleå HF	SEL	46	9	19	28	68	12	1	6	7	16
2001–02	Luleå HF	SEL	47	11	7	18	38	4	2	1	3	6
2002–03	Cincinnati Mighty Ducks	AHL	50	14	21	35	62	—	—	—	—	—
2002–03	Mighty Ducks of Anaheim	NHL	4	0	0	0	0	—	—	—	—	—
2003–04	Djurgårdens IF	SEL	48	12	22	34	94	3	0	2	2	12
2004–05	Timrå IK	SEL	46	14	21	35	92	7	3	5	8	16
2005–06	Mighty Ducks of Anaheim	NHL	79	13	14	27	48	3	0	1	1	2
2006–07	Timrå IK	SEL	54	13	25	38	74	7	2	3	5	14
2007–08	Timrå IK	SEL	27	7	6	13	50	—	—	—	—	—
2008–09	Timrå IK	SEL	11	0	2	2	8	—	—	—	—	—
2008–09	CSKA Moscow	KHL	31	1	6	7	24	8	0	1	1	8
2009–10	Luleå HF	SEL	48	2	16	18	63	—	—	—	—	—
2010–11	Kärpät	FIN	18	2	4	6	16	—	—	—	—	—
2010–11	Asplöven HC	SWE-3	14	6	18	24	8	9	4	4	8	8
2011–12	Timrå IK	SEL	53	9	12	21	72	9	1	5	6	14
2012–13	Timrå IK	SEL	52	6	12	18	34	9	2	1	3	0
2013–14	Piteå HC	SWE-3	5	1	3	4	4	—	—	—	—	—
2013–14	Haninge Anchors HC	SWE-4	1	2	0	2	0	1	0	0	0	0
2014–15	Brunflo IK	SWE-4	1	0	2	2	0	—	—	—	—	—
2014–15	IF Sundsvall	SWE-2	6	0	5	5	6	9	0	4	4	6
2018–19	Åsele IK	SWE-4	2	0	1	1	2	—	—	—	—	—
SEL totals			480	92	159	251	639	60	13	24	37	90
NHL totals			83	13	14	27	48	3	0	1	1	2

Medal record

Representing Sweden

Ice hockey

World Championships
Silver medal – second place	2004 Czech Republic	

=== International ===
Year	Team	Event	GP	G	A	Pts	PIM
2004	Sweden	WC	8	1	1	2	6
2005	Sweden	WC	9	3	4	7	10
2007	Sweden	WC	8	3	2	5	18
Senior totals			5	1	3	4	4
