= Janne Grönvall =

Finnish ice hockey player

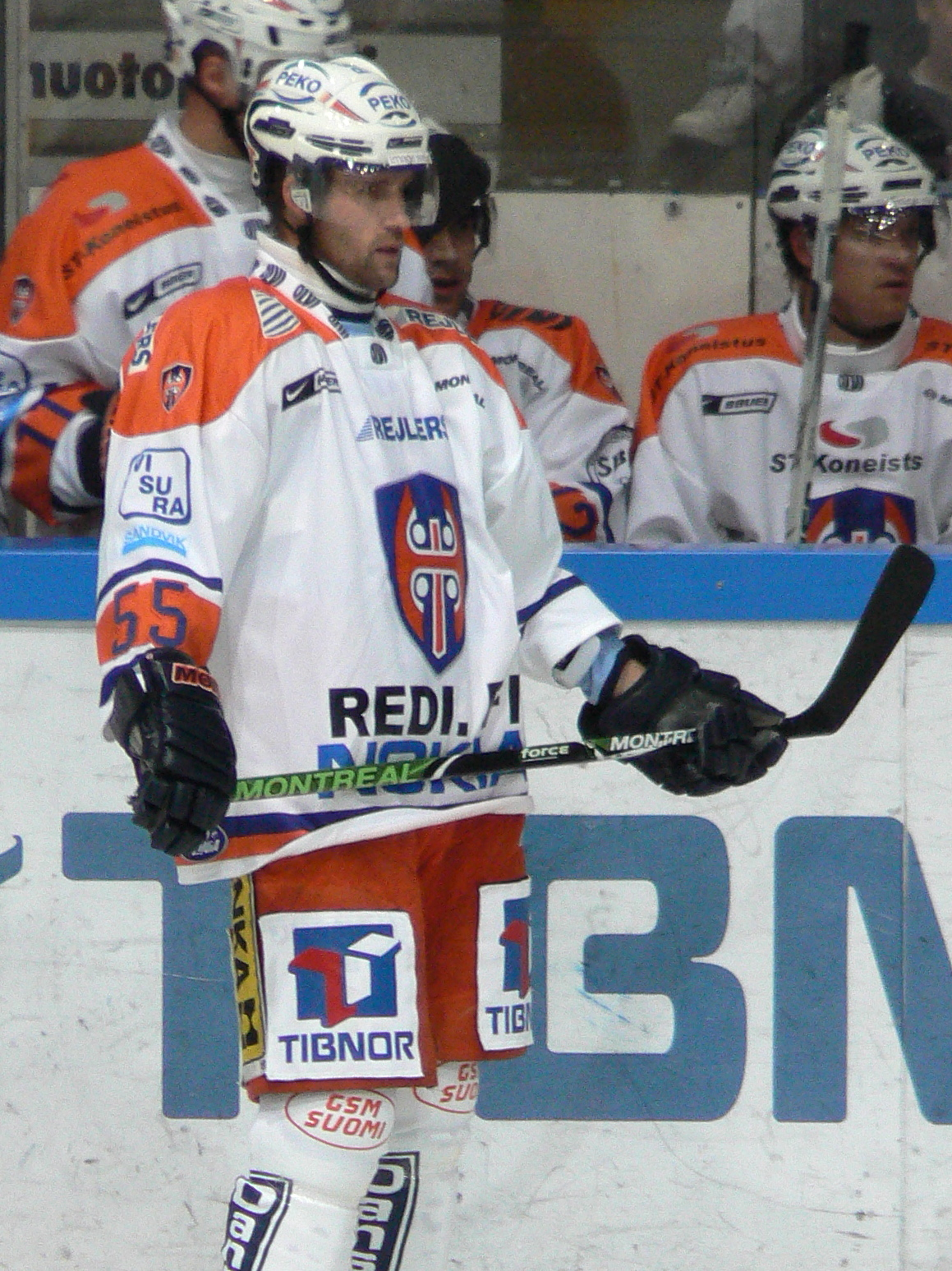
- Born: July 17, 1973 (age 52) Rauma, Finland
- Height: 6 ft 3 in (191 cm)
- Weight: 198 lb (90 kg; 14 st 2 lb)
- Position: Defence
- Shot: left
- SM-liiga team: Tappara
- National team: Finland
- NHL draft: 101 overall, 1992; Toronto Maple Leafs
- Playing career: 1989–2010

Janne Grönvall (born July 17, 1973) is a retired professional Finnish ice hockey player.

He last played for Tappara in the Finnish SM-liiga. This was his third stint with the club. He first joined the club in 1992, when he left Lukko Rauma. In 1994, he left them for the AHL club St. John's Maple Leafs, which was the affiliate team of Toronto Maple Leafs who drafted Grönvall in the 1992 NHL entry draft. After two season in North America and zero games in the NHL Grönvall moved back home to Finland and Tappara. This time he stayed with Tappara until 2003 when he signed with Swedish Elite League team Färjestad BK. After two seasons and two runners-up medals in Sweden with Färjestad Grönvall decided once again to move back home and once again signed with Tappara. He eventually ended his career playing for Krefeld Pinguine in the German DEL league.

Grönvall represented Finland at the 2001 World Hockey Championship.

== Career statistics ==
=== Regular season and playoffs ===
| | | | Regular season | | | | | Playoffs |
| Season | Team | League | GP | G | A | Pts | PIM | GP | G | A | Pts | PIM |
|---|---|---|---|---|---|---|---|---|---|---|---|---|
| 1988–89 | Lukko | FIN.2 U20 | 13 | 3 | 3 | 6 | 6 | — | — | — | — | — |
| 1989–90 | Lukko | FIN.2 U20 | 12 | 4 | 5 | 9 | 12 | 12 | 1 | 4 | 5 | 18 |
| 1989–90 | Lukko | SM-l | 5 | 0 | 0 | 0 | 0 | — | — | — | — | — |
| 1990–91 | Lukko | FIN U20 | 13 | 4 | 14 | 18 | 30 | — | — | — | — | — |
| 1990–91 | Lukko | SM-l | 40 | 2 | 8 | 10 | 30 | — | — | — | — | — |
| 1991–92 | Lukko | FIN U20 | 2 | 0 | 1 | 1 | 2 | — | — | — | — | — |
| 1991–92 | Lukko | SM-l | 42 | 2 | 6 | 8 | 40 | 2 | 0 | 0 | 0 | 2 |
| 1992–93 | Tappara | SM-l | 46 | 1 | 7 | 8 | 54 | — | — | — | — | — |
| 1993–94 | Tappara | SM-l | 47 | 2 | 9 | 11 | 54 | 10 | 0 | 4 | 4 | 31 |
| 1993–94 | Tappara | FIN.2 U20 | — | — | — | — | — | 2 | 0 | 0 | 0 | 0 |
| 1993–94 | St. John's Maple Leafs | AHL | — | — | — | — | — | 9 | 0 | 0 | 0 | 2 |
| 1994–95 | St. John's Maple Leafs | AHL | 76 | 8 | 29 | 37 | 75 | 5 | 0 | 0 | 0 | 0 |
| 1995–96 | St. John's Maple Leafs | AHL | 76 | 4 | 31 | 35 | 82 | 2 | 1 | 0 | 1 | 2 |
| 1996–97 | Tappara | SM-l | 46 | 6 | 10 | 16 | 44 | 3 | 0 | 1 | 1 | 4 |
| 1997–98 | Tappara | SM-l | 47 | 6 | 14 | 20 | 42 | 4 | 0 | 0 | 0 | 0 |
| 1998–99 | Tappara | SM-l | 53 | 6 | 10 | 16 | 91 | — | — | — | — | — |
| 1999–2000 | Tappara | SM-l | 53 | 4 | 11 | 15 | 46 | 4 | 2 | 1 | 3 | 12 |
| 2000–01 | Tappara | SM-l | 53 | 4 | 11 | 15 | 97 | 10 | 1 | 2 | 3 | 4 |
| 2001–02 | Tappara | SM-l | 56 | 8 | 7 | 15 | 82 | 10 | 1 | 3 | 4 | 6 |
| 2002–03 | Tappara | SM-l | 55 | 5 | 13 | 18 | 89 | 15 | 0 | 3 | 3 | 10 |
| 2003–04 | Färjestad BK | SEL | 50 | 1 | 10 | 11 | 98 | 17 | 0 | 1 | 1 | 16 |
| 2004–05 | Färjestad BK | SEL | 48 | 0 | 3 | 3 | 42 | 15 | 2 | 4 | 6 | 10 |
| 2005–06 | Tappara | SM-l | 51 | 11 | 9 | 20 | 83 | 4 | 0 | 0 | 0 | 2 |
| 2006–07 | Tappara | SM-l | 35 | 1 | 3 | 4 | 20 | 5 | 0 | 0 | 0 | 2 |
| 2007–08 | Tappara | SM-l | 55 | 2 | 15 | 17 | 46 | 11 | 2 | 2 | 4 | 8 |
| 2008–09 | Tappara | SM-l | 57 | 1 | 5 | 6 | 50 | — | — | — | — | — |
| 2009–10 | Krefeld Pinguine | DEL | 45 | 0 | 7 | 7 | 22 | — | — | — | — | — |
| SM-l totals | | | 741 | 61 | 138 | 199 | 868 | 82 | 6 | 16 | 22 | 83 |
| AHL totals | | | 152 | 12 | 60 | 72 | 157 | 16 | 1 | 0 | 1 | 4 |
| SEL totals | | | 98 | 1 | 13 | 14 | 140 | 32 | 2 | 5 | 7 | 26 |

=== International ===
| Year | Team | Event | GP | G | A | Pts | PIM |
|---|---|---|---|---|---|---|---|
| 1991 | Finland | WJC | 6 | 0 | 0 | 0 | 4 |
| 1991 | Finland | EJC | 6 | 1 | 3 | 4 | 4 |
| 1992 | Finland | WJC | 7 | 2 | 1 | 3 | 12 |
| 1993 | Finland | WJC | 7 | 1 | 2 | 3 | 6 |
| 2001 | Finland | WC | 7 | 0 | 0 | 0 | 8 |
| Junior totals | | | 26 | 4 | 6 | 10 | 26 |
