= Jan Alinč =

Czech ice hockey player (born 1972)

Personal information
- Nationality: Czech
- Born: 27 May 1972 (age 53) Louny, Czechoslovakia

Sport
- Sport: Ice hockey

Jan Alinč (born 27 May 1972) is a Czech former ice hockey player. He competed in the men's tournament at the 1994 Winter Olympics.

== Career statistics ==
=== Regular season and playoffs ===
| | | | Regular season | | | | | Playoffs |
| Season | Team | League | GP | G | A | Pts | PIM | GP | G | A | Pts | PIM |
|---|---|---|---|---|---|---|---|---|---|---|---|---|
| 1988–89 | TJ CHZ Litvínov | TCH U18 |
| 1989–90 | TJ CHZ Litvínov | TCH U18 |
| 1990–91 | HC CHZ Litvínov | TCH U18 | 29 | 22 | 23 | 45 | | — | — | — | — | — |
| 1990–91 | HC CHZ Litvínov | TCH | 7 | 1 | 1 | 2 | 0 | 4 | 1 | 0 | 1 | 0 |
| 1991–92 | HC Chemopetrol Litvínov | TCH | 36 | 16 | 12 | 28 | 24 | 9 | 5 | 4 | 9 |
| 1992–93 | HC Chemopetrol Litvínov | TCH | 25 | 11 | 11 | 22 | | 11 | 5 | 3 | 8 |
| 1993–94 | HC Chemopetrol Litvínov | ELH | 37 | 17 | 25 | 42 | 46 | 4 | 1 | 2 | 3 | 6 |
| 1994–95 | HC Litvínov, s.r.o. | ELH | 42 | 16 | 32 | 48 | 52 | 4 | 3 | 2 | 5 | 2 |
| 1995–96 | HC Litvínov, s.r.o. | ELH | 38 | 15 | 30 | 45 | 88 | 15 | 2 | 5 | 7 | 10 |
| 1996–97 | Ässät | SM-l | 47 | 9 | 16 | 25 | 16 | 4 | 0 | 4 | 4 | 2 |
| 1997–98 | Ässät | SM-l | 15 | 2 | 8 | 10 | 10 | — | — | — | — | — |
| 1997–98 | HC Chemopetrol, a.s. | ELH | 31 | 11 | 20 | 31 | 14 | 4 | 1 | 2 | 3 | 14 |
| 1998–99 | Modo Hockey | SEL | 48 | 7 | 11 | 18 | 22 | 9 | 1 | 0 | 1 | 0 |
| 1999–2000 | HC Chemopetrol, a.s. | ELH | 48 | 19 | 15 | 34 | 74 | 6 | 0 | 1 | 1 | 25 |
| 2000–01 | HC Slavia Praha | ELH | 44 | 12 | 35 | 47 | 18 | 11 | 1 | 6 | 7 | 0 |
| 2001–02 | HC Becherovka Karlovy Vary | ELH | 33 | 9 | 18 | 27 | 18 | — | — | — | — | — |
| 2001–02 | HC Slavia Praha | ELH | 12 | 1 | 6 | 7 | 45 | — | — | — | — | — |
| 2002–03 | HC Chemopetrol, a.s. | ELH | 37 | 5 | 13 | 18 | 22 | — | — | — | — | — |
| 2002–03 | HC Energie Karlovy Vary | ELH | 8 | 0 | 4 | 4 | 4 | — | — | — | — | — |
| 2003–04 | HC Energie Karlovy Vary | ELH | 48 | 11 | 11 | 22 | 46 | — | — | — | — | — |
| 2004–05 | HC Energie Karlovy Vary | ELH | 47 | 10 | 14 | 24 | 42 | — | — | — | — | — |
| 2005–06 | HC Energie Karlovy Vary | ELH | 37 | 10 | 11 | 21 | 40 | — | — | — | — | — |
| 2005–06 | Kölner Haie | DEL | 5 | 3 | 0 | 3 | 6 | 9 | 2 | 4 | 6 | 4 |
| 2006–07 | Krefeld Pinguine | DEL | 36 | 13 | 33 | 46 | 34 | — | — | — | — | — |
| 2007–08 | Krefeld Pinguine | DEL | 47 | 17 | 37 | 54 | 40 | — | — | — | — | — |
| 2008–09 | Füchse Duisburg | DEL | 45 | 15 | 18 | 33 | 70 | — | — | — | — | — |
| 2009–10 | HC Slovan Ústečtí Lvi | CZE.2 | 42 | 14 | 27 | 41 | 41 | 17 | 3 | 14 | 17 | 6 |
| 2010–11 | HC Slovan Ústečtí Lvi | CZE.2 | 32 | 7 | 18 | 25 | 28 | 14 | 3 | 5 | 8 | 10 |
| 2011–12 | HC Slovan Ústečtí Lvi | CZE.2 | 26 | 9 | 21 | 30 | 6 | 11 | 2 | 14 | 16 | 4 |
| 2011–12 | HC Slavia Praha | ELH | 22 | 5 | 11 | 16 | 14 | — | — | — | — | — |
| 2012–13 | HC Slavia Praha | ELH | 48 | 2 | 18 | 20 | 12 | 11 | 1 | 2 | 3 | 0 |
| 2013–14 | HC Slovan Ústečtí Lvi | CZE.2 | 34 | 4 | 18 | 22 | 12 | — | — | — | — | — |
| 2014–15 | HC Most | CZE.2 | 45 | 2 | 20 | 22 | 32 | — | — | — | — | — |
| 2015–16 | HC Most | CZE.2 | 33 | 8 | 19 | 27 | 20 | — | — | — | — | — |
| 2016–17 | HC Most | CZE.2 | 38 | 2 | 12 | 14 | 26 | — | — | — | — | — |
| 2017–18 | HC Most | CZE.3 | 12 | 3 | 10 | 13 | 4 | — | — | — | — | — |
| ELH totals | | | 532 | 143 | 263 | 406 | 535 | 55 | 9 | 20 | 29 | 57 |
| DEL totals | | | 133 | 48 | 88 | 136 | 150 | 9 | 2 | 4 | 6 | 4 |
| CZE.2 totals | | | 250 | 46 | 135 | 181 | 165 | 42 | 8 | 33 | 41 | 20 |

=== International ===
| Year | Team | Event | GP | G | A | Pts | PIM |
|---|---|---|---|---|---|---|---|
| 1990 | Czechoslovakia | EJC | 6 | 7 | 3 | 10 | 10 |
| 1992 | Czechoslovakia | WJC | 7 | 0 | 0 | 0 | 0 |
| 1994 | Czech Republic | OG | 6 | 2 | 0 | 2 | 4 |
| Junior totals | | | 13 | 7 | 3 | 10 | 10 |
| Senior totals | | | 6 | 2 | 0 | 2 | 4 |

"Jan Alinc". Elite Prospects.
