= Jiří Vykoukal =

Czech ice hockey player

- Born: March 11, 1971 (age 55) Olomouc, Czechoslovakia
- Height: 5 ft 11 in (180 cm)
- Weight: 187 lb (85 kg; 13 st 5 lb)
- Position: Defence
- Shot: Right
- Played for: HC Sparta Praha; MoDo Hockey; Blues; TPS; HC České Budějovice; HC Plzeň
- National team: Czechoslovakia and Czech Republic
- NHL draft: 208th overall, 1989; Washington Capitals
- Playing career: 1989–2012

Jiří Vykoukal (born March 11, 1971) is a former Czech professional ice hockey defenceman. He was selected by the Washington Capitals in the 10th round (208th overall) of the 1989 NHL entry draft.

Vykoukal played with HC České Budějovice in the Czech Extraliga during the 2010–11 Czech Extraliga season.

== Career statistics ==
=== Regular season and playoffs ===
			Regular season					Playoffs
Season	Team	League	GP	G	A	Pts	PIM	GP	G	A	Pts	PIM
1984–85	TJ DS Olomouc	TCH U18	34	25	14	39	50	—	—	—	—	—
1985–86	TJ DS Olomouc	TCH U18	34	21	31	52		—	—	—	—	—
1986–87	TJ DS Olomouc	TCH U18	33	14	17	31		—	—	—	—	—
1986–87	TJ DS Olomouc	CZE.2		0
1987–88	TJ DS Olomouc	CZE.2		2
1988–89	TJ DS Olomouc	CZE.2	31	10	7	17		—	—	—	—	—
1989–90	TJ Sparta ČKD Praha	TCH	47	5	13	18	28	—	—	—	—	—
1990–91	Baltimore Skipjacks	AHL	60	4	22	26	41	—	—	—	—	—
1991–92	Baltimore Skipjacks	AHL	56	1	21	22	47	—	—	—	—	—
1991–92	Hampton Roads Admirals	ECHL	9	3	9	12	12	—	—	—	—	—
1992–93	Baltimore Skipjacks	AHL	13	3	7	10	12	—	—	—	—	—
1992–93	Hampton Roads Admirals	ECHL	3	1	6	7	0	—	—	—	—	—
1992–93	HC Sparta Praha	TCH	9	2	4	6	10	13	4	2	6	6
1993–94	HC Sparta Praha	ELH	44	6	24	30	32	6	1	5	6	26
1994–95	Modo Hockey	SEL	40	7	6	13	36	—	—	—	—	—
1995–96	HC Sparta Praha	ELH	40	8	22	30	48	11	4	9	13	0
1996–97	HC Sparta Praha	ELH	45	5	22	27	22	10	0	3	3	4
1997–98	HC Sparta Praha	ELH	37	6	20	26	32	11	2	10	12	2
1998–99	Blues	SM-l	46	6	15	21	32	4	0	2	2	18
1999–2000	Blues	SM-l	52	9	26	35	28	4	3	1	4	8
2000–01	Blues	SM-l	31	7	13	20	24	—	—	—	—	—
2001–02	Blues	SM-l	41	9	15	24	34	3	1	0	1	0
2002–03	Blues	SM-l	54	13	25	38	48	7	0	1	1	2
2003–04	TPS	SM-l	49	5	26	31	20	13	0	5	5	2
2004–05	TPS	SM-l	36	3	11	14	34	6	2	1	3	16
2005–06	HC Sparta Praha	ELH	24	0	9	9	26	15	1	3	4	6
2006–07	HC Sparta Praha	ELH	47	9	18	27	66	16	0	7	7	36
2007–08	HC Sparta Praha	ELH	49	3	13	16	72	4	1	1	2	10
2008–09	HC Sparta Praha	ELH	36	5	19	24	52	11	3	8	11	20
2009–10	HC Sparta Praha	ELH	43	6	22	28	38	7	0	3	3	0
2010–11	HC Sparta Praha	ELH	37	0	17	17	22	—	—	—	—	—
2010–11	HC Mountfield	ELH	6	0	3	3	6	6	0	2	2	4
2011–12	HC Plzeň 1929	ELH	26	3	5	8	14	12	1	6	7	16
2019–20	LHK Jestřábi Prostějov	CZE.2	2	0	1	1	2	—	—	—	—	—
ELH totals			434	51	194	245	430	109	13	57	70	124
SM-l totals			309	52	131	183	220	37	6	10	16	46

=== International ===
Year	Team	Event	GP	G	A	Pts	PIM
1987	Czechoslovakia	EJC
1988	Czechoslovakia	EJC
1989	Czechoslovakia	WJC	7	0	2	2	16
1989	Czechoslovakia	EJC
1990	Czechoslovakia	WJC	7	0	6	6	4
1994	Czech Republic	OG	8	1	3	4	4
1995	Czech Republic	WC	8	2	1	3	4
1996	Czech Republic	WC	8	0	1	1	0
1996	Czech Republic	WCH	1	0	0	0	2
1997	Czech Republic	WC	8	1	1	2	8
1998	Czech Republic	WC	9	1	1	2	4
1999	Czech Republic	WC	8	0	1	1	8
Senior totals			50	5	8	13	30
