= 2013 (August) Kajotbet Hockey Games =

2013 Kajotbet Hockey Games
Tournament details
- Host countries: Czech Republic; Russia
- Cities: Pardubice; Saint Petersburg
- Venues: 2 (in 2 host cities)
- Dates: 29 August – 1 September 2013
- Teams: 4

Final positions
- Champions: Finland (6th title)
- Runners-up: Russia
- Third place: Sweden
- Fourth place: Czech Republic

Tournament statistics
- Games played: 6
- Goals scored: 19 (3.17 per game)
- Attendance: 34,355 (5,726 per game)
- Scoring leader: (Finland) Jori Lehterä (4 points)

The 2013 August Kajotbet Hockey Games was played between 29 August and 1 September 2013. The Czech Republic, Finland, Sweden and Russia played a round-robin for a total of three games per team and six games in total. Five of the games were played in Pardubice, Czech Republic, and one game in Saint Petersburg, Russia. The tournament was won by Finland. The tournament was part of the 2013–14 Euro Hockey Tour.

== Standings ==
Pos	Team	Pld	W	D	L	GF	GA	GD	Pts
1	Finland	3	3	0	0	10	1	+9	9
2	Russia	3	1	0	2	3	4	−1	3
3	Sweden	3	1	0	2	3	7	−4	3
4	Czech Republic	3	1	0	2	3	7	−4	3

Source: swehockey

== Games ==
All times are local. Pardubice – (Central European Summer Time – UTC+2) Saint Petersburg (Eastern European Summer Time – UTC+3)

29 August 2013; 17:00	Finland	3-1 (1-0, 2-0, 0-1)	Czech Republic	ČEZ Arena, Pardubice; Attendance: 4,360

Game reference

Atte Engren
Goalies
Alexander Salák
Referees:
(Russia) Vyacheslav Bulanov
(Russia) Konstantin Olenin
Linesmen:
(Czech Republic) Petr Blümel
(Czech Republic) Miroslav Lhotsky

17:09 – Jori Lehterä (Sami Lepistö, Sakari Salminen) (PP)	1-0
25:51 – Pekka Jormakka (Mikko Kousa, Teemu Ramstedt)	2-0
29:18 – Jori Lehterä	3-0
	3-1	52:29 – Zbyněk Irgl (Roman Červenka, Petr Zámorský)

41 min
Penalties
31 min
24
Shots
41

29 August 2013; 18:30	Russia	2-0 (0-0, 0-0, 2-0)	Sweden	VTB Ice Palace, Saint Petersburg; Attendance: 12,000

Game reference
Vasily Koshechkin	Goalies	Henrik Karlsson	Referees: (Finland) Antti Boman (Finland) Mikko Kaukokari; Linesmen: (Finland) Yuri Ivanov (Finland) Alexander Nesterov
47:13 – Evgeny Kuznetsov (Nikita Pivtsakin, Vasily Koshechkin) / 1-0; 59:11 – Egor Averin (Sergei Plotnikov, Mikhail Varnakov) / 2-0			Referees: (Finland) Antti Boman (Finland) Mikko Kaukokari; Linesmen: (Finland) Yuri Ivanov (Finland) Alexander Nesterov
29 min	Penalties	35 min	Referees: (Finland) Antti Boman (Finland) Mikko Kaukokari; Linesmen: (Finland) Yuri Ivanov (Finland) Alexander Nesterov
27	Shots	26	Referees: (Finland) Antti Boman (Finland) Mikko Kaukokari; Linesmen: (Finland) Yuri Ivanov (Finland) Alexander Nesterov

31 August 2013; 13:00	Russia	0-2 (0-1, 0-1, 0-0)	Finland	ČEZ Arena, Pardubice; Attendance: 2,405

Game reference
Stanislav Galinov	Goalies	Mikko Koskinen	Referees: (Czech Republic) Martin Frano (Czech Republic) Pavel Hodek; Linesmen: (Czech Republic) Petr Blümel (Czech Republic) Rudolf Tosenovjan
0-1 / 07:17 – Sakari Salminen (Toni Koivisto); 0-2 / 29:04 – Pekka Jormakka			Referees: (Czech Republic) Martin Frano (Czech Republic) Pavel Hodek; Linesmen: (Czech Republic) Petr Blümel (Czech Republic) Rudolf Tosenovjan
12 min	Penalties	22 min	Referees: (Czech Republic) Martin Frano (Czech Republic) Pavel Hodek; Linesmen: (Czech Republic) Petr Blümel (Czech Republic) Rudolf Tosenovjan
17	Shots	23	Referees: (Czech Republic) Martin Frano (Czech Republic) Pavel Hodek; Linesmen: (Czech Republic) Petr Blümel (Czech Republic) Rudolf Tosenovjan

31 August 2013; 17:00	Czech Republic	0-3 (0-2, 0-0, 0-1)	Sweden	ČEZ Arena, Pardubice; Attendance: 4,518

Game reference

Kovar, Jakub
Goalies
Henrik Karlsson
Referees:
(Russia) Vyacheslav Bulanov
(Russia) Konstantin Olenin
Linesmen:
(Czech Republic) Jiří Gebauer
(Czech Republic) Vit Lederer

0-1	10:37 – Per Åslund (Simon Hjalmarsson) (PP)
0-2	16:26 – Per Åslund (Simon Hjalmarsson) (PP)
-03	58:17 – Niklas Persson

6 min
Penalties
6 min
40
Shots
26

1 September 2013; 13:00	Sweden	0-5 (0-1, 0-3, 0-1)	Finland	ČEZ Arena, Pardubice; Attendance: 3,757

Game reference

Linus Ullmark
Goalies
Atte Engren
Referees:
(Czech Republic) Jan Hribik
(Czech Republic) Antonin Jerabek
Linesmen:
(Czech Republic) Jiri Gebauer
(Czech Republic) Vit Lederer

0-1	10:31 – Leo Komarov (Jarno Koskiranta, Velli-Matti Savinainen)
0-2	21:39 – Oskar Osala (PP)
0-3	33:31 – Sakari Salminen (Jori Lehterä, Sami Lepistö)
0-4	37:15 – Pekka Jormakka (Teemu Ramstedt)
0-5	58:58 – Oskar Osala (Sami Lepistö, Jori Lehterä)

35 min
Penalties
35 min
26
Shots
36

1 September 2013; 18:00	Czech Republic	2-1 (0-0, 1-1, 1-0)	Russia	ČEZ Arena, Pardubice; Attendance: 7,315

Game reference
Jakub Kovář	Goalies	Vasily Koshechkin	Referees: (Sweden) Mikael Sjöqvist (Sweden) Morgan Johansson; Linesmen: (Czech Republic) Petr Blümel (Czech Republic) Rudolf Tosenovjan
23:35 – Roman Červenka (Jan Kovář) / 1-0; 53:15 – Jakub Petružálek / 1-1 ( 2-1 / 39:45 – Egor Averin (Mikhail Varnakov)			Referees: (Sweden) Mikael Sjöqvist (Sweden) Morgan Johansson; Linesmen: (Czech Republic) Petr Blümel (Czech Republic) Rudolf Tosenovjan
10 min	Penalties	10 min	Referees: (Sweden) Mikael Sjöqvist (Sweden) Morgan Johansson; Linesmen: (Czech Republic) Petr Blümel (Czech Republic) Rudolf Tosenovjan
31	Shots	21	Referees: (Sweden) Mikael Sjöqvist (Sweden) Morgan Johansson; Linesmen: (Czech Republic) Petr Blümel (Czech Republic) Rudolf Tosenovjan

== Scoring leaders ==
Pos	Player	Country	GP	G	A	Pts	+/−	PIM	POS
1	Jori Lehterä	Finland	3	2	2	4	+2	0	CE
2	Pekka Jormakka	Finland	3	3	0	3	+3	4	RW
3	Sakari Salminen	Finland	3	2	1	3	+3	0	LW
4	Sami Lepistö	Finland	3	0	3	3	+3	2	LD
5	Egor Averin	Russia	3	2	0	2	+3	0	LW

GP = Games played; G = Goals; A = Assists; Pts = Points; +/− = Plus/minus; PIM = Penalties in minutes; POS = Position
Source: swehockey

== Goaltending leaders ==
Pos	Player	Country	TOI	GA	GAA	Sv%	SO
1	Atte Engren	Finland	120:00	1	0.50	98.51	1
2	Henrik Karlsson	Sweden	120:00	2	1.00	97.01	1
3	Vasily Koshechkin	Russia	119:13	2	1.01	96.49	1
4	Jakub Kovář	Czech Republic	120:00	4	2.00	91.49	0

TOI = Time on ice (minutes:seconds); SA = Shots against; GA = Goals against; GAA = Goals Against Average; Sv% = Save percentage; SO = Shutouts
Source: swehockey
