= 2013 (April) Kajotbet Hockey Games =

2013 Kajotbet Hockey Games
Tournament details
- Host countries: Czech Republic; Sweden
- Cities: Brno; Jönköping
- Venues: 2 (in 2 host cities)
- Dates: 25–28 April 2013
- Teams: 4

Final positions
- Champions: Sweden (3rd title)
- Runners-up: Russia
- Third place: Czech Republic
- Fourth place: Finland

Tournament statistics
- Games played: 6
- Goals scored: 21 (3.5 per game)
- Attendance: 33,312 (5,552 per game)
- Scoring leader(s): (Russia) Sergei Mozyakin (Russia) Kirill Petrov (3 points)

The 2013 April Kajotbet Hockey Games was played between 25 and 28 April 2013. The Czech Republic, Finland, Sweden and Russia played a round-robin for a total of three games per team and six games in total. Five of the games were played in Brno, Czech Republic, and one game in Jönköping, Sweden. The tournament was won by Sweden. The tournament was part of the 2012–13 Euro Hockey Tour.

== Standings ==
Pos	Team	Pld	W	OTW	OTL	L	GF	GA	GD	Pts
1	Sweden	3	3	0	0	0	7	3	+4	9
2	Russia	3	1	1	0	1	6	6	0	5
3	Czech Republic	3	1	0	0	2	4	5	−1	3
4	Finland	3	0	0	1	2	4	7	−3	1

Source: swehockey

== Games ==
All times are local. Pardubice and Jönköping – (Central European Summer Time – UTC+2)

25 April 2013; 18:00	Finland	2-3 (0-0, 1-2, 1-1)	Czech Republic	Kajot Arena, Brno; Attendance: 5,846

Game reference

Joni Ortio
Goalies
Jakub Kovář
Referees:
(Russia) Alexey Anisimov
(Russia) Alexander Sergeev
Linesmen:
(Czech Republic) Jiří Gebauer
(Czech Republic) Vít Lederer

	0-1	26:06 – Petr Hubáček (Jiří Novotný)
	0-2	26:59 – Petr Tenkrát (Tomáš Hertl, Jakub Nakládal)
28:35 – Janne Pesonen (Juhamatti Aaltonen)	1-2
45:15 – Ville Viitaluoma (Sakari Salminen)	2-2
	2-3	46:31 – Zbyněk Irgl (Petr Hubáček)

4 min
Penalties
8 min
28
Shots
26

25 April 2013; 19:00	Sweden	4-2 (1-0, 3-2, 0-0)	Russia	Kinnarps Arena, Jönköping; Attendance: 5,282

Game reference

Johan Backlund
Goalies
Vasily Koshechkin
Referees:
(Finland) Tom Laaksonen
(Finland) Stefan Fonselius
Linesmen:
(Sweden) Johannes Käck
(Sweden) Jimmy Dahmén

09:50 – Nicklas Danielsson (Johan Fransson) (PP)	1-0
20:18 – Niklas Persson (Staffan Kronwall, Robert Rosén) (PP)	2-0
24:49 – Dick Axelsson	3-0
28:28 – Linus Omark (Staffan Kronwall)	4-0
	4-1	32:42 – Sergei Mozyakin (Kirill Petrov, Yevgeny Biryukov) (PP)
	4-2	35:42 – Alexander Svitov (Sergei Soin, Sergei Mozyakin)

12 min
Penalties
10 min
33
Shots
22

27 April 2013; 14:00	Czech Republic	0-1 (0-1, 0-0, 0-0)	Sweden	Kajot Arena, Brno; Attendance: 5,932

Game reference
Alexander Salák	Goalies	Johan Gustafsson	Referees: (Russia) Alexey Anisimov (Russia) Alexander Sergeev; Linesmen: (Czech Republic) Jiří Gebauer (Czech Republic) Vít Lederer
0-1 / 18:19 – Pär Arlbrandt (Andreas Jämtin, Simon Hjalmarsson)			Referees: (Russia) Alexey Anisimov (Russia) Alexander Sergeev; Linesmen: (Czech Republic) Jiří Gebauer (Czech Republic) Vít Lederer
16 min	Penalties	10 min	Referees: (Russia) Alexey Anisimov (Russia) Alexander Sergeev; Linesmen: (Czech Republic) Jiří Gebauer (Czech Republic) Vít Lederer
30	Shots	28	Referees: (Russia) Alexey Anisimov (Russia) Alexander Sergeev; Linesmen: (Czech Republic) Jiří Gebauer (Czech Republic) Vít Lederer

27 April 2013; 18:00	Russia	2-1 GWS (0-1, 0-0, 1-0) (OT: 0–0) (SO: 1–0)	Finland	Kajot Arena, Brno; Attendance: 3,826

Game reference
Vasily Koshechkin	Goalies	Joni Ortio	Referees: (Czech Republic) Jan Hribik (Czech Republic) Vladimír Šindler; Linesmen: (Czech Republic) Petr Blümel (Czech Republic) Tomas Pesek
/ 0-1 / 05:08 – Juha-Pekka Hytönen (Janne Pesonen); 40:48 – Alexei Tereshchenko (Kirill Petrov) / 1-1			Referees: (Czech Republic) Jan Hribik (Czech Republic) Vladimír Šindler; Linesmen: (Czech Republic) Petr Blümel (Czech Republic) Tomas Pesek
Sergei MozyakinMozyakin; Perezhogin (miss)	Shootout	(miss) Salminen; (miss) Haataja; (miss) Hagman	Referees: (Czech Republic) Jan Hribik (Czech Republic) Vladimír Šindler; Linesmen: (Czech Republic) Petr Blümel (Czech Republic) Tomas Pesek
8 min	Penalties	6 min	Referees: (Czech Republic) Jan Hribik (Czech Republic) Vladimír Šindler; Linesmen: (Czech Republic) Petr Blümel (Czech Republic) Tomas Pesek
27	Shots	26	Referees: (Czech Republic) Jan Hribik (Czech Republic) Vladimír Šindler; Linesmen: (Czech Republic) Petr Blümel (Czech Republic) Tomas Pesek

28 April 2013; 14:00	Sweden	2-1 (1-1, 1-0, 0-0)	Finland	Kajot Arena, Brno; Attendance: 5,226

Game reference

Joacim Eriksson
Goalies
Atte Engren
Referees:
(Czech Republic) Milan Minar
(Czech Republic) Vladimír Šindler
Linesmen:
(Czech Republic) Petr Blümel
(Czech Republic) Tomas Pesek

	0-1	10:19 – Sakari Salminen (Juha-Pekka Haataja, Ville Viitaluoma)
16:27 – Jimmie Ericsson (Elias Fälth, Johan Fransson)	1-1
30:32 – Nicklas Danielsson (Calle Järnkrok, Niklas Persson)	2-1

12 min
Penalties
20 min
39
Shots
22

28 April 2013; 18:00	Czech Republic	1-2 (1-0, 0-2, 0-0)	Russia	Kajot Arena, Brno; Attendance: 7,200

Game reference

Alexander Salák
Goalies
Konstantin Barulin
Referees:
(Sweden) Mikael Nord
(Sweden) Mikael Sjöqvist
Linesmen:
(Czech Republic) Jiří Gebauer
(Czech Republic) Vít Lederer

04:20 – Ivan Rachůnek (Petr Koukal, Tomáš Rachůnek)	1-0
	1-1	23:24 – Yegor Averin (Evgeny Kuznetsov)
	1-2	39:54 – Kirill Petrov (PP)

10 min
Penalties
16 min
23
Shots
22

== Scoring leaders ==
Pos	Player	Country	GP	G	A	Pts	+/−	PIM	POS
1	Sergei Mozyakin	Russia	3	2	1	3	+2	0	CE
2	Kirill Petrov	Russia	3	1	2	3	+1	4	RW
3	Nicklas Danielsson	Sweden	3	2	0	2	+1	0	LW
4	Janne Pesonen	Finland	2	1	1	2	+2	0	RW
4	Petr Hubáček	Czech Republic	2	1	1	2	+2	0	LW
4	Niklas Persson	Sweden	2	1	1	2	+2	0	RW

GP = Games played; G = Goals; A = Assists; Pts = Points; +/− = Plus/minus; PIM = Penalties in minutes; POS = Position
Source: swehockey

== Goaltending leaders ==
Pos	Player	Country	TOI	GA	GAA	Sv%	SO
1	Vasily Koshechkin	Russia	95:34	1	0.63	97.78	0
2	Alexander Salák	Czech Republic	119:16	3	1.51	94.00	0
3	Joni Ortio	Finland	119:13	4	1.92	92.31	0
4	Konstantin Barulin	Russia	88:28	5	3.39	86.49	0

TOI = Time on ice (minutes:seconds); SA = Shots against; GA = Goals against; GAA = Goals Against Average; Sv% = Save percentage; SO = Shutouts
Source: swehockey
