= 2008 Czech Hockey Games =

Tournament details
- Host countries: Czech Republic; Russia
- Cities: Liberec; Moscow
- Venues: 2 (in 2 host cities)
- Dates: 17 – 20 April 2008
- Teams: 4

Final positions
- Champions: Russia (3rd title)
- Runners-up: Czech Republic
- Third place: Finland
- Fourth place: Sweden

Tournament statistics
- Games played: 6
- Goals scored: 32 (5.33 per game)
- Attendance: 27,034 (4,506 per game)
- Scoring leader(s): (Czech Republic) Ladislav Kohn (Sweden) Karl Fabricius (4 points)

Awards
- MVP: (Czech Republic) Josef Straka

The 2008 Czech Hockey Games was played between 17 and 20 April 2008. The Czech Republic, Finland, Sweden and Russia played a round-robin for a total of three games per team and six games in total. Five of the matches were played in Tipsport Arena in Liberec, Czech Republic, and one match in Tampere Ice Stadium in Tampere, Finland. The tournament was won by Russia. The tournament was part of 2007–08 Euro Hockey Tour.

== Standings ==
Pos	Team	Pld	W	OTW	OTL	L	GF	GA	GD	Pts
1	Russia	3	3	0	0	0	11	5	+6	9
2	Czech Republic	3	1	1	0	1	9	7	+2	5
3	Finland	3	0	1	1	1	5	8	−3	3
4	Sweden	3	0	0	1	2	7	12	−5	1

Source: swehockey

== Games ==
All times are local. Liberec – (Central European Summer Time – UTC+1) Moscow – (Eastern European Summer Time – UTC+2)

17 April 2008; 17:30	Sweden	3-5 (0-2, 2-1, 1-2)	Czech Republic	Tipsport Arena, Liberec; Attendance: 3,649

Game reference

Erik Ersberg
Goalies
Milan Hnilička

	0-1	14:39 – Josef Straka (Aleš Kotalík, Ondřej Veselý)
	0-2	15:40 – Tomáš Rolinek (Zbyněk Irgl, Ladislav Kohn)
26:46 – Anton Strålman (Karl Fabricius, Niclas Wallin) (PP)	1-2
	1-3	27:18 – Ladislav Kohn (Tomáš Rolinek, Zbyněk Irgl)
32:41 – Karl Fabricius (Patric Hörnqvist)	2-3
41:55 – Daniel Widing (Niclas Wallin, Linus Videll)	3-3
	3-4	52:07 – Ondřej Veselý (Leoš Čermák, [[]])

16 min
Penalties
16 min
38
Shots
30

17 April 2008; 18:30	Russia	4-1 (0-1, 1-0, 3-0)	Finland	VTB Ice Palace, Moscow; Attendance: 6,500

Game reference

Alexander Yeryomenko
Goalies
Sinuhe Wallinheimo

	0-1	05:52 – Esa Pirnes (Riku Hahl)
21:18 – Konstantin Gorovikov (PP)	1-1
44:04 – Sergei Zinovjev (Danis Zaripov, Ilya Nikulin) (PP)	2-1
46:20 – Ilya Nikulin (Danis Zaripov, Alexei Morozov)	3-1
48:55 – Evgeny Artyukhin (Maxim Afinogenov)	4-1

39 min
Penalties
14 min
33
Shots
17

19 April 2008; 12:00	Russia	4-2 (1-0, 1-1, 2-1)	Sweden	Tipsport Arena, Liberec; Attendance: 1,489

Game reference

Semyon Varlamov
Goalies
Johan Backlund

11:32 – Ilya Nikulin (Evgeny Medvedev) (PP)	1-0
	1-1	26:23 – Anton Strålman (Kenny Jönsson, Karl Fabricius) (PP)
33:57 – Andrei Kuteikin (Dmitry Vorobyov) (PP)	2-1
	2-2	42:41 – Nils Ekman (Robert Nilsson) (PP)
56:17 – Danis Zaripov (Sergei Zinovyev, Alexei Morozov) (PP)	3-2
59:23 – Fedor Fedorov (Nikolay Kulemin)	4-2

18 min
Penalties
16 min
30
Shots
22

19 April 2008; 16:00	Czech Republic	2-1 GWS (0-1, 1-0, 0-0) (OT: 0–0) (SO: 1–0)	Finland	Tipsport Arena, Liberec; Attendance: 7,169

Game reference
Milan Hnilička	Goalies	Karri Rämö
/ 0-1 / 11:03 – Jarkko Immonen (Hannes Hyvönen, Janne Pesonen) (PP); 33:13 – Josef Straka (Tomáš Kaberle) (PP) / 1-1
Čermák (miss); Vrbata; Irgl (miss); Kaberle (miss); Vrbata	Shootout	(miss) Hyvönen; Pirnes; (miss) Immonen; (miss) Pirnes; (miss) Hyvönen
12 min	Penalties	18 min
29	Shots	18

20 April 2008; 12:00	Finland	3-2 OT (0-0, 1-1, 1-1) (OT: 1–0)	Sweden	Tipsport Arena, Liberec; Attendance: 1,039

Game reference

Petri Vehanen
Goalies
Erik Ersberg

23:18 – Mika Pyörälä (Riku Hahl) (PP)	1-0
	1-1	33:29 – Patric Hörnqvist (Karl Fabricius, Michael Holmqvist)
	1-2	53:44 – Nils Ekman
59:19 – Janne Pesonen (Hannes Hyvönen, Jarkko Immonen)	2-2
62:09 – Esa Pirnes (Anssi Salmela, Toni Koivisto)	3-2

22 min
Penalties
12 min
21
Shots
39

20 April 2008; 16:00	Czech Republic	2-3 (1-0, 0-3, 1-0)	Russia	Tipsport Arena, Liberec; Attendance: 7,188

Game reference

Marek Pinc
Goalies
Mikhail Biryukov

12:48 – Petr Čáslava (Tomáš Rolinek, Ladislav Kohn)	1-0
	1-1	23:39 – Alexei Tereshchenko (Alexei Morozov)
	1-2	26:35 – Evgeny Artyukhin (Dmitri Kalinin) (PP)
	1-3	29:16 – Sergei Mozyakin (Maxim Sushinsky, Konstantin Gorovikov)
46:07 – Peter Jánský (Ladislav Kohn)	2-3

24 min
Penalties
10 min
23
Shots
25

== Scoring leaders ==
Pos	Player	Country	GP	G	A	Pts	+/−	PIM	POS
1	Ladislav Kohn	Czech Republic	3	1	3	4	+5	2	FW
2	Karl Fabricius	Sweden	3	1	3	4	+2	2	DF
3	Ilya Nikulin	Russia	3	2	1	3	+2	0	FW
4	Tomáš Rolinek	Czech Republic	3	1	2	3	+4	2	FW
5	Danis Zaripov	Russia	3	1	2	3	+3	2	FW

GP = Games played; G = Goals; A = Assists; Pts = Points; +/− = Plus/minus; PIM = Penalties in minutes; POS = Position
Source: swehockey

== Goaltending leaders ==
Pos	Player	Country	TOI	GA	GAA	Sv%	SO
1	Milan Hnilička	Czech Republic	125:00	4	1.92	92.56	0
2	Erik Ersberg	Sweden	122:01	7	3.44	86.00	0

TOI = Time on ice (minutes:seconds); SA = Shots against; GA = Goals against; GAA = Goals Against Average; Sv% = Save percentage; SO = Shutouts
Source: swehockey

== Tournament awards ==
The tournament directorate named the following players in the tournament 2008:

- Best goalkeeper: (Czech Republic) Milan Hnilička
- Best defenceman: (Russia) Ilya Nikulin
- Best forward: (Russia) Danis Zaripov
- Most Valuable Player: (Czech Republic) Josef Straka
