= 2009 (April) Czech Hockey Games =

2009 Czech Hockey Games (April)
Tournament details
- Host countries: Czech Republic; Finland
- Cities: Liberec; Tampere
- Venues: 2 (in 2 host cities)
- Dates: 16–19 April 2009
- Teams: 4

Final positions
- Champions: Russia (4th title)
- Runners-up: Czech Republic
- Third place: Finland
- Fourth place: Sweden

Tournament statistics
- Games played: 6
- Goals scored: 41 (6.83 per game)
- Attendance: 24,372 (4,062 per game)
- Scoring leader: (Russia) Alexander Radulov (6 points)

The 2009 April Czech Hockey Games was played between 16 and 19 April 2009. The Czech Republic, Finland, Sweden and Russia played a round-robin for a total of three games per team and six games in total. Five of the matches were played in Tipsport Arena in Liberec, Czech Republic, and one match in Tampere Ice Stadium in Tampere, Finland. The tournament was won by Russia. The tournament was part of 2008–09 Euro Hockey Tour.

== Standings ==
Pos	Team	Pld	W	OTW	OTL	L	GF	GA	GD	Pts
1	Russia	3	2	0	0	1	12	10	+2	6
2	Czech Republic	3	1	1	0	1	9	8	+1	5
3	Finland	3	1	0	2	0	11	11	0	5
4	Sweden	3	0	1	0	2	9	12	−3	2

Source: swehockey

== Games ==
All times are local. Liberec – (Central European Summer Time – UTC+1) Tampere – (Eastern European Summer Time – UTC+2)

16 April 2009; 18:00	Sweden	1-2 (0-0, 1-1, 0-1)	Czech Republic	Tipsport Arena, Liberec; Attendance: 3,809

Game reference

Stefan Liv
Goalies
Jakub Štěpánek

	0-1	32:33 – Petr Čajánek (Jaromír Jágr, Jakub Klepiš)
38:18 – Christian Berglund (Christian Wallin, Niklas Nordgren)	1-1
	1-2	54:54 – Jaromír Jágr (Miroslav Blaťák)

12 min
Penalties
14 min
24
Shots
21

16 April 2009; 18:30	Finland	4-2 (1-0, 0-2, 3-0)	Russia	Tampere Ice Stadium, Tampere; Attendance: 6,265

Game reference

Juuso Riksman
Goalies
Alexander Yeryomenko

17:20 – Kalle Kerman (Mikko Lehtonen)	1-0
	1-1	34:06 – Sergei Mozyakin (SHG)
	1-2	39:52 – Alexander Radulov (Konstantin Gorovikov, Oleg Saprykin)
42:03 – Toni Kähkönen (Leo Komarov)	2-2
48:29 – Hannes Hyvönen (Kim Hirschovits, Janne Niskala) (PP)	3-2
55:50 – Hannes Hyvönen (Ville Vahalahti, Kim Hirschovits)	4-2

8 min
Penalties
14 min
32
Shots
26

18 April 2009; 14:00	Finland	4-5 OT (1-2, 2-2, 1-0) (OT: 0–1)	Sweden	Tipsport Arena, Liberec; Attendance: 2,096

Game reference

Iiro Tarkki
Goalies
Johan Holmqvist

	0-1	06:33 – Martin Thörnberg (Linus Omark, Johan Harju)
06:49 – Kalle Kerman (Jussi Makkonen) (PP)	1-1
	1-2	16:23 – Kenny Jönsson (Johan Åkerman) (PP)
	1-3	22:23 – Marcus Nilson (Magnus Johansson)
23:54 – Petteri Nummelin (Kim Hirschovits, Tommi Santala) (PP)	2-3
	2-4	27:52 – Martin Thörnberg (Linus Omark, Kenny Jönsson) (PP)
28:39 – Janne Niinimaa (Jussi Makkonen, Kalle Kerman)	3-4
40:58 – Kalle Kerman (Petteri Nummelin, Ville Vahalahti) (PP)	4-4
	4-5	64:45 – Rickard Wallin (Martin Thörnberg)

18 min
Penalties
18 min
23
Shots
33

18 April 2009; 18:00	Czech Republic	3-4 (1-2, 1-1, 1-1)	Russia	Tipsport Arena, Liberec; Attendance: 6,820

Game reference

Jakub Štěpánek
Goalies
Vasily Koshechkin

	0-1	00:36 – Sergei Mozyakin
02:56 – Jan Marek (Ondřej Němec)	1-1
	1-2	11:09 – Oleg Tverdovsky (Oleg Saprykin, Alexander Radulov)
23:07 – Jakub Klepiš (Jaromír Jágr)	2-2
	2-3	27:47 – Alexei Tereshchenko (Igor Makarov, Maxim Rybin)
	2-4	47:40 – Petr Schastlivy (Igor Makarov, Evgenii Dadonov)
59:07 – Jakub Klepiš (Jaromír Jágr, Roman Červenka)	3-4

81 min
Penalties
69 min
25
Shots
29

19 April 2009; 13:00	Russia	6-3 (2-0, 2-1, 2-2)	Sweden	Tipsport Arena, Liberec; Attendance: 1,144

Game reference

Alexander Yeryomenko
Goalies
Stefan Liv

01:02 – Alexander Radulov (Oleg Saprykin, Konstantin Gorovikov)	1-0
18:03 – Oleg Saprykin (Alexander Radulov)	2-0
	2-1	33:55 – Niklas Persson (Johan Åkerman, Marcus Nilsson)
35:33 – Sergei Zinovyev (Maxim Sushinsky, Sergei Mozyakin)	3-1
39:35 – Oleg Saprykin (Alexander Radulov, Konstantin Gorovikov)	4-1
	4-2	45:17 – Niklas Persson (Christian Berglund, Marcus Nilson)
	4-3	48:59 – Johan Åkerman (Linus Omark, Johan Harju) (PP)
53:48 – Alexander Radulov	5-3
56:03 – Sergei Mozyakin (Vitaly Atyushov)	6-3

30 min
Penalties
14 min
39
Shots
32

19 April 2009; 17:00	Czech Republic	4-3 OT (2-2, 0-0, 1-1) (OT: 0–1)	Finland	Tipsport Arena, Liberec; Attendance: 4,238

Game reference

Miroslav Kopřiva
Goalies
Juuso Riksman

03:29 – Jan Marek (Roman Červenka)	1-0
09:07 – Jan Marek (Michal Barinka) (SHG)	2-0
	2-1	09:23 – Kim Hirschovits (Hannes Hyvönen) (PP)
	2-2	15:49 – Pekka Saravo (Toni Kähkönen)
45:57 – František Lukeš (Zdeněk Kutlák)	3-2
	3-3	46:22 – Hannes Hyvönen (Kim Hirschovits)
60:39 – Jakub Klepiš (Jaromír Jágr)	4-3

6 min
Penalties
6 min
37
Shots
34

== Scoring leaders ==
Pos	Player	Country	GP	G	A	Pts	+/−	PIM	POS
1	Alexander Radulov	Russia	3	3	3	6	+4	4	CE
2	Oleg Saprykin	Russia	3	2	3	5	+3	14	CE
3	Jaromír Jágr	Czech Republic	3	1	4	5	+2	0	RW
4	Kim Hirschovits	Finland	3	1	4	5	+2	2	CE
5	Hannes Hyvönen	Sweden	3	3	1	4	-1	2	RW

GP = Games played; G = Goals; A = Assists; Pts = Points; +/− = Plus/minus; PIM = Penalties in minutes; POS = Position
Source: swehockey

== Goaltending leaders ==
Pos	Player	Country	TOI	GA	GAA	Sv%	SO
1	Jakub Štěpánek	Czech Republic	120:00	5	2.50	90.57	0
2	Juuso Riksman	Finland	120:00	6	3.00	90.48	0
3	Alexander Yeryomenko	Russia	119:37	7	3.51	89.06	0
4	Stefan Liv	Sweden	119:04	8	4.03	86.67	0

TOI = Time on ice (minutes:seconds); SA = Shots against; GA = Goals against; GAA = Goals Against Average; Sv% = Save percentage; SO = Shutouts
Source: swehockey

== Tournament awards ==
The tournament directorate named the following players in the tournament 2009 (April):

- Best goalkeeper: (Czech Republic) Jakub Štěpánek
- Best defenceman: (Finland) Janne Niinimaa
- Best forward: (Russia) Sergei Mozyakin
