= 2013–14 Euro Hockey Tour =

Tournament details
- Dates: 29 August 2013 – 4 May 2014
- Teams: 4

Final positions
- Champions: Finland (8th title)
- Runners-up: Russia
- Third place: Czech Republic
- Fourth place: Sweden

Tournament statistics
- Games played: 24
- Goals scored: 101 (4.21 per game)
- Attendance: 169,454 (7,061 per game)
- Scoring leader: (Finland) Jori Lehterä (7 points)

The 2013–14 Euro Hockey Tour was the 18th season of Euro Hockey Tour. It started on 29 August 2013 and ended on 4 May 2014. A total of 24 games were played, with each team playing 12 games. The season consisted of the Kajotbet Hockey Games, Karjala Tournament, the Channel One Cup and the Oddset Hockey Games.

== Standings ==
Pos	Team	Pld	W	OTW	OTL	L	GF	GA	GD	Pts
1	Finland	12	8	2	1	1	33	19	+14	29
2	Russia	12	5	0	0	7	26	21	+5	15
3	Czech Republic	12	4	1	1	6	16	31	−15	15
4	Sweden	12	3	1	2	6	26	30	−4	13

Source: eurohockey

== Kajotbet Hockey Games ==
The 2013 Kajotbet Hockey Games were played from 29 August to 1 September 2013, and was won by Finland. Five of the matches were played in Pardubice, Czech Republic and one in Saint Petersburg, Russia.

Pos	Team	Pld	W	D	L	GF	GA	GD	Pts
1	Finland	3	3	0	0	10	1	+9	9
2	Russia	3	1	0	2	3	4	−1	3
3	Sweden	3	1	0	2	3	7	−4	3
4	Czech Republic	3	1	0	2	3	7	−4	3

Source: swehockey

29 August 2013
Finland	3–1	Czech Republic
Russia	2–0	Sweden
31 August 2013
Russia	0–2	Finland
Czech Republic	0–3	Sweden
1 September 2013
Sweden	0–5	Finland
Czech Republic	2–1	Russia

== Karjala Tournament ==
The 2013 Karjala Tournament was played from 7 to 10 November 2013, and was won by Finland. Five of the matches were played in Helsinki, Finland, and one match in Gävle, Sweden.

Pos	Team	Pld	W	OTW	OTL	L	GF	GA	GD	Pts
1	Finland	3	2	0	1	0	9	8	+1	7
2	Russia	3	2	0	0	1	10	6	+4	6
3	Sweden	3	1	1	0	1	11	7	+4	5
4	Czech Republic	3	0	0	0	3	2	11	−9	0

Source: Swehockey

7 November 2013
Russia	3–4	Finland
Sweden	6–0	Czech Republic
9 November 2013
Sweden	2–5	Russia
Finland	3–2	Czech Republic
10 November 2013
Czech Republic	0–2	Russia
Finland	2–3 (OT)	Sweden

== Channel One Cup ==
The 2013 Channel One Cup was played from 19 to 22 December 2013, and was won by the Czech Republic. Five of the matches were played in Sochi, Russia, and one match in Prague, Czech Republic.

Pos	Team	Pld	W	OTW	OTL	L	GF	GA	GD	Pts
1	Czech Republic	3	2	1	0	0	7	3	+4	8
2	Finland	3	2	0	0	1	7	6	+1	6
3	Russia	3	1	0	0	2	6	7	−1	3
4	Sweden	3	0	0	1	2	6	10	−4	1

Source: eurohockey

19 December 2013
Czech Republic	2–0	Finland
Sweden	2–3	Russia
21 December 2013
Russia	2–3	Finland
Czech Republic	2–1 (GWS)	Sweden
22 December 2013
Russia	1–2	Czech Republic
Finland	4–2	Sweden

== Oddset Hockey Games ==
The 2014 Oddset Hockey Games were played from 1 to 4 May 2014, and was won by Finland. Five of the matches were played in Stockholm, Sweden, and one match in Helsinki, Finland.

Pos	Team	Pld	W	OTW	OTL	L	GF	GA	GD	Pts
1	Finland	3	1	2	0	0	7	4	+3	7
2	Czech Republic	3	1	0	1	1	4	10	−6	4
3	Sweden	3	1	0	1	1	6	6	0	4
4	Russia	3	1	0	0	2	7	4	+3	3

Source: swehockey

1 May 2014
Finland	2–1	Russia
Czech Republic	3–2	Sweden
3 May 2014
Sweden	2–3 (GWS)	Finland
Russia	6–0	Czech Republic
4 May 2014
Finland	2–1 (GWS)	Czech Republic
Sweden	2–0	Russia

== Statistics ==
=== Scoring leaders ===
List shows the top skaters sorted by points, then goals. If the list exceeds 10 skaters because of a tie in points, all of the tied skaters are shown.

Player	Nation	GP	G	A	Pts	PIM	POS
Jori Lehterä	Finland	8	3	4	7	0	C
Pekka Jormakka	Finland	8	5	1	6	4	F
Oscar Möller	Sweden	6	3	3	6	0	F
Egor Averin	Russia	8	4	1	5	0	F
Sakari Salminen	Finland	6	3	2	5	0	F
Viktor Tikhonov	Russia	12	2	3	5	4	F
Simon Hjalmarsson	Sweden	9	2	3	5	0	F
Juuso Hietanen	Finland	9	1	4	5	2	D
Linus Klasen	Sweden	12	4	0	4	2	F
Maxim Chudinov	Russia	11	3	1	4	8	D

GP = Games played; G = Goals; A = Assists; Pts = Points; PIM = Penalties in minutes; POS = Position
positions: F = Forward; RW = Right winger; LW = Left winger; C = Centre; D = Defenceman

=== Leading goaltenders ===
Only the top five goaltenders, based on save percentage, who have played 40% of their team's minutes, are included in this list.

Player	Nation	TOI	SA	GA	GAA	Sv%	SO

TOI = Time on ice (minutes:seconds); SA = Shots against; GA = Goals against; GAA = Goals against average; Sv% = Save percentage; SO = Shutouts

Source: [Source]
Updated: (UTC)
