= 2018 Carlson Hockey Games =

2018 Carlson Hockey Games (Euro Hockey Games)
Tournament details
- Host countries: Czechia; Russia
- Cities: Pardubice; Yaroslavl
- Venues: 2 (in 2 host cities)
- Dates: 19–22 April 2018
- Teams: 4

Final positions
- Champions: Czech Republic (8th title)
- Runners-up: Finland
- Third place: Sweden
- Fourth place: Russia

Tournament statistics
- Games played: 6
- Goals scored: 27 (4.5 per game)
- Attendance: 34,569 (5,762 per game)
- Scoring leader: (Finland) Antti Suomela (4 points)

The 2018 Carlson Hockey Games was played between 19 and 22 April 2018. The Czech Republic, Finland, Sweden and Russia played a round-robin for a total of three games per team and six games in total. Five of the games were played in Pardubice, Czech Republic, and one game in Yaroslavl, Russia. The tournament was won by the Czech Republic. The tournament was part of the 2017–18 Euro Hockey Tour.

== Standings ==
Pos	Team	Pld	W	OTW	OTL	L	GF	GA	GD	Pts
1	Czech Republic	3	3	0	0	0	8	3	+5	9
2	Finland	3	2	0	0	1	10	7	+3	6
3	Sweden	3	1	0	0	2	6	11	−5	3
4	Russia	3	0	0	0	3	3	6	−3	0

Source: Swehockey

== Games ==
All times are local. Pardubice – (Central European Summer Time – UTC+2) Yaroslavl – (Central European Time – UTC+1)

19 April 2018; 19:00	Finland	1–3 (1–1, 0–0, 0–2)	Czech Republic	Tipsport Arena, Pardubice; Attendance: 6,212

Game reference

Eero Kilpeläinen
Goalies
Pavel Francouz
Referees:
(Russia) Yuri Oskirko
(Russia) Alexander Soin
Linesmen:
(Czech Republic) Filip Ondracek
(Czech Republic) Josef Spúr

	0–1	09:05 – Zadina (Sklenička) (PP)
Suomela (Näkyvä) – 11:56	1–1
	1–2	49:33 – Jaškin (Kaut, Sklenička) (PP)
	1–3	59:15 – Nestrašil (EN)

12 min
Penalties
18 min
35
Shots
33

19 April 2018; 20:00	Russia	1–2 (0–1, 1–0, 0–1)	Sweden	Arena 2000, Yaroslavl; Attendance: 9,000

Game reference

Igor Shestyorkin
Vasily Koshechkin
Goalies
Magnus Hellberg
Referees:
(Finland) Aleksi Rantala
(Finland) Mikko Kaukokari
Linesmen:
(Russia) Nikita Vilyugin
(Russia) Dmitry Golovlyov

	0–1	18:04 – Zackrisson (PP)
Dadonov (Byvaltsev, Gusev) (PP) – 22:11	1–1
	1–2	40:41 – Händemark (Wikstrand, Klingberg)

18 min
Penalties
6 min
36
Shots
31

21 April 2018; 14:20	Czech Republic	3–1 (1–1, 0–0, 2–0)	Sweden	Tipsport Arena, Pardubice; Attendance: 6,843

Game reference

Dominik Furch
Goalies
Magnus Hellberg
Referees:
(Russia) Yuri Oskirko
(Russia) Alexander Soin
Linesmen:
(Czech Republic) Jiri Gebauer
(Czech Republic) Vit Lederer

Hanzl (Pyrochta, Nestrašil) (PP) – 03:17	1–0
	1–1	14:25 – Klingberg (Rödin)
Nestrašil (Hanzl, Moravčík) (PP) – 49:23	2–1
Horák (Červenka, Stastny) (EN) – 57:53	3–1

12 min
Penalties
10 min
29
Shots
22

21 April 2018; 18:15	Russia	1–2 (1–0, 0–1, 0–1)	Finland	Tipsport Arena, Pardubice; Attendance: 3,357

Game reference

Igor Shestyorkin
Goalies
Ville Husso
Referees:
(Czech Republic) Jan Hribik
(Czech Republic) Vladimir Pešina
Linesmen:
(Czech Republic) Tomáš Brejcha
(Czech Republic) Rudolf Tošenovjan

Gusev (Byvaltsev) – 07:15	1–0
	1–1	34:39 – Jokiharju (Suomela, Jormakka) (PP)
	1–2	58:02 – Sallinen (Anttila, Pokka)

10 min
Penalties
4 min
30
Shots
20

22 April 2018; 14:20	Czech Republic	2–1 (1–0, 1–0, 0–1)	Russia	Tipsport Arena, Pardubice; Attendance: 6,585

Game reference

David Rittich
Goalies
Vasily Koshechkin
Referees:
(Sweden) Tobias Björk
(Sweden) Mikael Holm
Linesmen:
(Czech Republic) Stanislav Barvir
(Czech Republic) Petr Blümel

Chytil (Zadina) (PP) – 08:36	1–0
Stransky (Tomášek) – 20:14	2–0
	2–1	49:27 – Kruchinin (Mamin, Bereglazov) (PP)

12 min
Penalties
16 min
23
Shots
35

22 April 2018; 18:15	Sweden	3–7 (0–1, 1–2, 2–4)	Finland	Tipsport Arena, Pardubice; Attendance: 2,572

Game reference

Filip Gustavsson
Goalies
Ville Husso
Referees:
(Czech Republic) Martin Frano
(Czech Republic) Robin Sir
Linesmen:
(Czech Republic) Jiri Svoboda
(Czech Republic) Miroslav Lhotský

	0–1	09:21 – Suomela (Vaakanainen, Manninen)
	0–2	20:55 – Palola (Suomela)
Rödin (Andersson, Arnesson) – 27:21	1–2
	1–3	33:21 – Jokiharju (Enlund, Niemi)
	1–4	41:42 – Puustinen (Rajala, Sandell)
Everberg (Jonsson-Fjällby, Ölund) – 48:10	2–4
	2–5	52:37 – Jormakka
Everberg (Jonsson-Fjällby) – 55:36	3–5
	3–6	59:45 – Pokka (Niemi) (SH, EN)
	3–7	59:59 – Sandell (Honka, Sallinen)

4 min
Penalties
2 min
17
Shots
31

== Scoring leaders ==
Pos	Player	Country	GP	G	A	Pts	+/−	PIM	POS
1	Antti Suomela	Finland	3	2 0	2	4	+3	0	F
2	Andrej Nestrašil	Czech Republic	2	2	1	3	+1	0	F
3	Dennis Everberg	Sweden	3	2	0	2	+2	2	F
4	Henri Jokiharju	Finland	3	2	0	2	-1	0	D
5	Nikita Gusev	Russia	2	1	1	2	0	0	F

GP = Games played; G = Goals; A = Assists; Pts = Points; +/− = Plus/minus; PIM = Penalties in minutes; POS = Position
Source: swehockey

== Goaltending leaders ==
Pos	Player	Country	TOI	GA	GAA	Sv%	SO
1	Magnus Hellberg	Sweden	119:31	3	1.51	95.31	0
2	Igor Shesterkin	Russia	117:54	4	2.04	92.16	0
3	Ville Husso	Finland	120:00	4	2.00	91.49	0

TOI = Time on ice (minutes:seconds); SA = Shots against; GA = Goals against; GAA = Goals Against Average; Sv% = Save percentage; SO = Shutouts
Source: swehockey
