= 2017 Czech Hockey Games =

Tournament details
- Host countries: Czechia; Sweden
- Cities: České Budějovice; Stockholm
- Venues: 2 (in 2 host cities)
- Dates: 27–30 April 2017
- Teams: 4

Final positions
- Champions: Czech Republic (7th title)
- Runners-up: Finland
- Third place: Russia
- Fourth place: Sweden

Tournament statistics
- Games played: 6
- Goals scored: 37 (6.17 per game)
- Attendance: 39,700 (6,617 per game)
- Scoring leader: (Czech Republic) Jakub Voráček (5 points)

The 2017 Czech Hockey Games was played between 27 and 30 April 2017. The Czech Republic, Finland, Sweden and Russia played a round-robin for a total of three games per team and six games in total. Five of the games were played in České Budějovice, Czech Republic, and one game in Stockholm, Sweden. The tournament was won by the Czech Republic. The tournament was part of the 2016–17 Euro Hockey Tour

== Standings ==
Pos	Team	Pld	W	OTW	OTL	L	GF	GA	GD	Pts
1	Czech Republic	3	2	0	1	0	14	10	+4	7
2	Finland	3	2	0	0	1	6	5	+1	6
3	Russia	3	0	1	1	1	7	8	−1	3
4	Sweden	3	0	1	0	2	10	14	−4	2

Source: Eurohockey.com

== Games ==
All times are local. České Budějovice and Stockholm – (Central European Summer Time – UTC+2)

27 April 2017; 18:30	Finland	2–3 (2–1, 0–1, 0–1)	Czech Republic	Budvar Arena, České Budějovice; Attendance: 6,205

Game reference

Harri Säteri
Goalies
Petr Mrázek
Referees:
(Russia) Michail Buturlin
(Russia) Roman Gofman
Linesmen:
(Czech Republic) Tomáš Brejcha
(Czech Republic) Libor Suchánek

Pyörälä (Hietanen, Vittasmäki) – 02:55	1–0
Aaltonen (Vittasmäki, Rantanen) – 07:54	2–0
	2–1	14:29 – Červenka (Holík, Voráček)
	2–2	29:48 – Rutta (Kempný) (PP)
	2–3	45:06 – Hanzl (Kašpar)

10 min
Penalties
10 min
29
Shots
39

27 April 2017; 18:30	Sweden	4–3 OT (0–2, 1–1, 2–0); OT: (1–0)	Russia	Hovet, Stockholm; Attendance: 8,094

Game reference

Eddie Läck
Goalies
Andrei Vasilevskiy
Referees:
(Finland) Mikko Kaukokari
(Finland) Kristian Vikman
Linesmen:
(Sweden) Örjan Åhlén
(Norway) Alexander Waldejer

	0–1	07:12 – Mozyakin (Tkachyov)
	0–2	17:33 – Antipin (Tkachyov, Mozyakin)
Lindholm (Rosén, Omark) – 26:45	1–2
	1–3	30:17 – Mozyakin (Tkachyov) (PP)
Klingberg (Landeskog, Söderberg) (PP) – 43:10	2–3
Omark (Rask, Strålman) (PP) – 50:26	3–3
Landeskog (Söderberg) – 64:08	4–3

12 min
Penalties
6 min
20
Shots
25

29 April 2017; 13:00	Russia	0–1 (0–0, 0–0, 0–1)	Finland	Budvar Arena, České Budějovice; Attendance: 6,401

Game reference
Andrei Vasilevskiy	Goalies	Joonas Korpisalo	Referees: (Czech Republic) Oldřich Hejduk (Czech Republic) René Hradil; Linesmen: (Czech Republic) Miroslav Lhotský (Czech Republic) Jiří Svoboda
0–1 / 49:37 – Filppula (Ohtamaa, Honka)			Referees: (Czech Republic) Oldřich Hejduk (Czech Republic) René Hradil; Linesmen: (Czech Republic) Miroslav Lhotský (Czech Republic) Jiří Svoboda
14 min	Penalties	14 min	Referees: (Czech Republic) Oldřich Hejduk (Czech Republic) René Hradil; Linesmen: (Czech Republic) Miroslav Lhotský (Czech Republic) Jiří Svoboda
33	Shots	16	Referees: (Czech Republic) Oldřich Hejduk (Czech Republic) René Hradil; Linesmen: (Czech Republic) Miroslav Lhotský (Czech Republic) Jiří Svoboda

29 April 2017; 17:00	Czech Republic	8–4 (1–2, 3–1, 4–1)	Sweden	Budvar Arena, České Budějovice; Attendance: 6,401

Game reference

Pavel Francouz
Goalies
Eddie Läck
Referees:
(Russia) Michail Buturlin
(Russia) Roman Gofman
Linesmen:
(Czech Republic) Jiří Gebauer
(Czech Republic) Vít Lederer

Kundrátek (Hanzl) – 03:57	1–0
	1–1	17:07 – Kempe (Klingberg)
	1–2	19:15 – Klingberg (Krüger, Ekman-Larsson)
	1–3	28:25 – Landeskog (Klingberg, Ekman-Larsson) (PP)
Birner (Řepík, Krejčík) – 30:39	2–3
Kovář (Kindl, Šulák) (PP) – 36:42	3–3
Šimek (Voráček) – 37:26	4–3
Holík (Kempný, Voráček) – 48:11	5–3
	5–4	54:20 – Klingberg (PP)
Červenka (Voráček, Kovář) (PP2) – 56:31	6–4
Kempný (Voráček, Červenka) (PP) – 58:32	7–4
Šimek (Hanzl) (ENG) – 59:11	8–4

12 min
Penalties
16 min
32
Shots
20

30 April 2017; 14:30	Sweden	2–3 (2–2, 0–0, 0–1)	Finland	Budvar Arena, České Budějovice; Attendance: 6,198

Game reference

Viktor Fasth
Goalies
Joonas Korpisalo
Referees:
(Czech Republic) Pavel Hodek
(Czech Republic) Robin Sir
Linesmen:
(Czech Republic) Jiří Ondráček
(Czech Republic) Rudolf Tošenovjan

	0–1	02:30 – Osala (Hännikäinen, Sallinen)
	0–2	08:12 – Sallinen (Hännikäinen, Osala)
Strålman – 09:20	1–2
Hedman (Omark, Rask) – 19:46	2–2
	2–3	55:52 – Osala (Hietanen, Ohtamaa)

6 min
Penalties
4 min
26
Shots
24

30 April 2017; 18:30	Czech Republic	3–4 GWS (1–0, 1–1, 1–2); OT: (0–0); SO: (0–1)	Russia	Budvar Arena, České Budějovice; Attendance: 6,401

Game reference

Petr Mrázek
Goalies
Ilya Sorokin
Referees:
(Sweden) Tobias Björk
(Sweden) Mikael Andersson
Linesmen:
(Czech Republic) Jiří Gebauer
(Czech Republic) Vít Lederer

Hyka (Šulák) (PP) – 18:07	1–0
	1–1	21:29 – Dadonov (Shipachev)
Vrána (Kovář, Radil) – 24:00	2–1
	2–2	50:58 – Provorov (Telegin)
Kovář (Radil) – 53:12	3–2
	3–3	57:40 – Gusev (Shipachev, Dadonov) (PP)

Zohorna (miss)
Hanzl
Kovář (miss)
Hanzl
Hanzl (miss)
Zohorna (miss)
Kašpar (miss)
Shootout
(miss) Gusev
(miss) Mozyakin
Dadonov
Gusev
(miss) Mozyakin
(miss) Dadonov
Gusev
6 min
Penalties
6 min
24
Shots
16

== Scoring leaders ==
Pos	Player	Country	GP	G	A	Pts	+/−	PIM	POS
1	Jakub Voráček	Czech Republic	2	0	5	5	+3	2	F
2	John Klingberg	Sweden	2	2	2	4	+1	4	D
3	Jan Kovář	Czech Republic	3	2	2	4	+1	2	F
4	Sergei Mozyakin	Russia	2	2	1	3	+1	0	F
5	Roman Červenka	Czech Republic	2	2	1	3	+3	2	F

GP = Games played; G = Goals; A = Assists; Pts = Points; +/− = Plus/minus; PIM = Penalties in minutes; POS = Position
Source: swehockey

== Goaltending leaders ==
Pos	Player	Country	TOI	GA	GAA	Sv%	SO
1	Joonas Korpisalo	Finland	120:00	2	1.00	96.61	1
2	Petr Mrázek	Czech Republic	125:00	5	2.40	88.64	0
3	Andrei Vasilevskiy	Russia	123:14	5	2.43	86.11	0
4	Eddie Läck	Sweden	123:49	10	4.85	82.14	0

TOI = Time on ice (minutes:seconds); SA = Shots against; GA = Goals against; GAA = Goals Against Average; Sv% = Save percentage; SO = Shutouts
Source: swehockey
