= 2011 Czech Hockey Games =

Tournament details
- Host countries: Czech Republic; Sweden
- Cities: Brno; Malmö
- Venues: 2 (in 2 host cities)
- Dates: 21–24 April 2011
- Teams: 4

Final positions
- Champions: Czech Republic (6th title)
- Runners-up: Russia
- Third place: Finland
- Fourth place: Sweden

Tournament statistics
- Games played: 6
- Attendance: 41,816 (6,969 per game)
- Scoring leader: (Czech Republic) Jaromír Jágr (6 points)

The 2011 Czech Hockey Games was played between 21 and 24 April 2011. The Czech Republic, Finland, Sweden and Russia played a round-robin for a total of three games per team and six games in total. Five of the matches were played in Kajot Arena in Brno, Czech Republic, and one match in Malmö Arena in Malmö, Sweden. The tournament was won by the Czech Republic. The tournament was part of 2010–11 Euro Hockey Tour.

== Standings ==
Pos	Team	Pld	W	OTW	OTL	L	GF	GA	GD	Pts
1	Czech Republic	3	2	0	0	1	10	8	+2	6
2	Russia	3	2	0	0	1	11	10	+1	6
3	Finland	3	1	0	0	2	5	6	−1	3
4	Sweden	3	1	0	0	2	6	8	−2	3

Source: swehockey

== Games ==
All times are local. Brno – (Central European Summer Time – UTC+2) Malmö – (Central European Summer Time – UTC+2)

21 April 2011; 18:00	Finland	1-2 (1-0, 0-1, 0-1)	Czech Republic	Rondo Arena, Brno; Attendance: 7,200

[[]]	Goalies	[[]]	Referees: (Czech Republic) (Czech Republic); Linesmen: (Finland) (Finland)
00:00 – [[]] ([[]], [[]]) / Goals / 00:00 – [[]] ([[]], [[]])			Referees: (Czech Republic) (Czech Republic); Linesmen: (Finland) (Finland)

21 April 2011; 19:30	Sweden	2-4 (0-2, 2-0, 0-2)	Russia	Malmö Arena, Malmö; Attendance: 10,245

[[]]	Goalies	[[]]	Referees: (Czech Republic) (Czech Republic); Linesmen: (Finland) (Finland)
00:00 – [[]] ([[]], [[]]) / Goals / 00:00 – [[]] ([[]], [[]])			Referees: (Czech Republic) (Czech Republic); Linesmen: (Finland) (Finland)

23 April 2011; 14:00	Czech Republic	6-3 (1-0, 3-2, 2-1)	Russia	Rondo Arena, Brno; Attendance: 7,200

[[]]	Goalies	[[]]	Referees: (Czech Republic) (Czech Republic); Linesmen: (Finland) (Finland)
00:00 – [[]] ([[]], [[]]) / Goals / 00:00 – [[]] ([[]], [[]])			Referees: (Czech Republic) (Czech Republic); Linesmen: (Finland) (Finland)

23 April 2011; 19:00	Sweden	0-2 (0-0, 0-1, 0-1)	Finland	Rondo Arena, Brno; Attendance: 5,166

[[]]	Goalies	[[]]	Referees: (Czech Republic) (Czech Republic); Linesmen: (Finland) (Finland)
00:00 – [[]] ([[]], [[]]) / Goals / 00:00 – [[]] ([[]], [[]])			Referees: (Czech Republic) (Czech Republic); Linesmen: (Finland) (Finland)

24 April 2011; 14:00	Russia	4-2 (1-1, 2-1, 1-0)	Finland	Rondo Arena, Brno; Attendance: 4,805

[[]]	Goalies	[[]]	Referees: (Czech Republic) (Czech Republic); Linesmen: (Finland) (Finland)
00:00 – [[]] ([[]], [[]]) / Goals / 00:00 – [[]] ([[]], [[]])			Referees: (Czech Republic) (Czech Republic); Linesmen: (Finland) (Finland)

24 April 2011; 19:00	Czech Republic	2-4 (2-1, 0-2, 0-1)	Sweden	Rondo Arena, Brno; Attendance: 7,200

[[]]	Goalies	[[]]	Referees: (Czech Republic) (Czech Republic); Linesmen: (Finland) (Finland)
00:00 – [[]] ([[]], [[]]) / Goals / 00:00 – [[]] ([[]], [[]])			Referees: (Czech Republic) (Czech Republic); Linesmen: (Finland) (Finland)

== Scoring leaders ==
Pos	Player	Country	GP	G	A	Pts	+/−	PIM	POS
1	Jaromír Jágr	Czech Republic	3	2	4	6	+2	2	RW
2	Alexei Morozov	Russia	3	3	2	5	+6	0	RW
3	Danis Zaripov	Russia	3	3	2	5	+5	0	LW
4	Roman Červenka	Czech Republic	3	2	3	5	+2	4	CE
5	Magnus Pääjärvi	Sweden	3	1	2	3	+2	0	LW

GP = Games played; G = Goals; A = Assists; Pts = Points; +/− = Plus/minus; PIM = Penalties in minutes; POS = Position
Source: swehockey

== Goaltending leaders ==
Pos	Player	Country	TOI	GA	GAA	Sv%	SO
1	Evgeni Nabokov	Russia	120:00	4	2.00	93.44	0
2	Ondřej Pavelec	Czech Republic	120:00	4	2.00	92.59	0
3	Viktor Fasth	Sweden	119:14	5	2.52	90.57	0
4	Petri Vehanen	Finland	119:04	5	2.52	88.10	0

TOI = Time on ice (minutes:seconds); SA = Shots against; GA = Goals against; GAA = Goals Against Average; Sv% = Save percentage; SO = Shutouts
Source: swehockey

== Tournament awards ==
The tournament directorate named the following players in the tournament 2011:

- Best goalkeeper: (Russia) Evgeni Nabokov
- Best defenceman: (Finland) Anssi Salmela
- Best forward: (Czech Republic) Jaromír Jágr
