= Kalle Kerman =

Finnish ice hockey player

- Born: February 10, 1979 (age 47) Kuopio, FIN
- Height: 6 ft 0 in (183 cm)
- Weight: 190 lb (86 kg; 13 st 8 lb)
- Position: Left wing
- Shot: Left
- Played for: SaiPa; Mora IK; Luleå HF; Jokerit; KalPa
- National team: Finland
- Playing career: 2002–2014

Kalle Kerman (born February 10, 1979, in Kuopio) is a Finnish former professional ice hockey forward. He most recently played with KalPa in the Finnish Liiga.

Kerman first played with KalPa in his junior years and men's lower levels before making his SM-liiga debut with SaiPa during 2002–03 season. He played in SaiPa for three seasons before moving to Sweden.

In Sweden, he played one season in Mora IK and one full season in Luleå HF, before moving back to Finland during his second season in Luleå. He played the rest of 2007–08 in Jokerit and continued there the next season. For the 2009–10 season, he returned to KalPa.

On January 26, 2011, Kerman agreed to a three-year contract extension with KalPa.

In 2009, he performed well in national team exhibition games and was chosen to represent Finland in World Championships.
