= Robert Nilsson =

Swedish ice hockey player (born 1985)

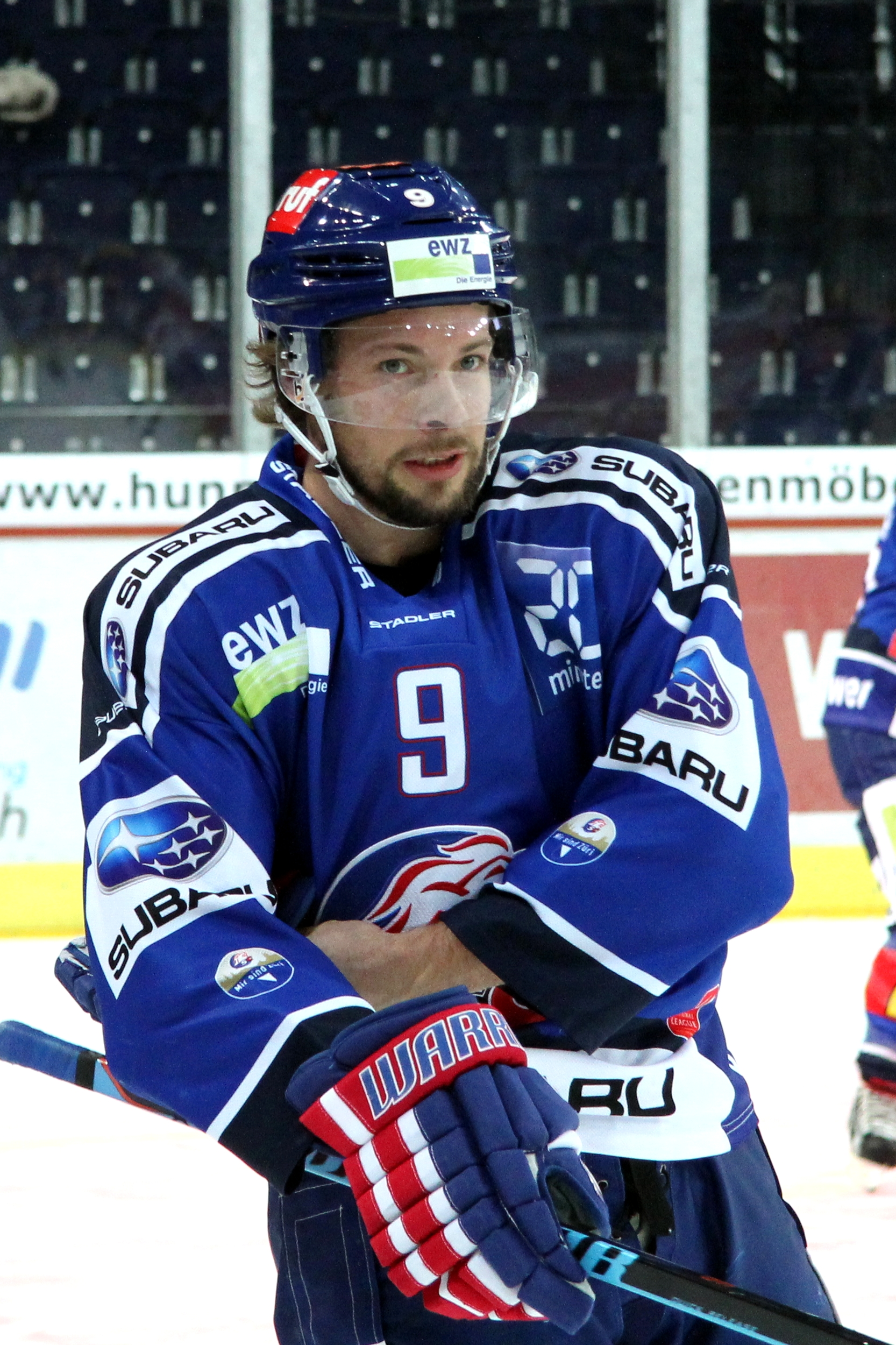
- Born: January 10, 1985 (age 41) Calgary, Alberta, Canada
- Height: 5 ft 11 in (180 cm)
- Weight: 185 lb (84 kg; 13 st 3 lb)
- Position: Centre
- Shot: Left
- Played for: Leksands IF; HC Fribourg-Gottéron; New York Islanders; Edmonton Oilers; Salavat Yulaev Ufa; Torpedo Nizhny Novgorod; ZSC Lions
- National team: Sweden
- NHL draft: 15th overall, 2003; New York Islanders
- Playing career: 2002–2019

Robert Åke Nilsson (born January 10, 1985) is a Swedish former professional ice hockey forward. He last played with the ZSC Lions of the National League (NL).

== Playing career ==
Nilsson began his career in the Elitserien with Leksands IF in 2002–03. He recorded 21 points in his rookie season, breaking Markus Näslund's 13-year mark for most points by a 17-year-old in the league. Nilsson was then drafted by the New York Islanders with the 15th overall pick in the 2003 NHL entry draft.

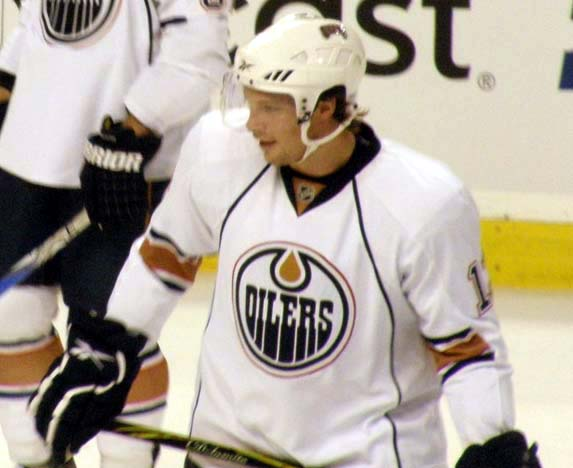
Nilsson during his tenure with the Oilers.

He remained in Sweden an additional two seasons, which included a brief, seven-game stint with HC Fribourg-Gottéron of the Swiss Nationalliga A, before joining the Islanders in 2005–06. Nilsson scored his first NHL goal within a month of his debut on October 29, 2005, against the Buffalo Sabres. Nilsson, however, struggled to adjust to the NHL style of play and was sent down to the Bridgeport Sound Tigers, the Islanders' American Hockey League (AHL) affiliate. After scoring 28 points (8 goals, 20 assists) in 29 games for the Sound Tigers, Nilsson was recalled to finish the year with the Islanders, recording 20 points in 53 total games during his NHL rookie season. At one point, Nilsson played on the top line with team captain Alexei Yashin and close friend Sean Bergenheim.

In 2006–07, Nilsson was sent back to the Sound Tigers to start the season. He remained with the club until February 27, 2007, when he was dealt to the Edmonton Oilers with Ryan O'Marra and the Islanders' first-round pick in the 2007 NHL entry draft for Ryan Smyth. Nilsson transferred AHL teams accordingly and began playing in the Oilers' farm system with the Wilkes-Barre/Scranton Penguins. During a call-up, he scored his first goal as an Oiler on March 15, 2007. He would go on to record a combined 70 points during his next two seasons with the Oilers.

On June 30, 2010, the remainder of Nilsson's contract was bought out by the Oilers. He had one year remaining on his original three-year contract, and would have earned $2.5 million with a $2 million hit against the salary cap. With this buyout, Nilsson became an unrestricted free agent.

On July 22, 2010, it became known that Nilsson had signed a 2-year contract with Salavat Yulaev Ufa of the Kontinental Hockey League.

He transferred to fellow KHL side Torpedo Nizhny Novgorod during the 2011–12 season, where he also spent the following 2012-13 campaign.

Nilsson signed a three-year deal with the ZSC Lions of the Swiss top-flight National League A (NLA) in 2013. Throughout ZSC's 2013-14 championship run, he scored 10 goals and assisted on 24 more in 31 games. He converted the championship-winning penalty in game 4 of the finals against Kloten.

During the 2015–16 season, Nilsson would spend time on a line with coveted draft prospect Auston Matthews, finding chemistry with the young centre, winning the Swiss Cup competition with the Lions that season.

== International play ==
Nilsson represented Sweden at the 2008 and 2011 IIHF World Championships, winning silver in 2011, as well as at the 2003, 2004 and 2005 World Junior Championships.

== Personal life ==
Nilsson was born in Canada while his father, Kent Nilsson, was a member of the NHL's Calgary Flames. The majority of his childhood, however, was spent in Sweden. He is cousins with former professional ice hockey player Niklas Persson.

In 2016, Nilsson married Sasha Khabibulin, the daughter of former teammate, Nikolai Khabibulin.

== Career statistics ==
=== Regular season and playoffs ===
			Regular season					Playoffs
Season	Team	League	GP	G	A	Pts	PIM	GP	G	A	Pts	PIM
2000–01	Leksands IF	J20	18	11	25	36	20	5	3	3	6	6
2001–02	Leksands IF	J20	21	13	18	31	24	1	0	0	0	0
2001–02	Leksands IF	SWE.2	14	1	4	5	8	—	—	—	—	—
2002–03	Leksands IF	SEL	41	8	13	21	10	5	0	1	1	2
2003–04	Leksands IF	J20	4	2	8	10	4	—	—	—	—	—
2003–04	Leksands IF	SEL	34	2	4	6	6	—	—	—	—	—
2003–04	HC Fribourg–Gottéron	NLA	7	1	3	4	2	4	1	0	1	2
2004–05	Djurgårdens IF	J20	8	8	4	12	12	—	—	—	—	—
2004–05	Djurgårdens IF	SEL	23	2	4	6	6	3	0	0	0	0
2004–05	Hammarby IF	SWE.2	7	0	4	4	4	—	—	—	—	—
2004–05	Almtuna IS	SWE.2	3	0	1	1	2	—	—	—	—	—
2005–06	New York Islanders	NHL	53	6	14	20	26	—	—	—	—	—
2005–06	Bridgeport Sound Tigers	AHL	29	8	20	28	12	7	1	4	5	0
2006–07	Bridgeport Sound Tigers	AHL	50	12	34	46	34	—	—	—	—	—
2006–07	Wilkes–Barre/Scranton Penguins	AHL	19	6	14	20	14	11	3	12	15	8
2006–07	Edmonton Oilers	NHL	4	1	0	1	4	—	—	—	—	—
2007–08	Edmonton Oilers	NHL	71	10	31	41	22	—	—	—	—	—
2007–08	Springfield Falcons	AHL	5	2	2	4	4	—	—	—	—	—
2008–09	Edmonton Oilers	NHL	64	9	20	29	26	—	—	—	—	—
2009–10	Edmonton Oilers	NHL	60	11	16	27	12	—	—	—	—	—
2010–11	Salavat Yulaev Ufa	KHL	41	5	22	27	28	21	3	7	10	2
2011–12	Salavat Yulaev Ufa	KHL	15	0	5	5	6	—	—	—	—	—
2011–12	Toros Neftekamsk	VHL	2	1	3	4	0	—	—	—	—	—
2011–12	Torpedo Nizhny Novgorod	KHL	35	12	12	24	30	13	2	6	8	2
2012–13	Torpedo Nizhny Novgorod	KHL	17	5	7	12	2	—	—	—	—	—
2013–14	ZSC Lions	NLA	31	10	24	34	12	18	2	2	4	4
2014–15	ZSC Lions	NLA	44	11	20	31	18	18	5	8	13	4
2015–16	ZSC Lions	NLA	48	12	40	52	16	4	1	1	2	0
2016–17	ZSC Lions	NLA	46	14	37	51	14	1	0	1	1	0
2017–18	ZSC Lions	NL	21	7	19	26	0	—	—	—	—	—
SEL totals			98	12	21	33	22	8	0	1	1	2
NHL totals			252	37	81	118	90	—	—	—	—	—
NLA/NL totals			197	55	143	198	62	45	9	12	21	10

=== International ===
Medal record

Representing Sweden

Ice hockey

World Championships
Silver medal – second place	2011 Bratislava	

Year	Team	Event	Result	GP	G	A	Pts	PIM
2001	Sweden	WJC18	7th	6	2	0	2	0
2002	Sweden	WJC18	9th	8	2	3	5	8
2003	Sweden	WJC	8th	6	4	2	6	4
2004	Sweden	WJC	7th	6	2	5	7	6
2005	Sweden	WJC	6th	6	1	3	4	8
2008	Sweden	WC	4th	9	2	4	6	6
2011	Sweden	WC	2nd place, silver medalist(s)	9	1	6	7	0
Junior totals				32	11	13	24	26
Senior totals				18	3	10	13	6

Awards and achievements
Preceded by Sean Bergenheim	New York Islanders first round pick 2003	Succeeded by Petteri Nokelainen
