= Ladislav Kohn =

- Born: March 4, 1975 (age 51) Uherské Hradiště, Czechoslovakia
- Height: 5 ft 10 in (178 cm)
- Weight: 194 lb (88 kg; 13 st 12 lb)
- Position: Right wing
- Shot: Left
- Played for: HC Kladno; Calgary Flames; Toronto Maple Leafs; Mighty Ducks of Anaheim; Atlanta Thrashers; Detroit Red Wings; Espoo Blues; CSKA Moscow; Neftekhimik Nizhnekamsk; HC Oceláři Třinec; HC Ambrì-Piotta; HC České Budějovice
- National team: Czech Republic
- NHL draft: 175th overall, 1994; Calgary Flames
- Playing career: 1993–2013

Ladislav Kohn (born March 4, 1975) is a Czech former professional ice hockey Forward who played in the National Hockey League (NHL) with the Calgary Flames, Toronto Maple Leafs, Mighty Ducks of Anaheim, Atlanta Thrashers and the Detroit Red Wings.

== Playing career ==
He was drafted by the Calgary Flames in the seventh round, 175th overall, of the 1994 NHL entry draft. He played in Finland's SM-liiga with the Espoo Blues from 2003 to 2007 before moving to Russia with HC CSKA Moscow. He now plays in the Kontinental Hockey League for HC Neftekhimik Nizhnekamsk.

After playing briefly with HC Kladno in the Czechoslovak Extraliga in the 1992–93 season, Kohn joined the Western Hockey League in 1993–94. After two seasons of junior hockey and scoring over 177 points, Kohn made his professional debut with Calgary's AHL affiliate, the Saint John Flames.

Kohn played five NHL games with Calgary in the 1995–96 season, and four more in the 1997–98 season. Before the 1998–99 season, the Flames traded him to the Toronto Maple Leafs in exchange for David Cooper.

Kohn would become an NHL journeyman, playing for Calgary, Toronto, the Mighty Ducks of Anaheim, the Atlanta Thrashers, the Detroit Red Wings, then the Flames again. He returned to Europe in 2003–04, joining the Espoo Blues. In 2001-02 he played only 4 games for Detroit. Although he was part of the 2002 Detroit Red Wings Stanley Cup team, Kohn did not qualify to have name included on the Stanley Cup (41 regular season games played, or 1 game played in the finals).

In his NHL career, Kohn appeared in 186 regular-season games. He scored 14 goals and added 28 assists. He also appeared in two games with Toronto during the 1999 Stanley Cup Playoffs, going scoreless.

== International play ==
Kohn played his first game for the national team in 2004, and has played 23 times for the Czech national team. He played in the 1993 Under 18 Junior Championship, 1995 World Juniors Championship, and Men's 2008 World Championship.

== Career statistics ==
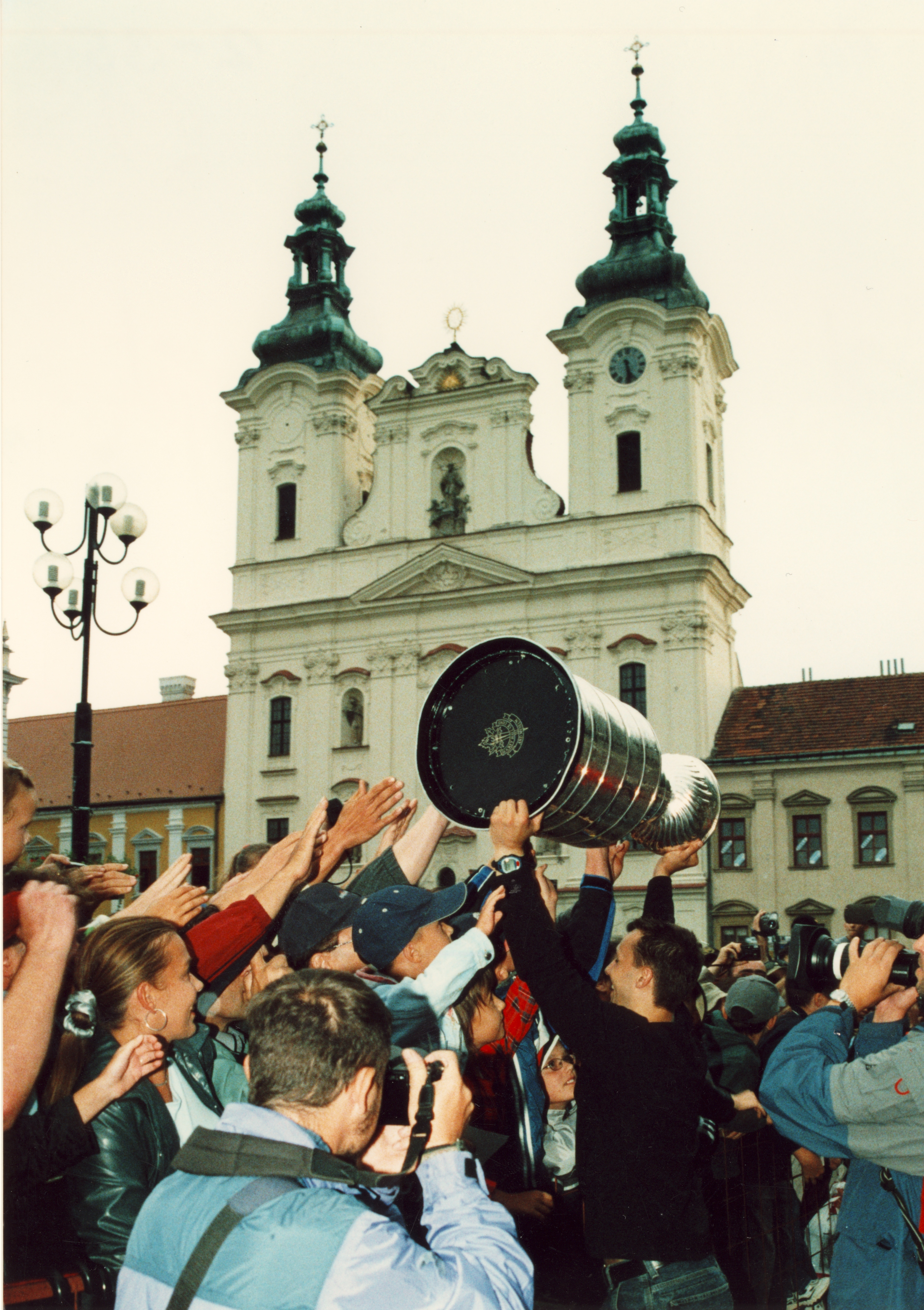
Kohn with the Stanley Cup in his hometown of Uherské Hradiště.

=== Regular season and playoffs ===
			Regular season					Playoffs
Season	Team	League	GP	G	A	Pts	PIM	GP	G	A	Pts	PIM
1992–93	Poldi SONP Kladno	TCH	2	0	0	0	0	—	—	—	—	—
1993–94	Brandon Wheat Kings	WHL	2	0	0	0	0	—	—	—	—	—
1993–94	Swift Current Broncos	WHL	69	33	35	68	68	7	5	4	9	8
1994–95	Swift Current Broncos	WHL	65	32	60	92	122	6	2	6	8	14
1994–95	Saint John Flames	AHL	1	0	0	0	0	—	—	—	—	—
1995–96	Calgary Flames	NHL	5	1	0	1	2	—	—	—	—	—
1995–96	Saint John Flames	AHL	73	28	45	73	97	16	6	5	11	12
1996–97	Saint John Flames	AHL	76	28	29	57	81	21	14	6	20	20
1997–98	Calgary Flames	NHL	4	0	1	1	0	—	—	—	—	—
1997–98	Saint John Flames	AHL	65	25	31	56	90	—	—	—	—	—
1998–99	Toronto Maple Leafs	NHL	16	1	3	4	4	2	0	0	0	5
1998–99	St. John's Maple Leafs	AHL	61	27	42	69	90	—	—	—	—	—
1999–2000	Mighty Ducks of Anaheim	NHL	77	5	16	21	27	—	—	—	—	—
2000–01	Mighty Ducks of Anaheim	NHL	51	4	3	7	42	—	—	—	—	—
2000–01	Atlanta Thrashers	NHL	26	3	4	7	44	—	—	—	—	—
2001–02	Cincinnati Mighty Ducks	AHL	4	0	0	0	9	—	—	—	—	—
2001–02	Detroit Red Wings	NHL	4	0	0	0	4	—	—	—	—	—
2001–02	Blues	SM-l	40	22	13	35	103	3	0	0	0	14
2002–03	Calgary Flames	NHL	3	0	1	1	2	—	—	—	—	—
2002–03	Saint John Flames	AHL	35	8	19	27	30	—	—	—	—	—
2002–03	Philadelphia Phantoms	AHL	15	4	7	11	2	—	—	—	—	—
2003–04	Blues	SM-l	54	20	18	38	60	9	1	5	6	29
2004–05	Blues	SM-l	56	17	28	45	90	—	—	—	—	—
2005–06	Blues	SM-l	51	18	12	30	38	9	4	2	6	8
2006–07	Blues	SM-l	53	23	22	45	62	9	3	2	5	24
2007–08	CSKA Moskva	RSL	56	12	20	32	63	6	1	2	3	10
2008–09	Neftekhimik Nizhnekamsk	KHL	54	14	12	26	46	4	0	2	2	6
2009–10	HC Oceláři Třinec	ELH	51	21	33	54	148	5	3	3	6	6
2010–11	HC Oceláři Třinec	ELH	33	7	11	18	34	18	4	11	15	39
2011–12	HC Oceláři Třinec	ELH	37	5	14	19	56	—	—	—	—	—
2011–12	HC Ambrì–Piotta	NLA	8	1	3	4	8	—	—	—	—	—
2012–13	HC Mountfield	ELH	28	3	14	17	20	—	—	—	—	—
AHL totals			330	120	173	293	399	42	20	11	31	32
NHL totals			186	14	28	42	125	2	0	0	0	5
SM-l totals			254	100	93	193	353	30	8	9	17	75

=== International ===
Year	Team	Event	Result	GP	G	A	Pts	PIM
1993	Czechoslovakia	EJC18	3rd place, bronze medalist(s)	5	5	4	9	4
1995	Czech Republic	WJC	6th	7	0	4	4	8
2008	Czech Republic	WC	5th	5	0	1	1	14
Junior totals				12	5	8	13	12
Senior totals				5	0	1	1	14
