= Alexander Yeryomenko =

Russian ice hockey goaltender

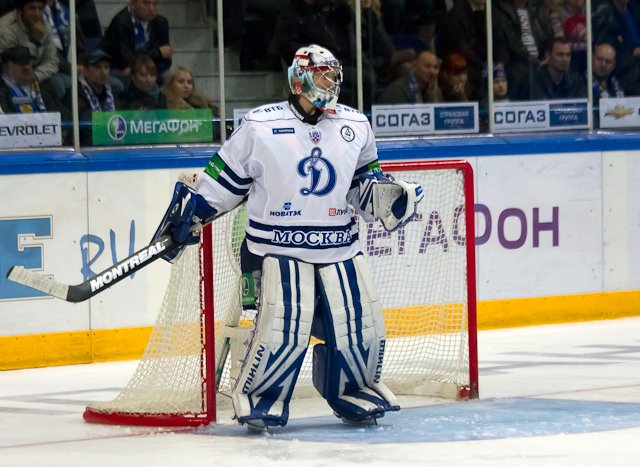
- Born: 10 April 1980 (age 46) Moscow, Russian SFSR, Soviet Union
- Height: 5 ft 11 in (180 cm)
- Weight: 172 lb (78 kg; 12 st 4 lb)
- Position: Goaltender
- Caught: Left
- Played for: Dynamo Moscow; Amur Khabarovsk; Ak Bars Kazan; Salavat Yulaev Ufa
- National team: Russia
- Playing career: 2000–2022

Alexander Vladimirovich Yeryomenko (Russian: Александр Владимирович Ерёменко; born 10 April 1980) is a Russian former professional ice hockey goaltender who most notably played for Dynamo Moscow in the Kontinental Hockey League (KHL).

== Playing career ==
Alexander Eremenko started his pro career in 1999 with the Russian hockey team THK Tver. He played from 2001 to 2005 for the HC Dynamo Moscow in the RSL. At the end of the 04/05 season he became Russian champion with Dynamo Moscow, before he signed a 2-year contract with Ak Bars Kazan. He was also selected as a reserve by Team Russia for the 2010 Winter Olympics should an injury occur during the tournament.

He played for Salavat Yulaev Ufa of the KHL before returning to Dynamo Moscow for the 2011–12 season.

On 23 March 2022, following the conclusion of the 2021–22 season, Yeryomenko announced his retirement after 22 years in the top flight Russian leagues.

== Career statistics ==
=== Regular season and playoffs ===
			Regular season									Playoffs
Season	Team	League	GP	W	L	T/OT	MIN	GA	SO	GAA	SV%	GP	W	L	MIN	GA	SO	GAA	SV%
2008–09	Salavat Yulaev Ufa	KHL	36	27	6	2	2036	59	3	1.74	.937	4	1	2	255	9	1	2.12	.927
2009–10	Salavat Yulaev Ufa	KHL	32	24	5	0	1770	52	2	1.76	.931	12	8	4	726	20	1	1.65	.934
2010–11	Salavat Yulaev Ufa	KHL	17	8	3	2	965	51	0	3.17	.898	—	—	—	—	—	—	—	—
2011–12	Dynamo Moscow	KHL	35	18	9	5	1975	63	6	1.91	.920	21	16	5	1304	34	3	1.56	.943
2012–13	Dynamo Moscow	KHL	30	17	7	6	1784	55	5	1.85	.931	21	16	5	1309	38	3	1.74	.934
2013–14	Dynamo Moscow	KHL	31	23	5	3	1869	58	6	1.86	.930	7	3	4	444	16	1	2.16	.915
2014–15	Dynamo Moscow	KHL	32	19	8	4	1742	62	4	2.13	.923	—	—	—	—	—	—	—	—
2015–16	Dynamo Moscow	KHL	23	11	4	7	1392	41	2	1.77	.936	10	6	4	646	19	3	1.76	.940
2016–17	Dynamo Moscow	KHL	37	24	4	5	2093	45	9	1.29	.950	10	5	5	653	21	1	1.93	.928
2017–18	Dynamo Moscow	KHL	42	13	16	8	2283	87	3	2.29	.929	—	—	—	—	—	—	—	—
2018–19	Dynamo Moscow	KHL	29	13	13	0	1610	68	3	2.53	.911	7	3	4	409	15	1	2.20	.938
2019–20	Dynamo Moscow	KHL	20	9	5	2	981	42	0	2.57	.921	5	4	1	302	10	0	1.99	.936
2020–21	Dynamo Moscow	KHL	26	16	6	2	1371	40	4	1.75	.936	4	2	2	235	11	1	2.81	.887
2021–22	Dynamo Moscow	KHL	15	9	4	1	756	26	1	2.06	.920	9	4	3	443	18	0	2.44	.899
KHL totals			405	231	92	47	22,629	749	48	1.99	.928	110	68	40	6,727	211	15	1.88	.931

Medal record

Representing Russia

Ice hockey

World Championships
Bronze medal – third place	2005 Austria	
Bronze medal – third place	2007 Russia	
Gold medal – first place	2008 Canada	
Gold medal – first place	2009 Switzerland	
Silver medal – second place	2010 Germany	

=== International ===
Year	Team	Event	Result	GP	W	L	T	MIN	GA	SO	GAA	SV%
2005	Russia	WC	3rd place, bronze medalist(s)	0	—	—	—	—	—	—	—	—
2007	Russia	WC	3rd place, bronze medalist(s)	6	5	1	—	367	6	2	0.98	.957
2008	Russia	WC	1st place, gold medalist(s)	2	2	0	—	86	3	0	2.10	.917
2009	Russia	WC	1st place, gold medalist(s)	3	3	0	—	140	3	0	1.29	.947
2010	Russia	Oly	QF	0	—	—	—	—	—	—	—	—
2010	Russia	WC	2nd place, silver medalist(s)	1	1	0	—	60	1	0	1.00	.947

== Honours ==
- Russian Championship (Before 2009): 2005, 2006, 2008
- Gagarin Cup Winner (Since 2009): 2011, 2012, 2013
- Russian Super League runner up: 2007
- Euro Hockey Tour: 2005, 2006, 2007, 2008
- Ceska Pojistovna Cup: 2006, 2008
- Channel One Cup: 2006, 2008
- European Champions Cup: 2006, 2007
- World Champion: 2008, 2009
- KHL All-Star Game: 2009
- Gagarin Cup MVP: 2012, 2013
