= Petr Hubáček =

Czech ice hockey player (born 1979)

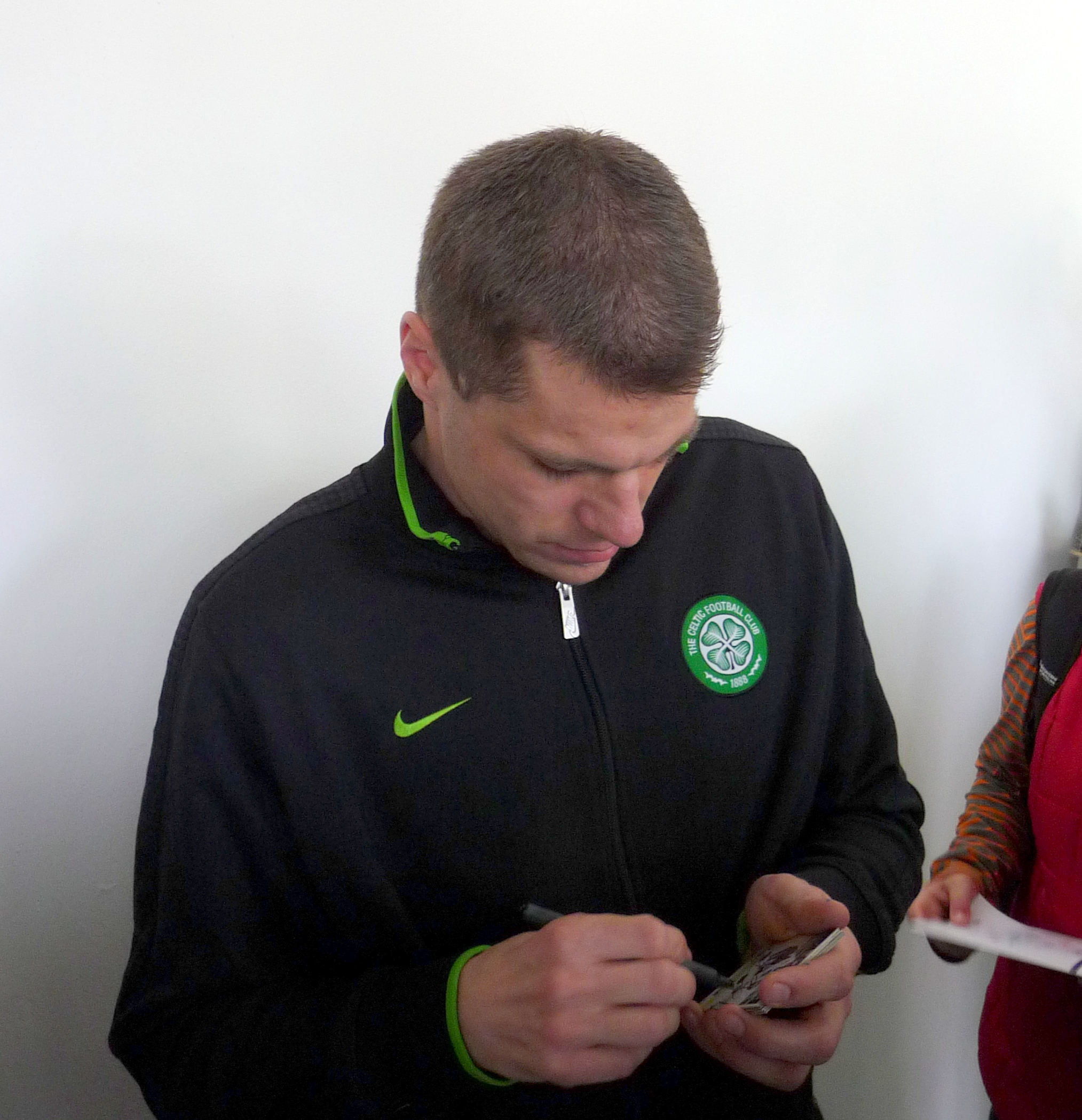
- Petr Hubáček 2010/2011
- Born: September 2, 1979 (age 47) Brno, Czechoslovakia
- Height: 6 ft 0 in (183 cm)
- Weight: 198 lb (90 kg; 14 st 2 lb)
- Position: Center
- Shot: Right
- Played for: HC Vítkovice; Philadelphia Flyers; HC Zlín; SC Bern; HC Neftekhimik Nizhnekamsk; HC Kometa Brno; JYP Jyväskylä; HC Dynamo Pardubice
- National team: Czech Republic
- NHL draft: 243rd overall, 1998; Philadelphia Flyers
- Playing career: 1997–2018

Medal record

Representing Czech Republic

World Championships
Silver medal – second place	2006 Riga	
Gold medal – first place	2010 Cologne	
Bronze medal – third place	2011 Bratislava	

Petr Hubáček (born September 2, 1979 in Brno, Czechoslovakia) is a former Czech professional ice hockey forward who played in the National Hockey League (NHL), Czech Extraliga, Swiss National League, Kontinental Hockey League (KHL), and Finnish Liiga.

His younger brother Radek Hubáček also played the sport professionally.

== Playing career ==
Hubáček was drafted in the ninth round of the 1998 NHL entry draft by the Philadelphia Flyers. He played six games with the Flyers during the 2000–01 season and scored his only NHL goal in the team's season opener.

He joined HC Dynamo Pardubice after five seasons in Finland with JYP Jyväskylä of the Liiga on June 2, 2016.

== Career statistics ==
=== Regular season and playoffs ===
			Regular season					Playoffs
Season	Team	League	GP	G	A	Pts	PIM	GP	G	A	Pts	PIM
1997–98	HC Kometa Brno	Cze.1	48	6	10	16	22	—	—	—	—	—
1998–99	HC Vitkovice	ELH	25	0	4	4	2	4	0	0	0	0
1998–99	HC Kometa Brno	Cze.1	9	1	5	6	10	6	2	3	5	6
1999–00	HC Vitkovice	ELH	48	11	12	23	85	—	—	—	—	—
2000–01	Philadelphia Phantoms	AHL	62	3	9	12	29	9	0	1	1	6
2000–01	Philadelphia Flyers	NHL	6	1	0	1	2	—	—	—	—	—
2001–02	Philadelphia Phantoms	AHL	22	1	6	7	8	—	—	—	—	—
2001–02	Milwaukee Admirals	AHL	14	2	0	2	2	—	—	—	—	—
2002–03	HC Zlín	ELH	44	4	15	19	14	—	—	—	—	—
2002–03	HC Vitkovice	ELH	7	1	4	5	10	6	1	0	1	16
2003–04	HC Vitkovice	ELH	46	7	14	21	26	6	1	0	1	53
2004–05	HC Vitkovice	ELH	51	13	11	24	38	9	0	1	1	33
2005–06	HC Vitkovice	ELH	52	17	23	40	46	6	1	0	1	2
2006–07	HC Vitkovice	ELH	49	17	19	36	62	—	—	—	—	—
2006–07	SC Bern	NLA	—	—	—	—	—	5	0	2	2	2
2007–08	HC Vitkovice	ELH	40	10	7	17	89	—	—	—	—	—
2008–09	HC Neftekhimik Nizhnekamsk	KHL	35	3	6	9	8	—	—	—	—	—
2008–09	HC Vitkovice	ELH	5	1	0	1	2	10	4	6	10	6
2009–10	HC Vitkovice	ELH	37	10	19	29	6	—	—	—	—	—
2009–10	HC Kometa Brno	ELH	13	1	3	4	8	—	—	—	—	—
2010–11	HC Kometa Brno	ELH	47	7	12	19	52	—	—	—	—	—
2011–12	HC Kometa Brno	ELH	27	4	4	8	32	—	—	—	—	—
2011–12	JYP	SM-l	30	5	9	14	6	14	1	6	7	2
2012–13	JYP	SM-l	29	5	10	15	8	11	1	3	4	4
2013–14	JYP	Liiga	50	10	12	22	14	7	3	1	4	6
2014–15	JYP	Liiga	60	8	16	24	14	12	4	6	10	2
2015–16	JYP	Liiga	57	4	12	16	12	13	2	2	4	2
2016–17	HC Dynamo Pardubice	ELH	48	8	9	17	26	—	—	—	—	—
2017–18	Dragons de Rouen	FRA	38	4	7	11	14	15	0	3	3	2
NHL totals			6	1	0	1	2	—	—	—	—	—
