= Czech Hockey Games =

Annual ice hockey tournament in the Czech Republic

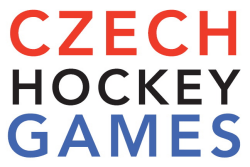
- Genre: sporting event
- Date: April–May
- Frequency: annual
- Locations: Prague, Brno, Ostravar, Pardubice
- Country: Czech Republic
- Inaugurated: 1994
- Most recent: 2026

The Czech Hockey Games, also sponsored as Fortuna Hockey Games, is an annual ice hockey event held in Czech Republic. It is part of the Euro Hockey Tour. It was previously sponsored as the Pragobanka Cup, Česká Pojišťovna Cup, KAJOTbet Hockey Games, Carlson Hockey Games and Betano Hockey Games.

== History ==
The tournament started in 1994 as the Pragobanka Cup. In 1998, it became sponsored by Česká pojišťovna.In 2012, the tournament name was changed for two seasons when Kajotbet took over the sponsoring. In 2017, it became the Carlson Hockey Games, and since 2024, this tournament has been called Betano Hockey Games.

In the 1997–98 season, the tournament joined the Euro Hockey Tour and the Slovak national team was replaced with the Finnish national team.

From its start in 1994 until 2009, the tournament was always played between August and September. Since 2009, it has typically been played in April every year, with exceptions for the 2010 and 2014 Winter Olympics years, when the tournament was instead played in the August or September before the Olympics. The tournament was not moved prior to the 2018 Winter Olympics.

Prior to 2003, the tournament was played in Zlín at AC ZPS Zlín's home arena. It then moved to the Duhová Aréna in Pardubice, and then to the Tipsport Arena in Liberec, northern Bohemia, in 2005.

== Results ==
Final standings in each event are determined in a round-robin tournament. If teams are tied in points, the standing is determined by the result of the game between the tied teams.

Year	Winner	Runner-up	3rd place	4th place
1994	Czech Republic	Russia	Sweden	—
1995	Czech Republic	Sweden	Slovakia	—
1996	Finland	Sweden	Czech Republic	—
Part of the Euro Hockey Tour
1997	Czech Republic	Finland	Russia	Sweden
1998	Sweden	Finland	Czech Republic	Russia
1999	Czech Republic	Finland	Sweden	Russia
2000	Finland	Sweden	Russia	Czech Republic
2001	Finland	Russia	Sweden	Czech Republic
2002	Russia	Czech Republic	Sweden	Finland
2003	Finland	Sweden	Russia	Czech Republic
2004	No tournament held due to the World Cup of Hockey			
2005	Sweden	Russia	Czech Republic	Finland
2006	Russia	Finland	Sweden	Czech Republic
2007	No tournament held (played in next calendar year)			
2008	Russia	Czech Republic	Finland	Sweden
2009 (April)	Russia	Czech Republic	Finland	Sweden
2009 (September)	Czech Republic	Russia	Finland	Sweden
2010	No tournament held (played in next calendar year)			
2011	Czech Republic	Russia	Finland	Sweden
2012	Finland	Czech Republic	Russia	Sweden
2013 (April)	Sweden	Russia	Czech Republic	Finland
2013 (August)	Finland	Russia	Sweden	Czech Republic
2014	No tournament held (series of 'double headers' played)			
2015	No tournament held (series of 'double headers' played)			
2016	No tournament held (played in next calendar year)			
2017	Czech Republic	Finland	Russia	Sweden
2018	Czech Republic	Finland	Sweden	Russia
2019	Sweden	Finland	Russia	Czech Republic
2020	Tournament cancelled due to the coronavirus pandemic			
2021	Czech Republic	Sweden	Finland	Russia
2022	Czech Republic	Sweden	Finland	Austria
2023	Switzerland	Sweden	Czech Republic	Finland
2024	Finland	Sweden	Switzerland	Czech Republic
2025	Sweden	Switzerland	Czech Republic	Finland
2026	Sweden	Czech Republic	Finland	Switzerland
2027	TBD	TBD	TBD	TBD

== Medal table ==
Pos	Team	Gold	Silver	Bronze	Total
1	Czech Republic	10	5	8	23
2	Finland	7	7	7	21
3	Sweden	6	8	7	21
4	Russia	4	7	5	16
5	Switzerland	1	1	1	3
6	Slovakia	0	0	1	1
