= Robin Hanzl =

Czech ice hockey player

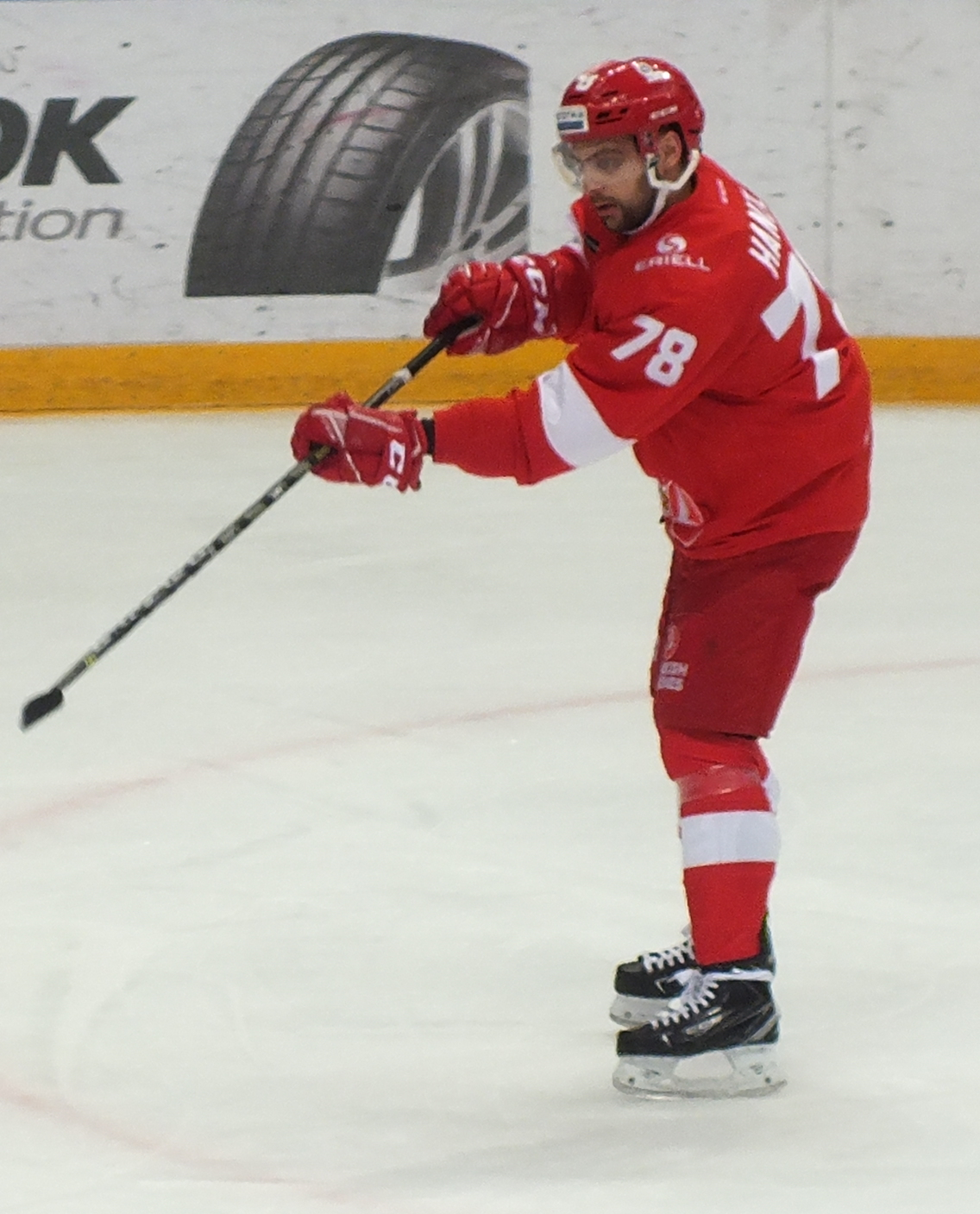
- Born: 10 January 1989 (age 36); Ústí nad Labem, Czechoslovakia
- Height: 183 cm (6 ft 0 in)
- Weight: 78 kg (172 lb; 12 st 4 lb)
- Position: Forward
- Shoots: Left
- SHL team Former teams: Malmö Redhawks; HC Litvínov; Neftekhimik Nizhnekamsk; Spartak Moscow; Timrå IK
- National team: Czech Republic
- Playing career: 2010–present

Robin Hanzl (born 10 January 1989) is a Czech professional ice hockey forward. He is currently playing for Malmö Redhawks in the Swedish Hockey League (SHL).

== Playing career ==
He made his professional debut in his native Czech Republic, playing with HC Litvínov in the Czech Extraliga during the 2010–11 Czech Extraliga season.

Hanzl left the Czech Extraliga after seven seasons and played his first season abroad in the KHL with HC Neftekhimik Nizhnekamsk in 2017–18. Hanzl left Nizhnekamsk after just one year opting to continue in the KHL in agreeing to terms on a one-year contract with his second Russian club, HC Spartak Moscow, on May 3, 2018.

Hanzl remained with Spartak Moscow for three seasons, totalling 89 points in 167 games before leaving as a free agent following the 2020–21 season. On 18 June 2021, Hanzl moved to the SHL, joining newly promoted club, Timrå IK, on a one-year contract.

== Career statistics ==
=== International ===
Year	Team	Event	Result	GP	G	A	Pts	PIM
2017	Czech Republic	WC	7th	8	1	1	2	2
2021	Czech Republic	WC	7th	7	0	4	4	2
Senior totals				15	1	5	6	4
