= Hannes Hyvönen =

Finnish ice hockey player (born 1975)

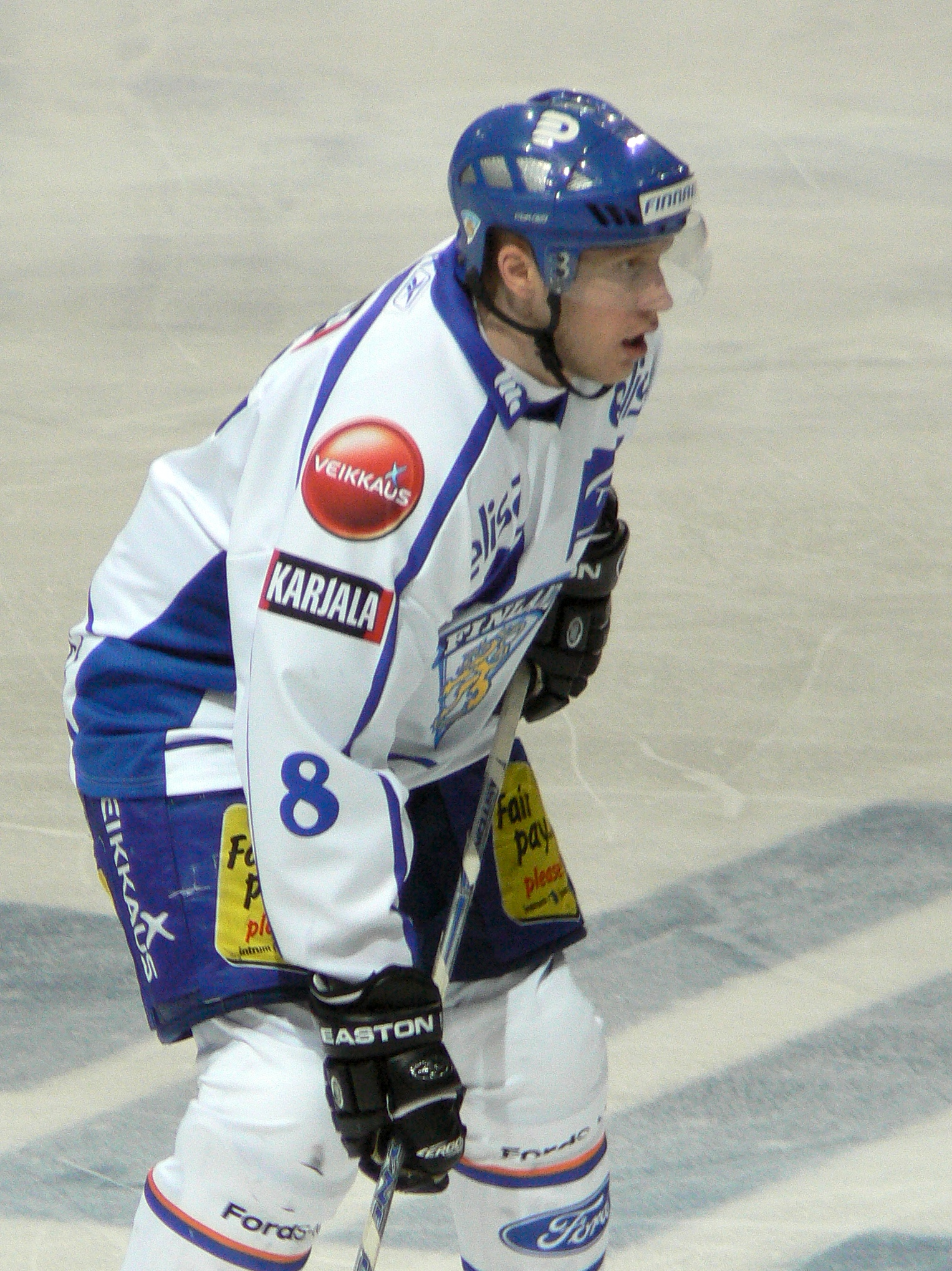
- Born: August 29, 1975 (age 50) Oulu, Finland
- Height: 6 ft 1 in (185 cm)
- Weight: 202 lb (92 kg; 14 st 6 lb)
- Position: Right wing
- Shot: Right
- Played for: HC TPS; Espoo Blues; HC Fribourg-Gotteron; Jokerit; Kärpät; Södertälje SK; Dynamo Minsk; Ak Bars Kazan; Rapperswil-Jona Lakers; Traktor Chelyabinsk; HIFK; Färjestad BK; Karlskrona HK; Kongsvinger IL; Kils AIK
- Current Liiga coach: Porin Ässät
- Coached for: Laser HT; Peliitat
- National team: Finland
- NHL draft: 257th overall, 1999; San Jose Sharks
- Playing career: 1994–2016

Hannes Hyvönen
Medal record

Representing Finland

World Championship
Bronze medal – third place	2008 Quebec	

Hannes Ossian Hyvönen (born August 29, 1975) is a Finnish former professional ice hockey player. He played 42 games in the National Hockey League with the San Jose Sharks and Columbus Blue Jackets between 2002 and 2003, though most of his career, which lasted from 1994 to 2009, was spent in European leagues. Internationally Hyvönen played for the Finnish national team at the 2008 and 2009 World Championships, winning a bronze in 2008. Hyvönen now works as a coach for Porin Ässät of the Liiga.

== Playing career ==
Hyvönen started out in the Kärpät junior team, and started playing in the SM-liiga with TPS. He was drafted by the San Jose Sharks as their ninth-round pick in the 1999 NHL entry draft. After playing on a number of SM-liiga teams, Hyvönen departed to North America for the 2001–02 season, which he mostly spent with the Sharks' AHL affiliate, the former Cleveland Barons. He was next signed by the Florida Panthers, but the Columbus Blue Jackets signed him from the waivers list before the start of the season. Near the end of the 2002–03 NHL season the Blue Jackets loaned Hyvönen to Färjestads BK in the Swedish Elitserien. He started the 2004–05 NHL lockout season with Färjestad, and later transferred to Ilves in the SM-liiga. In 2005 Hyvönen signed with HC Fribourg-Gottéron in the NLA, but although he led the team in scoring by the start of November, his performance was deemed unsatisfactory and he was sold to Jokerit.

In February 2002, Hyvönen received an eight-game suspension for high sticking in the AHL. He also received the most penalty minutes, 189, in the SM-liiga during the 1999–2000 season.

Prior to the 2008–09 season, he signed for Södertälje SK of the Swedish Elite League (SEL), but on November 28 his contract was mutually cancelled and Hyvönen moved to HC Dinamo Minsk of the Kontinental Hockey League (KHL). In the 2010–11 season he played for Rapperswil-Jona Lakers of the National League A (NLA), Traktor Chelyabinsk of the KHL, and HIFK of the SM-liiga.

He signed a 15-game try-out contract with Färjestad of the SEL on September 28, 2011, for a comeback season with the club. His first goal in his comeback with the team was scored in his first game, when he tied a game against Djurgårdens IF 1–1. Djurgården left the game with a 3–2 victory in a shootout.

== Career statistics ==
=== Regular season and playoffs ===
			Regular season					Playoffs
Season	Team	League	GP	G	A	Pts	PIM	GP	G	A	Pts	PIM
1992–93	Kärpät U18	FIN U18	33	17	12	29	73	—	—	—	—	—
1993–94	Kärpät U20	FIN U20	35	15	13	28	26	3	0	0	0	0
1993–94	Kärpät	FIN-2	3	3	1	4	2	—	—	—	—	—
1994–95	TPS U20	FIN U20	10	8	2	10	64	—	—	—	—	—
1994–95	TPS	FIN	9	4	3	7	16	5	0	0	0	2
1994–95	Kiekko-67	FIN-2	16	4	2	6	10	—	—	—	—	—
1995–96	TPS	SML	30	11	5	16	49	7	1	0	1	28
1995–96	Kiekko-67	FIN-2	2	1	0	1	8	—	—	—	—	—
1996–97	TPS	FIN	41	10	5	15	48	10	4	2	6	14
1997–98	TPS	FIN	29	2	6	8	71	2	0	0	0	0
1998–99	Espoo Blues	FIN	52	23	18	41	74	4	2	1	3	2
1999–00	Espoo Blues	FIN	18	5	2	7	124	—	—	—	—	—
1999–00	HIFK	FIN	22	2	2	4	65	9	4	0	4	8
2000–01	HIFK	FIN	56	14	12	26	34	5	0	0	0	8
2001–02	Cleveland Barons	AHL	67	24	18	42	136	—	—	—	—	—
2001–02	San Jose Sharks	NHL	6	0	0	0	0	—	—	—	—	—
2002–03	Columbus Blue Jackets	NHL	36	4	5	9	22	—	—	—	—	—
2002–03	Färjestads BK	SWE	10	11	0	11	12	14	5	0	5	41
2003–04	Färjestads BK	SWE	47	15	13	28	98	17	7	5	12	43
2004–05	Färjestads BK	SWE	8	1	0	1	10	—	—	—	—	—
2004–05	Ilves	FIN	16	4	8	12	16	7	4	1	5	6
2005–06	HC Fribourg-Gottéron	NLA	16	4	8	12	16	—	—	—	—	—
2005–06	Jokerit	FIN	35	16	12	28	93	—	—	—	—	—
2006–07	Kärpät	FIN	15	9	12	21	16	10	3	4	7	18
2007–08	Kärpät	FIN	54	24	42	66	42	15	8	13	21	14
2008–09	Södertälje SK	SWE	24	10	7	17	10	—	—	—	—	—
2008–09	Dinamo Minsk	KHL	25	12	8	20	22	—	—	—	—	—
2009–10	Dinamo Minsk	KHL	32	16	11	27	42	—	—	—	—	—
2009–10	Ak Bars Kazan	KHL	12	2	3	5	18	16	5	3	8	6
2010–11	Rapperswil-Jona Lakers	NLA	4	4	2	6	2	—	—	—	—	—
2010–11	Traktor Chelyabinsk	KHL	17	2	0	2	6	—	—	—	—	—
2010–11	HIFK	FIN	10	3	1	4	29	—	—	—	—	—
2011–12	Färjestad BK	SWE	36	10	9	19	41	8	2	1	3	54
2012–13	Karlskrona HK	SWE-2	10	1	2	3	4	—	—	—	—	—
2013–14	Kongsvinger Knights	NOR-2	9	13	4	17	20	—	—	—	—	—
2015–16	Kils AIK	SWE-4	8	7	3	10	12	—	—	—	—	—
NHL totals			42	4	5	9	22	—	—	—	—	—
FIN totals			407	150	138	288	712	74	26	21	47	100

=== International ===
Year	Team	Event	GP	G	A	Pts	PIM
2008	Finland	WC	6	1	3	4	29
2009	Finland	WC	7	2	4	6	12
Senior totals			13	3	7	10	41
