= Pekka Jormakka =

Finnish ice hockey player

- Born: September 14, 1990 (age 35) Jyväskylän mlk, Finland
- Height: 5 ft 9 in (175 cm)
- Weight: 181 lb (82 kg; 12 st 13 lb)
- Position: Wing
- Shoots: Right
- Liiga team Former teams: Jukurit; JYP; Lahti Pelicans; Tappara; Jokerit; HC Vityaz; Sibir Novosibirsk; Grizzlys Wolfsburg
- National team: Finland
- Playing career: 2008–present

Pekka Jormakka (born September 14, 1990) is a Finnish professional ice hockey player who is currently playing for Mikkelin Jukurit of the Finnish Liiga.

== Playing career ==
He has previously played in the top level Finnish Liiga with JYP Jyväskylä, Lahti Pelicans and Tappara. He gained fame in Finland during the 2018 IIHF World Championships as being the only playing Finnish forward that failed to score any points, despite the other forwards scoring a combined 77 points as of May 17, 2018. This caused many to question Finland's head coach for having Jormakka play power play.

== Career statistics ==
=== Regular season and playoffs ===
			Regular season					Playoffs
Season	Team	League	GP	G	A	Pts	PIM	GP	G	A	Pts	PIM
2008–09	JYP	SM-l	17	1	2	3	2	—	—	—	—	—
2008–09	D Team	Mestis	7	1	0	1	0	—	—	—	—	—
2009–10	JYP	SM-l	4	0	0	0	0	—	—	—	—	—
2009–10	D Team	Mestis	25	15	4	19	6	—	—	—	—	—
2010–11	JYP	SM-l	7	1	3	4	4	—	—	—	—	—
2010–11	D Team	Mestis	31	15	12	27	22	—	—	—	—	—
2011–12	Pelicans	SM-l	42	7	14	21	6	9	1	2	3	2
2012–13	Pelicans	SM-l	54	19	16	35	6	—	—	—	—	—
2013–14	Tappara	Liiga	45	13	14	27	22	20	4	4	8	14
2014–15	Tappara	Liiga	59	15	10	25	10	20	8	10	18	4
2015–16	Jokerit	KHL	52	12	18	30	20	2	0	2	2	2
2016–17	Jokerit	KHL	43	13	13	26	8	3	0	0	0	0
2017–18	Jokerit	KHL	47	12	8	20	12	8	2	4	6	4
2018–19	Jokerit	KHL	48	7	16	23	22	5	1	1	2	0
2019–20	HC Vityaz	KHL	48	12	9	21	10	2	0	1	1	0
2020–21	Sibir Novosibirsk	KHL	9	1	0	1	0	—	—	—	—	—
2020–21	Grizzlys Wolfsburg	DEL	28	9	7	16	4	9	0	1	1	0
2021–22	Jukurit	Liiga	42	9	19	28	10	7	1	3	4	0
2022–23	Jukurit	Liiga	49	16	13	29	8	—	—	—	—	—
2023–24	Jukurit	Liiga	54	19	20	39	45	6	1	5	6	0
Liiga totals			373	100	111	211	113	62	15	24	39	20
KHL totals			247	57	64	121	72	20	3	8	11	6

Medal record

Representing Finland

Ice hockey

World Championships
Silver medal – second place	2014 Minsk	

=== International ===
Year	Team	Event	Result	GP	G	A	Pts	PIM
2008	Finland	WJC18	6th	6	2	2	4	2
2010	Finland	WJC	5th	6	1	0	1	0
2014	Finland	WC	2nd place, silver medalist(s)	6	0	2	2	0
2018	Finland	WC	5th	8	0	0	0	2
2024	Finland	WC	8th	7	1	0	1	0
Junior totals				12	3	2	5	2
Senior totals				21	1	2	3	2
