= Sakari Salminen =

Finnish ice hockey player (born 1998)

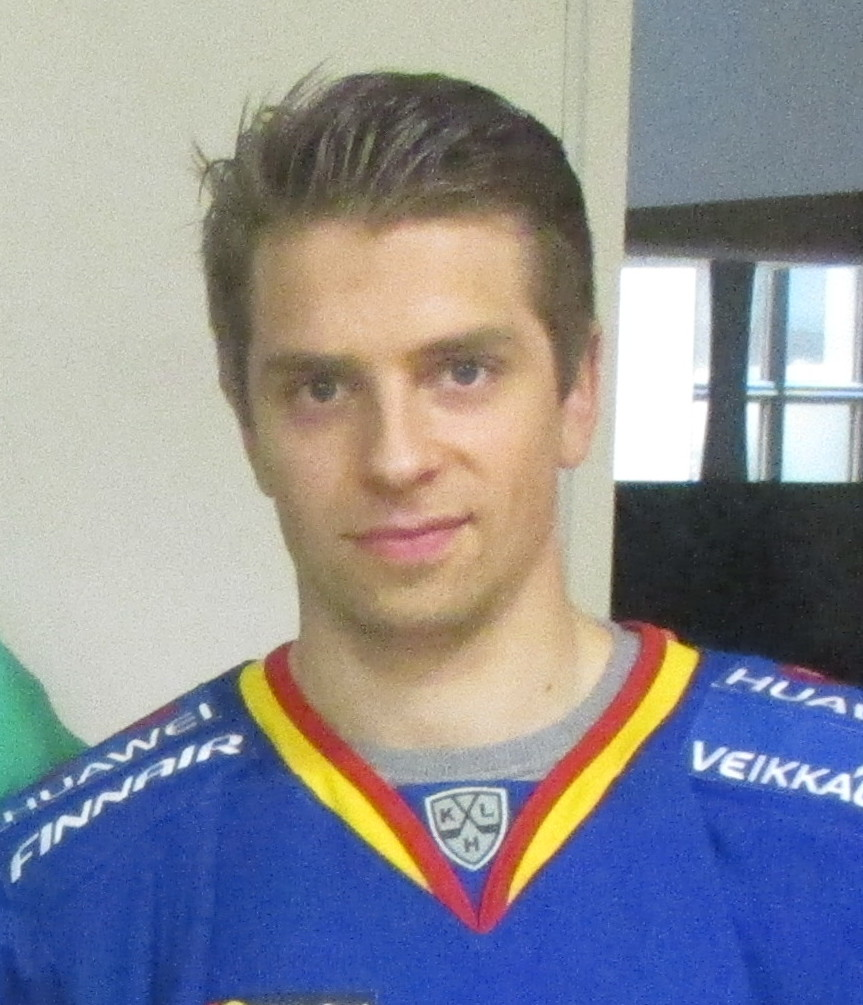
- Born: May 31, 1988 (age 37) Pori, Finland
- Height: 5 ft 11 in (180 cm)
- Weight: 161 lb (73 kg; 11 st 7 lb)
- Position: Right wing
- Shoots: Right
- team Former teams: Free agent KalPa; Torpedo Nizhny Novgorod; HC Fribourg-Gottéron; Växjö Lakers; Jokerit; Dynamo Moscow; Ässät; HIFK; Örebro HK
- National team: Finland
- Playing career: 2007–present

Sakari Jalmari Salminen (born May 31, 1988) is a Finnish professional ice hockey player. He is currently an unrestricted free agent who most recently played for Örebro HK in the Swedish Hockey League (SHL).

== Playing career ==
Salminen played in his native Finland for Liiga clubs, Porin Ässät and KalPa before signing a two-year contract with Torpedo Nizhny Novgorod of the Kontinental Hockey League (KHL) on May 21, 2013. When his contract with Nizhny Novgorod was up, he moved to HC Fribourg-Gottéron of the Swiss National League A (NLA) for the 2015–16 season. He parted company with the club in late January 2016 and signed with the Växjö Lakers of the Swedish Hockey League (SHL) shortly after to finish the season with the team.

In April 2016, he inked a one-year deal with Jokerit of the Kontinental Hockey League. In the 2016–17 season, Salminen appeared in 56 games for Jokerit, registering 6 goals and 26 points.

With Jokerit opting not to continue their option with Salminen, he agreed to a one-year contract to remain in the KHL with Russian outfit, HC Dynamo Moscow, on September 15, 2017.

== International play ==
Salminen was selected to the Finnish National Team that won a bronze medal at the 2014 Winter Olympics in Sochi.

== Career statistics ==
=== Regular season and playoffs ===
			Regular season					Playoffs
Season	Team	League	GP	G	A	Pts	PIM	GP	G	A	Pts	PIM
2004–05	Ässät	FIN U18	26	8	7	15	12	—	—	—	—	—
2005–06	Ässät	FIN U18	20	20	16	36	6	8	6	10	16	6
2005–06	Ässät	FIN U20	19	4	9	13	10	—	—	—	—	—
2006–07	Ässät	FIN U20	31	21	30	51	32	—	—	—	—	—
2007–08	Ässät	FIN U20	12	18	5	23	4	12	5	10	15	4
2007–08	Ässät	SM-l	30	3	10	13	2	—	—	—	—	—
2007–08	Jukurit	Mestis	8	1	5	6	0	—	—	—	—	—
2008–09	Ässät	SM-l	55	16	14	30	16	—	—	—	—	—
2009–10	Ässät	SM-l	52	12	13	25	20	—	—	—	—	—
2010–11	KalPa	SM-l	57	12	33	45	10	7	4	2	6	29
2011–12	KalPa	SM-l	54	24	23	47	16	7	1	6	7	0
2012–13	KalPa	SM-l	54	26	29	55	18	5	2	2	4	0
2013–14	Torpedo Nizhny Novgorod	KHL	54	18	30	48	16	7	3	2	5	4
2014–15	Torpedo Nizhny Novgorod	KHL	60	18	29	47	30	5	0	1	1	0
2015–16	HC Fribourg–Gottéron	NLA	43	10	15	25	10	—	—	—	—	—
2015–16	Växjö Lakers	SHL	12	4	2	6	6	13	3	3	6	4
2016–17	Jokerit	KHL	56	6	20	26	16	4	0	0	0	2
2017–18	Dynamo Moscow	KHL	18	2	6	8	12	—	—	—	—	—
2017–18	Ässät	Liiga	15	7	9	16	16	7	1	2	3	0
2018–19	Ässät	Liiga	35	10	21	31	18	—	—	—	—	—
2018–19	HIFK	Liiga	22	5	7	12	8	12	4	3	7	6
2019–20	Örebro HK	SHL	45	8	16	24	26	—	—	—	—	—
2020–21	Ässät	Liiga	11	2	0	2	12	—	—	—	—	—
2021–22	Ässät	Liiga	55	7	26	33	30	—	—	—	—	—
SM-l/Liiga totals			440	124	185	309	166	38	12	15	27	35
KHL totals			188	44	85	129	74	16	3	3	6	6

=== International ===
Medal record

Ice hockey

Representing Finland

Olympic Games
Bronze medal – third place	2014 Sochi	

Year	Team	Event	GP	G	A	Pts	PIM
2008	Finland	WJC	6	1	3	4	4
2013	Finland	WC	10	1	2	3	0
2014	Finland	OG	2	0	0	0	4
Junior totals			6	1	3	4	4
Senior totals			12	1	2	3	4
