= Niklas Persson =

Swedish ice hockey player

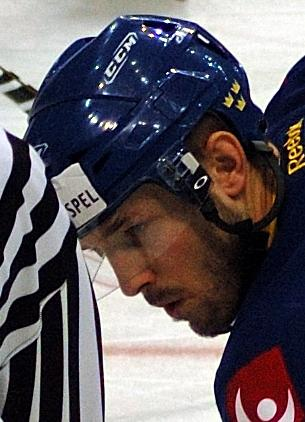
- Born: March 26, 1979 (age 47) Ösmo, Sweden
- Height: 6 ft 2 in (188 cm)
- Weight: 205 lb (93 kg; 14 st 9 lb)
- Position: Centre/Right wing
- Shot: Left
- Played for: Leksands IF; Linköpings HC; Neftekhimik Nizhnekamsk; CSKA Moscow; Rapperswil-Jona Lakers
- National team: Sweden
- Playing career: 1997–2019

Niklas Persson (born March 26, 1979) is a Swedish former professional ice hockey player who most notably played as captain for Linköpings HC in the Swedish Hockey League (SHL). He is the current president of hockey operations with Linköpings HC.

Persson retired from hockey in 2018 after playing more than 600 SHL games. After a brief return to playing with Mjölby HC in the Division 2, Persson continued to work within Linköpings HC, given the role of assistant general manager before assuming the general manager's role to begin the 2019–20 season.

Persson is the cousin of Robert Nilsson who also plays professional ice hockey.

== Career statistics ==
=== Regular season and playoffs ===
			Regular season					Playoffs
Season	Team	League	GP	G	A	Pts	PIM	GP	G	A	Pts	PIM
1994–95	Huddinge IK	J20	3	0	0	0	0	—	—	—	—	—
1995–96	Leksands IF	J20	8	1	2	3	0	—	—	—	—	—
1996–97	Leksands IF	J20	29	18	15	33	12	—	—	—	—	—
1997–98	Leksands IF	J20	20	10	12	22	30	—	—	—	—	—
1997–98	Leksands IF	SEL	17	2	3	5	4	2	0	0	0	0
1998–99	Leksands IF	SEL	47	1	2	3	6	1	0	0	0	0
1999–00	Leksands IF	SEL	49	2	5	7	34	—	—	—	—	—
2000–01	Leksands IF	SEL	48	3	4	7	43	—	—	—	—	—
2001–02	Leksands IF	Allsv	42	9	13	22	50	9	9	2	11	16
2002–03	Leksands IF	SEL	49	4	21	25	51	5	0	0	0	10
2003–04	Leksands IF	SEL	50	14	19	33	42	—	—	—	—	—
2004–05	Leksands IF	Allsv	43	15	23	38	36	10	2	5	7	8
2005–06	Leksands IF	SEL	34	7	10	17	30	—	—	—	—	—
2006–07	Linköpings HC	SEL	55	15	17	32	32	15	5	9	14	6
2007–08	Linköpings HC	SEL	54	10	22	32	44	15	3	6	9	10
2008–09	Linköpings HC	SEL	55	21	21	42	38	7	4	4	8	4
2009–10	Neftekhimik Nizhnekamsk	KHL	55	13	25	38	30	7	0	1	1	2
2010–11	Neftekhimik Nizhnekamsk	KHL	39	3	12	15	32	7	1	2	3	2
2011–12	CSKA Moscow	KHL	53	6	18	24	28	5	1	1	2	6
2012–13	CSKA Moscow	KHL	42	8	11	19	14	7	0	0	0	4
2013–14	Rapperswil–Jona Lakers	NLA	45	11	18	29	16	—	—	—	—	—
2014–15	Rapperswil–Jona Lakers	NLA	43	17	22	39	16	—	—	—	—	—
2015–16	Linköpings HC	SHL	50	8	17	25	16	6	2	0	2	0
2016–17	Linköpings HC	SHL	50	7	15	22	16	6	0	1	1	4
2017–18	Linköpings HC	SHL	52	3	11	14	32	7	0	0	0	2
2018–19	Mjölby HC	Div.2	1	1	1	2	2	1	0	0	0	2
SHL totals			610	97	167	264	388	64	14	20	34	36
KHL totals			189	30	66	96	104	26	2	4	6	14

Medal record

Ice hockey

Representing Sweden

World Championships
Gold medal – first place	2013 Sweden/Finland	
Silver medal – second place	2011 Slovakia	
Bronze medal – third place	2009 Switzerland	
Bronze medal – third place	2010 Germany	

=== International ===
Year	Team	Event	Result	GP	G	A	Pts	PIM
1997	Sweden	EJC18	2nd place, silver medalist(s)	5	0	0	0	2
1998	Sweden	WJC	6th	7	0	2	2	10
1999	Sweden	WJC	4th	6	2	2	4	2
2009	Sweden	WC	3rd place, bronze medalist(s)	9	2	4	6	4
2010	Sweden	WC	3rd place, bronze medalist(s)	9	0	4	4	0
2011	Sweden	WC	2nd place, silver medalist(s)	8	3	0	3	8
2012	Sweden	WC	6th	8	2	1	3	2
2013	Sweden	WC	1st place, gold medalist(s)	9	0	2	2	2
Junior totals				18	2	4	6	14
Senior totals				43	7	11	18	16
