= Egor Averin =

Russian professional ice hockey forward

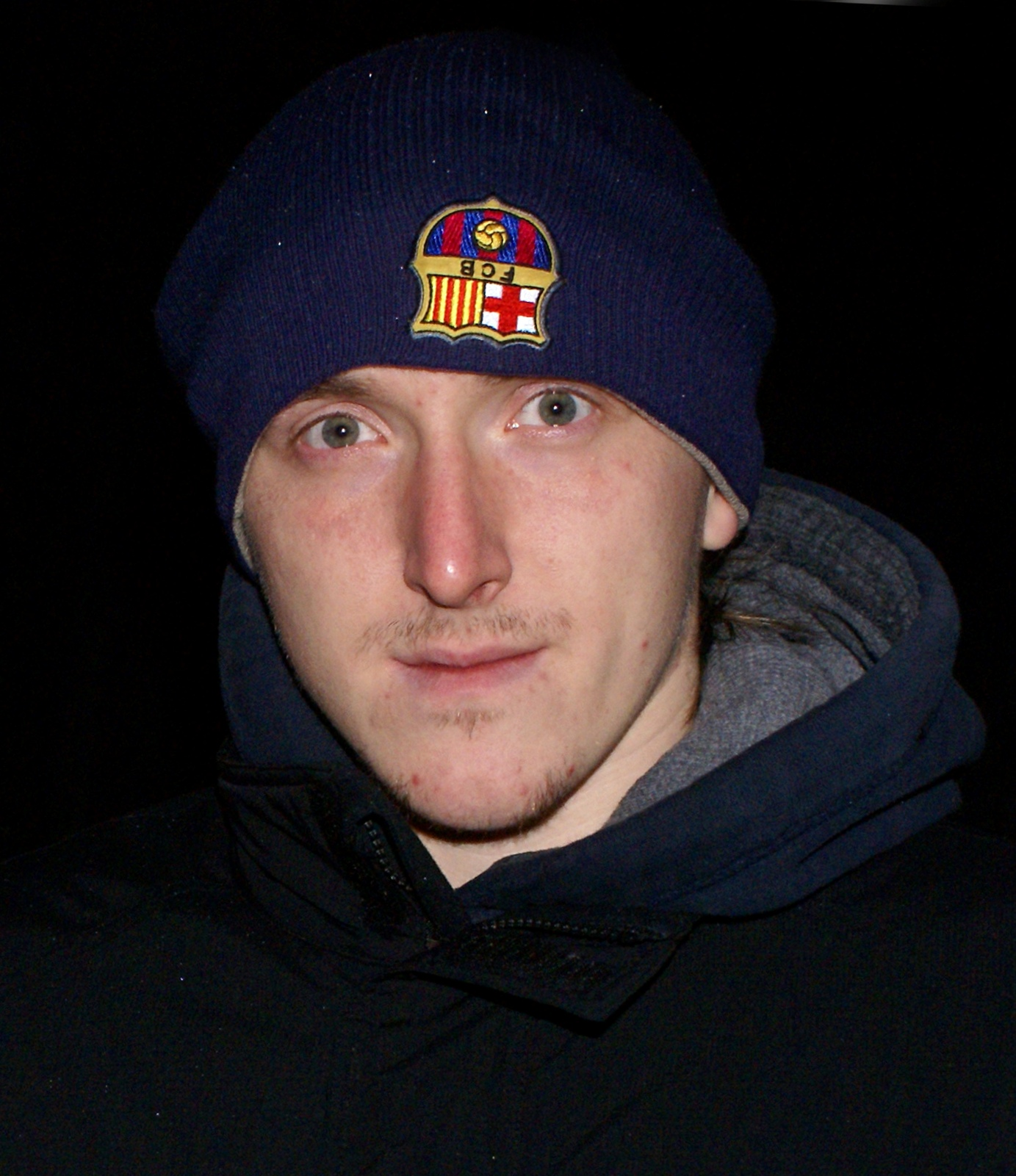
- Born: August 25, 1989 (age 35); Omsk, Russia
- Height: 6 ft 0 in (183 cm)
- Weight: 176 lb (80 kg; 12 st 8 lb)
- Position: Forward
- Shoots: Left
- KHL team Former teams: Free agent Avangard Omsk; Lokomotiv Yaroslavl
- Playing career: 2007–present

Medal record

Ice hockey

Representing Russia

IIHF World U18 Championship
Gold medal – first place	2007 Finland	

World Junior A Challenge
Bronze medal – third place	2006 Yorkton	

Egor Valeryevich Averin (Russian: Его́р Вале́рьевич Аве́рин; born August 25, 1989) is a Russian professional ice hockey forward who is currently an unrestricted free agent. He most recently played for Lokomotiv Yaroslavl of the Kontinental Hockey League (KHL).
