= Zbyněk Irgl =

Czech ice hockey player

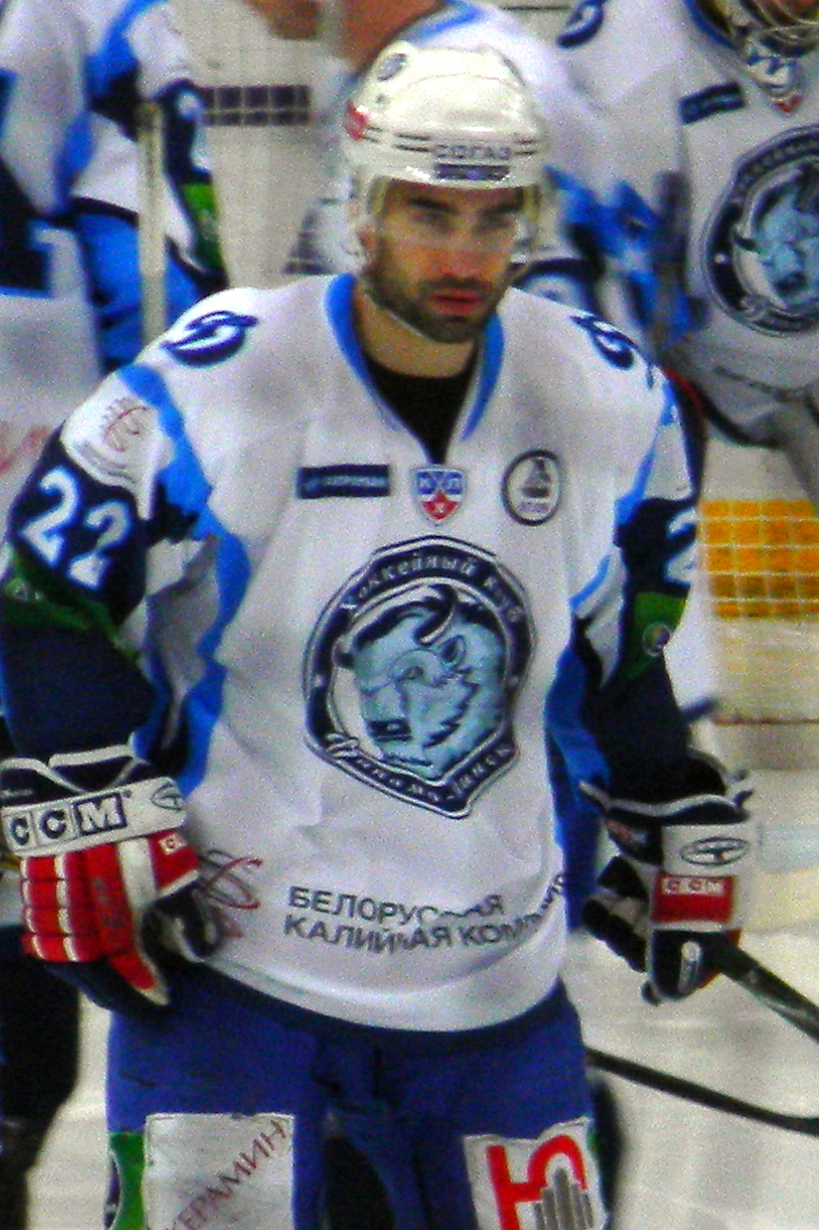
- Born: November 29, 1980 (age 45) Ostrava, Czechoslovakia
- Height: 5 ft 11 in (180 cm)
- Weight: 176 lb (80 kg; 12 st 8 lb)
- Position: Left wing
- Shot: Right
- Czech team Former teams: HC Olomouc; HC Vítkovice; HC Davos; Lokomotiv Yaroslavl; Atlant Moscow Oblast; HC Dinamo Minsk; HC Oceláři Třinec
- National team: Czech Republic
- NHL draft: 197th overall, 2000; Nashville Predators
- Playing career: 1998–2022

Zbyněk Irgl (born November 29, 1980) is a Czech professional ice hockey player currently with HC Olomouc of the Czech Extraliga.

Irgl was selected 197th overall by the Nashville Predators in round 6 of the 2000 NHL entry draft. The Predators had received the pick from the St. Louis Blues in a trade for Blair Atcheynum. The selection meant little for the Predators as Irgl has played his entire professional career in Europe, first in the Czech Extraliga for HC Vítkovice, in 2007-2010 for Lokomotiv Yaroslavl of the KHL. In 2010-11 Irgl Zbyněk played for Atlant Moscow Oblast of the KHL.

== International play ==
Irgl played his first game for the national team in 2004, and has played 52 times for the Czech national team (as of January 3, 2009.)

== Career statistics ==
=== Regular season and playoffs ===
			Regular season					Playoffs
Season	Team	League	GP	G	A	Pts	PIM	GP	G	A	Pts	PIM
1996–97	HC Vítkovice	CZE U18	43	44	22	66		—	—	—	—	—
1997–98	HC Vítkovice	CZE U20	37	17	10	27		—	—	—	—	—
1998–99	HC Vítkovice	CZE U18
1998–99	HC Vítkovice	ELH	32	2	2	4	6	4	0	0	0	0
1998–99	HC Havířov	CZE.2	1	1	0	1		—	—	—	—	—
1999–2000	HC Vítkovice	ELH	47	7	5	12	12	—	—	—	—	—
1999–2000	HC Dukla Jihlava	CZE.2	1	0	0	0	0	—	—	—	—	—
2000–01	HC Vítkovice	CZE U20	2	4	1	5	0	2	2	2	4	2
2000–01	HC Vítkovice	ELH	37	0	1	1	8	4	0	0	0	0
2000–01	HC Slezan Opava	CZE.2	9	3	2	5	2	—	—	—	—	—
2001–02	HC Vítkovice	ELH	39	2	8	10	8	13	4	0	4	6
2002–03	HC Vítkovice	ELH	51	6	7	13	14	5	0	1	1	0
2003–04	HC Vítkovice	ELH	51	19	16	35	18	4	1	0	1	6
2004–05	HC Vítkovice	ELH	50	21	10	31	51	11	1	1	2	33
2005–06	HC Vítkovice Steel	ELH	50	16	17	33	54	6	3	3	6	4
2006–07	HC Vítkovice Steel	ELH	51	25	11	36	56	—	—	—	—	—
2006–07	HC Davos	NLA	—	—	—	—	—	15	8	4	12	20
2007–08	Lokomotiv Yaroslavl	RSL	54	18	10	28	24	16	10	3	13	20
2008–09	Lokomotiv Yaroslavl	KHL	54	18	19	37	22	17	8	6	14	10
2009–10	Lokomotiv Yaroslavl	KHL	46	20	14	34	18	17	3	7	10	12
2010–11	Atlant Moscow Oblast	KHL	51	10	7	17	24	19	1	4	5	18
2011–12	Dinamo Minsk	KHL	53	16	24	40	22	4	0	0	0	4
2012–13	Dinamo Minsk	KHL	51	12	16	28	34	—	—	—	—	—
2013–14	Dinamo Minsk	KHL	49	9	11	20	12	—	—	—	—	—
2014–15	HC Oceláři Třinec	ELH	19	11	8	19	10	9	2	2	4	8
2015–16	HC Oceláři Třinec	ELH	47	14	18	32	30	—	—	—	—	—
2016–17	HC Oceláři Třinec	ELH	50	12	16	28	28	3	0	0	0	2
2017–18	HC Oceláři Třinec	ELH	33	5	5	10	14	—	—	—	—	—
2017–18	HC Olomouc	ELH	14	4	4	8	4	9	4	4	8	2
2018–19	HC Olomouc	ELH	42	22	8	30	26	7	1	1	2	0
2019–20	HC Olomouc	ELH	50	15	22	37	32	2	0	0	0	2
2020–21	HC Vítkovice Ridera	ELH	20	5	4	9	2	1	0	0	0	0
2021–22	MSK Orlová U21	CZE.4	1	0	0	0	0	—	—	—	—	—
ELH totals			683	186	162	348	373	78	16	12	28	63
KHL totals			304	85	91	176	132	57	12	17	29	44

=== International ===
Year	Team	Event	GP	G	A	Pts	PIM
1998	Czech Republic	EJC	6	2	3	5	5
2000	Czech Republic	WJC	7	2	1	3	6
2006	Czech Republic	WC	6	2	2	4	0
2007	Czech Republic	WC	7	2	2	4	4
2008	Czech Republic	WC	7	1	2	3	2
2009	Czech Republic	WC	5	0	0	0	2
2013	Czech Republic	WC	8	2	1	3	0
Junior totals			13	4	4	8	10
Senior totals			33	7	7	14	8
