= Vasily Koshechkin =

Russian ice hockey player (born 1983)

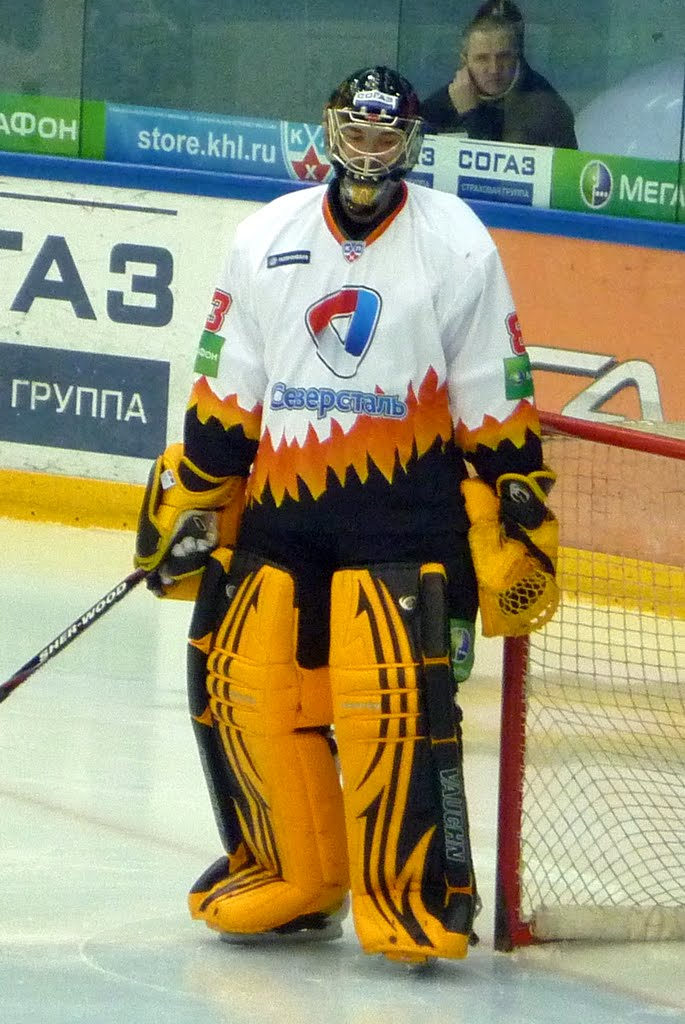
- Koshechkin with Severstal Cherepovets in 2010
- Born: 27 March 1983 (age 43) Tolyatti, Russian SFSR, Soviet Union
- Height: 6 ft 7 in (201 cm)
- Weight: 231 lb (105 kg; 16 st 7 lb)
- Position: Goaltender
- Caught: Left
- Played for: HC Lada Togliatti; Ak Bars Kazan; Metallurg Magnitogorsk; Severstal Cherepovets
- National team: Russia
- NHL draft: 233rd overall, 2002; Tampa Bay Lightning
- Playing career: 1998–2023

Vasily Vladimirovich Koshechkin (Russian: Василий Владимирович Кошечкин; born 27 March 1983) is a Russian former professional ice hockey goaltender who played exclusively in the Kontinental Hockey League (KHL).

== Playing career ==
Koshechkin started his professional hockey career as the backup goaltender of Lada Togliatti, RSL.

He took over as the number-one goaltender in the 2005–06 season, playing 41 out of 51 regular season games. With 3 goals against and 1 shutout in 3 games, he also actively contributed to the latest international achievement of his team, a 2005–06 Continental Cup win. He had spent three seasons with Severstal Cherepovets before he moved to Metallurg Magnitogorsk for a second stint.

Although Koshechkin was drafted by the Tampa Bay Lightning in the 2002 NHL entry draft, he has never left the KHL in his career. Following the conclusion of the 2022–23 season, Koshechkin announced his retirement from professional hockey after twenty-five professional seasons, on 27 March 2023, ending his career as the KHL's all-time record holder for goaltenders with 378 wins, 90 shutouts in 765 appearances.

== International play ==
Medal record

ice hockey

Representing Olympic Athletes from Russia

Olympic Games
Gold medal – first place	2018 Pyeongchang	

Representing Russia

World Championships
Gold medal – first place	2009 Switzerland	
Silver medal – second place	2010 Germany	
Bronze medal – third place	2007 Russia	

During the 2006–07 season, Koshechkin was invited to represent the Russian national team. He was named a reserve player for the 2010 Winter Olympics, though he didn't play in the tournament. He was next invited to the 2010 IIHF World Championship. He was a member of the Olympic Athletes from Russia team at the 2018 Winter Olympics.

== Career statistics ==
=== Regular season ===
Season	Team	League	GP	W	L	T	MIN	GA	SO	GAA	SV%
2003–04	Lada Togliatti	RSL	8				247	10	0	2.43	.888
2004–05	Lada Togliatti	RSL	4				121	5	0	2.48	.868
2005–06	Lada Togliatti	RSL	41				2376	64	9	1.62	.938
2006–07	Lada Togliatti	RSL	42				2429	82	5	2.02	.923
2007–08	Ak Bars Kazan	RSL	19				990	45	0	2.73
2008-09	Lada Togliatti	KHL	43	21	16	6	2404	66	8	1.65	.934
2009-10	Lada Togliatti	KHL	23	8	9	6	1305	46	2	2.12	.921
2009–10	Metallurg Magnitogorsk	KHL	26	17	7	2	1536	47	6	1.84	.932
2010-11	Severstal Cherepovets	KHL	32	15	14	3	1809	88	2	2.92	.906
2011-12	Severstal Cherepovets	KHL	34	12	11	5	1795	71	6	2.37	.925
2012-13	Severstal Cherepovets	KHL	51	22	20	9	3102	110	8	2.13	.923

=== International ===
Year	Team	Event	GP	W	L	T / OT	MIN	GA	SO	GAA	SV%
2007	Russia	WC	3	3	0	0	180:00	8	0	2.67	.879
2009	Russia	WC	0	-	-	-	-	-	-	-	-
2010	Russia	Oly	0	-	-	-	-	-	-	-	-
2010	Russia	WC	3	3	0	0	180:00	3	0	1.00	.967
2011	Russia	WC	0	-	-	-	-	-	-	-	-
