= 2022 Carlson Hockey Games =

2022 Carlson Hockey Games (Euro Hockey Games)
Tournament details
- Host countries: Czechia; Austria
- Cities: Ostrava; Vienna
- Venues: 2 (in 2 host cities)
- Dates: 28 April - 1 May 2022
- Teams: 4

Final positions
- Champions: Czech Republic (9th title)
- Runners-up: Sweden
- Third place: Finland
- Fourth place: Austria

Tournament statistics
- Games played: 6
- Goals scored: 32 (5.33 per game)
- Attendance: 33,673 (5,612 per game)
- Scoring leader: (Czech Republic) David Sklenička (4 points)

The 2022 Carlson Hockey Games was played between 28 April and 1 May 2022. The Czech Republic, Finland, Sweden and Austria played a round-robin for a total of three games per team and six games in total. Five of the games were played in Ostrava, Czech Republic and one game in Vienna, Austria. The tournament was won by Czech Republic.The tournament was part of the 2021–22 Euro Hockey Tour.

== Standings ==
Pos	Team	Pld	W	OTW	OTL	L	GF	GA	GD	Pts
1	Czech Republic	3	2	0	1	0	14	6	+8	7
2	Sweden	3	2	0	0	1	6	9	−3	6
3	Finland	3	1	1	0	1	6	5	+1	5
4	Austria	3	0	0	0	3	3	9	−6	0

Source: eurohockey.com

== Games ==
All times are local. Prague – (Central European Summer Time – UTC+2) Vienna – (Central European Summer Time – UTC+2)

28 April 2022; 17:30	Finland	2-1 GWS (1-0, 0-1, 0-0) (OT: 0–0) (SO: 1–0)	Czech Republic	Ostravar Aréna, Ostrava; Attendance: 8,342

Game reference
Jussi Olkinuora	Goalies	Štěpán Lukeš	Referees: (Sweden) Andreas Harnebring (Sweden) Christoffer Holm
15:20 – Teemu Hartikainen (Sakari Manninen, Jere Innala) / 1-0; / 1-1 / 38:45 – Jiří Černoch (Roman Cervenka, Jiří Smejkal)			Referees: (Sweden) Andreas Harnebring (Sweden) Christoffer Holm
Manninen	Shootout		Referees: (Sweden) Andreas Harnebring (Sweden) Christoffer Holm
8 min	Penalties	6 min	Referees: (Sweden) Andreas Harnebring (Sweden) Christoffer Holm
31	Shots	33	Referees: (Sweden) Andreas Harnebring (Sweden) Christoffer Holm

28 April 2001; 19:00	Sweden	1-0 (0-0, 0-0, 1-0)	Austria	Steffl Arena, Vienna; Attendance: 3,000

Game reference
[[]]	Goalies	[[]]	Referees: (Austria) Stefan Siegel (Czech Republic) Ladislav Smetana
45:38 – Linus Karlsson (Calle Själin, Lucas Wallmark) / 1-0			Referees: (Austria) Stefan Siegel (Czech Republic) Ladislav Smetana
2 min	Penalties	8 min	Referees: (Austria) Stefan Siegel (Czech Republic) Ladislav Smetana
33	Shots	34	Referees: (Austria) Stefan Siegel (Czech Republic) Ladislav Smetana

30 April 2022; 12:00	Austria	2-4 (0-2, 2-1, 0-1)	Finland	Ostravar Aréna, Ostrava; Attendance: 4,192

Game reference

David Kickert
Goalies
Frans Tuohimaa
Referees:
(Czech Republic) Daniel Pražák
(Czech Republic) Adam Kika

	0-1	13:27 – Jere Innala (Miro Aaltonen, Mikko Lehtonen) (PP)
	0-2	15:22 – Harri Pesonen (Jere Sallinen)
	0-3	21:14 – Jere Innala (Harri Pesonen, Mikko Lehtonen)
28:49 – Dominic Zwerger (Brian Lebler, Benjamin Baumgartner)	1-3
33:47 – Brian Lebler (Dominic Zwerger, Benjamin Baumgartner)	2-3
	2-4	49:11 – Niko Ojamäki (Toni Rajala, Oliwer Kaski)

8 min
Penalties
2 min
17
Shots
39

30 April 2022; 16:00	Czech Republic	9-3 (3-1, 4-2, 2-0)	Sweden	Ostravar Aréna, Ostrava; Attendance: 8,848

Game reference

Marek Langhamer
Goalies
Jhonas Enroth
Referees:
(Czech Republic) Ladislav Smetana
(Czech Republic) Andris Ansons

01:57 – David Sklenička (Hynek Zohorna, David Jiříček)	1-0
	1-1	04:49 – Oskar Lang (Nils Åman, Henrik Tömmernes)
09:19 – David Jiricek (Roman Červenka, Jiří Smejkal)	2-1
11:34 – Libor Šulák (Matěj Blümel, Jakub Krejčík)	3-1
23:15 – Hynek Zohorna (Petr Holik)	4-1
	4-2	25:19 – Joel Kellman (Calle Själin, Jesper Pettersson)
	4-3	28:06 – Fredrik Olofsson (Kim Rosdahl, Patrik Karlkvist)
29:04 – Petr Holik (Hynek Zohorna)	5-3
29:26 – David Sklenička (Patrik Zdráhal, Petr Holik)	6-3
32:57 – Petr Holík (Matěj Blümel, Roman Červenka)	7-3
45:40 – Vojtěch Budík (Jakub Flek, Ondřej Beránek)	8-3
48:30 – Jakub Flek (Ondřej Beránek, Petr Kodýtek)	9-3

6 min
Penalties
4 min
35
Shots
28

1 May 2022; 12:00	Sweden	2-0 (1-0, 1-0, 0-0)	Finland	Ostravar Aréna, Ostrava; Attendance: 3,571

Game reference
Marcus Högberg	Goalies	Jussi Olkinuora	Referees: (Czech Republic) René Hradil (Czech Republic) Antonín Jeřábek
08:48 – Elmer Söderblom (Filip Roos, Jonathan Pudas) / 1-0; 30:40 – Filip Roos (Fredrik Olofsson) / 2-0			Referees: (Czech Republic) René Hradil (Czech Republic) Antonín Jeřábek
6 min	Penalties	12 min	Referees: (Czech Republic) René Hradil (Czech Republic) Antonín Jeřábek
28	Shots	21	Referees: (Czech Republic) René Hradil (Czech Republic) Antonín Jeřábek

1 May 2022; 12:00	Czech Republic	4-1 (1-0, 2-1, 1-0)	Austria	Ostravar Aréna, Ostrava; Attendance: 5,720

Game reference

Štěpán Lukeš
Goalies
Bernhard Starkbaum
Referees:
(Czech Republic) Robin Šír
(Czech Republic) Andris Ansons

04:15 – David Sklenička (Vojtěch Budík, Jiří Černoch) (SHG)	1-0
30:56 – David Jiříček (Matěj Blümel, Jakub Flek) (PP)	2-0
	2-1	31:34 – Benjamin Nissner (Bernd Wolf, Erik Kirchschläger)
00:00 – [[]] ([[]], [[]])	3-1
00:00 – [[]] ([[]], [[]])	4-1

6 min
Penalties
6 min
28
Shots
21

== Scoring leaders ==
Pos	Player	Country	GP	G	A	Pts	+/−	PIM	POS
1	David Sklenička	Czech Republic	3	3	1	4	+5	2	D
2	Petr Holík	Czech Republic	3	2	2	4	+3	0	F
3	David Jiříček	Czech Republic	3	2	2	4	+3	0	F
4	Jakub Flek	Czech Republic	3	0	4	4	+2	0	F
5	Matěj Blümel	Czech Republic	3	0	4	4	+1	0	F

GP = Games played; G = Goals; A = Assists; Pts = Points; +/− = Plus/minus; PIM = Penalties in minutes; POS = Position
Source: quanthockey
