= Aalto =

- Language: Finnish

Origin
- Meaning: wave
- Region of origin: Finland

Other names
- Variant form: Aaltonen

Aalto is a Finnish Laine type surname meaning "wave". Notable people with the surname include:

- Aino Aalto (1894–1949), Finnish architect and designer
- Alec Aalto (1942–2018), Finnish diplomat
- Alvar Aalto (1898–1976), Finnish architect and designer
- Anna-Kaarina Aalto (1920–1994), Finnish physician and politician
- Antti Aalto (ice hockey) (born 1975), Finnish ice hockey player
- Antti Aalto (born 1995), Finnish ski jumper
- Artturi Aalto (1876–1937), Finnish politician
- Arvo Aalto (1932–2025), Finnish politician
- Ashprihanal Pekka Aalto (born 1970), Finnish runner
- Eeli Aalto (born 1931), Finnish artist, director and writer
- Einari Aalto (1926–1985), Finnish swimmer
- Elissa Aalto (1922–1994), Finnish architect
- Hanna-Katri Aalto (born 1978), Finnish professional tennis player
- Heikki Aalto (born 1961), Finnish ice hockey player
- Henri Aalto (born 1989), Finnish football player
- Iiro Aalto (born 1977), Finnish footballer
- Ilari Aalto (born 1990), Finnish archaeologist
- Ilmari Aalto (1891–1934), Finnish painter
- Jorma Aalto (born 1957), Finnish skier
- Jussi Aalto (born 1983), Finnish footballer
- Jussi Aalto (photographer) (born 1945), Finnish photographer
- Jyri Aalto (born 1969), Finnish badminton player
- Kalle Aalto (1884–1950), Finnish politician
- Kathryn Aalto, American landscape designer
- Marja-Sisko Aalto (born 1954) Finnish minister of the Evangelical Lutheran Church
- Marjatta Aalto (born 1939), Finnish mycologist
- Minna Aalto (born 1965), Finnish sailor
- Pauliina Aalto (born 1967), Finnish ten-pin bowling player
- Pentti Aalto (1917–1998), Finnish linguist
- Pirjo Aalto (born 1961), Finnish biathlete
- Saara Aalto (born 1987), Finnish singer
- Simo Aalto (born 1960), Finnish stage magician
- Susanne Aalto (born 1964), Swedish professor
- Teemu Aalto (born 1978), Finnish ice hockey player
- Toivo Aalto-Setälä (1896–1977), Finnish lawyer and politician
- Touko Aalto (born 1984), Finnish politician
- William Aalto (1915–1958), American soldier, member of the Lincoln Battalion

== See also ==
- Aaltonen, Virtanen-type counterpart
- Aalto-1, Finnish student satellite developed in Aalto University
- Aalto Theatre, opera house in Essen, Germany, designed by Alvar Aalto
- Aalto University, Finnish university, named after Alvar Aalto
- Aalto Vase, glassware designed by Aino and Alvar Aalto
