= 2022 Sweden Hockey Games =

2022 Beijer Hockey Games (Euro Hockey Tour)
Tournament details
- Host countries: Sweden; Finland
- Cities: Stockholm; Tampere
- Venues: 2 (in 2 host cities)
- Dates: 5–8 May 2022
- Teams: 4

Final positions
- Champions: Czech Republic (2nd title)
- Runners-up: Sweden
- Third place: Switzerland
- Fourth place: Finland

Tournament statistics
- Games played: 6
- Goals scored: 24 (4 per game)
- Attendance: 42,724 (7,121 per game)
- Scoring leader(s): (Finland) Harri Pesonen (Finland) Teemu Hartikainen (4 points)

Official website
- swehockey

The 2021 Beijer Hockey Games was played between 5 and 8 May 2022. The Czech Republic, Finland, Sweden and Switzerland played a round-robin for a total of three games per team and six games in total. One match was played in Tampere, Finland the rest of the matches were played in Stockholm, Sweden. Czech Republic won the tournament. The tournament was part of 2021–22 Euro Hockey Tour.

Switzerland replaced Russia due to the Russian invasion of Ukraine.

== Standings ==
Pos	Team	Pld	W	OTW	OTL	L	GF	GA	GD	Pts
1	Czech Republic	3	3	0	0	0	8	2	+6	9
2	Sweden	3	1	1	0	1	8	7	+1	5
3	Switzerland	3	1	0	1	1	5	8	−3	4
4	Finland	3	0	0	0	3	6	10	−4	0

Source: swehockey

== Games ==
All times are local. Stockholm – (Central European Time – UTC+1) Tammerfors – (Eastern European Time – UTC+2)

5 February 2022; 18:30	Finland	2-3 (0-0, 0-2, 2-1)	Switzerland	Hakametsä, Tampere; Attendance: 9,552

Game reference

Jussi Olkinuora
Goalies
Sandro Aeschlimann
Referees:
(Czech Republic) Antonin Jerabek
(Czech Republic) Jakub Sindel
Linesmen:
(Finland) Hannu Sormunen
(Finland) Niko Jusi

	0-1	27:21 – Riat (Mottet, Moser)
	0-2	39:10 – Riat (Calvin Thurkauf, Moser)
40:52 – Pesonen (Hartikainen, Kaski)	1-2
	1-3	44:17 – Bertschy (Ambühl, Scherwey)
49:01 – Hartikainen (Manninen, Pesonen)	2-3

6 min
Penalties
8 min
16
Shots
32

5 February 2022; 19:00	Czech Republic	2-1 (0-0, 1-0, 1-1)	Sweden	Avicii Arena, Stockholm; Attendance: 8,434

Game reference

Marek Langhamer
Goalies
Magnus Hellberg
Referees:
(Finland) Kristian Vikman
(Finland) Lassi Heikkinen
Linesmen:
(Sweden) Daniel Persson
(Sweden) Anders Nyqvist

33:22 – Sklenicka (Stransky, Smejkal)	1-0
58:28 – Vrana (Scotka, Krejci)	2-0
	2-1	59:41 – Karlsson (Bengtsson, Pudas)

8 min
Penalties
4 min
14
Shots
32

7 February 2022; 12:00	Finland	1-3 (0-0, 0-2, 1-1)	Czech Republic	Avicii Arena, Stockholm; Attendance: 3,172

Game reference

Jussi Olkinuora
Goalies
Karel Vejmelka
Referees:
(Sweden) Andreas Harnebring
(Sweden) Daniel Eriksson
Linesmen:
(Sweden) Ludvig Lundgren
(Sweden) Gustav Jonsson

	0-1	36:37 – Blümel (Cervenka, Šimek)
	0-2	37:06 – Smejkal (Hertl)
48:31 – Palmu (Armia)	1-2
	1-3	59:40 – Krejci

6 min
Penalties
4 min
12
Shots
24

7 February 2022; 19:00	Sweden	3-2 OT (0-2, 0-0, 2-0) (OT: 1–0)	Switzerland	Avicii Arena, Stockholm; Attendance: 9,002

Game reference

Marcus Högberg
Goalies
Reto Berra
Referees:
(Czech Republic) Oldrich Hejduk
(Czech Republic) Daniel Prazak
Linesmen:
(Sweden) Daniel Persson
(Sweden) Andréas Svensson

	0-1	08:31 – Meier (Hischier)
	0-2	19:55 – Moser (Meier, Hischier)
47:04 – Ekman-Larsson (Tömmernes)	1-2
52:11 – Ekman-Larsson (Karlsson, Söderblom)	2-2
62:54 – Tömmernes (Kellman, Asplund)	3-2

8 min
Penalties
10 min
35
Shots
24

8 February 2022; 12:00	Switzerland	0-3 (0-0, 0-0, 0-3)	Czech Republic	Avicii Arena, Stockholm; Attendance: 1,891

Game reference

Sandro Aeschlimann
Goalies
Karel Vejmelka
Referees:
(Sweden) Andreas Harnebring
(Sweden) Daniel Eriksson
Linesmen:
(Sweden) Ludvig Lundgren
(Sweden) Andréas Svensson

0-1	44:34 – Kundratek (Jiricek, Cernoch)
0-2	2:06 – Holik (Krejcik)
0-3	57:29 – Vrana (Hertl, Simon)

6 min
Penalties
10 min
33
Shots
30

8 February 2022; 16:00	Sweden	4-3 (2-1, 1-1, 1-1)	Finland	Avicii Arena, Stockholm; Attendance: 10,673

Game reference

Magnus Hellberg
Goalies
Harri Säteri
Referees:
(Russia)
(Russia)
Linesmen:
(Sweden)
(Sweden)

00:50 – Friberg (Kellman, Asplund)	1-0
05:01 – Nordström (Bemström, Dahlin)	2-0
	2-1	06:58 – Manninen
	2-2	21:24 – Manninen (Hartikainen, Pesonen)
39:42 – Kellman (Asplund, Ekman-Larsson)	3-2
43:07 – Bemström (Tömmernes, Dahlin)	4-2
	4-3	43:16 – Pesonen (Hartikainen)

8 min
Penalties
12 min
34
Shots
19

== Scoring leaders ==
Pos	Player	Country	GP	G	A	Pts	+/−	PIM	POS
1	Harri Pesonen	Finland	2	2	2	4	+5	2	LW
2	Teemu Hartikainen	Finland	2	1	3	4	+4	4	RW
3	Sakari Manninen	Finland	2	2	1	3	+5	0	LW
4	Emil Bemström	Sweden	3	2	1	3	+1	0	RW
5	J.J. Moser	Switzerland	3	1	2	3	+1	2	LD

GP = Games played; G = Goals; A = Assists; Pts = Points; +/− = Plus/minus; PIM = Penalties in minutes; POS = Position
Source: swehockey

== Goaltending leaders ==
Pos	Player	Country	TOI	GA	GAA	Sv%	SO
1	Karel Vejmelka	Czech Republic	120:00	1	0.50	97.78	1
2	Sandro Aeschlimann	Switzerland	117:45	4	2.04	91.11	0
3	Jussi Olkinuora	Finland	118:05	5	2.54	90.91	0
4	Magnus Hellberg	Sweden	124:46	5	2.53	84.85	0

TOI = Time on ice (minutes:seconds); SA = Shots against; GA = Goals against; GAA = Goals Against Average; Sv% = Save percentage; SO = Shutouts
Source: swehockey
