= 2021 Karjala Tournament =

2021 Karjala Tournament (Euro Hockey Games)
Tournament details
- Host countries: Finland; Sweden
- Cities: Helsinki; Linköping
- Venues: 2 (in 2 host cities)
- Dates: 10–14 November 2021
- Teams: 4

Final positions
- Champions: Sweden (5th title)
- Runners-up: Finland
- Third place: Russia
- Fourth place: Czech Republic

Tournament statistics
- Games played: 6
- Goals scored: 29 (4.83 per game)
- Attendance: 39,861 (6,644 per game)
- Scoring leader: (Finland) Miro Aaltonen (5 points)

Official website
- leijonat.com

The 2021 Karjala Tournament was played between 10–14 November 2021. The Czech Republic, Finland, Sweden and Russia played a round-robin for a total of three games per team and six games in total. One game was played in Saab Arena, Linköping, Sweden (Sweden vs Czechia) all the other games were played in Helsinki Halli, Helsinki. Sweden won the tournament. The tournament was part of 2021–22 Euro Hockey Tour.

== Standings ==
Pos	Team	Pld	W	OTW	OTL	L	GF	GA	GD	Pts
1	Sweden	3	3	0	0	0	11	4	+7	9
2	Finland	3	2	0	0	1	8	5	+3	6
3	Russia	3	1	0	0	2	7	9	−2	3
4	Czech Republic	3	0	0	0	3	5	13	−8	0

Source: eurohockey

== Games ==
All times are local. Helsinki – (Eastern European Time – UTC+2) Linköping – (Central European Time – UTC+1)

10 November 2021; 19:00	Sweden	4-1 (2-0, 2-0, 0-1)	Czech Republic	Saab Arena, Linköping; Attendance: 7,482

Game reference

Gustaf Lindvall
Goalies
Petr Kváča
Referees:
(Sweden) Mikael Nord
(Sweden) Mikael Sjöqvist

08:29 – Pontus Holmberg	1-0
14:16 – Carl Klingberg (Anton Lander, Mathias Bromé)	2-0
38:52 – Jesper Olofsson (Henrik Tömmernes, Dennis Everberg) (PP)	3-0
39:27 – Anton Bengtsson (Pontus Holmberg, Christian Djoos)	4-0
	4-1	57:45 – Filip Chlapík (David Sklenička, Pavel Pýcha)

2 min
Penalties
4 min
20
Shots
18

11 November 2021; 18:30	Russia	0-3 (0-0, 0-2, 0-1)	Finland	Helsinki Halli, Helsinki; Attendance: 8,179

Game reference

Dmitry Shugaev
Goalies
Jussi Olkinuora
Referees:
(Finland) Mikko Kaukokari
(Finland) Ilkka Heikkinen

0-1	27:49 – Harri Pesonen (Miro Aaltonen, Sami Vatanen) (PP)
0-2	31:41 – Miro Aaltonen (Sami Vatanen) (PP)
0-3	47:41 – Valtteri Filppula (Miro Aaltonen, Iiro Pakarinen) (PP)

37 min
Penalties
4 min
17
Shots
36

13 November 2021; 14:00	Sweden	4-2 (1-0, 2-2, 1-0)	Russia	Helsinki Halli, Helsinki; Attendance: 1,818

Game reference

Gustaf Lindvall
Goalies
Yaroslav Askarov
Referees:
(Finland) Mikko Kaukokari
(Finland) Kristian Vikman

18:56 – Anton Bengtsson (Fredrik Olofsson, Christian Djoos)	1-0
	1-1	21:17 – Matvey Michkov (Shakir Mukhamadullin, Artem Galimov)
23:42 – Carl Klingberg (Calle Själin, Mathias Bromé)	2-1
	2-2	25:07 – Artem Galimov (Sergei Telegin, Arseni Koromyslov)
34:28 – Anton Lander (Niklas Hansson, Calle Själin)	3-2
46:53 – Carl Klingberg (Anton Lander, Mathias Bromé)	4-2

6 min
Penalties
2 min
27
Shots
16

13 November 2021; 18:00	Finland	4-2 (3-0, 0-2, 1-0)	Czech Republic	Helsinki Halli, Helsinki; Attendance: 9,100

Game reference

Niclas Westerholm
Goalies
~~Miroslav Svoboda~~ Štěpán Lukeš
Referees:
(Sweden) Tobias Björk
(Sweden) Linus Öhlund

01:17 – Toni Rajala (Harri Pesonen, Sami Vatanen)	1-0
13:29 – Niko Ojamäki (Sami Vatanen, Miro Aaltonen) (PP)	2-0
15:33 – Jere Innala (Teemu Tallberg, Vili Saarijärvi)	3-0
	3-1	26:03 – Petr Kodýtek (Ondřej Najman, David Sklenička)
	3-2	38:26 – Matej Blümel (Michael Spacek)
46:35 – Valtteri Filppula (Mikko Lehtonen, Jere Innala)	4-2

8 min
Penalties
6 min
27
Shots
31

14 November 2021; 13:30	Czech Republic	2-5 (0-2, 1-2, 1-1)	Russia	Helsinki Halli, Helsinki; Attendance: 1,076

Game reference

~~Štěpán Lukeš~~ Petr Kváča
Goalies
Dmitry Shugaev
Referees:
(Finland) Ilkka Heikkinen
(Sweden) Linus Öhlund

	0-1	03:16 – Alexander Yelesin (Marat Khusnutdinov, Alexander Nikishin) (PP))
	0-2	17:18 – Dmitri Voronkov (Marat Khusnutdinov, Marat Khusnutdinov, Nikita Chibrikov) (PP)
	0-3	22:29 – Dmitri Voronkov (Matvei Michkov)
	0-4	31:19 – Nikita Tertyshny (Nikita Chibrikov, Ivan Zinchenko)
30:02 – Matej Stransky (Filip Chlapík, Michal Repik) (PP)	1-4
49:20 – David Kaše (Jakub Flek)	2-4
	2-5	57:45 – Artyom Galimov (Dmitri Voronkov, Ivan Zinchenko) (EN)

20 min
Penalties
16 min
40
Shots
35

14 November 2021; 17:30	Finland	1-3 (0-1, 0-2, 1-0)	Sweden	Helsinki Halli, Helsinki; Attendance: 12,206

Game reference

Jussi Olkinuora
Goalies
Lars Johansson
Referees:
(Sweden) Tobias Björk
(Finland) Kristian Vikman

	0-1	14:28 – Anton Lander (Christian Djoos, Carl Klingberg) (PP)
	0-2	35:00 – Jesper Olofsson (Henrik Tömmernes, Leon Bristedt) (PP)
	0-3	38:00 – Henrik Tömmernes (Leon Bristedt) (PP)
42:31 – Heikki Liedes (Miro Aaltonen, Miika Koivisto)	1-3

6 min
Penalties
4 min
30
Shots
22

== Scoring leaders ==
Pos	Player	Country	GP	G	A	Pts	+/−	PIM	POS
1	Miro Aaltonen	Finland	3	1	4	5	+0	4	F
2	Carl Klingberg	Sweden	3	3	1	4	+3	0	F
3	Anton Lander	Sweden	3	2	2	4	+4	0	F
4	Sami Vatanen	Finland	3	0	4	4	+-0	0	D
5	Artyom Galimov	Russia	3	2	1	3	+4	6	F

GP = Games played; G = Goals; A = Assists; Pts = Points; +/− = Plus/minus; PIM = Penalties in minutes; POS = Position
Source: quanthockey
