= Aaltonen =

- Language: Finnish

Origin
- Meaning: derived from aalto ("wave"), and -nen denoting association with/of
- Region of origin: Finland

Other names
- Variant form: Aalto

Aaltonen is a Finnish surname, a Virtanen type analog of Aalto. Notable people with the surname include:

- Aimo Aaltonen (1906–1987), Finnish communist politician
- Ali Aaltonen (1884–1918), Lieutenant in the Imperial Russian army
- Anton Aaltonen (born 2003), Finnish footballer
- Arvo Aaltonen (1892–1949), Finnish swimmer
- Carina Aaltonen (born 1964), Finnish politician
- Emil Aaltonen (1869–1949), Finnish industrialist and philanthropist
- Erkki Aaltonen (1910–1990), Finnish composer
- Erna Aaltonen (born 1951), Finnish ceramist
- Jani Aaltonen (born 1990), Finnish footballer
- Juhamatti Aaltonen (born 1985), Finnish ice hockey player
- Juhani Aaltonen (born 1935), Finnish jazz musician
- Lasse Aaltonen, Finnish World War II ace
- Leevi Aaltonen (born 2001), Finnish ice hockey player
- Mika Aaltonen (born 1965), former Finnish football (soccer) player
- Mikael Aaltonen (born 1991), Finnish ice hockey player
- Minna Aaltonen (born 1966), Finnish actress
- Miro Aaltonen (born 1993), Finnish ice hockey player
- Nico Aaltonen (born 1988), Finnish ice hockey player
- Paavo Aaltonen (1919–1962), Finnish gymnast
- Päivi Aaltonen (born 1952), Finnish female archer
- Patrick Aaltonen (born 1994), Finnish footballer
- Rauno Aaltonen (born 1938), Finnish former professional rally driver
- Remu Aaltonen (born 1948), Finnish member of the Hurriganes rock band
- Risto Aaltonen (1939–2021), Finnish actor
- Samuli Aaltonen (born 2000), Finnish ice hockey player
- Timo Aaltonen (born 1969), Finnish shot putter
- Uma Aaltonen (1940–2009), Finnish author, journalist and former MEP
- Veikko Aaltonen (born 1955), Finnish director, editor, sound editor, production manager and film and television writer and actor
- Wäinö Aaltonen (1894–1966), Finnish artist and sculptor
- Ville Aaltonen (born 1979), Finnish bandy player
