= 2021–22 Euro Hockey Tour =

Tournament details
- Venues: 8 (in 8 host cities)
- Dates: 10 November 2021 – 8 May 2022
- Teams: 7

Final positions
- Champions: Sweden (5th title)
- Runners-up: Finland
- Third place: Czech Republic
- Fourth place: Russia

Tournament statistics
- Games played: 26
- Goals scored: 126 (4.85 per game)
- Attendance: 160,204 (6,162 per game)
- Scoring leader: (Finland) Harri Pesonen (8 points)

The 2021–22 Euro Hockey Tour was the 26th season of Euro Hockey Tour. It started in November 2021 and lasted until May 2022. It consists of Karjala Tournament, Channel One Cup, Carlson Hockey Games and Beijer Hockey Games.

== Standings ==
Pos	Team	Pld	W	OTW	OTL	L	GF	GA	GD	Pts
1	Sweden	12	7	1	0	4	29	26	+3	23
2	Finland	12	4	3	0	5	30	25	+5	18
3	Czech Republic	12	5	0	2	5	33	32	+1	17
4	Russia	7	4	0	1	2	19	17	+2	13
5	Switzerland	3	1	0	1	1	5	8	−3	4
6	Canada	3	1	0	0	2	7	9	−2	3
7	Austria	3	0	0	0	3	3	9	−6	0

Source: Euro Hockey Tour

== Karjala Tournament ==
The Karjala Tournament was played between 10–14 November 2021. Five matches were played in Helsinki, Finland and one match in Linköping, Sweden. Tournament was won by Sweden.

Pos	Team	Pld	W	OTW	OTL	L	GF	GA	GD	Pts
1	Sweden	3	3	0	0	0	11	4	+7	9
2	Finland	3	2	0	0	1	8	5	+3	6
3	Russia	3	1	0	0	2	7	9	−2	3
4	Czech Republic	3	0	0	0	3	5	13	−8	0

Source: Swehockey

10 November 2021
Sweden	4–1	Czech Republic
11 November 2021
Russia	0–3	Finland
13 November 2021
Sweden	4–2	Russia
Finland	4–2	Czech Republic
14 November 2021
Czech Republic	2–5	Russia
Finland	1–3	Sweden

== Channel One Cup ==
The 2021 Channel One Cup was played between 15–19 December 2021. Seven matches were played in Moscow, Russia and one match in Prague, Czech Republic. This tournament also included Canada as well as the regular 4 EHT teams: Czech Republic, Finland, Russia and Sweden. The host nation Russia played 4 matches while the rest of the teams played 3 matches. Places were determined based on a percentage of points scored.

Pos	Team	Pld	W	OTW	OTL	L	GF	GA	GD	Pts
1	Finland	3	1	2	0	0	10	5	+5	7
2	Russia	4	3	0	1	0	12	8	+4	10
3	Canada	3	1	0	0	2	7	9	−2	3
4	Sweden	3	1	0	0	2	4	6	−2	3
5	Czech Republic	3	0	0	1	2	6	11	−5	1

Source: Leijonat.com

15 December 2021
Russia	4–3	Canada
16 December 2021
Sweden	0–1	Russia
Czech Republic	2–3 (GWS)	Finland
17 December 2021
Canada	3–1	Sweden
18 December 2021
Finland	4–1	Canada
Russia	5–2	Czech Republic
19 December 2021
Czech Republic	2–3	Sweden
Russia	2–3 (OT)	Finland

== Carlson Hockey Games ==
The 2022 Carlson Hockey Games was played between 28 April–1 May 2022. Five matches were in Ostrava, Czech Republic and one match in Vienna, Austria. Russia was ejected from the Tour in response to the Russian invasion of Ukraine on 24 February, and was replaced by Austria for this tournament.

Pos	Team	Pld	W	OTW	OTL	L	GF	GA	GD	Pts
1	Czech Republic	3	2	0	1	0	14	6	+8	7
2	Sweden	3	2	0	0	1	6	9	−3	6
3	Finland	3	1	1	0	1	6	5	+1	5
4	Austria	3	0	0	0	3	3	9	−6	0

Source: Leijonat.com

28 April 2022
Finland	2–1 (GWS)	Czech Republic
Sweden	1–0	Austria
30 April 2022
Austria	2–4	Finland
Czech Republic	9–3	Sweden
1 May 2022
Sweden	2–0	Finland
Czech Republic	4–1	Austria

== Beijer Hockey Games ==
The 2022 Beijer Hockey Games was played between 5–8 May 2022. Five matches were in Stockholm, Sweden and one match in Tampere, Finland. Switzerland stood in for Russia for this tournament.

Pos	Team	Pld	W	OTW	OTL	L	GF	GA	GD	Pts
1	Czech Republic	3	3	0	0	0	8	2	+6	9
2	Sweden	3	1	1	0	1	8	7	+1	5
3	Switzerland	3	1	0	1	1	5	8	−3	4
4	Finland	3	0	0	0	3	6	10	−4	0

Source: Leijonat.com

5 February 2022
Finland	2–3	Switzerland
Czech Republic	2–1	Sweden
7 February 2022
Finland	1–3	Czech Republic
Sweden	3–2 (OT)	Switzerland
8 February 2022
Switzerland	0–3	Czech Republic
Sweden	4–3	Finland
