= Jussi Aalto (photographer) =

Finnish photographer (born 1945)

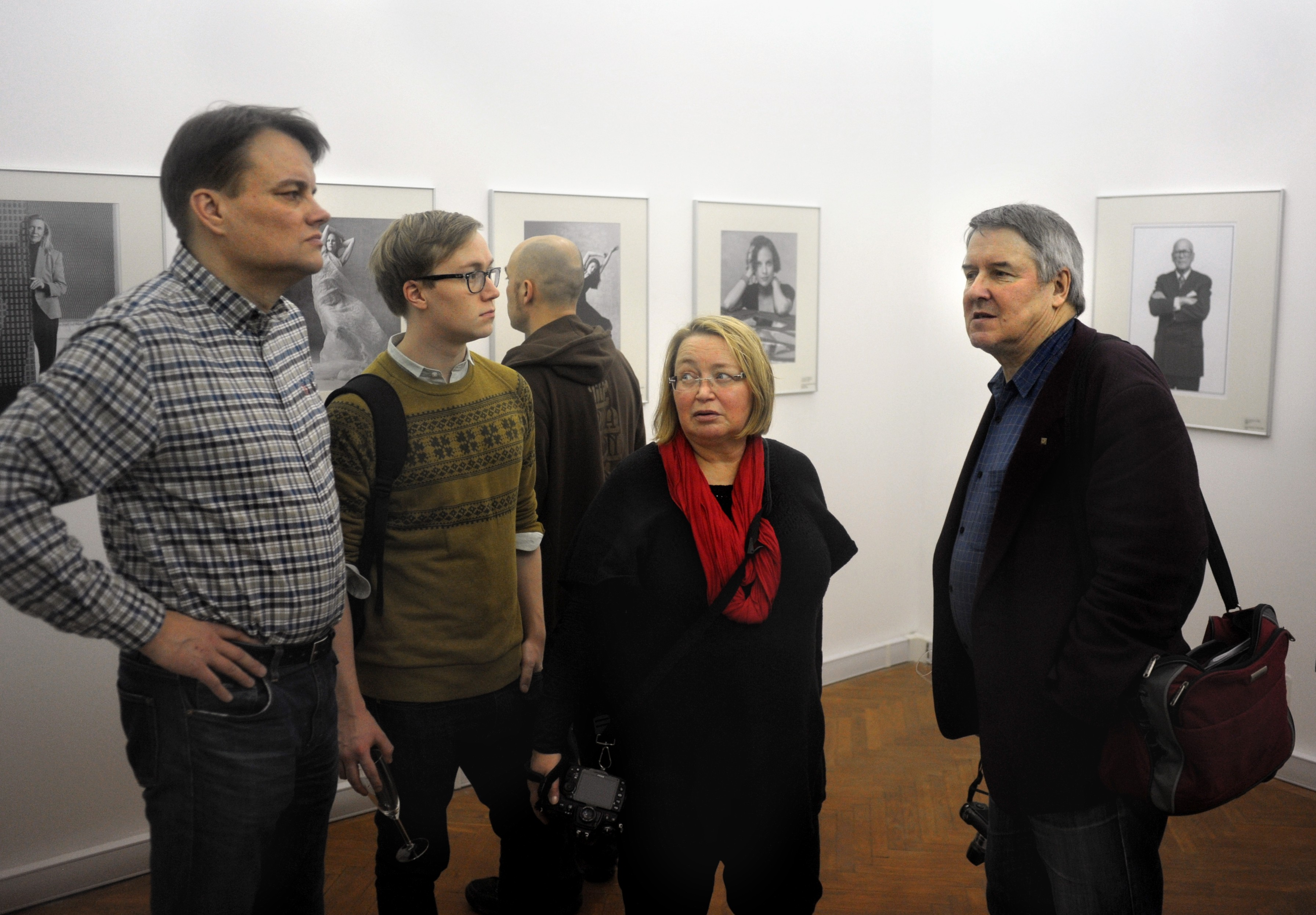
Jussi Aalto (right) with his friends in Saint Petersburg, Russia in 2012.

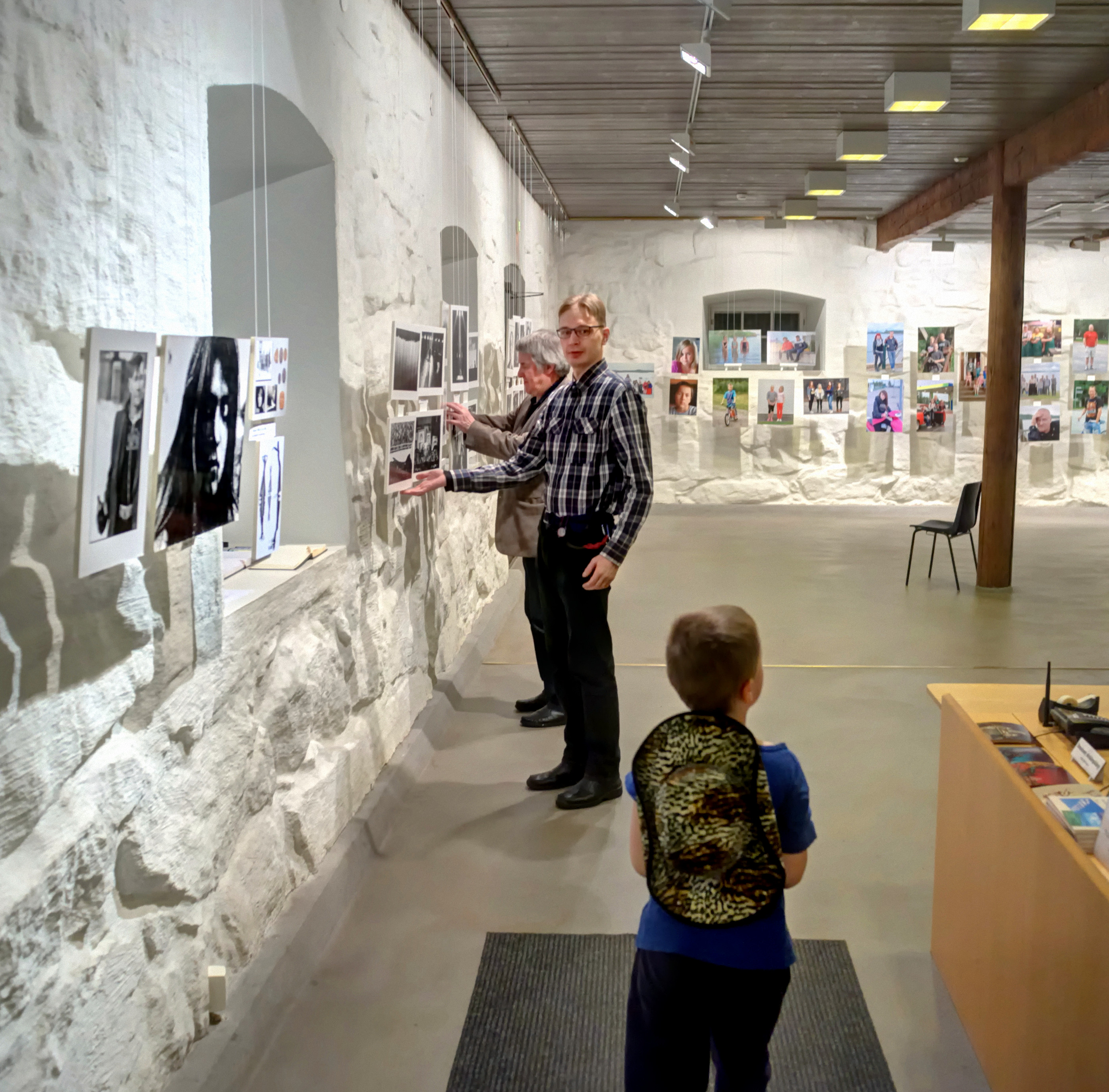
Jussi Aalto (in grey jacket) and director Jirka Veikkanen (in chequered shirt) preparing for the opening of the Galleria Pihatto exhibition at the Photography Centre of Southeastern Finland on 2 February 2016.

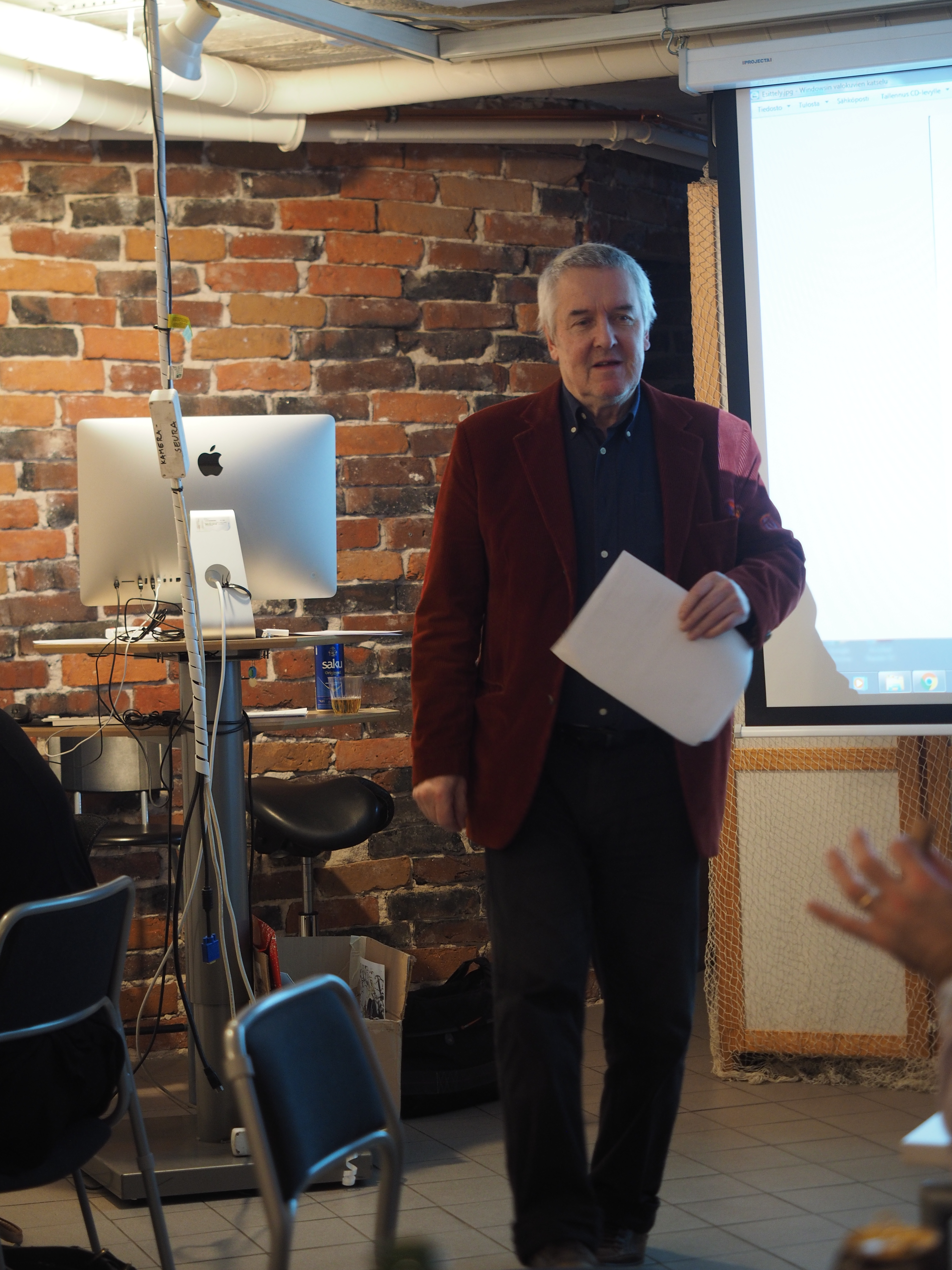
Jussi Aalto at the Christmas party of the Kameraseura photography club in 2019.

Jussi Aalto (born 21 September 1945) is a Finnish photographer and photography teacher from Helsinki, best known for his portrait photographs. He served as the chairman of the Kameraseura photography club from 2002 to 2006. In 1978 and 1985, Aalto was awarded the State Arts Prize for photography. In 2006, he was awarded an artist's pension.

Aalto has held over 50 photography exhibitions, most of them in Helsinki and elsewhere in Finland, but also a few abroad. Aalto has written seven books. From 1969 to 1970, he served as the editorial secretary of the Kamera magazine.

== Exhibitions ==
- Tärähtäneitä valokuvia, Studio of the Museum of Photography 1973
- Muotokuvia, Amos Anderson Art Museum 1986
- Pildistamise rõõm, Uue Kunsti Muuseum, Pärnu, Estonia 2001-2002
- Tärähtäneitä valokuvia, Studio of the Museum of Photography 2005
- Rion pintaa, Photography Centre of Southeastern Finland 2006
- Valokuva on - Jussi Aallon retrospektiivi, Galleria Luova 2008
- Hei, me näppäillään together with Sakari Pälsi, Photography Centre of Southeastern Finland 2016
- Photography exhibition, Museum of Moden Art, Minsk, Belarus 2016

== Bibliography ==
- Suomalaisia, self-published 1977
- Kohteena ihminen, muotokuvauksen opas, Weilin & Göös 1984
- Sakari Pälsi näppäili hyviä kuvia, Otava 1985
- Muotokuvia, self-published 1986
- Helsinki, valoa ja varjoa, Otava 1994
- Kohteena ihminen (second edition), Taide 1999
- Aatamin kuvia ja vähän Eevankin, Finnish union of photography clubs 2002
