= Writing Wild =

2020 book by Kathryn Aalto

Writing Wild: Women Poets, Ramblers, and Mavericks Who Shape How We See the Natural World
- Author: Kathryn Aalto
- Publisher: Timber Press
- Publication date: 2020
- ISBN: 9781604699272

Writing Wild: Women Poets, Ramblers, and Mavericks Who Shape How We See the Natural World is a 2020 book written by Kathryn Aalto and published by Timber Press.

== General themes ==
Aalto came up with the idea after she read an Outside magazine article about 25 nature writers, and realized that 22 of them were white men. She said in an interview, "I wrote a funny but snarky response. I said I could do better, and [was told by Outside] we'd love for you to do it! I wrote an article, looking at 25 women, back to Susan Fenimore Cooper, then I added Dorothy Wordsworth who lived and climbed in the Lake District. The article got a lot of buzz, and I was approached by Timber Press, who published my last book, and they wanted a book."

The book features biographical profiles and excerpts of writing by 25 women writers, including Dorothy Wordsworth, Susan Fenimore Cooper, Gene Stratton-Porter, Mary Austin, Vita Sackville-West, Nan Shepherd, Rachel Carson, Mary Oliver, Carolyn Merchant, Annie Dillard, Gretel Ehrlich, Leslie Marmon Silko, Diane Ackerman, Robin Wall Kimmerer, Lauret Savoy, Rebecca Solnit, Kathleen Jamie, Carolyn Finney, Helen Macdonald, Saci Lloyd, Andrea Wulf, Camille T. Dungy, Elena Passarello, Amy Liptrot, and Elizabeth Rush.

== Reviews ==
Jane Manaster, writing for the San Francisco Book Review, called the book "exciting, inspiring, intimidating, bold, a worthy successor to Aalto's enchanting debut." However, she also noted, "Aalto refrains from mentioning collectively that almost without exception the writers have achieved a PhD, several teaching at colleges and universities, making the collection a singular experience."

Elissa Cooper, writing for the Library Journal, wrote, "Aalto writes in an easy, friendly style that makes readers feel as if they are walking the paths of these women with her. ... While this is a wonderful celebration of female nature writers, the list is still predominantly white and American or European, something the author acknowledges."
