= Marjatta Aalto =

Finnish mycologist (born 1939)

Marjatta Aalto (born 1939) is a Finnish botanist and mycologist known for her work in paleobotany, ethnobotany, and archaeobotany. She worked at the University of Helsinki's Department of Botany, and she is also known for studying Potamogetonaceae. The standard author abbreviation Aalto is used to indicate this person as the author when citing a botanical name.

== Works ==
- Eriksson, B.; Aalto, M.; Kankainen, T. (December 1991). "Hazelnuts from a peat deposit at Evijärvi, western Finland". Bulletin of the Geological Society of Finland. 63 (2): 141–148. doi:10.17741/bgsf/63.2.007.
- Aalto, Marjatta; Heinäjoki-Majander, Hanna (1997). "Archaeobotany and palaeoenvironment of the Viking Age town of Staraja Ladoga, Russia". In Miller, Urve; Clarke, Helen; Hansson, Ann-Marie; Johansson, Birgitta M (eds.). Environment and Vikings: scientific methods and techniques. Produced by the Birka Project for Riksantikvarieämbetet and Statens Historiska Museer. ISBN 9789172090675. OCLC 39456467.
- Aalto, Marjatta (1970). Potamogetonaceae fruits. Societas pro fauna et flora Fennica. OCLC 11419147.
- Aalto, Marjatta (1983). An Eroded interglacial deposit at Vimpeli, South Bothnia, Finland. Geologinen tutkimuslaitos; Govt. Print. Centre, Marketing Dept. [distributor. ISBN 9789516901728. OCLC 11468868.
