= Kameraseura =

Finnish photography organization

Kameraseura (Finnish for "camera society") is an organisation for photography in Finland. It is based in Helsinki and has over one thousand members.

Kameraseura holds various kinds of photography classes and regular themed meetings, and published a monthly photography magazine called Kamera up to June 2024.
