= Jani Aaltonen =

Finnish footballer (born 1990)

Personal information
- Date of birth: 22 January 1990 (age 36)
- Place of birth: Finland
- Height: 1.80 m (5 ft 11 in)
- Position: Centre-back

Senior career*
Years	Team	Apps	(Gls)
2008–2011	TPS Turku	1	(0)
2011–2012	Åbo IFK		
2013	Maskun Palloseura		
- * Club domestic league appearances and goals

Jani Aaltonen (born 22 January 1990) is a Finnish former footballer who played as a centre-back.
