= Kalle Aalto =

Finnish politician

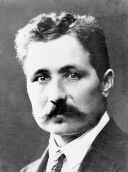
- Kalle Aalto

Member of the Finland Parliament for Turku Province
- In office 1919–1922

Personal details
- Born: 22 February 1884 Halikko, Finland
- Died: 14 December 1950 (aged 66) Halikko, Finland
- Party: Social Democratic Party

Kalle Aalto (22 February 1884 – 14 December 1950) was a Finnish politician. He worked as a mason and builder and later as farmer. Aalto was born and died in Halikko. He became a member of the Parliament of Finland from the constituency of Turku Province South on 16 October 1919, after Sikstus Rönnberg had died. He was a Social Democrat, and served in the parliament till 1922.
