= Marja-Sisko Aalto =

Finnish Lutheran minister

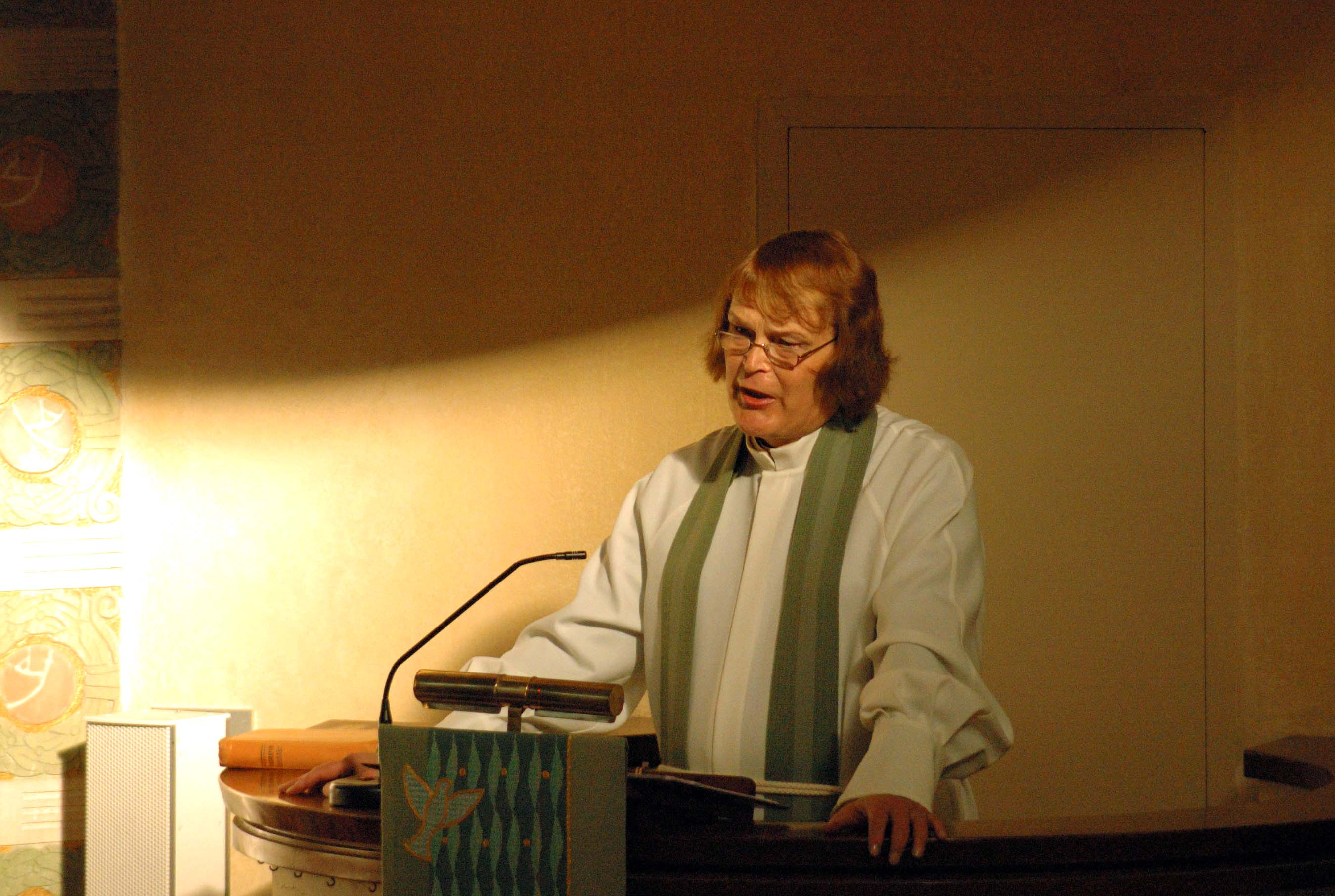
- Born: 29 July 1954 (age 71); Lappeenranta, Finland
- Children: 3
- Website: marja-siskonblogi.blogspot.com

Marja-Sisko Aalto (born 29 July 1954) is a Finnish writer of detective fiction and former minister of the Evangelical Lutheran Church. The vicar of the Imatra parish from 1986 to 2010, Aalto became notable as Finland's first openly transgender minister. In 2009, the Finnish Women's Association named Aalto Lyyti of the Year. Since her resignation as vicar, she has pursued a career as a writer.

== Early life and education ==
Aalto was born on 29 July 1954 in Lappeenranta as the seventh of eight children and was assigned male at birth. She entered the faculty of theology at the University of Helsinki in 1973.

== Clerical career ==
Aalto was the vicar of the Imatra parish from 1986 to 2010.

In November 2008, Aalto came out as a trans woman and announced her intent to have gender-affirming surgery. According to Aalto, her parents had decided to give her the name Marja-Sisko if she had been born a girl, as they had hoped. She was preoccupied with the issue of gender from the age of three. Although her parents had wanted a girl, they did not accept her gender identity. For example, they were angry when Aalto, as a child, asked why she could not wear a skirt when all the other girls did.

Aalto's coming out as a trans woman caused a great controversy in the Church. The bishop of Mikkeli, Voitto Huotari, commented that there is no juridical obstacle for Aalto continuing as a vicar, but predicted that there would be problems. In 2009, almost 600 members left the Imatra parish. In November 2009, Aalto returned to the job of vicar after spending a year on leave. In March 2010, she requested to be allowed to resign, due in part to the discrimination she faced.

She was elected the notary of diocese for Kuopio by the Evangelical Lutheran Church in 2010.

== Writing career ==
Since her resignation as vicar, Aalto has pursued a career as a writer of detective fiction. Aalto's first detective novel, Murder in the Cemetery, was published in Autumn 2013. Her second novel, Deadly Snow was published on National Veterans' Day (Finland) on 27 April 2015. The work is dedicated to the veterans of the Lapland War and continues the story of the protagonist of the previous book.

== Personal life ==
Aalto has been married twice, and has three children.

== Works ==
=== Annette Savolainen series ===
- Murha tuomiokapitulissa [Murder in the Cemetery] (in Finnish). Icasos. 2013. ISBN 978-9526789620.
- Tappavaa lunta [Deadly Snow] (in Finnish). Icasos. 2015. ISBN 978-9526789644.
- Ikoni [Icon] (in Finnish). Icasos. 2016. ISBN 978-9526789675.
- Korppi [Raven] (in Finnish). Icasos. 2018. ISBN 978-9526878027.
- Timantti [Diamond] (in Finnish). Icasos. 2019. ISBN 978-9526878034.

=== Others ===
- Maan nielemät [Swallowed by the Earth] (in Finnish). 2020. ISBN 978-9526878089.
- Veri [Blood] (in Finnish). 2021. ISBN 978-9527412039.
