= Samuli Aaltonen =

Finnish ice hockey player

- Born: August 22, 2000 (age 25) Uusikaupunki, Finland
- Height: 190 cm (6 ft 3 in)
- Weight: 88 kg (194 lb; 13 st 12 lb)
- Position: Forward
- Shoots: Left
- team Former teams: HPK; Porin Ässät; Hermes; FPS Forssa
- Playing career: 2020–present

Samuli Aaltonen is a Finnish professional ice hockey forward who plays for HPK in Liiga.

== Career ==
In the 2020-21 season Aaltonen played 9 games and put up 4 points.

In 2021 Aaltonen signed a 2+1 type of contract with Ässät. Ässät decided to not use the additional year on the contract, and released Aaltonen as a free agent for the 2023–24 season.
