= Susanne Aalto =

Swedish astronomer (born 1964)

Susanne E. Aalto
- Born: 28 November 1964 (age 61); Eskilstuna, Sweden
- Education: Chalmers University of Technology
- Known for: Extragalactic astrophysics
- Scientific career
- Institutions: Chalmers University of Technology

Susanne E. Aalto (born 28 November 1964) is a Swedish professor of radio astronomy geodesy at the Onsala Space Observatory in the department of Space, Earth and Environment at Chalmers University of Technology. She has been a professor of radio astronomy since 2013. Her research focuses on star formation, supermassive black holes and cold jets in galaxies. Aalto was awarded the Albert Wallin Prize by the Royal Society of Arts and Sciences in Gothenburg, Sweden. In 2023 Aalto was elected as a fellow of the Royal Swedish Academy of Engineering Sciences.

== Early life ==
Aalto was born on 28 November 1964 in Eskilstuna, Sweden. In 1994, aged 29, she became Sweden's first female doctor of radio astronomy with a dissertation on radiation from molecules as a way to study galaxies that form many stars simultaneously (starburst galaxies).

Between 1994 and 1999, she completed her post doctoral studies at the Steward Observatory, University of Arizona and at Caltech in the United States. She researches the evolution and motion of galaxies using radio telescopes and radiation from molecular gas clouds.

In 1999, Aalto was awarded the Albert Wallin Prize by the Royal Society of Arts and Sciences in Gothenburg, Sweden.

In 2023 Aalto was elected as a fellow of the Royal Swedish Academy of Engineering Sciences.

In 2024, she became Deputy CEO and Deputy President of the Chalmers University of Technology.
