= Kathryn Aalto =

American landscape designer

- Occupations: landscape designer, historian, educator, author
- Website: https://kathrynaalto.com

Kathryn Aalto is an American landscape designer, historian, educator and author.

== Early life and education ==
Aalto grew up in Escalon, California, where she developed a lifelong interest in landscape history, design and literature of place. She was educated at the University of California at Berkeley, Western Washington University, the London College of Garden Design and the University of Bristol, from which she received a Bachelor's in English, a Master's in English, a Diploma in Garden Design and a Master's in Garden History.

== Career ==
=== Writing ===
Aalto wrote the non-fiction book The Natural World of Winnie-the-Pooh: A Walk Through the Forest that Inspired the Hundred Acre Wood, published in 2015 by Timber Press, which became a New York Times Bestseller in February 2016. It was featured on NPR's "All Things Considered" on October 26, 2015, and selected as a People magazine Best Pick in Nonfiction in November 2015. She is also the author of Nature and Human Intervention about the Italian garden designer Luciano Guibbilei.

In 2020, Aalto authored Writing Wild: Women Poets, Ramblers, and Mavericks Who Shape How We See the Natural World.

=== Teaching and public speaking ===
As an educator, she has taught American Literature of Nature and Place, Critical Thinking and Composition and other writing courses at Western Washington University, Everett Community College and Exeter College where she is an adjunct lecturer. Aalto has lectured at Harvard University's Arnold Arboretum, The New York Public Library, the Northwest Flower and Garden Show and the Virginia Festival of the Book.

== Bibliography ==
- Aalto, Kathryn (2015). The Natural World of Winnie-the-Pooh: A Walk Through the Forest that Inspired the Hundred Acre Wood. Timber Press. ISBN 978-1604695991.
- Aalto, Kathryn; Giubbilei, Luciano (2011). Nature and Human Intervention. Luciano Giubbilei Design. ISBN 9780957035508.
- Aalto, Kathryn (2020), Writing Wild: Women Poets, Ramblers, and Mavericks Who Shape How We See the Natural World. ISBN 9781604699272
