= Ilari Aalto =

Finnish archaeologist (born 1990)

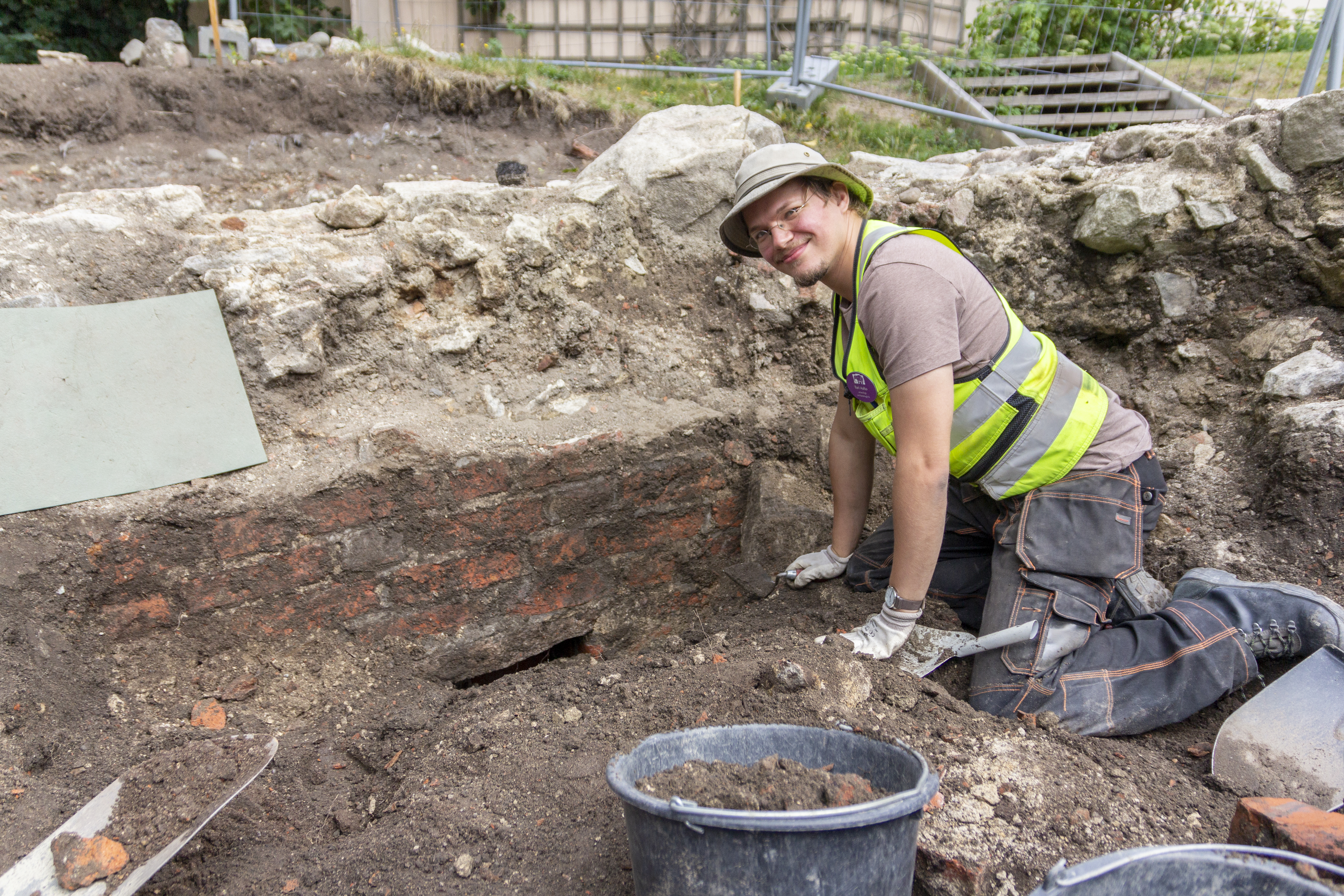
- Aalto in 2018
- Born: 21 March 1990 (age 36)
- Awards: State award for information publication (2016); Science Communications Award (2020)

Academic background
- Education: University of Turku

Academic work
- Discipline: Archaeology
- Sub-discipline: Medieval archaeology; community archaeology
- Institutions: Aboa Vetus & Ars Nova

Ilari Aalto (born 21 March 1990) is a Finnish archaeologist and non-fiction author. He is especially known for his books on archaeology and medieval period in Finland. Working as an archaeologist in Aboa Vetus & Ars Nova Museum, Aalto has led extensive archaeological excavations in Turku, Finland.

== Literary production and awards ==
Aalto has written several Finnish language non-fiction books with his spouse, visual artist Elina Helkala. Their first book Matkaopas keskiajan Suomeen ("Travel Guide to Medieval Finland") was published in 2015 and received positive critical response. The book was awarded with the state award for information publication by the Ministry of Education and Culture in Finland in 2016.

In 2017 the couple published the book Matka muinaiseen Suomeen ("A Travel to Ancient Finland"). The publication was awarded with the Archaeological deed of the year award in 2018 by Suomen muinaistutkimuksen tuki ry (The Finnish Archaeology Support Association).

In 2019 Aalto and Helkala published a children's non-fiction book Jatulintarhoja ja hiidenkiukaita: Nuoren arkeologin käsikirja ("Troy Town Labyrinths and Giant's Stoves: Young Archaeologist's Handbook").

In 2023 the couple continued their publications on medieval Finland with book Vuosi keskiajan Suomessa ("A Year in Medieval Finland"). In the same year, Aalto and Helkala were awarded the Critics Weight prize by the Finnish Critics' Association.

== Science communications ==
In 2020, the Finnish Association of Science Editors and Journalists issued Aalto the Science Communications Award for his archaeology blogging.
