= Minna Aalto =

Finnish windsurfer

Personal information
- Nationality: Finnish
- Born: 8 November 1965 (age 60) Turku, Finland
- Height: 1.59 m (5 ft 3 in)

Sport
- Sport: Windsurfing

Minna Maarit Aalto (born 8 November 1965) is a Finnish windsurfer. She competed in multiple sailing events at the 1996 and 2000 Summer Olympics.
