= Heikki Aalto =

Finnish ice hockey forward

- Born: 12 March 1961 (age 65) Oulu, Finland
- Height: 6 ft 0 in (183 cm)
- Weight: 174 lb (79 kg; 12 st 6 lb)
- Position: Forward
- Shot: Left
- Played for: Kärpät
- Playing career: 1981–1986

Heikki Aalto (born 12 March 1961) is a Finnish former professional ice hockey forward.

Aalto played 37 games over two seasons for Kärpät of the SM-liiga between 1981 and 1983, scoring one goal. He also played in the I-Divisioona for Ketterä and JoKP.

== Career statistics ==
			Regular season					Playoffs
Season	Team	League	GP	G	A	Pts	PIM	GP	G	A	Pts	PIM
1978-79	Kärpät U20	U20 SM-sarja	8	3	1	4	0	—	—	—	—	—
1979-80	Kärpät U20	U20 SM-sarja	24	18	7	25	22	—	—	—	—	—
1980-81	Kärpät U20	U20 SM-sarja	32	35	31	66	39	—	—	—	—	—
1981-82	Kärpät U20	U20 SM-sarja	20	20	12	32	20	—	—	—	—	—
1981-82	Kärpät	SM-liiga	26	1	0	1	4	3	0	0	0	0
1982-83	Kärpät	SM-liiga	11	0	0	0	0	—	—	—	—	—
1984-85	Ketterä	I-Divisioona	33	9	7	16	14	—	—	—	—	—
1985-86	JoKP	I-Divisioona	34	3	8	11	14	—	—	—	—	—
U20 SM-sarja Totals			84	76	51	127	81	—	—	—	—	—
SM-liiga Totals			37	1	0	1	4	3	0	0	0	0
I-Divisioona Totals			67	12	15	27	28	—	—	—	—	—
