= Sakari Manninen =

Finnish ice hockey player

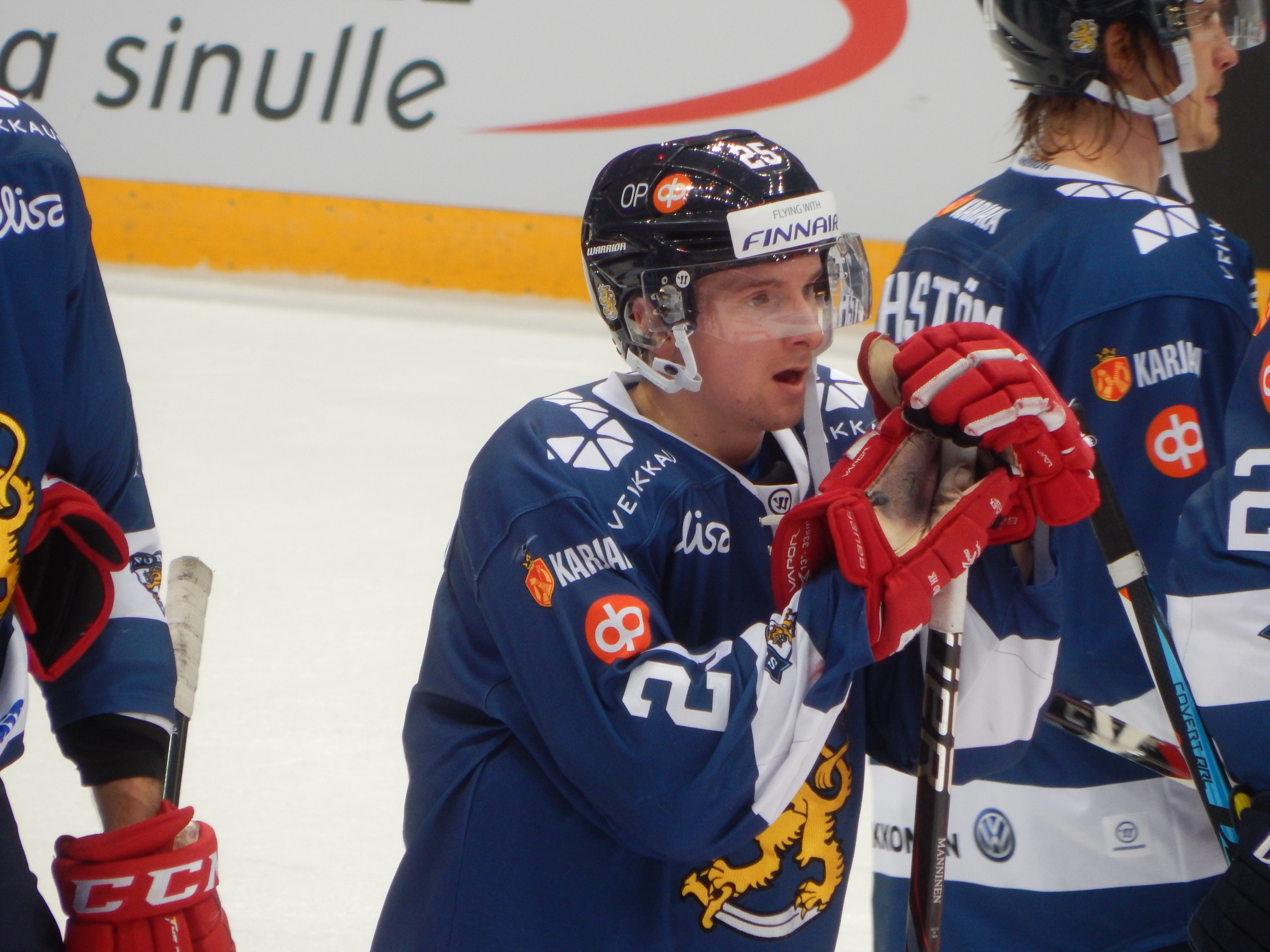
- Manninen with Finland in 2017
- Born: 10 February 1992 (age 34) Oulu, Finland
- Height: 5 ft 7 in (170 cm)
- Weight: 157 lb (71 kg; 11 st 3 lb)
- Position: Forward
- Shoots: Left
- NL team Former teams: Genève-Servette HC; Oulun Kärpät; KalPa; HPK; Örebro HK; Jokerit; Salavat Yulaev Ufa
- National team: Finland
- NHL draft: Undrafted
- Playing career: 2012–present

Sakari Manninen (born 10 February 1992) is a Finnish professional ice hockey player who is a forward for Genève-Servette HC of the National League (NL).

== Playing career ==
Manninen made his Liiga debut playing with Oulun Kärpät during the 2013–14 Liiga season.

After the 2018–19 season, placing second on Jokerit in scoring with 20 goals and 48 points in 62 games, Manninen was traded by Jokerit to fellow KHL club, Salavat Yulaev Ufa, in exchange for financial considerations and the rights to Miro Heiskanen and Henrik Borgström on 17 May 2019.

In March 2022, while in his third season with the club, Manninen left Salavat Yulaev Ufa during playoffs due to the Russian invasion of Ukraine.

On 13 July 2022, Manninen as an undrafted free agent, opted to move to North America and was signed to his first ever NHL contract after agreeing to a one-year, $750,000 contract with the Vegas Golden Knights for the 2022–23 season. After attending the Golden Knights training camp, Manninen was assigned to play in the American Hockey League (AHL) with affiliate, the Henderson Silver Knights. He remained with the Silver Knights for the duration of the season, posting 40 points through 53 regular-season games.

As a pending free agent from the Golden Knights, Manninen opted to resume his European career by agreeing to a one-year contract with Swiss-based Genève-Servette HC of the National League (NL), on 12 May 2023.

== International play ==
Medal record

Representing Finland

Ice hockey

Olympic Games
Gold medal – first place	2022 Beijing	

World Championships
Gold medal – first place	2019 Slovakia	
Gold medal – first place	2022 Finland	
Gold medal – first place	2026 Switzerland	

In 2019 IIHF World Championship Manninen was the point leader of the Finnish national team that claimed the world championship.

== Career statistics ==
=== Regular season and playoffs ===
			Regular season					Playoffs
Season	Team	League	GP	G	A	Pts	PIM	GP	G	A	Pts	PIM
2008–09	Kärpät	FIN U18	26	8	14	22	4	6	3	2	5	4
2009–10	Kärpät	FIN U18	25	5	25	30	12	5	2	1	3	0
2010–11	Kärpät	FIN U20	39	13	29	42	26	—	—	—	—	—
2011–12	Kärpät	FIN U20	46	23	39	62	14	3	1	2	3	2
2012–13	Hokki	Mestis	38	13	16	29	8	4	0	3	3	0
2013–14	Kärpät	FIN U20	9	3	7	10	8	—	—	—	—	—
2013–14	Kärpät	Liiga	7	0	0	0	2	—	—	—	—	—
2013–14	Peliitat	Mestis	10	4	5	9	2	—	—	—	—	—
2013–14	KalPa	Liiga	8	1	0	1	4	—	—	—	—	—
2014–15	Kärpät	Liiga	51	4	15	19	8	19	2	3	5	0
2014–15	Hokki	Mestis	3	2	5	7	0	—	—	—	—	—
2015–16	HPK	Liiga	51	10	21	31	12	—	—	—	—	—
2015–16	Kärpät	Liiga	10	1	4	5	2	13	2	5	7	2
2016–17	HPK	Liiga	57	16	24	40	12	7	2	3	5	0
2017–18	Örebro HK	SHL	48	11	17	28	8	—	—	—	—	—
2018–19	Jokerit	KHL	62	20	28	48	14	6	2	0	2	2
2019–20	Salavat Yulaev Ufa	KHL	56	10	21	31	22	6	4	2	6	6
2020–21	Salavat Yulaev Ufa	KHL	55	19	33	52	10	9	2	3	5	6
2021–22	Salavat Yulaev Ufa	KHL	38	19	13	32	12	1	0	0	0	0
2022–23	Henderson Silver Knights	AHL	53	14	26	40	24	—	—	—	—	—
2023–24	Genève–Servette HC	NL	50	18	23	41	26	2	1	1	2	4
2024–25	Genève–Servette HC	NL	47	16	34	50	40	—	—	—	—	—
2025–26	Genève–Servette HC	NL	46	17	28	45	24	12	0	7	7	6
Liiga totals			184	32	64	96	40	39	6	11	17	2
KHL totals			211	68	95	163	58	22	8	5	13	14

=== International ===
Year	Team	Event	Result	GP	G	A	Pts	PIM
2018	Finland	OG	6th	5	2	1	3	0
2018	Finland	WC	5th	8	0	2	2	10
2019	Finland	WC	1st place, gold medalist(s)	10	2	9	11	6
2022	Finland	OG	1st place, gold medalist(s)	6	4	3	7	0
2022	Finland	WC	1st place, gold medalist(s)	10	6	4	10	2
2023	Finland	WC	7th	8	3	4	7	0
2026	Finland	WC	1st place, gold medalist(s)	10	2	2	4	2
Senior totals				57	19	25	44	20

== Awards and honours ==
Award	Year	Ref
International
Olympic All-Star Team	2022	
World Championship All-Star Team	2022	
