= Matěj Blümel =

Czech ice hockey player (born 2000)

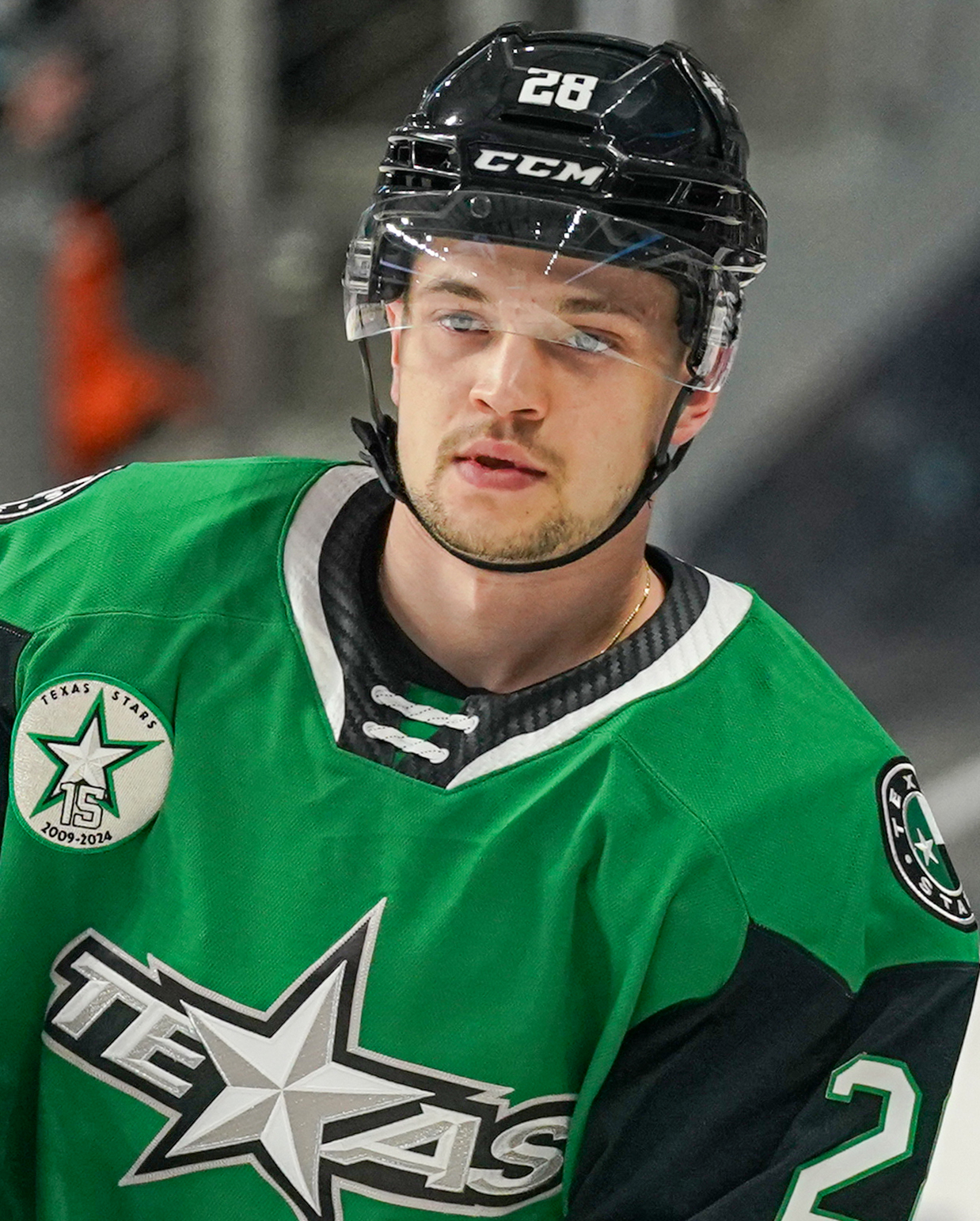
- Blümel with the Texas Stars in 2024
- Born: 31 May 2000 (age 26) Tábor, Czech Republic
- Height: 6 ft 0 in (183 cm)
- Weight: 198 lb (90 kg; 14 st 2 lb)
- Position: Forward
- Shoots: Left
- ELH team Former teams: HC Sparta Praha; Dynamo Pardubice; Dallas Stars; Boston Bruins
- National team: Czech Republic
- NHL draft: 100th overall, 2019; Edmonton Oilers
- Playing career: 2019–present

Matěj Blümel (born 31 May 2000) is a Czech professional ice hockey player who is a forward who is currently playing for HC Sparta Praha of the Czech Extraliga (ELH) and the Czech national team.

== Playing career ==
Blümel, as a youth, began his career within HC Dynamo Pardubice, joining the club as a 13-year-old and featuring through all junior levels. He spent to two junior season in North America, playing with the Waterloo Black Hawks in the United States Hockey League (USHL) before he was drafted by the Edmonton Oilers in the fourth-round, 100th overall, of the 2019 NHL entry draft.

Blümel returned to the Czech Republic and made his professional debut with Dynamo Pardubice during the 2019–20 season. In a depth role, he continued his development in recording 4 goals through 31 regular-season games.

Following his third full season in the ELH, and with his draft rights not retained by the Oilers, Blümel was signed as a free agent to a two-year, entry-level contract with the Dallas Stars on 7 June 2022.

Blümel scored his first career NHL goal against the Philadelphia Flyers on 13 November 2022.

During the 2024–25 season in the AHL with the Texas Stars, Blümel scored a league-leading 39 goals in 67 games, and with 72 points finished only one behind the league leader in that category as well. He received the Willie Marshall Award as the top goal scorer, and was selected as a First Team All-Star.

Unable to secure a role in the NHL with the Stars, Blümel left as a free agent to a sign a one-year, $875,000 contract with the Boston Bruins for the 2025–26 season on 1 July 2025. In making his choice, Blümel said he was choosing between the Bruins and the Pittsburgh Penguins, and it was Bruins star and fellow Czech David Pastrňák who reached out and convinced Blümel to choose Boston. In the 2025–26 season, Blümel played predominately with AHL affiliate, the Providence Bruins, posting 52 points through 58 regular season games. He briefly played in the NHL with the Bruins, going scoreless through 4 appearances.

As a free agent from the Bruins, Blümel opted to halt his career in North America, returning to his native Czech Republic and securing a long-term, four-year contract with HC Sparta Praha of the ELH, on 14 July 2026.

== International play ==
Medal record

Men's ice hockey

Representing the Czech Republic

World Championships
Bronze medal – third place	2022 Finland	

Blümel represented the Czech Republic at the 2021 IIHF World Championship, collecting 1 goal in 5 games to help Czechia finish in 7th place.

He returned with the Czech Republic in the following 2022 IIHF World Championship hosted in Finland, and produced four goals and 8 points through 10 games to help Czechia claim their first medal in 10 years in capturing the bronze.

== Career statistics ==
=== Regular season and playoffs ===
Bold indicates led league

			Regular season					Playoffs
Season	Team	League	GP	G	A	Pts	PIM	GP	G	A	Pts	PIM
2016–17	HC Dynamo Pardubice	Czech.20	3	1	2	3	2	—	—	—	—	—
2017–18	Waterloo Black Hawks	USHL	50	8	10	18	10	2	0	0	0	0
2018–19	Waterloo Black Hawks	USHL	58	30	30	60	22	4	3	1	4	2
2019–20	HC Dynamo Pardubice	ELH	31	4	1	5	18	—	—	—	—	—
2020–21	HC Dynamo Pardubice	ELH	49	17	15	32	6	8	2	2	4	0
2021–22	HC Dynamo Pardubice	ELH	49	12	12	24	8	5	0	0	0	0
2022–23	Texas Stars	AHL	58	19	25	44	6	6	0	1	1	0
2022–23	Dallas Stars	NHL	6	1	0	1	0	—	—	—	—	—
2023–24	Texas Stars	AHL	72	31	31	62	37	7	5	4	9	4
2024–25	Dallas Stars	NHL	7	1	0	1	0	—	—	—	—	—
2024–25	Texas Stars	AHL	67	**39**	33	72	26	14	7	9	16	4
2025–26	Providence Bruins	AHL	58	21	31	52	20	4	2	0	2	0
2025–26	Boston Bruins	NHL	4	0	0	0	0	—	—	—	—	—
ELH totals			129	33	28	61	32	13	2	2	4	0
NHL totals			17	2	0	2	0	—	—	—	—	—

=== International ===
Year	Team	Event	Result	GP	G	A	Pts	PIM
2016	Czech Republic	U17	8th	5	0	1	1	2
2017	Czech Republic	IH18	2nd place, silver medalist(s)	5	0	2	2	0
2018	Czech Republic	U18	4th	7	2	2	4	6
2020	Czech Republic	WJC	7th	5	1	0	1	0
2021	Czech Republic	WC	7th	5	1	0	1	0
2022	Czechia	WC	3rd place, bronze medalist(s)	10	4	4	8	0
2026	Czechia	WC	5th	7	2	2	4	0
Junior totals				22	3	5	8	8
Senior totals				22	7	6	13	0

== Awards and honors ==
Award	Year
International
World U18 Championship Top 3 Player on Team	2018
AHL
All-Star Classic	2024
Willie Marshall Award	2025
First All-Star Team	2025
