= Petr Holík =

Czech ice hockey player

Petr Holik
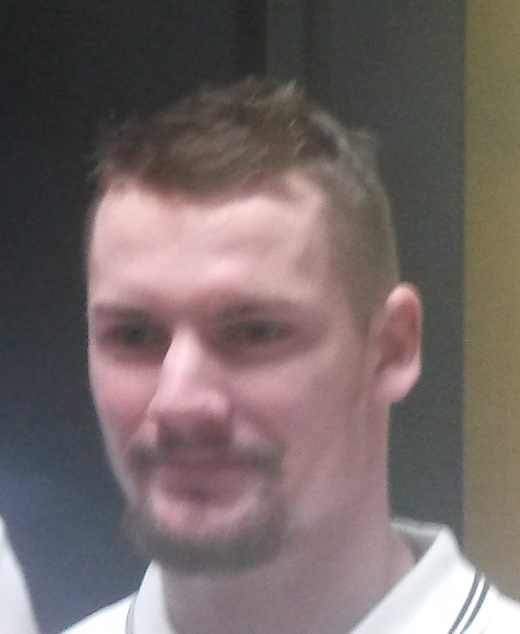
- Born: March 3, 1992 (age 34) Zlín, Czechoslovakia
- Height: 5 ft 9 in (175 cm)
- Weight: 163 lb (74 kg; 11 st 9 lb)
- Position: Centre
- Shoots: Left
- ELH team Former teams: HC Kometa Brno; HC Zlín; Severstal Cherepovets; BK Mladá Boleslav
- Playing career: 2010–present

Petr Holík (born March 3, 1992) is a Czech professional ice hockey player who currently plays for PSG Zlín in the Czech Extraliga (ELH). He formerly played in HC Kometa Brno and BK Mladá Boleslav.

After spending his first seven seasons of his career with Zlín, Holík accepted a new challenge in agreeing to a two-year contract with Russian club, Severstal Cherepovets of the Kontinental Hockey League (KHL) on April 27, 2017.

He was invited to the Czech Republic National Junior Team camp, for the IIHF World Junior Championship in 2011.
