= Jakub Flek =

Czech ice hockey player (born 1992)

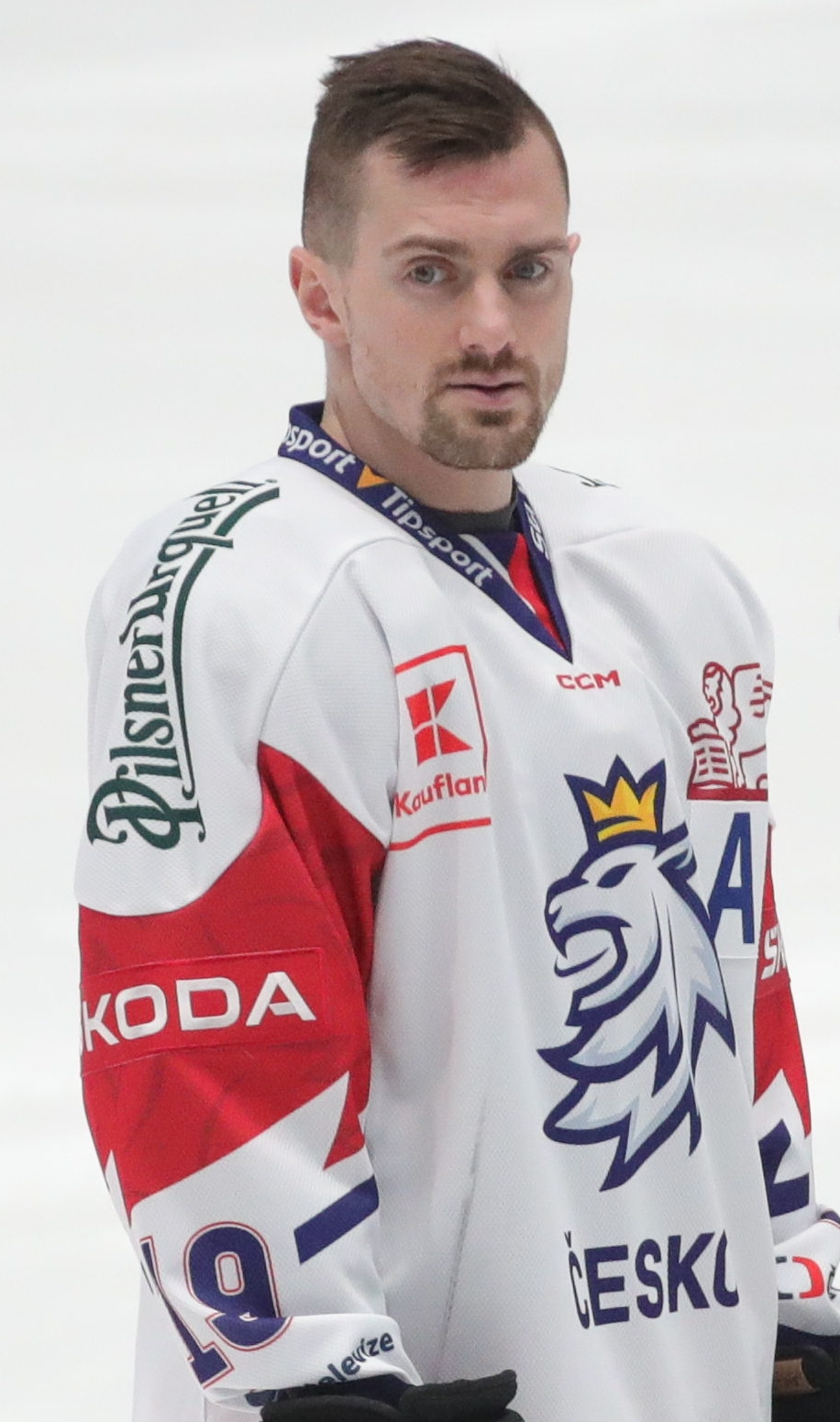
- Flek with the Czech Republic in 2023
- Born: 24 December 1992 (age 33) Mariánské Lázně, Czechoslovakia
- Height: 5 ft 8 in (173 cm)
- Weight: 168 lb (76 kg; 12 st 0 lb)
- Position: Left wing
- Shoots: Left
- ELH team Former teams: HC Kometa Brno; HC Karlovy Vary
- National team: Czech Republic
- Playing career: 2014–present

Jakub Flek (born 24 December 1992) is a Czech professional ice hockey player who is a left winger for HC Kometa Brno of the Czech Extraliga (ELH).

== Playing career ==
Flek first played for HC Karlovy Vary during the 2013–14 Czech Extraliga season and has played 184 games for the team up to the 2019–20 season. He has also played on loan with HC Baník Sokolov and HC Dukla Jihlava.

Following nine seasons in the ELH with Karlovy Vary, Flek left the club and continued his career in the Czech Republic by agreeing to a multi-year contract with HC Kometa Brno on 31 May 2024.

== International play ==
Medal record

Representing Czech Republic

Ice hockey

World Championships
| Gold medal – first place | 2024 Czechia | |
| Bronze medal – third place | 2022 Finland | |

Flek represented Czechia at the 2024 IIHF World Championship and won a gold medal.

== Career statistics ==
=== Regular season and playoffs ===
| | | | Regular season | | | | | Playoffs |
| Season | Team | League | GP | G | A | Pts | PIM | GP | G | A | Pts | PIM |
|---|---|---|---|---|---|---|---|---|---|---|---|---|
| 2011–12 | SHC Klatovy | CZE U20 | 25 | 26 | 22 | 48 | 38 | — | — | — | — | — |
| 2011–12 | SHC Klatovy | Czech.2 | 17 | 5 | 2 | 7 | 6 | 6 | 0 | 0 | 0 | 0 |
| 2012–13 | HC Karlovy Vary | MHL | 63 | 18 | 15 | 33 | 16 | 5 | 1 | 0 | 1 | 4 |
| 2013–14 | HC Karlovy Vary | MHL | 38 | 14 | 14 | 28 | 42 | 9 | 2 | 1 | 3 | 0 |
| 2013–14 | HC Karlovy Vary | ELH | 6 | 1 | 0 | 1 | 10 | — | — | — | — | — |
| 2014–15 | HC Karlovy Vary | ELH | 16 | 1 | 1 | 2 | 0 | — | — | — | — | — |
| 2014–15 | HC Baník Sokolov | Czech.2 | 23 | 27 | 14 | 41 | 22 | 8 | 5 | 8 | 13 | 6 |
| 2015–16 | HC Karlovy Vary | ELH | 10 | 0 | 0 | 0 | 0 | — | — | — | — | — |
| 2015–16 | HC Dukla Jihlava | Czech.1 | 26 | 7 | 6 | 13 | 4 | — | — | — | — | — |
| 2016–17 | HC Karlovy Vary | ELH | 46 | 7 | 7 | 14 | 6 | — | — | — | — | — |
| 2017–18 | HC Karlovy Vary | Czech.1 | 50 | 22 | 20 | 42 | 12 | 8 | 8 | 3 | 11 | 12 |
| 2018–19 | HC Karlovy Vary | ELH | 44 | 17 | 12 | 29 | 6 | — | — | — | — | — |
| 2019–20 | HC Karlovy Vary | ELH | 51 | 14 | 24 | 38 | 4 | 2 | 1 | 1 | 2 | 0 |
| 2020–21 | HC Karlovy Vary | ELH | 48 | 18 | 17 | 35 | 6 | 4 | 3 | 1 | 4 | 0 |
| 2021–22 | HC Karlovy Vary | ELH | 46 | 15 | 20 | 35 | 4 | 3 | 0 | 1 | 1 | 0 |
| 2022–23 | HC Kometa Brno | ELH | 52 | 19 | 9 | 28 | 8 | 10 | 4 | 2 | 6 | 2 |
| 2023–24 | HC Kometa Brno | ELH | 51 | 19 | 26 | 45 | 6 | 6 | 2 | 2 | 4 | 6 |
| 2024–25 | HC Kometa Brno | ELH | 45 | 24 | 23 | 47 | 9 | 20 | 8 | 3 | 11 | 4 |
| 2025–26 | HC Kometa Brno | ELH | 50 | 24 | 20 | 44 | 4 | 8 | 2 | 3 | 5 | 2 |
| ELH totals | | | 465 | 159 | 159 | 318 | 63 | 53 | 20 | 13 | 33 | 14 |

=== International ===
| Year | Team | Event | Result | GP | G | A | Pts | PIM |
|---|---|---|---|---|---|---|---|---|
| 2021 | Czech Republic | WC | 7th | 8 | 2 | 0 | 2 | 0 |
| 2022 | Czechia | WC | 3rd place, bronze medalist(s) | 10 | 1 | 2 | 3 | 2 |
| 2023 | Czechia | WC | 8th | 8 | 2 | 2 | 4 | 0 |
| 2024 | Czechia | WC | 1st place, gold medalist(s) | 7 | 2 | 0 | 2 | 0 |
| 2025 | Czechia | WC | 6th | 8 | 5 | 2 | 7 | 0 |
| 2026 | Czechia | OG | 8th | 5 | 0 | 0 | 0 | 0 |
| 2026 | Czechia | WC | 5th | 8 | 2 | 2 | 4 | 0 |
| Senior totals | | | | 54 | 14 | 8 | 22 | 2 |
