= Joel Kellman =

Swedish ice hockey player

- Born: 25 May 1994 (age 32) Karlskrona, Sweden
- Height: 180 cm (5 ft 11 in)
- Weight: 87 kg (192 lb; 13 st 10 lb)
- Position: Centre
- Shoots: Left
- SHL team Former teams: Färjestad BK; HV71; Karlskrona HK; Brynäs IF; San Jose Sharks; Växjö Lakers
- National team: Sweden
- NHL draft: Undrafted
- Playing career: 2013–present

Joel Kellman (born 25 May 1994) is a Swedish professional ice hockey center for the Färjestad BK of the Swedish Hockey League (SHL).

== Playing career ==
Undrafted, Kellman played as a junior within the Malmö Redhawks before making his Swedish Hockey League debut playing 1 game with HV71 during the 2013–14 SHL season.

Kellman transferred to Karlskrona HK of the HockeyAllsvenskan, after an initial loan, for the 2014–15 season. In helping Karlskrona gain promotion to the SHL, Kellman became a fixture amongst the scoring lines in the following three seasons. Improving his points totals in each season, Kellman produced 15 goals and 34 points in 51 games during the 2017–18 season, however was unable to prevent Karlskrona returning to the Allsvenskan.

In order to remain in the SHL, Kellman signed a two-year contract with Brynäs IF on 9 April 2018. In the 2018–19 season with Brynäs IF, he tallied 16 goals and 18 assists in 45 games. He led the team in goals and was third in assists and points.

In showing continued improvement throughout his SHL career, Kellman opted out of his contract with Brynäs in securing a one-year, entry-level contract with the San Jose Sharks of the NHL on 26 April 2019. He made his NHL debut on 21 December 2019. He scored his first NHL goal on 28 December 2019, in a 6–1 win over the Philadelphia Flyers.

On 28 August 2020, Kellman as a restricted free agent was signed to a two-year $1.5 million contract extension with the San Jose Sharks. On 18 September 2020, Kellman was loaned to Swedish Allsvenskan club, Kristianstads IK, until the commencement of the delayed 2020–21 NHL season. He featured in 14 games with Kristianstads, collecting 3 goals and 5 points. In December 2021, his contract with the Sharks was terminated and he signed with the Växjö Lakers.

== Career statistics ==
=== Regular season and playoffs ===
			Regular season					Playoffs
Season	Team	League	GP	G	A	Pts	PIM	GP	G	A	Pts	PIM
2010–11	Malmö Redhawks	J20	10	4	1	5	2	—	—	—	—	—
2011–12	Malmö Redhawks	J20	47	20	15	35	18	5	0	0	0	0
2012–13	Malmö Redhawks	J20	43	19	30	49	20	3	1	0	1	6
2012–13	Malmö Redhawks	Allsv	12	0	1	1	4	—	—	—	—	—
2012–13	Borås HC	Div.1	1	1	0	1	0	—	—	—	—	—
2013–14	HV71	J20	31	10	10	20	14	6	0	5	5	2
2013–14	HV71	SHL	1	0	0	0	0	—	—	—	—	—
2013–14	Karlskrona HK	Allsv	18	4	4	8	6	6	1	1	2	0
2014–15	Karlskrona HK	Allsv	49	17	22	39	26	4	4	0	4	2
2015–16	Karlskrona HK	SHL	47	3	13	16	22	—	—	—	—	—
2016–17	Karlskrona HK	SHL	52	15	15	30	20	—	—	—	—	—
2017–18	Karlskrona HK	SHL	51	15	19	34	30	—	—	—	—	—
2018–19	Brynäs IF	SHL	45	16	18	34	16	—	—	—	—	—
2019–20	San Jose Barracuda	AHL	25	4	12	16	6	—	—	—	—	—
2019–20	San Jose Sharks	NHL	31	3	4	7	4	—	—	—	—	—
2020–21	Kristianstads IK	Allsv	14	3	2	5	8	—	—	—	—	—
2020–21	San Jose Sharks	NHL	7	1	1	2	6	—	—	—	—	—
2020–21	San Jose Barracuda	AHL	19	8	13	21	4	—	—	—	—	—
2021–22	San Jose Barracuda	AHL	10	1	3	4	8	—	—	—	—	—
2021–22	Växjö Lakers	SHL	25	6	9	15	29	4	1	5	6	6
2022–23	Växjö Lakers	SHL	43	7	11	18	12	18	3	4	7	6
2023–24	Färjestad BK	SHL	50	12	15	27	26	4	1	0	1	4
2024–25	Färjestad BK	SHL	51	10	23	33	36	6	2	3	5	4
SHL totals			365	84	123	207	191	32	7	12	19	20
NHL totals			38	4	5	9	10	—	—	—	—	—

=== International ===
Year	Team	Event	Result	GP	G	A	Pts	PIM
2022	Sweden	WC	6th	8	2	4	6	4
Senior totals				8	2	4	6	4

== Awards and honors ==
Awards	Year
SHL
Le Mat Trophy	2023
