= Miro Aaltonen =

Finnish ice hockey player (born 1993)

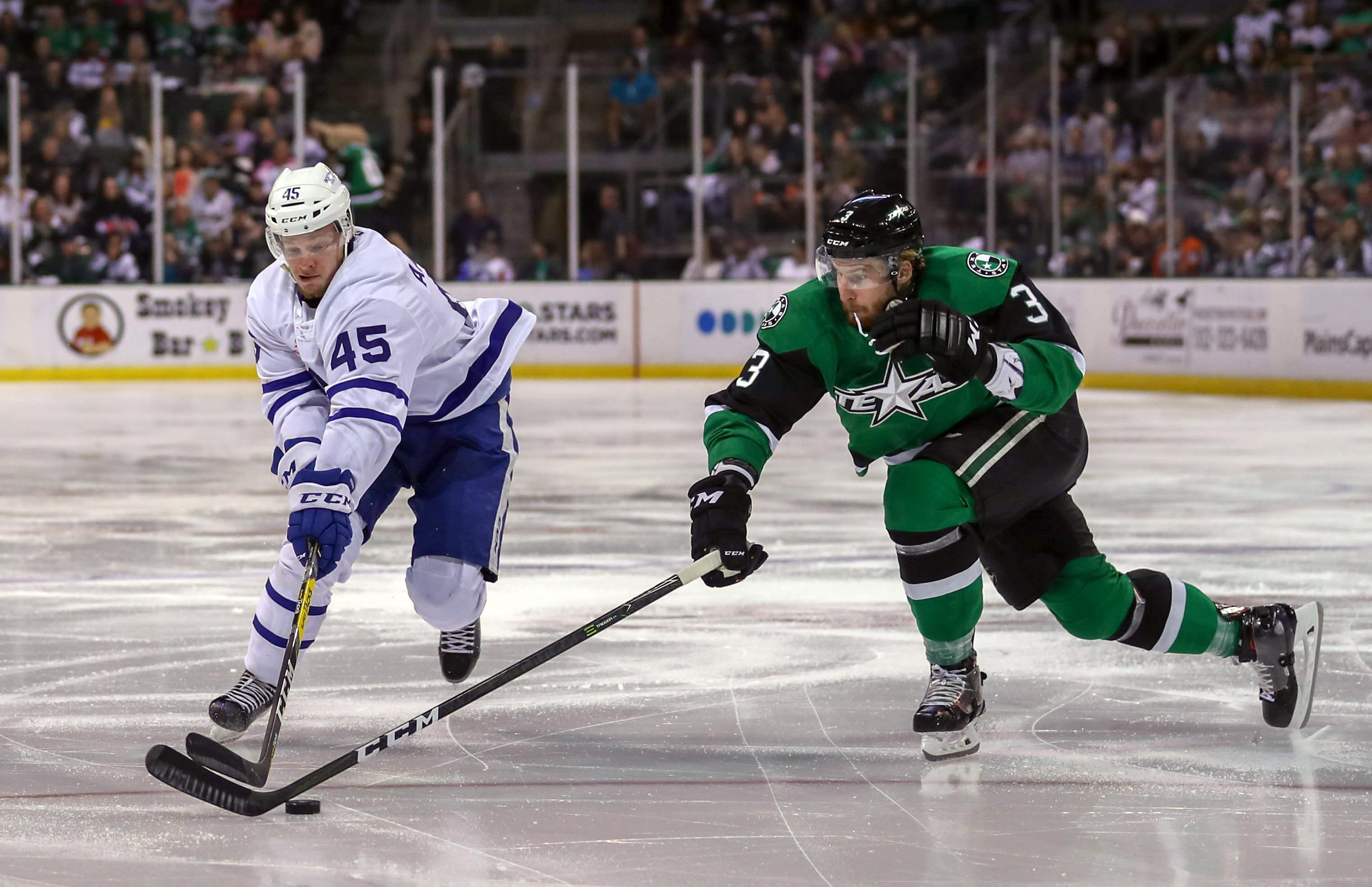
- Aaltonen with the Toronto Marlies
- Born: 7 June 1993 (age 33) Joensuu, Finland
- Height: 6 ft 0 in (183 cm)
- Weight: 176 lb (80 kg; 12 st 8 lb)
- Position: Centre
- Shoots: Left
- NL team Former teams: SC Bern; Espoo Blues; Kärpät; Vityaz Podolsk; SKA Saint Petersburg; EHC Kloten
- National team: Finland
- NHL draft: 177th overall, 2013; Anaheim Ducks
- Playing career: 2011–present

Miro Aaltonen (born 7 June 1993) is a Finnish professional ice hockey forward for SC Bern of the National League (NL). Aaltonen was selected by Atlant Moscow Oblast in the 2nd round (45th overall) of the 2011 KHL Junior Draft, and he was also selected by the Anaheim Ducks in the 6th round (177th overall) of the 2013 NHL entry draft.

== Playing career ==
Following the 2016–17 season, after recording a career-best 44 points in 59 games after his first season with HC Vityaz in the Kontinental Hockey League, he signed an entry-level contract with the Toronto Maple Leafs on 17 March 2017.

Despite a strong push for a roster spot as the Leafs' fourth-line center, he was assigned to the Maple Leafs American Hockey League affiliate, the Toronto Marlies for the 2017–18 season. In adapting to his first North American season, Aaltonen established himself among the offensive leaders with the Marlies, contributing 20 goals and 43 points in 64 regular season games. Unable to earn a call-up to the NHL, Aaltonen continued in the post-season with the Marlies, helping claim the club's first Calder Cup in posting 13 points in 20 games.

As an impending restricted free agent from the Maple Leafs but unable to make his NHL debut, Aaltonen opted to return to the KHL on a contract with former Russian club, Vityaz on 1 July 2018.

Following his first full season with SKA Saint Petersburg in 2020–21, Aaltonen was returned in trade, alongside Viktor Antipin, to former club HC Vityaz in exchange for four prospects on 15 June 2021.

On 1 May 2022, Aaltonen left Vityaz as a free agent and was announced to have signed a two-year contract to remain in the KHL with Avtomobilist Yekaterinburg. Having signed before the Russian invasion of Ukraine, Aaltonen sought a release from his contract with Avtomobilist and on 21 June 2022, was signed to a two-year contract with Swiss club, EHC Kloten of the NL.

On 3 December 2024, while still playing for Kloten, Aaltonen signed a two-year contract with SC Bern, to run from 2025 to 2027.

On 17 January 2025, Aaltonen was suspended indefinitely from playing in Switzerland's National League pending an investigation for a doping violation, which Aaltonen later admitted to be from recreational drug use. The next day, EHC Kloten announced that the club and Aaltonen had agreed to terminate the remainder of his contract, which was set to expire at the end of the season.

== Career statistics ==
=== Regular season and playoffs ===
			Regular season					Playoffs
Season	Team	League	GP	G	A	Pts	PIM	GP	G	A	Pts	PIM
2009–10	Blues	FIN U18 Q	1	2	1	3	0	—	—	—	—	—
2009–10	Blues	FIN U18	7	2	11	3	8	10	6	7	13	6
2009–10	Blues	FIN U20	40	12	15	27	18	—	—	—	—	—
2010–11	Blues	FIN U18	2	0	3	3	2	2	3	1	4	2
2010–11	Blues	FIN U20	12	3	5	8	6	13	5	6	11	2
2011–12	Blues	FIN U20	14	10	17	27	14	4	2	3	5	2
2011–12	Blues	SM-l	26	1	1	2	2	10	1	1	2	2
2011–12	Jokipojat	Mestis	4	2	3	5	0	—	—	—	—	—
2012–13	Blues	SM-l	32	11	5	16	22	—	—	—	—	—
2012–13	Blues	FIN U20	—	—	—	—	—	8	4	9	13	4
2013–14	Blues	Liiga	60	13	16	29	12	7	3	4	7	0
2014–15	Blues	Liiga	57	16	21	37	14	4	1	1	2	0
2015–16	Kärpät	Liiga	58	15	20	35	51	8	0	3	3	0
2016–17	HC Vityaz	KHL	59	19	25	44	38	4	0	0	0	7
2017–18	Toronto Marlies	AHL	64	20	23	43	24	20	4	9	13	6
2018–19	HC Vityaz	KHL	61	19	23	42	20	4	0	0	0	4
2019–20	HC Vityaz	KHL	34	9	15	24	8	—	—	—	—	—
2019–20	SKA Saint Petersburg	KHL	11	2	2	4	2	4	0	0	0	0
2020–21	SKA Saint Petersburg	KHL	35	10	9	19	10	—	—	—	—	—
2021–22	HC Vityaz	KHL	44	10	32	42	10	—	—	—	—	—
2022–23	EHC Kloten	NL	51	19	30	49	20	3	0	2	2	2
2023–24	EHC Kloten	NL	46	9	14	23	18	—	—	—	—	—
2024–25	EHC Kloten	NL	36	20	15	35	18	—	—	—	—	—
2024–25	SC Bern	NL	4	2	1	3	0	7	5	1	6	2
2025–26	SC Bern	NL	43	5	17	22	16	2	0	0	0	0
Liiga totals			233	56	63	119	101	29	5	9	14	2
KHL totals			244	69	106	175	88	12	0	0	0	11
NL totals			180	55	177	132	72	12	5	3	8	4

Medal record

Representing Finland

Ice hockey

Olympic Games
Gold medal – first place	2022 Beijing	

=== International ===
Year	Team	Event	Result	GP	G	A	Pts	PIM
2010	Finland	U17	10th	5	0	3	3	2
2011	Finland	WJC18	5th	6	4	0	4	2
2012	Finland	WJC	4th	7	1	3	4	0
2013	Finland	WJC	7th	1	2	1	3	0
2017	Finland	WC	4th	8	0	0	0	2
2022	Finland	OG	1st place, gold medalist(s)	6	3	1	4	2
Junior totals				19	7	7	14	4
Senior totals				8	0	0	0	2
Senior totals				6	3	1	4	2

== Awards and honors ==
Awards	Year
AHL
Calder Cup (Toronto Marlies)	2018
