= Henrik Tömmernes =

Swedish ice hockey player (born 1990)

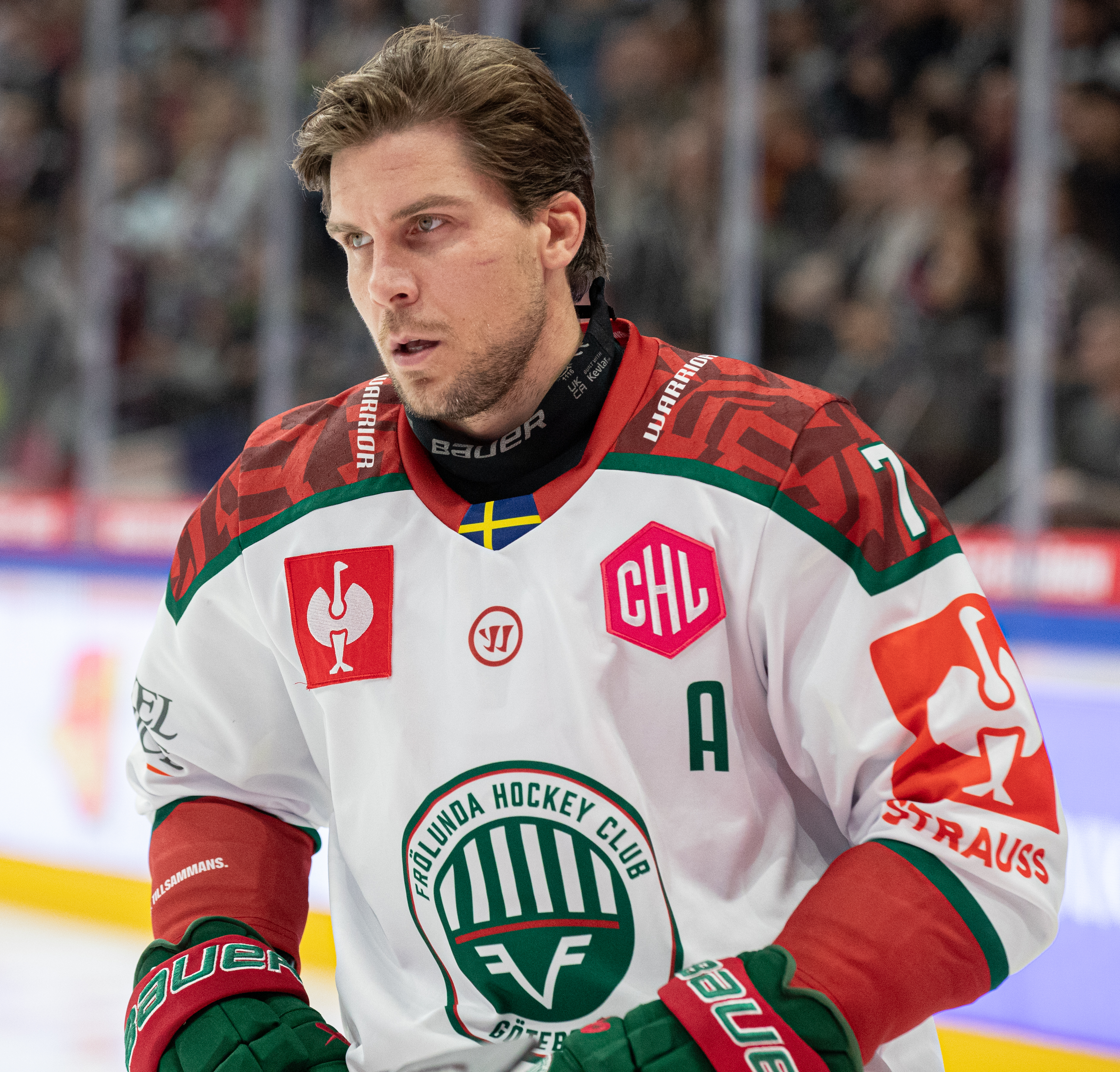
- Tömmernes playing for Frölunda HC in 2025
- Born: 28 August 1990 (age 36) Karlstad, Sweden
- Height: 185 cm (6 ft 1 in)
- Weight: 80 kg (176 lb; 12 st 8 lb)
- Position: Defence
- Shoots: Left
- SHL team Former teams: Frölunda HC; Utica Comets; Tappara; Genève-Servette HC
- National team: Sweden
- NHL draft: 210th overall, 2011; Vancouver Canucks
- Playing career: 2008–present

Joakim Henrik Tömmernes (born 28 August 1990) is a Swedish professional ice hockey defenceman who currently plays for Frölunda HC of the Swedish Hockey League (SHL). He was drafted by the Vancouver Canucks in the seventh round, 210th overall, of the 2011 National Hockey League entry draft. Tömmernes played four seasons with Frölunda HC in the Elitserien before moving to North America to join the Canucks minor league affiliate in Utica.

Known for his leadership skills, he has served as captain or alternate captain for several teams during his playing career, including captaining his country in 2021.

== Playing career ==
Tömmernes played junior hockey Färjestad BK in the J18 Elit. In the 2006–07 season, his first with the team, Tömmernes, helped them win the J18 Allsvenskan championship. The following season he helped Färjestad back to the championship, where they finished second. Tömmernes led all South Division defencemen in assists and points. Before the 2008–09 season, Tömmernes moved to Frölunda HC in the J20 SuperElit once he became too old for the U18 team. He continued to contribute points from the blue line leading all South Division defenders in goals, assists, and points. He also made his Elitserien debut playing in 11 games with Frölunda's top team. In the off-season Tömmernes signed a two-year contract with Frölunda.

In the first year of his contract Tömmernes played four games in the J20 SuperElit recording a goal and an assist. For the majority of the season he played in the SHL and also played 23 games for Borås HC in the HockeyAllsvenskan while on loan from Frölunda. During the 2010–11 season Tömmernes suffered a knee injury in the opening game. He returned to play in 47 games registering a career high 20 points. Following the end of the season the National Hockey League's (NHL) Vancouver Canucks drafted Tömmernes in the seventh round, 210th overall, in the 2011 NHL entry draft. Despite being drafted Tömmernes agreed to return with Frölunda on a one-year contract. Tömmernes was injured again in the 2011–12 season, suffering a broken jaw. In 44 games he increased his goal production from three to five, but his overall point production fell to 14. He again signed a one-year contract extension with Frölunda at the season's end.

Following the completion of the 2012–13 season, Tömmernes and Vancouver agreed to terms on a three-year entry-level contract. He joined the Canucks for training camp and played in the preseason registering two assists. He failed to make the team and was assigned to Vancouver's American Hockey League (AHL) affiliate, the Utica Comets.

In the 2014–15 season, continuing with the Utica Comets but unable to earn a call-up to the Canucks, on 8 January 2015, Tömmernes was placed on unconditional waivers in order for a mutual termination of his NHL contract. On 11 January 2015, Tömmernes returned to Europe in signing for the remainder of the season with Finnish club, Tappara.

On 31 May 2017, Tömmernes agreed to a two-year contract with Genève-Servette HC of the National League (NL). He made his NL debut on 7 September 2017, at home against Lausanne HC. On 4 January 2019, Tömmernes was signed to a two-year contract extension by Geneva through the 2020/21 season, with an option for the 2021/22 season. On 25 May 2020, Tömmernes was signed to an early two-year contract extension by Servette through the end of the 2022/23 season. On April 27, 2023, Tömmernes won the NL title with Servette to end his 6-year tenure with the team.

== Career statistics ==
=== Regular season and playoffs ===
			Regular season					Playoffs
Season	Team	League	GP	G	A	Pts	PIM	GP	G	A	Pts	PIM
2006–07	Färjestad BK	J18 Allsv	14	3	6	9	32	8	3	4	7	4
2007–08	Färjestad BK	J18	8	2	5	7	4	—	—	—	—	—
2007–08	Färjestad BK	J18 Allsv	14	2	11	13	6	8	0	3	3	0
2008–09	Frölunda HC	J20	40	10	22	32	52	5	2	6	8	8
2008–09	Frölunda HC	SEL	11	0	0	0	0	—	—	—	—	—
2009–10	Frölunda HC	J20	4	1	1	2	4	—	—	—	—	—
2009–10	Borås HC	Allsv	23	5	9	14	43	—	—	—	—	—
2009–10	Frölunda HC	SEL	27	0	3	3	10	7	0	1	1	2
2010–11	Frölunda HC	SEL	47	3	17	20	24	—	—	—	—	—
2011–12	Frölunda HC	SEL	44	5	9	14	36	6	1	3	4	4
2012–13	Frölunda HC	SEL	54	5	11	16	28	6	1	4	5	5
2013–14	Utica Comets	AHL	54	4	14	18	14	—	—	—	—	—
2014–15	Utica Comets	AHL	23	3	8	11	8	—	—	—	—	—
2014–15	Tappara	Liiga	22	2	8	10	18	20	2	5	7	8
2015–16	Frölunda HC	SHL	50	10	19	29	14	16	2	6	8	2
2016–17	Frölunda HC	SHL	49	8	31	39	16	14	1	7	8	2
2017–18	Genève–Servette HC	NL	44	6	22	28	40	5	0	2	2	0
2018–19	Genève–Servette HC	NL	40	9	18	27	18	4	1	0	1	2
2019–20	Genève–Servette HC	NL	38	9	18	27	16	—	—	—	—	—
2020–21	Genève–Servette HC	NL	44	13	24	37	74	11	4	8	12	6
2021–22	Genève–Servette HC	NL	51	10	48	58	40	2	0	1	1	2
2022–23	Genève–Servette HC	NL	52	18	25	43	32	17	3	10	13	6
2023–24	Frölunda HC	SHL	49	8	22	30	26	14	0	7	7	4
2024–25	Frölunda HC	SHL	49	6	33	39	22	12	1	4	5	6
2025–26	Frölunda HC	SHL	52	6	29	35	20	4	0	2	2	8
SHL totals			432	51	174	225	196	79	6	34	40	34
NL totals			269	65	155	220	220	39	8	21	29	16

=== International ===
Year	Team	Event	Result	GP	G	A	Pts	PIM
2021	Sweden	WC	9th	7	2	3	5	4
2022	Sweden	OG	4th	6	0	5	5	2
2022	Sweden	WC	6th	8	0	2	2	4
2023	Sweden	WC	6th	8	0	10	10	2
Senior totals				29	2	20	22	12

== Awards and honours ==
Award	Year
CHL
Champions (Frölunda HC)	2016, 2017, 2026
SHL
Le Mat Trophy (Frölunda HC)	2016
Salming Trophy	2017
NL
Champions (Genève-Servette HC)	2023
Best defender	2021,2022,2023
MVP	2022
