= Juho Olkinuora =

Finnish ice hockey player

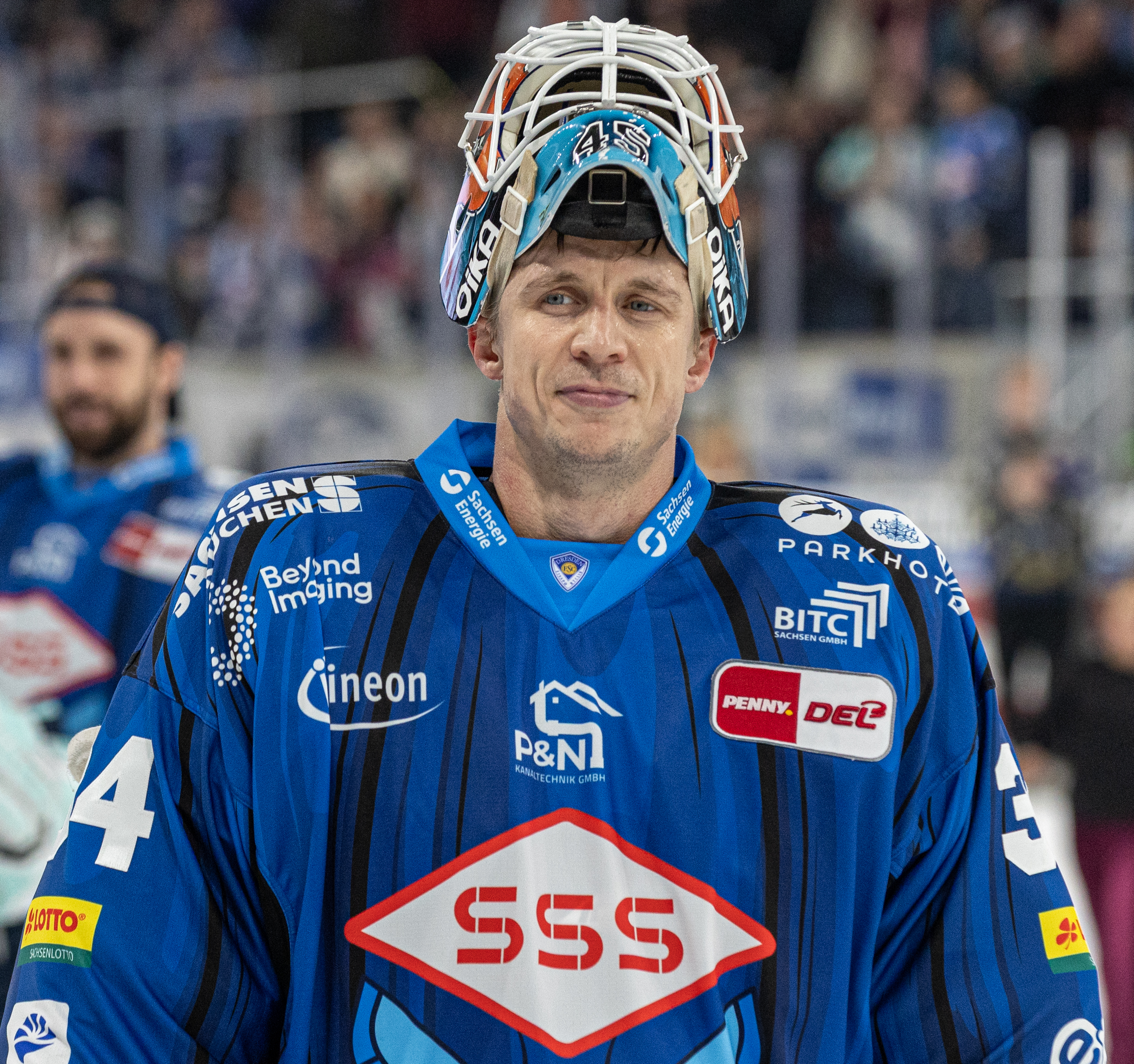
- Olkinuora with Dresdner Eislöwen in 2025
- Born: 4 November 1990 (age 35) Helsinki, Finland
- Height: 6 ft 2 in (188 cm)
- Weight: 201 lb (91 kg; 14 st 5 lb)
- Position: Goaltender
- Catches: Left
- DEL team Former teams: Dresdner Eislöwen; SaiPa; JYP Jyväskylä; Lahti Pelicans; Admiral Vladivostok; Metallurg Magnitogorsk; Brynäs IF; Genève-Servette HC; Löwen Frankfurt
- National team: Finland
- NHL draft: Undrafted
- Playing career: 2010–present

Juho "Jussi" Olkinuora (born 4 November 1990) is a Finnish professional ice hockey goaltender for Dresdner Eislöwen of the Deutsche Eishockey Liga (DEL).

== Playing career ==
Undrafted, Olkinuora played junior hockey in North America before attending the University of Denver to play in the Western Collegiate Hockey Association. He was signed after his sophomore season with the Pioneers by the Winnipeg Jets of the National Hockey League (NHL) on 8 April 2013.

After a career season in his lone year with the Lahti Pelicans of the Liiga in the 2018–19 season, Olkinuora left Finland to sign a one-year contract with Russian club, Admiral Vladivostok of the Kontinental Hockey League (KHL), on 15 May 2019. In the following 2019–20 season, Olkinuora was leaned on as Admiral's starting goaltender, posting a .929 save percentage in 31 games.

On 17 June 2020, with Admiral Vladivostok going on a season hiatus, Olkinuora was signed as a free agent on a two-year contract with fellow KHL club, Metallurg Magnitogorsk.

In March 2022, Olkinuora left Metallurg Magnitogorsk during playoffs due to the Russian invasion of Ukraine.

As a free agent, Olkinuora was signed to a one-year contract with Swiss club EHC Biel of the National League (NL), on 9 May 2022. On 15 June, Olkinuora left Biel after using his NHL-out clause at the deadline, agreeing to a one-year, two-way league minimum contract with the Detroit Red Wings for the 2022–23 season.

Olkinuora was reassigned by the Red Wings following training camp to AHL affiliate, the Grand Rapids Griffins. In sharing starting duties with the Griffins, Olkinuora collected 6 wins through 15 appearances, before he was placed on unconditional waivers by the Red Wings to mutually terminate the remainder of his contract on 31 January 2023. On 3 February 2023, Olkinuora returned to Europe and signed his first contract in Sweden, joining cellar-dwelling Brynäs IF of the SHL for the remainder of the season.

== International play ==
Medal record

Representing Finland

Ice hockey

Olympic Games
Gold medal – first place	2022 Beijing	

World Championships
Gold medal – first place	2019 Slovakia	
Gold medal – first place	2022 Finland	
Silver medal – second place	2021 Latvia	

Olkinuora represented Finland at the 2019 IIHF World Championship, appearing in relief in 1 game as Finland captured the gold medal at the tournament.

At the 2022 World Championships, Olkinuora, as the starting goaltender, backstopped Finland to the Gold Medal over Team Canada. He was selected as the tournament's best goalkeeper with eight wins in 8 games on 29 May 2022.

== Career statistics ==
=== International ===
Year	Team	Event	Result	GP	W	L	OT	MIN	GA	SO	GAA	SV%
2019	Finland	WC	1st place, gold medalist(s)	1	0	0	0	60	0	1	0.00	1.000
2021	Finland	WC	2nd place, silver medalist(s)	7	5	1	0	431	10	1	1.39	.942
2022	Finland	OG	1st place, gold medalist(s)	1	0	1	0	62	3	0	2.90	.900
2022	Finland	WC	1st place, gold medalist(s)	8	8	0	0	486	9	4	1.11	.948
2023	Finland	WC	7th	2	2	0	0	120	4	0	2.00	.846
Senior totals				19	15	2	0	1159	26	6	1.35	.938

== Awards and honours ==
Award	Year	Ref
International
World Championship All-Star Team	2021, 2022	
World Championship Best Goaltender	2022	
World Championship Most Valuable Player	2022	
