= David Sklenička =

Czech ice hockey player (born 1996)

- Born: 8 September 1996 (age 30) Rakovník, Czech Republic
- Height: 5 ft 10 in (178 cm)
- Weight: 180 lb (82 kg; 12 st 12 lb)
- Position: Defence
- Shoots: Left
- NL team Former teams: EV Zug; Jokerit; HC Plzeň; Laval Rocket; Oulun Kärpät; Brynäs IF; Barys Astana; Lausanne HC
- National team: Czech Republic
- NHL draft: Undrafted
- Playing career: 2013–present

David Sklenička (born 8 September 1996) is a Czech professional ice hockey defenceman who is currently playing with EV Zug in the National League (NL).

== Playing career ==
Sklenička made his professional debut playing in Czech Extraliga with HC Plzeň during the 2014–15 Czech Extraliga season as an 18-year old.

In the 2017–18 season, Sklenička played in 49 games on the blueline for Plzeň, registering 14 points and a plus-minus +17 rating. The 21-year-old added one goal and one assist in 10 playoff games.

On May 28, 2018, Sklenička as an undrafted free agent, signed a two-year entry-level contract with the Montreal Canadiens of the National Hockey League (NHL).

Approaching the final year of his contract with the Canadiens in the 2019–20 season, Sklenička continued his tenure with American Hockey League affiliate, the Laval Rocket. After just seven games through the opening months of the season with the Rocket and gaging his chance to appear in the NHL limited, Sklenička was placed on unconditional waivers by the Canadiens and mutually released from his contract on 7 December 2019. On 12 December 2019, he was signed for the remainder of the season to join Finnish club, Jokerit, of the KHL.

After a lone campaign with Brynäs IF in the Swedish Hockey League (SHL) in the 2022–23 season, Sklenička continued his journeyman career in signing a one-year contract with Kazakh-based club, Barys Astana of the KHL, on 1 July 2023.

In May 2024, Sklenička signed a one-year contract to play with the Lausanne HC in the Swiss National League. In June 2025, Sklenička signed a one-year contract to play with EV Zug, staying in Switzerland.

== Career statistics ==
=== Regular season and playoffs ===
			Regular season					Playoffs
Season	Team	League	GP	G	A	Pts	PIM	GP	G	A	Pts	PIM
2012–13	Rytíři Kladno	CZE U18	43	2	8	10	40	3	0	0	0	2
2013–14	HC Medvědi Beroun 1933	CZE.2	42	0	1	1	16	—	—	—	—	—
2014–15	HC Škoda Plzeň	CZE U20	20	1	6	7	38	4	0	1	1	16
2014–15	HC Škoda Plzeň	ELH	6	0	0	0	8	2	0	0	0	2
2014–15	HC Rebel Havlíčkův Brod	CZE.2	31	1	1	2	18	—	—	—	—	—
2015–16	HC Škoda Plzeň	CZE U20	2	1	0	1	2	—	—	—	—	—
2015–16	HC Škoda Plzeň	ELH	46	3	5	8	32	10	0	2	2	6
2015–16	HC Klatovy	CZE.3	1	0	2	2	4	—	—	—	—	—
2016–17	HC Škoda Plzeň	ELH	47	4	5	9	24	11	0	1	1	4
2017–18	HC Škoda Plzeň	ELH	49	3	11	14	22	10	1	1	2	6
2018–19	Laval Rocket	AHL	68	3	6	9	50	—	—	—	—	—
2019–20	Laval Rocket	AHL	7	1	2	3	2	—	—	—	—	—
2019–20	Jokerit	KHL	25	2	3	5	12	6	1	1	2	2
2020–21	Jokerit	KHL	51	7	10	17	26	4	0	0	0	2
2021–22	Jokerit	KHL	45	5	9	14	34	—	—	—	—	—
2021–22	Kärpät	Liiga	9	0	3	3	16	7	0	2	2	0
2022–23	Brynäs IF	SHL	50	7	24	31	22	—	—	—	—	—
2023–24	Barys Astana	KHL	62	8	25	33	40	—	—	—	—	—
2024–25	Lausanne HC	NL	51	3	23	26	34	18	0	7	7	14
ELH totals			148	10	21	31	86	33	1	4	5	18
KHL totals			183	22	47	69	112	10	1	1	2	4
NL totals			51	3	23	26	34	18	0	7	7	14

Medal record

Representing Czech Republic

Ice hockey

World Championships
Bronze medal – third place	2022 Finland	

=== International ===
Year	Team	Event	Result	GP	G	A	Pts	PIM
2016	Czech Republic	WJC	5th	5	1	0	1	2
2018	Czech Republic	WC	7th	8	0	2	2	2
2019	Czech Republic	WC	4th	9	0	1	1	2
2021	Czech Republic	WC	7th	8	0	1	1	4
2022	Czech Republic	OG	9th	4	0	0	0	0
2022	Czech Republic	WC	3rd place, bronze medalist(s)	10	0	1	1	2
Junior totals				5	1	0	1	2
Senior totals				39	0	5	5	10
