= Harri Pesonen =

Finnish ice hockey player (born 1988)

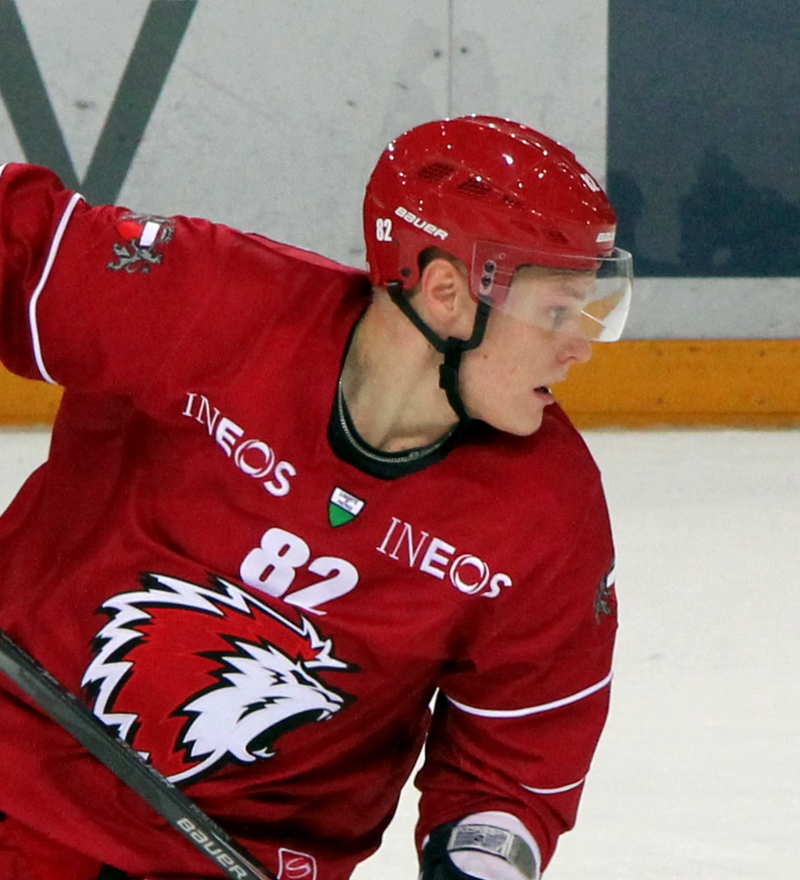
- Harri Pesonen with LHC in 2014
- Born: August 6, 1988 (age 37) Muurame, Finland
- Height: 6 ft 0 in (183 cm)
- Weight: 200 lb (91 kg; 14 st 4 lb)
- Position: Left wing
- Shoots: Left
- NL team Former teams: SCL Tigers; JYP Jyväskylä; New Jersey Devils; Lausanne HC; Metallurg Magnitogorsk; Ak Bars Kazan
- National team: Finland
- NHL draft: Undrafted
- Playing career: 2008–present

Harri Pesonen (born August 6, 1988) is a Finnish professional ice hockey left winger for the SCL Tigers of the National League (NL). He previously played in the NL with Lausanne HC and in the Kontinental Hockey League (KHL) with Metallurg Magnitogorsk and Ak Bars Kazan.

== Playing career ==
Undrafted, Pesonen joined the Devils after seasons with Finnish Liiga club, JYP Jyväskylä on 16 June 2012.

On March 16, 2013, Pesonen made his NHL debut playing with the New Jersey Devils in a loss against the Montreal Canadiens.

After two seasons within the Devils organization and as a restricted free agent, Pesonen signed a two-year contract with Swiss club Lausanne HC of the NLA on May 20, 2014.

On May 8, 2020, Pesonen left the SCL Tigers as a free agent and agreed to a two-year contract with Russian club, Metallurg Magnitogorsk of the Kontinental Hockey League (KHL). In the following 2020–21 season, Pesonen appeared in 33 regular season games with Metallurg, producing six goals and 14 points before he was mutually released from his contract on December 10, 2020. He was later signed for the remainder of the season to continue in the KHL with Ak Bars Kazan on December 24, 2020.

On June 14, 2021, Pesonen returned to Switzerland and the Tigers as a free agent, agreeing to a two-year deal through the 2022–23 season.

== Personal ==
Pesonen's brother Jussi also is a professional hockey player.

== Career statistics ==
=== Regular season and playoffs ===
			Regular season					Playoffs
Season	Team	League	GP	G	A	Pts	PIM	GP	G	A	Pts	PIM
2004–05	JYP	FIN U18	19	6	3	9	6	—	—	—	—	—
2005–06	JYP	FIN U18 Q	9	3	3	6	6	—	—	—	—	—
2005–06	JYP	FIN U18	24	13	14	27	49	—	—	—	—	—
2006–07	JYP	Jr. A	40	8	17	25	10	—	—	—	—	—
2007–08	JYP	Jr. A	37	21	24	45	63	9	4	13	17	33
2007–08	JYP	SM-l	3	0	0	0	0	—	—	—	—	—
2007–08	Suomi U20	Mestis	7	1	2	3	2	—	—	—	—	—
2008–09	JYP	Jr. A	1	0	0	0	2	—	—	—	—	—
2008–09	JYP	SM-l	47	4	3	7	12	15	4	1	5	8
2008–09	D Team	Mestis	10	10	6	16	10	—	—	—	—	—
2009–10	JYP	SM-l	25	4	2	6	35	—	—	—	—	—
2009–10	D Team	Mestis	18	4	3	7	33	11	1	3	4	8
2010–11	JYP	SM-l	54	11	15	26	26	10	4	6	10	6
2010–11	D Team	Mestis	2	0	3	3	4	—	—	—	—	—
2011–12	JYP	SM-l	60	21	14	35	52	14	6	5	11	37
2012–13	Albany Devils	AHL	64	14	17	31	24	—	—	—	—	—
2012–13	New Jersey Devils	NHL	4	0	0	0	2	—	—	—	—	—
2013–14	Albany Devils	AHL	75	15	21	36	52	4	0	1	1	0
2014–15	Lausanne HC	NLA	48	10	19	29	49	7	1	3	4	2
2015–16	Lausanne HC	NLA	50	22	24	46	18	—	—	—	—	—
2016–17	Lausanne HC	NLA	49	15	22	37	20	4	0	2	2	6
2017–18	Lausanne HC	NL	41	12	17	29	34	—	—	—	—	—
2018–19	SCL Tigers	NL	50	21	22	43	40	6	2	2	4	6
2019–20	SCL Tigers	NL	48	18	24	42	44	—	—	—	—	—
2020–21	Metallurg Magnitogorsk	KHL	33	6	8	14	16	—	—	—	—	—
2020–21	Ak Bars Kazan	KHL	17	1	3	4	8	10	1	4	5	8
2021–22	SCL Tigers	NL	50	21	23	44	67	—	—	—	—	—
2022–23	SCL Tigers	NL	52	20	19	39	30	—	—	—	—	—
2023–24	SCL Tigers	NL	49	11	12	23	26	—	—	—	—	—
2024–25	SCL Tigers	NL	49	18	13	31	18	9	0	5	5	27
2025–26	SCL Tigers	NL	45	14	14	28	24	—	—	—	—	—
Liiga totals			189	40	34	74	125	39	14	12	26	51
NHL totals			4	0	0	0	2	—	—	—	—	—
NL totals			531	182	209	391	370	26	3	12	15	41

Medal record

Representing Finland

Ice hockey

Olympic Games
Gold medal – first place	2022 Beijing	

World Championships
Gold medal – first place	2019 Slovakia	
Gold medal – first place	2022 Finland	

=== International ===
Year	Team	Event	Result	GP	G	A	Pts	PIM
2008	Finland	WJC	6th	6	2	1	3	0
2019	Finland	WC	1st place, gold medalist(s)	10	4	3	7	0
2022	Finland	OG	1st place, gold medalist(s)	6	3	1	4	4
2022	Finland	WC	1st place, gold medalist(s)	10	1	5	6	0
2023	Finland	WC	7th	7	1	2	3	2
2025	Finland	WC	7th	8	1	2	3	4
Junior totals				6	2	1	3	0
Senior totals				41	10	13	23	10
