= 2010 LG Hockey Games =

Tournament details
- Host countries: Sweden; Finland
- Cities: Stockholm; Helsinki
- Venues: 2 (in 2 host cities)
- Dates: 29 April – 2 May 2010
- Teams: 4

Final positions
- Champions: Finland (4th title)
- Runners-up: Czech Republic
- Third place: Russia
- Fourth place: Sweden

Tournament statistics
- Games played: 6
- Goals scored: 34 (5.67 per game)
- Attendance: 42,979 (7,163 per game)
- Scoring leader: (Finland) Juhamatti Aaltonen (5 points)

The 2010 LG Hockey Games was played between 29 April and 2 May 2010 in Stockholm, Sweden. The Czech Republic, Finland, Sweden and Russia played a round-robin for a total of three games per team and six games in total. Five of the matches were played in the Stockholm Globe Arena in Stockholm, Sweden, and one match in the Hartwall Areena in Helsinki, Finland. The tournament was won by Finland. The tournament was part of 2009–10 Euro Hockey Tour.

== Standings ==
Pos	Team	Pld	W	OTW	SOW	OTL	SOL	L	GF	GA	GD	Pts
1	Finland	3	1	0	1	0	0	1	11	8	+3	5
2	Czech Republic	3	1	0	1	0	0	1	7	7	0	5
3	Russia	3	1	0	0	0	1	1	10	11	−1	4
4	Sweden	3	1	0	0	0	1	1	6	8	−2	4

Source: swehockey

== Games ==
All times are local. Stockholm – (Central European Time – UTC+1) Helsinki – (Eastern European Time – UTC+2)

29 April 2010; 18:30	Finland	5–4 GWS (2-1, 2-2, 0-1) (OT: 0–0) (SO: 1–0)	Russia	Hartwall Areena, Helsinki; Attendance: 8,281

Game reference

Iiro Tarkki
Goalies
Alexander Yeryomenko
Referees:
(Czech Republic) Vladimír Šindler
(Czech Republic) Milan Minar
Linesmen:
(Finland) Joonas Saha
(Finland) Jussi Terho

	0-1	04:38 – Sergei Mozyakin (Artem Anisimov, Maxim Sushinsky)
05:03 – Riku Hahl (Leo Komarov, Juha-Pekka Hytönen)	1-1
18:58 – Juuso Hietanen (Jori Lehterä, Antti Miettinen)	2-1
22:04 – Juhamatti Aaltonen (Petri Kontiola)	3-1
	3-2	30:03 – Viktor Kozlov (Sergei Fedorov)
31:00 – Juhamatti Aaltonen (Janne Niskala, Petri Kontiola)	4-2
	4-3	33:48 – Maxim Sushinsky (Sergei Mozyakin, Sergei Fedorov)
	4-4	43:48 – Evgeny Artyukhin (Maxim Afinogenov, Alexander Svitov)

Aaltonen
Jokinen (miss)
Nummelin (miss)
Kontiola
Granlund
Shootout
(miss) Mozyakin
(miss) Sushinsky
Kozlov
Mozyakin
(miss) Kozlov
10 min
Penalties
8 min
28
Shots
40

29 April 2010; 19:30	Czech Republic	2-1 GWS (1-0, 0-1, 0-0) (OT: 0–0) (SO: 1–0)	Sweden	Globen, Stockholm; Attendance: 6,654

Game reference
Ondřej Pavelec	Goalies	Jacob Markström	Referees: (Finland) Tom Laaksonen (Finland) Sami Partanen; Linesmen: (Sweden) Peter Lyth (Sweden) Anders Ahlström
17:34 – Lukáš Kašpar (Jiří Novotný) / 1-0; / 1-1 / 24:30 – Victor Hedman (Magnus Pääjärvi, Jimmie Ericsson)			Referees: (Finland) Tom Laaksonen (Finland) Sami Partanen; Linesmen: (Sweden) Peter Lyth (Sweden) Anders Ahlström
Klepiš; Voráček (miss)	Shootout	(miss) Weinhandl; (miss) Pääjärvi; (miss) Omark	Referees: (Finland) Tom Laaksonen (Finland) Sami Partanen; Linesmen: (Sweden) Peter Lyth (Sweden) Anders Ahlström
14 min	Penalties	16 min	Referees: (Finland) Tom Laaksonen (Finland) Sami Partanen; Linesmen: (Sweden) Peter Lyth (Sweden) Anders Ahlström
24	Shots	30	Referees: (Finland) Tom Laaksonen (Finland) Sami Partanen; Linesmen: (Sweden) Peter Lyth (Sweden) Anders Ahlström

1 May 2010; 12:00	Finland	4-1 (0-1, 1-0, 3-0)	Czech Republic	Globen, Stockholm; Attendance: 5,132

Game reference

Harri Säteri
Goalies
Tomáš Vokoun
Referees:
(Sweden) Christer Lärking
(Sweden) Patrik Sjöberg
Linesmen:
(Sweden) Johannes Käck
(Sweden) Peter Sabelström

	0-1	05:36 – Jakub Voráček (Petr Gřegořek, Karel Rachůnek)
33:05 – Teemu Hartikainen (Jori Lehterä, Mikael Granlund)	1-1
47:12 – Anssi Salmela (Mikko Kuukka, Juhamatti Aaltonen)	2-1
52:33 – Petri Kontiola (Juha-Pekka Hytönen, Sami Kapanen)	3-1
56:03 – Sami Kapanen (Petri Kontiola, Juhamatti Aaltonen)	4-1

10 min
Penalties
12 min
29
Shots
22

1 May 2010; 15:30	Sweden	2-4 (0-1, 0-2, 2-1)	Russia	Globen, Stockholm; Attendance: 9,332

Game reference

Jacob Markström
Goalies
Vasily Koshechkin
Referees:
(Czech Republic)
(Czech Republic)
Linesmen:
(Finland)
(Finland)

	0-1	16:12 – Evgeny Ryasensky (Nikolai Belov)
	0-2	38:33 – Maxim Sushinsky (Denis Denisov, Dmitri Kalinin)
	0-3	39:41 – Vitaly Atyushov (Dmitry Kulikov)
	0-4	40:34 – Nikolay Kulemin (Sergei Fedorov)
44:23 – Oliver Ekman-Larsson (Niklas Persson)	1-4
56:57 – Johan Harju (Niklas Persson)	2-4

12 min
Penalties
22 min
36
Shots
31

2 May 2010; 12:00	Russia	2-4 (1-0, 0-2, 1-2)	Czech Republic	Globen, Stockholm; Attendance: 3,545

Game reference

Ondřej Pavelec
Goalies
Anton Khudobin
Referees:
(Sweden) Patrik Sjöberg
(Sweden) Christer Lärking
Linesmen:
(Sweden) Johannes Käck
(Sweden) Daniel Winge

02:32 – Sergei Fedorov (Evgeny Ryasensky)	1-0
	1-1	21:57 – Jiří Novotný (Lukáš Kašpar)
	1-2	37:57 – Petr Koukal (Marek Kvapil, Tomáš Mojžíš)
	1-3	56:49 – Petr Vampola (Martin Růžička, Tomáš Mojžíš)
57:33 – Denis Kulyash (Nikolai Belov, Konstantin Gorovikov)	2-3
	2-4	59:45 – Roman Červenka (Tomáš Rolinek, [[]])

24 min
Penalties
10 min
27
Shots
32

2 May 2010; 15:30	Sweden	3-2 (2-1, 1-1, 0-0)	Finland	Globen, Stockholm; Attendance: 10,035

Game reference

Jonas Gustavsson
Goalies
Iiro Tarkki
Referees:
(Russia) Alexei Ravodin
(Russia) Konstantin Olenin
Linesmen:
(Sweden) Peter Sabelström
(Sweden) Jimmy Dahmén

06:04 – Johan Fransson	1-0
06:28 – Marcus Nilsson (Tony Mårtensson, Magnus Pääjärvi)	2-0
	2-1	10:#0 – Petteri Nummelin (Jori Lehterä, Antti Miettinen)
	2-2	26:07 – Juhamatti Aaltonen
28:13 – Niklas Persson (Johan Harju)	3-2

12 min
Penalties
8 min
23
Shots
29

== Scoring leaders ==
Pos	Player	Country	GP	G	A	Pts	+/−	PIM	POS
1	Juhamatti Aaltonen	Finland	3	3	2	5	+4	0	LW
2	Petri Kontiola	Finland	3	1	3	4	+5	2	CE
3	Sergei Fedorov	Russia	3	1	3	4	+4	4	LD
4	Maxim Sushinsky	Russia	3	2	1	3	+2	2	RW
5	Niklas Persson	Sweden	3	1	2	3	+3	4	RW

GP = Games played; G = Goals; A = Assists; Pts = Points; +/− = Plus/minus; PIM = Penalties in minutes; POS = Position
Source: swehockey

== Goaltending leaders ==
Pos	Player	Country	TOI	GA	GAA	Sv%	SO
1	Ondřej Pavelec	Czech Republic	125:00	3	1.44	97.74	0
2	Jacob Markström	Sweden	122:57	5	2.93	59.09	0
3	Iiro Tarkki	Finland	123:16	7	3.41	88.89	0

TOI = Time on ice (minutes:seconds); SA = Shots against; GA = Goals against; GAA = Goals Against Average; Sv% = Save percentage; SO = Shutouts
Source: swehockey

== Tournament awards ==
The tournament directorate named the following players in the tournament 2010:

- Best goalkeeper: (Czech Republic) Ondřej Pavelec
- Best defenceman: (Russia) Evgeny Ryasensky
- Best forward: (Finland) Juhamatti Aaltonen

Media All-Star Team:

- Goaltender: (Czech Republic) Ondřej Pavelec
- Defence: (Russia) Evgeny Ryasensky, (Finland) Petteri Nummelin
- Forwards: (Finland) Petri Kontiola, (Russia) Sergei Fedorov, (Finland) Juhamatti Aaltonen
