= Grishin =

Grishin (Russian: Гри́шин) (feminine: Grishina) is a Russian surname derived from Grisha, a short form of the name Grigori. The surname literally means Grisha's. Notable people with the surname include:

- Aleksandr Grishin (footballer) (born 1971), Russian football player
- Aleksei Grishin (born 1979), Belarusian Winter Olympic freestyle skier
- Alexandr Grishin (sports commentator) (1978–2025), Russian sports commentator
- Alexei Grishin (ice hockey) (born 1988), Russian ice hockey defenceman
- Anastasia Grishina (born 1996), Russian artistic gymnast
- Anatoli Grishin (canoeist) (1939–2016), Soviet sprint canoer
- Anatoli Aleksandrovich Grishin (born 1986), Russian football player
- Boris Grishin (born 1938), Russian water polo player
- Gennadi Grishin (born 1964), Soviet and Russian football player
- Ivan Grishin (1901–1951), Soviet Colonel general and Hero of the Soviet Union
- Oksana Grishina (disambiguation), multiple people
- Sergey Grishin (footballer, born 1951) (born 1951), Russian football player and team manager
- Sergey Grishin (businessman) (born 1966), Russian entrepreneur
- Sergey Grishin (footballer, born 1973) (born 1973), Russian football player
- Viktor Grishin (1914–1992), Soviet politician, Member of the Politburo (1971–1986)
- Vitali Grishin (born 1980), Russian footballer
- Yelena Grishina (born 1968), Russian fencer
- Yevgeny Grishin (speed skater) (1931–2005), Russian speed skater
- Yevgeny Grishin (water polo) (born 1959), Russian water polo player, son of Boris Grishin
