= Grishina =

Grishina (Russian: Гришина) is the name of several rural localities in Russia:

- Grishina, Arkhangelsk Oblast, a village in Plesetsky District, Arkhangelsk Oblast
- Grishina, Perm Krai, a village in Krasnovishersky District, Perm Krai

== See also ==
- Grishin, a Russian surname of which Grishina is the female form
