= Sergey Grishin =

Sergey Grishin may refer to:

- Sergei Grishin (footballer, born 1951), Russian footballer
- Sergey Grishin (businessman) (1966–2023), Russian engineer, businessman and billionaire
- Sergei Grishin (footballer, born 1973), Russian footballer, son of Sergey Grishin, footballer born 1951
