= Ben Blood =

American ice hockey player (born 1989)

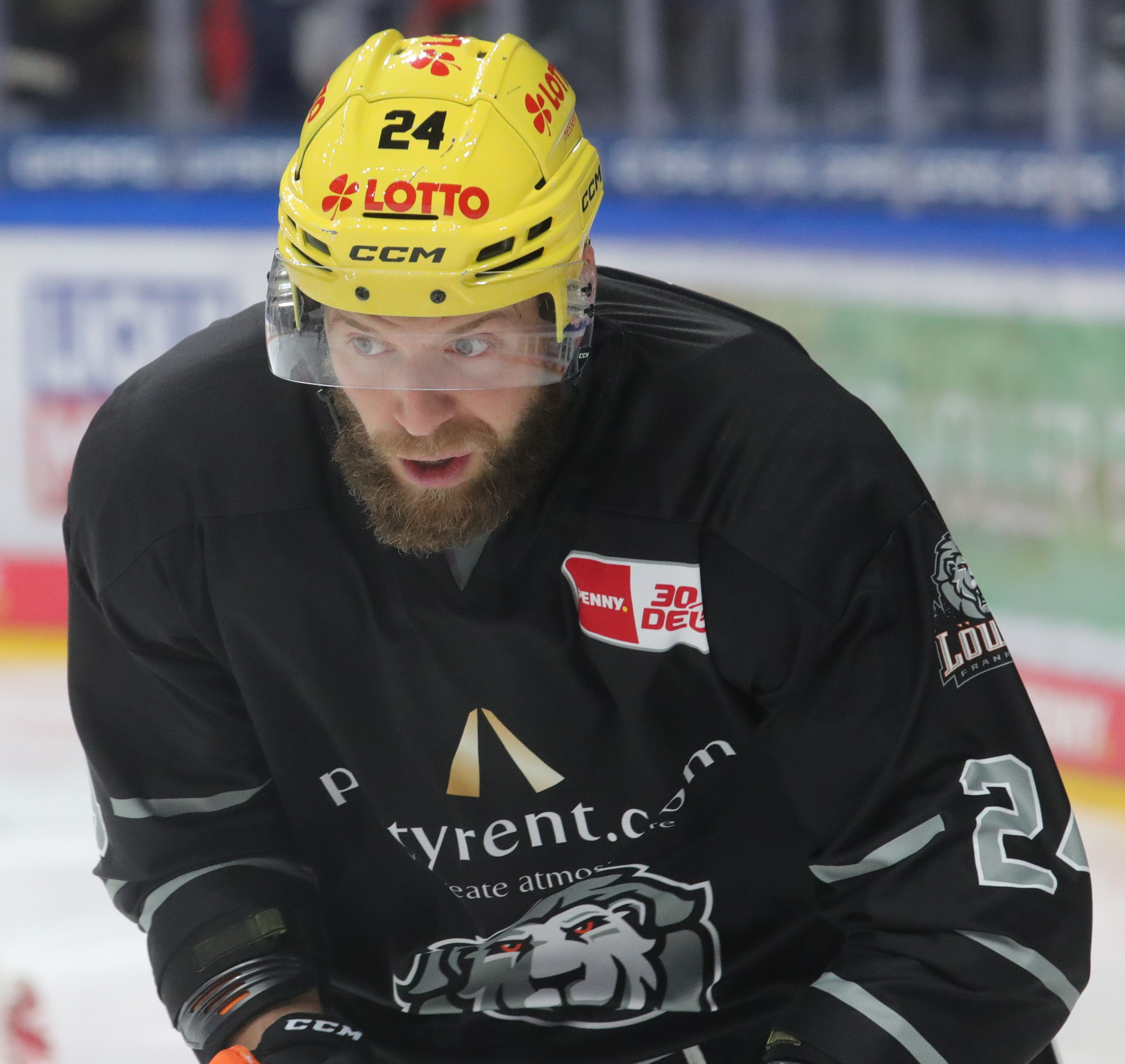
- Blood with the Löwen Frankfurt in 2023
- Born: March 15, 1989 (age 37) Plymouth, Minnesota, U.S.
- Height: 6 ft 4 in (193 cm)
- Weight: 227 lb (103 kg; 16 st 3 lb)
- Position: Defenseman
- Shot: Left
- Played for: Lahti Pelicans; Binghamton Senators; Stjernen Hockey; Ässät; Cardiff Devils; Tappara; Graz99ers; Löwen Frankfurt
- NHL draft: 120th overall, 2007; Ottawa Senators
- Playing career: 2012–2025

Ben Blood (born March 15, 1989) is an American professional ice hockey defenseman. He was drafted in the fourth round, 120th overall, of the 2007 NHL entry draft by the Ottawa Senators.

== Playing career ==
Blood played prep hockey at Shattuck-Saint Mary's for two seasons. He helped them win USA Hockey's Tier I 18 & Under National Championship in 2007.

=== Collegiate ===
Blood played for the University of North Dakota for four seasons while majoring in recreation and tourism studies.

In his freshman season, Blood was named UND's Most Improved Player. He recorded one point that season, an assist, in a game against the Michigan Tech Huskies on March 13, 2009. His sophomore season was more productive. Blood put up 14 points in 43 games and was named to the All-WCHA Academic team and WCHA Final Five All-Tournament team.

In his junior year, Blood played in all 44 games of the season and set a new career high with 10 assists. At the conclusion of the season, he was again named to the All-WCHA Academic team.

In his senior year, Blood set a new career high with 21 points in 42 games. Blood was named an alternate captain for the Sioux at the beginning of the season, however, after an on ice altercation during a January game against Minnesota, he was stripped of his A status. Despite this, Blood was selected for the NCAA (WCHA) Third All-Star Team.

On April 4, 2012, Blood signed a two-year Entry Level Contract with the Ottawa Senators and an amateur tryout contract with the Senators American Hockey League affiliate, the Binghamton Senators so Blood could finish the season with them.

=== Professional ===
Blood began the 2012–13 season with the Binghamton Senators but after three games was reassigned to their ECHL affiliate, the Elmira Jackals. He was periodically moved between the AHL and ECHL until he agreed to terms with the Wheeling Nailers in October 2014. His agreement was short-lived, however, as on November 25, 2014, Blood left the Wheeling Nailers and joined Stjernen Hockey in the GET-ligaen league. The following season, Blood joined the Lahti Pelicans in the Liiga. While playing with the Pelicans, Blood received a two-game suspension due to an altercation with Siim Liivik and a three-game suspension for Cross-checking and injuring Anthony Guttig. On October 30, 2015, Blood signed a two-year contract extension with the Pelicans. On April 11, 2017, Blood left the Pelicans and joined Ässät.

In July 2018, Blood joined the Cardiff Devils of the Elite Ice Hockey League. However, he soon left on November 7, 2018, to re-join the Liiga league with Tappara on a two-year contract.

In May 2021, Blood agreed to terms with Graz 99ers on a one-year contract ahead of the 2021–22 season.

Following a return to Lahti Pelicans, Blood continued his journeyman career in Europe by agreeing to a one-year contract with German club, Löwen Frankfurt of the DEL, on May 26, 2023.

In February 2025, Blood signed a contract with Mestis team Jokerit for the 2024–25 season, which he would later win the Mestis championship with.

== Personal life ==
Blood's sisters, Erin and Molly, both play hockey. Molly played for the Minnesota Thoroughbreds and Erin played NCAA hockey for Boston College. His second cousin Danny Kristo was drafted by the Montreal Canadiens in the 2008 NHL entry draft.

== Career statistics ==
			Regular season					Playoffs
Season	Team	League	GP	G	A	Pts	PIM	GP	G	A	Pts	PIM
2005–06	Shattuck-Saint Mary's	HSMN	58	4	21	25	74	—	—	—	—	—
2006–07	Shattuck-Saint Mary's	HSMN	63	11	25	36	144	—	—	—	—	—
2007–08	Des Moines Buccaneers	USHL	11	0	7	7	17	—	—	—	—	—
2007–08	Indiana Ice	USHL	46	10	6	16	83	4	1	2	3	14
2008–09	University of North Dakota	WCHA	31	0	1	1	12	—	—	—	—	—
2009–10	University of North Dakota	WCHA	43	5	9	14	96	—	—	—	—	—
2010–11	University of North Dakota	WCHA	44	2	10	12	48	—	—	—	—	—
2011–12	University of North Dakota	WCHA	42	3	18	21	73	—	—	—	—	—
2011–12	Binghamton Senators	AHL	4	0	0	0	17	—	—	—	—	—
2012–13	Elmira Jackals	ECHL	32	1	1	2	23	6	0	1	1	9
2012–13	Binghamton Senators	AHL	24	0	0	0	30	—	—	—	—	—
2013–14	Binghamton Senators	AHL	54	0	3	3	61	—	—	—	—	—
2013–14	Elmira Jackals	ECHL	2	0	0	0	0	—	—	—	—	—
2014–15	Wheeling Nailers	ECHL	13	0	2	2	34	—	—	—	—	—
2014–15	Stjernen Hockey	NOR	22	7	12	19	40	4	1	1	2	10
2015–16	Pelicans	Liiga	32	1	7	8	160	—	—	—	—	—
2016–17	Pelicans	Liiga	55	2	8	10	146	5	0	0	0	4
2017–18	Ässät	Liiga	57	3	7	10	207	7	1	0	1	0
2018–19	Cardiff Devils	GBR	12	3	4	7	31	—	—	—	—	—
2018–19	Tappara	Liiga	37	4	14	18	42	11	0	0	0	12
2019–20	Tappara	Liiga	56	2	5	7	22	—	—	—	—	—
2020–21	Tappara	Liiga	35	3	6	9	34	7	0	1	1	10
2021–22	Graz99ers	ICEHL	43	5	9	14	74	2	1	0	1	14
2022–23	Pelicans	Liiga	32	0	5	5	39	18	4	1	5	41
2023–24	Löwen Frankfurt	DEL	37	2	7	9	60	—	—	—	—	—
2023–24	Pelicans	Liiga	12	1	1	2	37	9	0	0	0	14
2024–25	Jokerit	FIN.2	6	0	0	0	8	12	0	3	3	22
Liiga totals			316	16	53	69	687	57	5	2	7	81

== Awards and honors ==
Award	Year	Ref
College
WCHA All-Academic Team	2010, 2011, 2012	
WCHA All-Tournament Team	2010	
WCHA Third All-Star Team	2012	
