= Juhamatti Aaltonen =

Finnish ice hockey player (born 1985)

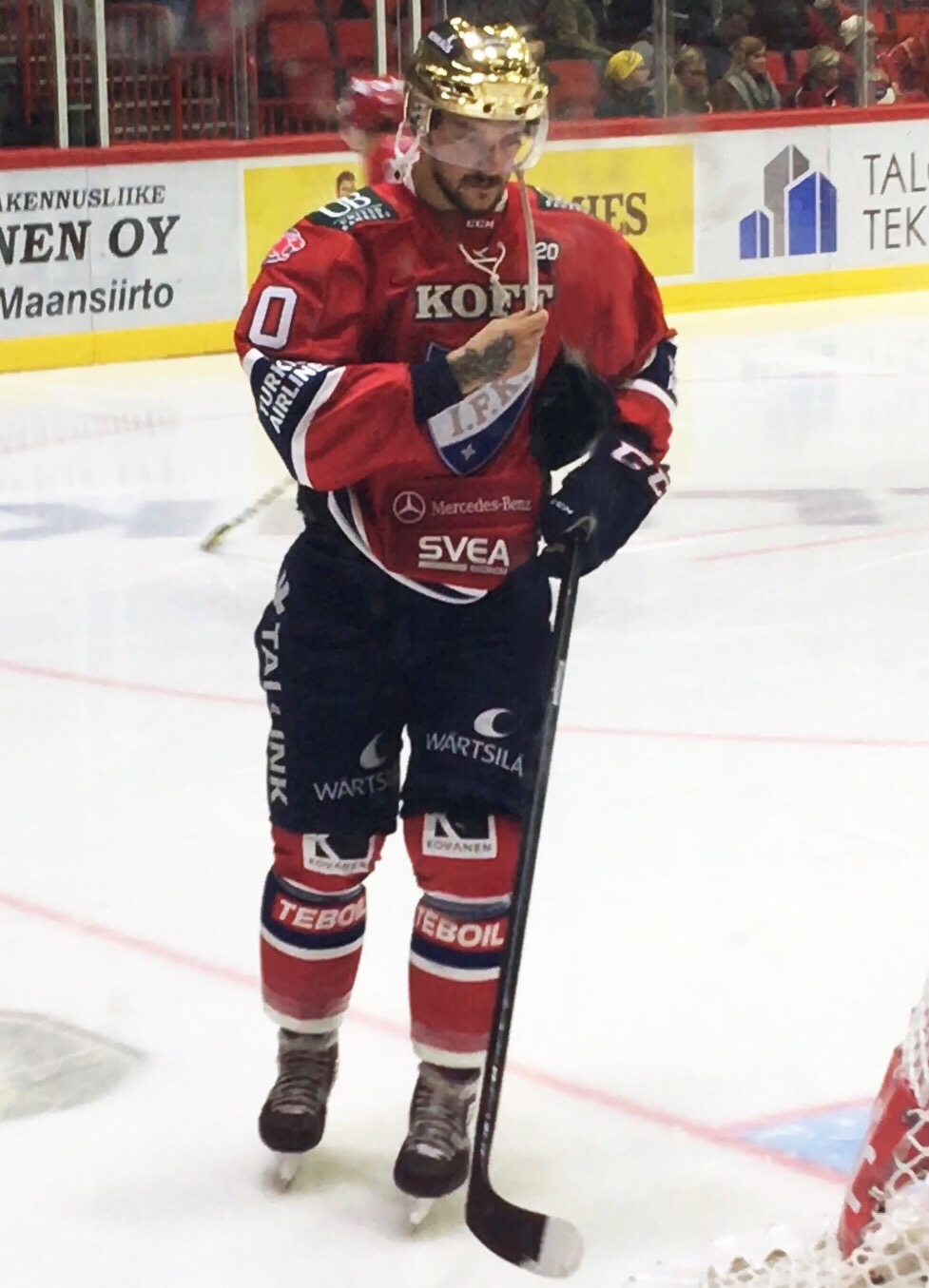
- Aaltonen in 2016 with HIFK
- Born: 4 June 1985 (age 40) Ii, Finland
- Height: 6 ft 0 in (183 cm)
- Weight: 196 lb (89 kg; 14 st 0 lb)
- Position: Right wing
- Shot: Right
- Played for: Oulun Kärpät; Lahti Pelicans; Metallurg Magnitogorsk; Rögle BK; Jokerit; HIFK; SC Bern; Skellefteå AIK; Mikkelin Jukurit; BK Mladá Boleslav; Esbjerg Energy
- National team: Finland
- NHL draft: 284th overall, 2003; St. Louis Blues
- Playing career: 2004–2025

Juhamatti Tapio Aaltonen (born 4 June 1985) is a Finnish former professional ice hockey winger. Known for his skill and skating speed, Aaltonen was drafted by the St. Louis Blues as the 248th selection overall in the 2003 NHL entry draft.

== Playing career ==
Aaltonen started his professional career with Oulun Kärpät, playing with the team from 2002 to 2009, winning Finnish championship twice. After the years he spent with Kärpät, Aaltonen moved to Lahti to play for Pelicans, where he played his breakthrough year, scoring 28 goals and 49 points in 58 games in the regular season. He signed a five-year contract with the Pelicans, but the contract also gave Aaltonen the possibility to play in other leagues.

This option in his contract was exercised on 15 June 2010, when he was loaned from the Pelicans to Russian club, Metallurg Magnitogorsk of the KHL. Aaltonen was an integral part of Metallurg's offense in his two seasons in the KHL before he opted to sign with Swedish club, Rögle BK of the then Elitserien on 15 October 2012. He made his debut in Sweden two-days later and in the 2012–13 season, contributed with 31 points in 42 regular season games.

After a season-long return with his original Finnish club, Kärpät, Aaltonen signed for his third Finnish team, and only KHL participant, Jokerit, on 1 August 2014. After Jokerit he had a season with Helsinki IFK in Liiga moving to SHL with Rögle BK for the 2017–18 season. After the 2022–23 SHL season he left Scandinavia for a new experience and joined BK Mladá Boleslav playing the Czech Extraliga.

On 8 August 2025, Aaltonen announced his retirement from professional hockey playing over 1,000 games.

== International play ==
Following the season 2009–10 season, he was selected to join the Finland men's national ice hockey team and he played at the 2010 IIHF World Championship. He won the World Championship in 2011 IIHF World Championship. He also played in the 2014 Winter Olympics, scoring the game-tying goal against Russia in the quarterfinal and went on to win bronze.

== Career statistics ==
=== Regular season and playoffs ===
			Regular season					Playoffs
Season	Team	League	GP	G	A	Pts	PIM	GP	G	A	Pts	PIM
2001–02	Kärpät	FIN U18	23	9	20	28	2	0	0	0	0
2002–03	Kärpät	FIN U18	2	5	1	6	6	—	—	—	—	—
2002–03	Kärpät	FIN U20	33	19	3	22	30	1	0	0	0	7
2002–03	Kärpät	SM-l	1	0	0	0	0	—	—	—	—	—
2003–04	Kärpät	FIN U20	32	30	15	45	32	3	1	0	1	2
2003–04	Kärpät	SM-l	8	0	0	0	2	—	—	—	—	—
2004–05	Kärpät	FIN U20	34	27	23	50	38	5	0	2	2	22
2004–05	Kärpät	SM-l	6	0	0	0	0	—	—	—	—	—
2005–06	Kärpät	SM-l	50	13	12	25	28	9	0	0	0	0
2006–07	Kärpät	SM-l	53	11	21	32	48	10	1	4	5	6
2007–08	Kärpät	SM-l	44	9	17	26	20	15	3	2	5	4
2008–09	Kärpät	SM-l	53	11	21	32	14	15	3	6	9	2
2009–10	Pelicans	SM-l	58	28	21	49	56	—	—	—	—	—
2010–11	Metallurg Magnitogorsk	KHL	54	20	19	39	22	20	6	3	9	16
2011–12	Metallurg Magnitogorsk	KHL	54	22	9	31	26	8	1	2	3	2
2012–13	Rögle BK	SEL	42	12	19	31	22	—	—	—	—	—
2013–14	Kärpät	Liiga	35	12	19	31	38	16	8	7	15	6
2014–15	Jokerit	KHL	48	10	24	34	28	10	4	2	6	22
2015–16	Jokerit	KHL	45	15	13	28	14	6	0	1	1	0
2016–17	HIFK	Liiga	52	19	20	39	28	13	0	5	5	2
2017–18	Rögle BK	SHL	35	8	11	19	14	—	—	—	—	—
2017–18	SC Bern	NL	2	1	1	2	0	3	1	1	2	0
2018–19	Skellefteå AIK	SHL	35	1	8	9	6	—	—	—	—	—
2018–19	Pelicans	Liiga	11	9	4	13	8	6	1	4	5	0
2019–20	Pelicans	Liiga	48	17	20	37	22	—	—	—	—	—
2019–20	Kärpät	Liiga	12	2	5	7	2	—	—	—	—	—
2020–21	Kärpät	Liiga	32	7	20	27	16	5	2	4	6	2
2021–22	Kärpät	Liiga	58	14	21	35	30	7	1	2	3	2
2022–23	Jukurit	Liiga	51	10	24	34	18	—	—	—	—	—
2023–14	BK Mladá Boleslav	ELH	25	5	11	16	8	—	—	—	—	—
2023–24	Esbjerg Energy	DEN	7	3	6	9	2	—	—	—	—	—
2023–24	Pelicans	Liiga	11	2	4	6	4	17	1	3	4	2
2024–25	Jokerit	Mestis	30	10	14	24	8	13	5	13	18	4
Liiga totals			583	163	229	392	334	113	20	37	57	26
KHL totals			201	67	65	132	90	44	11	8	19	40

=== International ===
Medal record

Representing Finland

Ice hockey

Olympic Games
Bronze medal – third place	2014 Sochi	

World Championships
Gold medal – first place	2011 Slovakia	

Year	Team	Event	GP	G	A	Pts	PIM
2003	Finland	U18	6	0	1	1	4
2010	Finland	WC	7	1	2	3	2
2011	Finland	WC	9	1	2	3	6
2013	Finland	WC	10	4	7	11	4
2014	Finland	OG	4	1	0	1	2
2015	Finland	WC	8	1	3	4	2
2017	Finland	WC	5	0	3	3	0
Junior totals			6	0	1	1	4
Senior totals			43	8	17	25	16
