= Leo Komarov =

Finnish ice hockey player (born 1987)

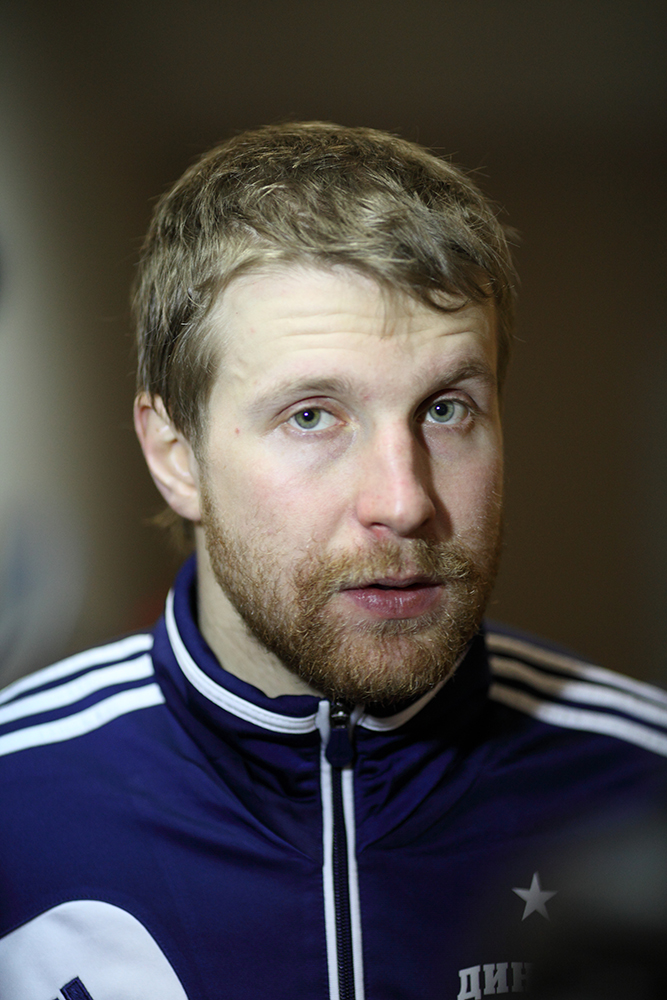
- Komarov in 2012
- Born: 23 January 1987 (age 39) Narva, then part of Estonian SSR, Soviet Union
- Height: 5 ft 10 in (178 cm)
- Weight: 209 lb (95 kg; 14 st 13 lb)
- Position: Forward
- Shoots: Left
- Liiga team Former teams: Kiekko-Espoo; Ässät; Pelicans; Dynamo Moscow; Toronto Maple Leafs; New York Islanders; SKA Saint Petersburg; Luleå HF; HIFK; HC Davos
- National team: Finland
- NHL draft: 180th overall, 2006; Toronto Maple Leafs
- Playing career: 2005–present

Leonid Aleksandrovich Komarov (Russian: Леонид Александрович Комаров, Finnish: Leonid "Leo" Aleksandrovitš Komarov; born 23 January 1987) is an Estonian-born Finnish professional ice hockey player who is a forward for Kiekko-Espoo of the Liiga.

Born to an ethnic Russian–Finnish family with Ingrian background in Estonia, and raised in Finland, Komarov plays for Finland internationally. A natural centre early in his career, Komarov has made the transition to being able to play all three forward positions.

Komarov was a member of the gold medal-winning Finnish national teams in the 2011 IIHF World Championship and 2022 Winter Olympics.

== Playing career ==
After playing with different junior teams, Komarov began his professional career in the Finnish SM-liiga with Ässät. Komarov won a silver medal with Ässät in 2006. After his season with Ässät, he was chosen in the sixth round of the 2006 NHL entry draft, 180th overall, by the Toronto Maple Leafs. after the 2005–06 season with Ässät, Komarov moved to the Lahti Pelicans.

Komarov captained Finland at the 2007 World Junior Ice Hockey Championships in Leksand and Mora, Sweden.

During the 2009–10 season, Komarov played with Dynamo Moscow of the Kontinental Hockey League (KHL).

Komarov won a gold medal with Finland at the 2011 IIHF World Championships in Bratislava and Košice, Slovakia.

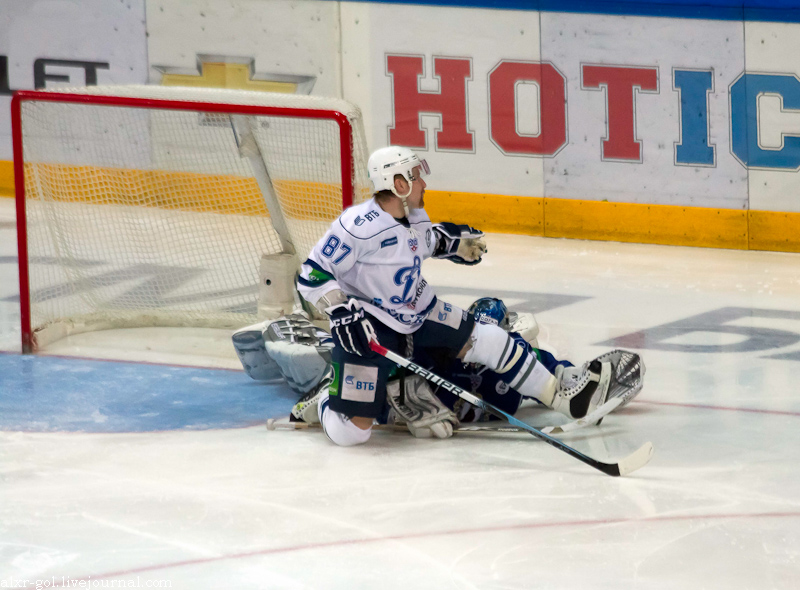
Komarov screens Ján Lašák during a KHL game in 2011.

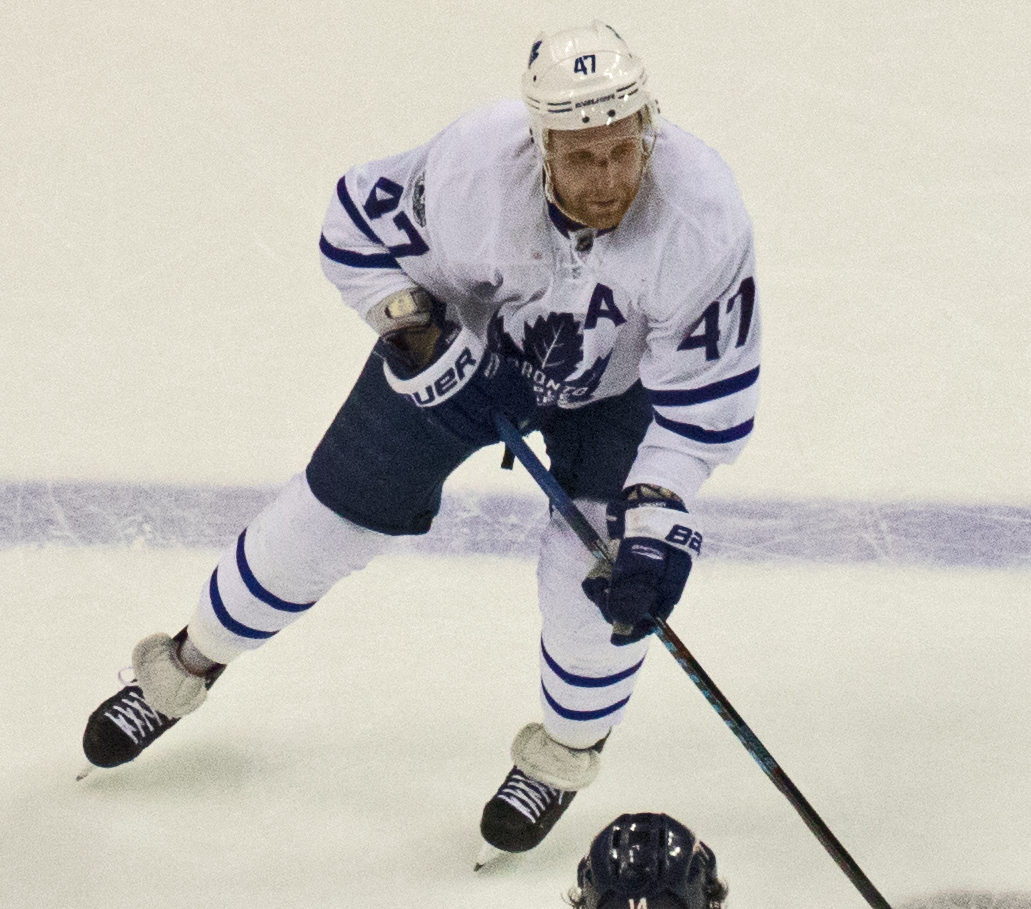
Komarov with the Toronto Maple Leafs during the 2017 Stanley Cup playoffs.

In May 2012, Komarov agreed to a contract with the Toronto Maple Leafs for the 2012–13 season. The reported value of his contract was $1.2 million, including bonuses. He played his first career NHL game on 19 January 2013, and he scored his first NHL goal (a game-winner) against the Montreal Canadiens on 9 February 2013.

After one season with the Maple Leafs, Komarov left the NHL to sign a one-year contract to return with Dynamo Moscow in June 2013, with the ambition to make the Finnish 2014 Winter Olympic squad in a more offensive role with Dynamo; he made the roster, also serving as an alternate captain.

Despite signing with Dynamo Moscow, Komarov said he was not done with the NHL, and one year later, on 1 July 2014, he signed a four-year deal worth $2.9 million per season to return to the Maple Leafs. Komarov played well following the signing, recording 4 goals and 16 assists in his first 23 games of the season, as well as 99 hits, enough for third in the NHL as of late November. However, a blindside hit from former Dynamo Moscow linemate Alexander Ovechkin on 29 November left Komarov with concussion issues, and he would score at a lackluster pace for the rest of the season.

Komarov would rebound the next season and excel under new head coach Mike Babcock. Komarov, who previously played on Toronto's second, third lines and fourth lines, was now experiencing top-line duties (taking Phil Kessel's spot), and occasionally reprising his role on the second. He led the Maple Leafs in goals and points up to the Christmas break. Shortly after, he was named to the 2016 NHL All-Star Game on 6 January 2016. Komarov had 27 points in 37 games when named an All-Star, including 15 goals, and was one point behind teammate James van Riemsdyk for the team lead in scoring. Given Komarov's reputation and traditional NHL role as a bottom six grinder, he had not expected to be named an All-Star, going as far as to book a vacation during the All-Star break, which was cancelled after he had been named to the festivities. Komarov's production declined in the latter half of the season, partially due to the loss of van Riemsdyk in January to injury. Despite this, Komarov finished the year third in team scoring with 36 points, behind only P. A. Parenteau and Nazem Kadri. The following season, he shared a line with Kadri and rookie winger Connor Brown. In 2017, Komarov played in the NHL Centennial Classic where he scored one goal in Toronto's 5–4 overtime win against the Detroit Red Wings. In 2018, Komarov played in the 2018 NHL Stadium Series against the Washington Capitals, where the Leafs lost 2–5.

On 1 July 2018, Komarov signed a four-year, $3 million per year contract with the New York Islanders. After playing one NHL game at the start of the 2021–22 NHL season, Komarov was assigned to the Islanders' American Hockey League (AHL) affiliate, the Bridgeport Islanders, when he cleared waivers. On 15 November 2021, Komarov signed a two-year contract with SKA Saint Petersburg of the Kontinental Hockey League (KHL). On 4 September 2022, Komarov signed a one-year contract with Luleå HF of the Swedish Hockey League (SHL).

On 23 August 2023, Komarov signed a two-year contract with HIFK of Finland's Liiga. After the 2024–25 season, HIFK confirmed that Komarov will not continue in the team.

In December 2025, Komarov won the 2025 Spengler Cup with HC Davos as he joined the team exclusively for the tournament.

Komarov signed a season-long contract with Kiekko-Espoo of the Liiga on 19 January 2026.

== Personal life ==
Komarov was born in Narva, Estonian SSR, to Russian-speaking parents. When he was five years old, Komarov's family moved to Nykarleby, Finland, when his father Alexander Komarov accepted a contract to play ice hockey there. Because of his father's Ingrian Finnish descent, the family was eligible for Finnish citizenship and thus able to permanently reside there. Leo's father is an Ingrian Finn from Petrozavodsk, Karelia. Leo Komarov also holds dual Russian and Finnish citizenship and reportedly can speak four languages (Russian, Swedish, Finnish, and English).

Komarov is married to Juulia Manner. The pair tied the knot on 2 July 2016 in Helsinki, after dating for ten years. They have two children.

In 2017, Komarov became a global betting ambassador for the European betting website NordicBet, making him the first active NHL player to endorse a betting platform.

== Career statistics ==
=== Regular season and playoffs ===
			Regular season					Playoffs
Season	Team	League	GP	G	A	Pts	PIM	GP	G	A	Pts	PIM
2002–03	Hermes	FIN U16	14	7	12	19	8	—	—	—	—	—
2003–04	Sport	FIN U18	19	6	9	15	6	—	—	—	—	—
2004–05	Ässät	FIN U18	9	4	5	9	62	—	—	—	—	—
2004–05	Ässät	FIN U20	34	6	5	11	59	—	—	—	—	—
2005–06	Ässät	FIN U20	10	5	6	11	59	—	—	—	—	—
2005–06	Ässät	SM-l	44	3	3	6	106	14	1	3	4	22
2005–06	Suomi U20	Mestis	5	0	3	3	4	—	—	—	—	—
2006–07	Pelicans	SM-l	49	3	9	12	108	6	1	0	1	6
2006–07	Suomi U20	Mestis	1	1	0	1	0	—	—	—	—	—
2007–08	Pelicans	FIN U20	2	0	3	3	0	—	—	—	—	—
2007–08	Pelicans	SM-l	53	4	10	14	76	6	1	1	2	8
2008–09	Pelicans	SM-l	56	8	16	24	144	10	0	1	1	16
2009–10	Dynamo Moscow	KHL	47	5	11	16	44	4	0	1	1	16
2010–11	Dynamo Moscow	KHL	52	14	12	26	70	6	4	2	6	2
2011–12	Dynamo Moscow	KHL	46	11	13	24	58	20	5	2	7	49
2012–13	Toronto Marlies	AHL	14	6	3	9	22	—	—	—	—	—
2012–13	Dynamo Moscow	KHL	13	2	8	10	42	—	—	—	—	—
2012–13	Toronto Maple Leafs	NHL	42	4	5	9	18	7	0	0	0	17
2013–14	Dynamo Moscow	KHL	52	12	22	34	42	7	3	1	4	22
2014–15	Toronto Maple Leafs	NHL	62	8	18	26	18	—	—	—	—	—
2015–16	Toronto Maple Leafs	NHL	67	19	17	36	40	—	—	—	—	—
2016–17	Toronto Maple Leafs	NHL	82	14	18	32	31	6	0	1	1	2
2017–18	Toronto Maple Leafs	NHL	74	7	12	19	31	2	0	0	0	0
2018–19	New York Islanders	NHL	82	6	20	26	42	8	1	1	2	8
2019–20	New York Islanders	NHL	48	4	10	14	10	17	1	2	3	2
2020–21	New York Islanders	NHL	33	1	7	8	15	19	0	3	3	14
2021–22	New York Islanders	NHL	1	0	0	0	2	—	—	—	—	—
2021–22	SKA Saint Petersburg	KHL	18	4	2	6	12	16	1	2	3	6
2022–23	Luleå HF	SHL	49	9	9	18	26	5	0	1	1	27
2023–24	HIFK	Liiga	16	3	1	4	45	4	0	0	0	25
2024–25	HIFK	Liiga	39	6	13	19	30	2	0	0	0	0
2025–26	Kiekko–Espoo	Liiga	17	1	6	7	29	4	1	0	1	2
Liiga totals			274	28	58	86	538	46	4	5	9	79
KHL totals			228	48	68	116	268	53	13	8	21	95
NHL totals			491	63	107	170	207	59	2	7	9	45

=== International ===
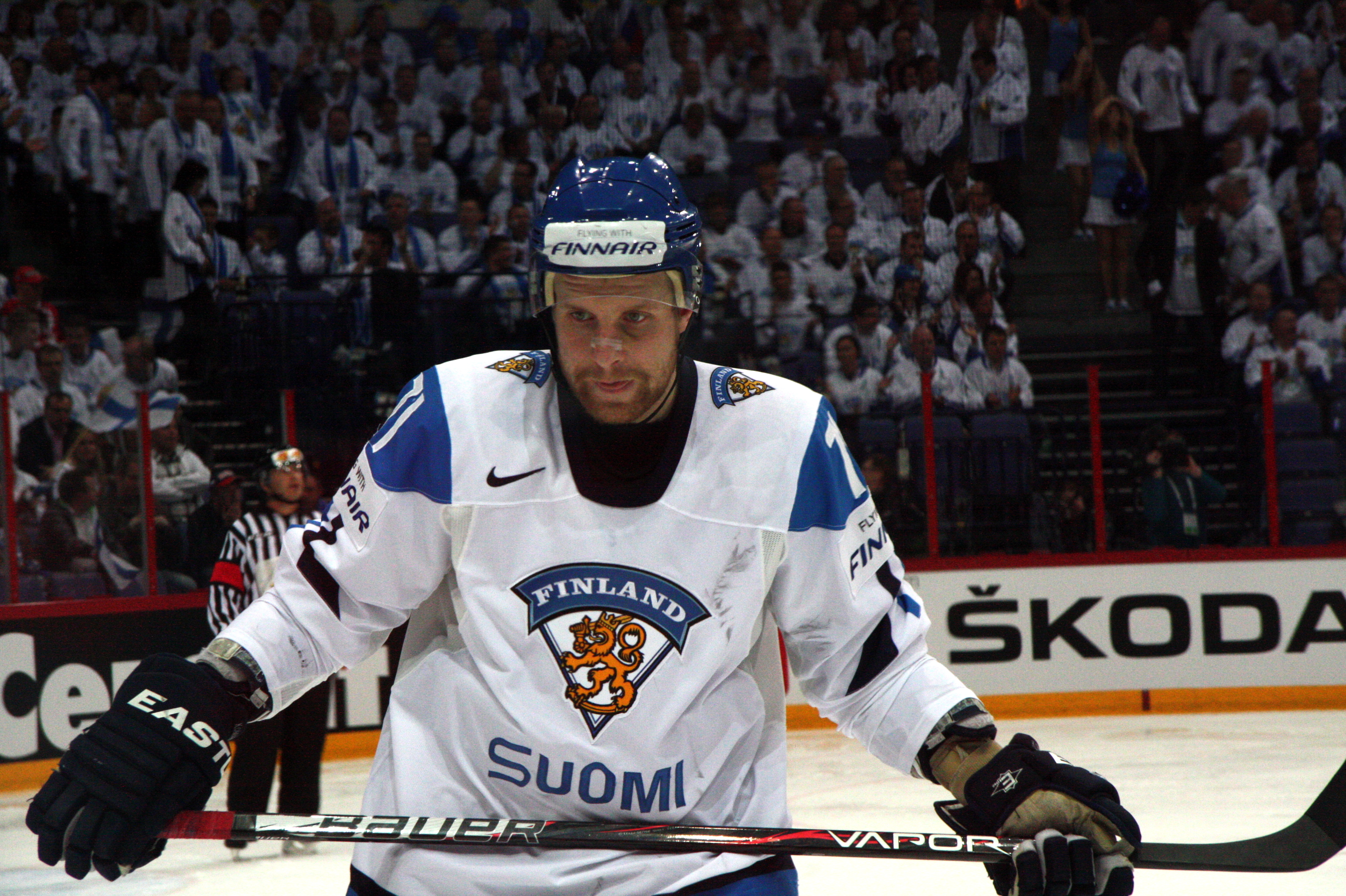

Medal record

Representing Finland

Ice hockey

Olympic Games
Gold medal – first place	2022 Beijing	
Bronze medal – third place	2014 Sochi	

World Championships
Gold medal – first place	2011 Slovakia	
Silver medal – second place	2014 Belarus	
Silver medal – second place	2016 Russia	

World Junior Championships
Bronze medal – third place	2006 Canada	

Year	Team	Event	Result	GP	G	A	Pts	PIM
2006	Finland	WJC	3rd place, bronze medalist(s)	7	0	3	3	32
2007	Finland	WJC	6th	6	2	1	3	16
2009	Finland	WC	5th	5	0	1	1	4
2010	Finland	WC	6th	7	1	0	1	0
2011	Finland	WC	1st place, gold medalist(s)	8	0	2	2	2
2012	Finland	WC	4th	10	1	0	1	4
2014	Finland	OG	3rd place, bronze medalist(s)	6	0	0	0	0
2014	Finland	WC	2nd place, silver medalist(s)	10	1	2	3	6
2015	Finland	WC	6th	7	2	1	3	29
2016	Finland	WC	2nd place, silver medalist(s)	10	3	4	7	8
2016	Finland	WCH	8th	3	0	1	1	2
2022	Finland	OG	1st place, gold medalist(s)	6	1	0	1	2
Junior totals				13	2	4	6	48
Senior totals				72	9	11	20	57

=== All-Star Game ===
Year	Location	GP	G	A	Pts
2016	Nashville	2	0	1	1
All-Star totals		2	0	1	1

== Awards and honours ==
- SM-liiga, Runners-up – 2005–06
- Karjala Tournament, Winner – 2013
- Channel One Cup, Winner – 2009
- Sweden Hockey Games, Winner – 2010, 2014
- Euro Hockey Tour, Winner – 2009–10
- 2011 – Medal "For military cooperation"
- IIHF World Champion – 2011
- IIHF World Championship, Runners-up – 2014, 2016
- KHL All-Star Game – 2011, 2014 participant
- KHL, Gagarin Cup – 2011–12, 2012–13
- 2013 – First Estonian born NHL player
- 2016 – NHL All-Star Game participant
- Spengler Cup, Winner – 2025
