= Valtteri Filppula =

Finnish ice hockey player (born 1984)

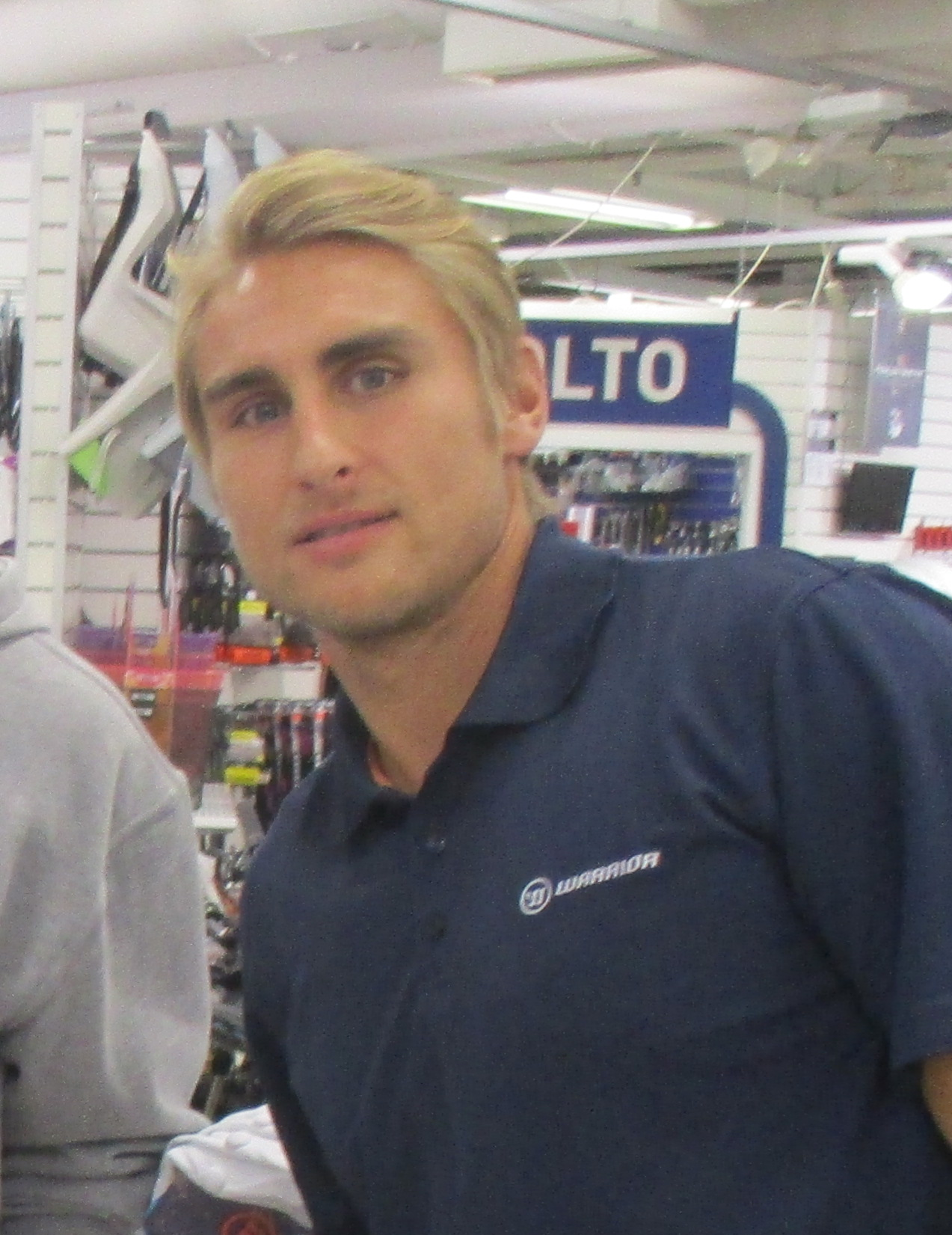
- Filppula in 2016
- Born: 20 March 1984 (age 42) Vantaa, Finland
- Height: 6 ft 0 in (183 cm)
- Weight: 185 lb (84 kg; 13 st 3 lb)
- Position: Centre
- Shot: Left
- Played for: Jokerit; Detroit Red Wings; Tampa Bay Lightning; Philadelphia Flyers; New York Islanders; Genève-Servette HC
- National team: Finland
- NHL draft: 95th overall, 2002; Detroit Red Wings
- Playing career: 2003–2025

Valtteri Filppula (born 20 March 1984) is a Finnish former professional ice hockey forward.

Filppula won the Stanley Cup with the Detroit Red Wings in 2008. He has previously played with the Red Wings, Tampa Bay Lightning, Philadelphia Flyers, and New York Islanders. He led Finland to a gold medal at the 2022 Winter Olympics and the 2022 IIHF World Championship, which made him the first Finnish member of the Triple Gold Club.

== Playing career ==
=== Detroit Red Wings (2005–2013) ===
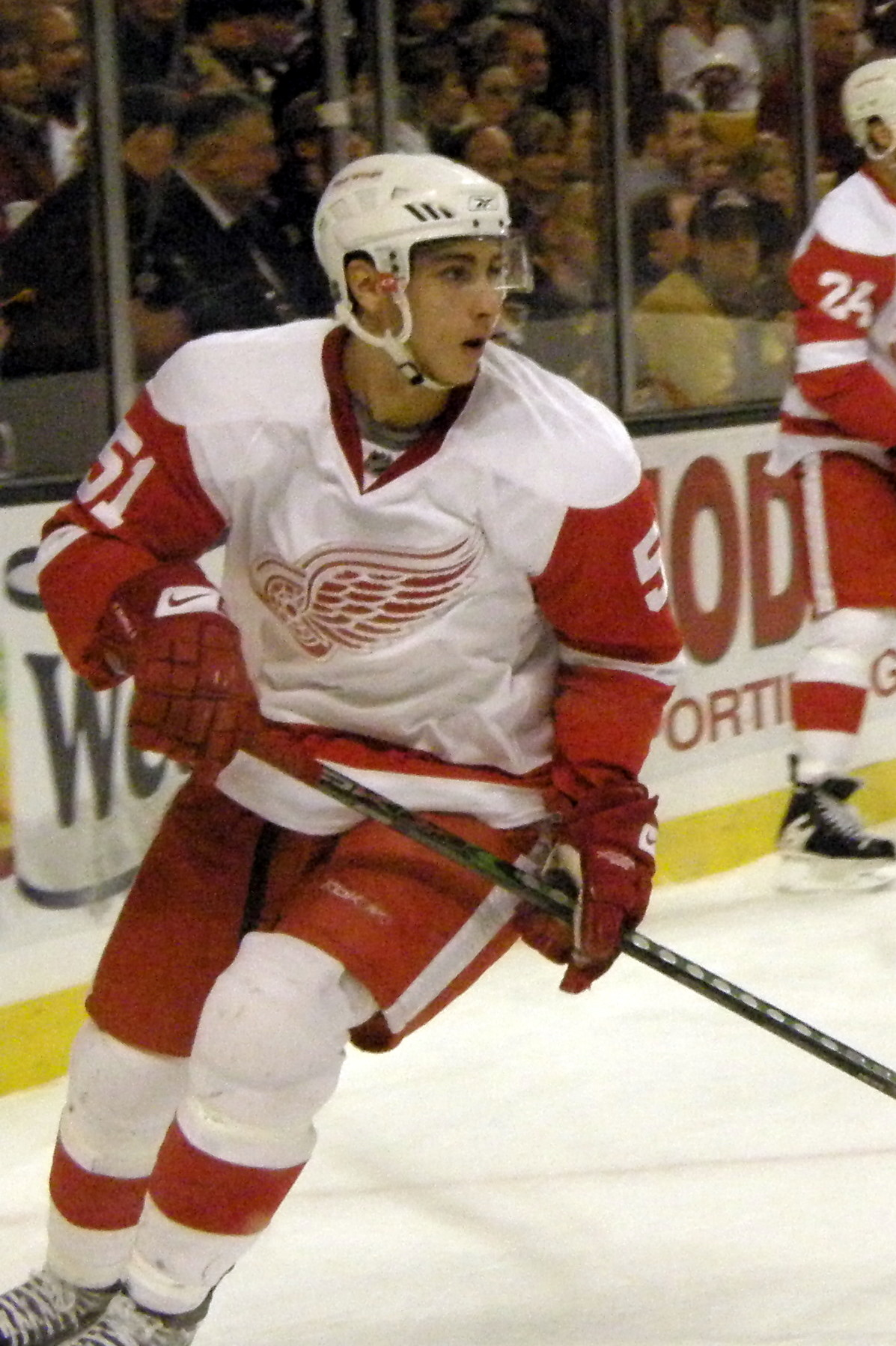
Filppula with the Detroit Red Wings in February 2008

Filppula was drafted by the Detroit Red Wings in the third round, 95th overall, in the 2002 NHL entry draft. He started his hockey career with the Jokerit organization and secured his place in the SM-liiga team in the 2003–04 season as an offensive forward. He won the SM-liiga silver medal with Jokerit in 2005 and was set to become the team's number one center for the next season. However, Filppula moved to North America to play for the Grand Rapids Griffins of the American Hockey League (AHL), the top minor league affiliate of the Detroit Red Wings. He was selected to play for PlanetUSA in the 2005–06 AHL All-Star Game.

On 15 December 2005, Filppula made his NHL debut with the Red Wings, becoming the first Finnish player ever to play an NHL game for Detroit. He scored his first NHL goal on 28 October 2006, against former Red Wing goaltender Manny Legace in a game against the St. Louis Blues. He then scored his first playoff career goal in game one of the 2007 Stanley Cup playoffs against the Calgary Flames on 12 April 2007, his first post-season game. Filppula continued playing for the Red Wings and scored 36 points in his third season for the team in the 2007–08 season. He won the Stanley Cup when the Red Wings defeated the Pittsburgh Penguins in six games in the 2008 Stanley Cup Final. He scored the second goal for Detroit in the decisive sixth game of the series, in which the Red Wings won 3–2.

On 30 July 2008, Filppula signed a five-year, $15-million contract extension with Detroit, avoiding salary arbitration.

On 21 September 2012, Filppula signed with his former team club Jokerit in Finland due to the 2012–13 NHL lockout that halted play. He returned to the Red Wings after the lockout, as his contract with Jokerit was signed to last as long as the lockout did.

=== Tampa Bay Lightning (2013–2017) ===
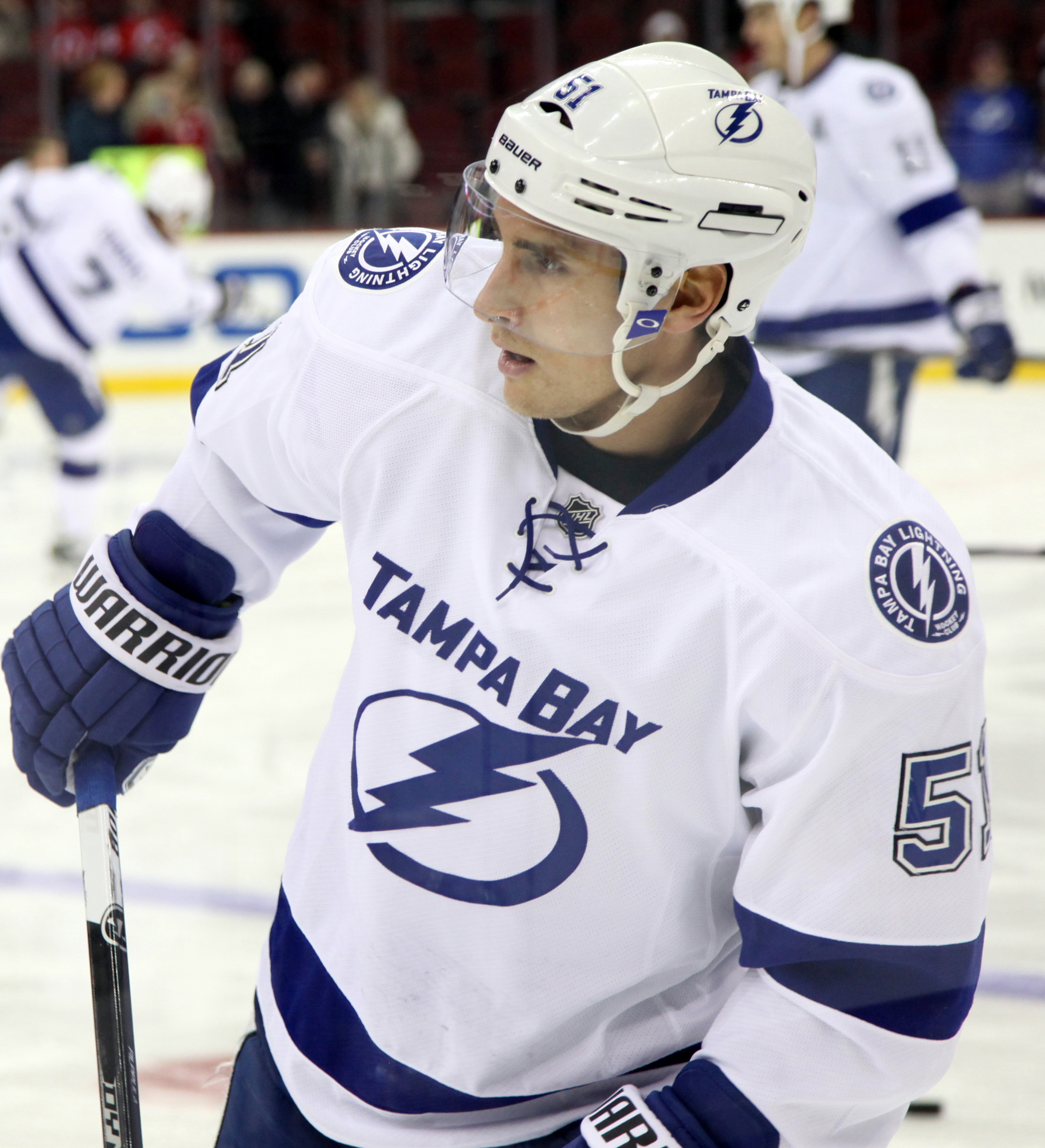
Flippula as a member of the Tampa Bay Lightning in December 2014

On 5 July 2013, Filppula signed a five-year, $25 million contract as an unrestricted free agent with the Tampa Bay Lightning. On 1 December 2014, Filppula recorded his 200th NHL assist in a 6–3 Tampa Bay Lightning win over the New York Rangers. On 6 January 2015, Filppula played in his 600th NHL game in a 4–2 Lightning win over the Montreal Canadiens.

=== Philadelphia Flyers (2017–2018) ===
The Lightning dealt Filppula on 1 March 2017, hours before the NHL Trade Deadline, to the Philadelphia Flyers, along with a 2017 4th-round draft pick and a conditional 7th-round draft pick, in exchange for defenseman Mark Streit. Streit was immediately traded to the Pittsburgh Penguins for a draft pick. The moves allowed for Tampa Bay to clear Filppula's $5 million salary cap hit and protect another player in the 2017 NHL expansion draft due to his no-trade clause. Filppula reportedly rejected a transaction two days earlier that would've sent him to the Toronto Maple Leafs along with Lightning teammate Brian Boyle. Filppula made his Flyers debut on 2 March, a 2–1 shootout win against the Florida Panthers in which he scored the tying goal and was awarded the game's third star. Prior to the 2017–18 season the Flyers named Filppula an alternate captain along with Andrew MacDonald.

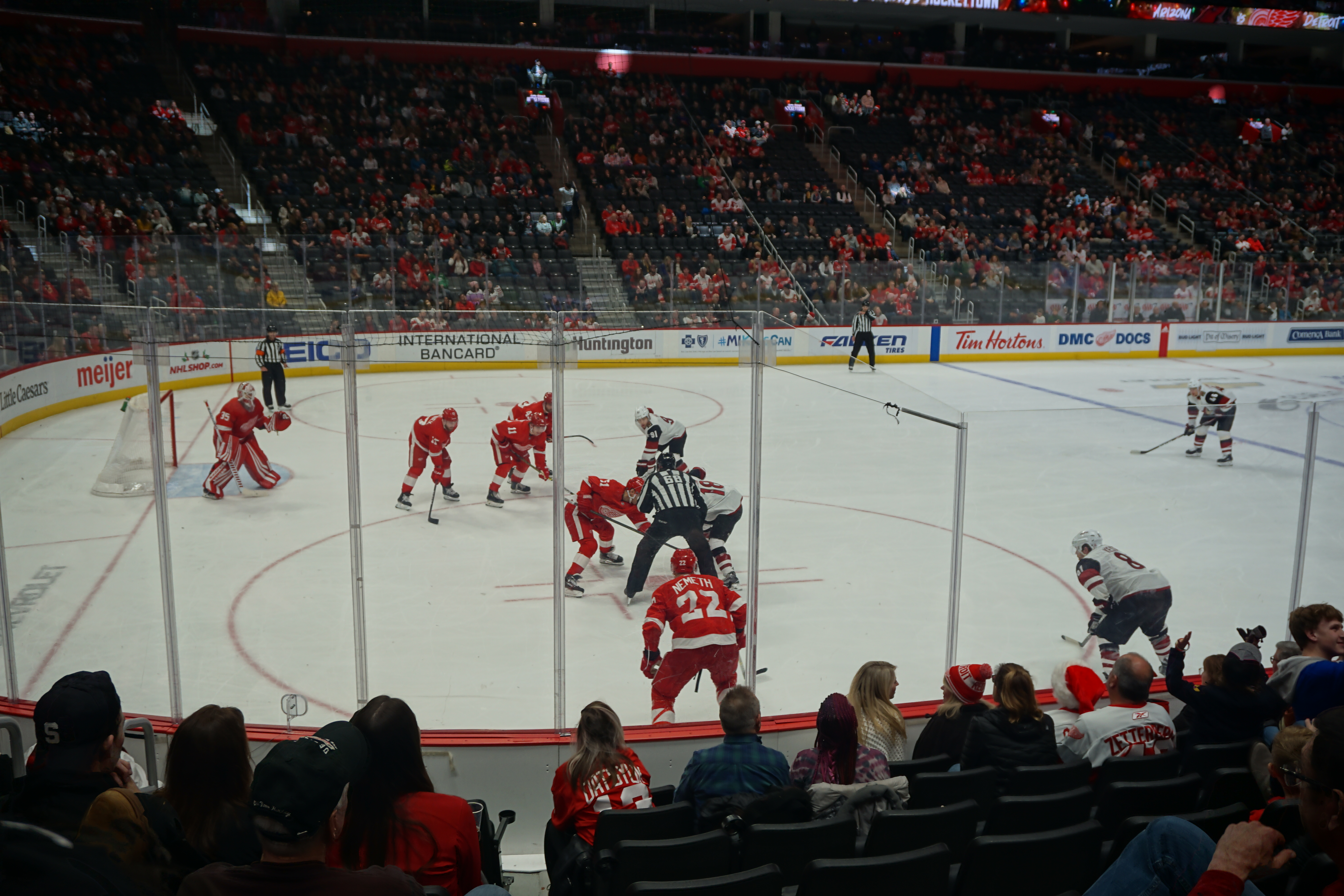
Filppula prepares to take a face-off in December 2019

=== New York Islanders (2018–2019) ===
On 1 July 2018, Filppula signed a one-year $2.75 million contract with the New York Islanders. In the 2018–19 season, Filppula proved his versatility with the Islanders, used in all forward positions in posting 17 goals and 14 assists for 33 points in 72 games for the playoff-bound club. In the post-season, Filppula helped the Islanders advance to the second round collecting four assists in 8 games.

=== Return to Detroit (2019–2021) ===
On 1 July 2019, Filppula signed a two-year, $6 million contract with the Red Wings. On 1 February 2020, Filppula appeared in his 1,000th career NHL game, becoming the eighth Finnish-born player to reach the milestone.

=== Genève-Servette HC (2021–2024) ===
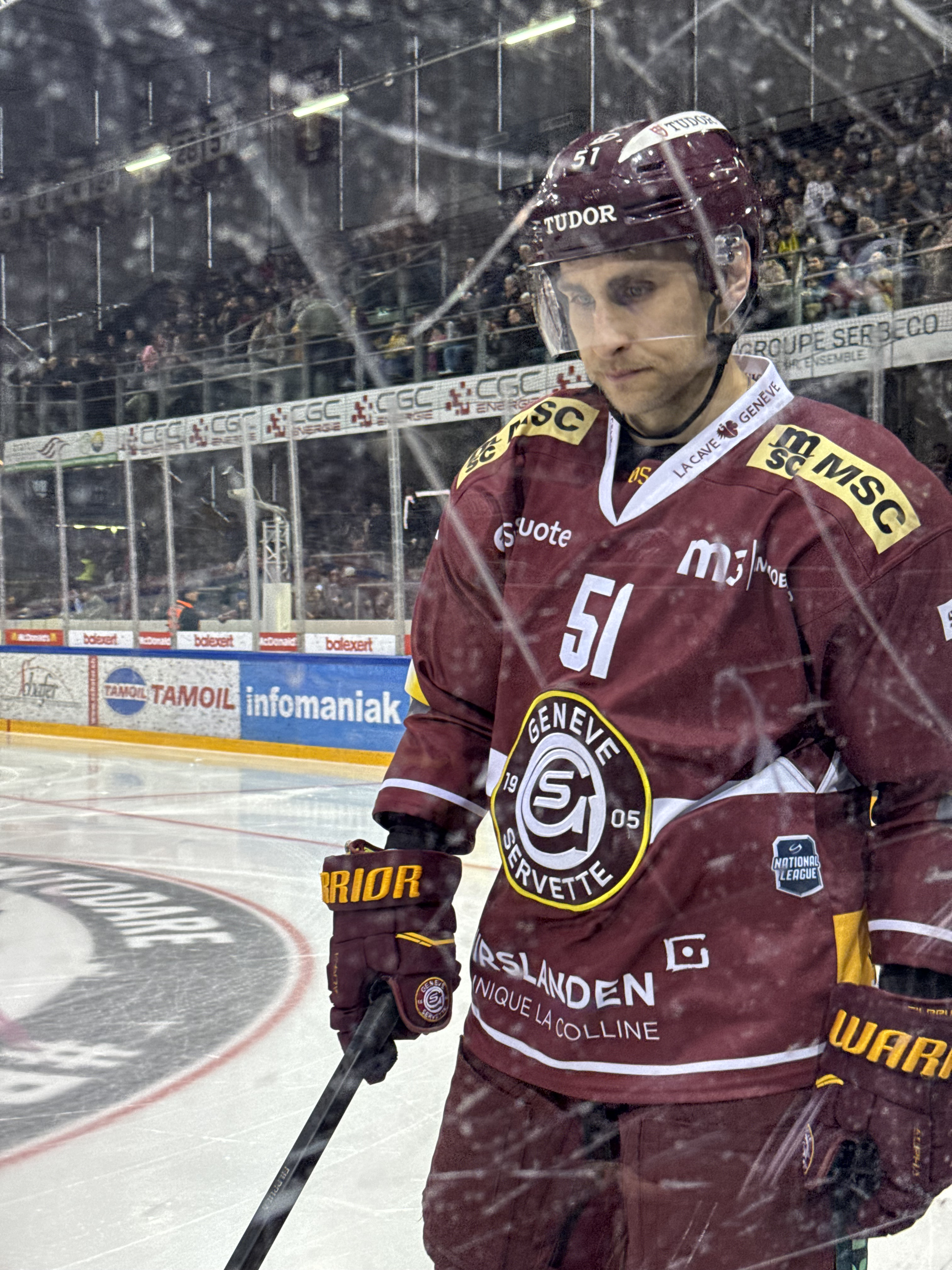
Filppula with GSHC

On 24 August 2021, Filppula joined Genève-Servette HC of the National League (NL) on a one-year deal for the 2021–22 season. Flippula won the 2023 National League Championship with the team.

=== Return to Jokerit (2024–2025) ===
In August 2024, Filppula returned to Jokerit with a one-year contract. At the same time, he became one of the owners of the club and announced that he would receive no salary for the season. Filppula was also named the team captain.

On 31 March 2025, Filppula and Jokerit were crowned champions of the 2024-25 Mestis season in the second tier of the Finnish hockey league. One month later, on 29 April, the 41-year-old forward announced his retirement from hockey.

On 10 January 2026, Filppula's number 51 was retired by his last club Jokerit.

== International play ==
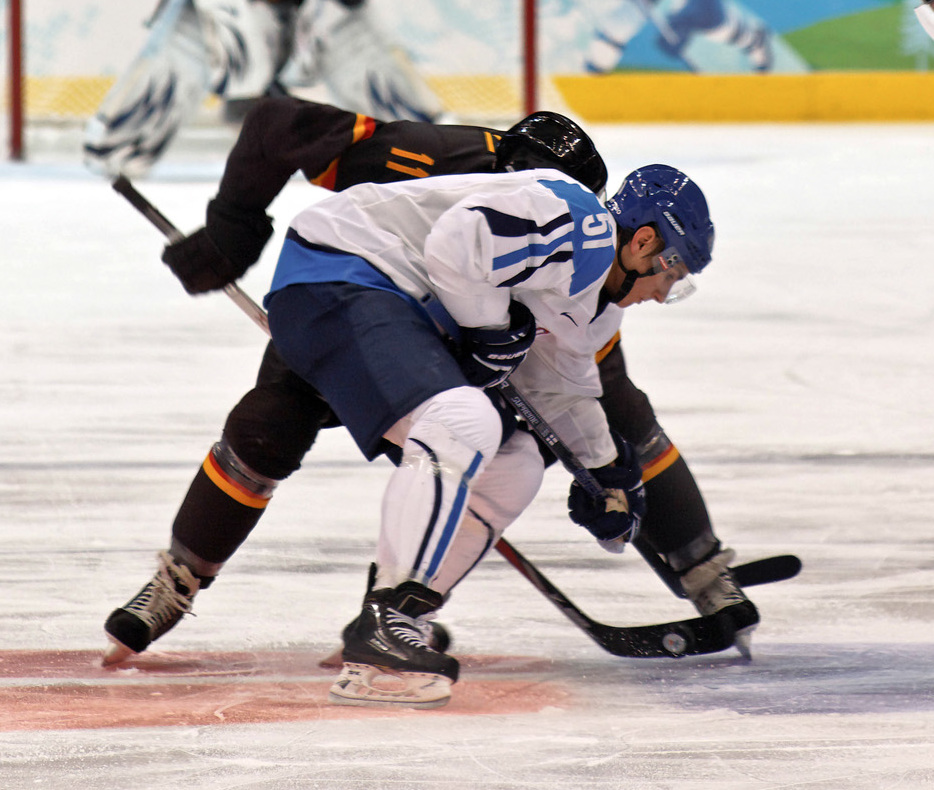
- Filppula (number 51) battling for faceoff against Germany at the 2010 Winter Olympics

Medal record

Representing Finland

Ice hockey

Olympic Games
Gold medal – first place	2022 Beijing	
Bronze medal – third place	2010 Vancouver	

World Championships
Gold medal – first place	2022 Finland	

World Junior Championships
Bronze medal – third place	2003 Canada	
Bronze medal – third place	2004 Finland	

Filppula was named captain of Finland at the World under-18 Championships in Slovakia in 2002. At the 2004 World Junior Ice Hockey Championships, he scored four goals and five assists in seven games to be selected as a tournament all-star. He was selected to play for Finland at the 2010 Winter Olympics, which eventually resulted in a bronze medal win over Slovakia. He scored the empty net goal in the 5–3 win.

On 7 January 2014, Filppula was named to the team Finland roster for the 2014 Winter Olympics in Sochi. On 6 February 2014, Filppula suffered an ankle injury in Tampa Bay's 4–1 loss to the Toronto Maple Leafs. The injury was diagnosed as a non-displaced fracture and he was expected to miss at least three weeks, forcing him to miss the Olympics.

On 2 March 2016, Finland named Filppula to its 2016 World Cup of Hockey roster. He scored Finland's only goal of the tournament in the game against North America.

Filppula served as captain of the gold medal-winning 2022 Finnish Olympic team and the gold medal-winning 2022 IIHF World Championship team. He was also honored as a flag bearer for the Parade of Nations at the Olympic opening ceremony.

With his wins in 2022, Filppula became the first Finnish player and 30th overall to enter the Triple Gold Club.

== Personal life ==
Filppula is the younger brother of Ilari Filppula. He has wife Jordan and daughter Vera

== Career statistics ==
=== Regular season and playoffs ===
			Regular season					Playoffs
Season	Team	League	GP	G	A	Pts	PIM	GP	G	A	Pts	PIM
2000–01	Jokerit	FIN U18	31	18	29	47	4	6	4	4	8	0
2000–01	Jokerit	FIN U20	1	0	1	1	0	—	—	—	—	—
2001–02	Jokerit	FIN U18	1	0	1	1	0	8	4	9	13	2
2001–02	Jokerit	FIN U20	40	8	15	23	14	1	0	0	0	0
2002–03	Jokerit	FIN U20	35	16	37	53	14	11	4	10	14	4
2003–04	Jokerit	SM-l	49	5	13	18	6	—	—	—	—	—
2004–05	Jokerit	SM-l	55	10	20	30	20	12	5	6	11	2
2005–06	Grand Rapids Griffins	AHL	74	20	50	70	30	16	7	9	16	4
2005–06	Detroit Red Wings	NHL	4	0	1	1	2	—	—	—	—	—
2006–07	Detroit Red Wings	NHL	73	10	7	17	20	18	3	2	5	2
2006–07	Grand Rapids Griffins	AHL	3	2	2	4	2	—	—	—	—	—
2007–08	Detroit Red Wings	NHL	78	19	17	36	28	22	5	6	11	2
2008–09	Detroit Red Wings	NHL	80	12	28	40	42	23	3	13	16	8
2009–10	Detroit Red Wings	NHL	55	11	24	35	24	12	4	5	9	6
2010–11	Detroit Red Wings	NHL	71	16	23	39	22	11	2	6	8	6
2011–12	Detroit Red Wings	NHL	81	23	43	66	14	5	0	2	2	2
2012–13	Jokerit	SM-l	16	6	9	15	6	—	—	—	—	—
2012–13	Detroit Red Wings	NHL	41	9	8	17	6	14	2	4	6	4
2013–14	Tampa Bay Lightning	NHL	75	25	33	58	20	4	0	1	1	0
2014–15	Tampa Bay Lightning	NHL	82	12	36	48	24	26	4	10	14	4
2015–16	Tampa Bay Lightning	NHL	76	8	23	31	46	17	1	6	7	0
2016–17	Tampa Bay Lightning	NHL	59	7	27	34	24	—	—	—	—	—
2016–17	Philadelphia Flyers	NHL	20	5	3	8	2	—	—	—	—	—
2017–18	Philadelphia Flyers	NHL	81	11	22	33	20	6	1	2	3	2
2018–19	New York Islanders	NHL	72	17	14	31	16	8	0	4	4	2
2019–20	Detroit Red Wings	NHL	70	6	15	21	24	—	—	—	—	—
2020–21	Detroit Red Wings	NHL	38	6	9	15	12	—	—	—	—	—
2021–22	Genève–Servette HC	NL	48	19	28	47	10	2	0	1	1	0
2022–23	Genève–Servette HC	NL	46	17	34	51	62	18	1	12	13	10
2023–24	Genève–Servette HC	NL	51	11	22	33	22	2	0	1	1	2
2024–25	Jokerit	Mestis	39	14	27	41	24	13	8	6	14	8
NHL totals			1,056	197	333	530	346	166	25	61	86	38

=== International ===
Year	Team	Event	Result	GP	G	A	Pts	PIM
2002	Finland	WJC18	4th	8	4	6	10	2
2003	Finland	WJC	3rd place, bronze medalist(s)	6	0	1	1	2
2004	Finland	WJC	3rd place, bronze medalist(s)	7	4	5	9	2
2010	Finland	OG	3rd place, bronze medalist(s)	6	3	0	3	0
2012	Finland	WC	4th	10	4	6	10	6
2016	Finland	WCH	8th	3	1	0	1	0
2017	Finland	WC	4th	10	2	3	5	12
2022	Finland	OG	1st place, gold medalist(s)	6	0	2	2	0
2022	Finland	WC	1st place, gold medalist(s)	10	3	2	5	2
Junior totals				21	8	12	20	6
Senior totals				35	10	11	21	18

== Awards and honors ==
Award	Year
Finnish Ice Hockey Association
Kari Jalonen Award	2003
President's trophy	2022
AHL
All-Star Game	2006
NHL
Stanley Cup champion	2008
NL
Champion	2023
CHL
Champion	2024
Mestis
Champion	2025

Olympic Games
Preceded by Janne Ahonen	Flagbearer for Finland; Beijing 2022	Succeeded by TBD
