= Nikolai Belov (ice hockey) =

Russian ice hockey player (born 1987)

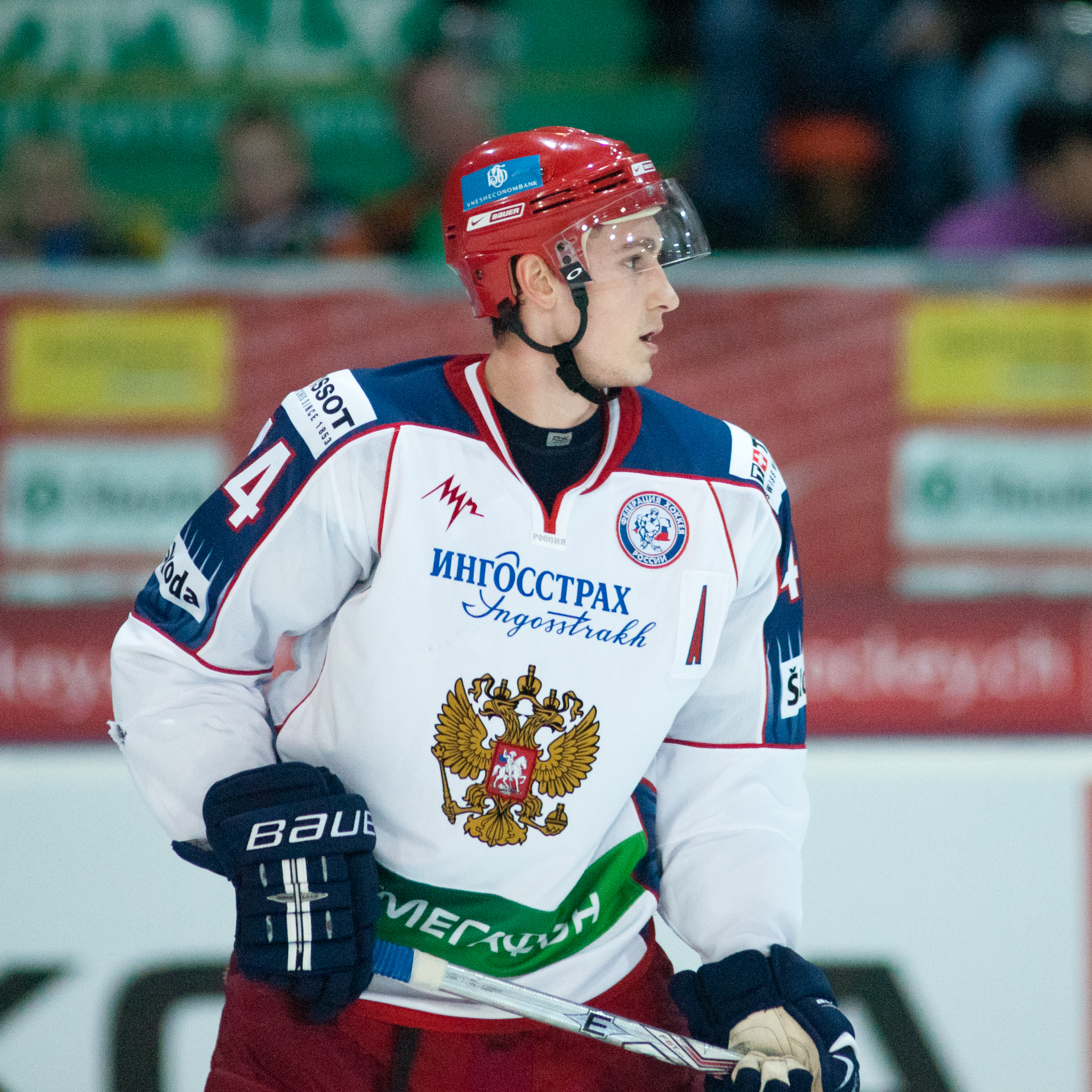
- Born: August 13, 1987 (age 37); Moscow, Russian SFSR
- Height: 6 ft 2 in (188 cm)
- Weight: 163 lb (74 kg; 11 st 9 lb)
- Position: Defence
- Current team Former teams: IF Björklöven; Almtuna IS; MODO Hockey; Dynamo Moscow; Neftekhimik Nizhnekamsk; Ak Bars Kazan; SKA Saint Petersburg; Traktor Chelyabinsk
- National team: Russia
- Playing career: 2005–present

Nikolai Sergeyevich Belov (born August 13, 1987) is a Russian professional ice hockey defenceman who currently plays for IF Björklöven in HockeyAllsvenskan, the second highest league of ice hockey in Sweden. He has previously played in the top Russian leagues with Dynamo Moscow, Neftekhimik Nizhnekamsk, Ak Bars Kazan, SKA Saint Petersburg and Traktor Chelyabinsk.

In the 2014–15 season, Belov was traded by Neftekhimik Nizhnekamsk, along with a first-round pick, to SKA Saint Petersburg in exchange for Evgeny Ryasensky, Alexei Grishin and Mikhail Tikhonov on November 24, 2014.

On February 12, 2021, Belov was bought out from his contract at Almtuna IS by league rival IF Björklöven.

== Career statistics ==
=== International ===
Year	Team	Event	Result	GP	G	A	Pts	PIM
2011	Russia	WC	4th	6	0	0	0	4
Senior totals				6	0	0	0	4
