= Alexei Grishin (ice hockey) =

Russian ice hockey player

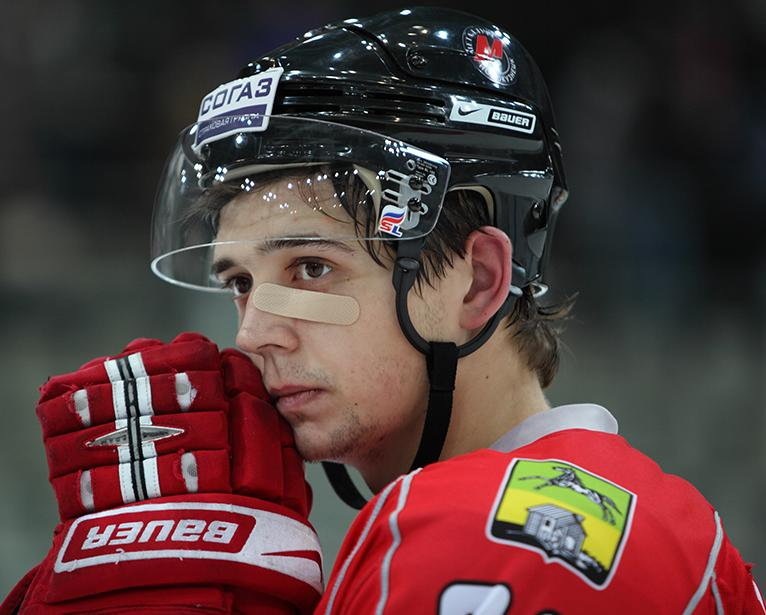
- Grishin in 2012
- Born: September 28, 1988 (age 37) Chekhov, Russia
- Height: 6 ft 4 in (193 cm)
- Weight: 205 lb (93 kg; 14 st 9 lb)
- Position: Defence
- Shoots: Left
- VHL team Former teams: Yuzhny Ural Orsk; HC Vityaz; Metallurg Novokuznetsk; Salavat Yulaev Ufa; Spartak Moscow; SKA Saint Petersburg
- Playing career: 2006–present

Alexei Igorevich Grishin (Russian: Алексей Игоревич Гришин; born September 28, 1988) is a Russian professional ice hockey defenceman. He is currently playing with Yuzhny Ural Orsk of the Supreme Hockey League (VHL).

== Playing career ==
Grishin made his Kontinental Hockey League (KHL) debut playing with HC Vityaz during the 2008–09 KHL season.

In the 2014–15 season, Grishin was traded for the second time within a month by SKA Saint Petersburg, along with Evgeny Ryasensky and Mikhail Tikhonov, to Neftekhimik Nizhnekamsk in exchange for Nikolai Belov and a first-round pick on November 24, 2014.
