= Oksana Grishina =

Oksana Grishina may refer to:

- Oksana Grishina (cyclist) (born 1968), Russian Olympic track cyclist
- Oksana Grishina (fitness pro) (born 1978), Russian former gymnast and current professional fitness competitor
