= Evgeny Ryasensky =

Russian ice hockey player

- Born: March 6, 1987 (age 38) Tver, Russian SFSR, Soviet Union
- Height: 5 ft 11 in (180 cm)
- Weight: 209 lb (95 kg; 14 st 13 lb)
- Position: Defence
- Shoots: Left
- KHL team Former teams: Free Agent; Ak Bars Kazan; Neftekhimik Nizhnekamsk; CSKA Moscow; SKA Saint Petersburg; Traktor Chelyabinsk
- National team: Russia
- Playing career: 2005–present

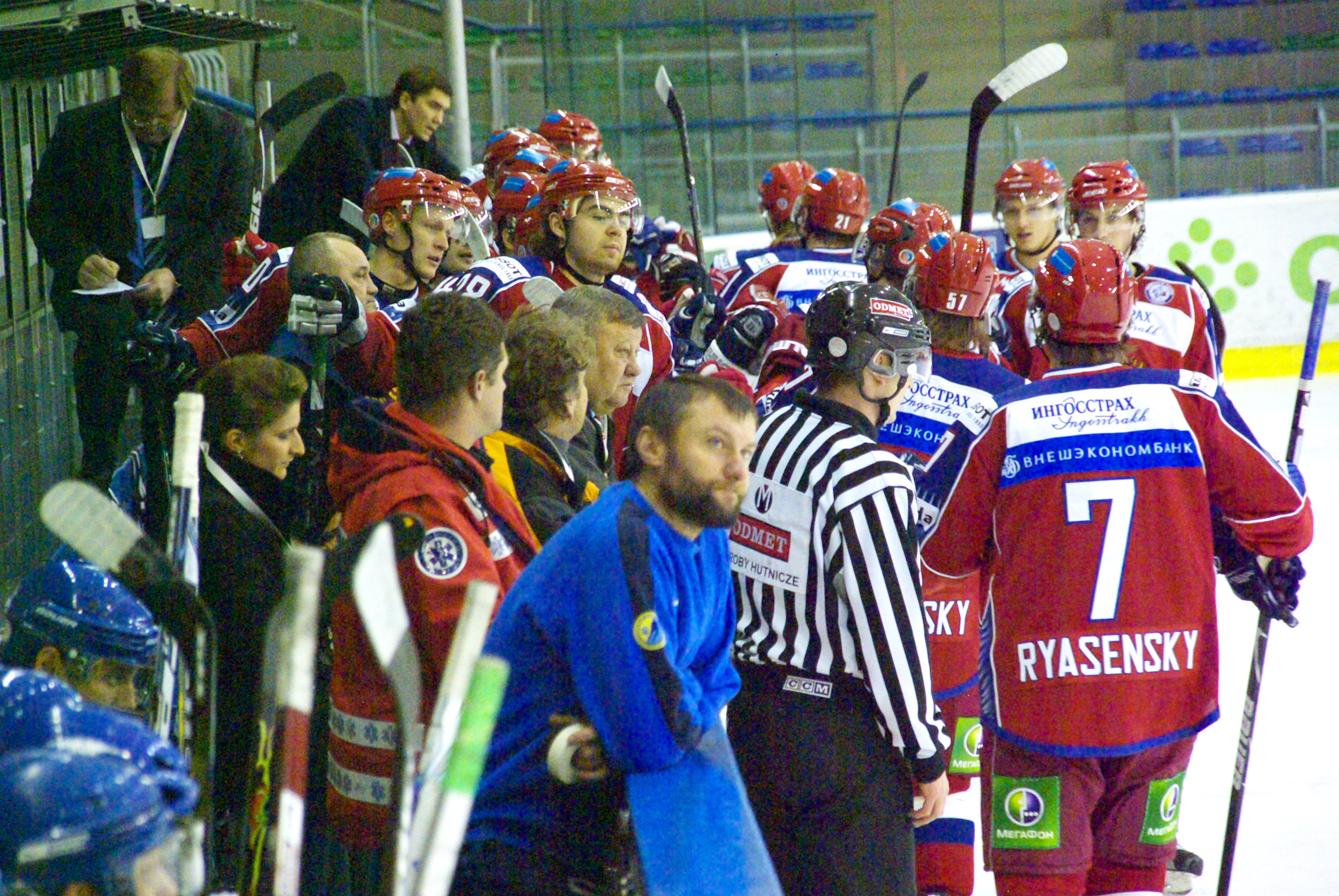
Ukraine - Russia B, 11 November 2010 (Sanok)d.jpg

Evgeny Alexandrovich Ryasensky (Russian: Евгений Александрович Рясенский; born July 18, 1987), or Yevgeni Ryasenski, is a Russian professional ice hockey defenceman who is an unrestricted free agent. He most recently played for Neftekhimik Nizhnekamsk of the Kontinental Hockey League (KHL).

== Playing career ==
Ryasensky made his senior debut in the Russian Superleague with Ak Bars Kazan before transferring to Neftekhimik Nizhnekamsk for the inaugural season of the KHL in 2008-09 season. Over the next six seasons Ryasensky spent time also with HC CSKA Moscow and SKA Saint Petersburg.

In the 2014–15 season, Ryasensky was traded by SKA Saint Petersburg along with Alexei Grishin and Mikhail Tikhonov in a return to Neftekhimik Nizhnekamsk in exchange for Nikolai Belov and a first-round pick on November 24, 2014. On November 24, 2015 on the initiative of the player, the club terminated the contract.

On December 21, 2015, Ryasensky signed a contract in a return with Neftekhimik Nizhnekamsk before the end of the season.

After three further seasons with Neftekhimik, Ryasensky left as a free agent to join his fifth KHL club, Traktor Chelyabinsk, on September 25, 2017.

== Career statistics ==
=== International ===
Year	Team	Event	Result	GP	G	A	Pts	PIM
2007	Russia	WJC	2nd place, silver medalist(s)	6	1	3	4	6
2012	Russia	WC	1st place, gold medalist(s)	7	0	1	1	0
Junior totals				6	1	3	4	6
Senior totals				7	0	1	1	0
