= Grishina, Perm Krai =

Grishina Гришина
- Village
- Location within Perm Krai Location within Russia
- Coordinates: 60°05′N 57°28′E
- Country: Russia
- Region: Perm Krai
- District: Krasnovishersky District
- Time zone: UTC+5:00

Grishina (Russian: Гришина) is a rural locality (a village) in Krasnovishersky District, Perm Krai, Russia. The population was 16 as of 2010. There are 2 streets.

== Geography ==
Grishina is located 48 km southeast of Krasnovishersk (the district's administrative centre) by road. Verkh-Yazva is the nearest rural locality.
