= Ondřej Pavelec =

Czech ice hockey player (born 1987)

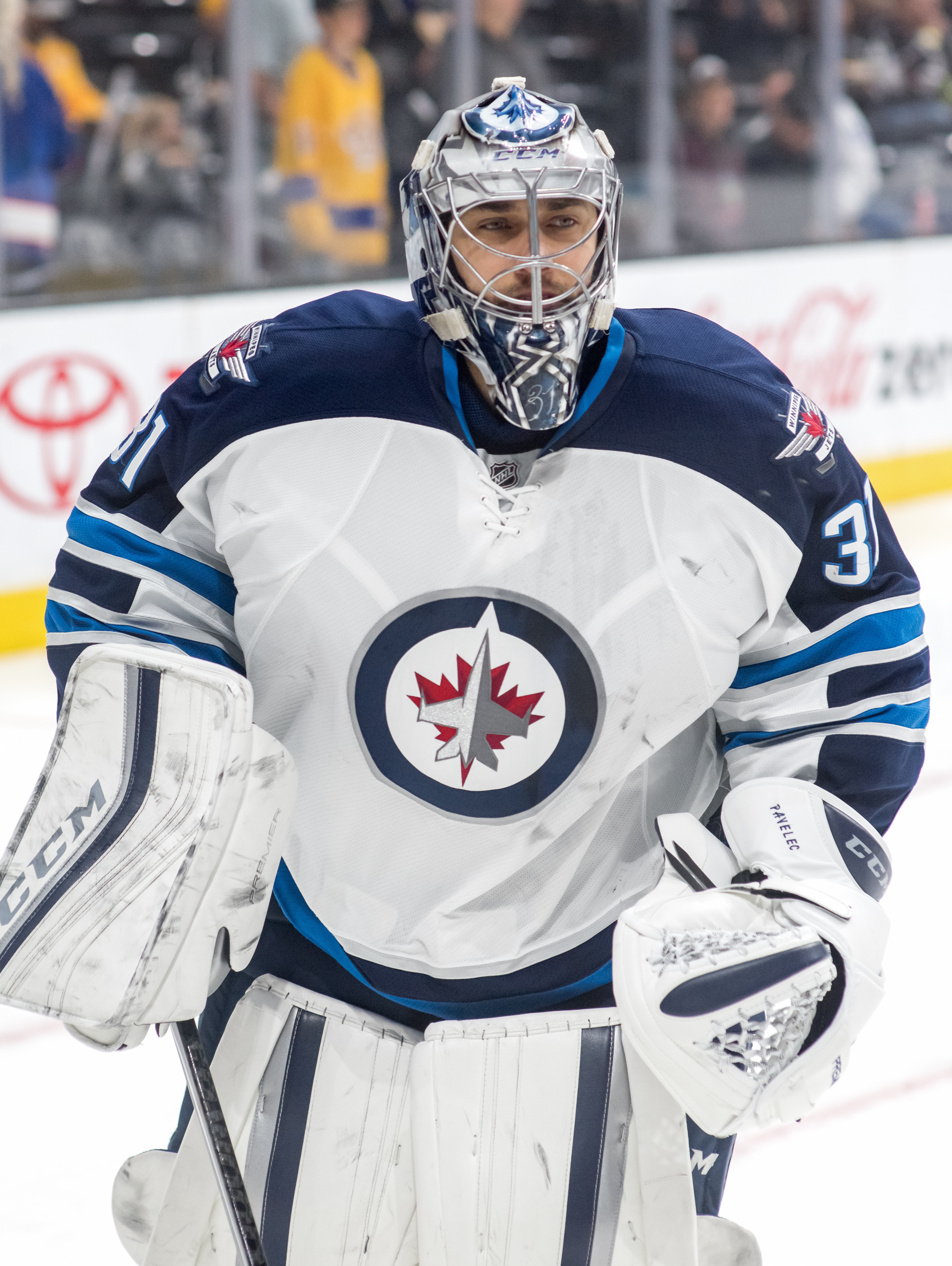
- Pavelec with the Winnipeg Jets in 2016
- Born: 31 August 1987 (age 39) Kladno, Czechoslovakia
- Height: 6 ft 3 in (191 cm)
- Weight: 215 lb (98 kg; 15 st 5 lb)
- Position: Goaltender
- Caught: Left
- Played for: Atlanta Thrashers; Winnipeg Jets; Bílí Tygři Liberec; Lahti Pelicans; New York Rangers
- National team: Czech Republic
- NHL draft: 41st overall, 2005; Atlanta Thrashers
- Playing career: 2007–2018
Medal record
Men's ice hockey
Representing Czech Republic
World Championships
Gold medal – first place	2010 Cologne
Bronze medal – third place	2011 Bratislava

Ondřej Pavelec (Czech: [ˈondr̝ej ˈpavɛlɛts]; born 31 August 1987) is a Czech former professional ice hockey goaltender. Drafted in the second round, 41st overall, by the Atlanta Thrashers in 2005, he stayed with the team as they became the Winnipeg Jets in 2011, and played his final season with the New York Rangers. During the 2012–13 NHL lockout, Pavelec played for Bílí Tygři Liberec of the Czech Extraliga (ELH) and Pelicans of the Finnish SM-liiga.

== Playing career ==
=== Junior ===
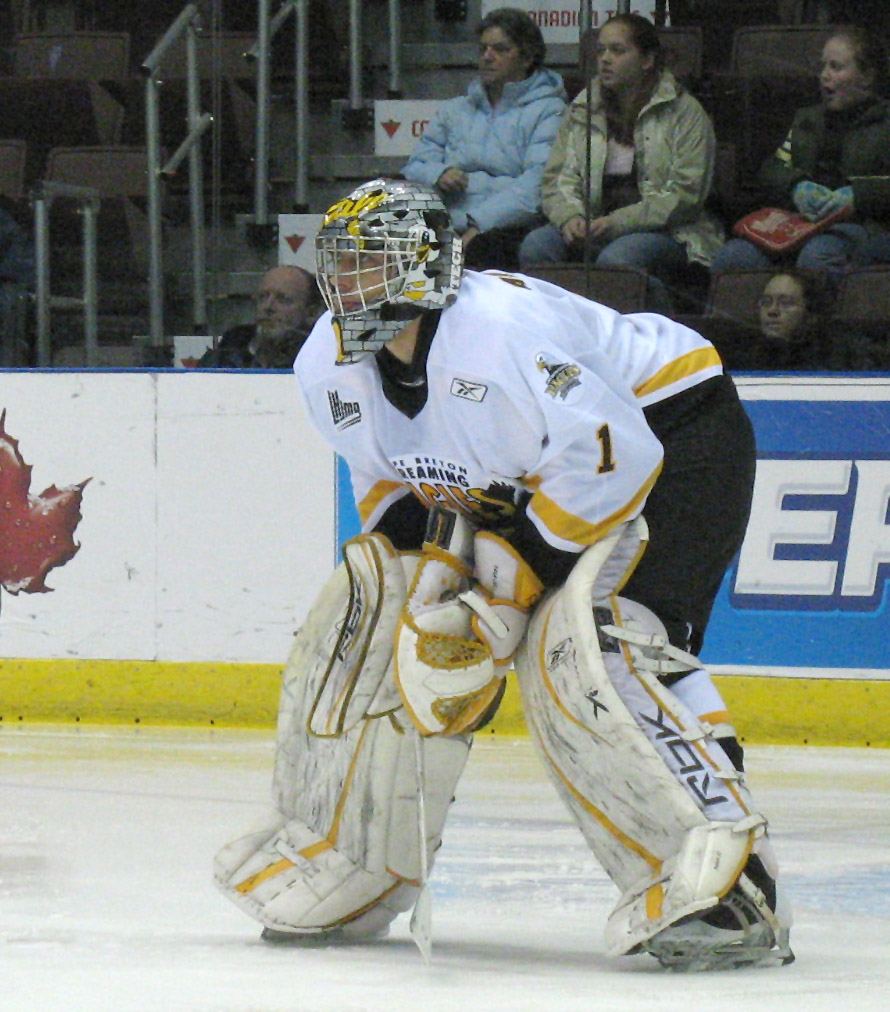
Pavelec playing with the 2006–07 Cape Breton Screaming Eagles

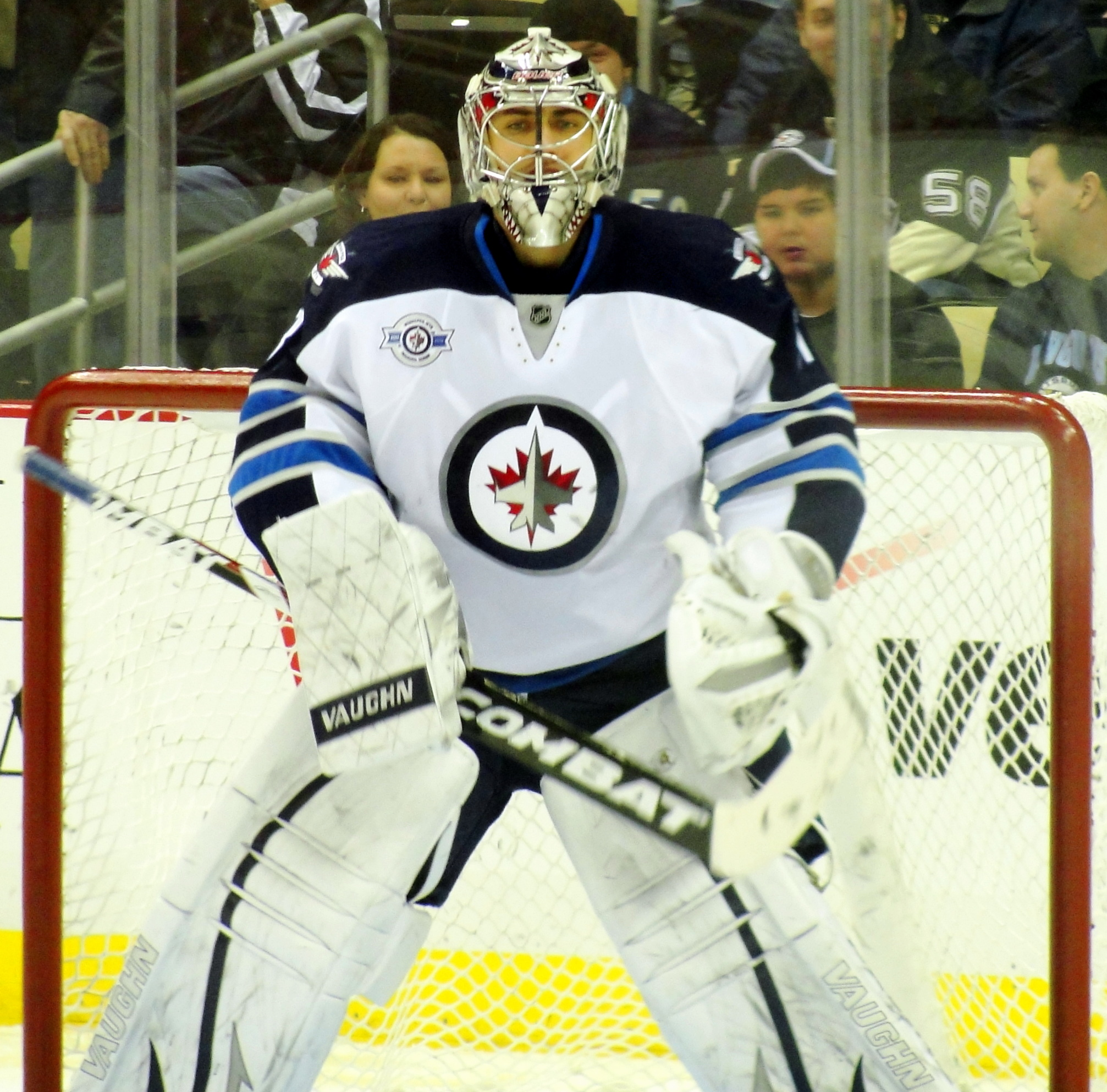
Pavelec during the 2011–12 season

Pavelec was drafted in the first round of the 2005 CHL Import Draft by the Cape Breton Screaming Eagles of the Quebec Major Junior Hockey League (QMJHL). He was also drafted by the NHL's Atlanta Thrashers in the second round, 41st overall, at the 2005 NHL entry draft. He played two seasons with the Screaming Eagles and helped them to a semi-final finish in the 2006–07 season.

Pavelec was a First Team All-Star in each of his two seasons with Cape Breton, and won the Jacques Plante Memorial Trophy for best goals against average (GAA) in both years, making him only the fourth player to repeat as Jacques Plante Trophy winner and the first in 20 years to do so (Robert Desjardins was the last). As a rookie, took home the Raymond Lagacé Trophy and RDS Trophy, awarded to top defensive rookie and rookie of the year, respectively. His numbers were remarkably consistent over the two seasons, as he recorded GAAs of 2.51 in 2005–06 and 2.52 in 2006–07, with save percentages of .929 and .908, respectively.

=== Professional ===
Pavelec signed a professional contract with the Atlanta Thrashers in 2007, joining their American Hockey League (AHL) affiliate, the Chicago Wolves. On 18 May 2007, Pavelec shut-out the Toronto Marlies 5–0 in the AHL's Western Conference Finals. Pavelec helped Wolves win the Calder Cup in the 2007–08 season.

After starting nine games for Chicago in the 2008–09 season, Pavelec was recalled to the NHL after Thrashers starter Kari Lehtonen suffered an injury. Pavelec played his first NHL game on 20 October 2007, then made his first NHL start, and recorded his first NHL win, against the Tampa Bay Lightning on 3 November 2007. He was playing with Atlanta since being called up on 1 November 2008, until he was reassigned to the Wolves on 19 December 2008. He later returned to the Thrashers.

On 8 October 2010, Pavelec collapsed and lost consciousness during a game against the Washington Capitals while there was a break in play at 2:25 into the first period. He was taken off the ice on a stretcher and taken to the hospital. He regained consciousness while at the hospital and was in stable condition, and apparently was concerned about the score in the game, which the Thrashers won 4–2. It was determined after testing by doctors that the cause of his collapse was neurocardiogenic syncope, a type of fainting spell, and that he received a concussion and lost consciousness after his head hit the ice. He was released from the hospital on 11 October 2010. He would return to the ice in a 3–4 shootout loss to the St Louis Blues on 30 October 2010.

On June 25, 2012, Pavelec, who was a restricted free agent, signed a five-year contract extension with the Jets for 19.5 million dollars.

Due to the 2012–13 NHL lockout, Pavelec returned to his native Czech Republic, where he was expected to join HC Oceláři Třinec. However, he signed with Bílí Tygři Liberec instead, where he joined fellow NHLer Ladislav Šmíd. During the 2014–15 season, Pavelec set a Winnipeg Jets franchise record by recording three shutouts in a row, going 187:05 without allowing a goal. He was instrumental in helping the team qualify for their first ever Stanley Cup playoffs since the franchise relocated from Atlanta to Winnipeg in 2011.

Pavelec was placed on waivers by the Jets on 10 October 2016 and was subsequently sent down to the Manitoba Moose of the AHL. The Jets recalled Pavelec on 17 January 2017, and he played his first game of the 2016–17 season on 18 January 2017. Shortly following his debut, Pavelec set a franchise record for most saves in a period after he made 25 saves in the second period to lead the team to a 5–3 win over the St. Louis Blues.

On 1 July 2017, having left the Thrashers/Jets as a free agent after ten professional seasons with the franchise, Pavelec signed a one-year, $1.3 million contract with the New York Rangers.

On 20 September 2018, Pavelec announced his retirement after an 11-year career.

== International play ==
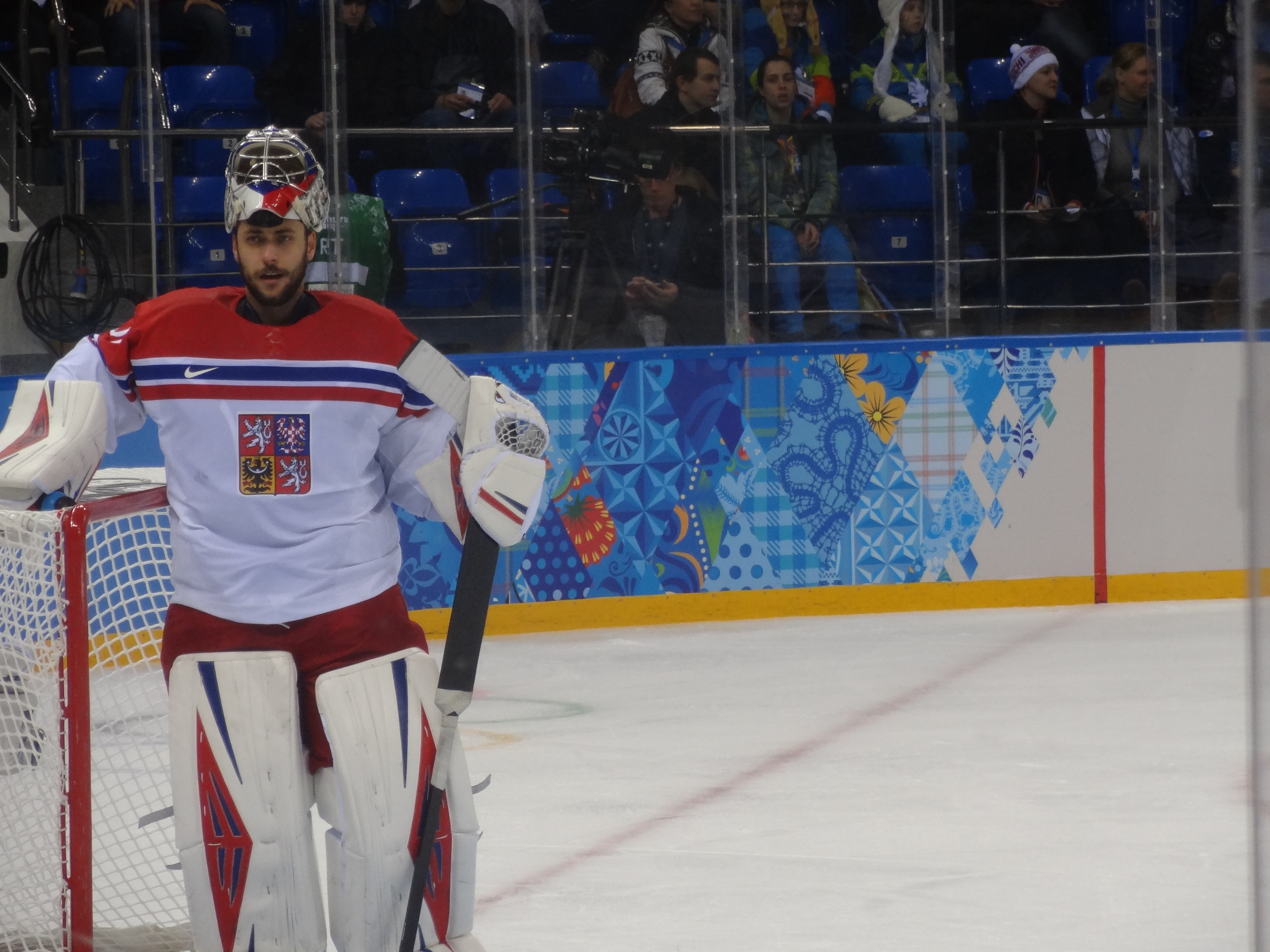
Pavelec at the 2014 Winter Olympics

Pavelec led the Czech Republic under-17 team to a second-place finish in the 2004 Junior World Cup, and the under-18 squad to a fourth-place finish at the U-18 World Junior Cup. He was also the starting goalie for the Czech Republic junior team at the 2006 World Junior Ice Hockey Championships in Vancouver, Kelowna and Kamloops, British Columbia.

Pavelec then played for the senior Czech team at the 2010 World Championships, helping capture a gold medal. He also competed in the 2010 and 2014 Winter Olympics in Vancouver and Sochi, respectively. In between the two Olympic tournaments, he helped lead the Czechs to a bronze medal at the 2011 World Championships.

== Career statistics ==
=== Regular season and playoffs ===
			Regular season									Playoffs
Season	Team	League	GP	W	L	OTL	MIN	GA	SO	GAA	SV%	GP	W	L	MIN	GA	SO	GAA	SV%
2002–03	HC Vagnerplast Kladno	CZE U18	7	—	—	—	—	—	—	2.21	.911	2	—	—	—	—	—	2.77	.921
2003–04	HC Rabat Kladno	CZE U18	38	—	—	—	2079	77	3	2.22	.922	2	—	—	—	—	—	6.27	.696
2004–05	HC Rabat Kladno	CZE U20	39	—	—	—	2218	85	7	2.30	.930	10	—	—	—	—	—	2.45	.920
2004–05	HK Lev Slaný	CZE.3	1	—	—	—	60	4	0	4.00	—	—	—	—	—	—	—	—	—
2005–06	Cape Breton Screaming Eagles	QMJHL	47	28	17	2	2578	108	3	2.51	.929	9	4	5	506	19	0	2.25	.926
2006–07	Cape Breton Screaming Eagles	QMJHL	43	28	11	0	2335	98	1	2.52	.908	16	11	5	970	37	2	2.29	.920
2007–08	Chicago Wolves	AHL	52	33	16	3	3033	140	2	2.77	.911	24	16	8	1438	56	2	2.34	.921
2007–08	Atlanta Thrashers	NHL	7	3	3	0	347	18	0	3.11	.905	—	—	—	—	—	—	—	—
2008–09	Chicago Wolves	AHL	40	18	20	2	2417	104	3	2.58	.914	—	—	—	—	—	—	—	—
2008–09	Atlanta Thrashers	NHL	12	3	7	0	599	36	0	3.61	.880	—	—	—	—	—	—	—	—
2009–10	Atlanta Thrashers	NHL	42	14	18	7	2317	127	2	3.29	.906	—	—	—	—	—	—	—	—
2010–11	Atlanta Thrashers	NHL	58	21	23	9	3225	147	4	2.73	.914	—	—	—	—	—	—	—	—
2010–11	Chicago Wolves	AHL	1	0	1	0	58	3	0	3.10	.864	—	—	—	—	—	—	—	—
2011–12	Winnipeg Jets	NHL	69	29	28	9	3932	191	4	2.91	.906	—	—	—	—	—	—	—	—
2012–13	Bílí Tygři Liberec	ELH	14	4	10	0	772	45	0	3.50	.896	—	—	—	—	—	—	—	—
2012–13	Lahti Pelicans	SM-l	6	—	—	—	—	—	—	2.68	.912	—	—	—	—	—	—	—	—
2012–13	Winnipeg Jets	NHL	44	21	20	3	2553	119	0	2.80	.905	—	—	—	—	—	—	—	—
2013–14	Winnipeg Jets	NHL	57	22	26	7	3248	163	1	3.01	.901	—	—	—	—	—	—	—	—
2014–15	Winnipeg Jets	NHL	50	22	16	8	2838	108	5	2.28	.920	4	0	4	241	15	0	3.73	.891
2015–16	Winnipeg Jets	NHL	33	13	13	4	1900	88	1	2.78	.904	—	—	—	—	—	—	—	—
2016–17	Manitoba Moose	AHL	18	8	7	2	1059	49	0	2.78	.917	—	—	—	—	—	—	—	—
2016–17	Winnipeg Jets	NHL	8	4	4	0	442	26	0	3.55	.888	—	—	—	—	—	—	—	—
2017–18	New York Rangers	NHL	19	4	9	1	904	46	1	3.05	.910	—	—	—	—	—	—	—	—
NHL totals			398	156	167	48	22,303	1,069	18	2.88	.907	4	0	4	241	15	0	3.73	.891

=== International ===
Year	Team	Event	GP	W	L	T	MIN	GA	SO	GAA	SV%
2005	Czech Republic	WJC18	7	4	3	0	376	13	1	2.07	.932
2007	Czech Republic	WJC	5	2	3	0	275	15	0	3.28	.890
2010	Czech Republic	WC	1	0	1	0	59	3	0	3.05	.800
2011	Czech Republic	WC	8	7	1	0	479	15	2	1.88	.939
2013	Czech Republic	WC	5	3	2	0	297	7	0	1.42	.938
2014	Czech Republic	OG	4	2	2	0	209	10	0	2.87	.889
2015	Czech Republic	WC	9	6	3	0	517	17	1	1.97	.912
Senior totals			27	18	9	0	1561	52	3	2.00	.920

== Awards and achievements ==
- Jacques Plante Memorial Trophy (QMJHL's lowest GAA) – 2006, 2007
- Raymond Lagacé Trophy (QMJHL's defensive rookie of the year) – 2006
- RDS Cup (QMJHL's rookie of the year) – 2006
- QMJHL First All-Star Team – 2006, 2007
- QMJHL All-Rookie Team – 2006
- AHL Calder Cup – 2007–2008 Chicago Wolves
