= 2024–25 Mestis season =

- League: Mestis
- Sport: Ice hockey
- Defending champions: IPK (2023–24)
- Duration: September 2024 – April 2025
- Games: 49
- Teams: 10
- TV partner: MTV

Regular Season
- Best record: Jokerit
- Runners-up: IPK
- Promoted to Liiga: No one
- Relegated to Suomi-sarja: Hokki (bankrupt)

Playoffs
- Champions: Jokerit
- Runners-up: IPK

Mestis seasons
- ← 2023–24 2025–26 →

The 2024–25 Mestis season was the 25th season of Mestis, the second level of ice hockey in Finland. 10 teams participates in the league and each will play 49 games during the regular season.

The regular season is followed by playoffs, promotion and relegation series. The winner of the playoffs will be declared the Champion of Mestis and will participate in the promotion series to Liiga. Those teams finishing ninth and tenth will play a series to avoid relegation to Suomi-Sarja.

== Clubs ==
Updated 16 September 2024.

Team	City	Home arena, capacity	Founded	Head coach
Hermes	Kokkola	Kokkolan jäähalli, 4,200	1953	(Finland) ~~Simo Liukka~~ 27.10.2024 (Finland) Juha-Matti Kemppainen
Hokki	Kajaani	Kajaanin jäähalli, 2,372	1968	(Finland) Antti Halonen
IPK	Iisalmi	Kankaan jäähalli, -	1966	(Finland) ~~Simo Karjalainen~~ 25.2.2025 (Finland) Toni Ruotsalainen
Jokerit	Helsinki	Helsinki Ice Hall, 8,200	1967	(Finland) ~~Tero Määttä~~ 16.9.2024 (Finland) Risto Dufva
JoKP	Joensuu	Mehtimäki Ice Hall, 4,800	1953	(Finland) ~~Kasper Vuorinen~~ 9.2.2025 (Finland) Mikko Rämö
Ketterä	Imatra	Imatra Spa Areena, 1,300	1957	(Finland) Janne Tuunanen
KeuPa HT	Keuruu	Keuruun Jäähalli, 1,100	1995	(Finland) Niko Raiskio
Kiekko-Vantaa	Vantaa	Trio Areena, 3,700	1994	(Finland) Jani Manninen
RoKi	Rovaniemi	Lappi Areena, 3,500	1979	(Finland) ~~Sakari Salmela~~ 26.9.2024 (Finland) Mikko Sirento-Manninen
TUTO Hockey	Turku	Rajupaja Areena, 3,000	1929	(Finland) ~~Jonne Virtanen~~ 14.1.2025 (Finland) Samuli Marjeta

== Team changes ==
The following team changes have happened for the 2024–25 season:

=== To Mestis ===
Promoted from Suomi-sarja

- None

Relegated from Liiga

- None as Liiga is closed

=== From Mestis ===
Promoted to Liiga

- Kiekko-Espoo

Relegated to Suomi-sarja

- FPS

Other

- KOOVEE did not receive a license for the season and went bankrupt.

== Regular season ==
The regular season consists of 49 matches.

Pos	Team	Pld	W	OTW	OTL	L	GF	GA	GD	Pts	Final Result
1	Jokerit	49	32	7	3	7	178	72	+106	113	Advance to Quarterfinals
2	IPK	49	20	8	7	14	153	130	+23	83	Advance to Quarterfinals
3	Ketterä	49	20	9	3	17	145	125	+20	81	Advance to Quarterfinals
4	JoKP	49	19	2	11	17	130	147	−17	72	Advance to Quarterfinals
5	Hermes	49	22	1	4	22	135	164	−29	72	Advance to Quarterfinals
6	K-Vantaa	49	18	4	8	19	154	150	+4	70	Advance to Quarterfinals
7	RoKi	49	20	3	2	24	116	136	−20	68	Advance to Quarterfinals
8	TUTO Hockey (Note: TUTO Hockey deducted 6 points.)	49	19	4	6	20	147	142	+5	65	Advance to Quarterfinals
9	KeuPa HT	49	15	5	1	28	110	137	−27	56	Advance to Relegation series
10	Hokki	49	13	4	2	30	108	173	−65	49	Advance to Relegation series

Source: Mestis
Rules for classification: 1) Total points; 2) Goal difference; 3) Goals scored; 4) Head-to-head points; 5) Penalty minutes

== Playoffs ==
Playoffs are being played in three stages. Quarter-Finals is a best-of-5 series, with the semifinals and the finals being a best-of-7 series. The teams are reseeded after the first two stages, so that the best team by regular season performance to make the quarter-finals and the semifinals faces the worst team in the corresponding stage. The bronze medal will be decided in a single game.

=== Bracket ===
Quarter-finals (best-of-5)
1	Jokerit	3
8	TUTO Hockey	0
2	IPK	3
7	RoKi	1
3	Ketterä	2
6	K-Vantaa	3
4	JoKP	3
5	Hermes	1

Semi-finals (best-of-7)
1	Jokerit	4
4	K-Vantaa	1
2	IPK	4
3	JoKP	1

Finals (best-of-7)
1	Jokerit	4
2	IPK	1
Bronze game
3	JoKP	0
4	K-Vantaa	1

== Promotion ==
For the first time since the summer of 2013, the promotion playoffs will make a comeback. The Mestis champion will compete against the last-placed team of Liiga, with the winner of the best-of-7 series being promoted to Liiga and the loser being relegated to Mestis.

8 April	Pelicans	5-0	Jokerit	Isku Areena	Recap
Lars Bryggman (1) – 3:01; Joona Kumpula (1) – 14:56		First period	No scoring
Hampus Falk (1) – 3:25; Daniel Nieminen (1) – 11:20		Second period	No scoring
Ryan Lasch (1) – 15:00		Third period	No scoring
Patrik Bartošák (7 shots / 7 saves)		Goalie stats	Sisu Heikkeri (14 shots / 10 saves); Henri Risikko (8 shots / 7 saves)

10 April	Jokerit	4-3	2OT	Pelicans	Helsinki Ice Hall	Recap
Jesse Liuksiala (1) – 6:17; Antti Pihlström (1) – 7:42		First period		2:32 – Leevi Tukiainen (1; PS)
Jesse Liuksiala (2) – 3:49		Second period		No scoring
No scoring		Third period		17:01 – Elias Vilén (1; EA; PPG); 18:09 – Daniel Nieminen (2; EA)
Ville Vainikainen (1) – 10:50		Second overtime period		No scoring
Sisu Heikkeri (28 shots / 25 saves)		Goalie stats		Patrik Bartošák (22 shots / 18 saves)

12 April	Pelicans	2-0	Jokerit	Isku Areena	Recap
Daniel Nieminen (3) – 11:01		First period	No scoring
No scoring		Second period	No scoring
Leevi Tukiainen (2) – 0:15		Third period	No scoring
Patrik Bartošák (18 shots / 18 saves)		Goalie stats	Sisu Heikkeri (21 shots / 19 saves)

15 April	Jokerit	3-4	OT	Pelicans	Helsinki Ice Hall	Recap
Rony Ahonen (1) – 10:18		First period		16:54 – Joona Kumpula (2)
Teemu Suhonen (1; PPG) – 12:04; Valtteri Filppula (1) – 19:08		Second period		4:31 – Johannes Johannesen (1); 9:45 – Elias Vilén (2; PPG)
No scoring		Third period		No scoring
No scoring		First overtime period		2:54 – Miro Väänänen (1)
Sisu Heikkeri (29 shots / 25 saves)		Goalie stats		Patrik Bartošák (23 shots / 20 saves)

17 April	Pelicans	4–0	Jokerit	Isku Areena	Recap
Lars Bryggman (2) – 13:48		First period	No scoring
Antti Tyrväinen (1) – 0:31		Second period	No scoring
Elias Vilén (3; PPG) – 6:13; Konsta Hirvonen (1; SHG; ENG) – 18:21		Third period	No scoring
Patrik Bartošák (26 shots / 26 saves)		Goalie stats	Santeri Lipiäinen (21 shots / 18 saves)

Pelicans win series 4–1 and stays in Liiga

== Playout and Relegation series ==
The bottom two teams from the regular season will compete in a playout series, with the winner securing their spot in Mestis. The loser will then face the Suomi-sarja champion in a relegation series to determine who will play in Mestis next season

Both the playout and the relegation series are played as a best-of-7 series.

=== Bracket ===
Playout series			Relegation series
9	KeuPa HT	4
10	Hokki	1	1	Hokki *	0
			2	Pyry	4

* = 24.3.2025 Hokki declared bankruptcy. This means the 2nd round of relegation series will not be played and Pyry was declared the winner.
