= Sergei Grishin (footballer, born 1951) =

Russian footballer (born 1951)

Personal information
- Full name: Sergei Vladimirovich Grishin
- Date of birth: 22 December 1951 (age 74)
- Position: Forward

Senior career*
Years	Team	Apps	(Gls)
1969–1970	FC Volga Gorky	4	(1)
1970–1972	FC SKA Khabarovsk	?	(7)
1972–1974	FC Volga Gorky		
1975–1979	FC Torpedo Moscow	81	(24)
1981	FC TOZ Tula	24	(3)

Managerial career
- 1997: FC Chertanovo Moscow (asst)
- 2009–2021: FC Lokomotiv Moscow (administrator)
- * Club domestic league appearances and goals

Sergei Vladimirovich Grishin (Russian: Серге́й Влади́мирович Гри́шин; born 22 December 1951) is a former professional football functionary from Russia and a former Soviet player. Currently he works as an administrator for FC Lokomotiv Moscow.

His son Sergei played for the Russia national football team.

== Honours ==
- Soviet Top League champion: 1976 (autumn)
- Soviet Top League bronze: 1977
