= Sergei Grishin (footballer, born 1973) =

Russian footballer

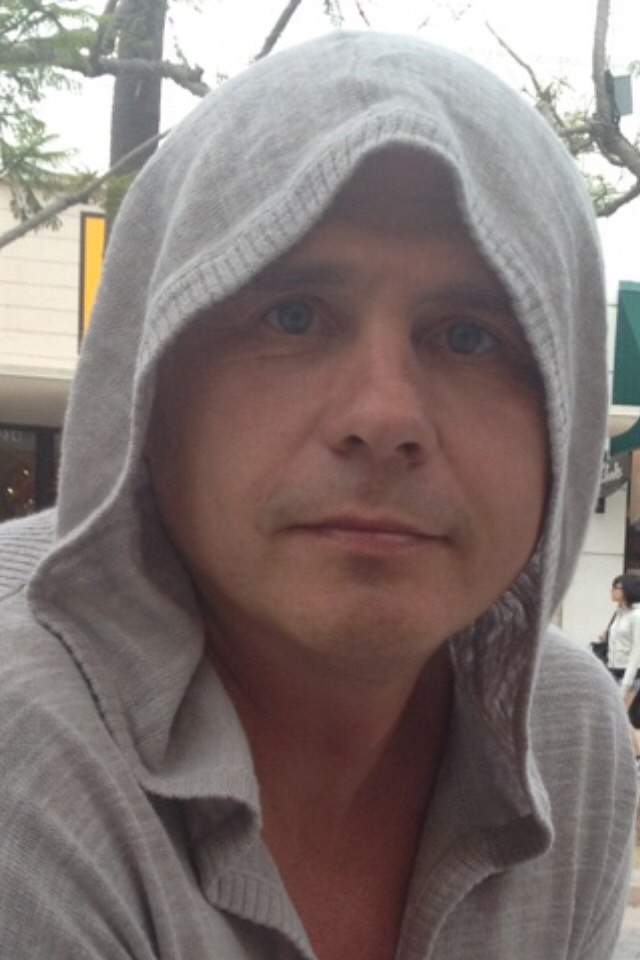
- Grishin in 2017

Personal information
- Full name: Sergei Sergeyevich Grishin
- Date of birth: 18 November 1973 (age 52)
- Place of birth: Moscow, Russian SFSR
- Height: 1.81 m (5 ft 11 in)
- Position: Midfielder

Youth career
- 1980—1981: FC Torpedo Moscow
- 1982—1987: FC Weimar
- 1987—1990: FC Torpedo Moscow

Senior career*
Years	Team	Apps	(Gls)
1991—1993	FC Torpedo Moscow	0	(0)
1992	→ FC Torpedo-d	28	(2)
1994–1995	FC Asmaral Moscow	77	(5)
1993	→ Asmaral Kislovodsk (loan)	11	(0)
1993–1994	→ FC Asmaral-d	18	(5)
1996–2000	FC Dynamo Moscow	113	(10)
1996–2000	→ FC Dynamo-d Moscow	3	(1)
2001–2004	FC Shinnik Yaroslavl	72	(5)
2005	FC Terek Grozny	0	(0)
2005	FC Anzhi Makhachkala	13	(0)
2005	Zhenis Astana	11	(0)

International career
1997	Russia	3	(1)

Managerial career
- 2021: FC Lokomotiv Moscow (U-19)
- 2021–2022: FC Kazanka Moscow (assistant)
- 2023: FC Torpedo Moscow (U-21 assistant)
- 2023: Academy FC Torpedo Moscow
- 2024: Academy FC Torpedo Moscow
- * Club domestic league appearances and goals

Sergei Sergeyevich Grishin (Russian: Серге́й Серге́евич Гришин; born 18 November 1973) is a Russian professional football coach and a former player.

== Honours ==
- Russian Premier League runner-up: 1997.
- Russian Cup runner-up: 1997, 1999.
- Kazakhstan Cup winner: 2005.
- Top 33 players year-end list: 1997.

== International career ==
Grishin played his first game for Russia on 30 April 1997 against Luxembourg in a 1998 FIFA World Cup qualifier, scoring a goal on his debut. He only played two more games for Russia.

== Career stats ==
Season	Club	Country	Level	Apps	Goals
2005	Zhenis Astana	Kazakhstan	I	11	0
2005	FC Anzhi Makhachkala	Russia	II	13	0
2005	FC Terek Grozny	Russia	I	0	0
2004	FC Shinnik Yaroslavl	Russia	I	24	0
2003	FC Shinnik Yaroslavl	Russia	I	20	1
2002	FC Shinnik Yaroslavl	Russia	I	28	4
2001	FC Shinnik Yaroslavl	Russia	II	29	3
2000	FC Dynamo Moscow	Russia	I	19	4
1999	FC Dynamo Moscow	Russia	I	24	1
1998	FC Dynamo Moscow	Russia	I	16	2
1997	FC Dynamo Moscow	Russia	I	28	1
1996	FC Dynamo Moscow	Russia	I	26	2
1995	Asmaral Moscow	Russia	II	40	3
1994	Asmaral Moscow	Russia	II	35	2
1993	Asmaral Kislovodsk	Russia	II	11	0
1993	Asmaral Moscow	Russia	I	2	0
1992	FC Torpedo Moscow	Russia	I	0	0
1991	FC Torpedo Moscow	USSR	I	0	0

== International goal ==
Scores and results list Russia's goal tally first.

No	Date	Venue	Opponent	Score	Result	Competition
1.	30 April 1997	Dynamo Stadium, Moscow, Russia	Luxembourg	2–0	3–0	1998 World Cup qualifier

== Personal life ==
His father Sergei Grishin also played football professionally, winning the title in the Soviet Top League in 1976.

In September 2022, Grishin received summons to appear at the military commissariat for potential call-up to the Russian Army during the 2022 Russian mobilization.
