= 2002 Karjala Tournament (November) =

2002 Karjala Tournament II
Tournament details
- Host countries: Finland; Czech Republic
- Cities: Helsinki; Pardubice
- Venues: 2 (in 2 host cities)
- Dates: 7-10 November 2002
- Teams: 4

Final positions
- Champions: Finland (6th title)
- Runners-up: Czech Republic
- Third place: Sweden
- Fourth place: Russia

Tournament statistics
- Games played: 6
- Goals scored: 33 (5.5 per game)
- Attendance: 40,331 (6,722 per game)
- Scoring leader: (Finland) Tommi Santala (3 points)

The 2002 Karjala Tournament II was played between 7 and 10 November 2002. The Czech Republic, Finland, Sweden and Russia played a round-robin for a total of three games per team and six games in total. One game was played in Rosvalla, Pardubice , Czech Republic (Czech Republic vs Sweden) all the other games was played in Hartwall Areena, Helsinki. Finland won the tournament. The tournament was part of the 2002–03 Euro Hockey Tour.

== Standings ==
Pos	Team	Pld	W	OTW	OTL	L	GF	GA	GD	Pts
1	Finland	3	3	0	0	0	12	3	+9	9
2	Czech Republic	3	1	0	1	1	8	8	0	4
3	Sweden	3	1	0	0	2	8	11	−3	3
4	Russia	3	0	1	0	2	5	11	−6	2

Source: flashscore

== Games ==
Helsinki – (Eastern European Time – UTC+2) Pardubice – (Central European Time – UTC+1)

7 November 2002; 17:00	Czech Republic	5-2 (1-0, 1-2, 3-0)	Sweden	Tipsport Arena, Pardubice; Attendance: 8,436

Game reference

Adam Svoboda
Goalies
Mikael Sandberg
Referee:
(Finland) Petr Kaislehto
Linesmen:
(Czech Republic) Pavel Blumel
(Czech Republic) Stanislav Barvir

05:43 – Radek Duda (Josef Beránek)	1-0
	1-1	22:24 – Peter Nordström (Thomas Rhodin) (PP)
23:59 – Jaroslav Hlinka (Petr Sykora)	2-1
	2-2	35:27 – Magnus Johansson (Ronnie Sundin, Per Hållberg) (PP)
48:51 – Vaclav Pletka (Michal Sykora) (PP)	3-2
50:07 – Petr Sykora (Jirí Hudler)	4-2
51:17 – Pavel Kolarik (Petr Tenkrat)	5-2

43 min
Penalties
35 min
32
Shots
29

7 November 2002; 18:30	Finland	5-0 (0-0, 1-0, 4-0)	Russia	Hartwall Areena, Helsinki; Attendance: 6,406

Game reference

Kari Lehtonen
Goalies
Maksim Sokolov
Referee:
(Sweden) Ulf Rådbjer
Linesmen:
(Finland) Panu Bruun
(Finland) Torkel Saarnio

33:40 – Jukka Hentunen (Petteri Nummelin)	1-0
41:37 – Jussi Tarvainen (Marko Kiprusoff, Petteri Nummelin)	2-0
45:00 – Eero Somervuori (Kimmo Rintanen, Petteri Nummelin)	3-0
45:31 – Rami Alanko (Marko Tuulola, Kimmo Rintanen)	4-0
45:11 – Tommi Santala (Kimmo Rintanen, Petteri Nummelin)	5-0

14 min
Penalties
74 min
30
Shots
19

9 November 2002; 15:00	Russia	1-3 (0-1,1-2,0-0)	Sweden	Hartwall Areena, Helsinki; Attendance: 0,000

Game reference

Maksim Sokolov
Goalies
Mikael Sandberg

	0-1	?
?	1-1
	1-2	?
	1-3	?

9 November 2002; 18:30	Finland	2-0 (0-0, 0-0, 2-0)	Czech Republic	Hartwall Areena, Helsinki; Attendance: 10,683

Game reference
Fredrik Norrena Kari Lehtonen	Goalies	Petr Briz	Referee: (Sweden) Ulf Rådbjer; Linesmen: (Finland) Stefan Fonselius (Finland) Serpoo Lindroos
40:23 – Ville Peltonen (Tommi Turunen, Markku Tähtinen) / 1-0; 59:25 – Toni Porkka (Kimmo Rintanen, Jani Hassinen) (PP/EN) / 2-0			Referee: (Sweden) Ulf Rådbjer; Linesmen: (Finland) Stefan Fonselius (Finland) Serpoo Lindroos
6 min	Penalties	43 min	Referee: (Sweden) Ulf Rådbjer; Linesmen: (Finland) Stefan Fonselius (Finland) Serpoo Lindroos
31	Shots	22	Referee: (Sweden) Ulf Rådbjer; Linesmen: (Finland) Stefan Fonselius (Finland) Serpoo Lindroos

10 November 2002; 15:00	Russia	4-3 OT (2-0, 0-2, 1-1) (OT: 0–0)	Czech Republic	Hartwall Areena, Helsinki; Attendance: 4,211

Game reference

Maksim Sokolov
Goalies
Petr Briza
Referee:
(Finland) Jyri Rönn
Linesmen:
(Finland) Antti Hämäläinen
(Finland) Petri Nokisalmi

09:08 – Sergueï Zinoviev (Igor Grigorenko)	1-0
15:17 – Denis Grebeshkov (Aleksei Chupin) (PP)	2-0
	2-1	20:23 – Radek Duda (Josef Beránek)
	2-2	37:15 – Josef Beránek (Frantisek Kucera, Radek Duda) (PP)
	2-3	44:35 – Frantisek Kucera (Josef Marha, Marek Zidlický) (PP)
49:44 – Sergueï Zinoviev (PP))	3-3
60:18 – Andrei Kovalenko (Sergueï Zinoviev)	4-3

14 min
Penalties
8 min
26
Shots
25

10 November 2002; 18:30	Finland	5-3 (2-1, 1-0, 2-2)	Sweden	Hartwall Areena, Helsinki; Attendance: 10,595

Game reference

Kari Lehtonen
Goalies
Rolf Wanhainen
Referee:
(Czech Republic) Milan Minar
Linesmen:
(Finland) Torkel Saarnio
(Finland) Panu Bruun

01:16 – Jani Hassinen (Kimmo Rintanen) (PP)	1-0
	1-1	06:57 – Niklas Nordgren (Jonas Rönnqvist, Niklas Anger)
15:10 – Tommi Santala (Marko Tuulola)	2-1
28:27 – Mikko Luoma (Esa Pirnes)	3-1
	3-2	42:51 – Ulf Söderström (Ronnie Sundin, Mika Hannula)
	3-3	49:11 – Niklas Nordgren (Per Hållberg, Jonas Rönnqvist)
51:04 – Tommi Santala (Petteri Nummelin, Antti Miettinen) (PP)	4-3
58:58 – Ville Peltonen (Esa Pirnes)	5-3

10 min
Penalties
10 min
24
Shots
19

== Scoring leaders ==
Pos	Player	Country	GP	G	A	Pts	+/−	PIM	POS
1	Kimmo Rintanen	Finland	3	0	5	5	+2	0	LW
2	Petteri Nummelin	Finland	3	0	5	5	+3	2	RD
3	Tommi Santala	Finland	3	3	0	3	+2	2	CE
4	Sergei Zinovjev	Russia	3	2	1	3	+2	25	LW
5	Radek Duda	Czech Republic	3	2	1	3	+2	10	RW

GP = Games played; G = Goals; A = Assists; Pts = Points; +/− = Plus/minus; PIM = Penalties in minutes; POS = Position
Source: swehockey

== Goaltending leaders ==
Pos	Player	Country	TOI	GA	GAA	Sv%	SO
1	Kari Lehtonen	Finland	160:00	3	1.13	94.34	1
2	Petr Bříza	Czech Republic	120:08	5	2.50	91.07	0
3	Rolf Wanhainen	Sweden	79:27	4	3.02	88.57	0
4	Mikael Sandberg	Sweden	100:00	6	3.60	86.05	0
5	Maxim Sokolov	Russia	180:18	11	3.66	85.53	0

TOI = Time on ice (minutes:seconds); SA = Shots against; GA = Goals against; GAA = Goals Against Average; Sv% = Save percentage; SO = Shutouts
Source: swehockey

== Best players ==
The tournament directorate named the following players in the tournament 2002 II:

- Best goalkeeper: (Finland) Kari Lehtonen
- Best defenceman: (Finland) Petteri Nummelin
- Best forward: (Czech Republic) Radek Duda

Media All-Star Team:

- Goaltender: (Finland) Kari Lehtonen
- Defence: (Finland) Petteri Nummelin, (Finland) Marko Tuulola
- Forwards: (Finland) Kimmo Rintanen, (Czech Republic) Radek Duda, (Finland) Ville Peltonen
