= 2004 Karjala Tournament =

Tournament details
- Host countries: Finland; Sweden
- Cities: Helsinki; Linköping
- Venues: 2 (in 2 host cities)
- Dates: 11–14 November 2004
- Teams: 4

Final positions
- Champions: Finland (8th title)
- Runners-up: Sweden
- Third place: Czech Republic
- Fourth place: Russia

Tournament statistics
- Games played: 6
- Goals scored: 34 (5.67 per game)
- Attendance: 45,559 (7,593 per game)
- Scoring leader: (Finland) Jussi Jokinen

The 2004 Karjala Tournament was played between 11 and 14 November 2004. The Czech Republic, Finland, Sweden and Russia played a round-robin for a total of three games per team and six games in total. One game was played in Cloetta Center, Linköping, Sweden (Sweden vs Russia) all the other games was played in Hartwall Areena, Helsinki. Finland won the tournament. The tournament was part of the 2004–05 Euro Hockey Tour.

== Standings ==
Pos	Team	Pld	W	OTW	OTL	L	GF	GA	GD	Pts
1	Finland	3	2	0	0	1	9	8	+1	6
2	Sweden	3	1	1	0	1	7	8	−1	5
3	Czech Republic	3	1	0	1	1	8	9	−1	4
4	Russia	3	1	0	0	2	10	9	+1	3

Source: flashscore

== Games ==
Helsinki – (Eastern European Time – UTC+2) Linköping – (Central European Time – UTC+1)

11 November 2004; 17:30	Finland	0-3 (0-0, 0-2, 0-1)	Czech Republic	Hartwall Areena, Helsinki; Attendance: 7,574

Game reference

Fredrik Norrena
Goalies
Adam Svoboda
Referee:
(Sweden) Ulf Rönnmark
Linesmen:
(Finland) Stefan Fonselius
(Finland) Seppo Lindroos

0-1	24:42 – Pavel Rosa
0-2	37:13 – Aleš Hemský (Petr Prucha) (PP)
0-3	58:47 – Radek Dvorák (Václav Prospal) (EN)

12 min
Penalties
14 min
28
Shots
23

11 November 2004; 19:00	Sweden	2-1 (1-0, 0-1, 1-0)	Russia	Cloetta Center, Linköping; Attendance: 6,735

Game reference

Henrik Lundqvist
Goalies
Maksim Sokolov
Referee:
(Finland) Tom Laaksonen
Linesmen:
(Finland) Leo Takula
(Sweden) Mikael Ljungqvist

15:10 – Magnus Kahnberg (Henrik Tallinder, Henrik Lundqvist)	1-0
	1-1	39:01 – Aleksandr Ovechkin (Alekseï Kaïgorodov, Aleksandr Boïkov)
00:00 – Henrik Zetterberg (Daniel Sedin)	2-1

8 min
Penalties
8 min
43
Shots
22

13 November 2004; 14:00	Czech Republic	2-3 GWS (1-0, 1-1, 0-1) (OT: 0–0) (SO: 0–1)	Sweden	Hartwall Areena, Helsinki; Attendance: 4,000

Game reference

Adam Svoboda
Goalies
Henrik Lundqvist
Referee:
(Finland) Jyri Rönn
Linesmen:
(Finland) Stefan Fonselius
(Finland) Antti Hämäläinen

27:01 – Radek Dvorák (Václav Prospal, Karel Pilar)	1-0
	1-1	05:10 – Jonathan Hedström (Henrik Zetterberg) (PP)
49:39 – Michal Mikeska (Aleš Hemský)	2-1
	2-2	39:51 – Christian Bäckman (Thomas Rhodin, Niklas Nordgrén) (PP)

Rosa (miss)
Židlický (miss)
Dvorák (miss)
Shootout
Weinhandl (miss)
Zetterberg (miss)
Kahnberg
18 min
Penalties
39 min
23
Shots
27

13 November 2004; 17:30	Finland	4-3 (2-1, 1-1, 1-1)	Russia	Hartwall Areena, Helsinki; Attendance: 11,400

Game reference

Niklas Backstrom
Goalies
Maksim Sokolov
Referee:
(Czech Republic) Milan Minar
Linesmen:
(Finland) Juha Kautto
(Finland) Mikko Kekäläinen

01:58 – Petri Pakaslahti (Aki-Petteri Berg, Jarkko Ruutu)	1-0
	1-1	12:40 – Ilya Kovalchuk (Sergueï Gusev, Alekseï Simakov)
18:19 – Jarkko Ruutu (Jani Rita, Lasse Kukkonen)	2-1
28:18 – Ville Peltonen (Jussi Jokinen, Tuukka Mäntylä) (PP)	3-1
	3-2	29:33 – Aleksandr Skugarev (Ilya Kovalchuk, Alekseï Simakov)
	3-3	47:15 – Evgueni Gladskikh (Alekseï Kaïgorodov) (BP)
59:21 – Jussi Jokinen (Ville Peltonen, Petteri Nummelin) (PP)	4-3

16 min
Penalties
38 min
33
Shots
30

14 November 2004; 14:00	Russia	6-3 (2-1, 3-1, 1-1)	Czech Republic	Hartwall Areena, Helsinki; Attendance: 3,000

Game reference

Aleksandr Eremenko
Goalies
Tomáš Duba Adam Svoboda
Referee:
(Finland) Jari Levonen
Linesmen:
(Finland) Juha Kautto
(Finland) Seppo Lindroo

	0-1	12:42 – Židlický (David Výborný) (PP)
13:19 – Aleksandr Skugarev (Maksim Afinogenov) (PP)	1-1
17:07 – Alekseï Simakov (Ilya Kovalchuk)	2-1
28:35 – Ilya Kovalchuk (Aleksandr Skugarev, Alekseï Simakov)	3-1
37:09 – Aleksandr Skugarev (Aleksandr Ovechkin)	4-1
	4-2	37:57 – Radek Dvorák (Pavel Rosa)
38:57 – Alekseï Kaïgorodov (Maksim Afinogenov, Aleksandr Ovechkin)	5-2
	5-3	58:08 – Jirí Burger (Aleš Hemský, Židlický)
59:47 – Ilya Kovalchuk (Aleksandr Skugarev) (EN	6-3

16 min
Penalties
12 min
26
Shots
47

14 November 2004; 17:30	Finland	5-2 (2-1, 1-0, 2-1)	Sweden	Hartwall Areena, Helsinki; Attendance: 12,850

Game reference

Fredrik Norrena
Goalies
Daniel Henriksson
Referee:
(Czech Republic) Milan Minar
Linesmen:
(Finland) Antti Hämäläinen
(Finland) Mikko Kekäläinen

	0-1	02:38 – Henrik Zetterberg (Thomas Rhodin) (PP)
04:03 – Petteri Nummelin (Tomi Kallio) (PP)	1-1
17:24 – Tomi Kallio (Ville Peltonen, Jari Viuhkola)	2-1
31:32 – Jussi Jokinen (Ville Peltonen, Tomi Kallio)	3-1
	3-2	41:20 – Mathias Tjärnqvist (Magnus Johansson, Henrik Tallinder) (PP)
48:21 – Jussi Jokinen (Aki-Petteri Berg, Ville Peltonen) (PP)	4-2
59:27 – Jussi Jokinen (Mikko Eloranta, Jarkko Immonen)	5-2

26 min
Penalties
28 min
27
Shots
33

== Scoring leaders ==
Pos	Player	Country	GP	G	A	Pts	+/−	PIM	POS
1	Jussi Jokinen	Finland	3	4	1	5	+2	0	LW
2	Ilya Kovalchuk	Russia	3	3	2	5	+5	0	RW
3	Alexander Skugarev	Russia	3	3	2	5	+6	6	CE
4	Ville Peltonen	Finland	3	1	4	5	+2	6	LW
5	Alexei Simakov	Russia	3	1	3	4	+5	0	LW

GP = Games played; G = Goals; A = Assists; Pts = Points; +/− = Plus/minus; PIM = Penalties in minutes; POS = Position
Source: swehockey

== Goaltending leaders ==
Pos	Player	Country	TOI	GA	GAA	Sv%	SO
1	Adam Svoboda	Czech Republic	144:50	3	1.24	95.00	1
2	Henrik Lundqvist	Sweden	125:00	3	1.44	93.33	0
3	Fredrik Norrena	Finland	119:48	4	2.00	92.73	0
4	Maxim Sokolov	Russia	119:27	6	3.01	92.11	0

TOI = Time on ice (minutes:seconds); SA = Shots against; GA = Goals against; GAA = Goals Against Average; Sv% = Save percentage; SO = Shutouts
Source: swehockey

== Tournament awards ==
The tournament directorate named the following players in the tournament 2004:

- Best goalkeeper: (Sweden) Henrik Lundqvist
- Best defenceman: (Finland) Petteri Nummelin
- Best forward: (Russia) Ilya Kovalchuk

Media All-Star Team:

- Goaltender: (Czech Republic) Adam Svoboda
- Defence: (Sweden) Christian Bäckman, (Czech Republic) Marek Židlický
- Forwards: (Russia) Ilya Kovalchuk, (Sweden) Henrik Zetterberg, (Czech Republic) Pavel Rosa
