= 2007 Karjala Tournament =

Tournament details
- Host countries: Finland; Sweden
- Cities: Helsinki; Jönköping
- Venues: 2 (in 2 host cities)
- Dates: 8-11 November 2007
- Teams: 4

Final positions
- Champions: Russia (2nd title)
- Runners-up: Sweden
- Third place: Czech Republic
- Fourth place: Finland

Tournament statistics
- Games played: 6
- Goals scored: 24 (4 per game)
- Attendance: 48,658 (8,110 per game)
- Scoring leader(s): (Sweden) Andreas Holmqvist (Russia) Fedor Fedorov (3 points)

The 2007 Karjala Tournament was played between 8 and 11 November 2007. The Czech Republic, Finland, Sweden and Russia played a round-robin for a total of three games per team and six games in total. Five games were played in Finland and one was played in Sweden. Russia won the tournament before Sweden and the Czech Republic. The tournament was part of the 2007-08 Euro Hockey Tour.

Sweden opened the tournament in Jönköping, losing 1–3 against Russia.

== Standings ==
Pos	Team	Pld	W	OTW	OTL	L	GF	GA	GD	Pts
1	Russia	3	2	0	0	1	8	4	+4	6
2	Sweden	3	2	0	0	1	6	5	+1	6
3	Czech Republic	3	1	0	0	2	6	10	−4	3
4	Finland	3	1	0	0	2	4	5	−1	3

Source: flashscore

== Games ==
Helsinki – (Eastern European Time – UTC+2) Jönköping – (Central European Time – UTC+1)

8 November 2007; 18:15	Finland	2-3 (1-1, 0-0, 1-2)	Czech Republic	Hartwall Areena, Helsinki; Attendance: 6,643

Game reference

Antti Niemi
Goalies
Milan Hnilicka
Referee:
(Sweden) Ulf Rönnmark
Linesmen:
(Finland) Jussi Terho
(Finland) Mikko Kekäläinen

	0-1	02:35 – Petr Kumstát (Vaclav Skuhravý, Vladimir Sicák) (PP)
03:55 – Teemu Aalto (Jarkko Immonen)	1-1
	1-2	40:41 – Tomas Rolinek (Leos Cermák, Josef Melichar) (PP)
50:09 – Janne Pesonen (Tommi Santala)	2-2
	2-3	58:09 – Jan Marek (PEN)

10 min
Penalties
18 min
31
Shots
27

8 November 2007; 19:30	Sweden	1-3 (1-2, 0-0, 0-1))	Russia	Kinnarps Arena, Jönköping; Attendance: 7,038

Game reference

Stefan Liv
Goalies
Alexander Eremenko
Referee:
(Czech Republic) Vladimir Sindler
Linesmen:
(Sweden) Christian Jönsson
(Sweden) Johan Sjödahl

	0-1	06:49 – Sergei Zinoviev (Sergei Mozyakin, Vladimir Antipov) (PP)
11:18 – Kenny Jönsson (Fredrik Warg, Nils Ekman)	1-1
	1-2	13:31 – Alexei Tereschenko (Fedor Fedorov, Dmitri Afanasenkov)
	1-3	54:00 – Evgeni Medvedev (Aleksei Simakov, Fedor Fedorov)

14 min
Penalties
16 min
30
Shots
24

10 November 2007; 14:15	Sweden	4-2 (1-0, 1-1, 2-1)	Czech Republic	Hartwall Areena, Helsinki; Attendance: 7,105

Game reference

Jhonas Enroth
Goalies
Tomas Duba
Referee:
(Finland) Jari Levonen
Linesmen:
(Finland) Stefan Fonselius
(Finland) Antti Orelma

08:18 – Tony Mårtensson (Andreas Holmqvist, Rickard Wallin) (PP)	1-0
	1-1	22:04 – Leos Cermák (Josef Straka, Josef Melichar) (PP)
33:57 – Andreas Holmqvist (Tony Mårtensson)	2-1
42:54 – Tony Mårtensson (Rickard Wallin, Andreas Holmqvist)	3-1
	3-2	45:41 – Tomas Rolinek (Vaclav Varada, Jan Marek) (PP)
56:19 – Christian Berglund (Johan Andersson)	4-2

16 min
Penalties
16 min
30
Shots
31

10 November 2007; 18:15	Finland	2-1 (0-0, 1-0, 1-1)	Russia	Hartwall Areena, Helsinki; Attendance: 11,702

Game reference

Jussi Markkanen
Goalies
Dmitri Yachano
Referee:
(Sweden) Ulf Rönnmark
Linesmen:
(Finland) Mikko Kekäläinen
(Finland) Jouni Saukkonen

27:54 – Antti Laaksonen (Toni Koivisto)	1-0
41:26 – Toni Koivisto	2-0
	2-1	51:11 – Oleg Saprykin (Aleksei Simakov)

14 min
Penalties
40 min
26
Shots
33

11 November 2007; 14:15	Russia	4-1 (1-0, 1-1, 2-0)	Czech Republic	Hartwall Areena, Helsinki; Attendance: 6,159

Game reference

Aleksandr Eremenko
Goalies
Milan Hnilicka
Referee:
(Finland) Sami Partanen
Linesmen:
(Finland) Jouni Saukkonen
(Finland) Jussi Terho

00:46 – Fedor Fedorov (Dmitri Afanasenkov)	1-0
20:38 – Vitaly Proshkin (Ilya Nikulin, Sergei Mozyakin) (PP)	2-0
	2-1	36:57 – Zbynek Irgl (Filip Novák)
49:10 – Timofei Shishkanov (Ivan Nepryaev, Nikolaï Kulemin)	3-1
53:30 – Konstantin Korneev (Anton Kuryanov) (PP)	4-1

16 min
Penalties
12 min
22
Shots
43

11 November 2007; 18:15	Finland	0-1 (0-0, 0-0, 0-1)	Sweden	Hartwall Areena, Helsinki; Attendance: 10,011

Game reference
Jussi Markkanen	Goalies	Stefan Liv	Referee: (Russia) Aleksandr Poliakov; Linesmen: (Finland) Stefan Fonselius (Finland) Antti Orelma
0-1 / 43:43 – Nils Ekman (Linus Videll)			Referee: (Russia) Aleksandr Poliakov; Linesmen: (Finland) Stefan Fonselius (Finland) Antti Orelma
8 min	Penalties	8 min	Referee: (Russia) Aleksandr Poliakov; Linesmen: (Finland) Stefan Fonselius (Finland) Antti Orelma
18	Shots	26	Referee: (Russia) Aleksandr Poliakov; Linesmen: (Finland) Stefan Fonselius (Finland) Antti Orelma

== Scoring leaders ==
Pos	Player	Country	GP	G	A	Pts	+/−	PIM	POS
1	Andreas Holmqvist	Sweden	3	1	2	3	+1	0	RD
2	Fedor Fedorov	Russia	3	1	2	3	+2	14	CE
3	Rickard Wallin	Sweden	3	0	3	3	+1	4	CE
4	Oleg Saprykin	Russia	3	2	0	2	+2	2	CE
5	Tomáš Rolinek	Czech Republic	3	2	0	2	+1	4	LW

GP = Games played; G = Goals; A = Assists; Pts = Points; +/− = Plus/minus; PIM = Penalties in minutes; POS = Position
Source: swehockey

== Goaltending leaders ==
Pos	Player	Country	TOI	GA	GAA	Sv%	SO
1	Alexander Yeryomenko	Russia	120:00	2	1.00	97.26	0
2	Jussi Markkanen	Finland	119:24	2	1.01	96.61	0
3	Stefan Liv	Sweden	119:01	3	1.51	92.86	1
4	Milan Hnilička	Czech Republic	120:00	6	3.00	88.68	0

TOI = Time on ice (minutes:seconds); SA = Shots against; GA = Goals against; GAA = Goals Against Average; Sv% = Save percentage; SO = Shutouts
Source: swehockey

== Tournament awards ==
The tournament directorate named the following players in the tournament 2007:

- Best player: (Sweden) Andreas Holmqvist
- Best goalkeeper: (Finland) Jussi Markkanen
- Best defenceman: (Sweden) Kenny Jönsson
- Best forward: (Russia) Oleg Saprykin

Media All-Star Team:

- Goaltender: (Finland) Jussi Markkanen
- Defence: (Finland) Janne Niinimaa, (Sweden) Andreas Holmqvist
- Forwards: (Sweden) Tony Mårtensson, (Czech Republic) Jan Marek, (Finland) Toni Koivisto
