= 2011 Karjala Tournament =

2011 Karjala Tournament (Euro Hockey Games)
Tournament details
- Host countries: Finland; Sweden
- Cities: Helsinki; Örnsköldsvik
- Venues: 2 (in 2 host cities)
- Dates: 10–13 November 2011
- Teams: 4

Final positions
- Champions: Russia (6th title)
- Runners-up: Finland
- Third place: Czech Republic
- Fourth place: Sweden

Tournament statistics
- Games played: 6
- Goals scored: 29 (4.83 per game)
- Attendance: 49,852 (8,309 per game)
- Scoring leader: (Russia) Alexander Radulov (5 points)

The 2011 Karjala Tournament was played between 10 and 13 November 2011. The Czech Republic, Finland, Sweden and Russia played a round-robin for a total of three games per team and six games in total. Five of the matches were played in the Hartwall Areena in Helsinki, Finland, and one match in the Fjällräven Center in Örnsköldsvik, Sweden. The tournament was won by Russia, who won all their three games. The tournament was part of 2011–12 Euro Hockey Tour.

== Standings ==
Pos	Team	Pld	W	OTW	OTL	L	GF	GA	GD	Pts
1	Russia	3	2	1	0	0	8	3	+5	8
2	Finland	3	1	0	1	1	8	6	+2	4
3	Czech Republic	3	1	0	0	2	6	8	−2	3
4	Sweden	3	1	0	0	2	7	12	−5	3

Source: eurohockey

== Games ==
Helsinki – (Eastern European Time – UTC+2) Örnsköldsvik – (Central European Time – UTC+1)

10 November 2011; 18:30	Russia	2–1 GWS (1–0, 0–0, 0–1) (OT: 0–0) (SO: 1–0)	Finland	Hartwall Areena, Helsinki; Attendance: 11,244

Game reference
Konstantin Barulin	Goalies	Karri Rämö	Referees: (Sweden) Sören Persson (Sweden) Mikael Nord
? / 1–0; / 1–1 / ?			Referees: (Sweden) Sören Persson (Sweden) Mikael Nord
?	Shootout		Referees: (Sweden) Sören Persson (Sweden) Mikael Nord
18 min	Penalties	6 min	Referees: (Sweden) Sören Persson (Sweden) Mikael Nord
31	Shots	34	Referees: (Sweden) Sören Persson (Sweden) Mikael Nord

10 November 2011; 19:00	Sweden	2–5 (0–1, 2–1, 0–3)	Czech Republic	Fjällräven Center, Örnsköldsvik; Attendance: 5,227

Game reference

Gustaf Wesslau
Goalies
Jakub Štěpánek
Referees:
(Russia) Vyacheslav Bulanov
(Russia) Alexey Ravodin

	0–1	?
	0–2	?
?	1–2
?	2–2
	2–3	?
	2–4	?
	2–5	?

8 min
Penalties
10 min
28
Shots
27

12 November 2011; 13:00	Sweden	1–4 (0–2, 1–0, 0–2)	Russia	Hartwall Areena, Helsinki; Attendance: 5,578

Game reference

Gustaf Wesslau
Goalies
Mikhail Biryukov
Referees:
(Finland) Jari Leppäalho
(Finland) Jari Levonen

	0–1	?
	0–2	?
?	1–2
	1–3	?
	1–4	?

10 min
Penalties
10 min
24
Shots
21

12 November 2011; 17:00	Finland	4–0 (1–0, 2–0, 1–0)	Czech Republic	Hartwall Areena, Helsinki; Attendance: 11,814

Game reference

Niko Hovinen
Goalies
Jakub Štěpánek
Referees:
(Sweden) Sören Persson
(Sweden) Mikael Nord

?	1–0
?	2–0
?	3–0
?	4–0

2 min
Penalties
6 min
31
Shots
22

13 November 2011; 13:00	Czech Republic	1–2 (0–0, 1–0, 0–2)	Russia	Hartwall Areena, Helsinki; Attendance: 3,794

Game reference

Jakub Kovář
Goalies
Konstantin Barulin
Referees:
(Finland) Antti Boman
(Russia) Alexei Rantala

?	1–0
	1–1	?
	1–2	?

14 min
Penalties
14 min
23
Shots
24

13 November 2011; 17:00	Finland	3–4 (1–1, 0–3, 2–0)	Sweden	Hartwall Areena, Helsinki; Attendance: 12,195

Game reference

Karri Rämö
Goalies
Johan Gustafsson
Referees:
(Czech Republic) Martin Frano
(Czech Republic) Jan Hribik

J. Immonen (M. Granlund, S. Vatanen) (PP) – 05:14	1–0
	1–1	18:29 – (PP) N. Danielsson (C. Järnkrok, C. Bäckman)
	1–2	27:33 – M. Thörnberg (P. Zackrisson, J. Brodin)
	1–3	32:35 – (PP) C. Bäckman (J. Fasth, F. Warg)
	1–4	38:24 – (SH) M. Thörnberg (P. Zackrisson, K. Dahlbeck)
S. Vatanen (M. Granlund) (PP2) – 39:15	2–4
L. Komarov (J. Joensuu, M. Kuparinen) – 48:58	3–4

18 min
Penalties
20 min
38
Shots
24

== Scoring leaders ==
Pos	Player	Country	GP	G	A	Pts	+/−	PIM	POS
1	Alexander Radulov	Russia	3	4	1	5	0	4	FW
2	Jarkko Immonen	Finland	3	3	1	4	+2	0	FW
3	Janne Pesonen	Finland	3	1	3	4	+3	2	FW
4	Mikael Granlund	Finland	3	0	4	4	+2	2	FW
5	Petr Nedvěd	Czech Republic	3	3	0	3	0	2	FW
6	Sami Vatanen	Finland	3	2	1	3	0	0	DF
7	Ilya Nikulin	Russia	3	0	3	3	+2	2	DF
8	Jakub Petružálek	Czech Republic	3	2	0	2	+2	0	FW
8	Martin Thörnberg	Sweden	3	2	0	2	0	0	FW
10	Evgeny Kuznetsov	Russia	3	2	0	2	+1	0	FW

GP = Games played; G = Goals; A = Assists; Pts = Points; +/− = Plus/minus; PIM = Penalties in minutes; POS = Position
Source: Swehockey

== Goaltending leaders ==
Pos	Player	Country	TOI	GA	GAA	Sv%	SO
1	Niko Hovinen	Finland	85:31	1	0.70	96.67	1
2	Konstantin Barulin	Russia	125:00	2	0.96	96.47	0
3	Jakub Štěpánek	Czech Republic	120:00	6	3.00	89.83	0
4	Karri Rämö	Finland	98:36	5	3.04	89.36	0
5	Gustaf Wesslau	Sweden	118:58	8	4.03	82.98	0

TOI = Time on ice (minutes:seconds); SA = Shots against; GA = Goals against; GAA = Goals against average; Sv% = Save percentage; SO = Shutouts

== Tournament awards ==
Best players selected by the directorate:

- Best Goalkeeper: (Russia) Konstantin Barulin
- Best Defenceman: (Russia) Ilya Nikulin
- Best Forward: (Finland) Jarkko Immonen
- Top Scorer: (Russia) Alexander Radulov (4 goals, 1 assist)

Tournament All-Star Team selected by the media:

- Goaltender: (Russia) Konstantin Barulin
- Defencemen: (Russia) Ilya Nikulin, (Finland) Sami Vatanen
- Forwards: (Finland) Mikael Granlund, (Finland) Jarkko Immonen, (Russia) Alexander Radulov
