= 2002 Karjala Tournament (April) =

2002 Karjala Tournament I
Tournament details
- Host countries: Finland; Sweden
- Cities: Helsinki; Stockholm
- Venues: 2 (in 2 host cities)
- Dates: 18-21 April 2002
- Teams: 4

Final positions
- Champions: Finland (5th title)
- Runners-up: Czech Republic
- Third place: Sweden
- Fourth place: Russia

Tournament statistics
- Games played: 6
- Goals scored: 33 (5.5 per game)
- Attendance: 40,331 (6,722 per game)

The 2002 Karjala Tournament I was played between 18 and 21 April 2002. The Czech Republic, Finland, Sweden and Russia played a round-robin for a total of three games per team and six games in total. One game was played in Globen, Stockholm, Sweden (Sweden vs Czech Republic ) all the other games were played in Hartwall Areena, Helsinki. Finland won the tournament. The tournament was part of the 2001–02 Euro Hockey Tour.

== Standings ==
Pos	Team	Pld	W	OTW	OTL	L	GF	GA	GD	Pts
1	Finland	3	2	1	0	0	10	5	+5	8
2	Russia	3	1	1	1	0	8	5	+3	6
3	Sweden	3	1	0	1	1	7	7	0	4
4	Czech Republic	3	0	0	0	3	6	14	−8	0

Source: flashscore

== Games ==
Helsinki – (Eastern European Time – UTC+2) Pardubice – (Central European Time – UTC+1)

18 April 2002; 17:30	Finland	2-1 GWS (0-0, 1-0, 0-1) (OT: 0–0) (SO: 1–0)	Russia	Hartwall Areena, Helsinki; Attendance: 6,491

Game reference
Fredrik Norrena	Goalies	Yegor Podomatsky	Referee: (Sweden) Christer Lärking; Linesmen: (Finland) Juhani Bruun (Finland) Ilkka
Kakko (Aalto, Koivisto) – 32:00 / 1-0; / 1-1 / 47:00 – Gusmanov (Kovalenko, Gorovikov)			Referee: (Sweden) Christer Lärking; Linesmen: (Finland) Juhani Bruun (Finland) Ilkka
Koivisto	Shootout		Referee: (Sweden) Christer Lärking; Linesmen: (Finland) Juhani Bruun (Finland) Ilkka
12 min	Penalties	8 min	Referee: (Sweden) Christer Lärking; Linesmen: (Finland) Juhani Bruun (Finland) Ilkka

18 April 2002; 19:00	Sweden	4-2 (1-2, 2-0, 1-0)	Czech Republic	Globen, Stockholm; Attendance: 9,126

Game reference
Stefan Liv	Goalies	Dušan Salfický	Referee: (Germany) Willi Schimm; Linesmen: (Finland) Jakob Karlsson (Sweden) Svensson
Jönsson (Weinhandl, M.Johansson) – 10:54 / Weinhandl (N.Andersson, Sundin) – 28:37 / M.Johansson (T.Johansson, Ekman) – 38:32 / [[]] ([[]], [[]]) – XX:XX / Goals / XX:XX – [[]] ([[]], [[]]) / XX:XX – [[]] ([[]], [[]])			Referee: (Germany) Willi Schimm; Linesmen: (Finland) Jakob Karlsson (Sweden) Svensson
16 min	Penalties	12 min	Referee: (Germany) Willi Schimm; Linesmen: (Finland) Jakob Karlsson (Sweden) Svensson
28	Shots	22	Referee: (Germany) Willi Schimm; Linesmen: (Finland) Jakob Karlsson (Sweden) Svensson

20 April 2002; 15:00	Finland	6-3 (2-0, 1-0, 3-3)	Czech Republic	Hartwall Areena, Helsinki; Attendance: 10,628

Game reference

Kari Lehtonen
Goalies
Dušan Salfický
Referee:
(Russia) Sergei Karabanov
Linesmen:
(Finland) Hämäläinen
(Finland) Peltonen

Koivisto (Turunen, Tuulola) – 02:38	1-0
Pärssinen (Miettinen, Kakko) – 13:49	2-0
Pärssinen (Aalto, Koivisto) – 28:27	3-0
Pirjetä (Somervuori, Koivisto) – 40:39	4-0
Miettinen (Pärssinen, Koivisto) – 48:18	5-0
	5-1	55:27 – Marušák (Leška, Balaštík)
	5-2	55:44 – Míka (Štrba)
	5-3	57:26 – Pivko (Balaštík)
Pärssinen (Aalto, Somervuori) – 58:22	6-3

22 min
Penalties
22 min
24
Shots
29

20 April 2002; 18:30	Russia	3-2 GWS (0-2, 1-0, 1-0) (OT: 0–0) (SO: 1–0)	Sweden	Hartwall Areena, Helsinki

Game reference

	0-1	?
	0-2
?	1-2
?	2-2

21 April 2002; 14:00	Czech Republic	1-4 (0-2, 1-1, 0-1)	Russia	Hartwall Areena, Helsinki

Game reference

	0-1	?
	0-2	?
?	1-2
	1-3	?
	1-4	?

21 April 2002; 17:30	Finland	2-1 (0-0,0-0,2-1)	Sweden	Hartwall Areena, Helsinki

Game reference

?	1-0
	1-1	?
?	2-1
