= 2008 Karjala Tournament =

2008 Karjala Tournament (Euro Hockey Games)
Tournament details
- Host countries: Finland; Russia
- Cities: Helsinki; Moscow
- Venues: 2 (in 2 host cities)
- Dates: 6–9 November 2008
- Teams: 4

Final positions
- Champions: Russia (3rd title)
- Runners-up: Finland
- Third place: Czech Republic
- Fourth place: Sweden

Tournament statistics
- Games played: 6
- Goals scored: 24 (4 per game)
- Attendance: 46,131 (7,689 per game)
- Scoring leader: (Russia) Aleksei Mikhnov (3 points)

Awards
- MVP: (Russia) Aleksei Mikhnov

The 2008 Karjala Tournament was played between 6 and 9 November 2008. The Czech Republic, Finland, Sweden and Russia played a round-robin for a total of three games per team and six games in total. One match was played in Moscow, Russia the rest of the matches were played in Helsinki, Finland. Russia won the tournament. The tournament was part of 2008–09 Euro Hockey Tour.

== Standings ==
Pos	Team	Pld	W	OTW	OTL	L	GF	GA	GD	Pts
1	Russia	3	2	1	0	0	8	2	+6	8
2	Czech Republic	3	1	0	2	0	7	6	+1	5
3	Sweden	3	1	0	0	2	3	5	−2	3
4	Finland	3	0	1	0	2	6	11	−5	2

Source: flashscore

== Games ==
All times are local. Helsinki – (Eastern European Time – UTC+2) Moscow – (Eastern European Time – UTC+2)

6 November 2008; 17:30	Czech Republic	3-4 GWS (1-1, 1-1, 1-1) (OT: 0–0) (SO: 0–1)	Finland	Helsinki Halli, Helsinki; Attendance: 7,120

Game reference

Lukas Mensator
Goalies
Juuso Riksman
Referees:
(Sweden) Niklas Persson
(Sweden) Marcus Vinnerborg
Linesmen:
(Finland) Mikko Kekäläinen
(Finland) Mika Tarvo

01:52 – Miroslav Blaták (Vaclav Skuhravý, Miloslav Horava) (PP)	1-0
	1-1	11:47 – Sami Kapanen (Petteri Nummelin)
32:33 – Jakub Klepis (Zdenek Kutlák)	2-1
	2-2	38:17 – Hannes Hyvönen (Riku Hahl, Mika Pyörälä) (PP)
	2-3	49:15 – Tommi Santala (Jari Sailio)
59:35 – Leos Cermák	3-3

Klepis
Marek (miss)
Vampola (miss)
Klepis (miss)
Shootout
Nummelin
Kapanen (miss)
Pirnes (miss)
Nummelin
16 min
Penalties
14 min
29
Shots
36

6 November 2008; 18:00	Russia	1-0 (0-0, 0-0, 1-0)	Sweden	VTB Ice Palace, Moscow; Attendance: 7,120

Game reference
Aleksandr Eremenko	Goalies	Johan Holmqvist	Referees: (Czech Republic) Milan Minar (Czech Republic) Martin Homola
56:29 Aleksei Mikhnov (Piotr Schastlivy, Anton But) / 1-0			Referees: (Czech Republic) Milan Minar (Czech Republic) Martin Homola
8 min	Penalties	16 min	Referees: (Czech Republic) Milan Minar (Czech Republic) Martin Homola
31	Shots	19	Referees: (Czech Republic) Milan Minar (Czech Republic) Martin Homola

8 November 2008; 13:00	Sweden	1-4 (0-0, 1-0, 0-4)	Czech Republic	Helsinki Halli, Helsinki; Attendance: 4,740

Game reference

Jonas Gustavsson
Goalies
Miroslav Kopriva
Referees:
(Finland) Tom Laaksonen
(Finland) Jari Levonen
Linesmen:
(Finland) Antti Orelma
(Finland) Sakari Suominen

35:58 – Martin Thörnberg (Mika Hannula, Tony Mårtensson)	1-0
	1-1	42:19 – Miloslav Horava (Peter Vampola)
	1-2	46:43 – Zbynek Irgl (Petr Cajánek, Karel Rachunek)
	1-3	55:06 – Václav Nedorost (Miroslav Blaták, Karel Rachunek) (PP)
	1-4	5+:17 – Petr Cajánek (Leos Cermák)

6 min
Penalties
6 min
6
Shots
25

8 November 2008; 15:30	Finland	2-6 (1-2, 0-1, 1-3)	Russia	Helsinki Halli, Helsinki; Attendance: 12,000

Game reference

Petri Vehanen
Goalies
Aleksandr Eremenko
Referees:
(Sweden) Niklas Persson
(Sweden) Marcus Vinnerborg
Linesmen:
(Finland) Mika Tarvo
(Finland) Jussi Terho

	0-1	12:26 – Aleksandr Radulov (Oleg Saprykin)
13:36 – Petteri Nummelin (Esa Pirnes, Sami Kapanen)	1-1
	1-2	15:13 – Aleksei Mikhnov (Konstantin Korneev, Aleksandr Eremenko)
	1-3	22:06 – Denis Kulyash
	1-4	49:04 – Aleksandr Radulov (Aleksei Mikhnov, Konstantin Gorovikov)
	1-5	52:26 – Sergei Zinoviev (Danis Zaripov, Aleksei Morozov) (PP)
55:04 – Juha-Pekka Hytönen	2-5
	2-6	59:03 – Aleksei Tereshchenko (Aleksandr Perezhogin, Sergei Mozyakin)

8 min
Penalties
16 min
30
Shots
34

9 November 2008; 14:00	Russia	1-0 GWS (0–0, 0–0, 0–0) (OT: 0–0) (SO: 1-0)	Czech Republic	Helsinki Halli, Helsinki; Attendance: 4,212

Game reference
Konstantin Barulin	Goalies	Miroslav Kopriva	Referees: (Finland) Aleksi Rantala (Finland) Jyri Rönn; Linesmen: (Finland) Stefan Fonselius (Finland) Pasi Nieminen
Zaripov; But	Shootout	Klepis (miss); Marek (miss)	Referees: (Finland) Aleksi Rantala (Finland) Jyri Rönn; Linesmen: (Finland) Stefan Fonselius (Finland) Pasi Nieminen
16 min	Penalties	14 min	Referees: (Finland) Aleksi Rantala (Finland) Jyri Rönn; Linesmen: (Finland) Stefan Fonselius (Finland) Pasi Nieminen
19	Shots	28	Referees: (Finland) Aleksi Rantala (Finland) Jyri Rönn; Linesmen: (Finland) Stefan Fonselius (Finland) Pasi Nieminen

9 November 2008; 18:30	Finland	0-2 (0-0, 0-1, 0-1)	Sweden	Helsinki Halli, Helsinki; Attendance: 10,939

Game reference
Juuso Riksman	Goalies	Johan Holmqvist	Referees: (Russia) Konstantin Olenin (Russia) Aleksei Ravodin; Linesmen: (Finland) Antti Orelma (Finland) Sakari Suominen
0-1 / 38:39 – Oscar Hedman (Dick Axelsson, Marcus Nilson) (PP); 0-2 / 43:03 – Mika Hannula (Dick Tärnström)			Referees: (Russia) Konstantin Olenin (Russia) Aleksei Ravodin; Linesmen: (Finland) Antti Orelma (Finland) Sakari Suominen
14 min	Penalties	12 min	Referees: (Russia) Konstantin Olenin (Russia) Aleksei Ravodin; Linesmen: (Finland) Antti Orelma (Finland) Sakari Suominen
31	Shots	21	Referees: (Russia) Konstantin Olenin (Russia) Aleksei Ravodin; Linesmen: (Finland) Antti Orelma (Finland) Sakari Suominen

== Scoring leaders ==
Pos	Player	Country	GP	G	A	Pts	+/−	PIM	POS
1	Alexei Mikhnov	Russia	3	3	0	3	+3	0	LW
2	Petteri Nummelin	Finland	3	2	1	3	+1	2	RD
3	Alexander Radulov	Russia	3	1	1	2	+3	0	CE
4	Miloslav Hořava	Czech Republic	3	1	1	2	+1	0	RW
5	Danis Zaripov	Russia	3	1	1	2	0	0	LW

GP = Games played; G = Goals; A = Assists; Pts = Points; +/− = Plus/minus; PIM = Penalties in minutes; POS = Position
Source: swehockey

== Goaltending leaders ==
Pos	Player	Country	TOI	GA	GAA	Sv%	SO
1	Johan Holmqvist	Sweden	118:14	1	0.51	98.39	1
2	Miroslav Kopřiva	Czech Republic	125:01	2	0.96	95.65	0
3	Alexander Yeryomenko	Russia	120:00	2	1.00	95.65	1
4	Juuso Riksman	Finland	122:49	5	2.44	90.00	0

TOI = Time on ice (minutes:seconds); SA = Shots against; GA = Goals against; GAA = Goals Against Average; Sv% = Save percentage; SO = Shutouts
Source: swehockey

== Tournament awards ==
The tournament directorate named the following players in the tournament 2008:

- Best Player: (Russia) Aleksei Mikhnov
- Best goalkeeper: (Sweden) Johan Holmqvist
- Best defenceman: (Finland) Petteri Nummelin
- Best forward: (Russia) Aleksandr Radulov

Media All-Star Team:

- Goaltender: (Czech Republic) Miroslav Kopriva
- Defence: (Russia) Vitali Proshkin, (Finland) Petteri Nummelin
- Forwards: (Russia) Aleksei Mikhnov, (Russia) Sergei Zinoviev, (Russia) Aleksandr Radulov
