= 1997 Karjala Tournament =

Tournament details
- Host country: Finland
- City: Helsinki
- Venue: 1 (in 1 host city)
- Dates: 6-9 November 1997
- Teams: 4

Final positions
- Champions: Sweden (2nd title)
- Runners-up: Czech Republic
- Third place: Russia
- Fourth place: Finland

Tournament statistics
- Games played: 6
- Goals scored: 25 (4.17 per game)
- Attendance: 37,300 (6,217 per game)
- Scoring leader: (Sweden) Mikael Johansson (5 points)

The 1997 Karjala Tournament was played between 6 and 9 November 1997. The Czech Republic, Finland, Sweden and Russia played a round-robin for a total of three games per team and six games in total. All of the games were played in Hartwall Areena, Helsinki, Finland. Sweden won the tournament. The tournament was part of the 1997–98 Euro Hockey Tour.

== Standings ==
Pos	Team	Pld	W	D	L	GF	GA	GD	Pts
1	Sweden	3	3	0	0	9	3	+6	6
2	Czech Republic	3	1	0	2	5	4	+1	2
3	Russia	3	1	0	2	4	6	−2	2
4	Finland	3	1	0	2	7	12	−5	2

Source: hokej

== Games ==
All times are local. Helsinki – (Eastern European Time – UTC+2)

7 November 1997; 17:00	Sweden	1-0 (1-0, 0-0, 0-0)	Czech Republic	Hartwall Areena, Helsinki; Attendance: 800

Game reference
Tommy Söderström	Goalies	Roman Čechmánek
Svensson – 06:00 / 1-0

7 November 1997; 18:00	Finland	3-2 (2-1, 1-1, 0-0)	Russia	Hartwall Areena, Helsinki; Attendance: 6,000

Game reference

Jarmo Myllys
Goalies
Yegor Podomatsky

Pirjetä – 04:00	1-0
Riihijärvi – 08:00	2-0
	2-1	15:00 – Ivanov
Sormunen – 35:00	3-1
	3-2	40:00 – Barkov

9 November 1997; 15:00	Russia	1-3 (1-1, 0-1, 0-1)	Sweden	Hartwall Areena, Helsinki; Attendance: 4,200

Game reference

Yegor Podomatsky
Goalies
Tommy Söderström

Prokhorov – 05:00	1-0
	1-1	20:00 – Mikael Johansson
	1-2	26:00 – Mertzig
	1-3	47:00 – Kjellberg

9 November 1997; 18:30	Finland	2-5 (1-3, 1-1, 0-1)	Czech Republic	Hartwall Areena, Helsinki; Attendance: 10,200

Game reference

Jarmo Myllys
Goalies
Milan Hnilička

Rintanen – 07:00	1-0
Nieminen – 36:00	2-0
	2-1	12:00 – Moravec
	2-2	20:00 – Čaloun
	2-3	29:00 – Alinč
	2-4	39:00 – Nedved
	2-5	48:00 – Procházka

10 November 1997; 15:00	Czech Republic	0-1 (0-0, 0-0, 0-1)	Russia	Hartwall Areena, Helsinki; Attendance: 4,800

Game reference
Milan Hnilička	Goalies	Oleg Shevtsov
0-1 / 42:00 – Sarmatin

10 November 1997; 18:30	Finland	2-5 (1-1, 0-2, 1-2)	Sweden	Hartwall Areena, Helsinki; Attendance: 11,300

Game reference

Markus Ketterer
Goalies
Tommy Söderström

	0-1	04:00 – Mikael Johansson
Nurminen – 13:00	1-1
	1-2	31:00 – Mikael Johansson
	1-3	33:00 – Falk
	1-4	45:00 – Dahlen
Nummelin – 56:00	2-4
	2-5	59:00 – Carlsson

== Scoring leaders ==
Pos	Player	Country	GP	G	A	Pts	+/−	PIM	POS
1	Mikael Johansson	Sweden	3	2	3	5	+2	0	F
2	Patric Kjellberg	Sweden	3	2	1	3	+1	0	F
3	Mika Nieminen	Finland	3	1	2	3	-1	0	F
4	Kimmo Rintanen	Finland	3	1	2	3	0	0	F
5	David Moravec	Czech Republic	3	0	3	3	0	2	F

GP = Games played; G = Goals; A = Assists; Pts = Points; +/− = Plus/minus; PIM = Penalties in minutes; POS = Position
Source: quanthockey

== Goaltending leaders ==
Pos	Player	Country	TOI	GA	GAA	Sv%	SO
1	Tommy Söderström	Sweden	180:00	3	X.XX	96.63	0
2	Milan Hnilička	Czech Republic	118:00	2	X.XX	96.08	0
2	Yegor Podomatsky	Russia	119:00	4	X.XX	94.34	0
4	Martin Prusek	Czech Republic	60:00	2	X.XX	93.75	0
5	Jarmo Myllys	Finland	119:00	5	X.XX	88.00	0
6	Oleg Shevtsov	Russia	60:00	5	X.XX	84.21	0
7	Markus Ketterer	Finland	60:00	5	X.XX	82.14	0

TOI = Time on ice (minutes:seconds); SA = Shots against; GA = Goals against; GAA = Goals Against Average; Sv% = Save percentage; SO = Shutouts
Source: swehockey

== Tournament awards ==
The tournament directorate named the following players in the tournament 1997:

Media All-Star Team A:

- Goaltender: (Sweden) Tommy Söderström
- Defence: (Sweden) Magnus Svensson, (Finland) Petteri Nummelin
- Forwards: (Czech Republic) Jan Čaloun, (Sweden) Patric Kjellberg, (Finland) Kimmo Rintanen

Media All-Star Team B:

- Goaltender: (Finland) Jarmo Myllys
- Defence: (Czech Republic) Jaroslav Špaček, (Russia) Dmitry Yerofeyev
- Forwards: (Sweden) Mikael Johansson, (Finland) Mika Nieminen, (Russia) Vitali Prokhorov
