= 2012 Karjala Tournament =

2012 Karjala Tournament (Euro Hockey Games)
Tournament details
- Host countries: Finland; Czechia
- Cities: Turku; Prague
- Venues: 2 (in 2 host cities)
- Dates: 7–10 November 2012
- Teams: 4

Final positions
- Champions: Czech Republic (1st title)
- Runners-up: Finland
- Third place: Russia
- Fourth place: Sweden

Tournament statistics
- Games played: 6
- Goals scored: 20 (3.33 per game)
- Attendance: 49,723 (8,287 per game)
- Scoring leader(s): (Sweden) Carl Söderberg (Czech Republic) Jiří Tlustý (2 points)

The 2012 Karjala Tournament was played between 7 and 10 November 2012. The Czech Republic, Finland, Sweden and Russia played a round-robin for a total of three games per team and six games in total. Five of the matches were played in the Turkuhalli in Turku, Finland, and one match in the TipSport Arena in Prague, Czech Republic. The tournament was won by Czech Republic for the first time. The tournament was part of 2012–13 Euro Hockey Tour.

== Standings ==
Pos	Team	Pld	W	OTW	OTL	L	GF	GA	GD	Pts
1	Czech Republic	3	3	0	0	0	6	2	+4	9
2	Finland	3	1	1	0	1	5	3	+2	5
3	Russia	3	1	0	1	1	5	6	−1	4
4	Sweden	3	0	0	0	3	4	9	−5	0

Source: swehockey

== Games ==
All times are local. Turku – (Eastern European Time – UTC+2) Prague – (Central European Time – UTC+1)

7 November 2012; 18:00	Czech Republic	3–1 (0–0, 0–0, 3–1)	Sweden	TipSport Arena, Prague; Attendance: 5,893

Game reference

Alexander Salák
Goalies
Gustaf Wesslau
Referees:
(Russia) Konstantin Olenin
(Russia) Alexey Ravodin

T. Plekanec (P. Nedvěd) – 40:37	1–0
M. Vondrka (P. Koukal, J. Petružálek) – 48:56	2–0
J. Tlustý (J. Petružálek, M. Židlický) (PP) – 52:48	3–0
	3–1	58:58 – C. Söderberg (N. Burström, S. Kronwall) (PP)

20 min
Penalties
14 min
29
Shots
33

7 November 2012; 18:30	Russia	1–2 GWS (0–0, 1–0, 0–1) (OT 0–0) (SO: 0–1)	Finland	Turkuhalli, Turku; Attendance: 9,538

Game reference
Konstantin Barulin	Goalies	Pekka Rinne	Referees: (Sweden) Morgan Johansson (Sweden) Marcus Vinnerborg; Linesmen: (Finland) Joonas Saha (Finland) Masi Puolakka
A. Anisimov (N. Zherdev, E. Dadonov) – 20:31 / 1–0; / 1–1 / 50:47 – T. Laine (P. Kontiola, J. Joensuu)			Referees: (Sweden) Morgan Johansson (Sweden) Marcus Vinnerborg; Linesmen: (Finland) Joonas Saha (Finland) Masi Puolakka
	Shootout	Petteri Nummelin	Referees: (Sweden) Morgan Johansson (Sweden) Marcus Vinnerborg; Linesmen: (Finland) Joonas Saha (Finland) Masi Puolakka
8 min	Penalties	4 min	Referees: (Sweden) Morgan Johansson (Sweden) Marcus Vinnerborg; Linesmen: (Finland) Joonas Saha (Finland) Masi Puolakka
35	Shots	36	Referees: (Sweden) Morgan Johansson (Sweden) Marcus Vinnerborg; Linesmen: (Finland) Joonas Saha (Finland) Masi Puolakka

9 November 2012; 15:00	Sweden	2–3 (1–2, 1–0, 0–1)	Russia	Turkuhalli, Turku; Attendance: 4,365

Game reference

Johan Holmqvist
Goalies
Sergei Bobrovsky
Referees:
(Finland) Stefan Fonselius
(Finland) Jari Levonen
Linesmen:
(Finland) Markus Hägerström
(Finland) Juha Suoraniemi

	0–1	02:20 – E. Averin (D. Kazionov)
M. Thörnberg (R. Gynge, M. Backlund) (PP) – 05:07	1–1
	1–2	11:02 – V. Shipachyov (E. Kuznetsov, N. Zherdev)
T. Mårtensson (O. Fantenberg, M. Thörnberg) – 28:22	2–2
	2–3	42:38 – V. Tikhonov (I. Makarov, M. Chudinov)

6 min
Penalties
37 min
36
Shots
14

9 November 2012; 18:30	Finland	0–1 (0–1, 0–0, 0–0)	Czech Republic	Turkuhalli, Turku; Attendance: 10,238

Game reference
Tuukka Rask	Goalies	Ondřej Pavelec	Referees: (Sweden) Morgan Johansson (Sweden) Marcus Vinnerborg; Linesmen: (Finland) Iikka Kiilunen (Finland) Jari Korteniemi
0–1 / 17:48 – P. Nedvěd (P. Koukal)			Referees: (Sweden) Morgan Johansson (Sweden) Marcus Vinnerborg; Linesmen: (Finland) Iikka Kiilunen (Finland) Jari Korteniemi
2 min	Penalties	6 min	Referees: (Sweden) Morgan Johansson (Sweden) Marcus Vinnerborg; Linesmen: (Finland) Iikka Kiilunen (Finland) Jari Korteniemi
27	Shots	17	Referees: (Sweden) Morgan Johansson (Sweden) Marcus Vinnerborg; Linesmen: (Finland) Iikka Kiilunen (Finland) Jari Korteniemi

10 November 2012; 13:00	Czech Republic	2–1 (2–0, 0–1, 0–0)	Russia	Turkuhalli, Turku; Attendance: 7,869

Game reference

Ondřej Pavelec
Goalies
Konstantin Barulin
Referees:
(Finland) Antti Boman
(Finland) Mikko Kaukokari
Linesmen:
(Finland) Jani Pesonen
(Finland) Hannu Sormunen

Z. Irgl (PP) – 08:45	1–0
J. Tlustý (Z. Irgl) (PP) – 17:38	2–0
	2–1	33:43 – E. Medvedev (I. Nikulin, D. Kokarev) (PP)

12 min
Penalties
6 min
26
Shots
38

10 November 2012; 16:30	Finland	3–1 (1–0, 1–1, 1–0)	Sweden	Turkuhalli, Turku; Attendance: 11,820

Game reference

Pekka Rinne
Goalies
Gustaf Wesslau
Referees:
(Russia) Antonin Jerabek
(Russia) Vladimir Sindler
Linesman:
(Finland) Sakari Suominen

S. Salminen (M. Koivu) – 03:26	1–0
	1–1	31:21 – C. Söderberg (O. Fantenberg)
J. Enlund (P. Nummelin, O. Väänänen) (PP) – 37:14	2–1
J-P Haataja (J. Lehterä, J. Enlund) (PP) – 58:32	3–1

12 min
Penalties
12 min
24
Shots
42

== Scoring leaders ==
Pos	Player	Country	GP	G	A	Pts	+/−	PIM	POS
1	Carl Söderberg	Sweden	3	2	0	2	+1	6	CE
2	Jiří Tlustý	Czech Republic	3	2	0	2	+1	6	LW
3	Petr Nedvěd	Czech Republic	3	1	1	2	+2	0	CE
4	Martin Thörnberg	Sweden	3	1	1	2	+1	0	LW
5	Zbyněk Irgl	Czech Republic	3	1	1	2	0	0	RW

GP = Games played; G = Goals; A = Assists; Pts = Points; +/− = Plus/minus; PIM = Penalties in minutes; POS = Position
Source: swehockey

== Goaltending leaders ==
Pos	Player	Country	TOI	GA	GAA	Sv%	SO
1	Ondřej Pavelec	Czech Republic	120:00	1	0.50	98.46	1
2	Pekka Rinne	Finland	125:00	2	0.96	97.40	0
3	Alexander Salák	Czech Republic	120:00	1	1.00	96.97	0
4	Konstantin Barulin	Russia	124:25	3	1.45	95.08	0
5	Gustaf Wesslau	Sweden	118:41	6	3.03	88.68	0

TOI = Time on ice (minutes:seconds); SA = Shots against; GA = Goals against; GAA = Goals Against Average; Sv% = Save percentage; SO = Shutouts
Source: swehockey

== Tournament awards ==
The tournament directorate named the following players in the tournament 2012:

- Best goalkeeper: (Czech Republic) Ondrej Pavelec
- Best defenceman: (Sweden) Staffan Kronwall
- Best forward: (Finland) Sakari Salminen

Media All-Star Team:

- Goaltender: (Czech Republic) Ondrej Pavelec
- Defence: (Russia) Ilya Nikulin, (Finland) Petteri Nummelin
- Forwards: (Czech Republic) Petr Nedved, (Finland) Mikko Koivu, (Finland) Sakari Salminen
