= 2014–15 Euro Hockey Tour =

Tournament details
- Dates: 6 November 2014 – 25 April 2015
- Teams: 4

Final positions
- Champions: Sweden (3rd title)
- Runners-up: Finland
- Third place: Czech Republic
- Fourth place: Russia

Tournament statistics
- Games played: 24
- Goals scored: 124 (5.17 per game)
- Attendance: 194,208 (8,092 per game)
- Scoring leader: (Sweden) Patrik Hersley (8 points)

The 2014–15 Euro Hockey Tour was the 19th season of Euro Hockey Tour. It started on 6 November 2014 and ended on 25 April 2015. A total of 24 games were played, with each team playing 12 games. The season consisted of the Karjala Tournament, the Channel One Cup, and three rounds of double headers. An interrupted game between Sweden and Finland on 6 February 2015 did not count towards the final standings and was not replayed. Sweden won the tournament.

== Standings ==
Pos	Team	Pld	W	OTW	OTL	L	GF	GA	GD	Pts
1	Sweden	11	5	3	1	2	36	30	+6	22
2	Finland	11	4	2	1	4	26	24	+2	17
3	Czech Republic	12	4	1	2	5	33	31	+2	16
4	Russia	12	4	0	2	6	29	39	−10	14

Source: eurohockey

== Karjala Tournament ==
The 2014 Karjala Tournament was played from 6 to 9 November 2014, and was won by Sweden. Five of the matches were played in Helsinki, Finland, and one match in Leksand, Sweden.

Pos	Team	Pld	W	OTW	OTL	L	GF	GA	GD	Pts
1	Sweden	3	1	2	0	0	12	7	+5	7
2	Finland	3	2	0	0	1	8	6	+2	6
3	Russia	3	1	0	1	1	10	13	−3	4
4	Czech Republic	3	0	0	1	2	6	10	−4	1

Source: Swehockey

6 November 2014
Finland	2–1	Czech Republic
Sweden	5–4 (GWS)	Russia
8 November 2014
Czech Republic	3–4 (GWS)	Sweden
Sweden	2–6	Czech Republic
9 November 2014
Russia	4–2	Czech Republic
Finland	0–3	Sweden

== Channel One Cup ==
The 2014 Channel One Cup was played from 18 to 21 December 2014, and was won by Russia. Five of the matches were played in Sochi, Russia, and one match in Prague, Czech Republic.

Pos	Team	Pld	W	OTW	OTL	L	GF	GA	GD	Pts
1	Russia	3	3	0	0	0	8	4	+4	9
2	Finland	3	0	2	0	1	6	6	0	4
3	Sweden	3	1	0	1	1	10	10	0	4
4	Czech Republic	3	0	0	1	2	8	12	−4	1

Source: eurohockey

18 December 2014
Czech Republic	4–6	Sweden
Russia	2–0	Finland
20 December 2014
Sweden	2–3	Russia
Finland	3–2 (GWS)	Czech Republic
21 December 2014
Russia	3–2	Czech Republic
Finland	3–2 (GWS)	Sweden

== Double headers, 5–8 February 2015 ==
The first game between Sweden and Finland played on 6 February in Västerås was interrupted during the second period and was not continued. The interrupted game does not count as a national team game.

=== Results ===
All games are UTC+1.

5 February 2015; 18:30	Czech Republic	3–0 (1–0, 2–0, 0–0)	Russia	KV Arena, Karlovy Vary; Attendance: 5,985

Game reference

6 February 2015; 19:00	Sweden	0–1 (0–1)	Finland	ABB Arena Nord, Västerås; Attendance: 4,900

Game reference

Game was interrupted at 22:34 due to broken ice and was not continued.

7 February 2015; 13:00	Czech Republic	4–3 (2–2, 1–0, 1–1)	Russia	O2 Arena, Prague; Attendance: 16,452

Game reference

8 February 2015; 15:00	Sweden	3–2 (2–1, 1–1, 0–0)	Finland	Ericsson Globe, Stockholm; Attendance: 12,496

Game reference

== Double headers, 16–19 April 2015 ==
=== Results ===
The games played in Sweden are UTC+2 and the games played in Finland are UTC+3.

16 April 2015; 18:30	Finland	3–0 (0–0, 1–0, 2–0)	Russia	Hakametsä, Tampere; Attendance: 7,131

Game reference

17 April 2015; 19:00	Sweden	1–4 (0–1, 0–0, 1–3)	Czech Republic	T3 Center, Umeå; Attendance: 4,520

Game reference

18 April 2015; 14:00	Finland	4–2 (2–1, 2–0, 0–1)	Russia	Hartwall Arena, Helsinki; Attendance: 7,661

Game reference

19 April 2015; 15:00	Sweden	2–1 (1–1, 1–0, 0–0)	Czech Republic	E.ON Arena, Timrå; Attendance: 5,028

Game reference

== Double headers, 22–25 April 2015 ==
=== Results ===
The games played in Czech Republic are UTC+2 and the games played in Russia are UTC+3.

22 April 2015; 17:30	Czech Republic	4–1 (1–1, 1–0, 2–0)	Finland	Zimní stadion Znojmo, Znojmo; Attendance: 4,800

Game reference

24 April 2015; 18:00	Czech Republic	3–2 GWS (0–1, 1–0, 1–1) (OT 0–0) (SO: 1–0)	Finland	Kajot Arena, Brno; Attendance: 7,200

Game reference

24 April 2015; 19:30	Russia	4–5 (0–4, 2–1, 2–0)	Sweden	Mytishchi Arena, Moscow; Attendance: 10,300

Game reference

25 April 2015; 17:00	Russia	2–3 OT (0–1, 1–0, 1–1) (OT 0–1)	Sweden	Mytishchi Arena, Moscow; Attendance: 6,782

Game reference
