= 2015–16 Euro Hockey Tour =

Tournament details
- Dates: 5 November 2015 – 30 April 2016
- Teams: 4

Final positions
- Champions: Sweden (4th title)
- Runners-up: Finland
- Third place: Czech Republic
- Fourth place: Russia

Tournament statistics
- Games played: 24
- Goals scored: 132 (5.5 per game)
- Attendance: 184,080 (7,670 per game)
- Scoring leader: (Russia) Vadim Shipachyov (10 points)

The 2015–16 Euro Hockey Tour was the 20th season of Euro Hockey Tour. It started on 5 November 2015 and lasted until 30 April 2016. It consisted of Karjala Cup, Channel One Cup and Euro Hockey Tour Games (played in February and April 2016). Sweden won the tournament.

== Standings ==
Pos	Team	Pld	W	OTW	OTL	L	GF	GA	GD	Pts
1	Sweden	12	7	1	0	4	38	33	+5	23
2	Finland	12	6	0	1	5	27	29	−2	19
3	Czech Republic	12	4	2	0	6	32	37	−5	16
4	Russia	12	4	0	2	6	35	33	+2	14

Source: eurohockey

== Karjala Tournament ==
The 2015 Karjala Tournament was played from 5 to 8 November 2015. Five of the matches were played in Helsinki, Finland, and one match in Örnsköldsvik, Sweden. Tournament was won by Sweden.

Pos	Team	Pld	W	OTW	OTL	L	GF	GA	GD	Pts
1	Sweden	3	2	0	0	1	12	10	+2	6
2	Finland	3	2	0	0	1	6	5	+1	6
3	Russia	3	1	0	1	1	10	9	+1	4
4	Czech Republic	3	0	1	0	2	7	11	−4	2

Source: eurohockey

5 November 2015
Finland	2–1	Russia
Sweden	6–2	Czech Republic
7 November 2015
Russia	6–3	Sweden
Czech Republic	1–2	Finland
8 November 2015
Russia	3–4 (GWS)	Czech Republic
Finland	2–3	Sweden

== Channel One Cup ==
The 2015 Channel One Cup was played from 17 to 20 December 2015. Five of the matches were played in Moscow, Russia, and one match in Prague, Czech Republic. Tournament was won by Czech Republic.

Pos	Team	Pld	W	OTW	OTL	L	GF	GA	GD	Pts
1	Czech Republic	3	2	0	0	1	7	6	+1	6
2	Sweden	3	1	1	0	1	7	5	+2	5
3	Finland	3	1	0	1	1	5	10	−5	4
4	Russia	3	1	0	0	2	11	9	+2	3

Source: eurohockey

17 December 2015
Czech Republic	0–3	Finland
Russia	1–4	Sweden
19 December 2015
Finland	1–8	Russia
Sweden	1–3	Czech Republic
20 December 2015
Russia	2–4	Czech Republic
Finland	1–2 (GWS)	Sweden
