= 2007–08 Euro Hockey Tour =

Tournament details
- Dates: 8 November 2007 – 20 April 2008
- Teams: 4

Final positions
- Champions: Russia (3rd title)
- Runners-up: Finland
- Third place: Czech Republic
- Fourth place: Sweden

Tournament statistics
- Games played: 24
- Goals scored: 128 (5.33 per game)
- Attendance: 179,497 (7,479 per game)
- Scoring leader: (Russia) Fedor Fedorov (10 points)

2007–08 Euro Hockey Tour was the 12th edition of Euro Hockey Tour. There were four participating teams: Czech Republic, Finland, Russia and Sweden.

== Format ==
The tournament consisted of four stages: Karjala Tournament in Finland, Channel One Cup in Russia, LG Hockey Games in Sweden and Czech Hockey Games in the Czech Republic. The intervals between stages are usually from 1 month to 3 months. In each phase teams played six games.

== Standings ==
Pos	Team	Pld	W	OTW	OTL	L	GF	GA	GD	Pts
1	Russia	12	10	0	0	2	41	18	+23	30
2	Finland	12	5	1	1	5	27	31	−4	18
3	Czech Republic	12	4	1	1	6	33	44	−11	15
4	Sweden	12	3	0	0	9	27	35	−8	9

== Karjala Tournament ==
The tournament was played between 8–11 November 2007. Five of the matches were played in Helsinki, Finland and one match in Jönköping, Sweden. The tournament was won by Russia.

Pos	Team	Pld	W	OTW	OTL	L	GF	GA	GD	Pts
1	Russia	3	2	0	0	1	8	4	+4	6
2	Sweden	3	2	0	0	1	6	5	+1	6
3	Czech Republic	3	1	0	0	2	6	10	−4	3
4	Finland	3	1	0	0	2	4	5	−1	3

Source: flashscore
- Note:Russia stand first, because they won against Sweden.

8 November 2007
Finland	2–3	Czech Republic
Sweden	1–3	Russia
10 November 2007
Sweden	4–2	Czech Republic
Finland	2–1	Russia
11 November 2007
Czech Republic	1–4	Russia
Finland	0-1	Sweden

== Channel One Cup ==
The tournament was played between 13–17 December 2007. Five of the matches were played in Moscow, Russia and one match in Prague, Czech Republic. The tournament was won by Russia.

Pos	Team	Pld	W	OTW	OTL	L	GF	GA	GD	Pts
1	Russia	3	3	0	0	0	11	2	+9	9
2	Finland	3	1	1	0	1	10	11	−1	5
3	Czech Republic	3	1	0	1	1	11	15	−4	4
4	Sweden	3	0	0	0	3	6	10	−4	0

Source: eurohockey

13 December 2007
Czech Republic	5–4	Sweden
Russia	4–1	Finland
15 December 2007
Russia	2–0	Sweden
Czech Republic	5–6 (GWS)	Finland
16 December 2007
Russia	5–1	Czech Republic
Sweden	2-3	Finland

== LG Hockey Games ==
The tournament was played between 7–10 February 2008. Five of the matches were played in Stockholm, Sweden and one match in Tampere, Finland. The tournament was won by Russia.

Pos	Team	Pld	W	OTW	SOW	OTL	SOL	L	GF	GA	GD	Pts
1	Russia	3	2	0	0	0	0	1	11	7	+4	6
2	Finland	3	2	0	0	0	0	1	8	7	+1	6
3	Sweden	3	1	0	0	0	0	2	8	8	0	3
4	Czech Republic	3	1	0	0	0	0	2	7	12	−5	3

Source: swehockey

7 February 2008
Finland	6–1	Czech Republic
Sweden	3–4	Russia
9 February 2008
Finland	0–5	Russia
Sweden	4–2	Czech Republic
10 February 2008
Czech Republic	4–2	Russia
Sweden	1-2	Finland

== Czech Hockey Games ==
The tournament was played between 17–20 April 2008. Five of the matches were played in Liberec, Czech Republic and one match in Moscow, Russia. The tournament was won by Russia.

Pos	Team	Pld	W	OTW	OTL	L	GF	GA	GD	Pts
1	Russia	3	3	0	0	0	11	5	+6	9
2	Czech Republic	3	1	1	0	1	9	7	+2	5
3	Finland	3	0	1	1	1	5	8	−3	3
4	Sweden	3	0	0	1	2	7	12	−5	1

Source: swehockey

17 April 2008
Czech Republic	5–3	Sweden
Russia	4–1	Finland
19 April 2008
Czech Republic	2–1 (GWS)	Finland
Russia	4–2	Sweden
20 April 2008
Czech Republic	2–3	Russia
Finland	3-2	Sweden
