= Karjala Tournament =

Finnish ice hockey tournament (1992–pres.)

Karjala-turnaus
- Sport: Ice hockey
- Founded: 1995
- Organising body: Euro Hockey Tour
- No. of teams: 4
- Country: Finland
- Most recent champion: Finland
- Most titles: Finland (14)

The Finnish Euro Hockey Tour is an annual ice hockey event held in Finland.

== History ==
The tournament started in 1992 as the Sauna Cup. In December 1995, the tournament was played as Christmas Cup at the same time as the Izvestija Trophy tournament, just before the Christmas holiday, causing Russia to send a reserve team to the Christmas Cup.

In 1996, the tournament was moved to early November under the sponsorship of Karjala under the name Karjala Tournament. It became part of the annual Euro Hockey Tour (EHT), in which the national teams of Czech Republic, Finland, Russia and Sweden compete in a series of tournaments. The event has continued to be held every November, with the exception of 2001 when the tournament was pushed back to April 2002.

In 2025, the sponsorship deal with Hartwall and Karjala were terminated, and the tournament was officially named as Suomen EHT-turnaus, translating to Finnish Euro Hockey Tour in autumn 2025.

In 2026 Finnish Ice Hockey Association and NOCCO announce that the Finnish men's national team's home tournament will be played from November 5th to 8th, 2026 at Veikkaus Arena in Helsinki under the name NOCCO Hockey Games.

== Results ==
Final standings in each event are determined in a round-robin tournament. If teams are tied in points, the standing is determined by the result of the game between the tied teams.

Year	Winner	Runner-up	3rd place	4th place	EHT-Season
1992 (Note: In 1992, the tournament was known as Sauna Cup.)	CIS (Note: CIS is a team of Commonwealth of Independent States from the former Soviet Union.)	Czechoslovakia	United States	Finland	
1995 (Note: In 1995, the tournament was known as Christmas Cup.)	Sweden	Finland	France	Czech Republic	
Part of the Euro Hockey Tour
1996 (Note: In 1996 to 2024, the tournament was known as Karjala Tournament.)	Finland	Sweden	Russia	Czech Republic	1996–97
1997	Sweden	Czech Republic	Russia	Finland	1997–98
1998	Finland	Russia	Czech Republic	Sweden	1998–99
1999	Finland	Russia	Czech Republic	Sweden	1999–00
2000	Finland	Sweden	Russia	Czech Republic	2000–01
2002 (April) (Note: April 2002 tournament was part of the 2001–02 Euro Hockey Tour.)	Finland	Russia	Sweden	Czech Republic	2001–02
2002 (November) (Note: November 2002 tournament was part of the 2002–03 Euro Hockey Tour.)	Finland	Czech Republic	Sweden	Russia	2002–03
2003	Finland	Czech Republic	Russia	Sweden	2003–04
2004	Finland	Sweden	Czech Republic	Russia	2004–05
2005	Finland	Sweden	Russia	Czech Republic	2005–06
2006	Russia	Czech Republic	Sweden	Finland	2006–07
2007	Russia	Sweden	Czech Republic	Finland	2007–08
2008	Russia	Czech Republic	Sweden	Finland	2008–09
2009	Russia	Finland	Sweden	Czech Republic	2009–10
2010	Finland	Russia	Sweden	Czech Republic	2010–11
2011	Russia	Finland	Czech Republic	Sweden	2011–12
2012	Czech Republic	Finland	Russia	Sweden	2012–13
2013	Finland	Russia	Sweden	Czech Republic	2013–14
2014	Sweden	Finland	Russia	Czech Republic	2014–15
2015	Sweden	Finland	Russia	Czech Republic	2015–16
2016	Russia	Czech Republic	Finland	Sweden	2016–17
2017	Finland	Russia	Sweden	Canada	2017–18
2018	Russia	Finland	Czech Republic	Sweden	2018–19
2019	Czech Republic	Finland	Russia	Sweden	2019–20
2020	Russia	Czech Republic	Finland	Sweden	2020–21
2021	Sweden	Finland	Russia	Czech Republic	2021–22
2022	Sweden	Switzerland	Czech Republic	Finland	2022–23
2023	Czech Republic	Sweden	Finland	Switzerland	2023–24
2024	Finland	Czech Republic	Switzerland	Sweden	2024–25
2025 (Note: In 2025, the tournament was known as Suomen EHT-turnaus.)	Sweden	Czech Republic	Finland	Switzerland	2025–26
2026 (Note: In 2026, the tournament known as NOCCO Hockey Games.)	Finland	Sweden	Czech Republic	Switzerland	2026–27

== Medal table ==
Pos	Team	Gold	Silver	Bronze	Medals
1	Finland	14	9	4	27
2	CIS; Russia	9	6	10	25
3	Sweden	7	7	8	22
4	Czechoslovakia; Czech Republic	3	10	8	21
5	Switzerland	0	1	1	2
6	France	0	0	1	1
6	United States	0	0	1	1

== History of broadcasting channels in Finland ==
Channels
Yle TV2
MTV3 / MTV Max / MTV Urheilu
Ruutu+ Urheilu 1
TV5 / HBO Max / Dplay
