= 2011–12 Euro Hockey Tour =

Tournament details
- Venues: 8 (in 8 host cities)
- Dates: 10 November 2011 – 29 April 2012
- Teams: 4

Final positions
- Champions: Czech Republic (2nd title)
- Runners-up: Finland
- Third place: Russia
- Fourth place: Sweden

Tournament statistics
- Games played: 24
- Goals scored: 115 (4.79 per game)
- Attendance: 198,557 (8,273 per game)
- Scoring leader: (Russia) Alexander Radulov (9 points)

The 2011–12 Euro Hockey Tour was the 16th season of Euro Hockey Tour. It started on 10 November 2011 and ended on 29 April 2012. A total of 24 games were played, with each team playing 12 games. The season consisted of the Karjala Tournament, the Channel One Cup, the Oddset Hockey Games, and the Kajotbet Hockey Games. The Czech Republic took their first Euro Hockey Tour gold medal since 1997–98, and thus received the largest prize money of €75,000.

== Format ==
The tournament consisted of four stages: Czech Hockey Games in Czech Republic, Karjala Tournament in Finland, Channel One Cup in Russia and LG Hockey Games in Sweden. The intervals between stages are usually from 1 month to 3 months. In each phase teams played three games.

== Standings ==
Pos	Team	Pld	W	OTW	OTL	L	GF	GA	GD	Pts
1	Czech Republic	12	5	2	1	4	31	29	+2	20
2	Finland	12	5	1	1	5	30	25	+5	18
3	Russia	12	5	1	1	5	24	25	−1	18
4	Sweden	12	5	0	1	6	30	36	−6	16

Source: eurohockey
- EHT Champions received €75,000 prize money.
- EHT Runner ups Received €30,000 prize money.
- EHT Third place Received €15,000 prize money.

== Karjala Tournament ==
The 2011 Karjala Tournament was played from 10 to 13 November 2011, and was won by Russia. Five of the matches were played in Helsinki, Finland, and one match in Örnsköldsvik, Sweden.

Pos	Team	Pld	W	OTW	OTL	L	GF	GA	GD	Pts
1	Russia	3	2	1	0	0	8	3	+5	8
2	Finland	3	1	0	1	1	8	6	+2	4
3	Czech Republic	3	1	0	0	2	6	8	−2	3
4	Sweden	3	1	0	0	2	7	12	−5	3

Source: eurohockey

10 November 2011
Russia	2–1 (GWS)	Finland
Sweden	2–5	Czech Republic
12 November 2011
Sweden	1–4	Russia
Finland	4–0	Czech Republic
13 November 2011
Czech Republic	1–2	Russia
Finland	3–4	Sweden

== Channel One Cup ==
The 2011 Channel One Cup was played from 15 to 18 December 2011. Five of the matches were played in the Moscow, Russia, and one match in Chomutov, Czech Republic. The tournament was won by Sweden, who therefore recorded their first win in the Russian tournament since 1998.

Pos	Team	Pld	W	OTW	OTL	L	GF	GA	GD	Pts
1	Sweden	3	2	0	0	1	9	7	+2	6
2	Czech Republic	3	1	1	0	1	10	6	+4	5
3	Russia	3	1	0	1	1	8	8	0	4
4	Finland	3	1	0	0	2	5	11	−6	3

Source: eurohockey

15 December 2011
Czech Republic	1–2	Sweden
Finland	0–3	Russia
17 December 2011
Russia	2–4	Sweden
Czech Republic	5–1	Finland
18 December 2011
Russia	3–4 (GWS)	Czech Republic
Sweden	3–4	Finland

== Oddset Hockey Games ==
The 2012 Oddset Hockey Games were played from 9 to 12 February 2012. Five of the matches were played in Stockholm, Sweden, and one match in Helsinki, Finland. Sweden won the tournament for the second consecutive year.

Pos	Team	Pld	W	OTW	OTL	L	GF	GA	GD	Pts
1	Sweden	3	2	0	1	0	8	4	+4	7
2	Czech Republic	3	1	1	0	1	6	8	−2	5
3	Russia	3	1	0	0	2	3	8	−5	3
4	Finland	3	1	0	0	2	8	5	+3	3

Source: eurohockey

9 February 2012
Finland	0–2	Russia
Czech Republic	2–1 (GWS)	Sweden
11 February 2012
Finland	7–0	Czech Republic
Sweden	4–1	Russia
12 February 2012
Russia	0–4	Czech Republic
Sweden	3–1	Finland

== Kajotbet Hockey Games ==
The 2012 Kajotbet Hockey Games were played from 26 to 29 April 2012. Five of the matches were played in Brno, Czech Republic, and one match in Saint Petersburg, Russia. Finland won the tournament, for the fifth time in history.

Pos	Team	Pld	W	OTW	OTL	L	GF	GA	GD	Pts
1	Finland	3	2	1	0	0	9	3	+6	8
2	Czech Republic	3	2	0	1	0	9	7	+2	7
3	Russia	3	1	0	0	2	5	6	−1	3
4	Sweden	3	0	0	0	3	6	13	−7	0

Source: eurohockey

26 April 2012
Sweden	3–5	Czech Republic
Russia	0–2	Finland
28 April 2012
Czech Republic	2–3 (OT)	Finland
Russia	4–2	Sweden
29 April 2012
Finland	4–1	Sweden
Czech Republic	2–1	Russia

== Statistics ==
=== Scoring leaders ===
List shows the top skaters sorted by points, then goals. If the list exceeds 10 skaters because of a tie in points, all of the tied skaters are shown.

Player	Nation	GP	G	A	Pts	PIM	POS
Alexander Radulov	Russia	6	5	4	9	29	RW
Janne Pesonen	Finland	9	5	3	8	31	F
Petr Nedvěd	Czech Republic	9	6	1	7	10	F
Staffan Kronwall	Sweden	12	5	2	7	6	D
Tuomas Kiiskinen	Finland	5	3	3	6	0	RW
Jonas Andersson	Sweden	10	3	3	6	0	RW
Ilya Nikulin	Russia	12	1	5	6	10	D
Yevgeny Kuznetsov	Russia	9	4	1	5	4	F
Nikolai Zherdev	Russia	9	4	1	5	6	F
Zbynek Irgl	Czech Republic	9	3	2	5	4	F

GP = Games played; G = Goals; A = Assists; Pts = Points; PIM = Penalties in minutes; POS = Position
positions: F = Forward; RW = Right winger; LW = Left winger; C = Centre; D = Defenceman

Updated: 2 May 2012 19:46 UTC

=== Leading goaltenders ===
Only the top five goaltenders, based on save percentage, who have played 40% of their team's minutes, are included in this list.

Player	Nation	TOI	SA	GA	GAA	Sv%	SO

TOI = Time on ice (minutes:seconds); SA = Shots against; GA = Goals against; GAA = Goals against average; Sv% = Save percentage; SO = Shutouts

Source: [Source]

Updated: (UTC)

== Rosters ==
These tables show all skaters and goaltenders who have at least one game in the Euro Hockey Tour 2011–12. The tables show how many games they played, how many points they've scored, and their penalties in minutes. POS = Position; GP = Games played; G = Goals; A = Assists; Pts = Points; PIM = Penalties In Minutes Source: [source link]
Updated: (UTC)

=== Czech Republic ===
Player	POS	GP	G	A	P	PIM

=== Finland ===
Player	POS	GP	G	A	P	PIM

=== Russia ===
Player	POS	GP	G	A	P	PIM

=== Sweden ===
Player	POS	GP	G	A	P	PIM
