= 2002–03 Euro Hockey Tour =

Tournament details
- Dates: 5 September 2002 – 9 February 2003
- Teams: 4

Final positions
- Champions: Finland (5th title)
- Runners-up: Russia
- Third place: Czech Republic
- Fourth place: Sweden

Tournament statistics
- Games played: 24
- Goals scored: 135 (5.63 per game)
- Attendance: 168,688 (7,029 per game)
- Scoring leader: (Czech Republic) Radek Duda (8 points)

The 2002–03 Euro Hockey Tour was the seventh season of the Euro Hockey Tour. The season consisted of four tournaments, the Česká Pojišťovna Cup, Karjala Tournament, Baltica Brewery Cup, and the Sweden Hockey Games.

== Standings ==
| Pos | Team | Pld | W | OTW | OTL | L | GF | GA | GD | Pts |
|---|---|---|---|---|---|---|---|---|---|---|
| 1 | Finland | 0 | 0 | 0 | 0 | 0 | 0 | 0 | 0 | 0 |
| 2 | Russia | 0 | 0 | 0 | 0 | 0 | 0 | 0 | 0 | 0 |
| 3 | Sweden | 0 | 0 | 0 | 0 | 0 | 0 | 0 | 0 | 0 |
| 4 | Czech Republic | 0 | 0 | 0 | 0 | 0 | 0 | 0 | 0 | 0 |

Source: eurohockey

== Česká Pojišťovna Cup ==
The tournament was played between 5–8 September 2002. Five of the matches were played in Zlín, Czech Republic and one match in Karlstad, Sweden. The tournament was won by Russia.

| Pos | Team | Pld | W | OTW | OTL | L | GF | GA | GD | Pts |
|---|---|---|---|---|---|---|---|---|---|---|
| 1 | Russia | 3 | 1 | 1 | 1 | 0 | 5 | 3 | +2 | 6 |
| 2 | Czech Republic | 3 | 2 | 0 | 0 | 1 | 14 | 10 | +4 | 6 |
| 3 | Sweden | 3 | 1 | 0 | 1 | 1 | 8 | 8 | 0 | 4 |
| 4 | Finland | 3 | 0 | 1 | 0 | 2 | 3 | 9 | −6 | 2 |

Source: swehockey

5 September 2002
| Czech Republic | 1–3 | Russia |
| Sweden | 2–0 | Finland |
7 September 2002
| Sweden | 1–2 (GWS) | Russia |
| Finland | 2–7 | Czech Republic |
8 September 2002
| Russia | 0–1 (OT) | Finland |
| Czech Republic | 6-5 | Sweden |

== Karjala Tournament ==
The tournament was played between 7–10 November 2002. Five of the matches were played in Helsinki, Finland and one match in Pardubice, Czech Republic. The tournament was won by Finland.

| Pos | Team | Pld | W | OTW | OTL | L | GF | GA | GD | Pts |
|---|---|---|---|---|---|---|---|---|---|---|
| 1 | Finland | 3 | 3 | 0 | 0 | 0 | 12 | 3 | +9 | 9 |
| 2 | Czech Republic | 3 | 1 | 0 | 1 | 1 | 8 | 8 | 0 | 4 |
| 3 | Sweden | 3 | 1 | 0 | 0 | 2 | 8 | 11 | −3 | 3 |
| 4 | Russia | 3 | 0 | 1 | 0 | 2 | 5 | 11 | −6 | 2 |

Source: flashscore

7 November 2002
| Czech Republic | 5–2 | Sweden |
| Finland | 5–0 | Russia |
9 November 2002
| Russia | 1–3 | Sweden |
| Finland | 2–0 | Czech Republic |
10 November 2002
| Russia | 4–3 (OT) | Czech Republic |
| Finland | 5-3 | Sweden |

== Baltica Brewery Cup ==
The tournament was played between 16–22 December 2002. Five of the matches were played in Moscow, Russia and one match in Espoo, Finland. The tournament was won by Czech Republic.

| Pos | Team | Pld | W | OTW | SOW | OTL | SOL | L | GF | GA | GD | Pts |
|---|---|---|---|---|---|---|---|---|---|---|---|---|
| 1 | Czech Republic | 4 | 2 | 0 | 1 | 0 | 1 | 0 | 14 | 8 | +6 | 9 |
| 2 | Finland | 4 | 3 | 0 | 0 | 0 | 0 | 1 | 10 | 5 | +5 | 9 |
| 3 | Russia | 4 | 2 | 0 | 1 | 0 | 0 | 1 | 11 | 7 | +4 | 8 |
| 4 | Slovakia | 4 | 1 | 0 | 0 | 0 | 0 | 3 | 6 | 14 | −8 | 3 |
| 5 | Sweden | 4 | 0 | 0 | 0 | 0 | 1 | 3 | 2 | 9 | −7 | 1 |

Source: swehockey

16 December 2002
| Finland | 4–1 | Slovakia |
| Sweden | 0–3 | Russia |
17 December 2002
| Sweden | 1–2 (GWS) | Czech Republic |
18 December 2002
| Czech Republic | 6–1 | Slovakia |
| Russia | 1-3 | Finland |
19 December 2002
| Finland | 1–0 | Sweden |
20 December 2002
| Slovakia | 3–1 | Sweden |
21 December 2002
| Czech Republic | 3–2 | Finland |
| Slovakia | 1–3 | Russia |
22 December 2002
| Russia | 4–3 (GWS) | Czech Republic |

== Sweden Hockey Games ==
The tournament was played between 4–9 February 2003. Five of the matches were played in Stockholm, Sweden and one match in Helsinki, Finland. The tournament was won by Russia.

| Pos | Team | Pld | W | OTW | OTL | L | GF | GA | GD | Pts |
|---|---|---|---|---|---|---|---|---|---|---|
| 1 | Russia | 4 | 3 | 1 | 0 | 0 | 14 | 7 | +7 | 11 |
| 2 | Sweden | 4 | 1 | 1 | 1 | 1 | 11 | 10 | +1 | 6 |
| 3 | Canada | 4 | 1 | 0 | 2 | 1 | 11 | 15 | −4 | 5 |
| 4 | Finland | 4 | 0 | 2 | 1 | 1 | 6 | 10 | −4 | 5 |
| 5 | Czech Republic | 4 | 0 | 1 | 1 | 2 | 9 | 9 | 0 | 3 |

Source: swehockey

4 February 2003
| Finland | 1–0 (OT) | Czech Republic |
| Sweden | 4–3 | Canada |
5 February 2003
| Russia | 4–1 | Canada |
6 February 2003
| Finland | 2–3 (OT) | Russia |
| Sweden | 4-1 | Czech Republic |
7 February 2003
| Czech Republic | 3–2 (GWS) | Canada |
8 February 2003
| Canada | 5–4 | Finland |
| Russia | 3–2 | Sweden |
9 February 2003
| Czech Republic | 2–3 | Russia |
| Sweden | 1–2 (GWS) | Finland |
