= Alexei Mikhnov =

Russian ice hockey player (born 1982)

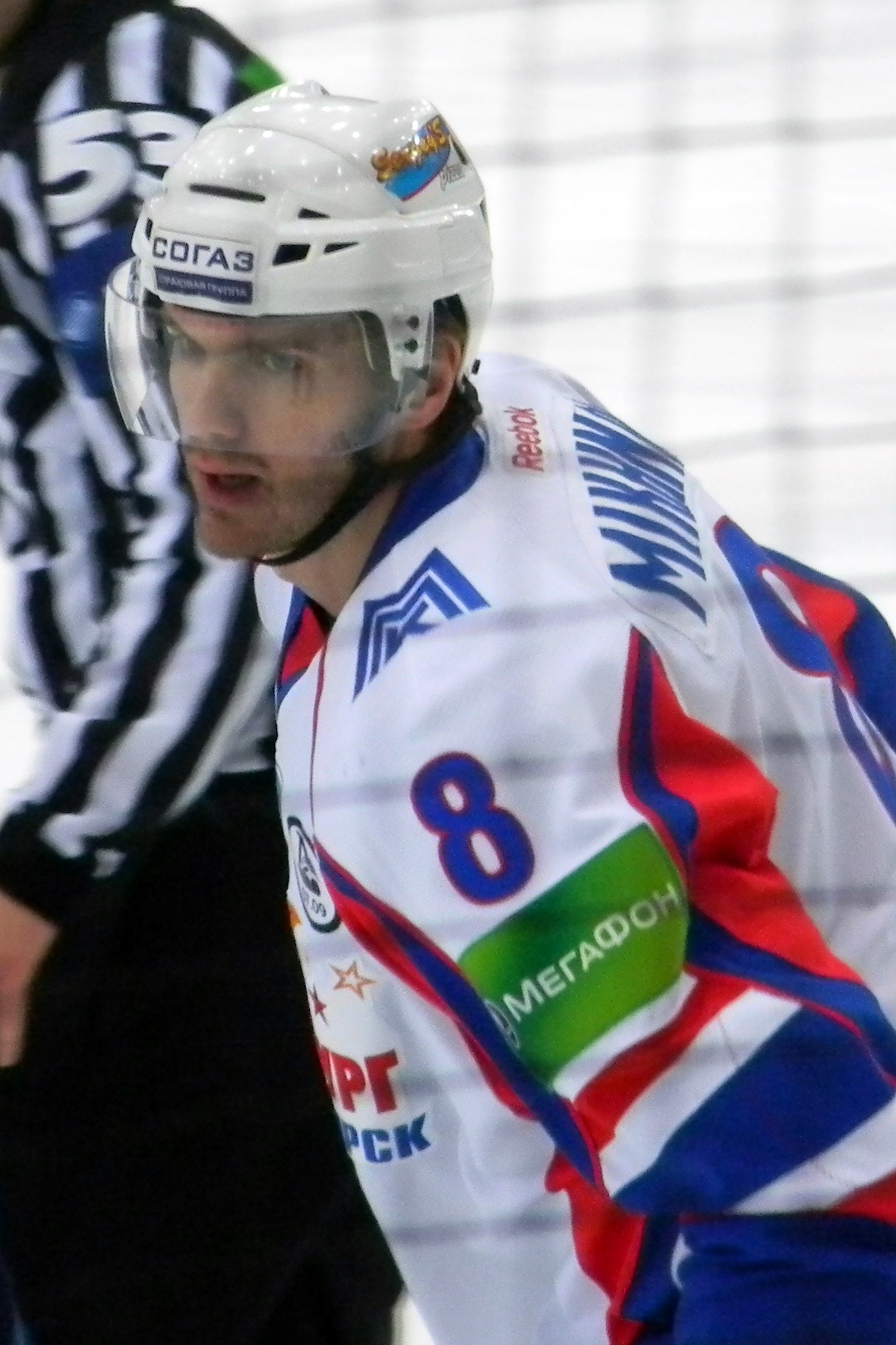
- Born: August 31, 1982 (age 43) Kiev, Ukrainian SSR, Soviet Union
- Height: 6 ft 6 in (198 cm)
- Weight: 218 lb (99 kg; 15 st 8 lb)
- Position: Left wing
- Shot: Left
- Played for: Lokomotiv Yaroslavl; THK Tver; Dynamo Moscow; Sibir Novosibirsk; Edmonton Oilers; Metallurg Magnitogorsk; Atlant Moscow Oblast; Avtomobilist Yekaterinburg; HC Yugra; Neftekhimik Nizhnekamsk; SC Csíkszereda; Severstal Cherepovets; Metallurg Zhlobin; HK Brest; Brest Albatros Hockey; HC Chiavenna
- National team: Russia
- NHL draft: 17th overall, 2000; Edmonton Oilers
- Playing career: 2000–2025

Oleksiy Pavlovych "Alexei" Mikhnov (Ukrainian: Олексій Павлович Міхнов) (born August 31, 1982) is a Ukrainian-Russian former professional ice hockey left winger.

== Playing career ==
Mikhnov was selected in the first round of the 2000 NHL entry draft, 17th overall, by the Edmonton Oilers, and has only played in two NHL games, his first being a 5–2 win versus Phoenix. He was scoreless and even in 4:21 of ice time. His brother Andrei Mikhnov was also a National Hockey League prospect and played in the Ontario Hockey League.

Mikhnov spent four seasons in the Russian Super League and was considered a power forward prospect. Despite being from Ukraine, Mikhnov (unlike his brother) plays internationally for Russia.

After being drafted in 2000, Mikhnov was a mystery to Oilers fans. Even when he was drafted, he was considered an enigma. When he first arrived in Edmonton in 2004, the Oilers' front office discovered that Mikhnov had poor eyesight, leading to the team buying him a pair of glasses.

Mikhnov was one of the more famous players impacted by the inability of the National Hockey League and the Russian Ice Hockey Federation to agree on a transfer arrangement, a situation which more famously affected Pittsburgh Penguins prospect Evgeni Malkin. On June 20, 2006, according to his agent, Mikhnov gave his two weeks' notice which theoretically could get him out of his contract with Lokomotiv Yaroslavl, and by early September, Mikhnov was skating in Edmonton, taking a spin on September 3 at the University of Alberta. Legal action by Lokomotiv Yaroslavl to retain Mikhnov was swiftly dismissed in court. On September 5, 2006, Mikhnov signed a one-year deal with the Oilers.

On January 24th, 2007, Mikhnov was assigned back to Lokomotiv Yaroslavl for the remainder of the season. The Oilers gave him his qualifying offer to retain his rights, but never brought him over again.

In April 2011, Lokomotiv Yaroslavl opted not to renew his contract after 7 seasons with the club. In May 2011, Mikhnov signed a deal with Metallurg Magnitogorsk of the KHL. In June 2012, despite extending his deal just a week prior, Metallurg released Mikhnov.

In August, after a month on a tryout, Mikhnov signed a deal with HC Atlant. In April 2013, Mikhnov extended his deal for a year.

In August 2014, Mikhnov signed a tryout with Metallurg Zhlobin of the Belarusian Extraleague (BXL). In September 2014, he signed a deal with THK Tver of the Supreme Hockey League (VHL). Within a month, Mikhnov earned a deal with Avtomobilist Yekaterinburg.

In May 2015, Mikhnov signed a one-year deal with HC Yugra of the KHL. In November, he was waived and his contract was terminated by mutual agreement shortly thereafter. The next day, Mikhnov returned to THK Tver of the VHL. He remained there for two games before returning to Avtomobilist Yekaterinburg of the KHL for the rest of the season.

Mikhnov remained in Yekaterinburg for the next two years, captaining the team in 2017-18.

In July 2018, Mikhnov signed a tryout deal with Neftekhimik Nizhnekamsk of the KHL. On August 24th, 2018, Mikhnov was upgraded to a one-year contract. In October, the deal was terminated by mutual agreement. Within a week, Mikhnov signed with SC Csíkszereda, who compete in Erste Liga and the Romanian Hockey League. In December 2018, he signed a deal with Severstal Cherepovets of the KHL.

In July 2019, Mikhnov and his brother Andrei joined Metallurg Zhlobin of the Belarusian Extraleague. In 3 years in Zhlobin, Mikhnov led the team in scoring 3 times, led the Belarusian Extraleague in points once, and won two Belarusian Championships.

In 2022, Mikhnov opted to leave Zhlobin for HK Brest, but returned to Zhlobin mid-season.

In July 2023, Mikhnov signed with Albatros de Brest of FFHG Division 1 (France2).

In 2024, Mikhnov joined Chiavenna of the Italian Hockey League - Division 1 (Italian Tier 3).

After the 2024-25 season, Mikhnov retired to become an assistant coach for Metallurg Zhlobin of the Belarusian Extraleague.

== Career statistics ==
=== Regular season and playoffs ===
			Regular season					Playoffs
Season	Team	League	GP	G	A	Pts	PIM	GP	G	A	Pts	PIM
1998–99	Lokomotiv–2 Yaroslavl	RUS.2	14	2	2	4	4	—	—	—	—	—
1999–00	Lokomotiv–2 Yaroslavl	RUS.3	40	22	13	35	4	—	—	—	—	—
2000–01	Krystall–2 Elektrostal	RUS.3	46	4	7	11	10	—	—	—	—	—
2000–01	THK Tver	RUS.2	22	5	11	16	6	—	—	—	—	—
2000–01	CSKA Moscow	RUS.2	4	0	0	0	2	—	—	—	—	—
2001–02	Salavat Yulaev Ufa	RSL	1	0	0	0	0	—	—	—	—	—
2001–02	Dynamo Moscow	RSL	26	2	1	3	4	3	0	0	0	2
2001–02	Dynamo–2 Moscow	RUS.3	8	8	6	14	0	—	—	—	—	—
2002–03	Sibir Novosibirsk	RSL	51	7	9	16	10	—	—	—	—	—
2003–04	Sibir Novosibirsk	RSL	58	14	8	22	22	—	—	—	—	—
2003–04	Sibir–2 Novosibirsk	RUS.3	1	1	0	1	0	—	—	—	—	—
2004–05	Sibir Novosibirsk	RSL	26	3	2	5	12	—	—	—	—	—
2004–05	Lokomotiv Yaroslavl	RSL	18	0	9	9	4	7	0	0	0	4
2004–05	Lokomotiv–2 Yaroslavl	RUS.3	4	4	1	5	4	—	—	—	—	—
2005–06	Lokomotiv Yaroslavl	RSL	40	14	7	21	18	11	4	4	8	4
2006–07	Edmonton Oilers	NHL	2	0	0	0	0	—	—	—	—	—
2006–07	Wilkes–Barre/Scranton Penguins	AHL	27	6	12	18	22	—	—	—	—	—
2006–07	Lokomotiv Yaroslavl	RSL	11	5	3	8	6	7	2	3	5	4
2007–08	Lokomotiv Yaroslavl	RSL	52	14	20	34	50	16	3	5	8	14
2008–09	Lokomotiv Yaroslavl	KHL	52	16	17	33	57	19	8	4	12	10
2009–10	Lokomotiv Yaroslavl	KHL	40	7	14	21	16	17	7	6	13	10
2010–11	Lokomotiv Yaroslavl	KHL	30	3	12	15	12	17	1	4	5	12
2011–12	Metallurg Magnitogorsk	KHL	39	8	10	18	12	12	0	3	3	0
2012–13	Atlant Mytishchi	KHL	39	11	8	19	22	5	0	1	1	2
2013–14	Atlant Mytishchi	KHL	47	7	6	13	10	—	—	—	—	—
2014–15	Avtomobilist Yekaterinburg	KHL	42	9	7	16	20	5	0	2	2	0
2014–15	THK Tver	VHL	6	3	3	6	14	—	—	—	—	—
2015–16	Yugra Khanty–Mansiysk	KHL	20	2	2	4	6	—	—	—	—	—
2015–16	THK Tver	VHL	2	1	2	3	0	—	—	—	—	—
2015–16	Avtomobilist Yekaterinburg	KHL	22	8	5	13	8	6	0	0	0	2
2016–17	Avtomobilist Yekaterinburg	KHL	38	6	13	19	12	—	—	—	—	—
2016–17	Avtomobilist Yekaterinburg	KHL	45	12	10	22	8	3	0	0	0	4
2018–19	Neftekhimik Nizhnekamsk	KHL	6	1	1	2	0	—	—	—	—	—
2018–19	HC Csíkszereda	EL	8	3	2	5		—	—	—	—	—
2018–19	HC Csíkszereda	ROU	10	20	15	35	12	—	—	—	—	—
2018–19	Severstal Cherepovets	KHL	22	5	2	7	4	—	—	—	—	—
2019–20	Metallurg Zhlobin	BLR	50	18	18	36	63	4	1	1	2	0
2020–21	Metallurg Zhlobin	BLR	41	14	18	32	16	13	8	5	13	2
2021–22	Metallurg Zhlobin	BLR	53	27	26	53	37	7	5	3	8	0
RSL totals			283	59	59	118	126	44	9	12	21	26
NHL totals			2	0	0	0	0	—	—	—	—	—
KHL totals			442	95	107	202	187	84	16	20	36	40

=== International ===
Year	Team	Event	Result	GP	G	A	Pts	PIM
2006	Russia	WC	5th	7	4	2	6	2
Senior totals				7	4	2	6	2

Awards and achievements
Preceded by Jani Rita	Edmonton Oilers first-round draft pick 2000	Succeeded by Ales Hemsky
