= 2004–05 Euro Hockey Tour =

Tournament details
- Dates: 11 November 2004 – 24 April 2005
- Teams: 4

Final positions
- Champions: Russia (1st title)
- Runners-up: Sweden
- Third place: Finland
- Fourth place: Czech Republic

Tournament statistics
- Games played: 28
- Goals scored: 77 (2.75 per game)
- Attendance: 158,201 (5,650 per game)
- Scoring leader: (Sweden) Jonathan Hedström (5 points)

The 2004–05 Euro Hockey Tour was the ninth season of the Euro Hockey Tour. The season consisted of three tournaments, the Karjala Tournament, Rosno Cup, and the Sweden Hockey Games. The top two teams met in the final, and the third and fourth place teams met for the third place game.

== Standings ==
Pos	Team	Pld	W	OTW	OTL	L	GF	GA	GD	Pts
1	Russia	9	4	1	0	4	26	21	+5	14
2	Sweden	9	3	2	1	3	22	24	−2	14
3	Czech Republic	9	2	2	3	2	25	26	−1	13
4	Finland	9	3	1	2	3	24	26	−2	13

Source: eurohockey

== Karjala Tournament ==
The tournament was played between 11–14 November 2004. Five of the matches were played in Helsinki, Finland and one match in Linköping, Sweden. The tournament was won by Finland.

Pos	Team	Pld	W	OTW	OTL	L	GF	GA	GD	Pts
1	Finland	3	2	0	0	1	9	8	+1	6
2	Sweden	3	1	1	0	1	7	8	−1	5
3	Czech Republic	3	1	0	1	1	8	9	−1	4
4	Russia	3	1	0	0	2	10	9	+1	3

Source: flashscore

11 November 2004
Finland	0–3	Czech Republic
Sweden	2–1	Russia
13 November 2004
Czech Republic	2–3 (GWS)	Sweden
Finland	4–3	Russia
14 November 2004
Russia	6–3	Czech Republic
Finland	5-2	Sweden

== Rosno Cup ==
The tournament was played between 16–19 December 2004. All of the matches were played in Moscow, Russia. The tournament was won by Russia.

Pos	Team	Pld	W	OTW	SOW	OTL	SOL	L	GF	GA	GD	Pts
1	Russia	3	3	0	0	0	0	0	7	2	+5	9
2	Finland	3	1	1	0	0	0	1	9	6	+3	5
3	Czech Republic	3	0	0	1	1	0	1	8	6	+2	3
4	Sweden	3	0	0	0	0	1	2	4	11	−7	1

Source: swehockey

16 December 2004
Czech Republic	4–3 (GWS)	Sweden
Russia	2–1	Finland
18 December 2004
Sweden	1–4	Russia
Finland	5–4 (OT)	Czech Republic
19 December 2004
Russia	1–0	Czech Republic
Finland	3-0	Sweden

== Sweden Hockey Games ==
The tournament was played between 10–13 December 2004. Five of the matches were played in Stockholm, Sweden and one match in Tampere, Finland. The tournament was won by Sweden.

Pos	Team	Pld	W	OTW	OTL	L	GF	GA	GD	Pts
1	Sweden	3	2	1	0	0	11	5	+6	8
2	Czech Republic	3	1	1	1	0	6	15	−9	6
3	Russia	3	0	1	0	2	16	13	+3	2
4	Finland	3	0	0	2	1	8	4	+4	2

Source: swehockey

10 February 2005
Russia	4–3 (OT)	Finland
Czech Republic	2–3 (GWS)	Sweden
12 February 2005
Finland	2–3 (OT)	Czech Republic
Sweden	3–2	Russia
13 February 2005
Czech Republic	4–3	Russia
Sweden	5-1	Finland

== Final tournament ==
=== 3rd place ===
22 April 2005; 17:00	Czech Republic	3-3 (1-3, 1-0, 1-0)	Finland	Ivan Hlinka Stadion, Litvínov; Attendance: 3,555

Game reference

Tomáš Vokoun
Goalies
Fredrik Norrena
Referee:
(Sweden) Christer Lärking

Vrbata (Kotalík, Hlaváč) – 06:36	1-0
	1-1	13:02 – Niemi (Kallio, Peltonen) (PP)
	1-2	14:10 – Jokinen (Viuhkola)
	1-3	15:52 – Pakaslahti (Väänänen)
Výborný (Straka) (SHG) – 24:45	2-3
Dvořák (Prospal) – 45:15	3-3

8 min
Penalties
8 min
44
Shots
28

24 April 2005; 18:00	Finland	4-0 (0-0, 2-0, 2-0)	Czech Republic	Hartwall Arena, Helsinki; Attendance: 8,569

Game reference

Niklas Bäckström
Goalies
Milan Hnilička
Referee:
(Russia) Vyacheslav Bulanov
Linesmen:
(Sweden) Stefan Fonselius
(Finland) Antti Hämäläinen

Nummelin (Jokinen, Kallio) – 23:41	1-0
Kallio (Nummelin) (PP) – 29:10	2-0
Kallio (Peltonen, Jokinen) – 40:20	3-0
Peltonen (Nummelin) – 44:25	4-0

30 min
Penalties
41 min
6
Shots
12

=== Final ===
22 April 2005; 19:30	Sweden	1-2 (0-0, 1-1, 0-1)	Russia	Globe Arena, Stockholm; Attendance: 8,173

Game reference

Henrik Lundqvist
Goalies
Maxim Sokolov
Referee:
(Czech Republic) Vladimír Šindler
Linesmen:
(Finland) Leo Takula
(Sweden) Joacim Karlsson

	0-1	25:09 – Kovalchuk (Zinovjev)
H.Sedin (D.Sedin) – 30:59	1-1
	1-2	50:49 – Malkin (Ovechkin)

10 min
Penalties
14 min
28
Shots
34

24 April 2005; 13:00	Russia	5-2 (2-2, 2-0, 1-0)	Sweden	Luzhniki Stadium, Moscow; Attendance: 8,100

Game reference

Maxim Sokolov
Goalies
Johan Holmqvist
Referee:
(Finland) Jyri Rönn

	0-1	05:54 – Kronwall
Kovalev (Vyshedkevich) (PP) – 12:53	1-1
	1-2	13:47 – Johan Franzén (Hagos)
Kozlov (Yashin) – 16:44	2-2
Kovalchuk (Kozlov) – 26:09	3-2
Ovechkin (Afinogenov) – 32:04	4-2
Semin (Kozlov, Yashin) – 41:46	5-2

10 min
Penalties
26 min
26
Shots
28
