= 2001–02 Euro Hockey Tour =

Tournament details
- Dates: 6 September 2001 – 21 April 2002
- Teams: 4

Final positions
- Champions: Finland (4th title)
- Runners-up: Russia
- Third place: Sweden
- Fourth place: Czech Republic

Tournament statistics
- Games played: 24
- Goals scored: 134 (5.58 per game)
- Attendance: 157,788 (6,575 per game)
- Scoring leader: (Czech Republic) Petr Leška (8 points)

The 2001–02 Euro Hockey Tour was the sixth season of the Euro Hockey Tour. The season consisted of four tournaments, the Česká Pojišťovna Cup, Sweden Hockey Games, Baltica Brewery Cup, and the Karjala Tournament.

== Standings ==
Pos	Team	Pld	W	OTW	OTL	L	GF	GA	GD	Pts
1	Finland	12	5	3	1	3	36	26	+10	22
2	Russia	12	5	1	2	4	24	27	−3	19
3	Sweden	12	5	1	0	6	23	28	−5	17
4	Czech Republic	12	3	1	3	5	27	29	−2	14

Source: eurohockey

== Baltica Brewery Cup ==
The tournament was played between 18–22 December 2001. All of the matches were played in Moscow, Russia. The tournament was won by Czech Republic.

Pos	Team	Pld	W	OTW	SOW	OTL	SOL	L	GF	GA	GD	Pts
1	Czech Republic	3	2	0	1	0	0	0	12	5	+7	8
2	Russia	3	1	0	1	0	0	1	6	8	−2	5
3	Sweden	3	0	0	1	0	1	1	8	10	−2	3
4	Finland	3	0	0	0	0	2	1	7	11	−4	2

Source: swehockey

18 December 2001
Czech Republic	4–3 (GWS)	Sweden
Russia	3–2 (GWS)	Finland
20 December 2001
Finland	2–4	Czech Republic
Sweden	1-3	Russia
21 December 2001
Finland	3–4 (GWS)	Sweden
Russia	0–4	Czech Republic

== Česká Pojišťovna Cup ==
The tournament was played between 6–9 September 2001. Five of the matches were played in Zlín, Czech Republic and one match in Helsinki, Finland. The tournament was won by Finland.

Pos	Team	Pld	W	OTW	OTL	L	GF	GA	GD	Pts
1	Finland	3	3	0	0	0	9	3	+6	9
2	Russia	3	0	2	0	1	10	9	+1	4
3	Sweden	3	1	0	1	1	8	9	−1	4
4	Czech Republic	3	0	0	2	1	5	11	−6	2

Source: swehockey

6 September 2001
Czech Republic	4–5 (GWS)	Russia
Finland	4–2	Sweden
8 September 2001
Finland	2–1	Russia
Sweden	3-1	Czech Republic
9 September 2001
Russia	4–3 (GWS)	Sweden
Czech Republic	0–3	Finland

== Sweden Hockey Games ==
Pos	Team	Pld	W	OTW	OTL	L	GF	GA	GD	Pts
1	Sweden	4	2	1	1	0	15	9	+6	9
2	Czech Republic	4	2	1	0	1	14	7	+7	8
3	Finland	4	2	0	0	2	12	17	−5	6
4	Russia	4	1	1	1	1	9	10	−1	6
5	Canada	4	0	0	1	3	10	17	−7	1

Source: swehockey

6 November 2001
Finland	2–7	Czech Republic
Sweden	7–4	Canada
7 November 2001
Russia	3–2 (GWS)	Canada
8 November 2001
Finland	4–2	Russia
Sweden	1–2 (OT)	Russia
9 November 2001
Czech Republic	3–1	Canada
10 November 2001
Canada	3–4	Finland
Russia	1–2 (GWS)	Sweden
11 November 2001
Czech Republic	2–3	Russia
Sweden	5–2	Finland

== Karjala Tournament ==
The tournament was played between 18–21 April 2002. Five of the matches were played in Helsinki, Finland and one match in Stockholm, Sweden. The tournament was won by Finland.

Pos	Team	Pld	W	OTW	OTL	L	GF	GA	GD	Pts
1	Finland	3	2	1	0	0	10	5	+5	8
2	Russia	3	1	1	1	0	8	5	+3	6
3	Sweden	3	1	0	1	1	7	7	0	4
4	Czech Republic	3	0	0	0	3	6	14	−8	0

Source: flashscore

18 April 2002
Finland	1–1 (GWS)	Russia
Sweden	4–2	Czech Republic
20 April 2002
Finland	6–3	Czech Republic
Russia	3-2 (GWS)	Sweden
21 April 2002
Czech Republic	1–4	Russia
Finland	2–1	Sweden
