= Fedor Fedorov (ice hockey) =

Russian ice hockey player (born 1981)

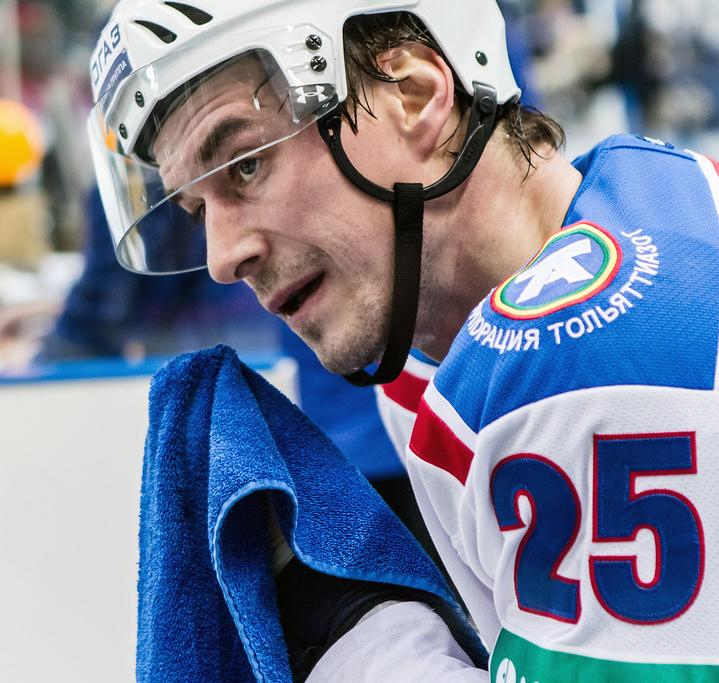
- Born: 11 June 1981 (age 45) Apatity, Russian SFSR, Soviet Union
- Height: 6 ft 4 in (193 cm)
- Weight: 240 lb (109 kg; 17 st 2 lb)
- Position: Left wing
- Shot: Left
- Played for: Vancouver Canucks; Spartak Moscow; Metallurg Magnitogorsk; New York Rangers; Lokomotiv Yaroslavl; Malmö Redhawks; Dynamo Moscow; Nizhnekamsk Neftekhimik; Atlant Moscow Oblast; SKA Saint Petersburg; CSKA Moscow; Lada Togliatti
- National team: Russia
- NHL draft: 182nd overall, 1999; Tampa Bay Lightning; 66th overall, 2001; Vancouver Canucks
- Playing career: 2001–2015

Fyodor Viktorovich Fyodorov (Russian: Фёдор Викторович Фёдоров; born 11 June 1981) is a Russian former professional ice hockey forward who last played for Lada Togliatti of the Kontinental Hockey League (KHL). He previously played in the National Hockey League (NHL) for the Vancouver Canucks and the New York Rangers. His older brother, former NHL superstar Sergei Fedorov, is the general manager of CSKA Moscow.

== Playing career ==
Fedorov was drafted by the Tampa Bay Lightning in the sixth round, 182nd overall, in the 1999 NHL entry draft. The Lightning did not sign within the two-year period of owning his rights, so he re-entered the NHL draft in 2001. He was drafted by the Vancouver Canucks in the third round (66th overall).

He played 15 NHL games with Vancouver Canucks, and 116 games with the Manitoba Moose, the minor-league affiliate of the Canucks.

On 24 March 2004, Fedorov was involved in an off-ice incident with teammate Kevin Bieksa. According to then-Canucks General Manager Brian Burke, several Moose players had gone out together when Bieksa accidentally spilled Fedorov's beer. While Bieksa apologized and offered to buy him another beer, Fedorov challenged him to a fight outside of the establishment, resulting in Bieksa knocking him down with one well-landed punch. This eventually led to Bieksa getting signed to a contract with the Canucks, where he would spend 10 seasons of his career.

On 7 October 2005, the Canucks traded Fedorov to the New York Rangers for Jozef Balej and a sixth round pick in 2008. He played just three games for the Rangers, playing mostly with their American Hockey League (AHL) affiliate, the Hartford Wolf Pack.

On 25 July 2006, he signed with Lokomotiv Yaroslavl of the Russian Superleague (RSL). Later in the 2006–07 season, he signed with the Malmö Redhawks of the Swedish Elitserien.

On 4 July 2008, Fedorov signed an NHL contract with the New Jersey Devils. Fedorov did not make the Devils' NHL roster and, after choosing not to report to AHL affiliate Lowell Devils, he was released by the team.

On 22 October 2008, Fedorov signed with Nizhnekamsk Neftekhimik of the newly formed Russian Kontinental Hockey League (KHL). He signed subsequently with Metallurg Magnitogorsk of the KHL. He played the 2011-2013 seasons with SKA Saint Petersburg, also of the KHL. During the 2013 offseason, Fedorov signed a contract with CSKA Moscow. After one season in Moscow, on 2 October 2014, Fedorov was on the move again after he signed as a free agent with HC Lada Togliatti on a one-year contract.

== Career statistics ==
=== Regular season and playoffs ===
			Regular season					Playoffs
Season	Team	League	GP	G	A	Pts	PIM	GP	G	A	Pts	PIM
1997–98	Detroit Little Caesars	MNHL	13	3	7	10	18	—	—	—	—	—
1998–99	Port Huron Border Cats	UHL	42	2	5	7	20	—	—	—	—	—
1999–2000	Windsor Spitfires	OHL	60	8	10	18	115	12	1	0	1	4
2000–01	Sudbury Wolves	OHL	67	33	45	78	88	12	4	6	10	36
2001–02	Columbia Inferno	ECHL	2	0	2	2	0	—	—	—	—	—
2001–02	Manitoba Moose	AHL	8	2	1	3	6	—	—	—	—	—
2002–03	Vancouver Canucks	NHL	7	0	1	1	4	—	—	—	—	—
2002–03	Manitoba Moose	AHL	50	10	13	23	61	3	1	2	3	0
2003–04	Vancouver Canucks	NHL	8	0	1	1	4	—	—	—	—	—
2003–04	Manitoba Moose	AHL	58	23	16	39	52	—	—	—	—	—
2004–05	Spartak Moscow	RSL	19	4	7	11	52	—	—	—	—	—
2004–05	Metallurg Magnitogorsk	RSL	10	3	0	3	22	5	2	0	2	30
2005–06	New York Rangers	NHL	3	0	0	0	6	—	—	—	—	—
2005–06	Hartford Wolf Pack	AHL	38	2	15	17	80	—	—	—	—	—
2005–06	Syracuse Crunch	AHL	12	2	3	5	22	3	0	0	0	2
2006–07	Lokomotiv Yaroslavl	RSL	20	3	4	7	32	—	—	—	—	—
2006–07	Lokomotiv–2 Yaroslavl	RUS.3	3	3	1	4	16	—	—	—	—	—
2006–07	Malmö Redhawks	SEL	8	2	4	6	51	—	—	—	—	—
2007–08	Dynamo Moscow	RSL	49	12	14	26	119	9	0	3	3	24
2008–09	Neftekhimik Nizhnekamsk	KHL	32	9	14	23	95	3	0	0	0	14
2009–10	Metallurg Magnitogorsk	KHL	36	5	8	13	110	8	0	0	0	20
2010–11	Metallurg Magnitogorsk	KHL	5	0	1	1	42	—	—	—	—	—
2010–11	Neftekhimik Nizhnekamsk	KHL	8	2	1	3	10	—	—	—	—	—
2010–11	Atlant Moscow Oblast	KHL	27	9	17	26	53	24	4	6	10	65
2011–12	SKA Saint Petersburg	KHL	50	7	10	17	102	14	4	5	9	44
2012–13	SKA Saint Petersburg	KHL	38	6	4	10	42	10	1	1	2	39
2013–14	CSKA Moscow	KHL	35	1	3	4	73	—	—	—	—	—
2014–15	Lada Togliatti	KHL	41	3	10	13	92	—	—	—	—	—
NHL totals			18	0	2	2	14	—	—	—	—	—
RSL totals			98	23	24	47	225	14	2	3	5	54
KHL totals			272	42	67	109	619	59	9	12	21	182

=== International ===
Year	Team	Event	Result	GP	G	A	Pts	PIM
1999	Russia	WJC18	6th	7	0	0	0	6
2005	Russia	WC	3rd place, bronze medalist(s)	6	0	1	1	2
Junior totals				7	0	0	0	6
Senior totals				6	0	1	1	2

== See also ==
- Notable families in the NHL
