= Thomas Rhodin =

Swedish ice hockey player (born 1971)

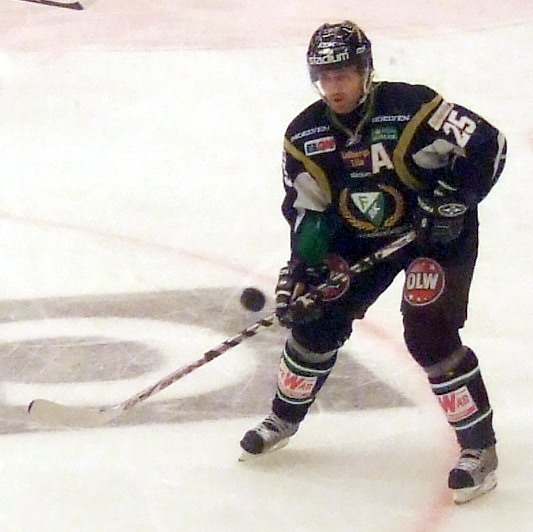
- Born: April 8, 1971 (age 54) Karlstad, SWE
- Height: 5 ft 11 in (180 cm)
- Weight: 190 lb (86 kg; 13 st 8 lb)
- Position: Defence
- Shot: Right
- Played for: Färjestad BK; Eisbären Berlin; HC Fribourg-Gottéron; Genève-Servette HC; Leksands IF
- National team: Sweden
- Playing career: 1990–2010

Thomas Rhodin (born April 8, 1971) is a Swedish former professional ice hockey defenceman.

== Career ==
Rhodin started his career with Färjestad BK in 1989 and has played a total of twelve seasons with them. He has also played with the German club Eisbären Berlin between 1997 and 2000 and with the Nationalliga A teams HC Fribourg-Gottéron (2003–05) and Genève-Servette HC (2005). In 2002, 2003 and 2005, he represented Sweden at the Ice Hockey World Championship. Before the start of the 2005/06, he was offered a contract by NHL club the Dallas Stars, but turned it down. Instead, he signed with Färjestad, was named as alternate captain, and was eventually released on 9 April 2009. On 8 May 2009, he signed with Skåre BK. On 5 September 2009 it was announced that he had signed with Leksands IF. He had opted to use a clause in his contract with Skåre BK which allowed him to sign with a team from a higher division.

== Career statistics ==
=== Regular season and playoffs ===
			Regular season					Playoffs
Season	Team	League	GP	G	A	Pts	PIM	GP	G	A	Pts	PIM
1988–89	Färjestad BK	SWE U20
1989–90	Färjestad BK	SEL	6	0	2	2	4	—	—	—	—	—
1990–91	Färjestad BK	SEL	36	1	12	13	16	8	0	0	0	4
1991–92	Färjestad BK	SEL	25	0	1	1	10	5	0	1	1	0
1991–92	Grums IK	SWE.2	12	2	5	7	8	—	—	—	—	—
1992–93	Färjestad BK	SEL	40	5	3	8	40	3	1	2	3	0
1993–94	Färjestad BK	SEL	22	0	4	4	28	—	—	—	—	—
1993–94	Färjestad BK	Allsv	14	0	3	3	12	3	0	1	1	6
1994–95	Färjestad BK	SEL	40	3	4	7	80	4	0	0	0	2
1995–96	Färjestad BK	SEL	40	3	7	10	42	8	0	0	0	4
1996–97	Färjestad BK	SEL	50	9	16	25	36	14	4	8	12	14
1997–98	Eisbären Berlin	DEL	40	5	19	24	22	10	1	4	5	2
1998–99	Eisbären Berlin	DEL	49	5	22	27	36	8	1	7	8	8
1999–2000	Eisbären Berlin	DEL	56	5	22	27	32	—	—	—	—	—
2000–01	Färjestad BK	SEL	50	7	24	31	77	16	1	8	9	20
2001–02	Färjestad BK	SEL	50	11	21	32	61	9	0	5	5	10
2002–03	Färjestad BK	SEL	50	14	18	32	62	13	2	6	8	8
2003–04	HC Fribourg–Gottéron	NLA	48	16	19	35	44	4	1	1	2	6
2004–05	HC Fribourg–Gottéron	NLA	42	6	24	30	48	—	—	—	—	—
2004–05	Genève–Servette HC	SUI.2	1	0	1	1	0	—	—	—	—	—
2005–06	Färjestad BK	SEL	43	5	16	21	38	18	5	9	14	2
2006–07	Färjestad BK	SEL	55	9	36	45	50	9	3	5	8	8
2007–08	Färjestad BK	SEL	55	9	14	23	60	12	2	7	9	24
2008–09	Färjestad BK	SEL	38	7	9	16	18	6	0	3	3	2
2009–10	Leksands IF	SWE.2	42	7	26	33	40	10	0	6	6	14
SEL totals			600	83	187	270	622	125	18	54	72	98
DEL totals			145	15	63	78	90	18	2	11	13	10

=== International ===
Year	Team	Event	GP	G	A	Pts	PIM
1991	Sweden	WJC	7	1	0	1	0
2002	Sweden	WC	9	4	1	5	10
2003	Sweden	WC	9	1	1	2	10
2005	Sweden	WC	8	1	2	3	4
Senior totals			26	6	4	10	24
