= Radek Duda =

Czech professional ice hockey player

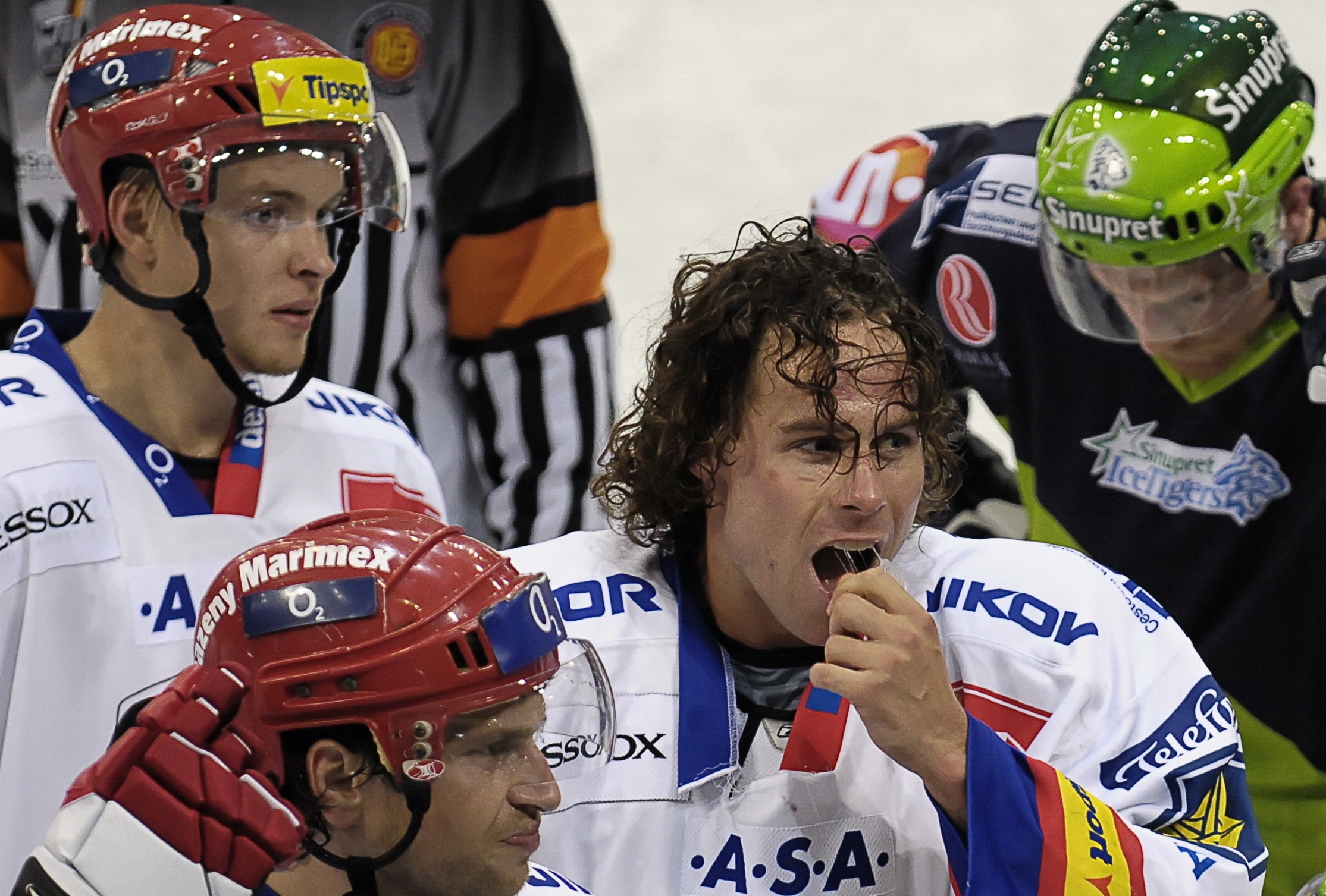
- Born: January 28, 1979 (age 47) Chodov, Czechoslovakia
- Height: 6 ft 1 in (185 cm)
- Weight: 201 lb (91 kg; 14 st 5 lb)
- Position: Right wing
- Shoots: Left
- Played for: HC Sparta Praha; HC Energie Karlovy Vary; HK Dukla Trenčín
- National team: Czech Republic
- NHL draft: 192nd overall, 1998; Calgary Flames
- Playing career: 1997–present

Radek Duda (born January 28, 1979, in Chodov) is a Czech former professional ice hockey player. He was selected by the Calgary Flames in the 7th round (192nd overall) of the 1998 NHL entry draft. played in the WHL with the Regina Pats

Duda played with HC Plzeň in the Czech Extraliga during the 2010–11 Czech Extraliga season.

== Legal issues ==
Radek Duda was in 2012 conditionally sentenced to 3 months in prison for battering of a pedestrian on a crossing. For another two similar incidents Duda got a fine.

== Career statistics ==
			Regular season					Playoffs
Season	Team	League	GP	G	A	Pts	PIM	GP	G	A	Pts	PIM
1994–95	HC Banik Sokolov U18	Czech U18	31	65	33	98	—	—	—	—	—	—
1996–97	HC Sparta Praha U18	Czech U18	20	9	14	23	—	—	—	—	—	—
1996–97	HC Sparta Praha	Czech	—	—	—	—	—	1	0	0	0	0
1996–97	HC Banik Sokolov	Czech2	1	0	0	0	—	—	—	—	—	—
1997–98	HC Sparta Praha	Czech	39	4	3	7	14	10	0	2	2	6
1998–99	Regina Pats	WHL	65	24	31	55	139	—	—	—	—	—
1999–00	Lethbridge Hurricanes	WHL	69	42	64	106	193	—	—	—	—	—
2000–01	HC Sparta Praha	Czech	18	2	1	3	66	—	—	—	—	—
2000–01	HC Plzen	Czech	24	5	6	11	49	—	—	—	—	—
2000–01	Kapfenberger SV	Austria	6	5	4	9	12	—	—	—	—	—
2001–02	HC Plzen	Czech	49	17	18	35	156	6	1	5	6	18
2002–03	HC Plzen	Czech	13	5	8	13	47	—	—	—	—	—
2002–03	HC Slavia Praha	Czech	31	12	15	27	105	17	7	3	10	40
2003–04	Ak Bars Kazan	Russia	41	6	9	15	58	3	1	1	2	2
2004–05	HC Slavia Praha	Czech	32	6	4	10	52	—	—	—	—	—
2004–05	HC Plzen	Czech	16	3	6	9	55	—	—	—	—	—
2005–06	HC Slavia Praha	Czech	51	17	27	44	158	13	1	6	7	54
2006–07	Malmö Redhawks	Elitserien	9	1	1	2	20	—	—	—	—	—
2006–07	Ilves	SM-liiga	34	8	20	28	72	6	0	0	0	8
2007–08	HC Slavia Praha	Czech	28	11	9	20	80	—	—	—	—	—
2007–08	SC Langnau	NLA	10	2	5	7	18	—	—	—	—	—
2007–08	EHC Basel	NLA	7	3	3	6	16	—	—	—	—	—
2008–09	HC Mountfield	Czech	49	7	16	23	96	—	—	—	—	—
2009–10	KLH Chomutov	Czech2	44	23	37	60	161	16	4	17	21	50
2010–11	KLH Chomutov	Czech2	20	8	16	24	53	12	4	8	12	36
2010–11	HC Plzen 1929	Czech	25	16	13	29	42	—	—	—	—	—
2011–12	HC Plzen 1929	Czech	52	24	35	59	88	12	3	4	7	46
2012–13	Piráti Chomutov	Czech	19	2	12	14	46	—	—	—	—	—
2012–13	Bílí Tygři Liberec	Czech	25	10	10	20	64	—	—	—	—	—
2013–14	HC Plzen	Czech	47	17	24	41	141	5	0	1	1	12
2014–15	HC Energie Karlovy Vary	Czech	46	19	17	36	146	—	—	—	—	—
2015–16	HC Energie Karlovy Vary	Czech	19	7	9	16	51	—	—	—	—	—
2015–16	HC Banik Sokolov	Czech3	2	1	9	10	0	—	—	—	—	—
2015–16	HC Litvínov	Czech	20	1	3	4	36	—	—	—	—	—
2016–17	EHC Freiburg	DEL2	48	18	29	47	142	5	2	4	6	6
2017–18	EHC Freiburg	DEL2	47	15	21	36	111	—	—	—	—	—
2018–19	HC Benátky nad Jizerou	Czech2	10	3	3	6	14	—	—	—	—	—
2018–19	Piráti Chomutov	Czech	44	9	14	23	56	—	—	—	—	—
2019–20	HC Benátky nad Jizerou	Czech2	46	17	26	43	111	—	—	—	—	—
2019–20	EHC Lustenau	AlpsHL	9	3	5	8	10	—	—	—	—	—
2021–22	HC Benátky nad Jizerou	Czech2	15	7	6	13	30	—	—	—	—	—
2021–22	HK Dukla Trencin	Slovak	12	2	2	4	16	2	0	0	0	2
Czech totals			647	194	250	444	1,548	84	20	38	58	242
