= Fredrik Warg =

Swedish ice hockey player

- Born: May 3, 1979 (age 47) Skellefteå, SWE
- Height: 6 ft 1.2 in (186 cm)
- Weight: 198 lb (90 kg; 14 st 2 lb)
- Position: Centre
- Shot: Right
- Played for: Skellefteå AIK; Timrå IK; Björklöven and Modo; ERC Ingolstadt
- National team: Sweden
- Playing career: 2000–2015

Bo John Fredrik Warg (born May 3, 1979 in Skellefteå, Sweden) is a retired forward who last played for the ERC Ingolstadt hockey team in Germany. He also played for Björklöven, Modo and Timrå IK. He reached an agreement with Dinamo Riga of KHL and joined his fellow countryman Björn Melin for 11-12 season.

== Career statistics ==
			Regular season					Playoffs
Season	Team	League	GP	G	A	Pts	PIM	GP	G	A	Pts	PIM
1994–95	Bolidens FFI	Division 2	12	5	1	6	10	—	—	—	—	—
1995–96	Modo Hockey J20	J20 SuperElit	23	4	3	7	2	—	—	—	—	—
1996–97	Modo Hockey J20	J20 SuperElit	25	3	10	13	—	—	—	—	—	—
1997–98	Modo Hockey J20	J20 SuperElit	27	14	15	29	72	—	—	—	—	—
1998–99	Örnsköldsviks SK	Division 1	31	7	15	22	46	—	—	—	—	—
1999–00	Modo Hockey	Elitserien	11	0	0	0	4	7	0	0	0	0
1999–00	Modo Hockey J20	J20 SuperElit	3	0	3	3	6	—	—	—	—	—
1999–00	IF Sundsvall Hockey	Allsvenskan	31	10	11	21	26	—	—	—	—	—
2000–01	Modo Hockey J20	J20 SuperElit	1	1	0	1	0	—	—	—	—	—
2000–01	Modo Hockey	Elitserien	47	7	1	8	14	5	0	0	0	2
2000–01	IF Sundsvall Hockey	Allsvenskan	2	2	1	3	2	—	—	—	—	—
2001–02	Modo Hockey	Elitserien	38	3	1	4	26	9	0	0	0	0
2001–02	IF Sundsvall Hockey	Allsvenskan	2	2	1	3	2	—	—	—	—	—
2001–02	IF Björklöven	Allsvenskan	6	1	0	1	12	—	—	—	—	—
2002–03	Modo Hockey J20	J20 SuperElit	1	0	2	2	0	—	—	—	—	—
2002–03	Modo Hockey	Elitserien	46	4	4	8	55	6	1	1	2	6
2003–04	Modo Hockey	Elitserien	41	6	9	15	26	6	0	2	2	4
2004–05	Modo Hockey J20	J20 SuperElit	2	0	0	0	2	—	—	—	—	—
2004–05	Modo Hockey	Elitserien	41	1	3	4	22	5	0	0	0	2
2005–06	Timrå IK	Elitserien	49	13	9	22	22	—	—	—	—	—
2006–07	Timrå IK	Elitserien	48	10	21	31	53	6	1	4	5	4
2007–08	Modo Hockey	Elitserien	51	9	18	27	24	5	2	2	4	2
2008–09	Modo Hockey	Elitserien	39	5	12	17	10	—	—	—	—	—
2009–10	Skellefteå AIK	Elitserien	46	7	15	22	47	12	5	2	7	12
2010–11	Skellefteå AIK	Elitserien	50	11	19	30	30	16	2	2	4	8
2011–12	Dinamo Riga	KHL	49	10	7	17	59	1	0	0	0	0
2012–13	Rögle BK	Elitserien	34	4	5	9	10	—	—	—	—	—
2013–14	ERC Ingolstadt	DEL	22	1	5	6	29	—	—	—	—	—
2013–14	Brynäs IF	SHL	17	2	0	2	8	—	—	—	—	—
Elitserien/SHL totals			558	82	117	199	351	77	11	13	24	40
