= 1997–98 Euro Hockey Tour =

Tournament details
- Dates: 28 August 1997 – 26 April 1998
- Teams: 4

Final positions
- Champions: Czech Republic (1st title)
- Runners-up: Sweden
- Third place: Finland
- Fourth place: Russia

Tournament statistics
- Games played: 24
- Goals scored: 130 (5.42 per game)
- Attendance: 144,113 (6,005 per game)

The 1997–98 Euro Hockey Tour was the second season of the Euro Hockey Tour. The season consisted of four tournaments, the Pragobanka Cup, Karjala Tournament, Baltica Brewery Cup, and the Sweden Hockey Games. The games Canada participated in did not count towards the final standings of the tournament.

== Standings ==
Pos	Team	Pld	W	D	L	GF	GA	GD	Pts
1	Czech Republic	12	7	2	3	47	29	+18	16
2	Sweden	12	5	3	4	30	34	−4	13
3	Finland	12	4	3	5	36	33	+3	11
4	Russia	12	3	2	7	17	34	−17	8

Source: hokej

== Pragobanka Cup ==
The tournament was played between 28–31 August 1997. All of the matches were played in Zlín, Czech Republic. The tournament was won by Czech Republic.

Pos	Team	Pld	W	D	L	GF	GA	GD	Pts
1	Czech Republic	3	3	0	0	16	5	+11	9
2	Finland	3	1	1	1	13	9	+4	4
3	Russia	3	1	1	1	6	9	−3	4
4	Russia	3	1	1	1	6	9	−3	4

Source: swehockey

28 August 1997
Sweden	1–8	Finland
Czech Republic	5–0	Russia
29 August 1997
Finland	2–2	Russia
30 August 1997
Sweden	1–5	Czech Republic
31 August 1997
Russia	4–2	Sweden
Czech Republic	6–3	Finland

== Karjala Tournament ==
The tournament was played between 6–9 November 1997. All of the matches were played in Helsinki, Finland. The tournament was won by Sweden.

Pos	Team	Pld	W	D	L	GF	GA	GD	Pts
1	Sweden	3	3	0	0	9	3	+6	6
2	Czech Republic	3	1	0	2	5	4	+1	2
3	Russia	3	1	0	2	4	6	−2	2
4	Finland	3	1	0	2	7	12	−5	2

Source: hokej

7 November 1997
Sweden	1–0	Czech Republic
Finland	3–2	Russia
9 November 1997
Russia	1–3	Sweden
Finland	2–5	Czech Republic
10 November 1997
Czech Republic	0–1	Russia
Finland	2–5	Sweden

== Baltica Brewery Cup ==
The tournament was played between 17–21 December 1997. All of the matches were played in Moscow, Russia. The tournament was won by Czech Republic.

Pos	Team	Pld	W	D	L	GF	GA	GD	Pts
1	Czech Republic	3	1	2	0	17	11	+6	5
2	Russia	3	1	1	1	3	8	−5	4
3	Sweden	3	1	1	1	8	7	+1	4
4	Finland	3	0	2	1	7	9	−2	2

Source: swehockey

17 December 1997
Czech Republic	4–4	Finland
Russia	0–0	Sweden
18 December 1997
Czech Republic	6–6	Sweden
Finland	1–2	Russia
20 December 1997
Sweden	1–3	Finland
Russia	1–7	Czech Republic
21 December 1997 (3rd Place and Final)
Finland	1–2	Sweden
Czech Republic	1–0	Russia

== Sweden Hockey Games ==
The tournament was played between 21–26 April 1998. All of the matches were played in Stockholm, Sweden. The tournament was won by Sweden.

Pos	Team	Pld	W	D	L	GF	GA	GD	Pts
1	Sweden	4	3	1	0	14	6	+8	10
2	Czech Republic	4	3	0	1	12	11	+1	9
3	Finland	4	2	1	1	11	7	+4	7
4	Russia	4	1	0	3	6	12	−6	3
5	Canada	4	0	0	4	6	13	−7	0

Source: swehockey

21 April 1998
Finland	2–3	Czech Republic
Russia	1–3	Sweden
22 April 1998
Canada	2–3	Czech Republic
Finland	4–0	Russia
23 April 1998
Sweden	5–1	Canada
24 April 1998
Czech Republic	4–3	Russia
25 April 1998
Canada	2–3	Finland
Czech Republic	2–4	Sweden
26 April 1998
Russia	2–1	Canada
Sweden	2–2	Finland
