= Adam Svoboda =

Czech ice hockey player and coach

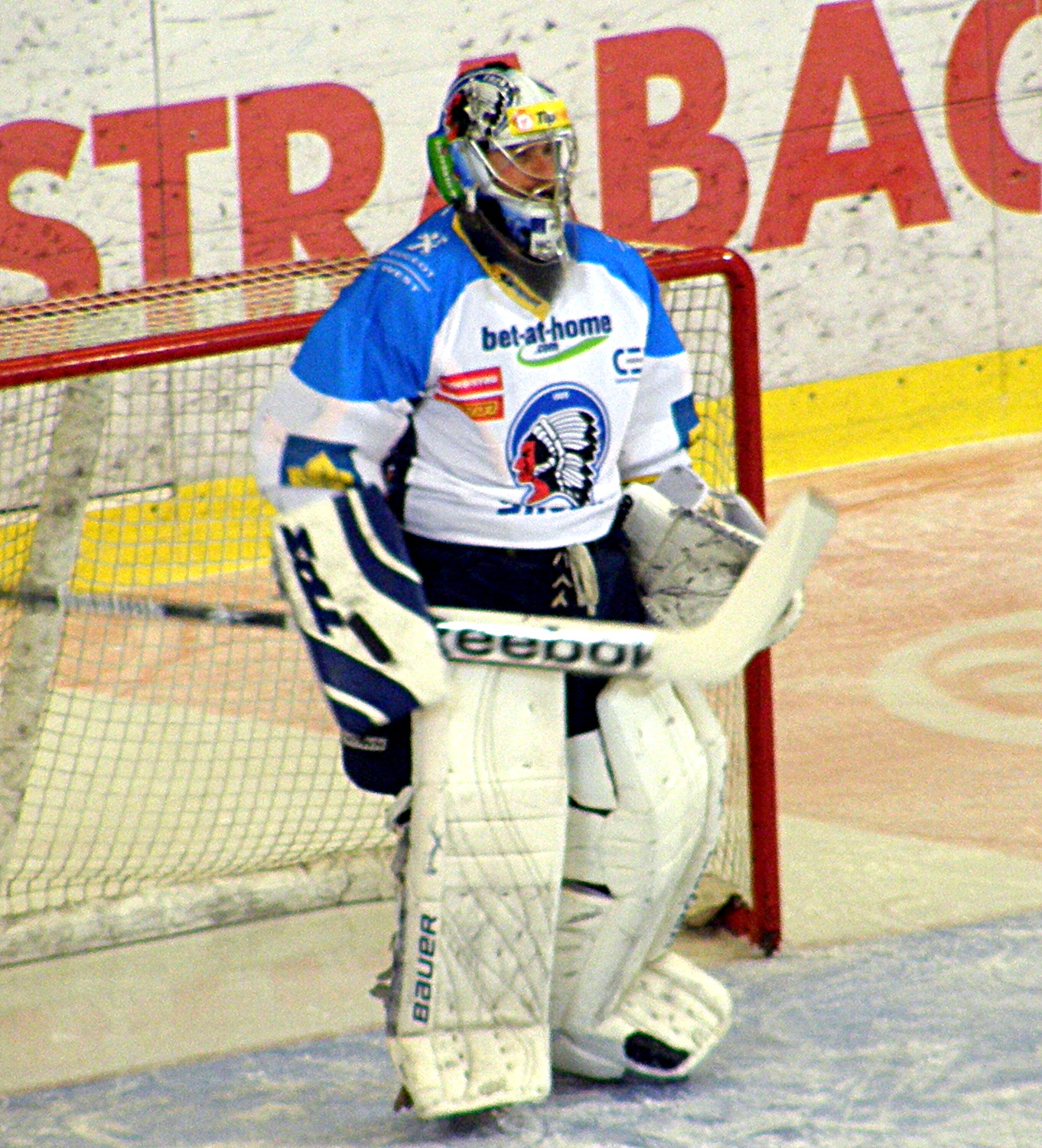
- Svoboda in December 2011
- Born: 26 January 1978 Brno, Czechoslovakia
- Died: 7 May 2019 (aged 41) Pardubice, Czech Republic
- Height: 5 ft 9 in (175 cm)
- Weight: 176 lb (80 kg; 12 st 8 lb)
- Position: Goaltender
- Caught: Left
- Played for: HC Sparta Praha; HC Pardubice; Nürnberg Ice Tigers; HC Lada Togliatti; Timrå IK; HC Slavia Praha; Avangard Omsk; HC Plzeň; HC Hradec Králové; Beibarys Atyrau
- National team: Czech Republic
- Playing career: 1996–2017

Adam Svoboda (26 January 1978 – 7 May 2019) was a Czech ice hockey goaltender and coach.

== Club career ==
Svoboda began his professional career with HC Sparta Praha, starting in 25 games for the club throughout the 1996-97 Czech Extraliga season. He spent the next few years in Pardubice, before leaving for the Nürnberg Ice Tigers in 2004. After brief stints in Russia and Sweden, he returned to the Czech Extraliga at the end of the 2005-06 season.

Svoboda won his first Extraliga title in 2008 with HC Slavia Praha, and later a second one five years later, this time as a member of the HC Škoda Plzeň. He retired at the age of 39 in 2017, spending the final season of his career in Kazakhstan.

== International ==
Svoboda was a part of the Czech national team at four different IIHF World Championships, taking home the gold in 2005 and a silver medal a year later. Throughout his career, he also represented his country at numerous smaller international tournaments, including the Euro Hockey Tour.

== Death ==
Svoboda was found dead by police on 7 May 2019. Officers at the scene ruled out foul play, the probable cause of death being suicide by hanging. He was 41 years old.

A few months prior to his passing, Svoboda was fired from his coaching job with the Czech national under-18 team after he crashed his car while driving under the influence.
