= 2002 Baltika Cup =

Tournament details
- Host countries: Russia; Finland
- Cities: Moscow; Espoo
- Venues: 2 (in 2 host cities)
- Dates: 16–22 December 2002
- Teams: 5

Final positions
- Champions: Czech Republic (3rd title)
- Runners-up: Finland
- Third place: Russia
- Fourth place: Slovakia

Tournament statistics
- Games played: 10
- Goals scored: 43 (4.3 per game)
- Attendance: 40,700 (4,070 per game)
- Scoring leader: (Czech Republic) Michal Mikeska (5 points)

Awards
- MVP: (Finland) Eero Somervuori

The 2002 Baltika Cup was played between 16 and 22 December 2002. The Czech Republic, Finland, Sweden and Russia played a round-robin for a total of three games per team and six games in total. Five of the matches were played in Luzhniki Palace of Sports in Moscow, Russia and one match in LänsiAuto Areena in Espoo, Finland. Czech Republic won the tournament. The tournament was part of the 2002–03 Euro Hockey Tour.

== Standings ==
| Pos | Team | Pld | W | OTW | SOW | OTL | SOL | L | GF | GA | GD | Pts |
|---|---|---|---|---|---|---|---|---|---|---|---|---|
| 1 | Czech Republic | 4 | 2 | 0 | 1 | 0 | 1 | 0 | 14 | 8 | +6 | 9 |
| 2 | Finland | 4 | 3 | 0 | 0 | 0 | 0 | 1 | 10 | 5 | +5 | 9 |
| 3 | Russia | 4 | 2 | 0 | 1 | 0 | 0 | 1 | 11 | 7 | +4 | 8 |
| 4 | Slovakia | 4 | 1 | 0 | 0 | 0 | 0 | 3 | 6 | 14 | −8 | 3 |
| 5 | Sweden | 4 | 0 | 0 | 0 | 0 | 1 | 3 | 2 | 9 | −7 | 1 |

Source: swehockey

== Games ==
All times are local. Moscow – (Moscow Time – UTC+4) Espoo – (Eastern European Time – UTC+2)

| 16 December 2002; 18:30 | Finland | 4-1 (0-1, 3-0, 1-0) | Slovakia | LänsiAuto Areena, Espoo; Attendance: 6,000 |

Game reference
| | Goalies | Miroslav Šimonovič | Referee: (Russia) Zaitsev; Linesmen: (Russia) Nokisalmi (Russia) Saarnio |
| Santala (Somervuori, Peltonen) – 20:45; Saarela (Tähtinen, Torkki) – 21:40; Kuki (Pihlman) – 24:20; Söderholm (Tähtinen, Tukio) – 49:28 / Goals / 02:13 – Škovira | | | Referee: (Russia) Zaitsev; Linesmen: (Russia) Nokisalmi (Russia) Saarnio |
| 6 min | Penalties | 8 min | Referee: (Russia) Zaitsev; Linesmen: (Russia) Nokisalmi (Russia) Saarnio |
| 40 | Shots | 15 | Referee: (Russia) Zaitsev; Linesmen: (Russia) Nokisalmi (Russia) Saarnio |

| 16 December 2002; 18:30 | Sweden | 0-3 (0-1, 0-1, 0-1) | Russia | Luzhniki Palace of Sports, Moscow; Attendance: 5,000 |

Game reference

Stefan Liv
Goalies
Maxim Sokolov
Referee:
(Czech Republic) Milan Minar

| 0-1 | 19:21 – Suglobov (Soin) |
| 0-2 | 35:53 – Proshkin (Zinovjev, Soin) |
| 0-3 | 53:16 – Suglobov (Soin) |

12 min
Penalties
6 min
21
Shots
29

| 17 December 2002; 18:30 | Sweden | 1-2 GWS (1-1, 0-0, 0-0) (OT: 0-0) (SO: 0-1) | Czech Republic | Luzhniki Palace of Sports, Moscow; Attendance: 1,500 |

Game reference
| Henrik Lundqvist | Goalies | Adam Svoboda | Referee: (Russia) Vyacheslav Bulanov |
| Sundin (Johansson) – 10:55 / 1-0; / 1-1 / 19:13 – Balaštík (Mikeska) | | | Referee: (Russia) Vyacheslav Bulanov |
| Kahnberg (miss); Davidsson (miss) | Shootout | (miss) Moravec; Balaštík | Referee: (Russia) Vyacheslav Bulanov |
| 18 min | Penalties | 20 min | Referee: (Russia) Vyacheslav Bulanov |
| 31 | Shots | 26 | Referee: (Russia) Vyacheslav Bulanov |

| 18 December 2002; 15:00 | Czech Republic | 6-1 (1-1, 4-0, 1-0) | Slovakia | Luzhniki Palace of Sports, Moscow; Attendance: 1,200 |

Game reference

Roman Málek
Goalies
Pavol Rybár
Referee:
(Russia) Vladimir Semenov

| | 0-1 | 02:23 – Milo (Rataj, Sabol) |
| Mikeska (SHG) – 13:14 | 1-1 |
| Mikeska (Tesařík) (PP) – 22:00 | 2-1 |
| Kratěna (Hejda, Blazek) – 33:40 | 3-1 |
| Kotrla (Tesařík, Balaštík) – 35:35 | 4-1 |
| Kántor (Balaštík, Mikeska) – 38:30 | 5-1 |
| Sup (Kratěna, Blazek) – 50:10 | 6-1 |

16 min
Penalties
10 min
32
Shots
14

| 18 December 2002; 18:30 | Russia | 1-3 (0-1, 1-1, 0-1) | Finland | Luzhniki Palace of Sports, Moscow; Attendance: 8,500 |

Game reference

Maxim Sokolov
Goalies
Niklas Bäckström
Referee:
(Czech Republic) Milan Minar
Linesmen:
(Russia) Makarov
(Russia) Konstantin Olenin

| | 0-1 | 19:25 – Söderholm (Tähtinen) (PP) |
| | 0-2 | 35:48 – Somervuori (Santala) |
| Vlasenkov (Zinovjev, Proshkin) (PP) – 37:11 | 1-2 |
| | 1-3 | 42:29 – Hulkkonen (Somervuori) |

6 min
Penalties
12 min
27
Shots
23

| 19 December 2002; 18:30 | Finland | 1-0 (0-0, 0-0, 1-0) | Sweden | Luzhniki Palace of Sports, Moscow; Attendance: 1,500 |

Game reference
| Kimmo Kapanen | Goalies | Stefan Liv | Referee: (Russia) Vjacheslav Bulanov |
| Somervuori (Miettinen, Mikkola) – 40:18 / 1-0 | | | Referee: (Russia) Vjacheslav Bulanov |
| 45 min | Penalties | 18 min | Referee: (Russia) Vjacheslav Bulanov |
| 20 | Shots | 14 | Referee: (Russia) Vjacheslav Bulanov |

| 20 December 2002; 17:00 | Slovakia | 3-1 (0-0, 0-1, 3-0) | Sweden | Luzhniki Palace of Sports, Moscow; Attendance: 1,000 |

Game reference

Miroslav Šimonovič
Goalies
Henrik Lundqvist
Referee:
(Russia) Sergei Semenov
Linesmen:
(Russia) Kamurkin
(Russia) Konstantin Olenin

| | 0-1 | 27:10 – Rhodin (Kahnberg, Hållberg |
| Hanzal (Pavlikovský) – 43:46 | 1-1 |
| Pavlikovský (Čierny, Hanzal) – 59:16 | 2-1 |
| Hlinka (Hlinka) – 59:57 | 3-1 |

12 min
Penalties
20 min
26
Shots
23

| 21 December 2002; 16:00 | Czech Republic | 3-2 (0-1, 3-0, 0-1) | Finland | Luzhniki Palace of Sports, Moscow; Attendance: 3,500 |

Game reference

Adam Svoboda
Goalies
Niklas Bäckström
Referee:
(Russia) Vyacheslav Bulanov
Linesmen:
(Russia) Makarov
(Russia) Kamurkin

| | 0-1 | 05:01 – Tukio (Saarela) (PP) |
| Blažek (Hejda) – 22:21 | 1-1 |
| Sup – 22:46 | 2-1 |
| Mikeska (Kántor) – 30:13 | 3-1 |
| | 3-2 | 48:38 – Kauppila (Kuhta) |

18 min
Penalties
16 min
22
Shots
28

| 21 December 2002; 17:00 | Slovakia | 1-3 (1-0, 0-1, 0-2) | Russia | Luzhniki Palace of Sports, Moscow; Attendance: 4,500 |

Game reference

Pavol Rybár
Goalies
Yegor Podomatsky
Referee:
(Finland) Hannu Henriksson
Linesman:
(Russia) Konstantin Olenin

| Kukumberg (Milo) – 18:11 | 1-0 |
| | 1-1 | 27:28 – Chupin (Subbotin) |
| | 1-2 | 51:05 – Gusev (Suglobov) |
| | 1-3 | 59:54 – Proshkin (Zinovjev) (SHG) |

40 min
Penalties
74 min
10
Shots
32

| 22 December 2002; 12:30 | Russia | 4-3 GWS (2-1, 1-1, 0-1) (OT: 0-0) (SO: 1-0) | Czech Republic | Luzhniki Palace of Sports, Moscow; Attendance: 8,000 |

Game reference

Maxim Sokolov
Goalies
Roman Málek
Referee:
(Finland) Hannu Henriksson
Linesman:
(Russia) Konstantin Olenin

| Proshkin (Antipov) (PP) – 08:31 | 1-0 |
| Skopintsev (Subbotin, Chupin) (PP) – 14:52 | 2-0 |
| | 2-1 | 17:25 – Kántor (Kratěna) |
| Gorovikov (Suglobov) – 21:59 | 3-1 |
| | 3-2 | 34:40 – Jan Marek |
| | 3-3 | 46:25 – Kucharczyk |

Dobryshkin (miss)
Zinovjev
Shootout
(miss) Duda
(miss) Balaštík
18 min
Penalties
46 min
28
Shots
22

== Scoring leaders ==
| Pos | Player | Country | GP | G | A | Pts | +/− | PIM | POS |
|---|---|---|---|---|---|---|---|---|---|
| 1 | Michal Mikeska | Czech Republic | 4 | 3 | 2 | 5 | +6 | 2 | CE |
| 2 | Vitali Proshkin | Russia | 4 | 3 | 1 | 4 | +2 | 0 | LD |
| 3 | Eero Somervuori | Finland | 4 | 2 | 2 | 4 | +4 | 0 | RW |
| 3 | Aleksander Suglobov | Russia | 4 | 2 | 2 | 4 | +4 | 2 | LW |
| 5 | Jaroslav Balaštík | Czech Republic | 4 | 2 | 2 | 4 | +5 | 6 | LW |

GP = Games played; G = Goals; A = Assists; Pts = Points; +/− = Plus/minus; PIM = Penalties in minutes; POS = Position
Source: swehockey

== Goaltending leaders ==
| Pos | Player | Country | TOI | GA | GAA | Sv% | SO |
|---|---|---|---|---|---|---|---|
| 1 | Adam Svoboda | Czech Republic | 125:00 | 2 | 0.96 | 96.67 | 0 |
| 2 | Miroslav Šimonovič | Slovakia | 120:00 | 2 | 1.00 | 96.15 | 0 |
| 3 | Henrik Lundqvist | Sweden | 124:44 | 4 | 1.92 | 92.31 | 0 |
| 4 | Stefan Liv | Sweden | 119:20 | 4 | 2.01 | 91.84 | 0 |

TOI = Time on ice (minutes:seconds); SA = Shots against; GA = Goals against; GAA = Goals Against Average; Sv% = Save percentage; SO = Shutouts
Source: swehockey

== Tournament awards ==
The tournament directorate named the following players in the tournament 2002:

- Best goaltender: (Finland) Kimmo Kapanen
- Best defenceman: (Russia) Vitali Proshkin
- Best forward: (Czech Republic) Michal Mikeska
- Most Valuable Player: (Finland) Eero Somervuori

Media All-Star Team:

- Goaltender: (Czech Republic) Adam Svoboda
- Defence: (Finland) Toni Söderholm, (Czech Republic) Radim Tezarik
- Forwards: (Finland) Eero Somervuori, (Czech Republic) Michal Mikeska, (Russia) Aleksander Suglobov
