= 2003 Sweden Hockey Games =

Tournament details
- Host countries: Sweden; Finland
- Cities: Stockholm; Helsinki
- Venues: 2 (in 2 host cities)
- Dates: 4-9 February 2003
- Teams: 5

Final positions
- Champions: Russia (1st title)
- Runners-up: Sweden
- Third place: Canada
- Fourth place: Finland

Tournament statistics
- Games played: 10
- Goals scored: 51 (5.1 per game)
- Attendance: 67,741 (6,774 per game)
- Scoring leader: (Sweden) Niklas Andersson (5 points)

The 2003 Sweden Hockey Games was played between 4 and 9 February 2003 in Stockholm, Sweden. The Czech Republic, Finland, Sweden, Russia and Canada played a round-robin for a total of four games per team and 10 games in total. Five of the matches were played in the Globen in Stockholm, Sweden, and one match in the Hartwall Arena in Helsinki, Finland. The tournament was won by Russia. The tournament was part of 2002–03 Euro Hockey Tour.

Games against Canada was not included in the 2002–03 Euro Hockey Tour.

== Standings ==
Pos	Team	Pld	W	OTW	OTL	L	GF	GA	GD	Pts
1	Russia	4	3	1	0	0	14	7	+7	11
2	Sweden	4	1	1	1	1	11	10	+1	6
3	Canada	4	1	0	2	1	11	15	−4	5
4	Finland	4	0	2	1	1	6	10	−4	5
5	Czech Republic	4	0	1	1	2	9	9	0	3

Source: swehockey

== Games ==
All times are local. Stockholm – (Central European Time – UTC+1) Helsinki – (Eastern European Time – UTC+2)

4 February 2003; 17:30	Finland	1-0 OT (0–0, 0–0, 0–0) (OT: 1–0)	Czech Republic	Hartwall Areena, Helsinki; Attendance: 6,326

Game reference
Kimmo Kapanen	Goalies	Roman Málek	Referee: (Sweden) Lars-Johan Ryhed; Linesmen: (Finland) Antti Hämäläinen (Finland) Stefan Fonselius
61:56 – Tuomas Pihlman (Markku Tähtinen, Mikko Luoma) / 1-0			Referee: (Sweden) Lars-Johan Ryhed; Linesmen: (Finland) Antti Hämäläinen (Finland) Stefan Fonselius
8 min	Penalties	8 min	Referee: (Sweden) Lars-Johan Ryhed; Linesmen: (Finland) Antti Hämäläinen (Finland) Stefan Fonselius
33	Shots	23	Referee: (Sweden) Lars-Johan Ryhed; Linesmen: (Finland) Antti Hämäläinen (Finland) Stefan Fonselius

4 February 2003; 19:00	Sweden	4-3 GWS (1-2, 1-0, 1-1) (OT: 0–0) (SO: 1–0)	Canada	Globen, Stockholm; Attendance: 7,783

Game reference

Daniel Henriksson
Goalies
Joaquin Gage
Referee:
(Finland) Hannu Henriksson
Linesmen:
(Sweden) Mikael Ljungqvist
(Sweden) Nicklas Smedman

	0-1	01:00 – Michael Henrich
06:25 – Mika Hannula (Thomas Rhodin)	1-1
	1-2	07:19 – Nathan Smith (Jamie Heward)
22:36 – Niklas Andersson (Jari Tolsa)	2-2
42:54 – Magnus Johansson (PP)	3-2
	3-3	55:10 – David Nemirovsky (Chris Armstrong)

Andersson
Shootout
(miss) Lombardi
2 min
Penalties
33 min
51
Shots
23

5 February 2003; 19:00	Russia	4-1 (2-0, 0-1, 2-0)	Canada	Globen, Stockholm; Attendance: 2,072

Game reference

Andrei Tsaryov
Goalies
Jamie Hodson
Referee:
(Sweden) Lars-Johan Ryhed
Linesmen:
(Sweden) Fredrik Ulriksson
(Sweden) Johan Andersson

01:40 – Vasili Turkovsky (Alexei Tereshchenko)	1-0
13:04 – Aleksander Suglobov (Sergei Soin)	2-0
	2-1	30:45 – Paul DiPietro (Michael Henrich)
47:20 – Ruslan Bernikov (Sergei Gusev)	3-1
57:36 – Dmitri Erofeyev (Sergei Zinovjev)	4-1

10 min
Penalties
18 min
33
Shots
22

6 February 2003; 15:30	Finland	2-3 OT (0-0, 1-1, 1-1) (OT: 0–0)	Russia	Globen, Stockholm; Attendance: 1,156

Game reference

Ari Sulander
Goalies
Yegor Podomatsky
Referee:
(Sweden) Thomas Andersson
Linesmen:
(Sweden) Anders Karlberg
(Sweden) Leo Takula

	0-1	27:46 – Sergei Krivokrasov
31:44 – Sami Torkki (Jukka Voutilainen) (PP)	1-1
48:19 – Marko Kiprusoff (Juha Ylönen, Juha Lind) (PP)	2-1
	2-2	56:55 – Aleksander Suglobov (Sergei Vyshedkevich)
	2-3	60:19 – Sergei Krivokrasov (Sergei Vyshedkevich)

10 min
Penalties
10 min
20
Shots
26

6 February 2003; 19:00	Sweden	4-1 (2-1, 1-0, 1-0)	Czech Republic	Globen, Stockholm; Attendance: 7,529

Game reference

Henrik Lundqvist
Goalies
Adam Svoboda
Referee:
(Finland) Hannu Henriksson
Linesmen:
(Sweden) Mikael Ljungqvist
(Sweden) Nicklas Smedman

06:01 – Niklas Andersson (Magnus Johansson)	1-0
11:26 – Johan Davidsson (Ronnie Sundin)	2-0
	2-1	19:51 – Libor Procházka (Radim Tesařík)
32:15 – Johan Davidsson (Petri Liimatainen)	3-1
59:55 – Magnus Kahnberg (Jari Tolsa)	4-1

16 min
Penalties
14 min
33
Shots
20

7 February 2003; 19:00	Czech Republic	3-2 GWS (1-1, 0-1, 1-0) (OT: 0–0) (SO: 1–0)	Canada	Globen, Stockholm; Attendance: 2,831

Game reference

Roman Málek
Goalies
Joaquin Gage
Referee:
(Sweden) Ulf Rådbjer
Linesmen:
(Sweden) Fredrik Ulriksson
(Sweden) Joacim Karlsson

04:29 – Michal Sýkora (PP)	1-0
	1-1	18:29 – Mike Maneluk (David Nemirovsky)
	1-2	33:53 – Chuck Kobasew (Jamie Heward) (PP)
41:56 – Tomáš Blažek (Petr Tenkrát, Pavel Kolařík)	2-2

Hudler (miss)
Blažek (miss)
Hudler
Shootout
(miss) Maneluk
(miss) Kobasew
(miss) Maneluk
18 min
Penalties
22 min
41
Shots
31

8 February 2003; 12:00	Canada	5-4 (3-2, 2-1, 0-1)	Finland	Globen, Stockholm; Attendance: 9,673

Game reference

Jamie Hodson
Goalies
Niklas Bäckström
Referee:
(Russia) Vyacheslav Bulanov
Linesmen:
(Sweden) Fredrik Ulriksson
(Sweden) Mikael Ljungqvist

	0-1	03:52 – Esa Pirnes (Mikko Luoma, Tuukka Mäntylä) (PP)
10:36 – Shane Peacock (Darryl Shannon)	1-1
11:24 – Craig Ferguson (David Nemirovsky)	2-1
15:36 – Jamie Heward (Matthew Lombardi) (PP)	3-1
	3-2	16:56 – Juha Lind (Marko Kiprusoff)
27:51 – David Nemirovsky	4-2
30:38 – Shane Peacock (David Nemirovsky)	5-2
	5-3	33:58 – Antti-Jussi Niemi (Kimmo Rintanen, Jukka Hentunen)
	5-4	55:19 – Marko Kiprusoff (Kimmo Rintanen, Niklas Bäckström)

18 min
Penalties
10 min
13
Shots
41

8 February 2003; 15:30	Russia	4-2 (1-1, 2-0, 1-1)	Sweden	Globen, Stockholm; Attendance: 13,850

Game reference

Andrei Tsaryov
Goalies
Daniel Henriksson
Referee:
(Czech Republic) Frantisek Rejthar
Linesmen:
(Sweden) Anders Karlberg
(Sweden) Leo Takula

	0-1	06:59 – Niklas Andersson (Johan Davidsson, [[]])
18:31 – Sergei Krivokrasov (Sergei Vyshedkevich, Alexei Chupin)	1-1
25:30 – Igor Grigorenko (Vladimir Antipov)	2-1
39:27 – Igor Grigorenko (Alexei Chupin)	3-1
	3-2	41:49 – Niklas Nordgren (Jonas Rönnqvist, Mathias Tjärnqvist)
59:43 – Igor Grigorenko (Sergei Krivokrasov)	4-2

2 min
Penalties
6 min
18
Shots
32

9 February 2003; 13:00	Czech Republic	2-3 (0-0, 1-2, 1-1)	Russia	Globen, Stockholm; Attendance: 2,671

Game reference

Adam Svoboda
Goalies
Yegor Podomatsky
Referee:
(Sweden) Christer
Linesmen:
(Sweden) Anders Karlberg Lärking
(Sweden) Nicklas Smedman

	0-1	30:02 – Sergei Zinovjev (Aleksander Suglobov)
33:44 – Tomáš Kucharčík (Tomáš Vlasák)	1-1
	1-2	34:30 – Sergei Zinovjev
	1-3	43:51 – Vladimir Antipov (Aleksander Suglobov, Sergei Zinovjev)
45:01 – Petr Kadlec (František Kučera)	2-3

10 min
Penalties
6 min
34
Shots
27

9 February 2003; 17:00	Sweden	1-2 GWS (1-0, 0-1, 0-0) (OT: 0–0) (SO: 0–1) GWS	Finland	Globen, Stockholm; Attendance: 13,850

Game reference
Henrik Lundqvist	Goalies	Ari Sulander	Referee: (Russia) Vyacheslav Bulanov; Linesmen: (Sweden) Mikael Ljungqvist (Sweden) Leo Takula
04:50 – Jonas Rönnqvist (Niklas Andersson, Niklas Nordgren) / 1-0; / 1-1 / 23:31 – Juha Ylönen (Marko Kiprusoff, Markku Tähtinen) (PP)			Referee: (Russia) Vyacheslav Bulanov; Linesmen: (Sweden) Mikael Ljungqvist (Sweden) Leo Takula
Andersson (miss)	Shootout	Nummelin	Referee: (Russia) Vyacheslav Bulanov; Linesmen: (Sweden) Mikael Ljungqvist (Sweden) Leo Takula
14 min	Penalties	12 min	Referee: (Russia) Vyacheslav Bulanov; Linesmen: (Sweden) Mikael Ljungqvist (Sweden) Leo Takula
29	Shots	32	Referee: (Russia) Vyacheslav Bulanov; Linesmen: (Sweden) Mikael Ljungqvist (Sweden) Leo Takula

== Scoring leaders ==
Pos	Player	Country	GP	G	A	Pts	+/−	PIM	POS
1	Niklas Andersson	Sweden	4	4	1	5	+5	2	LW
2	David Nemirovsky	Canada	4	2	3	5	+5	0	RW
2	Sergei Zinovjev	Russia	4	2	3	5	+5	0	CE
4	Sergei Krivokrasov	Russia	4	3	1	4	+6	2	RW
5	Marko Kiprusoff	Finland	4	2	2	4	+1	0	LD

GP = Games played; G = Goals; A = Assists; Pts = Points; +/− = Plus/minus; PIM = Penalties in minutes; POS = Position
Source: swehockey

== Goaltending leaders ==
Pos	Player	Country	TOI	GA	GAA	Sv%	SO
1	Roman Málek	Czech Republic	126:56	3	1.42	95.31	0
2	Andrei Tsaryov	Russia	120:00	3	1.50	94.44	0
3	Henrik Lundqvist	Sweden	125:01	3	1.44	94.23	0
4	Ari Sulander	Finland	125:19	4	1.92	92.73	0
5	Yegor Podomatsky	Russia	120:19	4	1.99	92.59	0
6	Joaquin Gage	Canada	130:02	7	3.23	92.39	0
7	Adam Svoboda	Czech Republic	118:47	6	3.03	89.83	0
8	Jamie Hodson	Canada	120:00	8	4.00	89.19	0
9	Daniel Henriksson	Sweden	124:30	6	2.89	85.00	0

TOI = Time on ice (minutes:seconds); SA = Shots against; GA = Goals against; GAA = Goals Against Average; Sv% = Save percentage; SO = Shutouts
Source: swehockey

== Tournament awards ==
The tournament directorate named the following players in the tournament 2003:

- Best goalkeeper: (Russia) Andrei Tsaryov
- Best defenceman: (Russia) Sergei Vyshedkevich
- Best forward: (Sweden) Niklas Andersson

Media All-Star Team:

- Goaltender: (Russia) Andrei Tsaryov
- Defence: (Russia) Sergei Vyshedkevich, (Finland) Marko Kiprusoff
- Forwards: (Russia) Igor Grigorenko, (Czech Republic) Jiří Hudler, (Sweden) Niklas Andersson
