= 2003–04 Euro Hockey Tour =

Tournament details
- Dates: 4 September 2003 – 18 April 2004
- Teams: 4

Final positions
- Champions: Finland (6th title)
- Runners-up: Sweden
- Third place: Czech Republic
- Fourth place: Russia

Tournament statistics
- Games played: 28
- Goals scored: 106 (3.79 per game)
- Attendance: 158,267 (5,652 per game)
- Scoring leader: (Czech Republic) Jaroslav Hlinka (5 points)

The 2003–04 Euro Hockey Tour was the eighth season of the Euro Hockey Tour. The season consisted of four tournaments, the Česká Pojišťovna Cup, Karjala Tournament, Baltica Brewery Cup, and the Sweden Hockey Games. The top two teams met in the final, and the third and fourth place teams met for the third place game.

== Standings ==
Pos	Team	Pld	W	OTW	OTL	L	GF	GA	GD	Pts
1	Finland	12	7	0	0	5	29	30	−1	21
2	Sweden	12	4	2	2	4	25	21	+4	18
3	Czech Republic	12	2	4	3	3	24	28	−4	17
4	Russia	12	3	2	3	4	28	27	+1	16

Source: eurohockey

== Česká Pojišťovna Cup ==
The tournament was played between 4–7 September 2003. Five of the matches were played in Pardubice, Czech Republic and one match in Helsinki, Finland. The tournament was won by Finland.

Pos	Team	Pld	W	OTW	OTL	L	GF	GA	GD	Pts
1	Finland	3	2	0	0	1	9	9	0	6
2	Sweden	3	1	1	0	1	5	4	+1	5
3	Russia	3	1	0	1	1	7	6	+1	4
4	Czech Republic	3	0	1	1	1	4	4	0	3

Source: swehockey

4 September 2003
Russia	1–2 (GWS)	Czech Republic
Finland	3–2	Sweden
6 September 2003
Sweden	1–0	Russia
Czech Republic	1–3	Finland
7 September 2003
Finland	3–6	Russia
Czech Republic	1-2	Sweden

== Karjala Tournament ==
The tournament was played between 6–9 November 2003. Five of the matches were played in Helsinki, Finland and one match in Nyköping, Sweden. The tournament was won by Finland.

Pos	Team	Pld	W	OTW	OTL	L	GF	GA	GD	Pts
1	Finland	3	3	0	0	0	12	4	+8	9
2	Czech Republic	3	0	2	0	1	6	8	−2	4
3	Russia	3	1	0	1	1	6	6	0	4
4	Sweden	3	0	0	1	2	2	8	−6	1

Source: flashscore

6 November 2003
Finland	3–2	Russia
Sweden	1–2 (GWS)	Czech Republic
8 November 2003
Russia	2–0	Sweden
Finland	5–1	Czech Republic
9 November 2003
Russia	2–3 (GWS)	Czech Republic
Finland	4-1	Sweden

== Baltica Brewery Cup ==
The tournament was played between 18–21 December 2003. All of the matches were played in Moscow, Russia. The tournament was won by Finland.

Pos	Team	Pld	W	OTW	SOW	OTL	SOL	L	GF	GA	GD	Pts
1	Finland	3	2	0	0	0	0	1	6	7	−1	6
2	Czech Republic	3	1	0	0	0	2	0	9	7	+2	5
3	Russia	3	0	0	2	0	0	1	6	6	0	4
4	Sweden	3	0	0	1	0	1	1	5	6	−1	3

Source: swehockey

18 December 2003
Czech Republic	2–3 (GWS)	Sweden
Russia	1–3	Finland
20 December 2003
Sweden	1–2 (GWS)	Russia
Finland	1–5	Czech Republic
21 December 2003
Russia	3–2 (GWS)	Czech Republic
Finland	2-1	Sweden

== Sweden Hockey Games ==
The tournament was played between 5–8 February 2004. Five of the matches were played in Stockholm, Sweden and one match in Helsinki, Finland. The tournament was won by Sweden.

Pos	Team	Pld	W	OTW	OTL	L	GF	GA	GD	Pts
1	Sweden	3	3	0	0	0	13	3	+10	9
2	Czech Republic	3	1	1	0	1	5	7	−2	5
3	Russia	3	1	1	0	1	9	9	0	5
4	Finland	3	0	0	2	1	2	10	−8	2

Source: swehockey

5 February 2004
Czech Republic	2–1	Finland
Russia	3–5	Sweden
7 February 2004
Finland	1–4	Russia
Sweden	4–0	Czech Republic
8 February 2004
Czech Republic	3–2 (OT)	Russia
Sweden	4-0	Finland

== Final tournament ==
=== 3rd place ===
16 April 2004; 18:30	Russia	1–5 (0–0, 0–3, 1–2)	Czech Republic	Luzhniki Palace of Sports, Moscow; Attendance: 7,500

Game reference

Alexander Fomichev
Goalies
Roman Čechmánek
Referee:
(Finland) Hannu Henriksson

	0-1	21:49 – Bednář (Průcha) (PP)
	0-2	31:22 – Mikeska (Vašíček, Duda)
	0-3	37:22 – Straka
	0-4	47:56 – Vašíček (Mikeska)
	0-5	49:51 – Straka
Pronin – 58:36	1-5

6 min
Penalties
8 min
22
Shots
23

18 April 2004; 17:00	Czech Republic	4–8 OT (2–2, 1–1, 1–4) (OT: 0–1)	Russia	Sazka Arena, Prague; Attendance: 9,315

Game reference

Roman Čechmánek
Goalies
Maxim Sokolov
Referee:
(Sweden) Christer Lärking

Průcha (Hamr) – 01:52	1-0
	1-1	08:28 – Ovechkin (Zelepukin)
Průcha (Dopita, Hlinka) – 14:24	2-1
Hamr (Dopita) – 32:53	3-1
	3-2	14:44 – Zinovjev (Zelepukin)
	3-3	37:04 – Ovechkin (Zelepukin)
	3-4	42:55 – Butsayev
	3-5	47:45 – Proshkin (Bykov) (PP)
Prospal (Výborný) – 52:13	4-5
	4-6	53:54 – Kalinin (Zelepukin)
	4-7	59:52 – Antipov
	4-8	65:40 – Zinovjev

4 min
Penalties
6 min
32
Shots
35

=== Final ===
16 April 2004	Sweden	3–1 (2–0, 1–1, 0–0)	Finland	Globe Arena, Stockholm; Attendance: 10,216

Game reference

Jussi Markkanen
Goalies
Henrik Lundqvist
Referee:
(Russia) Sergei Karabanov
Linesmen:
(Finland) Leo Takula
(Sweden) Mikael Ljungqvist

Salomonsson (Hedström) – 04:42	1-0
Andersson (Tärnström) (PP) – 17:54	2-0
	2-1	21:26 – Peltonen (Kallio)
Hedström (Påhlsson) – 21:42	3-1

16 min
Penalties
18 min
20
Shots
20

18 April 2004	Finland	4–0 OT (1–0, 3–0, 0–0) (OT: 1–0)	Sweden	Hartwall Arena, Helsinki; Attendance: 11,868

Game reference

Mika Noronen
Goalies
Stefan Liv

Nummelin (Jokinen, Kallio) (PP) – 11:39	1-0
Loponen (Pirjetä, Rintanen) (PP) – 29:16	2-0
Hentunen (Nummelin) – 33:09	3-0
Jokinen (Peltonen, Kallio) – 35:01	4-0

22 min
Penalties
28 min
28
Shots
13
