= 2000 Česká pojišťovna Cup =

2000 Česká Pojišťovna Cup
Tournament details
- Host country: Czech Republic
- City: Zlín
- Venues: 2 (in 2 host cities)
- Dates: 31 August - 3 September 2000
- Teams: 4

Final positions
- Champions: Finland (2nd title)
- Runners-up: Sweden
- Third place: Russia
- Fourth place: Czech Republic

Tournament statistics
- Games played: 6
- Goals scored: 29 (4.83 per game)
- Attendance: 14,300 (2,383 per game)
- Scoring leader: (Finland) Jari Kauppila (4 points)

The 2000 Česká Pojišťovna Cup was played between 31 August and 3 September 2000. The Czech Republic, Finland, Sweden and Russia played a round-robin for a total of three games per team and six games in total. Five of the matches were played in Zimní stadion Luďka Čajky in Zlín, Czech Republic, and one match in Hartwall Areena in Helsinki, Finland. The tournament was won by the Finland. The tournament was part of 2000–01 Euro Hockey Tour.

== Standings ==
Pos	Team	Pld	W	OTW	OTL	L	GF	GA	GD	Pts
1	Finland	4	1	1	1	1	9	7	+2	6
2	Sweden	3	1	1	0	1	8	8	0	5
3	Russia	3	1	0	2	0	7	8	−1	5
4	Czech Republic	3	0	1	0	2	5	6	−1	2

Source: swehockey

== Games ==
All times are local. Zlín – (Central European Time – UTC+1) Helsinki – (Eastern European Time – UTC+2)

31 August 2000; 13:30	Russia	3-4 GWS (1-0, 1-3, 1-0) (OT: 0–0) (SO: 0–1)	Finland	Zimní stadion Luďka Čajky, Zlín; Attendance: 500

Game reference

Maxim Sokolov
Goalies
Pasi Nurminen
Referee:
(Czech Republic) Martin Homola

11:48 – Pavel Boychenko (Vasili Turkovsky, Alexandre Boikov)	1-0
	1-1	24:07 – Marko Kiprusoff (Jari Kauppila)
	1-2	29:44 – Jukka Hentunen (Esa Pirnes, Niklas Hagman)
	1-3	31:37 – jari Kauppila (Kimmo Kuhta, Marko Kauppinen)
36:07 – Pavel Boychenko (Sergej Makarov)	2-3
46:31 – Pavel Datsyuk (Alexander Gulyavtsev)	3-3

Shootout
Hentunen
12 min
Penalties
10 min
33
Shots
44

31 August 2000; 17:30	Czech Republic	2-3 (1-0, 0-2, 1-1)	Sweden	Zimní stadion Luďka Čajky, Zlín; Attendance: 4,000

Game reference

Dušan Salfický
Goalies
Mikael Tellqvist
Referee:
(Russia) Sergei Karabanov
Linesman:
(Czech Republic) Stanislav Barvir

15:48 – Martin Chabada (Vladimír Vůjtek, Radek Martínek)	1-0
	1-1	23:43 – Christian Berglund (Jonathan Hedström)
	1-2	35:18 – Christian Berglund (Kristofer Ottosson, Jonathan Hedström)
43:25 – Martin Paroulek (Radim Tesařík)	2-2
	2-3	56:49 – Greger Artursson (Henrik Zetterberg)

20 min
Penalties
22 min
31
Shots
32

1 September 2000; 17:00	Finland	4-2 (2-1, 1-0, 1-1)	Sweden	Zimní stadion Luďka Čajky, Zlín; Attendance: 600

Game reference

Antero Niittymäki
Goalies
Magnus Eriksson
Referee:
(Czech Republic) Martin Homola

	0-1	02:36 – Magnus Wernblom (Mikael Johansson)
12:28 – Niklas Hagman (Esa Pirnes, Jani Nikko)	1-1
16:16 – Jari Kauppila (Kimmo Kuhta)	2-1
26:44 – Teemu Elomo (Lasse Pirjeta, Marko Kauppinen)	3-1
46:01 – Lasse Pirjeta	4-1
	4-2	53:33 – Christian Berglund (Mikael Renberg)

18 min
Penalties
16 min
45
Shots
28

2 September 2000; 15:30	Russia	2-1 (0-1, 2-0, 0-0)	Czech Republic	Zimní stadion Luďka Čajky, Zlín; Attendance: 4,000

Game reference

Denis Khlopotnov
Goalies
Vladimír Hudáček
Referee:
(Finland) Jukka Pakaslahti

	0-1	19:50 – Michal Mikeska (Miroslav Okál, Petr Čajánek)
23:21 – Ravil Yakubov (Dmitri Ryabykin)	1-1
31:27 – Alexander Gulyavtsev (Ravil Yakubov, Dmitri Ryabykin)	2-1

30 min
Penalties
16 min
28
Shots
30

3 September 2000; 13:30	Sweden	3-2 GWS (0-2, 1-0, 1-0) (OT: 0–0) (SO: 1–0)	Russia	Zimní stadion Luďka Čajky, Zlín; Attendance: 400

Game reference

Mikael Tellqvist
Goalies
Maxim Sokolov
Referee:
(Finland) Jukka Pakaslahti

	0-1	05:32 – Dmitri Ryabykin (Ravil Yakubov)
	0-2	16:21 – Alexander Gulyavtsev (Dmitri Ryabykin)
31:17 – Niklas Kronwall (Mikael Renberg)	1-2
40:50 – Henrik Zetterberg (Mathias Johansson)	2-2

Johansson
Shootout

12 min
Penalties
8 min
43
Shots
29

3 September 2000; 17:30	Czech Republic	2-1 OT (1-1, 0-0, 0-0) (OT: 1–0)	Finland	Zimní stadion Luďka Čajky, Zlín; Attendance: 4,800

Game reference

Dušan Salfický
Goalies
Pasi Nurminen
Referee:
(Russia) Sergei Karabanov

14:30 – Miroslav OKÁL (Petr Čajánek, Michal Mikeska)	1-0
	1-1	06:10 – Jukka Hentunen (Jari Kauppila, Kimmo Kuhta)
63:48 - Martin Ručinský (Aleš Píša, Robert Reichel)	2-1

14 min
Penalties
14 min
47
Shots
31

== Scoring leaders ==
Pos	Player	Country	GP	G	A	Pts	+/−	PIM	POS
1	Jari Kauppila	Finland	3	2	2	4	+1	0	F
2	Christian Berglund	Sweden	3	3	0	3	-2	8	F
3	Jukka Hentunen	Finland	3	3	0	3	+2	6	F
4	Kimmo Kuhta	Finland	3	0	3	3	0	0	F
5	Michal Mikeska	Czech Republic	3	1	1	2	+1	0	D

GP = Games played; G = Goals; A = Assists; Pts = Points; +/− = Plus/minus; PIM = Penalties in minutes; POS = Position
Source: quanthockey

== Goaltending leaders ==
Pos	Player	Country	TOI	GA	GAA	Sv%	SO
1	Denis Khlopotnov	Russia	60:00	1	1.00	96.67	0
2	Pasi Nurminen	Finland	129:00	5	2.33	93.75	0
3	Dušan Salfický	Czech Republic	123:00	4	1.95	93.65	0
4	Mikael Tellqvist	Sweden	125:00	4	1.92	93.33	0
5	Vladimír Hudáček	Czech Republic	59:00	2	2.03	92.86	0
5	Antero Niittymäki	Finland	60:00	2	2.00	92.86	0
7	Maxim Sokolov	Russia	130:00	7	3.23	91.95	0
8	Magnus Eriksson	Sweden	60:00	4	4.00	91.11	0

TOI = Time on ice (minutes:seconds); SA = Shots against; GA = Goals against; GAA = Goals Against Average; Sv% = Save percentage; SO = Shutouts
Source: hokej

== Tournament awards ==
The tournament directorate named the following players in the tournament 2000:

- Best goalkeeper: (Sweden) Mikael Tellqvist
- Best defenceman: (Finland) Marko Kiprusoff
- Best forward: (Finland) Jukka Hentunen
