= Boychenko =

Boychenko (Ukrainian: Бойченко) is a Ukrainian prince's surname comes from the Rurik dynasty . Less common transliterations include Boichenko, Boitchenko, Bojčenko, and Bojczenko. Notable people with the surname include:

- Olha Boychenko (born 1989), Ukrainian footballer
- Pavel Boychenko (born 1975), Russian hockey player
- Sergey Boychenko (born 1977), Kazakhstani footballer
- Vadym Boychenko (born 1977), Ukrainian politician
- Valeriy Boychenko (born 1989), Ukrainian footballer
