= DAWG Nation Hockey Foundation =

Humanitarian nonprofit

- Nickname: DAWG Nation
- Established: 2011; 15 years ago
- Founder: Marty Richardson
- Founded at: Littleton, Colorado
- Type: Nonprofit
- Tax ID no.: 27-4394948
- Purpose: Humanitarianism
- Website: dawgnation.org

DAWG Nation Hockey Foundation is a non-profit organization that supports individuals and families within the ice hockey community affected by "catastrophic injury, illness, or death".

== Background ==
The concept for DAWG Nation Hockey Foundation began in 2009, when four friends and adult league hockey teammates of the nonprofit's founder, Marty Richardson, were diagnosed with cancer. The idea started as a small group passing around a hat to raise money for their treatments. The foundation puts on an annual charity tournament known as the Dawg Bowl, which seeks to benefit individuals or families affected by "catastrophic injury, illness, or death". Additionally, the foundation hosts Hockey Heals, a weekly ice time donated by Littleton's Edge Ice Arena, which hosts players with medical conditions attempting to re-gain strength and hockey skills.

Former Colorado Avalanche players Matt Duchene, Jan Hejda, Pierre Turgeon, John-Michael Liles, Milan Hejduk, Kyle Quincey, and John Mitchell are, or have been, involved with the foundation.

== History ==
DAWG Nation Hockey Foundation was founded in 2011 by Marty Richardson. Richardson started the foundation after a teammate's death, looking to raise money for their family. Through September 2014, the organization had raised over $500,000 in donations going towards individuals and their families.

In 2016, DAWG Nation hosted a pond hockey tournament and evening fundraiser at Copper Mountain Resort for Dave Repsher, a former Flight For Life paramedic and local hockey player, who survived a helicopter crash. The tournament featured retired NHL players Milan Hejduk, Derek Armstrong, and Aaron MacKenzie, raising a total of $80,000. The 2016 Dawg Bowl raised over $115,000, distributing checks totaling $219,000 to four individuals in need.

In 2018, DAWG Nation hosted former Humboldt Broncos players and survivors of the team's 2018 bus crash, Ryan Straschnitzki and Jacob Wasserman, inviting them to play sledge hockey at Magness Arena, where the Denver Pioneers play. Additionally, the Colorado Avalanche honored the players during a ceremonial puck drop. The foundation continued to work with former Humboldt Broncos players, including Graysen Cameron, who played in the nonprofit's 9th annual Dawg Bowl in 2019 alongside former professional hockey players Paul Stastny, Jan Hejda, Nate Guenin, Brett Clark, Kyle Quincey, and Peter Sejna. In addition to fundraisers and annual trips made to Humboldt in honor of the Broncos, DAWG Nation created a scholarship program with the Humboldt Broncos. Through 2019, the organization had raised $1.3 million, not counting funds raised through its 2019 Dawg Bowl.

In 2022, DAWG Nation opened its second chapter in St. Louis, Missouri. In that same year, the foundation donated $900,000 to hockey families going through hardship. From its inception to the end of that year, the organization had donated over $4 million to families.

In April 2023, Richardson was named as one of the NHL's Willie O'Ree Community Hero finalists.

In 2024, DAWG Nation hosted a fundraiser for the family of Colin Brown, a St. Louis-based hockey player who died at 16 years old from a gunshot on his way home from a game.

In November 2025, NBC Sports reported on the partnership between DAWG Nation and Declan Farmer, the United States national ice sledge hockey team's all-time leader in points and goals. Farmer and other United States Paralympians have volunteered their time with DAWG Nation. Also in that month, the Colorado Avalanche partnered with artist and DAWG Nation ambassador, Riley Grey-Wolf Alire, to celebrate National American Indian Heritage Month. Through 2025, DAWG Nation raised more than $6 million for hockey families in need.

In January 2026, the DAWG Nation Hockey Foundation organized a fundraiser in support of the SC Flyers, a 12uAA girls hockey team based in Santa Clarita, California, after the team was involved in an automobile accident while traveling to a tournament.
