= Rastislav Pavlikovský =

Slovak ice hockey player

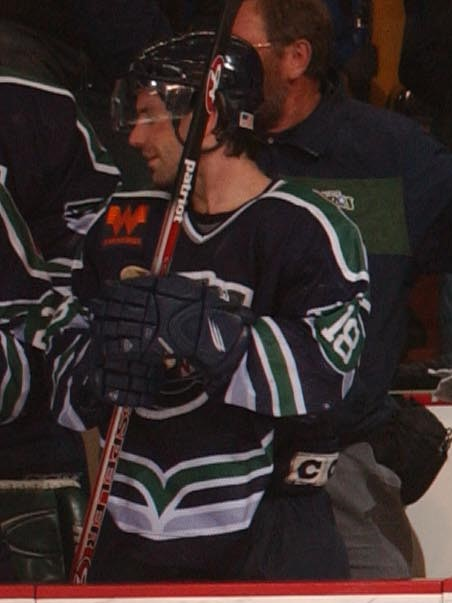
- Born: March 2, 1977 (age 48); Dubnica nad Váhom, Czechoslovakia
- Height: 5 ft 11 in (180 cm)
- Weight: 187 lb (85 kg; 13 st 5 lb)
- Position: Centre
- Shot: Left
- Played for: Slovak Extraliga; HC Dukla Trenčín; SM-liiga; Jokerit; KalPa; Elitserien; HV71; Leksands IF; Mora IK; Modo Hockey; AIK; Kontinental Hockey League; HC Sibir Novosibirsk; National League A ZSC Lions; Czech Extraliga; HC Litvínov
- National team: Slovakia
- NHL draft: 246th overall, 1998; Ottawa Senators
- Playing career: 1993–2017

Rastislav Pavlikovský (born March 2, 1977) is a retired Slovak professional ice hockey centre. He last played for MHK Dubnica in the Slovak 2. Liga.

Pavlikovský was part of the Slovakia men's national ice hockey team which won the 2002 IIHF World Championships. He also competed in the men's tournament at the 2002 Winter Olympics.

He last played the 2012-13 season with Linköping in the Elitserien.

His elder brother Richard is also a hockey international for Slovakia.

== Career statistics ==
=== Regular season and playoffs ===
			Regular season					Playoffs
Season	Team	League	GP	G	A	Pts	PIM	GP	G	A	Pts	PIM
1993–94	Dukla Trenčín	SVK	3	0	1	1	0	—	—	—	—	—
1994–95	Dukla Trenčín	SVK	14	0	7	7	4	6	1	1	2	0
1995–96	Sault Ste. Marie Greyhounds	OHL	13	0	3	3	8	—	—	—	—	—
1995–96	Dukla Trenčín	SVK	22	5	2	7	24	—	—	—	—	—
1995–96	Dukla Trenčín II	SVK II	7	2	5	7	4	—	—	—	—	—
1996–97	Dukla Trenčín	SVK	42	10	13	23	44	—	—	—	—	—
1997–98	Dukla Trenčín	SVK	3	2	1	3	0	—	—	—	—	—
1997–98	Las Vegas Wranglers	IHL	1	0	0	0	0	—	—	—	—	—
1997–98	Utah Grizzlies	IHL	74	17	29	46	54	2	0	0	0	6
1998–99	Cincinnati Mighty Ducks	AHL	36	12	23	35	59	2	0	1	1	4
1998–99	Cincinnati Cyclones	IHL	31	4	12	16	28	—	—	—	—	—
1999–00	Grand Rapids Griffins	IHL	15	0	5	5	24	—	—	—	—	—
1999–00	Philadelphia Phantoms	AHL	12	4	7	11	8	—	—	—	—	—
1999–00	Cincinnati Mighty Ducks	AHL	17	3	5	8	10	—	—	—	—	—
2000–01	Grand Rapids Griffins	IHL	1	0	0	0	0	—	—	—	—	—
2000–01	Jokerit	SM-l	7	0	1	1	0	—	—	—	—	—
2000–01	HV71	SEL	23	6	8	14	93	—	—	—	—	—
2001–02	HV71	SEL	46	14	16	30	102	8	2	2	4	6
2002–03	Houston Aeros	AHL	44	14	13	27	47	23	3	10	13	18
2003–04	Leksands IF	SEL	34	7	14	21	57	10	1	3	4	6
2004–05	Mora IK	SEL	38	12	22	34	44	—	—	—	—	—
2005–06	MODO Hockey	SEL	48	10	22	32	42	5	1	1	2	14
2006–07	ZSC Lions	NLA	43	9	26	35	52	7	1	2	3	8
2007–08	ZSC Lions	NLA	23	6	9	15	16	—	—	—	—	—
2008–09	Sibir Novosibirsk	KHL	46	5	12	17	56	—	—	—	—	—
2009–10	HC Benzina Litvínov	ELH	2	0	0	0	4	—	—	—	—	—
2009–10	Örebro HK	SWE II	23	6	11	17	14	—	—	—	—	—
2010–11	AIK	SEL	44	6	14	20	18	8	1	3	4	10
2011–12	Mora IK	SWE II	11	4	7	11	2	—	—	—	—	—
2011–12	AIK	SEL	24	2	5	7	24	5	0	1	1	6
2012–13	Linköping HC	SEL	10	1	1	2	2	10	0	1	1	2
2013–14	HK Dukla Trenčín	SVK	16	3	14	17	24	—	—	—	—	—
2013–14	KalPa	Liiga	15	0	2	2	8	—	—	—	—	—
2016–17	MHK Dubnica	SVK III	11	3	15	18	12	—	—	—	—	—
SVK totals			100	20	38	58	96	6	1	1	2	0
IHL totals			122	21	46	67	106	2	0	0	0	6
SEL totals			267	58	102	160	382	46	5	11	16	44

=== International ===
Year	Team	Event	GP	G	A	Pts	PIM
1994	Slovakia	EJC C	6	8	11	19	6
1995	Slovakia	EJC B	5	8	8	16	18
1995	Slovakia	WJC B	7	1	1	2	4
1997	Slovakia	WJC	6	2	7	9	6
2002	Slovakia	OG	4	2	3	5	6
2002	Slovakia	WC	9	2	4	6	14
2004	Slovakia	WCH	2	0	0	0	2
2004	Slovakia	WC	9	1	1	2	6
2006	Slovakia	WC	7	1	6	7	4
2009	Slovakia	WC	4	0	0	0	0
Senior totals			35	6	14	20	32
