= Ken Klee =

American ice hockey player and coach (born 1971)

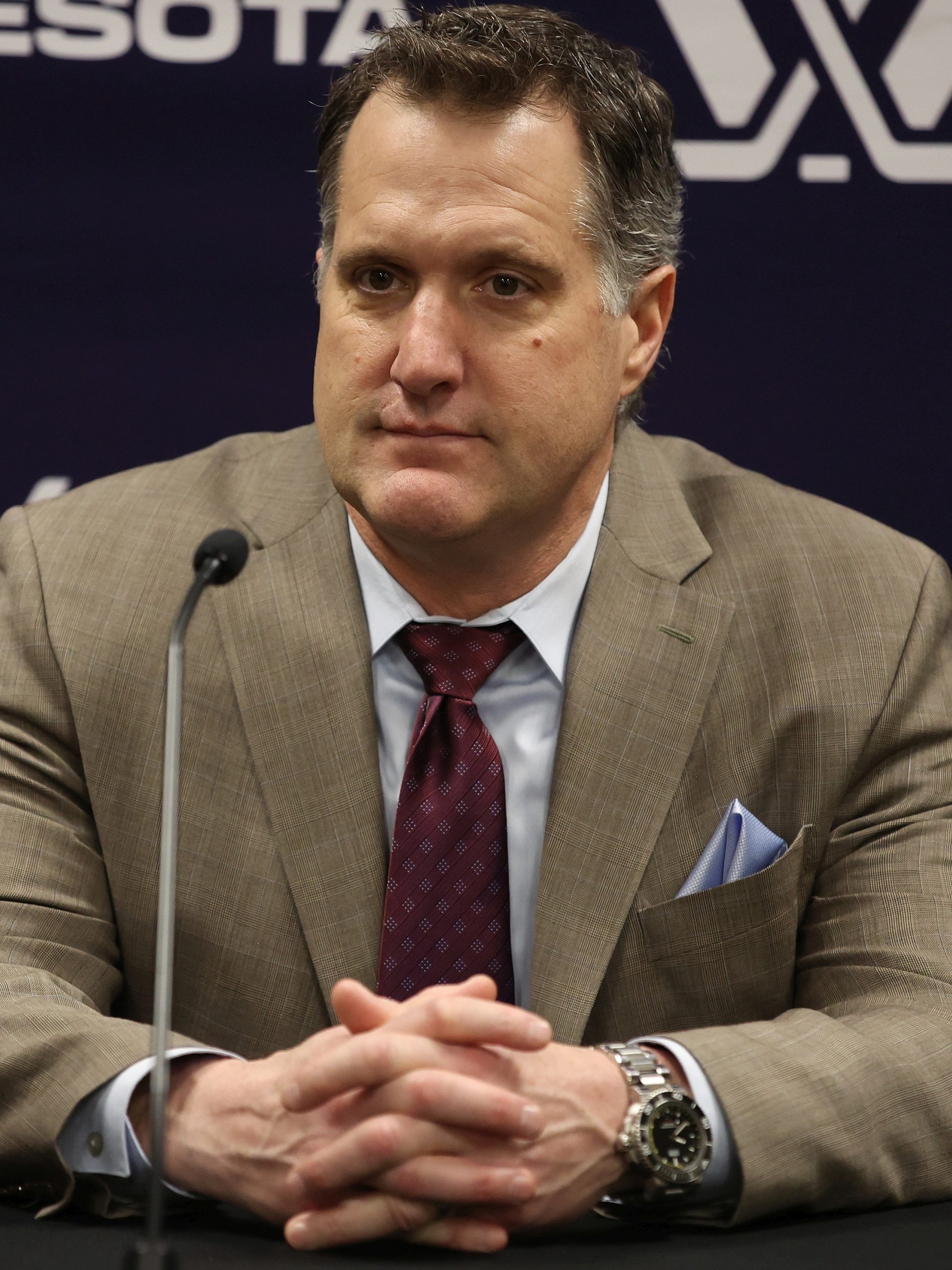
- Klee with PWHL Minnesota in 2024
- Born: April 24, 1971 (age 55) Indianapolis, Indiana, U.S.
- Height: 6 ft 0 in (183 cm)
- Weight: 210 lb (95 kg; 15 st 0 lb)
- Position: Defense
- Shot: Right
- Played for: Washington Capitals; Toronto Maple Leafs; New Jersey Devils; Colorado Avalanche; Atlanta Thrashers; Anaheim Ducks; Phoenix Coyotes
- National team: United States
- NHL draft: 177th overall, 1990; Washington Capitals
- Playing career: 1992–2009

Kenneth William Klee (born April 24, 1971) is an American ice hockey coach and former professional defenseman who played most notably with the Washington Capitals in the National Hockey League (NHL). He is currently the head coach of the Minnesota Frost of the Professional Women's Hockey League (PWHL).

== Early life ==
Klee was born in Indianapolis, Indiana. The son of a project engineer whose job required frequent moves, he spent portions of his childhood in Indianapolis, Denver, Colorado, and Kansas City, Missouri, before moving to Toronto and the St. Michael's Buzzers on a hockey scholarship as a 17-year-old.

== Playing career ==
Klee was drafted 177th overall by the Washington Capitals in the 1990 NHL entry draft. Klee would not play for the Capitals until the 1994–95 season, but it did not take him long to become a regular on the squad. Klee played with the Capitals until the end of the 2002–03 season. Klee had played in Washington for 9 seasons, and played in 604 games (regular season and playoffs) when he then became a free agent and signed with the Toronto Maple Leafs on September 27, 2003.

In Klee's first season in Toronto, he registered career highs in assists (25) and points (29) despite missing 16 games. On March 8, 2006, a day before the NHL's trading deadline, Klee was traded by the struggling Maple Leafs to the New Jersey Devils in exchange for winger Alexander Suglobov. On July 24, 2006, Klee signed a one-year contract with the Colorado Avalanche as a free agent for the 2006–07 season. Klee finished the season leading the Avalanche with a plus/minus of 18. On July 2, 2007, Klee signed a two-year contract with the Atlanta Thrashers.

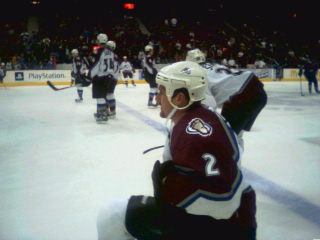
Klee with the Avalanche in 2006

On September 26, 2008, into the final year of his contract with the Thrashers, Klee was dealt along with Brad Larsen and Chad Painchaud to the Anaheim Ducks for defenseman Mathieu Schneider. After starting the 2008–09 season with the Ducks, Klee was claimed off re-entry waivers by the Phoenix Coyotes on October 28, 2008. After playing out the season with the Coyotes and becoming a free agent, Klee unofficially announced his retirement.

Though not known as a goal scorer, 13 of his 55 career goals were game-winning goals, the highest percentage in NHL history.

== International play ==
Klee represent United States at the 1991 World Junior Ice Hockey Championships and senior level at the 1992 Men's World Ice Hockey Championships, 1997 Men's World Ice Hockey Championships and also at the 2004 World Cup of Hockey.

== Coaching career ==
Klee was the head coach for the U.S. squad that finished second during his first Four Nations Cup in 2014 (2–0–1–1). That season, he also guided the U.S. Women's Under-22 Select Team to a first-place finish during his first campaign behind the bench for the U.S. in the 2014 Under-22 Series, defeating Canada in all three games. Klee led the U.S. Women's National Team to the gold medal at the 2015 IIHF Women's World Championship in Malmo, Sweden. He also guided the U.S. to a first-place finish at the 2015 Under-22 Series, defeating Canada two games to one.

Serving in the same capacity at the 2015 Four Nations Cup in Sundsvall, Sweden, Klee led the U.S. to an undefeated record (3–1–0–0) and first championship title since 2012. The tournament marks the seventh consecutive event that Klee has been at the helm of Team USA and the third time he has been behind the bench at the Four Nations Cup. He now owns an 18–3–1–2 record overall.

Klee was the head coach of the U.S. Women's National Team for the 2016 Four Nations Cup in Vierumaki, Finland from Oct 29 – Nov. 6. Klee then served as head coach of the U.S. Women's National Team at the 2016 International Ice Hockey Federation Women's World Championship in Kamloops, British Columbia. He led the U.S. to an undefeated record (4–1–0–0, W-OTW-OTL-L) and gold-medal.

Having left the women's national team, on July 18, 2017, Klee was hired as an assistant coach with the Syracuse Crunch of the American Hockey League.

On December 27, 2023, it was announced Klee would be replacing Charlie Burggraf as the head coach of PWHL Minnesota, after Burggraf stepped down from the position one week before the team's first game.

== Career statistics ==
=== Regular season and playoffs ===
			Regular season					Playoffs
Season	Team	League	GP	G	A	Pts	PIM	GP	G	A	Pts	PIM
1988–89	St. Michael's Buzzers	MetJHL	40	9	23	32	64	27	5	12	17	54
1989–90	Bowling Green Falcons	CCHA	39	0	5	5	52	—	—	—	—	—
1990–91	Bowling Green Falcons	CCHA	37	7	28	35	50	—	—	—	—	—
1991–92	Bowling Green Falcons	CCHA	10	0	1	1	14	—	—	—	—	—
1992–93	Baltimore Skipjacks	AHL	77	4	14	18	93	7	0	1	1	15
1993–94	Portland Pirates	AHL	65	2	9	11	87	17	1	2	3	14
1994–95	Portland Pirates	AHL	49	5	7	12	89	—	—	—	—	—
1994–95	Washington Capitals	NHL	23	3	1	4	41	7	0	0	0	4
1995–96	Washington Capitals	NHL	66	8	3	11	60	1	0	0	0	0
1996–97	Washington Capitals	NHL	80	3	8	11	115	—	—	—	—	—
1997–98	Washington Capitals	NHL	51	4	2	6	46	9	1	0	1	10
1998–99	Washington Capitals	NHL	78	7	13	20	80	—	—	—	—	—
1999–2000	Washington Capitals	NHL	80	7	13	20	79	5	0	1	1	10
2000–01	Washington Capitals	NHL	54	2	4	6	60	6	0	1	1	8
2001–02	Washington Capitals	NHL	68	8	8	16	38	—	—	—	—	—
2002–03	Washington Capitals	NHL	70	1	16	17	89	6	0	0	0	6
2003–04	Toronto Maple Leafs	NHL	66	4	25	29	36	11	0	0	0	6
2005–06	Toronto Maple Leafs	NHL	56	3	12	15	66	—	—	—	—	—
2005–06	New Jersey Devils	NHL	18	0	0	0	14	6	1	0	1	6
2006–07	Colorado Avalanche	NHL	81	3	16	19	68	—	—	—	—	—
2007–08	Atlanta Thrashers	NHL	72	1	9	10	60	—	—	—	—	—
2008–09	Anaheim Ducks	NHL	3	0	0	0	4	—	—	—	—	—
2008–09	Phoenix Coyotes	NHL	68	1	10	11	24	—	—	—	—	—
NHL totals			934	55	140	195	880	51	2	2	4	50

=== International ===
Year	Team	Event	Result	GP	G	A	Pts	PIM
1991	United States	WJC	4th	7	1	1	2	2
1992	United States	WC	7th	2	0	0	0	0
1997	United States	WC	6th	8	1	0	1	12
2004	United States	WCH	4th	4	0	0	0	0
Junior totals				7	1	1	2	2
Senior totals				14	1	0	1	12

== Transactions ==
- Selected by Washington Capitals in 1990 NHL Entry Draft. He was Washington's 9th round choice, 177th overall.
- Signed as a free agent by Toronto on September 27, 2003.
- Traded to New Jersey Devils by Toronto for Aleksander Suglobov on March 8, 2006.
- Signed as a free agent by Colorado Avalanche on July 24, 2006.
- Signed as a free agent by Atlanta Thrashers on July 2, 2007.
- Traded to Anaheim Ducks along with Brad Larsen and Chad Painchaud for Mathieu Schneider on September 26, 2008.
- Claimed off re-entry waivers by the Phoenix Coyotes on October 28, 2008.
