= Dmitri Ryabykin =

Russian ice hockey player

Dimitri Riabykin
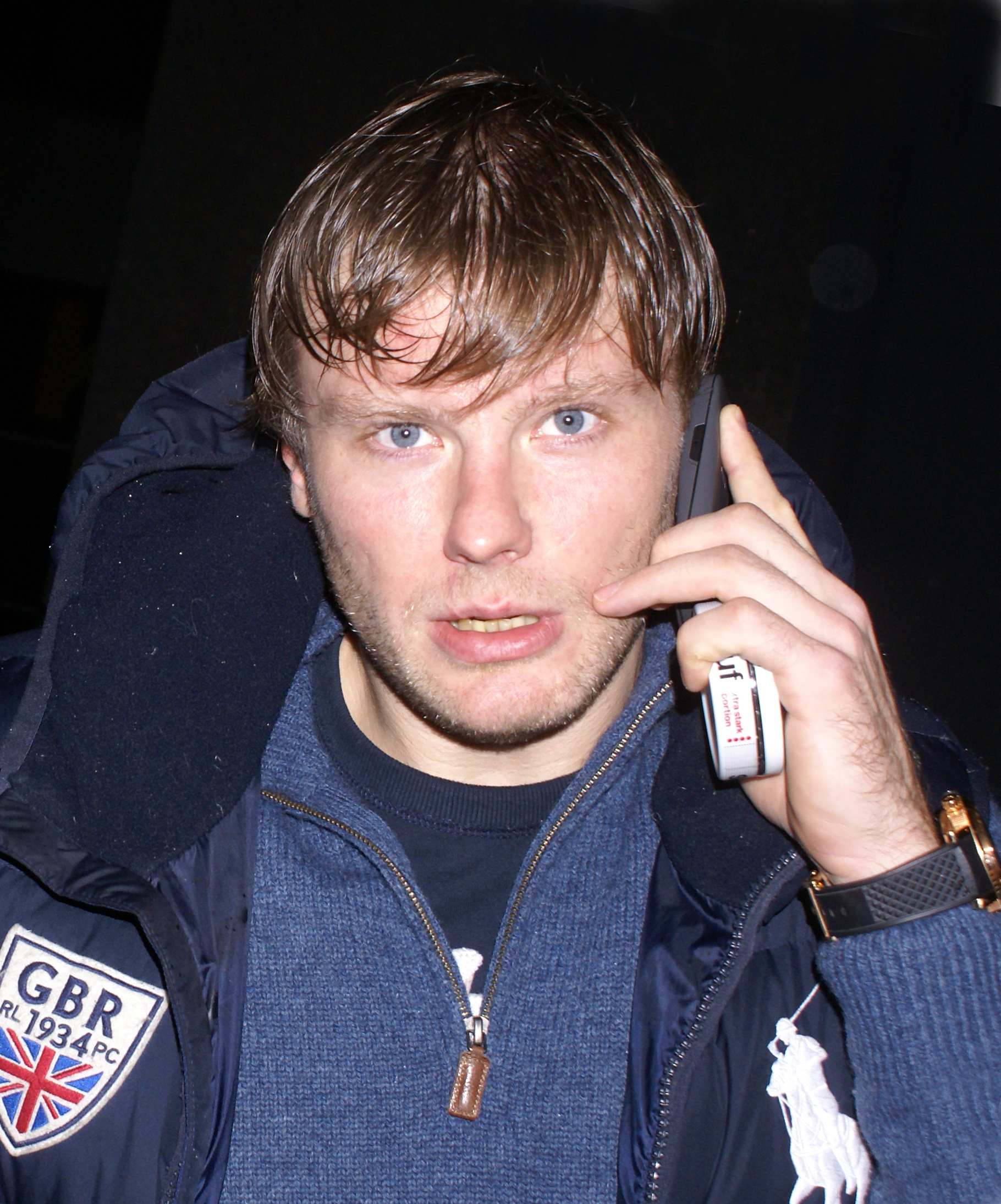
- Born: March 24, 1976 (age 50) Moscow, Russian SFSR
- Height: 6 ft 2 in (188 cm)
- Weight: 218 lb (99 kg; 15 st 8 lb)
- Position: Defence
- Shot: Right
- Played for: Dynamo Moscow; Avangard Omsk; SKA St. Petersburg; Traktor Chelyabinsk; HC Ugra
- National team: Russia
- NHL draft: 45th overall, 1994; Calgary Flames
- Playing career: 1994–2015

Dimitri Anatolyevich Riabykin is a Russian former professional ice hockey defenceman who played in the Kontinental Hockey League (KHL). He was selected by Calgary Flames in the second round (45th overall) of the 1994 NHL entry draft. He most formerly the head coach for HC Vityaz and Avangard Omsk in the Kontinental Hockey League (KHL).
