= Jan Hejda =

Czech ice hockey player (born 1978)

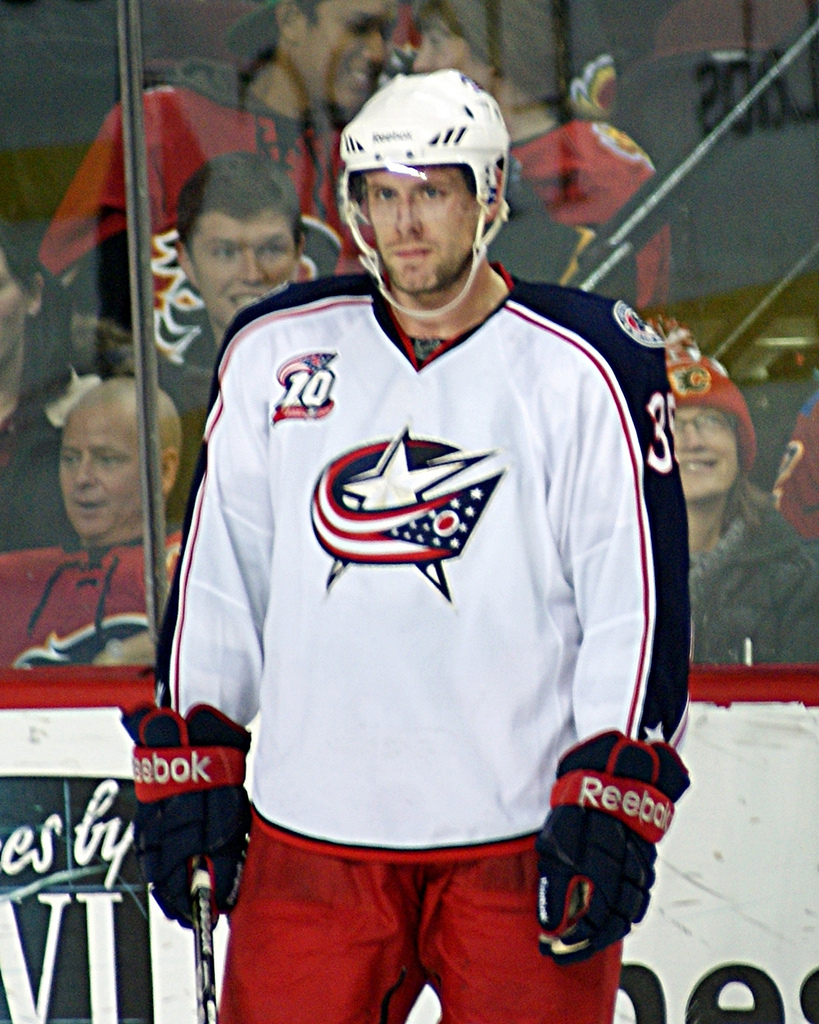
- Hejda with the Columbus Blue Jackets in December 2010
- Born: June 18, 1978 (age 48) Prague, Czechoslovakia
- Height: 6 ft 3 in (191 cm)
- Weight: 209 lb (95 kg; 14 st 13 lb)
- Position: Defence
- Shot: Left
- Played for: Slavia Praha; CSKA Moscow; Khimik Moscow Oblast; Edmonton Oilers; Columbus Blue Jackets; Colorado Avalanche
- National team: Czech Republic
- NHL draft: 106th overall, 2003; Buffalo Sabres
- Playing career: 1997–2016

Jan Hejda (born June 18, 1978) is a Czech former professional ice hockey defenceman who played with the Edmonton Oilers, the Columbus Blue Jackets and the Colorado Avalanche in the National Hockey League (NHL).

== Playing career ==
Hejda was originally selected in the fourth round, 106th overall in the 2003 NHL entry draft by the Buffalo Sabres. He played six seasons with Slavia Praha of the Czech Extraliga, two seasons with CSKA Moscow of the Russian Superleague (RSL), and one season with Khimik Moscow Oblast, also of the RSL.

In July 2006, Hejda was traded to the Edmonton Oilers by the Sabres in exchange for a seventh-round draft pick. He was then signed to his first NHL contract by the Oilers, to a one-year deal the same week.

Hejda scored his first NHL goal on January 8, 2007, against the Los Angeles Kings netminder Mathieu Garon. The Kings' Konstantin Pushkarev had scored his first NHL goal in the game's third period to send the game into overtime; Hejda's goal in overtime gave the Oilers their 2–1 win.

In July 2007, Hejda signed a 1-year, $1 million deal with the Columbus Blue Jackets. He turned out to be one of the club's best defensemen the following season, ending with a team-record +20 plus-minus on a team that had never had anyone finish higher than +13 before.

He subsequently signed a 3-year deal worth $6 million on April 29, 2008. After not scoring the previous season, Hejda scored three goals in addition to 18 assists during the 2008–09 season. He also played in three of the Blue Jackets' four playoff games in their opening-round series against the defending Stanley Cup champion and second-seeded Detroit Red Wings, Columbus' first-ever playoff appearance.

On April 1, 2011, in a 4–3 shootout loss to the Chicago Blackhawks, Hejda delivered an elbow to the head of Blackhawks’ forward Marcus Krüger. Although Krüger was not injured, the NHL gave Hejda a two-game suspension. He ended the 2010–11 season with five goals and 15 assists for 20 points in 77 contests played.

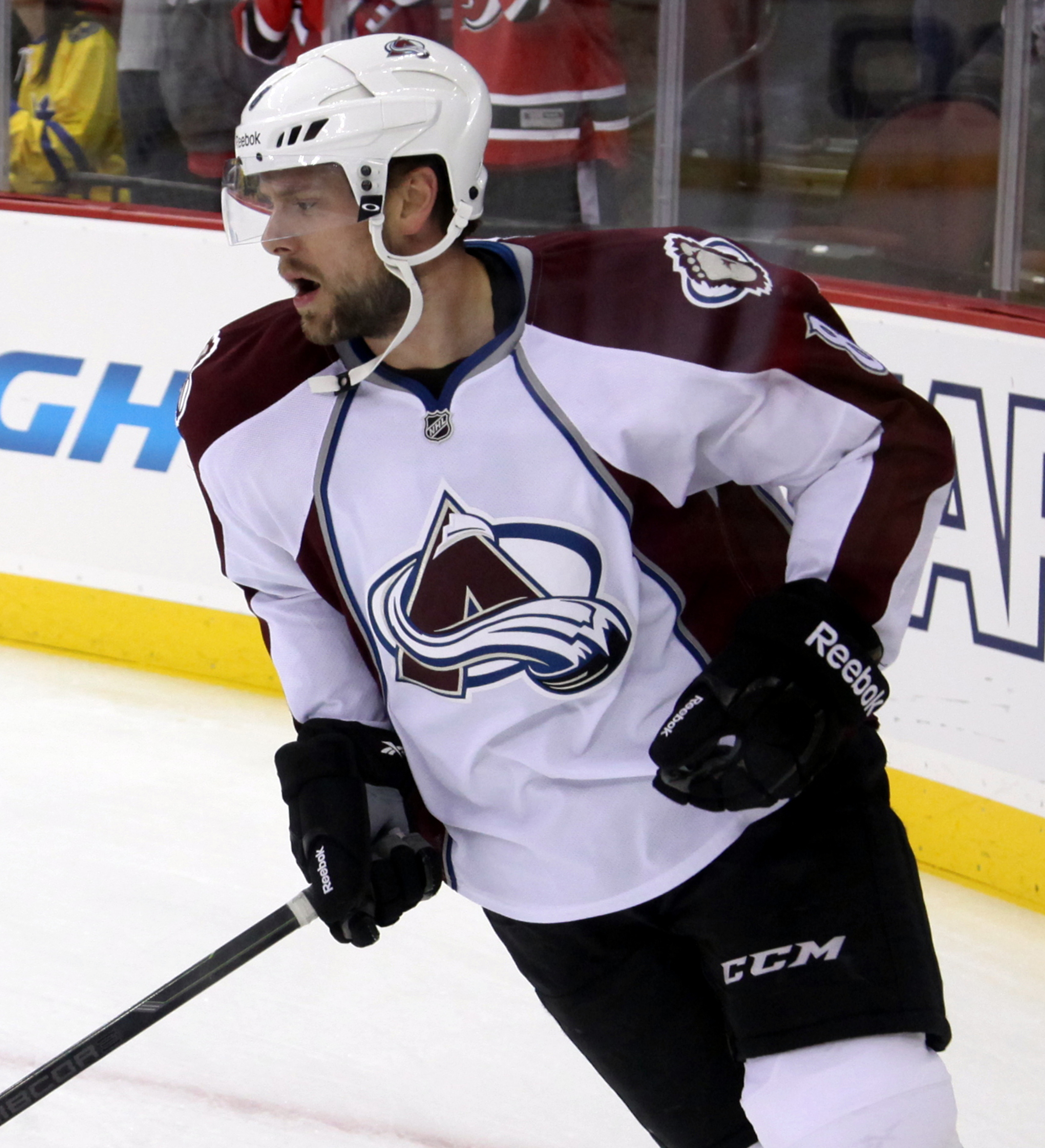
Hejda during his tenure with the Avalanche in November 2014.

On the first day of free agency prior to the 2011–12 season, Hejda's emergence as a stay-at-home defenseman was rewarded when he was promptly signed to a four-year, $15 million contract with the Colorado Avalanche on July 1, 2011. Hejda made his Avalanche debut on opening night in a 3–0 defeat to the Detroit Red Wings on October 8, 2011. He instantly established himself within the Avalanche blueline, playing in 81 games and leading all Avalanche players in ice time throughout the season. He tied first amongst the defenseman with 5 goals and featured in his 400th career NHL game against the Winnipeg Jets on February 19, 2012.

In the lockout-shortened 2012–13 season, Hejda appeared in 46 games and finished second on the blueline in scoring with only 10 points. On February 26, 2013, Hejda matched a career high in posting 2 assists in a shootout defeat to the San Jose Sharks to reach the 100-career point mark in the NHL.

In the 2013–14 season, Hejda helped the Avalanche rebound to reach the post-season, playing alongside defensive partner Erik Johnson, to form the team's top defensive pairing. He scored a career high 6 goals in 78 games and made his 500th regular season appearance against the San Jose Sharks on December 23, 2013. In the last regular season game, Hejda suffered two broken fingers against the Anaheim Ducks on April 13, 2014. Although visibly impeding his game, Hejda appeared in all 7 post-season contests, leading the club with 18 blocked shots, against the Minnesota Wild.

At the completion of his four-year contract with the Avalanche following the 2014–15 season, Hejda became a free agent over the summer. Unable to earn a contract offer from an NHL team, Hejda accepted a try-out invitation to attend the Chicago Blackhawks training camp on September 12, 2015. Despite a solid camp with the Blackhawks, Hejda was not tendered a contract due to a crowded blueline and was released on September 27, 2015. Two months into the 2015–16 season, looking for an opportunity to play, Hejda returned to the Columbus Blue Jackets fold in signing a professional try-out contract with AHL affiliate, the Lake Erie Monsters on December 7, 2015. Hejda played in the American league for the first time since 2006, appearing in 11 scoreless games with the Monsters before he was released from his try-out on January 8, 2016.

== Personal life ==
Hejda resides in Denver, Colorado and is married to his wife Tereza with whom he has two children, a daughter, Natalia, and son, Matheas. He coached his son's youth team at the 9280 Pond Hockey Tournament in Keystone. He has the role of Director of Player Development of Europe/Western U.S. for Edge Sports Management. Hejda has volunteered time and donated money to those affiliated with DAWG Nation Hockey Foundation, a nonprofit benefitting individuals and families within the ice hockey community encountering hardship. At one time, he was a member of the nonprofit's board of directors.

== Career statistics ==
=== Regular season and playoffs ===
			Regular season					Playoffs
Season	Team	League	GP	G	A	Pts	PIM	GP	G	A	Pts	PIM
1997–98	Slavia Praha	ELH	44	2	5	7	51	5	0	0	0	6
1998–99	Slavia Praha	ELH	34	1	2	3	38	—	—	—	—	—
1999–2000	Slavia Praha	ELH	26	1	2	3	14	—	—	—	—	—
1999–2000	Femax Havířov	ELH	7	0	2	2	6	—	—	—	—	—
1999–2000	Liberec	CZE.2	1	0	0	0	4	—	—	—	—	—
2000–01	Slavia Praha	ELH	38	2	6	8	70	11	3	0	3	12
2000–01	Kadaň	CZE.2	8	1	0	1	6	—	—	—	—	—
2001–02	Slavia Praha	ELH	42	9	8	17	52	9	1	1	2	14
2002–03	Slavia Praha	ELH	52	6	11	17	44	17	5	8	13	12
2003–04	CSKA Moscow	RSL	60	1	6	7	26	—	—	—	—	—
2004–05	CSKA Moscow	RSL	60	2	11	13	59	—	—	—	—	—
2005–06	Khimik Moscow Oblast	RSL	50	3	13	16	58	9	2	3	5	24
2006–07	Edmonton Oilers	NHL	39	1	8	9	20	—	—	—	—	—
2006–07	Hamilton Bulldogs	AHL	5	0	3	3	21	—	—	—	—	—
2007–08	Columbus Blue Jackets	NHL	81	0	13	13	61	—	—	—	—	—
2008–09	Columbus Blue Jackets	NHL	82	3	18	21	38	3	0	0	0	2
2009–10	Columbus Blue Jackets	NHL	62	3	10	13	36	—	—	—	—	—
2010–11	Columbus Blue Jackets	NHL	77	5	15	20	28	—	—	—	—	—
2011–12	Colorado Avalanche	NHL	81	5	14	19	24	—	—	—	—	—
2012–13	Colorado Avalanche	NHL	46	1	9	10	28	—	—	—	—	—
2013–14	Colorado Avalanche	NHL	78	6	11	17	40	7	0	0	0	6
2014–15	Colorado Avalanche	NHL	81	1	12	13	42	—	—	—	—	—
2015–16	Lake Erie Monsters	AHL	11	0	0	0	0	—	—	—	—	—
ELH totals			243	21	36	57	275	42	9	9	18	44
RSL totals			170	6	28	34	141	9	2	3	5	24
NHL totals			627	25	110	135	317	10	0	0	0	8

=== International ===
Medal record

Representing Czech Republic

World Championships
Gold medal – first place	2005 Vienna	
Silver medal – second place	2006 Riga	

Year	Team	Event	Result	GP	G	A	Pts	PIM
1998	Czech Republic	WJC	4th	7	0	1	1	2
2003	Czech Republic	WC	4th	9	0	0	0	4
2004	Czech Republic	WC	5th	7	1	1	2	8
2005	Czech Republic	WC	1st place, gold medalist(s)	9	0	0	0	2
2006	Czech Republic	WC	2nd place, silver medalist(s)	9	0	0	0	4
2008	Czech Republic	WC	5th	7	1	0	1	0
2010	Czech Republic	OG	7th	5	0	0	0	4
2013	Czech Republic	WC	7th	8	0	1	1	0
2015	Czech Republic	WC	4th	10	0	2	2	2
Senior totals				64	2	4	6	24
