= Sergei Vyshedkevich =

Russian ice hockey player

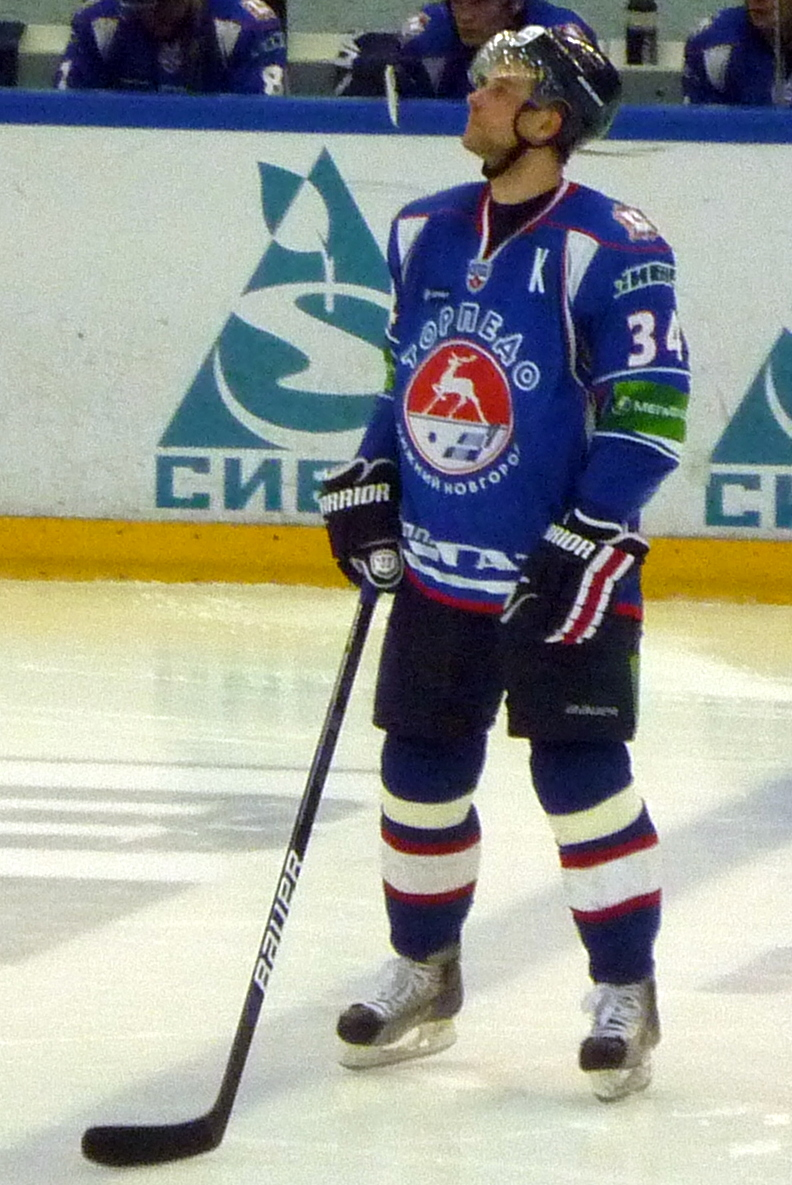
- Born: January 3, 1975 (age 51) Dedovsk, Russian SFSR, Soviet Union
- Height: 6 ft 0 in (183 cm)
- Weight: 176 lb (80 kg; 12 st 8 lb)
- Position: Defence
- Shot: Left
- Played for: Atlanta Thrashers; HC Dynamo Moscow; Torpedo Nizhny Novgorod
- National team: Russia
- NHL draft: 70th overall, 1995; New Jersey Devils
- Playing career: 1994–2011

Sergei Iosifovich Vyshedkevich (born January 3, 1975) is a Russian former professional ice hockey defenseman who last played for Torpedo Nizhny Novgorod of the Kontinental Hockey League. He was drafted by the New Jersey Devils in the third round, 70th overall, of the 1995 NHL entry draft.

== Career ==
After playing two seasons with Dynamo Moscow, Vyshedkevich came to North America to play with the Devils' AHL affiliate, the Albany River Rats, in the 1996–97 season. Vyshedkevich played three full seasons with the River Rats before the Devils traded him to the expansion Atlanta Thrashers as part of a deal during the 1999 NHL Expansion Draft.

While with the Thrashers, Vyshedkevich appeared in 30 NHL games across two seasons, scoring two goals and adding five assists. During the 2001–02 season, the Thrashers traded him to the Mighty Ducks of Anaheim along with Scott Langkow in exchange for Ladislav Kohn. He finished the season with Anaheim's AHL affiliate, the Cincinnati Mighty Ducks. He returned to Russia to play for Dynamo Moscow of the Russian Super League the following season.

He spent his final professional season with Torpedo Nizhny Novgorod of the Kontinental Hockey League, successor to the RSL.

== Honours ==
- International Hockey League: 1995 (with Dynamo)
- Russian Championship: 2005
- European Champions cup: 2006

== Career statistics ==
			Regular season					Playoffs
Season	Team	League	GP	G	A	Pts	PIM	GP	G	A	Pts	PIM
1993–94	Dynamo Moskva	IHL	—	—	—	—	—	4	0	2	2	2
1994–95	Dynamo Moskva	IHL	49	6	7	13	67	14	2	0	2	12
1995–96	Dynamo Moskva	IHL	49	5	4	9	12	13	1	1	2	6
1996–97	Albany River Rats	AHL	65	8	27	35	16	12	0	6	6	0
1997–98	Albany River Rats	AHL	54	12	16	28	12	13	0	10	10	4
1998–99	Albany River Rats	AHL	79	11	38	49	28	5	0	3	3	0
1999–00	Atlanta Thrashers	NHL	7	1	3	4	2	—	—	—	—	—
1999–00	Orlando Solar Bears	IHL	69	11	23	34	32	6	3	3	6	8
2000–01	Atlanta Thrashers	NHL	23	1	2	3	14	—	—	—	—	—
2000–01	Orlando Solar Bears	IHL	10	2	3	5	2	—	—	—	—	—
2000–01	Cincinnati Mighty Ducks	AHL	17	3	2	5	2	—	—	—	—	—
2001–02	Dynamo Moskva	Russia	51	5	7	12	56	3	0	0	0	0
2002–03	Dynamo Moskva	Russia	50	4	8	12	58	5	0	2	2	36
2003–04	Dynamo Moskva	Russia	58	3	6	9	73	3	0	0	0	2
2004–05	Dynamo Moskva	Russia	58	5	8	13	34	10	0	1	1	8
2005–06	Dynamo Moskva	Russia	51	2	4	6	42	4	0	0	0	16
2006–07	Dynamo Moskva	Russia	54	3	15	18	109	3	1	2	3	4
2007–08	Dynamo Moskva	Russia	57	3	13	16	80	9	2	1	3	6
2008–09	Dynamo Moskva	KHL	51	3	12	15	64	12	0	0	0	10
2009–10	Dynamo Moskva	KHL	47	2	7	9	48	4	0	0	0	0
2010–11	Torpedo Nizhny Novgorod	KHL	54	1	14	15	30	—	—	—	—	—
NHL totals			30	2	5	7	16	—	—	—	—	—
AHL totals			215	34	83	117	58	30	0	19	19	4
Russia totals			477	36	72	108	531	68	6	9	15	92

== International statistics ==
Year	Team	Event	Place	GP	G	A	Pts	PIM
1995	Russia	WJC	2nd place, silver medalist(s)	7	1	6	7	4
2002	Russia	WC	2nd place, silver medalist(s)	9	0	0	0	8
2003	Russia	WC	5th	7	0	0	0	2
2005	Russia	WC	3rd place, bronze medalist(s)	9	1	1	2	6
Senior int'l totals				25	1	1	2	16
