= Andrei Subbotin =

Russian ice hockey player

- Born: February 1, 1973 (age 53) Tomsk, Soviet Union
- Height: 5 ft 11 in (180 cm)
- Weight: 174 lb (79 kg; 12 st 6 lb)
- Position: Forward
- Shot: Left
- Played for: Avtomobilist Sverdlovsk; HC CSKA Moscow; Metallurg Serov; Avtomobilist Yekaterinburg; Avangard Omsk; HC Sibir Novosibirsk; Lokomotiv Yaroslavl; HC Neftekhimik Nizhnekamsk; HC Kuban
- NHL draft: Undrafted
- Playing career: 1991–2014

Andrei Subbotin (born February 1, 1973) is a Russian professional ice hockey defenceman who currently plays for Avtomobilist Yekaterinburg of the Kontinental Hockey League (KHL).

== Career statistics ==
			Regular season					Playoffs
Season	Team	League	GP	G	A	Pts	PIM	GP	G	A	Pts	PIM
1989–90	Avtomobilist Sverdlovsk	Soviet	—	—	—	—	—	—	—	—	—	—
1990–91	Avtomobilist Sverdlovsk	Soviet	18	2	1	3	4	—	—	—	—	—
1991–92	HC CSKA Moscow	Soviet	2	0	0	0	0	—	—	—	—	—
1991–92	HC CSKA Moscow-2	Soviet3	6	2	2	4	0	—	—	—	—	—
1991–92	Avtomobilist Sverdlovsk	Soviet	9	0	0	0	2	—	—	—	—	—
1991–92	Metallurg Serov	Soviet3	11	2	5	7	0	—	—	—	—	—
1992–93	Avtomobilist Yekaterinburg	Russia	40	7	4	11	12	3	1	0	1	0
1992–93	Metallurg Serov	Russia2	6	1	1	2	4	—	—	—	—	—
1993–94	Avtomobilist Yekaterinburg	Russia	41	7	3	10	18	—	—	—	—	—
1993–94	Avtomobilist Yekaterinburg-2	Russia3	2	0	0	0	0	—	—	—	—	—
1994–95	Avtomobilist Yekaterinburg	Russia	49	9	9	18	34	2	1	0	1	0
1995–96	Avangard Omsk	Russia	43	8	4	12	2	3	0	0	0	2
1996–97	Avangard Omsk	Russia	39	7	9	16	18	—	—	—	—	—
1996–97	Avangard Omsk-2	Russia3	1	0	1	1	0	—	—	—	—	—
1997–98	Avangard Omsk	Russia	41	12	15	27	26	5	1	2	3	12
1998–99	Avangard Omsk	Russia	39	8	5	13	20	5	1	1	2	2
1999–00	Avangard Omsk	Russia	28	10	7	17	12	8	1	2	3	6
1999–00	Avangard-VDV Omsk	Russia3	3	1	4	5	0	—	—	—	—	—
2000–01	Avangard Omsk	Russia	42	11	10	21	38	16	3	4	7	47
2001–02	Avangard Omsk	Russia	50	11	11	22	22	11	1	1	2	6
2002–03	Avangard Omsk	Russia	48	10	10	20	40	12	1	1	2	0
2003–04	HC Sibir Novosibirsk	Russia	60	15	10	25	50	—	—	—	—	—
2004–05	Avangard Omsk	Russia	8	0	1	1	2	—	—	—	—	—
2004–05	Omskie Yastreby	Russia3	1	2	1	3	0	—	—	—	—	—
2004–05	HC Sibir Novosibirsk	Russia	34	5	10	15	28	—	—	—	—	—
2005–06	HC Sibir Novosibirsk	Russia	50	6	8	14	22	4	2	2	4	2
2006–07	HC Sibir Novosibirsk	Russia	49	21	21	42	44	7	1	1	2	6
2007–08	HC Sibir Novosibirsk	Russia	53	5	21	26	34	—	—	—	—	—
2008–09	Avtomobilist Yekaterinburg	Russia2	54	19	31	50	34	7	2	2	4	10
2009–10	Avtomobilist Yekaterinburg	KHL	55	12	15	27	18	4	1	0	1	4
2010–11	Avtomobilist Yekaterinburg	KHL	48	15	23	38	26	—	—	—	—	—
2010–11	Lokomotiv Yaroslavl	KHL	6	3	3	6	0	11	2	2	4	6
2011–12	Avtomobilist Yekaterinburg	KHL	53	6	26	32	34	—	—	—	—	—
2012–13	HC Neftekhimik Nizhnekamsk	KHL	39	7	9	16	14	3	0	0	0	2
2013–14	HC Kuban	VHL	10	2	1	3	6	10	2	5	7	2
KHL totals			201	43	73	116	82	18	3	2	5	12
Russia totals			714	152	158	310	422	76	13	14	27	85
