= Richard Pavlikovský =

Slovak ice hockey player

Richard Pavlikovsky
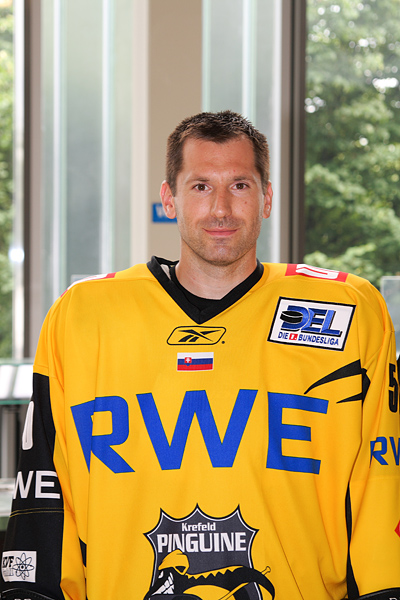
- Born: March 3, 1975 (age 50); Ilava, Czechoslovakia
- Height: 5 ft 11 in (180 cm)
- Weight: 194 lb (88 kg; 13 st 12 lb)
- Position: Defence
- Shoots: Right
- EBEL team Former teams: Orli Znojmo; HK Dukla Trenčín; HC Havířov; HV71; Leksands IF; Grizzly Adams Wolfsburg; Krefeld Pinguine
- National team: Slovakia
- NHL draft: Undrafted
- Playing career: 1993–present

Richard Pavlikovský (born March 3, 1975, in Ilava, Czechoslovakia) is a Slovak professional ice hockey defenceman. From 2005 through 2013, he played for Krefeld Pinguine in the Deutsche Eishockey Liga (DEL).

In the 2013–2014 season, he began playing for the Orli Znojmo (Eagles), based in Czech city of Znojmo. The team is part of the Austrian Hockey League, also known as the Erste Bank Eishockey Liga (EBEL) or Erste Bank Hockey League, in English, for its major sponsor. He also competed in the men's tournament at the 2002 Winter Olympics.

His younger brother Rastislav is also a hockey international for Slovakia.

== Ball Hockey ==
Pavlikovský also represented Slovakia at the 1999 Ball Hockey World Championships and won gold medal.
