= David Nemirovsky =

Canadian ice hockey player

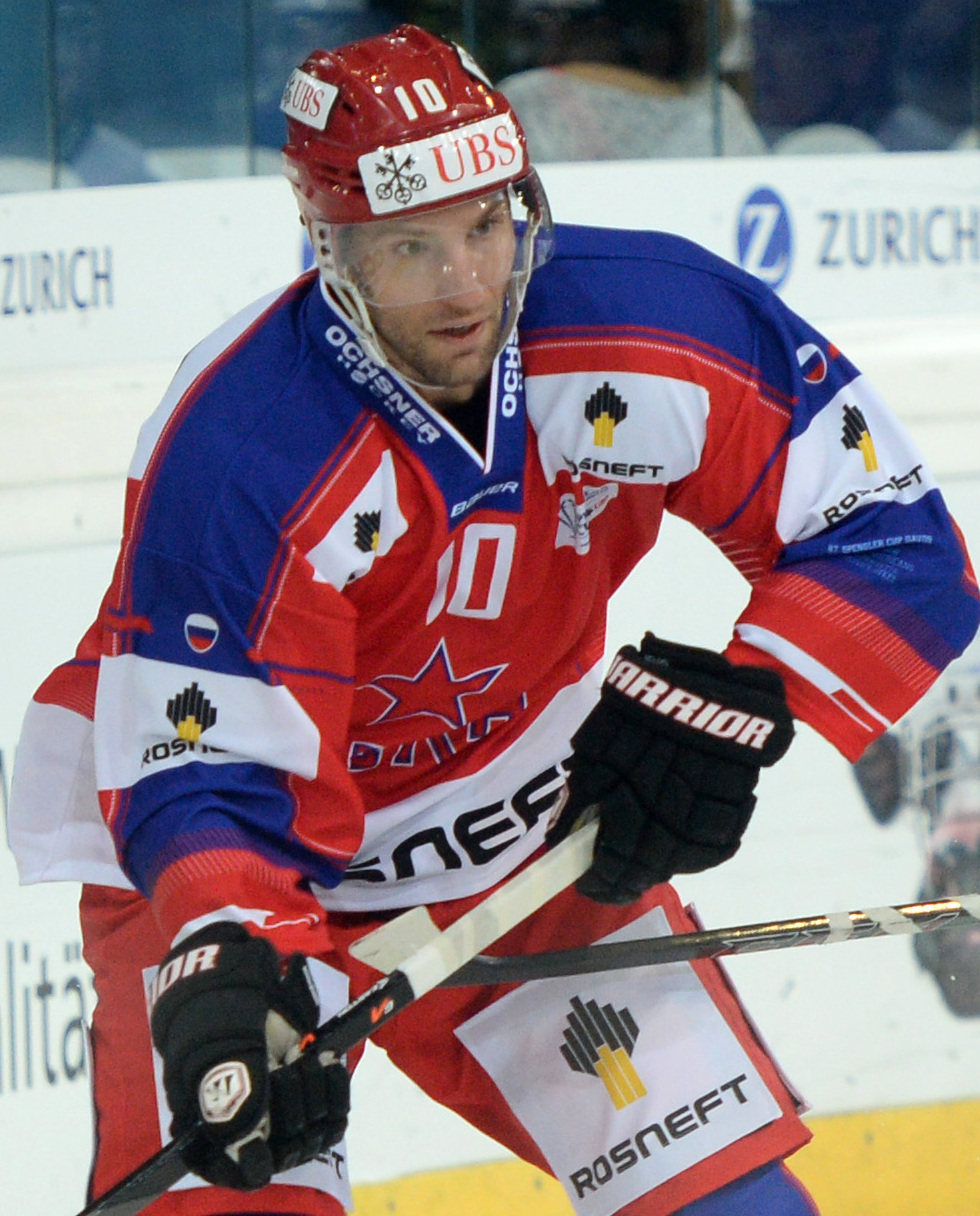
- Nemirovsky with CSKA Moscow in 2013
- Born: August 1, 1976 (age 50) Toronto, Ontario, Canada
- Height: 6 ft 2 in (188 cm)
- Weight: 205 lb (93 kg; 14 st 9 lb)
- Position: Right wing
- Shot: Right
- Played for: Florida Panthers; HV71; Lokomotiv Yaroslavl; Ilves; Jokerit; Khimik Voskresensk; AK Bars Kazan; SKA St. Petersburg; Barys Astana; HC Dinamo Minsk; CSKA Moscow
- NHL draft: 84th overall, 1994; Florida Panthers
- Playing career: 1996–2011; 2013–2014
Medal record
Ice hockey
Representing Canada
Maccabiah Games
Gold medal – first place	1997 Israel	Ice hockey

David Semenovich Nemirovsky (Russian: Дэвид Немировски; born August 1, 1976) is a Canadian former professional ice hockey forward.

== Playing career ==
Nemirovsky was born in Toronto, Canada, and is of Russian descent. As a youth, he played in the 1990 Quebec International Pee-Wee Hockey Tournament with a minor ice hockey team from Wexford, Toronto.

Nemirovsky was drafted 84th overall by the National Hockey League's Florida Panthers in the 1994 NHL entry draft. Picked from the Ottawa 67's of the Ontario Hockey League, he went on to play parts of four seasons with Florida, playing 91 games for the Panthers and scoring 16 goals and 22 assists for 38 points, he also picked up 42 penalty minutes.

He played for Team Canada in the 1997 Maccabiah Games in Israel, winning a gold medal.

Nemirovsky then spent three seasons with the St. John's Maple Leafs in the American Hockey League before moving to Europe. After short spells in Sweden and Russia, he spent two seasons in Finland before returning to Russia in 2003. In 2010, he played with CSKA Moscow. Nemirovsky came out of retirement and signed with CSKA Moscow of the KHL in 2013.

== Executive and coaching career ==
Following his retirement from an 18-year playing career, Nemirovsky remained in Russia and moved into hockey management in accepting the role of Sports Director at the age of 38 for Admiral Vladivostok of the KHL from 2015 to 2018.

On May 7, 2018, Nemirovsky was announced as head coach for Torpedo Nizhny Novgorod of the KHL beginning from the 2018–19 season.

== Career statistics ==
			Regular season					Playoffs
Season	Team	League	GP	G	A	Pts	PIM	GP	G	A	Pts	PIM
1991–92	Western Dukes	MetJHL	23	6	13	19	2	—	—	—	—	—
1991–92	Pickering Panthers	MetJHL	14	3	10	13	5	—	—	—	—	—
1992–93	North York Rangers	MetJHL	40	19	23	42	27	—	—	—	—	—
1993–94	Ottawa 67's	OHL	64	21	31	52	18	17	10	10	20	2
1994–95	Ottawa 67's	OHL	59	27	29	56	25	—	—	—	—	—
1995–96	Sarnia Sting	OHL	28	18	27	45	14	10	8	8	16	6
1995–96	Carolina Monarchs	AHL	5	1	2	3	0	—	—	—	—	—
1995–96	Florida Panthers	NHL	9	0	2	2	2	—	—	—	—	—
1996–97	Florida Panthers	NHL	39	7	7	14	32	3	1	0	1	0
1996–97	Carolina Monarchs	AHL	34	21	21	42	18	—	—	—	—	—
1997–98	Florida Panthers	NHL	41	9	12	21	8	—	—	—	—	—
1997–98	New Haven Beast	AHL	29	10	15	25	10	1	1	0	1	0
1998–99	Fort Wayne Komets	IHL	44	22	13	35	24	—	—	—	—	—
1998–99	Florida Panthers	NHL	2	0	1	1	0	—	—	—	—	—
1998–99	St. John's Maple Leafs	AHL	22	3	9	12	18	5	4	1	5	0
1999–00	St. John's Maple Leafs	AHL	57	18	25	43	69	—	—	—	—	—
2000–01	St. John's Maple Leafs	AHL	9	1	2	3	10	—	—	—	—	—
2000–01	HV71	SEL	26	7	11	18	45	—	—	—	—	—
2001–02	Lokomotiv Yaroslavl	RSL	10	2	2	4	4	—	—	—	—	—
2001–02	Ilves	SM-l	20	12	18	30	34	3	1	0	1	8
2002–03	Ilves	SM-l	20	9	8	17	24	—	—	—	—	—
2002–03	Jokerit	SM-l	36	9	15	24	14	9	1	2	3	6
2003–04	Khimik Voskresensk	RSL	16	3	3	6	2	—	—	—	—	—
2003–04	Ak Bars Kazan	RSL	38	12	6	18	12	8	1	1	2	2
2004–05	Ak Bars Kazan	RSL	8	0	0	0	2	—	—	—	—	—
2004–05	SKA Saint Petersburg	RSL	32	6	4	10	6	—	—	—	—	—
2005–06	CSKA Moscow	RSL	45	9	9	18	42	7	3	1	4	8
2006–07	CSKA Moscow	RSL	47	14	14	28	32	12	2	1	3	6
2007–08	SKA Saint Petersburg	RSL	53	15	13	28	40	9	2	1	3	36
2008–09	SKA Saint Petersburg	KHL	43	13	14	27	30	3	1	0	1	4
2009–10	Barys Astana	KHL	47	15	14	29	28	3	1	0	1	0
2010–11	HC Dinamo Minsk	KHL	16	2	6	8	2	—	—	—	—	—
2010–11	CSKA Moscow	KHL	2	0	0	0	0	—	—	—	—	—
2010–11	Mighty Dogs Schweinfurt	Ger.4	2	4	2	6	0	3	4	5	9	18
2013–14	CSKA Moscow	KHL	16	0	0	0	6	—	—	—	—	—
NHL totals			91	16	22	38	42	3	1	0	1	0
RSL totals			249	61	51	112	140	36	8	4	12	52
KHL totals			124	30	34	64	66	6	2	0	2	4

== See also ==
- List of select Jewish ice hockey players
