= Radim Kucharczyk =

Czech ice hockey player

- Born: October 25, 1979 (age 46)
- Height: 5 ft 11 in (180 cm)
- Weight: 191 lb (87 kg; 13 st 9 lb)
- Position: Forward
- Shoots: Left
- Czech Extraliga team: HC Olomouc
- NHL draft: Undrafted
- Playing career: 1999–present

Radim Kucharczyk (born October 24, 1979) is a Czech professional ice hockey player who played with HC Olomouc in the Czech Extraliga.

He previously played for HC Vsetín, HC Šumperk, Ilves Tampere, HC Oceláři Třinec, HC Karlovy Vary, HC Kladno, HC Znojmo, HC Slovan Bratislava and HC Kometa Brno.
