= Robert Kántor =

Czech ice hockey player

- Born: February 25, 1977 (age 48); Brno, CS
- Height: 6 ft 0 in (183 cm)
- Weight: 209 lb (95 kg; 14 st 13 lb)
- Position: Defence
- Shot: Left
- Czech Extraliga team: HC Kometa Brno
- Playing career: 1994–2012

Robert Kántor (born February 25, 1977) is a former professional ice hockey defenceman. He last played in Austria with the Graz 99ers during the 2011–12 season.

== Career statistics ==
			Regular season					Playoffs
Season	Team	League	GP	G	A	Pts	PIM	GP	G	A	Pts	PIM
1994–95	HC Kometa Brno	CZE-2	34	4	4	8	..	--	--	--	--	--
1995–96	HC Kometa Brno	CZE	14	0	0	0	10	--	--	--	--	--
1996–97	HC Kometa Brno	CZE-2	43	5	9	14	..	--	--	--	--	--
1997–98	HC Železárny Třinec	CZE	37	2	9	11	28	12	0	0	0	20
1998–99	HC Kometa Brno	CZE-2	2	0	0	0	2	--	--	--	--	--
1998–99	HC Oceláři Třinec	CZE	31	2	1	3	59	3	0	0	0	0
1999–00	HC Oceláři Třinec	CZE	4	0	0	0	0	-	-	-	-	-
1999–00	HC Femax Havířov	CZE	14	2	1	3	26	-	-	-	-	-
1999–00	HC IPB Poj.Pardubice	CZE	24	4	7	11	24	3	0	0	0	2
2000–01	Becherovka Karlovy Vary	CZE	28	2	5	7	48	-	-	-	-	-
2001–02	HIFK	FIN	55	8	7	15	155	-	-	-	-	-
2002–03	HIFK	FIN	55	8	11	19	70	4	1	0	1	14
2003–04	Dynamo Moskva	RUS	15	1	1	2	20	-	-	-	-	-
2003–04	Ak Bars Kazan	RUS	14	2	1	3	20	7	0	0	0	6
2004–05	Tappara Tampere	FIN	52	9	9	18	62	3	1	0	1	4
2005–06	HC Moeller Pardubice	CZE	49	7	9	16	60	-	-	-	-	-
2006–07	HC Vítkovice Steel	CZE	5	0	0	0	4	-	-	-	-	-
2006–07	Färjestads BK	SWE	38	8	9	17	48	9	1	0	1	16
2007–08	DEG Metro Stars	GER	20	2	3	5	59	-	-	-	-	-
2007–08	Jokerit Helsinki	FIN	30	0	6	6	41	13	0	1	1	8
2008–09	HC Kometa Brno	CZE-2	34	10	13	23	79	16	5	1	6	76
CZE totals			206	19	32	51	257	18	0	0	0	22
FIN totals			192	25	33	58	328	20	2	1	3	26
SWE totals			38	8	9	17	48	9	1	0	1	16
RUS totals			29	3	2	5	40	7	0	0	0	6
GER totals			20	2	3	5	59	-	-	-	-	-
