= Jindřich Kotrla =

Czech ice hockey player

- Born: March 7, 1975 (age 51) Most, Czechoslovakia
- Height: 6 ft 0 in (183 cm)
- Weight: 203 lb (92 kg; 14 st 7 lb)
- Position: Forward
- Shoots: Left
- Czech Extraliga team: HC Kladno
- National team: Czech Republic
- Playing career: 1994–present

Jindřich Kotrla (born March 7, 1975) is a Czech professional ice hockey player. He played with HC Kladno in the Czech Extraliga during the 2010–11 Czech Extraliga season.
