= Andrei Tsaryov (1975) =

Russian ice hockey player

- Born: August 30, 1975 (age 49); Gorky, Russian SFSR, Soviet Union
- Height: 6 ft 2 in (188 cm)
- Weight: 207 lb (94 kg; 14 st 11 lb)
- Position: Goaltender
- Shot: Left
- Played for: HC CSKA Moscow; Ak Bars Kazan; HC Neftekhimik Nizhnekamsk; Torpedo Nizhny Novgorod; MHC Dmitrov; Keramin Minsk; HC Neman Grodno
- Playing career: 1992–2010

Andrei Tsaryov (born August 30, 1975) is a Russian former professional ice hockey goaltender who played for Russia in the 1999 and 2003 IIHF World Championships. After completing his career as a player, he became a coach.

== Awards and honors ==
Award	Year
RSL
Silver (Ak Bars Kazan)	2000
Silver (Ak Bars Kazan)	2002
