= Jari Kauppila =

Finnish ice hockey player

- Born: February 23, 1974 (age 51); Lammi, Finland
- Height: 5 ft 10 in (178 cm)
- Weight: 185 lb (84 kg; 13 st 3 lb)
- Position: Centre
- Shot: Right
- SM-liiga team: Lahti Pelicans
- National team: Finland
- NHL draft: Undrafted
- Playing career: 1991–2014

Jari Kauppila (born February 23, 1974) is a Finnish ice hockey centre playing with Lahti Pelicans in the Finnish SM-liiga.

Kauppila made his SM-liiga debut with Hockey-Reipas during the 1991–92 SM-liiga season.

== Career statistics ==
			Regular season					Playoffs
Season	Team	League	GP	G	A	Pts	PIM	GP	G	A	Pts	PIM
1990–91	Reipas Lahti U20	Jr. A I-Divisioona	23	7	15	22	18	—	—	—	—	—
1991–92	Reipas Lahti U20	Jr. A I-Divisioona	24	14	16	30	34	—	—	—	—	—
1991–92	Hockey-Reipas	Liiga	12	0	0	0	0	—	—	—	—	—
1991–92	Urheilukoulu	Jr. A SM-sarja	11	3	5	8	16	—	—	—	—	—
1992–93	Reipas Lahti U20	Jr. A I-Divisioona	3	4	2	6	0	—	—	—	—	—
1992–93	Reipas Lahti	Liiga	43	2	5	7	18	—	—	—	—	—
1993–94	Reipas Lahti U20	Jr. A I-Divisioona	2	1	2	3	0	—	—	—	—	—
1993–94	Reipas Lahti	Liiga	43	10	4	14	80	—	—	—	—	—
1994–95	HPK	Liiga	48	4	11	15	40	—	—	—	—	—
1995–96	HPK	Liiga	49	10	8	18	111	9	0	2	2	16
1996–97	HPK	Liiga	43	13	21	34	86	10	2	4	6	2
1997–98	HPK	Liiga	48	12	22	34	53	—	—	—	—	—
1998–99	Jokerit	Liiga	51	11	33	44	64	3	0	2	2	6
1999–00	Jokerit	Liiga	49	9	15	24	58	11	0	0	0	8
2000–01	HIFK	Liiga	38	8	9	17	50	—	—	—	—	—
2000–01	Luleå HF	SHL	10	3	2	5	9	12	0	1	1	16
2001–02	Luleå HF	SHL	50	11	6	17	34	6	1	0	1	6
2002–03	Lahti Pelicans	Liiga	37	9	20	29	38	—	—	—	—	—
2002–03	HIFK	Liiga	14	3	5	8	6	2	0	1	1	2
2003–04	Lahti Pelicans	Liiga	45	13	15	28	32	—	—	—	—	—
2003–04	Leksands IF	SHL	7	3	1	4	6	10	1	1	2	8
2004–05	TPS	Liiga	50	14	16	30	30	5	1	0	1	12
2005–06	TPS	Liiga	56	10	19	29	80	2	2	0	2	4
2006–07	HV71	SHL	55	10	13	23	22	14	3	5	8	10
2007–08	HV71	SHL	54	5	14	19	63	17	2	4	6	6
2008–09	Lahti Pelicans	Liiga	57	9	18	27	46	8	0	4	4	10
2009–10	Lahti Pelicans	Liiga	58	13	20	33	78	—	—	—	—	—
2010–11	Tingsryds AIF	Allsvenskan	52	10	26	36	82	10	1	7	8	4
2011–12	Tingsryds AIF	Allsvenskan	47	0	18	18	36	—	—	—	—	—
2012–13	Lahti Pelicans	Liiga	28	0	6	6	36	—	—	—	—	—
2013–14	KooKoo	Mestis	52	7	27	34	38	16	4	9	13	16
Liiga totals			769	150	247	397	906	62	10	14	24	74

== Awards ==
- (bronze) SM-liiga (1): 1996–97
- (silver) SM-liiga (1): 1999–00
- (gold) Elitserien, Le Mat Trophy (1): 2007–08
- (gold) Mestis champion (1): 2013–14
