= Pavel Boychenko =

Russian ice hockey player (born 1975)

- Born: April 30, 1975 (age 50) Moscow, Russian SFSR, Soviet Union
- Height: 6 ft 0 in (183 cm)
- Weight: 212 lb (96 kg; 15 st 2 lb)
- Position: Right wing
- Shot: Left
- Played for: Krylya Sovetov Moscow; HC CSKA Moscow; HC Lada Togliatti; HC Spartak Moscow; SKA Saint Petersburg; HC Khimik Voskresensk; Vityaz Chekhov; Traktor Chelyabinsk
- NHL draft: Undrafted
- Playing career: 1993–2013

Pavel Boychenko (born April 30, 1975) is a former Russian professional ice hockey player who played in the Russian Superleague (RSL) and Kontinental Hockey League (KHL).
