= Vitali Proshkin =

Russian ice hockey player

- Born: May 8, 1976 (age 49); Elektrostal, Soviet Union
- Height: 6 ft 3 in (191 cm)
- Weight: 198 lb (90 kg; 14 st 2 lb)
- Position: Defence
- Shot: Left
- Played for: HC Dynamo Moscow; Ak Bars Kazan; Salavat Yulaev Ufa
- National team: Russia
- Playing career: 1994–2014

Vitali Vasilevich Proshkin (Russian: Виталий Васильевич Прошкин; born May 8, 1976, in Elektrostal, Soviet Union) is a Russian former professional ice hockey defender. He last played competitively in the Kontinental Hockey League (KHL) for Salavat Yulaev Ufa as the team captain.

He was selected as a reserve by Team Russia for the 2010 Winter Olympics should an injury occur during the tournament.

== Career statistics ==
=== International ===
| Year | Team | Event | Result | GP | G | A | Pts | PIM |
|---|---|---|---|---|---|---|---|---|
| 2003 | Russia | WC | 5th | 7 | 1 | 0 | 1 | 10 |
| 2004 | Russia | WC | 10th | 6 | 0 | 2 | 2 | 4 |
| 2005 | Russia | WC | 3rd place, bronze medalist(s) | 9 | 0 | 0 | 0 | 6 |
| 2007 | Russia | WC | 3rd place, bronze medalist(s) | 9 | 1 | 1 | 2 | 16 |
| 2008 | Russia | WC | 1st place, gold medalist(s) | 8 | 0 | 3 | 3 | 12 |
| 2009 | Russia | WC | 1st place, gold medalist(s) | 9 | 2 | 0 | 2 | 4 |
| Senior totals | | | | 48 | 4 | 6 | 10 | 52 |

== Awards and honours ==
- Russian championship: 2000, 2006, 2007
- European Champions Cup: 2007 (With Ak Bars Kazan)
