= Alexei Chupin =

Russian ice hockey player (born 1972)

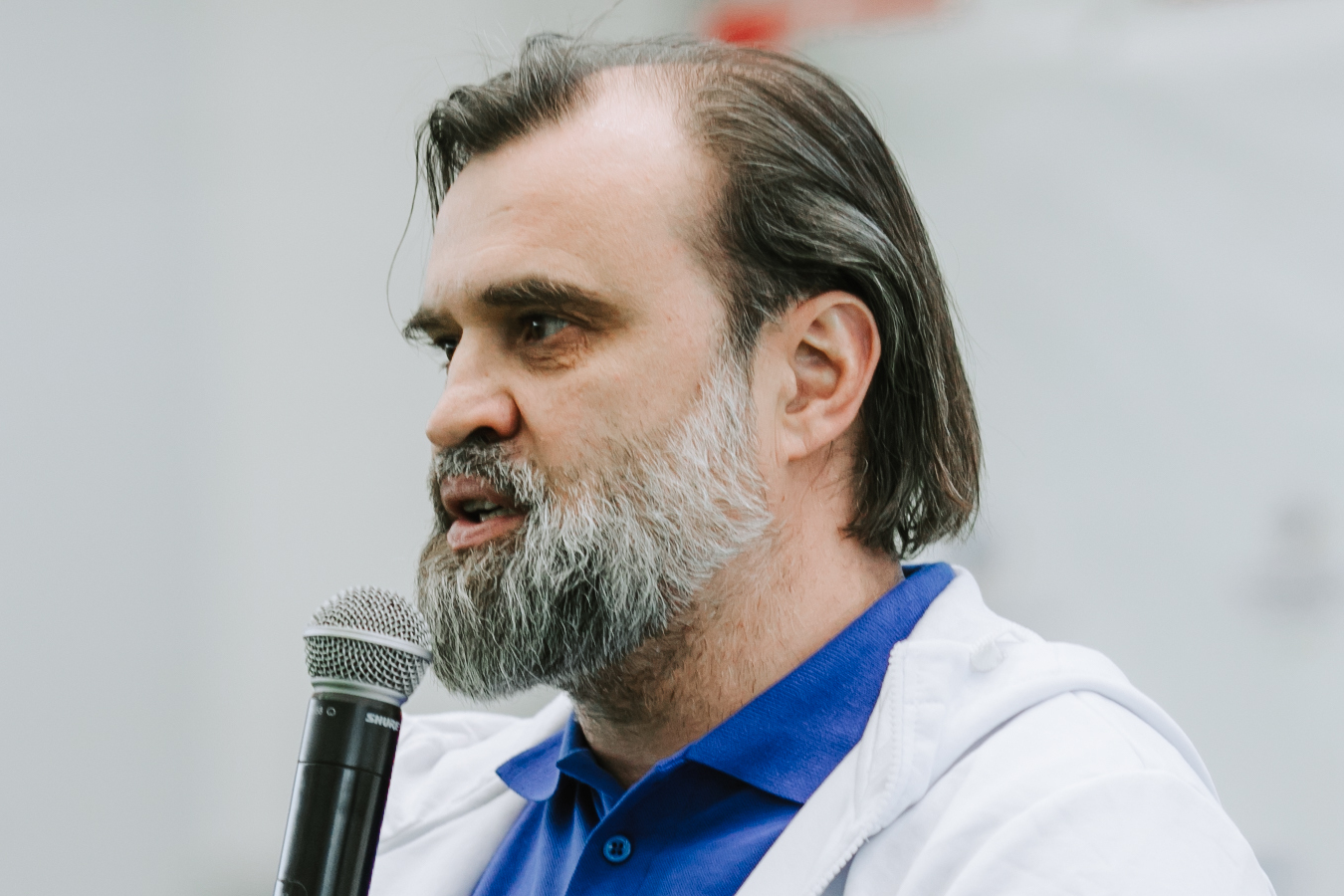
- Born: November 11, 1972 (age 52); Glazov, Russian SFSR, Soviet Union
- Height: 6 ft 1 in (185 cm)
- Weight: 209 lb (95 kg; 14 st 13 lb)
- Position: Centre
- Shot: Left
- Played for: Izhstal Izhevsk; Progress Glazov; Olimpiya Kirovo-Chepetsk; Itil Kazan; Ak Bars Kazan; HC Dynamo Moscow; HC MVD; Metallurg Novokuznetsk
- National team: Russia
- Playing career: 1988–2009

Alexei Chupin (born November 11, 1972) is a Soviet and a Russian former professional ice hockey forward, who played for the Russia in WC 1997 and WC 1998. He is a three-time Russian Champion

== Career statistics ==
			Regular season					Playoffs
Season	Team	League	GP	G	A	Pts	PIM	GP	G	A	Pts	PIM
1988–89	Izhstal Izhevsk	Soviet2	35	7	2	9	8	—	—	—	—	—
1989–90	Izhstal Izhevsk	Soviet2	40	6	5	11	2	—	—	—	—	—
1989–90	Progress Glazov	Soviet3	20	6	4	10	24	—	—	—	—	—
1990–91	Progress Glazov	Soviet3	5	3	0	3	2	—	—	—	—	—
1990–91	Izhstal Izhevsk	Soviet2	62	10	6	16	30	—	—	—	—	—
1991–92	Izhstal Izhevsk	Soviet2	67	28	25	53	85	—	—	—	—	—
1992–93	Olimpiya Kirovo-Chepetsk	Russia2	3	1	0	1	0	—	—	—	—	—
1992–93	Itil Kazan	Russia	42	16	9	25	24	—	—	—	—	—
1993–94	Itil Kazan	Russia	36	16	9	25	44	5	3	0	3	2
1994–95	Itil Kazan	Russia	49	23	14	37	87	2	0	0	0	2
1994–95	Itil Kazan-2	Russia2	2	0	0	0	0	—	—	—	—	—
1995–96	Ak Bars Kazan	Russia	44	11	12	23	38	—	—	—	—	—
1996–97	Ak Bars Kazan	Russia	33	16	4	20	42	3	0	1	1	2
1997–98	Ak Bars Kazan	Russia	46	16	19	35	83	5	1	5	6	6
1998–99	Ak Bars Kazan	Russia	40	6	10	16	44	11	1	2	3	6
1999–00	Ak Bars Kazan	Russia	28	16	12	28	48	15	2	2	4	45
1999–00	Ak Bars Kazan-2	Russia3	1	0	5	5	4	—	—	—	—	—
2000–01	Ak Bars Kazan	Russia	34	8	11	19	56	4	1	0	1	2
2001–02	Ak Bars Kazan	Russia	48	13	17	30	89	8	4	1	5	12
2002–03	Ak Bars Kazan	Russia	50	9	21	30	99	5	1	2	3	12
2003–04	HC Dynamo Moscow	Russia	58	11	20	31	136	3	0	0	0	4
2004–05	HC Dynamo Moscow	Russia	47	16	16	32	107	10	2	3	5	12
2005–06	Ak Bars Kazan	Russia	39	3	9	12	58	—	—	—	—	—
2006–07	HC MVD	Russia	53	15	30	45	103	—	—	—	—	—
2007–08	HC Dynamo Moscow	Russia	37	5	11	16	52	9	1	0	1	10
2008–09	Metallurg Novokuznetsk	KHL	48	9	11	20	52	—	—	—	—	—
Russia totals			684	200	224	424	1,110	80	16	16	32	115

== Awards and honors ==
Award	Year
Russian Superleague
Winner (Ak Bars Kazan)	1998
Winner (HC Dynamo Moscow)	2005
Winner (Ak Bars Kazan)	2006
