= Michal Mikeska =

Czech ice hockey player

- Born: 28 April 1976 (age 48); Zlín, Czechoslovakia
- Height: 6 ft 1 in (185 cm)
- Weight: 187 lb (85 kg; 13 st 5 lb)
- Position: Forward
- Shoots: Left
- Czech Extraliga team: HC České Budějovice
- Playing career: 1998–present

Michal Mikeska (born 28 April 1976 in Zlín) is a Czech professional ice hockey player currently playing for HC České Budějovice signed a contract after leaving team Salavat Yulaev Ufa in the Kontinental Hockey League.

Mikeska began playing for HC Pardubice in the Czech Extraliga. After spending one season with HC Havířov, he returned to Pardubice and remained with the team for the next seven seasons. His best season came in 2004-05 where he led the league in points, scoring 21 goals and 34 assists for 55 points in 50 games. The next season was a disappointment as he only managed just 7 goals in 46 games.

It turned out to be Mikeska's final season with the team as he moved on to play in Russia with Salavat Yulaev Ufa in 2006. He had an impressive first season with the team, scoring 13 goals and 24 assists for 37 points, only Vladimir Antipov scored more points for the team.
