= Aleksander Suglobov =

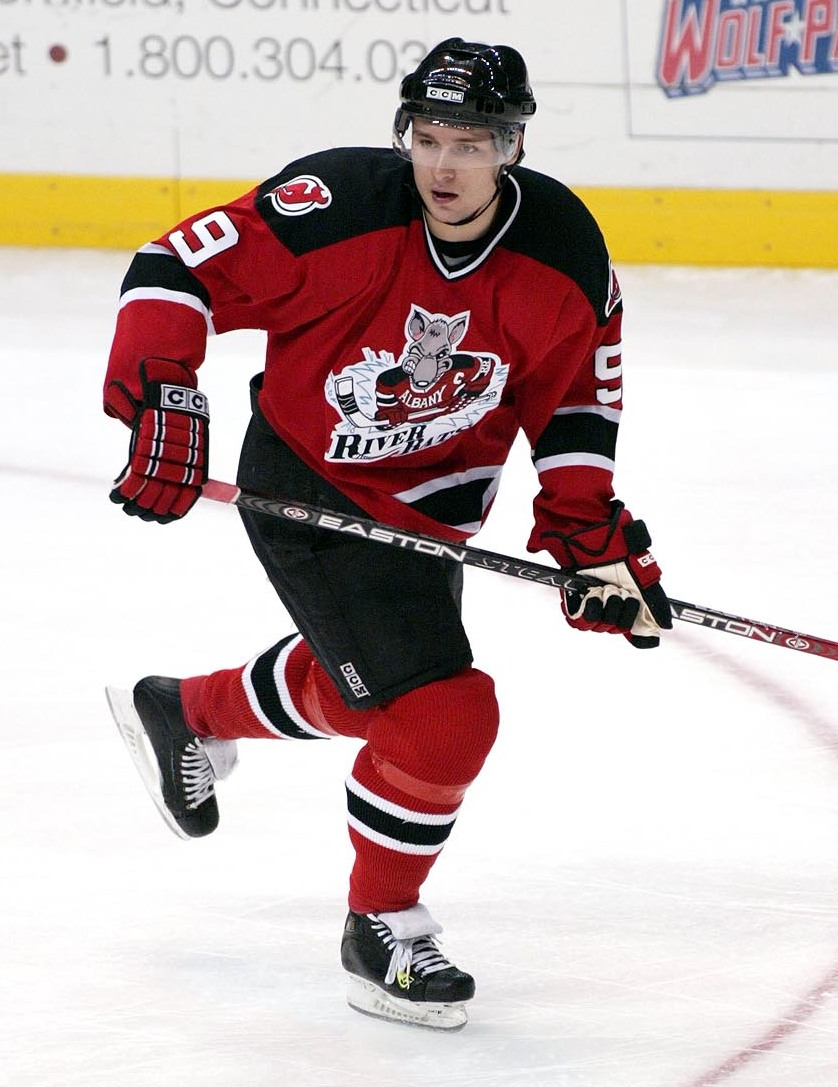
- Suglobov with the Albany River Rats in 2005
- Born: 15 January 1982 (age 44) Elektrostal, Russian SFSR, Soviet Union
- Height: 6 ft 1 in (185 cm)
- Weight: 205 lb (93 kg; 14 st 9 lb)
- Position: Right wing
- Shot: Left
- Played for: New Jersey Devils; Toronto Maple Leafs; Spartak Moscow; SKA St. Petersburg; Salavat Yulaev Ufa; Lokomotiv Yaroslavl; Neftekhimik Nizhnekamsk; CSKA Moscow; Torpedo Nizhny Novgorod; Sibir Novosibirsk
- National team: Russia
- NHL draft: 56th overall, 2000; New Jersey Devils
- Playing career: 1998–2013
Medal record
World Junior Championships
Gold medal – first place	2002 Czech Republic

Aleksander Mikhailovich Suglobov (Russian: Алекса́ндр Миха́йлович Сугло́бов; born 15 January 1982) is a Russian former professional ice hockey right wing. He played 18 games in the National Hockey League with the New Jersey Devils and Toronto Maple Leafs between 2004 and 2006. The rest of his career, which lasted from 1998 to 2013, was mainly spent in the Russian Superleague and Kontinental Hockey League, where he played for several teams. Internationally Suglovov played for the Russian national team once each at the World Junior Championships and World Championships, winning a gold medal at the 2002 World Juniors.

== Playing career ==
Suglobov was drafted in the second round, 56th overall by the New Jersey Devils in the 2000 NHL entry draft.

Suglobov made his NHL debut with the Devils during the 2003–04 NHL season, playing one game in which he registered two shots. He spent most of that season with the Albany River Rats, the Devils' American Hockey League (AHL) affiliate. He put up 22 points in 35 games with the River Rats in that, his first season.

On December 17, 2005, Suglobov scored his first NHL goal with the Devils in Carolina against the Hurricanes.

On March 8, 2006 Suglobov was traded to the Toronto Maple Leafs for Ken Klee.

Unable to break into the NHL, Suglobov left for Russia on May 21, 2007, signing with CSKA Moscow of the Russian Superleague.

== Honors ==
- Played for PlanetUSA All-Stars at the 2006 AHL All-Star Classic in Winnipeg.

== Career statistics ==
=== Regular season and playoffs ===
			Regular season					Playoffs
Season	Team	League	GP	G	A	Pts	PIM	GP	G	A	Pts	PIM
1998–99	Spartak Moscow	RSL	1	0	0	0	0	—	—	—	—	—
1998–99	Spartak–2 Moscow	RUS-3	1	0	0	0	0	—	—	—	—	—
1999–00	Torpedo–2 Yaroslavl	RUS-3	38	24	10	34	57	—	—	—	—	—
2000–01	SKA Saint Petersburg	RSL	8	1	0	1	6	—	—	—	—	—
2000–01	Salavat Yulaev Ufa	RSL	6	0	0	0	4	—	—	—	—	—
2000–01	Lokomotiv Yaroslavl	RSL	4	0	0	0	2	11	1	2	3	6
2000–01	Lokomotiv–2 Yaroslavl	RUS-3	23	15	15	30	64	—	—	—	—	—
2001–02	Lokomotiv Yaroslavl	RSL	24	4	1	5	26	5	1	1	2	18
2001–02	Lokomotiv–2 Yaroslavl	RUS-3	6	5	2	7	20	—	—	—	—	—
2002–03	Neftekhimik Nizhnekamsk	RSL	6	0	0	0	4	—	—	—	—	—
2002–03	Neftekhimik–2 Nizhnekamsk	RUS-3	1	0	1	1	2	—	—	—	—	—
2002–03	Lokomotiv Yaroslavl	RSL	17	4	2	6	12	5	1	0	1	2
2002–03	Lokomotiv–2 Yaroslavl	RUS-3	8	13	5	18	49	—	—	—	—	—
2003–04	Albany River Rats	AHL	35	11	11	22	54	—	—	—	—	—
2003–04	New Jersey Devils	NHL	1	0	0	0	0	—	—	—	—	—
2004–05	Albany River Rats	AHL	72	25	21	46	77	—	—	—	—	—
2005–06	Albany River Rats	AHL	51	25	23	48	52	—	—	—	—	—
2005–06	New Jersey Devils	NHL	1	1	0	1	0	—	—	—	—	—
2005–06	Toronto Marlies	AHL	15	8	2	10	21	5	5	2	7	2
2005–06	Toronto Maple Leafs	NHL	2	0	0	0	0	—	—	—	—	—
2006–07	Toronto Marlies	AHL	32	3	10	13	16	—	—	—	—	—
2006–07	Toronto Maple Leafs	NHL	14	0	0	0	4	—	—	—	—	—
2007–08	SKA Saint Petersburg	RSL	5	1	0	1	12	—	—	—	—	—
2007–08	CSKA Moscow	RSL	33	10	3	13	41	6	4	1	5	29
2008–09	CSKA Moscow	KHL	54	14	15	29	67	8	0	1	1	4
2009–10	CSKA Moscow	KHL	37	12	14	26	22	3	0	0	0	4
2010–11	Spartak Moscow	KHL	14	3	4	7	8	—	—	—	—	—
2010–11	CSKA Moscow	KHL	15	5	4	9	4	—	—	—	—	—
2011–12	Torpedo Nizhny Novgorod	KHL	4	0	1	1	2	—	—	—	—	—
2011–12	Sibir Novosibirsk	KHL	31	13	6	19	16	—	—	—	—	—
2012–13	Traktor Chelyabinsk	KHL	15	2	5	7	2	—	—	—	—	—
2012–13	Spartak Moscow	KHL	29	5	9	14	18	—	—	—	—	—
RSL totals			103	20	6	26	107	27	7	4	11	55
NHL totals			18	1	0	1	4	—	—	—	—	—
KHL totals			199	54	56	110	114	11	0	1	1	8

=== International ===
Year	Team	Event	GP	G	A	Pts	PIM
2002	Russia	WJC	7	1	0	1	4
2003	Russia	WC	7	3	0	3	2
Junior totals			7	1	0	1	4
Senior totals			7	3	0	3	2
