= Sergei Zinovjev =

Russian ice hockey player

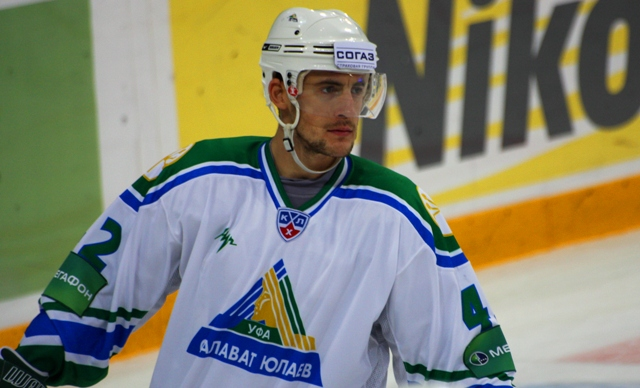
- Born: March 4, 1980 (age 46) Prokopyevsk, Russian SFSR, Soviet Union
- Height: 5 ft 11 in (180 cm)
- Weight: 176 lb (80 kg; 12 st 8 lb)
- Position: Centre
- Shot: Left
- Played for: Metallurg Novokuznetsk; Salavat Yulaev Ufa; Lokomotiv Yaroslavl; Spartak Moscow; Ak Bars Kazan; Boston Bruins; Dynamo Moscow
- National team: Russia
- NHL draft: 73rd overall, 2000; Boston Bruins
- Playing career: 1998–2014

Sergei Olegovich Zinovjev (Russian: Серге́й Олегович Зиновьев; born March 4, 1980) is a Russian former professional ice hockey centre and General Manager of his original club, Metallurg Novokuznetsk of the Kontinental Hockey League (KHL). He is two-time World Champion (2008, 2009) for the Russian national team.

Zinovjev was selected 73rd overall by the Boston Bruins in the 2000 NHL entry draft. Zinovjev has played ten career NHL games, scoring one assist. In 2004, Zinovjev was released from the Russian national team after testing positive for marijuana. In July 2009, he signed a five-year contract in a return with Salavat Yulaev Ufa. He concluded his 16-year professional career following the 2013–14 season.

== Career statistics ==
=== Regular season and playoffs ===
			Regular season					Playoffs
Season	Team	League	GP	G	A	Pts	PIM	GP	G	A	Pts	PIM
1995–96	Metallurg–2 Novokuznetsk	RUS.2	10	1	0	1	2	—	—	—	—	—
1996–97	Metallurg–2 Novokuznetsk	RUS.3	29	2	1	3	8	—	—	—	—	—
1997–98	Metallurg–2 Novokuznetsk	RUS.3	40	7	7	14	36	—	—	—	—	—
1998–99	Metallurg Novokuznetsk	RSL	31	2	4	6	10	2	0	0	0	0
1998–99	Metallurg–2 Novokuznetsk	RUS.3	4	0	1	1	8	—	—	—	—	—
1999–2000	Metallurg Novokuznetsk	RSL	28	0	2	2	16	—	—	—	—	—
2000–01	Salavat Yulaev Ufa	RSL	8	4	5	9	6	—	—	—	—	—
2000–01	Lokomotiv Yaroslavl	RSL	27	2	10	12	36	—	—	—	—	—
2000–01	Lokomotiv–2 Yaroslavl	RUS.3	4	4	0	4	6	—	—	—	—	—
2001–02	Spartak Moscow	RSL	50	12	18	30	41	—	—	—	—	—
2002–03	Ak Bars Kazan	RSL	47	14	17	31	50	5	1	1	2	6
2003–04	Providence Bruins	AHL	4	1	2	3	0	—	—	—	—	—
2003–04	Boston Bruins	NHL	10	0	1	1	2	—	—	—	—	—
2003–04	Ak Bars Kazan	RSL	27	5	8	13	63	8	0	1	1	14
2004–05	Ak Bars Kazan	RSL	53	17	20	37	82	4	1	0	1	12
2005–06	Ak Bars Kazan	RSL	43	15	26	41	58	13	9	8	17	26
2006–07	Ak Bars Kazan	RSL	41	19	34	53	105	16	7	10	17	20
2007–08	Ak Bars Kazan	RSL	37	9	21	30	53	10	4	7	11	16
2008–09	Ak Bars Kazan	KHL	10	1	1	2	8	—	—	—	—	—
2008–09	Dynamo Moscow	KHL	15	8	4	12	12	12	3	6	9	14
2009–10	Salavat Yulaev Ufa	KHL	47	17	36	53	83	—	—	—	—	—
2010–11	Salavat Yulaev Ufa	KHL	43	11	14	25	52	21	5	5	10	20
2011–12	Salavat Yulaev Ufa	KHL	48	7	19	26	67	3	1	0	1	2
2012–13	Salavat Yulaev Ufa	KHL	47	9	16	25	61	14	3	7	10	24
2013–14	Salavat Yulaev Ufa	KHL	22	4	5	9	41	8	1	2	3	10
RSL totals			394	100	165	265	520	58	22	27	49	94
NHL totals			10	0	1	1	2	—	—	—	—	—
KHL totals			232	57	95	152	324	58	13	20	33	70

=== International ===
Medal record

Representing Russia

Men's ice hockey

World Championships
Gold medal – first place	2009 Switzerland	
Gold medal – first place	2008 Canada	
Bronze medal – third place	2007 Russia	
Bronze medal – third place	2005 Austria	

Year	Team	Event	GP	G	A	Pts	PIM
2000	Russia	WJC	7	2	3	5	6
2003	Russia	WC	7	0	2	2	22
2005	Russia	WC	6	1	2	3	20
2007	Russia	WC	9	3	10	13	12
2008	Russia	WC	9	1	5	6	12
2009	Russia	WC	9	1	4	5	6
2010	Russia	OG	4	0	2	2	0
2011	Russia	WC	9	4	3	7	4
Junior totals			7	2	3	5	6
Senior totals			53	10	28	38	76

== Awards & honors ==
- 2000 Junior World Silver medal: Russian national team
- 2004 Russia Championship Bronze medal: Ak Bars Kazan
- 2005 World Championship Bronze medal: Russian national team
- 2006 RSL Champion: Ak Bars Kazan
- 2007 European Champions Cup Winner: Ak Bars Kazan
- 2007 World Championship Bronze medal: Russian national team
- 2007–08 Continental Cup Winner: Ak Bars Kazan
- 2008 World Champion: Russia national team
- 2008 Spengler Cup Winner: Dynamo Moscow
- 2009 KHL All-Star
- 2009 World Champion: Russia national team
- 2011 Gagarin Cup Champion: Salavat Yulaev Ufa
