= Vladimir Antipov =

Russian ice hockey player (born 1978)

- Born: January 14, 1978 (age 48) Apatity, Soviet Union
- Height: 6 ft 1 in (185 cm)
- Weight: 180 lb (82 kg; 12 st 12 lb)
- Position: Left wing
- Shot: Left
- Played for: Lokomotiv Yaroslavl; St. John's Maple Leafs; Salavat Yulaev Ufa; Traktor Chelyabinsk; Severstal Cherepovets
- National team: Russia
- NHL draft: 103rd overall, 1996; Toronto Maple Leafs
- Playing career: 1996–2014

Vladimir Borisovich Antipov (Russian: Владимир Борисович Антипов; born January 14, 1978) is a Russian former professional ice hockey player who was last signed to play for CSKA Sofia in the Bulgarian Hockey League (BHL).

== Playing career ==
Antipov began playing for Torpedo Yaroslavl, playing on their junior team. He was then drafted 103rd overall by the Toronto Maple Leafs in the 1996 NHL entry draft and Antipov was promoted to the senior team. In 1999, Antipov signed with the Maple Leafs organization and in a two-year stay he had spells in the American Hockey League with the St. John's Maple Leafs, the ECHL with the South Carolina Stingrays and the International Hockey League with the Long Beach Ice Dogs but never managed to play in the National Hockey League.

Antipov soon returned to Russia and re-signed with Yaroslavl who changed their name from Torpedo to Lokomotiv. Antipov would be ever present with the team for the next five seasons until 2006 where he signed for Salavat Yulaev Ufa.

== Career statistics ==
=== Regular season and playoffs ===
| | | | Regular season | | | | | Playoffs |
| Season | Team | League | GP | G | A | Pts | PIM | GP | G | A | Pts | PIM |
|---|---|---|---|---|---|---|---|---|---|---|---|---|
| 1996–97 | Torpedo Yaroslavl | RSL | 27 | 6 | 4 | 10 | 22 | 2 | 0 | 0 | 0 | 0 |
| 1997–98 | Torpedo Yaroslavl | RSL | 41 | 9 | 3 | 12 | 57 | — | — | — | — | — |
| 1998–99 | Torpedo Yaroslavl | RSL | 42 | 7 | 13 | 20 | 30 | 10 | 2 | 2 | 4 | 10 |
| 1999–00 | South Carolina Stingrays | ECHL | 4 | 0 | 4 | 4 | 2 | — | — | — | — | — |
| 1999–00 | St. John's Maple Leafs | AHL | 45 | 6 | 7 | 13 | 14 | — | — | — | — | — |
| 1999–00 | Long Beach Ice Dogs | IHL | 16 | 3 | 3 | 6 | 18 | 1 | 0 | 0 | 0 | 0 |
| 2000–01 | St. John's Maple Leafs | AHL | 9 | 1 | 1 | 2 | 2 | — | — | — | — | — |
| 2000–01 | Lokomotiv Yaroslavl | RSL | 22 | 5 | 4 | 9 | 44 | 11 | 2 | 1 | 3 | 8 |
| 2001–02 | Lokomotiv Yaroslavl | RSL | 50 | 8 | 12 | 20 | 48 | 9 | 3 | 2 | 5 | 14 |
| 2002–03 | Lokomotiv Yaroslavl | RSL | 50 | 14 | 15 | 29 | 42 | 10 | 4 | 3 | 7 | 6 |
| 2003–04 | Lokomotiv Yaroslavl | RSL | 50 | 13 | 12 | 25 | 32 | 3 | 0 | 0 | 0 | 0 |
| 2004–05 | Lokomotiv Yaroslavl | RSL | 58 | 18 | 22 | 40 | 65 | 7 | 0 | 1 | 1 | 4 |
| 2005–06 | Lokomotiv Yaroslavl | RSL | 44 | 14 | 19 | 33 | 20 | 10 | 2 | 5 | 7 | 10 |
| 2006–07 | Salavat Yulaev Ufa | RSL | 53 | 21 | 22 | 43 | 32 | 6 | 1 | 2 | 3 | 0 |
| 2007–08 | Salavat Yulaev Ufa | RSL | 50 | 14 | 15 | 29 | 70 | 16 | 5 | 2 | 7 | 18 |
| 2008–09 | Salavat Yulaev Ufa | KHL | 49 | 20 | 15 | 35 | 26 | 4 | 1 | 0 | 1 | 0 |
| 2009–10 | Salavat Yulaev Ufa | KHL | 56 | 11 | 20 | 31 | 45 | 15 | 4 | 3 | 7 | 27 |
| 2010–11 | Salavat Yulaev Ufa | KHL | 49 | 11 | 14 | 25 | 22 | 18 | 3 | 1 | 4 | 6 |
| 2011–12 | Traktor Chelyabinsk | KHL | 54 | 10 | 16 | 26 | 14 | 10 | 7 | 1 | 8 | 2 |
| 2012–13 | Traktor Chelyabinsk | KHL | 43 | 8 | 10 | 18 | 12 | 25 | 3 | 7 | 10 | 2 |
| 2013–14 | Severstal Cherepovets | KHL | 34 | 4 | 8 | 12 | 12 | — | — | — | — | — |
| RSL totals | | | 487 | 129 | 141 | 270 | 462 | 84 | 19 | 18 | 37 | 70 |
| KHL totals | | | 285 | 64 | 84 | 148 | 131 | 72 | 18 | 12 | 30 | 37 |

=== International ===
| Year | Team | Event | Result | GP | G | A | Pts | PIM |
|---|---|---|---|---|---|---|---|---|
| 1996 | Russia | EJC | 1st place, gold medalist(s) | 5 | 5 | 2 | 7 | 0 |
| 1997 | Russia | WJC | 3rd place, bronze medalist(s) | 6 | 1 | 1 | 2 | 0 |
| 1998 | Russia | WJC | 2nd place, silver medalist(s) | 7 | 0 | 3 | 3 | 0 |
| 2002 | Russia | WC | 2nd place, silver medalist(s) | 9 | 1 | 2 | 3 | 2 |
| 2003 | Russia | WC | 5th | 7 | 1 | 3 | 4 | 2 |
| 2004 | Russia | WC | 10th | 6 | 0 | 1 | 1 | 0 |
| 2005 | Russia | WC | 3rd place, bronze medalist(s) | 7 | 0 | 1 | 1 | 2 |
| Senior totals | | | | 29 | 2 | 7 | 9 | 6 |
