= 2003 Baltika Cup =

Tournament details
- Host country: Russia
- City: Moscow
- Venue: 1 (in 1 host city)
- Dates: 18–21 December 2003
- Teams: 4

Final positions
- Champions: Finland (1st title)
- Runners-up: Czech Republic
- Third place: Russia
- Fourth place: Sweden

Tournament statistics
- Games played: 6
- Goals scored: 26 (4.33 per game)
- Attendance: 32,850 (5,475 per game)
- Scoring leader: (Czech Republic) Petr Průcha (4 points)

The 2003 Baltika Cup was played between 18 and 21 December 2003. The Czech Republic, Finland, Sweden and Russia played a round-robin for a total of three games per team and six games in total. All of the matches were played in the Luzhniki Palace of Sports in Moscow, Russia. Finland won the tournament. The tournament was part of the 2003–04 Euro Hockey Tour.

== Standings ==
Pos	Team	Pld	W	OTW	SOW	OTL	SOL	L	GF	GA	GD	Pts
1	Finland	3	2	0	0	0	0	1	6	7	−1	6
2	Czech Republic	3	1	0	0	0	2	0	9	7	+2	5
3	Russia	3	0	0	2	0	0	1	6	6	0	4
4	Sweden	3	0	0	1	0	1	1	5	6	−1	3

Source: swehockey

== Games ==
All times are local. Moscow – (Moscow Time – UTC+4)

18 December 2003; 15:00	Czech Republic	2-3 GWS (0-1, 2-0, 0-1) (OT: 0-0) (SO: 0-1)	Sweden	Luzhniki Palace of Sports, Moscow; Attendance: 1,000

Game reference

Adam Svoboda
Goalies
Stefan Liv
Referee:
(Russia) Vyacheslav Bulanov
Linesmen:
(Russia) Prokhorov
(Russia) Mikhail Buturlin

	0-1	Rhodin (Johansson) – 15:52
Kolář (Průcha) – 25:33	1-1
Novák (Hejda) (PP) – 27:54	2-1
	2-2	42:59 – Carlsson (Persson) (PP)

Divíšek (miss)
Sup (miss)
Marek (miss)
Shootout
(miss) Eriksson
(miss) Kahnberg
Nordgren
12 min
Penalties
18 min
37
Shots
20

18 December 2003; 18:30	Russia	1-3 (1-1, 0-1, 0-1)	Finland	Luzhniki Palace of Sports, Moscow; Attendance: 7,000

Game reference

Maxim Sokolov
Goalies
Fredrik Norrena
Referee:
(Sweden) Christer Lärking
Linesmen:
(Russia) Makarov
(Russia) Konstantin Olenin

Sushinsky (Tverdovsky, Zatonsky) (PP) – 06:24	1-0
	1-1	15:29 – Sahlstedt (Virta, Eloranta)
	1-2	29:09 – Niskala (Rintanen) (PP)
	1-3	44:02 – Voutilainen (Nummelin, Dahlman)

8 min
Penalties
14 min
24
Shots
19

20 December 2003; 13:00	Sweden	1-2 GWS (0-0, 1-1, 0-0) (OT: 0-0) (SO: 0-1)	Russia	Luzhniki Palace of Sports, Moscow; Attendance: 7,000

Game reference
Daniel Henriksson	Goalies	Yegor Podomatsky	Referee: (Finland) Tom Laaksonen; Linesmen: (Russia) Yury Oskirko (Finland) Dmitry Selianin
Kahnberg – 22:20 / 1-0; / 1-1 / 27:13 – Sushinsky (Skopintsev) (SHG)			Referee: (Finland) Tom Laaksonen; Linesmen: (Russia) Yury Oskirko (Finland) Dmitry Selianin
Nordgren (miss)	Shootout	Kovalenko	Referee: (Finland) Tom Laaksonen; Linesmen: (Russia) Yury Oskirko (Finland) Dmitry Selianin
20 min	Penalties	10 min	Referee: (Finland) Tom Laaksonen; Linesmen: (Russia) Yury Oskirko (Finland) Dmitry Selianin
14	Shots	36	Referee: (Finland) Tom Laaksonen; Linesmen: (Russia) Yury Oskirko (Finland) Dmitry Selianin

20 December 2003; 17:00	Finland	1-5 (1-1, 0-0, 0-4)	Czech Republic	Luzhniki Palace of Sports, Moscow; Attendance: 3,500

Game reference

Mika Lehto
Goalies
Adam Svoboda
Referee:
(Russia) Igor Zakharov
Linesmen:
(Russia) Viktor Gashilov
(Russia) Konstantin Gordenko

	0-1	03:18 – Sup (Divíšek)
Kuhta (Karalahti) – 11:01	1-1
	1-2	40:58 – Průcha (Hamr)
	1-3	43:54 – Koukal (Průcha)
	1-4	44:58 – Dlouhý (Marek)
	1-5	50:36 – Hlinka (Divíšek, Malinský)

10 min
Penalties
8 min
20
Shots
24

20 December 2003; 13:00	Russia	3-2 GWS (1-1, 1-0, 0-1) (OT: 0-0) (SO: 1-0)	Czech Republic	Luzhniki Palace of Sports, Moscow; Attendance: 9,000

Game reference

Yegor Podomatsky
Goalies
Dušan Salfický
Referee:
(Finland) Tom Laaksonen
Linesmen:
(Russia) Yury Oskirko
(Finland) Dmitry Selianin

	0-1	03:36 – Průcha (Kolář)
Prokopyev – 07:38	1-1
Guskov (Yachmenev, Butsayev) – 31:54	2-1
	2-2	57:11 – Hlinka (Divíšek, Koukal) (PP)

Kovalenko
Kovalenko
Kovalenko
Shootout
Sup
Průcha
(miss) Průcha
10 min
Penalties
6 min
36
Shots
23

20 December 2003; 16:30	Finland	2-1 (0-0, 1-1, 1-0)	Sweden	Luzhniki Palace of Sports, Moscow; Attendance: 5,350

Game reference

Fredrik Norrena
Goalies
Stefan Liv
Referee:
(Russia) Igor Zakharov
Linesmen:
(Russia) Yury Oskirko
(Finland) Dmitry Selianin

Aalto (Nummelin) – 20:30	1-0
	1-1	23:52 – Eriksson (Rhodin)
Kuhta (Peltonen, Söderholm) – 59:43	2-1

10 min
Penalties
10 min
28
Shots
23

== Scoring leaders ==
Pos	Player	Country	GP	G	A	Pts	+/−	PIM	POS
1	Petr Průcha	Czech Republic	3	2	2	4	+4	0	LW
2	Tomáš Divíšek	Czech Republic	3	3	3	3	+2	8	CE
3	Jaroslav Hlinka	Czech Republic	3	2	0	2	+2	0	CE
3	Kimmo Kuhta	Finland	3	2	0	2	+2	0	LW
5	Andrei Kovalenko	Russia	3	2	0	2	+1	0	LD

GP = Games played; G = Goals; A = Assists; Pts = Points; +/− = Plus/minus; PIM = Penalties in minutes; POS = Position
Source: swehockey

== Goaltending leaders ==
Pos	Player	Country	TOI	GA	GAA	Sv%	SO
1	Fredrik Norrena	Finland	120:00	2	1.00	95.74	0
2	Fredrik Norrena	Sweden	125:00	4	1.92	93.55	0
3	Yegor Podomatsky	Russia	130:00	3	1.38	91.67	0
4	Adam Svoboda	Czech Republic	125:01	4	1.92	89.19	0

TOI = Time on ice (minutes:seconds); SA = Shots against; GA = Goals against; GAA = Goals Against Average; Sv% = Save percentage; SO = Shutouts
Source: swehockey

== Tournament awards ==
The tournament directorate named the following players in the tournament 2003:

- Best goalkeeper: (Finland) Fredrik Norrena
- Best defenceman: (Sweden) Thomas Rhodin
- Best forward: (Czech Republic) Petr Průcha

Media All-Star Team:

- Goaltender: (Sweden) Stefan Liv
- Defence: (Sweden) Thomas Rhodin, (Finland) Petteri Nummelin
- Forwards: (Sweden) Magnus Kahnberg, (Czech Republic) etr Koukal, (Russia) Maxim Sushinsky
