= 2011 LG Hockey Games =

Tournament details
- Host countries: Sweden; Russia
- Cities: Stockholm; Mytishchi
- Venues: 2 (in 2 host cities)
- Dates: 11–13 February 2011
- Teams: 4

Final positions
- Champions: Sweden (11th title)
- Runners-up: Russia
- Third place: Finland
- Fourth place: Czech Republic

Tournament statistics
- Games played: 6
- Goals scored: 39 (6.5 per game)
- Attendance: 40,200 (6,700 per game)
- Scoring leader: (Sweden) Dick Axelsson (6 points)

The 2011 LG Hockey Games was played between 10 and 13 February 2011. The Czech Republic, Finland, Sweden and Russia played a round-robin for a total of three games per team and six games in total. Five matches were played in Globen in Stockholm, Sweden, and one match were played in Mytishchi Arena in Mytishchi, Russia. The tournament was a part of the 2010–11 Euro Hockey Tour.

Sweden won the tournament ahead of Russia and Finland.

== Standings ==
Pos	Team	Pld	W	OTW	OTL	L	GF	GA	GD	Pts
1	Sweden	3	2	1	0	0	15	5	+10	8
2	Russia	3	2	0	0	1	11	11	0	6
3	Finland	3	0	1	1	1	8	10	−2	3
4	Czech Republic	3	0	0	1	2	5	13	−8	1

Source: eurohockey

== Games ==
All times are local. Stockholm – (Central European Time – UTC+1) Mytishchi – (Eastern European Time – UTC+2)

10 February 2011; 20:00	Russia	5–3 (1–1, 2–0, 2–2)	Finland	Mytishchi Arena, Mytishchi; Attendance: 7,200

Mikhail Biryukov
Goalies
Karri Rämö
Referees:
(Czech Republic) Martin Frano
(Czech Republic) Jan Hribik

	0–1	10:00 – (PP) T. Santala (M. Mäenpää)
A. Kalyanin – 17:01	1–1
E. Artyukhin (M. Afinogenov) – 27:13	2–1
A. Kalyanin (G. Churilov, A. Guskov (PP) – 35:36	3–1
Y. Trubachev (E. Kuznetsov, N. Belov) (PP) – 49:56	4–1
	4–2	54:23 – J. Lajunen (P. Wirtanen, M. Mäenpää)
	4–3	54:55 – O. Louhivaara (J. Karalahti)
M. Afinogenov (A. Glukhov, E. Artyukhin) – 59:30	5–3

8 min
Penalties
24 min
22
Shots
29

10 February 2011; 19:30	Czech Republic	1–6 (1–2, 0–2, 0–2)	Sweden	Ericsson Globe, Stockholm; Attendance: 6,613

Jakub Štěpánek
Goalies
Stefan Liv
Referees:
(Finland) Tatu Savolainen
(Finland) Tom Laaksonen

	0–1	05:42 – (PP) N. Persson (M. Johansson, J. Lindström)
P. Průcha (J. Nakládal, T. Mojžíš) – 09:41	1–1
	1–2	18:22 – D. Petrasek (D. Axelsson, J. Andersson)
	1–3	29:51 – (SH) D. Axelsson (R. Wallin)
	1–4	35:20 – M. Tjärnqvist (M. Johansson, J. Ericsson)
	1–5	40:13 – N. Nordgren (N. Persson, M. Johansson)
	1–6	56:12 – J. Andersson (D. Axelsson)

41 min
Penalties
10 min
29
Shots
34

12 February 2011; 12:00	Finland	3–2 OT (1–0, 1–1, 0–1) (OT: 1–0)	Czech Republic	Ericsson Globe, Stockholm; Attendance: 4,100

Teemu Lassila
Goalies
Alexander Salák
Referees:
(Sweden) Christer Lärking
(Sweden) Mikael Nord

J. Aaltonen (S. Vatanen, P. Kontiola) (PP) – 17:05	1–0
	1–1	22:54 – P. Jansky (P. Koukal, I. Rachunek)
J. Puustinen (T. Laine, P. Puistola) (PP) – 37:48	2–1
	2–2	40:52 – O. Němec (J. Novotný, P. Čáslava)
T. Laine – 62:11	3–2

10 min
Penalties
18 min
30
Shots
33

12 February 2011; 16:00	Sweden	6–2 (4–0, 0–0, 2–2)	Russia	Ericsson Globe, Stockholm; Attendance: 11,071

Stefan Liv
Goalies
Mikhail Biryukov (out 07:33) (in 53:35)
Aleksei Volkov (in 07:33) (out 53:35)
Referees:
(Finland) Tatu Savolainen
(Finland) Tom Laaksonen

M. Thörnberg (M. Krüger, B. Melin) – 02:04	1–0
M. Krüger (D. Axelsson, J. Andersson) – 04:05	2–0
D. Petrasek (J. Andersson, D. Axelsson) (PP) – 06:45	3–0
M. Johansson (B. Melin, M. Thörnberg) – 07:33	4–0
D. Axelsson (M. Sjögren) – 40:18	5–0
	5–1	45:27 – E. Kuznetsov (Y. Trubachev, V. Atyushov)
M. Thörnberg (N. Persson) – 47:50	6–1
	6–2	52:15 – A. Galimov (G. Churilov)

18 min
Penalties
24 min
35
Shots
26

13 February 2011; 12:00	Russia	4–2 (1–1, 1–0, 2–1)	Czech Republic	Ericsson Globe, Stockholm; Attendance: 1,857

Mikhail Biryukov
Goalies
Jakub Štěpánek
Referees:
(Sweden) Sören Persson
(Sweden) Morgan Johansson

	0–1	06:00 – O. Němec
M. Rybin (D. Parshin, A. Yemelin) – 07:02	1–1
M. Rybin (D. Parshin) – 38:26	2–1
A. Galimov (G. Churilov) (PP) – 45:06	3–1
E. Kuznetsov (V. Shipachev) – 46:28	4–1
	4–2	55:51 – (PP) T. Rolinek (P. Průcha, J. Marek)

14 min
Penalties
14 min
36
Shots
25

13 February 2011; 16:00	Sweden	3–2 GWS (0–1, 1–0, 1–1) (OT: 0–0) (SO: 1–0)	Finland	Ericsson Globe, Stockholm; Attendance: 9,359

Daniel Larsson
Goalies
Karri Rämö
Referees:
(Russia) Viktor Gashilov
(Russia) Alexey Ravodin

	0–1	08:23 – P. Kontiola
J. Ericsson (M. Thörnberg, B. Melin) – 27:57	1–1
	1–2	41:46 – L. Petrell (J. Niskala, J. Lajunen)
J. Sandström (N. Persson, M. Johansson) – 57:56	2–2

J. Lindström
Shootout

14 min
Penalties
14 min
22
Shots
41

== Scoring leaders ==
Pos	Player	Country	GP	G	A	Pts	+/−	PIM	POS
1	Dick Axelsson	Sweden	3	2	4	6	+4	2	FW
2	Magnus Johansson	Sweden	3	1	4	5	+4	4	DF
3	Martin Thörnberg	Sweden	3	2	2	4	+3	6	FW
4	Jonas Andersson	Sweden	3	1	3	4	+5	0	FW
5	Niklas Persson	Sweden	3	1	3	4	+1	0	FW

GP = Games played; G = Goals; A = Assists; Pts = Points; +/− = Plus/minus; PIM = Penalties in minutes; POS = Position
Source: Swehockey

== Goaltending leaders ==
Pos	Player	Country	TOI	GA	GAA	Sv%	SO
1	Stefan Liv	Sweden	119:48	3	1.50	94.55	0
2	Jakub Štěpánek	Czech Republic	120:00	10	5.00	85.71	0
3	Mikhail Biryukov	Russia	133:48	9	4.04	85.25	0
4	Karri Rämö	Finland	124:46	7	3.37	83.72	0

TOI = Time on ice (minutes:seconds); SA = Shots against; GA = Goals against; GAA = Goals Against Average; Sv% = Save percentage; SO = Shutouts
Source: Swehockey

== Tournament awards ==
The tournament directorate named the following players in the tournament 2011:

- Best goalkeeper: (Sweden) Stefan Liv
- Best defenceman: (Sweden) Magnus Johansson
- Best forward: (Russia) Maxim Rybin

Media All-Star Team:

- Goaltender: (Sweden) Stefan Liv
- Defence: (Sweden) Mattias Ekholm, (Sweden) Magnus Johansson
- Forwards: (Sweden) Dick Axelsson, (Sweden) Jonas Andersson, (Russia) Maxim Rybin
