= 2009 LG Hockey Games =

Tournament details
- Host countries: Sweden; Czech Republic
- Cities: Stockholm; Prague
- Venues: 2 (in 2 host cities)
- Dates: 5–8 February 2009
- Teams: 4

Final positions
- Champions: Sweden (10th title)
- Runners-up: Russia
- Third place: Finland
- Fourth place: Czech Republic

Tournament statistics
- Games played: 6
- Goals scored: 47 (7.83 per game)
- Attendance: 57,489 (9,582 per game)
- Scoring leader: (Russia) Maxim Rybin (4 points)

The 2009 LG Hockey Games was played between 5 and 8 February 2009 in Stockholm, Sweden. The Czech Republic, Finland, Sweden and Russia played a round-robin for a total of three games per team and six games in total. Five of the matches were played in the Stockholm Globe Arena in Stockholm, Sweden, and one match in the O2 Arena in Prague, Czech Republic. The tournament was part of 2008–09 Euro Hockey Tour.

The games were hosted in Globen, except one which was played in Prague, Czech Republic. Sweden won the tournament before Finland and Russia.

== Standings ==
Pos	Team	Pld	W	OTW	SOW	OTL	SOL	L	GF	GA	GD	Pts
1	Sweden	3	3	0	0	0	0	0	14	7	+7	9
2	Russia	3	1	0	1	0	0	1	14	11	+3	5
3	Finland	3	1	0	0	0	1	1	9	12	−3	4
4	Czech Republic	3	0	0	0	0	0	3	10	17	−7	0

Source: swehockey

== Games ==
All times are local. Stockholm – (Central European Time – UTC+1) Prague – (Central European Time – UTC+1)

5 February 2009; 18:00	Czech Republic	3-5 (1-1, 2-1, 0-3)	Finland	O2 Arena, Prague; Attendance: 16,324

Game reference

Miroslav Kopřiva
Goalies
Iiro Tarkki
Referees:
(Russia) Olenin Konstantin
(Russia) Alexei Ravodin
Linesmen:
(Czech Republic) Petr Blümel
(Czech Republic) Frantisek Kalivoda

05:54 – Petr Čajánek (Leoš Čermák)	1-0
	1-1	08:24 – Jukka Voutilainen (Jarkko Immonen, Teemu Laine) (PP)
20:18 – Radim Vrbata (Jaroslav Bednář)	2-1
	2-2	31:06 – Janne Niinimaa (Jukka Voutilainen, Jarkko Immonen)
33:30 – Petr Čajánek (Tomas Kurka, Angel Krstev)	3-2
	3-3	46:02 – Juha-Pekka Haataja (Antti Laaksonen, Tommi Santala)
	3-4	51:11 – Niko Kapanen (Mika Pyörälä, Mikko Lehtonen)
	3-5	54:52 – Mika Pyörälä (Niko Kapanen, Jukka Hentunen)

12 min
Penalties
14 min
32
Shots
34

5 February 2009; 19:30	Russia	3-4 (1-3, 1-0, 1-1)	Sweden	Stockholm Globe Arena, Stockholm; Attendance: 10,314

Game reference

Konstantin Barulin
Goalies
Johan Holmqvist
Referees:
(Finland) Tom Laaksonen
(Finland) Aleksi Rantala
Linesmen:
(Sweden) Jimmy Dahmén
(Sweden) Peter Lyth

	0-1	01:45 – Mathias Tjärnqvist (Magnus Johansson, Marcus Ragnarsson)
	0-2	00:00 – Daniel Widing (Johan Åkerman, Johan Davidsson) (PP)
11:01 – Aleksander Suglobov (PP)	1-2
	1-3	18:16 – Kenny Jönsson (Johan Åkerman, Johan Davidsson) (PP)
33:38 – Maxim Rybin (Petr Schastlivy)	2-3
	2-4	46:08 – Mattias Weinhandl (Tony Mårtensson, Linus Omark)
47:32 – Oleg Saprykin (Alexei Badyukov)	3-4

46 min
Penalties
22 min
22
Shots
34

7 February 2009; 12:00	Finland	4-5 GWS (0-0, 4-1, 0-3) (OT: 0–0) (SO: 0–1)	Russia	Stockholm Globe Arena, Stockholm; Attendance: 6,435

Game reference

Teemu Lassila
Goalies
Alexander Yeryomenko
Referees:
(Sweden) Tim Andersson
(Sweden) Patrik Sjöberg
Linesmen:
(Sweden) Leo Takula
(Sweden) Anders Ahlström

22:42 – Niko Kapanen (Jukka Hentunen, Janne Niinimaa) (PP)	1-0
23:49 – Leo Komarov (Riku Hahl	2-0
24:48 – Niko Kapanen	3-0
30:39 – Toni Koivisto	4-0
	4-1	37:01 – Maxim Rybin (Alexander Perezhogin)
	4-2	46:22 – Ivan Nepryaev (Oleg Kvasha, Alexei Emelin) (PP)
	4-3	46:46 – Petr Schastlivy (Aleksander Suglobov)
	4-4	58:54 – Dmitri Afanasenkov

Voutilainen (miss)
Pyörälä (miss)
Kapanen (miss)
Shootout
(miss) Afanasenkov
(miss) Radulov
Mikhnov
14 min
Penalties
8 min
44
Shots
36

7 February 2009; 15:30	Sweden	6-4 (2-1, 2-2, 2-1)	Czech Republic	Stockholm Globe Arena, Stockholm; Attendance: 10,422

Game reference

Stefan Liv
Goalies
Lukáš Mensator
Referees:
(Finland) Tuula Laaksonen
(Finland) Aleksi Rantala
Linesmen:
(Sweden) Daniel Winge
(Sweden) Tomas Källin

07:34 – Rickard Wallin (Marcus Ragnarsson, Niklas Nordgren)	1-0
	1-1	14:11 – Tomas Rolinek ([[]], [[]])
16:34 – Linus Omark (Tony Mårtensson, Mattias Weinhandl) (PP)	2-1
30:48 – Christian Berglund (Niklas Nordgren, Magnus Johansson)	3-1
	3-2	31:53 – Tomas Rolinek (Jan Marek, Jaroslav Bednar) (PP)
35:29 – Rickard Wallin (Niklas Nordgren)	4-2
	4-3	38:47 – Jan Marek (Petr Čajánek, Zbynek Irgl)
44:48 – Kenny Jönsson (Martin Thörnberg, Johan Davidsson) (PP)	5-3
	5-4	52:49 – Tomas Kurka (Petr Kumstat, Václav Skuhravý)
59:40 – Johan Harju (Marcus Nilson)	6-4

14 min
Penalties
14 min
31
Shots
28

8 February 2009; 12:00	Czech Republic	3-6 (2-2, 1-2, 0-2)	Russia	Stockholm Globe Arena, Stockholm; Attendance: 1,711

Game reference

Miroslav Kopřiva
Goalies
Konstantin Barulin
Referees:
(Sweden) Thomas Andersso
(Sweden) Christer Lärking
Linesmen:
(Sweden) Anders Ahlström
(Sweden) Daniel Winge

	0-1	02:29 – Maxim Rybin (Maxim Goncharov) (PP)
	0-2	06:41 – Petr Schastlivy (Aleksander Suglobov, Alexei Mikhnov) (PP)
10:21 – Ondřej Němec (Karel Rachůnek, Radim Vrbata) (PP)	1-2
11:03 – Jan Marek	2-2
	2-3	23:51 – Oleg Saprykin (Vitaly Vishnevskiy)
32:29 – Radim Vrbata (Jaroslav Hlinka, Jaroslav Bednář) (PP)	3-3
	3-4	39:51 – Alexander Perezhogin (Maxim Rybin, Andrei Taratukhin)
	3-5	44:55 – Oleg Saprykin (Aleksandr Radulov, Alexei Badyukov)
	3-6	52:59 – Alexei Mikhnov (Petr Schastlivy)

16 min
Penalties
22 min
38
Shots
23

8 February 2009; 15:30	Sweden	4-0 (0-0, 1-0, 3-0)	Finland	Stockholm Globe Arena, Stockholm; Attendance: 12,283

Game reference

Johan Holmqvist
Goalies
Iiro Tarkki
Referees:
(Czech Republic) Martin Homola
(Czech Republic) Antonín Jeřábek
Linesmen:
(Sweden) Peter Lyth
(Sweden) Fredrik Ulriksson

31:27 – Magnus Johansson (Tony Mårtensson, Mattias Weinhandl) (PP)	1-0
41:02 – Tony Mårtensson (Linus Omark, Mattias Weinhandl)	2-0
58:04 – Linus Omark (Johan Holmqvist	3-0
58:51 – Daniel Widing	4-0

20 min
Penalties
20 min
26
Shots
37

== Scoring leaders ==
Pos	Player	Country	GP	G	A	Pts	+/−	PIM	POS
1	Maxim Rybin	Russia	3	3	1	4	+3	2	LW
2	Niko Kapanen	Finland	3	3	1	4	+1	2	CE
3	Petr Schastlivy	Russia	3	2	2	4	+3	2	LW
4	Linus Omark	Sweden	3	2	2	4	+2	2	LW
5	Tony Mårtensson	Sweden	3	1	3	4	+1	0	RW

GP = Games played; G = Goals; A = Assists; Pts = Points; +/− = Plus/minus; PIM = Penalties in minutes; POS = Position
Source: swehockey

== Goaltending leaders ==
Pos	Player	Country	TOI	GA	GAA	Sv%	SO
1	Johan Holmqvist	Sweden	12:00	3	1.50	94.92	1
2	Konstantin Barulin	Russia	119:36	7	3.51	90.28	0
3	Iiro Tarkki	Finland	117:36	6	3.06	89.47	0
4	Miroslav Kopřiva	Czech Republic	12:00	11	5.50	80.70	0

TOI = Time on ice (minutes:seconds); SA = Shots against; GA = Goals against; GAA = Goals Against Average; Sv% = Save percentage; SO = Shutouts
Source: swehockey

== Tournament awards ==
The tournament directorate nominated the following players:

- Best goaltender: (Sweden) Johan Holmqvist
- Best defenceman: (Sweden) Kenny Jönsson
- Best forward: (Finland) Niko Kapanen

Media All-Star Team:

- Goaltender: (Sweden) Johan Holmqvist
- Defence: (Finland) Janne Niinimaa, (Sweden) Kenny Jönsson
- Forwards: (Russia) Maxim Rybin, (Finland) Niko Kapanen, (Sweden) Mattias Weinhandl
