= 2003 Česká pojišťovna Cup =

2003 Česká Pojišťovna Cup
Tournament details
- Host countries: Czech Republic; Finland
- Cities: Pardubice; Helsinki
- Venues: 2 (in 2 host cities)
- Dates: 4–7 September 2003
- Teams: 4

Final positions
- Champions: Finland (4th title)
- Runners-up: Sweden
- Third place: Russia
- Fourth place: Czech Republic

Tournament statistics
- Games played: 6
- Goals scored: 25 (4.17 per game)
- Attendance: 20,928 (3,488 per game)
- Scoring leader(s): (Finland) Toni Söderholm (Russia) Alexander Ovechkin (3 points)

The 2003 Česká Pojišťovna Cup was played between 4 and 7 September 2003. The Czech Republic, Finland, Sweden and Russia played a round-robin for a total of three games per team and six games in total. Five of the matches were played in Tipsport Arena in Liberec, Czech Republic, and one match in Hartwall Areena in Helsinki, Finland. The tournament was won by Finland. The tournament was part of 2003–04 Euro Hockey Tour.

== Standings ==
Pos	Team	Pld	W	OTW	OTL	L	GF	GA	GD	Pts
1	Finland	3	2	0	0	1	9	9	0	6
2	Sweden	3	1	1	0	1	5	4	+1	5
3	Russia	3	1	0	1	1	7	6	+1	4
4	Czech Republic	3	0	1	1	1	4	4	0	3

Source: swehockey

== Games ==
All times are local. Pardubice – (Central European Time – UTC+1) Helsinki – (Eastern European Time – UTC+2)

4 September 2003; 17:00	Russia	1-2 GWS (0-1, 0-0, 1-0) (OT: 0–0) (SO: 0–1)	Czech Republic	ČEZ Arena, Pardubice; Attendance: 4,500

Game reference
Maxim Sokolov	Goalies	Roman Málek
/ 0-1 / 07:11 – David Moravec (Josef Beránek); 58:46 – Maxim Sushinsky (Alexander Ovechkin) / 1-1
	Shootout	Blažek
8 min	Penalties	10 min
28	Shots	28

4 September 2003; 18:30	Finland	3-2 (2-0, 0-1, 1-1)	Sweden	Hartwall Areena, Helsinki; Attendance: 4,068

Game reference

Niklas Bäckström
Goalies
Henrik Lundqvist

05:16 – Tomi Kallio (Timo Pärssinen) (PP)	1-0
06:47 – Jukka Hentunen (Kari Kalto, Toni Söderholm) (SHG)	2-0
	2-1	35:31 – Niklas Nordgren (Magnus Kahnberg) (PP)
	2-2	41:54 – Johan Davidsson (Thomas Johansson) (SHG)
49:21 – Kimmo Rintanen	3-2

8 min
Penalties
12 min
27
Shots
24

6 September 2003; 13:00	Sweden	1-0 (0-0, 1-0, 0-0)	Russia	ČEZ Arena, Pardubice; Attendance: 1,500

Game reference
Daniel Henriksson	Goalies	Maxim Sokolov
34:04 – Daniel Rudslätt (Johan Davidsson) / 1-0
12 min	Penalties	6 min
19	Shots	23

6 September 2003; 17:00	Czech Republic	1-3 (0-2, 0-0, 1-1)	Finland	ČEZ Arena, Pardubice; Attendance: 4,700

Game reference

Roman Málek
Goalies
Teemu Lassila

	0-1	04:45 – Toni Söderholm (Jussi Jokinen, Arto Kuki)
	0-2	11:43 – Petri Pakaslahti (Antti-Jussi Niemi)
	0-3	45:31 – Tomi Kallio (PP)
57:35 – Petr Průcha (Jan Kolář, Petr Koukal)	1-3

10 min
Penalties
14 min
27
Shots
26

7 September 2003; 13:00	Finland	3-6 (1-4, 2-1, 0-1)	Russia	ČEZ Arena, Pardubice; Attendance: 1,400

Game reference

Niklas Bäckström
Goalies
Maxim Sokolov

	0-1	04:49 – Alexei Badyukov (Anton But)
	0-2	08:07 – Maxim Sushinsky (Alexander Ovechkin, Dmitri Bykov)
08:53 – Toni Söderholm (Pekka Saravo, Jaakko Uhlbäck)	1-2
	1-3	15:50 – Vitali Proshkin (Vladimir Antipov, Yuri Dobryshkin)
	1-4	16:53 – Alexei Badyukov (Anton But, Maxim Spiridonov)
27:43 – Tuukka Mäntylä (Marko Tuulola) (PP)	2-4

28 min
Penalties
30 min
26
Shots
35

7 September 2003; 17:00	Czech Republic	1-2 (0-1, 1-0, 0-0)	Sweden	ČEZ Arena, Pardubice; Attendance: 4,760

Game reference
Adam Svoboda	Goalies	Henrik Lundqvist
/ 0-1 / 01:20 – Niklas Anger (Daniel Rudslätt, Johnny Oduya); 31:48 – Petr Průcha (Petr Koukal, Jan Kolář) / 1-1
	Shootout	Jönsson
6 min	Penalties	14 min
28	Shots	22

== Scoring leaders ==
Pos	Player	Country	GP	G	A	Pts	+/−	PIM	POS
1	Toni Söderholm	Finland	3	2	1	3	+4	4	RD
2	Alexander Ovechkin	Russia	3	1	2	3	+3	4	RW
3	Alexei Badyukov	Russia	3	2	0	2	+2	2	RW
4	Maxim Sushinsky	Russia	3	2	0	2	+3	2	LW
5	Petr Průcha	Czech Republic	3	2	0	2	+2	2	RW

GP = Games played; G = Goals; A = Assists; Pts = Points; +/− = Plus/minus; PIM = Penalties in minutes; POS = Position
Source: swehockey

== Goaltending leaders ==
Pos	Player	Country	TOI	GA	GAA	Sv%	SO
1	Teemu Lassila	Finland	103:25	3	1.74	94.44	0
2	Henrik Lundqvist	Sweden	125:00	4	1.92	92.73	0
3	Maksim Sokolov	Russia	185:01	6	1.95	91.78	0
4	Roman Málek	Czech Republic	125:01	5	2.40	88.89	0
5	Niklas Bäckström	Finland	75:50	5	3.96	84.38	0

TOI = Time on ice (minutes:seconds); SA = Shots against; GA = Goals against; GAA = Goals Against Average; Sv% = Save percentage; SO = Shutouts
Source: swehockey

== Tournament awards ==
The tournament directorate named the following players in the tournament 2003:

- Best goalkeeper: (Sweden) Henrik Lundqvist
- Best defenceman: (Finland) Tuukka Mäntylä
- Best forward: (Czech Republic) Petr Průcha
