= 2004 Rosno Cup =

Tournament details
- Host country: Russia
- Venue: 1 (in 1 host city)
- Dates: 16–19 December 2004
- Teams: 4

Final positions
- Champions: Russia (8th title)
- Runners-up: Finland
- Third place: Czech Republic
- Fourth place: Sweden

Tournament statistics
- Games played: 6
- Goals scored: 28 (4.67 per game)
- Attendance: 26,400 (4,400 per game)
- Scoring leader: (Finland) Jussi Jokinen (6 points)

The 2004 Rosno Cup was played between 16 and 19 December 2004. The Czech Republic, Finland, Sweden and Russia played a round-robin for a total of three games per team and six games in total. All of the matches were played in the Luzhniki Palace of Sports in Moscow, Russia. Russia won the tournament. The tournament was part of the 2004–05 Euro Hockey Tour.

== Standings ==
Pos	Team	Pld	W	OTW	SOW	OTL	SOL	L	GF	GA	GD	Pts
1	Russia	3	3	0	0	0	0	0	7	2	+5	9
2	Finland	3	1	1	0	0	0	1	9	6	+3	5
3	Czech Republic	3	0	0	1	1	0	1	8	6	+2	3
4	Sweden	3	0	0	0	0	1	2	4	11	−7	1

Source: swehockey

== Games ==
All times are local. Moscow – (Moscow Time – UTC+4)

16 December 2004; 15:00	Czech Republic	4-3 GWS (2-1, 0-0, 1-2) (OT: 0–0) (SO: 1–0)	Sweden	Luzhniki Palace of Sports, Moscow; Attendance: 1,000

Game reference

Jiří Trvaj
Goalies
Johan Holmqvist
Referee:
(Russia) Sergei Karabanov
Linesmen:
(Russia) Konstantin Olenin
(Russia) Sergei Selyanin

Hemský (Vrbata) – 04:30	1-0
	1-1	06:53 – Jonsson
Rosa (Mikeska) – 09:15	2-1
Vašíček (Kaberle, Hořava) – 44:00	3-1
	3-2	46:21 – Lindström (Nordgren)
	3-3	47:15 – Berglund (Franzén, Ölvestad)

Vlasák
Vlasák
Vlasák
Shootout
Samuelsson
Samuelsson
(miss) Samuelsson
10 min
Penalties
8 min
23
Shots
30

16 December 2004; 19:00	Russia	2-1 (1-1, 1-0, 0-0)	Finland	Luzhniki Palace of Sports, Moscow; Attendance: 4,500

Game reference

Ilya Bryzgalov
Goalies
Fredrik Norrena
Referee:
(Sweden) Thomas Andersson
Linesmen:
(Russia) Aleksandr Kamurkin
(Russia) Aleksandr Lifanov

Kovalchuk (PP) – 03:16	1-0
	1-1	06:58 – Peltonen (Jokinen, Kukkonen)
Tyutin (Fedorov) – 38:56	2-1

6 min
Penalties
8 min
32
Shots
14

18 December 2004; 13:00	Sweden	1-4 (1-1, 0-1, 0-2)	Russia	Luzhniki Palace of Sports, Moscow; Attendance: 7,600

Game reference

Stefan Liv
Goalies
Maxim Sokolov
Referee:
(Finland) Jari Levonen

Hedström (Johansson, Hagos) – 05:48	1-0
	1-1	08:47 – Popov (Perezhogin)
	1-2	36:41 – Vishnevskiy (Datsyuk, Kovalev)
	1-3	56:50 – Semin (Tyutin)
	1-4	57:27 – Kovalev (Kovalchuk)

107 min
Penalties
113 min
17
Shots
19

18 December 2004; 17:00	Finland	5-4 OT (1-2, 0-2, 3-0) (OT: 1–0)	Czech Republic	Luzhniki Palace of Sports, Moscow; Attendance: 1,600

Game reference

Niklas Bäckström
Goalies
Marek Pinc
Referee:
(Russia) Igor Zakharov
Linesmen:
(Russia) Alexei Belov
(Russia) Vladislav Kiselyov

O.Jokinen (J.Jokinen) – 02:57	1-0
	1-1	05:16 – Vašíček (Vlasák, Martínek) (PP)
	1-2	17:09 – Nedorost (Hejda, Hemský)
	1-3	33:30 – Divíšek (Ptáček)
	1-4	36:53 – Hlinka (Vašíček)
Jokinen (Peltonen, Kapanen) – 52:17	2-4
Jokinen (Kukkonen) – 53:22	3-4
O.Jokinen (J.Jokinen, Peltonen) – 58:56	4-4
O.Jokinen (Niinimaa, J.Jokinen) – 60:51	5-4

6 min
Penalties
10 min
26
Shots
26

19 December 2004; 13:00	Russia	1-0 (0-0, 1-0, 0-0)	Czech Republic	Luzhniki Palace of Sports, Moscow; Attendance: 8,500

Game reference
Ilya Bryzgalov	Goalies	Jiří Trvaj	Referee: (Czech Republic) Thomas Andersson; Linesmen: (Russia) Aleksandr Kamurkin (Russia) Aleksandr Lifanov
Popov (Riazantsev, Perezhogin) – 37:42 / 1-0			Referee: (Czech Republic) Thomas Andersson; Linesmen: (Russia) Aleksandr Kamurkin (Russia) Aleksandr Lifanov
12 min	Penalties	14 min	Referee: (Czech Republic) Thomas Andersson; Linesmen: (Russia) Aleksandr Kamurkin (Russia) Aleksandr Lifanov
28	Shots	17	Referee: (Czech Republic) Thomas Andersson; Linesmen: (Russia) Aleksandr Kamurkin (Russia) Aleksandr Lifanov

19 December 2004; 17:00	Finland	3-0 (1-0, 0-0, 2-0)	Sweden	Luzhniki Palace of Sports, Moscow; Attendance: 3,200

Game reference

Fredrik Norrena
Goalies
Stefan Liv

Salmelainen (Kukkonen, Pirnes) – 04:39	1-0
Salmelainen (Niinimaa) (PP) – 48:36	2-0
Niinimaa (Norrena) (EN) – 59:52	3-0

16 min
Penalties
39 min
25
Shots
30

== Scoring leaders ==
Pos	Player	Country	GP	G	A	Pts	+/−	PIM	POS
1	Jussi Jokinen	Finland	3	2	4	6	+6	0	LW
2	Olli Jokinen	Finland	3	3	0	3	+5	2	CE
3	Josef Vašíček	Czech Republic	3	2	1	3	+2	4	CE
4	Ville Peltonen	Finland	3	1	2	3	+5	0	LW
5	Janne Niinimaa	Finland	3	1	2	3	+5	6	LD

GP = Games played; G = Goals; A = Assists; Pts = Points; +/− = Plus/minus; PIM = Penalties in minutes; POS = Position
Source: swehockey

== Goaltending leaders ==
Pos	Player	Country	TOI	GA	GAA	Sv%	SO
1	Ilya Bryzgalov	Russia	119:48	1	0.50	96.77	1
2	Fredrik Norrena	Finland	119:16	2	1.01	95.61	1
3	Jiří Trvaj	Czech Republic	125:00	4	1.92	93.10	0
4	Stefan Liv	Sweden	113:26	6	3.17	85.00	0

TOI = Time on ice (minutes:seconds); SA = Shots against; GA = Goals against; GAA = Goals Against Average; Sv% = Save percentage; SO = Shutouts
Source: swehockey

== Tournament awards ==
The tournament directorate named the following players in the tournament 2005:

- Best goalkeeper: (Finland) Fredrik Norrena
- Best defenceman: (Czech Republic) Tomáš Kaberle
- Best forward: (Russia) Pavel Datsyuk

Media All-Star Team:

- Goaltender: (Russia) Ilya Bryzgalov
- Defence: (Russia) Vitaly Vishnevskiy, (Sweden) Henrik Tallinder
- Forwards: (Russia) Ilya Kovalchuk, (Finland) Olli Jokinen, (Czech Republic) Tomáš Vlasák
