= Jan Kolář =

Jan Kolář may refer to:

- Jan Kolář (ice hockey, born 1981), Czech ice hockey player
- Jan Kolář (ice hockey, born 1986), Czech ice hockey player
- Ján Kollár (1793–1852), Slovak writer
