= William Nylander =

Swedish ice hockey player (born 1996)

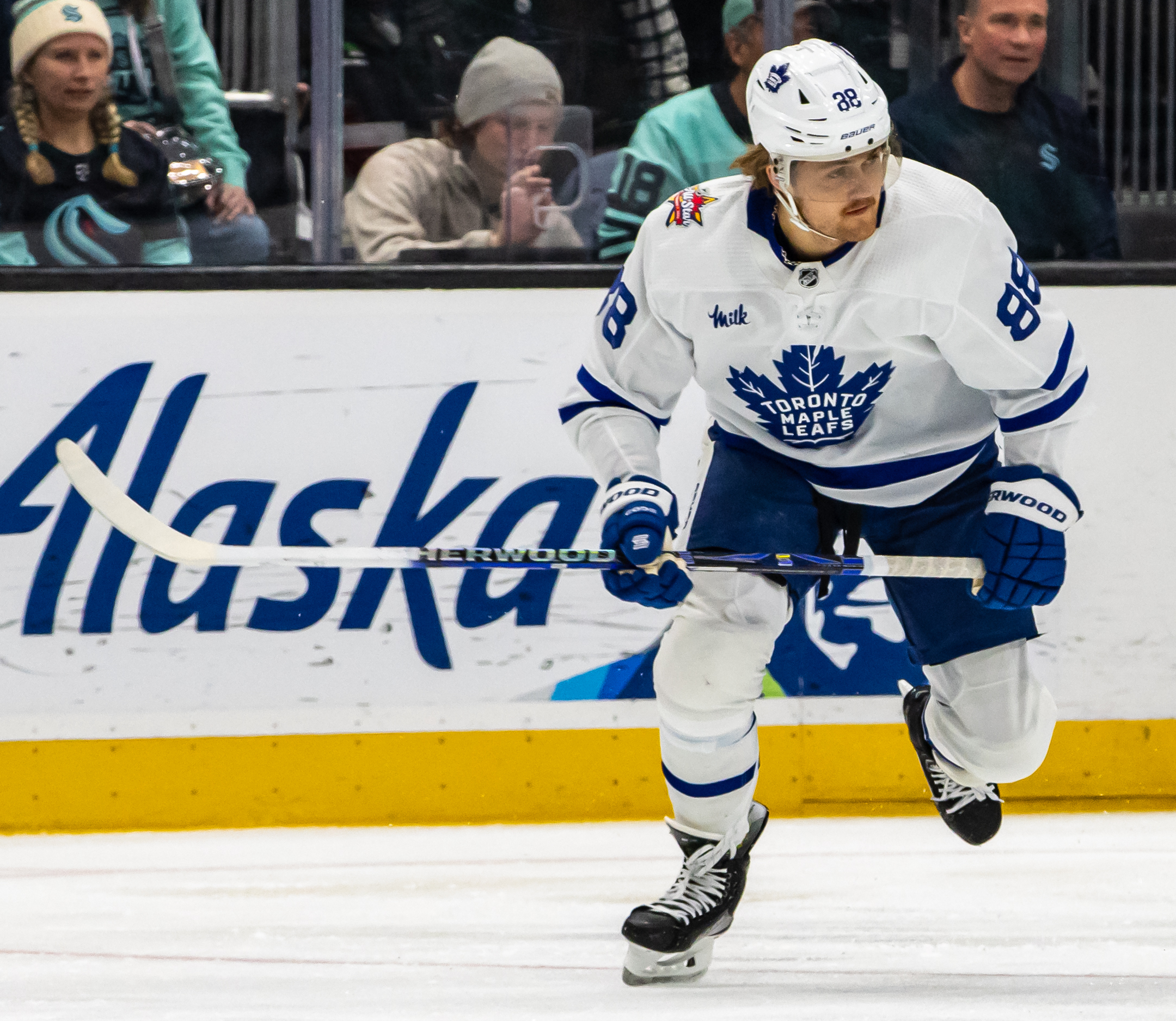
- Nylander with the Toronto Maple Leafs in 2024
- Born: 1 May 1996 (age 30) Calgary, Alberta, Canada
- Height: 6 ft 0 in (183 cm)
- Weight: 200 lb (91 kg; 14 st 4 lb)
- Position: Forward
- Shoots: Right
- NHL team Former teams: Toronto Maple Leafs; Modo Hockey
- National team: Sweden
- NHL draft: 8th overall, 2014; Toronto Maple Leafs
- Playing career: 2013–present

William Andrew Michael Junior Nylander Altelius (born 1 May 1996) is a Swedish professional ice hockey player who is a forward for the Toronto Maple Leafs of the National Hockey League (NHL). Nicknamed "Willy Styles", he is known for his offensive flair and speed.

The son of former NHL player Michael Nylander, William was born in Calgary while his father was playing for the Calgary Flames. William spent the majority of his youth in the United States as the family followed Michael's career to Tampa Bay, Chicago, Washington, Boston, and New York. At age 14, the family relocated to Sweden — his father's native country — where William developed his game with clubs including Södertälje SK and Rögle BK before breaking into the Swedish Hockey League (SHL) as a 17-year-old with MoDo Hockey.

Nylander was selected by the Maple Leafs in the first round, eighth overall, of the 2014 NHL entry draft. Born in Canada, Nylander represents Sweden internationally. In the 2017 World Championship, he won gold and was named the tournament's most valuable player (MVP).

== Playing career ==
As a youth, Nylander played in the 2009 Quebec International Pee-Wee Hockey Tournament with the New York Rangers minor ice hockey team.

On 14 February 2013, Nylander made his HockeyAllsvenskan debut. Playing alongside his father Michael Nylander with Södertälje SK, he earned an assist in his first professional game on a goal by Robert Carlsson. Nylander closed out his 2013–14 season with a successful 22-game rookie stint in the Swedish Hockey League (SHL), where he would play as many as 20 minutes per night. Ranked as a top prospect in the 2014 NHL entry draft, he was ultimately selected eighth overall by the Toronto Maple Leafs. Nylander was highly praised for his offensive talent and puck-moving abilities; however, criticisms were drawn to his defensive game and then-small stature, measuring 5 feet 9 inches (175 cm) tall and weighing 169 pounds (77 kg; 12 st 1 lb) at the draft combine.

=== Toronto Maple Leafs ===
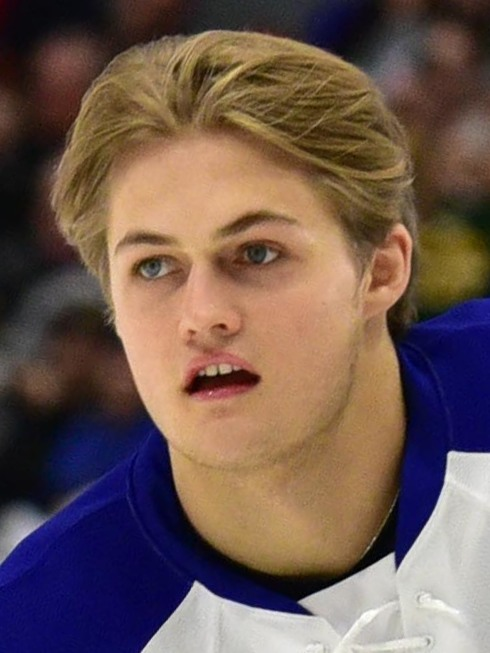
Nylander with the Toronto Marlies in 2016

After being drafted eighth overall, on 18 August 2014, Nylander was signed to a three-year, entry-level contract by the Maple Leafs. Nylander began the season playing with MoDo Hockey of the SHL, tallying eight goals and 12 assists in 21 games, but on 12 January 2015, he was reassigned to the Maple Leafs' American Hockey League (AHL) affiliate, the Toronto Marlies, to further his development. Nylander experienced a sensational campaign despite joining the AHL squad mid-season, scoring 32 points in 37 games playing on the right-wing. He was vital in helping the Marlies, who were at the bottom of the standings prior to Nylander joining, reach the 2015 Calder Cup playoffs. Although he left Modo Hockey after 21 games in the 2014–15 SHL season, Nylander was mentioned as a possible candidate for the SHL Rookie of the Year award.

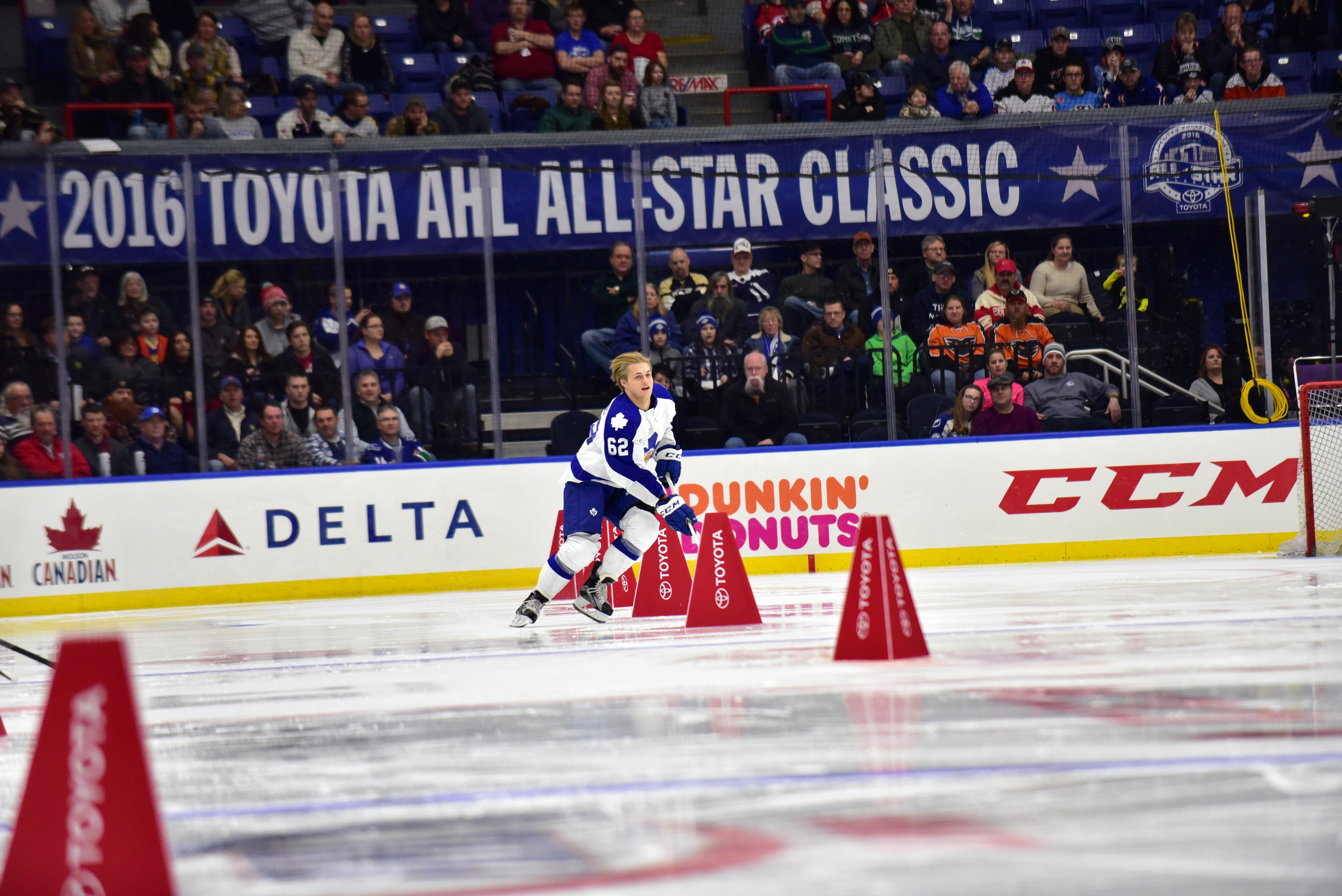
Nylander during the 2016 AHL All-Star skills competition

Nylander made his NHL debut on 29 February 2016, against the Tampa Bay Lightning at age 19. He scored his first goal on 5 March 2016, against Andrew Hammond of the Ottawa Senators. His first NHL goal was assisted by Brooks Laich, who also assisted William's father Michael on his last NHL goal.

The next season, Nylander made the Maple Leafs roster full-time. He debuted alongside Zach Hyman and Auston Matthews on 12 October 2016, in the season opener against the Ottawa Senators. Nylander quickly found chemistry with his linemates, helping Matthews set an NHL record for most goals scored in a rookie's debut with four by assisting on two of the goals. On 1 November, Nylander was named Rookie of the Month by the NHL for October. He had recorded 11 points in nine games, which was good enough for second in league scoring and first among rookie players. After his hot start in October, Nylander struggled in November, scoring only five points in 13 games. He had a nine-game goalless stretch between 27 October and 15 November. Nylander recovered, scoring twice in three games, but then went on another scoreless stretch between 22 November and 22 December, a span of 13 games. Nylander scored in back-to-back games to end the drought. He scored his first NHL career hat-trick on 4 February 2017, against the Boston Bruins. Nylander's 61 points helped the Maple Leafs qualify for the 2017 Stanley Cup playoffs, where they were eliminated in six games by the Washington Capitals.

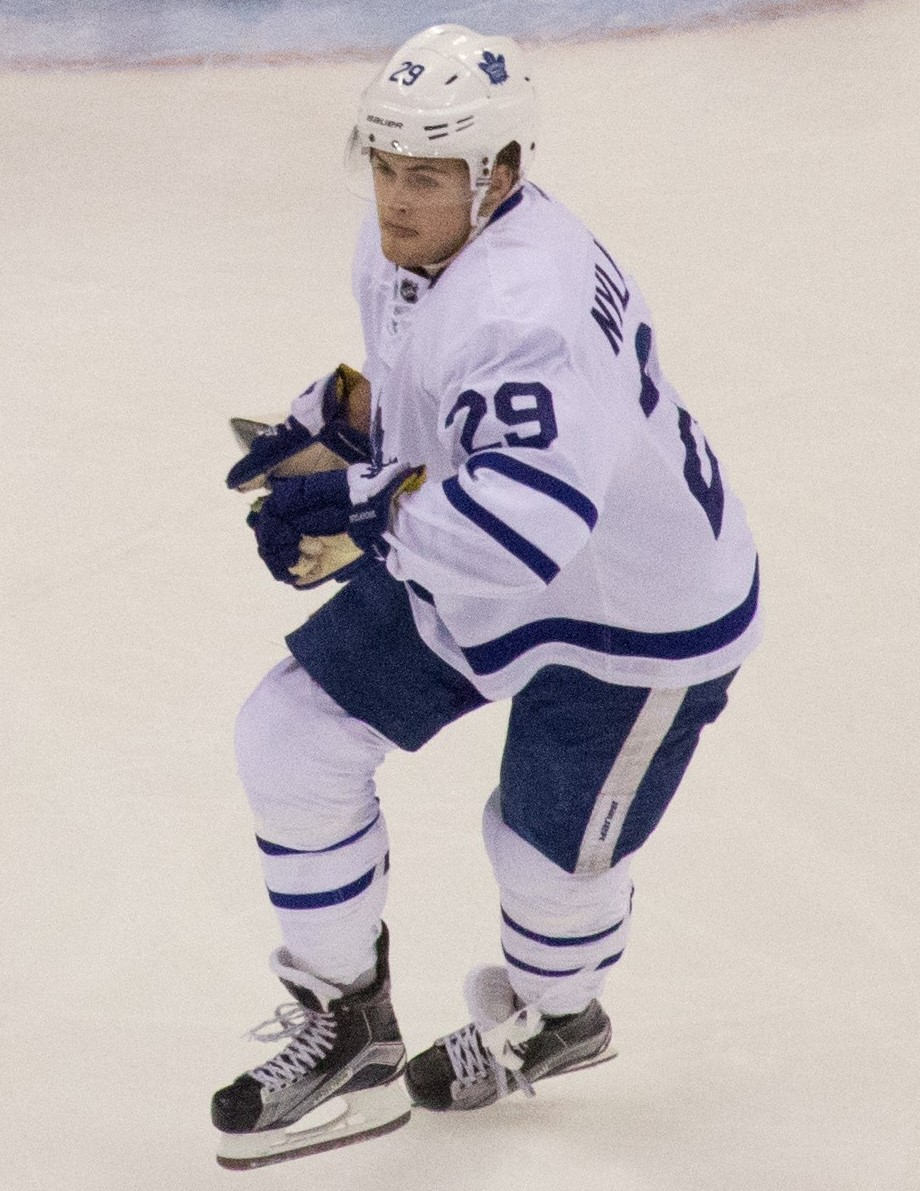
Nylander during the 2017 Stanley Cup playoffs

During the 2017–18 season, Nylander was again placed on the top line with Matthews and Hyman. Early in the season, Nylander went on an 11-game scoring drought, which ended in an overtime goal against the New Jersey Devils. By scoring that goal, Nylander became only the second player in franchise history (the first being Miroslav Fryčer) to score the only goal of a regular season game in overtime. He ended the regular season recording 61 points, the same as his rookie season. The Maple Leafs once again qualified for the playoffs, where they were eliminated in seven games of the first round by the Boston Bruins. He recorded one goal and three assists during those seven games.

Nylander became a restricted free agent during the off-season. He went unsigned throughout the summer, seeking a long-term extension as opposed to a "bridge deal". Nylander did not attend the team's training camp. The Maple Leafs began the season without Nylander, as the two sides could not come to an agreement beforehand. As a restricted free agent, Nylander needed to sign before 1 December to be eligible to play during the 2018–19 season. While away from the team, Nylander skated in Sweden and Austria. It was reported that he lost $30,000 in pay each day he remained unsigned. It was later reported on 10 November, that the Maple Leafs were fielding offers for Nylander, just weeks before the 1 December deadline. Just minutes before the deadline, Nylander agreed to a six-year, $45 million contract. Nylander was a healthy scratch for his first game back with the team, but made his season debut on 6 December, against the Detroit Red Wings. He would struggle for the remainder of that season, amassing 27 points in 54 games.

Ahead of the 2019-20 season, Nylander changed his jersey number from 29 to 88. He had originally chosen 29 because it was among the available numbers and was a reversal of his father’s number 92. 88 was also Nylander's number when he first turned professional in Sweden and was a nod to his admiration for Patrick Kane. He also agreed to cover the cost for fans to get their jerseys changed to the new number. Nylander's play markedly improved that year, especially following the Maple Leafs' decision to replace Mike Babcock as head coach with Sheldon Keefe. When the NHL was suspended due to the COVID-19 pandemic, Nylander had already set a career-high with 31 goals in 68 games, to go along with 28 assists.

During the pandemic-shortened 2020–21 season, Nylander continued to be a strong contributor for the Leafs in the regular season as he finished with 42 points in 51 games. He also led the team in goals and points during the playoffs, including a four-game goal streak in the first round against the Montreal Canadiens. His team however, was eliminated in 7 games after leading the series 3-1.

Over the next three seasons, Nylander elevated his play to an elite level, setting new career highs in each campaign and establishing himself as one of the league’s top forwards. He finished with his first 80 point season in the 2021-2022 NHL season when he scored 34 goals and 46 assists. The following year, he eclipsed his goal and point totals again with his first 40-goal campaign along with 87 points. He was also named as one of NHL's three stars for the week of December 5–11, 2022, his first time receiving the honour, with three goals and four assists over first three games while helping his team extend their point streak to 14 contests. He capped off that week with the first five-point game of his career (2 goals, 3 assists) in Toronto's 5-4 overtime win over the Calgary Flames. In the 2023–24 season, Nylander scored 27 points (12 goals and 15 assists) in the team's first 17 games, setting a new franchise record for longest point streak to start a season. During that streak, he would be named the NHL's third star of the week for the period ending on November 12, 2023, with 4 goals and 3 assists over four games. At the conclusion of his point streak, the Maple Leafs played two games in the 2023 NHL Global Series Sweden in his hometown of Stockholm. He scored one goal and two assists in a 3-2 win over the Detroit Red Wings in the opening game. In the second game, Nylander scored the overtime winner and added an assist in a 4-3 win over the Minnesota Wild. "It's pretty special to get the OT winner here," he said of the win. He concluded the trip with his second consecutive NHL Star of the Week honour, and one point behind the league scoring lead.

On 8 January 2024, after months of speculation, Nylander signed an eight-year, $92 million contract extension with the Maple Leafs. It was the largest contract in Maple Leafs history in terms of total value. He was later named to his first All-Star Game after leading all skaters in fan voting for the 2024 NHL All-Star Game. He was named the NHL's second star of the week for the week ending Dec 22, 2024. He scored in all three of his contests that week, producing 5 goals and 2 assists during that span. Nylander finished the season with his second straight 40-goal campaign and career highs of 58 assists and 98 points. In that year's playoffs, the Leafs were matched up with the Boston Bruins in the first round. However, Nylander was unexpectedly sidelined for the first three games of the series due to migraines so severe that team doctors had to test to verify he was not concussed. He was eventually cleared to play, returning in game 4, and later scored both goals in game 6 to secure a 2–1 victory. In the deciding game 7, he would score the game's opening goal in the third period, but the Bruins would tie shortly afterwards and win the game in overtime.

In the following 2024–25 season, Nylander set a new career high with 45 goals, finishing second in the entire league, along with 84 points. He scored his second career NHL hat-trick on 4 February 2025, against the Calgary Flames, eight years to the day after he scored his first hat-trick against the Boston Bruins. He led the team again in playoff goals and points, but the Leafs were eliminated in the second round that year by the eventual Stanley Cup champions, the Florida Panthers. That summer, he was named the winner of Guldpucken, awarded annually to the top Swedish ice hockey player, his first time receiving the honour.

During the 2025–26 season, Nylander became the Maple Leafs' all-time franchise leader in overtime goals with his 15th, scoring the game-winner on 26 November 2025, against the Columbus Blue Jackets. He surpassed fellow countryman Mats Sundin and teammate Auston Matthews. He finished the season with 79 points in 65 games, his fifth straight season over a point per game, but the Maple Leafs finished a disappointing 28th place in the league. It was the first time Nylander and the Leafs missed the playoffs since his rookie year.

In the 2026–27 season, Nylander recorded his second career five-point game by scoring 2 goals and 3 assists in a 6-3 win against the Colorado Avalanche on 10 October 2026. On 25 October, 2026, he recorded the 300th NHL goal of his career in a 7-2 win against the Edmonton Oilers. With his 300th career goal, he became the fourth fastest player in franchise history to reach the mark, the fourth fastest Swedish player in NHL history, and passed Rick Vaive for sixth all time in goals in Maple Leafs history. It also moved him into the top-ten leaders in multi-goal games in franchise history.

== International play ==
Medal record

Men's ice hockey

Representing Sweden

World Championships
Gold medal – first place	2017 Germany/France	
Bronze medal – third place	2025 Sweden/Denmark	

Despite being born in Canada, on 12 November 2012, the International Ice Hockey Federation (IIHF) ruled that Nylander was eligible to represent Sweden in international play. He went on to compete with Sweden under-18 team at the 2013 World U-17 Hockey Challenge, where he recorded a tournament-high eight assists, leading his team to a gold medal win. In the 2014 World U18 Championships, Nylander was a standout player of the tournament, winning the scoring race with 16 points in seven games. At the 2015 World Junior Championships, Nylander finished fifth in tournament scoring, the highest of any player not playing for Canada junior team.

Nylander made his senior team debut at the 2017 World Championship where his team won gold. He led the team in scoring with 14 points in 10 games and was named tournament MVP.

At the 2019 World Championship, Nylander led the tournament in scoring with 18 points in 8 games and was named to the tournament's all-star team despite his team being eliminated in the quarterfinals by Finland.

Before the 2024–25 NHL season, Nylander was announced as one of the first six players to play for Sweden at the 4 Nations Face-Off, and was subsequently named as one of the alternate captains of the team. He would finish the tournament with two assists.

In the 2025 off-season, Nylander was announced as one of the first six players of Sweden for the 2026 Winter Olympics.

== Personal life ==
Nylander was born in Calgary while his father, Michael, was playing for the Calgary Flames. He is a dual citizen of Sweden and Canada. He spent the majority of his youth in the United States where his father played for several NHL teams, spending the summers in Sweden. His family later moved to Sweden when he was 14.

Nylander has five siblings, including younger brother Alexander, who was selected eighth overall by the Buffalo Sabres in the 2016 NHL entry draft. On 24 November 2024, they became the fifth set of brothers to play a game together in Toronto Maple Leafs history.

In the 2025 off-season, he announced the launch of his YouTube channel.

== Career statistics ==
=== Regular season and playoffs ===
			Regular season					Playoffs
Season	Team	League	GP	G	A	Pts	PIM	GP	G	A	Pts	PIM
2011–12	Södertälje SK	J20	8	1	3	4	2	4	0	5	5	2
2012–13	Södertälje SK	J20	27	15	28	43	14	5	3	5	8	2
2012–13	Södertälje SK	Allsv	8	4	2	6	2	10	2	1	3	4
2013–14	Rögle BK	Allsv	18	4	4	8	10	—	—	—	—	—
2013–14	Södertälje SK	Allsv	17	11	8	19	6	—	—	—	—	—
2013–14	Modo Hockey	J20	3	0	3	3	4	5	3	5	8	2
2013–14	Modo Hockey	SHL	22	1	6	7	6	2	0	0	0	0
2014–15	Modo Hockey	SHL	21	8	12	20	6	—	—	—	—	—
2014–15	Toronto Marlies	AHL	37	14	18	32	4	5	0	3	3	0
2015–16	Toronto Marlies	AHL	38	18	27	45	10	14	7	4	11	2
2015–16	Toronto Maple Leafs	NHL	22	6	7	13	4	—	—	—	—	—
2016–17	Toronto Maple Leafs	NHL	81	22	39	61	32	6	1	3	4	2
2017–18	Toronto Maple Leafs	NHL	82	20	41	61	10	7	1	3	4	0
2018–19	Toronto Maple Leafs	NHL	54	7	20	27	16	7	1	2	3	2
2019–20	Toronto Maple Leafs	NHL	68	31	28	59	12	5	2	2	4	0
2020–21	Toronto Maple Leafs	NHL	51	17	25	42	16	7	5	3	8	4
2021–22	Toronto Maple Leafs	NHL	81	34	46	80	16	7	3	4	7	4
2022–23	Toronto Maple Leafs	NHL	82	40	47	87	28	11	4	6	10	2
2023–24	Toronto Maple Leafs	NHL	82	40	58	98	24	4	3	0	3	4
2024–25	Toronto Maple Leafs	NHL	82	45	39	84	26	13	6	9	15	4
2025–26	Toronto Maple Leafs	NHL	65	30	49	79	16	—	—	—	—	—
NHL totals			750	292	399	691	200	67	26	32	58	22

=== International ===
Year	Team	Event	Result	GP	G	A	Pts	PIM
2013	Sweden	U17	1st place, gold medalist(s)	6	2	8	10	2
2013	Sweden	U18	5th	5	2	1	3	2
2013	Sweden	IH18	7th	4	4	2	6	4
2014	Sweden	U18	4th	7	6	10	16	0
2015	Sweden	WJC	4th	7	3	7	10	0
2016	Sweden	WJC	4th	1	1	0	1	0
2017	Sweden	WC	1st place, gold medalist(s)	10	7	7	14	2
2019	Sweden	WC	5th	8	5	13	18	0
2022	Sweden	WC	6th	3	3	2	5	2
2025	Sweden	4NF	3rd	3	0	2	2	2
2025	Sweden	WC	3rd place, bronze medalist(s)	3	1	0	1	2
2026	Sweden	OG	7th	5	2	2	4	4
Junior totals				30	18	28	46	8
Senior totals				32	18	26	44	12

== Awards and honours ==
Awards	Year	Ref
AHL
AHL All-Star Classic	2016	
NHL
NHL Rookie of the Month	October 2016, March 2017	
NHL All-Star Game	2024	
International
IIHF World Championship MVP	2017	
IIHF World Championship media All-Star team	2019	
Guldpucken	2025	

Awards and achievements
Preceded by Frédérik Gauthier	Toronto Maple Leafs first-round draft pick 2014	Succeeded by Mitch Marner
