= Mikhail Biryukov (ice hockey) =

Russian ice hockey goaltender

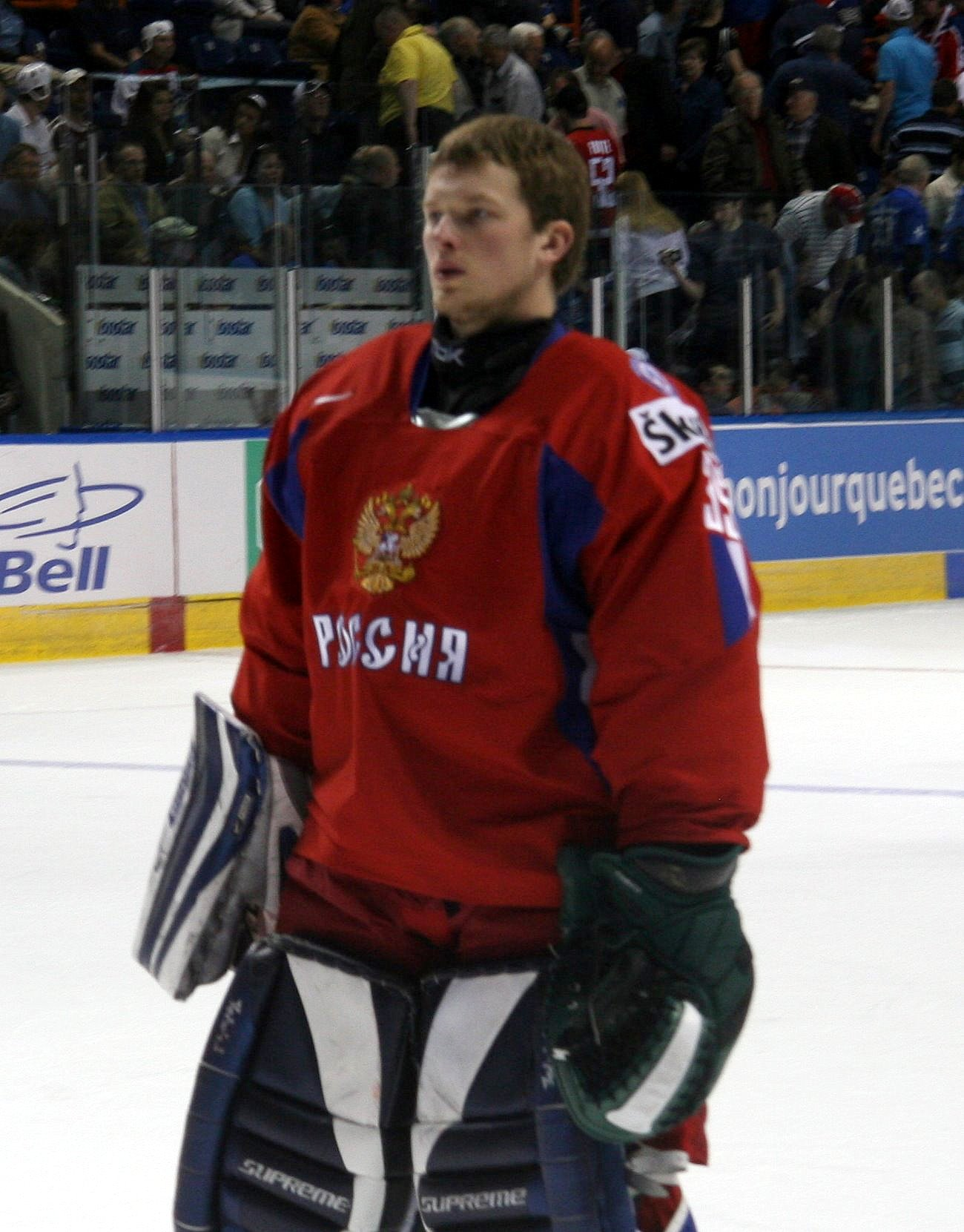
- Born: October 13, 1985 (age 40) Yaroslavl, Russian SFSR, Soviet Union
- Height: 6 ft 0 in (183 cm)
- Weight: 209 lb (95 kg; 14 st 13 lb)
- Position: Goaltender
- Catches: Left
- KHL team Former teams: Free Agent; HC MVD; HC Dynamo Moscow; HC Ugra; CSKA Moscow; Torpedo Nizhny Novgorod; Metallurg Novokuznetsk; HC Vityaz
- National team: Russia
- Playing career: 2005–present

Mikhail Olegovich Biryukov (born October 13, 1985) is a Russian professional ice hockey goaltender, who is currently an unrestricted free agent. He most recently played with HC Vityaz in the Kontinental Hockey League (KHL). He joined Vityaz after a second stint with Torpedo Nizhny Novgorod in the KHL.

Biryukov played for the Russia national ice hockey team for the 2007 IIHF World Championship.
