= František Ptáček =

Czech ice hockey player

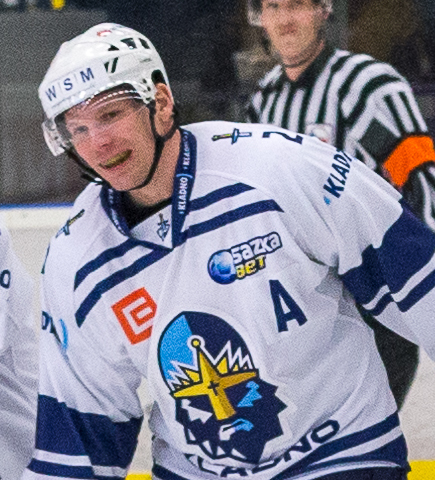
- Born: April 4, 1975 (age 51) Prague, Czechoslovakia
- Height: 5 ft 9.4 in (176 cm)
- Weight: 192 lb (87 kg; 13 st 10 lb)
- Position: Defence
- Shot: Right
- Played for: HC Sparta Praha; HC Karlovy Vary; HC České Budějovice; Mountfield HK; HC Kometa Brno; HC Kladno
- NHL draft: Undrafted
- Playing career: 1993–2018

František Ptáček (born April 4, 1975) is a former Czech professional ice hockey player who lastly played with HC Sparta Praha in the Czech Extraliga.

Ptacek previously played for HC Sparta Praha and HC Karlovy Vary.

== Career statistics ==
			Regular season					Playoffs
Season	Team	League	GP	G	A	Pts	PIM	GP	G	A	Pts	PIM
1990–91	HC Sparta Praha U18	Czechoslovakia U18	26	7	8	15	—	—	—	—	—	—
1992–93	HC Sparta Praha U20	Czechoslovakia U20	34	11	12	23	—	—	—	—	—	—
1993–94	HC Slavia Praha	Czech2	—	2	6	8	—	—	—	—	—	—
1993–94	HC Sparta Praha	Czech	3	0	0	0	0	6	1	1	2	0
1994–95	HC Sparta Praha	Czech	41	1	11	12	14	—	—	—	—	—
1995–96	HC Sparta Praha	Czech	40	1	4	5	20	11	0	2	2	4
1996–97	HC Sparta Praha	Czech	43	2	6	8	22	10	0	1	1	2
1997–98	HC Sparta Praha	Czech	51	4	10	14	16	11	0	3	3	2
1998–99	HC Sparta Praha	Czech	46	4	11	15	20	8	1	1	2	4
1999–00	HC Sparta Praha	Czech	51	5	14	19	6	9	0	2	2	2
2000–01	HC Sparta Praha	Czech	46	3	15	18	8	13	2	5	7	2
2001–02	HC Sparta Praha	Czech	51	9	13	22	16	13	2	2	4	4
2002–03	HC Sparta Praha	Czech	51	5	13	18	20	10	1	3	4	0
2003–04	HC Energie Karlovy Vary	Czech	52	8	15	23	6	—	—	—	—	—
2004–05	HC Energie Karlovy Vary	Czech	52	12	7	19	36	—	—	—	—	—
2005–06	HC Energie Karlovy Vary	Czech	33	4	6	10	20	—	—	—	—	—
2005–06	HC Sparta Praha	Czech	17	1	6	7	20	17	1	1	2	8
2006–07	HC Sparta Praha	Czech	52	5	4	9	52	16	1	4	5	16
2007–08	HC Sparta Praha	Czech	45	2	1	3	32	4	0	0	0	2
2008–09	HC Sparta Praha	Czech	40	2	5	7	36	—	—	—	—	—
2008–09	HC Mountfield	Czech	10	4	3	7	16	—	—	—	—	—
2009–10	HC Mountfield	Czech	49	7	13	20	38	5	1	2	3	0
2010–11	HC Mountfield	Czech	47	10	16	26	28	6	3	1	4	6
2011–12	HC Mountfield	Czech	52	5	10	15	18	5	1	1	2	10
2012–13	HC Mountfield	Czech	50	5	17	22	40	5	0	0	0	2
2013–14	Mountfield HK	Czech	47	1	9	10	32	5	0	2	2	2
2014–15	HC Kometa Brno	Czech	52	7	13	20	22	12	1	2	3	10
2015–16	HC Kometa Brno	Czech	5	0	1	1	4	—	—	—	—	—
2015–16	Rytíři Kladno	Czech2	37	3	11	14	20	6	0	1	1	2
2016–17	Rytíři Kladno	Czech2	50	4	14	18	32	11	0	1	1	2
2017–18	HC Sparta Praha	Czech	1	0	0	0	0	—	—	—	—	—
2018–19	HT Mníšek pod Brdy	Czech5	—	—	—	—	—	—	—	—	—	—
2019–20	HT Mníšek pod Brdy	Czech5	20	8	6	14	6	2	1	2	3	2
2020–21	HC Letci Letňany B	Czech5	2	0	0	0	0	—	—	—	—	—
2021–22	HC Letci Letňany B	Czech5	—	—	—	—	—	—	—	—	—	—
2022–23	HC Letci Letňany B	Czech5	8	3	3	6	6	—	—	—	—	—
Czech totals			1,027	107	223	330	542	166	15	33	48	76
