= Jiří Trvaj =

Czech ice hockey player

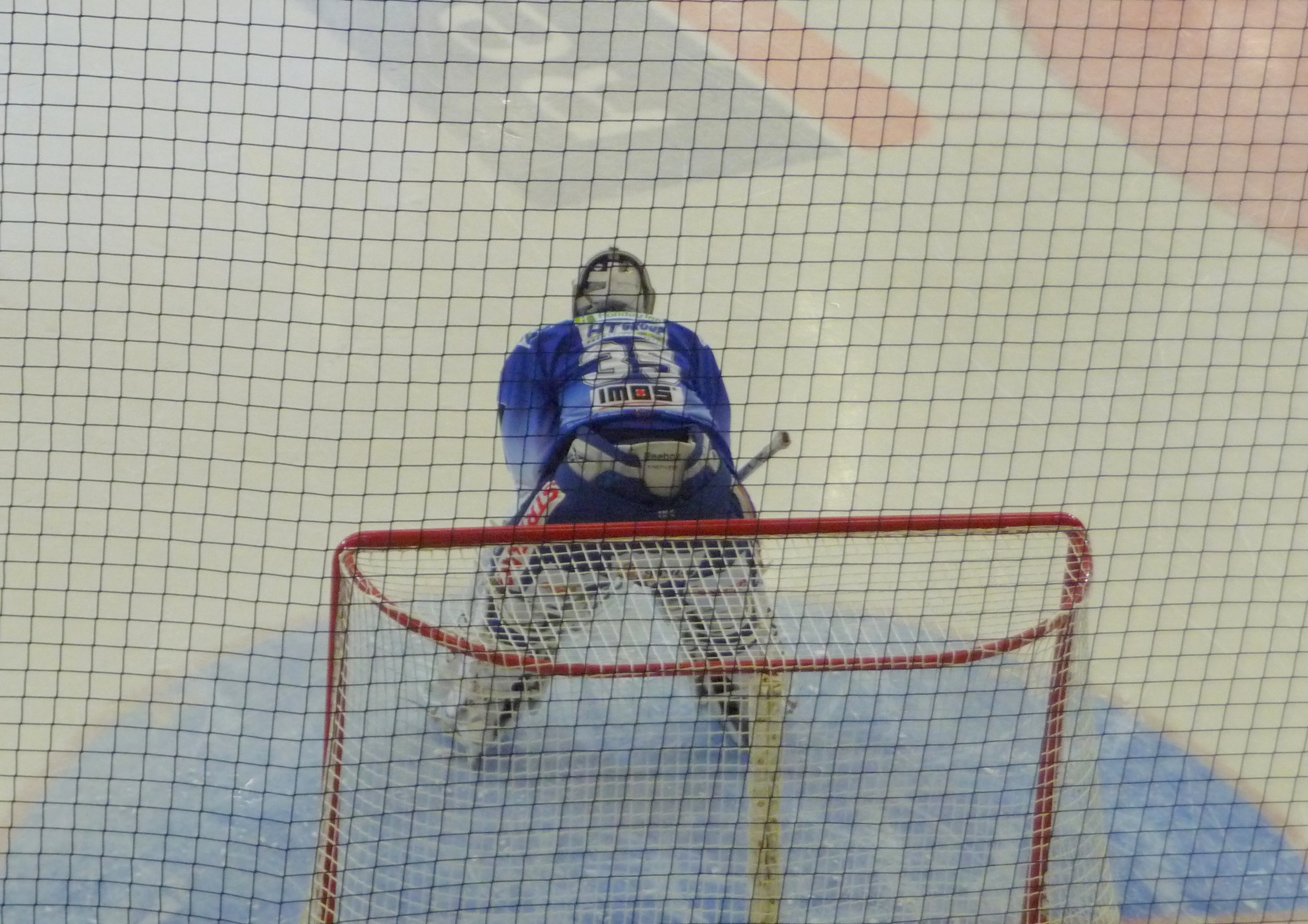
- Born: April 13, 1974 (age 50); Havířov, Czechoslovakia
- Height: 6 ft 0 in (183 cm)
- Weight: 176 lb (80 kg; 12 st 8 lb)
- Position: Goaltender
- Shoots: Left
- Czech Extraliga team: HC Olomouc
- NHL draft: Undrafted
- Playing career: 1997–present

Jiří Trvaj (born 13 April 1974) is a Czech professional ice hockey goaltender who currently plays with HC Olomouc in the Czech Extraliga.

Trvaj previously played for HC Kometa Brno, HC Havířov, HC Vítkovice, HC Slezan Opava, Lada Togliatti and HC Znojemští Orli.
