= Alexei Badyukov =

Russian professional ice hockey centre

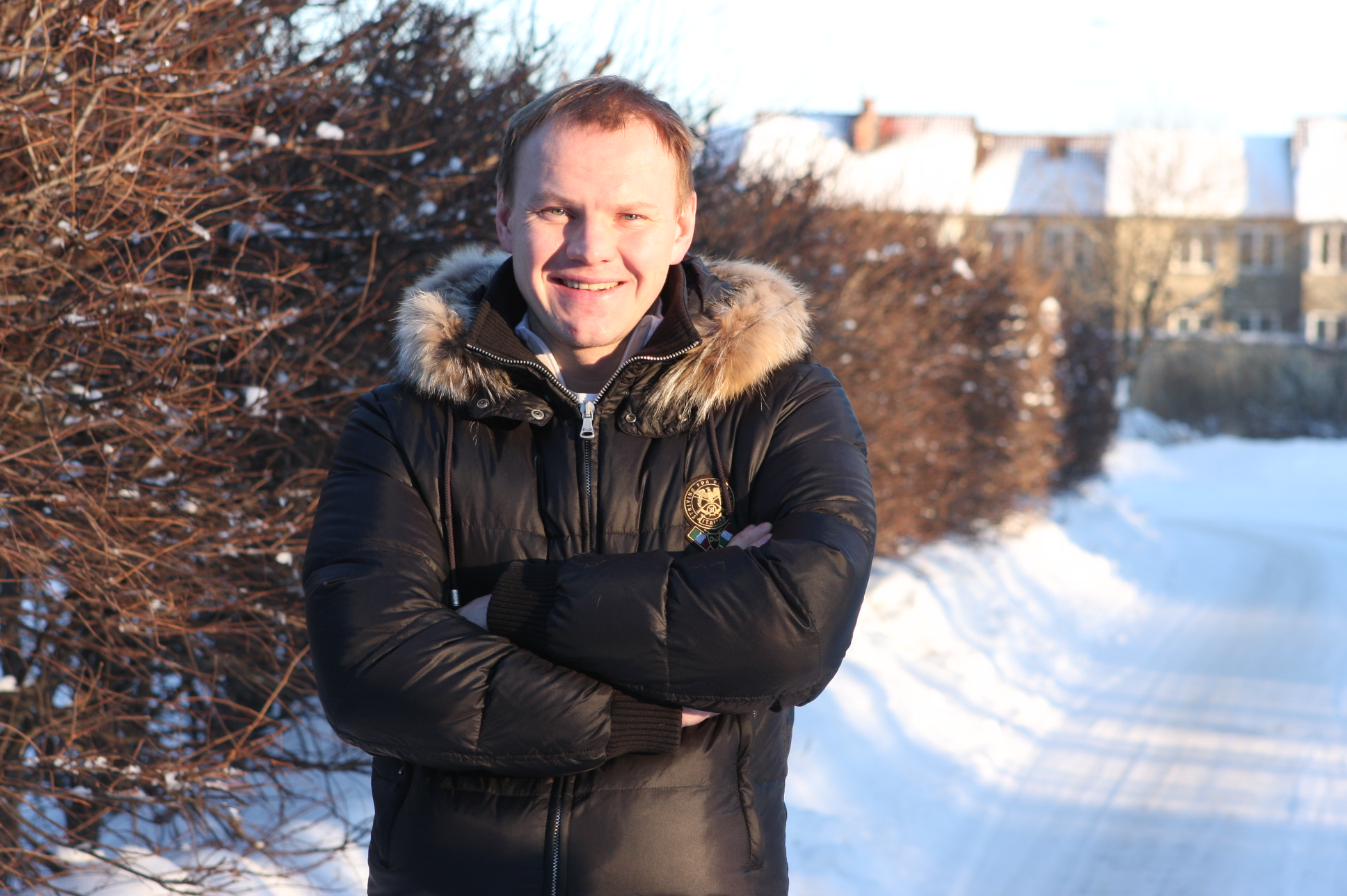
- Born: April 20, 1978 (age 47); Moscow, Russia
- Height: 6 ft 0 in (183 cm)
- Weight: 205 lb (93 kg; 14 st 9 lb)
- Position: Centre
- Shot: Right
- KHL team Former teams: HC CSKA Moscow; HC Dynamo Moscow; Dynamo Yekaterinburg; PHC Krylya Sovetov; Avangard Omsk; HC Amur Khabarovsk; Lokomotiv Yaroslavl; Severstal Cherepovets
- Coached for: HC Sochi
- National team: Russia
- NHL draft: Undrafted
- Playing career: 1996–2013
- Coaching career: 2018–2024

Alexei Badyukov (born April 20, 1978) is a retired Russian professional ice hockey centre who played for HC CSKA Moscow of the Kontinental Hockey League (KHL). Currently he is the Assistant Director of Hockey Operations for HC Sochi.

== Career statistics ==
| | | | Regular season | | | | | Playoffs |
| Season | Team | League | GP | G | A | Pts | PIM | GP | G | A | Pts | PIM |
|---|---|---|---|---|---|---|---|---|---|---|---|---|
| 1995–96 | HC Dynamo Moscow-2 | Russia2 | 30 | 5 | 1 | 6 | 6 | — | — | — | — | — |
| 1996–97 | HC Dynamo Moscow | Russia | 3 | 0 | 0 | 0 | 4 | — | — | — | — | — |
| 1996–97 | HC Dynamo Moscow-2 | Russia3 | 52 | 15 | 18 | 33 | 40 | — | — | — | — | — |
| 1997–98 | Dinamo-Energija Yekaterinburg | Russia | 14 | 3 | 0 | 3 | 2 | — | — | — | — | — |
| 1997–98 | HC Dynamo Moscow | Russia | 2 | 0 | 0 | 0 | 0 | 6 | 0 | 0 | 0 | 2 |
| 1997–98 | HC Dynamo Moscow-2 | Russia2 | 9 | 2 | 3 | 5 | 22 | — | — | — | — | — |
| 1998–99 | Krylya Sovetov Moscow | Russia | 25 | 2 | 2 | 4 | 24 | — | — | — | — | — |
| 1999–00 | Avangard Omsk | Russia | 35 | 7 | 3 | 10 | 12 | 8 | 1 | 1 | 2 | 10 |
| 1999–00 | Avangard-VDV Omsk | Russia3 | 3 | 0 | 3 | 3 | 0 | — | — | — | — | — |
| 2000–01 | Avangard Omsk | Russia | 25 | 5 | 1 | 6 | 18 | 11 | 1 | 3 | 4 | 4 |
| 2000–01 | Avangard-VDV Omsk | Russia3 | 4 | 0 | 1 | 1 | 0 | — | — | — | — | — |
| 2001–02 | Amur Khabarovsk | Russia | 40 | 6 | 5 | 11 | 16 | — | — | — | — | — |
| 2001–02 | Samorodok Khabarovsk | Russia3 | 2 | 1 | 1 | 2 | 0 | — | — | — | — | — |
| 2002–03 | Amur Khabarovsk | Russia | 41 | 11 | 19 | 30 | 14 | — | — | — | — | — |
| 2003–04 | Lokomotiv Yaroslavl | Russia | 51 | 2 | 8 | 10 | 16 | — | — | — | — | — |
| 2004–05 | Severstal Cherepovets | Russia | 50 | 5 | 10 | 15 | 20 | — | — | — | — | — |
| 2005–06 | Ak Bars Kazan | Russia | 49 | 5 | 14 | 19 | 38 | 13 | 0 | 2 | 2 | 4 |
| 2006–07 | Ak Bars Kazan | Russia | 51 | 14 | 14 | 28 | 14 | 16 | 2 | 3 | 5 | 6 |
| 2007–08 | HC Dynamo Moscow | Russia | 56 | 14 | 23 | 37 | 26 | 9 | 2 | 5 | 7 | 4 |
| 2008–09 | HC Dynamo Moscow | KHL | 27 | 6 | 14 | 20 | 26 | — | — | — | — | — |
| 2008–09 | Ak Bars Kazan | KHL | 20 | 2 | 5 | 7 | 14 | 18 | 1 | 4 | 5 | 6 |
| 2009–10 | Ak Bars Kazan | KHL | 50 | 9 | 6 | 15 | 34 | 22 | 2 | 5 | 7 | 4 |
| 2010–11 | HC CSKA Moscow | KHL | 48 | 10 | 17 | 27 | 28 | — | — | — | — | — |
| 2010–11 | Ak Bars Kazan | KHL | 4 | 0 | 0 | 0 | 2 | 6 | 0 | 0 | 0 | 4 |
| 2011–12 | HC CSKA Moscow | KHL | 53 | 6 | 12 | 18 | 24 | 5 | 0 | 1 | 1 | 2 |
| 2012–13 | Vityaz Chekhov | KHL | 50 | 9 | 12 | 21 | 14 | — | — | — | — | — |
| 2013–14 | Avangard Omsk | KHL | 18 | 0 | 2 | 2 | 10 | — | — | — | — | — |
| 2013–14 | Torpedo Nizhny Novgorod | KHL | 21 | 0 | 1 | 1 | 2 | 7 | 1 | 0 | 1 | 2 |
| KHL totals | | | 291 | 42 | 69 | 111 | 154 | 58 | 4 | 10 | 14 | 18 |
| Russia totals | | | 442 | 74 | 99 | 173 | 204 | 63 | 6 | 14 | 20 | 30 |
