= Tomáš Divíšek =

Czech ice hockey player

- Born: July 19, 1979 (age 46) Most, Czechoslovakia
- Height: 6 ft 2 in (188 cm)
- Weight: 204 lb (93 kg; 14 st 8 lb)
- Position: Right wing
- Shot: Left
- Played for: HC Pardubice; HC Slavia Praha; HC Plzeň; HC Kometa Brno; BK Mladá Boleslav; Piráti Chomutov; HC Sparta Praha; NHL; Philadelphia Flyers; AHL; Philadelphia Phantoms; Springfield Falcons
- National team: Czech Republic
- NHL draft: 195th overall, 1998; Philadelphia Flyers
- Playing career: 1997–2019

Tomáš Divíšek (born July 19, 1979) is a Czech former professional ice hockey right winger. He played five games in the National Hockey League (NHL) for the Philadelphia Flyers over parts of two seasons.

== Career statistics ==
			Regular season					Playoffs
Season	Team	League	GP	G	A	Pts	PIM	GP	G	A	Pts	PIM
1996–97	HC Slavia Praha	Czech	1	0	0	0	2	1	0	0	0	0
1997–98	HC Slavia Praha	Czech	22	2	0	2	6	—	—	—	—	—
1998–99	HC Slavia Praha	Czech	44	8	4	12	26	—	—	—	—	—
1999–00	Philadelphia Phantoms	AHL	59	18	31	49	30	5	0	3	3	2
2000–01	Philadelphia Flyers	NHL	2	0	0	0	0	—	—	—	—	—
2000–01	Philadelphia Phantoms	AHL	45	10	22	32	33	10	4	9	13	4
2001–02	Philadelphia Flyers	NHL	3	1	0	1	0	—	—	—	—	—
2001–02	Philadelphia Phantoms	AHL	65	13	18	31	54	—	—	—	—	—
2001–02	Springfield Falcons	AHL	9	2	1	3	8	—	—	—	—	—
2002–03	HC Pardubice	Czech	34	16	14	30	22	15	2	4	6	12
2002–03	HC Hradec Kralove	Czech2	1	2	0	2	10	—	—	—	—	—
2003–04	HC Pardubice	Czech	49	20	24	44	101	7	0	2	2	4
2004–05	HC Pardubice	Czech	35	13	6	19	40	16	1	5	6	6
2005–06	HC Slavia Praha	Czech	40	8	20	28	48	15	1	6	7	8
2006–07	HC Slavia Praha	Czech	8	2	4	6	18	—	—	—	—	—
2006–07	HC Plzen	Czech	34	15	18	33	96	—	—	—	—	—
2006–07	EHC Basel	NLA	—	—	—	—	—	13	4	6	10	18
2007–08	HC Plzen	Czech	52	21	14	35	133	3	0	2	2	6
2008–09	HC Pardubice	Czech	47	13	21	34	50	7	3	4	7	10
2009–10	HC Pardubice	Czech	20	2	8	10	20	—	—	—	—	—
2009–10	HC Kometa Brno	Czech	18	2	4	6	24	10	4	2	6	2
2010–11	BK Mlada Boleslav	Czech	48	16	13	29	28	8	5	4	9	18
2011–12	HC Davos	NLA	7	3	2	5	4	—	—	—	—	—
2011–12	HC Kometa Brno	Czech	26	6	11	17	18	20	6	20	26	16
2012–13	HC Kometa Brno	Czech	28	12	15	27	32	—	—	—	—	—
2012–13	Pirati Chomutov	Czech	9	3	7	10	12	6	0	0	0	0
2013–14	Pirati Chomutov	Czech	32	6	10	16	32	—	—	—	—	—
2013–14	HC Sparta Praha	Czech	6	0	1	1	6	4	1	2	3	0
2014–15	HC Most	Czech2	11	1	9	10	10	—	—	—	—	—
2014–15	HC Plzen	Czech	8	3	1	4	2	—	—	—	—	—
2014–15	HC Slavia Praha	Czech	21	6	9	15	24	—	—	—	—	—
2015–16	HC Pardubice	Czech	6	1	2	3	4	—	—	—	—	—
2015–16	HC Most	Czech2	8	2	5	7	4	—	—	—	—	—
2015–16	Blue Devils Weiden	Germany3	12	5	10	15	8	7	3	4	7	2
NHL totals			5	1	0	1	0	—	—	—	—	—
AHL totals			178	43	72	115	125	15	4	12	16	6
Czech totals			588	175	206	381	744	112	23	51	74	82
