= Maxim Rybin =

Russian ice hockey player (born 1981)

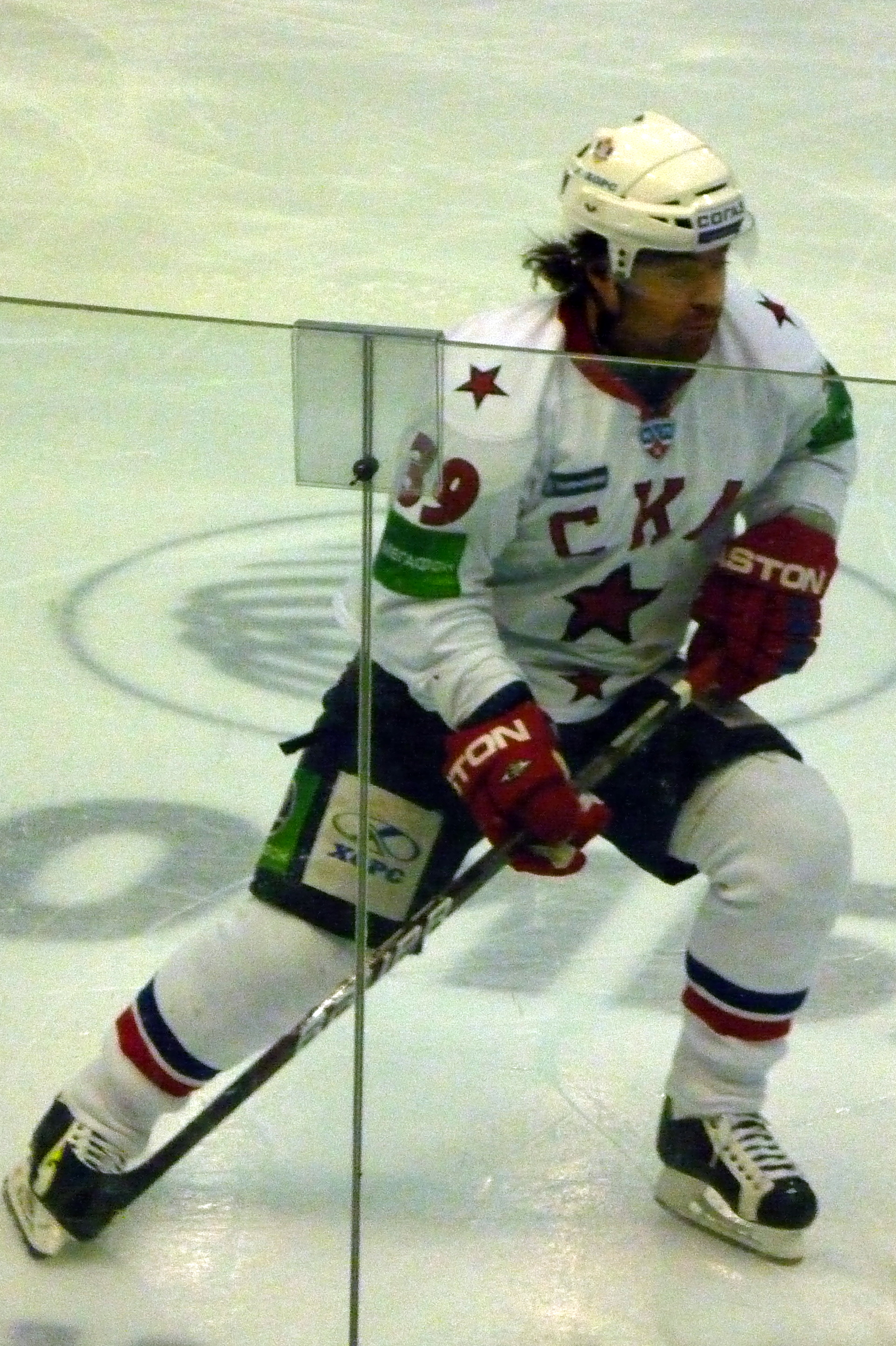
- Rybin in 2010
- Born: June 15, 1981 (age 44) Zhukovsky, Moscow Oblast, Russian SFSR
- Height: 5 ft 9 in (175 cm)
- Weight: 207 lb (94 kg; 14 st 11 lb)
- Position: Left wing
- Shot: Right
- Played for: Spartak Moscow; Salavat Yulaev Ufa; Severstal Cherepovets; Avangard Omsk; Metallurg Novokuznetsk; SKA Saint Petersburg; HC Vityaz; Neftekhimik Nizhnekamsk; Lada Togliatti
- NHL draft: 141st overall, 1999; Mighty Ducks of Anaheim
- Playing career: 1997–2019

Maxim Vyacheslavovich Rybin (Russian: Максим Вячеславович Рыбин; born June 15, 1981) is a Russian former ice hockey winger. He last played for Salavat Yulaev Ufa of the Kontinental Hockey League (KHL).

Rybin was selected by the Mighty Ducks of Anaheim in the 5th round (141st overall) of the 1999 NHL entry draft and played two junior seasons in North America with the Sarnia Sting of the Ontario Hockey League before returning to play the entirety of his professional career in Russia.
