= Magnus Johansson (ice hockey) =

Swedish ice hockey player (born 1973)

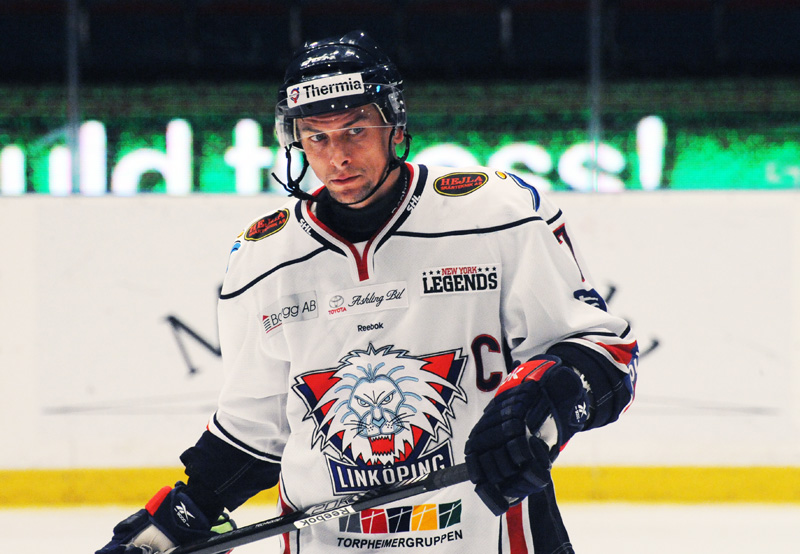
- Magnus Johansson playing for Linköpings HC during an away game in the Swedish Hockey League against AIK in December 2013
- Born: 4 September 1973 (age 53) Linköping, Sweden
- Height: 5 ft 11 in (180 cm)
- Weight: 180 lb (82 kg; 12 st 12 lb)
- Position: Defence
- Shot: Right
- Played for: Linköpings HC; Frölunda HC; SCL Tigers; Chicago Blackhawks; Florida Panthers; Atlant Moscow Oblast
- National team: Sweden
- NHL draft: Undrafted
- Playing career: 1990–2015

Magnus "Mange" Johansson (born 4 September 1973) is a Swedish former professional ice hockey player. He was a defenceman and captain for Linköpings HC in the highest Swedish league, Elitserien, and is a former member of the Chicago Blackhawks and Florida Panthers of the National Hockey League (NHL) and Atlant Moscow Oblast of the Kontinental Hockey League (KHL).

== Playing career ==
Johansson started his senior playing career in his hometown team Linköpings HC in 1990. The club was then playing in Division 1 Södra, at the time one of Sweden's 2nd tier leagues, and Johansson who was appointed captain at an age of 18 would spend his first seven seasons there. In the 1996–97 season Linköpings HC was coached by Tommy Boustedt, and when his contract ended and he signed with the Elitserien team Västra Frölunda HC, he brought Johansson with him. Despite his relatively small stature Johansson adapted well to professional hockey, and over the following six seasons he developed into one of the league's most productive defencemen. After winning the Swedish championship with Västra Frölunda in 2003, Johansson signed a one-year contract with SCL Tigers of the Swiss Nationalliga A.

In March 2004, Linköpings HC, now in Elitserien, announced that Johansson had signed a 4-year contract and would make his, by the fans, long-awaited return to the club. Once again wearing the captain's C, he led his team to results never accomplished before in the club's history in the following three seasons; a second spot in the league in 2004–05, to the playoff semifinals in 2006 and to the finals in 2007.

In June 2007 Johansson agreed a one-year contract with NHL side, the Chicago Blackhawks. He played half the season with the Hawks that year before being traded to the Florida Panthers for a draft pick.

On 24 July 2008, he signed a contract with Atlant Mytishchi of the Kontinental Hockey League. In April 2009, Johansson returned to Linköpings HC and was again chosen as the team's captain.

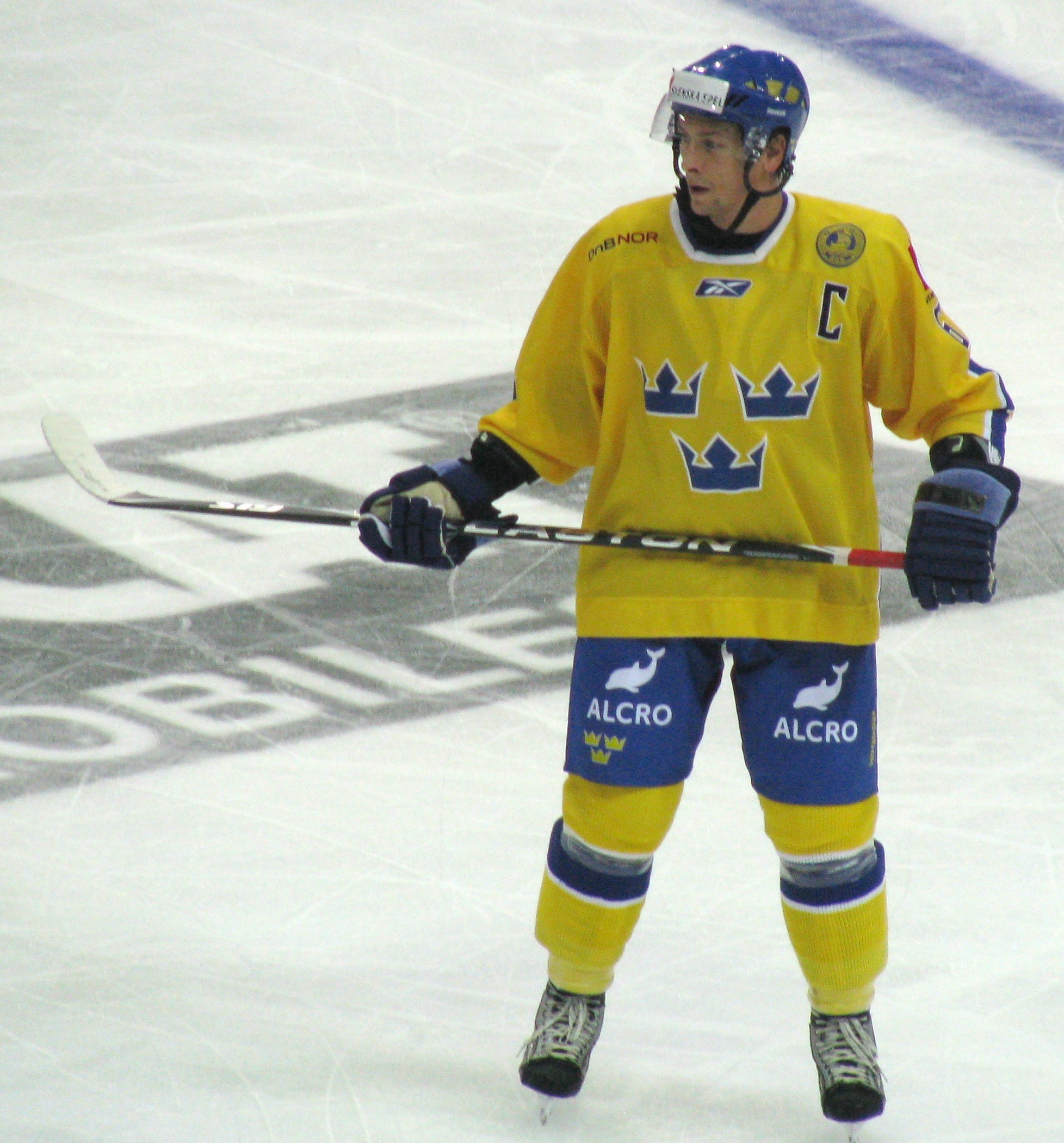

Medal record

Representing Sweden

Ice hockey

World Championships
Gold medal – first place	2006 Riga	
Silver medal – second place	2003 Helsinki	
Bronze medal – third place	2002 Gothenburg	
Bronze medal – third place	2009 Kloten	
Bronze medal – third place	2010 Cologne	

On 17 September 2011, Johansson scored his 394th point in Elitserien. This made him the highest scoring defenceman in Elitserien history. He had already made the most assists as a defenceman in Elitserien history during the previous 2010–11 season.

Following the 2014-15 season, Johansson announced his retirement after 25 professional seasons.

== International play ==
From 5–21 May 2006, Johansson was an alternate captain on the Swedish team that won the gold medals at the 2006 World Championships and on 13 May 2007 in the bronze medal game of the 2007 World Championships, which Sweden lost to Russia.

== Records ==
- Frölunda HC club record for points in a regular season, defenceman (35), 2001–02, 50-game schedule
- Linköpings HC club record for points in a regular season, defenceman (49), 2009–10, 55-game schedule
- Linköpings HC club record for goals in a regular season, defenceman (11), 2005–06, 50-game schedule
- Linköpings HC club record for assists in a regular season, defenceman (41), 2009–10, 55-game schedule
- Linköpings HC club record for goals in a playoff season, defenceman (6), 2009–10

== Career statistics ==
=== Regular season and playoffs ===
			Regular season					Playoffs
Season	Team	League	GP	G	A	Pts	PIM	GP	G	A	Pts	PIM
1990–91	Linköping HC	SWE.2	14	1	1	2	2	—	—	—	—	—
1991–92	Linköping HC	SWE.3	36	9	3	12	18	—	—	—	—	—
1992–93	Linköping HC	SWE.3	29	6	17	23	20	—	—	—	—	—
1993–94	Linköping HC	SWE.2	32	7	20	27	20	—	—	—	—	—
1994–95	Linköping HC	SWE.2	32	7	13	20	16	—	—	—	—	—
1995–96	Linköping HC	SWE.2	32	3	15	18	12	4	1	3	4	4
1996–97	Linköping HC	SWE.2	32	2	15	17	16	14	1	6	7	8
1997–98	Västra Frölunda HC	SEL	46	5	8	13	24	7	2	1	3	8
1998–99	Västra Frölunda HC	SEL	48	10	9	19	34	4	0	1	1	4
1999–2000	Västra Frölunda HC	SEL	49	12	22	34	26	5	0	1	1	2
2000–01	Västra Frölunda HC	SEL	50	6	28	34	26	5	2	1	3	14
2001–02	Västra Frölunda HC	SEL	48	14	21	35	36	10	1	5	6	8
2002–03	Västra Frölunda HC	SEL	50	11	15	26	14	16	2	3	5	20
2003–04	SC Langnau	NLA	48	4	21	25	36	—	—	—	—	—
2004–05	Linköping HC	SEL	47	9	25	34	26	6	3	0	3	0
2005–06	Linköping HC	SEL	50	11	11	22	30	13	2	1	3	10
2006–07	Linköping HC	SEL	52	8	28	36	46	15	4	3	7	6
2007–08	Chicago Blackhawks	NHL	18	0	4	4	4	—	—	—	—	—
2007–08	Florida Panthers	NHL	27	0	10	10	14	—	—	—	—	—
2008–09	Atlant Moscow Oblast	KHL	53	7	27	34	36	4	0	0	0	4
2009–10	Linköping HC	SEL	52	8	41	49	14	12	6	4	10	6
2010–11	Linköping HC	SEL	55	7	31	38	14	7	1	6	7	0
2011–12	Linköping HC	SEL	55	6	23	29	16	—	—	—	—	—
2012–13	Linköping HC	SEL	55	3	25	28	12	10	3	5	8	4
2013–14	Linköping HC	SHL	49	7	28	35	12	13	0	4	4	0
2014–15	Linköping HC	SHL	48	4	11	15	10	11	0	1	1	6
SWE.2 totals			142	20	64	84	66	18	2	9	11	12
SEL/SHL totals			754	121	326	447	334	134	26	36	62	88

=== International ===
Year	Team	Event	Result	GP	G	A	Pts	PIM
2002	Sweden	WC	3rd place, bronze medalist(s)	9	1	0	1	6
2003	Sweden	WC	2nd place, silver medalist(s)	9	0	0	0	6
2005	Sweden	WC	4th	9	1	4	5	2
2006	Sweden	WC	1st place, gold medalist(s)	9	2	3	5	2
2007	Sweden	WC	4th	8	3	0	3	2
2008	Sweden	WC	4th	9	1	2	3	8
2009	Sweden	WC	3rd place, bronze medalist(s)	9	3	5	8	6
2010	Sweden	OG	5th	4	0	2	2	2
2010	Sweden	WC	3rd place, bronze medalist(s)	9	0	4	4	6
Senior totals				75	11	20	31	40

Awards and achievements
Preceded by Jonas Gustavsson	Golden Puck; 2010	Succeeded by Viktor Fasth
