= Robert Carlsson (ice hockey, born 1977) =

Swedish professional ice hockey player

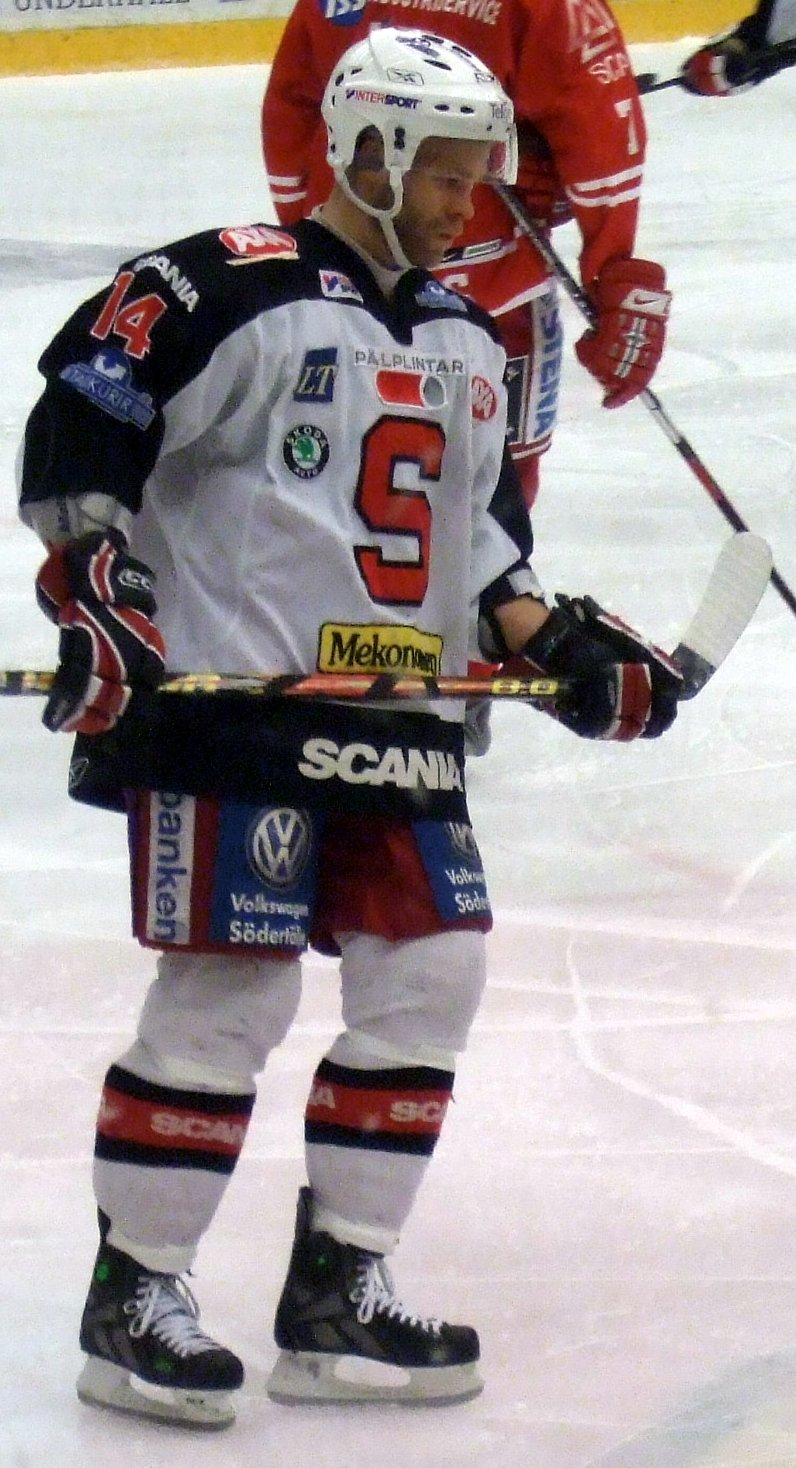
- Born: September 29, 1977 (age 48) Södertälje, SWE
- Height: 5 ft 9 in (175 cm)
- Weight: 182 lb (83 kg; 13 st 0 lb)
- Position: Left wing
- Shoots: Left
- HA team: Södertälje SK
- Playing career: 1996–present

Robert Carlsson (born September 29, 1977) is a Swedish professional ice hockey player. He is currently with the Södertälje SK team in the Swedish HockeyAllsvenskan league.

With the exception of an 18-game loan to Nyköpings Hockey in 1998 and the 2011–12 season played with the Malmö Redhawks, Carlsson has spent his entire career with Södertälje SK, including 463 regular season games played in the Swedish Elitserien.

== Career statistics ==
			Regular season					Playoffs
Season	Team	League	GP	G	A	Pts	PIM	GP	G	A	Pts	PIM
1994–95	Södertälje SK J20	J20 Superelit	26	4	8	12	30	—	—	—	—	—
1995–96	Södertälje SK J20	J20 Superelit	30	12	19	31	40	—	—	—	—	—
1996–97	Södertälje SK	J20 Superelit	29	18	27	45	—	—	—	—	—	—
1996–97	Södertälje SK	Elitserien	9	0	1	1	0	—	—	—	—	—
1997–98	Södertälje SK	Elitserien	6	0	0	0	2	—	—	—	—	—
1997–98	IK Nyköpings NH 90	Division 1	18	5	8	13	8	—	—	—	—	—
1998–99	Södertälje SK	Division 1	42	9	19	28	83	9	0	2	2	43
1999–00	Södertälje SK	HockeyAllsvenskan	46	13	14	27	86	10	1	1	2	4
2000–01	Södertälje SK	HockeyAllsvenskan	40	13	25	38	57	10	0	5	5	4
2001–02	Södertälje SK	Elitserien	50	4	6	10	30	—	—	—	—	—
2002–03	Södertälje SK	Elitserien	41	2	4	6	30	—	—	—	—	—
2003–04	Södertälje SK J20	J20 Superelit	1	0	2	2	0	—	—	—	—	—
2003–04	Södertälje SK	Elitserien	50	8	9	17	28	—	—	—	—	—
2004–05	Södertälje SK	Elitserien	48	6	11	17	90	10	1	0	1	27
2005–06	Södertälje SK	Elitserien	50	4	7	11	42	—	—	—	—	—
2006–07	Södertälje SK	HockeyAllsvenskan	45	20	30	50	60	10	5	4	9	14
2007–08	Södertälje SK	Elitserien	55	8	11	19	66	—	—	—	—	—
2008–09	Södertälje SK	Elitserien	53	7	14	21	34	—	—	—	—	—
2009–10	Södertälje SK	Elitserien	55	13	10	23	44	—	—	—	—	—
2010–11	Södertälje SK	Elitserien	46	11	11	22	14	—	—	—	—	—
2011–12	Malmö Redhawks	HockeyAllsvenksan	49	16	19	35	66	6	3	3	6	4
2012–13	Södertälje SK	HockeyAllsvenskan	47	10	18	28	24	8	0	1	1	0
2013–14	Södertälje SK	HockeyAllsvenskan	47	5	14	19	46	—	—	—	—	—
2014–15	Södertälje SK	HockeyAllsvenskan	43	4	11	15	71	10	4	3	7	35
2015–16	JYP Jyväskylä	Liiga	9	0	3	3	0	—	—	—	—	—
2015–16	Frederikshavn White Hawks	Denmark	15	3	5	8	4	13	3	2	5	4
2021–22	Brödernas Hockey	Division 4	1	2	4	6	2	—	—	—	—	—
Elitserien totals			463	63	84	147	380	10	1	0	1	27
