= Petr Průcha =

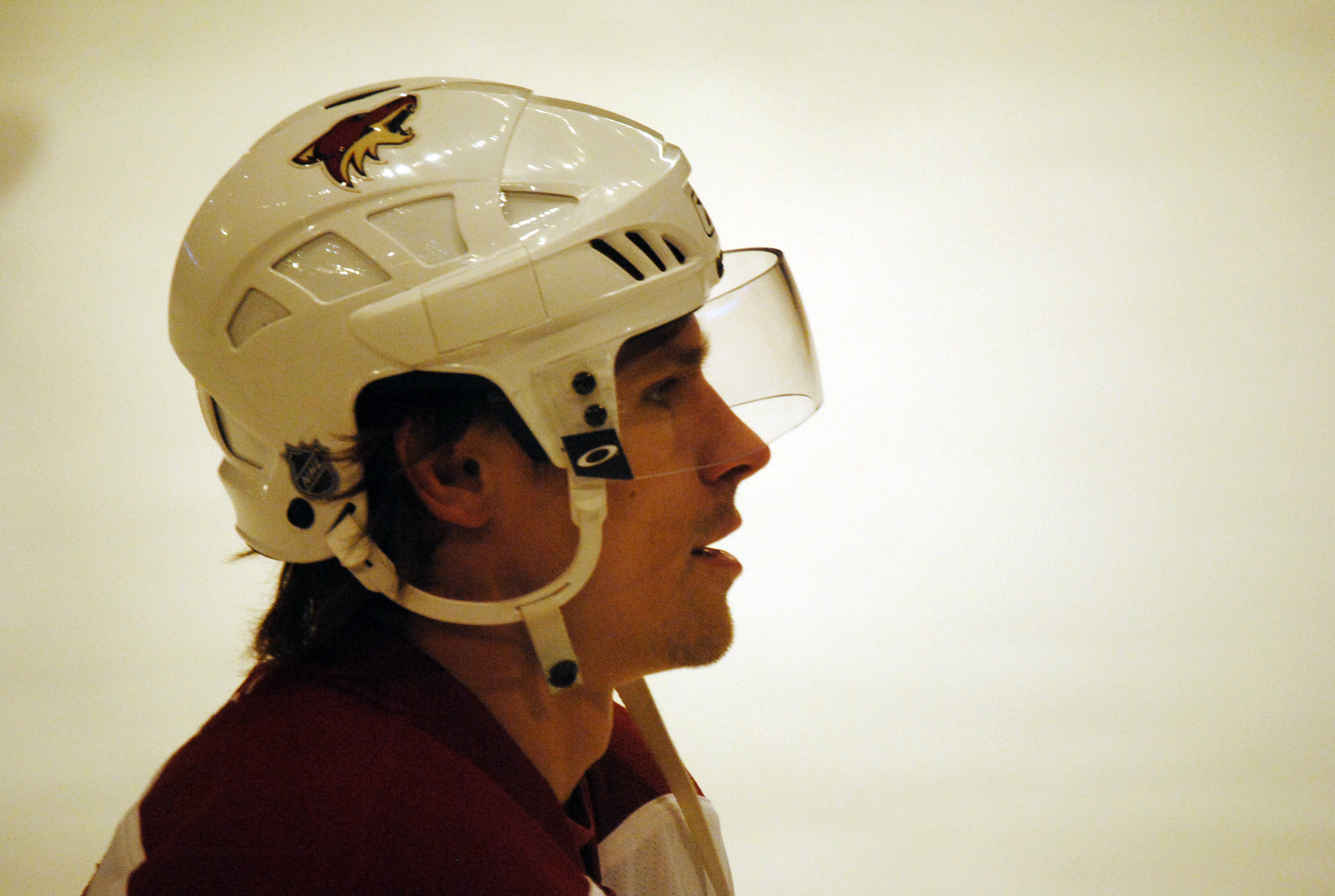
- Born: September 14, 1982 (age 43) Chrudim, Czechoslovakia
- Height: 6 ft 0 in (183 cm)
- Weight: 175 lb (79 kg; 12 st 7 lb)
- Position: Right wing
- Shot: Right
- Played for: HC Pardubice; New York Rangers; Phoenix Coyotes; SKA Saint Petersburg
- National team: Czech Republic
- NHL draft: 240th overall, 2002; New York Rangers
- Playing career: 2001–2013

Petr Průcha (born September 14, 1982) is a Czech former professional ice hockey forward who played in the National Hockey League (NHL) for the New York Rangers and the Phoenix Coyotes.

== Playing career ==
Průcha led the Czech Republic Junior League in points during the 2001–02 season (33 assists and 56 points in 25 games). He was drafted by the New York Rangers in the eighth round of the 2002 NHL entry draft, 240th overall. He played 47 games in the 2004–05 season for HC Moeller Pardubice in the Czech Extraliga, scoring seven goals with 17 points.

In the 2005–06 season, he joined the Rangers as a rookie. While playing along with his compatriot Jaromír Jágr, he scored 30 goals and 47 points in 68 games, and his 16 power play goals on the season broke Camille Henry's record for the single-season rookie power play goal mark for the Rangers.

On July 5, 2007, Průcha re-signed with the Rangers to a two-year, $3.2 million contract.

On March 4, 2009, Průcha was traded to the Phoenix Coyotes, along with Dimitri Kalinin and Nigel Dawes, in exchange for defenceman Derek Morris. On June 19, 2009, he signed a two-year, $2.2 million contract extension with the Coyotes, worth $1.1 million annually.

After playing unproductively for some time, the Coyotes assigned Průcha to the San Antonio Rampage of the American Hockey League (AHL), their top minor league affiliate. Unwilling to play for a minor league team, Průcha soon left for the Kontinental Hockey League (KHL) to play for SKA Saint Petersburg.

After two seasons with Saint Petersburg, Průcha sat out the following season before opting to retire due to injury.

== Career statistics ==
=== Regular season and playoffs ===
			Regular season					Playoffs
Season	Team	League	GP	G	A	Pts	PIM	GP	G	A	Pts	PIM
1999–2000	HC Chrudim	CZE.2 U20	39	26	18	44	58	14	9	9	18	4
2000–01	HC IPB Pojišťovna Pardubice	CZE U20	47	33	17	50	16	7	6	5	11	2
2001–02	HC IPB Pojišťovna Pardubice	CZE U20	28	38	28	66	18	3	6	2	8	0
2001–02	HC IPB Pojišťovna Pardubice	ELH	20	1	1	2	2	5	0	0	0	0
2001–02	HC Papíroví Draci Šumperk	CZE.2	8	6	4	10	0	—	—	—	—	—
2002–03	HC ČSOB Pojišťovna Pardubice	CZE U20	4	5	4	9	25	—	—	—	—	—
2002–03	HC ČSOB Pojišťovna Pardubice	ELH	49	7	9	16	12	17	2	6	8	8
2002–03	HC VČE Hradec Králové, a.s.	CZE.2	11	3	5	8	35	—	—	—	—	—
2003–04	HC Moeller Pardubice	ELH	48	11	13	24	24	7	4	3	7	2
2003–04	HC VČE Hradec Králové, a.s.	CZE.2	3	1	0	1	25	—	—	—	—	—
2004–05	HC Moeller Pardubice	ELH	47	7	10	17	24	16	6	7	13	2
2005–06	Hartford Wolf Pack	AHL	2	2	1	3	0	—	—	—	—	—
2005–06	New York Rangers	NHL	68	30	17	47	32	4	1	0	1	0
2006–07	New York Rangers	NHL	79	22	18	40	30	10	0	1	1	4
2007–08	New York Rangers	NHL	62	7	10	17	22	3	0	0	0	0
2008–09	New York Rangers	NHL	28	4	5	9	16	—	—	—	—	—
2008–09	Phoenix Coyotes	NHL	19	2	8	10	6	—	—	—	—	—
2009–10	Phoenix Coyotes	NHL	79	13	9	22	23	7	1	2	3	4
2010–11	Phoenix Coyotes	NHL	11	0	1	1	4	—	—	—	—	—
2010–11	San Antonio Rampage	AHL	20	8	13	21	2	—	—	—	—	—
2010–11	SKA St. Petersburg	KHL	11	1	2	3	4	11	5	1	6	14
2011–12	SKA St. Petersburg	KHL	52	14	26	40	20	15	2	1	3	4
2012–13	SKA St. Petersburg	KHL	37	14	5	19	26	5	0	2	2	2
ELH totals			164	26	33	59	62	45	12	16	28	12
NHL totals			346	78	68	146	132	24	2	3	5	8
KHL totals			100	29	33	62	50	31	7	4	11	20

Medal record

Representing Czech Republic

World Championships
Gold medal – first place	2005 Vienna	
Bronze medal – third place	2011 Bratislava	
Bronze medal – third place	2012 Helsinki	

=== International ===
Year	Team	Event	Result	GP	G	A	Pts	PIM
2002	Czech Republic	WJC	7th	7	1	0	1	2
2004	Czech Republic	WC	5th	7	3	1	4	6
2005	Czech Republic	WC	1st place, gold medalist(s)	3	0	0	0	0
2011	Czech Republic	WC	3rd place, bronze medalist(s)	9	3	2	5	2
2012	Czech Republic	WC	3rd place, bronze medalist(s)	10	1	2	3	4
Junior totals				7	1	0	1	2
Senior totals				29	7	5	12	12
