= Jan Kolář (ice hockey, born 1981) =

Czech ice hockey player

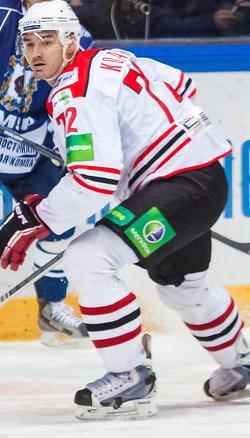
- Born: March 21, 1981 (age 45) Boskovice, Czechoslovakia
- Height: 6 ft 0 in (183 cm)
- Weight: 190 lb (86 kg; 13 st 8 lb)
- Position: Right wing
- Shoots: Left
- KHL team Former teams: HC Donbass; HC Pardubice; Neftekhimik Nizhnekamsk
- National team: Czech Republic
- Playing career: 1999–present

Jan Kolář (born March 21, 1981) is a Czech professional ice hockey winger who currently plays for HC Donbass in the Kontinental Hockey League.

== Career statistics ==
			Regular season					Playoffs
Season	Team	League	GP	G	A	Pts	PIM	GP	G	A	Pts	PIM
1999–00	HC Pardubice U20	Czech U20	45	18	15	33	59	5	1	1	2	8
1999–00	HC Pardubice	Czech	15	1	1	2	4	—	—	—	—	—
2000–01	HC Pardubice U20	Czech U20	32	23	23	46	67	7	2	4	6	4
2000–01	HC Pardubice	Czech	9	1	2	3	6	—	—	—	—	—
2000–01	HC Berounsti Medvedi	Czech2	17	1	2	3	0	—	—	—	—	—
2001–02	HC Pardubice	Czech	—	—	—	—	—	3	0	0	0	0
2001–02	HC Dukla Jihlava U20	Czech U20	7	8	1	9	0	—	—	—	—	—
2001–02	HC Dukla Jihlava	Czech2	37	6	10	16	28	13	3	5	8	4
2002–03	HC Pardubice	Czech	51	7	6	13	41	18	4	3	7	4
2002–03	HC Hradec Králové	Czech2	8	1	5	6	0	—	—	—	—	—
2003–04	HC Pardubice	Czech	50	11	8	19	16	1	0	0	0	0
2003–04	HC Hradec Králové	Czech2	1	1	1	2	0	—	—	—	—	—
2004–05	HC Pardubice	Czech	33	1	0	1	8	—	—	—	—	—
2004–05	HC Hradec Králové	Czech2	3	0	5	5	2	—	—	—	—	—
2005–06	HC Pardubice	Czech	49	5	5	10	18	—	—	—	—	—
2006–07	HC Pardubice	Czech	44	5	13	18	26	15	1	4	5	6
2007–08	HC Pardubice	Czech	17	3	4	7	14	—	—	—	—	—
2007–08	HC Hradec Králové	Czech2	2	0	0	0	0	7	0	6	6	14
2008–09	HC Pardubice	Czech	51	13	30	43	24	7	1	2	3	30
2009–10	HC Pardubice	Czech	36	5	15	20	32	13	2	8	10	22
2010–11	HC Pardubice	Czech	44	9	22	31	28	9	1	3	4	2
2011–12	HC Pardubice	Czech	52	26	25	51	32	19	4	9	13	28
2012–13	HC Neftekhimik Nizhnekamsk	KHL	6	1	3	4	4	—	—	—	—	—
2013–14	HC Pardubice	Czech	29	5	12	17	8	10	0	6	6	2
2013–14	HC Slavia Praha	Czech	5	4	1	5	8	—	—	—	—	—
2013–14	HC Neftekhimik Nizhnekamsk	KHL	7	1	1	2	0	—	—	—	—	—
2014–15	HC Pardubice	Czech	29	3	4	7	8	—	—	—	—	—
2014–15	HC Slavia Praha	Czech	18	1	5	6	4	—	—	—	—	—
2015–16	HC Dynamo Pardubice	Czech	15	1	2	3	4	—	—	—	—	—
2015–16	HC Sumperk	Czech2	5	0	1	1	0	—	—	—	—	—
2015–16	HC Dukla Jihlava	Czech2	13	6	4	10	12	10	3	2	5	20
2016–17	EK Zell am See	AlpsHL	33	11	31	42	28	—	—	—	—	—
2017–18	HC Trutnov	Czech3	15	5	14	19	45	—	—	—	—	—
2017–18	EK Zell am See	AlpsHL	20	3	9	12	14	—	—	—	—	—
Czech totals			547	101	155	256	281	105	13	36	49	98
