= Niklas Nordgren =

Swedish ice hockey player (born 1979)

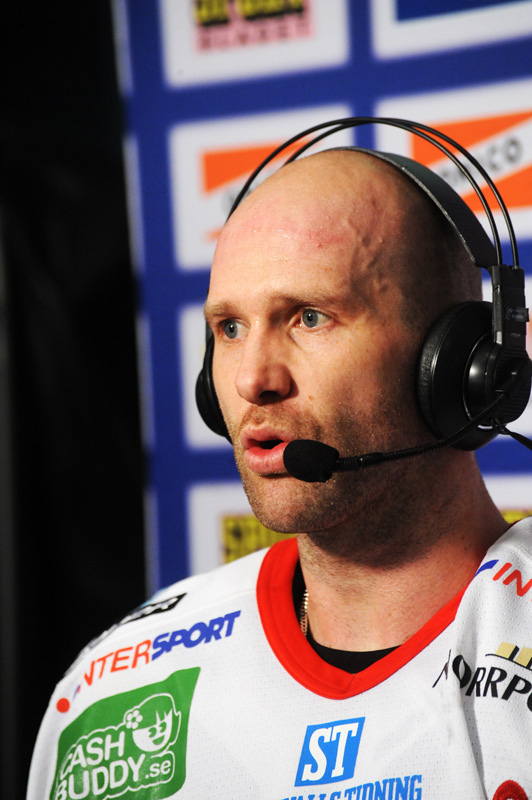
- Born: June 28, 1979 (age 46) Örnsköldsvik, Sweden
- Height: 5 ft 11 in (180 cm)
- Weight: 187 lb (85 kg; 13 st 5 lb)
- Position: Right wing
- Shot: Right
- Played for: Modo Hockey; Timrå IK; Carolina Hurricanes; Pittsburgh Penguins; Rapperswil-Jona Lakers; Kloten Flyers
- National team: Sweden
- NHL draft: 195th overall, 1997; Carolina Hurricanes
- Playing career: 1998–2015

Niklas Nordgren (born June 28, 1979) is a Swedish former professional ice hockey forward. He began and finished his career playing for Modo Hockey in the Swedish Hockey League (SHL).

== Playing career ==
Nordgren was drafted by the Carolina Hurricanes in Round 8, 195th overall at the 1997 NHL entry draft. However, he remained in Sweden and made his Swedish Elitserien debut with Modo Hockey in 1998–99. Nordgren became a regular in the Elite League with Timrå IK in 2001–02 and played four seasons there.

Nordgren made the transition to North America in 2005–06, and split time between Carolina and their AHL affiliate Lowell before being traded to the Pittsburgh Penguins with Krystofer Kolanos and a 2007 2nd-round pick at the March 9th trade deadline for forward Mark Recchi.

On May 10, 2006, Nordgren signed a deal with the Rapperswil-Jona Lakers, based in Switzerland, where he would play the next five seasons.

After a season stint in returning to the SHL with Timrå IK, Nordgren signed for his original club Modo during the 2013-14 season on November 27, 2013.

== Career statistics ==
			Regular season					Playoffs
Season	Team	League	GP	G	A	Pts	PIM	GP	G	A	Pts	PIM
1996–97	Modo Hockey	J20	22	14	6	20	—	—	—	—	—	—
1996–97	Modo Hockey	SEL	5	0	0	0	0	—	—	—	—	—
1997–98	Modo Hockey	J20	28	15	15	30	52	—	—	—	—	—
1998–99	Modo Hockey	SEL	7	0	0	0	2	—	—	—	—	—
1998–99	Modo Hockey	J20	1	0	0	0	2	—	—	—	—	—
1998–99	Örnsköldsviks SK	Div. 1	25	9	5	14	22	—	—	—	—	—
1999–00	IF Sundsvall Hockey	Swe.1	37	21	11	32	58	—	—	—	—	—
2000–01	IF Sundsvall Hockey	Swe.1	35	22	19	41	57	—	—	—	—	—
2001–02	Timrå IK	SEL	49	8	6	14	16	—	—	—	—	—
2002–03	Timrå IK	SEL	47	20	23	43	40	10	1	4	5	4
2003–04	Timrå IK	SEL	46	13	15	28	44	10	4	1	5	32
2004–05	Timrå IK	SEL	46	19	17	36	71	7	0	2	2	6
2005–06	Carolina Hurricanes	NHL	43	4	2	6	30	—	—	—	—	—
2005–06	Lowell Lock Monsters	AHL	8	6	4	10	10	—	—	—	—	—
2005–06	Pittsburgh Penguins	NHL	15	0	0	0	4	—	—	—	—	—
2006–07	Rapperswil-Jona Lakers	NLA	41	17	13	30	74	6	1	1	2	10
2007–08	Rapperswil-Jona Lakers	NLA	49	20	31	51	131	5	5	1	6	16
2008–09	Rapperswil-Jona Lakers	NLA	49	25	28	53	86	—	—	—	—	—
2009–10	Rapperswil-Jona Lakers	NLA	39	6	19	25	8	—	—	—	—	—
2010–11	Rapperswil-Jona Lakers	NLA	46	14	25	39	44	—	—	—	—	—
2011–12	Kloten Flyers	NLA	14	4	5	9	14	3	1	1	2	8
2012–13	Timrå IK	SEL	43	8	20	28	30	—	—	—	—	—
2013–14	Modo Hockey	SHL	28	1	8	9	28	2	1	0	1	0
2014–15	Modo Hockey	SHL	51	8	10	18	18	—	—	—	—	—
NHL totals			58	4	2	6	34	—	—	—	—	—
SHL totals			322	77	99	176	249	29	6	7	13	42
NLA totals			238	86	121	207	357	14	7	3	10	34
