= Jukka Jalonen =

Finnish ice hockey player and coach

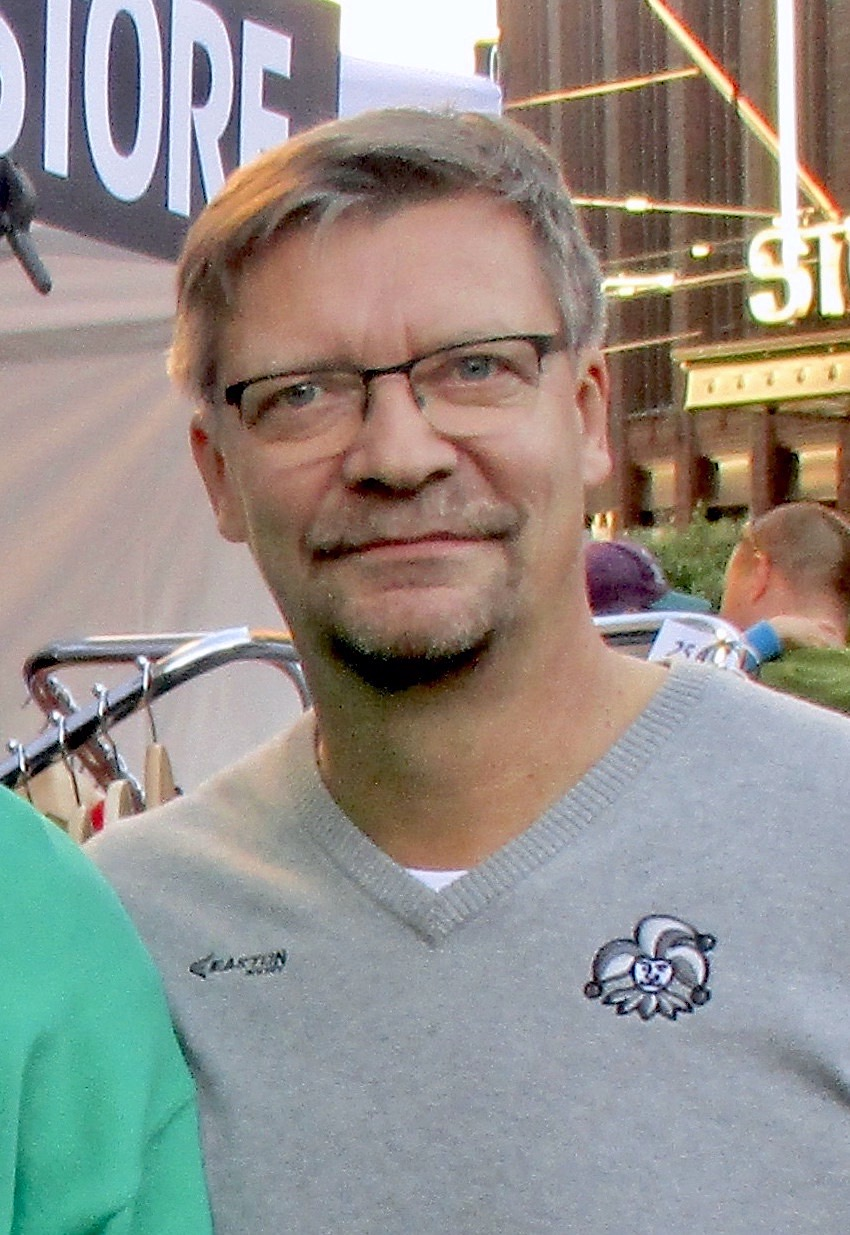
- Jalonen in 2016
- Born: 2 November 1962 (age 63) Riihimäki, Finland
Medal record
Representing Finland
Ice hockey
Winter Olympics
Gold medal – first place	2022 Beijing
Bronze medal – third place	2010 Vancouver
IIHF World Championship
Gold medal – first place	2011 Slovakia
Gold medal – first place	2019 Slovakia
Gold medal – first place	2022 Finland
Silver medal – second place	2021 Latvia
IIHF World Championship Division I
Silver medal – second place	2025 Romania I A
IIHF World Junior Championship
Gold medal – first place	2016 Finland
Euro Hockey Tour
Gold medal – first place	2009–10
Silver medal – second place	2008–09
Silver medal – second place	2011–12
Silver medal – second place	2018–19
Silver medal – second place	2021–22
Silver medal – second place	2023–24
Bronze medal – third place	2010–11
Bronze medal – third place	2012–13
Bronze medal – third place	2019–20
Bronze medal – third place	2022–23

Jukka Pertti Juhani Jalonen (born 2 November 1962 in Riihimäki, Finland) is a Finnish professional ice hockey coach and former player. In 2011, 2019 and 2022, he led the Finnish national team to the gold medal in the IIHF World Championship, and at the 2022 Winter Olympics, he coached the team that won Finland's first ever Olympic gold in ice hockey. He was the head coach of Jokerit and SKA Saint Petersburg in the Kontinental Hockey League during 2012–2018 before returning to coach the Finnish national team. He is the only coach who has led his team to the Olympic Games, the World Championship, the World Junior (U20) Championship, and the KHL Finals.

== Playing career ==
During his playing career, Jalonen appeared in two SM-liiga games for JyP HT in the 1985–86 season. He also played for JYP, Jääahmat and Lohi in lower divisions.

== Coaching career ==
Jalonen started his coaching career with SM-Liiga sides, managing Ilves from 1992 to 1995, and Lukko during the 1996–97 season. Afterwards, he took over Mestis side Vaasan Sport for the 1997–98 season. After a one-year stint with Sport, Jalonen spent three seasons abroad. First, he coached HC Alleghe in Italy and then two seasons in the United Kingdom, with the Newcastle RiverKings and Newcastle Jesters in the British Ice Hockey Superleague, respectively. For the 2001–02 season, Jalonen returned to Finland and signed with HPK. He went on to spend six seasons with HPK, and led the team to remarkable success with placing third in the SM-liiga in 2001–02, 2002–03 and 2004–05. His era in Hämeenlinna reached a climax in 2005–06, when he led HPK to win the first Kanada-malja in the franchise history. The same year, he was awarded with the Kalevi Numminen trophy for being the best coach in the league. In his last season with HPK in 2006–07, Jalonen added yet another SM-liiga bronze medal to his record.

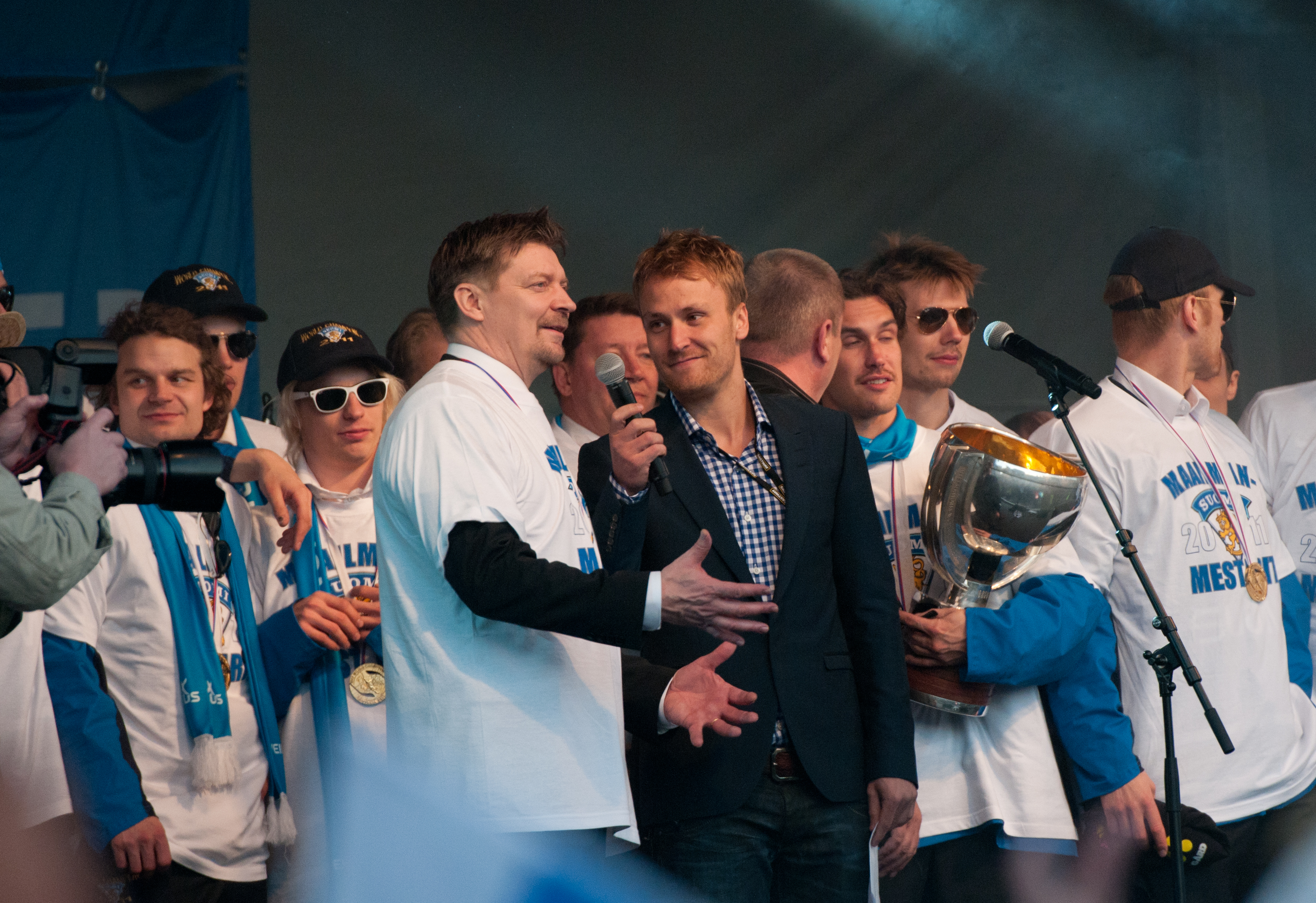
Heikki Paasonen interviewing Jukka Jalonen at 2011 IIHF World Championship gold medal celebrations in Helsinki

After his years in HPK, Jalonen started coaching the Finnish national team, first in the role of an assistant coach under Doug Shedden in 2007–08, and then as the head coach from 2008–09 onward. In 2010, Jalonen's team won the Olympic bronze medal in Vancouver, and in 2011 he coached the Finnish national team to the country's second World Championship title. In the final game, Finland defeated arch rivals Sweden with a score 6–1. While Jalonen remained as the head coach of the national team until the end of 2012–13 season, the national team failed to win additional medals under his tenure. During the 2012–13 season Jalonen signed with KHL side SKA St Petersburg, replacing Miloš Říha during the season. He went on to lead the team to conference finals in the Gagarin Cup. He stayed with SKA the following season, 2013–14, but the team's run ended in a loss in conference semi-finals.

For the 2016 World Juniors that were organised in Finland, Jalonen was hired to coach the Finnish U20 team. He successfully led the Finnish team to a World Junior Championship title on home ice, beating Russia with a score 4–3 (OT) in the final at the Hartwall Arena.

In the 2016–17 season, Jalonen returned to the KHL with the Jokerit. Jokerit made the playoffs but were knocked out in the first round of the Gagarin Cup. In 2017, Jalonen was re-elected to the Finnish national team as head coach, replacing Lauri Marjamäki after the 2018 World Championship. The contract originally covered the seasons 2018–2020, and was later extended by another two years to include the 2021–22 season. After his successful performances, which included gold medals at the 2019 IIHF World Championship and 2022 Winter Olympics, and a silver medal at the 2021 IIHF World Championship, Jalonen extended his contract to 2024. In June 2023, after another gold medal at the 2022 IIHF World Championship but a disappointing quarterfinals exit in 2023 he announced that he would be leaving the national team after his contract runs out.

In 2024, Jalonen signed a two-year contract to become the head coach of the Italian national team. Jalonen wants to raise the level of Italian hockey before the 2026 Winter Olympics. Jukka Jalonen has also mentioned that this is a very good challenge at an unknown level. Jalonen has lived in Italy for a year (as head coach of Alleghe Hockey in 1998-99) and likes the lifestyle there.

== Coaching awards and honors ==
As head coach:

- (gold) Winter Olympics (1): 2022
- (bronze) Winter Olympics (1): 2010
- (gold) IIHF World Championship (3): 2011, 2019, 2022
- (silver) IIHF World Championship (1): 2021
- (silver) IIHF World Championship Division I (1): 2025
- (gold) IIHF World U20 Championship (1): 2016
- (gold) Euro Hockey Tour (1): 2009–10
- (silver) Euro Hockey Tour (5): 2008–09, 2011–12, 2018–19, 2021–22, 2023–24
- (bronze) Euro Hockey Tour (4): 2010–11, 2012–13, 2019–20, 2022–23
- (silver) IIHF European Champions Cup (1): 2007
- (gold) SM-liiga, Kanada-malja (1): 2005–06
- (bronze) SM-liiga (4): 2001–02, 2002–03, 2004–05, 2006–07
- (silver) World U-17 Hockey Challenge: 1995
- (gold) European Junior Challenge: 1994.

As assistant coach:

- (bronze) IIHF World Championship (1): 2008

Individual:

- KHL All-Star Game: 2013, 2014, 2018
- Finnish Coach of the Year: 2011, 2016, 2022
- SM-Liiga Coach of the Year (Kalevi Numminen Trophy): 2006
- Finnish Hockey Hall of Fame (Jääkiekkoleijona): 2012
- Finland: Order of the White Rose of Finland: 2022
- Honorary Doctorate, University of Jyväskylä: 2023

== Trivia ==
- Along with Mike Babcock, Jalonen is the only coach in history to have won both the IIHF World Championships and IIHF World U20 Championships.
- Jukka Jalonen is not related to Kari Jalonen, who succeeded him as the head coach of the Finnish national team.

Preceded by Kari Jalonen	Kalevi Numminen trophy 2005–06	Succeeded by Kari Jalonen
Preceded by Doug Shedden	Finnish national ice hockey team coach 2008–2013	Succeeded by Erkka Westerlund
Preceded by Lauri Marjamäki	Finnish national ice hockey team coach 2019–2024	Succeeded by Antti Pennanen
Preceded by Mike Pelino	Italian national ice hockey team coach 2024–2026	Succeeded by -
