= 2006 LG Hockey Games =

Tournament details
- Host countries: Sweden; Finland
- Cities: Stockholm; Helsinki
- Venues: 2 (in 2 host cities)
- Dates: 26–29 April 2006
- Teams: 4

Final positions
- Champions: Russia (2nd title)
- Runners-up: Finland
- Third place: Sweden
- Fourth place: Czech Republic

Tournament statistics
- Games played: 6
- Goals scored: 40 (6.67 per game)
- Attendance: 41,714 (6,952 per game)
- Scoring leader: (Russia) Danis Zaripov (4 points)

The 2006 LG Hockey Games was played between 26 and 29 April 2006 in Stockholm, Sweden. The Czech Republic, Finland, Sweden and Russia played a round-robin for a total of three games per team and six games in total. Five of the matches were played in the Globen in Stockholm, Sweden, and one match in the Hartwall Arena in Helsinki, Finland. The tournament was won by Russia. The tournament was part of 2005–06 Euro Hockey Tour.

The tournament was played in late-April instead of early-February because of the 2006 Olympic tournament in Turin, Italy.

== Standings ==
Pos	Team	Pld	W	OTW	SOW	OTL	SOL	L	GF	GA	GD	Pts
1	Russia	3	2	0	0	0	0	1	16	13	+3	6
2	Finland	3	2	0	0	0	0	1	8	4	+4	6
3	Sweden	3	2	0	0	0	0	1	10	8	+2	6
4	Czech Republic	3	0	0	0	0	0	3	6	15	−9	0

Source: swehockey

== Games ==
All times are local. Stockholm – (Central European Time – UTC+1) Helsinki – (Eastern European Time – UTC+2)

26 April 2006; 18:30	Finland	1-3 (0-0, 0-1, 1-2)	Russia	Hartwall Arena, Helsinki; Attendance: 7,486

Game reference

Niklas Bäckström
Goalies
Maxim Sokolov
Referee:
(Czech Republic) Milan Minar
Linesmen:
(Finland) Antti Hämäläinen
(Finland) Mikko Kekäläinen

	0-1	23:55 – Kirill Koltsov (Alexander Kharitonov)
	0-2	50:11 – Igor Yemeleyev (Maxim Sushinsky)
57:22 – Riku Hahl (Mikko Lehtonen, Jukka Hentunen) (PP)	1-2
	1-3	58:37 – Igor Grigorenko (Sergey Mozyakin, Kirill Koltsov)

14 min
Penalties
20 min
39
Shots
28

26 April 2006; 19:00	Sweden	3-0 (1-0, 1-0, 1-0)	Czech Republic	Globen, Stockholm; Attendance: 7,251

Game reference

Daniel Henriksson
Goalies
Milan Hnilicka
Referee:
(Finland) Jari Levonen
Linesmen:
(Finland) Leo Takula
(Sweden) Fredrik Carlman

08:18 – Fredrik Emvall (Andreas Holmqvist, Tony Mårtensson) (PP)	1-0
26:05 – Fredrik Emvall (Jonas Nordquist)	2-0
56:24 – Tony Mårtensson (Andreas Holmqvist, Fredrik Emvall)	3-0

16 min
Penalties
10 min
18
Shots
34

28 April 2006; 15:30	Czech Republic	1-5 (0-2, 0-1, 1-2)	Finland	Globen, Stockholm; Attendance: 1,268

Game reference

Milan Hnilicka
Goalies
Fredrik Norrena
Referee:
(Sweden) Marcus Vinnerborg
Linesmen:
(Finland) Leo Takula
(Sweden) Per Svensson

	0-1	01:59 – Ville Peltonen (Petteri Nummelin, Jari Viuhkola)
	0-2	15:29 – Kalle Kerman (Lasse Kukkonen, Jani Rita) (PP)
	0-3	25:29 – Jukka Hentunen (Jari Viuhkola, Aki-Petteri Berg) (PP)
	0-4	45:01 – Jari Viuhkola (Jukka Hentunen, Petteri Nummelin) (PP)
50:46 – David Vyborny (Jan Hlavac)	1-4
	1-5	52:19 – Tommi Santala (Riku Hahl)

22 min
Penalties
16 min
31
Shots
26

28 April 2006; 19:00	Sweden	7-6 (2-3, 4-0, 1-3)	Russia	Globen, Stockholm; Attendance: 8,386

Game reference

Stefan Liv
Goalies
Alexander Fomichev
Referee:
(Finland) Jari Levonen
Linesmen:
(Sweden) Peer Lyth
(Sweden) Fredrik Ulriksson

	0-1	10:27 – Jevgenij Malkin (Kirill Koltsov)
	0-2	13:42 – Alexander Semin
15:15 – Jörgen Jönsson (Nicklas Bäckström)	1-2
	1-3	17:48 – Danis Zaripov (Alexander Nikulin)
19:20 – Jonas Nordquist (Tony Mårtensson)	2-3
22:36 – Jesper Mattsson (Magnus Johansson, Christian Berglund) (PP)	3-3
28:09 – Magnus Johansson (Andreas Karlsson) (PP)	4-3
35:41 – Jesper Mattsson (Christian Berglund, Per Hållberg) (PP)	5-3
39:45 – Christian Berglund (Jesper Mattsson, Magnus Johansson) (PP)	6-3
	6-4	42:52 – Danis Zaripov (Andrei Kruchinin) (PP)
47:24 – Stefan Pettersson (Andreas Karlsson) (PP)	7-4
	7-5	47:39 – Alexei Mikhnov (Ilya Nikulin)
	7-6	59:10 – Alexander Semin

22 min
Penalties
43 min
39
Shots
31

29 April 2006; 12:00	Russia	7-5 (4-0, 1-3, 2-2)	Czech Republic	Globen, Stockholm; Attendance: 3,473

Game reference

Sergey Zvyagin
Goalies
Tomas Pöpperle
Referee:
(Sweden) Thomas Andersson
Linesmen:
(Sweden) Peter Lyth
(Sweden) Daniel Winge

00:46 – Alexei Mikhnov (Denis Arkhipov)	1-0
06:49 – Igor Yemeleyev (Andrei Kruchinin, Maxim Sushinsky)	2-0
14:11 – Maxim Sushinsky (Ilya Nikulin, Alexander Kharitonov)	3-0
19:50 – Danis Zaripov (Nikolay Kulemin, Evgeny Malkin)	4-0
22:04 – Vitaly Atyushov (Nikolay Kulemin, Danis Zaripov)	5-0
	5-1	32:26 – Patrik Stefan (Tomas Rolinek)
	5-2	33:35 – Petr Hubacek (Patrik Stefan)
	5-3	36:45 – Ivo Prorok
	5-4	42:41 – Zbynek Irgl (Jan Marek)
43:09 – Alexander Semin (Denis Arkhipov, Alexei Mikhnov)	6-4
48:29 – Maxim Sushinsky (Igor Yemeleyev)	7-4
	7-5	58:50 – Jan Peterek (Jiri Hunkes)

29 April 2006; 15:30	Sweden	0-2 (0-1, 0-0, 0-1)	Finland	Globen, Stockholm; Attendance: 13,850

Game reference
Johan Holmqvist	Goalies	Niklas Bäckström	Referee: (Czech Republic) Milan Minar; Linesmen: (Sweden) Per Svensson (Sweden) Fredrik Ulriksson
0-1 / 01:00 – Tommi Santala (Mikko Lehtonen, Riku Hahl) (PP); 0-2 / 45:41 – Mikko Koivu (Jani Rita)			Referee: (Czech Republic) Milan Minar; Linesmen: (Sweden) Per Svensson (Sweden) Fredrik Ulriksson
28 min	Penalties	18 min	Referee: (Czech Republic) Milan Minar; Linesmen: (Sweden) Per Svensson (Sweden) Fredrik Ulriksson
36	Shots	25	Referee: (Czech Republic) Milan Minar; Linesmen: (Sweden) Per Svensson (Sweden) Fredrik Ulriksson

== Scoring leaders ==
Pos	Player	Country	GP	G	A	Pts	+/−	PIM	POS
1	Danis Zaripov	Russia	3	3	1	4	+2	2	LW
2	Fredrik Emvall	Sweden	2	2	2	4	+4	0	CE
3	Maxim Sushinsky	Russia	3	2	2	4	+5	0	RW
4	Alexander Semin	Russia	3	3	0	3	+5	0	LW
5	Alexei Mikhnov	Russia	3	2	1	3	+4	0	LW

GP = Games played; G = Goals; A = Assists; Pts = Points; +/− = Plus/minus; PIM = Penalties in minutes; POS = Position
Source: swehockey

== Goaltending leaders ==
Pos	Player	Country	TOI	GA	GAA	Sv%	SO
1	Niklas Bäckström	Finland	120:00	3	1.50	95.31	1
2	Sergei Zvyagin	Russia	89:59	8	5.33	82.22	0
3	Milan Hnilička	Czech Republic	120:00	8	4.00	81.82	0

TOI = Time on ice (minutes:seconds); SA = Shots against; GA = Goals against; GAA = Goals Against Average; Sv% = Save percentage; SO = Shutouts
Source: swehockey

== Tournament awards ==
The tournament directorate named the following players in the tournament 2006:

- Best goalkeeper: (Sweden) Daniel Henriksson
- Best defenceman: (Sweden) Kenny Jönsson
- Best forward: (Russia) Aleksandr Semin

Media All-Star Team:

- Goaltender: (Sweden) Daniel Henriksson
- Defence: (Finland) Aki-Petteri Berg, (Sweden) Kenny Jönsson
- Forwards: (Russia) Aleksandr Semin, (Russia) Evgeni Malkin, (Sweden) Jesper Mattsson
