= 2026–27 Euro Hockey Tour =

Tournament details
- Venues: 6 (in 6 host cities)
- Dates: 5 November 2026 – 9 May 2027
- Teams: 4

Tournament statistics
- Games played: 24

The 2026–27 Euro Hockey Tour is the 31st season of Euro Hockey Tour. It will run from November 2026 to May 2027. It consists of Karjala Tournament, Swiss Ice Hockey Games, Beijer Hockey Games and Czech Hockey Games.

== Standings ==
Pos	Team	Pld	W	OTW	OTL	L	GF	GA	GD	Pts
1	Finland	3	2	1	0	0	8	4	+4	8
2	Sweden	3	1	1	0	1	9	7	+2	5
3	Czech Republic	3	1	0	2	0	7	7	0	5
4	Switzerland	3	0	0	0	3	5	11	−6	0

Updated to match(es) played on 8 November 2026. Source:

== Karjala Tournament ==
The NOCCO Hockey Game are played 5–8 November 2026. Five matches will be played in Helsinki, Finland, and one game in Prague, Czech Republic (Czech Republic vs Sweden).

Pos	Team	Pld	W	OTW	OTL	L	GF	GA	GD	Pts
1	Finland	3	2	1	0	0	8	4	+4	8
2	Sweden	3	1	1	0	1	9	7	+2	5
3	Czech Republic	3	1	0	2	0	7	7	0	5
4	Switzerland	3	0	0	0	3	5	11	−6	0

Updated to match(es) played on 5 November 2026. Source: Leijonat.com

5 November 2026
Czech Republic	2–3 (GWS)	Sweden
Switzerland	1-3	Finland
7 November 2026
Sweden	4-2	Switzerland
Finland	2–1 (GWS)	Czech Republic
8 November 2026
Czech Republic	4-2	Switzerland
Finland	3-2	Sweden

== SWISS Ice Hockey Games ==
The 2026 Swiss Ice Hockey Games are played 10–13 December 2026. Five matches will be played in Swiss Life Arena in Zurich, Switzerland.

Pos	Team	Pld	W	OTW	OTL	L	GF	GA	GD	Pts
1	Czech Republic	0	0	0	0	0	0	0	0	0
2	Finland	0	0	0	0	0	0	0	0	0
3	Switzerland	0	0	0	0	0	0	0	0	0
4	Sweden	0	0	0	0	0	0	0	0	0

Updated to match(es) played on unknown. Source:

10 December 2026
Switzerland	TBD	Sweden
Finland	TBD	Czech Republic
12 December 2026
Finland	TBD	Sweden
Switzerland	TBD	Czech Republic
13 December 2026
Czech Republic	TBD	Sweden
Switzerland	TBD	Finland

== Beijer Hockey Games ==
The 2027 Beijer Hockey Games are played 11–14 February 2027. Five matches will be played in Avicii Arena in Stockholm, Sweden and one match in TBA, Switzerland.

Pos	Team	Pld	W	OTW	OTL	L	GF	GA	GD	Pts
1	Czech Republic	0	0	0	0	0	0	0	0	0
2	Finland	0	0	0	0	0	0	0	0	0
3	Switzerland	0	0	0	0	0	0	0	0	0
4	Sweden	0	0	0	0	0	0	0	0	0

Updated to match(es) played on unknown. Source: swehockey.se

11 February 2027
Finland	TBD	Switzerland
Czech Republic	TBD	Sweden
13 February 2027
Czech Republic	TBD	Finland
Sweden	TBD	Switzerland
14 February 2027
Switzerland	TBD	Czech Republic
Sweden	TBD	Finland

== Czech Hockey Games ==
The 2027 Czech Hockey Games are played 6–9 May 2027.

Pos	Team	Pld	W	OTW	OTL	L	GF	GA	GD	Pts
1	Czech Republic	0	0	0	0	0	0	0	0	0
2	Finland	0	0	0	0	0	0	0	0	0
3	Switzerland	0	0	0	0	0	0	0	0	0
4	Sweden	0	0	0	0	0	0	0	0	0

Updated to match(es) played on unknown. Source:

6 May 2027
Czech Republic	TBD	Finland
Switzerland	TBD	Sweden
8 May 2027
Switzerland	TBD	Finland
Czech Republic	TBD	Sweden
9 May 2027
Sweden	TBD	Finland
Czech Republic	TBD	Switzerland
