= 2027 Czech Hockey Games =

2027 Fortuna Hockey Games (Euro Hockey Games)
Tournament details
- Host countries: Czech Republic; TBA
- Cities: České Budějovice; TBA
- Venues: 2 (in 2 host cities)
- Dates: 6–9 May 2027
- Teams: 4

The 2027 Fortuna Hockey Gamesare played between 6 May and 9 May 2027. The Czech Republic, Finland, Sweden and Switzerland will play a round-robin for a total of three games per team and six games in total. Five of the games will be played in TBA, Czech Republic and one game in TBA, TBA. The tournament is part of the 2026–27 Euro Hockey Tour.

== Standings ==
Pos	Team	Pld	W	OTW	OTL	L	GF	GA	GD	Pts
1	Czech Republic	0	0	0	0	0	0	0	0	0
2	Finland	0	0	0	0	0	0	0	0	0
3	Switzerland	0	0	0	0	0	0	0	0	0
4	Sweden	0	0	0	0	0	0	0	0	0

Updated to match(es) played on unknown. Source:

== Games ==
All times are local. TBA – (Central European Summer Time – UTC+2) TBA – (Central European Summer Time – UTC+2)

6 May 2027; 18:00	Finland	v	Czech Republic

6 May 2027; 18:00	Sweden	v	Switzerland

8 May 2027; 12:00	Switzerland	v	Finland

8 May 2027; 16:00	Czech Republic	v	Sweden

9 May 2027; 12:00	Sweden	v	Finland

9 May 2027; 16:00	Czech Republic	v	Switzerland
