= 2026 Swiss Ice Hockey Games =

2026 Swiss Ice Hockey Games (Euro Hockey Games)
Tournament details
- Host countries: Switzerland; Czech Republic
- Cities: Zurich; Plzeň
- Venues: 2 (in 2 host cities)
- Dates: 10–13 December 2026
- Teams: 4

The 2026 Swiss Ice Hockey Games are played between 11 and 14 December 2026. The Czech Republic, Finland, Sweden and Switzerland played a round-robin for a total of three games per team and six games in total. Five of the games were played in Zurich, Switzerland, and one game in Plzeň, Czech Republic. The tournament is part of the 2026–27 Euro Hockey Tour.

== Standings ==
Pos	Team	Pld	W	OTW	OTL	L	GF	GA	GD	Pts
1	Czech Republic	0	0	0	0	0	0	0	0	0
2	Finland	0	0	0	0	0	0	0	0	0
3	Switzerland	0	0	0	0	0	0	0	0	0
4	Sweden	0	0	0	0	0	0	0	0	0

== Games ==
All times are local. Zürich – (Central European Time – UTC+1) TBA – (Central European Time – UTC+1)

10 December 2026; 18:30	Czech Republic	v	Finland	Logspeed CZ Aréna, Plzeň

10 December 2026; 19:45	Switzerland	v	Sweden	Swiss Life Arena, Zürich

12 December 2026; 14:00	Finland	v	Sweden	Swiss Life Arena, Zürich

12 December 2026; 18:00	Switzerland	v	Czech Republic	Swiss Life Arena, Zürich

13 December 2026; 11:45	Czech Republic	v	Sweden	Swiss Life Arena, Zürich

13 December 2026; 15:45	Switzerland	v	Finland	Swiss Life Arena, Zürich
