= 2027 Sweden Hockey Games =

2027 Beijer Hockey Games (Euro Hockey Tour)
Tournament details
- Host countries: Sweden; Switzerland
- Cities: Stockholm; TBA
- Venues: 2 (in 2 host cities)
- Dates: 11–14 February 2027
- Teams: 4

Official website
- swehockey

The 2027 Beijer Hockey Games are played between 11 and 14 February 2027. The Czech Republic, Finland, Sweden and Switzerland played a round-robin for a total of three games per team and six games in total. Five of the games are played in Stockholm, Sweden in Avicii Arena and one in TBA, Switzerland in TBA. The tournament is part of 2026–27 Euro Hockey Tour

== Standings ==
Pos	Team	Pld	W	OTW	OTL	L	GF	GA	GD	Pts
1	Finland	0	0	0	0	0	0	0	0	0
2	Czech Republic	0	0	0	0	0	0	0	0	0
3	Switzerland	0	0	0	0	0	0	0	0	0
4	Sweden	0	0	0	0	0	0	0	0	0

Updated to match(es) played on unknown. Source:

== Games ==
All times are local. Stockholm – (Central European Summer Time) TBA – (Central European Time – UTC+1)

11 February 2026; TBA	Switzerland	v	Finland	TBA, TBA

11 February 2026; 19:00	Czech Republic	v	Sweden	Avicii Arena, Stockholm

13 February 2026; 12:00	Finland	v	Czech Republic	Avicii Arena, Stockholm

12 February 2026; 16:00	Sweden	v	Switzerland	Avicii Arena, Stockholm

13 February 2026; 12:00	Switzerland	v	Czech Republic	Avicii Arena, Stockholm

13 February 2026; 16:00	Sweden	v	Finland	Avicii Arena, Stockholm
