= Doug Shedden =

Canadian ice hockey player (born 1961)

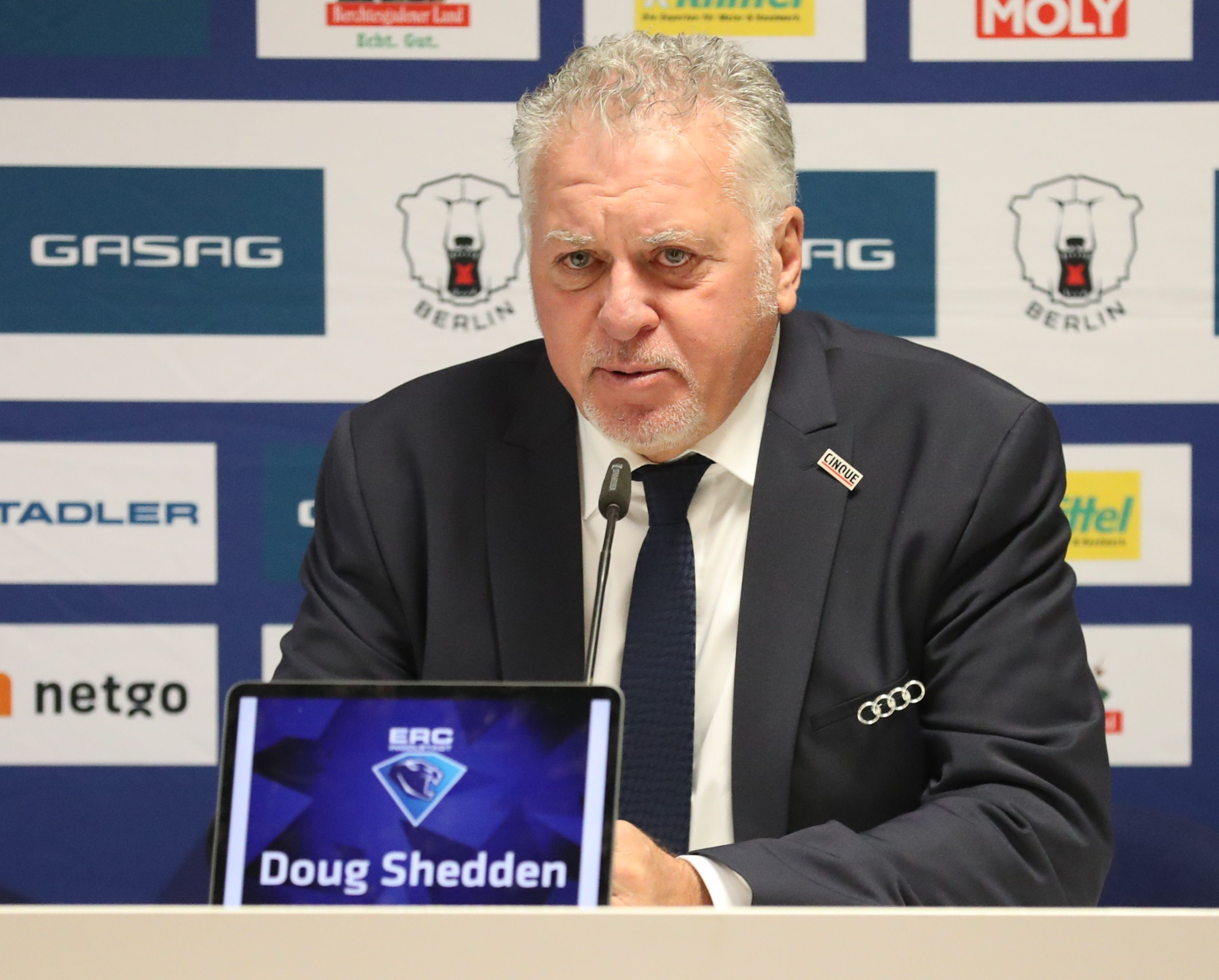
- Born: April 29, 1961 (age 65) Wallaceburg, Ontario, Canada
- Height: 6 ft 0 in (183 cm)
- Weight: 185 lb (84 kg; 13 st 3 lb)
- Position: Centre
- Shot: Right
- Played for: Pittsburgh Penguins; Detroit Red Wings; Quebec Nordiques; Toronto Maple Leafs; HC Bolzano; HC Davos
- NHL draft: 93rd overall, 1980; Pittsburgh Penguins
- Playing career: 1981–1993

Douglas Arthur Shedden (born April 29, 1961) is a Canadian ice hockey coach and former player. He played in the National Hockey League (NHL) between 1981 and 1991. After his playing career he became a coach, and worked in the minor leagues for several years. He coached Team Finland to a bronze medal in 2008 World Championships. Shedden is currently coaching Milano HC in the international league ICE Hockey League.

== Playing career ==
As a youth, Shedden played in the 1974 Quebec International Pee-Wee Hockey Tournament with a minor ice hockey team from Barrie.

Shedden, who played the position of centre, spent eight seasons playing in the National Hockey League for the Pittsburgh Penguins, Detroit Red Wings, Quebec Nordiques and Toronto Maple Leafs. He was drafted 93rd overall by the Penguins in the 1980 NHL entry draft. In 416 career NHL games, Shedden recorded 139 goals and 186 assists for 325 points. Shedden had a brief stint in Europe as he played in Italy for two seasons but returned to North America and retired from playing in 1993.

== Coaching career ==
Shedden's Career as head coach started when he was hired to take over the Wichita Thunder in 1992. After leading Wichita to back-to-back CHL championships in 1993-94 and 1994–95, Shedden coached several teams in UHL, CHL and ECHL before becoming the head coach for St. John's Maple Leafs of the AHL, where he guided the team to their best record for wins in franchise history in their final year in St. John's.

After that Shedden was hired by Finnish SM-liiga team HIFK to replace Dave King, who had decided to go to Metallurg Magnitogorsk of the Russian Superleague instead of HIFK. Shedden's single season at the helm of HIFK was good and the team fought its way to the bronze medal game. HIFK however lost to HPK.

After his debut in the SM-liiga, Shedden was acquired by HIFK's local rivals Jokerit, where Shedden made an impact during his first season as the head coach of the team. Jokerit survived all the way to the Finals but were defeated by Kärpät. Shedden's second season as the head coach of Jokerit was a bit of a disappointment. Jokerit did advance to the playoffs, but were defeated four games to three by Espoo Blues in the Semifinals even though Jokerit had a 3–1 lead in the best-of-seven series.

The 2007–08 Season with Jokerit was Shedden's last, as he was contracted by EV Zug, a Swiss professional ice hockey team playing in the Swiss Nationalliga A (NLA). He spent six years at the Zug helm and coached EVZ to five playoff semifinal appearances. When Zug finished the 2013-14 regular season in 10th place and missed the playoffs, Shedden was relieved of his duties.

In October 2014, Shedden took over the reins at Medveščak Zagreb of the Kontinental Hockey League (KHL) and parted ways with the team at the end of the 2014–15 season. He returned to Switzerland, accepting the head coaching job at NLA side HC Lugano in October 2015. He coached the team to an appearance in the NLA finals in his first year, where they were defeated by SC Bern. In 2015 and 2016, he led HCL to the Spengler Cup final, where they fell short to Team Canada twice. On January 16, 2017, Shedden was fired by HC Lugano.

He was appointed as ERC Ingolstadt head coach on December 22, 2017, signing a deal for the remainder of the 2017–18 season with the German DEL team.

In October 2025, Vaasan Sport announced Shedden as their new coach for the 2025–26 Liiga season. Shedden left Vaasan Sport in December and later joined HC Bolzano. He then left Bolzano at the end of the season, joining Milano HC.

== National team coaching ==
During his time at Jokerit, Shedden was also contracted by the Finnish National Team as head coach to replace Erkka Westerlund. Under Shedden's coaching, Finland won the bronze medal in the 2008 World Championships. Shedden's one-year contract ended after 2008 World Championships and he was replaced by his assistant coach, Jukka Jalonen.

He served as assistant coach of Team Canada at the 2009, 2010 and 2011 Spengler Cup. In 2012 and 2013, he was named head coach, guiding Canada to victory in the prestigious tournament in 2012.

Shedden was also a member of Canada's coaching staff at the 2013 IIHF World Championships.

== Career statistics ==
=== Regular season and playoffs ===
			Regular season					Playoffs
Season	Team	League	GP	G	A	Pts	PIM	GP	G	A	Pts	PIM
1977–78	Kitchener Rangers	OMJHL	18	5	7	12	14	—	—	—	—	—
1977–78	Hamilton Fincups	OMJHL	32	1	9	10	32	9	1	2	3	2
1978–79	Kitchener Rangers	OMJHL	66	16	42	58	29	10	3	0	3	6
1979–80	Kitchener Rangers	OMJHL	16	10	16	26	26	—	—	—	—	—
1979–80	Sault Ste. Marie Greyhounds	OMJHL	45	30	44	74	59	—	—	—	—	—
1980–81	Sault Ste. Marie Greyhounds	OHL	66	51	72	123	78	19	16	22	38	10
1981–82	Pittsburgh Penguins	NHL	38	10	15	25	12	—	—	—	—	—
1981–82	Erie Blades	AHL	17	4	6	10	14	—	—	—	—	—
1982–83	Pittsburgh Penguins	NHL	80	24	43	67	54	—	—	—	—	—
1983–84	Pittsburgh Penguins	NHL	67	22	35	57	20	—	—	—	—	—
1984–85	Pittsburgh Penguins	NHL	80	35	32	67	30	—	—	—	—	—
1985–86	Pittsburgh Penguins	NHL	67	32	34	66	32	—	—	—	—	—
1985–86	Detroit Red Wings	NHL	11	2	3	5	2	—	—	—	—	—
1986–87	Detroit Red Wings	NHL	33	6	12	18	6	—	—	—	—	—
1986–87	Adirondack Red Wings	AHL	5	2	2	4	4	—	—	—	—	—
1986–87	Quebec Nordiques	NHL	16	0	2	2	8	—	—	—	—	—
1986–87	Fredericton Express	AHL	15	12	6	18	0	—	—	—	—	—
1987–88	Baltimore Skipjacks	AHL	80	37	51	88	32	—	—	—	—	—
1988–89	Toronto Maple Leafs	NHL	1	0	0	0	2	—	—	—	—	—
1988–89	Newmarket Saints	AHL	29	14	26	40	6	—	—	—	—	—
1989–90	Newmarket Saints	AHL	47	26	33	59	12	—	—	—	—	—
1990–91	Toronto Maple Leafs	NHL	23	8	10	18	10	—	—	—	—	—
1990–91	Newmarket Saints	AHL	47	15	23	38	16	—	—	—	—	—
1991–92	HC Bolzano	ITA	13	6	10	16	16	—	—	—	—	—
1991–92	HC Davos	NLB	7	10	9	19	22	—	—	—	—	—
1992–93	Muskegon Fury	CoHL	21	16	21	37	18	—	—	—	—	—
NHL totals			416	139	186	325	176	—	—	—	—	—

== Coaching statistics ==
			Coaching statistics
Season	Team	League	GP	W	L	T	OTL	Result
1992–93	Wichita Thunder	CHL	34	19	13	2	0	Out of playoffs
1993–94	Wichita Thunder	CHL	64	40	18	2	0	Won Championship
1994–95	Wichita Thunder	CHL	66	44	18	4	0	Won Championship
1995–96	Louisiana IceGators	ECHL	70	43	21	0	6	Lost in round 1
1996–97	Louisiana IceGators	ECHL	70	38	28	4	0	Lost in finals
1997–98	Louisiana IceGators	ECHL	70	43	17	10	0	Lost in round 3
1998–99	Louisiana IceGators	ECHL	70	46	18	6	0	Lost in round 2
1999–00	Flint Generals	UHL	74	51	14	0	9	Won Championship
2000–01	Memphis Riverkings	CHL	70	43	21	0	6	Lost in round 2
2001–02	Memphis Riverkings	CHL	64	46	14	0	4	Won Championship
2002–03	Memphis Riverkings	CHL	64	39	21	0	4	Won Championship
2003–04	St. John's Maple Leafs	AHL	80	32	36	8	4	Out of Playoffs
2004–05	St. John's Maple Leafs	AHL	80	46	28	5	1	Lost in round 1
2005–06	HIFK	SM-liiga	56	28	14	10	4	Lost bronze medal game
2006–07	Jokerit	SM-liiga	56	32	15	6	3	Lost in final
2007–08	Jokerit	SM-liiga	56	29	14			Lost bronze medal game
2007–08	Team Finland	World Championships						Won bronze medal
2008–09	EV Zug	National League						Lost in Semifinals

Sporting positions
Preceded by Gary Fay	Wichita Thunder head coach 1992 - 1995	Succeeded by Don Jackson
Preceded by Erkka Westerlund	Finnish national ice hockey team head coach 2007 – 2008	Succeeded by Jukka Jalonen
Preceded by Curt Lindström	Jokerit head coach 2006 – 2008	Succeeded by Glen Hanlon
Preceded by Pentti Matikainen	HIFK head coach 2005 – 2006	Succeeded by Bob Francis
