= Andreas Holmqvist =

Swedish ice hockey player and coach

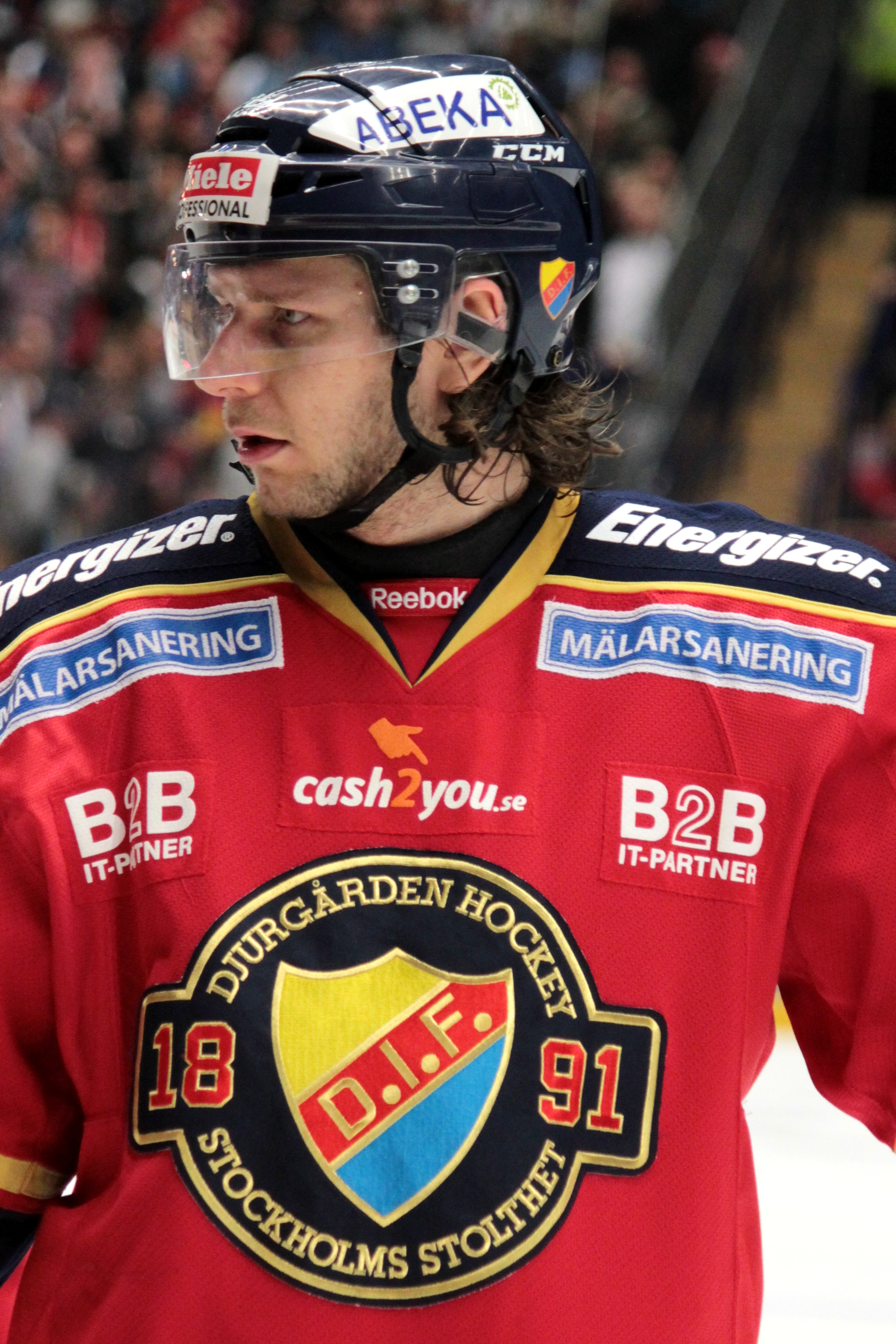
- Born: 23 July 1981 (age 44); Stockholm, Sweden
- Height: 6 ft 4 in (193 cm)
- Weight: 203 lb (92 kg; 14 st 7 lb)
- Position: Defence
- Shot: Right
- Played for: Linköpings HC; Frölunda HC; Djurgårdens IF; Kölner Haie
- National team: Sweden
- NHL draft: 61st overall, 2001; Tampa Bay Lightning
- Playing career: 2000–2015

Per Robert Andreas Holmqvist Pedersen (born 23 July 1981) is a Swedish professional ice hockey coach and former player. He won gold at the 2006 World Championship, while representing Sweden national team.

== Playing career ==
Holmqvist made his debut in men's ice hockey in Sweden's second-division with Hammarby IF in 2000–01. He played for Linköpings HC, Frölunda HC and Djurgårdens IF in the Swedish Elitserien, interrupted by stints in the AHL and ECHL: From 2003 to 2005, he played for the Hamilton Bulldogs, Pensacola Ice Pilots and Springfield Falcons. In 2007 and 2010, Holmqvist made it to the SHL finals with Linköping and Djurgårdens IF respectively.

He signed with Kölner Haie in the Deutsche Eishockey Liga (DEL) in 2012. He reached the DEL finals with Köln in 2013 and 2014 and was named 2013 DEL Player of the Year. He announced his retirement towards the end of the 2014–15 season.

== International play ==
Holmqvist played nine games during the 2006 World Championships en route to winning gold. He also played for Sweden at the 2005–06, 2006–07 and 2007–08 Euro Hockey Tour.

== Coaching career ==
In September 2015, he was named assistant coach of Djurgårdens IF's women's team.

== Personal ==
He is the younger brother of fellow hockey player Michael Holmqvist.

== Career statistics ==
=== Regular season and playoffs ===
			Regular season					Playoffs
Season	Team	League	GP	G	A	Pts	PIM	GP	G	A	Pts	PIM
1999–2000	Hammarby IF	J20	33	8	12	20	16	6	1	2	3	4
2000–01	Hammarby IF	Allsv	37	5	13	18	40	10	1	2	3	6
2001–02	Hammarby IF	Allsv	42	11	13	24	97	—	—	—	—	—
2002–03	Linköpings HC	SEL	43	4	9	13	28	—	—	—	—	—
2003–04	Hamilton Bulldogs	AHL	4	0	0	0	0	—	—	—	—	—
2003–04	Pensacola Ice Pilots	ECHL	63	4	33	37	16	5	0	4	4	0
2004–05	Springfield Falcons	AHL	42	3	9	12	22	—	—	—	—	—
2005–06	Linköpings HC	J20	1	0	0	0	2	—	—	—	—	—
2005–06	Linköpings HC	SEL	46	6	16	22	64	13	1	3	4	24
2006–07	Linköpings HC	SEL	49	7	21	28	54	12	4	5	9	35
2007–08	Frölunda HC	SEL	49	3	23	26	40	4	0	0	0	2
2008–09	Frölunda HC	SEL	7	1	2	3	10	—	—	—	—	—
2008–09	Djurgårdens IF	SEL	35	5	11	16	30	—	—	—	—	—
2009–10	Djurgårdens IF	SEL	51	3	21	24	84	15	3	3	6	12
2010–11	Djurgårdens IF	SEL	48	12	17	29	10	7	0	3	3	2
2011–12	Djurgårdens IF	SEL	40	5	9	14	20	—	—	—	—	—
2012–13	Kölner Haie	DEL	49	11	39	50	30	12	0	12	12	6
2013–14	Kölner Haie	DEL	35	3	18	21	28	17	1	5	6	10
2014–15	Kölner Haie	DEL	32	2	15	17	14	—	—	—	—	—
2018–19	Boo HC 2	SWE.7	2	0	1	1	0	—	—	—	—	—
2018–19	Kalmar HC	SWE.3	17	3	14	17	42	3	0	2	2	2
SEL totals			368	46	129	175	340	51	8	14	22	75

=== International ===
Year	Team	Event	Result	GP	G	A	Pts	PIM
2001	Sweden	WJC	4th	6	0	2	2	4
2006	Sweden	WC	1st place, gold medalist(s)	9	0	1	1	0
Junior totals				6	0	2	2	4
Senior totals				9	0	1	1	0

== Records ==
- Linköpings HC club record for goals in a playoff season, defenceman (4), 2006–07
