= 2005–06 Euro Hockey Tour =

Tournament details
- Dates: 1 September 2005 – 1 May 2006
- Teams: 4

Final positions
- Champions: Russia (2nd title)
- Runners-up: Sweden
- Third place: Finland
- Fourth place: Czech Republic

Tournament statistics
- Games played: 26
- Goals scored: 121 (4.65 per game)
- Attendance: 165,616 (6,370 per game)
- Scoring leader: (Russia) Alexei Mikhnov (7 points)

The 2005–06 Euro Hockey Tour was the tenth season of the Euro Hockey Tour. The season consisted of four tournaments, the Česká Pojišťovna Cup, Karjala Tournament, Rosno Cup, and the LG Hockey Games. The top two teams met in the final, and the third and fourth place teams met for the third place game.

== Standings ==
Pos	Team	Pld	W	OTW	OTL	L	GF	GA	GD	Pts
1	Russia	12	8	0	2	2	40	28	+12	26
2	Sweden	12	6	2	0	4	32	24	+8	22
3	Finland	12	4	2	1	5	22	26	−4	17
4	Czech Republic	12	1	1	2	8	27	43	−16	7

== Česká Pojišťovna Cup ==
The tournament was played between 1–4 September 2005. Five of the matches were played in Liberec, Czech Republic and one match in Moscow, Russia. The tournament was won by Sweden.

Pos	Team	Pld	W	OTW	OTL	L	GF	GA	GD	Pts
1	Sweden	3	3	0	0	0	9	4	+5	9
2	Russia	2	2	0	0	0	7	4	+3	6
3	Czech Republic	1	0	1	0	0	6	8	−2	2
4	Finland	1	0	0	1	0	2	8	−6	1

Source: swehockey

1 September 2005
Czech Republic	2–1 (GWS)	Finland
Russia	1–2	Sweden
3 September 2005
Finland	1–4	Russia
Czech Republic	3–5	Sweden
4 September 2005
Sweden	2–0	Finland
Czech Republic	1-2	Russia

== Karjala Tournament ==
The tournament was played between 10–13 November 2005. Five of the matches were played in Helsinki, Finland and one match in Jönköping, Sweden. The tournament was won by Finland.

Pos	Team	Pld	W	OTW	SOW	OTL	SOL	L	GF	GA	GD	Pts
1	Finland	3	1	0	1	0	0	1	7	9	−2	5
2	Sweden	3	1	1	0	0	0	1	10	7	+3	5
3	Russia	3	1	0	0	1	1	0	9	9	0	5
4	Czech Republic	3	1	0	0	0	0	2	12	13	−1	3

Source: flashscore

10 November 2005
Finland	3–2 (GWS)	Russia
Sweden	6–3	Czech Republic
12 November 2005
Sweden	3–2 (OT)	Russia
Finland	2–6	Czech Republic
13 November 2005
Czech Republic	3–5	Russia
Finland	2-1	Sweden

== Rosno Cup ==
The tournament was played between 15–18 December 2005. Five of the matches were played in Moscow, Russia and one match in Prague, Sweden. The tournament was won by Russia.

Pos	Team	Pld	W	OTW	SOW	OTL	SOL	L	GF	GA	GD	Pts
1	Russia	3	3	0	0	0	0	0	8	2	+6	9
2	Finland	3	1	0	1	0	0	1	5	5	0	5
3	Sweden	3	0	1	0	0	0	2	3	5	−2	2
4	Czech Republic	3	0	0	0	1	1	1	3	7	−4	2

Source: swehockey

15 December 2005
Czech Republic	2–3 (GWS)	Finland
Sweden	1–3	Russia
17 December 2005
Sweden	1–0 (OT)	Czech Republic
Russia	2–0	Finland
18 December 2005
Finland	2–1	Sweden
Russia	3-1	Czech Republic

== LG Hockey Games ==
The tournament was played between 26–29 April 2006. Five of the matches were played in Stockholm, Sweden and one match in Helsinki, Finland. The tournament was won by Russia.

Pos	Team	Pld	W	OTW	SOW	OTL	SOL	L	GF	GA	GD	Pts
1	Russia	3	2	0	0	0	0	1	16	13	+3	6
2	Finland	3	2	0	0	0	0	1	8	4	+4	6
3	Sweden	3	2	0	0	0	0	1	10	8	+2	6
4	Czech Republic	3	0	0	0	0	0	3	6	15	−9	0

Source: swehockey

26 April 2006
Finland	1–3	Russia
Sweden	3–0	Czech Republic
28 April 2006
Czech Republic	1–5	Finland
Sweden	7–6	Russia
29 April 2006
Russia	7–5	Czech Republic
Sweden	0-2	Finland

== Final tournament ==
The EHT finals 2005–06 were played in Globe Arena, Stockholm, Sweden, on 1 May 2006. Russia beat Sweden in the final with 2–1 and won the EHT. Finland won over Czech Republic with 3–2 and clinched the 3rd place.

1 May 2006; 15:30	Finland	3–2 (0-2, 3-0, 0-0)	Czech Republic	Globen, Stockholm, Sweden; Attendance: 1,597

Game reference

	0-1	08:12 – I. Prorok
	0-2	13:29 – J. Balaštík
V. Peltonen – 29:30 (PS)	1-2
J. Hentunen 31:39	2-2
J. Rita – 38:30	3-2

1 May 2006; 19:00	Russia	2–1 (0-0, 2-1, 0-0)	Sweden	Globen, Stockholm, Sweden; Attendance: 4,825

Game reference

E. Malkin – 27:51 (PP)	1-0
	1-1	31:07 – N. Bäckström (PP)
D. Zaripov – 35:23	2-1
