= Filip Pešán =

Czech ice hockey player

Filip Pešán (born January 4, 1978) is a former Czech ice hockey player who played as a striker. He gained fame as a coach. From 2020 to 2022, he was the head coach of the Czech Republic men's national ice hockey team.

His wife is a former Czech skier Lucie Hrstková-Pešánová.
