= Josef Jandač =

Czech ice hockey coach (born 1968)

Josef Jandač (born November 12, 1968, in Beroun) is a Czech ice hockey former coach of the Czech national team.
