= Swiss Ice Hockey Games =

Annual men's international ice hockey competition in Switzerland

- Sport: Ice hockey
- Founded: 2022
- Sports fielded: men's: Switzerland men's national ice hockey team
- No. of teams: 4
- Country: Switzerland
- Continent: Europe
- Sponsor: Swiss International Air Lines
- Website: SIHF

The Swiss Ice Hockey Games (stylized as SWISS Ice Hockey Games after its sponsor) is an annual ice hockey tournament held in Switzerland, as part of the Euro Hockey Tour. It serves as a competitive showcase for the Swiss national men's ice hockey team against top European opponents, including the Czech Republic, Finland and Sweden.

The Swiss Ice Hockey Games was created as a replacement for the Russian Channel One Cup, which was removed (along with the Russian team) from the Euro Hockey Tour due to the Russian invasion of Ukraine in February 2022. The event is organized by the Swiss Ice Hockey Federation (SIHF) and sponsored by Swiss International Air Lines.

== History ==
The Swiss Ice Hockey Games was established in 2022 as the Swiss leg of the Euro Hockey Tour, a series of four-nation tournaments involving the Czech Republic, Finland, Sweden and Switzerland. It replaced the Channel One Cup, which was removed from the Tour in response to the Russian invasion of Ukraine in February the same year, and the sporting sanctions that followed. It has been held annually since, with occasional variations in format and venue due to scheduling or external factors. The event provides the Swiss team with crucial preparation for major competitions such as the IIHF World Championship and the Winter Olympic Games.

In recent years, the tournament has served as a "final rehearsal" for hosting major events. For instance, the 2025 edition is positioned as preparation for the 2026 IIHF World Championship, which Switzerland will co-host.

== Venues ==
The tournament rotates among prominent Swiss ice hockey arenas. Past and upcoming venues include:

- BCF Arena, Fribourg (2022, 2024)
- Swiss Life Arena, Zürich (2023, 2025)

== Results ==
Final standings in each event are determined in a round-robin tournament. If teams are tied in points, the standing is determined by the result of the game between the tied teams.

Year	Winner	Runner-up	3rd place	4th place
2022	Sweden	Czech Republic	Finland	Switzerland
2023	Sweden	Czech Republic	Finland	Switzerland
2024	Czech Republic	Finland	Sweden	Switzerland
2025	Sweden	Czech Republic	Finland	Switzerland
2026	TBD	TBD	TBD	TBD

== Medal table ==
Pos	Team	Gold	Silver	Bronze	Total
1	Sweden	3	0	1	4
2	Czech Republic	1	3	0	4
3	Finland	0	1	3	4
4	Switzerland	0	0	0	4

== See also ==
- Euro Hockey Tour
- Swiss Ice Hockey Federation
- Ice hockey in Switzerland
