= Ivo Prorok =

Czech ice hockey player

- Born: December 28, 1969 (age 55) Karviná, Czechoslovakia
- Height: 6 ft 0 in (183 cm)
- Weight: 176 lb (80 kg; 12 st 8 lb)
- Position: Right wing
- Shot: Right
- Played for: HC Litvínov; HC Slavia Praha; HC Vítkovice; HKM Zvolen; HC Plzeň; Esbjerg Oilers
- National team: Czech Republic
- Playing career: 1988–2014

Ivo Prorok (born December 28, 1969) is a Czech former professional ice hockey left winger.

Prorok played in the Czechoslovak First Ice Hockey League and the Czech Extraliga for HC Litvínov, HC Slavia Praha, HC Vítkovice and HC Plzeň. He also played in the Tipsport Liga in Slovakia for HKM Zvolen and the Oddset Ligaen in Denmark for the Esbjerg Oilers.

Prorok also played for the Czech Republic national ice hockey team and played in the 2006 World Ice Hockey Championships.

== Career statistics ==
			Regular season					Playoffs
Season	Team	League	GP	G	A	Pts	PIM	GP	G	A	Pts	PIM
1988–89	SK Karviná	Czech3	—	—	—	—	—	—	—	—	—	—
1989–90	TJ Tábor	Czech3	—	10	—	—	—	—	—	—	—	—
1990–91	TJ Tábor	Czech3	—	—	—	—	—	—	—	—	—	—
1991–92	HC Litvínov	Czechoslovakia	36	18	15	33	—	9	4	5	9	—
1992–93	HC Litvínov	Czechoslovakia	45	15	20	35	70	—	—	—	—	—
1993–94	HC Litvínov	Czech	39	10	26	36	77	4	0	1	1	2
1994–95	HC Litvínov	Czech	41	17	18	35	40	4	1	2	3	29
1995–96	HC Slavia Praha	Czech	37	14	22	36	50	7	2	3	5	22
1996–97	HC Slavia Praha	Czech	27	7	12	19	86	—	—	—	—	—
1996–97	HC Vitkovice	Czech	17	5	2	7	20	9	1	5	6	8
1997–98	HC Chemopetrol	Czech	50	23	20	43	42	4	1	1	2	4
1998–99	HC Chemopetrol	Czech	46	17	15	32	77	—	—	—	—	—
1999–00	HC Chemopetrol	Czech	40	14	20	34	58	—	—	—	—	—
2000–01	HC Chemopetrol	Czech	7	4	3	7	8	—	—	—	—	—
2000–01	GC Küsnacht Lions	NLB	35	14	31	45	28	1	0	0	0	0
2001–02	HKM Zvolen	Slovak	39	8	11	19	14	—	—	—	—	—
2001–02	HC Chemopetrol	Czech	10	6	4	10	8	—	—	—	—	—
2002–03	HC Chemopetrol	Czech	48	10	16	26	36	—	—	—	—	—
2003–04	HC Chemopetrol	Czech	48	9	18	27	49	—	—	—	—	—
2003–04	HC Plzen	Czech	6	0	0	0	4	3	0	0	0	0
2004–05	Esbjerg Oilers	Denmark	29	10	10	20	24	—	—	—	—	—
2004–05	HC Chemopetrol	Czech	12	3	11	14	8	6	1	4	5	12
2005–06	HC Chemopetrol	Czech	38	10	10	20	69	—	—	—	—	—
2005–06	HC Slavia Praha	Czech	7	2	1	3	10	15	6	2	8	44
2006–07	HC Chemopetrol	Czech	51	9	14	23	70	—	—	—	—	—
2007–08	HC Vitkovice	Czech	22	4	5	9	72	—	—	—	—	—
2008–09	HC Most	Czech2	3	1	1	2	10	—	—	—	—	—
2008–09	HC Slovan Ústečtí Lvi	Czech2	16	2	3	5	18	—	—	—	—	—
2010–11	HC Most	Czech3	29	11	22	33	34	3	0	1	1	6
2012–13	EHC Lenzerheide-Valbella	SwissDiv2	20	12	20	32	30	—	—	—	—	—
2013–14	EHC Lenzerheide-Valbella	SwissDiv2	22	13	15	28	83	—	—	—	—	—
Czech totals			546	164	217	381	784	52	12	18	30	121
