= 2008–09 Euro Hockey Tour =

Tournament details
- Dates: 6 November 2008 – 19 April 2009
- Teams: 4

Final positions
- Champions: Russia (4th title)
- Runners-up: Finland
- Third place: Sweden
- Fourth place: Czech Republic

Tournament statistics
- Games played: 24
- Goals scored: 150 (6.25 per game)
- Attendance: 183,144 (7,631 per game)
- Scoring leader: (Russia) Oleg Saprykin (11 points)

The 2008–09 Euro Hockey Tour was the 13th edition of Euro Hockey Tour. There were four participating teams: Czech Republic, Finland, Russia and Sweden.

== Format ==
The tournament consisted of four stages: Karjala Tournament in Finland, Channel One Cup in Russia, LG Hockey Games in Sweden and Czech Hockey Games in the Czech Republic. The intervals between stages are usually from 1 month to 3 months. In each phase teams played six games.

== Standings ==
Pos	Team	Pld	W	OTW	OTL	L	GF	GA	GD	Pts
1	Russia	12	8	2	0	2	49	28	+21	28
2	Finland	12	3	2	3	4	34	41	−7	16
3	Sweden	12	4	1	1	6	31	38	−7	15
4	Czech Republic	12	3	1	2	6	36	43	−7	13

== Karjala Tournament ==
The tournament was played between 6–9 November 2008. Five of the matches were played in Helsinki, Finland and one match in Moscow, Russia. The tournament was won by Russia.

Pos	Team	Pld	W	OTW	OTL	L	GF	GA	GD	Pts
1	Russia	3	2	1	0	0	8	2	+6	8
2	Czech Republic	3	1	0	2	0	7	6	+1	5
3	Sweden	3	1	0	0	2	3	5	−2	3
4	Finland	3	0	1	0	2	6	11	−5	2

Source: flashscore

6 November 2008
Czech Republic	3–4 (GWS)	Finland
Russia	1–0	Sweden
8 November 2008
Sweden	1–4	Czech Republic
Finland	2–6	Russia
9 November 2008
Russia	1–0 (GWS)	Czech Republic
Finland	0-2	Sweden

== Channel One Cup ==
The tournament was played between 18–21 December 2008. Five of the matches were played in Moscow, Russia and one match in Malmö, Sweden. The tournament was won by Russia.

Pos	Team	Pld	W	OTW	OTL	L	GF	GA	GD	Pts
1	Russia	3	3	0	0	0	15	5	+10	9
2	Finland	3	1	1	0	1	8	7	+1	5
3	Czech Republic	3	1	0	0	2	10	12	−2	3
4	Sweden	3	0	0	1	2	5	14	−9	1

Source: eurohockey

18 December 2008
Sweden	2–6	Czech Republic
Finland	1–4	Russia
20 December 2008
Russia	5–2	Czech Republic
Sweden	1–2 (GWS)	Finland
21 December 2008
Russia	6–2	Sweden
Sweden	2-5	Finland

== LG Hockey Games ==
The tournament was played between 5-8 February 2009. Five of the matches were played in Stockholm, Sweden and one match in Prague, Czech Republic. The tournament was won by Sweden.

Pos	Team	Pld	W	OTW	SOW	OTL	SOL	L	GF	GA	GD	Pts
1	Sweden	3	3	0	0	0	0	0	14	7	+7	9
2	Russia	3	1	0	1	0	0	1	14	11	+3	5
3	Finland	3	1	0	0	0	1	1	9	12	−3	4
4	Czech Republic	3	0	0	0	0	0	3	10	17	−7	0

Source: swehockey

5 February 2009
Czech Republic	3–5	Finland
Russia	3–4	Sweden
7 February 2009
Finland	4–5 (GWS)	Russia
Sweden	6–4	Czech Republic
8 February 2009
Czech Republic	3–6	Russia
Sweden	4-0	Finland

== Czech Hockey Games ==
The tournament was played between 16–19 April 2009. Five of the matches were played in Liberec, Czech Republic and one match in Tampere, Finland. The tournament was won by Russia.

Pos	Team	Pld	W	OTW	OTL	L	GF	GA	GD	Pts
1	Russia	3	2	0	0	1	12	10	+2	6
2	Czech Republic	3	1	1	0	1	9	8	+1	5
3	Finland	3	1	0	2	0	11	11	0	5
4	Sweden	3	0	1	0	2	9	12	−3	2

Source: swehockey

16 April 2009
Sweden	1–2	Czech Republic
Finland	4–2	Russia
18 April 2009
Finland	4–5 (OT)	Sweden
Czech Republic	3–4	Russia
19 April 2009
Russia	6–3	Sweden
Czech Republic	4-3 (OT)	Finland
