= Euro Hockey Tour =

European men's national team ice hockey tournament

- Current season, competition or edition: 2026–27 Euro Hockey Tour; 2026–27 Women's Euro Hockey Tour
- The former EHT logo with the national flags of Czechia, Finland, Russia, and Sweden
- Sport: Ice hockey
- Founded: 1996
- Most recent champion: Sweden (6th title)
- Most titles: Finland; Russia (9 titles each)

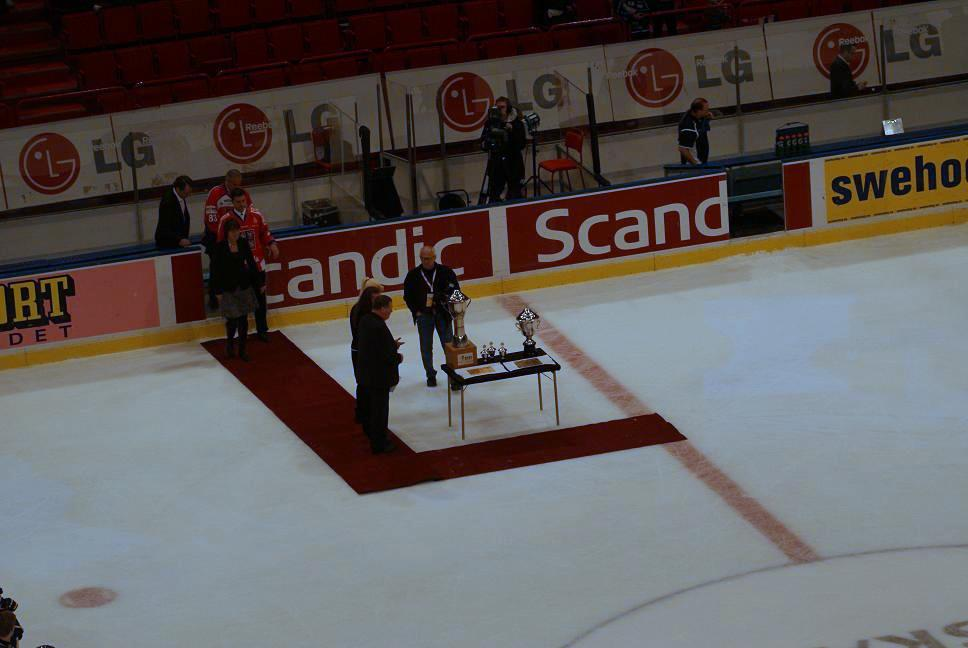
Trophies being awarded from the tournament

The Euro Hockey Tour (EHT) is an annual ice hockey tournament open to national teams of the Czech Republic, Finland, Switzerland and Sweden. The competition is regarded as a preparation for the upcoming World Championships or Olympics, allowing less experienced players to collect valuable ice time in their national colours.

== History ==
=== Tournaments ===
Current

- NOCCO Hockey Games in Finland
- Swiss Ice Hockey Games in Switzerland (replaced the Channel One Cup)
- Beijer Hockey Games in Sweden
- Czech Hockey Games in the Czech Republic

Former

- Channel One Cup in Russia (discontinued following the Russian invasion of Ukraine)

=== Playing format ===
Each team plays three games in each of the tournaments, giving a total of twelve games per team. After the four tournaments have finished, the teams are seeded according to their respective combined point total from all four tournaments.

In each tournament, five games are played in the host city, and one game in another participating country. For example, in the 2007 edition of Karjala Tournament, the game between Sweden and Russia was played in Jönköping, Sweden, rather than in Finland, who host the Karjala Cup. Every country is assigned one home game and one away game in those games.

Each team is given three points for a regulation-time win, two points for an overtime or shootout win, one point for a loss in overtime or shootout, and zero points for a loss in regulation time. In the four tournaments, if two or more teams end with the same number of points, they are seeded based on head-to-head results in games against the tied teams. In the EHT standings however, two or more teams tied in points are seeded based on the better goal difference.

=== Prize money ===
The prize money for the winner of each tournament is €50,000 while the second seed gets €30,000, the third seed gets €25,000, and the fourth seed gets €15,000. The EHT season winner receives another €75,000, the team finishing second gets €30,000, and the team finishing third gets €15,000.

=== Finals in previous years ===
Medal games were not played until the 2003–04 season. Before that, place order was determined by the tournament standings. The seasons 2003–04, 2004–05 and 2006–07 used a format where the first- and second-placed teams played a home-and-home two-game series for the EHT gold and silver medals, while the third- and fourth-placed teams played two games for the bronze. In 2005–06, the championship was determined by a single game played at the home of the first-place team. Since 2007–08, no EHT finals have been played.

== Participating teams ==
Four European teams compete in EHT. The Czech Republic, Finland, and Sweden have participated since the tournament was started in 1996. Switzerland replaced Russia in 2022 after the Russian team was suspended from participation in international tournaments due to the Russian invasion of Ukraine.

- Czech Republic
- Finland
- Switzerland
- Sweden

== Results ==
=== Men ===
#	Season	Winner	Runner-up	3rd place	4th place
1	1996–97 (Note: Only points from Karjala Cup, Izvestija Cup and Swedish Hockey Games counted in the final standings due to that the Russian team did not participate in the Pragobanka Cup.)	Finland	Sweden	Russia	Czech Republic
2	1997–98	Czech Republic	Sweden	Finland	Russia
3	1998–99	Sweden	Finland	Czech Republic	Russia
4	1999–00	Finland	Czech Republic	Russia	Sweden
5	2000–01	Finland	Russia	Sweden	Czech Republic
6	2001–02	Finland	Russia	Sweden	Czech Republic
7	2002–03	Finland	Russia	Czech Republic	Sweden
8	2003–04	Finland	Sweden	Russia	Czech Republic
9	2004–05 (Note: Czech tournament not played due to 2004 World Cup of Hockey.)	Russia	Sweden	Finland	Czech Republic
10	2005–06	Russia	Sweden	Finland	Czech Republic
11	2006–07	Sweden	Russia	Czech Republic	Finland
12	2007–08	Russia	Finland	Czech Republic	Sweden
13	2008–09	Russia	Finland	Sweden	Czech Republic
14	2009–10	Finland	Russia	Czech Republic	Sweden
15	2010–11	Russia	Sweden	Finland	Czech Republic
16	2011–12	Czech Republic	Finland	Russia	Sweden
17	2012–13	Russia	Czech Republic	Finland	Sweden
18	2013–14	Finland	Russia	Czech Republic	Sweden
19	2014–15	Sweden	Finland	Czech Republic	Russia
20	2015–16	Sweden	Finland	Czech Republic	Russia
21	2016–17	Russia	Czech Republic	Finland	Sweden
22	2017–18	Finland	Czech Republic	Russia	Sweden
23	2018–19	Russia	Finland	Sweden	Czech Republic
24	2019–20 (Note: Czech Hockey Games not played due to the COVID-19 pandemic.)	Czech Republic	Sweden	Finland	Russia
25	2020–21	Russia	Czech Republic	Sweden	Finland
26	2021–22	Sweden	Finland	Czech Republic	Russia
27	2022–23	Sweden	Czech Republic	Finland	Switzerland
28	2023–24	Sweden	Finland	Czech Republic	Switzerland
29	2024–25	Czech Republic	Finland	Switzerland	Sweden
30	2025–26	Sweden	Czech Republic	Finland	Switzerland
31	2026–27	TBD	TBD	TBD	TBD

According to the Swedish Ice Hockey Association, the EHT was not officially held in the 2017-2018 season as the countries did not play the same number of games and did not play the same number of times against each other.

According to the source there is no official winner for the 2019-2020 EHT season, as the last tournament in the Czech Republic, originally planned on 30 April-3 May, was postponed to August 2020 due to the Covid-19 pandemic, and later was cancelled.

=== Women ===
1. 2018–19 Euro Hockey Tour (women)
2. 2019–20 Euro Hockey Tour (women): Finland / Sweden / Russia
3. 2022–23 Euro Hockey Tour (women): Finland / Czechia / Sweden
4. 2023–24 Euro Hockey Tour (women): Czechia / Finland / Sweden
5. 2024–25 Women's Euro Hockey Tour: Finland / Czechia / Sweden
6. 2025–26 Women's Euro Hockey Tour: Finland / Czechia / Sweden
7. 2026–27 Women's Euro Hockey Tour:

== Medals ==
=== Men (1996-2026) ===
Rank	Nation	Gold	Silver	Bronze	Total
1	Finland (FIN)	9	10	9	28
2	Russia (RUS)	9	6	5	20
3	Sweden (SWE)	8	7	5	20
4	Czech Republic (CZE)	4	7	10	21
5	Switzerland (SUI)	0	0	1	1
Totals (5 entries)		30	30	30	90

=== Women (2019-2026) ===
Rank	Nation	Gold	Silver	Bronze	Total
1	Finland (FIN)	4	1	0	5
2	Czech Republic (CZE)	1	3	0	4
3	Sweden (SWE)	0	1	4	5
4	Russia (RUS)	0	0	1	1
Totals (4 entries)		5	5	5	15

== See also ==
- Ice Hockey European Championships
- Euro Hockey Challenge
- Nissan Cup
- Deutschland Cup
- Karjala Tournament
