= 2012–13 Euro Hockey Tour =

Tournament details
- Venues: 8 (in 8 host cities)
- Dates: 7 November 2012 – 28 April 2013
- Teams: 4

Final positions
- Champions: Russia (6th title)
- Runners-up: Czech Republic
- Third place: Finland
- Fourth place: Sweden

Tournament statistics
- Games played: 24
- Goals scored: 98 (4.08 per game)
- Attendance: 172,774 (7,199 per game)
- Scoring leader: (Russia) Sergei Mozyakin (8 points)

The 2012–13 Euro Hockey Tour was the 17th season of Euro Hockey Tour. It started on 7 November 2012 and ended on 28 April 2013. A total of 24 games were played, with each team playing 12 games. The season consisted of the Karjala Tournament, the Channel One Cup, the Oddset Hockey Games, and the Kajotbet Hockey Games. Russia won the tournament.

== Format ==
The tournament consisted of four stages: Czech Hockey Games in Czech Republic, Karjala Tournament in Finland, Channel One Cup in Russia and LG Hockey Games in Sweden. The intervals between stages are usually from 1 month to 3 months. In each phase teams played three games.

== Standings ==
Pos	Team	Pld	W	OTW	OTL	L	GF	GA	GD	Pts
1	Russia	12	6	2	1	3	34	20	+14	23
2	Czech Republic	12	6	0	0	6	16	24	−8	18
3	Finland	12	4	1	2	5	25	25	0	16
4	Sweden	12	5	0	0	7	23	29	−6	15

Source: eurohockey

== Karjala Tournament ==
The 2012 Karjala Tournament was played from 7 to 10 November 2012, and was won by the Czech Republic. Five of the matches were played in Turku, Finland, and one match in Prague, Czech Republic.

Pos	Team	Pld	W	OTW	OTL	L	GF	GA	GD	Pts
1	Czech Republic	3	3	0	0	0	6	2	+4	9
2	Finland	3	1	1	0	1	5	3	+2	5
3	Russia	3	1	0	1	1	5	6	−1	4
4	Sweden	3	0	0	0	3	4	9	−5	0

Source: swehockey

7 November 2012
Czech Republic	3–1	Sweden
Russia	1–2 (GWS)	Finland
9 November 2012
Sweden	2–3	Russia
Finland	0–1	Czech Republic
10 November 2012
Czech Republic	2–1	Russia
Finland	3–1	Sweden

== Channel One Cup ==
The 2012 Channel One Cup was played from 13 to 16 December 2012. Five of the matches were played in the Moscow, Russia, and one match in Helsinki, Finland. The tournament was won by Russia.

Pos	Team	Pld	W	OTW	OTL	L	GF	GA	GD	Pts
1	Russia	3	3	0	0	0	14	2	+12	9
2	Sweden	3	2	0	0	1	9	6	+3	6
3	Finland	3	1	0	0	2	5	9	−4	3
4	Czech Republic	3	0	0	0	3	2	13	−11	0

Source: eurohockey

13 December 2012
Finland	3–2	Czech Republic
Sweden	1–5	Russia
15 December 2012
Russia	6–0	Czech Republic
Finland	1–4	Sweden
16 December 2012
Russia	3–1	Finland
Czech Republic	0–4	Sweden

== Oddset Hockey Games ==
The 2013 Oddset Hockey Games were played from 6 to 10 February 2013. Five of the matches were played in Malmö, Sweden, and one match in Saint Petersburg, Russia. Finland won the tournament.

Pos	Team	Pld	W	OTW	OTL	L	GF	GA	GD	Pts
1	Finland	3	2	0	1	0	11	6	+5	7
2	Czech Republic	3	2	0	0	1	4	4	0	6
3	Russia	3	1	1	0	1	9	6	+3	5
4	Sweden	3	0	0	0	3	3	11	−8	0

Source: swehockey

6 February 2013
Russia	4–3 (GWS)	Finland
7 February 2013
Czech Republic	2–0	Sweden
9 February 2013
Finland	3–0	Czech Republic
Sweden	1–4	Russia
10 February 2013
Russia	1–2	Czech Republic
Sweden	2–5	Finland

== Kajotbet Hockey Games ==
The 2013 Kajotbet Hockey Games were played from 25 to 28 April 2013. Five of the matches were played in Brno, Czech Republic, and one match in Jönköping, Sweden. The tournament was won by Sweden.

Pos	Team	Pld	W	OTW	OTL	L	GF	GA	GD	Pts
1	Sweden	3	3	0	0	0	7	3	+4	9
2	Russia	3	1	1	0	1	6	6	0	5
3	Czech Republic	3	1	0	0	2	4	5	−1	3
4	Finland	3	0	0	1	2	4	7	−3	1

Source: swehockey

25 April 2013
Finland	2–3	Czech Republic
Sweden	4–2	Russia
27 April 2013
Czech Republic	0–1	Sweden
Russia	2–1 (GWS)	Finland
28 April 2013
Sweden	2–1	Finland
Czech Republic	1–2	Russia
