= Igor Yemeleyev =

Russian ice hockey player

- Born: 7 March 1981 (age 44) Yaroslavl, Russia
- Height: 5 ft 11 in (180 cm)
- Weight: 196 lb (89 kg; 14 st 0 lb)
- Position: Centre
- Shoots: Right
- KHL team Former teams: Avtomobilist Yekaterinburg; CSKA Moscow; SKA Saint Petersburg; Metallurg Magnitogorsk; Dynamo Moscow; Neftekhimik Nizhnekamsk; HC Ugra; Severstal Cherepovets
- National team: Russia
- NHL draft: Undrafted
- Playing career: 1999–present

Igor Yemeleyev (born 7 March 1981) is a Russian professional ice hockey player who is currently playing with Avtomobilist Yekaterinburg in the Kontinental Hockey League (KHL).

Yemeleyev competed at the 2006 IIHF World Championship as a member of the Russia men's national ice hockey team.
