= 2009–10 Euro Hockey Tour =

14th season of the Euro Hockey Tour

Tournament details
- Dates: 3 September 2009 – 2 May 2010
- Teams: 4

Final positions
- Champions: Finland (7th title)
- Runners-up: Russia
- Third place: Sweden
- Fourth place: Czech Republic

Tournament statistics
- Games played: 24
- Goals scored: 143 (5.96 per game)
- Attendance: 182,026 (7,584 per game)
- Scoring leader: (Finland) Jarkko Immonen (9 points)

2009–10 Euro Hockey Tour was the 14th edition of Euro Hockey Tour. There were four participating teams: Czech Republic, Finland, Russia and Sweden.

== Format ==
The tournament consisted of four stages: Czech Hockey Games in Czech Republic, Karjala Tournament in Finland, Channel One Cup in Russia and LG Hockey Games in Sweden. The intervals between stages are usually from 1 month to 3 months. In each phase teams played three games.

== Standings ==
Pos	Team	Pld	W	OTW	OTL	L	GF	GA	GD	Pts
1	Finland	12	5	2	2	3	41	28	+13	21
2	Russia	12	4	3	3	2	40	36	+4	21
3	Sweden	12	3	3	3	3	32	30	+2	18
4	Czech Republic	12	2	2	2	6	30	49	−19	12

Source: eurohockey

== Czech Hockey Games ==
The tournament was played between 3–6 September 2009. Five of the matches were played in Karlovy Vary, Czech Republic and one match in Podolsk, Russia. The tournament was won by Czech Republic.

Pos	Team	Pld	W	OTW	OTL	L	GF	GA	GD	Pts
1	Czech Republic	3	2	1	0	0	10	4	+6	8
2	Russia	3	1	0	2	0	8	9	−1	5
3	Finland	3	1	0	0	2	10	8	+2	3
4	Sweden	3	0	1	0	2	9	16	−7	2

Source: swehockey

3 September 2009
Czech Republic	2–0	Finland
Russia	3–4 (GWS)	Sweden
5 September 2009
Russia	3–2	Finland
Czech Republic	5–2	Sweden
6 September 2009
Sweden	3–8	Finland
Czech Republic	3–2 (GWS)	Sweden

== Karjala Tournament ==
The tournament was played between 5–8 November 2009. Five of the matches were played in Helsinki, Finland and one match in Jönköping, Sweden. The tournament was won by Russia.

Pos	Team	Pld	W	OTW	SOW	OTL	SOL	L	GF	GA	GD	Pts
1	Russia	3	1	1	1	0	0	0	12	7	+5	7
2	Finland	3	2	0	0	0	1	0	12	5	+7	7
3	Sweden	3	1	0	0	0	0	2	5	14	−9	3
4	Czech Republic	3	0	0	0	1	0	2	7	10	−3	1

Source: eurohockey

5 November 2009
Sweden	4–3	Czech Republic
Russia	4–3 (GWS)	Finland
7 November 2009
Sweden	1–4	Russia
Finland	2–1	Czech Republic
9 November 2009
Czech Republic	3–4 (OT)	Russia
Finland	7–0	Sweden

== Channel One Cup ==
The tournament was played between 17–20 December 2009. Five of the matches were played in Moscow, Russia and one match in Prague, Czech Republic. The tournament was won by Finland.

Pos	Team	Pld	W	OTW	OTL	L	GF	GA	GD	Pts
1	Finland	3	1	1	1	0	8	7	+1	6
2	Russia	3	1	1	0	1	10	9	+1	5
3	Czech Republic	3	0	1	2	0	8	9	−1	4
4	Sweden	3	0	1	1	1	10	11	−1	3

Source: eurohockey

17 December 2009
Czech Republic	2–1 (OT)	Finland
Sweden	3–4)	Russia
19 December 2009
Russia	2–3	Finland
Czech Republic	3–4 (OT)	Sweden
20 December 2009
Russia	4–3 (GWS)	Czech Republic
Finland	4–3 (GWS)	Sweden

== LG Hockey Games ==
The tournament was played between 29 April–2 May 2010. Five of the matches were played in Stockholm, Sweden and one match in Helsinki, Finland. The tournament was won by Finland.

Pos	Team	Pld	W	OTW	SOW	OTL	SOL	L	GF	GA	GD	Pts
1	Finland	3	1	0	1	0	0	1	11	8	+3	5
2	Czech Republic	3	1	0	1	0	0	1	7	7	0	5
3	Russia	3	1	0	0	0	1	1	10	11	−1	4
4	Sweden	3	1	0	0	0	1	1	6	8	−2	4

Source: swehockey

29 April 2010
Finland	5–4 (GWS)	Russia
Czech Republic	2–1 (GWS)	Sweden
1 May 2010
Finland	4–1	Czech Republic
Sweden	2–4	Russia
2 May 2010
Russia	2–4	Czech Republic
Sweden	3-2	Finland
