= 2010–11 Euro Hockey Tour =

Tournament details
- Dates: 11 November 2010 – 24 April 2011
- Teams: 4

Final positions
- Champions: Russia (5th title)
- Runners-up: Sweden
- Third place: Finland
- Fourth place: Czech Republic

Tournament statistics
- Games played: 24
- Goals scored: 135 (5.63 per game)
- Attendance: 193,827 (8,076 per game)
- Scoring leader: (Sweden) Niklas Persson (11 points)

The 2010–11 Euro Hockey Tour was the 15th playing of the Euro Hockey Tour. Four teams played in four tournaments, the Karjala Cup, Channel One Cup, LG Hockey Games, and Czech Hockey Games, for a total of 12 games.

== Format ==
The tournament consisted of four stages: Czech Hockey Games in Czech Republic, Karjala Tournament in Finland, Channel One Cup in Russia and LG Hockey Games in Sweden. The intervals between stages are usually from 1 month to 3 months. In each phase teams played three games.

== Standings ==
Pos	Team	Pld	W	OTW	OTL	L	GF	GA	GD	Pts
1	Russia	12	9	0	0	3	42	31	+11	27
2	Sweden	12	6	1	0	5	39	32	+7	20
3	Finland	12	3	1	2	6	27	33	−6	13
4	Czech Republic	12	3	1	1	7	27	39	−12	12

Source: eurohockey

== Karjala Tournament ==
The tournament was played between 11–14 November 2010. Five of the matches were played in Helsinki, Finland and one match in České Budějovice, Czech Republic. The tournament was won by Finland.

Pos	Team	Pld	W	OTW	OTL	L	GF	GA	GD	Pts
1	Finland	3	2	0	0	1	9	2	+7	6
2	Russia	3	2	0	0	1	6	4	+2	6
3	Sweden	3	2	0	0	1	8	9	−1	6
4	Czech Republic	3	0	0	0	3	4	12	−8	0

Source: eurohockey

11 November 2010
Czech Republic	3–4	Sweden
Russia	1–0	Finland
13 November 2010
Sweden	3–2	Russia
Finland	5–0	Czech Republic
14 November 2010
Czech Republic	1–3	Russia
Finland	4–1	Sweden

== Channel One Cup ==
The tournament was played between 16–19 December 2010. Five of the matches were played in Moscow, Russia and one match in Espoo, Finland. The tournament was won by Russia.

Pos	Team	Pld	W	OTW	OTL	L	GF	GA	GD	Pts
1	Russia	3	3	0	0	0	14	6	+8	9
2	Czech Republic	3	1	1	0	1	8	6	+2	5
3	Sweden	3	1	0	0	2	10	10	0	3
4	Finland	3	0	0	1	2	5	15	−10	1

Source: eurohockey

16 December 2010
Finland	2–3 (GWS)	Czech Republic
Russia	3–5	Finland
18 December 2010
Russia	3–1	Czech Republic
Finland	1–6	Sweden
19 December 2010
Russia	6–2	Finland
Czech Republic	4–1	Sweden

== LG Hockey Games ==
The tournament was played between 10–13 February 2011. Five of the matches were played in Stockholm, Sweden and one match in Mytishchi, Russia. The tournament was won by Sweden.

Pos	Team	Pld	W	OTW	OTL	L	GF	GA	GD	Pts
1	Sweden	3	2	1	0	0	15	5	+10	8
2	Russia	3	2	0	0	1	11	11	0	6
3	Finland	3	0	1	1	1	8	10	−2	3
4	Czech Republic	3	0	0	1	2	5	13	−8	1

Source: eurohockey

10 February 2011
Russia	5–3	Finland
Czech Republic	1–6	Sweden
11 February 2011
Finland	3–2 (OT)	Czech Republic
Sweden	6–2	Russia
12 February 2011
Russia	4–2	Czech Republic
Sweden	3–2 GWS)	Finland

== Czech Hockey Games ==
The tournament was played between 21–24 April 2011. Five of the matches were played in Brno, Czech Republic and one match in Malmö, Sweden. The tournament was won by Czech Republic.

Pos	Team	Pld	W	OTW	OTL	L	GF	GA	GD	Pts
1	Czech Republic	3	2	0	0	1	10	8	+2	6
2	Russia	3	2	0	0	1	11	10	+1	6
3	Finland	3	1	0	0	2	5	6	−1	3
4	Sweden	3	1	0	0	2	6	8	−2	3

Source: swehockey

21 April 2011
Finland	1–2	Czech Republic
Sweden	2–4	Russia
23 April 2011
Czech Republic	6–3	Russia
Sweden	0–2	Finland
24 April 2011
Russia	4–2	Finland
Czech Republic	2–4	Sweden
