= Czechia men's national ice hockey team =

Men's national ice hockey team representing the Czech Republic

Czech Republic
- Association: Czech Ice Hockey Association
- General manager: Patrik Eliáš
- Head coach: Zdeněk Moták
- Assistants: Pavel Gross; Richard Král; Jaroslav Kameš
- Captain: Roman Červenka
- Most games: Roman Červenka (233)
- Top scorer: Roman Červenka (67)
- Most points: Roman Červenka (171)
- Home stadium: O2 Arena
- Team colors
- IIHF code: CZE

Ranking
- Current IIHF: NR (3 June 2026)
- Highest IIHF: 1 (2024)
- Lowest IIHF: 8 (2023)

First international
- Czech Republic 6–1 Russia (Stockholm, Sweden; 11 February 1993)

Biggest win
- Czech Republic 11–0 Italy (Hanover, Germany; 6 May 2001)

Biggest defeat
- Finland 7–0 Czech Republic (Stockholm, Sweden; 11 February 2012)

Olympics
- Appearances: 9 (first in 1994)
- Medals: Gold: (1998); Bronze: (2006)

IIHF World Championships
- Appearances: 33 (first in 1993)
- Best result: Gold: (1996, 1999, 2000, 2001, 2005, 2010, 2024)

World Cup
- Appearances: 3 (first in 1996)
- Best result: 3rd: (2004)

International record (W–L–T)
- 552–364–42

Medal record

Olympic Games
Gold medal – first place	1998 Nagano	Team
Bronze medal – third place	2006 Turin	Team

World Championship
Gold medal – first place	1996 Austria	
Gold medal – first place	1999 Norway	
Gold medal – first place	2000 Russia	
Gold medal – first place	2001 Germany	
Gold medal – first place	2005 Austria	
Gold medal – first place	2010 Germany	
Gold medal – first place	2024 Czechia	
Silver medal – second place	2006 Latvia	
Bronze medal – third place	1993 Germany	
Bronze medal – third place	1997 Finland	
Bronze medal – third place	1998 Switzerland	
Bronze medal – third place	2011 Slovakia	
Bronze medal – third place	2012 Finland/Sweden	
Bronze medal – third place	2022 Finland	

The Czech Republic men's national ice hockey team is the national ice hockey team of the Czech Republic. Since 2021, the team has been officially known in English as Czechia. It is one of the most successful national ice hockey teams in history and a member of the so-called "Big Six", the unofficial group of the six strongest men's ice hockey nations, along with Canada, Finland, Russia, Sweden and the United States. It is governed by the Czech Ice Hockey Association. The Czech Republic has 85,000 male players officially enrolled in organized hockey (0.8% of its population).

== History ==
The Czech national team was formed following the breakup of Czechoslovakia, as the country was split into the Czech Republic and Slovakia. The Czech Republic was recognized as the successor to the Czechoslovakia team and retained in the highest pool (A), while Slovakia was required to start international play in pool C. See also Post-Cold War period of the IIHF world championships.

The Czechs won the gold medal at the 1998 Winter Olympics. In 2024, the team was recognized with the IIHF Milestone Award, given by the International Ice Hockey Federation to a team that made a significant contribution to the development of international hockey. The 1998 Olympic hockey tournament was also the first the include National Hockey League players. The IIHF reported the gold medal to be "the most important event in the country's history after the 1968 Uprising".

The Czechs won three straight gold medals at the world championships from 1999 to 2001. In the next three years, the team did not get a medal at the world championships—not even home at the 2004 Men's World Ice Hockey Championships held in Prague and Ostrava, thus keeping the "world championship home ice curse" alive. The following year, however, the Czechs won gold at the 2005 tournament, the only world championship where, due to the 2004–05 NHL lockout, all NHL players were available to participate.

At the 2006 Winter Olympics, the Czechs won a bronze medal, defeating Russia 3–0 (roster) in the bronze medal game. At the 2006 Men's World Ice Hockey Championships, the Czechs earned silver, falling to Sweden in the final, the only time the Czechs have lost the final game of the tournament. The Czech Republic won the 2010 World Championships in Germany. For the first time in history, the Czech Republic did not qualify for the quarterfinals at the 2022 Winter Olympics and finished in ninth place, their lowest placement in history. However, they won a bronze medal at the 2022 IIHF World Championship later the same year, ending its longest medal drought in IIHF tournaments history, which had lasted since 2012. In 2023, the Czech Republic finished in eighth place at the World Championship, which is the worst placement in history. At the 2024 IIHF World Championship, they ended their 14-year gold drought after winning it for the first time since 2010, also as hosts.

== Tournament record ==
=== Olympic Games ===
Games	GP	W	OW	T	OL	L	GF	GA	Coach	Captain	Finish	Rank
1920–1992	As part of Czechoslovakia											
(Norway) 1994 Lillehammer	8	5	0	0	0	3	30	18	Ivan Hlinka	Otakar Janecký	5th place match	5th
(Japan) 1998 Nagano	6	5	0	0	0	1	19	6	Ivan Hlinka	Vladimír Růžička	Champions	1st place, gold medalist(s)
(United States) 2002 Salt Lake City	4	1	0	1	0	2	12	8	Josef Augusta	Jaromír Jágr	Quarter-finals	7th
(Italy) 2006 Turin	8	4	0	0	0	4	23	20	Alois Hadamczik	Robert Lang	Bronze Medal Game	3rd place, bronze medalist(s)
(Canada) 2010 Vancouver	4	2	1	–	0	2	13	11	Vladimír Růžička	Patrik Eliáš	Quarter-finals	7th
(Russia) 2014 Sochi	5	2	0	–	0	3	13	15	Alois Hadamczik	Tomáš Plekanec	Quarter-finals	6th
(South Korea) 2018 Pyeongchang	6	2	2	–	0	2	16	15	Josef Jandač	Martin Erat	Bronze Medal Game	4th
(China) 2022 Beijing	4	0	2	–	0	2	11	12	Filip Pešán	Roman Červenka	Playoffs	9th
(Italy) 2026 Milan / Cortina d'Ampezzo	5	2	0	–	2	1	15	18	Radim Rulík	Roman Červenka	Quarter-finals	8th
(France) 2030 French Alps	Future event											

=== World Championship ===
Championship	GP	W	OW	T	OL	L	GF	GA	Coach	Captain	Finish	Rank
1920 – 1992	As part of Czechoslovakia											
(Germany) 1993 Munich, Dortmund	8	6	–	1	1	0	33	10	Ivan Hlinka	Otakar Janecký	Bronze medal game	3rd place, bronze medalist(s)
(Italy) 1994 Bolzano, Canazei and Milan	6	1	–	2	–	3	17	20	Ivan Hlinka	Otakar Janecký	Quarterfinal	7th
(Sweden) 1995 Stockholm, Gävle	8	4	–	0	–	4	17	16	Luděk Bukač	Jiří Kučera	Bronze medal game	4th
(Austria) 1996 Vienna	8	7	–	1	–	0	42	15	Luděk Bukač	Robert Reichel	Champions	1st place, gold medalist(s)
(Finland) 1997 Helsinki, Tampere, Turku	9	6	–	0	–	3	30	20	Ivan Hlinka	Robert Reichel	Bronze medal game	3rd place, bronze medalist(s)
(Switzerland) 1998 Basel, Zürich	9	6	–	2	–	1	33	16	Ivan Hlinka	Robert Reichel	Bronze medal game	3rd place, bronze medalist(s)
(Norway) 1999 Oslo, Hamar, Lillehammer	12	9	–	0	–	3	46	24	Ivan Hlinka	Pavel Patera	Champions	1st place, gold medalist(s)
(Russia) 2000 St. Petersburg	9	8	0	0	0	1	41	19	Josef Augusta	Robert Reichel	Champions	1st place, gold medalist(s)
(Germany) 2001 Nuremberg, Cologne, Hanover	9	6	2	1	0	0	37	13	Josef Augusta	Robert Reichel	Champions	1st place, gold medalist(s)
(Sweden) 2002 Gothenburg, Karlstad, Jönköping	7	6	0	0	0	1	31	17	Josef Augusta	Jaromír Jágr	Quarterfinal	5th
(Finland) 2003 Helsinki, Tampere, Turku	9	6	0	1	0	2	36	21	Slavomír Lener	Robert Reichel	Bronze medal game	4th
(Czech Republic) 2004 Prague, Ostrava	7	6	0	0	1	0	28	8	Slavomír Lener	Martin Straka	Quarterfinal	5th
(Austria) 2005 Vienna, Innsbruck	9	8	0	0	0	1	25	9	Vladimír Růžička	David Výborný	Champions	1st place, gold medalist(s)
(Latvia) 2006 Riga	9	4	1	2	0	2	26	24	Alois Hadamczik	David Výborný	Final	2nd place, silver medalist(s)
(Russia) 2007 Moscow	7	3	0	–	1	3	23	19	Alois Hadamczik	David Výborný	Quarterfinal	7th
(Canada) 2008 Quebec City, Halifax	7	3	1	–	2	1	29	19	Alois Hadamczik	Tomáš Kaberle	Quarterfinal	5th
(Switzerland) 2009 Bern, Kloten	7	4	0	–	0	3	26	14	Vladimír Růžička	Marek Židlický	Quarterfinal	6th
(Germany) 2010 Cologne, Mannheim, Gelsenkirchen	9	5	2	–	0	2	25	16	Vladimír Růžička	Tomáš Rolinek	Champions	1st place, gold medalist(s)
(Slovakia) 2011 Bratislava, Košice	9	8	0	–	0	1	36	18	Alois Hadamczik	Tomáš Rolinek	Bronze medal game	3rd place, bronze medalist(s)
(Finland) (Sweden) 2012 Helsinki, Stockholm	10	6	1	–	0	3	32	19	Alois Hadamczik	Tomáš Plekanec	Bronze medal game	3rd place, bronze medalist(s)
(Sweden) (Finland) 2013 Stockholm, Helsinki	8	3	1	–	0	4	20	14	Alois Hadamczik	Jiří Novotný	Quarterfinal	7th
(Belarus) 2014 Minsk	10	3	2	–	2	3	24	27	Vladimír Růžička	Tomáš Rolinek	Bronze medal game	4th
(Czech Republic) 2015 Prague, Ostrava	10	5	1	–	1	3	32	26	Vladimír Růžička	Jakub Voráček	Bronze medal game	4th
(Russia) 2016 Moscow, St. Petersburg	8	5	1	–	2	0	27	12	Vladimír Vůjtek	Tomáš Plekanec	Quarterfinal	5th
(France) (Germany) 2017 Paris, Cologne	8	3	2	–	0	3	23	17	Josef Jandač	Jakub Voráček	Quarterfinal	7th
(Denmark) 2018 Copenhagen, Herning	8	3	3	–	0	2	29	18	Josef Jandač	Roman Červenka	Quarterfinal	7th
(Slovakia) 2019 Bratislava, Košice	10	7	0	–	1	2	47	23	Miloš Říha	Jakub Voráček	Bronze medal game	4th
2020	Cancelled due to the coronavirus pandemic											
(Latvia) 2021 Riga	8	3	2	–	0	3	27	19	Filip Pešán	Jan Kovář	Quarterfinal	7th
(Finland) 2022 Helsinki, Tampere	10	6	0	–	1	3	32	24	(Finland) Kari Jalonen	Roman Červenka	Bronze medal game	3rd place, bronze medalist(s)
(Finland) (Latvia) 2023 Tampere, Riga	8	4	0	–	1	3	22	19	(Finland) Kari Jalonen	Roman Červenka	Quarterfinal	8th
(Czech Republic) 2024 Prague, Ostrava	10	7	1	–	2	0	36	17	Radim Rulík	Roman Červenka	Champions	1st place, gold medalist(s)
(Sweden) (Denmark) 2025 Stockholm, Herning	8	5	1	–	0	2	37	19	Radim Rulík	Roman Červenka	Quarterfinal	6th
(Switzerland) 2026 Zurich, Fribourg	8	4	0	–	1	3	20	21	Radim Rulík	Roman Červenka	Quarterfinal	5th
(Germany) 2027 Düsseldorf, Mannheim	Future event											

=== World Cup of Hockey ===
Year	GP	W	OW	T	OL	L	GF	GA	Coach	Captain	Finish	Rank
1996	3	0	–	0	–	3	4	17	Luděk Bukač	Jaromír Jágr	Round 1	8th
2004	5	2	0	0	1	2	19	15	Vladimír Růžička	Robert Reichel	Semi-finals	3rd
2016	3	1	0	–	1	1	6	12	Josef Jandač	Tomáš Plekanec	Group stage	6th

=== Euro Hockey Tour ===
Year	GP	W	OW	T	OL	L	GF	GA	Rank
1996–97	9	0	–	2	–	7	15	36	4th
1997–98	12	7	–	2	–	3	47	29	1st place, gold medalist(s)
1998–99	12	3	–	5	–	4	28	27	3rd place, bronze medalist(s)
1999–00	12	7	–	1	–	4	31	20	2nd place, silver medalist(s)
2000–01	12	3	1	–	3	5	27	29	4th
2001–02	12	3	2	–	1	6	34	36	4th
2002–03	12	4	1	–	3	4	33	33	3rd place, bronze medalist(s)
2003–04	12	2	4	–	3	3	24	28	3rd place, bronze medalist(s)
2004–05	11	2	2	1	3	3	28	33	4th
2005–06	13	1	1	–	2	9	29	46	4th
2006–07	14	2	2	–	2	8	33	42	3rd place, bronze medalist(s)
2007–08	12	4	1	–	1	6	33	44	3rd place, bronze medalist(s)
2008–09	12	3	1	–	2	6	36	43	4th
2009–10	12	3	2	3	1	3	31	27	4th
2010–11	12	3	1	–	1	7	27	39	4th
2011–12	12	5	2	–	1	4	31	29	1st place, gold medalist(s)
2012–13	12	6	0	–	0	6	16	24	2nd place, silver medalist(s)
2013–14	12	4	1	–	1	6	16	31	3rd place, bronze medalist(s)
2014–15	12	4	1	–	2	5	33	31	3rd place, bronze medalist(s)
2015–16	12	4	2	–	0	6	32	37	3rd place, bronze medalist(s)
2016–17	12	6	0	–	1	5	43	39	2nd place, silver medalist(s)
2017–18	12	6	1	–	0	5	32	31	2nd place, silver medalist(s)
2018–19	12	4	1	–	0	7	30	34	4th
2019–20	9	3	3	–	1	2	25	19	1st place, gold medalist(s)
2020–21	12	5	1	–	2	4	30	29	2nd place, silver medalist(s)
2021–22	12	5	0	–	2	5	33	32	3rd place, bronze medalist(s)
2022–23	12	4	2	–	2	4	26	33	2nd place, silver medalist(s)
2023–24	12	5	1	–	0	6	31	32	3rd place, bronze medalist(s)
2024–25	12	8	0	–	0	4	36	27	1st place, gold medalist(s)
2025–26	12	5	0	–	1	6	26	33	2nd place, silver medalist(s)

== Team ==
=== Current roster ===
Roster for the 2026 IIHF World Championship.

Head coach: Radim Rulík

No.	Pos.	Name	Height	Weight	Birthdate	Team
6	D	Michal Kempný	1.83 m (6 ft 0 in)	89 kg (196 lb)	8 September 1990 (age 36)	(Sweden) Brynäs IF
8	F	Ondřej Beránek	1.84 m (6 ft 0 in)	90 kg (200 lb)	21 December 1995 (age 30)	(Czech Republic) HC Energie Karlovy Vary
10	F	Roman Červenka – C	1.81 m (5 ft 11 in)	88 kg (194 lb)	10 December 1985 (age 40)	(Czech Republic) HC Dynamo Pardubice
11	F	Matyáš Melovský	1.87 m (6 ft 2 in)	90 kg (200 lb)	25 May 2004 (age 22)	(United States) Utica Comets
12	F	Jiří Černoch	1.79 m (5 ft 10 in)	93 kg (205 lb)	1 September 1996 (age 30)	(Czech Republic) HC Energie Karlovy Vary
17	D	Filip Hronek – A	1.83 m (6 ft 0 in)	85 kg (187 lb)	2 November 1997 (age 29)	(Canada) Vancouver Canucks
18	F	Dominik Kubalík	1.87 m (6 ft 2 in)	86 kg (190 lb)	21 August 1995 (age 31)	(Switzerland) EV Zug
19	F	Jakub Flek	1.73 m (5 ft 8 in)	78 kg (172 lb)	24 December 1992 (age 33)	(Czech Republic) Kometa Brno
23	F	Lukáš Sedlák – A	1.84 m (6 ft 0 in)	94 kg (207 lb)	25 February 1993 (age 33)	(Czech Republic) HC Dynamo Pardubice
24	D	Jan Ščotka	1.87 m (6 ft 2 in)	91 kg (201 lb)	20 May 1996 (age 30)	(Czech Republic) HC Kometa Brno
26	D	Jiří Ticháček	1.75 m (5 ft 9 in)	77 kg (170 lb)	30 January 2003 (age 23)	(Finland) Oulun Kärpät
27	D	Marek Alscher	1.90 m (6 ft 3 in)	93 kg (205 lb)	7 April 2004 (age 22)	(United States) Florida Panthers
32	G	Josef Kořenář	1.86 m (6 ft 1 in)	86 kg (190 lb)	31 January 1998 (age 28)	(Czech Republic) HC Sparta Praha
39	G	Dominik Pavlát	1.87 m (6 ft 2 in)	80 kg (180 lb)	11 November 1999 (age 27)	(Finland) Ilves
49	F	Jaroslav Chmelař	1.93 m (6 ft 4 in)	103 kg (227 lb)	20 July 2003 (age 23)	(United States) New York Rangers
55	D	Libor Hájek	1.91 m (6 ft 3 in)	95 kg (209 lb)	4 February 1998 (age 28)	(Czech Republic) HC Dynamo Pardubice
60	G	Petr Kváča	1.86 m (6 ft 1 in)	89 kg (196 lb)	12 September 1997 (age 29)	(Czech Republic) HC Bílí Tygři Liberec
61	F	Martin Kaut	1.88 m (6 ft 2 in)	86 kg (190 lb)	2 October 1999 (age 27)	(Czech Republic) HC Dynamo Pardubice
65	D	Tomáš Cibulka	1.83 m (6 ft 0 in)	77 kg (170 lb)	2 April 2004 (age 22)	(Czech Republic) Motor České Budějovice
79	D	Tomáš Galvas	1.79 m (5 ft 10 in)	76 kg (168 lb)	11 February 2006 (age 20)	(Czech Republic) HC Bílí Tygři Liberec
81	F	Matěj Blümel	1.83 m (6 ft 0 in)	93 kg (205 lb)	31 May 2000 (age 26)	(United States) Providence Bruins
87	F	Michal Kovařčík	1.84 m (6 ft 0 in)	80 kg (180 lb)	19 November 1996 (age 29)	(Czech Republic) HC Oceláři Třinec
89	F	Jan Mandát	1.84 m (6 ft 0 in)	88 kg (194 lb)	18 November 1995 (age 30)	(Czech Republic) HC Dynamo Pardubice
95	F	Daniel Voženílek	1.90 m (6 ft 3 in)	101 kg (223 lb)	10 February 1996 (age 30)	(Switzerland) EV Zug
96	F	David Tomášek	1.88 m (6 ft 2 in)	95 kg (209 lb)	10 February 1996 (age 30)	(Sweden) Färjestad BK

=== 2026 Olympics roster ===
The first six players of Czechia's roster were announced on 16 June 2025. The remaining roster was named on 6 January 2026. On 7 February, Pavel Zacha was ruled out due to injury, with Filip Chlapík named as his replacement. On 8 February, Roman Červenka was named Czechia's captain, with Radko Gudas and David Pastrňák serving as alternate captains.

Head coach: Radim Rulík

No.	Pos.	Name	Height	Weight	Birthdate	Team
1	G	Lukáš Dostál	1.85 m (6 ft 1 in)	86 kg (190 lb)	22 June 2000 (aged 25)	(United States) Anaheim Ducks
3	D	Radko Gudas – A	1.83 m (6 ft 0 in)	94 kg (207 lb)	30 June 1990 (aged 35)	(United States) Anaheim Ducks
6	D	Michal Kempný	1.83 m (6 ft 0 in)	89 kg (196 lb)	8 September 1990 (aged 35)	(Sweden) Brynäs IF
7	D	David Špaček	1.83 m (6 ft 0 in)	86 kg (190 lb)	18 February 2003 (aged 22)	(United States) Iowa Wild
10	F	Roman Červenka – C	1.80 m (5 ft 11 in)	88 kg (194 lb)	10 December 1985 (aged 40)	(Czech Republic) Dynamo Pardubice
12	F	Radek Faksa	1.91 m (6 ft 3 in)	98 kg (216 lb)	9 January 1994 (aged 32)	(United States) Dallas Stars
14	F	Filip Chlapík	1.88 m (6 ft 2 in)	96 kg (212 lb)	3 June 1997 (aged 28)	(Czech Republic) Sparta Praha
17	D	Filip Hronek	1.83 m (6 ft 0 in)	85 kg (187 lb)	2 November 1997 (aged 28)	(Canada) Vancouver Canucks
18	F	Ondřej Palát	1.78 m (5 ft 10 in)	93 kg (205 lb)	28 March 1991 (aged 34)	(United States) New York Islanders
19	F	Jakub Flek	1.73 m (5 ft 8 in)	78 kg (172 lb)	24 December 1992 (aged 33)	(Czech Republic) Kometa Brno
23	F	Lukáš Sedlák	1.83 m (6 ft 0 in)	98 kg (216 lb)	25 February 1993 (aged 32)	(Czech Republic) Dynamo Pardubice
26	D	Jiří Ticháček	1.75 m (5 ft 9 in)	77 kg (170 lb)	30 January 2003 (aged 23)	(Finland) Oulun Kärpät
44	D	Jan Rutta	1.91 m (6 ft 3 in)	93 kg (205 lb)	29 July 1990 (aged 35)	(Switzerland) Genève-Servette HC
48	F	Tomáš Hertl	1.91 m (6 ft 3 in)	97 kg (214 lb)	12 November 1993 (aged 32)	(United States) Vegas Golden Knights
50	G	Karel Vejmelka	1.93 m (6 ft 4 in)	102 kg (225 lb)	25 May 1996 (aged 29)	(United States) Utah Mammoth
51	D	Radim Šimek	1.83 m (6 ft 0 in)	93 kg (205 lb)	20 September 1992 (aged 33)	(Czech Republic) Bílí Tygři Liberec
64	F	David Kämpf	1.88 m (6 ft 2 in)	90 kg (198 lb)	12 January 1995 (aged 31)	(Canada) Vancouver Canucks
70	G	Daniel Vladař	1.96 m (6 ft 5 in)	95 kg (209 lb)	20 August 1997 (aged 28)	(United States) Philadelphia Flyers
73	F	Ondřej Kaše	1.83 m (6 ft 0 in)	85 kg (187 lb)	8 November 1995 (aged 30)	(Czech Republic) HC Litvínov
81	F	Dominik Kubalík	1.88 m (6 ft 2 in)	86 kg (190 lb)	21 August 1995 (aged 30)	(Switzerland) EV Zug
84	D	Tomáš Kundrátek	1.88 m (6 ft 2 in)	91 kg (201 lb)	26 December 1989 (aged 36)	(Czech Republic) Oceláři Třinec
88	F	David Pastrňák – A	1.83 m (6 ft 0 in)	90 kg (198 lb)	26 May 1996 (aged 29)	(United States) Boston Bruins
93	F	Matěj Stránský	1.93 m (6 ft 4 in)	98 kg (216 lb)	11 July 1993 (aged 32)	(Switzerland) HC Davos
96	F	David Tomášek	1.88 m (6 ft 2 in)	95 kg (209 lb)	10 February 1996 (aged 30)	(Sweden) Färjestad BK
98	F	Martin Nečas	1.88 m (6 ft 2 in)	88 kg (194 lb)	15 January 1999 (aged 27)	(United States) Colorado Avalanche

=== Retired numbers ===
- 4 – Karel Rachůnek
- 15 – Jan Marek
- 63 – Josef Vašíček

=== Coaching history ===
Olympics

- 1994 and 1998 – Ivan Hlinka
- 2002 – Josef Augusta
- 2006 – Alois Hadamczik
- 2010 – Vladimír Růžička
- 2014 – Alois Hadamczik
- 2018 – Josef Jandač
- 2022 – Filip Pešán
- 2026 – Radim Rulík

World Championships

- 1993–1994 – Ivan Hlinka
- 1995–1996 – Luděk Bukač
- 1997–1999 – Ivan Hlinka
- 2000–2002 – Josef Augusta
- 2003–2004 – Slavomír Lener
- 2005 – Vladimír Růžička
- 2006–2008 – Alois Hadamczik
- 2009–2010 – Vladimír Růžička
- 2011–2013 – Alois Hadamczik
- 2014–2015 – Vladimír Růžička
- 2016 – Vladimír Vůjtek
- 2017–2018 – Josef Jandač
- 2019 – Miloš Říha
- 2021 – Filip Pešán
- 2022–2023 – Kari Jalonen
- 2024–2026 – Radim Rulík

== Uniform evolution ==
National team jerseys

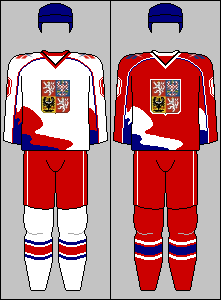
1994 Olympic jerseys

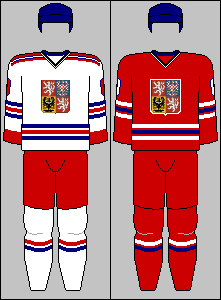
IIHF jerseys 1996–1998

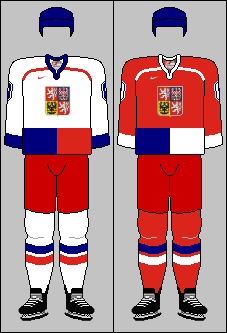
IIHF jerseys 1998–2002

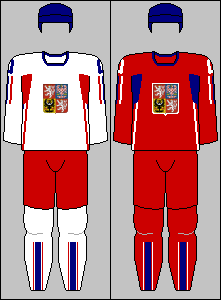
2006 IIHF jerseys

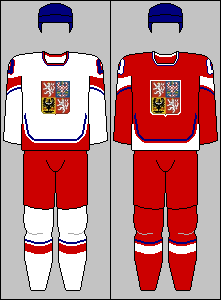
2009 IIHF jerseys

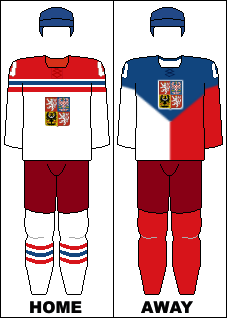
2014 Olympic jerseys

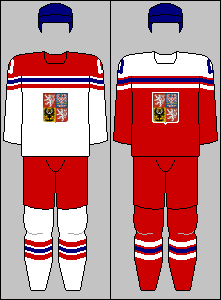
2015–2019 IIHF jerseys

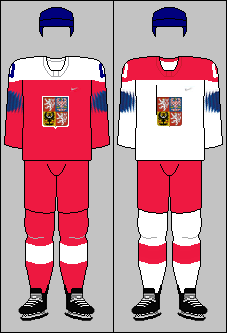
2018 Olympic jerseys

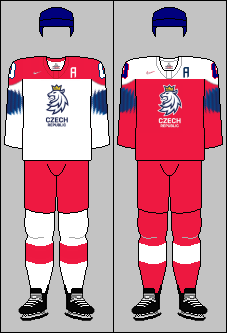
2019–2021 IIHF jerseys

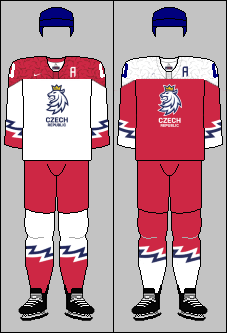
2021 IIHF jerseys

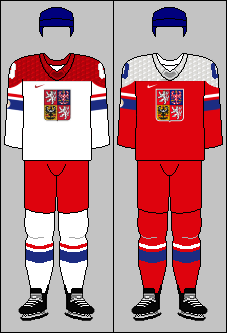
2022 Olympic jerseys

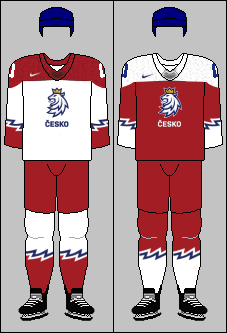
2022–2023 IIHF jerseys

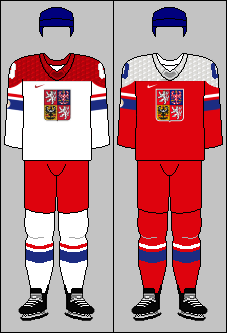
2024 IIHF Jerseys

== See also ==
- Bohemia national ice hockey team
- Czechoslovak national ice hockey team
- Protectorate of Bohemia and Moravia men's national ice hockey team
