= 2011 Channel One Cup =

Tournament details
- Host countries: Russia; Czechia
- Cities: Moscow; Chomutov
- Venues: 2 (in 2 host cities)
- Dates: 15–18 December 2011
- Teams: 4

Final positions
- Champions: Sweden (3rd title)
- Runners-up: Czech Republic
- Third place: Russia
- Fourth place: Finland

Tournament statistics
- Games played: 6
- Goals scored: 32 (5.33 per game)
- Attendance: 52,225 (8,704 per game)
- Scoring leader(s): (Sweden) Staffan Kronwall (Russia) Alexander Radulov (4 points)

Awards
- MVP: (Czech Republic) Zbyněk Irgl

The 2011 Channel One Cup was the Channel One Cup tournament played between 15 and 18 December 2011, during the 2011 European Trophy playoffs. The Czech Republic, Finland, Sweden and Russia played a round-robin for a total of three games per team and six games in total. Five of the matches were played in the Megasport Arena in Moscow, Russia, and one match in the ČEZ Stadion Chomutov in Chomutov, Czech Republic. Sweden won the tournament, which was part of 2011–12 Euro Hockey Tour.

== Standings ==
Pos	Team	Pld	W	OTW	OTL	L	GF	GA	GD	Pts
1	Sweden	3	2	0	0	1	9	7	+2	6
2	Czech Republic	3	1	1	0	1	10	6	+4	5
3	Russia	3	1	0	1	1	8	8	0	4
4	Finland	3	1	0	0	2	5	11	−6	3

Source: eurohockey

== Games ==
All times are local. Moscow – (Moscow Time – UTC+4) Chomutov – (Central European Time – UTC+1).

15 December 2011; 18:30	Czech Republic	1–2 (1–0, 0–2, 0–0)	Sweden	ČEZ Stadion Chomutov, Chomutov; Attendance: 5,225

Game reference

Jakub Štěpánek
Goalies
Viktor Fasth
Referees:
(Finland) Tom Laaksonen
(Finland) Petri Tuomisto

P. Průcha – 00:05	1–0
	1–1	29:49 – D. Axelsson (C. Söderberg, T. Viklund)
	1–2	34:33 – N. Persson (M. Ritola, S. Kronwall)

6 min
Penalties
6 min
24
Shots
28

15 December 2011; 20:00	Finland	0–3 (0–1, 0–0, 0–2)	Russia	Megasport Arena, Moscow; Attendance: 14,000

Game reference

Teemu Lassila
Goalies
Konstantin Barulin
Referees:
(Czech Republic) Vladimir Sindler
(Czech Republic) Milan Minar

0–1	16:02 – I. Nikulin (S. Shirokov, A. Radulov)
0–2	42:40 – D. Kokarev (E. Bodrov)
0–3	55:46 – V. Schipachev (V. Tarasenko)

35 min
Penalties
35 min
19
Shots
31

17 December 2011; 14:00	Russia	2–4 (0–1, 1–1, 1–2)	Sweden	Megasport Arena, Moscow; Attendance: 14,000

Game reference

Konstantin Barulin
Goalies
Viktor Fasth
Referees:
(Czech Republic) Milan Minar
(Czech Republic) Vladimir Sindler

	0–1	10:17 – (PP) S. Kronwall (J. Andersson, N. Persson)
	0–2	25:15 – S. Kronwall (R. Rosén)
S. Shirokov (A. Radulov) (PP) – 30:39	1–2
N. Zherdev (A. Radulov) (PP) – 43:59	2–2
	2–3	44:59 – D. Axelsson (C. Söderberg, M. Karlsson)
	2–4	49:44 – S. Kronwall (M. Johansson)

8 min
Penalties
26 min
25
Shots
27

17 December 2011; 18:00	Czech Republic	5–1 (2–1, 1–0, 2–0)	Finland	Megasport Arena, Moscow; Attendance: 3,500

Game reference

Tomáš Pöpperle
Goalies
Mikko Koskinen
Referees:
(Russia) Alexey Ravodin
(Russia) Anatoly Zakharov

J. Krejčík (P. Vrana) – 07:44	1–0
Z. Irgl (P. Hubáček) – 14:25	2–0
	2–1	18:14 – (PP) O. Osala (T. Kiiskinen)
Z. Irgl (M. Vondrka) (SH) – 22:16	3–1
P. Vrana (L. Krajíček) (PP) – 49:20	4–1
P. Vrana (L. Krajíček) – 51:21	5–1

18 min
Penalties
24 min
23
Shots
23

18 December 2011; 14:00	Russia	3–4 GWS (1–1, 2–1, 0–1) (OT: 0–0) (SO: 0–1)	Czech Republic	Megasport Arena, Moscow; Attendance: 14,000

Game reference

Mikhail Biryukov
Goalies
Jakub Štěpánek
Referees:
(Sweden) Mikael Sjöqvist
(Sweden) Morgan Johansson

	0–1	00:31 – R. Červenka
N. Zherdev (D. Kalinin, E. Biryukov) (PP) – 07:25	1–1
A. Tereshchenko (A. Perezhogin) – 21:31	2–1
	2–2	30:27 – (PP) R. Červenka (J. Nakládal, L. Kašpar)
A. Radulov – 33:30	3–2
	3–3	47:09 – T. Rolinek (P. Průcha, O. Němec)

N. Zherdev (miss)
A. Radulov
V. Schipachev (miss)
A. Radulov
A. Radulov (miss)
Shootout
Z. Irgl
(miss) P. Průcha
(miss) R. Červenka
Z. Irgl
Z. Irgl
4 min
Penalties
8 min
32
Shots
34

18 December 2011; 18:00	Sweden	3–4 (1–1, 1–2, 1–1)	Finland	Megasport Arena, Moscow; Attendance: 1,500

Game reference

Joacim Eriksson
Goalies
Teemu Lassila
Referees:
(Russia) Vyacheslav Bulanov
(Russia) Konstantin Olenin

P. Zackrisson (C. Söderberg, D. Axelsson) (PP) – 05:56	1–0
	1–1	18:36 – V. Uusitalo (P. Wirtanen)
J. Andersson (M. Ekholm) – 21:08	2–1
	2–2	22:13 – T. Kiiskinen (M. Kuparinen, M. Kousa)
	2–3	36:05 – (PP) M. Kousa (I. Heikkinen, T. Kiiskinen)
	2–4	58:14 – H. Pesonen (J. Enlund)
M. Ekholm – 59:05	3–4

10 min
Penalties
22 min
23
Shots
35

== Scoring leaders ==
Pos	Player	Country	GP	G	A	Pts	+/−	PIM	POS
1	Staffan Kronwall	Sweden	3	3	1	4	+1	2	D
2	Alexander Radulov	Russia	3	1	3	4	+2	25	F
3	Zbynek Irgl	Czech Republic	3	3	0	3	+1	2	F
4	Petr Vrána	Czech Republic	3	2	1	3	0	0	F
5	Dick Axelsson	Sweden	3	2	1	3	-2	2	F

GP = Games played; G = Goals; A = Assists; Pts = Points; +/− = Plus/minus; PIM = Penalties in minutes; POS = Position
quanthockey

== Goaltending leaders ==
Pos	Player	Country	TOI	GA	GAA	Sv%	SO
1	Viktor Fasth	Sweden	120:00	3	1.50	93.88	0
2	Konstantin Barulin	Russia	119:19	4	2.01	90.70	1
3	Jakub Štěpánek	Czech Republic	123:48	5	2.42	91.94	0
4	Teemu Lassila	Finland	118:35	6	3.04	88.46	0

TOI = Time on ice (minutes:seconds); SA = Shots against; GA = Goals against; GAA = Goals Against Average; Sv% = Save percentage; SO = Shutouts
Source: swehockey

== Tournament awards ==
Best players selected by the directorate:

- Best Goaltender: (Sweden) Viktor Fasth
- Best Defenceman: (Sweden) Staffan Kronwall
- Best Forward: (Russia) Alexander Radulov
- Top Scorer: (Sweden) Staffan Kronwall (3 goals, 1 assist)
- Most Valuable Player: (Czech Republic) Zbyněk Irgl
