= 2012 Channel One Cup =

Tournament details
- Host countries: Russia; Finland
- Cities: Moscow; Helsinki
- Venues: 2 (in 2 host cities)
- Dates: 13–16 December 2012
- Teams: 4

Final positions
- Champions: Russia (14th title)
- Runners-up: Sweden
- Third place: Finland
- Fourth place: Czech Republic

Tournament statistics
- Games played: 6
- Goals scored: 30 (5 per game)
- Attendance: 53,405 (8,901 per game)
- Scoring leader: (Russia) Pavel Datsyuk (7 points)

The 2012 Channel One Cup was the Channel One Cup tournament played between 13 and 16 December 2012. The Czech Republic, Finland, Sweden and Russia played a round-robin for a total of three games per team and six games in total. Five of the matches were played in the Mytishchi Arena in Moscow, Russia, and one match in the Helsinki Halli in Helsinki, Finland. The tournament was part of 2012–13 Euro Hockey Tour. The tournament was won by Russia.

== Standings ==
Pos	Team	Pld	W	OTW	OTL	L	GF	GA	GD	Pts
1	Russia	3	3	0	0	0	14	2	+12	9
2	Sweden	3	2	0	0	1	9	6	+3	6
3	Finland	3	1	0	0	2	5	9	−4	3
4	Czech Republic	3	0	0	0	3	2	13	−11	0

Source: eurohockey

== Games ==
All times are local. Moscow – (Moscow Time – UTC+3) Helsinki – (Eastern European Time – UTC+1)

13 December 2012; 18:30	Finland	3-2 (0-1, 2-0, 1-1)	Czech Republic	Helsinki Halli, Helsinki; Attendance: 7,805

Game reference

Ari Ahonen
Goalies
Alexander Salak
Referees:
(Sweden) Mikael Nord
(Sweden) Mikael Sjöqvist

	0-1	00:26 – Kutlák (Frolik, Plekanec)
Osala (Viitaluoma) – 22:38	1-1
Pihlström (Osala) (SHG) – 35:28	2-1
Ramstedt (Mäenpää, Kiiskinen) – 53:41	3-1
	3-2	59:20 – Hemsky (Nedvěd, Plekanec) (PP/EA)

8 min
Penalties
12 min
32
Shots
23

13 December 2012; 20:00	Sweden	1-5 (1-0, 0-4, 0-1)	Russia	Mytishchi Arena, Moscow; Attendance: 14,000

Game reference

Anders Lindbäck
Goalies
Konstantin Barulin
Referees:
(Finland) Jari Leppäalho
(Finland) Aleksei Rantala

Danielsson (Kronwall, Bäckström) (PP) – 10:09	1-0
	1-1	20:53 – Medvedev (Datsyuk)
	1-2	31:24 – Mozyakin (Malkin, Biryukov) (PP)
	1-3	32:43 – Ovechkin (Tereshchenko, Tyutin)
	1-4	34:12 – Radulov (Datsyuk, Kovalchuk)
	1-5	40:13 – Mozyakin (Nikulin)

12 min
Penalties
16 min
27
Shots
18

15 December 2012; 14:00	Russia	6-0 (2-0, 2-0, 2-0)	Czech Republic	Mytishchi Arena, Moscow; Attendance: 14,000

Game reference

Vasily Koshechkin
Goalies
Ondrej Pavelec Alexander Salak
Referees:
(Finland) Aleksei Rantala
(Finland) Jari Leppäalho

Radulov (Yemelin, Datsyuk) – 08:09	1-0
Datsyuk (Kovalchuk) – 16:09	2-0
Mozyakin (Ovechkin, Malkin) (PP) – 24:13	3-0
Datsyuk (Radulov, Kovalchuk) – 27:45	4-0
Malkin (Mozyakin) – 49:08	5-0
Datsyuk - 50:15	6-0

10 min
Penalties
8 min
25
Shots
29

15 December 2012; 18:00	Finland	1-4 (0-2, 0-0, 1-2)	Sweden	Mytishchi Arena, Moscow; Attendance: 1,500

Game reference

Joni Ortio
Goalies
Jhonas Enroth
Referees:
(Russia) Vyacheslav Bulanov
(Russia) Konstantin Olenin

	0-1	03:04 – Pettersson (Lundqvist, Persson)
	0-2	04:41 – Persson (Lundqvist)
Mäenpää (Ramstedt) (PP) – 52:36	1-2
	1-3	57:53 – Danielsson (Berglund)
	1-4	59:37 – Hedman (Viklund) (EN)

6 min
Penalties
8 min
23
Shots
23

16 December 2012; 14:00	Russia	3-1 (0-0, 2-1, 1-0)	Finland	Mytishchi Arena, Moscow; Attendance: 14,000

Game reference

Konstantin Barulin
Goalies
Ari Ahonen
Referees:
(Czech Republic) Vladimir Sindler
(Czech Republic) Jan Hribik

Shipachyov (Datsyuk, Kovalchuk) – 28:35	1-0
Malkin (Mozyakin, Kulyomin) (PP) – 30:25	2-0
	2-1	35:47 – Mäenpää (Näkyvä, Pihlström) (PP)
Kovalchuk (Shipachyov, Datsyuk) – 41:06	3-1

6 min
Penalties
12 min
23
Shots
31

16 December 2013; 18:00	Czech Republic	0-4 (0-1, 0-1, 0-2)	Sweden	Mytishchi Arena, Moscow; Attendance: 2,100

Game reference

Alexander Salak
Goalies
Jhonas Enroth
Referees:
(Russia) Sergei Kulakov
(Russia) Roman Gofman

0-1	05:39 – Johansson (Bäckström)
0-2	36:29 – Johansson (Viklund, Hedman)
0-3	43:17 – Söderberg (Stålberg)
0-4	58:18 – Lundqvist (Persson, Pettersson)

10 min
Penalties
10 min
33
Shots
27

== Scoring leaders ==
Pos	Player	Country	GP	G	A	Pts	+/−	PIM	POS
1	Pavel Datsyuk	Russia	3	3	5	8	+8	0	F
2	Sergei Mozyakin	Russia	3	3	2	5	+2	2	F
3	Ilya Kovalchuk	Russia	3	1	4	5	+8	0	F
4	Evgeni Malkin	Russia	3	2	2	4	+2	2	F
5	Alexander Radulov	Russia	3	2	1	3	+7	4	F

GP = Games played; G = Goals; A = Assists; Pts = Points; +/− = Plus/minus; PIM = Penalties in minutes; POS = Position
Source: quanthockey

== Goaltending leaders ==
Pos	Player	Country	TOI	GA	GAA	Sv%	SO
1	Jhonas Enroth	Sweden	120:00	1	0.50	98.21	1
2	Konstantin Barulin	Russia	120:00	2	1.00	96.55	0
3	Ari Ahonen	Finland	117:12	5	2.56	89.13	0
4	Alexander Salák	Czech Republic	118:41	9	3.60	87.76	0

TOI = Time on ice (minutes:seconds); SA = Shots against; GA = Goals against; GAA = Goals Against Average; Sv% = Save percentage; SO = Shutouts
Source: swehockey
