= 2019 Channel One Cup =

Tournament details
- Host countries: Russia; Czechia
- Cities: Moscow; Plzeň
- Venues: 2 (in 2 host cities)
- Dates: 13–15 December 2019
- Teams: 5

Final positions
- Champions: Sweden (5th title)
- Runners-up: Russia
- Third place: Finland
- Fourth place: Czech Republic

Tournament statistics
- Games played: 6
- Goals scored: 33 (5.5 per game)
- Attendance: 112,179 (18,697 per game)
- Scoring leader(s): (Russia) Vadim Shipachev (Finland) Jesse Puljujärvi (4 points)

The 2019 Channel One Cup was played between 12 and 15 December 2019. Czech Republic, Finland, Sweden and Russia played in the tournament. One match was played in Plzeň, Czech Republic, one game in Saint Petersburg and the rest was played in CSKA Arena in Moscow, Russia . The tournament was part of 2019–20 Euro Hockey Tour. It was won by Sweden.

== Standings ==
Pos	Team	Pld	W	OTW	OTL	L	GF	GA	GD	Pts
1	Sweden	3	2	0	0	1	8	8	0	6
2	Russia	3	1	1	0	1	9	7	+2	5
3	Finland	3	1	0	1	1	8	7	+1	4
4	Czech Republic	3	0	1	1	1	8	10	−2	3

Source: eurohockey

== Games ==
All times are local. Moscow/Saint Petersburg – (Eastern European Time – UTC+2) Plzeň – (Central European Time – UTC+1)

12 December 2019; 18:30	Czech Republic	4-3 OT (3-1, 0-0, 0-2) (OT: 1–0)	Finland	CSKA Arena, Moscow; Attendance: 6,988

Game reference

Roman Will
Goalies
Eetu Laurikainen
Referees:
(Sweden) Linus Öhlund
(Sweden) Mikael Sjöqvist

Zatovic (Gulas) (PP) – 05:54	1-0
Sekac (Tomášek) – 09:44	2-0
	2-1	12:04 – Björninen (Karjalainen, Seppälä)
Sedlak (Moravčík, Nestrasil) – 17:10	3-1
	3-2	51:30 – Lammikko (Puljujärvi)
	3-3	59:12 – Savinainen (Kemiläinen, Puljujärvi)
Sedlak – 60:23	4-3

4 min
Penalties
2 min
27
Shots
26

12 December 2019; 20:00	Russia	3-4 (0-2, 1-1, 2-1)	Sweden	Logspeed CZ Aréna, Plzeň; Attendance: 11,719

Game reference

Alexander Samonov Ilya Sorokin
Goalies
Lars Johansson
Referees:
(Finland) Lassi Heikkinen
(Finland) Kristian Vikman

	0-1	03:56 – Petersson (Pääjärvi-Svensson, Johansson) (PP)
	0-2	11:43 – Brodin (Händemark)
	0-3	21:51 – Strömwall (Hansson)
Shipachyov (Kuzmenko, Mironov) – 36:24	1-3
Kaprizov (Rafikov, Grigorenko) – 51:40	2-3
	2-4	52:19 – Zaar (Johansson, Rasmussen)
Kaprizov (Shipachyov, Slepyshev) (PP) – 53:57	3-4

6 min
Penalties
10 min
42
Shots
16

14 December 2019; 11:00	Finland	5-1 (0-0, 2-1, 3-0)	Sweden	CSKA Arena, Moscow; Attendance: 4,718

Game reference

Frans Tuohimaa
Goalies
Adam Reideborn
Referees:
(Russia) Sergey Morozov
(Russia) Ivan Fateev

	0-1	23:37 – Brodin (Lööv, Sylvegård)
Puljujärvi (Aaltonen, Ikonen) (PP) – 29:28	1-1
Karjalainen (Kemiläinen, Aaltonen) (PP) – 36:41	2-1
Aaltonen (Nättinen, Puljujärvi) – 53:52	3-1
Puustinen (Nättinen, Palmu) – 57:23	4-1
Tuohimaa (EN) – 58:42	5-1

8 min
Penalties
10 min
25
Shots
35

14 December 2019; 15:00	Russia	4-3 GWS () (OT: 0–0) (SO: 1–0)	Czech Republic	CSKA Arena, Moscow; Attendance: 11,699

Game reference

Ilya Sorokin
Goalies
Šimon Hrubec
Referees:
(Finland) Lassi Heikkinen
(Finland) Kristian Vikman

Kuzmenko (Lyamkin) – 02:09	1-0
Grigorenko (Voynov, Shipachyov) – 17:44	2-0
	2-1	21:43 – Sedlak (Jaskin, Krejcik)
	2-2	35:24– Filipp (Sekac, Zatovic)
	2-3	46:28 – Zohorna (Zohorna, Klok)
Ozhiganov (Tkachyov) – 48:48	3-3

Tkachyov
Shootout

6 min
Penalties
6 min
26
Shots
35

15 December 2019; 14:00	Sweden	3-1 (0-0, 2-0, 1-1)	Czech Republic	CSKA Arena, Moscow; Attendance: 9,178

Game reference

Lars Johansson
Goalies
Marek Langhamer
Referees:
(Russia) Sergey Morozov
(Russia) Ivan Fateev

Rasmussen (Johansson, Lööv) – 20:47	1-0
Strömwall (Tömmernes, Petersson) (PP) – 26:50	2-0
	2-1	48:41 – Zohorna (Jerabek, Filippi) (PP)
Rasmussen (EN) – 59:34	3-1

6 min
Penalties
2 min
23
Shots
26

15 December 2019; 16:00	Russia	2-0 (1-0, 0-0, 1-0)	Finland	Gazprom Arena, Saint Petersburg; Attendance: 67,877

Game reference
Ilya Sorokin	Goalies	Frans Tuohimaa	Referees: (Czech Republic) Robin Sir (Czech Republic) Daniel Prazak
Slepyshev (Voynov, Shipachyov) – 01:53 / 1-0; Slepyshev – 57:57 / 2-0			Referees: (Czech Republic) Robin Sir (Czech Republic) Daniel Prazak
2 min	Penalties	0 min	Referees: (Czech Republic) Robin Sir (Czech Republic) Daniel Prazak
17	Shots	25	Referees: (Czech Republic) Robin Sir (Czech Republic) Daniel Prazak

== Scoring leaders ==
Pos	Player	Country	GP	G	A	Pts	+/−	PIM	POS
1	Vadim Shipachev	Russia	3	1	3	4	+2	2	F
2	Jesse Puljujärvi	Finland	3	1	3	4	+2	0	F
3	Lukas Sedlak	Czech Republic	3	3	0	3	+1	2	F
4	Anton Slepyshev	Russia	3	2	1	3	+1	0	F
5	Dennis Rasmussen	Sweden	3	2	1	3	+2	0	F

GP = Games played; G = Goals; A = Assists; Pts = Points; +/− = Plus/minus; PIM = Penalties in minutes; POS = Position
Source: quanthockey

== Goaltending leaders ==
Pos	Player	Country	TOI	GA	GAA	Sv%	SO
1	Frans Tuohimaa	Finland	118:20	3	1.52	94.23	0
2	Lars Johansson	Sweden	120:00	4	2.00	94.12	0
3	Ilya Sorokin	Russia	161:15	4	1.49	94.03	1

TOI = Time on ice (minutes:seconds); SA = Shots against; GA = Goals against; GAA = Goals Against Average; Sv% = Save percentage; SO = Shutouts
Source: swehockey
