= 1996 Izvestia Trophy =

1996 Baltika Cup
Tournament details
- Host country: Russia
- City: Moscow
- Venue: 1 (in 1 host city)
- Dates: 16–22 December 1996
- Teams: 5

Final positions
- Champions: Sweden (1st title)
- Runners-up: Russia
- Third place: Finland
- Fourth place: Czech Republic

Tournament statistics
- Games played: 10
- Goals scored: 52 (5.2 per game)
- Scoring leader: (Russia) Alexander Korolyuk (6 points)

Awards
- MVP: (Russia) Alexander Korolyuk

The 1996 Izvestia Trophy was the 29th Izvestia Trophy competition, played between 16 and 22 December 1996. The Czech Republic, Finland, Sweden and Russia played a round-robin for a total of three games per team and six games in total. All of the matches were played in Luzhniki Palace of Sports in Moscow, Russia. Russia won the tournament. The tournament was part of the 1996–97 Euro Hockey Tour.

Games against Canada was not included in the 1996–97 Euro Hockey Tour.

== Standings ==
Pos	Team	Pld	W	D	L	GF	GA	GD	Pts
1	Sweden	4	3	1	0	14	6	+8	10
2	Russia	4	3	0	1	13	5	+8	9
3	Finland	4	2	0	2	13	9	+4	6
4	Czech Republic	4	1	1	2	9	12	−3	4
5	Canada	4	0	0	4	3	20	−17	0

Source: swehockey

== Games ==
All times are local. Moscow – (Moscow Time – UTC+4)

16 December 1996; 13:00	Canada	1-5 (1-0, 2-1, 2-0)	Sweden	Luzhniki Palace of Sports, Moscow

16 December 1996; 16:30	Russia	3-1 (2-1, 1-0, 0-0)	Finland	Luzhniki Palace of Sports, Moscow

17 December 1996; 13:00	Finland	6-1 (2-0, 3-0, 1-1)	Canada	Luzhniki Palace of Sports, Moscow

17 December 1996; 16:30	Russia	3-1 (0-0, 0-1, 3-0)	Czech Republic	Luzhniki Palace of Sports, Moscow

18 December 1996; 16:30	Sweden	3-3 (0-2, 2-1, 1-0)	Czech Republic	Luzhniki Palace of Sports, Moscow

19 December 1996; 13:00	Sweden	3-1 (0-0, 3-1, 0-0)	Finland	Luzhniki Palace of Sports, Moscow

19 December 1996; 16:30	Russia	6-0 (2-0, 1-0, 3-0)	Canada	Luzhniki Palace of Sports, Moscow

20 December 1996; 16:30	Czech Republic	3-1 (1-0, 0-0, 2-1)	Canada	Luzhniki Palace of Sports, Moscow

21 December 1996; 11:00	Finland	5-2 (2-2, 2-0, 1-0)	Czech Republic	Luzhniki Palace of Sports, Moscow

21 December 1996; 15:00	Russia	1-3 (0-0, 0-2, 1-1)	Sweden	Luzhniki Palace of Sports, Moscow

== Scoring leaders ==
Pos	Player	Country	GP	G	A	Pts	PIM	POS
1	Alexander Korolyuk	Russia	4	4	2	6	2	F
2	Mika Alatalo	Finland	4	3	1	4	6	F
3	Johan Lindbom	Sweden	4	3	1	4	4	F
3	Kimmo Rintanen	Finland	4	3	1	4	2	F
5	Per Svartvadet	Sweden	4	2	2	4	0	F

GP = Games played; G = Goals; A = Assists; Pts = Points; +/− = Plus/minus; PIM = Penalties in minutes; POS = Position
Source: quanthockey

== Tournament awards ==
The tournament directorate named the following players in the tournament 1997:

- Best goaltender: (Russia) Maxim Mikhailovsky
- Best defenceman: (Finland) Marko Kiprusoff
- Best forward: (Sweden) Patrik Kjellberg
- Most Valuable Player: (Russia) Alexander Korolyuk
