= 1996–97 Euro Hockey Tour =

Tournament details
- Dates: 7 November 1996 – 9 February 1997
- Teams: 4

Final positions
- Champions: Finland (1st title)
- Runners-up: Sweden
- Third place: Russia
- Fourth place: Czech Republic

Tournament statistics
- Games played: 15
- Goals scored: 99 (6.6 per game)
- Attendance: 53,699 (3,580 per game)

The 1996–97 Euro Hockey Tour was the first season of the Euro Hockey Tour. The season consisted of three tournaments, the Karjala Tournament, Channel One Cup, and the Sweden Hockey Games. The games Canada participated in did not count towards the final standings of the tournament.

== Standings ==
| Pos | Team | Pld | W | D | L | GF | GA | GD | Pts |
|---|---|---|---|---|---|---|---|---|---|
| 1 | Finland | 9 | 6 | 1 | 2 | 36 | 17 | +19 | 13 |
| 2 | Sweden | 9 | 6 | 1 | 2 | 29 | 21 | +8 | 13 |
| 3 | Russia | 9 | 4 | 0 | 5 | 19 | 25 | −6 | 8 |
| 4 | Czech Republic | 9 | 0 | 2 | 7 | 15 | 36 | −21 | 2 |

Source: hokej

== Karjala Tournament ==
The tournament was played between 6–9 November 1996. All of the matches were played in Helsinki, Finland. The tournament was won by Finland.

| Pos | Team | Pld | W | D | L | GF | GA | GD | Pts |
|---|---|---|---|---|---|---|---|---|---|
| 1 | Finland | 3 | 2 | 1 | 0 | 15 | 6 | +9 | 5 |
| 2 | Sweden | 3 | 2 | 0 | 1 | 9 | 8 | +1 | 4 |
| 3 | Russia | 3 | 1 | 0 | 2 | 5 | 11 | −6 | 2 |
| 4 | Czech Republic | 3 | 0 | 1 | 2 | 5 | 9 | −4 | 1 |

Source: hokej

7 November 1996
| Czech Republic | 1–3 | Sweden |
| Finland | 6–1 | Russia |
9 November 1996
| Sweden | 4–1 | Russia |
| Finland | 3–3 | Czech Republic |
10 November 1996
| Czech Republic | 1–3 | Russia |
| Finland | 6–2 | Sweden |

== Izvestia Trophy ==
The tournament was played between 16–22 December 1996. All of the matches were played in Moscow, Russia. The tournament was won by Sweden.

| Pos | Team | Pld | W | D | L | GF | GA | GD | Pts |
|---|---|---|---|---|---|---|---|---|---|
| 1 | Sweden | 4 | 3 | 1 | 0 | 14 | 6 | +8 | 10 |
| 2 | Russia | 4 | 3 | 0 | 1 | 13 | 5 | +8 | 9 |
| 3 | Finland | 4 | 2 | 0 | 2 | 13 | 9 | +4 | 6 |
| 4 | Czech Republic | 4 | 1 | 1 | 2 | 9 | 12 | −3 | 4 |
| 5 | Canada | 4 | 0 | 0 | 4 | 3 | 20 | −17 | 0 |

Source: swehockey

16 December 1996
| Canada | 1–5 | Sweden |
| Russia | 3–1 | Finland |
17 December 1996
| Finland | 6–1 | Canada |
| Russia | 3–1 | Czech Republic |
18 December 1996
| Sweden | 3–3 | Czech Republic |
19 December 1996
| Sweden | 3–1 | Finland |
| Russia | 6–0 | Canada |
20 December 1996
| Czech Republic | 3–1 | Canada |
21 December 1996
| Finland | 5–2 | Czech Republic |
| Russia | 1–3 | Sweden |

== Sweden Hockey Games ==
The tournament was played between 4–9 February 1997. All of the matches were played in Stockholm, Sweden. The tournament was won by Finland.

| Pos | Team | Pld | W | D | L | GF | GA | GD | Pts |
|---|---|---|---|---|---|---|---|---|---|
| 1 | Finland | 4 | 4 | 0 | 0 | 18 | 5 | +13 | 12 |
| 2 | Sweden | 4 | 2 | 0 | 2 | 12 | 10 | +2 | 6 |
| 3 | Russia | 4 | 1 | 1 | 2 | 8 | 10 | −2 | 4 |
| 4 | Canada | 4 | 1 | 1 | 2 | 6 | 8 | −2 | 4 |
| 5 | Czech Republic | 4 | 1 | 0 | 3 | 6 | 17 | −11 | 3 |

Source: swehockey

4 February 1997
| Finland | 5–1 | Russia |
| Sweden | 1–2 | Canada |
5 February 1997
| Russia | 1–1 | Canada |
| Finland | 5–0 | Czech Republic |
6 February 1997
| Sweden | 6–3 | Czech Republic |
7 February 1997
| Finland | 4–2 | Canada |
| Sweden | 3–1 | Russia |
8 February 1997
| Czech Republic | 5–1 | Canada |
9 February 1997
| Russia | 5–1 | Czech Republic |
| Sweden | 2–4 | Finland |
