= 2016 Channel One Cup =

Tournament details
- Host countries: Russia; Finland
- Cities: Moscow; Helsinki
- Venues: 2 (in 2 host cities)
- Dates: 15–18 December 2016
- Teams: 4

Final positions
- Champions: Sweden (4th title)
- Runners-up: Russia
- Third place: Finland
- Fourth place: Czech Republic

Tournament statistics
- Games played: 6
- Goals scored: 34 (5.67 per game)
- Attendance: 50,854 (8,476 per game)
- Scoring leader: (Finland) Miro Aaltonen (5 points)

The 2016 Channel One Cup was played between 15 and 18 December 2016. The Czech Republic, Finland, Sweden and Russia played a round-robin for a total of three games per team and six games in total. Five of the matches were played in the VTB Ice Palace in Moscow, Russia, and one match in the Helsingin jäähalli in Helsinki, Finland. The tournament was part of 2016–17 Euro Hockey Tour. Tournament was won by Sweden.

== Standings ==
Pos	Team	Pld	W	OTW	OTL	L	GF	GA	GD	Pts
1	Sweden	3	2	0	0	1	8	7	+1	6
2	Russia	3	2	0	0	1	10	7	+3	6
3	Finland	3	1	0	0	2	9	10	−1	3
4	Czech Republic	3	1	0	0	2	7	10	−3	3

Source: EHT

== Games ==
All times are local. Moscow – (Moscow Time – UTC+3) Helsingfors – (Central European Time – UTC+1)

15 December 2016; 18:30	Russia	1–3 (1–0, 0–1, 0–2)	Sweden	VTB Ice Palace, Moscow; Attendance: 11,770

Game reference

Ilya Sorokin
Goalies
Viktor Fasth

(S. Shumakov) V. Gavrikov (PP1) – 08:56	1–0
	1–1	27:56 – O. Lindblom
	1–2	58:34 – S. Bertilsson (L. Omark)
	1–3	59:49 – (EN) A. Thuresson

4 min
Penalties
6 min
22
Shots
34

15 December 2016; 19:00	Czech Republic	2–4 (0–2, 1–2, 1–0)	Finland	Helsinki Ice Hall, Helsinki; Attendance: 5,056

Game reference

Pavel Francouz
Goalies
Joni Ortio

	0–1	02:49 – M. Aaltonen
	0–2	11:12 – M. Aaltonen (M. Koivisto, S. Lepistö)
22:45 – D. Tomášek (R. Říčka, J. Jeřábek)	1–2
	1–3	27:02 – R. Hintz (A. Gröndahl)
	1–4	32:52 – (PP1) A. Erkinjuntti (H. Haapala, O. Osala)
47:12 – M. Jordán	2–4

4 min
Penalties
4 min
25
Shots
19

16 December 2016; 19:00	Russia	5–1 (3–0, 0–1, 2–0)	Czech Republic	VTB Ice Palace, Moscow; Attendance: 11,668

Game reference

Igor Shestyorkin
Goalies
Dominik Furch

S. Plotnikov (I. Kovalčuk, A. Byelov) – 05:40	1–0
P. Dacjuk (I. Kovalchuk) – 08:21	2–0
V. Tkachev (S. Andronov, V. Antipin) – 11:27	3–0
	3–1	27:47 – T. Zohorna (M. Jordán)
I. Telegin (A. Svetlakov, V. Nichushkin) – 42:58	4–1
I. Kovalčuk (A. Svetlakov) (PH1) – 59:02	5–1

12 min
Penalties
12 min
27
Shots
23

17 December 2016; 12:00	Finland	2–4 (0–2, 2–2, 0–0)	Sweden	VTB Ice Palace, Moscow; Attendance: 5,240

Game reference

Harri Säteri
Goalies
Viktor Fasth

	0–1	05:30 – E. Gustafsson (L. Omark)
	0–2	16:31 – A. Bergström (P. Zackrisson, D. Rundblad)
	0–3	21:42 – M. Nygren (H. Tömmernes, L. Omark) (PH1)
M. Aaltonen (S. Lepistö) (PH1) – 24:33	1–3
	1–4	27:24 – P. Zackrisson (H. Tömmernes)
H. Haapala (R. Hintz, T. Eronen) (PH1) – 28:34	2–4

16 min
Penalties
8 min
18
Shots
37

18 December 2016; 13:00	Sweden	1–4 (0–0, 1–2, 0–2)	Czech Republic	VTB Ice Palace, Moscow; Attendance: 5,105

Game reference

Johan Gustafsson
Goalies
Pavel Francouz

	0–1	21:13 – A. Polášek (R. Kousal)
E. Johansson (J. Ryno, L. Omark) – 31:37	1–1
	1–2	34:13 – D. Kämpf (L. Radil)
	1–3	57:26 – J. Jeřábek (L. Radil, D. Kubalík)
	1–4	59:46 – (EN) O. Vitásek (V. Sobotka)

6 min
Penalties
12 min
31
Shots
21

18 December 2016; 17:00	Russia	4–3 (3–1, 1–1, 0–1)	Finland	VTB Ice Palace, Moscow; Attendance: 11,970

Game reference

Igor Shestyorkin
Goalies
Joni Ortio

	0–1	00:46 – H. Pesonen (J. Mankinen)
M. Shalunov (I. Lyubushkin, V. Antipin) – 01:37	1–1
Y. Yakovlev (S. Plotnikov) (PH1) – 07:31	2–1
I. Telegin (B. Kiselevich, I. Ozhiganov) – 09:36	3–1
I. Kovalchuk (P. Dacjuk) – 32:53	4–1
	4–2	36:46 – H. Haapala (T. Hartikainen, M. Aaltonen)
	4–3	40:15 – M. Aaltonen (T. Hartikainen)

6 min
Penalties
6 min
28
Shots
34

== Scoring leaders ==
Pos	Player	Country	GP	G	A	Pts	+/−	PIM	POS
1	Miro Aaltonen	Finland	3	4	1	5	+1	4	F
2	Ilya Kovalchuk	Russia	3	2	2	4	+1	6	F
3	Linus Omark	Sweden	3	0	4	4	+3	2	F
4	Henrik Haapala	Finland	3	2	1	3	-1	0	F
5	Ivan Telegin	Russia	3	2	0	2	-1	0	F

GP = Games played; G = Goals; A = Assists; Pts = Points; +/− = Plus/minus; PIM = Penalties in minutes; POS = Position
Source: quanthockey

== Goaltending leaders ==
Pos	Player	Country	TOI	GA	GAA	Sv%	SO
1	Igor Shesterkin	Russia	119:27	4	2.01	93.10	0
2	Viktor Fasth	Sweden	120:00	3	1.50	92.50	0
3	Pavel Francouz	Czech Republic	118:35	5	2.53	90.00	0
4	Joni Ortio	Finland	118:35	6	3.04	88.24	0

TOI = Time on ice (minutes:seconds); SA = Shots against; GA = Goals against; GAA = Goals Against Average; Sv% = Save percentage; SO = Shutouts
Source: swehockey
