= 1997 Baltika Cup =

Tournament details
- Host country: Russia
- City: Moscow
- Venue: 1 (in 1 host city)
- Dates: 17–21 December 1997
- Teams: 4

Final positions
- Champions: Czech Republic (1st title)
- Runners-up: Russia
- Third place: Sweden
- Fourth place: Finland

Tournament statistics
- Games played: 8
- Goals scored: 35 (4.38 per game)
- Attendance: 9,800 (1,225 per game)
- Scoring leader: (Czech Republic) David Moravec (5 points)

Awards
- MVP: (Russia) Alexander Kharitonov

The 1997 Baltika Cup was played between 17 and 21 December 1997. The Czech Republic, Finland, Sweden and Russia played a round-robin for a total of three games per team and six games in total. All of the matches were played in Luzhniki Palace of Sports in Moscow, Russia. Russia won the tournament. The tournament was part of the 1997–98 Euro Hockey Tour.

== Standings ==
| Pos | Team | Pld | W | D | L | GF | GA | GD | Pts |
|---|---|---|---|---|---|---|---|---|---|
| 1 | Czech Republic | 3 | 1 | 2 | 0 | 17 | 11 | +6 | 5 |
| 2 | Russia | 3 | 1 | 1 | 1 | 3 | 8 | −5 | 4 |
| 3 | Sweden | 3 | 1 | 1 | 1 | 8 | 7 | +1 | 4 |
| 4 | Finland | 3 | 0 | 2 | 1 | 7 | 9 | −2 | 2 |

Source: swehockey

== Games ==
All times are local. Moscow – (Moscow Time – UTC+4)

=== Group Stage ===
| 17 December 1997; 13:00 | Czech Republic | 4-4 (2-0, 1-2, 1-2) | Finland | Luzhniki Palace of Sports, Moscow; Attendance: 300 |

Game reference
| 8 min | Penalties | 8 min |

| 17 December 1997; 16:30 | Russia | 0-0 (0-0, 0-0, 0-0) | Sweden | Luzhniki Palace of Sports, Moscow; Attendance: 3,000 |

Game reference
| | | | Referee: (Belarus) Sergej Bervenskij |
| 4 min | Penalties | 8 min | Referee: (Belarus) Sergej Bervenskij |
| 21 | Shots | 6 | Referee: (Belarus) Sergej Bervenskij |

| 18 December 1997; 13:00 | Czech Republic | 6-6 (4-3, 1-3, 1-0) | Sweden | Luzhniki Palace of Sports, Moscow |

Game reference

Referee:
(Russia) Leonid Vaisfeld

| | 0-1 | 04:39 – Huusko (Tornberg) (PP) |
| Vykoukal (Patera) – 08:14 | 1-1 |
| Procházka (Kaberle) – 09:27 | 2-1 |
| Bělohlav (Růžička) – 09:34 | 3-1 |
| Moravec (Benýšek, Beránek) – 09:46 | 4-1 |
| | 4-2 | 12:22 – Nord (Påhlsson, Salomonsson) |
| | 4-3 | 13:27 – Lindquist (Johansson) |
| Beránek (Kaberle) (PP) – 22:32 | 5-3 |
| | 5-4 | 27:43 – Johnsson |
| | 5-5 | 29:21 – Nordström (Johnsson) |
| | 5-6 | 31:17 – Kjellberg (Lindquist) |
| Dopita (Špaček) – 58:56 | 6-6 |

12 min
Penalties
10 min
20
Shots
22

| 18 December 1997; 16:30 | Finland | 1-2 (0-1, 0-0, 1-1) | Russia | Luzhniki Palace of Sports, Moscow |

| 20 December 1997; 11:00 | Sweden | 1-3 (0-1, 0-2, 1-0) | Finland | Luzhniki Palace of Sports, Moscow; Attendance: 500 |

Game reference

Referee:
(Russia) Sergei Karabanov

| | 0-1 | 16:39 – Kakko (Varvio) |
| | 0-2 | 23:37 – Karalahti (Peltonen) |
| | 0-3 | 34:48 – Timonen (Helminen, Karalahti) (PP) |
| Kjellberg (Westlund) – 47:31 | 1-3 |

8 min
Penalties
8 min
19
Shots
18

| 20 December 1997; 15:00 | Russia | 1-7 (0-0, 1-7, 0-0) | Czech Republic | Luzhniki Palace of Sports, Moscow; Attendance: 6,000 |

Game reference
| 16 min | Penalties | 16 min |

=== PlayOff ===
Semifinals
1
4
3
2

Final
Czech Republic | 1
Russia | 0
Third place
Finland | 1
Sweden | 2

| 21 December 1997; 11:00 | Finland | 1-2 (0-0, 0-2, 1-0) | Sweden | Luzhniki Palace of Sports, Moscow; Attendance: 500 |

Game reference

Referee:
(Russia) Leonid Vaisfeld

| | 0-1 | 23:45 – Huokko (Kjellberg) (PP) |
| | 0-2 | 26:42 – Sundblad |
| Ruuttu (Ruutu, Törmänen) (PP) – 55:14 | 1-2 |

14 min
Penalties
10 min
25
Shots
21

| 21 December 1997; 15:00 | Czech Republic | 1-0 (1-0, 0-0, 0-0) | Russia | Luzhniki Palace of Sports, Moscow; Attendance: 7,000 |

Game reference
| | | | Referee: (Germany) Gerhard Müller |
| Dopita (Beránek, Moravec) – 16:04 / 1-0 | | | Referee: (Germany) Gerhard Müller |
| 10 min | Penalties | 23 min | Referee: (Germany) Gerhard Müller |

== Scoring leaders ==
| Pos | Player | Country | GP | G | A | Pts | +/− | PIM | POS |
|---|---|---|---|---|---|---|---|---|---|
| 1 | David Moravec | Czech Republic | 4 | 4 | 1 | 5 | +3 | 0 | F |
| 2 | Josef Beránek | Czech Republic | 4 | 1 | 4 | 5 | +4 | 2 | F |
| 3 | Jiří Dopita | Czech Republic | 4 | 1 | 3 | 4 | +2 | 4 | F |
| 3 | Ville Peltonen | Finland | 4 | 1 | 3 | 4 | +1 | 0 | F |
| 5 | Patric Kjellberg | Sweden | 4 | 2 | 1 | 3 | 0 | 0 | F |

GP = Games played; G = Goals; A = Assists; Pts = Points; +/− = Plus/minus; PIM = Penalties in minutes; POS = Position
Source: quanthockey

== Tournament awards ==
The tournament directorate named the following players in the tournament 1997:

- Best goaltender: (Finland) Pasi Kuivalainen
- Best defenceman: (Russia) Dmitri Erofeyev
- Best forward: (Czech Republic) Jiří Dopita
- Most Valuable Player: (Russia) Alexander Kharitonov
