= Valeri Bragin =

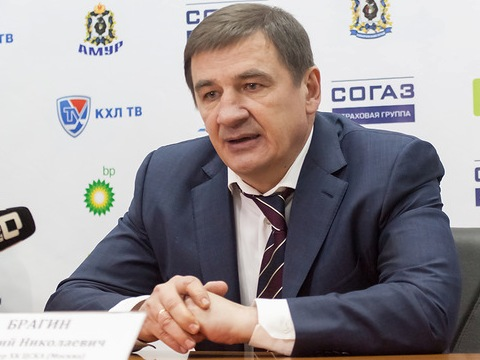
- Born: May 31, 1956 (age 69)
- Height: 5 ft 10 in (178 cm)
- Weight: 172 lb (78 kg; 12 st 4 lb)
- Position: Forward
- Shot: Left
- Played for: HC Spartak Moscow; Khimik Voskresensk; Rødovre SIK
- NHL draft: Undrafted
- Playing career: 1978–1994

Valeri Nikolayevich Bragin (Russian: Валерий Николаевич Брагин) (born May 31, 1956) is the current assistant coach of SKA Saint Petersburg of the Kontinental Hockey League (KHL). He is also a retired ice hockey forward. He is a former coach of the CSKA Moscow team in the KHL and the Russian national team. He is an ethnic Tatar.

== Playing career ==
Valeri Bragin started his career with HC Spartak Moscow, where he played in the top Soviet league from 1978. In 1981, he joined Khimik Voskresensk, where he played for 8 seasons. In 1989, Bragin moved to Denmark where he was the player/coach for Rødovre SIK in the Danish League. He won the Danish title with Rødovre in 1990. In that season, he was also named league player of the year. The following season, he won a silver medal with Rødovre. In 1992 and 1993, he led the Rødovre team to consecutive bronze medals in the Danish league. Bragin ended his playing career at the age of 38 with Rødovre following the 1993-94 season.

== Coaching career ==
Having acted as player/coach with Rødovre, Bragin became the full-time coach for the Russian Under-18 junior team, which he led to a gold medal at the 2004 IIHF World U18 Championships. The following season, he coached the Russian National Junior Team to a silver medal at the 2005 World Junior Ice Hockey Championships.

His first full-time head coach job at the club level came with HC Spartak Moscow in the Russian Superleague for the 2007-08 season. Following a stint as an assistant coach with Atlant Moscow Oblast for the 2009–10 KHL season, Bragin returned as the head coach of the Russian National Junior Team in the summer of 2010.

He led the Russian junior team to a gold medal at the 2011 World Junior Ice Hockey Championships in Buffalo, New York, USA.
