= Tobias Viklund =

Swedish ice hockey player (born 1986)

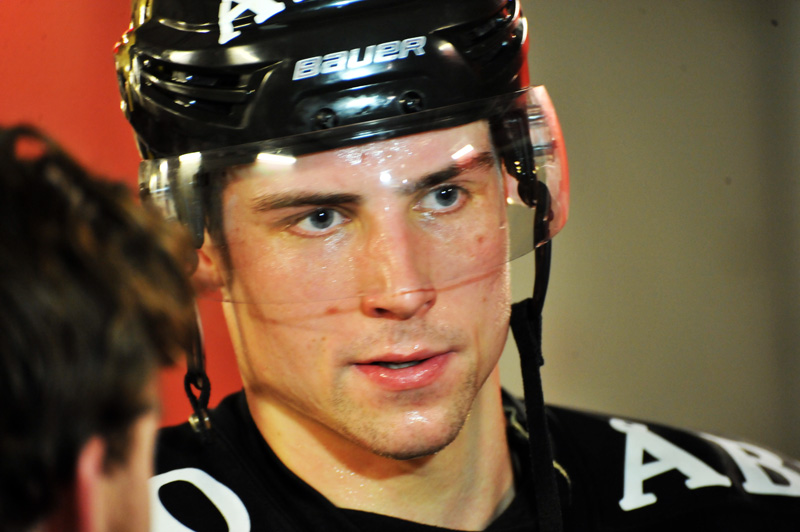
- Born: 8 May 1986 (age 40) Kramfors, Sweden
- Height: 5 ft 11 in (180 cm)
- Weight: 194 lb (88 kg; 13 st 12 lb)
- Position: Defence
- Shoots: Left
- Allsv team Former teams: Modo Hockey; Skellefteå AIK; Frölunda HC; AIK IF; Avtomobilist Yekaterinburg; HC Lada Togliatti; Kunlun Red Star; HC Yugra; Kölner Haie; Spartak Moscow
- Playing career: 2004–present

Tobias Viklund (born 8 May 1986) is a Swedish professional ice hockey defenceman, who is currently under contract with Modo Hockey of the HockeyAllsvenskan (Allsv).

== Playing career ==
Viklund joined Russian club, Avtomobilist Yekaterinburg of the Kontinental Hockey League, on a two-year contract on 1 May 2013. He had previously spent the entirety of his 9 year professional career in the Swedish Hockey League.

Viklund played five seasons in the KHL with four different clubs before opting to leave as a free agent, agreeing to a one-year contract with German club, Kölner Haie of the Deutsche Eishockey Liga on 10 June 2018.

In the 2018–19 season, Viklund appeared in just 14 games with Kölner Haie, posting 5 assists, before opting to return for a second stint with Kunlun Red Star of the KHL on 7 November 2018.

== International play ==
Viklund has played several times for the Swedish national team, most recently in Channel One Cup in December 2008.

== Career statistics ==
=== Regular season and playoffs ===
			Regular season					Playoffs
Season	Team	League	GP	G	A	Pts	PIM	GP	G	A	Pts	PIM
2000–01	Kramfors-Alliansen	Div. 1	2	0	0	0	0	—	—	—	—	—
2001–02	Kramfors-Alliansen	Div. 1	21	1	2	3	27	—	—	—	—	—
2002–03	Kramfors-Alliansen	Div. 1	1	2	0	2	0	—	—	—	—	—
2002–03	Modo Hockey	J20	8	0	0	0	0	—	—	—	—	—
2003–04	Kramfors-Alliansen	Div. 1	1	0	0	0	14	—	—	—	—	—
2003–04	Modo Hockey	J20	36	7	4	11	24	8	2	2	4	4
2004–05	Tegs SK	Allsv	4	0	1	1	2	—	—	—	—	—
2004–05	Modo Hockey	J20	16	1	7	8	38	5	1	0	1	4
2004–05	Modo Hockey	SEL	29	0	0	0	8	—	—	—	—	—
2005–06	Modo Hockey	J20	3	2	1	3	2	—	—	—	—	—
2005–06	Modo Hockey	SEL	46	0	8	8	20	5	0	0	0	0
2006–07	Modo Hockey	J20	1	0	0	0	4	—	—	—	—	—
2006–07	Modo Hockey	SEL	55	3	5	8	28	20	1	0	1	2
2007–08	Skellefteå AIK	SEL	53	4	7	11	14	5	0	0	0	0
2008–09	Skellefteå AIK	SEL	51	3	5	8	22	11	0	4	4	2
2009–10	Frölunda HC	SEL	48	4	8	12	14	7	0	0	0	2
2010–11	Frölunda HC	SEL	55	2	2	4	36	—	—	—	—	—
2011–12	AIK IF	SEL	51	2	8	10	8	12	2	3	5	6
2012–13	AIK IF	SEL	53	2	11	13	28	—	—	—	—	—
2013–14	Avtomobilist Yekaterinburg	KHL	52	9	14	23	20	4	0	3	3	2
2014–15	Avtomobilist Yekaterinburg	KHL	47	5	10	15	16	5	2	1	3	4
2015–16	HC Lada Togliatti	KHL	57	7	9	16	20	—	—	—	—	—
2016–17	Kunlun Red Star	KHL	56	5	14	19	33	5	0	2	2	0
2017–18	HC Yugra	KHL	34	5	3	8	14	—	—	—	—	—
2018–19	Kölner Haie	DEL	14	0	5	5	0	—	—	—	—	—
2018–19	Kunlun Red Star	KHL	30	0	6	6	18	—	—	—	—	—
2019–20	Spartak Moscow	KHL	17	0	3	3	6	2	0	0	0	0
2020–21	Modo Hockey	Allsv	6	0	0	0	16	—	—	—	—	—
SHL totals			441	20	54	74	178	60	3	7	10	12
KHL totals			293	31	59	90	127	16	2	6	8	6

=== International ===
Year	Team	Event	Result	GP	G	A	Pts	PIM
2004	Sweden	WJC18	5th	6	0	0	0	4
2006	Sweden	WJC	5th	6	1	0	1	6
Junior totals				12	1	0	1	10
