= Russia men's national ice hockey team =

Men's national ice hockey team

Russia
- The coat of arms of Russia is the badge used on the players’ jerseys.
- Nickname: Красная Машина (The Red Machine)
- Association: Russian Hockey Federation
- General manager: Roman Rotenberg
- Head coach: Alexei Zhamnov
- Assistants: Sergei Fedorov; Alexei Kudashov; Sergei Gonchar
- Captain: Alexander Ovechkin
- Most games: Ilya Kovalchuk (271)
- Top scorer: Ilya Kovalchuk (107)
- Most points: Ilya Kovalchuk (245)
- Home stadium: CSKA Arena
- Team colors
- IIHF code: RUS
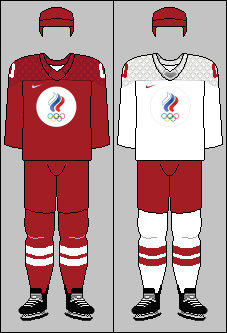

Ranking
- Current IIHF: NR (3 June 2026)
- Highest IIHF: 1 (2009, 2010–12)
- Lowest IIHF: 7 (2004)

First international
- Russia 2–2 Sweden (Saint Petersburg, Russia; 12 April 1992)

Biggest win
- Russia 10–0 Italy (Bratislava, Slovakia; 15 May 2019)

Biggest defeat
- Finland 7–1 Russia (Helsinki, Finland; 22 April 1997); Czech Republic 7–1 Russia (Moscow, Russia; 20 December 1997)

Olympics
- Appearances: 9 (first in 1994)
- Medals: Gold: (2018 as OAR) (Note: Some controversy exists over how many Olympic gold medals should be attributed to the Russian national team. The IIHF and Ice Hockey Federation of Russia consider Russia to have won gold at the Olympics twice, attributing the 1992 gold medal victory to the Russian national team as the immediate successor of the CIS team, as well as the 2018 gold medal by the Olympic Athletes from Russia. However, the International Olympic Committee does not recognize Russia as ever having won the gold medal in an Olympic tournament, as the 1992 and 2018 tournaments were won by athletes from the Unified Team and Olympic Athletes from Russia delegations, respectively, and not by a Russian delegation.); Silver: (1998, 2022 as ROC); Bronze: (2002)

IIHF World Championships
- Appearances: 29 (first in 1992)
- Best result: Gold: (1993, 2008, 2009, 2012, 2014)

World Cup
- Appearances: 3 (first in 1996)
- Best result: 3rd: (1996)

International record (W–L–T)
- 508–273–43

Medal record

Representing Russia, Olympic Athletes from Russia, and ROC

Olympic Games
Gold medal – first place	2018 Pyeongchang	Team
Silver medal – second place	1998 Nagano	Team
Silver medal – second place	2022 Beijing	Team
Bronze medal – third place	2002 Salt Lake City	Team

World Championship
Gold medal – first place	1993 Germany	
Gold medal – first place	2008 Canada	
Gold medal – first place	2009 Switzerland	
Gold medal – first place	2012 Finland/Sweden	
Gold medal – first place	2014 Belarus	
Silver medal – second place	2002 Sweden	
Silver medal – second place	2010 Germany	
Silver medal – second place	2015 Czech Republic	
Bronze medal – third place	2005 Austria	
Bronze medal – third place	2007 Russia	
Bronze medal – third place	2016 Russia	
Bronze medal – third place	2017 Germany/France	
Bronze medal – third place	2019 Slovakia	

The Russian men's national ice hockey team (Russian: Сборная России по хоккею с шайбой) is the national men's ice hockey team of Russia, overseen by the Ice Hockey Federation of Russia. As of 2021, they were rated third in the IIHF World Ranking. The team has competed internationally from 1992 until it was provisionally suspended in 2022, and is recognized by the IIHF as the successor to the Soviet Union team and CIS team. Russia has been one of the most successful national ice hockey teams in the world and a member of the so-called "Big Six," the unofficial group of the six strongest men's ice hockey nations, along with Canada, the Czech Republic, Finland, Sweden, and the United States. The European nations of the Big Six participate in the Euro Hockey Tour, which Russia won nine times since 2005. Since September 2021, the head coach is Alexei Zhamnov, who took over from Valeri Bragin.

Since the establishment of the team, Russia has participated in 29 IIHF World Championships tournaments and nine Olympic ice hockey tournaments, winning five world championships and one Olympic gold medal.

After the Russian invasion of Ukraine, the International Ice Hockey Federation suspended Russia from all levels of competition on 28 February 2022. In April 2022, the Federation banned Russia from participating in the 2023 IIHF World Championship.

== History ==
=== Origins ===
The Allrussian Hockey League was founded by some clubs in the Russian Empire and entered the International Ice Hockey Federation (IIHF) in 1911. However, probably due to misunderstandings ("hockey" was identified with bandy or Russian hockey in Russia, not with the modern ice hockey rules developed in Canada) the Russian team left the organization. There were no matches involving a team from Imperial Russia.

Interest in this sport grew in the Soviet Union in the second half of the 1940s. The first reactions were skeptical; one sports journal, Physical Culture and Sports, characterized it as such: "The game is quite individual and primitive, with few combinations, not as in bandy. Therefore, Canadian hockey should not be cultivated into our country..." However, Canadian hockey became more and more popular in the Soviet Union.

The first Soviet Championships League was introduced in 1946. The national team was formed shortly after, playing their first matches in a series of exhibitions against LTC Praha in 1948. In 1952, the Hockey Federation of the USSR joined the International Ice Hockey League, and so received the permission to play in the World Championships and the Olympics. That year is seen as the birth of the Soviet national ice hockey team, the predecessor team of the Russia men's national ice hockey team. The Soviets won the 1954 Ice Hockey World Championships, and two years later they won gold at the 1956 Winter Olympics.

From then until the demise of the Soviet Union in 1991, the "Red Machine" (Russian: Красная Машина; Krasnaya Mashina) was one of the most dominant teams in international play, winning nearly every World Championship and Olympic tournament, as well as defeating many teams with professional players, such as in the 1974 Summit Series, the Super Series, and the 1981 Canada Cup. Until 1977, professional players were not able to participate in the World Championship, and it was not until 1988 that they could play in the Winter Olympics. The Soviet team was populated with amateur players who were hired by Soviet enterprises (aircraft industry, food workers, tractor industry) or organizations (KGB, Red Army, Soviet Air Force) that sponsored what would be presented as an after-hours social sports society hockey team for their workers but were set up for the athletes to train full-time. This type of amateur player was contested by Canada and the United States whose best players were participating in professional leagues.

=== After the USSR's dissolution ===
The Soviet Union dissolved shortly before the 1992 Winter Olympics, so a Unified Team largely consisting of the former Soviet republics competed instead. The CIS national ice hockey team, composed almost entirely of Russians, with Lithuanian-born Darius Kasparaitis and Ukrainian-born Alexei Zhitnik the only non-Russians, competed as part of this Olympic delegation. The team finished second in its preliminary group, beating co-favorites Canada, 5–4, but losing to Czechoslovakia, 3–4. The CIS team then defeated the Finns and Americans, 6–1 and 5–2, respectively. In the final, they played Canada again, winning 3–1 and claimed the gold medal. The team was coached by the Russian and former Soviet coach Viktor Tikhonov. In later years, the IIHF recognized this gold medal as being won by the Russian national team, rather than by the CIS. However, the International Olympic Committee has not recognized Russia as the Olympic champions for this Winter Games.

Russia joined the IIHF as an independent state on 6 May 1992, along with 10 other states, including seven other former Soviet republics. Unlike the others, which applied as new member states and had to begin playing at the bottom tiers of the World Championship, Russia was allowed to replace the Soviet Union in its position and was thus entered into the elite division for the 1992 World Championship. Russia's first actual games after the Soviet dissolution were a series of five friendly games between Sweden, Germany and Switzerland, all taking place in April 1992, the debut game occurring on 12 April 1992 against Sweden and ending in a 2–2 draw. At the 1992 World Championship Russia finished first in its preliminary group but lost to Sweden in the quarterfinals, 2–0. They, however, won the next edition of the tournament, beating Germany, Canada, and Sweden in the playoffs and clinching their first title as Russia and 23rd, including the USSR's totals.

=== The post-Soviet drought ===
As the USSR fell apart, so did Russia's elite hockey program. At the 1994 Winter Olympics they finished fourth overall, losing the bronze medal match to Finland. Russia also competed at the 1996 World Cup, the successor tournament to the Canada Cup, where the team lost in the semi-finals to the eventual winner, the United States. At the 1998 Winter Olympics, Russia won five consecutive games and reached the gold medal match, where they lost to the Czech Republic, 0–1.

In 1994, Russian journalist Vsevolod Kukushkin reported that "The people are upset. Russia is a nation of critics." He said the Russian team was struggling with finances to support training, no funding was received from the national level, and professional teams in Russia were struggling to stay afloat. He also reported that the Russian people were upset at losing the nation's best players to the National Hockey League, and not playing on the Russian national team.

=== The Russian resurgence ===
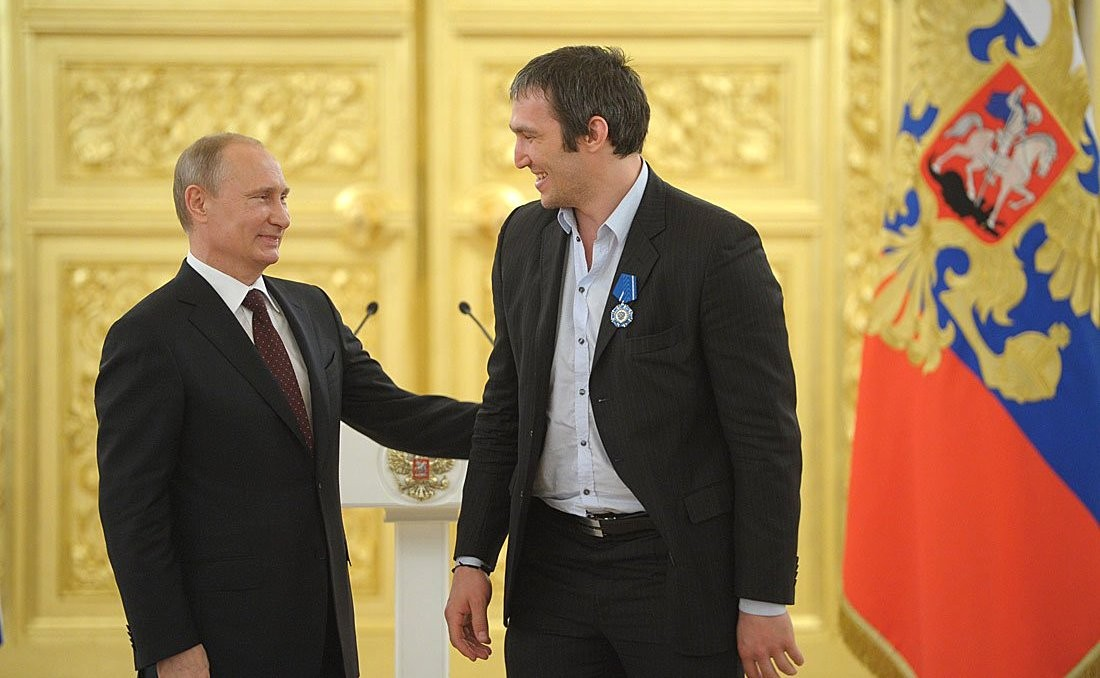
Vladimir Putin and Russian team captain Alexander Ovechkin

==== The Bykov period ====
After failing to win the gold medal between 1993 and 2007, the Russians restructured the national league as the KHL and hired the 1993 World Champion, Vyacheslav Bykov, as the head coach. Another 1993 champion, Sergey Fedorov, was named the team captain. Afterwards, Russia won the 2008 and 2009 World Ice Hockey Championships with perfect records, beating Canada in the finals two times in a row. The Russians would make another run in 2010, losing to the Czech Republic in the gold medal game. However, the disastrous 2010 Olympics and 2011 World Championships led to Bykov's removal.

==== Bilyaletdinov at the helm ====
Bykov was replaced with Bilyaletdinov, under whose leadership Russia won the 2012 Men's World Ice Hockey Championships with yet another perfect record, beating Slovakia, 6–2, in the gold medal game. However, as a result of the 2013 Championship and 2014 Olympic performances, Bilyaletdinov was replaced with Oleg Znarok.

==== The Znarok years ====
Znarok then led the Russians to the gold medal in the 2014 World Ice Hockey Championship after defeating Finland 5–2 in the final, with a perfect record. The 2014 tournament result set the most perfect records in the IIHF World Championships. For this accomplishment, the Russian team was honored in the Kremlin.

Russia earned a medal in each subsequent tournament, including the silver medal in 2015 and the bronze medals in 2016 and 2017. The team also reached the semi-finals of the World Cup, losing to Canada, the eventual winner.

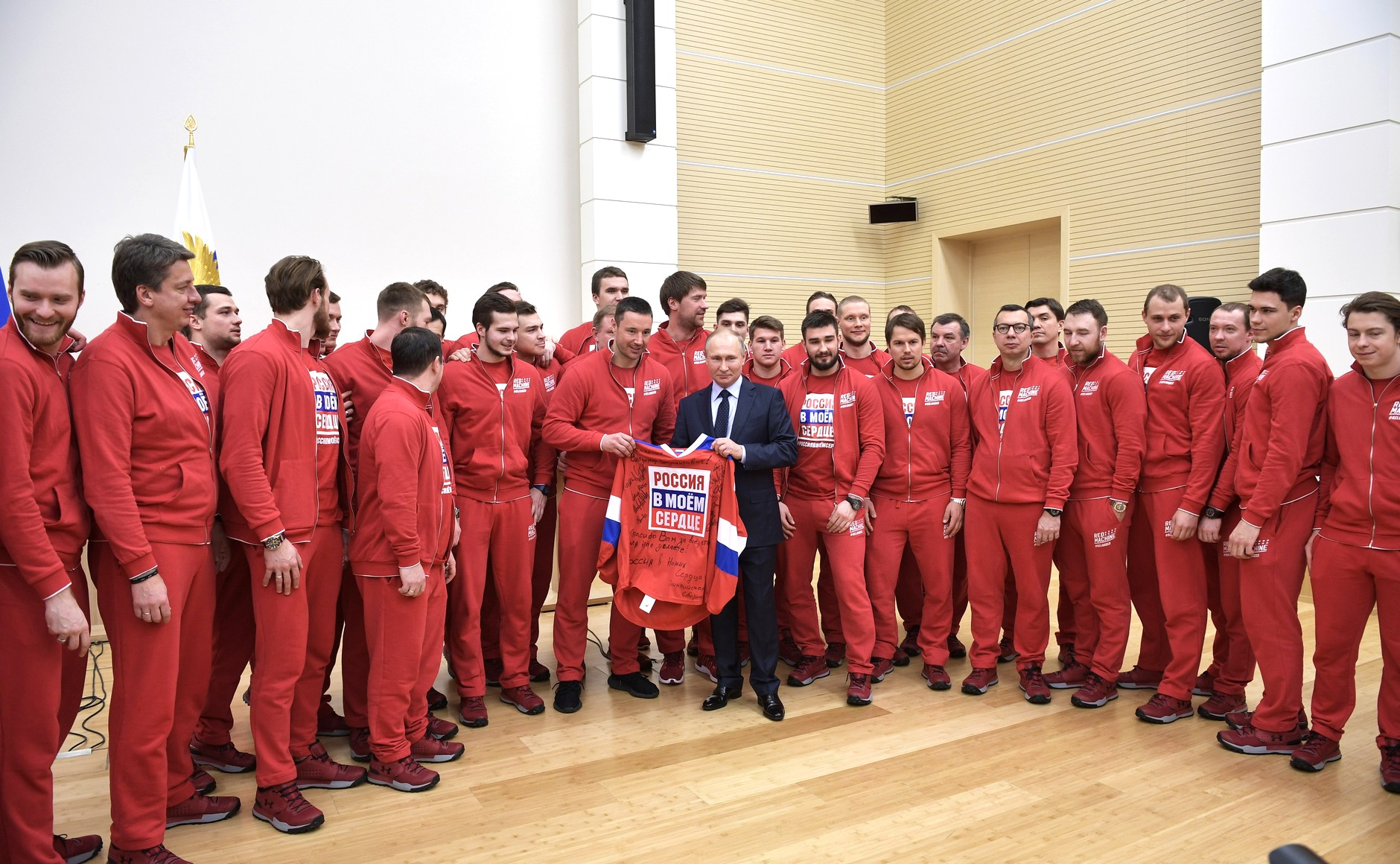
Russian players met with President Vladimir Putin on 31 January 2018, prior to their departure to South Korea

In 2018, the Russian Olympic Committee was disqualified by the International Olympic Committee for doping, but the Russian players were cleared to participate by the IOC under the Olympic flag as the Olympic Athletes from Russia (OAR) using professional Russian hockey players with no previous drug violations and a consistent history of drug testing. Like the rest of the Olympic hockey teams in 2018, the Russian team could not use NHL players due to the league's prohibiting player participation in the Olympics. As a result, the team relied on players from the KHL (15 from a reigning champion, SKA Saint Petersburg, 8 from CSKA Moscow and 2 from Metallurg Magnitogorsk).

After a loss in their first game to Slovakia, the OAR team defeated Slovenia and the United States, qualifying for the quarterfinals. The team then defeated Norway and the Czech Republic to reach the finals. The team won the gold medal after a 4–3 overtime victory over the German team in the final. Ilya Kovalchuk and Pavel Datsyuk each won their first gold in their fifth Olympic appearance and together with Slava Voynov, were the only players with prior Olympic experience on the team. In its post-Olympics World Ranking, the IIHF considered the OAR team as the Russian team in its rankings. The IIHF considers this victory to be Russia's second gold medal in the Olympics, as they also attributed the 1992 Unified Team gold medal to Russia, however, the IOC does not attribute either of these results to Russia.

After the Olympics, Znarok became a consultant for the Russian National Team. He retired as Russia's most decorated modern head coach, with a World Championship, an Olympic gold medal, and a Euro Hockey Tour victory.

==== Vorobiev as head coach ====
Ilya Vorobiev was hired as the interim head coach of the Russian national hockey team in April 2018 for the 2018 IIHF World Championship and the second half of 2017–18 Euro Hockey Tour. In the remainder of Euro Hockey Tour, Vorobiev led the Russian team to a 1–5 record, following the 5–1 record of the Znarok-led team in the first half of 2017–18 Euro Hockey Tour, for the team to finish 6–6 on the season. At the 2018 World Championship, Russia finished second in its group and lost to Canada 4–5 in the quarterfinal, finishing sixth overall.

Next season, Russia went 8–4 in the 2018–19 Euro Hockey Tour, winning the competition and went all the way to the semi-final at the 2019 World Championship, where it lost to Finland before beating the Czech Republic for the bronze. Following the World Championship, Vorobiev was dismissed and replaced with Alexei Kudashov.

==== Kudashov's realm ====
Kudashov went 3–6 at the 2019–20 Euro Hockey Tour before the 2020 IIHF World Championship was canceled due to the COVID-19 pandemic in Russia. Kudashov was sacked in June 2020 and replaced with Valeri Bragin, a decorated coach of the Russia men's U20 team.

==== Bragin's team ====
Bragin proceeded to win the 2020–21 Euro Hockey Tour with a 10–2 record. At the 2021 IIHF World Championship, Russia went 6–1 in the group stage but then lost in the quarter-finals to Canada, which finished with a 3–4 record in the group stage but went on to win the tournament. Bragin was replaced by Alexei Zhamnov in September 2021.

==== Zhamnov's team ====
With Zhamnov, the Russian national team participated at the 2022 Olympics in Beijing (under the Russian Olympic Committee flag and the moniker ROC), where they reached the second Olympic final in a row, losing to Finland 1–2 and winning silver medals.

After the Russian invasion of Ukraine, the International Ice Hockey Federation suspended Russia from all levels of competition. In April 2022, the Federation banned Russia from participating in the 2023 IIHF World Championship.

Due to the ban, a second Russian team consisting of players under 25 took part in the 2023 Channel One Cup alongside the main roster, and newcomers Kazakhstan and Belarus.

== Tournament record ==
=== Olympic Games ===
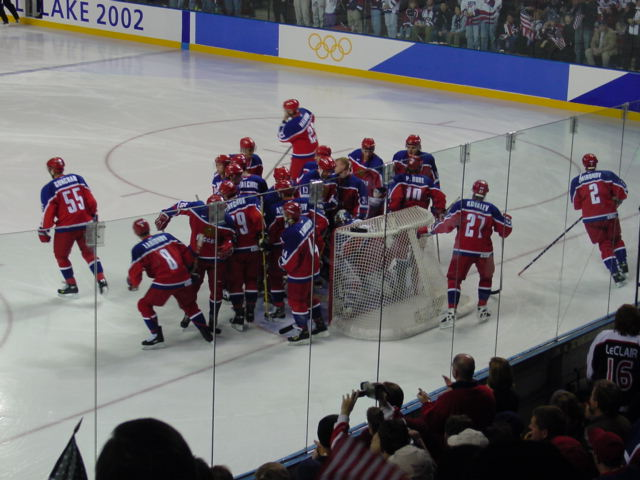
The bronze medal-winning Russian team at the 2002 Winter Olympics

Games	GP	W	L	T	GF	GA	Coach	Captain	Roster	Finish
1956 – 1988	As Soviet Union									
(France) 1992 Albertville	As Unified Team									
(Norway) 1994 Lillehammer	8	4	4	0	26	24	Viktor Tikhonov	Alexander Smirnov	roster	4th place
(Japan) 1998 Nagano	6	5	1	0	26	12	Vladimir Yurzinov	Pavel Bure	roster	Silver
(United States) 2002 Salt Lake City	6	3	2	1	19	14	Viacheslav Fetisov	Igor Larionov	roster	Bronze
(Italy) 2006 Turin	8	5	3	0	25	18	Vladimir Krikunov	Alexei Kovalev	roster	4th place
(Canada) 2010 Vancouver	4	2	2	0	16	13	Vyacheslav Bykov	Alexei Morozov	roster	6th place
(Russia) 2014 Sochi	5	3	2	0	13	8	Zinetula Bilyaletdinov	Pavel Datsyuk	roster	5th place
(South Korea) 2018 Pyeongchang (As OAR)
(South Korea) 2018 Pyeongchang (As OAR)	6	5	1	0	27	9	Oleg Znarok	Pavel Datsyuk	roster	Gold
(China) 2022 Beijing (As ROC)
(China) 2022 Beijing (As ROC)	6	4	2	0	14	10	Alexei Zhamnov	Vadim Shipachyov	roster	Silver
(Italy) 2026 Milan / Cortina	Suspended due to the Russian invasion of Ukraine									

=== World Championship ===
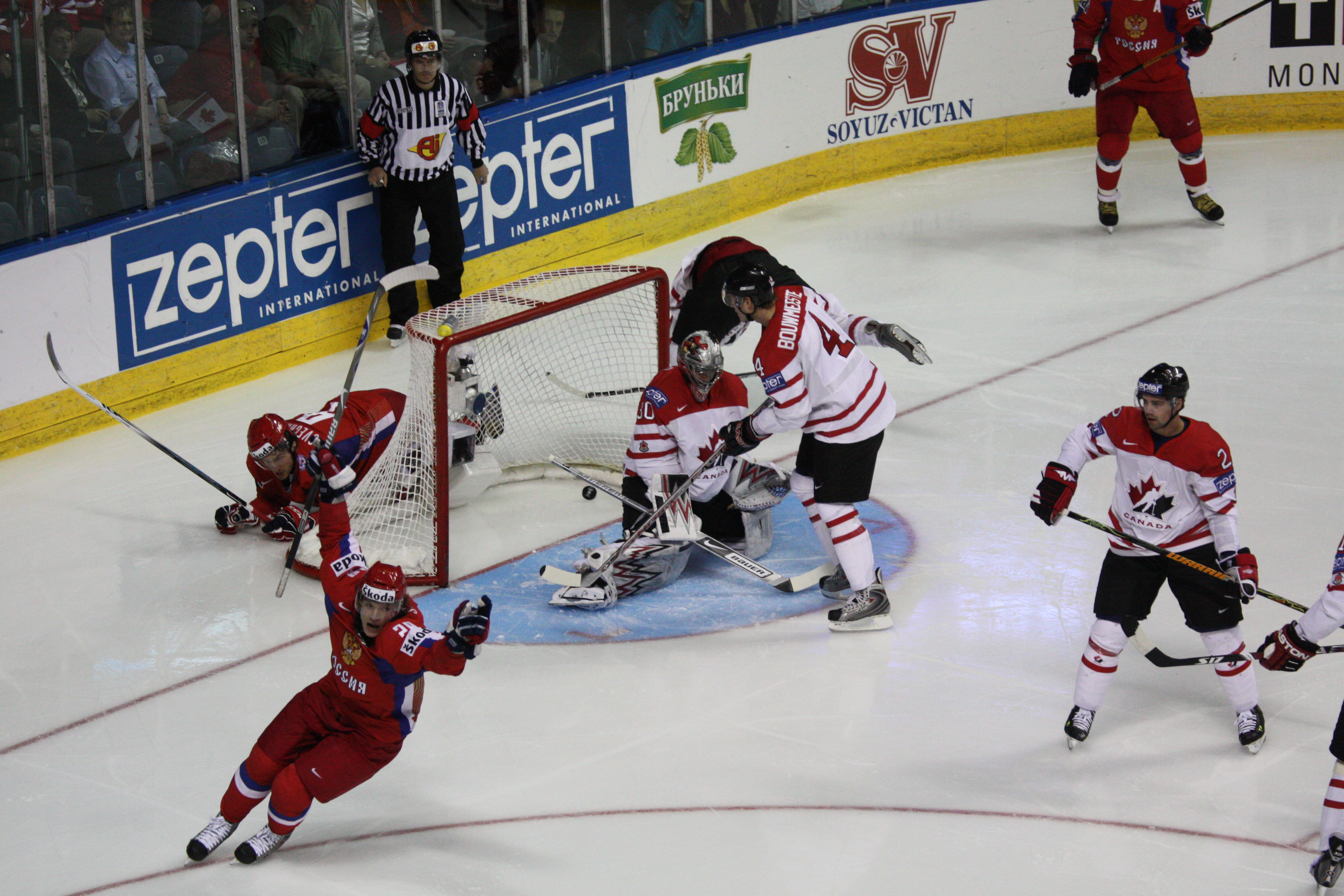
Alexander Semin's first goal in the 2008 IIHF World Championship final

Championship	GP	W	OW	T	OL	L	GF	GA	Coach	Captain	Finish
1954 – 1991	As Soviet Union										
(Czechoslovakia) 1992 Prague, Bratislava	6	4	–	1	–	1	23	12	Viktor Tikhonov	Vitali Prokhorov	5th place
(Germany) 1993 Munich, Dortmund	8	5	–	1	–	2	30	18	Boris Mikhailov	Vyacheslav Bykov	Gold
(Italy) 1994 Bolzano, Canazei and Milan	6	4	–	1	–	1	31	10	Boris Mikhailov	Ilya Byakin	5th place
(Sweden) 1995 Stockholm, Gävle	6	5	–	0	–	1	26	12	Boris Mikhailov	Vyacheslav Bykov	5th place
(Austria) 1996 Vienna	8	6	–	0	1	1	33	17	Vladimir Vasilyev	Alexei Yashin	4th place
(Finland) 1997 Helsinki, Tampere, Turku	11	5	–	3	–	3	35	33	Igor Dmitriev	Sergei Bautin	4th place
(Switzerland) 1998 Basel, Zürich	6	4	–	1	–	1	29	18	Vladimir Yurzinov	Vitali Prokhorov	5th place
(Norway) 1999 Oslo, Hamar, Lillehammer	6	3	–	1	–	2	18	13	Alexander Yakushev	Alexei Yashin	5th place
(Russia) 2000 St. Petersburg	5	1	–	0	–	4	8	12	Alexander Yakushev	Pavel Bure	11th place
(Germany) 2001 Nuremberg, Cologne, Hanover	6	3	–	0	1	2	19	15	Boris Mikhailov	Alexei Yashin	6th place
(Sweden) 2002 Gothenburg, Karlstad, Jönköping	8	2	1	1	–	4	22	22	Boris Mikhailov	Andrei Kovalenko	Silver
(Finland) 2003 Helsinki, Tampere, Turku	6	2	–	0	–	4	16	17	Vladimir Plyuschev	Sergei Gusev	7th place
(Czech Republic) 2004 Prague, Ostrava	5	1	–	0	–	4	10	14	Viktor Tikhonov	Oleg Tverdovsky	10th place
(Austria) 2005 Vienna, Innsbruck	8	4	1	2	–	1	26	18	Vladimir Krikunov	Alexei Kovalev	Bronze
(Latvia) 2006 Riga	6	4	–	1	1	0	25	15	Vladimir Krikunov	Maxim Sushinsky	5th place
(Russia) 2007 Moscow	8	7	0	–	1	0	35	13	Vyacheslav Bykov	Petr Schastlivy	Bronze
(Canada) 2008 Quebec City, Halifax	8	5	3	–	0	0	36	17	Vyacheslav Bykov	Alexei Morozov	Gold
(Switzerland) 2009 Bern, Kloten	8	7	1	–	0	0	36	17	Vyacheslav Bykov	Alexei Morozov	Gold
(Germany) 2010 Cologne, Mannheim, Gelsenkirchen	8	7	0	–	0	1	28	10	Vyacheslav Bykov	Ilya Kovalchuk	Silver
(Slovakia) 2011 Bratislava, Košice	8	3	0	–	1	4	18	25	Vyacheslav Bykov	Alexei Morozov	4th place
(Finland) (Sweden) 2012 Helsinki, Stockholm	10	10	0	–	0	0	44	14	Zinetula Bilyaletdinov	Ilya Nikulin	Gold
(Sweden) (Finland) 2013 Stockholm, Helsinki	8	5	0	–	0	3	32	22	Zinetula Bilyaletdinov	Ilya Nikulin	6th place
(Belarus) 2014 Minsk	10	10	0	–	0	0	42	10	Oleg Znarok	Alexander Ovechkin	Gold
(Czech Republic) 2015 Prague, Ostrava	10	6	1	–	1	2	40	25	Oleg Znarok	Ilya Kovalchuk	Silver
(Russia) 2016 Moscow, St. Petersburg	10	8	0	–	0	2	44	16	Oleg Znarok	Pavel Datsyuk	Bronze
(France) (Germany) 2017 Paris, Cologne	10	7	1	–	0	2	45	17	Oleg Znarok	Sergei Mozyakin	Bronze
(Denmark) 2018 Copenhagen, Herning	8	5	0	–	2	1	36	15	Ilya Vorobiev	Pavel Datsyuk	6th place
(Slovakia) 2019 Bratislava, Košice	10	8	1	–	0	1	43	13	Ilya Vorobiev	Ilya Kovalchuk	Bronze
(Switzerland) 2020 Zürich, Lausanne	Cancelled due to the COVID-19 pandemic										
(Latvia) 2021 Riga (As ROC)
(Latvia) 2021 Riga (As ROC)	8	5	1	–	1	1	29	12	Valeri Bragin	Anton Slepyshev	5th place
2022–present	Suspended due to the Russian invasion of Ukraine										

=== World Cup ===
Year	GP	W	L	T	GF	GA	Coach	Captain	Finish
1996 World Cup of Hockey	5	2	3	0	19	19	Boris Mikhailov	Viacheslav Fetisov	Semi-finals
2004 World Cup of Hockey	4	2	2	0	12	11	Zinetula Bilyaletdinov	Alexei Kovalev	Quarter-finals
2016 World Cup of Hockey	4	2	2	0	11	10	Oleg Znarok	Alexander Ovechkin	Semi-finals

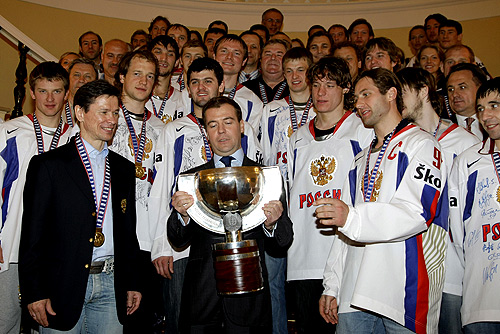
President Dmitry Medvedev meets with the national hockey team following the 2008 World Championship

=== Euro Hockey Tour ===
The Euro Hockey Tour (EHT) started in 1996 and is held every season between the quartet of European nations of the Big Six nations of ice hockey. The usual format is to have the teams play against each other four times, once in Finland, once in Russia, once in Sweden, and once in the Czech Republic. There are occasional deviations from the format if additional nations, such as Canada, are invited to compete. Russia has won the EHT nine times as of 2022.

==== Euro Hockey Tour medal table ====
===== Men =====
Rank	Nation	Gold	Silver	Bronze	Total
1	Finland (FIN)	9	10	9	28
2	Russia (RUS)	9	6	5	20
3	Sweden (SWE)	8	7	5	20
4	Czech Republic (CZE)	4	7	10	21
5	Switzerland (SUI)	0	0	1	1
Totals (5 entries)		30	30	30	90

===== Women =====
Rank	Nation	Gold	Silver	Bronze	Total
1	Finland (FIN)	4	1	0	5
2	Czech Republic (CZE)	1	3	0	4
3	Sweden (SWE)	0	1	4	5
4	Russia (RUS)	0	0	1	1
Totals (4 entries)		5	5	5	15

==== Tournament summary ====
- Karjala Tournament:
  - (gold) Gold medal (2006, 2007, 2008, 2009, 2011, 2016, 2018, 2020)
  - (silver) Silver medal (1998, 1999, 2001, 2010, 2013, 2017)
  - (bronze) Bronze medal (1996, 1997, 2000, 2003, 2005, 2012, 2014, 2015, 2019, 2021)
- Channel One Cup:
  - (gold) Gold medal (1999, 2000, 2004, 2005, 2006, 2007, 2008, 2010, 2012, 2014, 2017, 2018, 2020, 2023, 2024)
  - (silver) Silver medal (1996, 1997, 2001, 2009, 2016, 2019, 2021, 2022)
  - (bronze) Bronze medal (2002, 2003, 2011, 2013)
- Sweden Hockey Games:
  - (gold) Gold medal (2003, 2006, 2008, 2017, 2021)
  - (silver) Silver medal (2007, 2009, 2011, 2019)
  - (bronze) Bronze medal (1997, 2004, 2005, 2010, 2012, 2013, 2018)
- Czech Hockey Games:
  - (gold) Gold medal (2002, 2006, 2007, 2009 (April))
  - (silver) Silver medal (2001, 2005, 2009 (September), 2011, 2013 (April), 2013 (August))
  - (bronze) Bronze medal (1997, 2003, 2012, 2017, 2019)

==== Russia's Euro Hockey Tour (EHT) Cup medal table ====
As of January 2025

Tournament	Gold	Silver	Bronze	Medals
Karjala Tournament	8	6	10	24
Channel One Cup	13	8	4	25
Sweden Hockey Games	5	4	7	16
Czech Hockey Games	4	6	5	15
Total	30	24	26	80

=== Other tournaments ===
- Deutschland Cup: (gold) Gold medal (1992, 1993, 2017, 2018)
- Nissan Cup: (silver) Silver medal (1992, 1994)
- Northern Lights Tournament: (bronze) Bronze medal (1993)

== Team ==
=== Current roster ===
Roster for the 2021 IIHF World Championship.

Head coach: Valeri Bragin

No.	Pos.	Name	Height	Weight	Birthdate	Team
2	D	Artyom Zub	1.88 m (6 ft 2 in)	90 kg (200 lb)	3 October 1995 (age 31)	(Canada) Ottawa Senators
4	D	Vladislav Gavrikov – A	1.90 m (6 ft 3 in)	97 kg (214 lb)	21 November 1995 (age 30)	(United States) New York Rangers
7	D	Dmitry Orlov	1.82 m (6 ft 0 in)	92 kg (203 lb)	23 July 1991 (age 35)	(United States) San Jose Sharks
8	F	Ivan Morozov	1.86 m (6 ft 1 in)	89 kg (196 lb)	5 May 2000 (age 26)	(Russia) Spartak Moscow
9	D	Ivan Provorov	1.86 m (6 ft 1 in)	91 kg (201 lb)	13 January 1997 (age 29)	(United States) Columbus Blue Jackets
10	F	Sergey Tolchinsky	1.73 m (5 ft 8 in)	72 kg (159 lb)	3 February 1995 (age 31)	(Russia) SKA Saint Petersburg
11	F	Dmitri Voronkov	1.92 m (6 ft 4 in)	86 kg (190 lb)	10 September 2000 (age 26)	(United States) Columbus Blue Jackets
15	F	Pavel Karnaukhov	1.90 m (6 ft 3 in)	95 kg (209 lb)	15 March 1997 (age 29)	(Russia) CSKA Moscow
16	D	Nikita Zadorov	1.96 m (6 ft 5 in)	104 kg (229 lb)	16 April 1995 (age 31)	(United States) Boston Bruins
21	F	Konstantin Okulov	1.84 m (6 ft 0 in)	82 kg (181 lb)	18 February 1995 (age 31)	(Russia) CSKA Moscow
25	F	Mikhail Grigorenko	1.89 m (6 ft 2 in)	95 kg (209 lb)	16 May 1994 (age 32)	(Russia) SKA Saint Petersburg
27	D	Igor Ozhiganov	1.88 m (6 ft 2 in)	94 kg (207 lb)	13 October 1992 (age 34)	(Russia) Dynamo Moscow
31	G	Alexander Samonov	1.82 m (6 ft 0 in)	76 kg (168 lb)	23 August 1995 (age 31)	(Russia) Salavat Yulaev Ufa
32	G	Sergei Bobrovsky	1.88 m (6 ft 2 in)	86 kg (190 lb)	20 September 1988 (age 38)	(United States) Florida Panthers
37	F	Evgeny Timkin	1.95 m (6 ft 5 in)	99 kg (218 lb)	3 September 1990 (age 36)	(Russia) Salavat Yulaev Ufa
57	F	Artyom Shvets-Rogovoy	1.87 m (6 ft 2 in)	84 kg (185 lb)	3 March 1995 (age 31)	(Russia) SKA Saint Petersburg
58	F	Anton Slepyshev – C	1.85 m (6 ft 1 in)	98 kg (216 lb)	13 May 1994 (age 32)	(Russia) CSKA Moscow
60	G	Ivan Bocharov	1.87 m (6 ft 2 in)	76 kg (168 lb)	18 May 1995 (age 31)	(Russia) Lokomotiv Yaroslavl
71	F	Anton Burdasov – A	1.88 m (6 ft 2 in)	97 kg (214 lb)	9 May 1991 (age 35)	(Russia) Traktor Chelyabinsk
72	F	Emil Galimov	1.87 m (6 ft 2 in)	84 kg (185 lb)	9 May 1992 (age 34)	(Russia) SKA Saint Petersburg
78	F	Maxim Shalunov	1.93 m (6 ft 4 in)	90 kg (200 lb)	31 January 1993 (age 33)	(Russia) Lokomotiv Yaroslavl
81	F	Vladislav Kamenev	1.89 m (6 ft 2 in)	88 kg (194 lb)	12 August 1996 (age 30)	(Russia) CSKA Moscow
87	D	Rushan Rafikov	1.89 m (6 ft 2 in)	91 kg (201 lb)	15 May 1995 (age 31)	(Russia) Lokomotiv Yaroslavl
89	D	Nikita Nesterov	1.80 m (5 ft 11 in)	83 kg (183 lb)	28 March 1993 (age 33)	(Russia) CSKA Moscow
91	F	Vladimir Tarasenko	1.82 m (6 ft 0 in)	95 kg (209 lb)	13 December 1991 (age 34)	(United States) Minnesota Wild
94	F	Alexander Barabanov	1.79 m (5 ft 10 in)	89 kg (196 lb)	17 June 1994 (age 32)	(Russia) Ak Bars Kazan
96	F	Andrei Kuzmenko	1.81 m (5 ft 11 in)	88 kg (194 lb)	4 February 1996 (age 30)	(United States) Los Angeles Kings
98	D	Grigori Dronov	1.90 m (6 ft 3 in)	91 kg (201 lb)	10 January 1998 (age 28)	(Russia) Traktor Chelyabinsk

=== Coaching history ===
Olympics

- 1994 – Viktor Tikhonov
- 1998 – Vladimir Yurzinov (Pyotr Vorobyov, Zinetula Bilyaletdinov)
- 2002 – Viacheslav Fetisov (Vladimir Yurzinov, Vladislav Tretiak)
- 2006 – Vladimir Krikunov (Vladimir Yurzinov, Boris Mikhailov)
- 2010 – Vyacheslav Bykov (Igor Zakharkin)
- 2014 – Zinetula Bilyaletdinov (Valery Belov, Dmitry Yushkevich, Igor Nikitin, Valeri Belousov, Vladimir Myshkin)
- 2018 – Oleg Znarok (Harijs Vītoliņš, Ilya Vorobiev, Rashit Davydov, Igor Nikitin, Alexei Zhamnov)
- 2022 – Alexei Zhamnov (Sergei Fedorov, Alexei Kudashov, Sergei Gonchar)

World Championships

- 1992 – Viktor Tikhonov
- 1993 – Boris Mikhailov (Pyotr Vorobyov, Igor Tuzik, Gennady Tsygurov)
- 1994 – Boris Mikhailov (Pyotr Vorobyov, Igor Tuzik, Gennady Tsygurov)
- 1995 – Boris Mikhailov (Pyotr Vorobyov, Igor Tuzik, Gennady Tsygurov)
- 1996 – Vladimir Vasiliev (Gennady Tsygurov, Viktor Tikhonov)
- 1997 – Igor Dmitriev (Boris Mikhailov, Igor Tuzik)
- 1998 – Vladimir Yurzinov (Pyotr Vorobyov, Zinetula Bilyaletdinov)
- 1999 – Alexander Yakushev (Pyotr Vorobyov, Zinetula Bilyaletdinov)
- 2000 – Alexander Yakushev (Pyotr Vorobyov, Zinetula Bilyaletdinov)
- 2001 – Boris Mikhailov (Valeri Belousov, Vladimir Krikunov)
- 2002 – Boris Mikhailov (Valeri Belousov, Vladimir Krikunov)
- 2003 – Vladimir Plyushchev (Alexander Yakushev, Nikolai Tolstikov)
- 2004 – Viktor Tikhonov
- 2005 – Vladimir Krikunov (Vladimir Yurzinov, Boris Mikhailov)
- 2006 – Vladimir Krikunov (Vladimir Yurzinov, Boris Mikhailov)
- 2007 – Vyacheslav Bykov (Igor Zakharkin)
- 2008 – Vyacheslav Bykov (Igor Zakharkin)
- 2009 – Vyacheslav Bykov (Igor Zakharkin)
- 2010 – Vyacheslav Bykov (Igor Zakharkin, Valeri Bragin, Andrei Nazarov)
- 2011 – Vyacheslav Bykov (Igor Zakharkin)
- 2012 – Zinetula Bilyaletdinov (Valery Belov, Dmitry Yushkevich, Igor Nikitin, Vladimir Myshkin)
- 2013 – Zinetula Bilyaletdinov (Valery Belov, Dmitry Yushkevich, Igor Nikitin, Vladimir Myshkin)
- 2014 – Oleg Znarok (Harijs Vītoliņš, Vladimir Fedosov, Igor Nikitin, Yuri Zhdanov, Rashit Davydov, Oleg Kupryanov)
- 2015 – Oleg Znarok (Harijs Vītoliņš, Vladimir Fedosov, Igor Nikitin, Yuri Zhdanov, Rashit Davydov, Oleg Kupryanov)
- 2016 – Oleg Znarok (Harijs Vītoliņš, Ilya Vorobiev, Rashit Davydov, Igor Nikitin)
- 2017 – Oleg Znarok (Harijs Vītoliņš, Ilya Vorobiev, Rashit Davydov, Igor Nikitin)
- 2018 – Ilya Vorobiev (Alexei Zhamnov, Anvar Gatiyatulin, Rashit Davydov, Igor Nikitin)
- 2019 – Ilya Vorobiev (Alexei Zhamnov, Anvar Gatiyatulin, Rashit Davydov, Igor Nikitin)
- 2021 – Valeri Bragin (Albert Leschov, Stefan Persson, Konstantin Shafranov, Alexander Titov)

World Cup

- 1996 – Boris Mikhailov
- 2004 – Zinetula Bilyaletdinov
- 2016 – Oleg Znarok

== Uniform evolution ==
National team jerseys

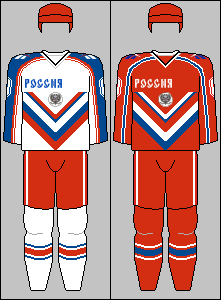
1994 Olympic jersey

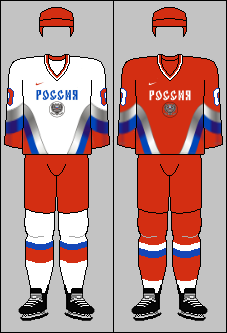
1998–1999 IIHF jerseys

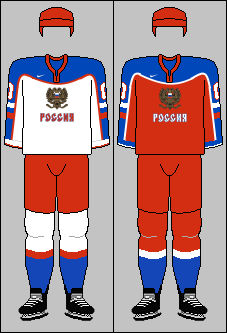
2000–2004 IIHF jerseys

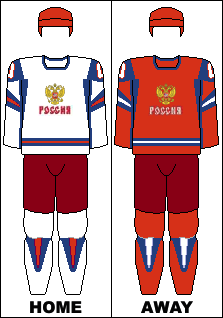
2010–2013 IIHF jerseys

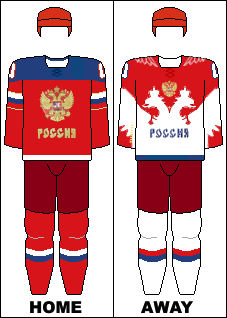
2014 Olympic jersey

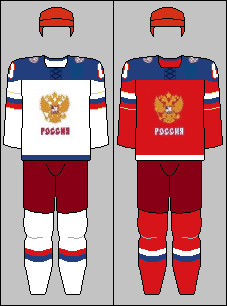
2014–2017 IIHF jerseys

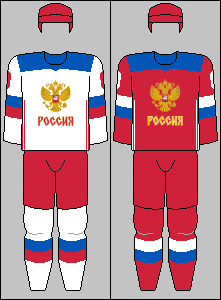
2016 WCH jersey

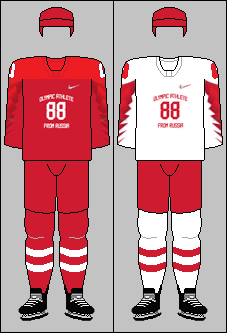
2018 OAR Olympic jersey

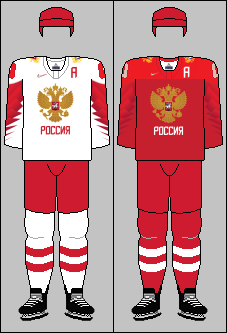
2018–2020 IIHF jerseys

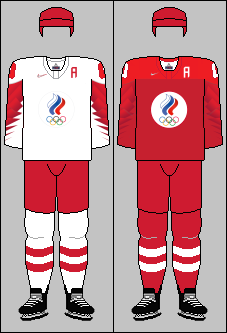
2021 ROC IIHF jerseys

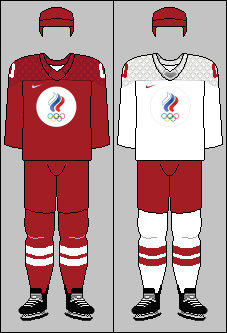
2022 ROC Olympic jersey

== See also ==
- Soviet Union national ice hockey team
- CIS national ice hockey team
