= Viktor Lööv =

Swedish ice hockey player

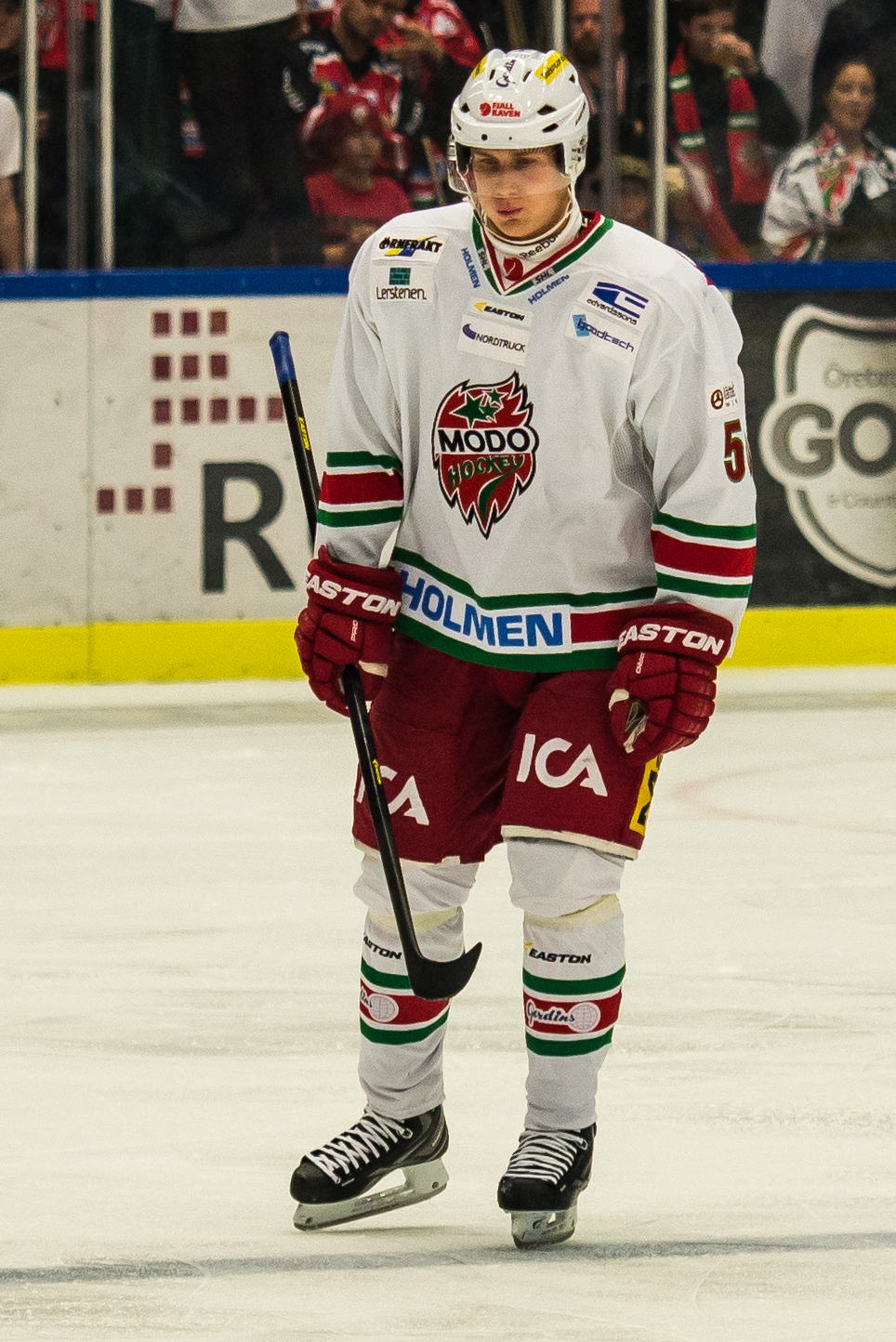
- Viktor Lööv in 2013
- Born: 16 November 1992 (age 33) Södertälje, Sweden
- Height: 1.91 m (6 ft 3 in)
- Weight: 98 kg (216 lb; 15 st 6 lb)
- Position: Defence
- Shoots: Left
- NL team Former teams: EHC Biel; Södertälje SK; Modo Hockey; Toronto Maple Leafs; Jokerit
- National team: Sweden
- NHL draft: 209th overall, 2012; Toronto Maple Leafs
- Playing career: 2011–present

Viktor Lööv (born 16 November 1992) is a Swedish professional ice hockey defenseman currently playing for EHC Biel of the National League (NL).

== Playing career ==
He began playing professionally with Södertälje SK in the Elitserien during the 2010–11 Elitserien season and 2011 Kvalserien, before moving to Modo Hockey for a solitary season in 2013–14.

On 16 April 2014, Lööv was signed to a three-year entry-level contract with the Toronto Maple Leafs.

On 18 February 2016, following an injury to Matt Hunwick, Lööv was recalled by the Leafs on an emergency basis, and made his NHL debut the same night, in a game against the New York Rangers. Lööv recorded his first career NHL point, an assist on a goal scored by P. A. Parenteau, less than 5 minutes into the game.

Lööv would return to the Marlies the next season, and play there until a trade on 18 February 2017 (less than two weeks before the NHL trade deadline) sent him to the New Jersey Devils in exchange for forward Sergey Kalinin. Lööv would finish out the season with the Devils' AHL affiliate, the Albany Devils.

Lööv re-signed with the Devils on 9 May 2017, agreeing to a one-year, two-way contract worth $650,000. He was assigned to begin the 2017–18 season, with inaugural affiliate, the Binghamton Devils. On 8 February 2018, the New Jersey Devils traded Lööv to the Minnesota Wild in exchange for Christoph Bertschy and Mario Lucia.

On 25 May 2018, Lööv signed with Jokerit of the Kontinental Hockey League (KHL).

Lööv remained with Jokerit for three seasons, leaving the club following the 2020–21 season to sign a one-year contract with Swiss club, EHC Biel-Bienne of the NL on 25 May 2021.

== Career statistics ==
=== Regular season and playoffs ===
			Regular season					Playoffs
Season	Team	League	GP	G	A	Pts	PIM	GP	G	A	Pts	PIM
2009–10	Södertälje SK	J20	12	0	4	4	8	—	—	—	—	—
2010–11	Södertälje SK	J20	42	4	19	23	36	2	0	0	0	2
2010–11	Södertälje SK	SEL	—	—	—	—	—	1	0	0	0	0
2011–12	Södertälje SK	J20	5	0	3	3	2	4	2	0	2	2
2011–12	Södertälje SK	Allsv	50	3	3	6	42	—	—	—	—	—
2012–13	Södertälje SK	Allsv	40	2	6	8	49	10	0	3	3	8
2013–14	Modo Hockey	SHL	42	5	7	12	20	2	0	0	0	0
2014–15	Toronto Marlies	AHL	74	6	15	21	44	3	0	1	1	12
2015–16	Toronto Marlies	AHL	55	3	12	15	40	11	1	2	3	14
2015–16	Toronto Maple Leafs	NHL	4	0	2	2	0	—	—	—	—	—
2016–17	Toronto Marlies	AHL	41	2	4	6	43	—	—	—	—	—
2016–17	Albany Devils	AHL	10	0	0	0	6	3	0	0	0	2
2017–18	Binghamton Devils	AHL	36	5	12	17	45	—	—	—	—	—
2017–18	Iowa Wild	AHL	24	0	7	7	22	—	—	—	—	—
2018–19	Jokerit	KHL	56	7	10	17	67	5	0	1	1	18
2019–20	Jokerit	KHL	58	2	8	10	36	6	1	2	3	6
2020–21	Jokerit	KHL	55	3	16	19	41	3	0	0	0	11
2021–22	EHC Biel	NL	46	6	21	27	51	5	0	3	3	2
2022-23	EHC Biel	NL	50	7	15	22	24	17	1	4	5	8
2023-24	EHC Biel	NL	22	2	10	12	12
SHL totals			42	5	7	12	20	3	0	0	0	0
NHL totals			4	0	2	2	0	—	—	—	—	—
KHL totals			169	12	34	46	144	14	1	3	4	35

=== International ===
Year	Team	Event	Result	GP	G	A	Pts	PIM
2021	Sweden	WC	9th	7	0	0	0	2
Senior totals				7	0	0	0	2
