= Emil Johansson (ice hockey) =

Swedish ice hockey player (born 1996)

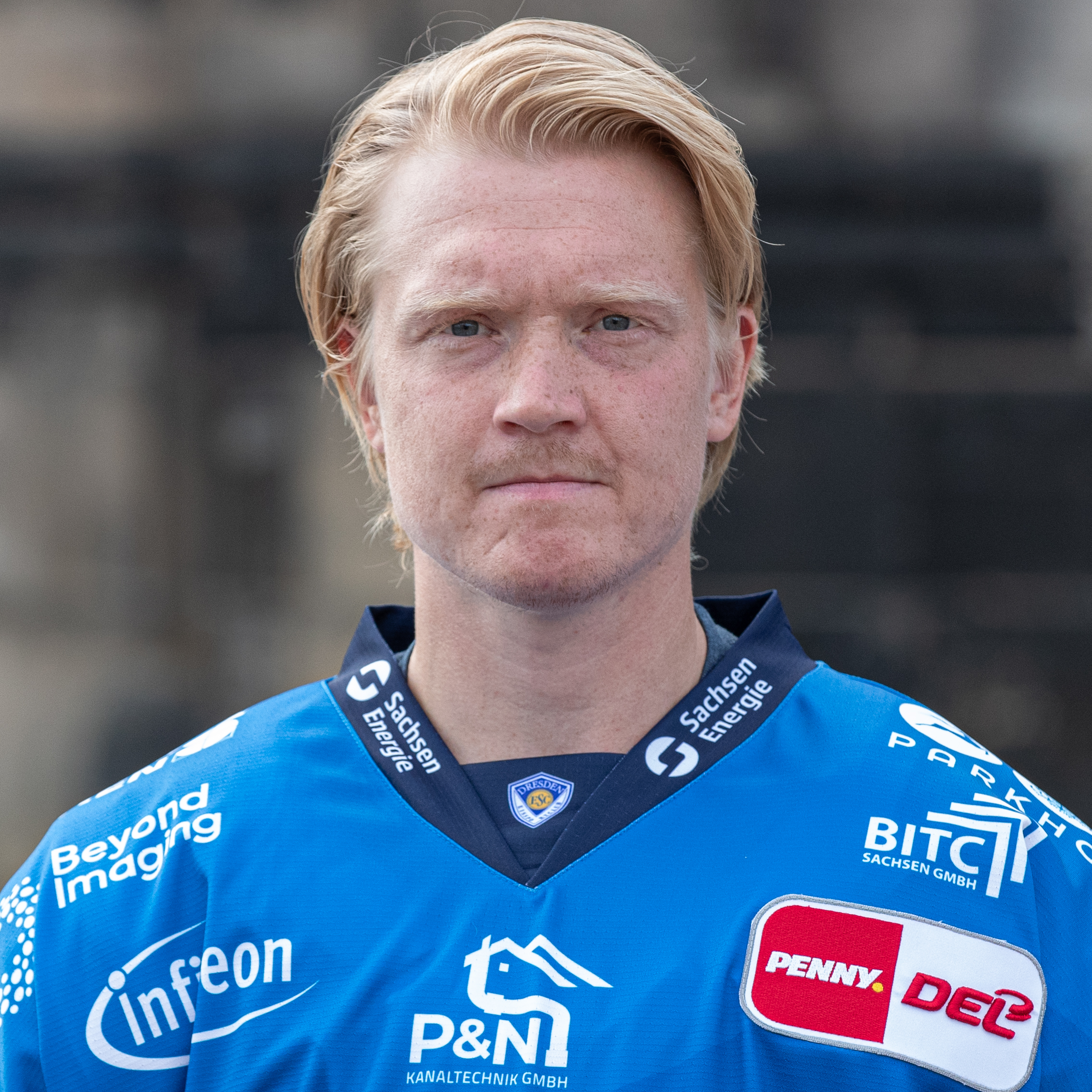
- Born: May 6, 1996 (age 30) Växjö, Sweden
- Height: 6 ft 0 in (183 cm)
- Weight: 189 lb (86 kg; 13 st 7 lb)
- Position: Defence
- Shoots: Left
- DEL team Former teams: Dresdner Eislöwen; HV71; Djurgårdens IF; Providence Bruins; Vaasan Sport; EHC München; HC TPS; EHC München
- NHL draft: 206th overall, 2014; Boston Bruins
- Playing career: 2014–present

Emil Johansson (born May 6, 1996) is a Swedish professional ice hockey defenceman who plays for Dresdner Eislöwen of the Deutsche Eishockey Liga (DEL). Johansson was selected by the Boston Bruins in the seventh round (206th overall) of the 2014 NHL entry draft.

== Playing career ==
Johansson played as a youth within Åseda IF and HV71 organizations. On October 1, 2014, Johansson was signed to a first team contract with HV71 for two-years. After playing his first two SHL seasons with HV71, for the 2016–17 SHL season, Johansson signed a one-season contract for Stockholm-based club Djurgårdens IF. Johansson appeared in 49 games and collected a personal best 7 goals and 17 points.

On March 24, 2017, Johansson agreed to a three-year entry-level contract with the Boston Bruins. He was immediately assigned to complete the 2016–17 season, with AHL affiliate the Providence Bruins on a professional try-out basis. On May 13, 2019, Johansson signed a three-year deal with HV71.

On 19 May 2021, Johansson left newly demoted HV71, and signed a one-year contract with Finnish top tier club, Vaasan Sport of the Liiga.

During the 2022–23 season, his second with Vaasan, Johansson contributed with 24 points through 43 games before leaving the club to join German club, EHC Red Bull München of the Deutsche Eishockey Liga (DEL), for the remainder of the season on 14 February 2023.

After helping Red Bull capture their fourth franchise DEL Championship, Johansson returned to the Finnish Liiga, signing a two-year contract with HC TPS on 9 May 2023.

== Career statistics ==
=== Regular season and playoffs ===
			Regular season					Playoffs
Season	Team	League	GP	G	A	Pts	PIM	GP	G	A	Pts	PIM
2012–13	HV71	J20	1	1	1	2	0	—	—	—	—	—
2013–14	HV71	J20	42	2	7	9	28	—	—	—	—	—
2014–15	HV71	J20	11	0	2	2	10	3	0	0	0	2
2014–15	HV71	SHL	35	0	1	1	12	6	0	0	0	4
2015–16	HV71	J20	2	1	2	3	4	—	—	—	—	—
2015–16	HV71	SHL	50	2	8	10	12	6	3	2	5	0
2016–17	Djurgårdens IF	SHL	49	7	10	17	26	3	0	0	0	4
2016–17	Providence Bruins	AHL	6	0	1	1	4	1	0	0	0	0
2017–18	Providence Bruins	AHL	53	2	8	10	23	—	—	—	—	—
2018–19	Providence Bruins	AHL	65	3	7	10	46	—	—	—	—	—
2019–20	HV71	SHL	51	2	4	6	28	—	—	—	—	—
2020–21	HV71	SHL	45	0	4	4	20	—	—	—	—	—
2021–22	Vaasan Sport	Liiga	58	6	19	25	63	—	—	—	—	—
2022–23	Vaasan Sport	Liiga	43	7	17	24	65	—	—	—	—	—
2022–23	EHC München	DEL	6	0	0	0	4	15	1	3	4	14
2023–24	HC TPS	Liiga	23	1	5	6	10	—	—	—	—	—
2023–24	EHC München	DEL	12	0	2	2	2	9	0	1	1	6
2024–25	EHC München	DEL	41	0	6	6	14	1	0	0	0	0
SHL totals			230	11	27	38	98	15	3	2	5	8
Liiga totals			124	14	41	55	138	—	—	—	—	—

Medal record

Representing Sweden

Ice hockey

Ivan Hlinka Memorial Tournament
Bronze medal – third place	2012 Czech Republic/Slovakia	

World U17 Hockey Challenge
Gold medal – first place	2013 Drummondville/Victoriaville, Quebec	

=== International ===
Year	Team	Event	Result	GP	G	A	Pts	PIM
2012	Sweden	IH18	3rd place, bronze medalist(s)	5	0	1	1	0
2013	Sweden	U17	1st place, gold medalist(s)	6	0	3	3	10
2013	Sweden	IH18	7th	4	0	1	1	6
Junior totals				15	0	5	5	16
