= Staffan Kronwall =

Swedish ice hockey player (born 1982)

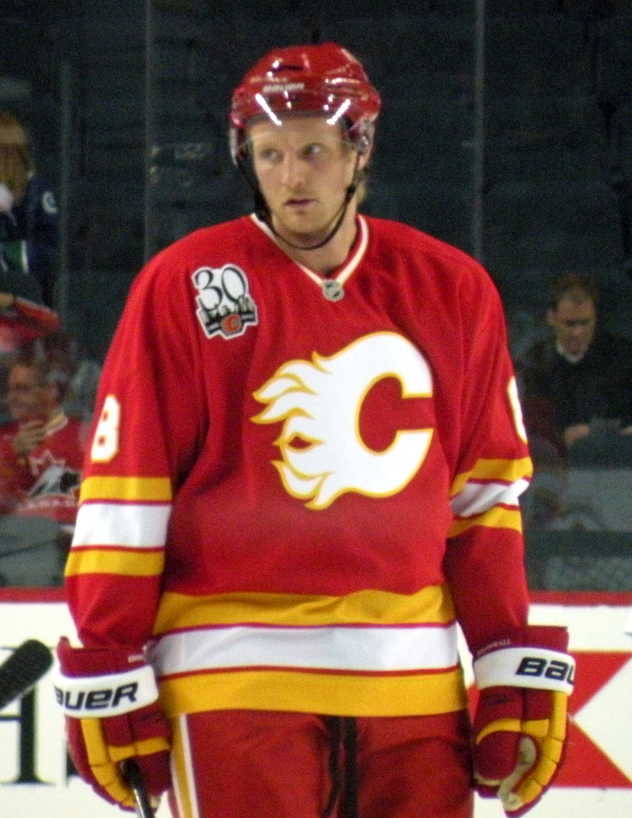
- Born: September 10, 1982 (age 43) Järfälla, Sweden
- Height: 6 ft 5 in (196 cm)
- Weight: 231 lb (105 kg; 16 st 7 lb)
- Position: Defence
- Shot: Left
- Played for: Djurgårdens IF; Brynäs IF; Toronto Maple Leafs; Washington Capitals; Calgary Flames; Severstal Cherepovets; Lokomotiv Yaroslavl
- National team: Sweden
- NHL draft: 285th overall, 2002; Toronto Maple Leafs
- Playing career: 2001–2020

Per Staffan Kronwall (born September 10, 1982) is a Swedish former professional ice hockey defenceman. He played in the National Hockey League (NHL) for the Calgary Flames, Toronto Maple Leafs and Washington Capitals. He also played for Djurgårdens IF and Brynäs IF of the Elitserien, as well as Severstal Cherepovets and Lokomotiv Yaroslavl in the Kontinental Hockey League (KHL). Kronwall was originally drafted 285th overall by the Maple Leafs in the 2002 NHL entry draft.

== Playing career ==
Kronwall represented Sweden at the 2002 World Junior Championship, playing seven games for Sweden.

Kronwall was then drafted by the Toronto Maple Leafs in the ninth round, 285th overall, of the 2002 NHL entry draft, spending the majority of his first four seasons in North American with the Leafs' American Hockey League (AHL) affiliate, the Toronto Marlies. Toronto later placed him on waivers midway through the 2008–09 season, where he was claimed by the Washington Capitals. He signed later with the Calgary Flames via free agency in 2009.

Kronwall scored his first and only NHL goal on October 6, 2009, in a 4–3 win against goaltender Jaroslav Halák of the Montreal Canadiens, but spent the majority of the season with the AHL's Abbotsford Heat. He remained with the Heat to begin the 2010–11 season, but sought to return to Sweden to be closer to his family. With the blessing of the Flames, Kronwall signed a one-year contract with his former team, Djurgårdens IF, on October 11, 2010. After one season with Djurgården, Kronwall moved to Russian side Severstal Cherepovets of the KHL.

Kronwall played the last eight seasons of his 19-year career with Lokomotiv Yaroslavl, captaining the club for five seasons before announcing his retirement following the 2019–20 season.

== International play ==
Medal record

Representing Sweden

World Championships
Gold medal – first place	2013 Sweden/Finland	
Silver medal – second place	2011 Slovakia	

Kronwall represented Sweden at the 2002 World Junior Ice Hockey Championships, where he was pointless in seven games.

Kronwall has also represented Sweden several times internationally. At the 2011 IIHF World Championship, he recorded one goal and three assists in nine games and won a silver medal. At the 2012 IIHF World Championship, he recorded one goal and one assist in eight games.

At the 2013 IIHF World Championship, he recorded one assist in ten games, winning a gold medal. At the 2015 IIHF World Championship, he recorded one goal and two assists in six games.

Kronwall represented Sweden at the 2018 Winter Olympics, where he served as alternate captain.

== Personal life ==
Kronwall is the younger brother of Niklas Kronwall, a former defenceman for the Detroit Red Wings.

== Career statistics ==
=== Regular season and playoffs ===
			Regular season					Playoffs
Season	Team	League	GP	G	A	Pts	PIM	GP	G	A	Pts	PIM
1999–00	Huddinge IK J18	J18 Allsv	2	0	1	1	0	5	0	2	2	0
1999–00	Huddinge IK J20	J20	34	2	0	2	38	—	—	—	—	—
2000–01	Huddinge IK J20	J20	21	5	1	6	14	2	1	0	1	2
2000–01	Huddinge IK	SWE-3	1	0	0	0	0	1	0	0	0	0
2001–02	Huddinge IK J20	J20	1	0	0	0	0	4	2	1	3	27
2001–02	Huddinge IK	SWE-2	42	4	7	11	30	—	—	—	—	—
2002–03	Djurgårdens IF	SEL	48	4	6	10	65	12	1	1	2	8
2003–04	Djurgårdens IF	SEL	44	1	5	6	54	4	0	1	1	2
2004–05	Brynäs IF	SEL	3	0	1	1	4	—	—	—	—	—
2004–05	Djurgårdens IF	SEL	35	1	4	5	43	12	2	0	2	10
2004–05	Djurgårdens IF J20	J20	5	2	4	6	0	—	—	—	—	—
2005–06	Toronto Marlies	AHL	16	1	10	11	12	4	0	2	2	2
2005–06	Toronto Maple Leafs	NHL	34	0	1	1	14	—	—	—	—	—
2006–07	Toronto Marlies	AHL	47	3	14	17	32	—	—	—	—	—
2007–08	Toronto Marlies	AHL	26	3	7	10	14	19	1	1	2	11
2007–08	Toronto Maple Leafs	NHL	18	0	0	0	7	—	—	—	—	—
2008–09	Toronto Marlies	AHL	42	7	18	25	46	—	—	—	—	—
2008–09	Washington Capitals	NHL	3	0	0	0	0	—	—	—	—	—
2008–09	Hershey Bears	AHL	17	2	7	9	13	21	3	9	12	6
2009–10	Calgary Flames	NHL	11	1	2	3	2	—	—	—	—	—
2009–10	Abbotsford Heat	AHL	44	5	23	28	24	9	0	2	2	0
2010–11	Abbotsford Heat	AHL	1	0	0	0	0	—	—	—	—	—
2010–11	Djurgårdens IF	SEL	45	7	13	20	14	7	0	1	1	2
2011–12	Severstal Cherepovets	KHL	52	4	13	17	28	6	1	1	2	10
2012–13	Lokomotiv Yaroslavl	KHL	50	10	12	22	14	6	3	4	7	2
2013–14	Lokomotiv Yaroslavl	KHL	47	1	18	19	24	18	2	3	5	6
2014–15	Lokomotiv Yaroslavl	KHL	60	5	20	25	26	6	0	1	1	5
2015–16	Lokomotiv Yaroslavl	KHL	60	3	22	25	16	5	1	2	3	2
2016–17	Lokomotiv Yaroslavl	KHL	52	6	12	18	18	15	3	8	11	15
2017–18	Lokomotiv Yaroslavl	KHL	55	10	25	35	10	9	2	1	3	4
2018–19	Lokomotiv Yaroslavl	KHL	54	4	7	11	18	6	3	3	6	2
2019–20	Lokomotiv Yaroslavl	KHL	46	1	8	9	49	6	0	1	1	0
SHL totals			175	13	29	42	180	35	3	3	6	22
NHL totals			66	1	3	4	23	—	—	—	—	—
KHL totals			476	44	137	181	203	77	15	24	39	46

=== International ===
Year	Team	Event	Result	GP	G	A	Pts	PIM
2002	Sweden	WJC	6th	7	0	0	0	4
2011	Sweden	WC	2nd place, silver medalist(s)	9	1	3	4	4
2012	Sweden	WC	6th	8	1	1	2	2
2013	Sweden	WC	1st place, gold medalist(s)	10	0	1	1	4
2015	Sweden	WC	5th	6	1	2	3	4
2018	Sweden	OG	5th	4	0	0	0	2
Junior totals				7	0	0	0	4
Senior totals				37	3	7	10	16

== See also ==
- Notable families in the NHL
