= Tuomas Kiiskinen =

Finnish ice hockey player

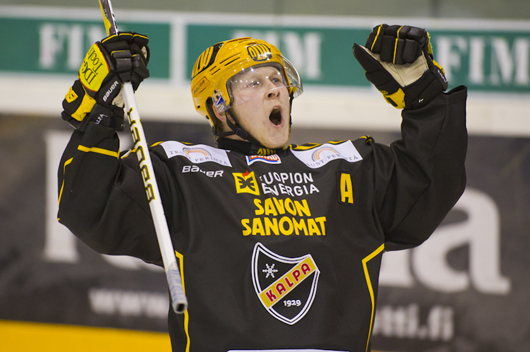
- Born: October 7, 1986 (age 38); Kuopio, Finland
- Height: 5 ft 9 in (175 cm)
- Weight: 172 lb (78 kg; 12 st 4 lb)
- Position: Forward
- Shot: Left
- Played for: KalPa; HC Donbass; Växjö Lakers; Skellefteå AIK
- National team: Finland
- Playing career: 2005–2025

Tuomas Kiiskinen (born October 7, 1986) is a Finnish former professional ice hockey player who played most notably with KalPa in the Liiga. He also played for the Växjö Lakers and Skellefteå AIK of the Swedish Hockey League (SHL). In 2015, Kiiskinen scored the goal that won Växjö the Le Mat Trophy in the second overtime against Skellefteå AIK.

== Awards and honors ==
SEASON	AWARDS BY SEASON
2004-2005	Finland2 (Mestis) Champion
	Finland2 (Mestis) to SM-Liiga Promotion (KalPa)
2005-2006	Jr. A SM-liiga Player of the Month (January)
2008-2009	SM-liiga Bronze Medal
2009-2010	SM-liiga Player of the Month (September)
2012-2013	Continental Cup Champion
2014-2015	SHL Champion
2017-2018	SHL Champion
