= Channel One Cup (ice hockey) =

International Russian ice hockey event

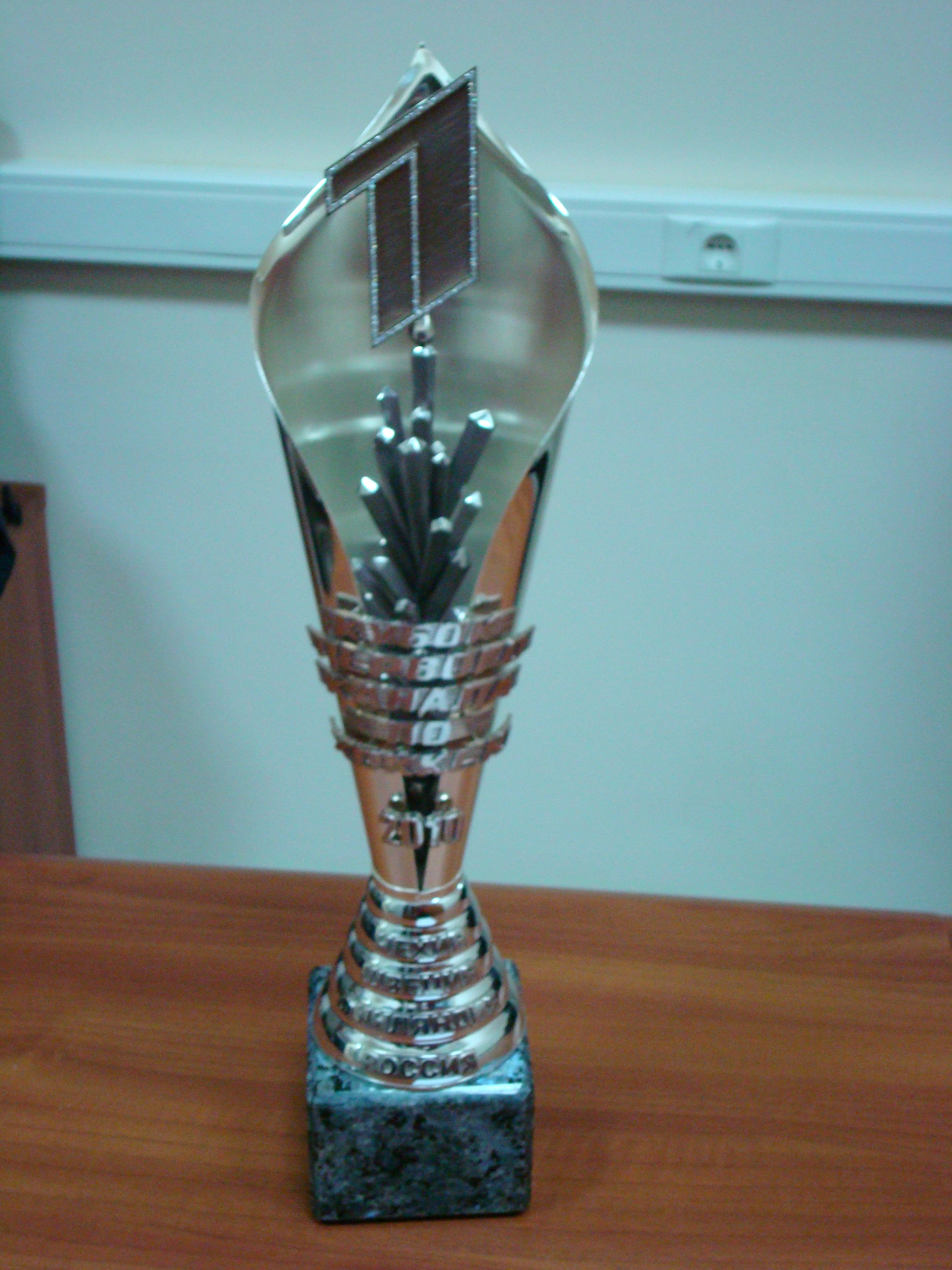
- The Channel One Cup trophy in 2010
- Status: active
- Genre: sporting event
- Date: December
- Frequency: annual
- Location: Moscow
- Country: Russia
- Inaugurated: 1967

The Channel One Cup (Russian: Кубок Первого канала, formerly Izvestia Trophy, Baltika Cup and Rosno Cup) is an annual ice hockey event held in Russia under the auspices of Channel One. It is an open tournament typically composed of various national teams.

== History ==
The tournament started in 1967 on November 30 in the Soviet Union. The first edition of the tournament was held in honour of the 50th anniversary of the Soviet state. Six teams participated in that tournament; two Soviet teams, two Czechoslovak teams, a Canadian team and a Polish team. Swedish and Western German teams declined the invitation.

It has typically been held every year in December in Moscow. No matches were held in the capital in 2013 and 2014, when most of the games were held in Sochi; in 2023 and 2024, when the tournament was held in Saint Petersburg; in 2025, when the tournament was held in Novosibirsk; and in 1991, when the tournament was not held at all due to the collapse of the Soviet Union.

In 1967, some games were held in Leningrad and Voskresensk. In 1992, Moscow and Saint Petersburg split the tournament's hosting. Saint Petersburg also hosted one game each in 2018 and 2019.

The 2002, 2005–2019, and 2021 tournaments each featured one game held outside of Russia. They were hosted in various cities in the Czech Republic, Finland, and Sweden. The tournament during the 1974/1975 season had a different format, with games spread out during the season since September to March (except October and January) and equally divided between the USSR, Sweden, Finland, and Czechoslovakia.

During the 1970s and 1980s, the cup was often commonly referred to as "The Little World Championships". From 1996 to 2021 it was part of the Euro Hockey Tour.

In 2022, due to the Russian invasion of Ukraine, the tournament was removed from the Euro Hockey Tour. To replace the countries that had pulled out, Kazakhstan made its tournament debuts, and Belarus played in the tournament alongside a Russian team.

=== Tournament name ===
The name of the tournament has changed several times during its history:

- International Ice Hockey Tournament (1967–1968)
- Izvestia Trophy (1969–1996)
- Baltica Brewery Cup (1997–2003)
- Rosno Cup (2004–2005)
- Channel One Cup (2006–present)

== Results ==
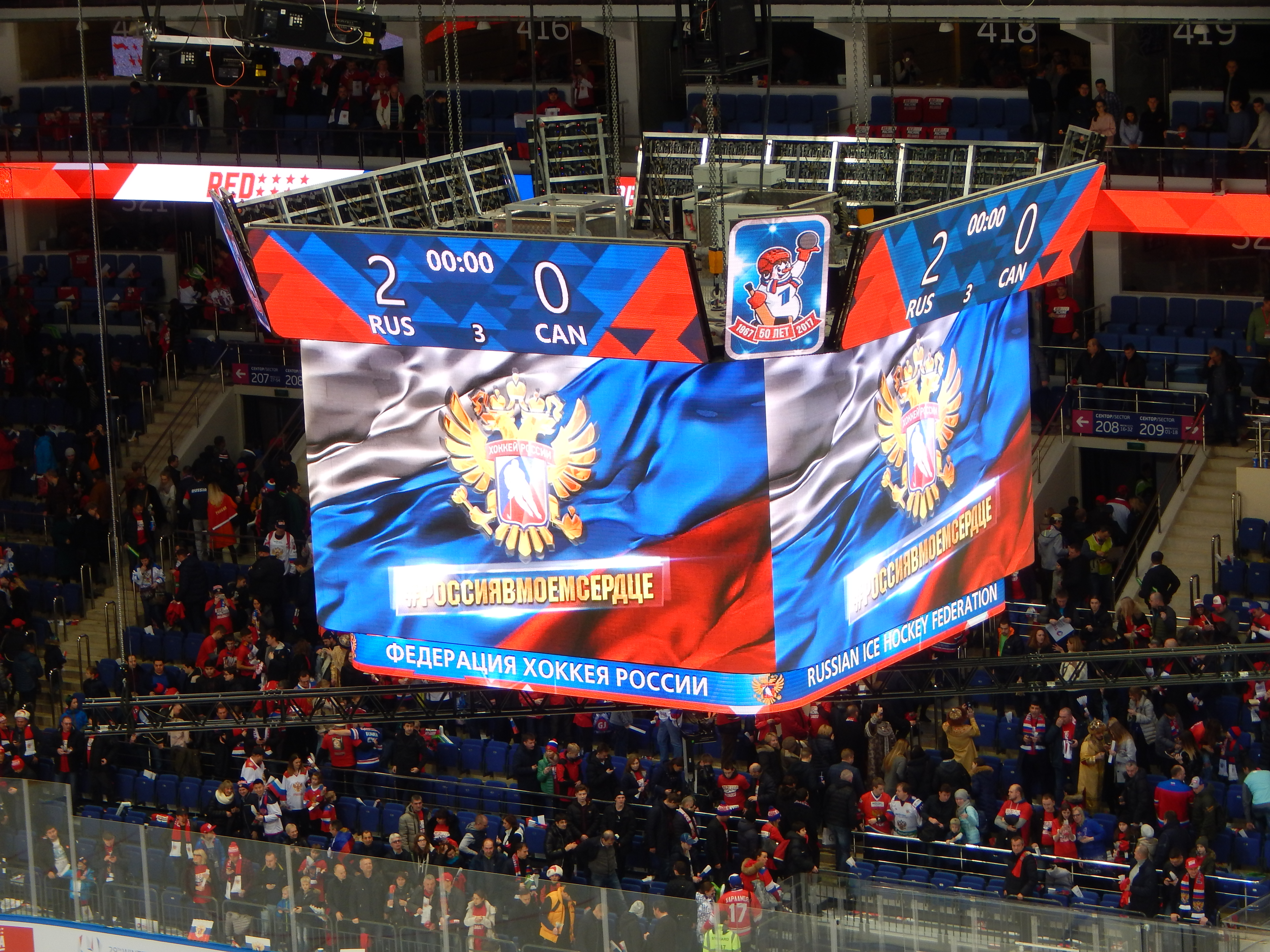
The 2017 tournament (Russia vs Canada)

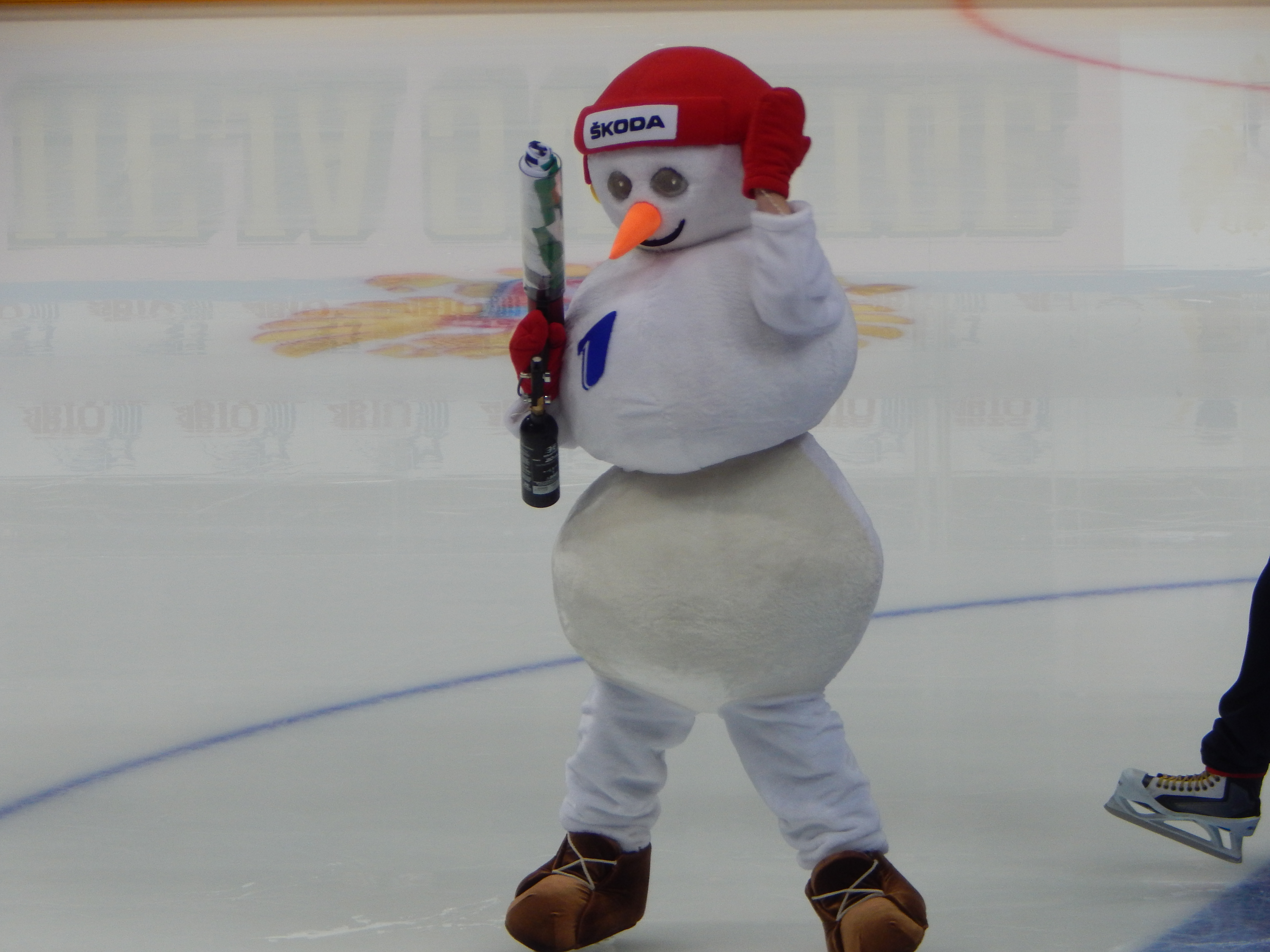
Snowman has been the traditional mascot of the tournament

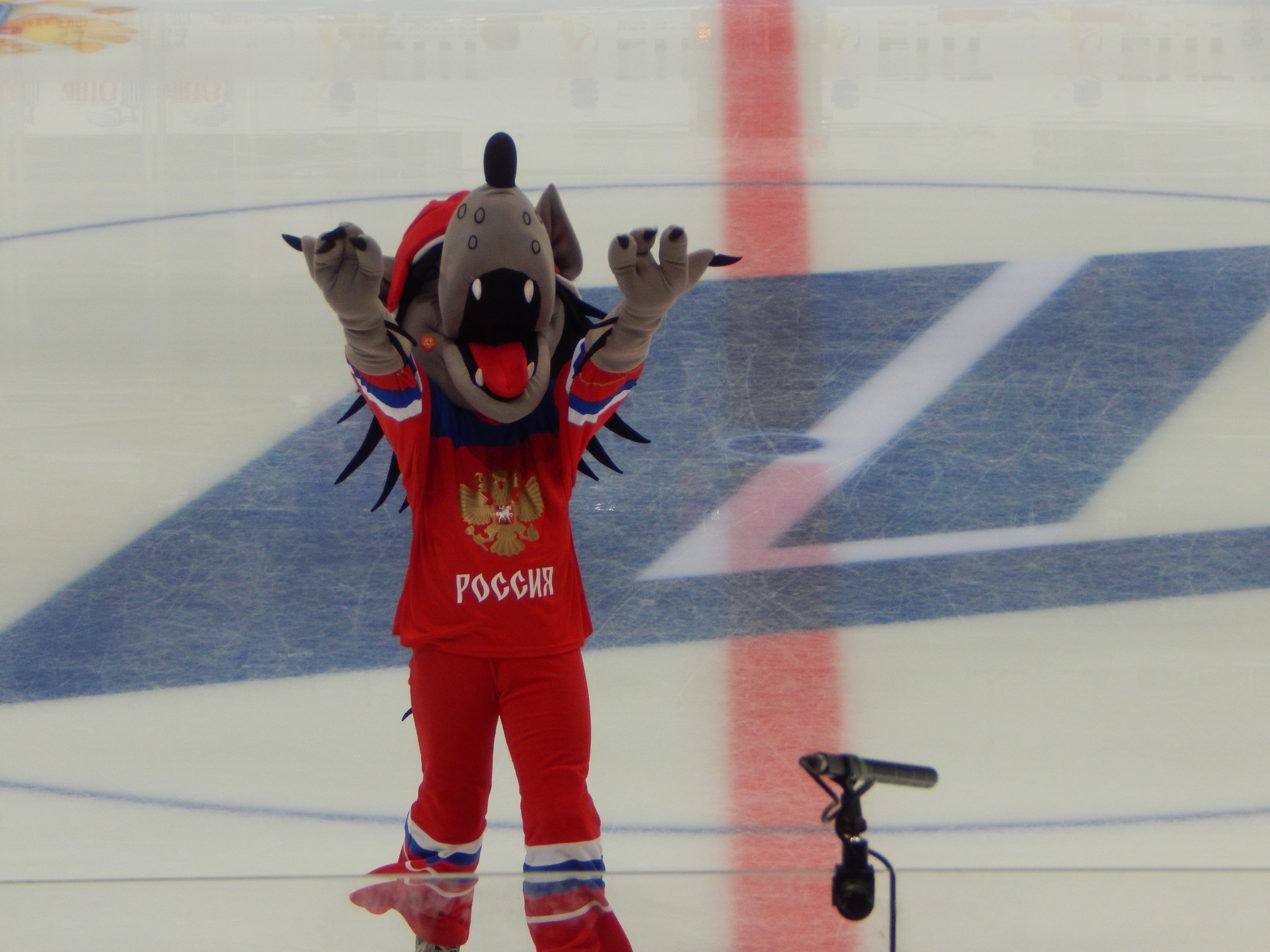
Wolf (Volk) has been the Russian ice hockey mascot

Final standings in the most events are determined in a round-robin tournament. If teams are tied in points, the standing is determined by the result of the game between the tied teams.

In 1974-1975 there was a sextuple round-robin tournament.

In 1980, 1981, 1997 there were a final and the 3rd place game.

In 1992, 1993 and 1994 there were two groups instead of a round-robin tournament and there were a final and the 3rd place game. In 1992 and 1994 there were also the 5th place game and the 7th place game.

In 2017 six teams played three matches each in the group tournament.

In 2021 Russia played four matches, while the other teams played three matches each. Places were determined based on a percentage of points scored.

Year	Cities	Winner	Runner-up	3rd place	4th place and below
1967	Moscow, Leningrad, Voskresensk	Soviet Union I	Soviet Union II	Czechoslovakia II	4. Czechoslovakia I, 5. Canada, 6. Poland
1968	Moscow	Soviet Union I	Soviet Union II	Finland	Canada
1969	Moscow	Soviet Union	Canada	Czechoslovakia	4. Sweden, 5. Finland, 6. East Germany
1970	Moscow	Czechoslovakia	Soviet Union	Sweden	4. Finland, 5. Poland
1971	Moscow	Soviet Union	Czechoslovakia	Finland	Sweden
1972	Moscow	Soviet Union	Czechoslovakia	Sweden	4. Finland, 5. Poland
1973	Moscow	Soviet Union	Czechoslovakia	Finland	4. Poland, 5. Sweden
1974-1975	Moscow, Pori, Rauma, Turku, Tampere, Helsinki, Prague, Stockholm, Södertälje, Gothenburg	Czechoslovakia	Soviet Union	Sweden	Finland
1975	Moscow	Soviet Union	Czechoslovakia	Sweden	Finland
1976	Moscow	Soviet Union	Sweden	Czechoslovakia	4. (Canada) Winnipeg Jets, 5. Finland
1977	Moscow	Czechoslovakia	Soviet Union	Sweden	4. Finland, 5. (Canada) Quebec Nordiques
1978	Moscow	Soviet Union	Czechoslovakia	Canada	4. Sweden, 5. Finland
1979	Moscow	Soviet Union	Czechoslovakia	Finland	4. Sweden, 5. Canada
1980	Moscow	Soviet Union	Czechoslovakia	Finland	Sweden
1981	Moscow	Soviet Union	Czechoslovakia	Sweden	Finland
1982	Moscow	Soviet Union	Finland	Czechoslovakia	4. Sweden, 5. West Germany
1983	Moscow	Soviet Union	Czechoslovakia	Sweden	4. Finland, 5. Canada
1984	Moscow	Soviet Union	Czechoslovakia	Finland	4. Sweden, 5. West Germany
1985	Moscow	Czechoslovakia	Soviet Union	Sweden	4. Canada, 5. Finland
1986	Moscow	Soviet Union	Canada	Sweden	4. Czechoslovakia, 5. Finland
1987	Moscow	Canada	Soviet Union	Sweden	4. Czechoslovakia, 5. Finland, 6. West Germany
1988	Moscow	Soviet Union	Sweden	Czechoslovakia	4. Canada, 5. Finland
1989	Moscow	Soviet Union	Czechoslovakia	Finland	4. Canada, 5. Germany, 6. Sweden
1990	Moscow	Soviet Union	Sweden	Czechoslovakia	4. Finland, 5. Canada
1991		No tournament held due to the dissolution of the Soviet Union.			
1992	Moscow, Saint Petersburg	Russia II	Czechoslovakia	Russia I	4. Sweden, 5 Finland, 6. Switzerland, 7. Canada, 8. Germany
1993	Moscow	Russia I	Russia II	Sweden	4. United States, 5-6. Czech Republic, France, 7-8. Finland, Canada, 9-10. Norway, Belarus
1994	Moscow	Russia	Czech Republic	Finland	4. Sweden, 5. Norway, 6. Italy, 7. France, 8. Switzerland
1995	Moscow	Russia	Czech Republic	Sweden	4. Canada, 5. Finland
Part of the Euro Hockey Tour
1996	Moscow	Sweden	Russia	Finland	4. Czech Republic, 5. Canada
1997	Moscow	Czech Republic	Russia	Sweden	Finland
1998	Moscow	Sweden	Czech Republic	Finland	4. Russia, 5. Canada
1999	Moscow	Russia	Czech Republic	Finland	4. Sweden, 5. Canada
2000	Moscow	Russia	Czech Republic	Finland	Sweden
2001	Moscow	Czech Republic	Russia	Sweden	Finland
2002	Moscow, Espoo	Czech Republic	Finland	Russia	4. Slovakia, 5. Sweden
2003	Moscow	Finland	Czech Republic	Russia	Sweden
2004	Moscow	Russia	Finland	Czech Republic	Sweden
2005	Moscow, Prague	Russia	Finland	Sweden	Czech Republic
2006	Moscow, Helsinki	Russia	Finland	Sweden	Czech Republic
2007	Moscow, Prague	Russia	Finland	Czech Republic	Sweden
2008	Moscow, Malmö	Russia	Finland	Czech Republic	Sweden
2009	Moscow, Prague	Finland	Russia	Czech Republic	Sweden
2010	Moscow, Espoo	Russia	Czech Republic	Sweden	Finland
2011	Moscow, Chomutov	Sweden	Czech Republic	Russia	Finland
2012	Moscow, Helsinki	Russia	Sweden	Finland	Czech Republic
2013	Sochi, Prague	Czech Republic	Finland	Russia	Sweden
2014	Sochi, Prague	Russia	Finland	Sweden	Czech Republic
2015	Moscow, Prague	Czech Republic	Sweden	Finland	Russia
2016	Moscow, Helsinki	Sweden	Russia	Finland	Czech Republic
2017	Moscow, Prague	Russia	Czech Republic	Finland	4. Sweden, 5. Canada, 6. South Korea
2018	Moscow, Saint Petersburg, Tampere	Russia	Finland	Sweden	Czech Republic
2019	Moscow, Saint Petersburg, Plzeň	Sweden	Russia	Finland	Czech Republic
2020	Moscow	Russia	Sweden	Finland	Czech Republic
2021	Moscow, Prague	Finland	Russia	Canada	4. Sweden, 5. Czech Republic
No longer part of the Euro Hockey Tour
2022	Moscow	Belarus	Russia	Kazakhstan	—
2023	Saint Petersburg	Russia 25	Belarus	Kazakhstan	(Russia) Stars and VHL
2024	Saint Petersburg	Russia 25	Belarus	World Team KHL	Kazakhstan
2025	Novosibirsk	Russia 25	Belarus	Kazakhstan	—

In 1967 the USSR and Czechoslovakia teams were divided arbitrary into the first and the second teams — the strongest players were simply spread between them. Canada was represented by the Eastern branches team.

In 1968 the USSR II team was consisted from young promising players.

In 1971 Sweden was represented by Sweden B national team "Vikings".

In 1990 and 1992 Czechoslovakia represented Czech and Slovak Federative Republic instead Czechoslovak Socialist Republic.

In 1992 and 1993 Russia II team was also named as Olympic Russia national team.

In 1995 Finland was represented by Finland B national team.

In 2023, 2024 and 2025 the Russia 25 team included players over 25 years old and did not use the U25 designation.

In 2023 Stars and VHL team included Russian players from VHL and KHL.

In 2024 World Team KHL team included foreign players from KHL.

== Medal table ==
Pos	Team	Gold	Silver	Bronze	Total
1	Soviet Union; Soviet Union I Russia; Russia I Russia 25	38	13	5	56
2	Czechoslovakia; Czech Republic	9	21	9	39
3	Sweden	5	6	19	30
4	Finland	3	10	18	31
5	Soviet Union II; Russia II	1	3	0	4
6	Belarus	1	3	0	4
7	Canada	1	2	2	5
8	Kazakhstan	0	0	3	3
9	Czechoslovakia II	0	0	1	1
10	World Team KHL	0	0	1	1
