= 2016 Karjala Tournament =

2016 Karjala Tournament (Euro Hockey Games)
Tournament details
- Host countries: Finland; Czechia
- Cities: Helsinki; Plzeň
- Venues: 2 (in 2 host cities)
- Dates: 3–6 November 2016
- Teams: 4

Final positions
- Champions: Russia (7th title)
- Runners-up: Czech Republic
- Third place: Finland
- Fourth place: Sweden

Tournament statistics
- Games played: 6
- Goals scored: 36 (6 per game)
- Attendance: 38,389 (6,398 per game)
- Scoring leader: (Czech Republic) Lukáš Radil (5 points)

The 2016 Karjala Tournament was played between 3 and 6 November 2016. The Czech Republic, Finland, Sweden and Russia played a round-robin for a total of three games per team and six games in total. Five of the matches were played in the Hartwall Arena in Helsinki, Finland, and one match in the CEZ Arena in Plzeň, Czech Republic. The tournament was won by Russia. The tournament was part of 2016–17 Euro Hockey Tour.

== Standings ==
Pos	Team	Pld	W	OTW	OTL	L	GF	GA	GD	Pts
1	Russia	3	3	0	0	0	11	3	+8	9
2	Czech Republic	3	2	0	0	1	11	9	+2	6
3	Finland	3	1	0	0	2	8	11	−3	3
4	Sweden	3	0	0	0	3	6	13	−7	0

Source: Swehockey

== Games ==
All times are local. Helsinki – (Eastern European Time – UTC+2) Plzeň – (Central European Time – UTC+1)

3 November 2016; 18:00	Czech Republic	6–3 (2–1, 1–1, 3–1)	Sweden	CEZ Arena, Plzeň; Attendance: 6,813

Game reference

Dominik Furch
Goalies
Joel Lassinantti
Referees:
(Russia) Michail Buturlin
(Russia) Evgeny Naumov
Linesmen:
(Czech Republic) Jiří Ondráček
(Czech Republic) Libor Suchánek

J. Jeřábek (J. Kovář, A. Polášek) – 00:29	1–0
R. Jarůšek (M. Kvapil) – 09:40	2–0
	2–1	16:21 – R. Gynge
L. Radil (D. Kubalík, J. Rutta) – 23:09	3–1
	3–2	37:37 – J. Lundgvist (N. Andersson)
L. Radil (J. Kovář) – 40:27	4–2
J. Kovář (D. Kubalík) – 48:21	5–2
	5–3	52:01 – P. Zackrisson (J. Ahnelöv, R. Gynge)
D. Kubalík (J. Kovář) (PP) – 59:16	6–3

6 min
Penalties
8 min
39
Shots
20

3 November 2015; 18:30	Russia	5–1 (1–0, 0–1, 4–0)	Finland	Hartwall Arena, Helsinki; Attendance: 7,025

Game reference

Ilya Sorokin
Goalies
Harri Säteri, Mikko Koskinen
Referees:
(Sweden) Mikael Sjöqvist
(Sweden) Andreas Harnebring
Linesmen:
(Finland) Markus Hägerström
(Finland) Sakari Suominen

A. Golyshev (V. Nichushkin, B. Kiselevich) – 13:21	1–0
	1–1	M. Aaltonen (S. Salminen, J. Joensuu) (PP) – 31–12
A. Svetlakov (B. Kiselevich, V. Nichushkin) – 49:51	2–1
A. Golyshev (V. Nichushkin) – 53:05	3–1
N. Gusev (A. Barabanov) – 58:58	4–1
V. Tkachev – 59:46	5–1

4 min
Penalties
6 min
34
Shots
23

5 November 2015; 13:30	Sweden	2–3 (0–1, 1–1, 1–1)	Russia	Hartwall Arena, Helsinki; Attendance: 4,111

Game reference

Niklas Svedberg
Goalies
Igor Shestyorkin
Referees:
(Finland) Stefan Fonselius
(Finland) Lassi Heikkinen
Linesmen:
(Finland) Masi Puolakka
(Finland) Lauri Nikulainen

	0–1	R. Rafikov (V. Tkachev, S. Shumakov) – 19:35
	0–2	A. Barabanov (N. Gusev) – 23:52
R. Gynge (A. Bergström, H. Tömmernes) (PP) – 24:44	1–2
	1–3	A. Svetlakov (SH) – 48:19
C. Klingberg (F. Pettersson, L. Hultström) (PP) – 49:19	2–3

12 min
Penalties
8 min
27
Shots
26

5 November 2015; 17:30	Finland	3–5 (0–0, 1–3, 2–2)	Czech Republic	Hartwall Arena, Helsinki; Attendance: 9,762

Game reference

Harri Säteri
Goalies
Simon Hrubec
Referees:
(Sweden) Mikael Sjöqvist
(Sweden) Andreas Harnebring
Linesmen:
(Finland) Hannu Sormunen
(Finland) Henri Neva

V.M. Savinainen (P. Jormakka) – 21:11	1–0
	1–1	P. Holík (J. Jeřábek, T. Zohorna) – 25:12
	1–2	A. Polášek (L. Radil, J. Jeřábek) (PP) – 30:30
	1–3	J. Rutta (D. Kubalík, L. Radil) (PP) – 33:25
J. Kemppainen (V. Lajunen, I. Filppula) (PP) – 43:52	2–3
	2–4	J. Jeřábek
V. Lajunen (I. Melart, I. Filppula) – 49:19	3–4
	3–5	L. Radil (D. Kubalík, R. Horák) – 59:02

8 min
Penalties
6 min
22
Shots
32

6 November 2015; 13:30	Czech Republic	0–3 (0–0, 0–2, 0–1)	Russia	Hartwall Arena, Helsinki; Attendance: 2,656

Game reference

Dominik Furch
Goalies
Ilya Sorokin
Referees:
(Finland) Anssi Kalevi Salonen
(Finland) Mikko Kaukokari
Linesmen:
(Finland) Pasi Nieminen
(Finland) Timo Heinonen

0–1	V. Tkachev (S. Sannikov) (SH) – 25:51
0–2	N. Gusev (N. Prokhorkin, V. Antipin) (PP) – 37:03
0–3	A. Bereglazov (N. Gusev) – 49:03

18 min
Penalties
6 min
32
Shots
23

6 November 2015; 17:30	Finland	4–1 (0–1, 4–0, 0–0)	Sweden	Hartwall Arena, Helsinki; Attendance: 8,022

Game reference

Mikko Koskinen
Goalies
Joel Lassinantti, Niklas Svedberg
Referees:
(Czech Republic) Daniel Pražák
(Czech Republic) Pavel Hodek
Linesmen:
(Finland) Jani Pesonen
(Finland) Sakari Suominen

	0–1	P. Cehlin (M. Sjögren, S. Kronwall) – 14:50
J. Kemppainen (A. Elorinne, M. Pyörälä) – 24:46	1–1
M. Aaltonen (V. Lajunen, I. Melart) – 25:15	2–1
M. Pyöörälä (I. Filppula) – 26:37	3–1
V. M. Savinainen (P. Jormakka, L. Kukkonen) – 33:38	4–1

12 min
Penalties
8 min
27
Shots
20

== Scoring leaders ==
Pos	Player	Country	GP	G	A	Pts	+/−	PIM	POS
1	Lukáš Radil	Czech Republic	3	3	2	5	+5	4	RW
2	Dominik Kubalík	Czech Republic	3	1	4	5	+5	2	LW
3	Nikita Gusev	Russia	3	2	2	4	+3	2	RW
4	Jakub Jeřábek	Czech Republic	3	2	2	4	+1	12	RD
5	Jan Kovář	Czech Republic	1	1	3	4	+4	0	LW
6	Vladimir Tkachev	Russia	3	2	1	3	+3	0	LW
7	Richard Gynge	Sweden	3	2	1	3	–2	0	LW
8	Ville Lajunen	Finland	3	1	2	3	0	0	RD
9	Valeri Nichushkin	Russia	3	0	3	3	+5	0	LW
10	Ilari Filppula	Finland	3	0	3	3	+1	2	CE

GP = Games played; G = Goals; A = Assists; Pts = Points; +/− = Plus/minus; PIM = Penalties in minutes; POS = Position
Source: Swehockey

== Goaltending leaders ==
Pos	Player	Country	TOI	GA	GAA	Sv%	SO
1	Ilya Sorokin	Russia	120:00	1	0.50	98.18	1
2	Mikko Koskinen	Finland	81:52	2	4.34	93.33	0
3	Igor Shestyorkin	Russia	60:00	2	2.00	92.59	0
4	Niklas Svedberg	Sweden	59:41	3	3.02	88.46	0
5	Harri Säteri	Finland	96:45	7	4.34	87.04	0

TOI = Time On Ice (minutes:seconds); SA = Shots against; GA = Goals against; GAA = Goals against average; Sv% = Save percentage; SO = Shutouts
Source: Swehockey
