= 2015 Channel One Cup =

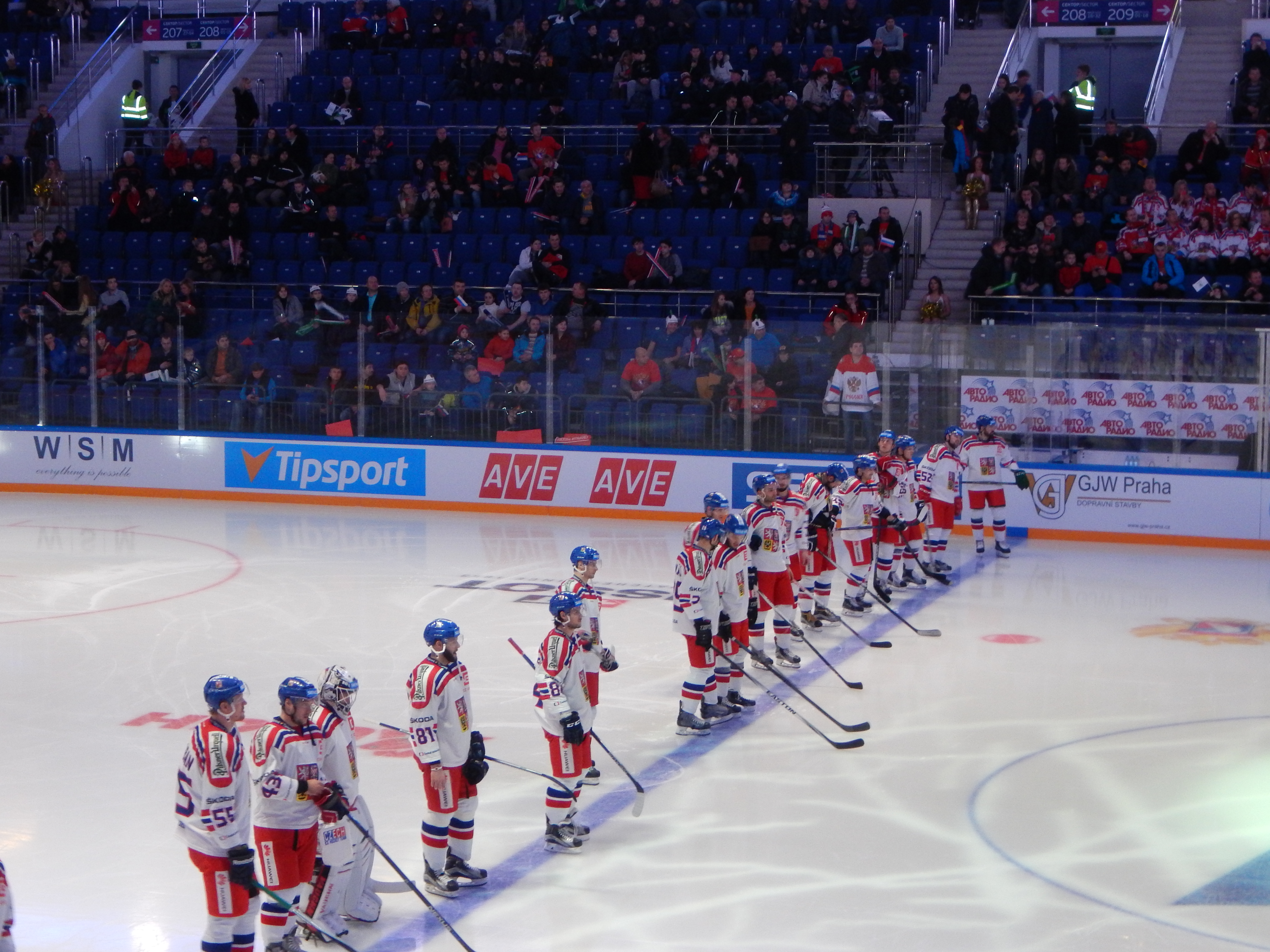
- Czech Republic wins the Cup

Tournament details
- Host countries: Russia; Czechia
- Cities: Moscow; Prague
- Venues: 2 (in 2 host cities)
- Dates: 17–20 December 2015
- Teams: 4

Final positions
- Champions: Czech Republic (9th title)
- Runners-up: Sweden
- Third place: Finland
- Fourth place: Russia

Tournament statistics
- Games played: 6
- Goals scored: 30 (5 per game)
- Attendance: 64,170 (10,695 per game)
- Scoring leader: (Russia) Alexander Radulov (5 points)

The 2015 Channel One Cup was played between 17 and 20 December 2015. The Czech Republic, Finland, Sweden and Russia played a round-robin for a total of three games per team and six games in total. Five of the matches were played in the VTB Ice Palace in Moscow, Russia, and one match in the O2 Arena in Prague, Czech Republic. The tournament was part of 2015–16 Euro Hockey Tour. Tournament was won by Czech Republic before Sweden, Finland and Russia.

== Standings ==
Pos	Team	Pld	W	OTW	OTL	L	GF	GA	GD	Pts
1	Czech Republic	3	2	0	0	1	7	6	+1	6
2	Sweden	3	1	1	0	1	7	5	+2	5
3	Finland	3	1	0	1	1	5	10	−5	4
4	Russia	3	1	0	0	2	11	9	+2	3

Source: eurohockey

== Games ==
All times are local. Moscow – (Moscow Time – UTC+3) Prague – (Central European Time – UTC+1)

17 December 2015; 18:30	Czech Republic	0–3 (0–0, 0–1, 0–2)	Finland	O2 Arena, Prague; Attendance: 16,257

Game reference

Dominik Furch
Goalies
Harri Säteri
Referees:
(Sweden) Tobias Björk
(Sweden) Linus Öhnlund
Linesmen:
(Czech Republic) Rudolf Tošenovjan
(Czech Republic) Vit Lederer

0–1	32:46 – O. Palola
0–2	42:04 – M. Nutivaara (I. Filppula)
0–3	57:27 – J. Enlund (T. Sallinen) (EN)

6 min
Penalties
2 min
28
Shots
20

17 December 2015; 19:00	Russia	1–4 (0–0, 1–3, 0–1)	Sweden	VTB Ice Palace, Moscow; Attendance: 12,194

Game reference

Ilya Sorokin
Goalies
Viktor Fasth
Referees:
(Czech Republic) Robin Sir
(Czech Republic) Pavel Hodek
Linesmen:
(Russia) Dmitry Sivov
(Russia) Sergey Shelyanin

M. Chudinov (A. Radulov, D. Zaripov) (PP) – 21:04	1–0
	1–1	26:57 – A. Petersson (P. Hersley, L. Omark) (PP2)
	1–2	29:33 – J. Ahnelöv (L. Omark, D. Rahimi)
	1–3	33:15 – J. Norman (D. Rahimi, A. Johnson)
	1–4	59:36 – O. Möller (M. Sjögren) (EN)

22 min
Penalties
20 min
31
Shots
24

19 December 2015; 14:00	Finland	1–8 (0–4, 1–3, 0–1)	Russia	VTB Ice Palace, Moscow; Attendance: 12,034

Game reference

~~Jussi Rynnäs~~
Harri Säteri
Goalies
Vasily Koshechkin
Referees:
(Czech Republic) Pavel Hodek
(Czech Republic) Robin Sir
Linesmen:
(Russia) Dmitry Sivov
(Russia) Sergey Shelyanin

	0–1	01:26 – D. Zaripov (S. Mozyakin)
	0–2	01:47 – D. Apalkov (I. Grigorenko)
	0–3	06:23 – A. Radulov (B. Kiselevich, V. Shipachyov)
	0–4	12:46 – A. Radulov (I. Kovalchuk, V. Shipachyov)
	0–5	29:21 – M. Chudinov (V. Antipin, S. Mozyakin)
A. Pihlström (V. Lajunen, I. Filppula) (PP) – 34:34	1–5
	1–6	36:17 – I. Kovalchuk (V. Antipin, M. Chudinov)
	1–7	39:12 – I. Kovalchuk (A. Radulov, D. Vishnevsky)
	1–8	55:05 – D. Zaripov (E. Yakovlev, V. Shipachyov)

2 min
Penalties
8 min
24
Shots
31

19 December 2015; 18:00	Sweden	1–3 (0–0, 1–0, 0–2)	Czech Republic	VTB Ice Palace, Moscow; Attendance: 6,250

Game reference

Markus Svensson
Goalies
Pavel Francouz
Referees:
(Russia) Alexey Anisimiov
(Russia) Vyacheslav Bulanov
Linesmen:
(Russia) Gleb Lazarov
(Russia) Alexander Otmakhov

O. Möller (J. Lindström, M. Sjögren) (PP)	1–0
	1–1	30:59 – T. Vincour (L. Radil, J. Jeřábek)
	1–2	49:29 – T. Filippi (M. Doudera) (PP)
	1–3	55:27 – T. Zohorna (L. Radil)

10 min
Penalties
6 min
14
Shots
15

20 December 2015; 14:00	Russia	2–4 (0–1, 2–3, 0–0)	Czech Republic	VTB Ice Palace, Moscow; Attendance: 12,095

Game reference

Alexei Murygin
Goalies
Dominik Furch
Referees:
(Finland) Aleksi Rantala
(Finland) Stefan Fonselius
Linesmen:
(Russia) Dmitry Sivov
(Russia) Sergey Shelyanin

	0–1	05:26 – T. Vincour (P. Koukal)
V. Kartayev (N. Gusev, E. Dadonov) – 22:28	1–1
V. Antipin (I. Kovalchuk, A. Radulov) – 25:09	2–1
	2–2	27:29 – T. Kundrátek (M. Gulaš)
	2–3	34:20 – M. Zaťovič (J. Kovář) (PP)
	2–4	39:09 – R. Jarusek

6 min
Penalties
2 min
21
Shots
22

20 December 2015; 18:00	Finland	1–2 GWS (0–0, 0–1, 1–0) (OT 0–0) (SO: 0–1)	Sweden	VTB Ice Palace, Moscow; Attendance: 5,340

Game reference
Harri Säteri	Goalies	Viktor Fasth	Referees: (Russia) Roman Gofman (Russia) Konstantin Olenin; Linesmen: (Russia) Gleb Lazarov (Russia) Alexander Otmakhov
/ 0–1 / 39:07 – L. Wallmark (S. Kronwall, A. Engqvist) (PP); J. Enlund (K. Kuusela, V. Lajunen) – 45:25 / 1–1			Referees: (Russia) Roman Gofman (Russia) Konstantin Olenin; Linesmen: (Russia) Gleb Lazarov (Russia) Alexander Otmakhov
I. Filppula (miss); E. Elo (miss)	Shootout	A. Petersson; (miss) O. Möller; L. Omark	Referees: (Russia) Roman Gofman (Russia) Konstantin Olenin; Linesmen: (Russia) Gleb Lazarov (Russia) Alexander Otmakhov
6 min	Penalties	8 min	Referees: (Russia) Roman Gofman (Russia) Konstantin Olenin; Linesmen: (Russia) Gleb Lazarov (Russia) Alexander Otmakhov
25	Shots	29	Referees: (Russia) Roman Gofman (Russia) Konstantin Olenin; Linesmen: (Russia) Gleb Lazarov (Russia) Alexander Otmakhov

== Scoring leaders ==
Pos	Player	Country	GP	G	A	Pts	+/−	PIM	POS
1	Alexander Radulov	Russia	3	2	3	5	+4	16	F
2	Ilya Kovalchuk	Russia	3	2	2	4	+2	6	F
3	Maxim Chudinov	Russia	3	2	1	3	+2	0	D
4	Danis Zaripov	Russia	3	2	1	3	+2	0	F
5	Viktor Antipin	Russia	3	1	2	3	+2	0	D

GP = Games played; G = Goals; A = Assists; Pts = Points; +/− = Plus/minus; PIM = Penalties in minutes; POS = Position
Source: quanthockey

== Goaltending leaders ==
Pos	Player	Country	TOI	GA	GAA	Sv%	SO
1	Viktor Fasth	Sweden	125:00	2	0.96	96.67	0
2	Harri Säteri	Finland	178:37	6	2.02	91.67	1
3	Dominik Furch	Czech Republic	119:48	4	2.00	89.47	0

TOI = Time on ice (minutes:seconds); SA = Shots against; GA = Goals against; GAA = Goals Against Average; Sv% = Save percentage; SO = Shutouts
Source: swehockey

== Gallery ==
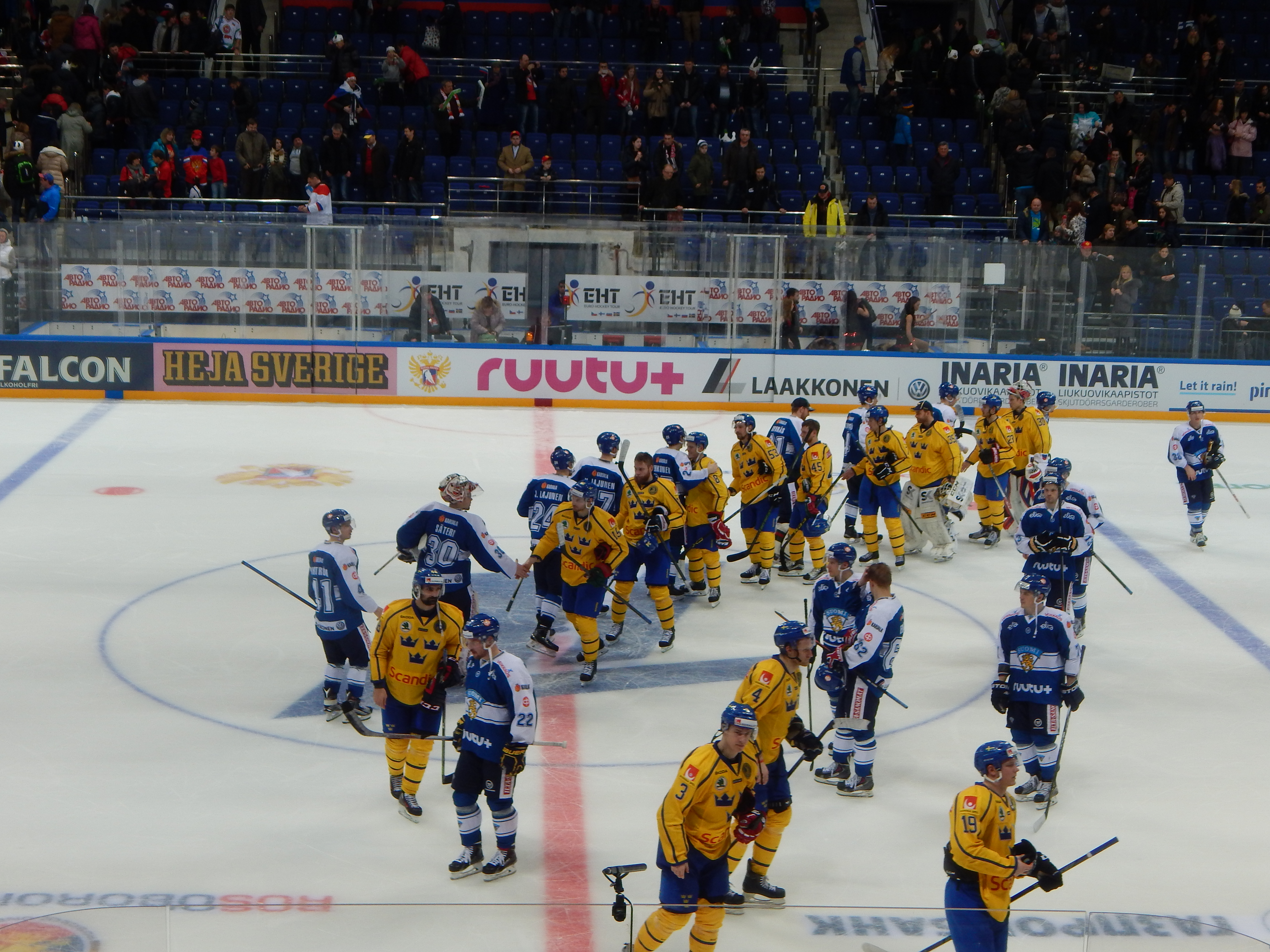
After the match between Sweden and Finland

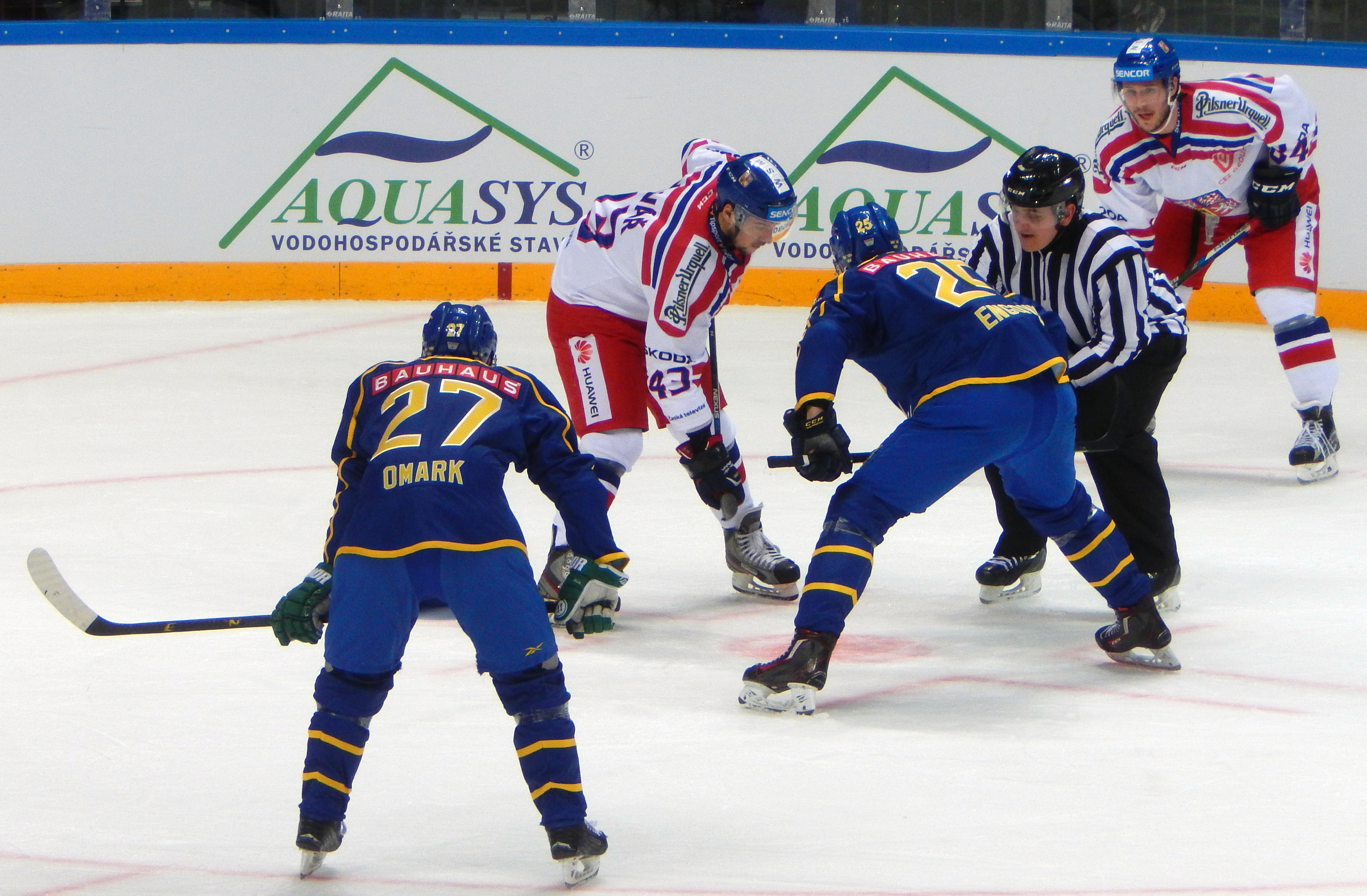
A face-off in the match between Sweden and Czech Republic

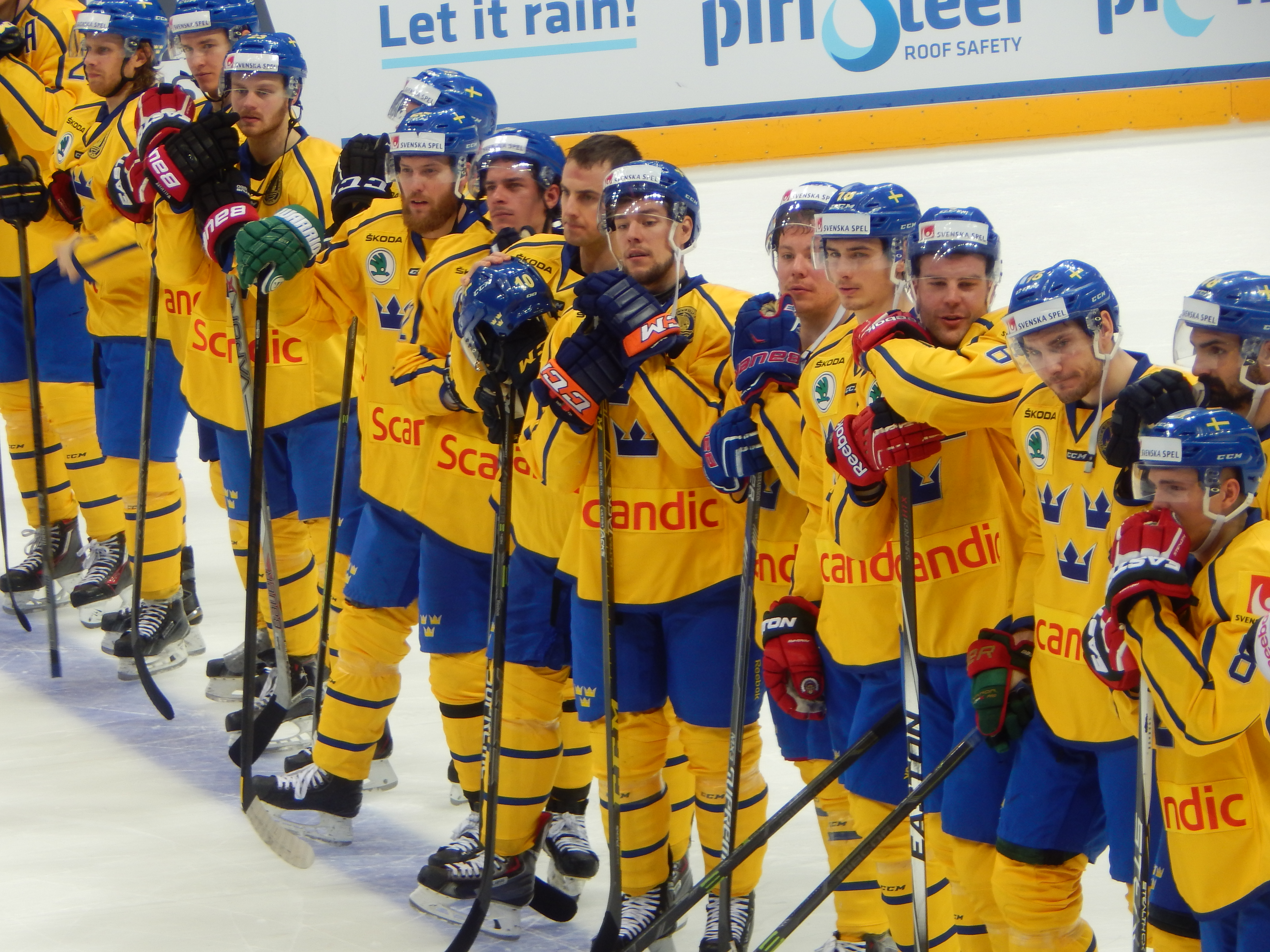
Team Sweden wins silver medals at 2015 Channel One Cup

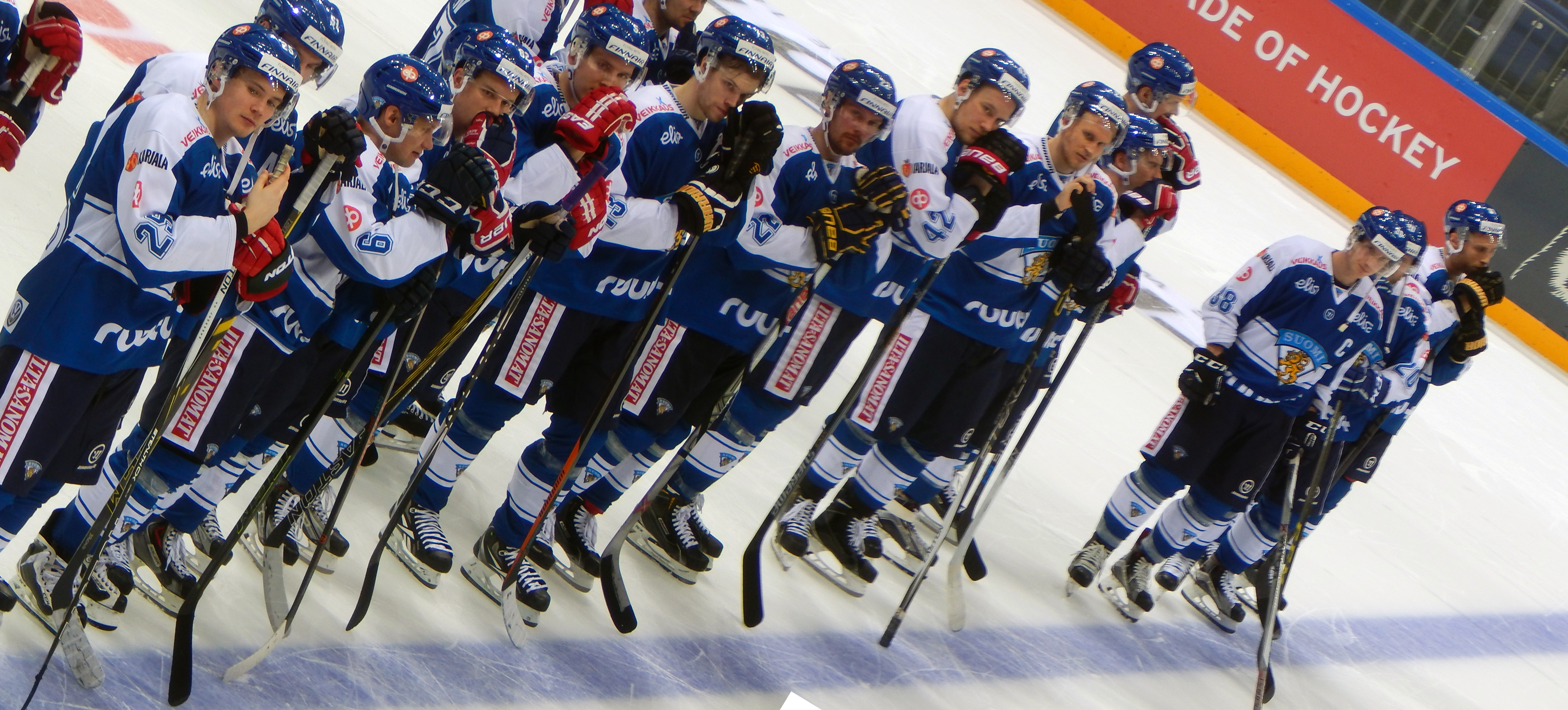
Team Finland finishes third

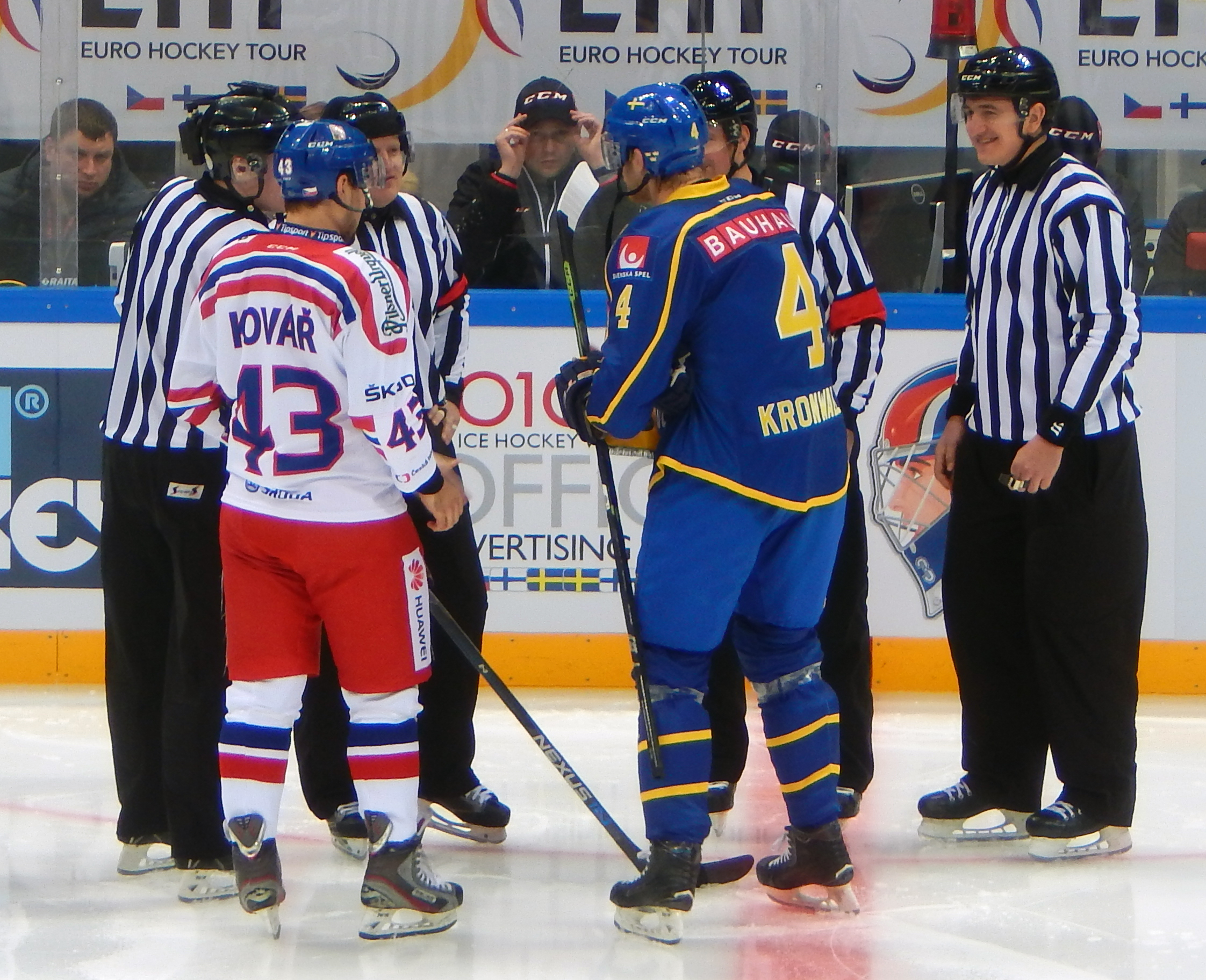
Kovar and Kronwall talk to referees before start of the match between Czech Republic and Sweden

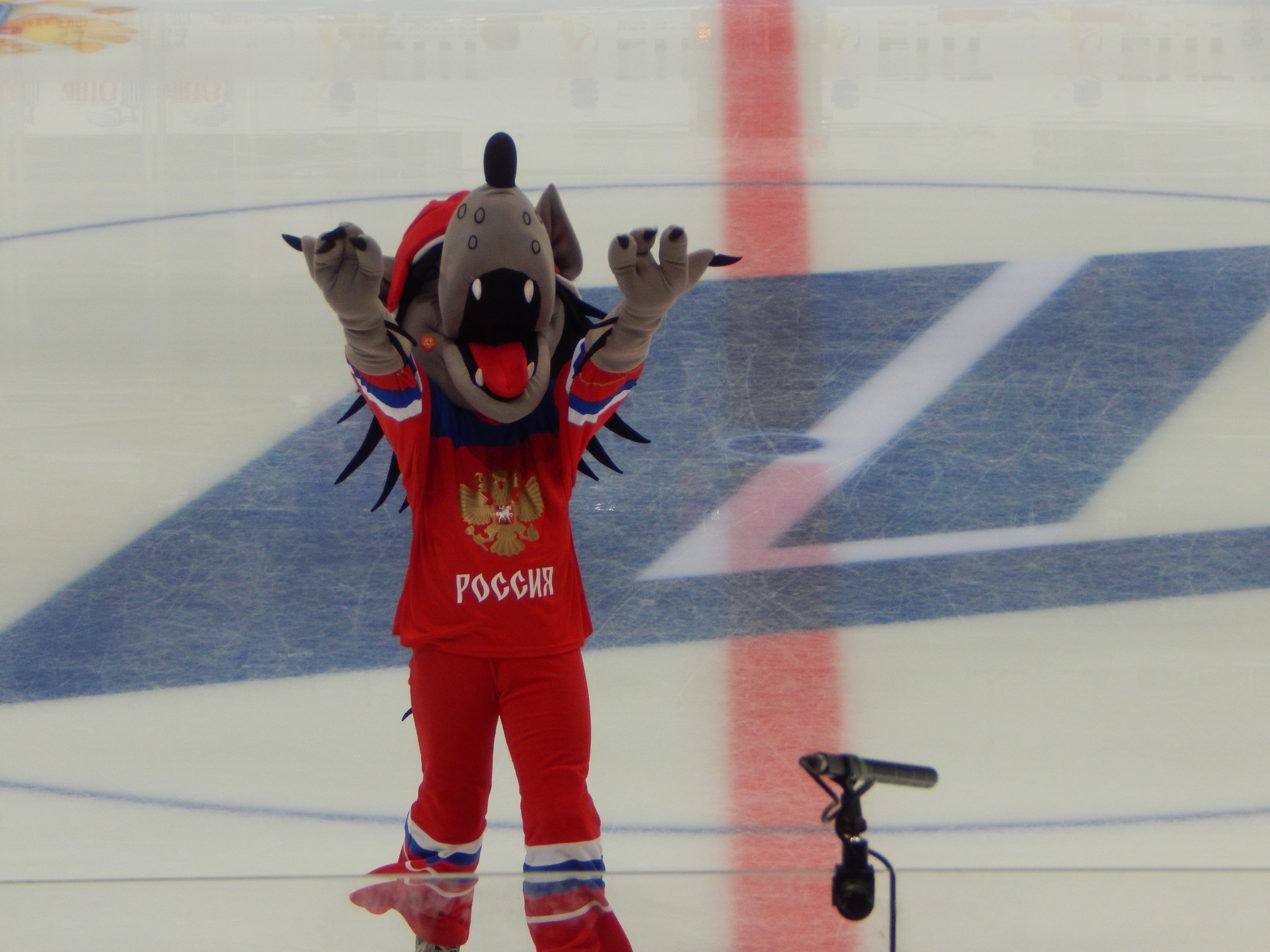
Wolf, a mascot of Cup

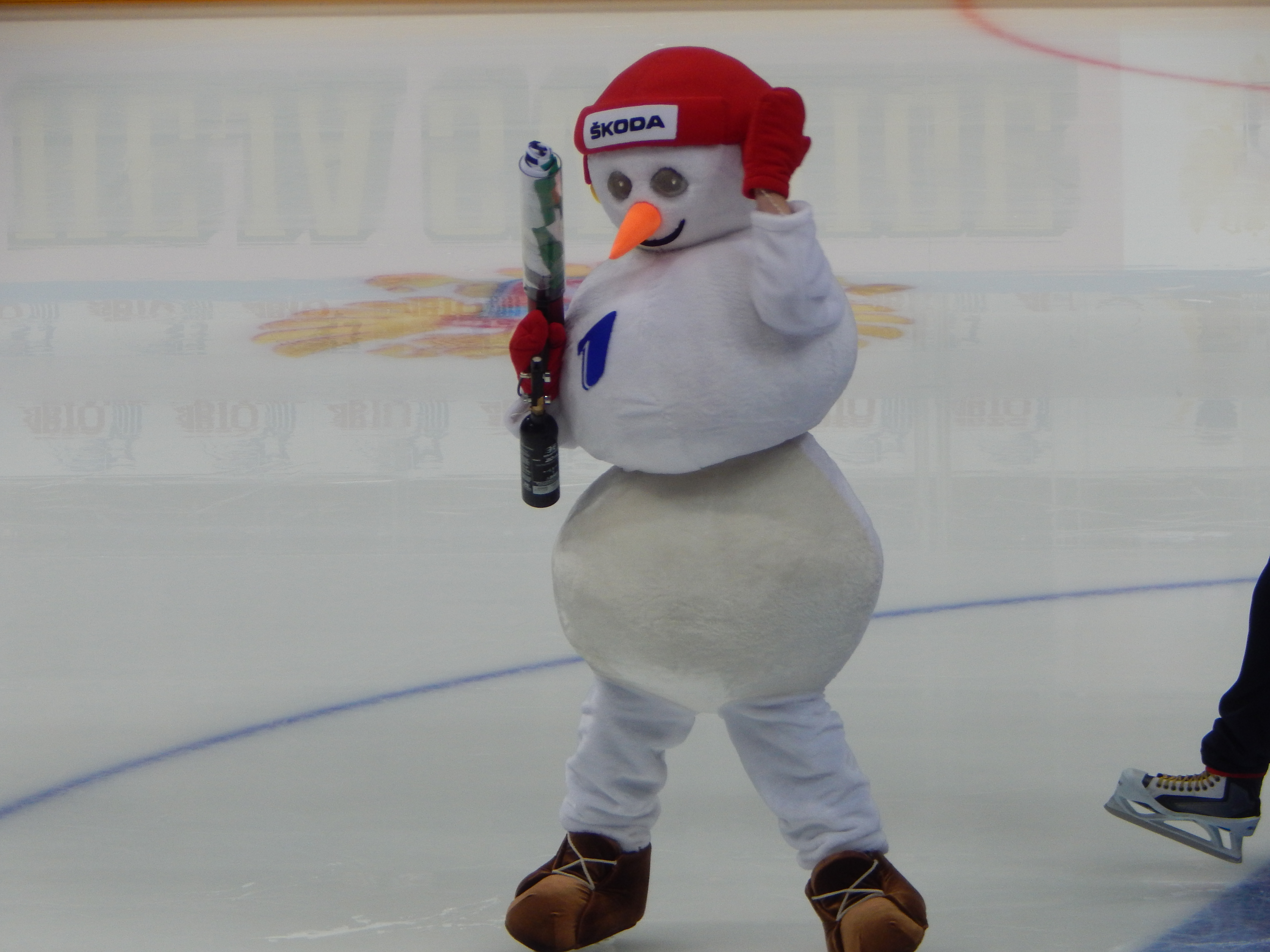
Snowman, another mascot
