= 2013 Oddset Hockey Games =

Tournament details
- Host countries: Sweden; Russia
- Cities: Stockholm; Saint Petersburg
- Venues: 2 (in 2 host cities)
- Dates: 6–10 February 2013
- Teams: 4

Final positions
- Champions: Finland (5th title)
- Runners-up: Czech Republic
- Third place: Russia
- Fourth place: Sweden

Tournament statistics
- Games played: 6
- Goals scored: 27 (4.5 per game)
- Attendance: 36,334 (6,056 per game)
- Scoring leader: (Russia) Sergei Mozyakin (4 points)

Awards
- MVP: (Finland) Juhamatti Aaltonen

Official website
- swehockey

The 2013 Oddset Hockey Games was played between 6 and 10 February 2013. The Czech Republic, Finland, Sweden and Russia played a round-robin for a total of three games per team and six games in total. Five of the matches were played in the Malmö Arena in Malmö, Sweden, and one match in the Ice Palace in Saint Petersburg, Russia. Finland won the tournament for the fourth time. The tournament was part of the 2012–13 Euro Hockey Tour.

== Standings ==
Pos	Team	Pld	W	OTW	OTL	L	GF	GA	GD	Pts
1	Finland	3	2	0	1	0	11	6	+5	7
2	Czech Republic	3	2	0	0	1	4	4	0	6
3	Russia	3	1	1	0	1	9	6	+3	5
4	Sweden	3	0	0	0	3	3	11	−8	0

Source: swehockey

== Games ==
All times are local. Stockholm – (Central European Time – UTC+1) Saint Petersburg – (Eastern European Time – UTC+2)

6 February 2013; 19:30	Russia	4–3 GWS (0–1, 0–0, 0–1) (OT: 0-0) (SO: 1-0)	Finland	Ice Palace, Saint Petersburg; Attendance: 12,500

Game reference

Vasily Koshechkin
Goalies
Atte Engren
Referees:
(Czech Republic) Martin Frano
(Czech Republic) Pavel Hodek
Linesmen:
(Russia) Yuri Ivanov
(Russia) Alexander Nesterov

	0–1	06:23 – J. Aaltonen (O. Osala, J-P Hytönen)
	0–2	15:37 – (PP1) J. Aaltonen (J. Niskala)
A. Belov (S. Mozyakin, Y. Rylov) (PP1) - 24:49	1-2
A. Perezhogin (S. Shirokov, A. Popov) - 45:13	2-2
V. Shipachev (A. Radulov, S. Mozyakin) - 49:57	3-2
	3-3	59:22 - (SH1) J. Aaltonen

A. Radulov (miss)
S. Mozyakin
V. Tikhonov
Shootout
S. Salminen
M. Anttila (miss)
J. Aaltonen (miss)
22 min
Penalties
12 min
31
Shots
30

7 February 2013; 19:00	Czech Republic	2–0 (0–0, 1–0, 1–0)	Sweden	Malmö Arena, Malmö; Attendance: 5,097

Game reference
Alexander Salak	Goalies	Joacim Eriksson	Referees: (Finland) Jari Levonen (Finland) Mikko Kaukokari; Linesmen: (Sweden) Henrik Pihlblad (Sweden) Tobias Haster
24:51 - M. Vondrka (P. Prucha) / 1–0; 40:24 - J. Novotny (Z. Irgl) / 2–0			Referees: (Finland) Jari Levonen (Finland) Mikko Kaukokari; Linesmen: (Sweden) Henrik Pihlblad (Sweden) Tobias Haster
10 min	Penalties	2 min	Referees: (Finland) Jari Levonen (Finland) Mikko Kaukokari; Linesmen: (Sweden) Henrik Pihlblad (Sweden) Tobias Haster
23	Shots	37	Referees: (Finland) Jari Levonen (Finland) Mikko Kaukokari; Linesmen: (Sweden) Henrik Pihlblad (Sweden) Tobias Haster

9 February 2013; 13:30	Finland	3–0 (1–0, 2–0, 0–0)	Czech Republic	Malmö Arena, Malmö; Attendance: 1,726

Game reference

Juha Metsola
Goalies
Alexander Salak
Referees:
(Sweden) Mikael Nord
(Sweden) Mikael Sjöqvist
Linesmen:
(Sweden) Jimmy Dahmén
(Sweden) Johannes Käck

V. Lajunen - 01:08	1–0
J. Hietanen (I. Filppula, J-P Haataja) - 30:05	2–0
V-M Savinainen (J-P Hytönen, V. Lajunen) - 32:13	3–0

8 min
Penalties
12 min
28
Shots
30

9 February 2013; 17:30	Sweden	1-4 (1-1,0-2,0-1)	Russia	Malmö Arena, Malmö; Attendance: 8,290

Game reference

Johan Gustafsson
Goalies
Vasily Koshechkin
Referees:
(Finland) Jari Levonen
(Finland) Mikko Kaukokari
Linesmen:
(Sweden) Fredrik Ulriksson
(Sweden) Tobias Haster

	0-1	14:20 - I. Nikulin (E. Biryukov, A. Radulov)
C. Söderberg (S. Hjalmarsson) (PP1) - 17:01	1-1
	1-2	21:05 - (PP1) S. Mozyakin (A. Radulov, V. Schipachev)
	1-3	25:58 - E. Kuznetsov (V. Tikhonov)
	1-4	46:13 - D. Kazionov (E. Biryukov, S. Plotnikov)

8 min
Penalties
16 min
37
Shots
22

10 February 2013; 13:00	Russia	1-2 (0-0,0-1,1-1)	Czech Republic	Malmö Arena, Malmö; Attendance: 1,364

Game reference

Konstantin Barulin
Goalies
Jakub Kovar
Referees:
(Sweden) Marcus Vinnerborg
(Sweden) Morgan Johansson
Linesmen:
(Sweden) Fredrik Ulriksson
(Sweden) Henrik Pihlblad

	0-1	29:56 - (PP1) Z. Irgl (P. Tenkrat)
	0-2	49:10 - V. Nedorost (L. Krajicek, M. Vondrka)
E. Kuznetsov (A. Popov) - 52:06	1-2

10 min
Penalties
6 min
33
Shots
30

10 February 2013; 17:00	Sweden	2-5 (0-0,1-3,1-2)	Finland	Malmö Arena, Malmö; Attendance: 7,357

Game reference

Gustaf Wesslau
Goalies
Atte Engren
Referees:
(Russia) Vyacheslav Bulanov
(Russia) Konstantin Olenin
Linesmen:
(Sweden) Jimmy Dahmén
(Sweden) Johannes Käck

	0-1	21:45 - J-P Hytönen (O. Osala)
	0-2	23:57 - (PP1) M. Mäenpää (S. Salminen)
J. Fransson (N. Burnström, J. Fasth) - 28:38	1-2
	1-3	32:31 - V-M Savinainen (K. Kuusela, L. Kukkonen)
	1-4	48:31 - (PP1) J. Hietanen (I. Filppula, J-P Haataja)
J. Andersson (N. Burnström, O. Lindberg) - 51:46	2-4
	2-5	59:25 - (ENG) T. Kiiskinen (M. Anttila, M. Lahti)

10 min
Penalties
8 min
42
Shots
21

== Scoring leaders ==
Pos	Player	Country	GP	G	A	Pts	+/−	PIM	POS
1	Sergei Mozyakin	Russia	3	1	3	4	3	0	FW
2	Juhamatti Aaltonen	Finland	3	3	0	3	3	0	FW
3	Ville Lajunen	Finland	3	1	2	3	3	4	DE
4	Juha-Pekka Hytönen	Finland	3	1	2	3	3	6	FW
5	Ilari Filppula	Finland	3	0	3	3	1	0	FW
6	Alexander Radulov	Russia	3	0	3	3	2	14	FW
7	Juuso Hietanen	Finland	3	2	0	2	0	0	DE
8	Veli-Matti Savinainen	Finland	3	2	0	2	1	2	FW
8	Evgeny Kuznetsov	Russia	3	2	0	2	0	2	FW
10	Michal Vondrka	Czech Republic	3	1	1	2	0	0	FW

GP = Games played; G = Goals; A = Assists; Pts = Points; +/− = Plus/minus; PIM = Penalties in minutes; POS = Position

== Goaltending leaders ==
Pos	Player	Country	TOI	GA	GAA	Sv%	SO
1	Alexander Salak	Czech Republic	120:00	3	1.50	95.38	1
2	Vasily Koshechkin	Russia	125:00	4	1.92	94.03	0
3	Atte Engren	Finland	123:06	5	2.44	93.06	0
4	Joacim Eriksson	Sweden	102:14	5	2.93	88.64	0

TOI = Time On Ice (minutes:seconds); SA = Shots against; GA = Goals against; GAA = Goals against average; Sv% = Save percentage; SO = Shutouts

== Tournament awards ==
The tournament directorate named the following players in the tournament 2013:

- Best goalkeeper: (Czech Republic) Alexander Salak
- Best defenceman: (Russia) Ilya Nikulin
- Best forward: (Finland) Juhamatti Aaltonen
- Most Valuable Player: (Finland) Juhamatti Aaltonen

Media All-Star Team:

- Goaltender: (Czech Republic) Alexander Salak
- Defence: (Russia) Ilya Nikulin, (Finland) Ville Lajunen
- Forwards: (Finland) Juhamatti Aaltonen, (Russia) Sergei Mozyakin, (Russia) Evgeny Kuznetsov
