= Filppula =

Filppula is a Finnish surname. Notable people with the surname include:

- Ilari Filppula (born 1981), Finnish ice hockey player
- Valtteri Filppula (born 1984), Finnish ice hockey player, brother of Ilari
