= 2016–17 Euro Hockey Tour =

Tournament details
- Dates: 3 November 2016 – 30 April 2017
- Teams: 4

Final positions
- Champions: Russia (7th title)
- Runners-up: Czech Republic
- Third place: Finland
- Fourth place: Sweden

Tournament statistics
- Games played: 24
- Goals scored: 142 (5.92 per game)
- Attendance: 164,045 (6,835 per game)
- Scoring leader: (Czech Republic) Lukáš Radil (12 points)

The 2016–17 Euro Hockey Tour was the 21st season of Euro Hockey Tour. It started on 3 November 2016 and lasted until 30 April 2017. It consisted of Karjala Tournament, Channel One Cup, Sweden Hockey Games and Czech Hockey Games. Russia won the tournament.

== Standings ==
Pos	Team	Pld	W	OTW	OTL	L	GF	GA	GD	Pts
1	Russia	12	8	1	1	2	38	23	+15	27
2	Czech Republic	12	6	0	1	5	43	39	+4	19
3	Finland	12	5	0	0	7	28	37	−9	15
4	Sweden	12	3	1	0	8	33	43	−10	11

Source: eurohockey

== Karjala Tournament ==
The 2016 Karjala Tournament was played from 3 to 6 November 2016. Five of the matches were played in Helsinki, Finland, and one match in Plzeň, Czech Republic. Tournament was won by Russia.

Pos	Team	Pld	W	OTW	OTL	L	GF	GA	GD	Pts
1	Russia	3	3	0	0	0	11	3	+8	9
2	Czech Republic	3	2	0	0	1	11	9	+2	6
3	Finland	3	1	0	0	2	8	11	−3	3
4	Sweden	3	0	0	0	3	6	13	−7	0

Source: Swehockey

3 November 2016
Czech Republic	6–3	Sweden
Russia	5–1	Finland
5 November 2015
Sweden	2–3	Russia
Finland	3–5	Czech Republic
6 November 2015
Czech Republic	0–3	Russia
Finland	4–1	Sweden

== Channel One Cup ==
The 2016 Channel One Cup was played from 15 to 18 December 2016. Five of the matches were played in Moscow, Russia, and one match in Helsinki, Finland. Tournament was won by Sweden.

Pos	Team	Pld	W	OTW	OTL	L	GF	GA	GD	Pts
1	Sweden	3	2	0	0	1	8	7	+1	6
2	Russia	3	2	0	0	1	10	7	+3	6
3	Finland	3	1	0	0	2	9	10	−1	3
4	Czech Republic	3	1	0	0	2	7	10	−3	3

Source: EHT

15 December 2016
Russia	1–3	Sweden
Czech Republic	2–4	Finland
16 December 2016
Russia	5–1	Czech Republic
17 December 2016
Finland	2–4	Sweden
18 December 2016
Sweden	1–4	Czech Republic
Russia	4–3	Finland

== Sweden Hockey Games ==
The 2017 Sweden Hockey Games were played from 9 to 12 February 2017. Five of the matches were played in Gothenburg, Sweden, and one match in Saint Petersburg, Russia. Tournament was won by Russia.

Pos	Team	Pld	W	OTW	OTL	L	GF	GA	GD	Pts
1	Russia	3	3	0	0	0	10	5	+5	9
2	Sweden	3	1	0	0	2	9	9	0	3
3	Czech Republic	3	1	0	0	2	11	10	+1	3
4	Finland	3	1	0	0	2	5	11	−6	3

Source: swehockey

9 February 2017
Czech Republic	2–5	Sweden
Russia	2–1	Finland
11 February 2017
Finland	1–7	Czech Republic
Sweden	2–4	Russia
12 February 2017
Russia	4–2	Czech Republic
Sweden	2–3	Finland

== Czech Hockey Games ==
The 2017 Czech Hockey Games were played from 27 to 30 April 2017. Five of the matches were played in České Budějovice, Czech Republic, and one match in Stockholm, Sweden. Tournament was won by the Czech Republic.

Pos	Team	Pld	W	OTW	OTL	L	GF	GA	GD	Pts
1	Czech Republic	3	2	0	1	0	14	10	+4	7
2	Finland	3	2	0	0	1	6	5	+1	6
3	Russia	3	0	1	1	1	7	8	−1	3
4	Sweden	3	0	1	0	2	10	14	−4	2

Source: Eurohockey.com

27 April 2017
Finland	2–3	Czech Republic
Sweden	4–3 (OT)	Russia
29 April 2017
Russia	0–1	Finland
Czech Republic	8–4	Sweden
30 April 2017
Sweden	2–3	Finland
Czech Republic	3–4 (GWS)	Russia
