= CSKA Arena =

Indoor sporting arena located in Russia

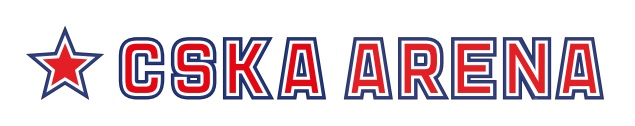

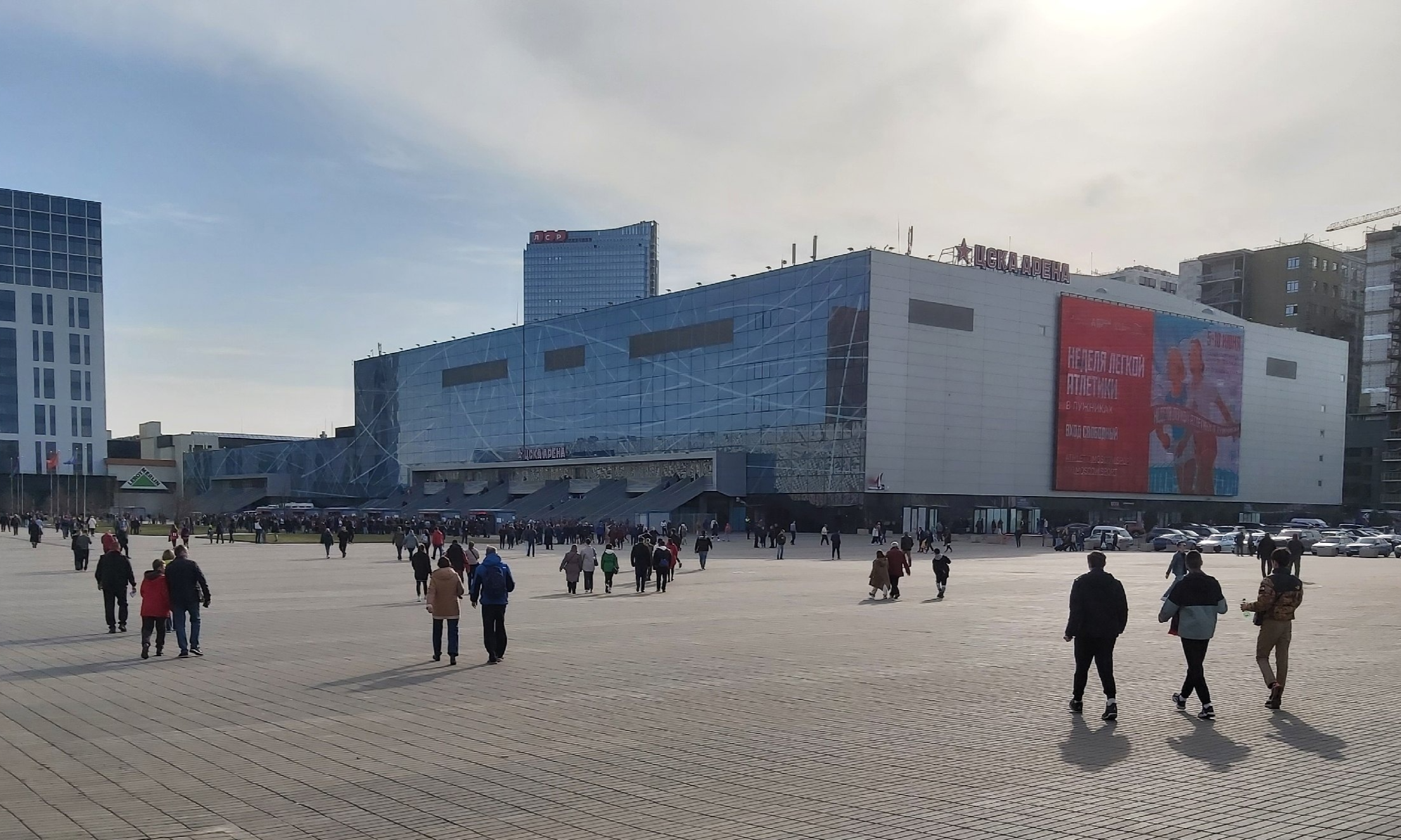
- Interactive map of CSKA Arena
- Former names: VTB Ice Palace; Legends Arena (during construction)
- Location: 23a Avtozavodskaya Street, Moscow, Russia
- Coordinates: 55.7014°N 37.6449°E
- Owner: PJSC Rosneft Oil Company
- Capacity: Large Arena; Ice hockey: 12,100; Basketball: 13,000; Boxing/MMA: 14,000; Concerts: 14,000; Small Arena; Ice hockey: 3,500; Basketball: 4,400; Boxing: 5,000; Concerts: 5,000
- Executive suites: 80
- Acreage: 70,3 thousand sq.m
- Public transit: Avtozavodskaya; ZIL

Construction
- Built: 2013–2015
- Opened: April 26, 2015; 11 years ago
- Cost: 4,5 billion RUB (60 million Euro)
- Architects: Sergey Choban, Nikolai Gordyushin, Sergey Popov, Alexey Evsikov, Alexey Bolotin (SPEECH)

Tenants
- HC CSKA Moscow (KHL, 2018; 8 years ago) HC Zvezda Moscow (VHL, 2018; 8 years ago) HC Krasnaya Armiya Moscow (MHL, 2018; 8 years ago)

Website
- icearenamsk.ru

CSKA Arena (Russian: ЦСКА Арена), formerly known as VTB Ice Palace (Russian: ВТБ Ледовый дворец) and Legends Park Arena (Russian: Арена в Парке Легенд), is an indoor multi-sport venue that is located in Moscow, Russia. Its main sponsor is VTB Bank.

CSKA Arena is a part of the Park of Legends renovation project on the former ZiL auto plant site. It includes the Arena, the Russian Hockey Museum with the Russian Hockey Hall of Glory, Watersport Arena, and Apartments Complex. It is located nearby the ZIL MCC and Avtozavodskaya Metro station.

== History ==
The Ice Palace opened on April 26, 2015. It has been the home arena for KHL's club CSKA Moscow since 2018.

From 2015 it was the home stadium for the Kontinental Hockey League ice hockey team Dynamo Moscow before they moved into their newly built own VTB Arena in January 2019. From 2017 to 2021, it was the home arena for Spartak Moscow before they announced plans to move into another Moscow Sports Palace Megasport.

In 2015, five of six matches of Channel One Cup were played in the Arena. In 2016, the arena hosted games of the 2016 IIHF World Championship.

== Venues ==
The facility features three different indoor arenas, the "Large Arena," the "Small Arena," and a training facility.

The large arena has a seating capacity of 12,100 viewers for ice hockey and figure skating, 13,000 for basketball and 14,000 for wrestling, boxing, MMA, and concerts.

The small arena has a seating capacity of 3,500 viewers for ice hockey and figure skating, 4,400 for basketball and 5,000 for wrestling, boxing, MMA, and concerts. The third arena, the training arena, has a capacity of 500.

== Gallery ==
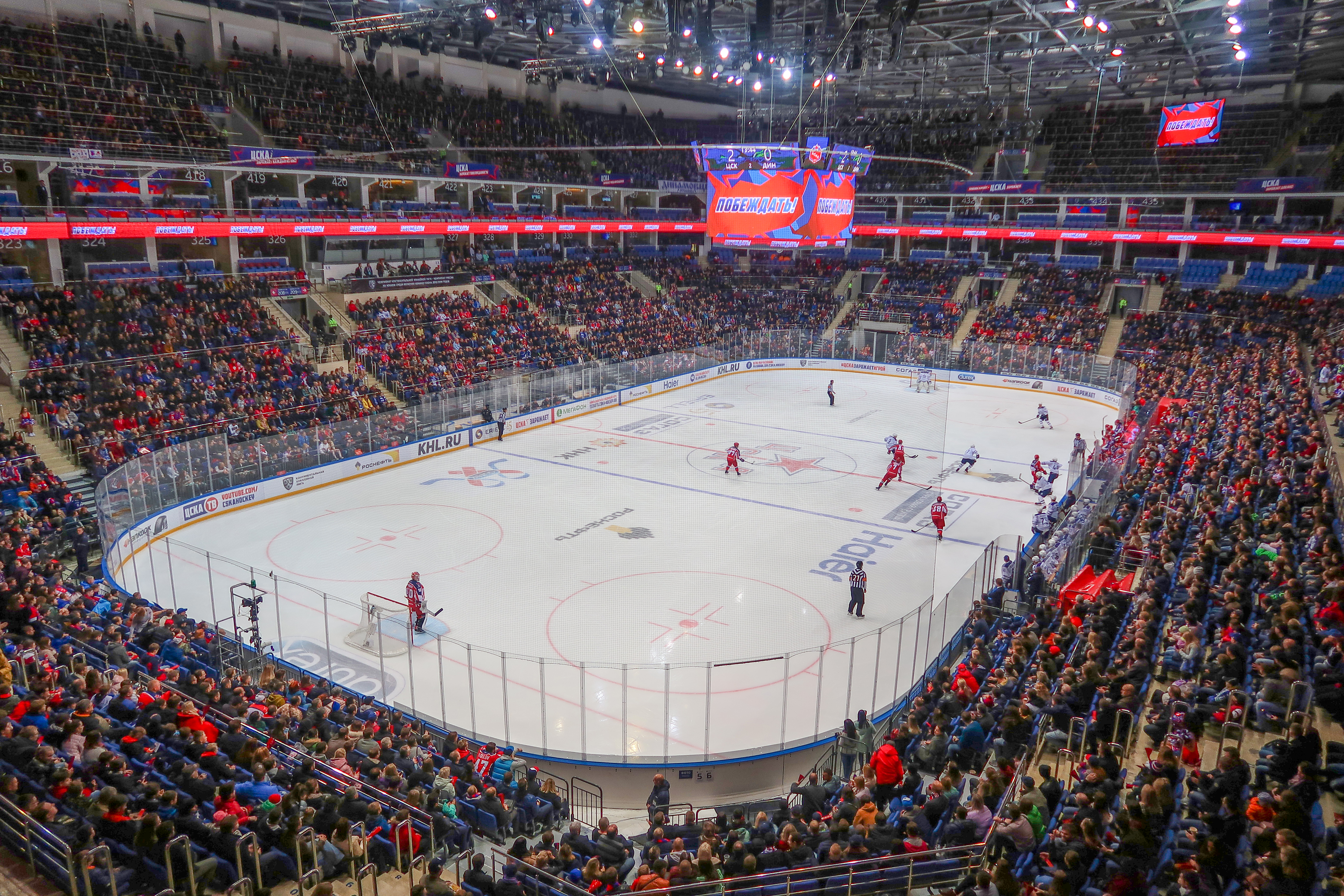
Interior (2018)

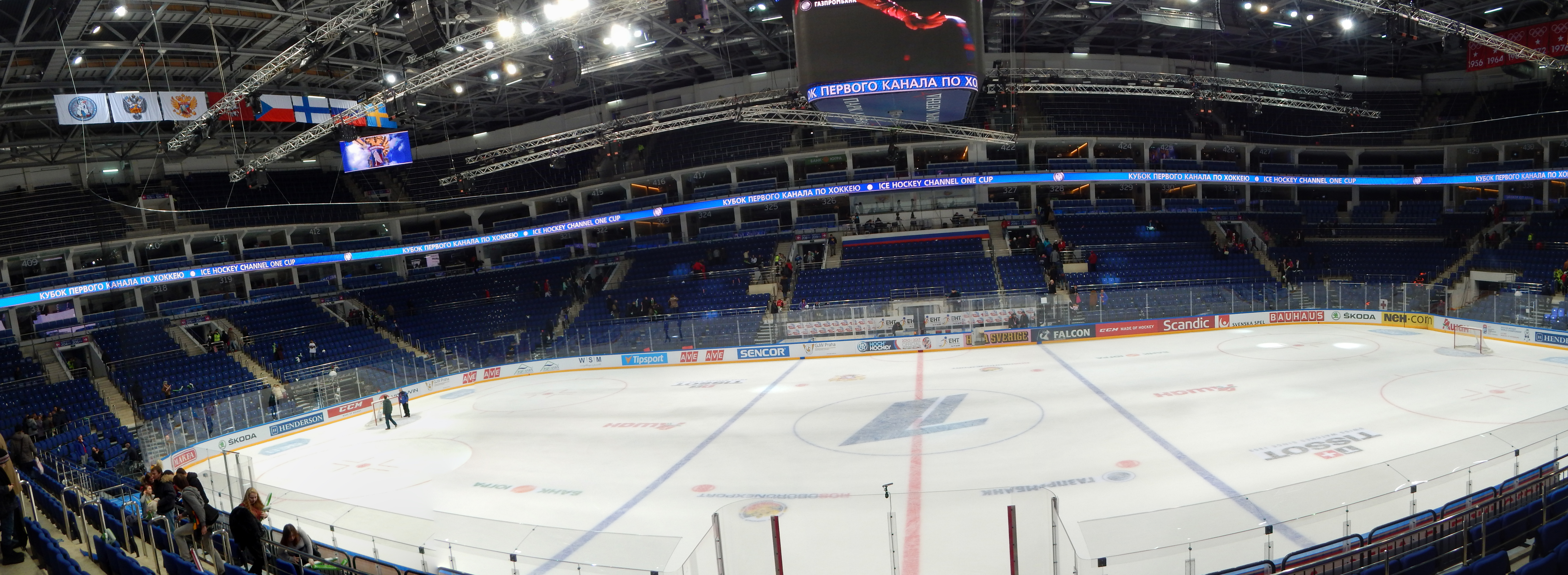
Channel One Cup (Sector 202)

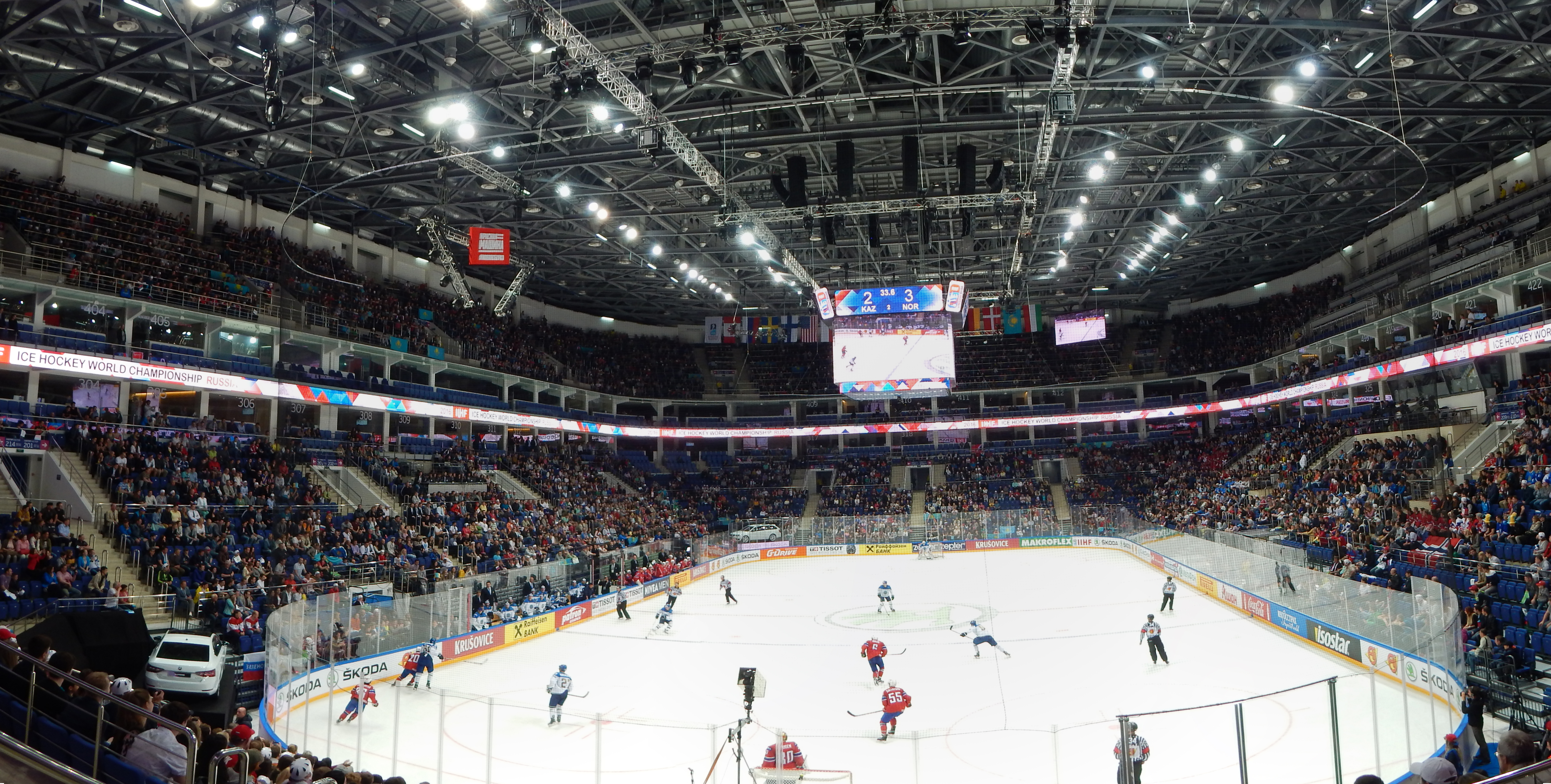
2016 IIHF World Championship (Sector 212)

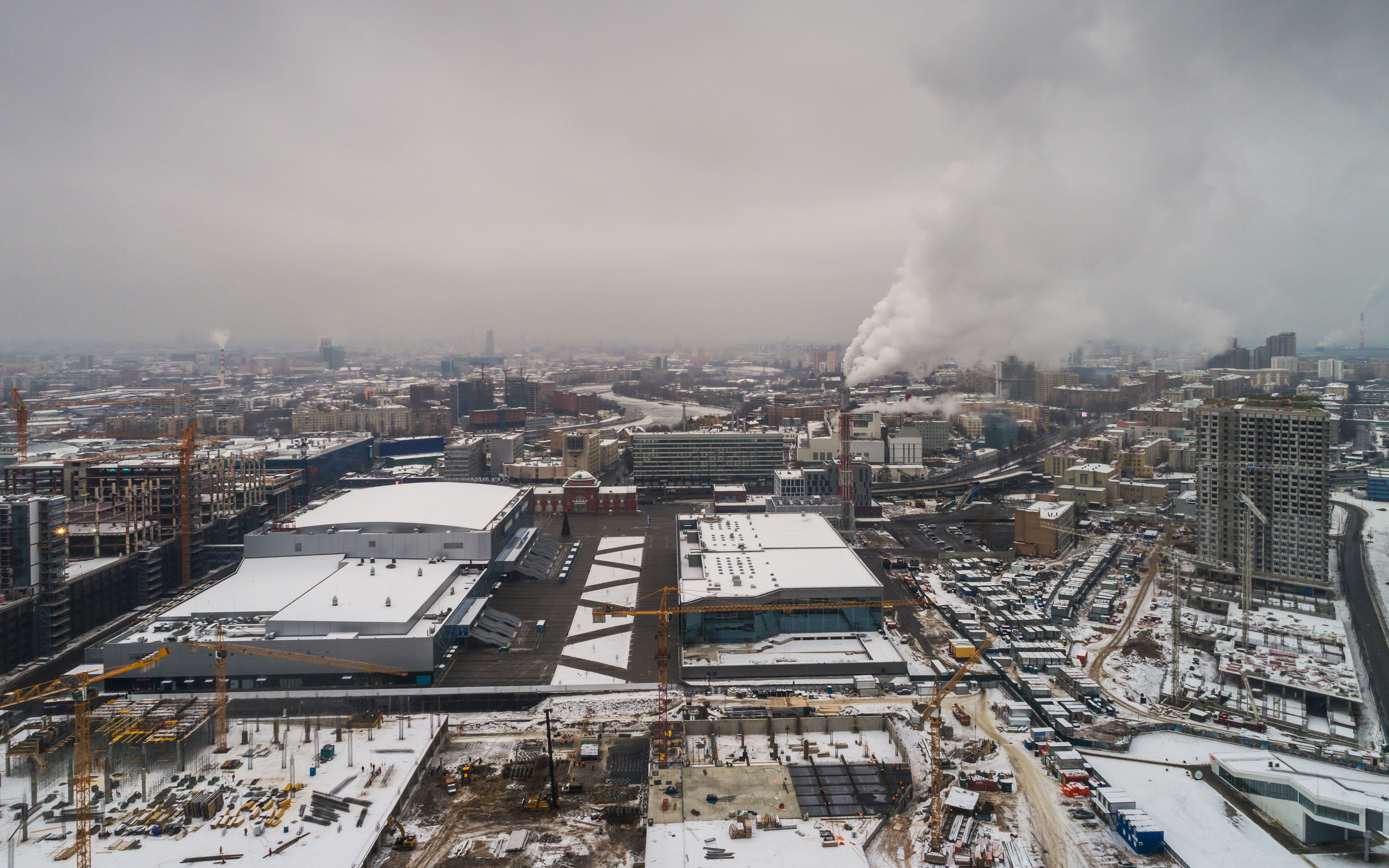
Aerial photo of former ZiL plant, Moscow (2018)

== See also ==
- List of indoor arenas in Russia
- List of European ice hockey arenas
