= Jakub Jeřábek =

Czech ice hockey player (born 1991)

- Jakub Jeřábek in 2026
- Born: 12 May 1991 (age 35) Plzeň, Czechoslovakia
- Height: 5 ft 11 in (180 cm)
- Weight: 194 lb (88 kg; 13 st 12 lb)
- Position: Defence
- Shoots: Left
- ELH team Former teams: HC Plzeň; HC Vityaz; Montreal Canadiens; Washington Capitals; St. Louis Blues; Spartak Moscow; HC Oceláři Třinec
- National team: Czech Republic
- NHL draft: Undrafted
- Playing career: 2008–present

Jakub Jeřábek (born 12 May 1991) is a Czech professional ice hockey player who is a defenceman for HC Plzeň in the Czech Extraliga (ELH). Originally undrafted by teams in the National Hockey League (NHL), Jeřábek has previously played for the Montreal Canadiens, Washington Capitals, and St. Louis Blues.

== Playing career ==
Jeřábek played as a youth with his hometown club, HC Plzeň. Undrafted, he remained in the Czech Republic and made his senior debut with Plzeň in the Czech Extraliga during the 2008–09 season.

Over the following three seasons, Jeřábek continued his development before cementing a full-time role on the blueline of Plzeň in the 2012–13 season. In establishing himself as the club's top defenceman, Jeřábek was recognised in the 2015–16 season, as the league's best defenceman in compiling 33 points in 52 games with Plzeň.

To play at a higher level, Jeřábek left Plzeň after eight senior seasons in signing a one-year contract with Russian outfit, Vityaz of the Kontinental Hockey League (KHL) on 5 May 2016. In the ensuing 2016–17 season, Jeřábek instantly assumed the role as Vityaz's top pairing defenceman. He led the blueline with 5 goals and 29 assists for 34 points in 59 games, placing him 6th in overall scoring. He was also selected to represent Vityaz at the 2017 KHL All-Star Game.

In attracting National Hockey League (NHL) interest and at the conclusion of his contract with Vityaz, Jeřábek signed a one-year, entry-level contract with the Montreal Canadiens on 1 May 2017. In the 2017–18 season, Jeřábek was initially assigned to American Hockey League (AHL) affiliate, Laval Rocket. On 22 November 2017, he received his first recall to the NHL. He appeared in 25 games with the Canadiens before on 21 February 2018, Jeřábek was traded to the Washington Capitals in exchange for a fifth-round pick in the 2019 NHL entry draft. Jeřábek played in 11 games during his first season with the Capitals, and scored his only goal with the Caps in a March game against the Canadiens. Jeřábek also started the first two playoff games of the first round against the Columbus Blue Jackets during the Capitals' 2018 Stanley Cup run, but was subsequently scratched for fellow rookie Christian Djoos.

As a free agent from the Stanley Cup-winning Capitals, Jeřábek was signed to a one-year contract with the Edmonton Oilers on 20 August 2018. Before starting the 2018–19 season, Jeřábek was traded to the St. Louis Blues for a conditional 6th-round draft pick in the 2020 NHL entry draft. He played in a single game with the Blues before he was placed on waivers and reassigned to their AHL affiliate, the San Antonio Rampage, for the remainder of the season.

On 3 May 2019, as an impending free agent from the Blues, Jeřábek opted to leave the NHL and return on a one-year contract to Russian club, HC Vityaz of the KHL. Following two seasons with Vityaz Podolsk, Jeřábek left as a free agent and was signed to a one-year contract to continue in the KHL with HC Spartak Moscow on 29 July 2021.

On 6 June 2022, as a free agent, Jeřábek opted to return to his native Czech Republic, returning to the ELH after six years in agreeing to a one-year contract with HC Oceláři Třinec.

== International play ==
Jeřábek captained the junior Czech Republic team at the 2011 World Junior Championships and was the third-highest-scoring defenceman of the tournament, after Ryan Ellis and Dmitri Orlov.

== Personal life ==
His father is former Czech soccer player Jaroslav Jeřábek. His sister is Czech international handball player Markéta Jeřábková.

== Career statistics ==
=== Regular season and playoffs ===
			Regular season					Playoffs
Season	Team	League	GP	G	A	Pts	PIM	GP	G	A	Pts	PIM
2006–07	HC Lasselsberger Plzeň	CZE U18	44	8	21	29	97	7	1	0	1	6
2007–08	HC Lasselsberger Plzeň	CZE U18	17	3	17	20	76	8	5	4	9	4
2007–08	HC Lasselsberger Plzeň	CZE U20	29	3	11	14	26	—	—	—	—	—
2008–09	HC Lasselsberger Plzeň	CZE U20	40	8	20	28	32	5	0	3	3	8
2008–09	HC Lasselsberger Plzeň	ELH	2	0	0	0	2	—	—	—	—	—
2008–09	HC Berounští Medvědi	Czech.1	4	0	1	1	6	—	—	—	—	—
2009–10	HC Plzeň 1929	CZE U20	12	4	12	16	6	4	1	2	3	8
2009–10	HC Plzeň 1929	ELH	37	0	2	2	22	2	0	0	0	2
2010–11	HC Plzeň 1929	CZE U20	3	0	2	2	0	—	—	—	—	—
2010–11	HC Plzeň 1929	ELH	41	1	6	7	20	4	0	1	1	2
2010–11	HC Slovan Ústečtí Lvi	Czech.1	2	0	0	0	2	—	—	—	—	—
2011–12	HC Plzeň 1929	ELH	32	1	3	4	22	10	0	2	2	6
2011–12	Piráti Chomutov	Czech.1	4	0	0	0	2	—	—	—	—	—
2011–12	SK Kadaň	Czech.1	11	1	4	5	8	—	—	—	—	—
2012–13	HC Škoda Plzeň	ELH	49	2	6	8	44	17	1	3	4	12
2013–14	HC Škoda Plzeň	ELH	47	1	12	13	24	6	0	1	1	12
2014–15	HC Škoda Plzeň	ELH	48	7	25	32	40	4	0	3	3	8
2015–16	HC Škoda Plzeň	ELH	52	4	29	33	56	11	0	5	5	20
2016–17	HC Vityaz	KHL	59	5	29	34	56	4	1	1	2	8
2017–18	Laval Rocket	AHL	17	1	10	11	16	—	—	—	—	—
2017–18	Montreal Canadiens	NHL	25	1	3	4	6	—	—	—	—	—
2017–18	Washington Capitals	NHL	11	1	3	4	0	2	0	1	1	2
2018–19	St. Louis Blues	NHL	1	0	0	0	2	—	—	—	—	—
2018–19	San Antonio Rampage	AHL	52	6	9	15	28	—	—	—	—	—
2019–20	HC Vityaz	KHL	53	10	16	26	38	4	0	1	1	2
2020–21	HC Vityaz	KHL	46	6	12	18	24	—	—	—	—	—
2021–22	Spartak Moscow	KHL	39	3	4	7	10	5	0	0	0	8
2022–23	HC Oceláři Třinec	ELH	52	4	23	27	22	21	3	8	11	6
2023–24	HC Oceláři Třinec	ELH	51	5	30	35	14	—	—	—	—	—
2024–25	HC Oceláři Třinec	ELH	23	1	7	8	4	1	0	0	0	0
2025–26	HC Plzeň	ELH	44	2	6	8	41	7	0	1	1	7
ELH totals			478	28	149	177	311	83	4	24	28	75
KHL totals			197	24	61	85	128	13	1	2	3	18
NHL totals			37	2	6	8	8	2	0	1	1	2

=== International ===
Year	Team	Event	Result	GP	G	A	Pts	PIM
2009	Czech Republic	WJC18	6th	6	1	1	2	22
2010	Czech Republic	WJC	7th	6	1	1	2	0
2011	Czech Republic	WJC	7th	6	1	7	8	4
2016	Czech Republic	WC	5th	8	0	5	5	2
2017	Czech Republic	WC	7th	8	0	2	2	4
2022	Czech Republic	OG	9th	4	0	0	0	4
Junior totals				18	3	9	12	26
Senior totals				20	0	7	7	10

== Awards and honours ==
Award	Year	Ref
ELH
Czech Extraliga Champion	2013; 2023; 2024	
Best Defenceman	2016	
KHL
All-Star Game	2017	
NHL
Stanley Cup champion	2018	
