= Mattias Sjögren =

Swedish ice hockey player

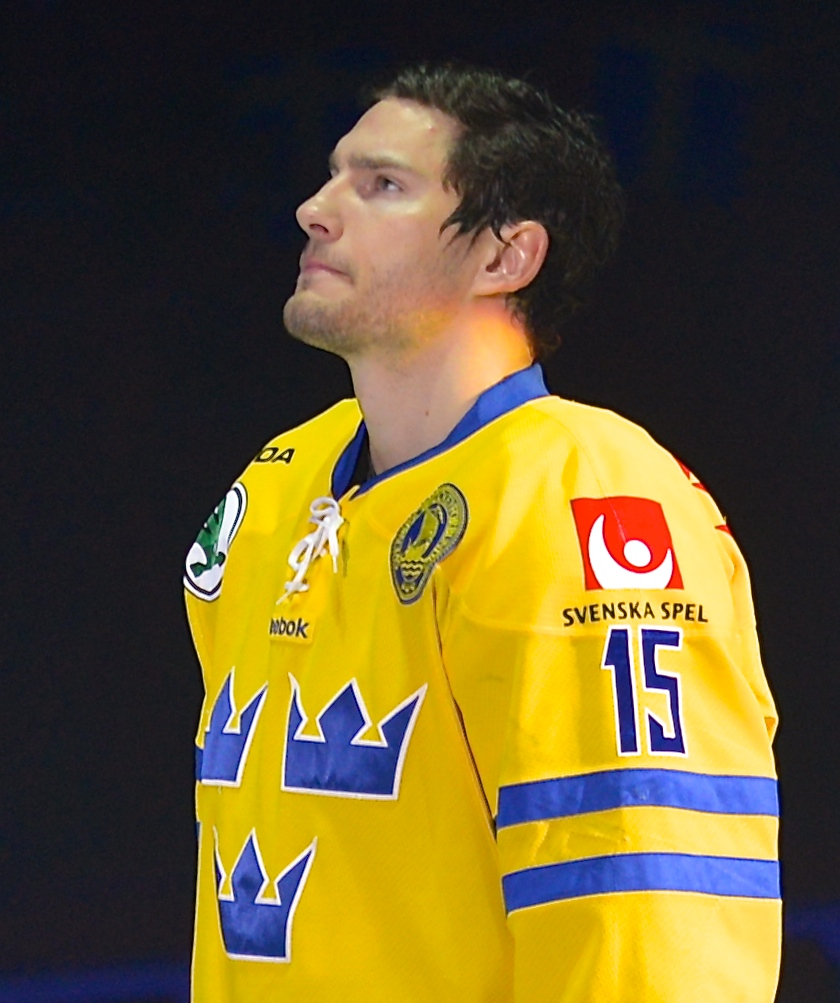
- Born: 27 November 1987 (age 38) Landskrona, Sweden
- Height: 6 ft 2 in (188 cm)
- Weight: 214 lb (97 kg; 15 st 4 lb)
- Position: Centre
- Shot: Left
- Played for: Rögle BK; Färjestad BK; Hershey Bears; Linköpings HC; Ak Bars Kazan; ZSC Lions
- National team: Sweden
- NHL draft: Undrafted
- Playing career: 2005–2022

Mattias Sjögren (born November 27, 1987) is a Swedish former professional ice hockey centre who last played for Rögle BK of the Swedish Hockey League (SHL).

== Playing career ==
Undrafted, Sjögren played youth hockey in Sweden within Rögle BK. He made his professional debut in the HockeyAllsvenskan with Rögle BK, helping gain promotion to the Elitserien. He transferred to fellow top division club, Färjestad BK, for the 2010–11 season and won the Swedish championship with the club that year.

On June 1, 2011, Sjögren as a free agent to a two-year contract, reportedly worth 1.8 million dollars, with the Washington Capitals. In the 2011–12 season, after attending the Capitals training camp, he was assigned to AHL affiliate, the Hershey Bears. In November 2011, Sjögren elected to return to Sweden, allowable by his contract, after becoming displeased with the Capitals for not calling him up from the Hershey Bears for an extended period of time. General Manager George McPhee said, "When we signed him, we told him we had a job available and promised him we’d give him a look this year. His training camp wasn't good enough to keep him at the start of the year, and he was developing OK, but I guess he got impatient and decided to go home. And if you’re going to quit on us you might as well go." On April 10, 2012, Sjögren however, was recalled from Sweden by the Capitals for the 2012 Stanley Cup Playoffs to be added to the practice squad.

After two largely unsuccessful seasons in North America within the Capitals organization and without seeing NHL action, Sjögren returned to the Swedish Hockey League (SHL), signing a three-year contract with Linköpings HC on May 16, 2013. He played two years with the Linköping team and received the Peter Forsberg Trophy as the SHL's best forward in the 2014-15 season before signing with Ak Bars Kazan of the KHL for the 2015-16 season.

On June 16, 2016, he signed a two-year contract with the ZSC Lions of the National League (NL). In his two seasons with the Lions, Sjögren was unable to make the desired impact, largely affected through injury, limiting him to just 19 games in the 2017–18 season.

On April 28, 2018, Sjögren as a free agent opted to return home to original club, Rögle BK of the SHL, agreeing to a four-year contract.

== International play ==
Medal record

Representing Sweden

Ice hockey

World Championships
Silver medal – second place	2011 Slovakia	
Bronze medal – third place	2014 Belarus	

Sjögren was a member of Sweden's silver-winning squad at the 2011 IIHF World Championship and won bronze at the 2014 IIHF World Championships.

== Career statistics ==
=== Regular season and playoffs ===
			Regular season					Playoffs
Season	Team	League	GP	G	A	Pts	PIM	GP	G	A	Pts	PIM
2004–05	Rögle BK	Allsv	1	0	0	0	0	—	—	—	—	—
2005–06	Rögle BK	Allsv	40	1	3	4	8	10	0	2	2	2
2006–07	Rögle BK	Allsv	45	0	2	2	30	10	0	1	1	8
2007–08	Rögle BK	Allsv	45	4	10	14	38	10	4	2	6	8
2008–09	Rögle BK	SEL	43	6	7	13	16	—	—	—	—	—
2009–10	Rögle BK	SEL	54	11	11	22	20	—	—	—	—	—
2010–11	Färjestad BK	SEL	51	7	17	24	44	13	1	8	9	4
2011–12	Hershey Bears	AHL	19	2	3	5	4	—	—	—	—	—
2011–12	Färjestad BK	SEL	28	3	6	9	22	11	2	2	4	2
2012–13	Hershey Bears	AHL	32	3	5	8	12	—	—	—	—	—
2013–14	Linköpings HC	SHL	54	6	29	35	44	12	3	8	11	8
2014–15	Linköpings HC	SHL	43	9	17	26	30	11	1	6	7	12
2015–16	Ak Bars Kazan	KHL	54	6	12	18	32	7	0	1	1	4
2016–17	ZSC Lions	NLA	42	5	16	21	26	2	0	0	0	0
2017–18	ZSC Lions	NL	19	3	5	8	16	—	—	—	—	—
2018–19	Rögle BK	SHL	33	4	11	15	10	—	—	—	—	—
2019–20	Rögle BK	SHL	38	3	12	15	18	—	—	—	—	—
2020–21	Rögle BK	SHL	51	1	14	15	22	14	1	6	7	4
2021–22	Rögle BK	SHL	44	1	4	5	18	13	0	3	3	4
SHL totals			439	51	128	179	244	74	8	33	41	34

=== International ===
Year	Team	Event	Result	GP	G	A	Pts	PIM
2011	Sweden	WC	2nd place, silver medalist(s)	9	1	3	4	2
2014	Sweden	WC	3rd place, bronze medalist(s)	10	0	0	0	6
2015	Sweden	WC	5th	8	1	4	5	4
2016	Sweden	WC	6th	8	0	3	3	2
Senior totals				35	2	10	12	14
