= Harri Säteri =

Finnish ice hockey player (born 1989)

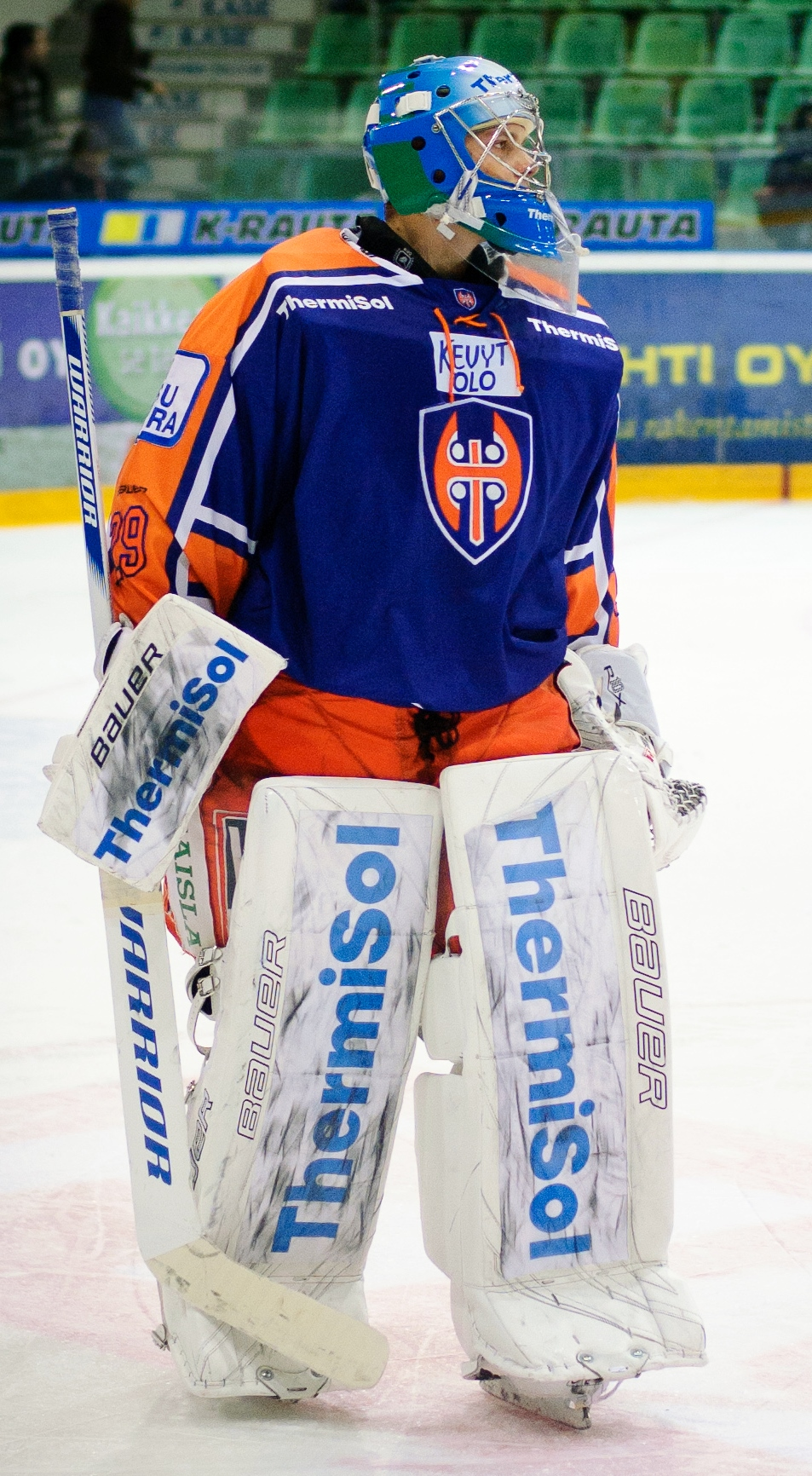
- Born: 29 December 1989 (age 36) Toijala, Finland
- Height: 6 ft 1 in (185 cm)
- Weight: 205 lb (93 kg; 14 st 9 lb)
- Position: Goaltender
- Catches: Left
- NL team Former teams: EHC Biel; Tappara; Vityaz Podolsk; Florida Panthers; Sibir Novosibirsk; Arizona Coyotes
- National team: Finland
- NHL draft: 106th overall, 2008; San Jose Sharks
- Playing career: 2007–present

Harri Säteri (born 29 December 1989) is a Finnish professional ice hockey player who is a goaltender for EHC Biel of the National League (NL). Although drafted in 2008 by the San Jose Sharks, he did not play in an NHL game until nearly a decade later as a member of the Florida Panthers.

== Playing career ==
Säteri's first full season at the senior level was 2008–09, when he played in 22 matches for Tappara in the SM-liiga. He was selected 106th overall in the 2008 NHL entry draft by the San Jose Sharks. He was later a first-round selection in the 2009 KHL Junior Draft by SKA Saint Petersburg.

On 1 June 2010, Säteri signed a three-year entry-level contract with San Jose.

Due to injuries to two San Jose Sharks goaltenders, who also happened to be Finnish (Antti Niemi and Antero Niittymäki), Säteri was on the bench serving as backup to Thomas Greiss on 8 October 2011, though he never went into the game.

After four seasons in the Sharks organization with American Hockey League affiliate, the Worcester Sharks, Säteri opted to leave North America. He signed a one-year contract with the Russian club Vityaz Podolsk of the Kontinental Hockey League (KHL), who earlier acquired his rights from SKA St. Petersburg, on 20 May 2014.

After three seasons with Vityaz in the KHL, Säteri opted to return to North America for another attempt with the NHL, signing a one-year, two-way contract with the Florida Panthers on 1 July 2017. On 2 January 2018, Säteri made his NHL debut in a 5–1 loss to the Minnesota Wild, where he allowed one goal on 14 shots.

On 1 July 2018, having opted to leave the Panthers as a free agent, Säteri agreed to sign a one-year, two-way contract with the Detroit Red Wings. Assigned to AHL affiliate, the Grand Rapids Griffins, Säteri was the starting goaltender for the duration of the 2018–19 season. Making 40 appearances, Säteri notched a career AHL-best 22 wins.

On 27 May 2019, unable to crack the Red Wings roster and as an impending free agent, Säteri signed a one-year contract to return to the KHL with Russian club, Sibir Novosibirsk.

In the midst of his third season in Sibir Novosibirsk, having completed the 2021–22 regular season, in March 2022, Säteri left the club during the KHL playoffs due to the Russian invasion of Ukraine.

In March 2022, Säteri was signed as a free agent to a one-year, $750,000 contract to join the Toronto Maple Leafs, but was claimed off of waivers by the Arizona Coyotes.

As a free agent from his brief tenure with the Coyotes, Säteri returned to Europe and signed a one-year contract with Swiss club EHC Biel of the NL on 18 July 2022.

== International play ==
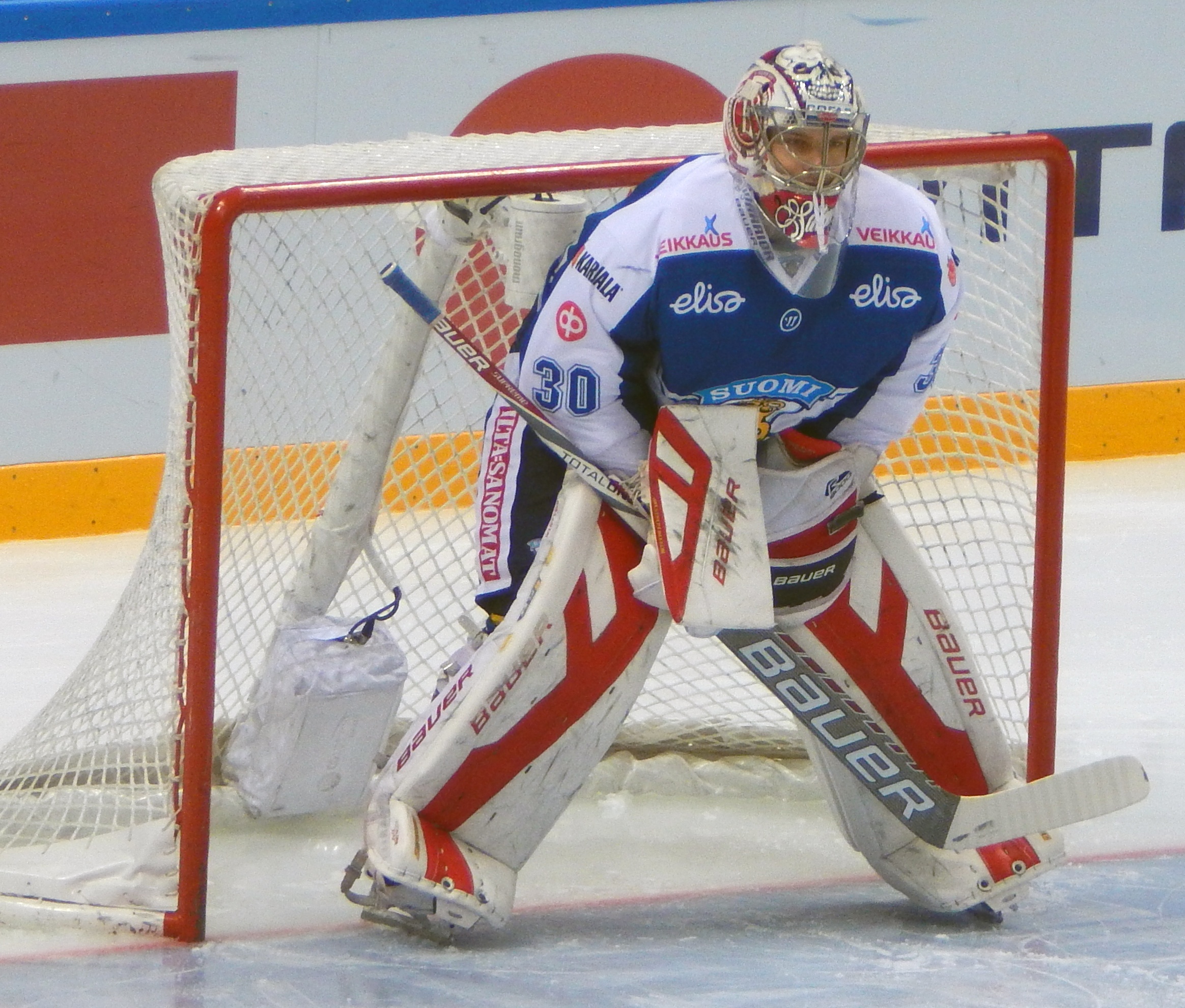
- Harri Säteri playing for the Finnish national team

Medal record

Representing Finland

Ice hockey

Olympic Games
| Gold medal – first place | 2022 Beijing | |

World Championships
| Gold medal – first place | 2022 Finland | |
| Gold medal – first place | 2026 Switzerland | |
| Silver medal – second place | 2021 Latvia | |

Säteri was selected to be the starting goaltender for Finland at the 2022 Winter Olympics, where he backstopped the Finns to win their first-ever Olympic gold medal.

== Career statistics ==
=== Regular season and playoffs ===
| | | | Regular season | | | | | | | | | Playoffs |
| Season | Team | League | GP | W | L | OT | MIN | GA | SO | GAA | SV% | GP | W | L | MIN | GA | SO | GAA | SV% |
|---|---|---|---|---|---|---|---|---|---|---|---|---|---|---|---|---|---|---|---|
| 2005–06 | HPK | Jr. A | 1 | 0 | 1 | 0 | 54 | 3 | 0 | 3.66 | .857 | — | — | — | — | — | — | — | — |
| 2006–07 | Tappara | Jr. A | 23 | — | — | — | — | 59 | 0 | 2.63 | .924 | 10 | — | — | — | 31 | 0 | 3.03 | .913 |
| 2007–08 | Tappara | Jr. A | 34 | 13 | 17 | 3 | — | 102 | 1 | 2.99 | .908 | 3 | 0 | 3 | — | 8 | 0 | 2.70 | .906 |
| 2008–09 | Tappara | SM-l | 22 | 6 | 12 | 3 | 1,253 | 48 | 2 | 2.30 | .921 | — | — | — | — | — | — | — | — |
| 2009–10 | Tappara | SM-l | 49 | 21 | 22 | 4 | 2,836 | 129 | 2 | 2.73 | .915 | 9 | 4 | 5 | 572 | 27 | 0 | 2.83 | .897 |
| 2010–11 | Tappara | SM-l | 37 | 9 | 19 | 8 | 2,147 | 106 | 2 | 2.96 | .911 | — | — | — | — | — | — | — | — |
| 2010–11 | Worcester Sharks | AHL | 7 | 1 | 3 | 1 | 351 | 15 | 0 | 2.56 | .918 | — | — | — | — | — | — | — | — |
| 2011–12 | Worcester Sharks | AHL | 38 | 15 | 20 | 1 | 2,116 | 101 | 2 | 2.86 | .908 | — | — | — | — | — | — | — | — |
| 2012–13 | Worcester Sharks | AHL | 39 | 14 | 21 | 3 | 2,201 | 106 | 1 | 2.89 | .903 | — | — | — | — | — | — | — | — |
| 2013–14 | Worcester Sharks | AHL | 45 | 18 | 24 | 2 | 2,646 | 130 | 1 | 2.95 | .894 | — | — | — | — | — | — | — | — |
| 2014–15 | HC Vityaz | KHL | 45 | 17 | 21 | 5 | 2,603 | 128 | 3 | 2.95 | .911 | — | — | — | — | — | — | — | — |
| 2015–16 | HC Vityaz | KHL | 45 | 15 | 23 | 6 | 2,565 | 104 | 4 | 2.43 | .929 | — | — | — | — | — | — | — | — |
| 2016–17 | HC Vityaz | KHL | 42 | 20 | 16 | 5 | 2,424 | 101 | 2 | 2.50 | .929 | 4 | 0 | 4 | 216 | 20 | 0 | 5.56 | .875 |
| 2017–18 | Springfield Thunderbirds | AHL | 29 | 14 | 9 | 3 | 1,670 | 64 | 4 | 2.30 | .927 | — | — | — | — | — | — | — | — |
| 2017–18 | Florida Panthers | NHL | 9 | 4 | 4 | 0 | 493 | 24 | 0 | 2.92 | .911 | — | — | — | — | — | — | — | — |
| 2018–19 | Grand Rapids Griffins | AHL | 40 | 22 | 11 | 5 | 2,368 | 112 | 0 | 2.84 | .899 | 5 | 2 | 3 | 292 | 13 | 0 | 2.67 | .911 |
| 2019–20 | Sibir Novosibirsk | KHL | 43 | 20 | 13 | 4 | 2353 | 84 | 2 | 2.14 | .921 | 5 | 4 | 1 | 289 | 7 | 2 | 1.45 | .961 |
| 2020–21 | Sibir Novosibirsk | KHL | 47 | 21 | 21 | 3 | 2,646 | 100 | 3 | 2.27 | .922 | — | — | — | — | — | — | — | — |
| 2021–22 | Sibir Novosibirsk | KHL | 38 | 14 | 16 | 5 | 2,167 | 73 | 6 | 2.02 | .926 | 1 | 0 | 1 | 59 | 2 | 0 | 2.03 | .933 |
| 2021–22 | Arizona Coyotes | NHL | 6 | 2 | 2 | 1 | 298 | 21 | 0 | 4.22 | .866 | — | — | — | — | — | — | — | — |
| 2022–23 | EHC Biel-Bienne | NL | 35 | 22 | 8 | 1 | 2019 | 77 | 7 | 2.29 | .923 | 14 | 9 | 5 | — | — | 2 | 2.35 | .922 |
| 2023–24 | EHC Biel-Bienne | NL | 43 | 23 | 16 | 1 | 2569 | 98 | 5 | 2.29 | .919 | 7 | 2 | 4 | — | — | 0 | 2.17 | .925 |
| KHL totals | | | 260 | 107 | 110 | 28 | 14,757 | 590 | 20 | 2.40 | .923 | 10 | 4 | 6 | 564 | 29 | 2 | 3.08 | .922 |
| NHL totals | | | 15 | 6 | 6 | 1 | 791 | 45 | 0 | 3.41 | .895 | — | — | — | — | — | — | — | — |

=== International ===
| Year | Team | Event | Result | GP | W | L | OT | MIN | GA | SO | GAA | SV% |
|---|---|---|---|---|---|---|---|---|---|---|---|---|
| 2006 | Finland | U17 | 8th | 3 | 0 | 3 | 0 | — | — | — | 3.60 | .899 |
| 2007 | Finland | U18 | 7th | 4 | 1 | 2 | 0 | — | — | — | 3.27 | .899 |
| 2008 | Finland | WJC | 6th | 3 | 0 | 2 | 0 | 151 | 10 | 0 | 3.98 | .878 |
| 2009 | Finland | WJC | 7th | 2 | 0 | 2 | 0 | 119 | 7 | 0 | 3.54 | .870 |
| 2017 | Finland | WC | 4th | 6 | 3 | 2 | 0 | 318 | 12 | 1 | 2.26 | .916 |
| 2018 | Finland | WC | 5th | 5 | 4 | 1 | 0 | 299 | 7 | 1 | 1.41 | .939 |
| 2021 | Finland | WC | 2nd place, silver medalist(s) | 3 | 2 | 0 | 1 | 189 | 3 | 1 | 0.95 | .955 |
| 2022 | Finland | OG | 1st place, gold medalist(s) | 5 | 5 | 0 | 0 | 300 | 5 | 1 | 1.00 | .962 |
| 2022 | Finland | WC | 1st place, gold medalist(s) | 2 | 1 | 1 | 0 | 125 | 3 | 0 | 1.44 | .927 |
| 2024 | Finland | WC | 8th | 5 | 1 | 4 | 0 | 304 | 11 | 0 | 2.17 | .898 |
| Junior totals | | | | 12 | 1 | 9 | 0 | — | — | — | — | — |
| Senior totals | | | | 26 | 16 | 8 | 1 | 1,536 | 41 | 4 | 1.60 | .933 |
