= Lukáš Radil =

Czech ice hockey player (born 1990)

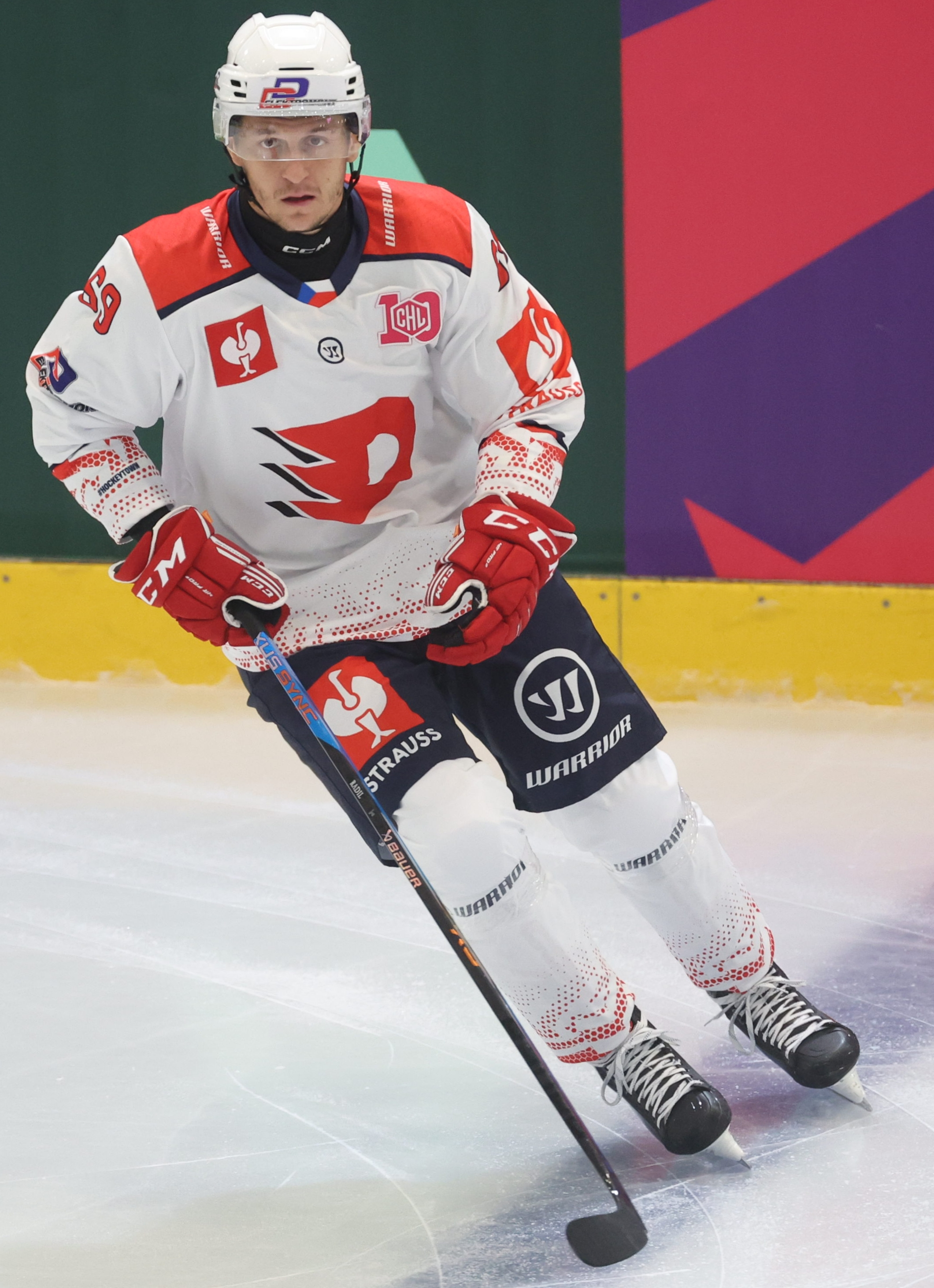
- Lukáš Radil, 2024
- Born: 5 August 1990 (age 36) Čáslav, Czechoslovakia
- Height: 6 ft 4 in (193 cm)
- Weight: 205 lb (93 kg; 14 st 9 lb)
- Position: Left wing
- Shoots: Left
- ELH team Former teams: HC Dynamo Pardubice; Spartak Moscow; San Jose Sharks; Dinamo Riga
- National team: Czech Republic
- NHL draft: Undrafted
- Playing career: 2008–present

Lukáš Radil (born 5 August 1990) is a Czech professional ice hockey forward currently playing for HC Dynamo Pardubice of the Czech Extraliga (ELH).

== Playing career ==
Radil began playing as a youth within the Pardubice organization. He made his professional debut with Pardubice at the end of the 2007–08 season, in the Czech Extraliga relegation round.

Undrafted and in his eighth season with Pardubice in 2014–15, Radil marked career highs with 29 assists and 39 points in 52 games. As a free agent, Radil left the Czech Republic for the first time in his career upon signing a one-year contract with Russian club, Spartak Moscow of the Kontinental Hockey League (KHL) on 4 June 2015.

In his first season with Spartak in 2015–16, Radil instantly added offence on the club's scoring line with 32 points in 57 games. He was re-signed to an improved two-year contract during the campaign on 21 January 2016.

At the conclusion of the 2017–18 season, his third with Spartak Moscow and having increased his points total in each season, Radil left as a free agent to pursue his National Hockey League ambitions by agreeing to a one-year contract with the San Jose Sharks on 4 April 2018. On 23 November 2018, Radil made his NHL debut, in a 4–0 victory against the Vancouver Canucks. On 8 December, Radil scored his first NHL goal in the Sharks' 5–3 win over the Arizona Coyotes. Having scored 9 points through his first 18 games, Radil was signed to a one-year contract extension with the Sharks on 6 January 2019.

In the following 2019–20 season, Radil was unable to solidify his role in the NHL with San Jose and was waived on 13 December 2019. A day later, he was reassigned to the Barracuda. He collected 16 points in 28 games with the Barracuda before the season was cancelled due to COVID-19.

With his tenure with the Sharks effectively ended, Radil as an impending free agent opted to return to Russia to join former club, Spartak Moscow of the KHL, on a one-year contract on 9 June 2020. In the following 2020–21 season, Radil regained his scoring touch with Spartak, posting 19 goals and 32 points through 55 regular season games.

As a free agent, Radil left Spartak for the second time, opting to continue in the KHL on a one-year deal with Latvian-based club, Dinamo Riga, on 29 June 2021.

== Career statistics ==
=== Regular season and playoffs ===
			Regular season					Playoffs
Season	Team	League	GP	G	A	Pts	PIM	GP	G	A	Pts	PIM
2005–06	HC Moeller Pardubice	CZE U18	47	8	18	26	20	5	1	1	2	2
2006–07	HC Moeller Pardubice	CZE U18	39	9	18	27	30	2	1	1	2	2
2007–08	HC Moeller Pardubice	CZE U20	40	4	17	21	32	6	4	3	7	2
2008–09	HC Moeller Pardubice	CZE U20	36	13	28	41	40	3	1	5	6	2
2008–09	HC Moeller Pardubice	ELH	17	0	2	2	0	—	—	—	—	—
2008–09	HC Chrudim	Czech.1	1	0	0	0	2	—	—	—	—	—
2009–10	HC Eaton Pardubice	CZE U20	19	10	20	30	10	3	1	3	4	0
2009–10	HC Eaton Pardubice	ELH	12	1	4	5	0	—	—	—	—	—
2009–10	HC Chrudim	Czech.1	31	9	12	21	20	—	—	—	—	—
2010–11	HC Eaton Pardubice	CZE U20	7	3	8	11	4	—	—	—	—	—
2010–11	HC Eaton Pardubice	ELH	29	1	4	5	6	4	0	0	0	0
2010–11	HC Chrudim	Czech.1	10	2	7	9	8	—	—	—	—	—
2010–11	HC Vrchlabí	Czech.1	2	2	0	2	0	4	2	4	6	0
2011–12	HC ČSOB Pojišťovna Pardubice	ELH	45	7	8	15	12	12	7	1	8	6
2011–12	HC VCES Hradec Králové	Czech.1	2	0	0	0	0	—	—	—	—	—
2012–13	HC ČSOB Pojišťovna Pardubice	ELH	27	1	4	5	6	4	0	0	0	0
2012–13	Královští Lvi Hradec Králové	Czech.1	4	2	3	5	10	—	—	—	—	—
2013–14	HC ČSOB Pojišťovna Pardubice	ELH	48	16	16	32	20	10	2	2	4	6
2014–15	HC ČSOB Pojišťovna Pardubice	ELH	52	10	29	39	22	9	3	3	6	2
2015–16	Spartak Moscow	KHL	57	13	19	32	30	—	—	—	—	—
2016–17	Spartak Moscow	KHL	56	12	21	33	50	—	—	—	—	—
2017–18	Spartak Moscow	KHL	51	16	22	38	12	4	0	0	0	2
2018–19	San Jose Barracuda	AHL	15	4	7	11	14	1	0	1	1	0
2018–19	San Jose Sharks	NHL	36	7	4	11	6	6	0	0	0	0
2019–20	San Jose Sharks	NHL	14	0	0	0	8	—	—	—	—	—
2019–20	San Jose Barracuda	AHL	28	6	10	16	8	—	—	—	—	—
2020–21	Spartak Moscow	KHL	55	19	13	32	22	3	0	0	0	25
2021–22	Dinamo Riga	KHL	43	8	15	23	26	—	—	—	—	—
2022–23	HC Dynamo Pardubice	ELH	49	14	26	40	30	11	2	2	4	2
2023–24	HC Dynamo Pardubice	ELH	52	21	25	46	18	16	5	6	11	18
ELH totals			331	71	118	189	114	66	19	14	33	34
KHL totals			262	68	90	158	140	7	0	0	0	27
NHL totals			50	7	4	11	14	6	0	0	0	0

=== International ===
Year	Team	Event	Result	GP	G	A	Pts	PIM
2017	Czech Republic	WC	7th	7	1	1	2	2
2018	Czech Republic	OG	4th	6	0	0	0	4
2021	Czech Republic	WC	7th	3	1	0	1	0
Senior totals				16	2	1	3	6
