= Ville Lajunen =

Finnish ice hockey player

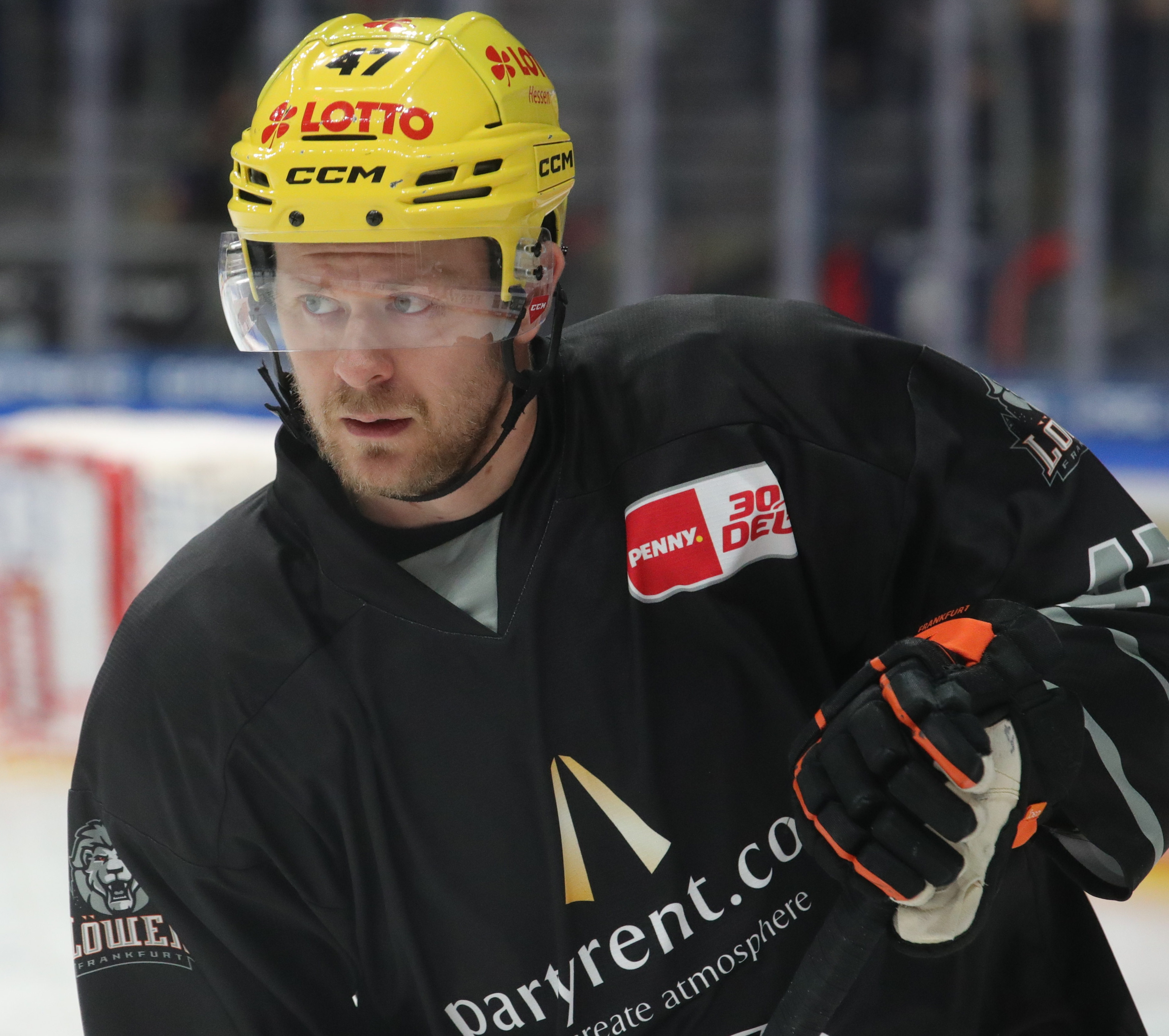
- Lajunen in 2023, while with the Löwen Frankfurt
- Born: 8 March 1988 (age 38) Helsinki, Finland
- Height: 6 ft 1 in (185 cm)
- Weight: 194 lb (88 kg; 13 st 12 lb)
- Position: Defence
- Shoots: Right
- Liiga team Former teams: Kiekko-Espoo; Metallurg Magnitogorsk; Färjestad BK; Jokerit; Spartak Moscow; Kunlun Red Star; HC Vityaz; HC TPS; Schwenninger Wild Wings; Löwen Frankfurt; HC Škoda Plzeň
- National team: Finland
- Playing career: 2007–present

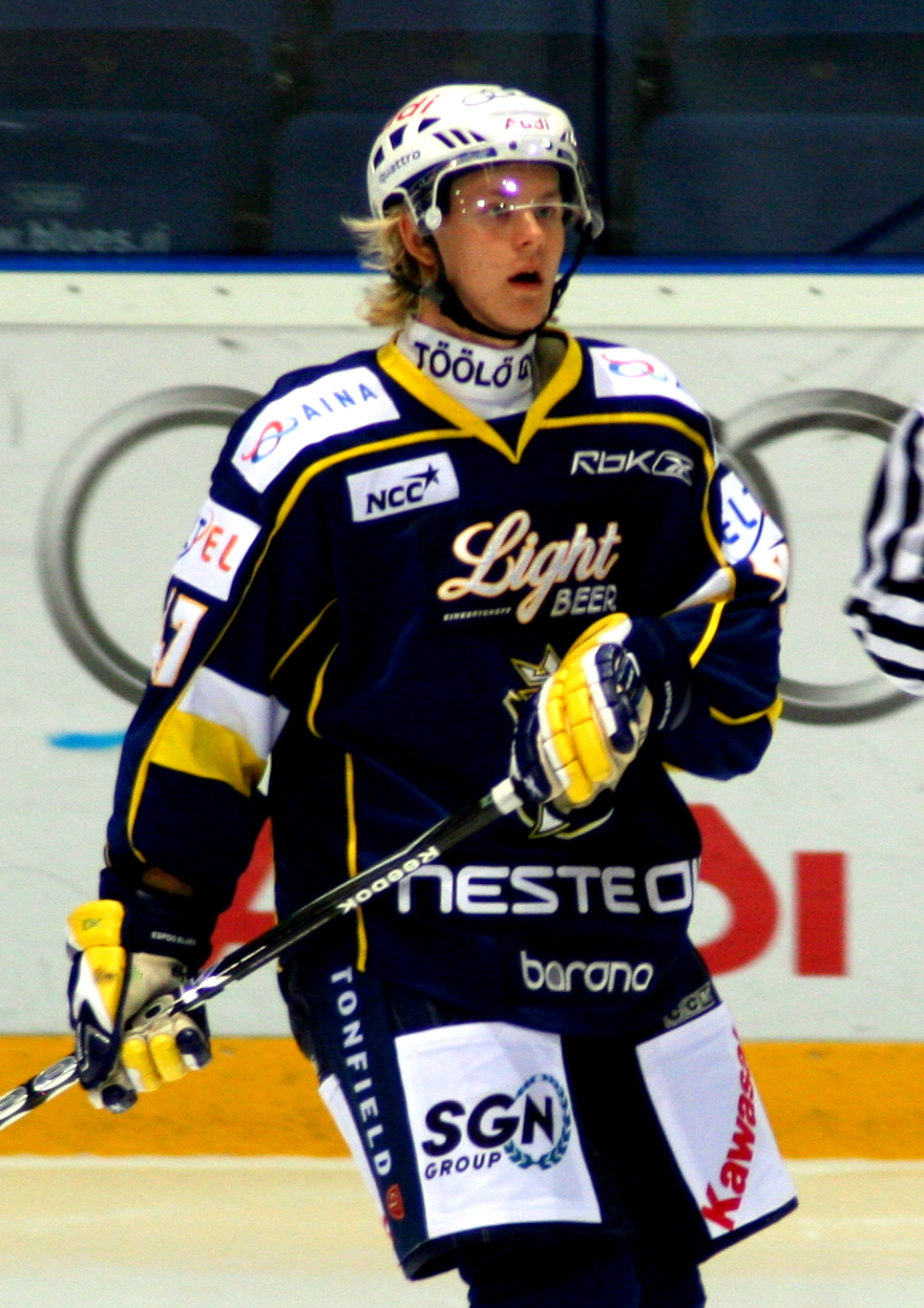
Lajunen (Espoo Blues 2009)

Ville Lajunen (born 8 March 1988) is a Finnish professional ice hockey defenceman who currently plays for Kiekko-Espoo in the Finnish Liiga.

== Playing career ==
Born in Helsinki, Lajunen played as a youth within the Espoo Blues program of the SM-liiga. While playing professionally for the Blues, he led the SM-liiga in assists (32) by a defenseman in the 2009–10 season.

On 18 November 2011, Lajunen left Espoo during the final year of his contract to join Metallurg Magnitogorsk in the KHL.

On 24 May 2017, Lajunen signed a one-year contract with HC Spartak Moscow of the KHL. After posting 26 points in 52 games from the blueline in the 2017–18 season, Lajunen left Spartak but continued in the KHL, agreeing to terms on a one-year contract with Chinese outfit, Kunlun Red Star, on 31 May 2018.

In the 2018–19 season, Lajunen was a steadying influence with Kunlun, contributing with 10 goals and 27 points in 56 regular season games. As a free agent at the conclusion of his contract, Lajunen left China, signing a one-year contract with HC Vityaz to remain in the KHL on 2 May 2019.

On 24 June 2022, Lajunen left HC TPS of the Liiga after two seasons and signed a one-year contract with German club, Schwenninger Wild Wings of the DEL, for the 2022–23 season.

== Career statistics ==
=== Regular season and playoffs ===
			Regular season					Playoffs
Season	Team	League	GP	G	A	Pts	PIM	GP	G	A	Pts	PIM
2005–06	Espoo Blues	Jr. A	22	2	2	4	10	10	0	0	0	6
2006–07	Espoo Blues	Jr. A	39	3	23	26	79	12	1	9	10	12
2006–07	Espoo Blues	SM-l	3	0	0	0	0	—	—	—	—	—
2007–08	Espoo Blues	Jr. A	3	1	2	3	10	3	0	2	2	6
2007–08	Espoo Blues	SM-l	19	1	11	12	29	9	1	0	1	6
2007–08	KooKoo	Mestis	20	2	9	11	24	—	—	—	—	—
2008–09	Espoo Blues	Jr. A	8	2	2	4	6	7	2	3	5	14
2008–09	Espoo Blues	SM-l	45	8	11	19	20	10	0	2	2	0
2009–10	Espoo Blues	SM-l	58	5	33	38	44	—	—	—	—	—
2010–11	Espoo Blues	SM-l	60	7	17	24	69	18	3	7	10	20
2011–12	Espoo Blues	SM-l	22	2	10	12	8	—	—	—	—	—
2011–12	Metallurg Magnitogorsk	KHL	15	0	1	1	4	12	0	5	5	0
2012–13	Färjestad BK	SEL	53	7	14	21	16	10	0	6	6	2
2013–14	Färjestad BK	SHL	48	4	9	13	20	15	0	4	4	2
2014–15	Jokerit	KHL	49	3	17	20	16	3	1	0	1	4
2015–16	Jokerit	KHL	58	9	19	28	32	6	1	1	2	4
2016–17	Jokerit	KHL	53	10	6	16	16	4	2	0	2	0
2017–18	Spartak Moscow	KHL	52	6	20	26	10	4	0	1	1	0
2018–19	Kunlun Red Star	KHL	56	10	17	27	44	—	—	—	—	—
2019–20	Vityaz	KHL	60	4	21	25	6	4	1	1	2	2
2020–21	TPS	Liiga	55	9	19	28	24	13	2	2	4	8
2021–22	TPS	Liiga	51	4	21	25	12	18	0	6	6	8
2022–23	Schwenninger Wild Wings	DEL	56	10	35	45	27	—	—	—	—	—
2023–24	Löwen Frankfurt	DEL	52	6	23	29	16	—	—	—	—	—
2024–25	Kiekko-Espoo	Liiga	57	13	21	34	54	5	0	1	1	2
2025-26	HC Škoda Plzeň	Czech	45	6	16	22	8	7	0	1	1	2
Liiga totals			370	49	143	192	260	73	6	18	24	44
KHL totals			343	42	102	144	128	33	5	8	13	10
SHL totals			101	11	23	34	36	25	0	10	10	4

Medal record

Representing Finland

Ice hockey

World Championships
Silver medal – second place	2014 Minsk	

=== International ===
Year	Team	Event	Result	GP	G	A	Pts	PIM
2008	Finland	WJC	6th	6	0	3	3	6
2014	Finland	WC	2nd place, silver medalist(s)	10	0	2	2	0
2017	Finland	WC	4th	10	1	2	3	2
Junior totals				6	0	3	3	6
Senior totals				20	1	4	5	2
