= Ilari Filppula =

Finnish professional ice hockey forward

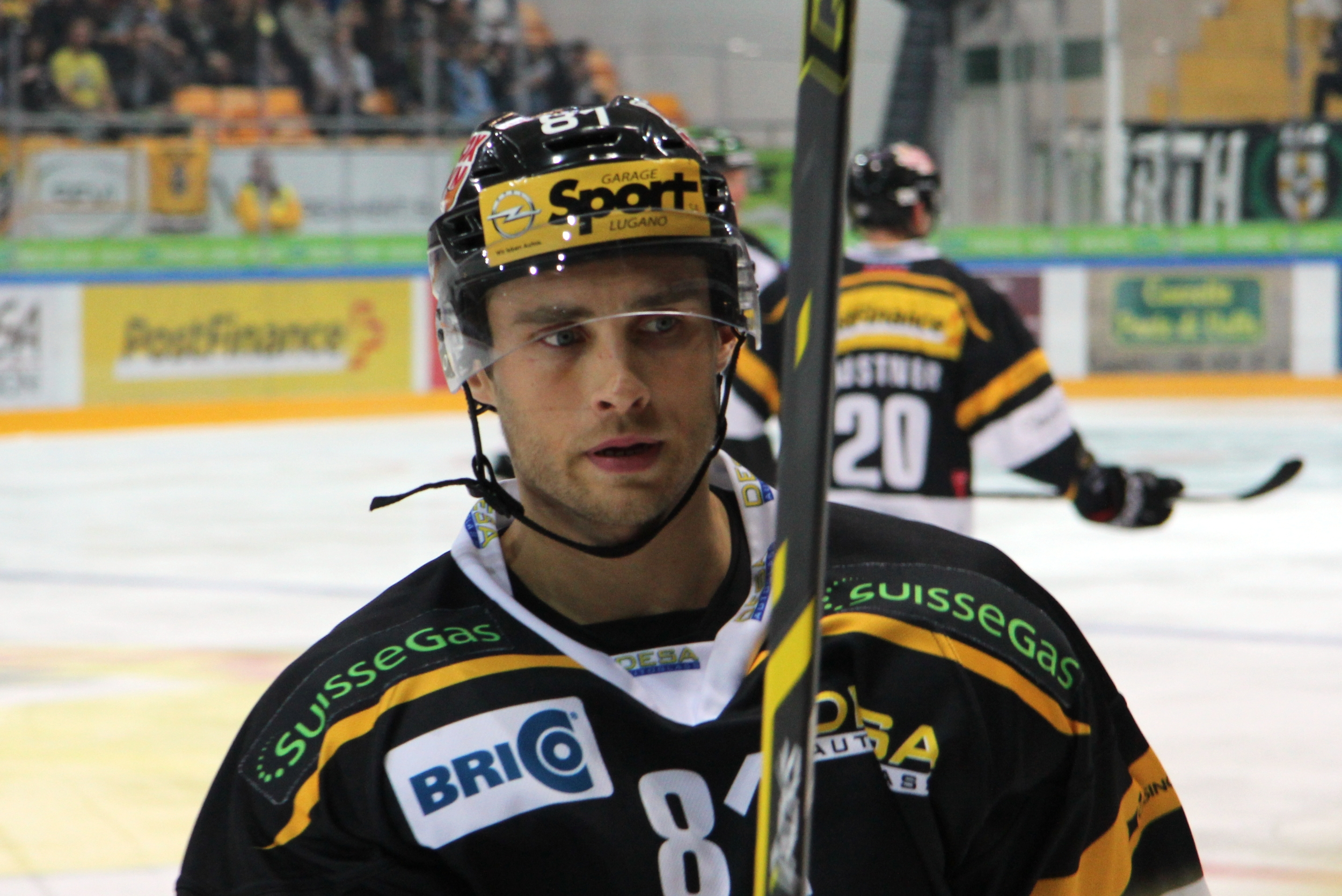
- Born: 5 November 1981 (age 44) Vantaa, Finland
- Height: 6 ft 0 in (183 cm)
- Weight: 190 lb (86 kg; 13 st 8 lb)
- Position: Centre
- Shot: Left
- Liiga team Former teams: TPS; Jokerit; JYP Jyväskylä; Grand Rapids Griffins; CSKA Moscow; HC Lugano; Modo Hockey; Malmö Redhawks
- National team: Finland
- NHL draft: Undrafted
- Playing career: 2001–2020

Ilari Antti Sakari Filppula (born 5 November 1981) is a Finnish professional ice hockey forward currently playing for the TPS in the Finnish Liiga. He is the older brother of Valtteri Filppula.

== Playing career ==
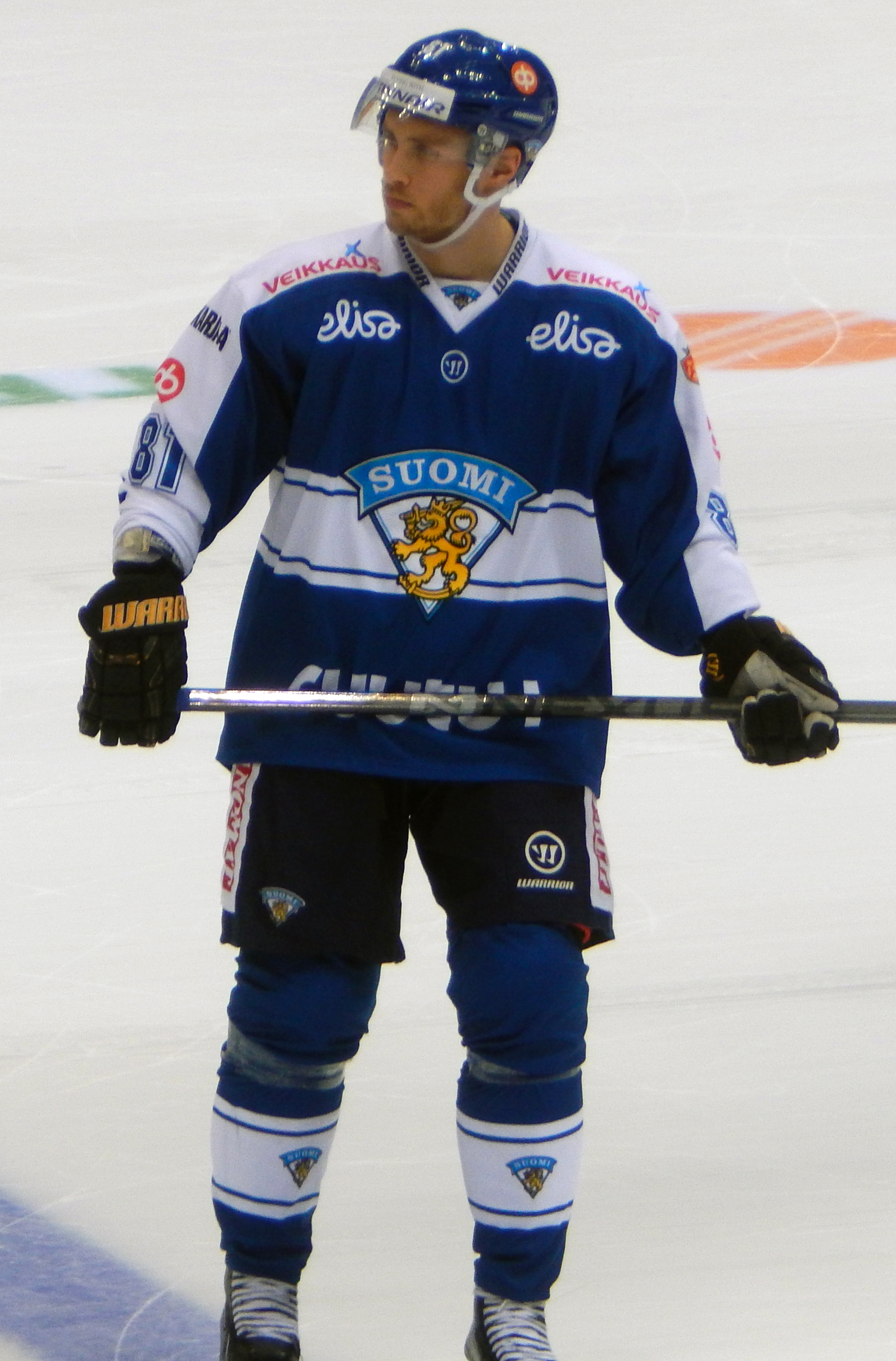
Ilari Filppula in Finnish national team

Filppula started his pro career in Kiekko-Vantaa, in the Finnish lower leagues, and after two years with JYP, he spent a season with Jokerit, and then returned to JYP with a two-year contract. In 2008, he signed a 2-year contract with TPS. Filppula won the Jari Kurri trophy in 2010.

On 15 June 2010, Filppula signed a one-year, two-way contract with the Detroit Red Wings. The Red Wings assigned Filppula to their AHL affiliate, the Grand Rapids Griffins, during training camp. In his first season in North America, Filppula participated in the AHL All-Star game and finished the season first on the Grand Rapids Griffins in assists and points.

Despite leading the Griffins with 64 points, Filppula was not given an opportunity in the NHL with the Red Wings, and on 19 May 2011, he returned to Finland with Jokerit, signing a four-year deal. In 2013 he signed a one-year contract with HC CSKA Moscow of the Kontinental Hockey League.

After the 2013–14 season, Filppula left the KHL to sign a two-year contract with Swiss club, HC Lugano of the National League A on 8 April. 2014. In the final year of his contract in Lugano, Filppula moved in a mid-season transfer to the SHL, signing for the remainder of the 2015–16 campaign with Modo Hockey.

Unable to help Modo retain their SHL status, Filppula left the club in the off-season, signing a one-year deal to remain in the top-flight league with the Malmö Redhawks on 9 April 2016. He returned to TPS in Finnish Liiga for season 2017–18.

== Career statistics ==
			Regular season					Playoffs
Season	Team	League	GP	G	A	Pts	PIM	GP	G	A	Pts	PIM
1996–97	Kiekko–Vantaa	FIN U16	32	17	18	35	14	—	—	—	—	—
1996–97	Kiekko–Vantaa	FIN.2 U20	1	0	2	2	0	—	—	—	—	—
1997–98	Kiekko–Vantaa	FIN.2 U18	—	—	—	—	—	21	10	17	27	12
1998–99	Kiekko–Vantaa	FIN.2 U20	19	7	5	12	4	—	—	—	—	—
1999–2000	Kiekko–Vantaa	FIN.2 U20	14	8	25	33	10	14	9	14	23	29
1999–2000	Kiekko–Vantaa	FIN.3	2	0	0	0	0	—	—	—	—	—
2000–01	Jokerit	FIN U20	38	18	40	58	16	2	1	0	1	0
2001–02	Kiekko–Vantaa	Mestis	44	13	22	35	20	5	4	2	6	2
2002–03	Jokerit	SM-l	1	0	0	0	0	—	—	—	—	—
2002–03	Kiekko–Vantaa	Mestis	41	13	22	35	20	5	4	2	6	2
2003–04	JYP	SM-l	47	3	6	9	12	1	0	0	0	0
2004–05	JYP	SM-l	55	8	10	18	10	3	1	0	1	0
2005–06	Jokerit	SM-l	56	9	16	25	14	—	—	—	—	—
2006–07	JYP	SM-l	54	16	26	42	42	—	—	—	—	—
2007–08	JYP	SM-l	56	7	15	22	20	6	0	1	1	0
2008–09	TPS	SM-l	48	6	17	23	47	8	0	3	3	6
2009–10	TPS	SM-l	58	12	37	49	24	15	2	12	14	8
2010–11	Grand Rapids Griffins	AHL	76	20	44	64	24	—	—	—	—	—
2011–12	Jokerit	SM-l	44	10	21	31	10	10	4	4	8	2
2012–13	Jokerit	SM-l	53	19	35	54	36	—	—	—	—	—
2013–14	CSKA Moscow	KHL	51	8	16	24	16	4	0	0	0	2
2014–15	HC Lugano	NLA	37	12	21	33	10	5	1	4	5	0
2015–16	HC Lugano	NLA	27	7	11	18	14	—	—	—	—	—
2015–16	Modo Hockey	SHL	15	1	7	8	4	—	—	—	—	—
2016–17	Malmö Redhawks	SHL	48	13	20	33	43	13	1	10	11	4
2017–18	TPS	Liiga	35	5	32	37	26	11	1	9	10	4
2018–19	TPS	Liiga	44	12	23	35	28	4	1	1	2	2
2019–20	TPS	Liiga	58	7	33	40	34	—	—	—	—	—
Liiga totals			609	114	271	385	297	64	10	33	43	22
