= 2020 Channel One Cup =

Tournament details
- Host country: Russia
- City: Moscow
- Venue: 1 (in 1 host city)
- Dates: 17–20 December 2020
- Teams: 5

Final positions
- Champions: Russia (18th title)
- Runners-up: Sweden
- Third place: Czech Republic
- Fourth place: Finland

Tournament statistics
- Games played: 6
- Goals scored: 35 (5.83 per game)
- Attendance: 0 (0 per game)
- Scoring leader: (Czech Republic) Milan Gulas (5 points)

The 2020 Channel One Cup was played between 17 and 20 December 2020. Czech Republic, Finland, Sweden and Russia played in the tournament. All of the matches wa playetd in CSKA Arena in Moscow, Russia, The tournament was part of 2020–21 Euro Hockey Tour. It was won by Russia.

== Standings ==
Pos	Team	Pld	W	OTW	OTL	L	GF	GA	GD	Pts
1	Russia	3	2	1	0	0	13	5	+8	8
2	Sweden	3	1	0	1	1	8	9	−1	4
3	Czech Republic	3	1	0	0	2	8	9	−1	3
4	Finland	3	1	0	0	2	6	12	−6	3

Source: eurohockey

== Games ==
All times are local. Moscow – (Eastern European Time – UTC+2)

17 December 2020; 14:30	Finland	4-3 (2-1, 2-2, 0-0)	Czech Republic	CSKA Arena, Moscow

Game reference

Jussi Olkinuora
Goalies
Dominik Furch

Sund (Ilomäki, Ojamäki) – 03:16	1-0
	1-1	12:10 – Jašek (Lenc, Masin)
Ruohomaa (Karjalainen, Ojamäki) (PP) – 17:45	2-1
Karjalainen (Lindbohm, Junttila) – 22:05	3-1
	3-2	22:21 – Lakatoš (Zboril)
Rantakari (Kaski, Nättinen) (PP) – 33:44	4-2
	4-3	34:46 – Dmitrij Jaskin (Jašek, Nestrasil) (PP)

10 min
Penalties
8 min
31
Shots
20

17 December 2020; 19:30	Sweden	3-4 GWS (0-0, 1-1, 2-2) (OT: 0–0) (SO: 0–1)	Russia	CSKA Arena, Moscow

Game reference

Magnus Hellberg
Goalies
Alexander Samonov

Åberg (Dahlbäck, Rasmussen) – 24:12	1-0
	1-1	34:10 – Kuzmenko (Morozov, Yakovlev)
Pettersson (Åberg, Kempe) – 46:36	2-1
	2-2	49:17 – Soshnikov (Yakovlev, Shipachyov)
	2-3	50:44 – Shipachyov (Chibisov, Morozov) (PP)
Larsson (Fantenberg) – 55:33	3-3

Shootout
Kuzmenko
8 min
Penalties
8 min
22
Shots
26

19 December 2020; 11:00	Finland	1-4 (0-0, 0-2, 1-2)	Sweden	CSKA Arena, Moscow

Game reference

Janne Juvonen
Goalies
Anders Lindbäck
Referees:
(Russia) Roman Gofman
(Russia) Sergei Morozov

	0-1	29:31 – Lindberg (Kempe, Pettersson) (PP)
	0-2	37:27 – Lindberg (Holm, Åberg)
	0-3	47:34 – Frödén (Berggren, Wingerli)
Turunen (Pesonen, Kaski) (PP) – 56:28	1-3
	1-4	59:57 – Kempe (EN)

4 min
Penalties
12 min
21
Shots
21

19 December 2020; 11:00	Russia	4-1 (2-1, 0-0, 2-0)	Czech Republic	CSKA Arena, Moscow

Game reference

Alexander Samonov
Goalies
Roman Will
Referees:
(Russia) Denis Naumov
(Russia) Yevgeny Romasko

Burdasov (Samorukov, Ozhiganov) – 06:54	1-0
Kuzmenko (Morozov) – 09:44	2-0
	2-1	15:11 – Sedlak (Lenc, Sklenička)
Mamin (Marchenko, Chibisov) – 40:50	3-1
Mamin (EN) – 57:08	4-1

8 min
Penalties
22 min
23
Shots
34

20 December 2020; 11:00	Czech Republic	4-1 (0-1, 3-0, 1-0)	Sweden	CSKA Arena, Moscow

Game reference

Šimon Hrubec
Goalies
Anders Lindbäck
Referees:
(Russia) Sergei Morozov
(Russia) Sergei Yudakov

	0-1	12:33 – Berggren (Pääjärvi-Svensson, Rasmussen) (PP)
Lenc (Pýcha, Zboril) – 24:54	1-1
Blümel (Kostalek) – 35:12	2-1
Gazda (Jašek, Nestrasil) – 39:22	3-1
Pýcha (Zboril) – 55:23	4-1

12 min
Penalties
2 min
24
Shots
31

20 December 2020; 15:30	Russia	5-1 (1-0, 2-1, 2-0)	Finland	CSKA Arena, Moscow

Game reference

Alexander Samonov
Goalies
Jussi Olkinuora
Referees:
(Russia) Denis Naumov
(Russia) Yuri Oskirko

Shipachyov (Yakovlev) – 13:06	1-0
Voronkov (Mamin) – 23:13	2-0
Voronkov (Karnaukhov, Tolchinsky) – 28:23	3-0
	3-1	36:26 – Pesonen
Karnaukhov (SHG) – 58:27	4-1
Kuzmenko (Soshnikov) – 59:47	5-1

2 min
Penalties
4 min
21
Shots
22

== Scoring leaders ==
Pos	Player	Country	GP	G	A	Pts	+/−	PIM	POS
1	Milan Gulas	Czech Republic	3	3	2	5	+3	0	F
2	Jan Kovar	Czech Republic	3	3	1	4	+1	0	F
3	Nikita Gusev	Russia	3	0	4	4	+4	0	F
4	Sakari Manninen	Finland	3	3	0	3	+1	0	F
5	Jere Karjalainen	Finland	3	2	1	3	+3	0	D

GP = Games played; G = Goals; A = Assists; Pts = Points; +/− = Plus/minus; PIM = Penalties in minutes; POS = Position
Source: quanthockey
