= 2021 Sweden Hockey Games =

2021 Beijer Hockey Games (Euro Hockey Tour)
Tournament details
- Host country: Sweden
- City: Malmö
- Venue: 1 (in 1 host city)
- Dates: 11–14 February 2021
- Teams: 4

Final positions
- Champions: Russia (5th title)
- Runners-up: Sweden
- Third place: Finland
- Fourth place: Czech Republic

Tournament statistics
- Games played: 6
- Goals scored: 32 (5.33 per game)
- Attendance: 0 (0 per game)
- Scoring leader(s): (Russia) Vladimir Butuzov (Czech Republic) Michael Spacek (4 points)

Official website
- swehockey

The 2021 Beijer Hockey Games was played between 11 and 14 February 2021. The Czech Republic, Finland, Sweden and Russia played a round-robin for a total of three games per team and six games in total, all games were played in Malmö, Sweden. Russia won the tournament. The tournament was part of the 2020–21 Euro Hockey Tour.

Due to COVID-19 pandemic spectators were not allowed.

== Standings ==
Pos	Team	Pld	W	OTW	OTL	L	GF	GA	GD	Pts
1	Russia	3	2	1	0	0	12	7	+5	8
2	Sweden	3	1	1	1	0	7	4	+3	6
3	Finland	3	0	1	0	2	5	8	−3	2
4	Czech Republic	3	0	0	2	1	8	13	−5	2

Source: swehockey

== Games ==
All times are local. Malmö – (Central European Time – UTC+1)

11 February 2021; 15:00	Russia	3-2 (2-0, 0-1, 1-1)	Finland	Malmö Arena, Malmö; Attendance: 0

Game reference

Alexander Samonov
Goalies
Harri Säteri
Referees:
(Sweden) Mikael Nord
(Sweden) Mikael Sjöqvist
Linesmen:
(Sweden) Andreas Malmqvist
(Sweden) Anders Nyqvist

13:31 – Minulin (Chekhovich, Zhafyarov)	1-0
16:06 – Chekhovich (Zhafyarov, Zborovsky)	2-0
	2-1	33:52 – Innala (Ojamäki)
42:37 – Butuzov (Kovalenko)	3-1
	3-2	59:38 – Puustinen (Aaltonen, Ruohomaa)

8 min
Penalties
2 min
16
Shots
22

11 February 2021; 19:00	Czech Republic	2-3 OT (1-1, 0-1, 1-0) (OT: 0–1)	Sweden	Malmö Arena, Malmö; Attendance: 0

Game reference

Patrik Bartosak
Goalies
Viktor Fasth
Referees:
(Sweden) Tobias Björk
(Sweden) Linus Öhlund
Linesmen:
(Sweden) Daniel Persson
(Sweden) Ludvig Lundgren

05:00 – Smejkal (Moravcik, Tomasek)	1-0
	1-1	16:04 – Lundkvist (Persson, Pettersson)
	1-2	35:45 – Holmberg (Berggren, Lundberg)
45:53 – Lenc (Stransky, Spacek)	2-2
	2-3	62:08 – Johansson (Holmberg)

8 min
Penalties
10 min
24
Shots
25

13 February 2021; 12:00	Finland	3-2 GWS (0-1, 0-0, 2-1) (OT: 0–0) (SO: 1–0)	Czech Republic	Malmö Arena, Malmö; Attendance: 0

Game reference

Janne Juvonen
Goalies
Patrik Bartosak
Referees:
(Sweden) Mikael Nord
(Sweden) Linus Öhlund
Linesmen:
(Sweden) Andreas Malmqvist
(Sweden) Ludvig Lundgren

	0-1	01:21 – Blumel ( Kodýtek)
	0-2	43:43 – Lenc (Stransky, Spacek)
46:21 – Turunen (Tiivola, Koivisto)	1-2
51:24 – Saarijärvi (Innala, Lundell)	2-2

M.Aaltonen (miss)
T.Turunen (miss)
A.Lundell (miss)
V.Saarijärvi
Shootout
(miss) M.Stransky
(miss) M.Birner
(miss) R.Lenc
(miss) M.Spacek
(miss) D.Tomasek
8 min
Penalties
12 min
23
Shots
32

13 February 2021; 16:00	Sweden	1-2 GWS (0-0, 1-1, 0-0) (OT: 0–0) (SO: 0–1)	Russia	Malmö Arena, Malmö; Attendance: 0

Game reference
Viktor Fasth	Goalies	Alexander Samonov	Referees: (Sweden) Mikael Nord (Sweden) Linus Öhlund; Linesmen: (Russia) Emil Yletyinen (Sweden) Anders Nyqvist
26:10 – Pettersson (Holmberg, Viksten) / 1-0; / 1-1 / 36:42 – Moiseyev (Chibrikov, Shmelyov)			Referees: (Sweden) Mikael Nord (Sweden) Linus Öhlund; Linesmen: (Russia) Emil Yletyinen (Sweden) Anders Nyqvist
E.Pettersson (miss); N.Lundkvist (miss); A.Bengtsson (miss); J.Frödén (miss); D.Viksten (miss)	Shootout	(miss) V.Podkolzin; (miss) D.Zhafyarov; V.Butuzov; (miss) I.Chekhovich	Referees: (Sweden) Mikael Nord (Sweden) Linus Öhlund; Linesmen: (Russia) Emil Yletyinen (Sweden) Anders Nyqvist
16 min	Penalties	8 min	Referees: (Sweden) Mikael Nord (Sweden) Linus Öhlund; Linesmen: (Russia) Emil Yletyinen (Sweden) Anders Nyqvist
30	Shots	21	Referees: (Sweden) Mikael Nord (Sweden) Linus Öhlund; Linesmen: (Russia) Emil Yletyinen (Sweden) Anders Nyqvist

14 February 2021; 12:00	Russia	7-4 (1-1, 1-2, 5-1)	Czech Republic	Malmö Arena, Malmö; Attendance: 0

Game reference

Yaroslav Askarov
Goalies
Dominik Hrachovina
Referees:
(Russia) Evgeny Romasko
(Russia) Iurii Oskirko
Linesmen:
(Sweden) Andreas Malmqvist
(Sweden) Ludvig Lundgren

07:29 – Bardakov (Chibrikov, Kirsanov)	1-0
	1-1	16:18 – Spacek (Lenc, Sulak)
	1-2	29:24 – Flek (Smejkal)
	1-3	30:37 – Klok ([[]], [[]])
37:04 – Kraskovsky (Kovalenko)	2-3
48:34 – Kovalenko (Misyul)	3-3
52:58 – Misyul (Podkolzin, Butuzov)	4-3
54:11 – Podkolzin	5-3
57:26 – Butuzov	6-3
57:46 – Chibrikov (Bardakov, Podkolzin)	7-3
	7-4	59:05 – Tomasek

34 min
Penalties
12 min
31
Shots
36

14 February 2021; 16:00	Sweden	3-0 (0-0, 2-0, 1-0)	Finland	Malmö Arena, Malmö; Attendance: 0

Game reference

Christoffer Rifalk
Goalies
Harri Säteri
Referees:
(Sweden) Mikael Nord
(Sweden) Mikael Holm
Linesmen:
(Sweden) Andreas Malmqvist
(Sweden) Ludvig Lundgren

26:05 – Friberg (Olofsson, Hansson)	1-0
28:54 – Jesper Sellgren (Ryfors, Zaar)	2-0
40:24 – Hållander	3-0

4 min
Penalties
4 min
20
Shots
14

== Scoring leaders ==
Pos	Player	Country	GP	G	A	Pts	+/−	PIM	POS
1	Vladimir Butuzov	Russia	3	3	1	4	+4	4	RW
2	Michael Špaček	Czech Republic	3	1	3	4	+2	4	RW
3	Radan Lenc	Czech Republic	3	2	1	3	+2	2	RW
4	Nikita Chibrikov	Russia	3	1	2	3	+4	2	RW
4	Vasily Podkolzin	Russia	3	1	2	3	+4	2	RW

GP = Games played; G = Goals; A = Assists; Pts = Points; +/− = Plus/minus; PIM = Penalties in minutes; POS = Position
Source: swehockey

== Goaltending leaders ==
Pos	Player	Country	TOI	GA	GAA	Sv%	SO
1	Alexander Samonov	Russia	125:00	3	1.44	94.23	0
2	Viktor Fasth	Sweden	127:08	3	1.42	93.18	0
3	Patrik Bartošák	Czech Republic	127:08	5	2.36	89.36	0
4	Harri Säteri	Finland	116:20	6	3.09	83.33	0

TOI = Time on ice (minutes:seconds); SA = Shots against; GA = Goals against; GAA = Goals Against Average; Sv% = Save percentage; SO = Shutouts
Source: swehockey
