= 2021 Carlson Hockey Games =

2021 Carlson Hockey Games (Euro Hockey Games)
Tournament details
- Host country: Czechia
- City: Prague
- Venue: 1 (in 1 host city)
- Dates: 12–15 May 2021
- Teams: 4

Final positions
- Champions: Czech Republic (8th title)
- Runners-up: Sweden
- Third place: Finland
- Fourth place: Russia

Tournament statistics
- Games played: 6
- Goals scored: 32 (5.33 per game)
- Attendance: 3,000 (500 per game)
- Scoring leader: (Finland) Jere Karjalainen (4 points)

The 2021 Carlson Hockey Games was played between 12 and 15 May 2021. The Czech Republic, Finland, Sweden and Russia played a round-robin for a total of three games per team and six games in total. All games were played in Prague, Czech Republic. The tournament was won by the Czech Republic.The tournament was part of the 2020–21 Euro Hockey Tour.

== Standings ==
Pos	Team	Pld	W	OTW	OTL	L	GF	GA	GD	Pts
1	Czech Republic	3	2	1	0	0	9	3	+6	8
2	Sweden	3	1	0	1	1	9	11	−2	4
3	Finland	3	1	0	0	2	7	6	+1	3
4	Russia	3	1	0	0	2	7	12	−5	3

Source: eurohockey

== Games ==
All times are local. Prague – (Central European Summer Time

12 May 2021; 16:00	Sweden	4–6 (1–1, 1–3, 2–2)	Russia	O2 Arena, Prague; Attendance: 0

Game reference

Adam Reideborn
Goalies
Alexander Samonov
Referees:
(Czech Republic) Vladimír Pešina
(Czech Republic) Jakub Šindel

08:11 – Oscar Lindberg (Pär Lindholm, Viktor Lööv)	1–0
	1–1	13:54 – Igor Ozhiganov (Artyom Shvets-Rogovoi, Vladislav Kamenev)
	1–2	21:29 – Anton Burdasov
	1–3	22:57 – Emil Galimov (Konstantin Okulov, Anton Slepyshev) (PP)
31:31 – Jesper Frödén (Jonatan Berggren, Viktor Lööv))	2–3
	2–4	37:15 – Anton Burdasov (Igor Ozhiganov, Vasily Podkolzin) (PP)
	2–5	46:25 – Vladislav Kamenev
47:29 – Filip Hållander (Dennis Rasmussen, Klas Dahlbäck)	3–5
48:01 – Jonathan Pudas (Pär Lindholm, Max Friberg)	4–5
	4–6	49:41 – Vladislav Kamenev (EN)

14 min
Penalties
10 min
21
Shots
20

12 May 2021; 20:00	Finland	1–2 (1–0, 0–1, 0–1)	Czech Republic	O2 Arena, Prague; Attendance: 1,000

Game reference

Harri Säteri
Goalies
Roman Will
Referees:
(Czech Republic) René Hradil
(Czech Republic) Daniel Pražák

07:29 – Axel Rindell	1–0
	1–1	37:44 – Libor Šulák (Michael Spacek) (PP)
	1–2	48:48 – Matej Stransky (Ondřej Vitásek, Michael Spacek)

8 min
Penalties
4 min
22
Shots
37

13 May 2021; 16:00	Russia	1–4 (0–1, 0–0, 1–3)	Finland	O2 Arena, Prague; Attendance: 1,000

Game reference
Ivan Bocharov	Goalies	Jussi Olkinuora	Referees: (Czech Republic) Vladimír Pešina (Czech Republic) Daniel Pražák
44:14 – Maxim Shalunov / Goals / 04:51 – Axel Rindell (Jere Sallinen, Juuso Puustinen)) (PP); 50:13 – Jere Karjalainen (Peter Tiivola); 50:45 – Teemu Turunen; 59:34 – Jere Karjalainen (Eemeli Suomi)			Referees: (Czech Republic) Vladimír Pešina (Czech Republic) Daniel Pražák
10 min	Penalties	4 min	Referees: (Czech Republic) Vladimír Pešina (Czech Republic) Daniel Pražák
23	Shots	23	Referees: (Czech Republic) Vladimír Pešina (Czech Republic) Daniel Pražák

13 May 2021; 20:00	Czech Republic	3–2 OT (0–0, 0–1, 2–1) (OT: 1–0)	Sweden	O2 Arena, Prague; Attendance: 1,000

Game reference

Šimon Hrubec
Goalies
Adam Reideborn
Referees:
(Czech Republic) René Hradil
(Czech Republic) Adam Kika

	0–1	25:38 – Max Friberg (Pär Lindholm)
43:14 – Filip Zadina (Michael Spacek)	1–1
	1–2	54:12 – Pär Lindholm (Max Friberg, Jesper Frödén)
56:15 – Filip Zadina (Filip Hronek) (PP)	2–2
62:27 – Matej Stransky (Michael Spacek)	3–2

2 min
Penalties
10 min
20
Shots
17

15 May 2021; 11:00	Sweden	3–2 (1–0, 0–1, 2–1)	Finland	O2 Arena, Prague; Attendance: 0

Game reference

Adam Reideborn
Goalies
Jussi Olkinuora
Referees:
(Czech Republic) Vladimír Pešina
(Czech Republic) Jakub Šindel

06:46 – Jesper Frödén (Nils Lundkvist, Oscar Lindberg) (PP)	1–0
	1–1	23:54 – Anton Lundell (Oliwer Kaski, Jere Karjalainen) (PP)
48:31 – Filip Hållander (Nils Lundkvist, Jesper Sellgren)	2–1
59:00 – Dennis Rasmussen (Oscar Lindberg, Mario Kempe) (EN)	3–1
	3–2	59:59 – Jere Sallinen (Oliwer Kaski, Jere Karjalainen)

6 min
Penalties
6 min
26
Shots
10

15 May 2021; 15:00	Czech Republic	4–0 (1–0, 2–0, 1–0)	Russia	O2 Arena, Prague; Attendance: 0

Game reference

Šimon Hrubec
Goalies
Ivan Fedotov Alexander Samonov
Referees:
(Czech Republic) René Hradil
(Czech Republic) Adam Kika

10:02 – Filip Zadina	1–0
20:36 – Jiri Sekac (PEN)	2–0
31:32 – Jakub Flek (Jiri Smejkal)	3–0
40:54 – Tomas Zohorna (Libor Šulák, Filip Chytil)	4–0

22 min
Penalties
24 min
21
Shots
34

== Scoring leaders ==
Pos	Player	Country	GP	G	A	Pts	+/−	PIM	POS
1	Jere Karjalainen	Finland	3	2	2	4	+3	2	F
2	Pär Lindholm	Sweden	3	1	3	4	+1	4	F
3	Michael Špaček	Czech Republic	3	0	4	4	+2	0	F
4	Filip Zadina	Czech Republic	3	3	0	3	+2	0	F
5	Vladislav Kamenev	Russia	3	2	1	3	+2	14	F

GP = Games played; G = Goals; A = Assists; Pts = Points; +/− = Plus/minus; PIM = Penalties in minutes; POS = Position
Source: quanthockey
