= 2019 Karjala Tournament =

2019 Karjala Tournament (Euro Hockey Games)
Tournament details
- Host countries: Finland; Sweden
- Cities: Helsinki; Leksand
- Venues: 2 (in 2 host cities)
- Dates: 7–10 November 2019
- Teams: 4

Final positions
- Champions: Czech Republic (2nd title)
- Runners-up: Finland
- Third place: Russia
- Fourth place: Sweden

Tournament statistics
- Games played: 6
- Goals scored: 31 (5.17 per game)
- Attendance: 44,551 (7,425 per game)
- Scoring leader: (Finland) Sakari Manninen (3 points)

Official website
- leijonat.com

The 2019 Karjala Tournament was played between 7 and 10 November 2019. The Czech Republic, Finland, Sweden and Russia played a round-robin for a total of three games per team and six games in total. One match was played in Leksand, Sweden; the rest of the matches were played in Helsinki, Finland. The Czech Republic won the tournament. The tournament was part of 2019–20 Euro Hockey Tour.

== Standings ==
Pos	Team	Pld	W	OTW	OTL	L	GF	GA	GD	Pts
1	Czech Republic	3	2	1	0	0	9	3	+6	8
2	Finland	3	2	0	1	0	8	7	+1	7
3	Russia	3	0	1	0	2	8	11	−3	2
4	Sweden	3	0	0	1	2	6	10	−4	1

Source: eurohockey

== Games ==
All times are local. Helsinki – (Eastern European Time – UTC+2)

7 November 2019; 18:30	Russia	3-4 (1-0, 1-2, 1-2)	Finland	Helsinki Halli, Helsinki; Attendance: 9,421

Game reference

Ivan Bocharov
Goalies
Harri Säteri
Referees:
(Sweden) Mikael Nord
(Sweden) Andreas Harnebring

05:29 – Damir Sharipzyanov (Anton Burdasov, Andrei Kuzmenko)	1-0
	1-1	30:18 – Harri Pesonen (Mikko Lehtonen, Sakari Manninen) (PP)
	1-2	32:42 – Sakari Manninen (PEN)
33:20 – Rushan Rafikov (Damir Zhafyarov)	2-2
45:21 – Rushan Rafikov (Anton Burdasov, Konstantin Okulov)	3-2
	3-3	47:21 – Miro Aaltonen (Toni Rajala, Juuso Hietanen) (PP)
	3-4	50:53 – Harri Pesonen (Jesse Puljujärvi, Ville Pokka)

22 min
Penalties
10 min
32
Shots
22

7 November 2019; 18:30	Czech Republic	3-1 (0-0, 2-1, 1-0)	Sweden	Tegera Arena, Leksand; Attendance: 5,078

Game reference

Roman Will
Goalies
Adam Reideborn
Referees:
(Russia) Sergey Morozov
(Russia) Ivan Fateev

24:47 – Dmitrij Jaskin (Jakub Krejcik)	1-0
	1-1	30:50 – Mikael Wikstrand (Anton Rödin)
34:36 – Jan Kovář (Andrej Nestrasil) (PP)	2-1
58:12 – Michal Repik (Andrej Nestrasil) (EN)	3-1

8 min
Penalties
6 min
31
Shots
22

9 November 2019; 13:30	Sweden	4-5 GWS (0-2, 1-1, 3-1) (OT: 0–0) (SO: 0–1)	Russia	Helsinki Halli, Helsinki; Attendance: 3,252

Game reference

Magnus Hellberg
Goalies
Igor Bobkov
Referees:
(Finland) Lassi Heikkinen
(Finland) Joonas Kova

	0-1	10:52 – Anton Slepyshev (Konstantin Okulov)
	0-2	14:12 – Damir Zhafyarov (Artyom Sergeyev, Kirill Semyonov)
29:55 – Carl Klingberg (PEN)	1-2
	1-3	34:25 – Kirill Semyonov (Damir Zhafyarov, Artyom Sergeyev) (PP)
48:19 – Mikael Wikstrand (Anton Rödin, Max Friberg) (PP)	2-3
	2-4	51:25 – Nikita Soshnikov (Andrei Kuzmenko, Anton Burdasov) (PP)
53:11 – Fredrik Händemark (Daniel Brodin))	3-4
57:43 – Niklas Hansson (Carl Klingberg, Linus Johansson)	4-4

Shootout
Soshnikov
22 min
Penalties
31 min
12
Shots
14

9 November 2019; 17:30	Finland	2-3 GWS (0-0, 1-1, 1-1) (OT: 0–0) (SO: 0–1)	Switzerland	Helsinki Halli, Helsinki; Attendance: 12,150

Game reference

Jussi Olkinuora
Goalies
Marek Langhamer
Referees:
(Sweden) Andreas Harnebring
(Sweden) Mikael Nord

22:41 – Juho Lammikko (Ville Pokka, Kristian Kuusela)	1-0
	1-1	37:45 – Jakub Jerabek (Radim Zohorna, Hynek Zohorna)
40:42 – Sakari Manninen (Ville Pokka, Petteri Lindbohm)	2-1
	2-2	58:51 – Tomáš Filippi (Tomas Zohorna)

Shootout
Krejcik
8 min
Penalties
10 min
28
Shots
27

10 November 2019; 13:30	Czech Republic	3-0 (1-0, 0-0, 2-0)	Russia	Helsinki Halli, Helsinki; Attendance: 2,207

Game reference

Roman Will
Goalies
Alexander Samonov
Referees:
(Finland) Mikko Kaukokari
(Finland) Kristian Vikman

10:32 – Jan Kovář (Michal Repik)	1-0
51:04 – Lukas Sedlak (PP)	2-0
59:45 – Andrej Nestrasil (EN)	3-0

12 min
Penalties
10 min
23
Shots
32

10 November 2019; 17:30	Finland	2-1 (1-0, 1-1, 0-0)	Sweden	Helsinki Halli, Helsinki; Attendance: 12,443

Game reference

Harri Säteri
Goalies
Adam Reideborn
Referees:
(Czech Republic) Antonin Jerabek
(Czech Republic) Robin Sir

03:46 – Mikko Lehtonen (Henrik Haapala, Juuso Hietanen)	1-0
25:24 – Miro Aaltonen (Teemu Turunen, Henrik Haapala) (PP)	2-0
	2-1	31:53 – Olle Alsing (Simon Bertilsson, Fredrik Händemark)

6 min
Penalties
6 min
23
Shots
41

== Scoring leaders ==
Pos	Player	Country	GP	G	A	Pts	+/−	PIM	POS
1	Sakari Manninen	Finland	3	2	1	3	+2	0	F
2	Damir Zhafyarov	Russia	3	1	2	3	+2	2	F
3	Andrej Nestrašil	Czech Republic	3	1	2	3	+2	0	F
4	Anton Burdasov	Russia	3	0	3	3	-1	0	F
5	Ville Pokka	Finland	3	0	3	3	+2	0	D

GP = Games played; G = Goals; A = Assists; Pts = Points; +/− = Plus/minus; PIM = Penalties in minutes; POS = Position
Source: quanthockey

== Goaltending leaders ==
Pos	Player	Country	TOI	GA	GAA	Sv%	SO
1	Veini Vehviläinen	Finland	120:00	0	0.00	100.00	2
2	Igor Shesterkin	Russia	60:00	1	1.00	96.77	0
3	Ilya Sorokin	Russia	118:31	3	1.52	93.62	1
4	Lars Johansson	Sweden	117:01	5	2.56	90.57	0
5	Patrik Bartošák	Czech Republic	120:00	5	2.50	89.80	0

TOI = Time on ice (minutes:seconds); SA = Shots against; GA = Goals against; GAA = Goals Against Average; Sv% = Save percentage; SO = Shutouts
Source: swehockey
