= 2020 Sweden Hockey Games =

2020 Beijer Hockey Games (Euro Hockey Tour)
Tournament details
- Host countries: Sweden; Finland
- Cities: Stockholm; Helsinki
- Venues: 2 (in 2 host cities)
- Dates: 6–9 February 2020
- Teams: 4

Final positions
- Champions: Sweden (13th title)
- Runners-up: Czech Republic
- Third place: Finland
- Fourth place: Russia

Tournament statistics
- Games played: 6
- Goals scored: 31 (5.17 per game)
- Attendance: 49,089 (8,182 per game)
- Scoring leader: (Sweden) Mathias Bromé (5 points)

Official website
- swehockey

The 2020 Beijer Hockey Games was played between 6 and 9 February 2020. The Czech Republic, Finland, Sweden and Russia played a round-robin for a total of three games per team and six games in total, one game in was played in Helsinki, Finland and five games in Stockholm, Sweden. Sweden won the tournament. The tournament was part of 2019–20 Euro Hockey Tour.

== Standings ==
Pos	Team	Pld	W	OTW	OTL	L	GF	GA	GD	Pts
1	Sweden	3	3	0	0	0	12	4	+8	9
2	Czech Republic	3	1	1	0	1	8	6	+2	5
3	Finland	3	1	0	0	2	6	8	−2	3
4	Russia	3	0	0	1	2	5	12	−7	1

Source: swehockey

== Games ==
All times are local. Stockholm – (Central European Time – UTC+1) Helsinki – (Eastern European Time – UTC+2)

6 February 2020; 18:30	Finland	3-0 (3-0, 0-0, 0-0)	Russia	Helsinki Ice Hall, Helsinki; Attendance: 6,230

Game reference

Frans Tuohimaa
Goalies
~~Timur Bilyalov~~
Alexander Samonov
Referees:
(Czech Republic) Rene Hradil
(Czech Republic) Pavel Hodek
Linesmen:
(Finland) Lauri Nikulainen
(Finland) Hannu Sormunen

00:37 – Pulkkinen (Junttila)	1-0
05:43 – Nättinen (Koivisto)	2-0
06:54 – Junttila (Vittasmäki, Karjalainen)	>3-0

8 min
Penalties
8 min
25
Shots
18

6 February 2020; 19:00	Czech Republic	1-2 (1-0, 0-1, 0-1)	Sweden	Ericsson Globe, Stockholm; Attendance: 9,613

Game reference

Roman Will
Goalies
Magnus Hellberg
Referees:
(Finland) Joonas Kova
(Finland) Aaro Brännare
Linesmen:
(Sweden) Tobias Nordlander
(Sweden) Anders Nyqvist

09:03 – Stastny (Flek, Musil)	1-0
	1-1	31:34 – Händemark (Sellgren, Bromé)
	1-2	55:10 – Bromé (Strömwall, Lindberg)

12 min
Penalties
4 min
25
Shots
25

8 February 2020; 12:30	Finland	1-3 (1-1, 0-1, 0-1)	Czech Republic	Ericsson Globe, Stockholm; Attendance: 3,769

Game reference

Lassi Lehtinen
Goalies
Dominik Furch
Referees:
(Sweden) Linus Öhlund
(Sweden) Tobias Björk
Linesmen:
(Sweden) Daniel Persson
(Sweden) Gustav Jonsson

	0-1	03:53 – Horak
10:00 – Karjalainen (Junttila, Salo)	1-1
	1-2	39:54 – T.Zohorna (H.Zohorna, R.Zohorna)
	1-3	58:54 – H. Zohorna (T.Zohorna)

6 min
Penalties
8 min
22
Shots
21

8 February 2020; 16:15	Sweden	5-2 (1-0, 2-0, 2-2)	Russia	Ericsson Globe, Stockholm; Attendance: 13,850

Game reference

Lars Johansson
Goalies
Alexander Samonov
Referees:
(Finland) Joonas Kova
(Finland) Aaro Brännare
Linesmen:
(Russia) Emil Yletyinen
(Sweden) Ludvig Lundgren

00:46 – Nilsson (Dahlbeck, Händemark)	1-0
30:46 – Fagemo (Lundkvist, Everberg)	2-0
34:45 – Sylvegård (Bromé, Dahlbeck)	3-0
	3-1	47:04 – Poryadin (Galimov)
48:08 – Bengtsson (Marcus Nilsson)	4-1
50:59 – Bengtsson (Nilsson, Lindberg)	5-1
	5-2	53:33 – Kudryavtsev (Zernov, Golyshev)

8 min
Penalties
10 min
23
Shots
18

9 February 2020; 12:15	Russia	3-4 GWS (1-1, 1-0, 1-2) (OT: 0–0) (SO: 0–1)	Czech Republic	Ericsson Globe, Stockholm; Attendance: 3,461

Game reference

Igor Bobkov
Goalies
Dominik Furch
Referees:
(Sweden) Linus Öhlund
(Sweden) Tobias Björk
Linesmen:
(Russia) Emil Yletyinen
(Sweden) Ludvig Lundgren

11:24 – Kayumov (Zernov, Golyshev)	1-0
	1-1	19:14 – Flek (Hyka, Sulak)
36:01 – Svetlakov (Mamin)	2-1
	2-2	53:43 – Kostalek (Krejcik, Hyka)
57:04 – Poryadin (Mironov)	3-2
	3-3	59:59 – Kostalek (Jerabek, Horak)

A.Golyshev (miss)
P.Kudryavtsev (miss)
P.Poryadin (miss)
Shootout
T.Hyka (miss)
J.Krejcik
J.Kovar
J.Flek
22 min
Penalties
12 min
27
Shots
28

9 February 2020; 15:45	Sweden	5-1 (3-1, 1-0, 1-0)	Finland	Ericsson Globe, Stockholm; Attendance: 12,166

Game reference

Magnus Hellberg
Goalies
Frans Tuohimaa
Referees:
(Russia) Evgeny Romasko
(Russia) Iurii Oskirko
Linesmen:
(Sweden) Andreas Malmqvist
(Sweden) Ludvig Lundgren

02:24 – Johansson (Tömmernes, Bromé)	1-0
08:37 – Fagemo (Bengtsson, Nilsson)	2-0
15:43 – Zaar (Pudas, Strandberg)	3-0
	3-1	19:52:XX – Mustonen (Koivisto, Melart)
36:14 – Everberg (Fagemo, Händemark)	4-1
58:48 – Johansson (Pudas, Bromé)	5-1

8 min
Penalties
2 min
20
Shots
28

== Scoring leaders ==
Pos	Player	Country	GP	G	A	Pts	+/−	PIM	POS
1	Mathias Bromé	Sweden	3	1	4	5	+5	0	LW
2	Marcus Nilsson	Sweden	3	1	3	4	+2	0	RW
3	Samuel Fagemo	Sweden	3	2	1	3	+1	0	RW
4	Lukas Bengtsson	Sweden	3	2	1	3	+1	0	LD
5	Fredrik Händemark	Sweden	3	1	2	3	+3	0	CE

GP = Games played; G = Goals; A = Assists; Pts = Points; +/− = Plus/minus; PIM = Penalties in minutes; POS = Position
Source: swehockey

== Goaltending leaders ==
Pos	Player	Country	TOI	GA	GAA	Sv%	SO
1	Magnus Hellberg	Sweden	120:00	2	1.00	96.23	0
2	Dominik Furch	Czech Republic	122:44	4	1.96	91.84	0
3	Frans Tuohimaa	Finland	117:40	4	2.04	89.19	1
4	Alexander Samonov	Russia	124:46	5	2.65	88.64	0

TOI = Time on ice (minutes:seconds); SA = Shots against; GA = Goals against; GAA = Goals Against Average; Sv% = Save percentage; SO = Shutouts
Source: swehockey
