= 2019–20 Euro Hockey Tour =

Tournament details
- Venues: 7 (in 7 host cities)
- Dates: 7 November 2019 – 9 February 2020
- Teams: 4

Final positions
- Champions: Czech Republic (3rd title)
- Runners-up: Sweden
- Third place: Finland
- Fourth place: Russia

Tournament statistics
- Games played: 18
- Goals scored: 94 (5.22 per game)
- Attendance: 205,819 (11,434 per game)
- Scoring leader: (Sweden) Fredrik Händemark (6 points)

The 2019–20 Euro Hockey Tour was the 24th season of Euro Hockey Tour. It started in November 2019 and lasted until February 2020. It consisted of Karjala Tournament, Channel One Cup and Beijer Hockey Games. The 2020 Carlson Hockey Games were supposed to be part of the tour but were cancelled due to the COVID-19 pandemic. According to the source there is no official winner for the 2019-2020 EHT season

== Standings ==
Pos	Team	Pld	W	OTW	OTL	L	GF	GA	GD	Pts
1	Czech Republic	9	3	3	1	2	25	19	+6	16
2	Sweden	9	5	0	1	3	26	23	+3	16
3	Finland	9	4	0	2	3	21	22	−1	14
4	Russia	9	1	2	1	5	22	30	−8	8

Source: Euro Hockey Tour

== Karjala Tournament ==
The Karjala Cup was played between 7–10 November 2019. Five of the matches were played in Helsinki, Finland and one match in Leksand, Sweden. The tournament was won by Czech Republic.

Pos	Team	Pld	W	OTW	OTL	L	GF	GA	GD	Pts
1	Czech Republic	3	2	1	0	0	9	3	+6	8
2	Finland	3	2	0	1	0	8	7	+1	7
3	Russia	3	0	1	0	2	8	11	−3	2
4	Sweden	3	0	0	1	2	6	10	−4	1

Source: Swehockey

7 November 2019
Russia	3–4	Finland
Czech Republic	3–1	Sweden
9 November 2019
Sweden	4–5 (GWS)	Russia
Finland	2–3 (GWS)	Czech Republic
10 November 2019
Czech Republic	3–0	Russia
Finland	2–1	Sweden

== Channel One Cup ==
The 2019 Channel One Cup was played between 12–15 December 2018. Four matches were played in Moscow, Russia, one match was held in Plzeň, Czech Republic and one match as an outdoor game in Saint Petersburg, Russia. The tournament was won by Sweden.

Pos	Team	Pld	W	OTW	OTL	L	GF	GA	GD	Pts
1	Sweden	3	2	0	0	1	8	9	−1	6
2	Russia	3	1	1	0	1	9	7	+2	5
3	Finland	3	1	0	1	1	8	7	+1	4
4	Czech Republic	3	0	1	1	1	8	10	−2	3

Source: Swehockey

12 December 2019
Czech Republic	4–3 (OT)	Finland
Russia	3–4	Sweden
14 December 2019
Finland	5–1	Sweden
Russia	4–3 (GWS)	Czech Republic
15 December 2019
Sweden	3–1	Czech Republic
Russia	2–0	Finland

== Beijer Hockey Games ==
The 2020 Beijer Hockey Games were played between 6–9 February 2020. Five matches were played in Stockholm, Sweden and one match in Helsinki, Finland. The tournament was won by Sweden.

Pos	Team	Pld	W	OTW	OTL	L	GF	GA	GD	Pts
1	Sweden	3	3	0	0	0	12	4	+8	9
2	Czech Republic	3	1	1	0	1	8	6	+2	5
3	Finland	3	1	0	0	2	5	8	−3	3
4	Russia	3	0	0	1	2	5	12	−7	1

Source: Swehockey

6 February 2020
Finland	3–0	Russia
Czech Republic	1–2	Sweden
8 February 2020
Finland	1–3	Czech Republic
Sweden	5–2	Russia
9 February 2020
Russia	3–4 (GWS)	Czech Republic
Sweden	5–1	Finland
