= 2020–21 Euro Hockey Tour =

Tournament details
- Venues: 4 (in 4 host cities)
- Dates: 5 November 2020 – 16 May 2021
- Teams: 4

Final positions
- Champions: Russia (9th title)
- Runners-up: Czech Republic
- Third place: Sweden
- Fourth place: Finland

Tournament statistics
- Games played: 24
- Goals scored: 124 (5.17 per game)
- Attendance: 10,850 (452 per game)
- Scoring leader: (Russia) Vasily Podkolzin (9 points)

The 2020–21 Euro Hockey Tour was the 25th season of Euro Hockey Tour. It started in November 2020 and lasted until May 2021. It consisted of Karjala Tournament, Channel One Cup, Beijer Hockey Games and Carlson Hockey Games.

== Standings ==
Pos	Team	Pld	W	OTW	OTL	L	GF	GA	GD	Pts
1	Russia	12	7	3	0	2	43	27	+16	27
2	Czech Republic	12	5	1	2	4	30	29	+1	19
3	Sweden	12	3	1	4	4	28	32	−4	15
4	Finland	12	3	1	0	8	23	36	−13	11

Source: Euro Hockey Tour

== Karjala Tournament ==
The Karjala Cup was played between 5–8 November 2020. All six matches were played in Helsinki, Finland. The tournament was won by Russia.

Pos	Team	Pld	W	OTW	OTL	L	GF	GA	GD	Pts
1	Russia	3	2	1	0	0	11	3	+8	8
2	Czech Republic	3	2	0	0	1	5	4	+1	6
3	Finland	3	1	0	0	2	5	10	−5	3
4	Sweden	3	0	0	1	2	4	8	−4	1

Source: Swehockey

5 November 2020
Czech Republic	3–1	Sweden
Russia	6–2	Finland
7 November 2020
Sweden	1–2 (GWS)	Russia
Finland	0–2	Czech Republic
8 November 2020
Czech Republic	0–3	Russia
Finland	3–2	Sweden

== Channel One Cup ==
The 2020 Channel One Cup was played between 17–20 December 2020. All six matches were played in Moscow, Russia. The tournament was won by Russia.

Pos	Team	Pld	W	OTW	OTL	L	GF	GA	GD	Pts
1	Russia	3	2	1	0	0	13	5	+8	8
2	Sweden	3	1	0	1	1	8	9	−1	4
3	Finland	3	1	0	0	2	6	12	−6	3
4	Czech Republic	3	1	0	0	2	8	9	−1	3

Source: Leijonat.com

17 December 2020
Finland	4–3	Czech Republic
Sweden	3–4 (GWS)	Russia
19 December 2020
Finland	1–4	Sweden
Russia	4–1	Czech Republic
20 December 2020
Czech Republic	4–1	Sweden
Russia	5–1	Finland

== Beijer Hockey Games ==
The 2021 Beijer Hockey Games were played between 11–14 February 2021. All six matches will be played in Malmö, Sweden. The tournament was won by Russia.

Pos	Team	Pld	W	OTW	OTL	L	GF	GA	GD	Pts
1	Russia	3	2	1	0	0	12	7	+5	8
2	Sweden	3	1	1	1	0	7	4	+3	6
3	Finland	3	0	1	0	2	5	8	−3	2
4	Czech Republic	3	0	0	2	1	8	13	−5	2

Source: Stats.swehockey.se

11 February 2021
Russia	3–2	Finland
Czech Republic	2–3 (OT)	Sweden
13 February 2021
Finland	3–2 (GWS)	Czech Republic
Sweden	1–2 (GWS)	Russia
14 February 2021
Russia	7–4	Czech Republic
Sweden	3–0	Finland

== Carlson Hockey Games ==
The 2021 Carlson Hockey Games were played between 12 May–15 May 2021. All six matches were played in Prague, Czech Republic. The tournament was won by Czech Republic.

Pos	Team	Pld	W	OTW	OTL	L	GF	GA	GD	Pts
1	Czech Republic	3	2	1	0	0	9	3	+6	8
2	Sweden	3	1	0	1	1	9	11	−2	4
3	Finland	3	1	0	0	2	7	6	+1	3
4	Russia	3	1	0	0	2	7	12	−5	3

Source: Leijonat.com

12 May 2021
Sweden	4–6	Russia
Finland	1–2	Czech Republic
13 May 2021
Czech Republic	3–2 (OT)	Sweden
Russia	1–4	Finland
15 May 2021
Sweden	3–2	Finland
Czech Republic	4–0	Russia
