= Daniil Misyul =

Russian ice hockey player

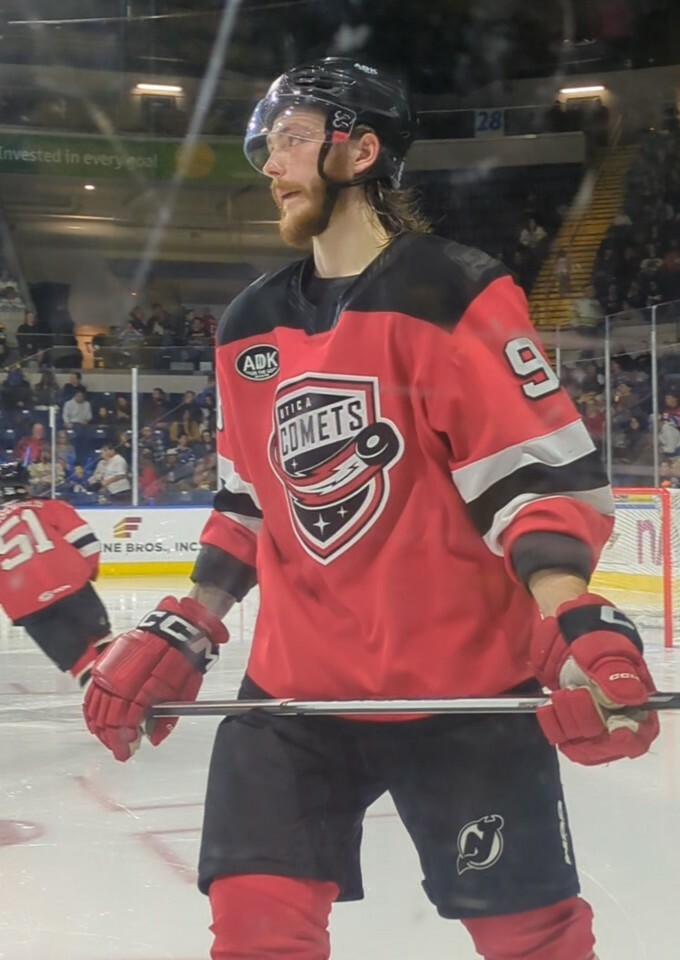
- Misyul with the Utica Comets in 2023
- Born: October 20, 2000 (age 25) Minsk, Belarus
- Height: 6 ft 3 in (191 cm)
- Weight: 187 lb (85 kg; 13 st 5 lb)
- Position: Defence
- Shoots: Left
- KHL team Former teams: Lokomotiv Yaroslavl; New Jersey Devils
- NHL draft: 70th overall, 2019; New Jersey Devils
- Playing career: 2018–present

Daniil Dmitrievich Misyul (Russian: Даниил Дмитриевич Мисюль; born October 20, 2000) is a Belarusian-born Russian professional ice hockey defenceman for Lokomotiv Yaroslavl of the Kontinental Hockey League (KHL). He was drafted 70th overall in the third round of the 2019 NHL entry draft by the New Jersey Devils.

== Playing career ==
Misyul made his Kontinental Hockey League (KHL) debut for Lokomotiv Yaroslavl during the 2018–19 KHL season, playing three games. He was drafted 70th overall by the New Jersey Devils in the 2019 NHL entry draft.

Following the 2022–23 season, his fifth with Lokomotiv, Misyul was signed to a two-year, entry-level contract with the New Jersey Devils on May 4, 2023.

Misyul was assigned to the Devils' American Hockey League (AHL) affiliate, the Utica Comets, to start the 2023–24 season. He recorded his first AHL point, an assist, on October 28, 2023, against the Rochester Americans. He scored his first AHL goal on November 10, in a 4–3 loss to the Americans. He was recalled to the NHL for the first time on January 25, 2024.

In the 2024–25 season, Misyul made his NHL debut for the Devils on October 22, 2024, against the Tampa Bay Lightning, two days after his 24th birthday. He was reassigned to the Comets after his lone appearance with the Devils and registered 8 assists through 47 games. On March 7, 2025, Misyul was traded by the Devils to the Boston Bruins in exchange for Marc McLaughlin.

As a pending restricted free agent from the Bruins after his contract expired, Misyul opted to return to his native Russia, reuniting with his original club, Lokomotiv Yaroslavl of the KHL, on a one-year contract on 24 June 2025.

== International play ==
Medal record

Representing Russia

Men's ice hockey

World Junior Championships
Silver medal – second place	2020 Czech Republic	

Misyul represented Russia at the 2018 IIHF World U18 Championships and the 2020 World Junior Ice Hockey Championships.

== Career statistics ==
=== Regular season and playoffs ===
			Regular season					Playoffs
Season	Team	League	GP	G	A	Pts	PIM	GP	G	A	Pts	PIM
2016–17	Loko-Junior Yaroslavl	NMHL	25	2	5	7	63	2	0	0	0	0
2017–18	Loko Yaroslavl	MHL	33	2	3	5	26	6	0	1	1	6
2018–19	Loko Yaroslavl	MHL	46	4	6	10	71	10	0	0	0	6
2018–19	Lokomotiv Yaroslavl	KHL	3	0	1	1	0	6	1	0	1	13
2019–20	Lokomotiv Yaroslavl	KHL	35	2	1	3	11	—	—	—	—	—
2020–21	Lokomotiv Yaroslavl	KHL	46	2	5	7	12	4	0	0	0	10
2020–21	Loko Yaroslavl	MHL	1	0	0	0	2	9	0	1	1	14
2021–22	Lokomotiv Yaroslavl	KHL	41	1	2	3	16	3	0	0	0	2
2022–23	Lokomotiv Yaroslavl	KHL	59	0	7	7	30	8	0	1	1	2
2023–24	Utica Comets	AHL	44	4	10	14	47	—	—	—	—	—
2024–25	Utica Comets	AHL	47	0	8	8	33	—	—	—	—	—
2024–25	New Jersey Devils	NHL	1	0	0	0	0	—	—	—	—	—
2024–25	Providence Bruins	AHL	11	1	0	1	27	5	0	1	1	4
2025–26	Lokomotiv Yaroslavl	KHL	60	4	8	12	31	20	0	2	2	2
KHL totals			244	9	24	33	100	41	1	3	4	29
NHL totals			1	0	0	0	0	—	—	—	—	—

=== International ===
Year	Team	Event	Result	GP	G	A	Pts	PIM
2016	Russia	U17	3rd place, bronze medalist(s)	6	0	0	0	4
2018	Russia	U18	6th	5	1	0	1	4
2020	Russia	WJC	2nd place, silver medalist(s)	6	0	0	0	12
Junior totals				17	1	0	1	20

== Awards and honours ==
Award	Year	Ref
MHL
Kharlamov Cup champion	2018	
All-Star Game	2019	
KHL
Gagarin Cup champion	2026	
