= Radan Lenc =

Czech ice hockey player

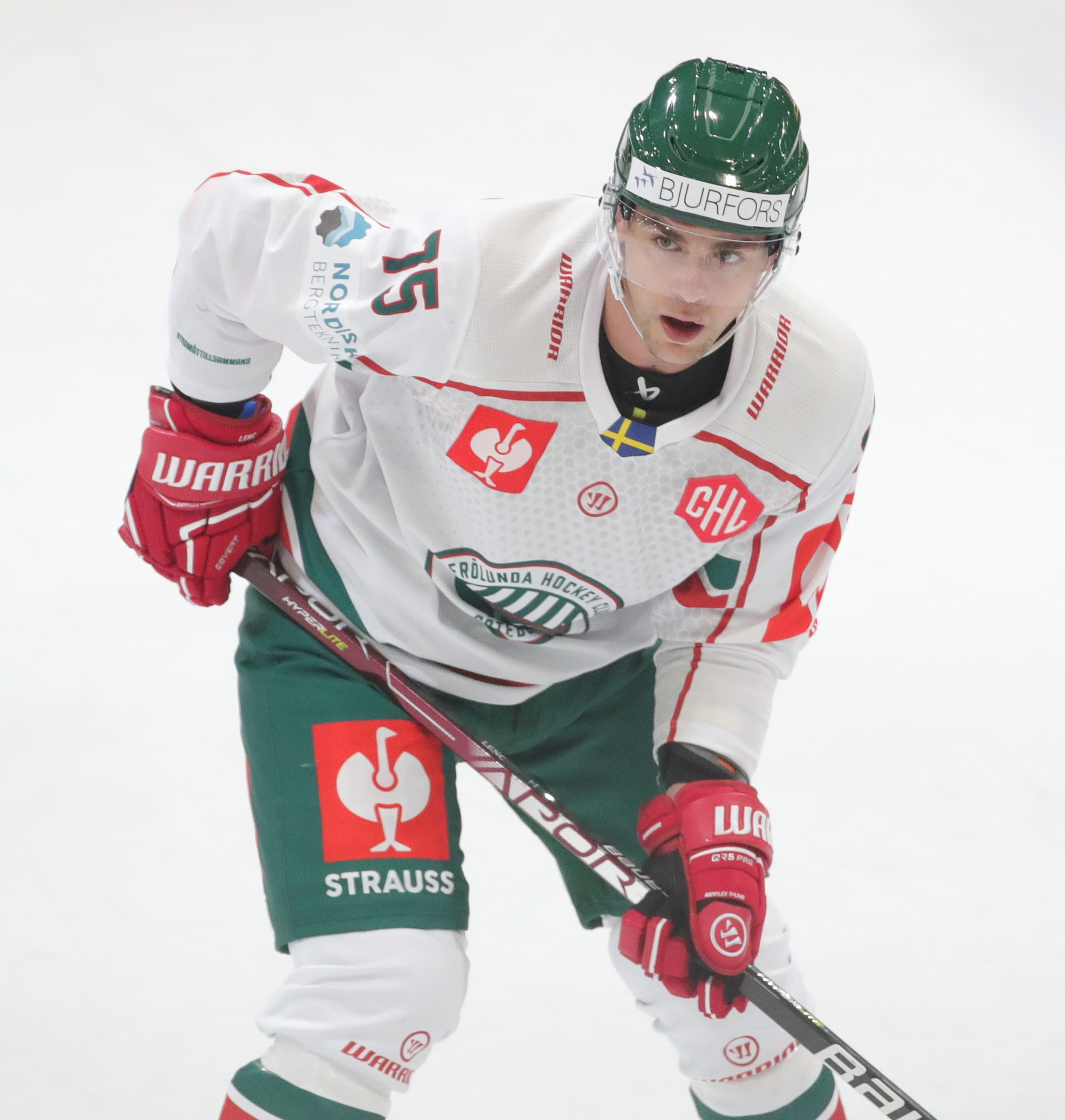
- Lenc in 2022
- Born: July 30, 1991 (age 33); Mladá Boleslav, Czechoslovakia
- Height: 6 ft 0 in (183 cm)
- Weight: 180 lb (82 kg; 12 st 12 lb)
- Position: Forward
- Shoots: Left
- ELH team Former teams: HC Bílí Tygři Liberec; BK Mladá Boleslav; Amur Khabarovsk; Frölunda HC; HV71
- National team: Czech Republic
- Playing career: 2010–present

Radan Lenc (born July 30, 1991) is a Czech professional ice hockey player. He currently plays for HC Bílí Tygři Liberec in the Czech Extraliga (ELH).

During his second season in the SHL with Frölunda HC in the 2022–23 campaign, Lenc registered 2 goals and 5 points through 16 regular season games before leaving the club to join fellow SHL outfit, HV71, on a two-year contract on 2 November 2022.

== Career statistics ==
=== Regular season and playoffs ===
			Regular season					Playoffs
Season	Team	League	GP	G	A	Pts	PIM	GP	G	A	Pts	PIM
2007–08	BK Mladá Boleslav	CZE U18	46	20	13	33	64	3	0	1	1	2
2008–09	BK Mladá Boleslav	CZE U20	26	5	2	7	10	1	0	0	0	0
2008–09	NED Hockey Nymburk	CZE.2 U20	16	10	8	18	—	—	—	—	—	—
2009–10	BK Mladá Boleslav	CZE U20	50	12	17	29	60	3	0	1	1	0
2010–11	BK Mladá Boleslav	CZE U20	48	39	26	65	54	—	—	—	—	—
2010–11	BK Mladá Boleslav	ELH	1	0	0	0	0	—	—	—	—	—
2011–12	BK Mladá Boleslav	CZE U20	15	4	8	12	22	—	—	—	—	—
2011–12	BK Mladá Boleslav	ELH	12	0	0	0	2	—	—	—	—	—
2011–12	HC Stadion Litoměřice	CZE.2	26	7	7	14	18	—	—	—	—	—
2012–13	BK Mladá Boleslav	CZE U20	1	0	0	0	0	—	—	—	—	—
2012–13	BK Mladá Boleslav	CZE.2	28	3	3	6	22	—	—	—	—	—
2012–13	HC Medvědi Beroun 1933	CZE U20	17	6	6	12	20	—	—	—	—	—
2012–13	NED Hockey Nymburk	CZE.3	2	2	0	2	0	—	—	—	—	—
2013–14	HC ČSOB Pojišťovna Pardubice	ELH	1	0	0	0	0	—	—	—	—	—
2013–14	BK Mladá Boleslav	CZE.2	51	16	16	32	74	8	1	1	2	31
2014–15	BK Mladá Boleslav	ELH	52	9	11	20	42	9	1	1	2	2
2014–15	HC Dukla Jihlava	CZE.2	1	1	1	2	2	—	—	—	—	—
2015–16	BK Mladá Boleslav	ELH	47	16	12	28	28	10	2	4	6	40
2016–17	BK Mladá Boleslav	ELH	51	16	14	30	50	5	1	0	1	0
2017–18	BK Mladá Boleslav	ELH	52	10	10	20	32	—	—	—	—	—
2018–19	Bílí Tygři Liberec	ELH	52	16	17	33	30	17	3	2	5	2
2019–20	Bílí Tygři Liberec	ELH	49	21	18	39	14	—	—	—	—	—
2020–21	Bílí Tygři Liberec	ELH	51	19	22	41	30	16	2	12	14	4
2021–22	Amur Khabarovsk	KHL	49	8	9	17	20	—	—	—	—	—
2021–22	Frölunda HC	SHL	14	6	4	10	6	9	2	5	7	2
2022–23	Frölunda HC	SHL	16	2	3	5	4	—	—	—	—	—
2022–23	HV71	SHL	37	10	9	19	8	—	—	—	—	—
2023–24	HV71	SHL	52	14	11	25	21	—	—	—	—	—
2024–25	HV71	SHL	51	11	10	21	24	—	—	—	—	—
ELH totals			368	107	104	211	228	57	9	19	28	48

=== International ===
Year	Team	Event	Result	GP	G	A	Pts	PIM
2021	Czech Republic	WC	7th	6	1	0	1	4
2022	Czech Republic	OG	9th	4	0	0	0	0
2023	Czech Republic	WC	8th	4	0	0	0	4
Senior totals				14	1	0	1	8
