= Emil Pettersson =

Swedish ice hockey player (born 1994)

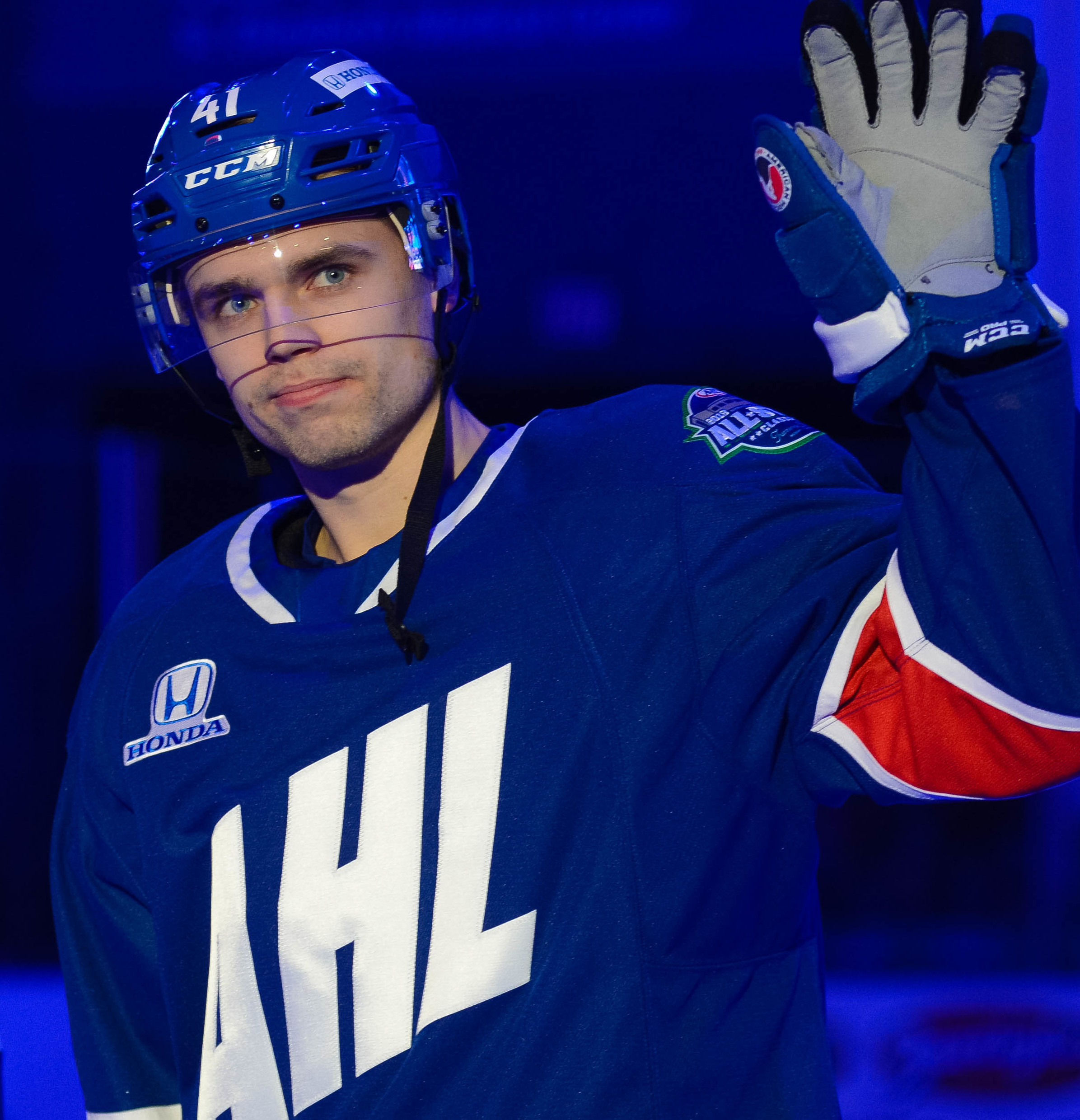
- Pettersson at the 2018 AHL All-Star Game
- Born: 14 January 1994 (age 32) Sundsvall, Sweden
- Height: 188 cm (6 ft 2 in)
- Weight: 80 kg (176 lb; 12 st 8 lb)
- Position: Centre
- Shoots: Left
- SHL team Former teams: Timrå IK; Modo Hockey; Skellefteå AIK; Växjö Lakers; Spartak Moscow
- NHL draft: 155th overall, 2013; Nashville Predators
- Playing career: 2013–present

Emil Pettersson (born 14 January 1994) is a Swedish professional ice hockey player for Timrå IK of the Swedish Hockey League (SHL). Pettersson was selected by the Nashville Predators in the sixth round (155th overall) of the 2013 NHL entry draft. Emil's brother Elias was drafted fifth overall by the Vancouver Canucks in the 2017 NHL entry draft.

== Playing career ==
Pettersson made his Elitserien (now the SHL) debut playing with Timrå IK during the 2012–13 Elitserien season.

In the 2016–17 season, having signed with Skellefteå AIK, Pettersson played in 24 games before he was transferred mid-season to join his fourth SHL club in the Växjö Lakers, on 7 December 2016. Pettersson quickly adapted with the Lakers, completing the season with 26 points in 27 games.

On 9 May 2017, Pettersson agreed to a two-year, entry-level contract with the Nashville Predators. He joined the Predators American Hockey League affiliate, the Milwaukee Admirals for the 2017–18 season. During the season, Pettersson and teammate Anders Lindbäck were named to the 2018 AHL All-Star Classic. In playing the full year with the Admirals, Pettersson led the team in scoring with 33 assists and 46 points in 72 regular season games.

In the following 2018–19 season, Pettersson continued to lead the Admirals offence, compiling 33 points in 49 games before he was traded by the Predators to the Arizona Coyotes in exchange for Laurent Dauphin and Adam Helewka on 8 February 2019. He was immediately assigned to continue in the AHL with Coyotes affiliate, the Tucson Roadrunners.

Having completed his contract in North America, and playing exclusively in the AHL, Pettersson left as an impending restricted free agent from the Coyotes. On 13 June 2019, he agreed to a two-year contract to return to Sweden with former club, the Växjö Lakers of the SHL.

In helping the Lakers claim the Le Mat Trophy in his final season under contract in 2020–21, Pettersson embarked on a new challenge in securing a one-year contract with Russian-based, HC Spartak Moscow of the Kontinental Hockey League (KHL), on 13 July 2021. In his lone season with Spartak, Pettersson contributed with 13 goals and 24 points through 42 regular season games. In helping Spartak qualify for the post-season, he collected an assist in 5 playoff appearances.

As a free agent, Pettersson opted to return to the SHL and sign a five-year contract with original club, Timrå IK, on 8 April 2022.

== Personal life ==
Pettersson is of Finnish descent through his paternal grandfather, born Toivo Jokelainen, who was sent to Sweden in 1941 as a Finnish war child.

== Career statistics ==
			Regular season					Playoffs
Season	Team	League	GP	G	A	Pts	PIM	GP	G	A	Pts	PIM
2011–12	Timrå IK	J20	17	4	2	6	10	3	1	1	2	2
2012–13	Timrå IK	J20	44	13	31	44	38	2	0	0	0	2
2012–13	Timrå IK	SEL	2	0	0	0	0	—	—	—	—	—
2013–14	Timrå IK	J20	12	10	9	19	12	2	2	0	2	4
2013–14	Timrå IK	Allsv	44	6	8	14	12	—	—	—	—	—
2014–15	Timrå IK	Allsv	52	12	23	35	16	—	—	—	—	—
2014–15	Modo Hockey	SHL	2	1	0	1	2	—	—	—	—	—
2015–16	Modo Hockey	SHL	52	12	14	26	8	—	—	—	—	—
2016–17	Skellefteå AIK	SHL	24	6	6	12	4	—	—	—	—	—
2016–17	Växjö Lakers	SHL	27	9	17	26	8	6	4	3	7	4
2017–18	Milwaukee Admirals	AHL	72	13	33	46	32	—	—	—	—	—
2018–19	Milwaukee Admirals	AHL	49	11	22	33	24	—	—	—	—	—
2018–19	Tucson Roadrunners	AHL	12	0	5	5	4	—	—	—	—	—
2019–20	Växjö Lakers	SHL	52	10	15	25	28	—	—	—	—	—
2020–21	Växjö Lakers	SHL	52	22	26	48	20	14	2	5	7	6
2021–22	Spartak Moscow	KHL	42	13	11	24	16	5	0	1	1	4
2022–23	Timrå IK	SHL	51	13	18	31	16	7	3	5	8	4
2023–24	Timrå IK	SHL	51	11	19	30	12	2	0	0	0	0
2024–25	Timrå IK	SHL	52	11	23	34	26	6	2	1	3	0
SHL totals			365	95	138	233	144	35	11	14	25	14

== Awards and honours ==
Award	Year
AHL
All-Star Game	2018
SHL
Le Mat Trophy (Växjö Lakers)	2021
