= Jonatan Berggren =

Swedish ice hockey player (born 2000)

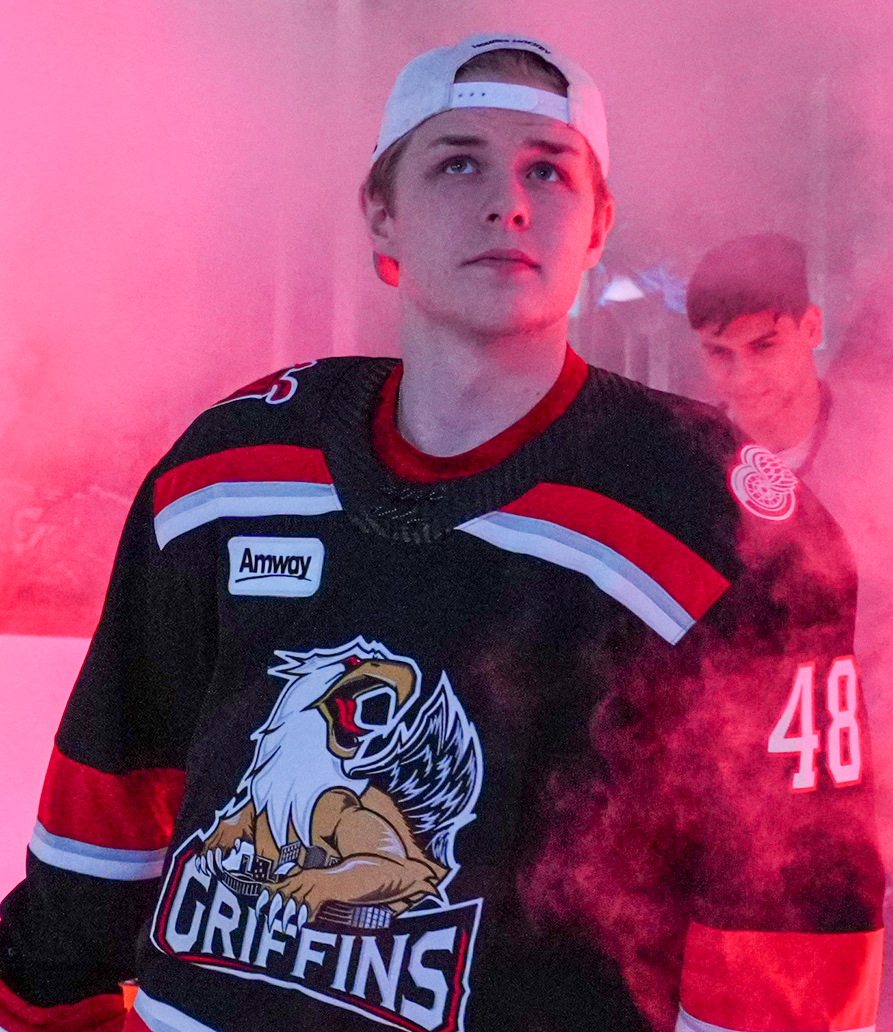
- Born: 16 July 2000 (age 26) Uppsala, Sweden
- Height: 5 ft 11 in (180 cm)
- Weight: 183 lb (83 kg; 13 st 1 lb)
- Position: Forward
- Shoots: Left
- NHL team Former teams: St. Louis Blues; Skellefteå AIK; Detroit Red Wings
- National team: Sweden
- NHL draft: 33rd overall, 2018; Detroit Red Wings
- Playing career: 2018–present

Jonatan Berggren (born 16 July 2000) is a Swedish professional ice hockey player who is a forward for the St. Louis Blues of the National Hockey League (NHL). Berggren was drafted in the second round, 33rd overall, by the Detroit Red Wings in the 2018 NHL entry draft.

== Playing career ==
=== Sweden ===
Berggren made his Swedish Hockey League debut playing with Skellefteå AIK during the 2017–18 SHL season. Berggren was sidelined for most of the 2018–19 season with a back injury.

In his fourth season with Skellefteå AIK, Berggren broke out offensively in the 2020–21 campaign, finishing sixth in SHL scoring with 45 points in 49 games and co-leading Skellefteå AIK. Berggren became only the 13th player in SHL history to compile over 40 points in a season at age 20 or younger, and the first since Elias Pettersson in 2018.

=== Detroit Red Wings ===
On 20 May 2021, Berggren signed a three-year entry-level contract with the Detroit Red Wings to start his National Hockey League career. After participating in the Red Wings training camp ahead of the 2021–22 season, Berggren was assigned to their American Hockey League (AHL) affiliate, the Grand Rapids Griffins, to start the season. While with the Griffins for the entirety of the season, Berggren set a new franchise record for most points recorded by a rookie in his first season. He originally set the record on 24 April 2022, with an assist in a game against the Chicago Wolves. Berggren was later recognized as the AHL's Rookie of the Month for April after totalling six goals and 14 assists through 14 games. Berggren finished the season setting franchise rookie records with 43 assists, 64 points, seven game-winning goals, and three overtime goals. In spite of his personal achievements, the Griffins failed to qualify for the Calder Cup playoffs for the first time in seven years.

Berggren participated in the Red Wings training camp ahead of the 2022–23 season but was reassigned to the Griffins on 9 October. He recorded four goals and three assists for seven points through seven games before being recalled to the NHL level on 10 November. Berggren made his NHL debut the following night against the New York Rangers, where he recorded his first NHL assist. After recording another positive effort in the next game against the Los Angeles Kings, Berggren was promoted to the Red Wings first line. Once Tyler Bertuzzi returned from injury, Berggren was bumped down to the third line with Joe Veleno and David Perron. On 15 November, Berggren recorded his first career NHL goal against the Anaheim Ducks. Through his first 23 NHL games, Berggren quickly tallied five goals and eight assists for 13 points. Berggen finished the season in the top 10 among NHL rookies in goals with 15 while ranked 14th with 28 points. He also recorded the highest shooting percentage of any Red Wings rookie since Henrik Zetterberg in the 2002–03 season. Berggen was subsequently named the 2023 Detroit Red Wings Rookie of the Year by the Detroit Sports Media Association.

Following his rookie season, Berggen changed his jersey number from 52 to 48. While he was reassigned to the AHL to start the 2023–24 season, Berggen was called up under emergency conditions on 20 October. At the time of the recall, he had accumulated three assists through two games.

On 16 September 2024, Berggren signed a one-year, $825,000 contract with the Red Wings.

=== St. Louis Blues ===
After struggling through the start of the 2025–26 season, Berggren was waived by the Red Wings on 16 December 2025; he was subsequently claimed by the St. Louis Blues the following day. Berggren finished the season with 16 points in 36 games for the Blues. As a restricted free agent, he signed a one-year contract extension worth $2 million on July 1, 2026.

== International play ==
Medal record

Representing Sweden

Ice hockey

World Junior Championships
Bronze medal – third place	2020 Czech Republic	

IIHF World U18 Championship
Bronze medal – third place	2018 Russia	

Berggren represented Sweden at the 2018 IIHF World U18 Championships where he recorded five goals and five assists in seven games and won a bronze medal.

He represented Sweden at the 2020 World Junior Ice Hockey Championships where he recorded one goal and four assists in seven games and won a bronze medal.

== Career statistics ==
=== Regular season and playoffs ===
			Regular season					Playoffs
Season	Team	League	GP	G	A	Pts	PIM	GP	G	A	Pts	PIM
2016–17	Skellefteå AIK	J20	29	6	6	12	8	—	—	—	—	—
2017–18	Skellefteå AIK	J20	38	18	39	57	34	3	1	4	5	4
2017–18	Skellefteå AIK	SHL	10	0	0	0	0	2	0	1	1	2
2018–19	Skellefteå AIK	SHL	16	0	3	3	4	—	—	—	—	—
2019–20	Skellefteå AIK	SHL	24	2	10	12	6	—	—	—	—	—
2020–21	Skellefteå AIK	SHL	49	12	33	45	18	12	0	4	4	2
2021–22	Grand Rapids Griffins	AHL	70	21	43	64	24	—	—	—	—	—
2022–23	Grand Rapids Griffins	AHL	7	4	3	7	2	—	—	—	—	—
2022–23	Detroit Red Wings	NHL	67	15	13	28	16	—	—	—	—	—
2023–24	Grand Rapids Griffins	AHL	53	24	32	56	58	9	5	5	10	6
2023–24	Detroit Red Wings	NHL	12	2	4	6	2	—	—	—	—	—
2024–25	Detroit Red Wings	NHL	75	12	12	24	14	—	—	—	—	—
2025–26	Detroit Red Wings	NHL	15	2	4	6	6	—	—	—	—	—
2025–26	St. Louis Blues	NHL	36	6	10	16	6	—	—	—	—	—
SHL totals			99	14	46	60	28	14	0	5	5	4
NHL totals			205	37	43	80	44	—	—	—	—	—

=== International ===
Year	Team	Event	Result	GP	G	A	Pts	PIM
2016	Sweden	U17	1st place, gold medalist(s)	6	2	1	3	4
2017	Sweden	IH18	3rd place, bronze medalist(s)	5	3	2	5	2
2018	Sweden	U18	3rd place, bronze medalist(s)	7	5	5	10	2
2020	Sweden	WJC	3rd place, bronze medalist(s)	7	1	4	5	2
2023	Sweden	WC	6th	8	2	5	7	2
Junior totals				25	11	12	23	10
Senior totals				8	2	5	7	2
