= Anton Burdasov =

Russian ice hockey player (born 1991)

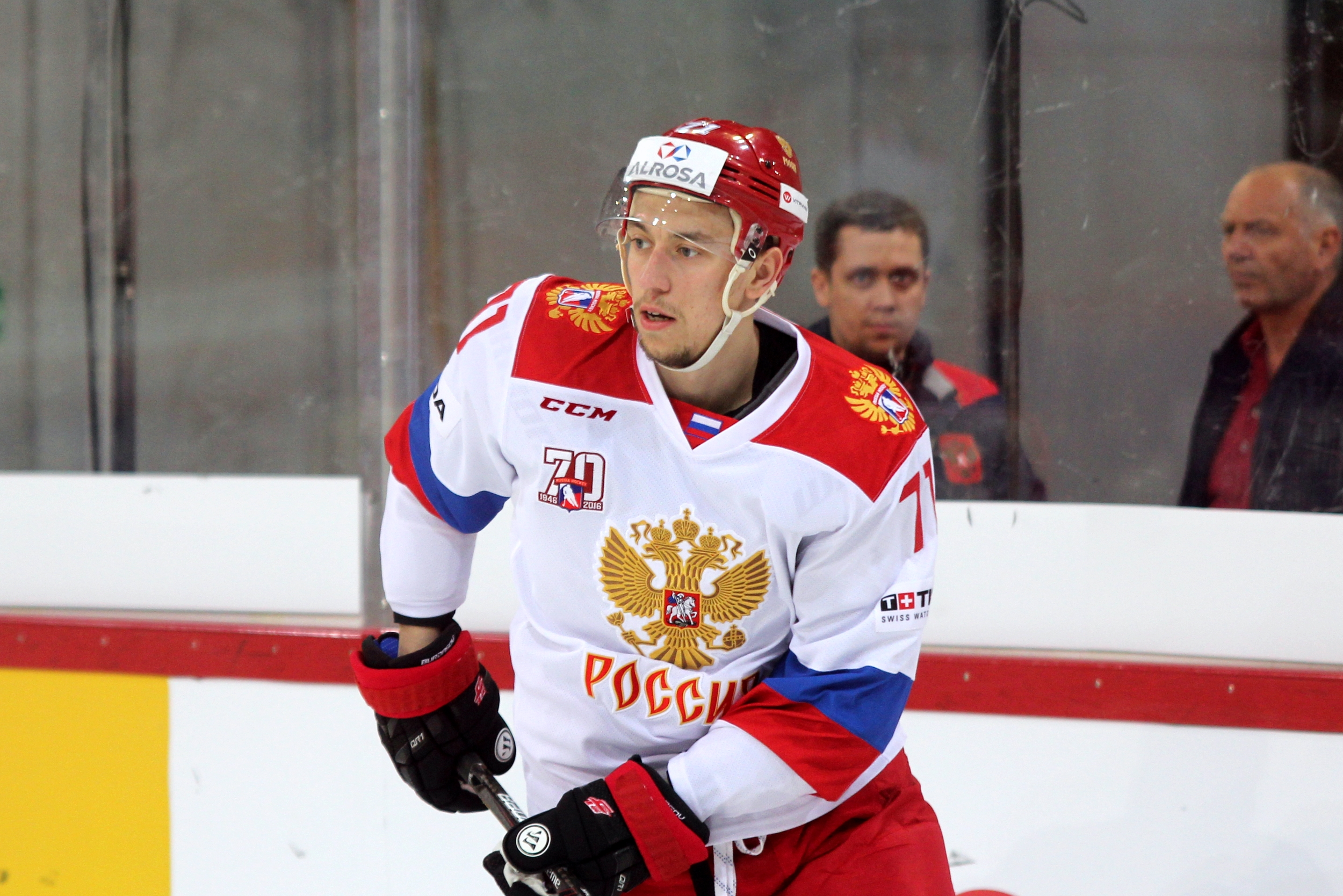
- Born: 9 May 1991 (age 34); Chelyabinsk, Russian SFSR, Soviet Union
- Height: 6 ft 3 in (191 cm)
- Weight: 225 lb (102 kg; 16 st 1 lb)
- Position: Right wing
- Shoots: Left
- KHL team Former teams: Free agent Traktor Chelyabinsk; SKA Saint Petersburg; Avangard Omsk; CSKA Moscow; Salavat Yulaev Ufa; Barys Astana
- National team: Russia
- NHL draft: Undrafted
- Playing career: 2009–present

Anton Burdasov (born 9 May 1991) is a Russian professional ice hockey forward who is currently an unrestricted free agent. He most recently played for Barys Astana in the Kontinental Hockey League (KHL).

== Playing career ==
Burdasov began his KHL career by making his debut with Traktor Chelyabinsk during the 2009–10 season. After several seasons and a stint with Avangard Omsk, his trajectory changed following the conclusion of the 2016–17 campaign. On the very first day of free agency, May 1, 2017, Burdasov was traded by Avangard Omsk to CSKA Moscow in a deal that saw Dmitri Kugryshev and Semyon Koshelev move in the opposite direction.

During the 2017–18 season, Burdasov played a limited role with CSKA Moscow, appearing in just 12 games. On October 26, 2017, he was involved in a trade that sent him to Salavat Yulaev Ufa, with CSKA Moscow receiving Denis Kokarev in return.

On September 18, 2019, Burdasov signed a professional tryout contract with the Edmonton Oilers of the NHL. Although he made a good impression, he was released from the tryout on September 28, 2019. Shortly after, on October 5, 2019, Burdasov returned to Russia and signed a one-year deal with his former team, SKA Saint Petersburg.

Following three more seasons playing for SKA Saint Petersburg, Burdasov returned to the team where he began his KHL career, Traktor Chelyabinsk. As a free agent, he signed a three-year contract with Traktor on May 7, 2022.

After completing two full seasons with Traktor Chelyabinsk, Burdasov decided to move on following the conclusion of the 2023–24 campaign. On August 23, 2024, he signed a one-year contract with Barys Astana, the KHL team based in Kazakhstan.

== Career statistics ==
=== Regular season and playoffs ===
			Regular season					Playoffs
Season	Team	League	GP	G	A	Pts	PIM	GP	G	A	Pts	PIM
2009–10	Traktor Chelyabinsk	KHL	21	0	0	0	4	1	0	0	0	0
2009–10	Belye Medvedi Chelyabinsk	MHL	24	12	8	20	38	12	3	4	7	18
2010–11	Traktor Chelyabinsk	KHL	18	2	1	3	8	—	—	—	—	—
2010–11	Belye Medvedi Chelyabinsk	MHL	28	18	16	34	32	5	2	3	5	0
2011–12	Traktor Chelyabinsk	KHL	53	7	8	15	16	16	1	2	3	8
2011–12	Belye Medvedi Chelyabinsk	MHL	6	6	3	9	2	—	—	—	—	—
2012–13	SKA Saint Petersburg	KHL	48	3	10	13	14	14	3	3	6	26
2013–14	SKA Saint Petersburg	KHL	21	2	4	6	33	—	—	—	—	—
2014–15	SKA Saint Petersburg	KHL	43	9	8	17	20	20	3	3	6	14
2015–16	SKA Saint Petersburg	KHL	40	14	17	31	16	—	—	—	—	—
2015–16	Avangard Omsk	KHL	16	1	8	9	10	11	2	2	4	27
2016–17	Avangard Omsk	KHL	35	17	8	25	12	11	4	2	6	8
2017–18	CSKA Moscow	KHL	12	4	3	7	4	—	—	—	—	—
2017–18	Salavat Yulaev Ufa	KHL	29	11	8	19	14	14	2	3	5	6
2018–19	Salavat Yulaev Ufa	KHL	50	19	12	31	114	2	0	0	0	2
2019–20	SKA Saint Petersburg	KHL	31	9	5	14	6	4	1	3	4	0
2020–21	SKA Saint Petersburg	KHL	48	23	14	37	10	15	2	4	6	4
2021–22	SKA Saint Petersburg	KHL	41	23	19	42	14	16	3	7	10	4
2022–23	Traktor Chelyabinsk	KHL	48	19	27	46	14	—	—	—	—	—
2023–24	Traktor Chelyabinsk	KHL	56	19	17	36	24	14	4	4	8	4
2024–25	Barys Astana	KHL	53	12	5	17	20	—	—	—	—	—
KHL totals			663	194	174	368	353	138	26	32	58	103

=== International ===
Year	Team	Event	Result	GP	G	A	Pts	PIM
2008	Russia	U17	5th	5	1	4	5	4
2008	Russia	IH18	2nd place, silver medalist(s)	4	1	0	1	4
2011	Russia	WJC	1st place, gold medalist(s)	7	0	1	1	6
2021	ROC	WC	5th	8	2	4	6	0
Junior totals				16	2	5	7	14
Senior totals				18	4	2	6	0

== Awards and honors ==
Award	Year
KHL
Gagarin Cup (SKA Saint Petersburg)	2015
