= Fredrik Händemark =

Swedish ice hockey player

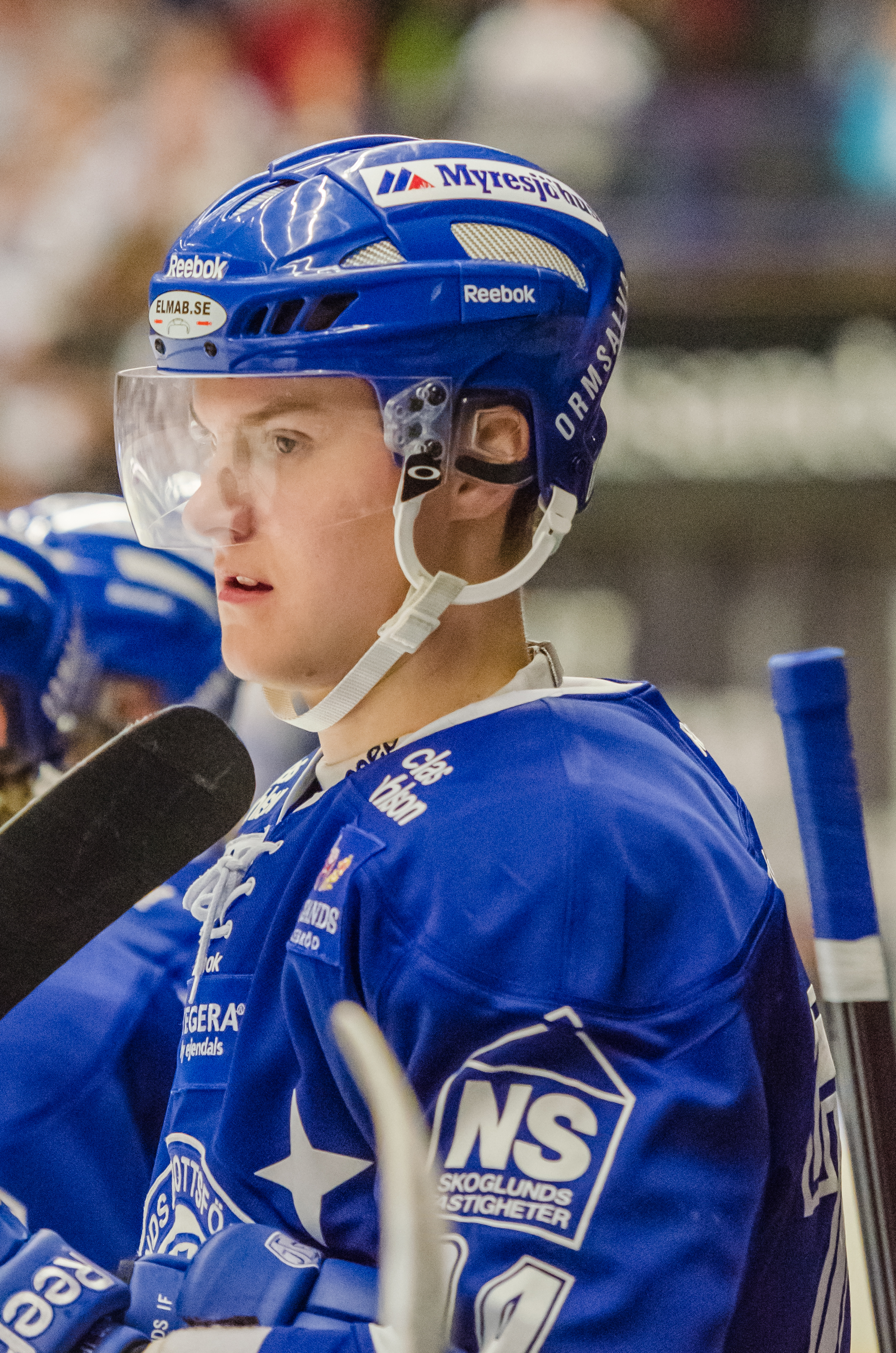
- Händemark with Leksands IF in 2013
- Born: August 27, 1993 (age 33) Björbo, Sweden
- Height: 6 ft 4 in (193 cm)
- Weight: 209 lb (95 kg; 14 st 13 lb)
- Position: Centre
- Shoots: Left
- SHL team Former teams: Malmö Redhawks; Leksands IF; San Jose Sharks; SKA Saint Petersburg
- NHL draft: Undrafted
- Playing career: 2013–present

Fredrik Händemark (born August 27, 1993) is a Swedish professional ice hockey player currently under contract with Malmö Redhawks of the Swedish Hockey League (SHL).

== Playing career ==
Undrafted, Händemark made his Swedish Hockey League debut playing with Leksands IF during the 2013–14 SHL season.

After serving as captain for three seasons with the Malmö Redhawks of the SHL, Händemark signed with the San Jose Sharks of the National Hockey League on May 4, 2020.

On August 10, 2020, Händemark agreed to return and continue his tenure with the Redhawks on loan from the Sharks until the commencement of the delayed 2020–21 North American season. He made his NHL debut on January 18, 2021, in a 4–5 loss to the St. Louis Blues. He scored his first NHL goal on March 12, 2021, in a 6–0 win against the Anaheim Ducks at the Honda Center. In 8 games with the Sharks, Händemark finished with a lone goal, primarily assigned to the club's taxi squad.

As an impending free agent from the Sharks, Händemark left the club after one season by agreeing to a two-year contract with Russian club, SKA Saint Petersburg of the KHL, on 17 June 2021 but he returned to Sweden on October 15 and joined Malmö Redhawks.

== Career statistics ==
			Regular season					Playoffs
Season	Team	League	GP	G	A	Pts	PIM	GP	G	A	Pts	PIM
2009–10	Leksands IF	J20	15	3	1	4	16	5	1	1	2	4
2010–11	Leksands IF	J20	39	11	13	24	38	—	—	—	—	—
2011–12	Leksands IF	J20	27	7	11	18	42	2	1	0	1	0
2011–12	Leksands IF	Allsv	16	3	1	4	6	6	0	1	1	2
2011–12	Borlänge HF	Div.1	6	3	1	4	8	—	—	—	—	—
2012–13	Leksands IF	J20	23	13	10	23	18	—	—	—	—	—
2012–13	Leksands IF	Allsv	42	4	5	9	8	10	0	2	2	2
2012–13	Borlänge HF	Div.1	3	2	1	3	2	—	—	—	—	—
2013–14	Leksands IF	SHL	52	1	5	6	18	3	0	0	0	0
2013–14	Leksands IF	J20	3	5	2	7	4	—	—	—	—	—
2014–15	Leksands IF	SHL	54	1	2	3	22	—	—	—	—	—
2015–16	IK Pantern	Allsv	33	9	11	20	10	—	—	—	—	—
2015–16	Malmö Redhawks	SHL	23	1	2	3	8	—	—	—	—	—
2016–17	Malmö Redhawks	SHL	47	13	19	32	8	13	3	6	9	6
2017–18	Malmö Redhawks	SHL	52	11	17	28	32	10	0	4	4	6
2018–19	Malmö Redhawks	SHL	49	6	20	26	91	5	1	3	4	6
2019–20	Malmö Redhawks	SHL	52	14	24	38	65	—	—	—	—	—
2020–21	Malmö Redhawks	SHL	25	6	9	15	16	—	—	—	—	—
2020–21	San Jose Sharks	NHL	8	1	0	1	2	—	—	—	—	—
2020–21	San Jose Barracuda	AHL	14	4	4	8	2	—	—	—	—	—
2021–22	SKA Saint Petersburg	KHL	15	2	4	6	2	—	—	—	—	—
2021–22	Malmö Redhawks	SHL	40	6	12	18	8	—	—	—	—	—
2022–23	Malmö Redhawks	SHL	47	8	14	22	43	—	—	—	—	—
2023–24	Malmö Redhawks	SHL	52	11	21	32	14	—	—	—	—	—
2024–25	Malmö Redhawks	SHL	51	7	18	25	30	8	0	5	5	2
SHL totals			544	85	163	248	355	39	4	18	22	20
NHL totals			8	1	0	1	2	—	—	—	—	—
KHL totals			15	2	4	6	2	—	—	—	—	—
