= Magnus Hellberg =

Swedish ice hockey player (born 1991)

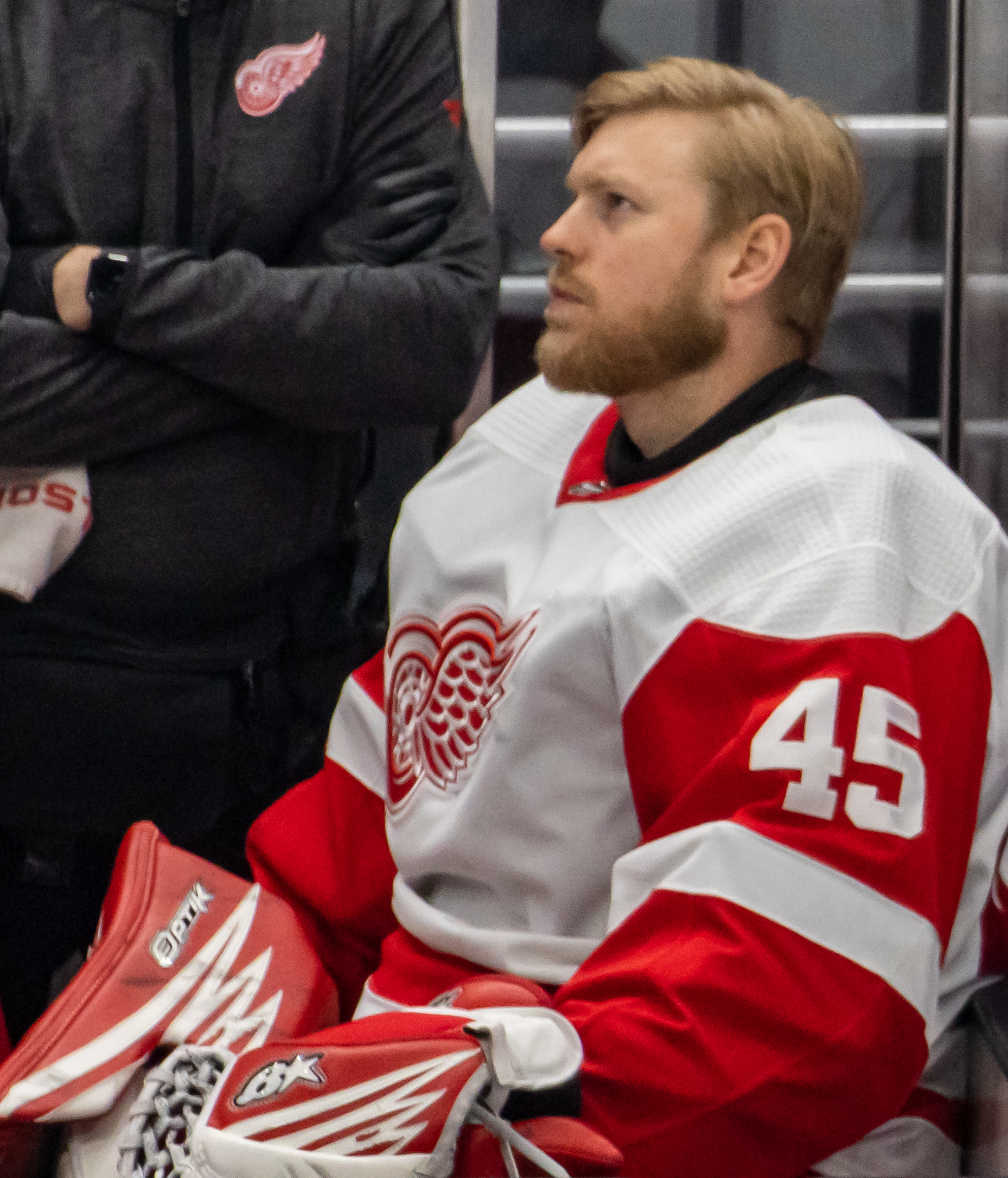
- Hellberg with the Detroit Red Wings in 2023
- Born: 4 April 1991 (age 35) Uppsala, Sweden
- Height: 6 ft 6 in (198 cm)
- Weight: 209 lb (95 kg; 14 st 13 lb)
- Position: Goaltender
- Catches: Left
- SHL team Former teams: Djurgårdens IF; Frölunda HC; Nashville Predators; New York Rangers; Kunlun Red Star; SKA Saint Petersburg; HC Sochi; Detroit Red Wings; Ottawa Senators; Pittsburgh Penguins
- National team: Sweden
- NHL draft: 38th overall, 2011; Nashville Predators
- Playing career: 2009–present

Magnus Hellberg (born 4 April 1991) is a Swedish professional ice hockey player who is a goaltender for Djurgårdens IF of the Swedish Hockey League (SHL). He has previously played in the National Hockey League (NHL) with the Nashville Predators, New York Rangers, Ottawa Senators, Detroit Red Wings, and Pittsburgh Penguins.

== Playing career ==
Hellberg was selected 38th overall by the Nashville Predators in the 2011 NHL entry draft and was the first goaltender selected in the draft. Hellberg almost did not make the trip from Sweden to St. Paul, Minnesota, for the draft, citing it was "50-50" that he'd even be drafted. Because of the last-minute decision to come, the only person with him was his agent. He was the first player to wear the new, redesigned Nashville jersey. The team still had not unveiled the home gold version, and the road white debuted at the 2011 NHL Entry Draft. Additionally, the Predators did not have a first-round pick, giving Hellberg the honor of becoming the first player to wear it.

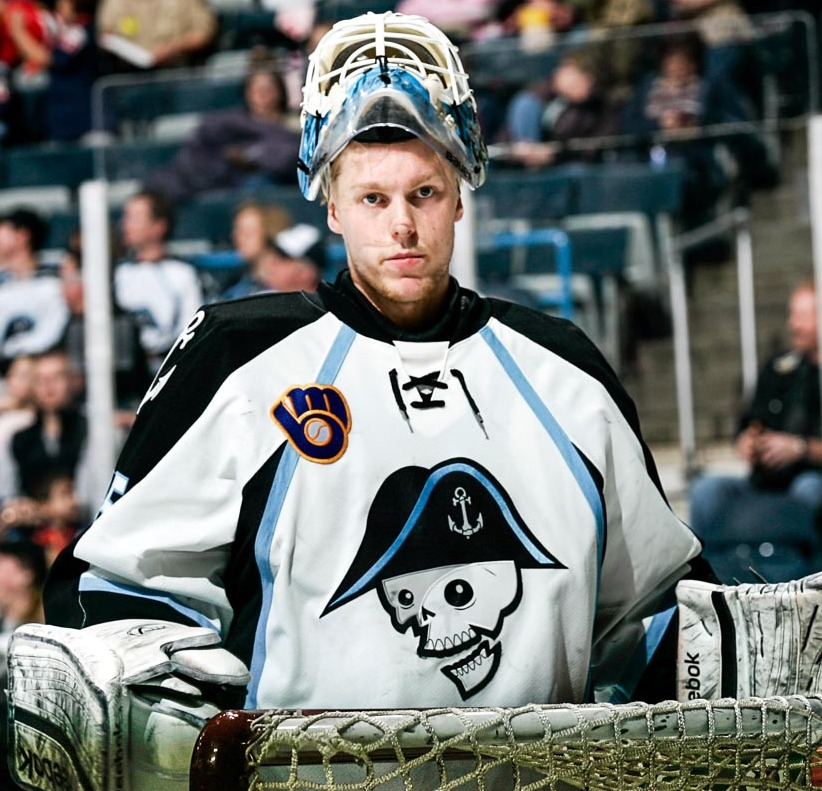
Hellberg with the Milwaukee Admirals in 2013

During the 2012–13 season, Hellberg appeared in 39 regular season games with the Milwaukee Admirals of the American Hockey League (AHL) and two games with the Cincinnati Cyclones of the ECHL. He added four more games with Milwaukee during AHL postseason. Hellberg was recalled by Nashville on 24 October 2013 after Pekka Rinne suffered an injury. On 26 October, Hellberg made his NHL debut with the Predators, playing 12 minutes after replacing starter Carter Hutton in a game against the St. Louis Blues. After being returned to Milwaukee, Hellberg suffered a high ankle sprain when his skate caught under a goal post which caused him to miss three months. With the Predators system crowded at both NHL and AHL levels, he was assigned to ECHL affiliate, the Cyclones, to finish the 2013–14 season. He played the entire 2014–15 season with Milwaukee, representing the team at the AHL All-Star Game.

On 1 July 2015, Hellberg was traded to the New York Rangers for a sixth-round pick in the 2017 NHL entry draft. Hellberg was assigned to the Rangers AHL affiliate, the Hartford Wolf Pack, upon his arrival in New York but was called up on 18 December to serve as a backup to Henrik Lundqvist while Antti Raanta was recovering from a head injury. Hellberg made his Rangers debut in a 20 December game against the Washington Capitals after Lundqvist allowed five goals, including four in the second period; Hellberg allowed two goals in the third period as the Rangers eventually lost the game 7–3. (Note: The source states that this was Hellberg's NHL debut, which is incorrect. This was his season and Rangers debut.) After Raanta was cleared to return, Hellberg was sent back down to the Wolf Pack in late December.

Hellberg was called up to the NHL three times during the 2016–17 season; the first call-up came on 15 January 2017 after Raanta suffered a lower-body injury against the Montreal Canadiens. As a result, Hellberg was called up to the NHL to back up Lundqvist for one week while Raanta recovered. Hellberg took the ice once as he replaced Lundqvist during the third period of the 17 January game against the Dallas Stars; the Rangers lost the game 7–6 despite rallying from a 7–3 deficit. He was called up again in March after Lundqvist suffered a hip injury. He served as Raanta's backup for five games but did not see any ice time. Hellberg was called up a third time for a season-ending back-to-back set of games after Raanta suffered another lower-body injury. Hellberg sat on the bench as Lundqvist's backup in the first game (a 3–1 loss to the Ottawa Senators), but Hellberg made his first NHL start in the second game (Rangers' season finale) against the Pittsburgh Penguins. He stopped 22 of 24 shots as the Rangers won the game 3–2.

As an impending free agent, Hellberg left the NHL and signed a one-year contract to be the starting goaltender of Chinese club, Kunlun Red Star of the Kontinental Hockey League (KHL), on 25 May 2017. In the 2017–18 season, despite registering just 16 wins in 51 games, Hellberg was a standout for the underperforming Kunlun, posting a .926 save percentage. Having earlier signed a one-year extension with Kunlun during the season, Hellberg was traded the following off-season by the Red Star to perennial contending club, SKA Saint Petersburg, in exchange for financial compensation on 28 May 2018.

After three stellar seasons with SKA Saint Petersburg, Hellberg left the club at the conclusion of his contract and opted to continue in the KHL by agreeing to a one-year deal with HC Sochi on 15 June 2021. In the 2021–22 season, posted a respectable 2.42 goals-against average, and a .917 save percentage for five shutouts in 37 games with Sochi. Unable to help Sochi qualify for the postseason, Hellberg signed a one-year contract in a return to the NHL for the remainder of the Detroit Red Wings' season on 13 April 2022. He made one appearance, starting Detroit's season finale on 29 April, a 5–3 win over the New Jersey Devils.

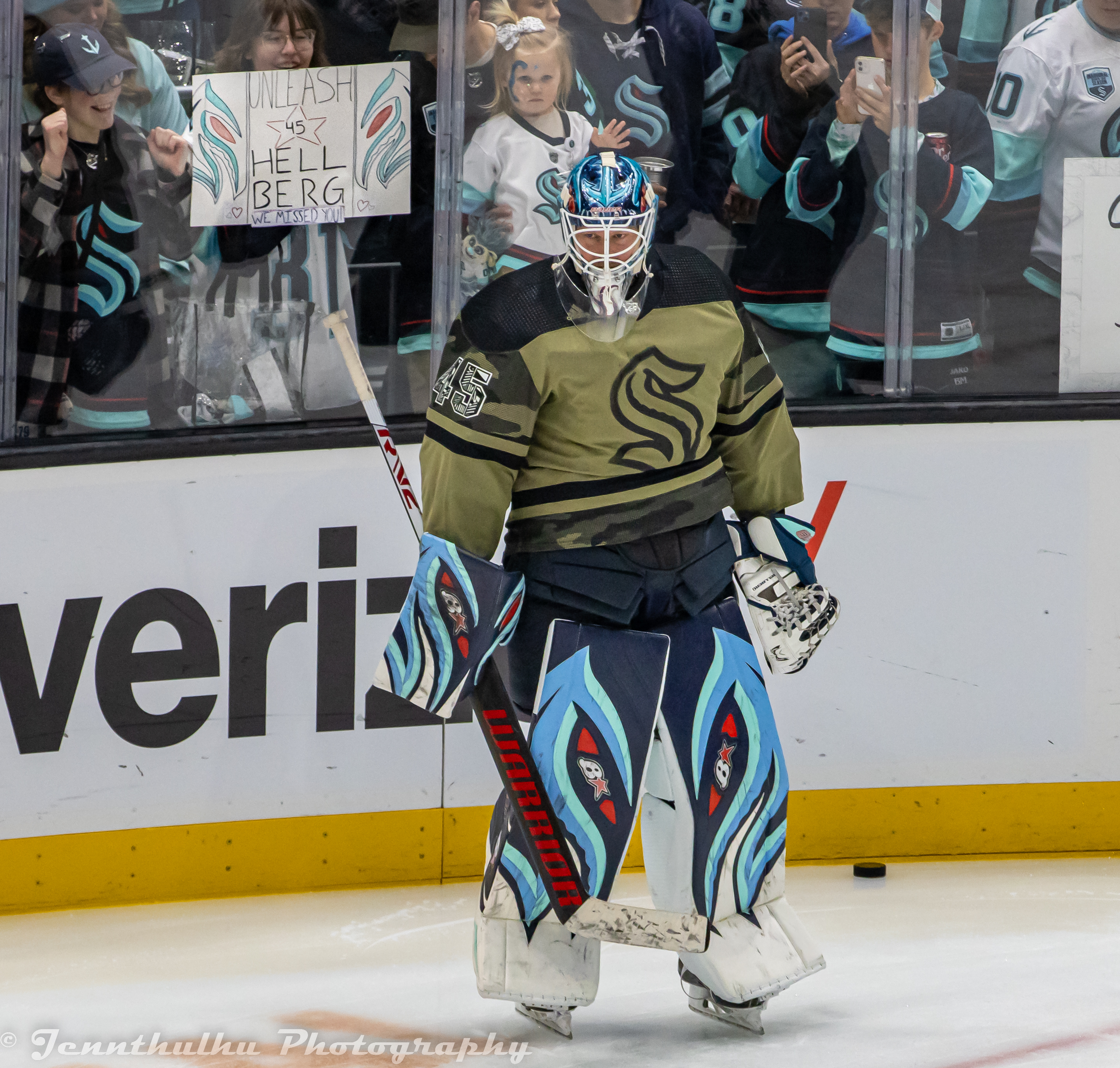
Hellberg with the Seattle Kraken in 2022.

On 13 July 2022, Hellberg left the Red Wings as a free agent and was signed to a one-year, $750,000 contract with the Seattle Kraken. After attending the Kraken's 2022 training camp, Hellberg was placed on waivers during the pre-season to be reassigned to the AHL. On 3 October 2022, Hellberg was claimed off waivers by the Ottawa Senators following an injury to starting goaltender Cam Talbot. On 10 November, after one appearance with Ottawa, Hellberg was placed on waivers by the Senators and was re-claimed by Seattle.

Hellberg served as the backup to Martin Jones through several games with the Kraken before he was placed on waivers after the return to health of goaltender Philipp Grubauer on 22 November. Without featuring for the Kraken, Hellberg was claimed off waivers by former club, the Detroit Red Wings, on 23 November 2022. On 28 December 2022, Hellberg came into the game as relief for starter Ville Husso after Husso gave up four goals in the first period to the Pittsburgh Penguins. The Red Wings scored four unanswered goals to force overtime and went on to win 5–4, with Hellberg making 19 saves.

Leaving the Red Wings as a free agent for the second successive season, Hellberg continued in North America, agreeing to a one-year, two-way contract with the Pittsburgh Penguins for the 2023–24 season on 2 July 2023. He was placed on waivers by Pittsburgh on 8 October 2023 and after going unclaimed, was assigned to their AHL affiliate, the Wilkes-Barre/Scranton Penguins to start the 2023–24 season. After an injury to goaltender Alex Nedeljkovic early in the season, Hellberg was called up to the NHL by the Penguins. He made his first appearance for Pittsburgh in relief of Tristan Jarry after Jarry gave up three goals to the Ottawa Senators on 28 October. Hellberg stopped 15 of the 17 shots he faced as the Penguins lost 5–2. He came in relief again for an injured Jarry on 7 November, sharing a 2–0 shutout over the Anaheim Ducks. He started the next game on 9 November, notching his first NHL win of the season in a 4–3 overtime win over the Los Angeles Kings. Upon Nedeljkovic's return, Hellberg was reassigned to Wilkes-Barre on 19 November. He played in 19 games with Wilkes-Barre/Scranton, recording nine wins, eight losses and two overtime losses.

On 8 March 2024, the Penguins traded Hellberg to the Florida Panthers in exchange for goaltender Ludovic Waeber and a conditional 2025 seventh-round pick. He joined Florida's AHL affiliate, the Charlotte Checkers, after the trade. He made eight regular-season appearances with Charlotte, and one appearance in the 2024 Calder Cup playoffs.

Leaving the Panthers as a free agent without featuring for the club, Hellberg continued his career in North America after agreeing to a one-year, two-way contract with the Dallas Stars on 13 August 2024. He was placed on waivers and after going unclaimed, was assigned to Dallas' AHL affiliate, the Texas Stars, for the 2024–25 season.

At the conclusion of his contract with the Stars, Hellberg as a pending free agent opted to return to his native Sweden, joining Djurgårdens IF of the SHL on a three-year contract on 12 June 2025.

== International play ==
Medal record

Ice hockey

Representing Sweden

World Championships
Gold medal – first place	2018 Denmark	

Hellberg represented Sweden at the 2018 IIHF World Championship, backstopping the team to the gold medal in a 3–2 win over Switzerland. He joined Sweden again for the 2022 Winter Olympics. Hellberg once again played for Sweden at the 2022 IIHF World Championship.

== Career statistics ==
=== Regular season and playoffs ===
			Regular season									Playoffs
Season	Team	League	GP	W	L	T/OT	MIN	GA	SO	GAA	SV%	GP	W	L	MIN	GA	SO	GAA	SV%
2010–11	Almtuna IS	Allsv	31	—	—	—	1790	61	5	2.04	.935	—	—	—	—	—	—	—	—
2011–12	Frölunda HC	SHL	17	—	—	—	1016	42	2	2.48	.908	—	—	—	—	—	—	—	—
2011–12	Örebro HK	Allsv	1	1	0	0	61	2	0	1.98	.923	2	—	—	—	—	—	4.04	.884
2012–13	Milwaukee Admirals	AHL	39	22	13	0	2107	75	6	2.14	.924	4	1	3	248	7	1	1.69	.944
2012–13	Cincinnati Cyclones	ECHL	2	1	1	0	119	5	0	2.52	.923	—	—	—	—	—	—	—	—
2013–14	Milwaukee Admirals	AHL	21	5	13	1	1168	55	1	2.82	.911	—	—	—	—	—	—	—	—
2013–14	Nashville Predators	NHL	1	0	0	0	12	1	0	5.00	.750	—	—	—	—	—	—	—	—
2013–14	Cincinnati Cyclones	ECHL	7	5	1	1	394	19	0	2.89	.901	—	—	—	—	—	—	—	—
2014–15	Milwaukee Admirals	AHL	38	15	10	6	2007	78	3	2.33	.913	—	—	—	—	—	—	—	—
2015–16	Hartford Wolf Pack	AHL	53	30	20	3	3098	124	3	2.40	.918	—	—	—	—	—	—	—	—
2015–16	New York Rangers	NHL	1	0	0	0	20	2	0	6.00	.667	—	—	—	—	—	—	—	—
2016–17	Hartford Wolf Pack	AHL	36	12	15	5	1990	98	1	2.95	.903	—	—	—	—	—	—	—	—
2016–17	New York Rangers	NHL	2	1	0	0	79	2	0	1.52	.929	—	—	—	—	—	—	—	—
2017–18	Kunlun Red Star	KHL	51	16	26	3	2761	110	6	2.39	.926	—	—	—	—	—	—	—	—
2018–19	SKA Saint Petersburg	KHL	34	24	7	3	2048	45	8	1.32	.940	10	7	2	571	16	1	1.68	.919
2019–20	SKA Saint Petersburg	KHL	26	14	7	3	1443	41	3	1.70	.927	2	2	0	173	2	1	0.69	.977
2020–21	SKA Saint Petersburg	KHL	21	14	4	1	1172	37	2	1.89	.930	10	7	2	591	13	2	1.32	.943
2021–22	HC Sochi	KHL	37	13	20	4	2134	86	5	2.42	.917	—	—	—	—	—	—	—	—
2021–22	Detroit Red Wings	NHL	1	1	0	0	60	3	0	3.00	.870	—	—	—	—	—	—	—	—
2022–23	Ottawa Senators	NHL	1	1	0	0	60	2	0	2.00	.935	—	—	—	—	—	—	—	—
2022–23	Detroit Red Wings	NHL	17	4	8	1	876	48	0	3.29	.885	—	—	—	—	—	—	—	—
2022–23	Grand Rapids Griffins	AHL	4	2	2	0	240	10	0	2.50	.932	—	—	—	—	—	—	—	—
2023–24	Pittsburgh Penguins	NHL	3	1	0	0	119	5	0	2.50	.922	—	—	—	—	—	—	—	—
2023–24	Wilkes-Barre/Scranton Penguins	AHL	19	9	8	2	1088	53	0	2.92	.905	—	—	—	—	—	—	—	—
2023–24	Charlotte Checkers	AHL	8	5	2	0	436	17	1	2.34	.898	1	0	1	55	3	0	3.24	.857
2024–25	Texas Stars	AHL	41	24	14	1	2342	105	2	2.69	.904	6	3	3	330	13	0	2.36	.921
NHL totals			26	8	8	1	1,226	63	0	3.08	.890	—	—	—	—	—	—	—	—
KHL totals			169	81	64	14	9,558	319	24	2.00	.927	22	16	4	1,335	31	4	1.39	.940

=== International ===
Year	Team	Event	Result	GP	W	L	OT	MIN	GA	SO	GAA	SV%
2018	Sweden	WC	1st place, gold medalist(s)	3	3	0	0	184	5	1	1.63	.938
2022	Sweden	OG	4th	2	1	1	0	122	5	0	2.46	.927
2022	Sweden	WC	6th	4	4	0	0	245	6	1	1.47	.932
2026	Sweden	WC	7th	5	3	2	0	293	14	1	2.87	.879
Senior totals				14	11	3	0	844	30	3	2.13	.913

== Awards and honours ==
Award	Year	Ref
AHL
All-Star Game	2015	
