= Jere Karjalainen =

Finnish ice hockey player

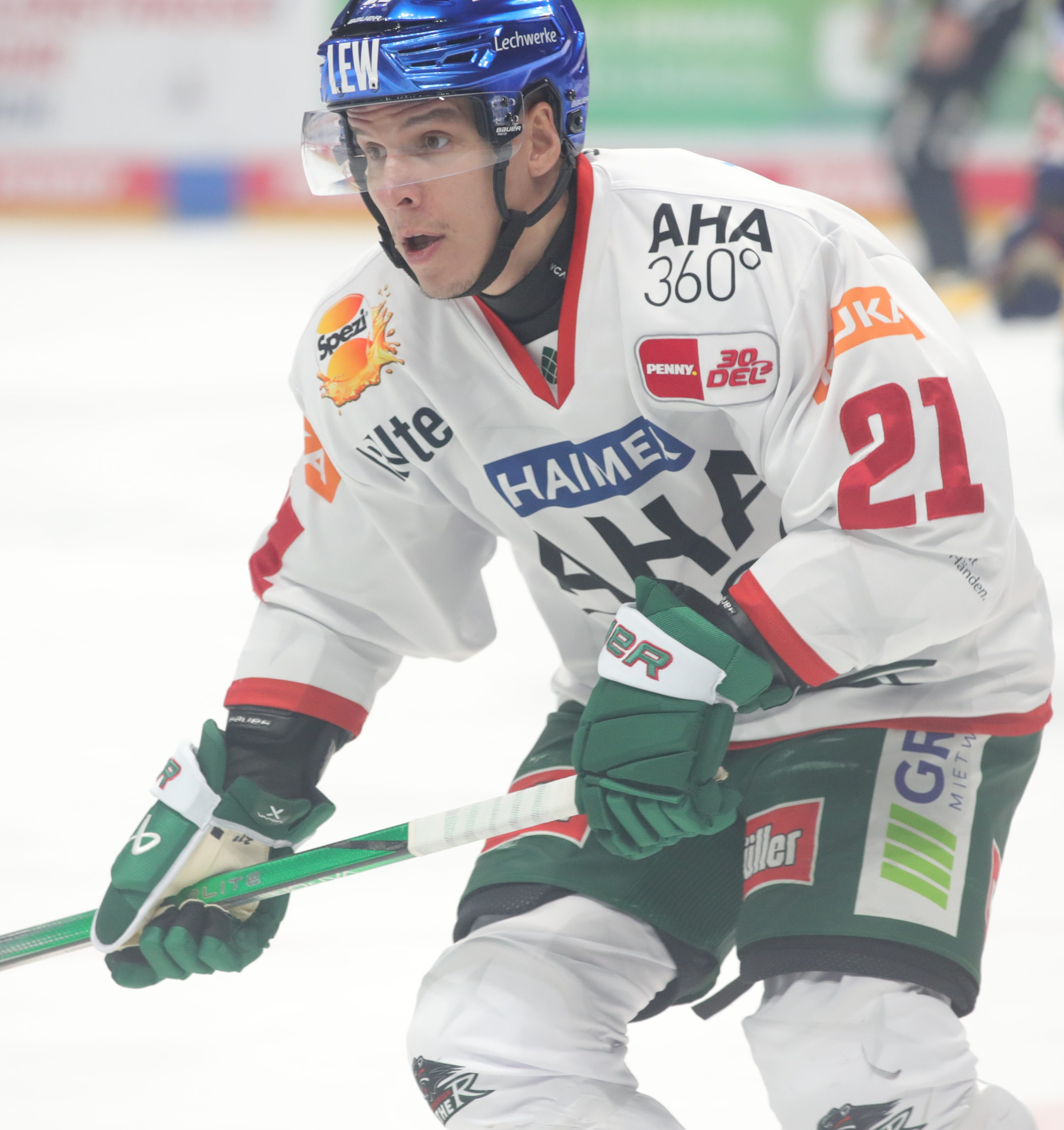
- Karjalainen, 2023
- Born: May 23, 1992 (age 33) Helsinki, Finland
- Height: 5 ft 9 in (175 cm)
- Weight: 176 lb (80 kg; 12 st 8 lb)
- Position: Right wing
- Shoots: Right
- DEL team Former teams: Augsburger Panther; Jokerit; HPK; Tappara; HC Sochi; Dinamo Riga; Lukko
- National team: Finland
- Playing career: 2013–present

Jere Karjalainen (born May 23, 1992) is a Finnish professional ice hockey player. He is currently playing with Augsburger Panther in the Deutsche Eishockey Liga (DEL).

== Playing career ==
Karjalainen made his SM-liiga debut playing with Jokerit during the 2012–13 SM-liiga season.

After eight seasons in the Liiga with Jokerit, HPK and Tappara, Karjalainen left Finland following the 2019–20 season to sign a one-year contract with Russian club, HC Sochi of the KHL, on 2 May 2020.

Karjalainen left HC Sochi as a free agent and signed a one-year contract with fellow KHL club, Dinamo Riga, on 3 May 2021.

After two seasons abroad, Karjalainen returned to Finland in signing a one-year contract with Lukko on 14 August 2022.

== Career statistics ==
Medal record

Representing Finland

Ice hockey

World Championships
Silver medal – second place	2021 Latvia	

=== International ===
Year	Team	Event	Result	GP	G	A	Pts	PIM
2021	Finland	WC	2nd place, silver medalist(s)	3	0	0	0	0
Senior totals				3	0	0	0	0
