= Teemu Turunen =

Finnish footballer (born 1986)

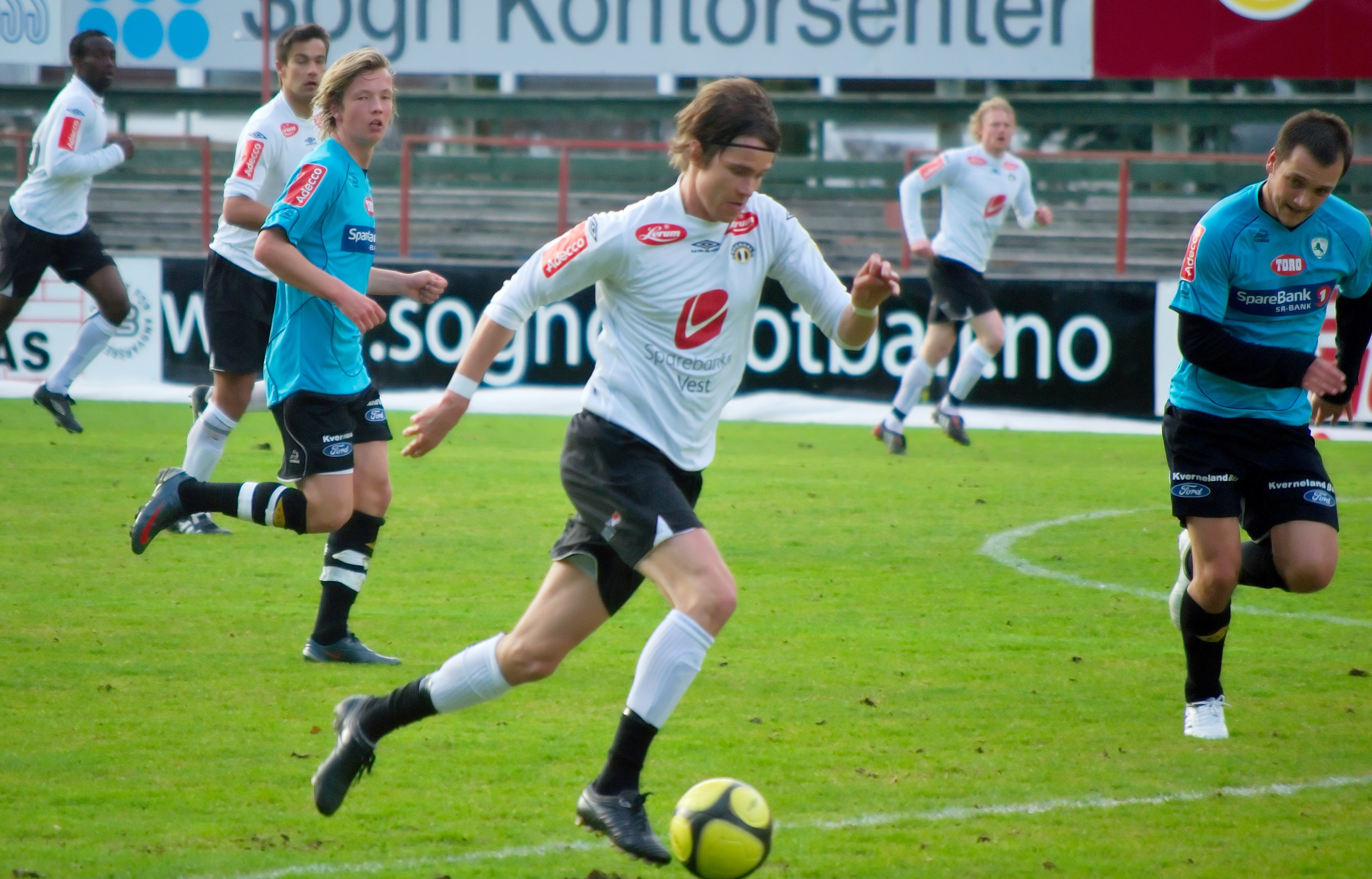

Personal information
- Full name: Teemu Oskari Turunen
- Date of birth: 19 January 1986 (age 40)
- Place of birth: Kuopio, Finland
- Height: 1.85 m (6 ft 1 in)
- Position: Attacking midfielder

Senior career*
Years	Team	Apps	(Gls)
2004–2006	KooTeePee	53	(8)
2007–2008	Inter Turku	32	(4)
2008	KooTeePee	12	(0)
2009	Sogndal	1	(0)
2009	Falkenberg	1	(0)
2010	KooTeePee	11	(0)
2011	Lahti	19	(6)
Total		129	(18)
- * Club domestic league appearances and goals

Teemu Oskari Turunen (born 19 January 1986) is a Finnish football agent and a former footballer who played as a midfielder. He made his debut in Veikkausliiga in 2004 for KooTeePee. Turunen is a member of Finland national under-21 football team and he has visited the training camps of several foreign professional teams including Udinese, Rangers F.C., and SC Heerenveen. Teemu's younger brother Tuomo is also a former footballer.

Since his retirement at the age of 25, Turunen studied law at the University of Helsinki, and has worked as an agent. He has represented his childhood friend Teemu Pukki.

== Career statistics ==
As of 1 September 2024.

Appearances and goals by club, season and competition
Club	Season	League			Cup (Note: Includes Suomen Cup)		Total	
Club	Season	Division	Apps	Goals	Apps	Goals	Apps	Goals
KooTeePee	2004	Veikkausliiga	7	0	–		7	0
KooTeePee	2005	Veikkausliiga	24	4	–		24	4
KooTeePee	2006	Veikkausliiga	22	4	–		22	4
KooTeePee	Total		53	8	0	0	53	8
Inter Turku	2007	Veikkausliiga	24	4	–		24	4
Inter Turku	2008	Veikkausliiga	8	0	–		8	0
Inter Turku	Total		32	4	0	0	32	4
KooTeePee	2008	Veikkausliiga	12	0	–		12	0
Sogndal	2009	1. divisjon	1	0	–		1	0
Sogndal 2	2009	3. divisjon	2	0	–		2	0
Falkenberg	2009	Superettan	1	0	–		1	0
KooTeePee	2010	Ykkönen	11	0	–		11	0
Lahti	2011	Veikkausliiga	19	6	2	1	21	7
Career total			131	18	2	2	133	20
