= Alexander Samonov =

Russian ice hockey player

- Born: 23 August 1995 (age 31) Moscow, Russia
- Height: 6 ft 0 in (183 cm)
- Weight: 180 lb (82 kg; 12 st 12 lb)
- Position: Goaltender
- Catches: Left
- KHL team Former teams: CSKA Moscow; HC Vityaz; SKA Saint Petersburg; Severstal Cherepovets; Salavat Yulaev Ufa
- National team: Russia
- Playing career: 2017–present

Alexander Alexandrovich Samonov (Russian: Александр Александрович Самонов; born 23 August 1995) is a Russian professional ice hockey goaltender currently playing for HC CSKA Moscow of the Kontinental Hockey League (KHL).

== Playing career ==
In the midst of his fourth season with SKA Saint Petersburg in 2022–23, having made 14 appearances, Samonov was traded to fellow KHL club, Severstal Cherepovets, alongside Daniil Pylenkov, in exchange for goaltender Vladislav Podyapolski on 14 November 2022.

After playing out the season with Severstal, Samonov's brief tenure with the club ended as he was traded in the off-season to Salavat Yulaev Ufa in exchange for Danil Aimurzin on 18 May 2023.

During the 2025–26 season, Samonov made 13 appearances with Salavat before he was traded to CSKA Moscow in exchange for financial compensation on 2 November 2026.

== International play ==
Medal record

Representing ROC

Olympic Games
Silver medal – second place	2022 Beijing	

Representing Russia

Ice hockey

Winter Universiade
Gold medal – first place	2017 Kazakhstan	

On 23 January 2022, Samonov was named to the roster to represent Russian Olympic Committee athletes at the 2022 Winter Olympics.

== Career statistics ==
=== Regular season and playoffs ===
			Regular season									Playoffs
Season	Team	League	GP	W	L	OT	MIN	GA	SO	GAA	SV%	GP	W	L	MIN	GA	SO	GAA	SV%
2012–13	Russkie Vityazi Chekhov	MHL	12	1	4	0	460	21	0	2.74	.880	—	—	—	—	—	—	—	—
2013–14	Russkie Vityazi Chekhov	MHL	25	10	9	2	1292	59	0	2.74	.906	—	—	—	—	—	—	—	—
2014–15	Russkie Vityazi Chekhov	MHL	35	11	16	5	1888	111	0	3.53	.898	1	0	1	60	5	0	5.00	.839
2015–16	Russkie Vityazi Chekhov	MHL	20	4	12	3	1122	57	0	3.05	.899	—	—	—	—	—	—	—	—
2016–17	THK Tver	VHL	27	15	7	4	1562	57	3	2.19	.922	4	0	4	239	15	0	3.77	.861
2017–18	HC Vityaz	KHL	6	2	3	0	352	16	0	2.73	.919	—	—	—	—	—	—	—	—
2017–18	HC Dinamo Saint Petersburg	VHL	32	23	4	4	1697	33	10	1.17	.946	14	11	3	957	25	3	1.57	.944
2018–19	HC Vityaz	KHL	13	3	6	1	603	27	1	2.69	.920	3	0	2	90	7	0	4.67	.870
2018–19	HC Dinamo Saint Petersburg	VHL	6	3	2	0	320	10	0	1.88	.895	1	0	1	54	1	0	1.12	.955
2019–20	HC Vityaz	KHL	7	6	0	0	411	6	2	0.88	.976	—	—	—	—	—	—	—	—
2019–20	SKA Saint Petersburg	KHL	18	13	1	3	1019	30	2	1.77	.928	2	2	0	120	4	0	2.01	.923
2020–21	SKA Saint Petersburg	KHL	22	10	8	3	1161	39	2	2.02	.925	8	3	4	438	19	0	2.60	.907
2021–22	SKA Saint Petersburg	KHL	9	3	2	3	399	20	0	3.01	.886	2	0	0	44	1	0	1.36	.929
2022–23	SKA Saint Petersburg	KHL	14	10	3	1	761	24	1	1.89	.930	—	—	—	—	—	—	—	—
2022–23	Severstal Cherepovets	KHL	19	9	8	1	1045	48	1	2.76	.903	6	3	2	332	16	1	2.89	.920
2023–24	Salavat Yulaev Ufa	KHL	49	29	16	3	2848	85	7	1.79	.937	6	2	4	354	14	0	2.37	.906
2024–25	Salavat Yulaev Ufa	KHL	46	25	15	6	2695	107	3	2.38	.924	11	5	6	632	27	1	2.56	.893
2025–26	Salavat Yulaev Ufa	KHL	13	3	8	1	709	36	0	3.05	.887	—	—	—	—	—	—	—	—
2025–26	CSKA Moscow	KHL	19	9	7	1	1021	38	1	2.23	.908	—	—	—	—	—	—	—	—
KHL totals			235	122	77	23	13,021	476	20	2.19	.924	38	15	18	2,010	88	2	2.63	.905

=== International ===
Year	Team	Event	Result	GP	W	L	T	MIN	GA	SO	GAA	SV%
2021	ROC	WC	5th	6	4	1	0	364	8	2	1.32	.944
Totals				6	4	1	0	364	8	2	132	.944
