= 2010 Channel One Cup =

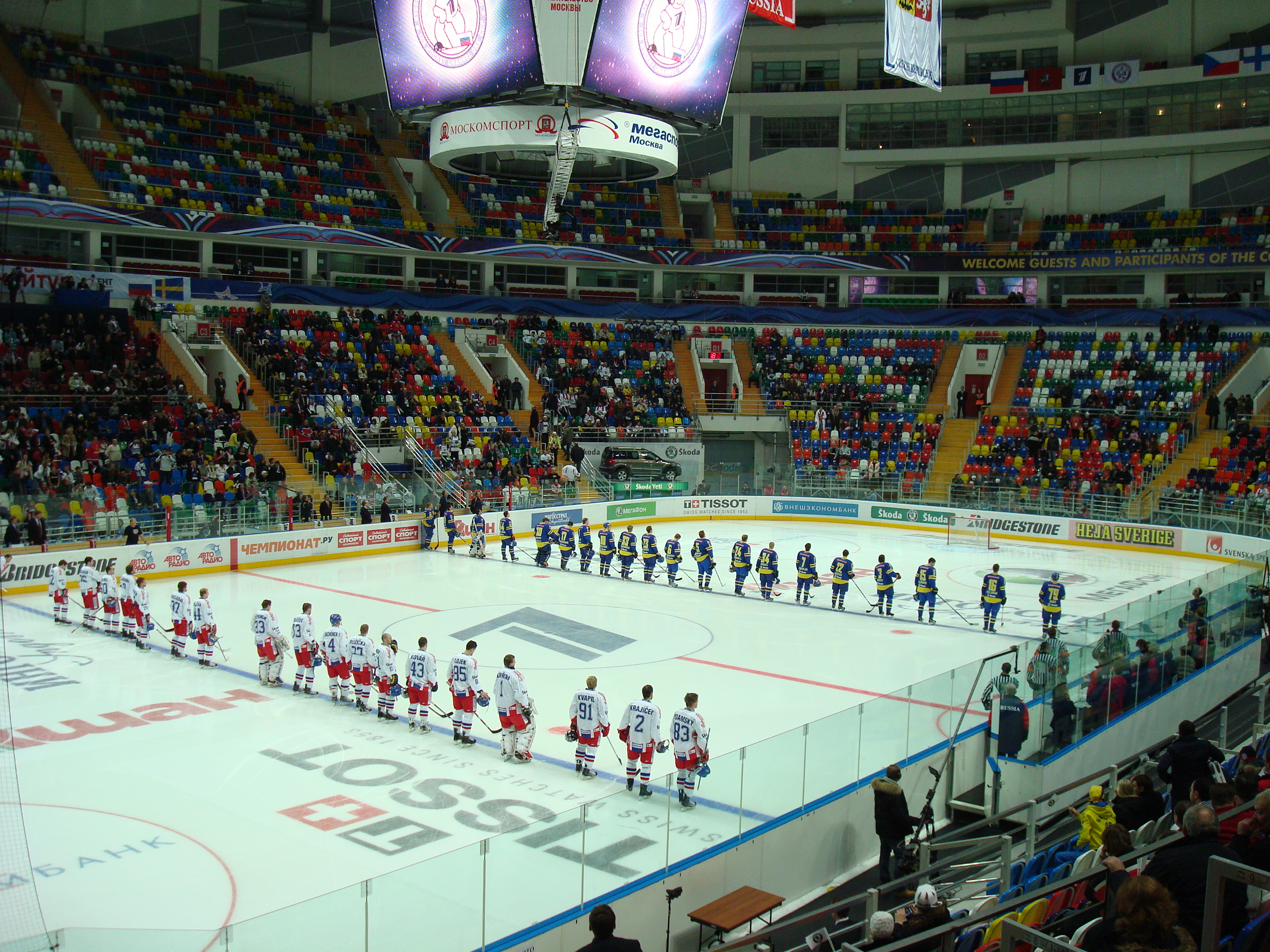
- Czech Republic-Sweden

Tournament details
- Host countries: Russia; Finland
- Cities: Moscow; Espoo
- Venues: 2 (in 2 host cities)
- Dates: 16–19 December 2010
- Teams: 4

Final positions
- Champions: Russia (13th title)
- Runners-up: Czech Republic
- Third place: Sweden
- Fourth place: Finland

Tournament statistics
- Games played: 4
- Goals scored: 37 (9.25 per game)
- Attendance: 55,846 (13,962 per game)
- Scoring leader(s): (Russia) Alexei Morozov (Russia) Alexander Radulov (Russia) Alexei Kaigorodov (5 points)

Awards
- MVP: (Russia) Aleksei Morozov

The 2010 Channel One Cup was the Channel One Cup tournament played between 16 and 19 December 2010. Five matches were played in Megasport Arena in Moscow, Russia, and one match was played in Barona Areena in Espoo, Finland. The tournament was a part of the 2010–11 Euro Hockey Tour.

Russia won the tournament before the Czech Republic and Sweden, while Finland ended up fourth.

== Standings ==
Pos	Team	Pld	W	OTW	OTL	L	GF	GA	GD	Pts
1	Russia	3	3	0	0	0	14	6	+8	9
2	Czech Republic	3	1	1	0	1	8	6	+2	5
3	Sweden	3	1	0	0	2	10	10	0	3
4	Finland	3	0	0	1	2	5	15	−10	1

Source: eurohockey

== Games ==
All times are local. Moscow – (Moscow Time – UTC+4) Espoo – (Eastern European Time – UTC+2).

16 December 2010; 18:30	Finland	2–3 GWS (0–1, 1–0, 1–1) (OT: 0–0) (SO: 0–1)	Czech Republic	Barona Areena, Espoo; Attendance: 5,271

Game reference

Iiro Tarkki
Goalies
Jakub Štěpánek
Referees:
(Sweden) Tobias Björk
(Sweden) Christer Lärking
Linesmen:
(Finland) Mikko Kekäläinen
(Finland) Jussi Terho

	0–1	16:57 – M. Kvapil (P. Koukal, Z. Irgl)
L. Komarov (J. Hytönen, J. Hietanen (PP) – 39:40	1–1
	1–2	52:43 – M. Lojek (Z. Irgl, J. Marek)
M. Lehtonen (J. Karalahti, I. Tarkki) – 54:10	2–2
	2–3	65:00 – M. Kvapil (GWG)

10 min
Penalties
35 min
37
Shots
26

16 December 2010; 20:00	Sweden	3–5 (0–1, 2–2, 1–2)	Russia	Megasport Arena, Moscow; Attendance: 9,875

Game reference

Stefan Liv
Goalies
Vasily Koshechkin
Referees:
(Finland) Jiry Rönn
(Finland) Tom Laaksonen
Linesmen:
(Russia) Sergei Shelyanin
(Russia) Dmitri Sivo

	0–1	17:12 – S. Mozyakin (A. Radulov, K. Korneyev) (PP)
N. Persson (M. Johansson, R. Nilsson) (PP) – 20:25	1–1
	1–2	21:48 – M. Afinogenov
	1–3	22:13 – A. Morozov (N. Belov)
D. Fernholm (B. Melin) – 22:41	2–3
S. Erixon (B. Melin, D. Rundblad) (PP) – 48:48	3–3
	3–4	54:51 – N. Belov (A. Kaigorodov, A. Morozov)
	3–5	59:57 – D. Zaripov (A. Morozov, A. Kaigorodov)

8 min
Penalties
12 min
27
Shots
35

18 December 2010; 14:00	Russia	3–1 (2–0, 1–1, 0–0)	Czech Republic	Megasport Arena, Moscow; Attendance: 12,875

Game reference

Konstantin Barulin
Goalies
Jakub Štěpánek
Referees:
(Finland) Jari Levonen
(Finland) Antti Boman

I. Grigorenko (A. Radulov, S. Mozyakin – 04:17	1–0
I. Nikulin (D. Zaripov, A. Kaigorodov) (PP) – 12:33	2–0
	2–1	21:06 – T. Rolinek (P. Čáslava)
A. Radulov (I. Grigorenko) (PP) – 24:41	3–1

18 min
Penalties
12 min
32
Shots
26

18 December 2010; 18:00	Finland	1–6 (1–2, 0–2, 0–2)	Sweden	Megasport Arena, Moscow; Attendance: 8,125

Game reference

Eera Kipeläinen
Goalies
Daniel Larsson
Referees:
(Russia) Anatoly Zakharov
(Russia) Vyacheslav Bulanov
Linesmen:
(Russia) Viktor Birin
(Russia) Andrei Putilin

	0–1	08:15 – D. Brodin (M. Sjögren, M. Ekholm)
J. Pesonen (M. Pyörälä) – 16:14	1–1
	1–2	18:15 – S. Erixon
	1–3	28:57 – J. Lindström (N. Persson, R. Nilsson) (PP)
	1–4	36:48 – M. Sjögren (D. Brodin, D. Fernholm) (SH)
	1–5	41:25 – N. Danielsson (M. Sjögren) (SH)
	1–6	46:50 – M. Johansson (J. Lindström)

10 min
Penalties
10 min
22
Shots
35

19 December 2010; 14:00	Russia	6–2 (1–1, 5–0, 0–1)	Finland	Megasport Arena, Moscow; Attendance: 12,850

Game reference

Vasily Koshechkin
Goalies
Iiro Tarkki (out 33:32)
Eera Kilpeläinen (in 33:32)
Referees:
(Czech Republic) Milan Minar
(Czech Republic) Martin Frano
Linesmen:
(Russia) Sergei Shelyanin
(Russia) Dmitri Sivov

A. Radulov - 10:49	1–0
	1–1	15:59 – M. Pyörälä (J. Hytönen, M. Marjamäki)
A. Kaigorodov (D. Zaripov, A. Morozov) (PP) – 22:00	2–1
S. Mozyakin (A. Radulov) – 32:22	3–1
G. Churilov (A. Yemelin, D. Kulyash) – 34:32	4–1
A. Morozov (A. Kaigorodov) (PP) – 38:06	5–1
G. Churilov (PP) – 39:23	6–1
	6–2	54:49 – V. Viitaluoma (M. Nordlund) (PP)

39 min
Penalties
41 min
33
Shots
23

19 December 2010; 18:00	Czech Republic	4–1 (0–1, 2–0, 2–0)	Sweden	Megasport Arena, Moscow; Attendance: 6,850

Game reference

Jakub Štěpánek
Goalies
Stefan Liv
Referees:
(Russia) Konstantin Olenin
(Russia) Alexey Ravodin
Linesmen:
(Russia) Viktor Birin
(Russia) Andrei Putilin

	0–1	10:44 – D. Axelsson (S. Erixon, N. Persson)
J. Klepiš (T. Rolinek, J. Marek) – 26:30	1–1
I. Rachunek (M. Lojek) – 31:34	2–1
T. Rolinek (K. Rachůnek) (PP) – 46:20	3–1
J. Vašíček – 57:14	4–1

12 min
Penalties
10 min
32
Shots
26

== Scoring leaders ==
Pos	Player	Country	GP	G	A	Pts	+/−	PIM	POS
1	Alexei Morozov	Russia	3	2	3	5	0	0	FW
2	Alexander Radulov	Russia	3	2	3	5	+1	4	FW
3	Alexei Kaigorodov	Russia	3	1	4	5	0	2	FW
4	Sergei Mozyakin	Russia	3	2	1	3	+1	0	FW
4	Tomáš Rolinek	Czech Republic	3	2	1	3	+1	0	FW
6	Sebastian Erixon	Sweden	3	2	1	3	0	0	DF
7	Mattias Sjögren	Sweden	3	1	2	3	0	0	FW
8	Danis Zaripov	Russia	3	1	2	3	0	0	FW
9	Niklas Persson	Sweden	3	1	2	3	0	0	FW

GP = Games played; G = Goals; A = Assists; Pts = Points; +/− = Plus/minus; PIM = Penalties in minutes; POS = Position
Source: Swehockey

== Goaltending leaders ==
Pos	Player	Country	TOI	GA	GAA	Sv%	SO
1	Jakub Štěpánek	Czech Republic	184:13	6	1.95	93.68	0
2	Vasily Koshechkin	Russia	120:00	5	2.50	90.00	0
3	Stefan Liv	Sweden	114:49	7	3.66	89.23	0
4	Iiro Tarkki	Finland	98:33	7	4.26	84.09	0
5	Eero Kilpeläinen	Finland	86:28	8	5.55	84.00	0

TOI = Time On Ice (minutes:seconds); SA = Shots against; GA = Goals against; GAA = Goals against average; Sv% = Save percentage; SO = Shutouts
Source: Swehockey

== Tournament awards ==
- Best players selected by the directorate:
  - Best Goaltender: (Russia) Vasiliy Koshechkin
  - Best Defenceman: (Czech Republic) Miroslav Blaťák
  - Best Forward: (Russia) Alexander Radulov
  - Most Valuable Player: (Russia) Aleksei Morozov

== See also ==
- Channel One Cup (ice hockey)
