= 2010 Karjala Tournament =

Tournament details
- Host countries: Finland; Czech Republic
- Cities: Helsinki; České Budějovice
- Venues: 2 (in 2 host cities)
- Dates: 11–14 November 2010
- Teams: 4

Final positions
- Champions: Finland (10th title)
- Runners-up: Russia
- Third place: Sweden
- Fourth place: Czech Republic

Tournament statistics
- Games played: 6
- Goals scored: 27 (4.5 per game)
- Attendance: 55,965 (9,328 per game)
- Scoring leader: (Sweden) Robert Nilsson (5 points)

The 2010 Karjala Tournament was played between 11 and 14 November 2010. The Czech Republic, Finland, Sweden and Russia played a round-robin for a total of three games per team and six games in total. Five matches were played in Hartwall Areena in Helsinki, Finland and one match was played in Budvar Arena in České Budějovice, Czech Republic. The tournament was part of 2010–11 Euro Hockey Tour.

== Standings ==
Pos	Team	Pld	W	OTW	OTL	L	GF	GA	GD	Pts
1	Finland	3	2	0	0	1	9	2	+7	6
2	Russia	3	2	0	0	1	6	4	+2	6
3	Sweden	3	2	0	0	1	8	9	−1	6
4	Czech Republic	3	0	0	0	3	4	12	−8	0

Source: eurohockey

== Games ==
All times local Helsinki – (Eastern European Time – UTC+2) České Budějovicew – (Central European Time – UTC+1)

11 November 2010; 18:10	Czech Republic	3–4 (2–1, 0–0, 1–3)	Sweden	Budvar Arena, České Budějovice; Attendance: 6,421

Jakub Štěpánek
Goalies
Stefan Liv
Referees:
(Russia) Konstantin Olenin
(Russia) Alexey Ravodin

P. Hubáček (J. Novotný, L. Kašpar) – 10:55	1–0
	1–1	14:00 – M. Sjögren (M. Thörnberg)
J. Klepiš – 18:25	2–1
R. Červenka (J. Klepiš) – 40:42	3–1
	3–2	47:16 – R. Nilsson (D. Petrasek, N. Persson)
	3–3	54:35 – R. Nilsson (M. Ekholm, M. Johansson) (PP)
	3–4	54:57 – N. Nordgren (J. Lindström, F. Warg)

8 min
Penalties
8 min
17
Shots
33

11 November 2010; 18:30	Russia	1–0 (0–0, 0–0, 1–0)	Finland	Hartwall Areena, Helsinki; Attendance: 12,385

Vasily Koshechkin	Goalies	Petri Vehanen	Referees: (Sweden) Pehr Claesson (Sweden) Patrik Sjöberg
A. Svitov (S. Mozyakin) – 57:50 / 1–0			Referees: (Sweden) Pehr Claesson (Sweden) Patrik Sjöberg
8 min	Penalties	6 min	Referees: (Sweden) Pehr Claesson (Sweden) Patrik Sjöberg
25	Shots	25	Referees: (Sweden) Pehr Claesson (Sweden) Patrik Sjöberg

13 November 2010; 13:00	Sweden	3–2 (2–1, 1–1, 0–0)	Russia	Hartwall Areena, Helsinki; Attendance: 6,374

Stefan Liv
Goalies
Mikhail Biryukov
Referees:
(Finland) Sami Partanen
(Finland) Jari Leppäalho

R. Nilsson (N. Persson, M. Johansson) (PP) – 02:11	1–0
	1–1	07:24 – D. Kulyash (K. Gorovikov, O. Saprykin)
N. Nordgren (S. Erixon) (PP) – 19:46	2–1
	2–2	27:28 – A. Popov (SH)
B. Melin (N. Persson, M. Johansson) – 28:11	3–2

12 min
Penalties
10 min
37
Shots
26

13 November 2010; 16:30	Finland	5–0 (1–0, 3–0, 1–0)	Czech Republic	Hartwall Areena, Helsinki; Attendance: 12,847

Karri Rämö
Goalies
Jakub Štěpánek (out 30:20)
Marek Schwarz (in 30:20)
Referees:
(Sweden) Pehr Claesson
(Sweden) Patrik Sjöberg

J. Välivaara – 03:49	1–0
J. Immonen (J. Lehterä) – 29:04	2–0
T. Laine (J. Välivaara, J. Lehterä) – 29:30	3–0
J. Lahti (P. Kontiola) – 30:20	4–0
J. Lahti (O. Väänänen, P. Kontiola) – 50:40	5–0

6 min
Penalties
2 min
22
Shots
24

14 November 2010; 12:00	Czech Republic	1–3 (1–2, 0–0, 0–1)	Russia	Hartwall Areena, Helsinki; Attendance: 4,572

Jakub Štěpánek
Goalies
Vasily Koshechkin
Referees:
(Finland) Anssi Salonen
(Finland) Jiri Rönn

	0–1	08:25 – A. Perezhogin (D. Grebeshkov, A. Popov) (PP)
J. Klepiš (M. Škoula, L. Kašpar) (PP) – 13:31	1–1
	1–2	18:36 – D. Grebeshkov (K. Korneyev, M. Afinogenov) (PP)
	1–3	40:27 – A. Kaigorodov

16 min
Penalties
10 min
27
Shots
30

14 November 2010; 17:30	Finland	4–1 (0–0, 0–1, 4–0)	Sweden	Hartwall Areena, Helsinki; Attendance: 13,006

Petri Vehanen
Goalies
Daniel Larsson
Referees:
(Czech Republic) Jan Hribik
(Czech Republic) Antonin Jerabek

	0–1	31:41 – R. Nilsson (N. Persson, B. Melin)
P. Puistola (J. Lehterä, J. Niskala) (PP) – 50:00	1–1
J. Niskala (J. Lahti, J. Välivaara) – 52:04	2–1
J. Immonen (J. Lahti, A. Pihlström) – 56:48	3–1
V. Peltonen – 59:26	4–1

12 min
Penalties
8 min
29
Shots
26

== Scoring leaders ==
Pos	Player	Country	GP	G	A	Pts	+/−	PIM	POS
1	Robert Nilsson	Sweden	3	4	0	4	+1	4	FW
2	Janne Lahti	Finland	3	2	2	4	+3	0	FW
3	Niklas Persson	Sweden	3	0	4	4	+1	0	FW
4	Jakub Klepiš	Czech Republic	3	2	1	3	0	4	FW
5	Jyrki Välivaara	Finland	3	1	2	3	+4	0	DF
6	Magnus Johansson	Sweden	3	0	3	3	−1	0	DF
6	Jori Lehterä	Finland	3	0	3	3	0	0	FW

GP = Games played; G = Goals; A = Assists; Pts = Points; +/− = Plus/minus; PIM = Penalties in minutes; POS = Position
Source: Swehockey

== Goaltending leaders ==
Pos	Player	Country	TOI	GA	GAA	Sv%	SO
1	Vasily Koshechkin	Russia	150:45	1	0.40	98.59	1
2	Petri Vehanen	Finland	108:20	2	1.11	96.08	0
3	Stefan Liv	Sweden	120:00	5	2.50	88.37	0
4	Jakub Štěpánek	Czech Republic	149:52	11	4.40	85.90	0

TOI = Time on ice (minutes:seconds); SA = Shots against; GA = Goals against; GAA = Goals against average; Sv% = Save percentage; SO = Shutouts
Source: Swehockey>

== Tournament awards ==
Best players selected by the directorate:

- Best Goaltender: (Russia) Vasily Koshechkin
- Best Defenceman: (Sweden) Mattias Ekholm
- Best Forward: (Finland) Petri Kontiola

Media All-Star Team:

- Goaltender: (Russia) Vasiliy Koshechkin
- Defence: (Finland) Jyrki Välivaara, (Sweden) Magnus Johansson
- Forwards: (Finland) Janne Lahti, (Finland) Niko Kapanen, (Sweden) Robert Nilsson
