= 2010 Spengler Cup =

2010 Spengler Cup Davos, Switzerland
Tournament details
- Host country: Switzerland
- Venue(s): Vaillant Arena
- Dates: 26–31 December 2010
- Teams: 6

Final positions
- Champions: (Russia) SKA St. Petersburg (4th title)
- Runner-up: Team Canada

Tournament statistics
- Games played: 11
- Goals scored: 61 (5.55 per game)
- Attendance: 67,238 (6,113 per game)
- Scoring leader(s): (Russia) Maxim Sushinskiy (7 pts)

The 2010 Spengler Cup was held in Davos, Switzerland, from 26 to 31 December 2010. All matches were played at host HC Davos's home Vaillant Arena. The number of teams was expanded from five to six in comparison to previous seasons, and split into two groups of three. The two groups, named Torriani and Cattini, were named after legendary Swiss hockey players Bibi Torriani and Hans Cattini.

== Teams participating ==
- Team Canada
- (Switzerland) HC Davos (host)
- (Switzerland) Genève-Servette HC
- (Russia) SKA St. Petersburg
- (Czech Republic) HC Sparta Praha
- (Russia) HC Spartak Moscow

== Group stage ==
=== Key ===
- W (regulation win) – 3 pts.
- OTW (overtime/shootout win) – 2 pts.
- OTL (overtime/shootout loss) – 1 pt.
- L (regulation loss) – 0 pts.

=== Group Torriani ===
Pos	Team	Pld	W	OTW	OTL	L	GF	GA	GD	Pts	Qualification
1	(Russia) SKA St. Petersburg	2	2	0	0	0	7	2	+5	6	Clinched group
2	(Switzerland) Genève-Servette HC	2	1	0	0	1	5	6	−1	3	Quarterfinal berth
3	(Czech Republic) HC Sparta Praha	2	0	0	0	2	4	8	−4	0	Quarterfinal berth

All times are local (UTC+1).

26 December 2010; 15:00	Genève-Servette HC (Switzerland)	1–3 (1–1, 0–0, 0–2)	(Russia) SKA St. Petersburg	Vaillant Arena; Attendance: 6,432

Game reference

Tobias Stephan
Federico Tamo
Goalies
Maxim Sokolov
Jakub Štěpánek
Referees:
(Slovakia) Vladimír Baluška
(Switzerland) Brent Reiber

	0–1	4' – A. Yashin (M. Sushinskiy), T. Mårtensson)
G. Bezina (M. Trachsler, F. Randegger) – 7'	1–1
	1–2	41' – A. Yashin (T. Mårtensson, M. Sushinskiy)
	1–3	58' – T. Mårtensson (M. Sushinskiy, A. Yashin)

6 min
Penalties
10 min

27 December 2010; 15:00	HC Sparta Praha (Czech Republic)	3–4 (0–0, 2–2, 1–2)	(Switzerland) Genève-Servette HC	Vaillant Arena; Attendance: 5,782

Game reference

Tomáš Pöpperle
Goalies
Tobias Stephan
Referees:
(Slovakia) Vladimir Baluska
(Canada) Ghislain Hébert

T. Kůrka (D. Výborný) – 30'	1–0
	1–1	34' – F. Randegger (J. Hennessy)
	1–2	37' – D. Fritsche (G. Bezina, R. Park) (PP)
Y. Treille – 40'	2–2
(PP) F. Du Bois (P. Ton, (O. Kratěna) – 42'	3–2
	3–3	45' – J. Hennessy (T. Savary) (PP)
	3–4	47' – T. Savary (T. Salmelainen)

8 min
Penalties
8 min

28 December 2010; 15:00	SKA St. Petersburg (Russia)	4–1 (2–1, 1–0, 1–0)	(Czech Republic) HC Sparta Praha	Vaillant Arena; Attendance: 6,148

Game reference

Jakub Štěpánek
Goalies
Thomas Bäumle
Referees:
(Switzerland) Danny Kurmann
(Switzerland) Brent Reiber

	0–1	14' – P. Kafka (M. Bartánus)
T. Mårtensson (A. Yashin) – 18'	1–1
M. Rybin (SH) – 18'	2–1
G. Klimenko (A. Semenov) – 31'	3–1
M. Weinhandl (A. Yashin, M. Sushinskiy) (PP) – 54'	4–1

18 min
Penalties
10 min

=== Group Cattini ===
Pos	Team	Pld	W	OTW	OTL	L	GF	GA	GD	Pts	Qualification
1	(Switzerland) HC Davos	2	2	0	0	0	7	4	+3	6	Clinched group
2	Team Canada	2	1	0	0	1	8	4	+4	3	Quarterfinal berth
3	(Russia) HC Spartak Moscow	2	0	0	0	2	3	10	−7	0	Quarterfinal berth

All times are local (UTC+1).

26 December 2010; 20:15	HC Davos (Switzerland)	4–2 (2–0, 0–2, 2–0)	(Russia) HC Spartak Moscow	Vaillant Arena; Attendance: 6,432

Game reference

Leonardo Genoni
Reto Berra
Goalies
Alexey Yakhin
Dominik Hašek
Referees:
(Canada) Ghislain Hébert
(Switzerland) Danny Kurmann

R. von Arx (P. Guggisberg, P. Tatíček) – 6'	1–0
R. von Arx (P. Tatíček) – 11'	2–0
	2–1	27' – S. Ružička (B. Radivojevič, G. Zheldakov) (SH)
	2–2	32' – K. Knyazev (M. Ryazanov, Y. Lapenkov)
P. Sýkora (B. Forster, R. von Arx) (PP) – 48'	3–2
P. Tatíček (P. Guggisberg, R. von Arx) – 54'	4–2

12 min
Penalties
16 min

27 December 2010; 20:15	Team Canada	6–1 (0–0, 3–0, 3–1)	(Russia) HC Spartak Moscow	Vaillant Arena; Attendance: 6,432

Game reference

Jeff Deslauriers
Goalies
Dominik Hašek
Referees:
(Switzerland) Brent Reiber
(Canada) Stéphane Rochette

M. Kariya (Cu. Murphy, J. Kwiatkowski) (PP) – 22'	1–0
Y. Lehoux (G. Metropolit) (PP) – 34'	2–0
M. Dupont (T. Roche) (PP) – 35'	3–0
E. Landry (J. Kwiatkowski, B. Brooks) – 47'	4–0
J. Holden (S. Aubin) – 56'	5–0
	5–1	57' – M. Yunkov (R. Lyuduchin, A Suglobov)
G. Metropolit (M. Dupont, B. McLean) – 57'	6–1

18 min
Penalties
16 min

28 December 2010; 20:15	HC Davos (Switzerland)	3–2 (1–0, 2–2, 0–0)	Team Canada	Vaillant Arena; Attendance: 6,432

Game reference

Reto Berra
Goalies
Jeff Deslauriers
Referees:
(Slovakia) Vladimír Baluška
(Canada) Stéphane Rochette

S. Rizzi (D. Wieser, R. von Arx) – 2'	1–0
	1–1	22' – Y. Lehoux (B. McLean) (PP)
P. Tatíček (P. Guggisberg) – 24'	2–1
G. Sciaroni (P. Sýkora) – 31'	3–1
	3–2	35' – T. Roche (Y. Lehoux) (PP)

14 min
Penalties
16 min

== Knockout stage ==
Quarterfinals
A2	(Switzerland) Genève-Servette HC	2
B3	(Russia) HC Spartak Moscow	0
B2	Team Canada	4*
A3	(Czech Republic) HC Sparta Praha	3

Semifinals
A1	(Russia) SKA St. Petersburg	4*
A2	(Switzerland) Genève-Servette HC	3
B1	(Switzerland) HC Davos	0
B2	Team Canada	4

Final
A1	(Russia) SKA St. Petersburg	4
B2	Team Canada	3

Key: * – final in overtime. ** – final in shootout.

=== Quarterfinals ===
All times are local (UTC+1).

29 December 2010; 15:00	Genève-Servette HC (Switzerland)	2–0 (2–0, 0–0, 0–0)	(Russia) HC Spartak Moscow	Vaillant Arena; Attendance: 5,355

Game reference
Tobias Stephan	Goalies	Dominik Hašek	Referees: (Canada) Ghislain Hébert (Canada) Stéphane Rochette
D. Fritsche (J. Toms, R. Park) – 11' / 1–0; R. Park (B. Pothier, J. Toms) (PP) – 18' / 2–0			Referees: (Canada) Ghislain Hébert (Canada) Stéphane Rochette
16 min	Penalties	16 min	Referees: (Canada) Ghislain Hébert (Canada) Stéphane Rochette

29 December 2010; 20:15	Team Canada	4–3 OT (1–0, 2–3, 0–0, 1–0)	(Czech Republic) HC Sparta Praha	Vaillant Arena; Attendance: 5,574

Game reference

Jeff Deslauriers
Goalies
Tomáš Pöpperle
Referees:
(Slovakia) Vladimír Baluška
(Switzerland) Danny Kurmann

J. Vigier (G. Metropolit, Co. Murphy) – 11'	1–0
D. Pittis (M. Bell, M. Dupont) (PP) – 22'	2–0
	2–1	28' – E. Peter (R. Smoleňák, T. Kůrka)
B. Bell (G. Metropolit, B. McLean) – 32'	3–1
	3–2	34' – E. Peter (R. Smoleňák, P. Macholda)
	3–3	37' – D. Výborný (J. Hanzlík, P. Macholda) (PP)
M. Dupont (Co. Murphy) (PP) – 64' (OT)	4–3

8 min
Penalties
10 min

=== Semifinals ===
All times are local (UTC+1).

30 December 2010; 15:00	SKA St. Petersburg (Russia)	4–3 OT (0–3, 3–0, 0–0, 1–0)	(Switzerland) Genève-Servette HC	Vaillant Arena; Attendance: 6,015

Game reference

Maxim Sokolov
Jakub Štěpánek
Goalies
Tobias Stephan
Referees:
(Canada) Ghislain Hébert
(Switzerland) Brent Reiber

	0–1	11' – R. Park (G. Bezina) (PP)
	0–2	14' – J. Toms (R. Park)
	0–3	18' – T. Déruns (P. Savary)
J. Franssen – 24'	1–3
D. Denisov (A. But) – 26'	2–3
T. Mårtensson (PP) – 36'	3–3
A. But – 62' (OT)	4–3

12 min
Penalties
8 min

30 December 2010; 20:15	HC Davos (Switzerland)	0–4 (0–1, 0–2, 0–1)	Team Canada	Vaillant Arena; Attendance: 6,432

Game reference

Leonardo Genoni
Goalies
Jeff Deslauriers
Referees:
(Switzerland) Danny Kurmann
(Canada) Stéphane Rochette

0–1	15' – J. Holden (B. Down)
0–2	37' – M. Bell (G. Metropolit, D. Pittis)
0–3	38' – J. Vigier
0–4	50' – P. Pelletier (J. Vigier, D. Westcott) (SH)

10 min
Penalties
12 min

=== Final ===
All times are local (UTC+1).

31 December 2010; 12:00	SKA St. Petersburg (Russia)	4–3 (1–0, 2–1, 1–2)	Team Canada	Vaillant Arena; Attendance: 6,432

Game reference

Jakub Štěpánek
Goalies
Jeff Deslauriers
Referees:
(Slovakia) Vladimír Baluška
(Canada) Ghislain Hébert

M. Sushinskiy (T. Mårtensson) – 11'	1–0
	1–1	27' – M. Dupont (D. Pittis)
A. Yashin (M. Sushinskiy, M. Weinhandl) (PP) – 31'	2–1
M. Afinogenov (E. Artyukhin, J. Fransson) – 35'	3–1
	3–2	59' – B. McLean (M. Iggulden, B. Bell) (PP)
M. Sushinskiy (ENG) – 59'	4–2
	4–3	60' – J. Holden (B. McLean)

12 min
Penalties
12 min

== Champions ==
2010 Spengler Cup Winners
(Russia)
SKA St. Petersburg
Fourth title

== All-Star Team ==
Position	Player	Nationality	Team
Goaltender	Jeff Deslauriers	(Canada) Canadian	Team Canada
Right Defender	Travis Roche	(Canada) Canadian	Team Canada
Left Defender	Goran Bezina	(Croatia) Croatian	(Switzerland) Genève-Servette HC
Right Wing	Dan Fritsche	(United States) American	(Switzerland) Genève-Servette HC
Center	Reto von Arx	(Switzerland) Swiss	(Switzerland) HC Davos
Left Wing	Alexei Yashin	(Russia) Russian	(Russia) SKA St. Petersburg

== Statistics ==
=== Scoring leaders ===
Player	Team	GP	G	A	Pts
(Russia) Maxim Sushinskiy	SKA St. Petersburg	4	2	5	7
(Sweden) Tony Mårtensson	SKA St. Petersburg	4	3	3	6
(Russia) Alexei Yashin	SKA St. Petersburg	4	3	3	6
(Canada) Micki Dupont	Team Canada	5	3	2	5
(United States) Richard Park	Genève-Servette HC	4	2	3	5

== Television ==
Several television channels around the world covered many or all matches of the Spengler Cup. As well as most Swiss channels, here is a listing of who else covered the tournament:

- Schweizer Fernsehen (Switzerland, host broadcaster)
- The Sports Network, which covered the tournament for the first time. The games had been televised in Canada most recently by Rogers Sportsnet.
- Fox Sports Middle East Limited (Czech Republic)
- VGTRK (Russia)
- Eurosport 1, Eurosport 2, British Eurosport, Eurosport Asia and Pacific, and Eurosport HD
