= Rozanov =

Rozanov (Russian: Розанов) is a Russian masculine surname; its feminine counterpart is Rozanova. It may refer to:

- Ilya Rozanov (born 1991), fictional Russian hockey player
- Irina Rozanova (born 1961), Russian actress
- Maria Rozanova (1929-2023), Russian publisher and editor
- Olga Rozanova (1886–1918), Russian avant-garde artist
- Rosa Rosanova (1869–1944), Russian-American actress
- Sergei Rozanov (1870–1937), Russian clarinetist
- Vasily Rozanov (1856–1919), Russian writer and philosopher

== See also ==
- Ryazanov
