= Martin Nečas =

Czech ice hockey player (born 1999)

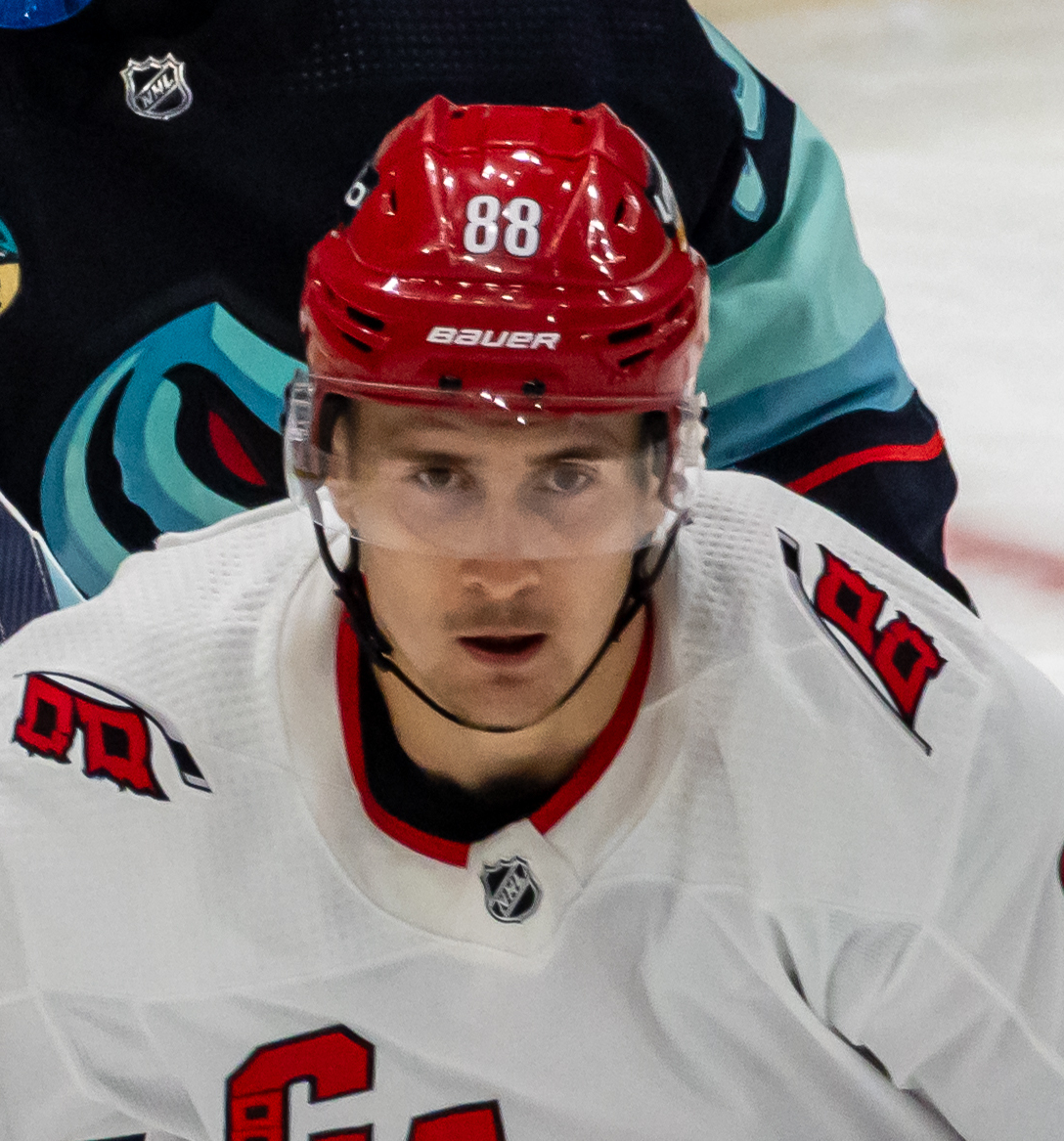
- Nečas in 2023
- Born: 15 January 1999 (age 27) Nové Město na Moravě, Czech Republic
- Height: 6 ft 3 in (191 cm)
- Weight: 195 lb (88 kg; 13 st 13 lb)
- Position: Forward
- Shoots: Right
- NHL team Former teams: Colorado Avalanche; Kometa Brno; Carolina Hurricanes
- National team: Czech Republic
- NHL draft: 12th overall, 2017; Carolina Hurricanes
- Playing career: 2017–present

Martin Nečas (Czech pronunciation: [ˈmarcɪn ˈnɛtʃas]; born 15 January 1999) is a Czech professional ice hockey player who is a forward for the Colorado Avalanche of the National Hockey League (NHL).

Nečas made his professional debut with Kometa Brno in 2016, and played a prominent role on the team as they won the Czech Extraliga championship. Regarded as a top prospect for the 2017 NHL entry draft, he was selected 12th overall by the Carolina Hurricanes, and made his NHL debut in 2017. At the international level, Nečas represents the Czech Republic. After making his NHL debut, he was returned on loan to Kometa Brno, helping the team win the Czech Extraliga championship for a second year in a row.

== Playing career ==
=== Junior ===
In 2012, Nečas participated in the Quebec International Pee-Wee Hockey Tournament with a youth team from Chomutov. A standout junior player, Nečas led the Czech under-16 league in scoring in 2014–15 with 91 points in 34 games, split between the junior teams of Žďár nad Sázavou and Kometa Brno. His production decreased in 2015–16 due to missing games from injuries and illness, appearing in only 18 games, with nine goals and 21 assists.

At the conclusion of the 2016–17 Czech Extraliga season and prior to the start of the playoffs for Kometa Brno, Nečas was loaned to Horácká Slavia Třebíč of the 1st Czech Republic Hockey League, the second level of Czech ice hockey, for their playoff series, playing in their final game. Nečas appeared in 41 games for Brno during the 2016–17 season, recording 15 points. During the play-offs, he scored another four goals in 10 games, second best on the team, and helped Brno reach the final. However, Nečas did not play in the final as he was instead sent to the 2017 World U18 Championships; Brno ultimately won the championship.

When the NHL Central Scouting Bureau released its mid-term rankings of eligible prospects for the 2017 NHL entry draft, Nečas was listed as the fifth-best international skater. He maintained this position on the final list released after the end of the 2016–17 NHL regular season. Scouts considered him an undersized forward, but smart and someone who has good offensive instincts and a strong skater. Following his selection by the Hurricanes, 12th overall, Nečas was later signed to a three-year, entry-level contract with Carolina on 15 July 2017.

=== NHL ===
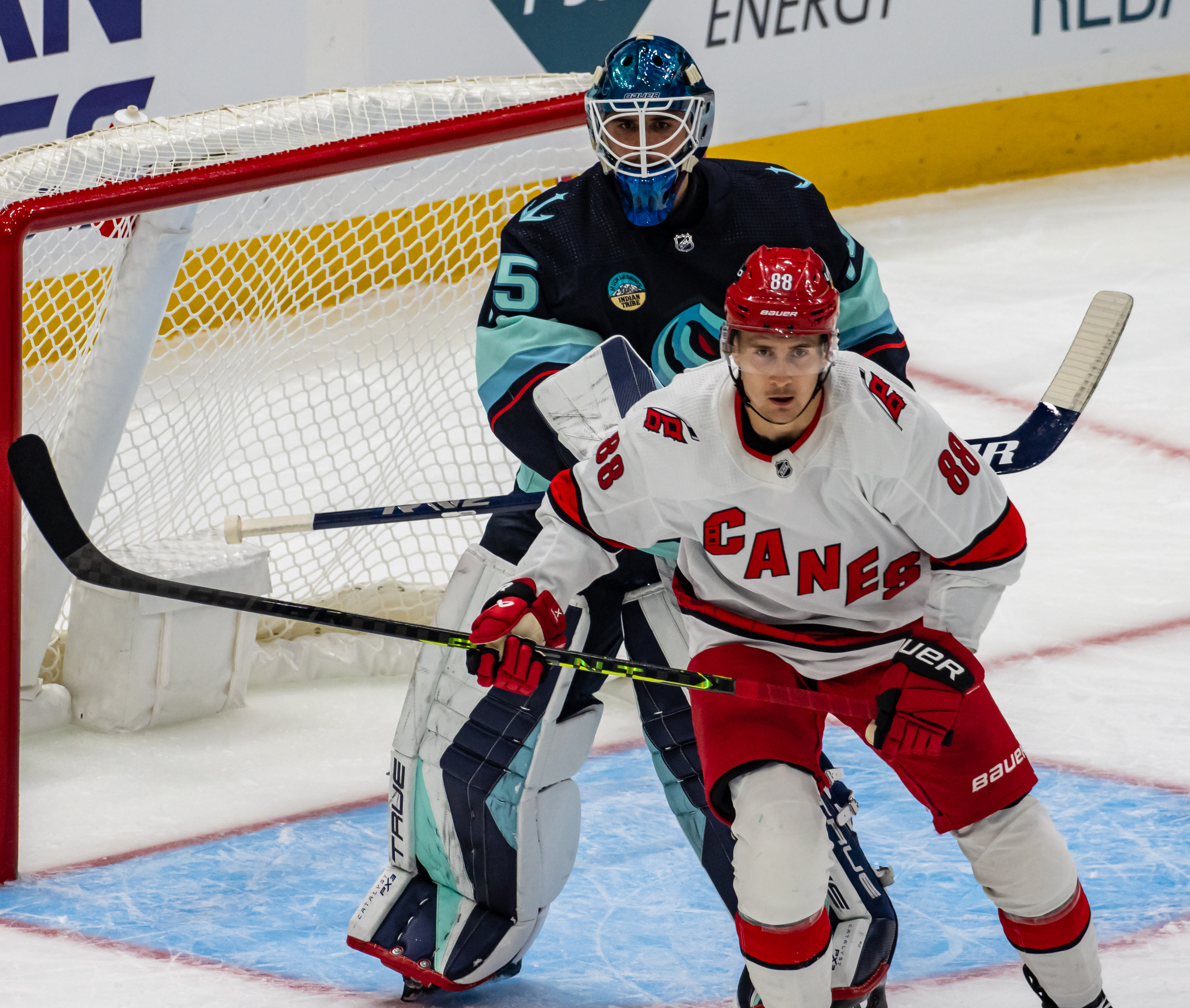
Nečas during a game against the Seattle Kraken in 2023.

Initially it was expected that Nečas would not join the Hurricanes immediately, and instead was expected to either return to the Czech Republic, or play for the Hurricanes' American Hockey League (AHL) affiliate, the Charlotte Checkers, or the Saginaw Spirit of the Ontario Hockey League (OHL), who selected him in the CHL Import Draft in 2017. His play during Hurricanes' training camp, where he demonstrated his skill, earned him a roster spot. The decision to keep Nečas with the team was aided due both to an injury to veteran Lee Stempniak, and that Nečas could play up to nine regular season games in the NHL before it counted against one year of his contract. Despite being named to the roster, Nečas was a healthy scratch and only practiced with the team, and his NHL debut came 17 October 2017, in a 5–3 victory against the Edmonton Oilers. Nečas remained on the Hurricanes roster until 23 October, though did not appear in any more games, when he was returned on loan to continue his development in Brno. Nečas had 17 points in 24 games, leading junior-aged players in scoring, and helped Brno win the Czech Extraliga championship for a second year in a row.

Nečas started the 2018–19 season with the Hurricanes in the NHL. On 16 October 2018, he recorded his first NHL goal on a pass from fellow rookie Warren Foegele in a 4–2 loss against Tampa Bay Lightning. After seven games with the Hurricanes, where he had one goal and one assist, Nečas was assigned to Hurricanes' AHL affiliate, the Charlotte Checkers.

Considered the top prospect in Carolina's system going into the 2019–20 season, Nečas was named to the team for the start of the season. On 3 October 2019, he scored a power play goal in the season-opening 4–3 shootout victory against the Montreal Canadiens. On 9 August 2022, Nečas was re-signed to a two-year contract extension until the end of the 2023–24 season. In the first year of the extension, during the 2022–23 season, Nečas led the Hurricanes with 71 points. On 29 July 2024, after the player and team engaged in a dispute over the value of a contract extension, the Hurricanes re-signed Nečas to a two-year bridge contract worth $6.5 million annually.

Nečas started off the 2024–25 season at a hot pace; by 26 November, he was leading the entire league in scoring with 35 points in 21 games and cited as a potential Art Ross Trophy winner, despite his scoring slowing down during December and January.

==== Colorado Avalanche (2025–present) ====
On 24 January 2025, the Hurricanes traded Nečas, Jack Drury, a 2025 second-round pick, and a 2026 fourth-round pick to the Colorado Avalanche. The Hurricanes received Mikko Rantanen from the Avalanche and Taylor Hall from the Chicago Blackhawks. The Blackhawks re-acquired their 2025 third-round pick from Carolina as compensation for retaining 50% of Rantanen's remaining contract. During Colorado's first-round match-up against the Dallas Stars, Nečas had one goal and four assists before the Avalanche were eliminated in seven games.

During the 2025–26 season, Nečas set a new career-high in goals when he scored his 29th goal of the season during a 6 March 2026 game against the Dallas Stars. He eclipsed his previous career-high in assists after he assisted on a goal by Artturi Lehkonen during the third period of a game against the Calgary Flames on 30 March. He reached the 100 point mark for the first time when he assisted on an empty net goal by Nathan MacKinnon during an April 14 game against the Calgary Flames.

== International play ==
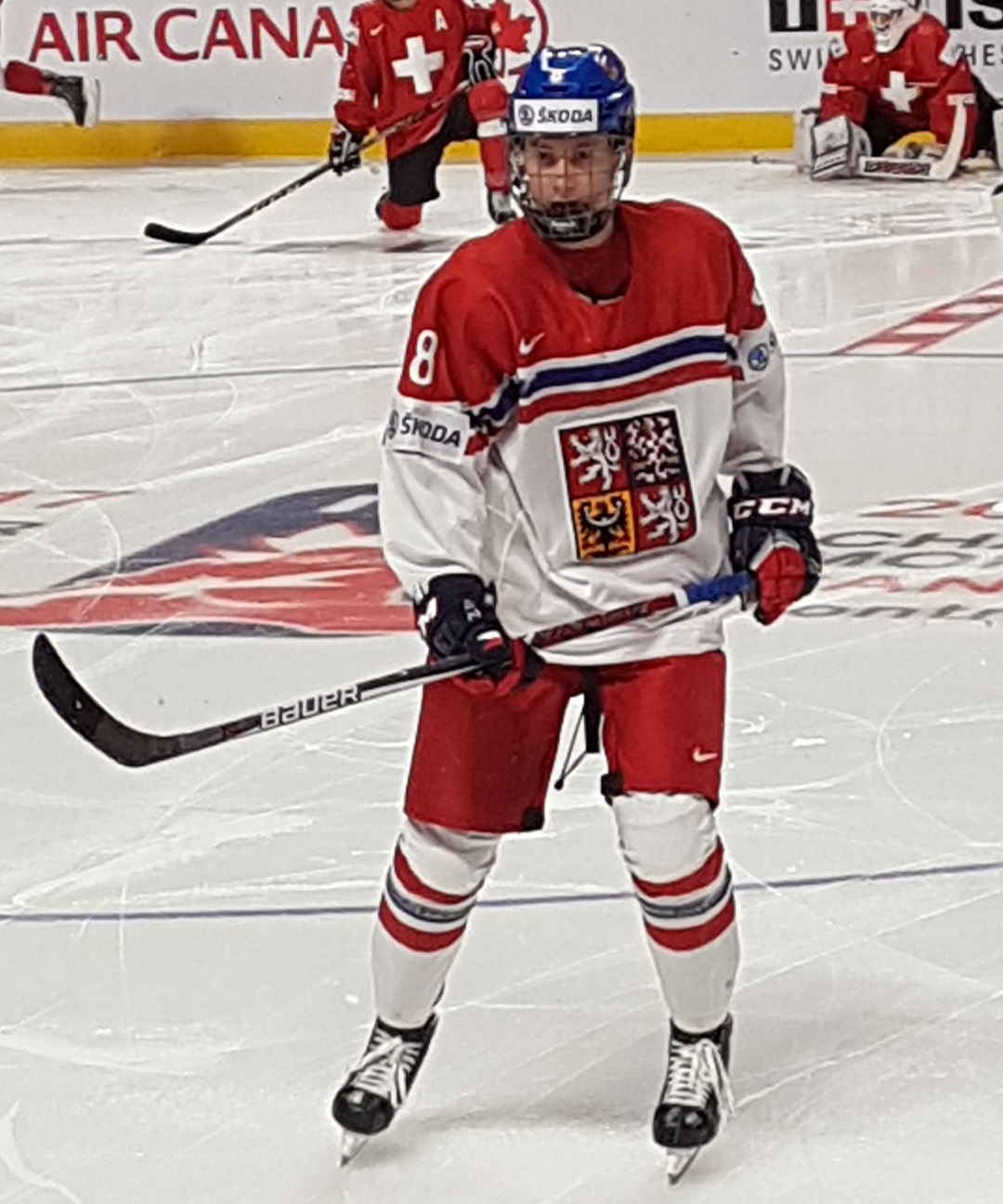
- Nečas at the 2017 World Junior Championships

Medal record

Men's ice hockey

Representing the Czech Republic

World Championships
| Gold medal – first place | 2024 Czech Republic | |

Ivan Hlinka Memorial Tournament
| Gold medal – first place | 2016 Czech Republic/Slovakia | |

Nečas first played internationally with the Czech Republic under-17 team at the 2015 World U-17 Hockey Challenge, where he served as captain and recorded five points in five games, leading his team in scoring. He again was captain for the Czech Republic team at the 2016 Ivan Hlinka Memorial Tournament, an invitational tournament, where he finished seventh overall in scoring with six points in four games, helping the team win gold. He later made his debut in the 2017 World Junior Championships, where he had three points for the Czech Republic junior team. Nečas also participated at the 2017 World U18 Championships, serving as captain of the team, and had three assists in five games as the Czech Republic team lost in the quarterfinals.

Nečas led the 2018 World Junior Championships with eight assists and tied for the scoring lead (with Casey Mittelstadt of the United States) with 11 points, helping the team to a fourth-place finish. He was later named to the Czech Republic senior team for the 2018 World Championship, finishing with five points in seven games. The Hurricanes lent Nečas to the 2019 World Junior Championships, where he served as captain of the Czech Republic team. Nečas represented the Czech Republic senior team at the 2024 World Championship and won a gold medal.

== Personal life ==
Nečas' father, also named Martin, serves as coach of third-tier Czech ice hockey club SKLH Žďár nad Sázavou.

== Career statistics ==
=== Regular season and playoffs ===
| | | | Regular season | | | | | Playoffs |
| Season | Team | League | GP | G | A | Pts | PIM | GP | G | A | Pts | PIM |
|---|---|---|---|---|---|---|---|---|---|---|---|---|
| 2013–14 | Žďár nad Sázavou | Czech.16 | 36 | 29 | 29 | 58 | 14 | — | — | — | — | — |
| 2014–15 | Žďár nad Sázavou | Czech.16 | 25 | 24 | 47 | 71 | 10 | — | — | — | — | — |
| 2014–15 | Kometa Brno | Czech.16 | 9 | 8 | 12 | 20 | 4 | 4 | 4 | 5 | 9 | 2 |
| 2014–15 | Kometa Brno | Czech.18 | 4 | 1 | 2 | 3 | 4 | — | — | — | — | — |
| 2015–16 | Kometa Brno | Czech.18 | 18 | 9 | 21 | 30 | 14 | 10 | 4 | 11 | 15 | 6 |
| 2016–17 | Kometa Brno | Czech.20 | 1 | 1 | 2 | 3 | 4 | — | — | — | — | — |
| 2016–17 | Kometa Brno | ELH | 41 | 7 | 8 | 15 | 6 | 10 | 4 | 0 | 4 | 8 |
| 2016–17 | Horácká Slavia Třebíč | Czech.2 | — | — | — | — | — | 1 | 0 | 0 | 0 | 0 |
| 2017–18 | Carolina Hurricanes | NHL | 1 | 0 | 0 | 0 | 0 | — | — | — | — | — |
| 2017–18 | Kometa Brno | ELH | 24 | 9 | 8 | 17 | 6 | 14 | 4 | 5 | 9 | 6 |
| 2018–19 | Carolina Hurricanes | NHL | 7 | 1 | 1 | 2 | 2 | — | — | — | — | — |
| 2018–19 | Charlotte Checkers | AHL | 64 | 16 | 36 | 52 | 36 | 18 | 5 | 8 | 13 | 6 |
| 2019–20 | Carolina Hurricanes | NHL | 64 | 16 | 20 | 36 | 20 | 8 | 1 | 3 | 4 | 0 |
| 2020–21 | Carolina Hurricanes | NHL | 53 | 14 | 27 | 41 | 10 | 11 | 2 | 3 | 5 | 0 |
| 2021–22 | Carolina Hurricanes | NHL | 78 | 14 | 26 | 40 | 32 | 14 | 0 | 5 | 5 | 0 |
| 2022–23 | Carolina Hurricanes | NHL | 82 | 28 | 43 | 71 | 32 | 15 | 4 | 3 | 7 | 2 |
| 2023–24 | Carolina Hurricanes | NHL | 77 | 24 | 29 | 53 | 42 | 11 | 4 | 5 | 9 | 0 |
| 2024–25 | Carolina Hurricanes | NHL | 49 | 16 | 39 | 55 | 10 | — | — | — | — | — |
| 2024–25 | Colorado Avalanche | NHL | 30 | 11 | 17 | 28 | 6 | 7 | 1 | 4 | 5 | 0 |
| 2025–26 | Colorado Avalanche | NHL | 78 | 38 | 62 | 100 | 30 | 13 | 1 | 12 | 13 | 6 |
| ELH totals | | | 65 | 16 | 16 | 32 | 12 | 24 | 8 | 5 | 13 | 14 |
| NHL totals | | | 519 | 162 | 264 | 426 | 184 | 79 | 13 | 35 | 48 | 8 |

=== International ===
| Year | Team | Event | Result | GP | G | A | Pts | PIM |
|---|---|---|---|---|---|---|---|---|
| 2015 | Czech Republic | U17 | 7th | 5 | 4 | 1 | 5 | 4 |
| 2016 | Czech Republic | IH18 | 1st place, gold medalist(s) | 4 | 2 | 4 | 6 | 2 |
| 2017 | Czech Republic | WJC | 6th | 5 | 1 | 2 | 3 | 2 |
| 2017 | Czech Republic | U18 | 7th | 5 | 0 | 3 | 3 | 4 |
| 2018 | Czech Republic | WJC | 4th | 7 | 3 | 8 | 11 | 0 |
| 2018 | Czech Republic | WC | 7th | 7 | 3 | 2 | 5 | 0 |
| 2019 | Czech Republic | WJC | 7th | 5 | 1 | 3 | 4 | 18 |
| 2024 | Czechia | WC | 1st place, gold medalist(s) | 5 | 1 | 6 | 7 | 2 |
| 2025 | Czechia | WC | 6th | 7 | 3 | 4 | 7 | 4 |
| 2026 | Czechia | OG | 8th | 5 | 3 | 5 | 8 | 2 |
| Junior totals | | | | 31 | 11 | 21 | 32 | 30 |
| Senior totals | | | | 24 | 10 | 17 | 27 | 8 |

== Awards and honours ==
| Award | Year | Ref |
Czech Republic
| Golden Hockey Stick | 2026 | |
ELH
| Rookie of the Year | 2017 | |
| Champion | 2017, 2018 | |
| Zlatá helma Sencor (MVP) | 2018 | |
AHL
| Calder Cup champion | 2019 | |
International
| World Junior Championship Top 3 Player on Team | 2018 | |

Awards and achievements
| Preceded by Julien Gauthier | Carolina Hurricanes first-round draft pick 2017 | Succeeded by Andrei Svechnikov |
