= Yakhin =

Yakhin (Russian: Яхин) is a Tatar masculine surname originating from the Arabic given name Yahya, its feminine counterpart is Yakhina. It may refer to:

- Alexei Yakhin (born 1984), Russian ice hockey goaltender
- Guzel Yakhina (born 1977), Russian author and screenwriter
- Röstäm Yaxin (1921–1993), Tatar composer and pianist
