= Rezanov =

Rezanov (Russian: Резанов) is a Russian masculine surname, its feminine counterpart is Rezanova. It may refer to

- Mylene Paat-Reznova, Filipino volleyball player
- Nikolai Rezanov (1764–1807), Russian nobleman and statesman
- Oleksandr Rezanov (born 1948), Soviet/Ukrainian handball player
- Viktor Reznov, a character from Call of Duty: World at War and Call of Duty: Black Ops

== See also ==
- Ryazanov
