= Miloš Novák =

Czech ice hockey player (1952–2021)

- Born: 5 June 1952; Czechoslovakia
- Died: 26 February 2021 (aged 68)
- Position: Forward
- Extraliga team: HC Dukla Jihlava
- Played for: HC Dukla Jihlava; SKLH Žďár nad Sázavou
- Playing career: 1970–1983

Miloš Novák (5 June 1952 – 26 February 2021) was a Czech ice hockey player who played at the forward position.

== Playing career ==
For the majority of his career, Novák played for HC Dukla Jihlava of the Czechoslovak Extraliga, with whom he won 4 championships. He represented Czechoslovakia at the 1971 IIHF European U19 Championship, where the team won the bronze medal. In the final year of his career, he played for SKLH Žďár nad Sázavou.

For the 1977–78 WHA season, he played 7 games for the Czechoslovakia All-Stars in the World Hockey Association. He recorded 2 assists and 6 penalty minutes.

== Biography ==
Miloš Novák died on 26 February 2021 at the age of 68.
