= Mark Bell (ice hockey) =

Canadian ice hockey player and coach

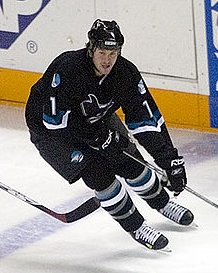
- Born: August 5, 1980 (age 46) St. Pauls, Ontario, Canada
- Height: 6 ft 3 in (191 cm)
- Weight: 220 lb (100 kg; 15 st 10 lb)
- Position: Left wing
- Shot: Left
- Played for: Chicago Blackhawks; Trondheim Black Panthers; San Jose Sharks; Toronto Maple Leafs; Kloten Flyers; Anaheim Ducks; Iserlohn Roosters; Eisbären Berlin
- NHL draft: 8th overall, 1998; Chicago Blackhawks
- Playing career: 2000–2016

Mark Bell (born August 5, 1980) is a Canadian ice hockey coach and a former professional ice hockey forward. Bell was selected by the Chicago Blackhawks in the first round (8th overall) of the 1998 NHL entry draft. In the NHL, Bell played for the Blackhawks, San Jose Sharks, Toronto Maple Leafs, and Anaheim Ducks. Later in his career, he played in Switzerland and Germany.

== Playing career ==
Bell started playing hockey at the age of four years, and grew up admiring Wayne Gretzky and Doug Gilmour. He played four seasons in the minor Ontario Hockey League with the Ottawa 67's, and was part of the Memorial Cup championship in 1998–99. Bell was a bronze medalist with Team Canada at the 2000 World Junior Hockey Championships.

=== Chicago Blackhawks ===
He was drafted by the Chicago Blackhawks in the 1998 NHL entry draft as the eighth overall pick. He scored his first goal against Patrick Roy. Bell's time with Chicago was moderately successful, forming a partnership with fellow Tyler Arnason and Kyle Calder on a line nicknamed the "ABC line". The trio were considered the future for a rebuilding Blackhawks team, but never met expectations and in 2006, both Bell and Calder would be traded away. During the 2004–05 NHL lockout, Bell played with the Trondheim Black Panthers in the Norwegian UPC-ligaen, recording 16 goals and 39 points in 36 games. He scored 72 goals and 151 points in 339 games with the Blackhawks and 25 goals and 48 points in his final year.

=== San Jose Sharks ===
In the summer of 2006, Bell was traded to the San Jose Sharks in a three-way deal involving Chicago and the Ottawa Senators Bell signed a three-year US$6.5 million contract July 2006. Prior to the start of training camp, Bell was arrested and charged after being in a collision while driving under the influence (DUI). He was initially placed on a line with Joe Thornton and Jonathan Cheechoo in his first year, but broke a bone in his wrist in the second game of the regular season. Bell never lived up to expectations and could not duplicate the numbers that he put up in Chicago scoring only 11 times and accumulating 21 points in 71 games and was often a healthy scratch in the playoffs.

=== Toronto Maple Leafs ===
Bell was acquired by the Toronto Maple Leafs along with Vesa Toskala via trade at the 2007 NHL entry draft on June 22, 2007 for three draft picks. After becoming part of the Leafs, Bell was then suspended the first 15 games for his DUI conviction. He was reinstated by the NHL and was eligible to play his first game for the Maple Leafs on November 6, 2007. He played just 35 games with the Maple Leafs, suffering a facial fracture that required surgery and was unable to regain his form. The following year, he failed to break into the team during training camp and on October 6, 2008, Bell was placed on waivers which cleared the way for him being assigned to Toronto's AHL affiliate, the Toronto Marlies.

=== New York Rangers ===
On February 25, 2009, Bell was placed on re-entry waivers by the Maple Leafs and was claimed by the New York Rangers. He was then assigned to the Rangers' AHL team, the Hartford Wolf Pack to make room for fellow waiver claim Sean Avery who had been claimed from the Dallas Stars. He was not re-signed at the end of the season.

=== Switzerland ===
He was invited to Philadelphia Flyers training camp on a professional tryout on September 2. Bell was released from camp on September 22 after refusing to sign a two-way contract to play in the AHL. On September 28, 2009 he signed with Nationalliga A club Kloten Flyers in Switzerland. He played 108 games in two seasons with Kloten. During his time in Switzerland, Bell played for Team Canada at the 2009 and 2010 Spengler Cups.

=== Anaheim Ducks ===
On July 20, 2011, Bell signed a one-year two-way contract to return to North America with the Anaheim Ducks of the NHL. He was invited to the Ducks' training camp, but was assigned to Anaheim's AHL affiliate, the Syracuse Crunch on September 25, 2011. On January 20, 2012, Bell was recalled from Syracuse. After five games with the Ducks, in which he was scoreless, he was reassigned to the Crunch for the remainder of the season.

=== Germany ===
On September 19, 2012, Bell ventured to Europe signing a one-year deal with the Iserlohn Roosters of the German DEL. After not being able to renegotiate his contract with the Roosters, Bell signed with the Eisbären Berlin prior to the 2013–14 season. In the late stages of the 2014–15 season, Bell sustained a concussion which sidelined him for a while, followed by a long-term ankle injury. These health issues kept him from playing for almost one year, he made his comeback in late January 2016. At the end of the 2015–16 season, Bell retired from professional ice hockey.

== Coaching career ==
In July 2016, Bell joined the coaching staff of the St. Marys Jr. ‘B’ Lincolns as an assistant.

== Legal trouble ==
During the 2006 Labor Day weekend, in Milpitas, California, Bell's rented Toyota Camry was traveling an estimated 100 kilometres per hour (62 mph) when it rear-ended a pickup truck at a stop sign driven by Jose Luis Villafana, the latter's vehicle being hit 15 metres (49 ft) up a steep hill and wrapped it around a telephone pole. The victim was uninsured and unlicensed and suffered multiple head, back and leg injuries in the crash. Bell was arrested shortly after walking away from the accident. He blew .201 in a breathalyzer test about a half-hour after the accident, and a blood test revealed a blood-alcohol level of 0.15, considerably higher than the legal limit of 0.08.

Bell was charged with hit and run and driving under the influence. Both are felony offences. His arraignment was set for January 3, 2007. Bell pleaded no contest to drunk driving causing injury and hit-and-run on August 14, 2007. Prior to sentencing, Bell had to pay restitution, including medical bills and the cost of the vehicle to Villafana, who has also filed a civil suit seeking "unlimited damages" which was later settled out of court. He was to serve six months in jail after completing the 2007–08 hockey season but later told to work in a California jail which he did from June 2, 2008 to August 15, 2008.

In addition to his conviction, Bell was placed in Stage 2 of the NHL/NHLPA Substance Abuse Program and was suspended for 15 games without pay by the NHL on September 12, 2007. NHL commissioner Gary Bettman justified the suspension, saying "Playing in the National Hockey League is a privilege, and with that privilege comes a corresponding responsibility for exemplary conduct off the ice as well as on it". The NHLPA disagreed, saying "there is no legitimate purpose served by adding a substantial league disciplinary suspension to the severe sanctions that have already been imposed". Leafs general manager John Ferguson, Jr., who drew criticism for the trade, had anticipated that Bell would face some sort of suspension, however based upon past precedent they did not expect it to be so lengthy. This had been suggested as a sign that the NHL was imposing stricter discipline for off-ice antics of players, after Michael Vick was expelled from the NFL as a result of his conviction for running a dog-fighting ring.

Bell has stated that as a result of the accident, realizing that his career was slipping away because of his irresponsibility, he had changed his lifestyle and had been sober since then, saying "Now, every day I wake up I realize I'm living a dream. It's taken a while for me to understand that. Now that I have, I'm going to grab it. My fun now is at the rink".

== Career statistics ==
=== Regular season and playoffs ===
			Regular season					Playoffs
Season	Team	League	GP	G	A	Pts	PIM	GP	G	A	Pts	PIM
1995–96	Stratford Cullitons	MWJHL	47	8	15	23	32	—	—	—	—	—
1996–97	Ottawa 67's	OHL	65	8	12	20	40	24	4	7	11	13
1997–98	Ottawa 67's	OHL	55	34	26	60	87	13	6	5	11	14
1998–99	Ottawa 67's	OHL	44	29	26	55	69	9	6	5	11	8
1999–2000	Ottawa 67's	OHL	48	34	38	72	95	2	0	1	1	0
2000–01	Norfolk Admirals	AHL	61	15	27	42	126	9	4	3	7	10
2000–01	Chicago Blackhawks	NHL	13	0	1	1	4	—	—	—	—	—
2001–02	Chicago Blackhawks	NHL	80	12	16	28	124	5	0	0	0	8
2002–03	Chicago Blackhawks	NHL	82	14	15	29	113	—	—	—	—	—
2003–04	Chicago Blackhawks	NHL	82	21	24	45	106	—	—	—	—	—
2004–05	Trondheim Black Panthers	NOR	25	10	17	27	87	11	6	6	12	44
2005–06	Chicago Blackhawks	NHL	82	25	23	48	107	—	—	—	—	—
2006–07	San Jose Sharks	NHL	71	11	10	21	83	4	0	0	0	2
2007–08	Toronto Maple Leafs	NHL	35	4	6	10	60	—	—	—	—	—
2008–09	Toronto Marlies	AHL	56	12	15	27	34	—	—	—	—	—
2008–09	Hartford Wolf Pack	AHL	18	6	8	14	31	5	1	0	1	4
2009–10	Kloten Flyers	NLA	39	13	14	27	69	10	1	4	5	29
2010–11	Kloten Flyers	NLA	41	16	9	25	58	18	6	3	9	60
2011–12	Syracuse Crunch	AHL	39	7	10	17	41	4	3	1	4	0
2011–12	Anaheim Ducks	NHL	5	0	0	0	5	—	—	—	—	—
2012–13	Iserlohn Roosters	DEL	43	13	15	28	122	—	—	—	—	—
2013–14	Eisbären Berlin	DEL	32	10	20	30	34	3	0	0	0	2
2014–15	Eisbären Berlin	DEL	25	5	6	11	64	—	—	—	—	—
2015–16	Eisbären Berlin	DEL	12	2	1	3	12	7	0	2	2	16
NHL totals			450	87	95	182	602	9	0	0	0	10
AHL totals			174	40	60	100	232	18	8	4	12	14
DEL totals			112	30	42	72	232	10	0	2	2	18

=== International ===
Year	Team	Event	Result	GP	G	A	Pts	PIM
2000	Canada	WJC	3rd place, bronze medalist(s)	7	2	0	2	8
Junior totals				7	2	0	2	8

Awards and achievements
Preceded by Ty Jones	Chicago Blackhawks first-round draft pick 1998	Succeeded by Steve McCarthy
