= Martin Lojek =

Czech ice hockey player

- Born: August 19, 1985 (age 39); Brno, Czechoslovakia
- Height: 6 ft 5 in (196 cm)
- Weight: 220 lb (100 kg; 15 st 10 lb)
- Position: Defence
- Shoots: Right
- CZE-3 team Former teams: SKLH Žďár nad Sázavou; MHC Martin; Piráti Chomutov; HC Oceláři Třinec; HC Moeller Pardubice; Florida Panthers
- NHL draft: 105th overall, 2003; Florida Panthers
- Playing career: 2005–present

Martin Lojek (born August 19, 1985) is a Czech ice hockey player currently with SKLH Žďár nad Sázavou of the 2nd Czech Republic Hockey League, the third-tier league in the Czech Republic. He played 5 games in the National Hockey League with the Florida Panthers between 2007 and 2008, though most of his career, which started in 2005, has been in his native Czech Republic. Internationally Lojek played for the Czech national junior team at the 2005 World Junior Championships, where he won a bronze medal.

== Playing career ==
Medal record

Representing Czech Republic

World Junior Championships
Bronze medal – third place	2005 United States	

In 2002 Lojek moved to North American and joined the Brampton Battalion of the Ontario Hockey League. He was in his first season with Brampton when the Florida Panthers selected him in the fourth round of the 2003 NHL Entry Draft with the 105th overall pick. He spent two more seasons in the Battalion, totalling only five goals with 42 assists in 191 contests.

Lojek made his pro debut during the 2005–06 season with the ECHL's Florida Everblades (45 games, three goals, 11 assists), later getting promoted to the AHL Rochester Americans (15 games, one goal, one assist).

In 2006–07, Lojek spent most of the season with the Americans (69 games, six goals, 13 assists), earning a three-game callup to the Panthers in February. He scored his first NHL point in his third and final game of the season, an assist in a 5–2 victory over the Phoenix Coyotes. He also logged a plus-3 rating in the game.

Lojek spent the balance of the 2007–08 season in Rochester (72 games, six goals, five assists). He earned a two-game callup near the end of December, registering a minus-1 rating and not impacting the scoresheet in any other way.

From 2008 to 2014 Lojek played in the Czech Extraliga with HC Oceláři Třinec, HC Moeller Pardubice, and Piráti Chomutov.

== Career statistics ==
=== Regular season and playoffs ===
			Regular season					Playoffs
Season	Team	League	GP	G	A	Pts	PIM	GP	G	A	Pts	PIM
1999–2000	HC Žďár nad Sázavou	CZE-2 U18	31	6	4	10	30	—	—	—	—	—
2000–01	HC IPB Pojišťovna Pardubice	CZE U18	46	2	2	4	42	7	0	0	0	6
2000–01	HC IPB Pojišťovna Pardubice	CZE U20	2	0	0	0	0	—	—	—	—	—
2001–02	HC IPB Pojišťovna Pardubice	CZE U18	19	3	2	5	18	1	0	0	0	2
2001–02	HC IPB Pojišťovna Pardubice	CZE U20	28	0	3	3	12	6	1	0	1	0
2002–03	Brampton Battalion	OHL	65	1	13	14	47	11	0	1	1	6
2003–04	Brampton Battalion	OHL	68	3	17	20	37	12	0	4	4	2
2004–05	Brampton Battalion	OHL	58	1	12	13	58	6	0	0	0	6
2005–06	Rochester Americans	AHL	15	1	1	2	16	—	—	—	—	—
2005–06	Florida Everblades	ECHL	45	3	11	14	40	2	0	0	0	0
2006–07	Florida Panthers	NHL	3	0	1	1	0	—	—	—	—	—
2006–07	Rochester Americans	AHL	69	6	13	19	87	—	—	—	—	—
2007–08	Florida Panthers	NHL	2	0	0	0	0	—	—	—	—	—
2007–08	Rochester Americans	AHL	72	6	5	11	97	—	—	—	—	—
2008–09	HC Oceláři Třinec	ELH	9	0	1	1	6	—	—	—	—	—
2008–09	HC Havířov Panthers	CZE-2	20	3	0	3	71	—	—	—	—	—
2008–09	HC Moeller Pardubice	ELH	12	0	0	0	0	7	2	1	3	4
2008–09	HC Chrudim	CZE-2	9	2	0	2	2	3	0	0	0	4
2009–10	HC Oceláři Třinec	ELH	47	1	3	4	28	5	0	0	0	10
2010–11	HC Oceláři Třinec	ELH	52	5	11	16	68	18	2	2	4	20
2011–12	HC Oceláři Třinec	ELH	52	5	4	9	44	5	0	0	0	8
2012–13	HC Oceláři Třinec	ELH	42	4	4	8	28	13	0	1	1	12
2013–14	HC Oceláři Třinec	ELH	20	0	0	0	6	—	—	—	—	—
2013–14	Piráti Chomutov	ELH	16	0	0	0	20	—	—	—	—	—
2014–15	MHC Martin	SVK	44	2	5	7	40	—	—	—	—	—
2015–16	SKLH Žďár nad Sázavou	CZE-3	14	3	4	7	12	11	1	2	3	39
2016–17	SK Horácká Slavia Třebíč	CZE-2	50	0	5	5	22	4	0	0	0	2
2017–18	SKLH Žďár nad Sázavou	CZE-3	34	2	19	21	48	6	0	1	1	10
2018–19	SKLH Žďár nad Sázavou	CZE-3	37	4	8	12	36	4	0	0	0	0
2019–20	SKLH Žďár nad Sázavou	CZE-3	27	5	7	12	42	—	—	—	—	—
2020–21	SKLH Žďár nad Sázavou	CZE-3	4	0	0	0	0	—	—	—	—	—
2021–22	SKLH Žďár nad Sázavou	CZE-3	29	2	8	10	24	—	—	—	—	—
AHL totals			156	13	19	32	200	—	—	—	—	—
ELH totals			250	15	23	38	200	48	4	4	8	54
NHL totals			5	0	1	1	0	—	—	—	—	—

=== International ===
Year	Team	Event	GP	G	A	Pts	PIM
2005	Czech Republic	WJC	7	0	0	0	2
Junior totals			7	0	0	0	2
