= Roman Lyuduchin =

Russian ice hockey player (born 1988)

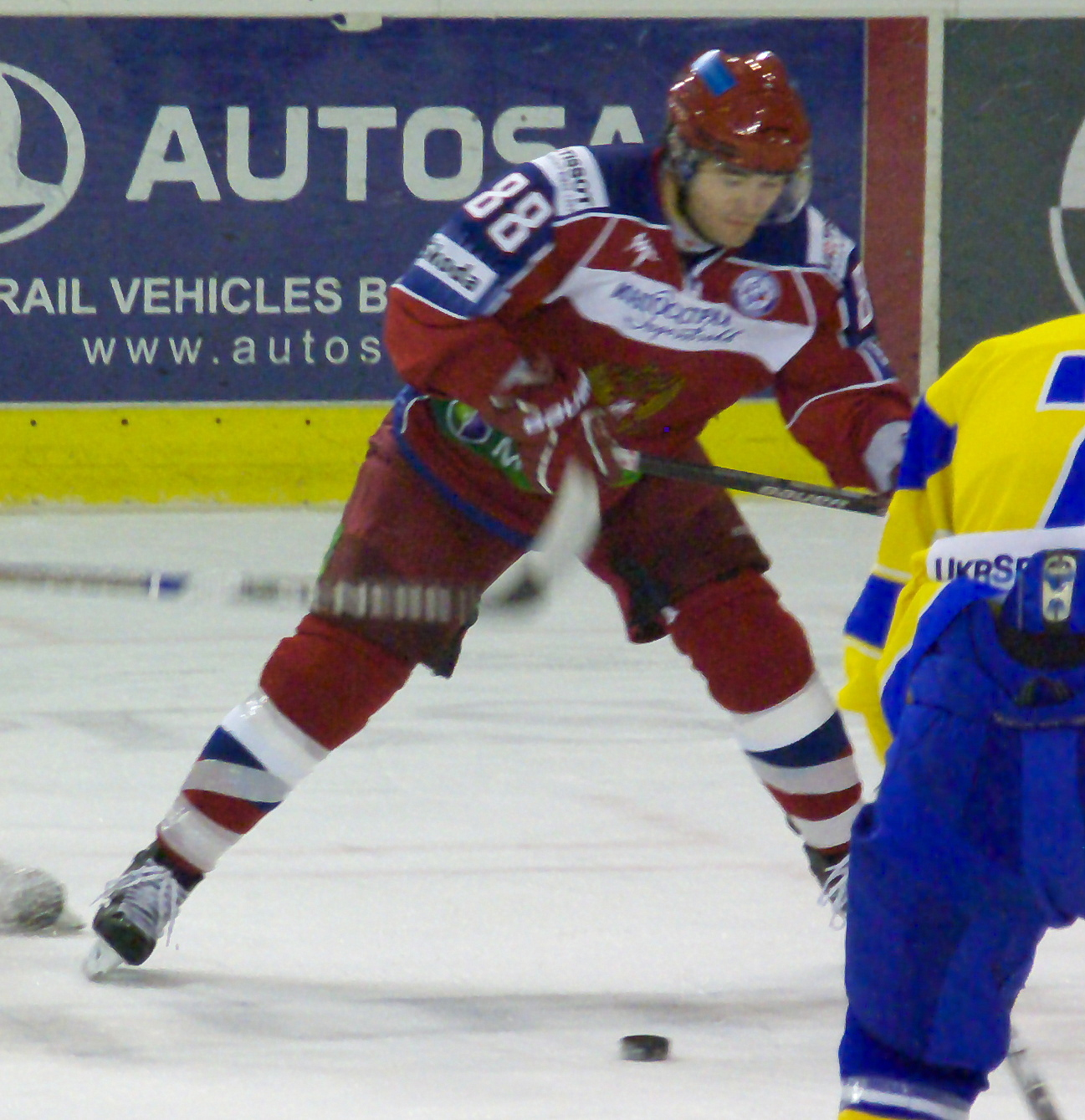
- Born: May 4, 1988 Penza, Russian SFSR, Soviet Union
- Height: 6 ft 0 in (183 cm)
- Weight: 205 lb (93 kg; 14 st 9 lb)
- Position: Forward
- Shoots: Left
- team Former teams: Free agent Spartak Moscow; Lokomotiv Yaroslavl; Neftekhimik Nizhnekamsk; Torpedo Nizhny Novgorod; HC Sochi; HC Yugra; High1
- Playing career: 2008–present

Roman Lyuduchin (born May 4, 1988) is a Russian professional ice hockey forward. He is currently a free agent having last played for High1 of Asia League Ice Hockey (ALIH).

Lyduchin previously played in the Kontinental Hockey League for HC Spartak Moscow, Lokomotiv Yaroslavl, HC Neftekhimik Nizhnekamsk, HC Sochi and HC Yugra. He joined High1 of Asia League Ice Hockey in 2018 and spent one season with the team but became a free agent at the conclusion of the season after High1 were not included in the Asia League's team lineup for the 2019-20 season.
