= Petr Macholda =

Czech ice hockey player

- Born: January 25, 1982 (age 44) Most, Czechoslovakia
- Height: 6 ft 2 in (188 cm)
- Weight: 190 lb (86 kg; 13 st 8 lb)
- Position: Defence
- Shoots: Right
- Czech Extraliga team: HC Sparta Praha
- Playing career: 2000–present

Petr Macholda (born January 25, 1982) is a Czech professional ice hockey player. He played with HC Sparta Praha in the Czech Extraliga during the 2010–11 Czech Extraliga season.

== Career statistics ==
| | | | Regular season | | | | | Playoffs |
| Season | Team | League | GP | G | A | Pts | PIM | GP | G | A | Pts | PIM |
|---|---|---|---|---|---|---|---|---|---|---|---|---|
| 1999–00 | HC Litvinov U20 | Czech U20 | 34 | 1 | 5 | 6 | 24 | 3 | 1 | 0 | 1 | 2 |
| 2000–01 | HC Litvinov U20 | Czech U20 | 42 | 9 | 14 | 23 | 48 | — | — | — | — | — |
| 2000–01 | HC Chemopetrol | Czech | 7 | 0 | 0 | 0 | 2 | — | — | — | — | — |
| 2000–01 | HC Slovan Ústí nad Labem | Czech2 | 5 | 0 | 1 | 1 | 2 | — | — | — | — | — |
| 2001–02 | HC Litvinov U20 | Czech U20 | 10 | 6 | 6 | 12 | 8 | 6 | 2 | 0 | 2 | 20 |
| 2001–02 | HC Chemopetrol | Czech | 24 | 1 | 2 | 3 | 6 | — | — | — | — | — |
| 2001–02 | HC Karlovy Vary | Czech | 5 | 0 | 1 | 1 | 4 | — | — | — | — | — |
| 2001–02 | KLH Chomutov | Czech2 | 4 | 0 | 1 | 1 | 0 | — | — | — | — | — |
| 2002–03 | HC Chemopetrol | Czech | 10 | 0 | 1 | 1 | 0 | — | — | — | — | — |
| 2002–03 | HC Zlin | Czech | 25 | 2 | 3 | 5 | 36 | — | — | — | — | — |
| 2002–03 | HC Slovan Ústí nad Labem | Czech2 | 1 | 0 | 0 | 0 | 0 | — | — | — | — | — |
| 2003–04 | HC Zlin | Czech | 49 | 1 | 12 | 13 | 88 | 11 | 3 | 2 | 5 | 8 |
| 2004–05 | Kassel Huskies | DEL | 52 | 0 | 3 | 3 | 12 | — | — | — | — | — |
| 2005–06 | HC Energie Karlovy Vary | Czech | 30 | 0 | 2 | 2 | 12 | — | — | — | — | — |
| 2005–06 | KLH Chomutov | Czech2 | 1 | 0 | 0 | 0 | 0 | — | — | — | — | — |
| 2005–06 | Frankfurt Lions | DEL | 4 | 1 | 0 | 1 | 4 | — | — | — | — | — |
| 2006–07 | Frankfurt Lions | DEL | 44 | 2 | 9 | 11 | 69 | 6 | 0 | 0 | 0 | 0 |
| 2006–07 | EV Landsberg 2000 | Germany2 | 3 | 1 | 1 | 2 | 2 | — | — | — | — | — |
| 2007–08 | Grizzly Adams Wolfsburg | DEL | 45 | 1 | 4 | 5 | 58 | — | — | — | — | — |
| 2008–09 | Grizzly Adams Wolfsburg | DEL | 43 | 4 | 6 | 10 | 26 | 9 | 0 | 2 | 2 | 4 |
| 2009–10 | HC Sparta Praha | Czech | 42 | 3 | 3 | 6 | 32 | 7 | 0 | 0 | 0 | 2 |
| 2010–11 | HC Sparta Praha | Czech | 41 | 0 | 6 | 6 | 20 | — | — | — | — | — |
| 2011–12 | Augsburger Panther | DEL | 29 | 0 | 0 | 0 | 4 | — | — | — | — | — |
| 2012–13 | Rytiri Kladno | Czech | 39 | 1 | 5 | 6 | 8 | 3 | 0 | 1 | 1 | 2 |
| 2013–14 | Dresdner Eislöwen | DEL2 | 48 | 12 | 28 | 40 | 73 | 3 | 0 | 1 | 1 | 2 |
| 2014–15 | Dresdner Eislöwen | DEL2 | 46 | 11 | 20 | 31 | 24 | 7 | 1 | 1 | 2 | 6 |
| 2015–16 | Dresdner Eislöwen | DEL2 | 49 | 13 | 27 | 40 | 40 | 15 | 2 | 5 | 7 | 12 |
| 2016–17 | Dresdner Eislöwen | DEL2 | 49 | 8 | 15 | 23 | 26 | 7 | 1 | 1 | 2 | 10 |
| 2017–18 | Dresdner Eislöwen | DEL2 | 3 | 0 | 2 | 2 | 2 | — | — | — | — | — |
| Czech totals | | | 272 | 8 | 35 | 43 | 208 | 32 | 3 | 3 | 6 | 20 |
| DEL totals | | | 217 | 8 | 22 | 30 | 173 | 22 | 0 | 2 | 2 | 10 |
