= Daniel Fernholm =

Swedish ice hockey player

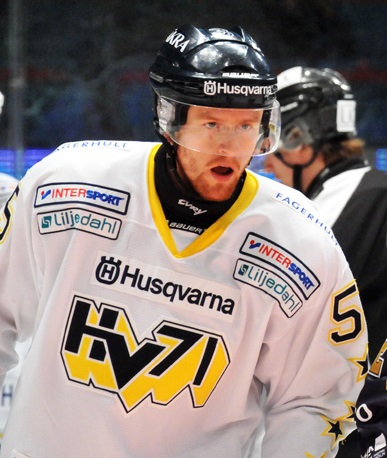
- Born: December 20, 1983 (age 42) Stockholm, Sweden
- Height: 6 ft 4 in (193 cm)
- Weight: 220 lb (100 kg; 15 st 10 lb)
- Position: Defence
- Shot: Left
- SHL team Former teams: Djurgårdens IF; HC Bolzano; Wilkes-Barre/Scranton Penguins; Linköpings HC; Neftekhimik Nizhnekamsk; Dinamo Minsk; Atlant Moscow Oblast; HIFK; HV71; Rapperswil-Jona Lakers
- National team: Sweden
- NHL draft: 101st overall, 2002; Pittsburgh Penguins
- Playing career: 2001–2015

Daniel Fernholm (born December 20, 1983) is a Swedish former professional ice hockey defenseman. He last played for Djurgårdens IF of the Swedish Hockey League (SHL). Fernholm was selected by the Pittsburgh Penguins in the 4th round (101st overall) of the 2002 NHL entry draft.

== Playing career ==
Fernholm was drafted in the 4th round, 101st overall, in the 2002 NHL entry draft by the Pittsburgh Penguins. After beginning his career with Djurgårdens IF in 2004, he spent the 2005–06 season in the United States, playing with the Penguins affiliates, the Wheeling Nailers and the Wilkes-Barre/Scranton Penguins. He appeared in nine playoff games for the Nailers of the ECHL, recording a goal and three assists before returning to his native Sweden.

Ferholm spent two seasons abroad in the Kontinental Hockey League with Neftekhimik Nizhnekamsk, Dinamo Minsk and Atlant Moscow Oblast before signing a one-year contract with HIFK in the Finnish SM-liiga.

On July 21, 2014, Fernholm returned to Djurgårdens IF on a two-year deal starting in the 2014–15 season.

== Career statistics ==
=== Regular season and playoffs ===
			Regular season					Playoffs
Season	Team	League	GP	G	A	Pts	PIM	GP	G	A	Pts	PIM
1999–2000	Mora IK	J18 Allsv	1	0	0	0	2	1	1	1	2	2
1999–2000	Mora IK	J20	33	3	3	6	8	1	0	0	0	0
2000–01	Mora IK	J20	3	0	1	1	2	—	—	—	—	—
2000–01	Mora IK	Allsv	2	0	0	0	0	—	—	—	—	—
2001–02	Djurgårdens IF	SWE.3 U20	9	5	12	17	12	—	—	—	—	—
2002–03	Huddinge IK	Allsv	39	6	10	16	20	2	1	0	1	0
2002–03	Huddinge IK	J20	—	—	—	—	—	3	0	1	1	2
2003–04	Djurgårdens IF	SEL	37	4	7	11	28	4	0	0	0	4
2003–04	Hammarby IF	Allsv	15	1	3	4	6	—	—	—	—	—
2004–05	Djurgårdens IF	J20	2	0	0	0	4	—	—	—	—	—
2004–05	Djurgårdens IF	SEL	31	3	2	5	22	11	0	0	0	14
2004–05	HC Bolzano	ITA	7	0	2	2	2	—	—	—	—	—
2005–06	Wilkes–Barre/Scranton Penguins	AHL	27	1	6	7	10	—	—	—	—	—
2005–06	Wheeling Nailers	ECHL	29	2	4	6	20	9	1	3	4	6
2006–07	Wheeling Nailers	ECHL	13	0	3	3	14	—	—	—	—	—
2006–07	Djurgårdens IF	SEL	32	4	12	16	16	—	—	—	—	—
2007–08	Linköpings HC	SEL	54	8	21	29	28	16	3	7	10	20
2008–09	Linköpings HC	SEL	40	5	8	13	22	7	2	2	4	6
2009–10	Linköpings HC	SEL	52	3	16	19	42	12	0	2	2	12
2010–11	Neftekhimik Nizhnekamsk	KHL	18	0	3	3	10	—	—	—	—	—
2010–11	Dinamo Minsk	KHL	21	1	6	7	16	7	0	0	0	4
2011–12	Atlant Moscow Oblast	KHL	10	0	0	0	14	—	—	—	—	—
2011–12	HIFK	SM-liiga	40	3	10	13	48	4	0	0	0	0
2012–13	HV71	SEL	43	4	12	16	36	5	0	1	1	2
2013–14	Rapperswil–Jona Lakers	NLA	15	0	2	2	10	—	—	—	—	—
2013–14	HIFK	Liiga	36	2	8	10	20	2	0	0	0	2
2014–15	Djurgårdens IF	SHL	10	0	1	1	12	—	—	—	—	—
SHL totals			299	31	79	110	206	55	5	12	17	58
KHL totals			49	1	9	10	40	7	0	0	0	4

=== International ===
Year	Team	Event	Result	GP	G	A	Pts	PIM
2008	Sweden	WC	4th	8	0	3	3	4
2011	Sweden	WC	2nd place, silver medalist(s)	9	0	1	1	4
Senior totals				17	0	4	4	8

== Records ==
- Linköpings HC club record for assists in a playoff season, defenceman (7), 2007–08
- Linköpings HC club record for points in a playoff season, defenceman (10), 2007–08
