= Jyrki Välivaara =

Finnish ice hockey player

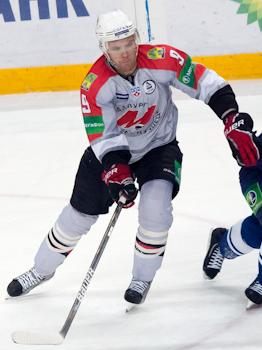
- Born: May 30, 1976 (age 48); Jyväskylä, Finland
- Height: 6 ft 2 in (188 cm)
- Weight: 203 lb (92 kg; 14 st 7 lb)
- Position: Defence
- Shot: Left
- Played for: JYP; Tappara; Linköping HC; Malmö Redhawks; Metallurg Novokuznetsk
- National team: Finland
- NHL draft: Undrafted
- Playing career: 1997–2014

Jyrki Välivaara
Medal record

Representing Finland

Ice hockey

World Championships
Gold medal – first place	2011 Slovakia	

Jyrki Välivaara (born May 30, 1976) is a Finnish professional ice hockey defenceman who currently plays for Metallurg Novokuznetsk in the Kontinental Hockey League. In the past he played for JYP of the SM-liiga. He was on Finland's IIHF gold medal-winning team on 2011.

== Career statistics ==
			Regular season					Playoffs
Season	Team	League	GP	G	A	Pts	PIM	GP	G	A	Pts	PIM
1992–93	JYP Jyväskylä U18	U18 SM-sarja	31	3	3	6	24	—	—	—	—	—
1993–94	JYP Jyväskylä U18	U18 SM-sarja	14	2	2	4	6	—	—	—	—	—
1994–95	JYP Jyväskylä U20	U20 SM-liiga	35	12	8	20	32	8	1	5	6	10
1995–96	JYP Jyväskylä U20	U20 SM-liiga	31	6	6	12	45	6	0	1	1	10
1996–97	JYP Jyväskylä U20	U20 SM-liiga	34	8	13	21	22	7	4	0	4	2
1997–98	JYP Jyväskylä	SM-liiga	47	2	3	5	28	—	—	—	—	—
1998–99	JYP Jyväskylä	SM-liiga	54	5	7	12	30	3	0	1	1	0
1999–00	JYP Jyväskylä	SM-liiga	53	5	13	18	8	—	—	—	—	—
2000–01	JYP Jyväskylä	SM-liiga	56	6	10	16	28	—	—	—	—	—
2001–02	Tappara	SM-liiga	52	10	11	21	34	10	1	1	2	4
2002–03	Tappara	SM-liiga	40	7	0	7	16	—	—	—	—	—
2003–04	Linköping HC	Elitserien	48	2	14	16	36	5	0	0	0	6
2004–05	Linköping HC	Elitserien	47	5	10	15	48	5	0	1	1	8
2005–06	Linköping HC	Elitserien	42	2	13	15	28	13	0	0	0	33
2006–07	Linköping HC	Elitserien	11	1	0	1	8	—	—	—	—	—
2006–07	Malmö Redhawks	Elitserien	31	2	11	13	36	—	—	—	—	—
2007–08	Malmö Redhawks	HockeyAllsvenskan	43	5	23	28	62	9	1	1	2	2
2008–09	JYP Jyväskylä	SM-liiga	57	6	16	22	48	15	2	6	8	10
2009–10	JYP Jyväskylä	SM-liiga	14	3	5	8	10	14	0	2	2	8
2010–11	JYP Jyväskylä	SM-liiga	53	8	20	28	42	10	1	4	5	6
2011–12	Metallurg Novokuznetsk	KHL	53	2	16	18	20	—	—	—	—	—
2012–13	JYP Jyväskylä	SM-liiga	49	3	7	10	38	11	1	0	1	10
2013–14	JYP Jyväskylä	Liiga	45	3	11	14	32	3	0	1	1	2
SM-liiga totals			520	58	103	161	314	66	5	15	20	40
Elitserien totals			179	12	48	60	156	23	0	1	1	47
