= Ryazanov =

Ryazanov (Russian: Рязанов) is a Russian male surname. Its feminine counterpart is Ryazanova. It may be variously transliterated as Riazanov, Ryazanoff, etc. Notable people with the surname include:

== Ryazanov/Ryazanova ==
- Alexander Ryazanov (born 1953), businessman and politician
- Aleksey Ryazanov (pilot) (1920–1992), Soviet WWII flying ace
- David Ryazanov (1870–1938), Marxist scholar
- Eldar Ryazanov (1927–2015), film director
- Irina Ryazanova
- Mikhail Ryazanov (born 1986), Russian ice hockey player
- Pyotr Ryazanov (1899–1942), composer and teacher
- Raisa Ryazanova (born 1944), Russian actress
- Yuri Ryazanov (1987–2009), gymnast
- Yuri Ryazanov (politician) (born 1970), Russian businessman and politician

== Other transliterations ==
- David Riazanov (1870-1938), Russian revolutionary, historian, bibliographer and archivist
- Daria Riazanova (born 2000), Russian weightlifter
- Ekaterina Riazanova (born 1991), Russian former competitive ice dancer
- Vera Sell-Ryazanoff (born 1951), Russian-German painter and philosopher

== See also ==
- 4258 Ryazanov, an asteroid
