= Mikhail Ryazanov =

Russian ice hockey player

- KHL team: Metallurg Novokuznetsk

Mikhail Ryazanov is a professional ice hockey player who played for Metallurg Novokuznetsk of the Kontinental Hockey League during 2010–11 season.
