= Alexei Yakhin =

Russian ice hockey player

- Born: March 26, 1984 (age 42)
- Position: Goaltender
- KHL team: Torpedo Nizhny Novgorod
- Playing career: 2009–present

HC Spartak Moscow goaltender Alexei Yakhin during KHL game against Amur Khabarovsk on October 10, 2011.

Alexei Yakhin (born March 26, 1984) is a Russian professional ice hockey goaltender who currently plays for Torpedo Nizhny Novgorod of the Kontinental Hockey League (KHL).
