= Jakub Štěpánek =

Czech professional ice hockey goaltender (born 1986)

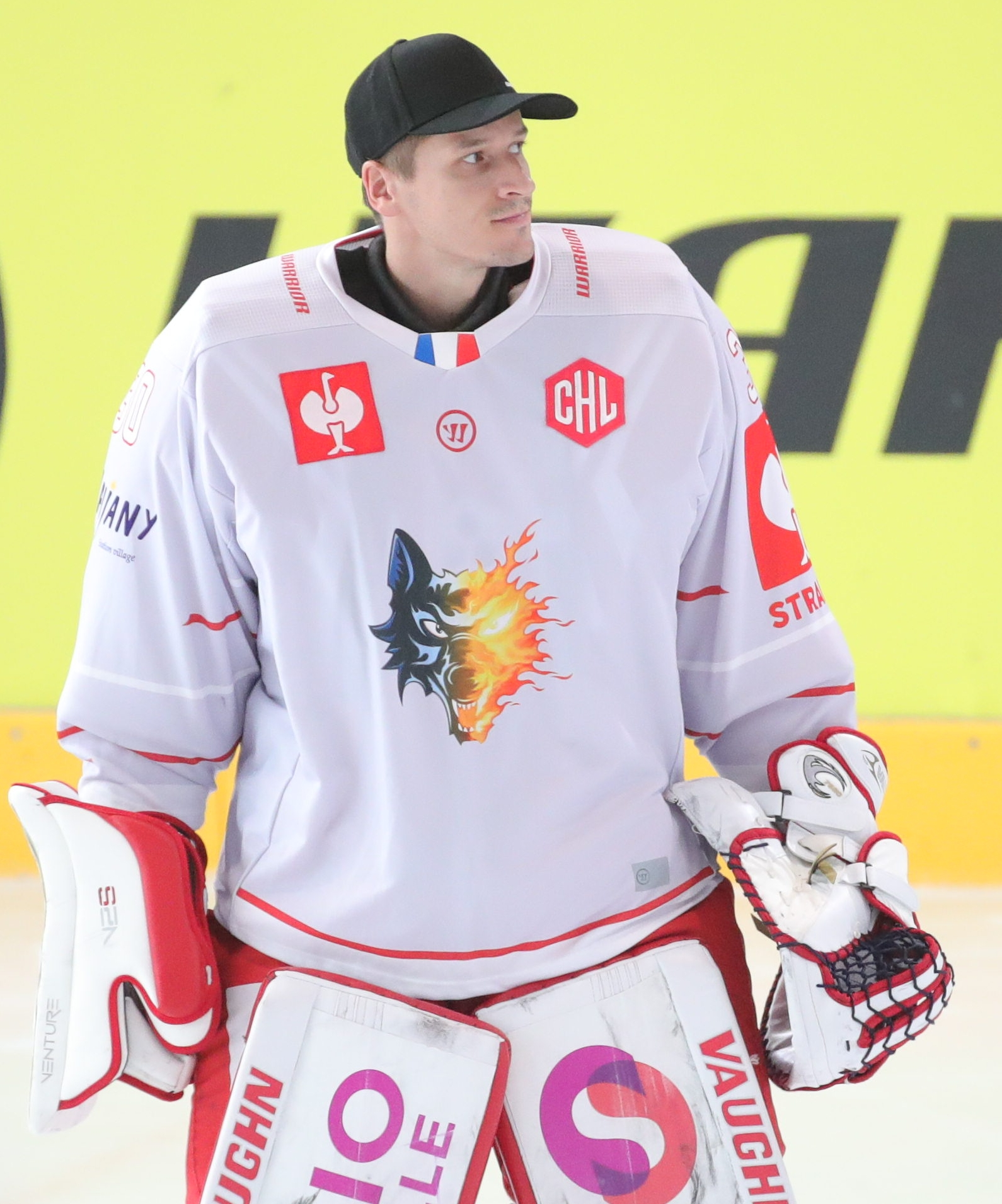
- Born: 20 June 1986 (age 38); Vsetín, Czechoslovakia
- Height: 6 ft 1 in (185 cm)
- Weight: 156 lb (71 kg; 11 st 2 lb)
- Position: Goaltender
- Catches: Left
- Ligue Magnus team Former teams: Brûleurs de Loups; HC Oceláři Třinec; HC Slovan Bratislava; HC Vitkovice; SKA St. Petersburg; HC Lev Praha; Severstal Cherepovets; SC Bern; HC Dynamo Pardubice; Lukko Rauma
- National team: Czech Republic
- Playing career: 2006–present

Medal record

Representing Czech Republic

World Championships
Gold medal – first place	2010 Cologne	
Bronze medal – third place	2011 Bratislava	
Bronze medal – third place	2012 Helsinki	

Jakub Štěpánek (born 20 June 1986) is a Czech professional ice hockey goaltender currently playing for Brûleurs de Loups of the French Ligue Magnus.

== Playing career ==
Štěpánek began his professional career with HC Vítkovice of the Czech Extraliga in 2006. He was selected to play for the Czech national team at the 2010 Winter Olympics along with goaltenders Ondřej Pavelec and Tomáš Vokoun, both of whom play in the National Hockey League. He has also represented his country at two IIHF World Championships, helping the Czechs win gold at the 2010 tournament in Germany.

Štěpánek helped St. Petersburg win their fourth Spengler Cup in 2010, their first title since 1977. He won the National League A title with SC Bern in 2016.

== Career statistics ==
=== Regular season and playoffs ===
			Regular season									Playoffs
Season	Team	League	GP	W	L	T/OT	MIN	GA	SO	GAA	SV%	GP	W	L	MIN	GA	SO	GAA	SV%
2006–07	HC Vítkovice	ELH	5	1	4	0	265	16	0	3.62	.909	—	—	—	—	—	—	—	—
2007–08	HC Vítkovice	ELH	7	2	5	0	230	12	0	3.13	.928	—	—	—	—	—	—	—	—
2009–10	HC Vítkovice	ELH	34	20	14	0	2031	86	2	2.54	.921	10	—	—	—	—	—	1.85	.944
2010–11	SKA St. Petersburg	KHL	32	16	8	5	1844	63	3	2.05	.923	11	7	4	698	25	1	2.15	.921
2011–12	SKA St. Petersburg	KHL	35	21	10	3	2068	79	1	2.29	.915	13	7	6	750	22	3	1.76	.924
2012–13	SKA St. Petersburg	KHL	4	1	3	0	237	13	0	3.29	.867	—	—	—	—	—	—	—	—
2012–13	HC Lev Praha	KHL	12	5	6	1	714	35	0	2.94	.915	—	—	—	—	—	—	—	—
2013–14	Cherepovets Severstal	KHL	47	17	19	10	2776	97	4	2.10	.931	—	—	—	—	—	—	—	—
2014–15	Cherepovets Severstal	KHL	55	18	23	13	3263	132	4	2.43	.913	—	—	—	—	—	—	—	—
2015–16	Cherepovets Severstal	KHL	26	7	15	2	1469	68	2	2.78	.897	—	—	—	—	—	—	—	—
2015–16	SC Bern	NLA	17	—	—	—	1042	49	0	2.82	.900	14	—	—	—	—	—	2.22	.913
2016–17	HC Dynamo Pardubice	ELH	8	3	5	0	404	25	0	3.71	.856	—	—	—	—	—	—	—	—
2016–17	Lukko	Liiga	20	4	13	3	1192	55	1	2.77	.915	—	—	—	—	—	—	—	—
2017–18	HC Slovan Bratislava	KHL	37	12	20	2	2007	97	1	2.90	.915	—	—	—	—	—	—	—	—
2018–19	HC Slovan Bratislava	KHL	36	8	25	2	2068	105	0	3.05	.899	—	—	—	—	—	—	—	—
ELH totals			54	26	28	0	2930	139	2	3.25	.921	10	—	—	—	—	—	1.85	.903
KHL totals			284	105	129	38	16446	689	2	2.65	.909	24	14	10	1448	47	4	1.96	.923
