= Sebastian Erixon =

Swedish ice hockey player

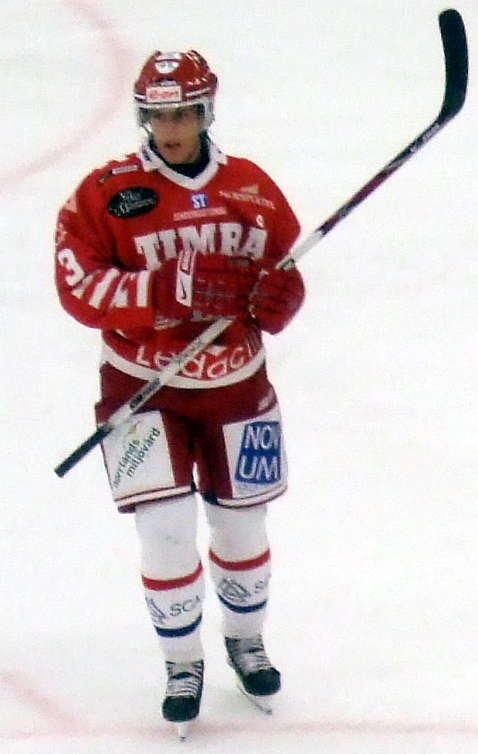
- Erixon playing for Timrå IK in 2008
- Born: September 12, 1989 (age 36) Sundsvall, Sweden
- Height: 5 ft 10 in (178 cm)
- Weight: 174 lb (79 kg; 12 st 6 lb)
- Position: Defence
- Shot: Left
- Played for: Timrå IK; Chicago Wolves; Växjö Lakers; Färjestad BK
- NHL draft: Undrafted
- Playing career: 2007–2021

Sebastian Erixon (born September 12, 1989) is a Swedish former professional ice hockey defenceman who played in the Swedish Hockey League (SHL). Representing Sweden in international competition, he has won silver at the 2009 World Junior Championships and bronze at the 2007 IIHF World U18 Championships.

== Playing career ==
Born in Sundsvall, Sweden, Erixon played junior hockey with local team Timra IK. In 2004–05, he debuted at the under-18 level as a 15-year-old, playing two games in the J18 Allsvenskan. The following season, he dressed for 14 J18 games, recording three goals and two assists. He also competed with a regional all-star team from Medelpad in the annual TV-pucken, an under-15 national tournament, and notched two assists over four games. In 2006–07, Erixon moved on to Timra's J20 SuperElit team at 17 years old; he recorded 13 points (6 goals and 7 assists) over 39 games. His efforts also saw him debut with the men's team in Sweden's premiere Elitserien, dressing for two games.

Erixon then split the 2007–08 season between Timra in the Elitserien (pointless in 27 games) and IF Sundsvall of the second-tier HockeyAllsvenskan on a loan (7 points over 23 games). He became a full-time Elitserien player beginning in 2008–09 and recorded back-to-back 7-point campaigns. After a breakout 20-point season in 2010–11 (leading all team defencemen in scoring), Erixon was signed as an undrafted and unrestricted free agent in the National Hockey League (NHL) by the Vancouver Canucks on April 20, 2011. Joining the Canucks for his first NHL training camp in September 2011, he was assigned to the team's minor league affiliate, the Chicago Wolves of the American Hockey League (AHL). During the season Erixon was traded to the Anaheim Ducks in exchange for Andrew Gordon. Injury prevented Erixon appearing with the Ducks organization before he returned to Timra the following season.

== International play ==
Medal record

Representing Sweden

Ice hockey

IIHF World U20 Championships
Silver medal – second place	2009 Canada	

IIHF World U18 Championships
Bronze medal – third place	2007 Finland	

Erixon made his international debut with Sweden at the 2007 IIHF World U18 Championships in Finland. He recorded one assist over six games, helping Sweden to a bronze medal. Two years later, he moved on to the under-20 level at the 2009 World Junior Championships and notched two assists over six games. He helped Sweden to the gold medal game, where they were defeated 5–1 by Canada, earning silver.

== Personal life ==
Erixon's comes from a family of hockey players. His father, Staffan, is a retired ice hockey player who also played for Timra IK in the Elitserien and the Allsvenskan. His brother, Christopher, born a year before Erixon, has played with several in the HockeyAllsvenskan; the two played together with Timra IK during their junior years.
