= Alexei Kaigorodov =

Russian retired ice hockey forward (born 1983)

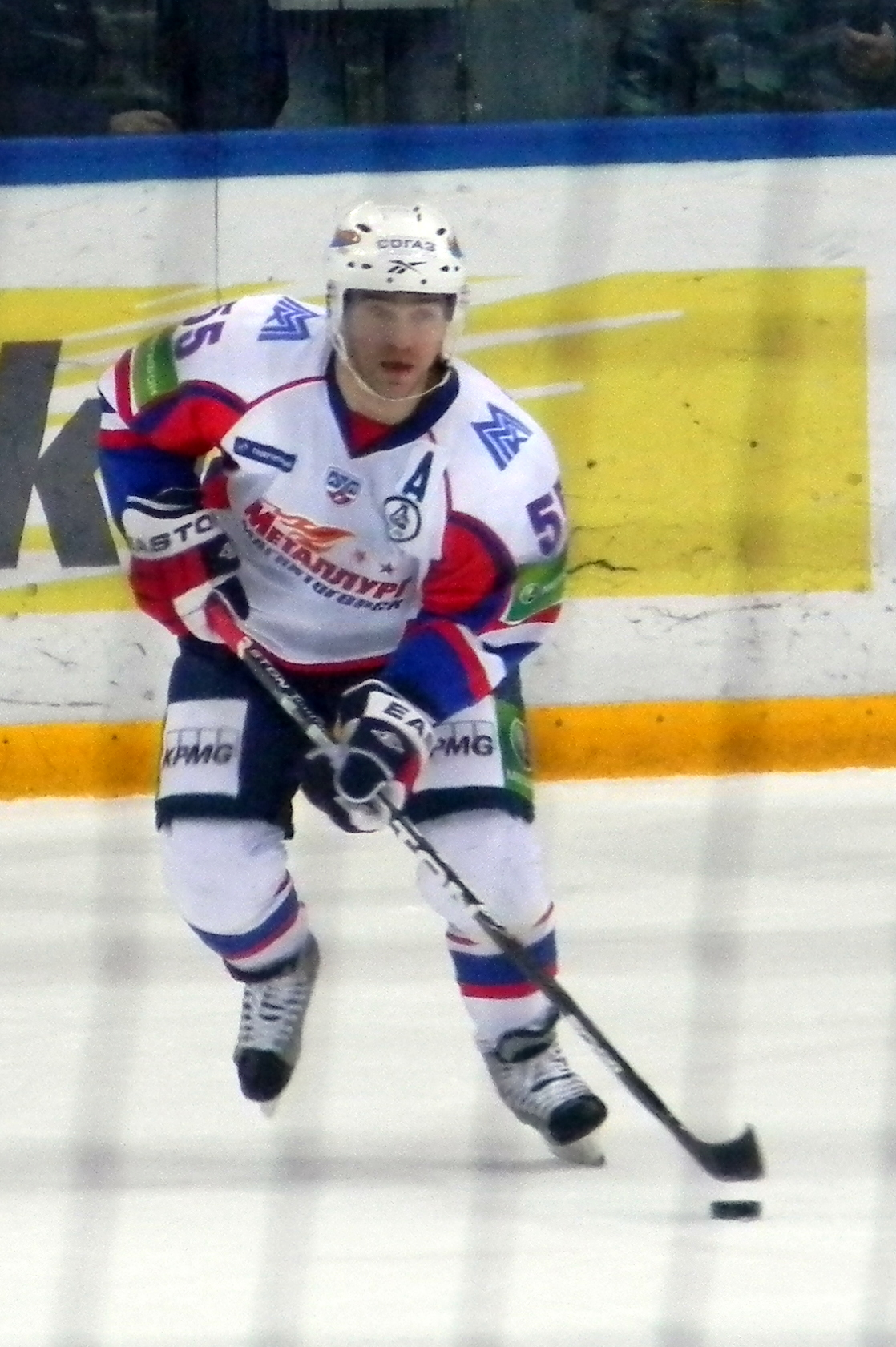
- Born: July 29, 1983 (age 42) Chelyabinsk, Russian SFSR, Soviet Union
- Height: 6 ft 0 in (183 cm)
- Weight: 194 lb (88 kg; 13 st 12 lb)
- Position: Centre
- Shot: Left
- Played for: Ottawa Senators; Salavat Yulaev Ufa; Barys Astana; Dynamo Moscow; Metallurg Magnitogorsk
- National team: Russia
- NHL draft: 47th overall, 2002; Ottawa Senators
- Playing career: 1998–2016

Alexei Pavlovich Kaigorodov (Russian: Алексей Павлович Кайгородов; born July 29, 1983) is a Russian former professional ice hockey forward who last played with Metallurg Magnitogorsk of the Kontinental Hockey League (KHL).

== Playing career ==
Alexei Kaigorodov started his professional career with Metallurg Magnitogorsk of the then Russian Super League (RSL) in 2001, where he played for five seasons. On August 24, 2006, Kaigorodov's contract was voluntarily suspended by Magnitogorsk, allowing him to pursue an NHL contract. Soon after, he signed a two-year contract with the Ottawa Senators. The Senators were searching for a "second-line centre" to take offensive pressure off the Senators' top line and hoped that Kaigorodov would be able to do that. He attended training camp and remained with the club but played only six games before being demoted to the Binghamton Senators of the American Hockey League (AHL). He refused to report and returned to Russia.

On November 4, 2006, he was suspended by the Senators. On January 3, 2007, his NHL rights were traded to the Phoenix Coyotes for Mike Comrie. Kaigorodov did not join the Coyotes and was placed on their suspended list. Despite his NHL contract, Kaigorodov returned to Magnitogorsk for the rest of the 2006-07 season. He continued with Magnitogorsk in following seasons.

In the 2015–16 season, Kaigorodov having left Salavat Yulaev Ufa signed a one-year contract with Barys Astana. He contributed with only 4 assists in 23 games before he was traded to HC Dynamo Moscow on November 4, 2015. Kaigorodov's struggles continued in Moscow, producing just 1 assist in 7 games before he was released from his contract. On December 15, 2015, he made another return to his hometown club, Metallurg Magnitogorsk, agreeing to terms for the remainder of the campaign.

== Career statistics ==
=== Regular season and playoffs ===
			Regular season					Playoffs
Season	Team	League	GP	G	A	Pts	PIM	GP	G	A	Pts	PIM
1998–99	Metallurg–2 Magnitogorsk	RUS-3	10	6	4	10	2	—	—	—	—	—
1999–2000	Metallurg–2 Magnitogorsk	RUS-3	19	2	3	5	8	—	—	—	—	—
2000–01	Metallurg–2 Magnitogorsk	RUS-3	45	12	21	33	32	—	—	—	—	—
2001–02	Metallurg Magnitogorsk	RSL	46	4	13	17	18	9	0	3	3	4
2002–03	Metallurg Magnitogorsk	RSL	46	8	14	22	20	3	0	1	1	0
2003–04	Metallurg Magnitogorsk	RSL	49	4	12	16	24	14	2	2	4	4
2004–05	Metallurg Magnitogorsk	RSL	57	15	34	49	40	5	0	3	3	2
2005–06	Metallurg Magnitogorsk	RSL	50	9	21	30	42	11	0	1	1	6
2006–07	Ottawa Senators	NHL	6	0	1	1	0	—	—	—	—	—
2006–07	Metallurg Magnitogorsk	RSL	32	6	12	18	18	15	2	8	10	14
2007–08	Metallurg Magnitogorsk	RSL	56	6	33	39	30	13	1	4	5	4
2008–09	Metallurg Magnitogorsk	KHL	56	7	29	36	26	12	4	4	8	10
2009–10	Metallurg Magnitogorsk	KHL	52	4	11	15	16	8	0	0	0	4
2010–11	Metallurg Magnitogorsk	KHL	53	10	29	39	12	18	2	7	9	2
2011–12	Metallurg Magnitogorsk	KHL	52	8	21	29	39	12	0	3	3	8
2012–13	Metallurg Magnitogorsk	KHL	5	1	0	1	0	—	—	—	—	—
2012–13	Salavat Yulaev Ufa	KHL	26	2	14	16	8	14	2	6	8	0
2013–14	Salavat Yulaev Ufa	KHL	47	3	26	29	14	18	1	8	9	4
2014–15	Salavat Yulaev Ufa	KHL	47	8	23	31	8	5	0	2	2	2
2015–16	Barys Astana	KHL	23	0	4	4	0	—	—	—	—	—
2015–16	Dynamo Moscow	KHL	7	0	1	1	2	—	—	—	—	—
2015–16	Metallurg Magnitogorsk	KHL	13	0	1	1	0	16	1	4	5	2
RSL totals			336	52	139	191	192	70	5	22	27	34
NHL totals			6	0	1	1	0	—	—	—	—	—
KHL totals			381	43	159	202	125	103	10	34	44	32

Medal record

Representing Russia

Ice hockey

World Junior Championships
Gold medal – first place	2003 Nova Scotia	

IIHF U18 Championships
Gold medal – first place	2001 Helsinki	

IIHF U17 Challenge
Gold medal – first place	2000 Ontario	

=== International ===
Year	Team	Event	Result	GP	G	A	Pts	PIM
2000	Russia	U17	1st place, gold medalist(s)	6	2	3	5	2
2001	Russia	WJC18	1st place, gold medalist(s)	6	1	5	6	8
2003	Russia	WJC	1st place, gold medalist(s)	6	1	2	3	4
2003	Russia	WC	5th	2	0	0	0	2
2011	Russia	WC	4th	8	1	3	4	2
Junior totals				18	4	10	14	14
Senior totals				10	1	3	4	4
