= SKLH Žďár nad Sázavou =

Czech ice hockey club

- City: Žďár nad Sázavou, Czech Republic
- League: Second National Hockey League
- Founded: 1939
- Home arena: Bouchalky
- Colours: Red, white
- Head coach: Martin Sobotka
- Website: www.hokejzr.cz

SKLH Žďár nad Sázavou is a Czech ice hockey team located in Žďár nad Sázavou, currently playing in the 2nd Czech Republic Hockey League, the third level of Czech ice hockey. It began play in 1938.
