= 2013–14 Porin Ässät season =

SM-liiga team season

2013–14 Porin Ässät
- League: 12th SM-liiga
- 2013–14 record: 16–7–5–32
- Home record: 11–3–6–10
- Road record: 5–1–2–22
- Goals for: 134
- Goals against: 177

Team information
- General manager: Mika Toivola
- Coach: Pekka Virta
- Captain: Ville Uusitalo
- Arena: Pori Ice Hall
- Average attendance: 4 155

Team leaders
- Goals: Niklas Hagman (21)
- Assists: Dragan Umicevic (33)
- Points: Niklas Hagman (38)
- Penalty minutes: Jyri Martiinen (160)
- Plus/minus: Tommi Taimi and Petteri Lindbohm (+3)
- Wins: Juuso Riksman and Rasmus Rinne (8)
- Goals against average: Rasmus Rinne (2,55)

The 2013–14 Porin Ässät season was the club's 38th season in the SM-liiga and the 46th season at the top-level of ice hockey in Finland. In the previous season, Ässät had won their third Finnish championship in its history by defeating Tappara in the finals. With this, Ässät's season started at home against Lukko by raising the championship banner to the roof of the Pori Ice Hall. The season went poorly for Ässät, as the team's ranking was third last in the regular season. Only TPS and KalPa collected fewer points.

== Off-season ==
The team experienced great changes after the championship season. In coaching, it had already been decided in January to leave head coach Karri Kivi without an extension contract and Pekka Virta from TPS was hired to replace him. Assistant coaches Mikael Kotkaniemi and Pasi Kaukoranta also changed scenery. Kaukoranta took over the Ässät A-juniors and Kotkaniemi got a position as the head coach of HC Keski-Uusimaa. Virtra's assistant Sami Karppinen and Ässät's own junior coach Jere Härkälä took over.

The number one goalkeeper Antti Raanta had left for the NHL. Juha Järvenpää, who played as second goalkeeper, moved to Ilves. Juuso Riksman, who was part of Ässät's 2006 silver team, was acquired in his place, and Rasmus Rinne of the Mestis team Peliitat became his partner.

There were also big changes in the outfield players, for example in the form of the entire first line leaving. From the attack, Joel Armia left for the Buffalo Sabres' organization, while Veli-Matti Savinainen left for the KHL. Center Stephen Dixon was already sold at the transfer deadline last season. In addition, the experienced Aki Uusikartano did not fit into the formations of the new coaching and thus went to play in Lukko.

=== New signings ===
A lot was expected of the new player Colby Cohen, but he did not adapt to Finland and Pori at all and returned completely unexpectedly back to his homeland. Ässät acquired Dragan Umicevic, familiar from the short visit of the previous season, and Niklas Hagman, a class acquisition by Ässät's standards, as top strikers. Hagman and Umicevic formed a good pair. In addition, Ässät acquired the Slovenian Žiga Jeglič, who was planned for a longer-term project. However, his visit was short-lived because he requested a transfer at the turn of the year. The reason was largely that being stuck in a rather small role in Ässät, which did not help him to be selected to the Slovenian Olympic team, and in the German DEL he would have been better seen by the national team's coaches. Kamil Kreps, who was planned to be the center of the first court, who also played in Kärpät, suffered from injuries throughout the season and otherwise did not meet the expectations placed on him. The number of games for the season was only 39 games for him.

At the end of September, Ässät acquired Swedish defender Alexander Ribbenstrand from the Norwegian GET-ligaen. As expected in advance, the level difference between the Finnish and Norwegian leagues was too great, and Ribbenstrand was of little use to the team. So he was able to continue his journey to the Swedish Allsvenskan after nine matches played without any points. In October, Ässät supplemented its defense with Canadian Danny Groulx. He had played in the previous season in the AHL, but had not played in the beginning of the 2013–2014 season. By profile, Groulx was supposed to be an attacking defenseman with a good shot. However, the lack of playing in the early season showed in his playing, and this lottery also turned out to be empty. In his very first match against Lukko, he was on the field during five back-to-back goals. Groulx had 2 points in 14 matches played. So he too was allowed to go back to his home. At the end of February, Ässät officially announced that they had terminated Groulx's contract.

In addition to Groulx, Ässät acquired the promising big defender Petteri Lindbohm from the Jokerit on a loan deal. Ässät would have kept him, but Jokerit wanted to take him back at the end of November. Lindbohm scored five points in 19 matches in Ässät. In January, 25-year-old winger Austin Smith transferred from the Dallas Stars organization to Ässät on a free loan agreement. Smith's best attribute was his skating speed. However, adapting to the European style of play was a bit of a learning curve.

During the season, four forwards from Ässät's own juniors were promoted to the representative team. Of them, Ville Ahlgren and Juho Lammikko received the most responsibility. In addition, defender Aleksi Laine was able to play the last match of the regular season in the representative team, because at the same time the A-juniors had a match in the first playoff round.

== Regular season ==
After the championship season, Ässät did not manage to continue being successful as the ranking in the regular season was third last after TPS and KalPa. In the end, the score was 67 points. Ässät was 20 points away from the last playoff spot. Ässät collected the second-lowest number of regulation time victories and scored goals, and the second-highest number of regulation losses and goals conceded. On the SM-liiga leaderboard, Ässät's top scorers Niklas Hagman (21+17=38) and Dragan Umicevic (5+33=38) finished 15th and 17th respectively. In the goal leader board, Hagman finished sixth with 21 goals, being tied with Tappara's Josh Green and JYP's Ossi Louhivaara. In the assist leaderboard, Umicevic finished fifth with 33 assist points, tied with Pelicans' Tyler Redenbach. With his 160 penalty minutes, Jyri Marttinen was the top name in the penalty minutes in the entire league.

Ässät beat Lukko in their opening match with clear numbers 4–0. After this, Ässät lost away to TPS and HIFK. The season started with home wins and away losses, as Ässät won the first five home games and lost the first six away games. The rhythm changed around the middle of October, when Ässät beat Pelicans away. In October, Ässät had winning streaks of three and four matches, until a seven-match losing streak began in November. The streak was broken at the end of November, but continued after one win with eight matches. The losing streak wasn't broken again until the next year, when the first three matches of 2014 ended with the Ässät victories. At the end of the season, Ässät played five matches in a row, in which the other team was left without goals. During the streak, Ässät kept HIFK and SaiPa clean at home, but kept clean away against Tappara, Blues and Lukko. The last two matches of the season both ended in crushing losses, when Ässät lost at home to Jokerit 2–7 and away to Pelicans 6–2.

== Player statistics ==
=== Skaters ===
Source: QuantHockey

#	Player	Position	GP	Goals	Assists	Points	+/-	PIM
1.	Niklas Hagman	Forward	44	21	17	38	-3	36
2.	Dragan Umicevic	Forward	52	5	33	38	-2	18
3.	Mika Niemi	Forward	60	7	19	26	-22	32
4.	Sami Lähteenmäki	Forward	46	16	8	24	0	16
5.	Tommi Taimi	Forward	53	7	17	24	+3	40
6.	Henri Heino	Forward	60	13	10	23	-5	20
7.	Sami Mutanen	Forward	60	7	12	19	0	24
8.	Severi Sillanpää	Forward	60	7	9	16	+2	34
9.	Kamil Kreps	Forward	39	5	11	16	-5	20
10.	Ville Uusitalo	Forward	60	2	14	16	-12	46
11.	Eero Elo	Forward	57	8	6	14	-16	16
12.	Austin Smith ^{†}	Forward	28	6	7	13	-5	20
13.	Tuomas Huhtanen	Forward	57	6	7	13	-6	68
14.	Miko Malkamäki	Defence	56	1	11	12	-3	22
15.	Jyri Marttinen	Defence	56	4	7	11	-6	160
16.	Tuomas Pihlman	Forward	35	6	4	10	-15	24
17.	Petteri Lindbohm ^{†}	Defence	19	1	4	5	+3	8
18.	Ville Ahlgren	Forward	31	2	2	4	-4	6
19.	Žiga Jeglič ^{‡}	Forward	32	2	2	4	-1	18
20.	Tapio Sammalkangas	Defence	24	1	3	4	-7	41
21.	Valtteri Parikka	Defence	39	1	3	4	-15	18
22.	Patrik Parkkonen	Defence	23	0	3	3	+1	10
23.	Danny Groulx ^{†‡}	Defence	14	1	1	2	-7	12
24.	Oskari Lehtinen ^{†}	Forward	9	0	2	2	-1	0
25.	Christian Söderström ^{†}	Forward	11	0	2	2	-3	4
26.	Colby Cohen ^{‡}	Defence	5	0	1	1	-2	2
27.	Juho Lammikko	Forward	20	0	1	1	-4	0
28.	Aleksi Laine	Defence	1	0	0	0	-1	0
29.	Niko Ojamäki	Forward	5	0	0	0	0	0
30.	Alexander Ribbenstrand ^{†‡}	Defence	9	0	0	0	-6	4

=== Goaltenders ===
Player	Gp	W	L	SO	GAA	SV%	G	A	PIM
Rasmus Rinne	34	8	20	4	2,55	0.913%	0	1	6
Juuso Riksman	31	8	12	2	3,00	0.903%	0	2	2

^{†}Transferred to Ässät mid-season. Stats reflect time with Ässät only.

^{‡}Transferred to another team mid-season. Stats reflect time with Ässät only.

Bold/italics denotes franchise record
