= 2012–13 Porin Ässät season =

SM-liiga hockey team season

2012–13 Porin Ässät
- SM-liiga champions
- League: 4th SM-liiga
- 2012–13 record: 27–8–5–20
- Home record: 14–3–3–10
- Road record: 13–5–2–10
- Goals for: 160
- Goals against: 130

Team information
- General manager: Mika Toivola
- Coach: Karri Kivi
- Captain: Ville Uusitalo
- Alternate captains: Aki Uusikartano; Jani Honkanen; Stephen Dixon; Tapio Sammalkangas
- Arena: Pori Ice Hall
- Average attendance: 4,556

Team leaders
- Goals: Veli-Matti Savinainen (20)
- Assists: Stephen Dixon (35)
- Points: Stephen Dixon (44)
- Penalty minutes: Jesse Joensuu (84)
- Plus/minus: Ville Uusitalo (+20)
- Wins: Antti Raanta (22)
- Goals against average: Antti Raanta (1,85)

The 2012–13 Porin Ässät season was the club's 37th season in the SM-liiga and the 45th season at the top-level of ice hockey in Finland. Towards the end of the regular season, Ässät won 14 matches in a row and did not miss a single point during the last 16 regular season matches. Ässät finished fourth in the regular season, being only one point away from the 3rd placed JYP. The season eventually ended in Kanada-malja championship celebrations after Ässät beat Tappara Tampere in the finals. The championship was Ässät's third.

== Off-season ==
During the off-season, Porin Ässät signed former NHL and AHL players Michael Ryan and Shaun Heshka. Jesse Joensuu also returned to his youth club as a result of the NHL lockout. Ässät also brought in Daniel Brodin and Dragan Umicevic from the Elitserien. Departures from the club included Kristian Kudroc, Patrick Yetman, Jakub Sindel, Borna Rendulic, Tomas Zaborsky, Ryan Caldwell and Mark Lee, all going into various European leagues.

Joel Armia stayed with Ässät for the season on a loan from the Buffalo Sabres.

== Regular season & playoffs ==
=== Regular season ===
Ässät started their season with two wins by beating both Lukko and TPS 3–0. In the third match, Ässät lost 6–0 to Kärpät. After that, Ässät played with a win-loss-win pace, until both started to come in short bursts. By the end of the year, Ässät was below the playoff line and it had to sell its first line center Stephen Dixon to the KHL. After losing four matches in a row after winning three matches in January 2013, Ässät started a long, 14-match winning streak, during which Ässät conceded only 15 goals. Two of the wins came in extra time. During the winning streak, Ässät only conceded more than two goals in one match, when the Blues scored three goals against Ässät. The winning streak was broken at home with an overtime loss against Kärpät, after which Ässät won its last regular season game away against TPS in overtime. Ässät thus won 15 of their last 16 regular season matches and collected at least one point in each match. The winning streak in question was at the same time the longest winning streak in the club's history and the second longest winning streak in the SM-liiga history together with the Kärpät's winning streak in the 2006–2007 season (14 matches).

=== Playoffs ===
In the quarter-finals, Ässät faced KalPa. Ässät won the first three matches of the series, but lost the fourth match with a score of 5–0. Ässät won the fifth match 3–0 and thus progressed to the semi-finals with a 4–1 series win.

In the semi-finals, Ässät faced JYP. The series largely followed the same pattern as the KalPa series, except that the matches were clearly more even. Beforehand, JYP the favorite to win the series, because in the previous season it had knocked down Ässät in the quarterfinals with a straight win 4–0. However, despite JYP's home advantage, Ässät won the first three matches of the series again, but this time also the first cut-off match proved to be difficult as JYP took the away win with goals 1–2. In the fifth match, Ässät won away with 0–1 goals and advanced to the finals with 1–4 wins. The place in the finals was their first since 2006.

In the finals, Ässät faced the Jukka Rautakorpi coached Tappara. After the first four matches, the series was even 2–2. Tappara narrowly won the opening match in Tampere 2–1 after scoring the winning goal just five seconds before the end of the last period. In the second match, Ässät defeated Tappara at home with clear numbers 5–1. The third match in Tampere was close again, as Tappara equalized with a dominant force in the 53rd minute and scored the winning goal just one second before the end of the match. Tappara won the match 3–2. In the fourth match, Ässät defeated Tappara again with four goals, winning 4–0 at home. The culmination of the series was the fifth match in Tampere. After Tappara's Jarno Koskiranta scored the opening goal at the beginning of the second period, Ässät's Eero Elo tied the match during the same period. In a 1-1 tie, the game went to overtime. Only in the third overtime, at 108:59, Ässät's Veli-Matti Savinainen scored the winning goal of the match and thus Ässät took the first match ball. Tappara still had a chance to take the decision to the seventh match by winning the sixth match in Pori. Ässät won the match with goals 3–2 and thus achieved the Finnish championship with 2–4 wins.

== Player statistics ==
=== Skaters ===
Source: QuantHockey

#	Player	Position	GP	G	A	Pts	+/-	PIM
1.	Stephen Dixon ^{‡}	Forward	44	9	35	44	+10	51
2.	Veli-Matti Savinainen	Forward	46	20	16	36	+7	43
3.	Michael Ryan	Forward	53	18	18	36	+14	54
4.	Joel Armia	Forward	47	19	14	33	+12	32
5.	Mika Niemi	Forward	59	10	21	31	+13	34
6.	Shaun Heshka	Defence	60	8	23	31	+14	26
7.	Jesse Joensuu ^{‡}	Forward	24	11	14	25	+9	83
8.	Aki Uusikartano	Forward	53	11	10	21	+15	16
9.	Daniel Brodin	Forward	60	10	8	18	+5	73
10.	Ville Uusitalo	Defence	59	1	16	17	+20	20
11.	Eero Elo	Forward	31	10	4	14	+5	10
12.	Jyri Marttinen	Defence	56	4	9	13	+5	68
13.	Severi Sillanpää	Forward	60	6	5	11	-2	12
14.	Sami Mutanen	Forward	59	3	8	11	-3	18
15.	Tuomas Pihlman	Forward	53	3	7	10	-3	43
16.	Miko Malkamäki	Defence	51	3	6	9	+9	22
17.	Tapio Sammalkangas	Defence	56	1	8	9	+17	38
18.	Sami Lähteenmäki	Forward	41	5	3	8	+11	12
19.	Nico Aaltonen	Forward	35	2	5	7	+6	8
20.	Tommi Taimi	Defence	28	1	6	7	+4	12
21.	Dragan Umicevic ^{‡}	Forward	9	1	5	6	+2	0
22.	Patrik Parkkonen	Defence	15	0	4	4	+4	8
23.	Aki Juusela	Forward	32	1	1	2	0	2
24.	Patrik Moisio	Forward	6	0	1	1	0	4
25.	Jani Honkanen	Defence	35	0	1	1	0	30
26.	Samuli Virkkunen	Forward	1	0	0	0	-1	0
27.	Jesse Huhtala	Forward	6	0	0	0	-1	0

=== Goaltenders ===
Player	Gp	W	L	SO	GAA	SV%	G	A	PIM
Antti Raanta	45	21	10	5	1,85	94,3%	0	2	0
Juha Järvenpää	18	6	10	2	2,56	92,2%	0	2	0

^{†}Transferred to Ässät mid-season. Stats reflect time with Ässät only.

^{‡}Transferred to another team mid-season. Stats reflect time with Ässät only.

Bold/italics denotes franchise record

== Awards and honours ==
Player	Award	Ref.
Antti Raanta	Lasse Oksanen trophy (Most Valuable Player)	
Antti Raanta	Jari Kurri Trophy (Playoffs MVP)	
Antti Raanta	Urpo Ylönen trophy (Goaltender of the year)	
Aki Uusikartano	Raimo Kilpiö trophy (Gentleman of the year)	
Karri Kivi (coach)	Kalevi Numminen trophy (Coach of the year)	
Shaun Heshka	Pekka Rautakallio trophy (Defenceman of the year)	
Shaun Heshka & Antti Raanta	SM-liiga All-Star team	

== See also ==
- History of Porin Ässät (men's ice hockey)
- 2012–13 SM-liiga season
