= Juha =

Juha is a masculine given name of Finnish origin derived from Johannes (or John in English language contexts). Notable people with the name include:

- Juha Alén, Finnish ice hockey player
- Juha Gustafsson, Finnish ice hockey player
- Juha Hakola, Finnish association footballer
- Juha Harju, Finnish singer
- Juha Haukkala, Finnish freestyle skier
- Juha Hautamäki, Finnish speedway rider
- Juha Helppi, Finnish poker player
- Juha Hernesniemi, Finnish neurosurgeon and professor
- Juha Hirvi, Finnish sport shooter
- Juha Hurme, Finnish playwright, director and writer
- Juha Ikonen, Finnish ice hockey player
- Juha Isolehto, Finnish high jumper
- Juha Janhunen, Finnish linguist
- Juha Jokela, Finnish playwright and scriptwriter
- Juha Järvenpää, Finnish ice hockey player
- Juha Kankkunen, Finnish former rally driver
- Juha Kaunismäki, Finnish-born Norwegian ice hockey defenseman
- Juha Kilpiä, Finnish diplomat and former military officer
- Juha Kivi, Finnish long jumper
- Juha Kylmänen, Finnish singer
- Juha Lallukka, Finnish cross-country skier
- Juha Laukkanen, Finnish javelin thrower
- Juha Leimu, Finnish ice hockey player
- Juha Leiviskä, Finnish architect
- Juha Leskinen, Finnish band member of Twilightning
- Juha Lind, Finnish ice hockey player
- Juha Malinen, Finnish football manager
- Juha Mannerkorpi, Finnish writer
- Juha Metsola, Finnish ice hockey player
- Juha Metsäperä, Finnish singer and songwriter
- Juha Mieto, Finnish cross-country skier and politician
- Juha Pajuoja, Finnish ice hockey player
- Juha Pasoja, Finnish footballer
- Juha Pekka Alanen, Finnish record producer
- Juha Peltola, Finnish orienteer
- Juha Pentikäinen, Finnish university professor and folklorist
- Juha Pirinen, Finnish footballer
- Juha Pitkämäki, Finnish ice hockey player
- Juha Plosila, Finnish long jumper
- Juha Rantasila, Finnish ice hockey player
- Juha Rehula, Finnish politician
- Juha Reini, Finnish footballer
- Juha Riihijärvi, Finnish ice hockey player
- Juha Riippa, Finnish footballer
- Juha Ruusuvuori, Finnish writer
- Juha Salminen, Finnish motorcycle racer
- Juha Salo, Finnish rally driver
- Juha Sihvola, Finnish historian and philosopher
- Juha Sipilä, Finnish politician and 44th Prime Minister of Finland
- Juha Soukiala, Finnish footballer
- Juha Suoranta, Finnish scientist
- Juha Tapio, Finnish musician
- Juha K. Tapio, Finnish writer and critic
- Juha Tiainen, Finnish athletics competitor
- Juha Toivonen, Finnish ice hockey player
- Juha Tuomi, Finnish footballer
- Juha Turunen, Finnish lawyer and convicted felon
- Juha Uotila, Finnish ice hockey player
- Juha Väätäinen, Finnish athlete, teacher, painter and politician
- Juha Vainio, Finnish lyricist, singer, composer and teacher
- Juha Valjakkala, Finnish murderer
- Juha Valkama, Finnish ice dancer
- Juha Varto, Finnish philosopher
- Juha Widing, Swedish ice hockey player
- Juha Ylönen, Finnish ice hockey player

== See also ==
- Juha-Matti Räsänen
- Juha-Matti Ruuskanen
- Juhamatti Aaltonen
- Juha-Pekka Haataja
- Juha-Pekka Hytönen
- Juha-Pekka Inkeröinen
- Juha-Pekka "JP" Leppäluoto
- Juha-Pekka Pietilä
- Juha-Petteri Purolinna
- Juha (character), a character from Arabic folklore
