= 2014 World Junior Ice Hockey Championships rosters =

== Group A ==
=== Canada ===
- Head coach: (Canada) Brent Sutter

Pos.	No.	Player	Team	NHL Rights
GK	31	Zach Fucale	(Canada) Halifax Mooseheads	Montreal Canadiens
GK	1	Jake Paterson	(United States) Saginaw Spirit	Detroit Red Wings
D	3	Chris Bigras	(Canada) Owen Sound Attack	Colorado Avalanche
D	24	Matt Dumba	(United States) Minnesota Wild	Minnesota Wild
D	5	Aaron Ekblad	(Canada) Barrie Colts	Draft-Eligible 2014
D	7	Josh Morrissey	(Canada) Prince Albert Raiders	Winnipeg Jets
D	2	Adam Pelech	(United States) Erie Otters	New York Islanders
D	15	Derrick Pouliot	(United States) Portland Winterhawks	Pittsburgh Penguins
D	8	Griffin Reinhart	(Canada) Edmonton Oil Kings	New York Islanders
F	25	Josh Anderson	(Canada) London Knights	Columbus Blue Jackets
F	27	Jonathan Drouin	(Canada) Halifax Mooseheads	Tampa Bay Lightning
F	22	Frédérik Gauthier	(Canada) Rimouski Océanic	Toronto Maple Leafs
F	11	Bo Horvat	(Canada) London Knights	Vancouver Canucks
F	10	Charles Hudon	(Canada) Chicoutimi Saguenéens	Montreal Canadiens
F	21	Scott Laughton	(Canada) Oshawa Generals	Philadelphia Flyers
F	26	Curtis Lazar	(Canada) Edmonton Oil Kings	Ottawa Senators
F	14	Taylor Leier	(United States) Portland Winterhawks	Philadelphia Flyers
F	28	Anthony Mantha	(Canada) Val-d'Or Foreurs	Detroit Red Wings
F	17	Connor McDavid	(United States) Erie Otters	Draft-Eligible 2015
F	19	Nic Petan	(United States) Portland Winterhawks	Winnipeg Jets
F	23	Sam Reinhart	(Canada) Kootenay Ice	Draft-Eligible 2014
F	16	Kerby Rychel	(Canada) Guelph Storm	Columbus Blue Jackets

=== Czech Republic ===
- Head coach: (Czech Republic) Miroslav Přerost

Pos.	No.	Player	Team	NHL Rights
GK	2	Daniel Dolejš	(Czech Republic) Vítkovice Steel
GK	30	Dominik Hrachovina	(Finland) Tappara
GK	1	Marek Langhamer	(Canada) Medicine Hat Tigers	Phoenix Coyotes
D	6	Ronald Knot	(Czech Republic) Slavia Prague
D	29	Jan Košťálek	(Canada) Rimouski Océanic	Winnipeg Jets
D	12	Patrik Marcel	(Czech Republic) HC Plzeň
D	4	David Němeček	(Canada) Saskatoon Blades
D	27	Michal Plutnar	(United States) Tri-City Americans
D	11	Petr Šidlík	(Canada) Victoriaville Tigres
D	7	Libor Šulák	(Czech Republic) Piráti Chomutov
F	16	Radek Faksa	(Canada) Kitchener Rangers	Dallas Stars
F	21	Jiří Fronk	(Czech Republic) HC Energie Karlovy Vary (MHL)
F	25	Ondřej Kaše	(Czech Republic) Piráti Chomutov	dem
F	10	David Kämpf	(Czech Republic) Piráti Chomutov
F	17	Patrik Machač	(Czech Republic) HC Kladno
F	9	David Pastrňák	(Sweden) Södertälje SK	Draft-Eligible 2014
F	28	Martin Procházka	(Czech Republic) Sparta Prague
F	5	Pavel Sedláček	(Czech Republic) PSG Zlín
F	20	Dominik Simon	(Czech Republic) Sparta Prague
F	18	Vojtěch Tomeček	(Czech Republic) HC Energie Karlovy Vary
F	24	Dominik Volek	(Canada) Red Deer Rebels
F	15	Jakub Vrána	(Sweden) Linköpings HC	Draft-Eligible 2014
F	13	Pavel Zacha	(Czech Republic) Bílí Tygři Liberec	Draft-Eligible 2015

=== Germany ===
- Head coach: (Germany) Ernst Höfner

Pos.	No.	Player	Team	NHL Rights
GK	1	Marvin Cüpper	(Canada) Shawinigan Cataractes
GK	29	Patrick Klein	(Germany) Füchse Duisburg
GK	30	Kevin Reich	(Austria) Red Bull Salzburg (MHL)
D	3	Tim Bender	(Canada) London Knights
D	5	Thomas Botzenhardt	(Germany) EV Füssen
D	18	Janik Möser	(United States) Muskegon Lumberjacks
D	14	Jonas Noske	(Germany) Düsseldorfer EG
D	12	Dorian Saeftel	(Germany) Adler Mannheim
D	16	Fabio Wagner	(Germany) EV Landshut
F	15	Leon Draisaitl	(Canada) Prince Albert Raiders	Draft-Eligible 2014
F	11	Markus Eisenschmid	(Canada) Medicine Hat Tigers
F	27	Vladislav Filin	(Germany) FASS Berlin (Ger-3)
F	13	Kai Herpich	(Germany) EHC Red Bull München
F	21	Dominik Kahun	(Canada) Sudbury Wolves
F	25	Maximilian Kammerer	(Canada) Regina Pats
F	24	Patrick Klöpper	(Germany) Krefeld Pinguine
F	8	Lukas Laub	(United States) Odessa Jackalopes
F	22	Lennart Palausch	(United States) Aberdeen Wings
F	17	Frederik Tiffels	(United States) Cedar Rapids RoughRiders
F	6	Parker Tuomie	(United States) Wenatchee Wild
F	20	Sven Ziegler	(Germany) Eisbären Berlin

=== Slovakia ===
- Head coach: (Slovakia) Ernest Bokroš

Pos.	No.	Player	Team	NHL Rights
GK	1	Samuel Baroš	(Slovakia) HK Orange 20
GK	2	Denis Godla	(Slovakia) Slovan Bratislava
GK	30	Richard Sabol	(Slovakia) HK Orange 20
D	14	Erik Černák	(Slovakia) HK Orange 20
D	27	Ľubomír Dinda	(Slovakia) HK Orange 20
D	19	Daniel Gachulinec	(Slovakia) HK Orange 20
D	6	Martin Kečkeš	(Czech Republic) HC Energie Karlovy Vary (MHL)
D	4	Patrik Luža	(Slovakia) HK Orange 20
D	7	Jakub Predajnianský	(Slovakia) HK Orange 20
D	13	Tomáš Rusina	(Slovakia) HK Orange 20
D	5	Michal Valjent	(Slovakia) HK Orange 20
F	22	Peter Cehlárik	(Sweden) Luleå HF	Boston Bruins
F	20	Marko Daňo	(Slovakia) Slovan Bratislava	Columbus Blue Jackets
F	12	Dávid Gríger	(Czech Republic) HC Energie Karlovy Vary (MHL)
F	21	Stanislav Horanský	(Slovakia) HK Orange 20
F	9	Milan Kolena	(Slovakia) HK Orange 20
F	15	Mário Lunter	(Slovakia) HC ’05 Banská Bystrica
F	18	Dávid Minárik	(Slovakia) HK Orange 20
F	26	Filip Mlynčár	(Slovakia) HK Orange 20
F	10	Martin Réway	(Canada) Gatineau Olympiques	Montreal Canadiens
F	17	Eduard Šimun	(Slovakia) HK Orange 20
F	28	Pavol Skalický	(Slovakia) HK Orange 20
F	25	Jozef Tibenský	(Slovakia) HK Orange 20

=== United States ===
- Head coach: (United States) Don Lucia

Pos.	No.	Player	Team	NHL Rights
GK	35	Thatcher Demko	(United States) Boston College
GK	32	Jon Gillies	(United States) Providence College	Calgary Flames
GK	29	Anthony Stolarz	(Canada) London Knights	Philadelphia Flyers
D	4	Will Butcher	(United States) University of Denver	Colorado Avalanche
D	28	Connor Carrick	(United States) Hershey Bears	Washington Capitals
D	7	Matt Grzelcyk	(United States) Boston University	Boston Bruins
D	3	Ian McCoshen	(United States) Boston College	Florida Panthers
D	16	Steve Santini	(United States) Boston College	New Jersey Devils
D	2	Brady Skjei	(United States) University of Minnesota	New York Rangers
D	6	Jaccob Slavin	(United States) Colorado College	Carolina Hurricanes
F	11	Riley Barber	(United States) Miami University	Washington Capitals
F	9	Andrew Copp	(United States) University of Michigan	Winnipeg Jets
F	14	Thomas DiPauli	(United States) University of Notre Dame	Washington Capitals
F	15	Jack Eichel	(United States) Boston University	Draft-Eligible 2015
F	19	Adam Erne	(Canada) Quebec Remparts	Tampa Bay Lightning
F	22	Hudson Fasching	(United States) University of Minnesota	Los Angeles Kings
F	21	Ryan Hartman	(United States) Plymouth Whalers	Chicago Blackhawks
F	13	Vince Hinostroza	(United States) University of Notre Dame	Chicago Blackhawks
F	17	Nicolas Kerdiles	(United States) University of Wisconsin	Anaheim Ducks
F	23	Stefan Matteau	(United States) Albany Devils	New Jersey Devils
F	10	Danny O'Regan	(United States) Boston University	San Jose Sharks
F	25	Quentin Shore	(United States) University of Denver	Ottawa Senators
F	26	Zach Stepan	(United States) Minnesota State University, Mankato	Nashville Predators

== Group B ==
=== Finland ===
- Head coach: (Finland) Karri Kivi

Pos.	No.	Player	Team	NHL Rights
GK	30	Ville Husso	(Finland) HIFK
GK	1	Janne Juvonen	(Finland) Lahti Pelicans	Nashville Predators
GK	31	Juuse Saros	(Finland) HPK	Nashville Predators
D	9	Julius Honka	(Canada) Swift Current Broncos	Draft-Eligible 2014
D	4	Mikko Lehtonen	(Finland) TuTo
D	7	Esa Lindell	(Finland) Jokerit	Dallas Stars
D	3	Valtteri Parikka	(Finland) Ässät
D	12	Ville Pokka	(Finland) Oulun Kärpät	New York Islanders
D	5	Rasmus Ristolainen	(United States) Rochester Americans	Buffalo Sabres
D	15	Juuso Vainio	(Finland) HPK
D	23	Mikko Vainonen	(Canada) Kingston Frontenacs	Nashville Predators
F	25	Henrik Haapala	(Finland) Tappara
F	22	Henri Ikonen	(Canada) Kingston Frontenacs	Tampa Bay Lightning
F	10	Juuso Ikonen	(Finland) JYP Jyväskylä
F	18	Saku Kinnunen	(Finland) KalPa
F	26	Rasmus Kulmala	(Finland) HC TPS
F	28	Artturi Lehkonen	(Finland) KalPa	Montreal Canadiens
F	13	Ville-Valtteri Leskinen	(Finland) Peliitat Heinola
F	21	Aleksi Mustonen	(Finland) Jokerit
F	8	Saku Mäenalanen	(Finland) Jokipojat	Nashville Predators
F	11	Joni Nikko	(Finland) Lukko
F	29	Otto Rauhala	(Finland) LeKi
F	20	Teuvo Teräväinen	(Finland) Jokerit	Chicago Blackhawks

=== Norway ===
- Head coach: (Norway) Ørjan Løvdal

Pos.	No.	Player	Team	NHL Rights
GK	25	Henrik Haukeland	(Norway) Stjernen Hockey
GK	1	Joachim Svendsen	(Norway) Lørenskog IK
D	12	Magnus Eikrem Haugen	(Norway) Storhamar Dragons
D	6	Andreas Klavestad	(Norway) Frisk Asker Ishockey
D	7	Erlend Lesund	(Norway) Sparta Warriors
D	4	Tallak Lyngset	(United States) Islanders Hockey Club (USPHL)
D	2	Mattias Nørstebø	(Sweden) Brynäs IF (J20)
D	23	Christer Simonsen	(Norway) Manglerud Star Ishockey
D	3	Martin Vaakanainen	(Sweden) Tingsryds AIF
F	11	Magnus Fischer	(Norway) Vålerenga Ishockey
F	26	Anders Henriksen	(Norway) Stavanger Oilers
F	10	Ludvig Hoff	(United States) Lincoln Stars
F	14	Tim-Robin Johnsgård	(Sweden) Mariestad BoIS HC
F	28	Jørgen Karterud	(Canada) Sault Ste. Marie Greyhounds
F	27	Endre Medby	(Norway) Lillehammer IK
F	21	Simen Nielsen	(Norway) Lørenskog IK
F	18	Magnus Nilsen	(Norway) Sparta Warriors
F	13	Christoffer Rasch	(Sweden) Mora IK
F	19	Martin Rønnild	(Sweden) Brynäs IF (J20)
F	15	Didrik Svendsen	(Norway) Sparta Warriors
F	22	Markus Søberg	(Sweden) Frölunda HC (J20)	Columbus Blue Jackets
F	16	Jens Henrik Tönjum	(Sweden) Växjö Lakers (J20)

=== Russia ===
- Head coach: (Russia) Mikhail Varnakov

Pos.	No.	Player	Team	NHL Rights
GK	20	Ivan Nalimov	(Russia) SKA-1946 (MHL)
GK	1	Igor Ustinsky	(Russia) Stalnye Lisy (MHL)
GK	30	Andrei Vasilevski	(Russia) Salavat Yulaev Ufa	Tampa Bay Lightning
D	5	Alexei Bereglazov	(Russia) Stalnye Lisy (MHL)
D	4	Ilya Lyubushkin	(Russia) Lokomotiv Yaroslavl
D	7	Kirill Maslov	(Russia) Loko Yaroslavl (MHL)
D	22	Andrei Mironov	(Russia) Dynamo Moscow
D	2	Nikita Tryamkin	(Russia) Avtomobilist Yekaterinburg
D	6	Valeri Vasilyev	(Russia) Spartak Moscow	Philadelphia Flyers
D	16	Nikita Zadorov	(Canada) London Knights	Buffalo Sabres
F	21	Alexander Barabanov	(Russia) VMF Karelia
F	12	Ivan Barbashev	(Canada) Moncton Wildcats
F	19	Pavel Buchnevich	(Russia) Severstal Cherepovets	New York Rangers
F	8	Georgi Busarov	(Russia) Dizel Penza
F	17	Eduard Gimatov	(Russia) MHC Avto (MHL)
F	25	Mikhail Grigorenko	(United States) Buffalo Sabres	Buffalo Sabres
F	27	Vadim Khlopotov	(Russia) Lokomotiv Yaroslavl
F	14	Vyacheslav Osnovin	(Russia) Traktor Chelyabinsk
F	18	Nikolai Skladnichenko	(Russia) Kuznetskie Medvedi (MHL)
F	9	Anton Slepyshev	(Russia) Salavat Yulaev Ufa	Edmonton Oilers
F	10	Bogdan Yakimov	(Russia) Neftekhimik Nizhnekamsk	Edmonton Oilers
F	11	Damir Zhafyarov	(Russia) Metallurg Novokuznetsk
F	23	Valentin Zykov	(Canada) Baie-Comeau Drakkar	Los Angeles Kings

=== Sweden ===
- Head coach: (Sweden) Rikard Grönborg

Pos.	No.	Player	Team	NHL Rights
GK	35	Oscar Dansk	(United States) Erie Otters	Columbus Blue Jackets
GK	1	Marcus Högberg	(Sweden) Mora IK	Ottawa Senators
GK	30	Jonas Johansson	(Sweden) Brynäs IF (J20)
D	8	Linus Arnesson	(Sweden) Djurgårdens IF	Boston Bruins
D	20	Lukas Bengtsson	(Sweden) Mora IK
D	4	Christian Djoos	(Sweden) Brynäs IF	Washington Capitals
D	14	Robert Hägg	(Sweden) Modo Hockey	Philadelphia Flyers
D	3	Robin Norell	(Sweden) Djurgårdens IF	Chicago Blackhawks
D	13	Gustav Olofsson	(United States) Colorado College	Minnesota Wild
D	6	Jesper Pettersson	(Sweden) Linköpings HC
F	18	André Burakovsky	(United States) Erie Otters	Washington Capitals
F	15	Sebastian Collberg	(Sweden) Frölunda HC	Montreal Canadiens
F	9	Jacob de la Rose	(Sweden) Leksands IF	Montreal Canadiens
F	16	Filip Forsberg	(United States) Nashville Predators	Nashville Predators
F	5	Andreas Johnsson	(Sweden) Frölunda HC	Toronto Maple Leafs
F	26	Erik Karlsson	(Sweden) Frölunda HC	Carolina Hurricanes
F	27	Anton Karlsson	(Sweden) Frölunda HC (J20)
F	19	Elias Lindholm	(United States) Carolina Hurricanes	Carolina Hurricanes
F	29	Oskar Sundqvist	(Sweden) Skellefteå AIK	Pittsburgh Penguins
F	23	Nick Sörensen	(Canada) Quebec Remparts	Anaheim Ducks
F	28	Lucas Wallmark	(Sweden) Luleå HF
F	10	Alexander Wennberg	(Sweden) Frölunda HC	Columbus Blue Jackets

=== Switzerland ===
- Head coach: (Canada) Colin Muller

Pos.	No.	Player	Team	NHL Rights
GK	20	Daniel Guntern	(Switzerland) GCK Lions
GK	1	Melvin Nyffeler	(Switzerland) ZSC Lions
GK	30	Sascha Rochow	(Switzerland) SC Bern (U20)
D	4	Phil Baltisberger	(Canada) Guelph Storm
D	6	Lukas Frick	(Switzerland) Kloten Flyers
D	7	Benoît Jecker	(Switzerland) EHC Biel
D	9	Sämi Kreis	(Switzerland) EHC Basel
D	5	Mirco Müller	(United States) Everett Silvertips	San Jose Sharks
D	29	Claude-Curdin Paschoud	(Switzerland) HC Davos
D	27	Yannick Rathgeb	(United States) Plymouth Whalers
D	12	Anthony Rouiller	(Switzerland) EHC Basel
F	28	Lukas Balmelli	(Switzerland) HC Thurgau
F	22	Nico Dünner	(Switzerland) EV Zug
F	23	Kevin Fiala	(Sweden) HV71 (J20)	Draft-Eligible 2014
F	26	Jason Fuchs	(Canada) Rouyn-Noranda Huskies
F	15	Fabrice Herzog	(Canada) Quebec Remparts	Toronto Maple Leafs
F	21	Marco Müller	(Switzerland) EHC Basel
F	10	Vincent Praplan	(Canada) North Bay Battalion
F	19	Flavio Schmutz	(Sweden) Västerås IK (J20)
F	13	Julian Schmutz	(Switzerland) EHC Basel
F	17	Lukas Sieber	(Switzerland) HC Davos
F	25	Dario Simion	(Switzerland) HC Lugano
F	16	Sandro Zangger	(Switzerland) ZSC Lions
