= Parikka =

Parikka is a Finnish surname. Notable people with the surname include:

- Jalmari Parikka (1891–1959), Finnish revolutionary soldier, actor and artistic director
- Lauri Parikka (1895–1965), Finnish painter
- Pekka Parikka (1939–1997), Finnish film director and screenwriter
- Jussi Parikka (born 1976), Finnish new media theorist
- Jarno Parikka (born 1986), Finnish footballer
- Valtteri Parikka (born 1994), Finnish ice hockey defenceman
