= Honkanen =

Honkanen is a Finnish surname. Notable people with the surname include:

- Veikko Honkanen (1908–1999), Finnish politician
- Tauno Honkanen (1927–2023), Finnish skier
- Raimo Honkanen (1938–2020), Finnish cyclist
- Jakke Honkanen (born 1960), Finnish rally driver
- Jani Honkanen (born 1979), Finnish ice hockey player
- Jenni Honkanen (born 1980), Finnish sprint canoeist
- Manu Honkanen (born 1996), Finnish ice hockey player
- Riikka Honkanen (born 1998), Finnish alpine ski racer
