= Huhtala =

Huhtala is a Finnish surname. Notable people with the surname include:

- Harri Huhtala (born 1952), Finnish hammer thrower
- Jesse Huhtala (ice hockey) (born 1993), Finnish ice hockey player
- Martti Huhtala (1918–2005), Finnish Nordic combined skier
- Mikko Huhtala (born 1952), Finnish wrestler
- Santtu Huhtala (born 1992), Finnish ice hockey player
- Teemu Huhtala (born 1991), Finnish ice hockey player
- Tommi Huhtala (born 1987), Finnish ice hockey player
- Väinö Huhtala (1935–2016), Finnish cross-country skier
