= Jesse Huhtala =

Jesse Huhtala may refer to:

- Jesse Huhtala (ice hockey), Finnish ice hockey player
- Jesse Huhtala (footballer), Finnish footballer
