= Tuomi =

Tuomi is a Finnish surname.

== Geographical distribution ==
As of 2014, 74.5% of all known bearers of the surname Tuomi were residents of Finland (frequency 1:1,686), 12.3% of the United States (1:668,984), 4.3% of Canada (1:196,781), 3.8% of Sweden (1:58,963), 1.5% of Russia (1:2,219,864) and 1.5% of Australia (1:371,467).

In Finland, the frequency of the surname was higher than national average (1:1,686) in the following regions:

1. Southwest Finland (1:720)
2. Päijänne Tavastia (1:826)
3. Satakunta (1:886)
4. Tavastia Proper (1:1,177)
5. Pirkanmaa (1:1,405)
6. Uusimaa (1:1,514)

== People ==
- Ilkka Tuomi (born 1958), Finnish computer scientist
- Juha Tuomi (born 1989), Finnish footballer
- Lempi Tuomi (1882–1958), Finnish politician
- Liisa Tuomi (1924–1989), Finnish actress
- Steven Tuomi (1962–1987), American murder victim of Jeffrey Dahmer
- Matias Tuomi (born 1985), Finnish squash player
- Mikko Tuomi, Finnish astronomer
- Olavi Tuomi (1932–2006), Finnish cinematographer
- Rauli Tuomi (1919–1949), Finnish actor
- Tanja Tuomi (born 1996), Finnish tennis player

== See also ==
- Petri Tuomi-Nikula (born 1951), Finnish diplomat
