= Matti Kuparinen =

Finnish ice hockey player

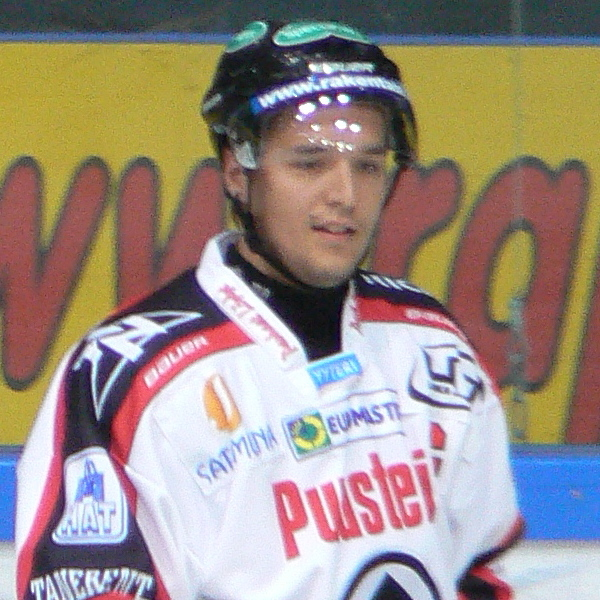
- Kuparinen with HC Ässät in 2009.
- Born: October 16, 1984 (age 41) Pori, Finland
- Height: 180 cm (5 ft 11 in)
- Weight: 94 kg (207 lb; 14 st 11 lb)
- Position: Centre
- Shot: Right
- Played for: KalPa; Avangard Omsk; IFK Helsingfors; HC Ässät Pori; HC Bolzano
- National team: Finland
- Playing career: 2003–2019

Matti Tapani Kuparinen (born 16 October 1984) is a Finnish former ice hockey player who played as a centre. He played in the Finnish Elite League for HC Ässät Pori, Kalevan Pallo, and IFK Helsingfors in a total of 616 regular-season games with 253 points and 59 playoff and regulation games with 28 points. Kuparinen served as the captain of his youth club HC Ässät from 2007 to 2011 and from 2016 to 2018. He won the Finnish Elite League silver medal with the team in 2006. Kuparinen also played one season in the Kontinental Hockey League (KHL) with Avangard Omsk and EBEL with HC Bolzano. He was known for his playing style as a two-way centre.

== Career ==
=== HC Ässät (2002–2011) ===
Kuparinen's youth club is his hometown team, HC Ässät. Kuparinen was a part of the Ässät U20 team that got promoted from the I-Division to the U20 SM-sarja level for the 2002–03 season. In the 2003–04 season, Kuparinen was the team's second-best scorer with Tuomas Takala, having scored 21 points in 20 regular-season games. He also made his debut in the Finnish Elite League team in the same season, where Kuparinen scored five points in 36 regular-season games. He made his league debut on 25 October 2003 away against derby opponent Rauman Lukko. Kuparinen also scored the opening goal of his professional career against Lukko on 17 January 2004. He played his season mainly in the HC Ässät fourth line. Kuparinen also played three Mestis matches for the under-20 national team. In April 2004, Kuparinen signed a two-year contract extension with HC Ässät.

Kuparinen's 2004–05 season was hampered by a knee injury he suffered in November 2004. Kuparinen was without any points in 25 regular-season matches he played, and he spent most of his spring season with the U20 team. In the 2005–06 season. However, Kuparinen managed to take the step expected of him in the previous season, and he formed the HC Ässät's effective fourth line with Juha Kiilholma and Patrik Forsbacka. Their greatest successes were seen especially in the spring. Kuparinen scored 13 points in all 56 matches of the regular season and six points in 14 playoff matches. The first playoff goal of his career decided the second semi-final match against Oulun Kärpät, which ended in a 3–1 victory for HC Ässät. Kuparinen also got an assist in the game. He was awarded Ilta-Sanomat's second star of the match. Kuparinen and Ässät won the Finnish Championship silver medal at the end of the season. In February 2006, he signed another two-year contract extension with HC Ässät.

In the 2006–07 season, Kuparinen was assigned as an alternate captain of the HC Ässät. He started the season in the team's fourth line, but during the season, he also received playing time in the first line, where Kuparinen brought defensive responsibility. He scored 21 points in the regular season and also collected 137 penalty minutes, which placed Kuparinen eighth in the league. In January 2007, his contract with HC Ässät was extended by one year. In the middle of the 2007–08 season, in October 2007, Kuparinen became the team captain when Pasi Peltonen gave up his role.

In the 2008–09 season, Kuparinen scored 28 points in 49 regular-season games. He was HC Ässät's third-highest scorer, along with Derek Damon. Kuparinen's season was hampered for a few weeks by a broken rib in January 2009. He also shared the 2009 league qualifiers' lead in points with Severi Sillanpää, with scores of six points. In February 2009, Kuparinen signed a one-year extension with the HC Ässät. In the 2009–10 season, he played only 32 regular-season games due to knee injuries, and in them, he scored 21 points. In January 2010, Ässät signed a one-year extension with him. In the 2010–11 season, Kuparinen played his best season in terms of points for Ässät. He scored 37 points, along with the team's third-highest scorer, Aki Uusikartano.

=== KalPa, trade to Omsk and HIFK (2011–2015) ===
Kuparinen continued his career with a two-year contract to Kalevan Pallo in the 2011–12 season. He set his career high with 43 points in the regular season. However, his scoring rate slowed slightly towards the end of the season, and Kuparinen did not score a goal after 10 January 2012. He was chosen as the SM-liiga's Player of the Month for October 2011. In November 2011, Kuparinen extended his contract with KalPa for three years until spring 2015.

In the 2012–13 season, Kuparinen became KalPa's alternate captain. He played only eight regular-season games, after which KalPa sold Kuparinen to the Kontinental Hockey League (KHL) team Avangard Omsk in October 2012. However, after the first season, in July 2013, the club terminated his contract, as Omsk head coach Petri Matikainen did not see a use for Kuparinen in his plans for the upcoming season. In the same month, he signed a one-year contract with IFK Helsingfors. Due to injuries, Kuparinen played in only 12 regular-season games and one playoff game during the season, scoring three points. In May 2014, HIFK extended his contract by a year.

=== Return to HC Ässät and retirement in Bolzano (2015–2019) ===
Kuparinen returned to his youth club HC Ässät Pori for the 2015–16 season on a two-year contract. However, in the summer of 2015, a blood clot was found in his calf, which kept Kuparinen on the sidelines until December. He ultimately played only 24 regular-season games during the season. Kuparinen was named the HC Ässät captain for the 2016–17 season. He was the team's top point scorer and goalscorer in the first round of the playoffs against Tampereen Ilves, having scored three points in three games. In the first game of the series on 15 March 2017, Kuparinen scored the winning goal for HC Ässät in the first overtime period. He also received an assist on Ville Korhonen's power play goal. However, Ilves eventually won the series and advanced to the quarterfinals with a 2–1 win. In February 2017, Kuparinen signed a one-year contract extension with Ässät.

The 2017–18 season would be his last at the club. In 56 regular-season games, Kuparinen scored 21 points. He additionally played 6 playoff matches with Ässät. For the 2018–19 season, Kuparinen signed a one-year contract with the Italian team HC Bolzano of the international Erste Bank Eishockey Liga. Kuparinen played 53 games for Bolzano and scored 12 points. In September 2019, he announced his retirement on his Twitter account.

After his playing career, Kuparinen has worked with HC Ässät U18 as an assistant coach for the 2020–21 season and as HC Ässät's physical therapist since 2024.

== International play ==
Matti Kuparinen represented Finland at the 2011–12 Euro Hockey Tour.

== Personal life ==
Kuparinen was born in Pori, Finland, on October 16, 1984. His father, Risto Kuparinen, was an ice hockey influencer. He served as the manager of the HC Ässät junior teams and as the Ässät CEO during the 2002–03 season. He also held various positions in the Finnish Ice Hockey Association. Risto died on 27 January 2020. Kuparinen's older sister, Anne Kuparinen, was the chairman of Porin Ässät ry, in charge of HC Ässät's junior teams.

== Career statistics ==
=== Regular season and playoffs ===
			Regular season					Playoffs
Season	Team	League	GP	G	A	Pts	PIM	GP	G	A	Pts	PIM
2003–04	HC Ässät	SML	36	1	4	5	24	—	—	—	—	—
2004–05	HC Ässät	SML	25	0	0	0	16	—	—	—	—	—
2005–06	HC Ässät	SML	56	4	9	13	54	14	2	4	6	6
2006–07	HC Ässät	SML	54	5	16	21	137	—	—	—	—	—
2007–08	HC Ässät	SML	52	2	14	16	93	—	—	—	—	—
2008–09	HC Ässät	SML	49	13	15	28	62	—	—	—	—	—
2009–10	HC Ässät	SML	32	5	16	21	36	—	—	—	—	—
2010–11	HC Ässät	SML	60	11	26	37	52	6	2	1	3	18
2011–12	KalPa	SML	55	10	33	43	75	—	—	—	—	—
2012–13	KalPa	SML	8	2	5	7	6	—	—	—	—	—
2012–13	Avangard Omsk	KHL	30	3	5	8	36	12	0	0	0	4
2013–14	HIFK	Liiga	12	1	2	3	6	1	0	0	0	2
2014–15	HIFK	Liiga	48	8	8	16	59	8	0	1	1	2
2015–16	HC Ässät	Liiga	24	2	6	8	6	—	—	—	—	—
2016–17	HC Ässät	Liiga	49	5	9	14	59	3	2	1	3	0
2017–18	HC Ässät	Liiga	56	5	16	21	26	6	2	2	4	0
2018–19	HC Bolzano	EBEL	53	3	9	12	36	5	0	0	0	0
SM-liiga / Liiga totals			616	74	179	253	711	45	8	11	19	32

Sporting positions
Preceded by Juha Kiilholma	Porin Ässät captain 2016–18	Succeeded by Tommi Taimi
Preceded by Pasi Peltonen	Porin Ässät captain 2007–11	Succeeded by Ville Uusitalo
