= Parkkinen =

Parkkinen is a Finnish surname. Notable people with the surname include:

- Keijo Parkkinen (born 1965), Finnish orienteering competitor
- Lassi Parkkinen (1917–1994), Finnish speed skater
- Sulo Parkkinen (1930–2013), Finnish footballer

== See also ==
- Parkkonen
