= Patrik Forsbacka =

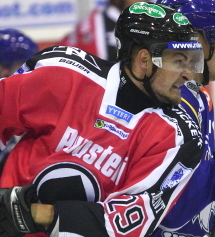
- Forsbacka with Ässät
- Born: August 12, 1982 (age 43) Pori, Finland
- Height: 190 cm (6 ft 3 in)
- Weight: 101 kg (223 lb; 15 st 13 lb)
- Position: Winger
- Shot: Left
- Played for: HC Ässät Pori; Newcastle Vipers; EfB Ishockey
- Playing career: 2001–2013

Patrik Forsbacka (born 12 August 1982) is a Finnish former professional ice hockey winger. Forsbacka represented the HC Ässät Pori of the Finnish Elite League for most of his career – 6 seasons and 160 games.

Forsbacka was known for his physical playstyle and he had an enforcer role in his teams. In 160 Finnish Elite League regular season games Forsbacka recorded 371 penalty minutes and an additional 18 minutes in 13 playoff matches. In total he recorded 995 penalty minutes in his entire career in men's leagues.

== Career ==
Forsbacka started his career in the junior ranks of HC Ässät Pori. He appeared in four SM-liiga games during the 2001–02 season before spending three seasons between Ässät's U20 team and lower division teams in Finland.

In the spring of 2005, Ässät unexpectedly offered Forsbacka, who worked at a construction site, a try-out contract for the summer. The trial period resulted in a contract with Ässät for the 2005–2006 season. The season went well for both Forsbacka and the club. Forsbacka played in the fourth line with Matti Kuparinen and Juha Kiilholma, which was known for physical play and fighting. Ässät made it to the SM-liiga finals and Forsbacka signed a two-year contract extension with the team. The 2006–07 season started unluckily for Forsbacka as he injured his shoulder in the first game of the season. The shoulder had to be operated on. He was able to return to the ice in January. The following season went rather poorly for the whole team. At the beginning of the 2008–09 season, Forsbacka was seriously injured again, the anterior cruciate ligament of the knee was broken four games into the season. In the 2009–10 season, Forsbacka's cycle of injuries continued, this time his spleen ruptured in the eighth game of the season and he finished the season with just 32 games played. During his time with Ässät, Forsbacka earned the nickname The White Indian.

For the 2010–11 season Forsbacka joined the Newcastle Vipers of the EIHL, but he moved to the Danish side EfB Ishockey in the middle of the season. Forsbacka's last two seasons were spent at KooKoo of the Mestis and Olofströms IK in the HockeyEttan. Forsbacka retired at the conclusion of the 2012–13 season.

After retirement from ice hockey, Forsbacka has worked in construction.
