= Evgeni Bolyakin =

Kazakhstani ice hockey player

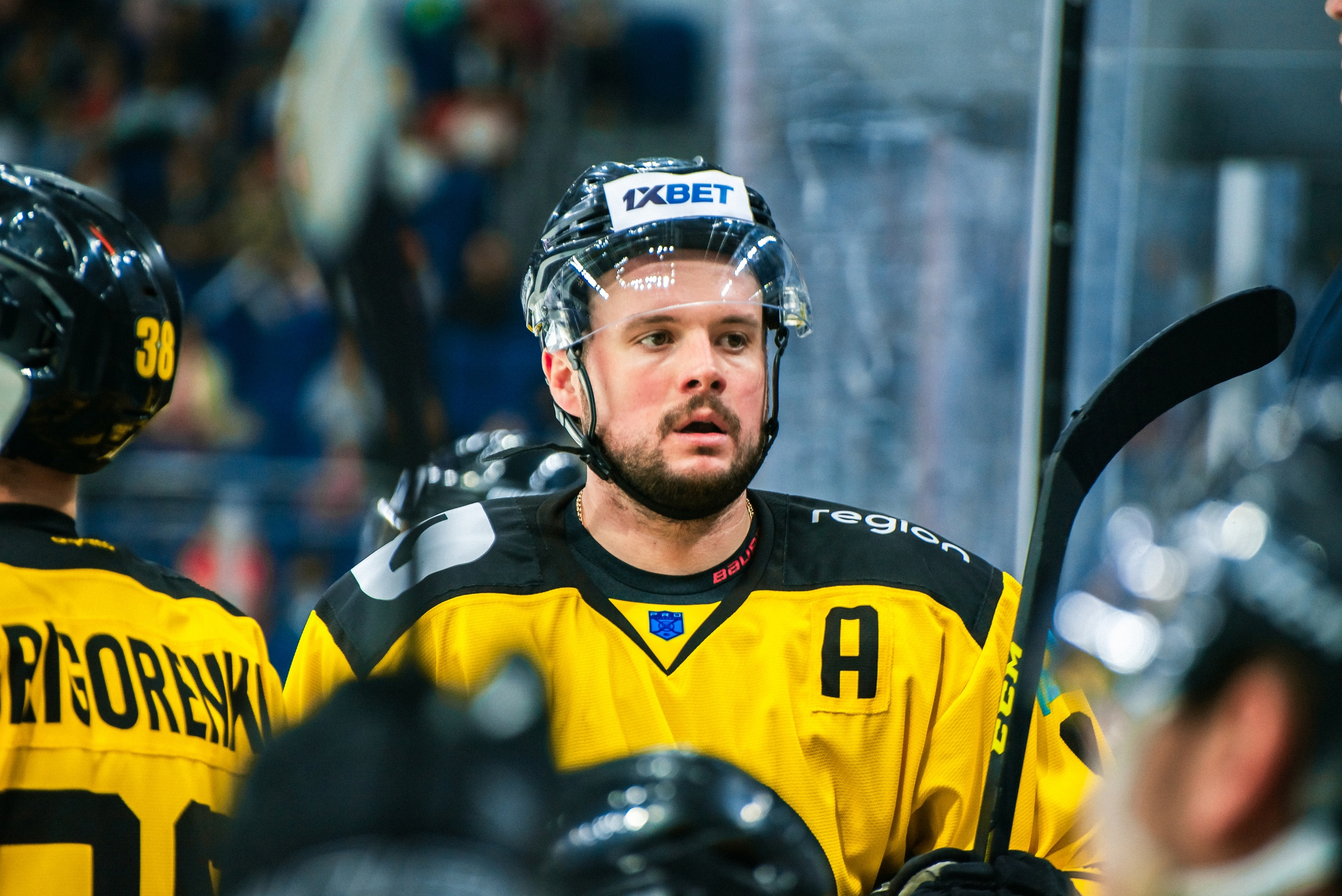
- Born: 20 April 1990 (age 34); Karaganda, Kazakh SSR, Soviet Union
- Height: 5 ft 11 in (180 cm)
- Weight: 198 lb (90 kg; 14 st 2 lb)
- Position: Defence
- Shoots: Right
- VHL team Former teams: Yermak Angarsk; Amur Khabarovsk; HC Spartak Moscow
- NHL draft: Undrafted
- Playing career: 2008–present

Evgeni Olegovich Bolyakin (Russian: Евгений Олегович Болякин; born 20 April 1990) is a Kazakhstani professional ice hockey player who is currently playing with Yermak Angarsk in the Supreme Hockey League (VHL).

Bolyakin played in the Kontinental Hockey League with Amur Khabarovsk during the 2008-09 KHL season and with HC Spartak Moscow during the 2009–10 KHL season.
