= Jan Semorád =

Czech ice hockey player

- Born: March 19, 1988 (age 37)
- Height: 6 ft 0 in (183 cm)
- Weight: 181 lb (82 kg; 12 st 13 lb)
- Position: Forward
- Shoots: Right
- Czech Extraliga team: HC Pardubice
- Playing career: 2007–present

Jan Semorád (born March 19, 1988) is a Czech professional ice hockey player. He played with HC Pardubice in the Czech Extraliga during the 2010–11 Czech Extraliga season.
