= 2008 World Junior Ice Hockey Championships – Division II =

2008 IIHF U20 World Championship Division II
Tournament details
- Host countries: Italy; Estonia
- Venue(s): 2 (in 2 host cities)
- Dates: 9–15 December 2007; 10–16 December 2007
- Teams: 12

The 2008 World Junior Ice Hockey Championship Division II was a pair of international ice hockey tournaments organized by the International Ice Hockey Federation. Division II represents the third level of the 2008 World Junior Ice Hockey Championships.

== Group A ==
The Group A tournament was played in Canazei, Italy, from 9 to 15 December 2007.

=== Participating teams ===
| Team | Qualification |
|---|---|
| Italy | Hosts; placed 6th in Division I (Group B) last year and were relegated. |
| Romania | Placed 2nd in Division II (Group A) last year. |
| Japan | Placed 3rd in Division II (Group B) last year. |
| South Korea | Placed 4th in Division II (Group B) last year. |
| Iceland | Placed 5th in Division II (Group A) last year. |
| Belgium | Placed 2nd in Division III last year and were promoted. |

=== Final standings ===
| Pos | Team | Pld | W | OTW | OTL | L | GF | GA | GD | Pts | Promotion or relegation |
|---|---|---|---|---|---|---|---|---|---|---|---|
| 1 | Italy (H) | 5 | 5 | 0 | 0 | 0 | 37 | 8 | +29 | 15 | Promoted to the 2009 Division I |
| 2 | Japan | 5 | 4 | 0 | 0 | 1 | 37 | 7 | +30 | 12 | |
| 3 | South Korea | 5 | 3 | 0 | 0 | 2 | 18 | 11 | +7 | 9 | |
| 4 | Belgium | 5 | 1 | 1 | 0 | 3 | 12 | 21 | −9 | 5 | |
| 5 | Romania | 5 | 1 | 0 | 1 | 3 | 13 | 30 | −17 | 4 | |
| 6 | Iceland | 5 | 0 | 0 | 0 | 5 | 7 | 47 | −40 | 0 | Relegated to the 2009 Division III |

Source: IIHF
(H) Host

=== Match results ===
All times are local (Central European Time – UTC+1).

| 9 December 2007; 13:00 | Romania | 6–4 (0–1, 3–1, 3–2) | Iceland | Alba di Canazei |

Game reference

| 9 December 2007; 16:30 | Belgium | 0–3 (0–0, 0–0, 0–3) | South Korea | Alba di Canazei |

Game reference

| 9 December 2007; 20:00 | Japan | 1–5 (0–2, 1–2, 0–1) | Italy | Alba di Canazei |

Game reference

| 10 December 2007; 13:00 | Iceland | 1–5 (1–2, 0–1, 0–2) | Belgium | Alba di Canazei |

Game reference

| 10 December 2007; 16:30 | Romania | 0–6 (0–3, 0–0, 0–3) | Japan | Alba di Canazei |

Game reference

| 10 December 2007; 20:00 | Italy | 4–3 (1–0, 2–1, 1–2) | South Korea | Alba di Canazei |

Game reference

| 12 December 2007; 13:00 | Romania | 4–5 GWS (1–1, 3–3, 0–0); OT: 0–0, GWS: 0–1 | Belgium | Alba di Canazei |

Game reference

| 12 December 2007; 16:30 | Japan | 5–1 (0–0, 2–1, 3–0) | South Korea | Alba di Canazei |

Game reference

| 12 December 2007; 20:00 | Italy | 11–1 (2–0, 2–0, 7–1) | Iceland | Alba di Canazei |

Game reference

| 13 December 2007; 13:00 | Iceland | 1–17 (0–5, 0–3, 1–9) | Japan | Alba di Canazei |

Game reference

| 13 December 2007; 16:30 | South Korea | 3–2 (1–1, 1–1, 1–0) | Romania | Alba di Canazei |

Game reference

| 13 December 2007; 20:00 | Belgium | 2–5 (0–2, 1–2, 1–1) | Italy | Alba di Canazei |

Game reference

| 15 December 2007; 13:00 | Japan | 8–0 (1–0, 5–0, 2–0) | Belgium | Alba di Canazei |

Game reference

| 15 December 2007; 16:30 | South Korea | 8–0 (3–0, 2–0, 3–0) | Iceland | Alba di Canazei |

Game reference

| 15 December 2007; 20:00 | Italy | 12–1 (0–0, 4–0, 8–1) | Romania | Alba di Canazei |

Game reference

== Group B ==
The Group B tournament was played in Tallinn, Estonia, from 10 to 16 December 2007.

=== Participating teams ===
| Team | Qualification |
|---|---|
| Estonia | Hosts; placed 6th in Division I (Group A) last year and were relegated. |
| Netherlands | Placed 2nd in Division II (Group B) last year. |
| Croatia | Placed 3rd in Division II (Group A) last year. |
| Spain | Placed 4th in Division II (Group A) last year. |
| Mexico | Placed 5th in Division II (Group B) last year. |
| China | Placed 1st in Division III last year and were promoted. |

=== Final standings ===
| Pos | Team | Pld | W | OTW | OTL | L | GF | GA | GD | Pts | Promotion or relegation |
|---|---|---|---|---|---|---|---|---|---|---|---|
| 1 | Estonia (H) | 5 | 4 | 1 | 0 | 0 | 35 | 8 | +27 | 14 | Promoted to the 2009 Division I |
| 2 | Netherlands | 5 | 4 | 0 | 1 | 0 | 36 | 5 | +31 | 13 | |
| 3 | Croatia | 5 | 3 | 0 | 0 | 2 | 24 | 19 | +5 | 9 | |
| 4 | Spain | 5 | 2 | 0 | 0 | 3 | 24 | 27 | −3 | 6 | |
| 5 | Mexico | 5 | 1 | 0 | 0 | 4 | 8 | 27 | −19 | 3 | |
| 6 | China | 5 | 0 | 0 | 0 | 5 | 8 | 49 | −41 | 0 | Relegated to the 2009 Division III |

Source: IIHF
(H) Host

=== Match results ===
All times are local (Eastern European Time – UTC+2).

| 10 December 2007; 13:00 | China | 3–9 (0–2, 2–4, 1–3) | Spain | Arena Premia, Tallinn |

Game reference

| 10 December 2007; 16:30 | Netherlands | 7–0 (3–0, 4–0, 0–0) | Mexico | Arena Premia, Tallinn |

Game reference

| 10 December 2007; 20:00 | Croatia | 2–5 (1–1, 1–2, 0–2) | Estonia | Arena Premia, Tallinn |

Game reference

| 11 December 2007; 13:00 | Mexico | 4–1 (0–0, 3–0, 1–1) | China | Arena Premia, Tallinn |

Game reference

| 11 December 2007; 16:30 | Netherlands | 8–0 (3–0, 3–0, 2–0) | Croatia | Arena Premia, Tallinn |

Game reference

| 11 December 2007; 20:00 | Estonia | 13–2 (4–0, 5–0, 4–2) | Spain | Arena Premia, Tallinn |

Game reference

| 13 December 2007; 13:00 | Netherlands | 14–1 (6–0, 6–1, 2–0) | China | Arena Premia, Tallinn |

Game reference

| 13 December 2007; 16:30 | Croatia | 5–2 (1–0, 4–1, 0–1) | Spain | Arena Premia, Tallinn |

Game reference

| 13 December 2007; 20:00 | Estonia | 4–1 (1–0, 2–0, 1–1) | Mexico | Arena Premia, Tallinn |

Game reference

| 14 December 2007; 13:00 | Mexico | 2–5 (0–1, 0–1, 2–3) | Croatia | Arena Premia, Tallinn |

Game reference

| 14 December 2007; 16:30 | Spain | 1–5 (1–2, 0–1, 0–2) | Netherlands | Arena Premia, Tallinn |

Game reference

| 14 December 2007; 20:00 | China | 1–10 (0–2, 0–4, 1–4) | Estonia | Arena Premia, Tallinn |

Game reference

| 16 December 2007; 12:30 | Spain | 10–1 (4–0, 3–1, 3–0) | Mexico | Arena Premia, Tallinn |

Game reference

| 16 December 2007; 16:00 | Croatia | 12–2 (1–0, 4–1, 7–1) | China | Arena Premia, Tallinn |

Game reference

| 16 December 2007; 19:30 | Estonia | 3–2 GWS (1–0, 1–1, 0–1); OT: 0–0, GWS: 1–0 | Netherlands | Arena Premia, Tallinn |

Game reference

== See also ==
- 2008 World Junior Ice Hockey Championships
- 2008 World Junior Ice Hockey Championships – Division I
- 2008 World Junior Ice Hockey Championships – Division II
- 2008 World Junior Ice Hockey Championships – Division III
- 2008 World Junior Ice Hockey Championships rosters
