= Jakub Suja =

Slovak ice hockey player (born 1988)

- Born: November 1, 1988 (age 37) Prešov, Czechoslovakia
- Height: 6 ft 0 in (183 cm)
- Weight: 196 lb (89 kg; 14 st 0 lb)
- Position: Centre
- Shoots: Left
- Tipos SHL team Former teams: HC 21 Prešov; HC Košice; HC Prešov; HK Orange 20; HK Spišská Nová Ves; Motor České Budějovice; Mountfield HK; HC Stadion Litoměřice; MHC Martin; Bratislava Capitals
- National team: Slovakia
- Playing career: 2007–present

Jakub Suja (born November 1, 1988) is a Slovak professional ice hockey player who is currently playing for HK Dukla Michalovce of the Slovak Extraliga.

== Career ==
He had most recently played for HC Košice of the Slovak Extraliga.

== Career statistics ==
=== International ===
Year	Team	Event	Result	GP	G	A	Pts	PIM
2008	Slovakia	WJC	7th	6	0	1	1	0
2017	Slovakia	WC	14th	4	0	0	0	0
Junior totals				6	0	1	1	0
Senior totals				4	0	0	0	0
