= Eduard Mazula =

Kazakhstani ice hockey player

- Born: March 21, 1990 (age 34); Karaganda, KAZ
- Height: 5 ft 11 in (180 cm)
- Weight: 165 lb (75 kg; 11 st 11 lb)
- Position: Forward
- Shoots: Right
- KVL team Former teams: HC Arystan; HC Saryarka; HC Kazakhmys
- Playing career: 2008–present

Edward Mazula (born March 21, 1990) is a professional ice hockey forward currently playing for the HC Arystan. He was a member of the Kazakhstan men's national junior ice hockey team at the 2009 World Junior Ice Hockey Championships as well as at the 2010 World Junior Ice Hockey Championships.
