= Gaetan Augsburger =

Swiss ice hockey player

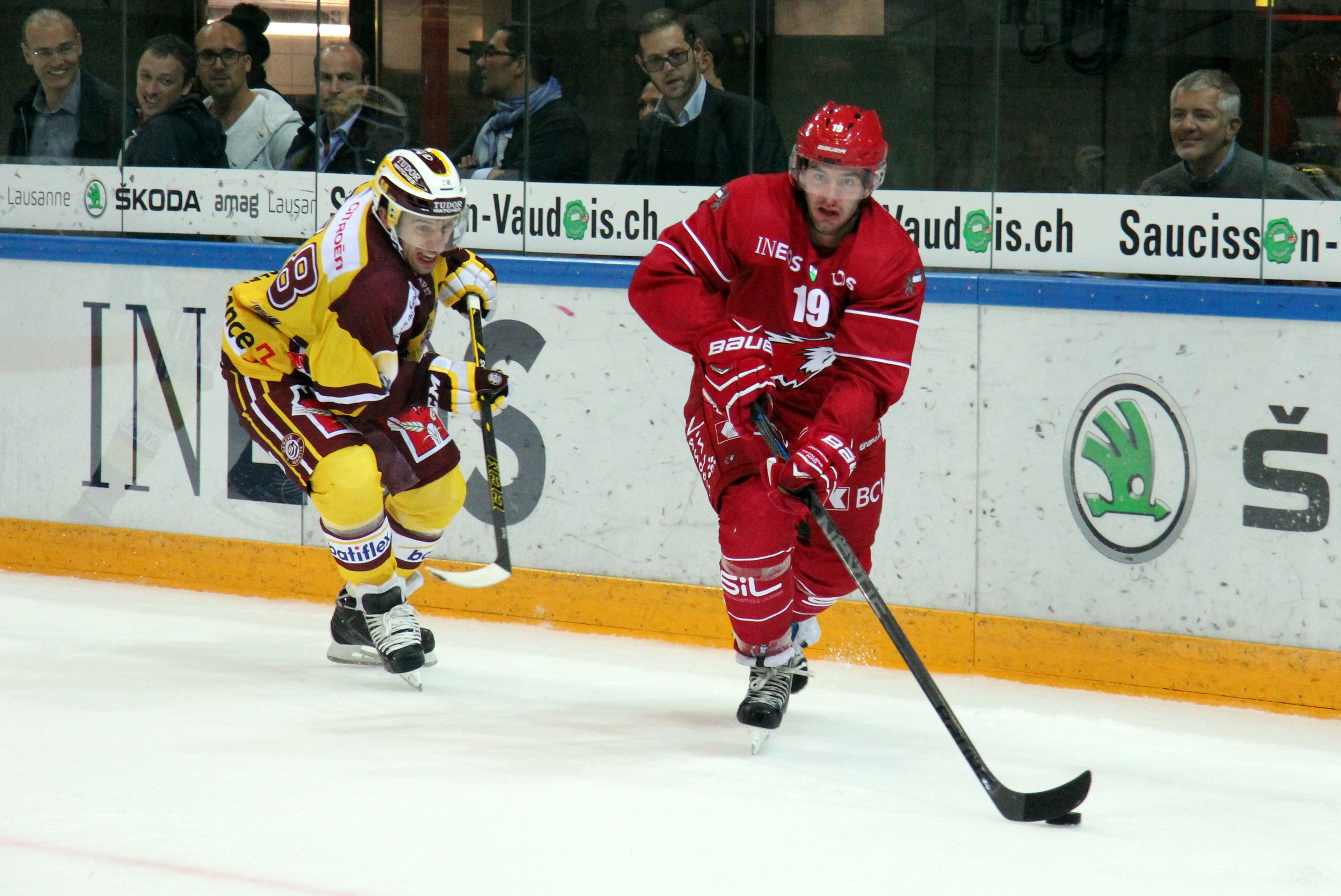
- Born: 4 April 1988 (age 36); Saint-Imier, Switzerland
- Height: 5 ft 10 in (178 cm)
- Weight: 190 lb (86 kg; 13 st 8 lb)
- Position: Winger
- Shoots: Left
- NLA team Former teams: Lausanne HC; Genève-Servette HC
- NHL draft: Undrafted
- Playing career: 2005–present

Gaetan Augsburger (born 4 April 1988) is a Swiss ice hockey player. He is currently playing with Lausanne HC of the Swiss National League A.

Augsburger made his National League A debut playing with Genève-Servette HC during the 2005–06 NLA season.
