= 2008 World Junior Ice Hockey Championships – Division I =

2008 IIHF U20 World Championship Division I
Tournament details
- Host countries: Germany; Latvia
- Venue(s): 2 (in 2 host cities)
- Dates: 9–15 December 2007; 12–18 December 2007
- Teams: 12

The 2008 World Junior Ice Hockey Championship Division I was a pair of international ice hockey tournaments organized by the International Ice Hockey Federation. Division I represents the second level of the 2008 World Junior Ice Hockey Championships.

== Group A ==
The Group A tournament was played in Bad Tölz, Germany, from 9 to 15 December 2007.

=== Participating teams ===
Team	Qualification
Germany	Hosts; placed 9th in Top Division last year and were relegated.
Austria	Placed 2nd in Division I (Group B) last year.
Ukraine	Placed 3rd in Division I (Group A) last year.
Poland	Placed 4th in Division I (Group A) last year.
Norway	Placed 5th in Division I (Group B) last year.
Lithuania	Placed 1st in Division II (Group B) last year and were promoted.

=== Final standings ===
Pos	Team	Pld	W	OTW	OTL	L	GF	GA	GD	Pts	Promotion or relegation
1	Germany (H)	5	5	0	0	0	42	6	+36	15	Promoted to the 2009 Top Division
2	Austria	5	4	0	0	1	36	11	+25	12	
3	Norway	5	3	0	0	2	19	16	+3	9	
4	Poland	5	1	0	1	3	7	24	−17	4	
5	Ukraine	5	0	1	1	3	10	26	−16	3	
6	Lithuania	5	0	1	0	4	8	39	−31	2	Relegated to the 2009 Division II

Source: IIHF
(H) Host

=== Match results ===
All times are local (Central European Time – UTC+1).

9 December 2007; 13:00	Norway	3–0 (1–0, 1–0, 1–0)	Ukraine	Hacker-Pschorr Arena, Bad Tölz

Game reference

9 December 2007; 16:30	Lithuania	1–7 (1–3, 0–0, 0–4)	Germany	Hacker-Pschorr Arena, Bad Tölz

Game reference

9 December 2007; 20:00	Poland	1–6 (0–2, 0–1, 1–3)	Austria	Hacker-Pschorr Arena, Bad Tölz

Game reference

10 December 2007; 13:00	Ukraine	3–4 GWS (2–2, 1–1, 0–0); OT: 0–0, GWS: 0–1	Lithuania	Hacker-Pschorr Arena, Bad Tölz

Game reference

10 December 2007; 16:30	Austria	5–0 (1–0, 4–0, 0–0)	Norway	Hacker-Pschorr Arena, Bad Tölz

Game reference

10 December 2007; 20:00	Germany	11–0 (5–0, 3–0, 3–0)	Poland	Hacker-Pschorr Arena, Bad Tölz

Game reference

12 December 2007; 13:00	Lithuania	1–3 (0–0, 1–3, 0–0)	Poland	Hacker-Pschorr Arena, Bad Tölz

Game reference

12 December 2007; 16:30	Austria	7–4 (1–1, 0–3, 6–0)	Ukraine	Hacker-Pschorr Arena, Bad Tölz

Game reference

12 December 2007; 20:00	Germany	7–1 (1–0, 3–0, 3–1)	Norway	Hacker-Pschorr Arena, Bad Tölz

Game reference

13 December 2007; 13:00	Austria	15–0 (3–0, 8–0, 4–0)	Lithuania	Hacker-Pschorr Arena, Bad Tölz

Game reference

13 December 2007; 16:30	Poland	2–4 (1–2, 1–1, 0–1)	Norway	Hacker-Pschorr Arena, Bad Tölz

Game reference

13 December 2007; 20:00	Ukraine	1–11 (1–0, 0–3, 0–8)	Germany	Hacker-Pschorr Arena, Bad Tölz

Game reference

15 December 2007; 12:30	Norway	11–2 (4–0, 3–2, 4–0)	Lithuania	Hacker-Pschorr Arena, Bad Tölz

Game reference

15 December 2007; 16:00	Ukraine	2–1 GWS (1–0, 0–1, 0–0); OT: 0–0, GWS: 1–0	Poland	Hacker-Pschorr Arena, Bad Tölz

Game reference

15 December 2007; 19:30	Germany	6–3 (2–0, 1–0, 3–3)	Austria	Hacker-Pschorr Arena, Bad Tölz

Game reference

== Group B ==
The Group B tournament was played in Riga, Latvia, from 12 to 18 December 2007.

=== Participating teams ===
Team	Qualification
Belarus	placed 10th in Top Division last year and were relegated.
Latvia	Hosts; placed 2nd in Division I (Group A) last year.
Great Britain	Placed 3rd in Division I (Group B) last year.
France	Placed 4th in Division I (Group B) last year.
Slovenia	Placed 5th in Division I (Group A) last year.
Hungary	Placed 1st in Division II (Group A) last year and were promoted.

=== Final standings ===
Pos	Team	Pld	W	OTW	OTL	L	GF	GA	GD	Pts	Promotion or relegation
1	Latvia (H)	5	4	0	0	1	28	9	+19	12	Promoted to the 2009 Top Division
2	Belarus	5	4	0	0	1	21	8	+13	12	
3	Slovenia	5	3	1	0	1	17	8	+9	11	
4	Hungary	5	2	0	0	3	17	21	−4	6	
5	France	5	1	0	0	4	14	29	−15	3	
6	Great Britain	5	0	0	1	4	8	30	−22	1	Relegated to the 2009 Division II

Source: IIHF
(H) Host

=== Match results ===
All times are local (Eastern European Time – UTC+2).

12 December 2007; 13:00	Slovenia	4–3 GWS (1–0, 1–3, 1–0); OT: 0–0, GWS: 1–0	Great Britain	Arena Riga, Riga

Game reference

12 December 2007; 16:30	Hungary	2–3 (1–2, 0–0, 1–1)	Belarus	Arena Riga, Riga

Game reference

12 December 2007; 20:00	France	3–9 (2–1, 0–5, 1–3)	Latvia	Arena Riga, Riga

Game reference

13 December 2007; 13:00	Great Britain	2–5 (1–0, 1–3, 0–2)	Hungary	Arena Riga, Riga

Game reference

13 December 2007; 16:30	Belarus	6–1 (1–0, 3–1, 2–0)	France	Arena Riga, Riga

Game reference

13 December 2007; 20:00	Latvia	2–3 (0–0, 2–2, 0–1)	Slovenia	Arena Riga, Riga

Game reference

15 December 2007; 13:00	Hungary	7–4 (0–1, 2–0, 5–3)	France	Arena Riga, Riga

Game reference

15 December 2007; 16:30	Belarus	2–1 (0–0, 1–0, 1–1)	Slovenia	Arena Riga, Riga

Game reference

15 December 2007; 20:00	Latvia	6–0 (2–0, 3–0, 1–0)	Great Britain	Arena Riga, Riga

Game reference

16 December 2007; 13:00	France	0–5 (0–2, 0–3, 0–0)	Slovenia	Arena Riga, Riga

Game reference

16 December 2007; 16:30	Great Britain	1–9 (0–0, 0–8, 1–1)	Belarus	Arena Riga, Riga

Game reference

16 December 2007; 20:00	Latvia	8–2 (2–1, 2–0, 4–1)	Hungary	Arena Riga, Riga

Game reference

18 December 2007; 12:30	Slovenia	4–1 (0–1, 3–0, 1–0)	Hungary	Arena Riga, Riga

Game reference

18 December 2007; 16:00	Great Britain	2–6 (1–3, 1–1, 0–2)	France	Arena Riga, Riga

Game reference

18 December 2007; 19:30	Belarus	1–3 (0–0, 1–1, 0–2)	Latvia	Arena Riga, Riga

Game reference

== See also ==
- 2008 World Junior Ice Hockey Championships
- 2008 World Junior Ice Hockey Championships – Division I
- 2008 World Junior Ice Hockey Championships – Division II
- 2008 World Junior Ice Hockey Championships – Division III
- 2008 World Junior Ice Hockey Championships rosters
