= Marek Biro =

Slovak ice hockey defenceman

- Born: 8 February 1988 (age 37); Banská Bystrica, Czechoslovakia
- Height: 6 ft 4 in (193 cm)
- Weight: 209 lb (95 kg; 14 st 13 lb)
- Position: Defence
- Shoots: Left
- Polska Hokej Liga team Former teams: GKS Tychy; HC Košice; HK Dukla Trenčín; ŠHK 37 Piešťany; Orli Znojmo; HC '05 Banská Bystrica
- Playing career: 2008–present

Marek Biro (born 8 February 1988) is a Slovak professional ice hockey defenceman currently playing for GKS Tychy of the Polska Hokej Liga.

== Career ==
Biro played junior hockey in the Ontario Hockey League for two seasons for the Windsor Spitfires, who drafted him 18th overall in the 2006 CHL Import Draft. In 2008, he made his Tipsport Liga debut with his hometown team HC Banská Bystrica where he played for three seasons until 2011

Biro then had spells with HC Košice and HK Dukla Trenčín before rejoining Banská Bystrica. He then spent the 2013–14 season with ŠHK 37 Piešťany before returning to Banská Bystrica once more the following season.

On 17 May 2015 Biro joined Orli Znojmo of the Erste Bank Eishockey Liga. He then made another return to Banská Bystrica on 22 May 2018.
