= Parkkonen =

Parkkonen is a Finnish surname. Notable people with the surname include:

- Patrik Parkkonen (born 1993), Finnish ice hockey player
- Pete Parkkonen (drummer), Finnish drummer of band Zen Café
- Pete Parkkonen (singer), Finnish singer and contestant in Finnish Idols
