= Juha Kiilholma =

Finnish ice hockey player

- Born: 26 June 1982 (age 43) Pori, Finland
- Height: 6 ft 0 in (183 cm)
- Weight: 183 lb (83 kg; 13 st 1 lb)
- Position: Right wing
- Shoots: Left
- Mestis team Former teams: SaPKo; Tappara; Oulun Kärpät; SaiPa; HPK; Pori Ässät
- NHL draft: Undrafted
- Playing career: 2001–present

Juha Kiilholma (born 26 June 1982) is a Finnish professional ice hockey player. He is currently playing SaPKo of the Finnish Mestis.

Kiilholma made his SM-liiga debut playing with Pori Ässät during the 2001–02 SM-liiga season.

== Career statistics ==
			Regular season					Playoffs
Season	Team	League	GP	G	A	Pts	PIM	GP	G	A	Pts	PIM
1997–98	Porin Ässät U16	U16 SM-sarja Q	10	4	7	11	6	—	—	—	—	—
1998–99	Porin Ässät U18	U18 SM-sarja	14	6	4	10	22	—	—	—	—	—
1998–99	Porin Ässät U20	U20 SM-liiga	4	0	0	0	4	—	—	—	—	—
1999–00	Porin Ässät U18	U18 I-Divisioona	—	—	—	—	—	—	—	—	—	—
1999–00	Porin Ässät U20	U20 SM-liiga	11	0	2	2	8	—	—	—	—	—
2000–01	Minot Muskies	AWHL	53	28	41	69	77	—	—	—	—	—
2001–02	Lukko U20	U20 SM-liiga	21	10	12	22	28	—	—	—	—	—
2001–02	Porin Ässät U20	U20 I-Divisioona	12	8	14	22	16	5	1	6	7	6
2001–02	Porin Ässät	SM-liiga	13	2	0	2	6	—	—	—	—	—
2002–03	Porin Ässät U20	U20 SM-liiga	7	8	4	12	8	—	—	—	—	—
2002–03	Porin Ässät	SM-liiga	53	4	2	6	36	—	—	—	—	—
2003–04	Porin Ässät	SM-liiga	56	6	10	16	24	—	—	—	—	—
2004–05	Porin Ässät	SM-liiga	56	4	5	9	48	2	0	0	0	2
2005–06	Porin Ässät	SM-liiga	55	3	11	14	54	12	2	5	7	18
2006–07	Tappara	SM-liiga	42	1	7	8	42	5	1	0	1	8
2006–07	IFK Arboga	HockeyAllsvenskan	10	3	6	9	10	—	—	—	—	—
2007–08	Tappara	SM-liiga	55	5	14	19	68	11	1	7	8	10
2008–09	Herning Blue Fox	Denmark	44	11	24	35	36	16	1	7	8	18
2009–10	Hokki	Mestis	5	1	9	10	2	—	—	—	—	—
2009–10	Oulun Kärpät	SM-liiga	51	3	10	13	36	10	1	1	2	36
2010–11	VIK Västerås HK	HockeyAllsvenskan	13	0	5	5	14	—	—	—	—	—
2010–11	SaiPa	SM-liiga	37	4	7	11	73	—	—	—	—	—
2011–12	SaiPa	SM-liiga	58	8	10	18	30	—	—	—	—	—
2012–13	HPK	SM-liiga	57	10	8	18	89	5	0	0	0	10
2013–14	HPK	Liiga	60	11	20	31	38	6	0	3	3	4
2014–15	Porin Ässät	Liiga	60	11	17	28	44	2	0	0	0	0
2015–16	Porin Ässät	Liiga	59	11	23	34	59	—	—	—	—	—
2016–17	Porin Ässät	Liiga	42	2	3	5	20	1	0	0	0	0
2017–18	SaPKo	Mestis	4	2	2	4	0	—	—	—	—	—
2017–18	Herning Blue Fox	Denmark	11	3	7	10	2	8	0	3	3	8
2018–19	TH Unia Oświęcim	Poland	31	8	22	30	20	10	1	1	2	14
2019–20	Heerenveen Flyers	BeNeLiga	20	13	36	49	12	2	1	1	2	25
Liiga totals			754	85	147	232	667	54	5	16	21	88

Sporting positions
Preceded by Ville Uusitalo	Porin Ässät captain 2015–16	Succeeded by Matti Kuparinen
