= Aki Juusela =

Finnish ice hockey left winger

- Born: June 28, 1991 (age 34) Rauma, Finland
- Height: 6 ft 2 in (188 cm)
- Weight: 207 lb (94 kg; 14 st 11 lb)
- Position: Left wing
- Shoots: Left
- 4. div team; Former teams: Rauma Tigers; Ässät; HK Dukla Michalovce; Ferencvárosi TC
- Playing career: 2011–present

Aki Juusela (born June 28, 1991) is a Finnish professional ice hockey left winger.

Juusela previously played in Liiga for Ässät and made his debut for the team during the 2011–12 season. After two seasons, he moved to Lempäälän Kisa of Mestis on August 1, 2013. After a failed try-out with Västerviks IK, Juusela was further down a division, signing for HC Satakunta of the Suomi-sarja before returning to Mestis with KooKoo.

On August 17, 2015, Juusela signed for TUTO Hockey. He stayed for three seasons before returning to Ässät on April 30, 2018. On May 30, 2019, Juusela moved to Slovakia to sign for HK Dukla Michalovce of the Tipsport Liga.
