= Patrik Marcel =

Czech ice hockey player

- Born: November 27, 1994 (age 31) Czech Republic
- Height: 5 ft 9 in (175 cm)
- Weight: 207 lb (94 kg; 14 st 11 lb)
- Position: Defenseman
- Shoots: Left
- Czech team Former teams: HC Litoměřice; HC Plzeň
- Playing career: 2013–present

Patrik Marcel (born November 27, 1994) is a Czech professional ice hockey player. He is currently playing for HC Vítkovice RIDERA of the CHANCE Liga.

Marcel made his Czech Extraliga debut playing with HC Plzeň during the 2013–14 Czech Extraliga season.
