= Santtu Huhtala =

Finnish ice hockey player

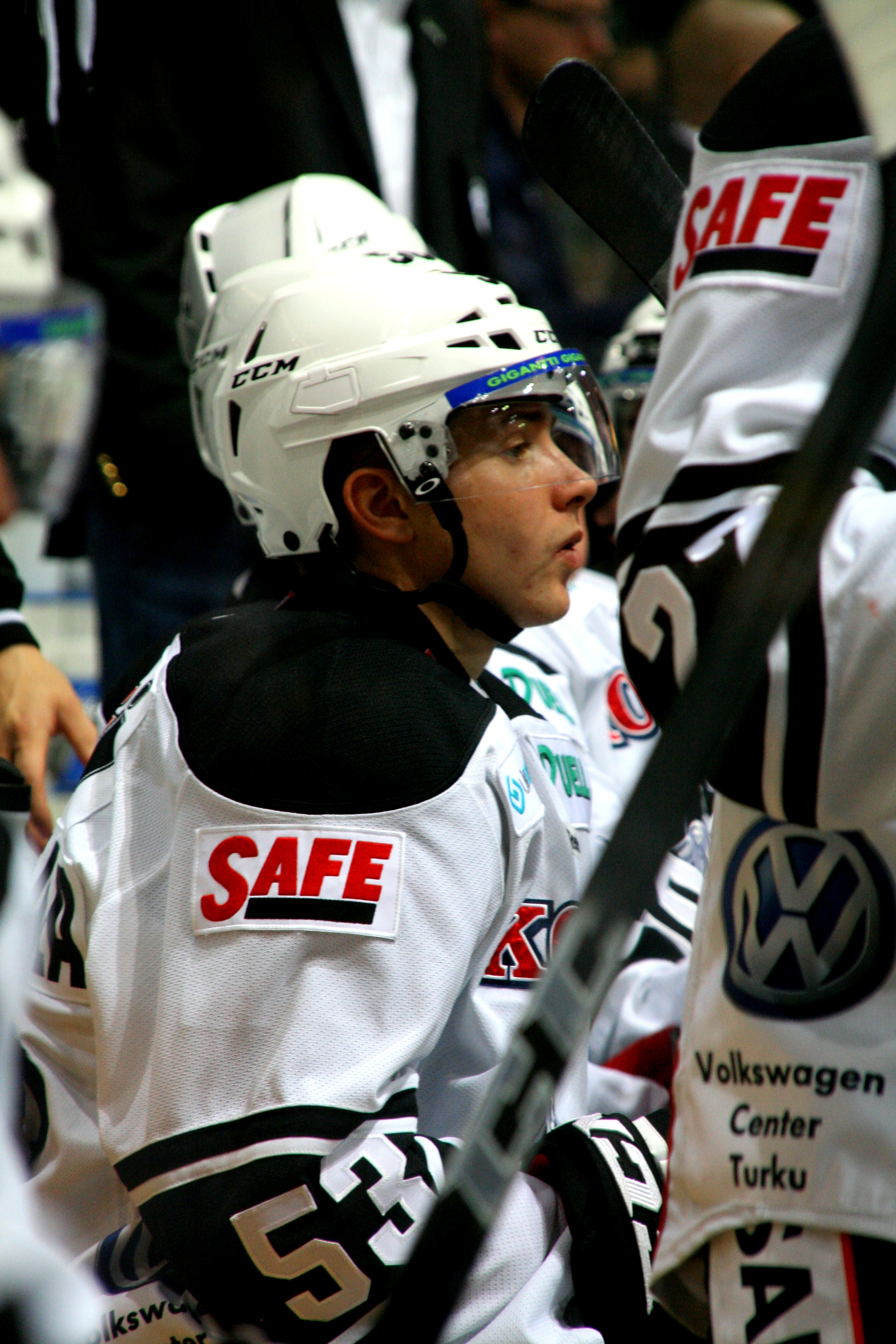
- Ice Hockey Team TPS' Attacker #53 Santtu Huhtala
- Born: March 15, 1992 (age 33); Salo, Finland
- Height: 5 ft 9 in (175 cm)
- Weight: 165 lb (75 kg; 11 st 11 lb)
- Position: Forward
- Shoots: Left
- SM-liiga team: HC TPS
- Playing career: 2011–present

Santtu Huhtala (born March 15, 1992) is a Finnish ice hockey player. His is currently playing with HC TPS in the Finnish SM-liiga.

Huhtala made his SM-liiga debut playing with HC TPS during the 2011–12 SM-liiga season.
