= Rasmus Rinne =

Finnish ice hockey player

- Born: 8 July 1990 (age 35) Hyvinkää, Finland
- Height: 6 ft 5 in (196 cm)
- Weight: 209 lb (95 kg; 14 st 13 lb)
- Position: Goaltender
- Catches: Left
- team Former teams: Gyergyói HK; Ässät; Lukko; Vaasan Sport; Dornbirn Bulldogs
- National team: Romania
- Playing career: 2009–present

Rasmus Rinne (born 8 July 1990) is a Finnish professional ice hockey goaltender currently playing for Gyergyói HK. He previously played for the Dornbirn Bulldogs in the Austrian Hockey League (ICEHL). Rinne plays for Romania .n international tournaments and holds Romanian citizenship

Rinne made his Liiga debut playing with Ässät during the 2013–14 Liiga season. He played the 2016–17 season for Sport.
