= Ville Ahlgren =

Finnish ice hockey player

- Born: October 6, 1993 (age 32) Pori, Finland
- Height: 5 ft 9 in (175 cm)
- Weight: 172 lb (78 kg; 12 st 4 lb)
- Position: Forward
- Shot: Left
- Played for: Porin Ässät; Chamonix-Morzine; Kokkolan Hermes
- NHL draft: Undrafted
- Playing career: 2013–2018

Ville Ahlgren (born October 6, 1993) is a Finnish former professional ice hockey player.

== Career ==
After playing two seasons with the Espoo Blues junior-A team, Ahlgren returned to his youth club, the Porin Ässät. Ahlgren made his professional Liiga debut playing with Ässät during the 2013–14 Liiga season. He played two more seasons with Ässät before joining the Ligue Magnus club Pionniers de Chamonix-Morzine for the 2016–17 season.

After one year with Chamonix-Morzine, Ahlgren returned to Finland to play in the 2nd tier club Kokkolan Hermes before retiring in 2018 at the age of 25.

== Career statistics ==
| | | | Regular season | | | | | Playoffs |
| Season | Team | League | GP | G | A | Pts | PIM | GP | G | A | Pts | PIM |
|---|---|---|---|---|---|---|---|---|---|---|---|---|
| 2008–09 | Porin Ässät U16 | U16 SM-sarja Q | 7 | 7 | 12 | 19 | 12 | — | — | — | — | — |
| 2008–09 | Porin Ässät U16 | U16 SM-sarja | 25 | 14 | 12 | 26 | 40 | 3 | 1 | 1 | 2 | 6 |
| 2008–09 | Porin Ässät U18 | U18 SM-sarja | 2 | 0 | 2 | 2 | 0 | — | — | — | — | — |
| 2009–10 | Dallas Stars 18U AAA | T1EHL 18U | 47 | 9 | 18 | 27 | 6 | — | — | — | — | — |
| 2010–11 | Porin Ässät U18 | U18 SM-sarja Q | 3 | 3 | 2 | 5 | 2 | — | — | — | — | — |
| 2010–11 | Porin Ässät U18 | U18 SM-sarja | 6 | 2 | 4 | 6 | 22 | — | — | — | — | — |
| 2010–11 | Porin Ässät U20 | U20 SM-liiga | 28 | 10 | 11 | 21 | 49 | 3 | 0 | 1 | 1 | 0 |
| 2011–12 | Espoo Blues U20 | U20 SM-liiga | 39 | 16 | 25 | 41 | 10 | 4 | 1 | 1 | 2 | 0 |
| 2012–13 | Espoo Blues U20 | U20 SM-liiga | 47 | 14 | 28 | 42 | 24 | 12 | 1 | 5 | 6 | 0 |
| 2013–14 | Porin Ässät U20 | U20 SM-liiga | 19 | 7 | 12 | 19 | 8 | 10 | 2 | 4 | 6 | 8 |
| 2013–14 | Porin Ässät | Liiga | 31 | 2 | 2 | 4 | 6 | — | — | — | — | — |
| 2014–15 | Porin Ässät U20 | U20 SM-liiga | 4 | 2 | 0 | 2 | 0 | — | — | — | — | — |
| 2014–15 | Porin Ässät | Liiga | 46 | 2 | 5 | 7 | 6 | — | — | — | — | — |
| 2014–15 | TUTO Hockey | Mestis | 8 | 2 | 3 | 5 | 6 | — | — | — | — | — |
| 2015–16 | Porin Ässät | Liiga | 46 | 0 | 2 | 2 | 12 | — | — | — | — | — |
| 2016–17 | Chamonix HC | Ligue Magnus | 11 | 0 | 0 | 0 | 2 | — | — | — | — | — |
| 2017–18 | Kokkolan Hermes | Mestis | 47 | 6 | 13 | 19 | 10 | — | — | — | — | — |
| Liiga totals | | | 123 | 4 | 9 | 13 | 24 | — | — | — | — | — |
| Mestis totals | | | 55 | 8 | 16 | 24 | 16 | — | — | — | — | — |
