= Juha Soukiala =

Finnish footballer (born 1983)

Personal information
- Date of birth: 12 February 1983 (age 43)
- Place of birth: Finland
- Height: 1.93 m (6 ft 4 in)
- Position: Goalkeeper

Team information
- Current team: PK-35
- Number: 12

Senior career*
Years	Team	Apps	(Gls)
2003–2004	FC Lahti	2	(0)
2009	Tampere United	11	(0)
2010–	PK-35		
- * Club domestic league appearances and goals as of 12 October 2009

Juha Soukiala (born 12 February 1983 in Espoo) is a Finnish football goalkeeper. Soukiala currently plays for PK-35 in the second highest Finnish league, Ykkönen. He has also represented Tampere United, FC Hämeenlinna, and FC Lahti on a senior level.
