= Kidnapping of Minna Nurminen =

2009 kidnapping in Finland

- Location: Etu-Töölö, Helsinki, Finland
- Date: 27 May 2009; 17 years ago
- Attack type: Kidnapping
- Victims: Minna Nurminen, aged 26
- Perpetrator: Juha Turunen
- Motive: Ransom of eight million euro

The kidnapping of Minna Nurminen took place in Helsinki, Finland on 27 May 2009.

== Events ==
Minna Nurminen, a 26-year-old member of the wealthy Herlin family, owners of KONE Corporation, disappeared from her home in Etu-Töölö, Helsinki, on 27 May 2009. She was reported missing on 30 May, and later found on 13 June, in a forest in Rusko.

The kidnapper was identified as Juha Turunen (born 22 September 1964 in Turku, now known as Juha Louhi), a former SDP city council candidate living in Turku. Turunen approached his victim in her home in Etu-Töölö by posing as a mailman. When Nurminen opened the door, Turunen knocked her down to the floor, tied her up, and placed her inside a large wooden box. Turunen then brought the box to the apartment in central Turku, where he released Nurminen into the apartment's specifically modified bedroom. For two weeks, Nurminen's only contact with the outside world was a television set and Turunen feeding her once per day. After the ransom was paid, Turunen brought Nurminen to a forest in Rusko, where she remained alone for several hours, until the police retrieved her.

Police arrested Juha Turunen and he confessed to the kidnapping. He is said to have asked for a ransom of 8 million euro, which her family paid him. Part of this ransom, in the form of 100 euro banknotes, was found by chance in a parking hall in Turku on 12 June. He hid millions of euros around Turku. The police said they probably recovered all of it.

Several authorities provided assistance to police, including Finnish Defence Forces, Border Guard and Customs.

== See also ==
- List of solved missing person cases (post-2000)
