= Ville Uusitalo =

Finnish ice hockey player (born 1979)

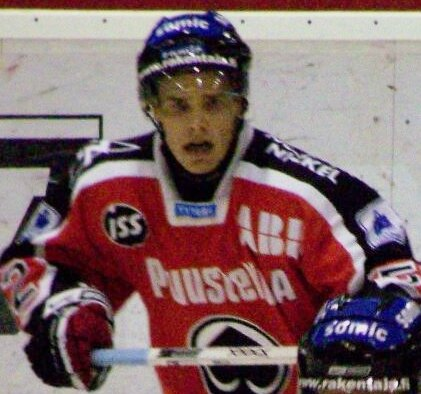
- Uusitalo with HC Ässät in 2008
- Born: July 6, 1979 (age 46) Espoo, Finland
- Height: 181 cm (5 ft 11 in)
- Weight: 79 kg (174 lb; 12 st 6 lb)
- Position: Defence
- Shot: Left
- Played for: HC Alleghe; Jokerit; Pelicans; HC Ässät
- Playing career: 2004–2016

Ville Aleksi Uusitalo (born 6 July 1979) is a Finnish retired ice hockey defenceman. He played a total of 578 regular season games in the Finnish Elite League, scoring 195 points and accumulating 441 penalty minutes, as well as 30 playoff games, scoring 11 points and 24 penalty minutes. Uusitalo served as the captain of the HC Ässät from 2011 to 2015 and led the team to the Finnish Championship in 2013. Additionally, he represented Jokerit and the Pelicans in the Finnish Elite League. Uusitalo also played abroad in France, Sweden, and Italy.

== Career ==
=== Junior and semi-pro ===
He played as a junior for Jäähonka and Espoon Palloseura, whose men's team Uusitalo played for the first time in the third tier, the Suomi-sarja, in the 2000–01 season. EPS won silver at the end of the season, but failed to advance to the Mestis qualifiers. For the 2001–02 season, Uusitalo moved to the third-highest league level in France, to Albatros de Brest in the FFHG Division 2. Brest won their league at the end of the season. In the 2002–03 season, Uusitalo continued his career in the third-highest league level in Sweden, in the I-division for the IK Pantern. For the 2003–04 season, he returned to Finland and moved to the Mestis promoted team, HC Salamat. Salamat was founded a year earlier to replace the Espoon Palloseura representative team. In his first season with Mestis, Uusitalo scored 18 points in 40 regular season games. Despite his position as a defenceman, he was Salamat's top scorer and led the Mestis defense in goal scoring.

=== Professional career ===
==== HC Alleghe, Jokerit, and Pelicans (2004–2008) ====
Uusitalo moved to the Italian Serie A team Alleghe Hockey for the 2004–05 season. He was the team's most effective defenseman with 12 points, along with Francesco De Biaso. Uusitalo returned to HC Salamat for the 2005–06 season, where he scored 26 points in 26 regular season games and tied for fourth place in the Mestis defensemen's points total at the end of the season with KooKoo's Jukka-Pekka Holopainen. In January 2006, Uusitalo, who led the Mestis defensemen's points total, moved to the Finnish Elite League team Jokerit on a contract that covered the rest of the season. He made his league debut at the age of 26 on 7 January 2006 against Kalevan Pallo, and also received one assist in the game. It remained Uusitalo's only highlight of the season in the Finnish Elite League, where he played 14 regular season games during the season.

Jokerit did not extend Uusitalo's contract, and he signed a two-year deal with the Lahti Pelicans for the 2006–07 season. Uusitalo was expected to take on a big role, but after some difficulties, he was moved to a smaller role. In his first full SM-liiga season, Uusitalo scored eight points in 53 regular season games, but his plus-minus reading of +12 was the Pelicans' best. Uusitalo's season ended in the final rounds of the regular season due to a sprained thumb. In the 2007–08 season, he scored his first goal in the Finnish Elite League and scored 15 points during the regular season.

==== HC Ässät (2008–2016) ====
Uusitalo joined HC Ässät on a two-year contract starting from the 2008–09 season. He was the team's most effective defenseman with 24 points, which tied Uusitalo for eighth place in the Finnish Elite League defencemen's points total. In the 2009–10 season, he became the HC Ässät alternate captain and scored his personal Finnish Elite League single-season goal record of nine goals. He was the HC Ässät's highest-scoring defenceman. However, his season ended in February 2010 when an opponent's skate cut his ankle. In December 2009, he signed a three-year contract extension with HC Ässät.

In the 2010–11 season, Uusitalo set his personal Finnish Elite League's single-season point record with 39 points and won the league's defensemen's point and assist totals. On 26 February 2011, Uusitalo recorded his 29th assist of the season and became the defenseman with the most assists in a single regular season in the HC Ässät club history, surpassing Pekka Rautakallio, who scored 28 assists in the 1978–79 season. Rautakallio was the HC Ässät head coach when his record was broken. Uusitalo won the HC Ässät plus-minus statistic with a score of +20. He was selected to the Finnish Elite League's All-Star team at the end of the season. At the end of the season, Uusitalo was nominated for the Pekka Rautakallio Trophy for best defender, but the award went to Sami Vatanen. In August 2011, Uusitalo signed a five-year contract extension with HC Ässät until spring 2016.

In the 2011–12 season, Uusitalo became the HC Ässät captain. He was the team's most effective defender with 32 points, which tied Uusitalo for fourth place in the Finnish Elite League defenders' points total. He won the HC Ässät plus-minus statistic with a score of +23. Uusitalo was chosen as the Finnish Elite League player of the month in September 2011. At the end of the season, he was again nominated for the Pekka Rautakallio award for the best defender, but the award was again given to Sami Vatanen. In the 2012–13 season, Uusitalo captained HC Ässät to their third Finnish Championship in club history.

Juha Kiilholma replaced Uusitalo as captain of HC Ässät in the 2015–16 season, his last with the team. However, Uusitalo was named captain of the HC Ässät's last match of the season on 10 March 2016 against Turun Palloseura. Correspondingly, Uusitalo's long-time defence pair, Tapio Sammalkangas, was named alternate captain for the match. The team's coaching staff allowed the duo to do a lap of honour around their home rink after HC Ässät took a timeout in the last period. After the season, Uusitalo still trained independently and waited for a good contract offer from Finland, but finally, in late October 2016, he announced on his Instagram account that he had ended his playing career.

After his playing career, Uusitalo has been a member of the Finnish Elite League's disciplinary delegation, which is in charge of suspending players.

== Career statistics ==
			Regular season					Playoffs
Season	Team	League	GP	G	A	Pts	PIM	GP	G	A	Pts	PIM
1994–95	Jäähonka U16	U16 SM-sarja	6	0	1	1	2	—	—	—	—	—
1997–98	EPS U20	U20 I-Divisioona	32	8	14	22	22	—	—	—	—	—
1998–99	EPS U20	U20 I-Divisioona	12	0	8	8	16	—	—	—	—	—
1999–00	EPS U20	U20 I-Divisioona	11	4	5	9	14	—	—	—	—	—
2000–01	EPS	Suomi-sarja	34	4	22	26	30	4	0	4	4	2
2001–02	Brest Albatros Hockey	France3	14	18	22	40	16	—	—	—	—	—
2002–03	IK Pantern	Division 1	55	12	16	28	78	—	—	—	—	—
2003–04	HC Salamat	Mestis	40	12	6	18	16	3	0	0	0	6
2004–05	HC Alleghe	Italy	33	3	9	12	26	—	—	—	—	—
2005–06	HC Salamat	Mestis	26	9	17	26	34	—	—	—	—	—
2005–06	Jokerit	SM-liiga	14	0	1	1	6	—	—	—	—	—
2006–07	Lahti Pelicans	SM-liiga	53	0	8	8	34	—	—	—	—	—
2007–08	Lahti Pelicans	SM-liiga	54	7	8	15	77	2	0	0	0	2
2008–09	Porin Ässät	SM-liiga	57	7	17	24	62	—	—	—	—	—
2009–10	Porin Ässät	SM-liiga	48	9	11	20	48	—	—	—	—	—
2010–11	Porin Ässät	SM-liiga	59	7	32	39	28	6	1	2	3	12
2011–12	Porin Ässät	SM-liiga	60	6	26	32	50	4	0	0	0	0
2012–13	Porin Ässät	SM-liiga	59	1	16	17	20	16	0	8	8	8
2013–14	Porin Ässät	Liiga	60	2	14	16	46	—	—	—	—	—
2014–15	Porin Ässät	Liiga	60	0	13	13	44	2	0	0	0	2
2015–16	Porin Ässät	Liiga	54	1	9	10	26	—	—	—	—	—
SM-liiga totals			578	40	155	195	441	30	1	10	11	24

Sporting positions
Preceded by Matti Kuparinen	Porin Ässät captain 2011–15	Succeeded by Juha Kiilholma
