= Lauri Parikka =

Finnish painter (1895–1965)

Lauri Arvid Parikka (23 September 1895 Helsinki – 29 December 1965 Helsinki) was a Finnish painter. His parents were Antti Parikka and Erika Juhontytär. Parikka studied at the Helsinki University of Art and Design (1911–1913) and at the Drawing School of the Finnish Art Association (1915). His first public showing came in 1915 in Helsinki. Parikka participated in Suomen taiteilijat exhibitions (1915–1919).
