= Juha-Petteri Purolinna =

Finnish ice hockey player

- Born: 11 July 1988 (age 36); Helsinki, Finland
- Height: 6 ft 3 in (191 cm)
- Weight: 198 lb (90 kg; 14 st 2 lb)
- Position: Defence
- Shoots: Left
- SM-liiga team: Lukko
- Playing career: 2007–present

Juha-Petteri Purolinna is a Finnish ice hockey defenceman who currently plays professionally in Finland for Lukko of the SM-liiga.
