= Oskari Lehtinen =

Finnish ice hockey player

- Born: 9 February 1994 (age 31) Turku, Finland
- Height: 6 ft 0 in (183 cm)
- Weight: 183 lb (83 kg; 13 st 1 lb)
- Position: Left wing
- Shoots: Right
- Liiga team Former teams: SaiPa; Ässät; HPK
- NHL draft: Undrafted
- Playing career: 2013–present

Oskari Lehtinen (born 9 February 1994) is a Finnish ice hockey player. His is currently playing with SaiPa in the Finnish Liiga.

Lehtinen made his Liiga debut playing with Ässät during the 2013–14 Liiga season.

== Career statistics ==
			Regular season					Playoffs
Season	Team	League	GP	G	A	Pts	PIM	GP	G	A	Pts	PIM
2008–09	HC TPS U16	U16 SM-sarja Q	4	2	3	5	18	—	—	—	—	—
2008–09	HC TPS U16	U16 SM-sarja	23	15	12	27	38	6	3	3	6	12
2009–10	HC TPS U16	U16 SM-sarja Q	1	8	7	15	0	—	—	—	—	—
2009–10	HC TPS U16	U16 SM-sarja	4	3	6	9	10	6	4	4	8	37
2009–10	HC TPS U18	U18 SM-sarja Q	8	5	2	7	4	—	—	—	—	—
2009–10	HC TPS U18	U18 SM-sarja	26	9	14	23	40	3	2	0	2	4
2010–11	HC TPS U18	U18 SM-sarja Q	2	2	4	6	2	—	—	—	—	—
2010–11	HC TPS U18	U18 SM-sarja	14	11	5	16	38	13	2	4	6	12
2010–11	HC TPS U20	U20 SM-liiga	25	2	3	5	8	—	—	—	—	—
2011–12	Lukko U18	U18 SM-sarja Q	4	0	0	0	6	—	—	—	—	—
2011–12	Lukko U18	U18 I-Divisioona	10	1	5	6	12	—	—	—	—	—
2011–12	Lukko U20	U20 SM-liiga	8	1	0	1	10	—	—	—	—	—
2012–13	Lukko U20	U20 SM-liiga	21	1	0	1	24	—	—	—	—	—
2012–13	TUTO Hockey U20	U20 Mestis	9	3	5	8	33	—	—	—	—	—
2012–13	TUTO Hockey	Mestis	1	0	0	0	0	—	—	—	—	—
2013–14	Porin Ässät U20	U20 SM-liiga	41	23	15	38	44	10	4	2	6	14
2013–14	Porin Ässät	Liiga	9	0	2	2	0	—	—	—	—	—
2014–15	TUTO Hockey	Mestis	38	12	7	19	20	14	1	2	3	6
2014–15	Porin Ässät	Liiga	5	1	2	3	0	—	—	—	—	—
2015–16	Mörrums GoIS IK	Hockeyettan	8	1	1	2	6	—	—	—	—	—
2015–16	Lindlövens IF	Hockeyettan	15	2	6	8	6	—	—	—	—	—
2015–16	TUTO Hockey	Mestis	6	1	0	1	0	—	—	—	—	—
2016–17	Jokipojat	Mestis	43	10	14	24	67	4	1	0	1	2
2017–18	Jokipojat	Mestis	49	22	22	44	83	9	5	2	7	6
2018–19	HPK	Liiga	2	0	1	1	6	—	—	—	—	—
2018–19	SaiPa	Liiga	41	3	7	10	14	1	0	0	0	0
2019–20	HC TPS	Liiga	31	2	5	7	2	—	—	—	—	—
2021–22	Chiefs	2. Divisioona	8	9	1	10	6	1	0	0	0	0
Liiga totals			88	6	17	23	22	1	0	0	0	0
Mestis totals			137	45	43	88	170	27	7	4	11	14
