= Juha Metsäperä =

Finnish singer and songwriter

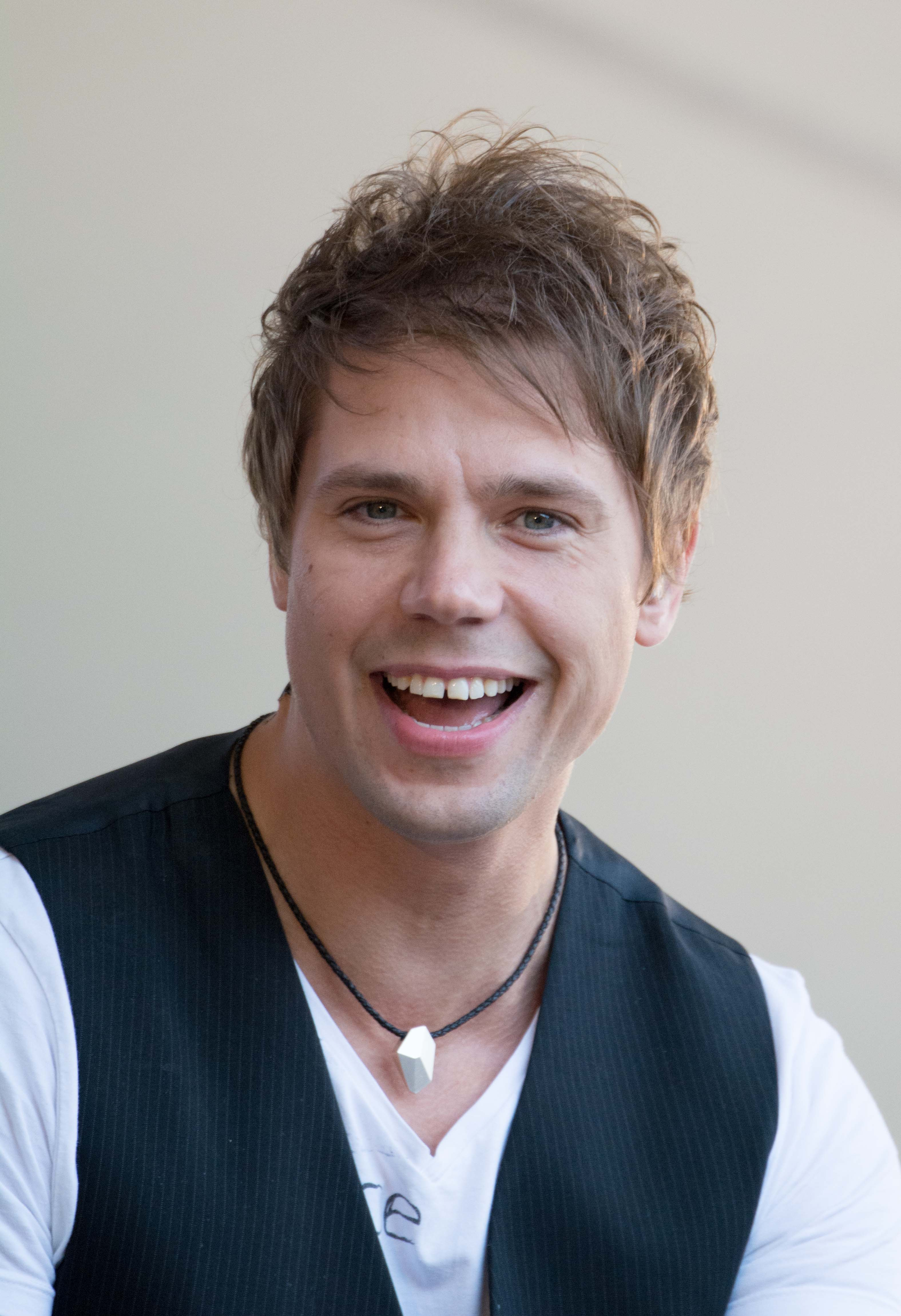
- Metsäperä in 2013

Background information
- Born: Juha Metsäperä; 1979 (age 46–47); Oulu, Finland
- Genres: Pop
- Occupations: Singer, songwriter
- Years active: 2006–present
- Label: Warner Music
- Website: uhametsapera.net

Juha Metsäperä (born 1979) is a Finnish pop singer and songwriter. He became known with his debut album Pienen hetken in 2006 and went on tour with his band through Finland, playing 150 gigs in a year. He has also participated in the songwriting and composing songs, including songs in the album Olen lähelläsi. Metsäperä is best known for the song "Äiti" (meaning mother in Finnish) from his album Hyvä sydän.

== Discography ==
=== Albums ===
Year	Album	Peak position FIN
2006	Pienen hetken	-
2007	Opitko rakastamaan	32
2009	Olen lähelläsi	-
2012	Hyvä sydän	26

=== Singles ===
- 2009: "Olen lähelläsi"
- 2012: "Äiti"
