= Patrik Moisio =

Finnish ice hockey player

- Born: February 4, 1992 (age 33) Turku, Finland
- Height: 6 ft 2 in (188 cm)
- Weight: 196 lb (89 kg; 14 st 0 lb)
- Position: Forward
- Shoots: Left
- BeNe League team Former teams: Eaters Limburg; Ässät; Ilves; HC TPS; Nikko Icebucks; Coventry Blaze; Edinburgh Capitals; Donbass Donetsk; Podhale Nowy Targ; RoKi
- NHL draft: Undrafted
- Playing career: 2011–present

Patrik Moisio (born February 4, 1992) is a Finnish professional ice hockey player. He is currently playing for Eaters Limburg of the Dutch BeNe League.

Moisio made his Liiga debut playing with Ässät during the 2012–13 Liiga season. In November 2017, Moisio penned a short-term deal with UK EIHL side Coventry Blaze, arriving from Nikko Icebucks.

In December 2017, after his short-term deal with the Blaze came to an end, Moisio signed for fellow EIHL side Edinburgh Capitals.

Moisio has subsequently played for Ukraine's Donbass Donetsk, Polish side Podhale Nowy Targ, Finnish side RoKi and Dutch team Eaters Limburg.
