= Veikko Honkanen =

Finnish politician (1908–1999)

Veikko Honkanen (6 September 1908, in Varpaisjärvi – 15 September 1999) was a Finnish politician. He served as a member of the Parliament of Finland from 1962 to 1966 and again from 1967 to 1970, representing the Agrarian League, in 1965 renamed the Centre Party.
