= Jyri Marttinen =

Finnish ice hockey player

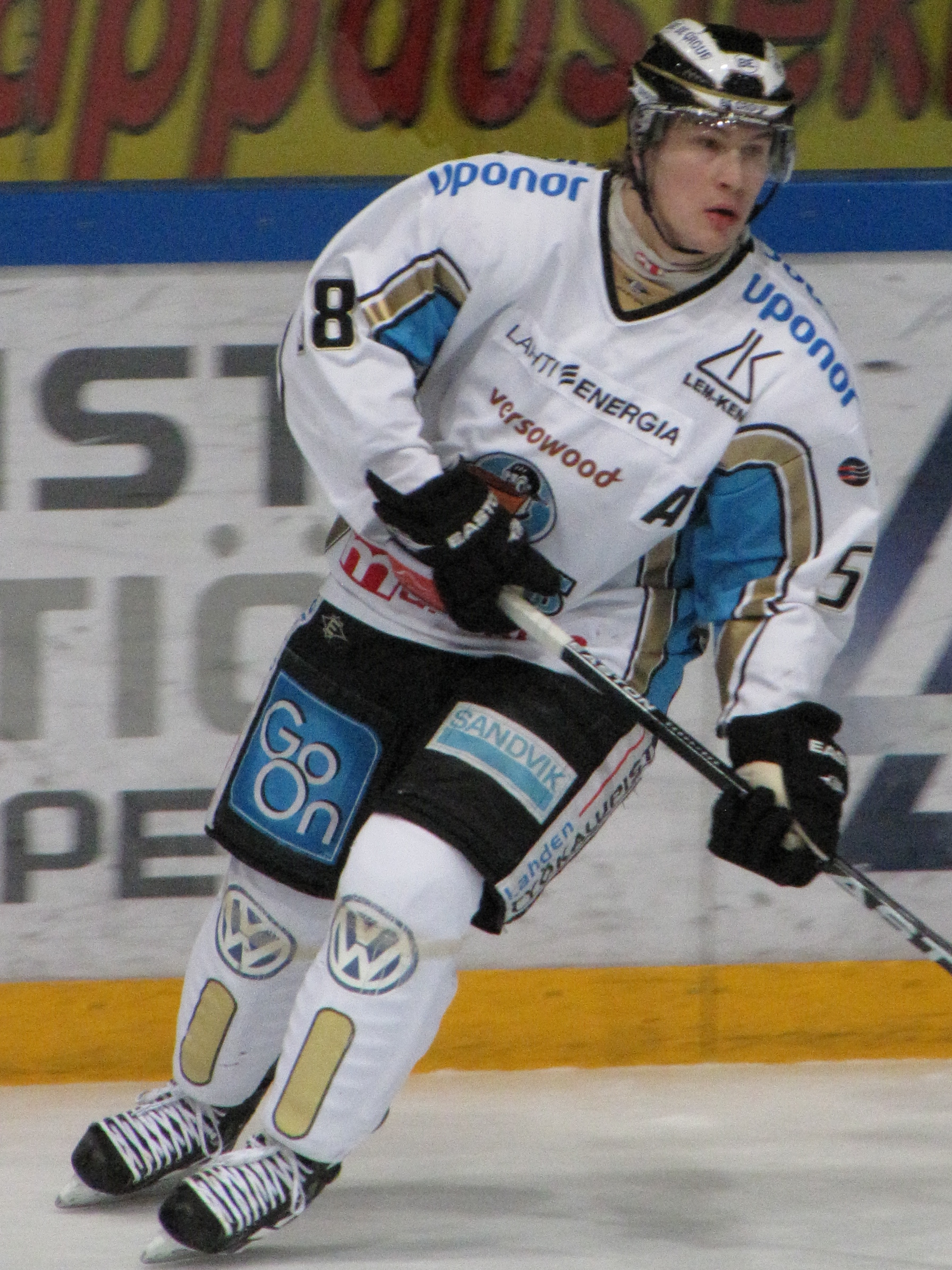
- Born: September 1, 1982 (age 43) Jyväskylän mlk, Finland
- Height: 5 ft 11.5 in (182 cm)
- Weight: 196 lb (89 kg; 14 st 0 lb)
- Position: Defence
- Shoots: Left
- team Former teams: Hockey Club de Caen. Drakkars; JYP; Malmö Redhawks; Timrå IK; Skellefteå AIK; Pelicans; Ässät; HC 07 Detva
- National team: Finland
- NHL draft: 238th overall, 2002; Calgary Flames
- Playing career: 2000–present

Medal record

Representing Finland

Ice hockey

World Championships
Silver medal – second place	2014 Minsk	

Jyri Marttinen (born September 1, 1982) is a Finnish ice hockey defenceman.

== Career statistics ==
=== Regular season and playoffs ===
			Regular season					Playoffs
Season	Team	League	GP	G	A	Pts	PIM	GP	G	A	Pts	PIM
1997–98	JYP	FIN U16	22	3	3	6	34	—	—	—	—	—
1999–2000	JYP	FIN U20	1	0	0	0	2	—	—	—	—	—
2000–01	JYP	FIN U20	40	2	8	10	73	6	1	1	2	6
2000–01	JYP	SM-liiga	8	1	0	1	6	—	—	—	—	—
2001–02	JYP	FIN U20	5	0	2	2	2	1	0	0	0	0
2001–02	JYP	SM-liiga	50	1	4	5	67	—	—	—	—	—
2002–03	JYP	SM-liiga	29	3	2	5	32	—	—	—	—	—
2003–04	JYP	SM-liiga	54	6	13	19	115	2	0	0	0	2
2004–05	JYP	SM-liiga	46	3	1	4	60	3	0	2	2	0
2005–06	JYP	SM-liiga	50	11	8	19	126	3	0	1	1	4
2006–07	JYP	SM-liiga	44	13	17	30	78	—	—	—	—	—
2006–07	Malmö Redhawks	SEL	7	1	0	1	28	—	—	—	—	—
2007–08	Timrå IK	SEL	17	0	2	2	20	—	—	—	—	—
2007–08	Skellefteå AIK	SEL	36	6	10	16	71	2	0	0	0	0
2008–09	Skellefteå AIK	SEL	38	6	13	19	107	11	0	1	1	20
2009–10	Skellefteå AIK	SEL	52	4	13	17	91	11	0	2	2	10
2010–11	Pelicans	SM-liiga	52	5	10	15	99	—	—	—	—	—
2011–12	Pelicans	SM-liiga	48	4	3	7	95	17	0	1	1	30
2012–13	Ässät	SM-liiga	56	4	9	13	68	14	2	4	6	10
2013–14	Ässät	Liiga	56	4	7	11	160	—	—	—	—	—
2014–15	Ässät	Liiga	58	2	5	7	34	2	0	0	0	0
2015–16	Ässät	Liiga	21	1	9	10	8	—	—	—	—	—
2016–17	Ässät	Liiga	45	5	13	18	97	—	—	—	—	—
2017–18	Lukko	Liiga	44	2	7	9	50	2	0	0	0	2
2018–19	Lukko	Liiga	4	0	0	0	2	—	—	—	—	—
2018–19	Ässät	Liiga	49	6	12	18	30	—	—	—	—	—
2019–20	Ässät	Liiga	44	4	4	8	38	—	—	—	—	—
2020–21	Pelikaanit	FIN.4	6	1	6	7	8	—	—	—	—	—
2020–21	HC 07 WPC Detva	SVK	5	0	3	3	6	—	—	—	—	—
2020–21	GKS Katowice	POL	12	0	6	6	18	14	0	4	4	10
2021–22	Drakkars de Caen	FRA.2	25	5	7	12	73	4	0	3	3	4
SM-liiga/Liiga totals			758	75	124	199	1165	43	2	8	10	48
SEL totals			150	17	38	55	317	24	0	3	3	30

=== International ===
Year	Team	Event	GP	G	A	Pts	PIM
2002	Finland	WJC	7	1	2	3	8
2014	Finland	WC	10	0	0	0	4
Senior totals			10	0	0	0	4
