= Juha Tuomi =

Finnish footballer (born 1989)

Personal information
- Date of birth: 7 November 1989 (age 36)
- Place of birth: Finland
- Height: 1.84 m (6 ft 1/2 in)
- Position: Goalkeeper

Senior career*
Years	Team	Apps	(Gls)
2008–	Lahti	26	(0)

International career
- Finland U-17
- Finland U-19
	Finland U21	1	(0)
- * Club domestic league appearances and goals as of 15 July 2010

Juha Tuomi (born 7 November 1989) was a Finnish football player, most recently playing for Reipas Lahti.

Tuomi moved to FC Lahti for the 2008 season from FC Reippa. He debuted in the league on 25 May 2008 in a match against FF Jaro.

Tuomi has also played for youth national teams in Finland. On 15 May 2009, the head coach of the Finnish under-21 national team, Markku Kanerva, selected Tuomi to the 40-player candidate list, from which the final under-21 team would be selected for the European Championship final tournament in Sweden.

In April 2014, Tuomi signed a contract with FC Hämeenlinna. However, due to civil unrest, he had to leave Hämeenlinna after only four matches. In the matches he played, Tuomi saw two wins, two losses, and one clean sheet.

In January 2018, Tuomi was transferred back to Reipas Lahti, where he remained until 2020.
