= Miko Malkamäki =

Finnish ice hockey player

- Born: 1 May 1988 (age 37) Kokkola, Finland
- Height: 6 ft 1 in (185 cm)
- Weight: 183 lb (83 kg; 13 st 1 lb)
- Position: Defence
- Shot: Left
- Played for: Tappara; HC Bílí Tygři Liberec; Ässät; Vaasan Sport; Lukko
- NHL draft: Undrafted
- Playing career: 2007–2016

Miko Malkamäki (born 1 May 1988) is a Finnish former professional ice hockey defenceman who played in the Liiga for Tappara, Ässät, Vaasan Sport, and Lukko. He also played for HC Bílí Tygři Liberec in the Czech Extraliga (ELH).
