= Jani Honkanen =

Finnish ice hockey player

- Born: September 20, 1979 (age 46) Espoo, Finland
- Height: 6 ft 1 in (185 cm)
- Weight: 198 lb (90 kg; 14 st 2 lb)
- Position: Defence
- Shoots: Left
- KHC team Former teams: Arystan Temirtau; HIFK; SaiPa; Pelicans; HPK; Tappara; Ässät
- NHL draft: Undrafted
- Playing career: 1999–present

Jani Honkanen (born September 20, 1979) is a Finnish ice hockey player. He currently plays with Arystan Temirtau in the Kazakhstan Hockey Championship.

Honkanen won the 2012-13 SM-liiga championship while playing with Ässät.
