= Patrik Parkkonen =

Finnish ice hockey player

- Born: 23 January 1993 (age 33) Porvoo, Finland
- Height: 5 ft 9 in (175 cm)
- Weight: 187 lb (85 kg; 13 st 5 lb)
- Position: Defence
- Shoots: Left
- team Former teams: Free agent Ässät; Orli Znojmo; Chicago Wolves; HC Energie Karlovy Vary; HK Nitra
- NHL draft: Undrafted
- Playing career: 2012–present

Patrik Parkkonen (born 23 January 1993) is a Finnish professional ice hockey defenceman. He is currently a free agent.

== Playing career ==
Coming through the youth system of HIFK, he spent two years in Canada, playing for the Medicine Hat Tigers of the WHL (2010–2012), before returning to his native Finland. Parkkonen made his SM-liiga debut playing with Ässät during the 2012–13 SM-liiga season. Following a three-year stint at Ässät, Parkkonen signed with Lausitzer Füchse of Germany's second division DEL2. In December 2015, his original short-term contract was extended until the end of the 2015–16 season.

After three European seasons away from Finland, Parkkonen opted to return to North America as a professional, agreeing to a contract with the Wichita Thunder of the ECHL on 25 September 2019.
