= Severi Sillanpää =

Finnish ice hockey player

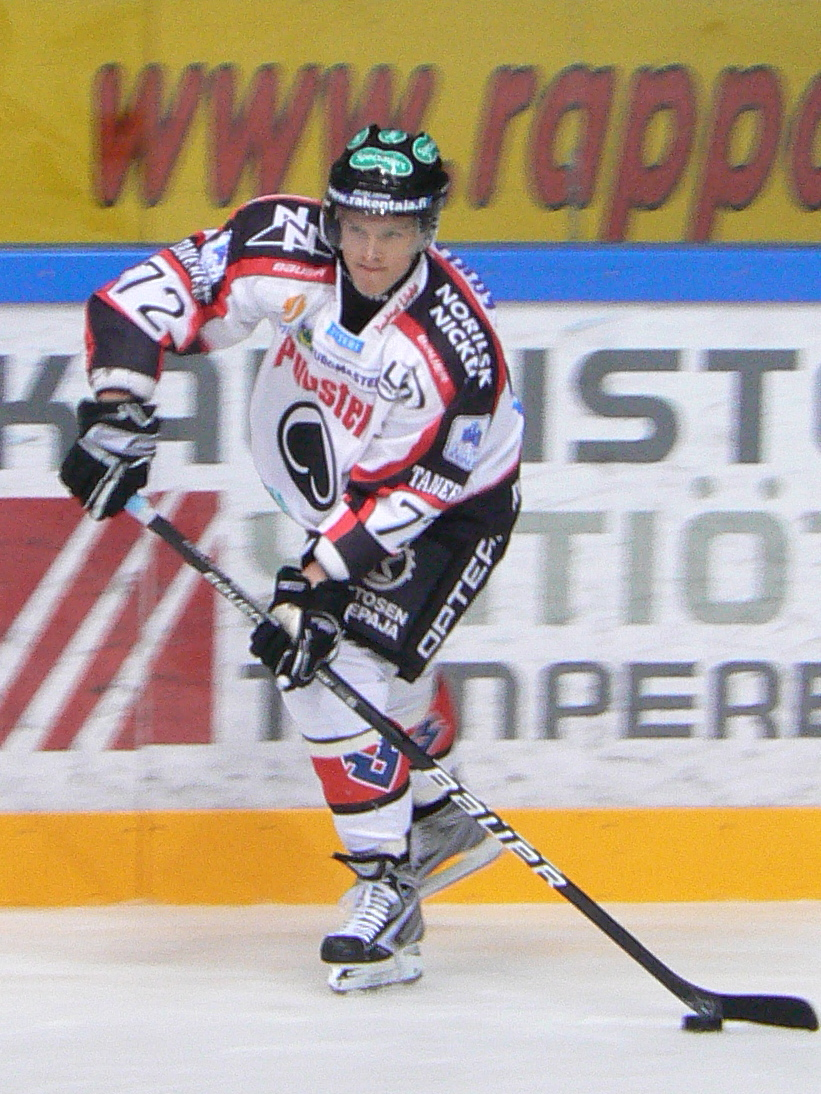
- Born: February 7, 1988 (age 37) Pori
- Height: 6 ft 0 in (183 cm)
- Weight: 185 lb (84 kg; 13 st 3 lb)
- Position: Forward
- Shoots: L
- Liiga team Former teams: JYP Jyväskylä; Ässät (Liiga); Karlskrona HK (Allsv.); Kiekko-Vantaa (Mestis); Jokerit (KHL)
- Playing career: 2008–present

Severi Sillanpää is a Finnish professional ice hockey forward who currently plays for JYP Jyväskylä of the SM-liiga.
