= Juha Järvenpää =

Finnish ice hockey player

- Born: May 11, 1989 (age 36) Noormarkku, FIN
- Height: 6 ft 0 in (183 cm)
- Weight: 181 lb (82 kg; 12 st 13 lb)
- Position: Goaltender
- Catches: Left
- Liiga team Former teams: KooKoo; Ässät; Ilves
- NHL draft: Undrafted
- Playing career: 2008–present

Juha Järvenpää (born May 11, 1989) is a Finnish professional ice hockey goaltender. He currently plays for Dornbirn Bulldogs in Austria.

Järvenpää made his Sm-liiga debut playing with Ässät during the 2010–11 SM-liiga season.
