= Valtteri Parikka =

Finnish ice hockey player

- Born: December 8, 1994 (age 30) Järvenpää, Finland
- Height: 5 ft 10 in (178 cm)
- Weight: 172 lb (78 kg; 12 st 4 lb)
- Position: Defence
- Shoots: Left
- Liiga team Former teams: KalPa; Ässät; Pelicans
- NHL draft: Undrafted
- Playing career: 2013–present

Valtteri Parikka (born December 8, 1994) is a Finnish ice hockey defenceman. His is currently playing with KalPa in the Finnish Liiga.

Parikka made his Liiga debut playing with Ässät during the 2013–14 Liiga season.
