= Tapio Sammalkangas =

Finnish ice hockey player

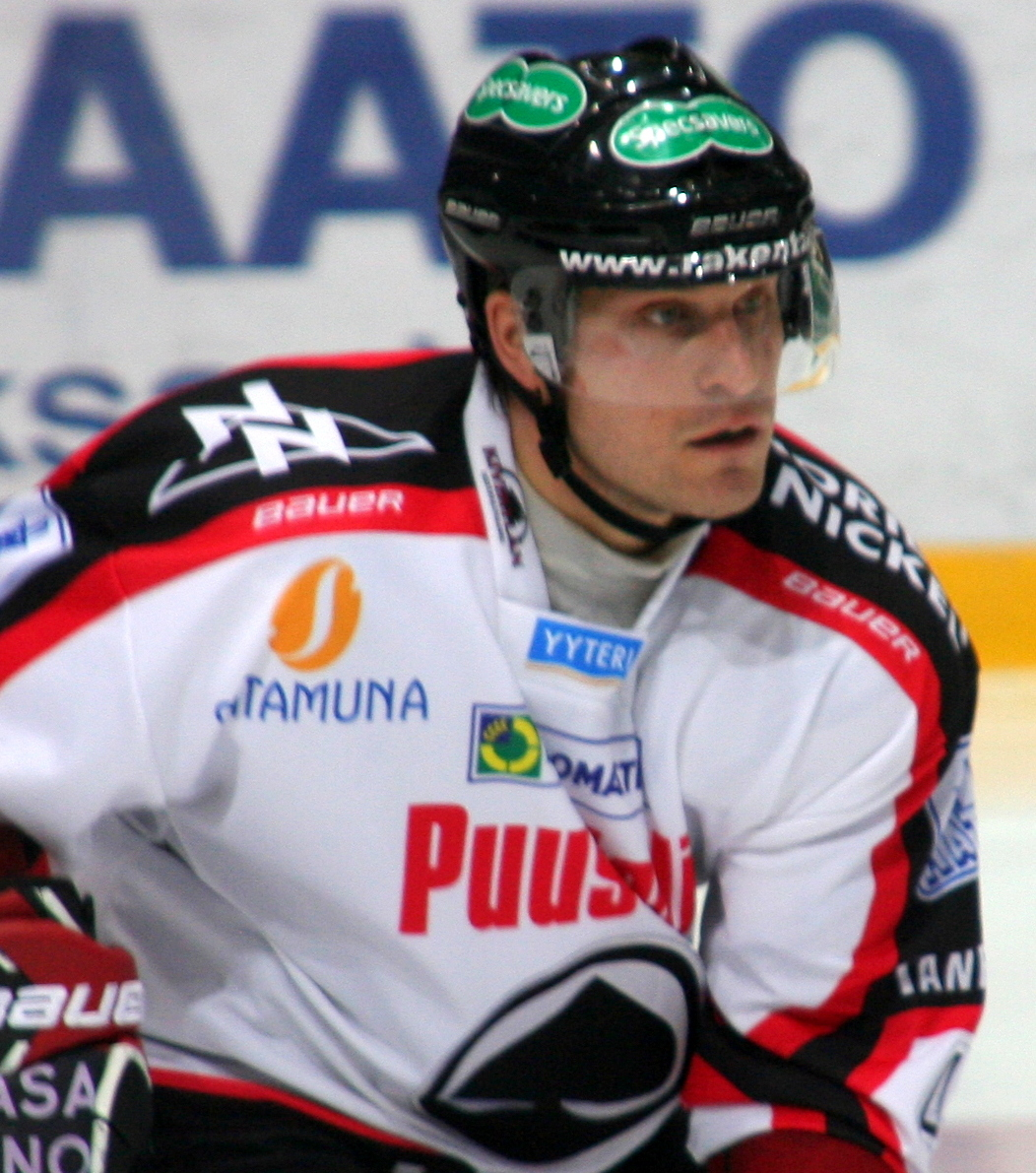
- Sammalkangas with the Porin Ässät in 2010
- Born: March 16, 1980 (age 45) Tampere, Finland
- Position: Defence
- Played for: Ilves; AaB Ishockey; Ässät; Tappara
- Playing career: 1998–2017

Tapio Sammalkangas (born March 16, 1980) is a Finnish former professional ice hockey defenceman. Sammalkangas played 671 games in the Finnish Elite League scoring 94 points and 803 penalty minutes. He won the Finnish Championship with the Porin Ässät in 2013 and Tappara in 2017. He was known as a defensive defenceman.

== Early life ==
Tapio Sammalkangas was born in Tampere, Finland on 16 March 1980. His father, Timo, played ice hockey as a junior with Ilves and in Sweden's lower divisions.

== Career ==
=== Junior ===
Tapio Sammalkangas started ice hockey in the Tampereen Ilves as a four-year old. He played as a forward until the age of ten. Sammalkangas won the U18 bronze medal with Ilves in 1997 and U20 silver in 1999.

=== Professional (1998–2017) ===
Sammalkangas made his professional debut with Ilves in the 1998 SM-liiga playoffs. He played three games with no points. Ilves lost the Kanada-malja finals to IFK Helsingfors. The 1999–2000 season was his actual rookie season in the SM-liiga. He played 47 regular season games with Ilves, scoring three points and 56 penalty minutes.

Sammalkangas joined the Porin Ässät for the 2006–07 season. He won the Kanada-malja championship with the club in 2013 and served as alternate captain from 2011 to 2015. He played the 2016–17 season with Tappara and won the championship. He retired after the season. In total, Sammalkangas played eleven seasons with the Porin Ässät.

== Career statistics ==
			Regular season					Playoffs
Season	Team	League	GP	G	A	Pts	PIM	GP	G	A	Pts	PIM
1997–98	Ilves U20	Jr. A SM-liiga	16	1	1	2	22	—	—	—	—	—
1997–98	Ilves	Liiga	—	—	—	—	—	3	0	0	0	0
1998–99	Ilves U20	Jr. A SM-liiga	30	4	7	11	64	9	0	1	1	8
1999–00	Ilves U20	Jr. A SM-liiga	9	1	2	3	55	—	—	—	—	—
1999–00	Ilves	Liiga	47	0	3	3	56	3	0	0	0	0
2000–01	Ilves U20	Jr. A SM-liiga	1	0	0	0	0	—	—	—	—	—
2000–01	Ilves	Liiga	54	3	4	7	34	9	1	0	1	4
2001–02	Ässät	Liiga	52	5	10	15	70	—	—	—	—	—
2002–03	Ilves	Liiga	51	0	1	1	22	—	—	—	—	—
2003–04	Fresno Falcons	ECHL	70	1	18	19	84	—	—	—	—	—
2004–05	AaB Ishockey	Denmark	29	2	5	7	46	16	1	1	2	31
2005–06	AaB Ishockey	Denmark	36	4	11	15	65	17	3	6	9	50
2006–07	Ässät	Liiga	49	9	4	13	98	—	—	—	—	—
2007–08	Ässät	Liiga	49	1	6	7	42	—	—	—	—	—
2008–09	Ässät	Liiga	55	2	4	6	116	—	—	—	—	—
2009–10	Ässät	Liiga	24	1	0	1	16	—	—	—	—	—
2009–10	LeKi	Mestis	4	0	0	0	6	—	—	—	—	—
2010–11	Ässät	Liiga	48	2	6	8	77	6	0	0	0	6
2011–12	Ässät	Liiga	55	3	8	11	71	2	0	0	0	27
2012–13	Ässät	Liiga	56	1	8	9	38	16	1	1	2	6
2013–14	Ässät	Liiga	24	1	3	4	41	—	—	—	—	—
2014–15	Ässät	Liiga	38	1	2	3	63	2	0	0	0	2
2015–16	Ässät	Liiga	42	0	3	3	47	—	—	—	—	—
2016–17	Tappara	Liiga	27	1	2	3	12	1	0	0	0	0
Liiga totals			671	30	64	94	803	56	5	4	9	59
