= Karri Kivi =

Finnish ice hockey player and coach

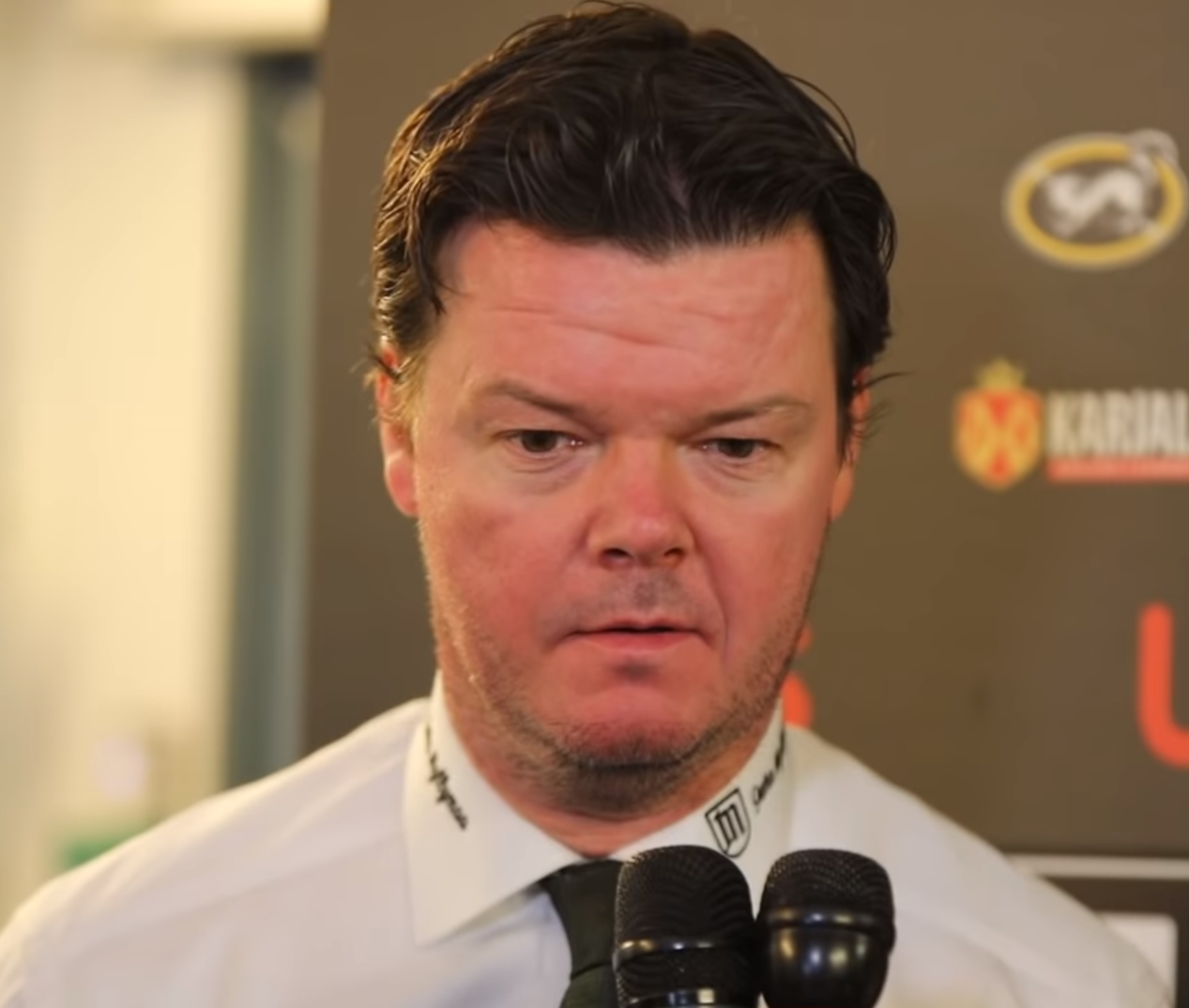
- Born: January 31, 1970 (age 55) Turku, Finland
- Position: Defence
- Shot: Left
- Played for: Ilves tampere TPS Turku; Kiekko-67; Ässät Pori; AIK IF; Kärpät Oulu
- Current coach: -
- National team: Finland
- NHL draft: 233rd, 1990; Vancouver Canucks
- Playing career: 1988–2001
- Coaching career: 2002–present

Karri Kivi (born 31 January 1970, in Turku) is a Finnish former ice hockey player and hockey coach.

== Playing career ==
He started his professional career in Ilves in 1988-89 and played until 2001, representing also TPS, Ässät and Kärpät in the SM-liiga. His playing career also included one season in Sweden with AIK. He was drafted by the NHL's Vancouver Canucks in 1990 in the 12th round, 223rd overall, though he ultimately would never play with the club. His career highlights included reaching the Liiga finals with Ilves in 1990 and earning promotion to Finland's top-tier with Kärpät in 2000.

== Coaching career ==
After his playing career, Kivi started his coaching career as an assistant coach at Liiga club Ässät. In 2011, he was promoted to the head coaching job and led Ässät to the Finnish championship in 2013, while receiving Coach of the Year honors. After this successful season, he joined the coaching staff of the Finnish ice hockey federation and coached Finland's men's national junior ice hockey team to the title at the World Junior Championship in 2014.

Prior to the 2014-15 season, Kivi accepted the job as head coach of Traktor Chelyabinsk of the Kontinental Hockey League (KHL). He was relieved of his duties in October 2014. Kivi was named head coach of Finnish Liiga side Ilves prior to the 2016-17 campaign. Kivi was signed as head coach for Ässät in the middle of the 2021–22 season.

- 2002–2006 (Finland) Ässät Pori - assistant coach
- 2006–2007 (Finland) Forssan Palloseura - head coach
- 2007–2009 (Finland) Ässät Pori U20 - head coach
- 2009–2010 (Finland) Ässät Pori - assistant coach
- 2011–2013 (Finland) Ässät Pori - head coach
- 2014–2015 (Russia) Traktor Chelyabinsk - head coach
- 2016–2020 (Finland) Ilves Tampere - head coach
- 2021–2023 (Finland) Ässät Pori - head coach
- 2023– (Slovakia) HC Nové Zámky - head coach

== Career statistics ==
			Regular season					Playoffs
Season	Team	League	GP	G	A	Pts	PIM	GP	G	A	Pts	PIM
1988–89	Ilves	SM-liiga	39	5	7	12	10	5	0	0	0	0
1989–90	Ilves	SM-liiga	43	6	15	21	14	8	1	4	5	2
1990–91	Ilves	SM-liiga	43	2	9	11	18	—	—	—	—	—
1991–92	TPS	SM-liiga	33	3	1	4	14	3	0	0	0	0
1992–93	Kiekko-67	FinD1	11	2	7	9	4	—	—	—	—	—
1992–93	Ässät	SM-liiga	34	2	11	13	16	—	—	—	—	—
1993–94	Ässät	SM-liiga	48	1	12	13	49	5	1	2	3	0
1994–95	Ässät	SM-liiga	50	10	18	28	20	7	1	1	2	2
1995–96	Ässät	SM-liiga	50	4	12	16	18	3	0	2	2	2
1996–97	Ässät	SM-liiga	50	1	16	17	18	4	0	0	0	0
1997–98	AIK	SEL	35	3	1	4	6	—	—	—	—	—
1998–99	Kärpät	FinD1	46	3	8	11	42	5	0	0	0	0
1999–00	Kärpät	FinD1	44	2	8	10	24	—	—	—	—	—
2000–01	Kärpät	SM-liiga	39	0	1	1	18	9	0	0	0	2
SM-liiga totals			429	34	102	136	195	52	4	11	15	8
