= Jesse Huhtala (ice hockey) =

Finnish ice hockey player

- Born: May 9, 1993 (age 32) Pori, Finland
- Height: 6 ft 1 in (185 cm)
- Weight: 181 lb (82 kg; 12 st 13 lb)
- Position: Forward
- Suomi-sarja team Former teams: Karhu HT; Ässät
- NHL draft: Undrafted
- Playing career: 2013–present

Jesse Huhtala (born May 9, 1993) is a Finnish professional ice hockey player. He is currently playing for Karhu HT of the Suomi-sarja.

Huhtala played five games in the SM-liiga for Ässät during the 2012–13 SM-liiga season.
