= 2014 World Junior Ice Hockey Championships =

U20 ice hockey tournament in Malmö, Sweden

2014 IIHF World U20 Championship

Tournament details
- Host country: Sweden
- City: Malmö
- Venue(s): Malmö Arena and Malmö Isstadion (in 1 host city)
- Dates: December 26, 2013 – January 5, 2014
- Teams: 10

Final positions
- Champions: Finland (3rd title)
- Runners-up: Sweden
- Third place: Russia
- Fourth place: Canada

Tournament statistics
- Games played: 31
- Goals scored: 202 (6.52 per game)
- Attendance: 144,268 (4,654 per game)
- Scoring leader: (Finland) Teuvo Teräväinen (15 points)

Awards
- MVP: (Sweden) Filip Forsberg

Official website
- 2014 World Juniors

The 2014 World Junior Ice Hockey Championships (formerly called the IIHF U20 World Championship) was the 38th edition of the Ice Hockey World Junior Championship (WJHC), hosted in Malmö, Sweden. The 13,700-seat Malmö Arena was the main venue, with the smaller Malmö Isstadion the secondary venue. It began on December 26, 2013, and ended with the gold medal game on January 5, 2014.

Finland defeated host team Sweden in the final 3–2 in overtime and won their first gold medal since 1998, as well as their third gold medal in total. It was also their first medal in the tournament since 2006. Sweden earned their second consecutive silver medal, their ninth silver medal in total, as well as their third consecutive medal in the tournament.

For the first time since 1979–81, Canada failed to capture a medal for the second consecutive year by losing the bronze medal game 1–2 to Russia, who captured the team's fourth consecutive medal at the tournament. The 2014 tournament marked the first time since 1998 that all three medalists were European teams.

A total of 144,268 spectators attended the 31 games, setting a new attendance record for IIHF World Junior Championship tournaments hosted in Europe. 12,023 spectators attended the gold medal game, setting a new record for a single IIHF World Junior Championship game in Europe.

The playoff round was expanded to eight teams (again), with group leaders no longer getting a bye into the semifinals, the first time since the 2002 tournament.

== Venues ==
Malmö	Malmö is located in Sweden	Malmö
Malmö Arena Capacity: 12,500	Malmö is located in Sweden	Malmö Isstadion Capacity: 5,800

== Match officials ==
The IIHF selected 12 referees and 10 linesmen to work the 2014 IIHF Ice Hockey U20 World Championship.
They were the following:

Referees

- (Sweden) Tobias Björk
- (Finland) Antti Boman
- (Denmark) Jacob Grumsen
- (Czech Republic) Rene Hradil
- (Slovakia) Jozef Kubus
- (Sweden) Marcus Linde
- (United States) Timothy Mayer
- (Canada) Steve Papp
- (Canada) Devin Piccott
- (Russia) Evgeniy Romasko
- (Switzerland) Daniel Stricker
- (Switzerland) Marc Wiegand

Linesmen

- (Japan) Kenji Kosaka
- (Germany) Andreas Kowert
- (Canada) Benoît Martineau
- (United States) Fraser McIntyre
- (Russia) Eduard Metalnikov
- (Switzerland) Joris Müller
- (Sweden) Henrik Pihlblad
- (Finland) Joonas Saha
- (Slovakia) Peter Šefčík
- (Czech Republic) Rudolf Tosenovjan

== Format ==
A change in format was implemented for the Top Division. The four best ranked teams from each group of the preliminary round advanced to the quarterfinals, while the last placed teams from each group played a relegation round in a best of three format to determine the relegated team. This format was last used in 2002, except the current tournament will not incorporate playoff games to determine places five through eight.

== Player eligibility ==
A player is eligible to play in the 2014 World Junior Ice Hockey Championships if:

- the player is of male gender;
- the player was born at the earliest in 1994, and at the latest, in 1999;
- the player is a citizen in the country he represents;
- the player is under the jurisdiction of a national association that is a member of the IIHF.

If a player who has never played in IIHF-organized competition wishes to switch national eligibility, he must have played in competitions for two consecutive years in the new country without playing in another country, as well as show his move to the new country's national association with an international transfer card. In case the player has previously played in IIHF-organized competition but wishes to switch national eligibility, he must have played in competitions for four consecutive years in the new country without playing in another country, he must show his move to the new country's national association with an international transfer card, as well as be a citizen of the new country. A player may only switch national eligibility once.

== Top Division ==
=== Preliminary round ===
All times are local (Central European Time – UTC+1).

==== Group A ====
Pos	Team	Pld	W	OTW	OTL	L	GF	GA	GD	Pts	Qualification
1	Canada	4	3	0	1	0	19	12	+7	10	Quarterfinals
2	United States	4	3	0	0	1	21	7	+14	9	Quarterfinals
3	Czech Republic	4	1	1	0	2	9	13	−4	5	Quarterfinals
4	Slovakia	4	1	0	0	3	16	16	0	3	Quarterfinals
5	Germany	4	1	0	0	3	7	24	−17	3	Relegation round

Source: IIHF

26 December 2013; 13:30	Germany	2–7 (2–4, 0–2, 0–1)	Canada	Malmö Isstadion; Attendance: 1,861

Game reference

Marvin Cupper
Goalies
Jake Paterson
Referees:
(Czech Republic) Rene Hradil
(Slovakia) Jozef Kubus
Linesmen:
(Slovakia) Peter Šefčík
(Czech Republic) Rudolf Tosenovjan

D. Saeftel (L. Palausch, P. Klopper) – 01:35	1–0
	1–1	06:21 – J. Anderson (F. Gauthier, M. Dumba)
	1–2	10:41 – A. Mantha (C. Lazar, J. Drouin) (PP)
J. Moser (D. Kahun) (PP) – 15:59	2–2
	2–3	17:36 – A. Mantha (D. Pouliot, J. Drouin)
	2–4	18:29 – B. Horvat (S. Reinhart)
	2–5	26:45 – S. Reinhart (J. Morrissey, C. McDavid)
	2–6	31:28 – A. Mantha (J. Drouin, D. Pouliot) (PP)
	2–7	50:13 – N. Petan (C. McDavid)

10 min
Penalties
6 min
24
Shots
30

26 December 2013; 17:30	Czech Republic	1–5 (0–2, 0–2, 1–1)	United States	Malmö Isstadion; Attendance: 1,321

Game reference

Daniel Dolejs
Goalies
Jon Gillies
Referees:
(Switzerland) Daniel Stricker
(Switzerland) Marc Wiegand
Linesmen:
(Germany) Andreas Kowert
(Switzerland) Joris Müller

	0–1	01:21 – R. Barber (M. Grzelcyk, N. Kerdiles) (PP)
	0–2	02:02 – W. Butcher (J. Eichel, R. Hartman) (PP)
	0–3	29:23 – H. Fasching (A. Copp)
	0–4	37:03 – J. Slavin (Z. Stepan, Q. Shore)
M. Plutnar (D. Kämpf, O. Kaše) (PP) – 45:47	1–4
	1–5	57:49 – V. Hinostroza (T. DiPauli, C. Carrick)

8 min
Penalties
6 min
24
Shots
33

27 December 2013; 15:00	Slovakia	9–2 (3–0, 3–1, 3–1)	Germany	Malmö Isstadion; Attendance: 533

Game reference

Richard Sabol
Goalies
Marvin Cupper
Referees:
(Finland) Antti Boman
(Denmark) Jacob Grumsen
Linesmen:
(Japan) Kenji Kosaka
(Russia) Eduard Metalnikov

M. Kolena (D. Gríger, M. Réway) (PP) – 03:33	1–0
M. Daňo (M. Lunter) – 12:38	2–0
D. Gríger (M. Kolena, M. Réway) (PP) – 17:24	3–0
M. Daňo (P. Cehlárik) – 21:57	4–0
	4–1	22:38 – D. Kahun (L. Draisaitl)
M. Kolena (M. Réway, D. Gríger) – 26:31	5–1
D. Gachulinec (S. Horanský, F. Mlynčár) – 30:38	6–1
	6–2	45:56 – J. Moser (L. Draisaitl, D. Kahun)
M. Réway (D. Gríger) – 47:44	7–2
M. Lunter (M. Daňo, P. Cehlárik) – 48:24	8–2
S. Horanský (M. Valjent) – 57:30	9–2

6 min
Penalties
4 min
28
Shots
21

28 December 2013; 13:30	United States	6–3 (2–0, 1–2, 3–1)	Slovakia	Malmö Isstadion; Attendance: 1,658

Game reference

Jon Gillies
Goalies
Richard Sabol
Referees:
(Canada) Steve Papp
(Russia) Evgeniy Romasko
Linesmen:
(Germany) Andreas Kowert
(Finland) Joonas Saha

J. Eichel (R. Hartman, W. Butcher (PP) – 16:53	1–0
D. O'Regan (M. Grzelcyk, N. Kerdiles) (PP) – 19:59	2–0
R. Hartman (W. Butcher, J. Eichel) (PP) – 24:22	3–0
	3–1	31:04 – M. Kolena (P. Cehlárik) (PP)
	3–2	32:57 – M. Réway (D. Gríger, M. Kolena) (PP)
M. Grzelcyk (C. Carrick, T. DiPauli) – 49:33	4–2
S. Matteau (A. Copp, H. Fasching) – 54:15	5–2
R. Barber (A. Copp, N. Kerdiles) – 56:34	6–2
	6–3	57:52 – M. Réway (D. Gríger, D. Gachulinec)

12 min
Penalties
10 min
47
Shots
30

28 December 2013; 17:30	Canada	4–5 GWS (1–1, 0–1, 3–2) (OT: 0–0) (SO: 1–2)	Czech Republic	Malmö Isstadion; Attendance: 3,011

Game reference

Jake Paterson
Goalies
Marek Langhamer
Referees:
(Denmark) Jacob Grumsen
(United States) Timothy Mayer
Linesmen:
(Russia) Eduard Metalnikov
(Sweden) Henrik Pihlblad

	0–1	07:10 – D. Kämpf (O. Kaše)
S. Reinhart (B. Horvat, C. McDavid) (PP) – 15:50	1–1
	1–2	37:16 – M. Plutnar
J. Drouin (S. Reinhart, A. Mantha) (PP) – 40:24	2–2
	2–3	44:07 – V. Tomeček
A. Ekblad (S. Laughton, C. Lazar) (SH) – 51:09	3–3
	3–4	52:45 – J. Vrána (PP)
C. Hudon (A. Mantha, J. Drouin) – 53:01	4–4

J. Drouin
N. Petan (miss)
C. McDavid (miss)
Shootout
(miss) O. Kaše
D. Pastrňák
D. Simon
12 min
Penalties
12 min
29
Shots
29

29 December 2013; 15:00	Germany	0–8 (0–2, 0–4, 0–2)	United States	Malmö Isstadion; Attendance: 651

Game reference

Patrick Klein
Kevin Reich
Goalies
Anthony Stolarz
Referees:
(Sweden) Marcus Linde
(Canada) Devin Piccott
Linesmen:
(Finland) Joonas Saha
(Czech Republic) Rudolf Tosenovjan

0–1	08:09 – H. Fasching (A. Copp, T. DiPauli)
0–2	11:56 – N. Kerdiles (V. Hinostroza) (PP)
0–3	22:21 – W. Butcher (J. Eichel, A. Erne) (PP2)
0–4	23:27 – V. Hinostroza (A. Copp, C. Carrick) (PP)
0–5	31:46 – R. Barber (M. Grzelcyk, Z. Stepan) (PP)
0–6	33:57 – M. Grzelcyk (R. Barber, V. Hinostroza) (PP2)
0–7	50:04 – S. Santini (M. Grzelcyk, N. Kerdiles) (PP)
0–8	53:46 – V. Hinostroza (Q. Shore)

45 min
Penalties
8 min
15
Shots
53

30 December 2013; 13:30	Czech Republic	0–3 (0–1, 0–2, 0-0)	Germany	Malmö Isstadion; Attendance: 1,062

Game reference

Marek Langhamer
Goalies
Marvin Cupper
Referees:
(Sweden) Tobias Björk
(Canada) Steve Papp
Linesmen:
(Russia) Eduard Metalnikov
(Sweden) Henrik Pilhblad

0–1	14:25 – F. Tiffels (J. Moser, D. Kahun)
0–2	35:24 – D. Kahun (F. Tiffels)
0–3	37:51 – F. Tiffels (T. Bender) (PP)

12 min
Penalties
8 min
40
Shots
34

30 December 2013; 17:30	Canada	5–3 (1–1, 1–2, 3–0)	Slovakia	Malmö Isstadion; Attendance: 2,558

Game reference

Zachary Fucale
Goalies
Samuel Baroš
Referees:
(Czech Republic) Rene Hradil
(Russia) Evgeniy Romasko
Linesmen:
(Japan) Kenji Kosaka
(Germany) Andreas Kowert

	0–1	01:40 – D. Gríger (J. Predajnianský, M. Réway) (PP)
C. Lazar (A. Mantha, N. Petan) (PP) – 18:12	1–1
	1–2	27:07 – M. Réway (D. Gríger, M. Kolena) (PP2)
	1–3	32:33 - D. Gríger (M. Réway, M. Kolena) (PP)
A. Mantha (A. Ekblad, J. Drouin) – 37:00	2–3
J. Drouin (A. Mantha) – 54:02	3–3
N. Petan (A. Mantha, D. Pouliot) (PP) – 57:14	4–3
N. Petan (S. Reinhart, C. Lazar) (EN) – 58:39	5–3

22 min
Penalties
10 min
49
Shots
22

31 December 2013; 13:30	Slovakia	1–4 (0–2, 1–2, 0–0)	Czech Republic	Malmö Isstadion; Attendance: 1,259

Game reference

Samuel Baroš
Richard Sabol
Goalies
Marek Langhamer
Referees:
(Finland) Antti Boman
(Sweden) Marcus Linde
Linesmen:
(Sweden) Henrik Pilhblad
(Finland) Joonas Saha

	0–1	00:18 – D. Pastrňák (M. Procházka)
	0–2	03:54 – O. Kaše (J. Košťálek)
	0–3	22:00 – M. Procházka (D. Simon)
	0–4	26:46 – P. Šidlík (M. Procházka, D. Pastrňák) (PP)
M. Kolena (D. Gríger, M. Réway) – 39:56	1–4

10 min
Penalties
33 min
32
Shots
28

31 December 2013; 17:30	United States	2–3 (0–0, 1–1, 1–2)	Canada	Malmö Isstadion; Attendance: 3,882

Game reference

Jon Gillies
Goalies
Zachary Fucale
Referees:
(Sweden) Tobias Björk
(Switzerland) Daniel Stricker
Linesmen:
(Germany) Andreas Kowert
(Russia) Eduard Metalnikov

R. Barber (J. Slavin, N. Kerdiles) (SH) – 23:29	1–0
	1–1	32:19 – N. Petan (A. Mantha)
	1–2	43:54 – C. McDavid (B. Horvat, J. Morrissey)
	1–3	46:13 – C. Lazar (J. Drouin) (PP)
S. Matteau (H. Fasching, W. Butcher) – 57:15	2–3

10 min
Penalties
6 min
26
Shots
24

==== Group B ====
Pos	Team	Pld	W	OTW	OTL	L	GF	GA	GD	Pts	Qualification
1	Sweden	4	4	0	0	0	22	7	+15	12	Quarterfinals
2	Finland	4	2	0	1	1	14	10	+4	7	Quarterfinals
3	Russia	4	2	0	0	2	21	8	+13	6	Quarterfinals
4	Switzerland	4	1	1	0	2	11	17	−6	5	Quarterfinals
5	Norway	4	0	0	0	4	3	29	−26	0	Relegation round

Source: IIHF

26 December 2013; 15:00	Norway	0–11 (0–5, 0–5, 0–1)	Russia	Malmö Arena; Attendance: 4,260

Game reference

Henrik Haukeland
Joachim Svendsen
Goalies
Andrei Vasilevski
Ivan Nalimov
Referees:
(Canada) Steve Papp
(Canada) Devin Piccott
Linesmen:
(Sweden) Henrik Pihlblad
(Finland) Joonas Saha

0–1	05:04 – V. Osnovin (D. Zhafyarov, A. Barabanov)
0–2	06:26 – N. Zadorov (P. Buchnevich, M. Grigorenko)
0–3	06:37 – D. Zhafyarov (V. Osnovin, A. Bereglazov)
0–4	13:35 – V. Khlopotov (I. Barbashev, A. Mironov)
0–5	15:03 – M. Grigorenko (I. Lyubushkin, P. Buchnevish)
0–6	26:57 – V. Khlopotov (B. Yakimov)
0–7	29:20 – N. Tryamkin
0–8	31:03 – A. Slepyshev (M. Grigorenko) (PP)
0–9	37:18 – N. Zadorov (SH)
0–10	38:25 – A. Barabanov (N. Tryamkin, D. Zhafyarov) (PP)
0–11	48:02 – A. Slepyshev (I. Lyubushkin)

18 min
Penalties
8 min
14
Shots
35

26 December 2013; 19:00	Switzerland	3–5 (2–3, 0–0, 1–2)	Sweden	Malmö Arena; Attendance: 11,109

Game reference

Melvin Nyffeler
Goalies
Oscar Dansk
Referees:
(United States) Timothy Mayer
(Russia) Evgeniy Romasko
Linesmen:
(Canada) Benoît Martineau
(United States) Fraser McIntyre

S. Zangger (J. Fuchs) (PP) – 05:43	1–0
	1–1	06:54 – F. Forsberg (J. de la Rose)
K. Fiala (V. Praplan) – 08:23	2–1
	2–2	08:44 – L. Bengtsson (E. Karlsson)
	2–3	17:19 – O. Sundqvist (F. Forsberg, J. de la Rose)
F. Herzog (S. Zangger) (PP) – 41:01	3–3
	3–4	42:43 – C. Djoos (A. Burakovsky, F. Forsberg) (PP)
	3–5	57:12 – A. Johnson (A. Wennberg)

12 min
Penalties
12 min
33
Shots
36

27 December 2013; 17:30	Finland	5–1 (1–0, 3–0, 1–1)	Norway	Malmö Arena; Attendance: 734

Game reference

Juuse Saros
Goalies
Joachim Svendsen
Referees:
(Sweden) Tobias Björk
(Sweden) Marcus Linde
Linesmen:
(Switzerland) Joris Müller
(Czech Republic) Rudolf Tosenovjan

A. Lehkonen (S. Mäenalanen) (PP) – 19:13	1–0
S. Mäenalanen (T. Teräväinen, A. Lehkonen) – 22:57	2–0
S. Mäenalanen (V. Pokka) – 34:19	3–0
J. Nikko (R. Kulmala) – 35:18	4–0
V. Leskinen (O. Rauhala) – 47:40	5–0
	5–1	56:52 – T. Johnsgard (C. Rasch, J. Tonjum)

14 min
Penalties
8 min
48
Shots
29

28 December 2013; 15:00	Sweden	4–2 (1–1, 2–0, 1–1)	Finland	Malmö Arena; Attendance: 11,604

Game reference

Oscar Dansk
Goalies
Ville Husso
Referees:
(Czech Republic) Rene Hradil
(Switzerland) Daniel Stricker
Linesmen:
(United States) Fraser McIntyre
(Slovakia) Peter Šefčík

	0–1	00:41 – E. Lindell (T. Teräväinen)
A. Wennberg (L. Wallmark, A. Johnson) (PP2) – 04:15	1–1
A. Johnson (A. Wennberg, S. Collberg) – 34:04	2–1
J. de la Rose (F. Forsberg) – 36:19	3–1
	3–2	40:45 – R. Ristolainen (T. Teräväinen)
A. Wennberg (A. Johnson) – 47:27	4–2

16 min
Penalties
20 min
30
Shots
20

28 December 2013; 19:00	Russia	7–1 (2–1, 3–0, 2–0)	Switzerland	Malmö Arena; Attendance: 7,543

Game reference

Andrei Vasilevski
Goalies
Sascha Rochow
Referees:
(Sweden) Tobias Björk
(Slovakia) Jozef Kubus
Linesmen:
(Japan) Kenji Kosaka
(Canada) Benoît Martineau

	0–1	15:02 – J. Fuchs
I. Barbashyov – 16:27	1–1
A. Mironov (A. Slepyshev) (PP) – 17:31	2–1
B. Yakimov (A. Bereglazov, A. Vailevski) (PP) – 26:23	3–1
A. Barabanov (I. Lyubushkin) – 31:27	4–1
D. Zhafyarov (A. Barabanov, Nikita Tryamkin) – 32:01	5–1
V. Osnovin (D. Zhafyarov) (PP) – 48:17	6-1
M. Grigorenko (P. Buchnevich, N. Zadorov) (PP2) – 49:52	7–1

6 min
Penalties
34 min
34
Shots
26

29 December 2013; 17:30	Norway	0–10 (0–3, 0–3, 0–4)	Sweden	Malmö Arena; Attendance: 11,296

Game reference

Henrik Haukeland
Goalies
Marcus Högberg
Referees:
(Finland) Antti Boman
(Switzerland) Marc Wiegand
Linesmen:
(United States) Fraser McIntyre
(Slovakia) Peter Šefčík

0–1	03:26 – S. Collberg (A. Johnson, A. Wennberg
0–2	08:55 – A. Burakovsky (J. de la Rose, E. Lindholm) (PP)
0–3	15:42 – A. Burakovsky (G. Olofsson, F. Forsberg (PP)
0–4	21:16 – R. Hägg (N. Sörensen, L. Wallmark)
0–5	25:01 – A. Burakovsky (N. Sörensen)
0–6	29:42 – S. Collberg (F. Forsberg, E. Lindholm)
0–7	43:40 – R. Norell (S. Collberg, A. Wennberg)
0–8	46:31 – A. Wennberg (S. Collberg)
0–9	51:51 – E. Lindholm (F. Forsberg, G. Olofsson) (PP)
0–10	57:37 – N. Sörensen (E. Karlsson, L. Bengtsson) (PP)

16 min
Penalties
12 min
13
Shots
45

30 December 2013; 15:00	Russia	1–4 (1–0, 0–3, 0–1)	Finland	Malmö Arena; Attendance: 945

Game reference

Ivan Nalimov
Goalies
Juuse Saros
Referees:
(Slovakia) Jozef Kubus
(Switzerland) Daniel Stricker
Linesmen:
(Canada) Benoît Martineau
(Switzerland) Joris Müller

V. Vasilyev (P. Buchnevich, M. Grigorenko) – 05:27	1–0
	1–1	22:21 – S. Mäenalanen (V. Pokka, T. Teräväinen) (PP)
	1–2	30:20 – H. Haapala (T. Teräväinen, E. Lindell)
	1–3	35:07 – R. Kulmala (J. Ikonen, S. Kinnunen)
	1–4	47:39 – J. Nikko (J. Ikonen, A. Mustonen) (PP)

10 min
Penalties
8 min
29
Shots
31

30 December 2013; 19:00	Switzerland	3–2 (0–1, 1–0, 2–1)	Norway	Malmö Arena; Attendance: 418

Game reference

Melvin Nyffeler
Goalies
Joachim Svendsen
Referees:
(United States) Timothy Mayer
(Canada) Devin Piccott
Linesmen:
(Slovakia) Peter Šefčík
(Czech Republic) Rudolf Tosenovjan

	0–1	09:27 – E. Lesund
F. Herzog (K. Fiala) (PP2) – 34:39	1–1
M. Müller (S. Zangger) – 46:17	2–1
	2–2	49:00 – C. Rasch (J. Tonjum, E. Lesund) (PP)
A. Rouiller (K. Fiala) (PP) – 51:42	3–2

16 min
Penalties
14 min
38
Shots
26

31 December 2013; 14:00	Sweden	3–2 (2–0, 0–1, 1–1)	Russia	Malmö Arena; Attendance: 11,528

Game reference

Oscar Dansk
Goalies
Andrei Vasilevski
Referees:
(United States) Timothy Mayer
(Switzerland) Marc Wiegand
Linesmen:
(United States) Fraser McIntyre
(Switzerland) Joris Müller

A. Johnson (S. Collberg, L. Wallmark) (PP) – 03:29	1–0
N. Sörensen (L. Wallmark, A. Burakovsky) – 17:01	2–0
	2–1	24:47 – A. Barabanov (V. Osnovin, I. Lyubushkin) (PP)
	2–2	51:52 – M. Grigorenko (P. Buchnevich, A. Slepyshev)
J. de la Rose (G. Olofsson, E. Lindholm) – 57:38	3–2

6 min
Penalties
20 min
32
Shots
35

31 December 2013; 18:00	Finland	3–4 GWS (1–1, 1–2, 1–0) (OT: 0–0) (SO: 0–1)	Switzerland	Malmö Arena; Attendance: 718

Game reference

Ville Husso
Juuse Saros
Goalies
Melvin Nyffeler
Referees:
(Denmark) Jacob Grumsen
(Canada) Steve Papp
Linesmen:
(Japan) Kenji Kosaka
(Canada) Benoît Martineau

	0–1	18:50 – F. Schmutz (K. Fiala)
V. Pokka (E. Lindell, T. Teräväinen) (PP) – 19:34	1–1
	1–2	26:56 – F. Herzog
	1–3	29:49 – N. Dunner (M. Müller)
A. Mustonen (H. Ikonen, J. Vainio) – 30:29	2–3
S. Mäenalanen (T. Teräväinen, H. Haapala) – 40:35	3–3

A. Mustonen (miss)
S. Mäenalanen (miss)
T. Teräväinen (miss)
T. Teräväinen (miss)
E. Lindell (miss)
J. Ikonen (miss)
Shootout
(miss) S. Zangger
(miss) F. Herzog
(miss) K. Fiala
(miss) V. Praplan
(miss) J. Fuchs
C. Paschoud
10 min
Penalties
14 min
40
Shots
34

=== Relegation round ===
The relegation round was a best-of-three series. Norway lost two games and were relegated to the 2015 Division I A.

All times are local (Central European Time – UTC+1).

January 2, 2014; 11:00	Germany	0–3 (0–0, 0–3, 0–0)	Norway	Malmö Arena; Attendance: 294

Game reference

Marvin Cupper
Goalies
Joachim Svendsen
Referees:
(Czech Republic) Rene Hradil
(Canada) Steve Papp
Linesmen:
(Canada) Benoît Martineau
(Russia) Eduard Metalnikov

0–1	25:06 – M. Rønnild (L. Hoff, J. Karterud) (PP)
0–2	26:19 – D. Svendsen (S. Nielsen, M. Nilsen)
0–3	33:42 – A. Klavestad (E. Lesund, J. Karterud) (PP)

35 min
Penalties
4 min
29
Shots
24

January 3, 2014; 16:00	Norway	3–4 (1–2, 2–0, 0–2)	Germany	Malmö Isstadion; Attendance: 463

Game reference

Joachim Svendsen
Goalies
Marvin Cupper
Referees:
(Finland) Antti Boman
(Switzerland) Daniel Stricker
Linesmen:
(United States) Fraser McIntyre
(Finland) Joonas Saha

J. Karterud (L. Hoff, M. Søberg) – 03:32	1–0
	1–1	05:35 – S. Ziegler (M. Kammerer, F. Wagner)
	1–2	07:50 – L. Draisaitl (D. Kahun)
S. Nielsen (D. Svendsen, M. Nilsen) – 23:58	2–2
T-R. Johnsgård (J. H. Tönjum) (PP) – 34:48	3–2
	3–3	46:25 – M. Eisenschmid (P. Klöpper)
	3–4	47:41 – L. Draisaitl

12 min
Penalties
31 min
32
Shots
41

January 5, 2014; 12:00	Germany	3–1 (1–0, 1–0, 1–1)	Norway	Malmö Isstadion; Attendance: 157

Game reference

Marvin Cupper
Goalies
Joachim Svendsen
Referees:
(Slovakia) Jozef Kubus
(Sweden) Marcus Linde
Linesmen:
(Japan) Kenji Kosaka
(Finland) Joonas Saha

F. Tiffels (L. Draisaitl) – 19:46	1–0
D. Kahun (L. Draisaitl, F. Tiffels) – 39:20	2–0
P. Klöpper (V. Filin, F. Wagner) – 43:43	3–0
	3–1	54:25 – M. Fischer (A. Henriksen, S. Nielsen)

12 min
Penalties
10 min
26
Shots
35

=== Playoff round ===
Quarterfinals
1A	Canada	4
4B	Switzerland	1
2B	Finland	5
3A	Czech Republic	3
1B	Sweden	6
4A	Slovakia	0
2A	United States	3
3B	Russia	5

Semifinals
1A	Canada	1
2B	Finland	5
1B	Sweden	2
3B	Russia	1

Finals
2B	Finland (OT)	3
1B	Sweden	2
Bronze medal game
1A	Canada	1
3B	Russia	2

==== Quarterfinals ====
2 January 2014; 12:00	United States	3–5 (3–2, 0–2, 0–1)	Russia	Malmö Isstadion; Attendance: 1,876

Game reference

Jon Gillies
Goalies
Andrei Vasilevskiy
Referees:
(Slovakia) Jozef Kubus
(Sweden) Marcus Linde
Linesmen:
(Sweden) Henrik Pihlblad
(Finland) Joonas Saha

	0–1	06:17 – M. Grigorenko (A. Slepyshev)
S. Matteau (J. Eichel, B. Skjei) – 08:50	1–1
	1–2	09:11 – P. Buchnevich (A. Mironov)
R. Hartman (S. Matteau) – 11:23	2–2
N. Kerdiles (R. Barber) – 16:51	3–2
	3–3	33:15 – N. Zadorov (A. Slepyshev) (PP2)
	3–4	34:16 – N. Zadorov (A. Slepyshev) (PP2)
	3–5	59:32 – P. Buchnevich (ENG)

12 min
Penalties
30 min
33
Shots
25

2 January 2014; 14:30	Finland	5–3 (1–1, 1–2, 3–0)	Czech Republic	Malmö Arena; Attendance: 4,085

Game reference

Juuse Saros
Goalies
Marek Langhamer
Referees:
(Sweden) Tobias Björk
(Switzerland) Marc Wiegand
Linesmen:
(United States) Fraser McIntyre
(Switzerland) Joris Müller

S. Mäenalanen (T. Teräväinen, E. Lindell) – 2:54	1–0
	1–1	3:39 – D. Simon (M. Procházka, D. Pastrňák)
	1–2	31:07 – M. Procházka (J. Vrána, D. Simon)
	1–3	34:23 – R. Faksa (V. Tomeček, D. Volek)
J. Ikonen (R. Kulmala) – 38:05	2–3
H. Ikonen (M. Lehtonen) – 45:56	3–3
S. Kinnunen (R. Kulmala, J. Ikonen) – 51:39	4–3
S. Mäenalanen (T. Teräväinen) (ENG) – 59:45	5–3

4 min
Penalties
8 min
34
Shots
23

2 January 2014; 17:00	Canada	4–1 (1–0, 1–1, 2–0)	Switzerland	Malmö Isstadion; Attendance: 2,580

Game reference

Zachary Fucale
Goalies
Melvin Nyffeler
Referees:
(Denmark) Jacob Grumsen
(Russia) Evgeniy Romasko
Linesmen:
(Slovakia) Peter Šefčík
(Czech Republic) Rudolf Tosenovjan

G. Reinhart – 18:08	1–0
A. Mantha (PS) – 29:04	2–0
	2–1	39:59 – N. Dünner (M. Müller, K. Fiala)
C. Lazar (G. Reinhart) – 44:11	3–1
D. Pouliot – 53:49	4–1

10 min
Penalties
6 min
23
Shots
20

2 January 2014; 19:30	Sweden	6–0 (2–0, 2–0, 2–0)	Slovakia	Malmö Arena; Attendance: 10,857

Game reference

Oscar Dansk
Goalies
Richard Sabol
Referees:
(United States) Timothy Mayer
(Canada) Devin Piccott
Linesmen:
(Japan) Kenji Kosaka
(Germany) Andreas Kowert

L. Wallmark (N. Sörensen, L. Arnesson) – 11:58	1–0
E. Lindholm (F. Forsberg, G. Olofsson) (PP1) – 18:39	2–0
F. Forsberg (A. Burakovsky, E. Lindholm) (PP1) – 21:10	3–0
L. Wallmark (N. Sörensen, F. Forsberg) – 33:21	4–0
F. Forsberg (E. Lindholm) – 53:58	5–0
J. de la Rose (E. Lindholm, A. Burakovsky) (PP1) – 55:19	6–0

18 min
Penalties
22 min
40
Shots
18

==== Semifinals ====
4 January 2014; 15:00	Sweden	2–1 (1–0, 0–0, 1–1)	Russia	Malmö Arena; Attendance: 11,725

Game reference

Oscar Dansk
Goalies
Andrei Vasilevski
Referees:
(Finland) Antti Boman
(Czech Republic) Rene Hradil
Linesmen:
(Canada) Benoît Martineau
(Switzerland) Joris Müller

F. Forsberg (E. Lindholm) (PP1) – 19:11	1–0
O. Sundqvist (L. Arnesson, E. Karlsson) – 44:55	2–0
	2–1	46:37 – D. Zhafyarov (A. Barabanov)

14 min
Penalties
10 min
21
Shots
27

4 January 2014; 19:00	Canada	1–5 (0–0, 1–3, 0–2)	Finland	Malmö Arena; Attendance: 11,544

Game reference

Zachary Fucale
Goalies
Juuse Saros
Referees:
(United States) Timothy Mayer
(Switzerland) Marc Wiegand
Linesmen:
(Germany) Andreas Kowert
(Russia) Eduard Metalnikov

	0–1	24:19 – J. Nikko (J. Honka)
	0–2	26:10 – A. Lehkonen (S. Mäenalanen, T. Teräväinen) (PP1)
J. Drouin (C. Lazar) – 31:24	1–2
	1–3	35:36 – R. Ristolainen (M. Vainonen, H. Haapala)
	1–4	56:48 – T. Teräväinen (PS)
	1–5	59:11 – T. Teräväinen (S. Mäenalanen, V. Pokka) (ENG)

30 min
Penalties
10 min
24
Shots
23

==== Bronze medal game ====
5 January 2014; 15:00	Canada	1–2 (0–2, 0–0, 1–0)	Russia	Malmö Arena; Attendance: 10,713

Game reference

Zachary Fucale
Goalies
Andrei Vasilevski
Referees:
(Sweden) Tobias Björk
(United States) Timothy Mayer
Linesmen:
(Sweden) Henrik Pihlblad
(Czech Republic) Rudolf Tosenovjan

	0–1	03:35 – M. Grigorenko (PP1)
	0–2	14:38 – E. Gimatov (A. Mironov)
J. Morrissey (C. Hudon, A. Pelech) – 47:10	1–2

10 min
Penalties
10 min
31
Shots
32

==== Final ====
5 January 2014; 19:00	Sweden	2–3 OT (0–1, 1–1, 1–0) (OT: 0–1)	Finland	Malmö Arena; Attendance: 12,023

Game reference

Oscar Dansk
Goalies
Juuse Saros
Referees:
(Canada) Steve Papp
(Switzerland) Daniel Stricker
Linesmen:
(United States) Fraser McIntyre
(Slovakia) Peter Šefčík

	0–1	00:28 – E. Lindell (S. Mäenalanen, T. Teräväinen)
L. Wallmark (L. Bengtsson, C. Djoos) (PP1) – 27:53	1–1
	1–2	28:38 – S. Mäenalanen (T. Teräväinen, A. Lehkonen)
C. Djoos (L. Wallmark, S. Collberg) (PP1) – 50:53	2–2
	2–3	69:42 – R. Ristolainen (T. Teräväinen, M. Vainonen)

4 min
Penalties
12 min
37
Shots
31

=== Statistics ===
==== Scoring leaders ====
Pos	Player	Country	GP	G	A	Pts	+/−	PIM
1	Teuvo Teräväinen	Finland	7	2	13	15	+11	2
2	Filip Forsberg	Sweden	7	4	8	12	+3	2
3	Saku Mäenalanen	Finland	7	7	4	11	+9	0
4	Anthony Mantha	Canada	7	5	6	11	+6	0
5	Martin Réway	Slovakia	5	4	6	10	0	4
6	Dávid Gríger	Slovakia	5	3	7	10	+1	0
7	Jonathan Drouin	Canada	7	3	6	9	+5	24
8	Elias Lindholm	Sweden	6	2	7	9	−1	6
9	Mikhail Grigorenko	Russia	7	5	3	8	+6	0
10	Milan Kolena	Slovakia	5	4	4	8	−1	6

GP = Games played; G = Goals; A = Assists; Pts = Points; +/− = Plus–minus; PIM = Penalties In Minutes
Source: IIHF.com

==== Goaltending leaders ====
(minimum 40% team's total ice time)

Pos	Player	Country	TOI	GA	GAA	Sv%	SO
1	Juuse Saros	Finland	344:53	9	1.57	94.30	0
2	Andrei Vasilevski	Russia	327:50	10	1.83	93.33	0
3	Oscar Dansk	Sweden	369:42	11	1.79	92.86	1
4	Joachim Svendsen	Norway	318:01	16	3.02	91.53	1
5	Marek Langhamer	Czech Republic	243:47	12	2.95	90.62	0

TOI = Time on ice (minutes:seconds); GA = Goals against; GAA = Goals against average; Sv% = Save percentage; SO = Shutouts
Source: IIHF.com

=== Tournament awards ===
2014 IIHF World Junior Championship Winners
Finland
3rd title

Most Valuable Player

- Forward: (Sweden) Filip Forsberg

All-star team

- Goaltender: (Finland) Juuse Saros
- Defencemen: (Russia) Nikita Zadorov, (Finland) Rasmus Ristolainen
- Forwards: (Canada) Anthony Mantha, (Finland) Teuvo Teräväinen, (Sweden) Filip Forsberg

IIHF best player awards

- Goaltender: (Sweden) Oscar Dansk
- Defenceman: (Finland) Rasmus Ristolainen
- Forward: (Sweden) Filip Forsberg

=== Final standings ===
Rank	Team
1st place, gold medalist(s)	Finland
2nd place, silver medalist(s)	Sweden
3rd place, bronze medalist(s)	Russia
4th	Canada
5th	United States
6th	Czech Republic
7th	Switzerland
8th	Slovakia
9th	Germany
10th	Norway

Relegated to the 2015 Division I A

Note that due to the lack of playoff games for determining the spots 5–8, these spots were determined by the regulation round records for each team.

=== Medalists ===
Gold:	Silver:	Bronze:
Finland #1 – Janne Juvonen #4 – Mikko Lehtonen #5 – Rasmus Ristolainen #7 – Esa Lindell #8 – Saku Mäenalanen #9 – Julius Honka #10 – Juuso Ikonen #11 – Joni Nikko #12 – Ville Pokka #13 – Ville-Valtteri Leskinen #14 – Topi Nättinen #15 – Juuso Vainio #18 – Saku Kinnunen #19 – Mikko Vainonen #20 – Teuvo Teräväinen #21 – Aleksi Mustonen #22 – Henri Ikonen #25 – Henrik Haapala #26 – Rasmus Kulmala #28 – Artturi Lehkonen #29 – Otto Rauhala #30 – Ville Husso #31 – Juuse Saros	Sweden #1 – Marcus Högberg #3 – Robin Norell #4 – Christian Djoos #5 – Andreas Johnson #6 – Jesper Pettersson #8 – Linus Arnesson #9 – Jacob de la Rose #10 – Alexander Wennberg #13 – Gustav Olofsson #14 – Robert Hägg #15 – Sebastian Collberg #16 – Filip Forsberg #18 – André Burakovsky #19 – Elias Lindholm #20 – Lukas Bengtsson #21 – Filip Sandberg #23 – Nick Sörensen #26 – Erik Karlsson #27 – Anton Karlsson #28 – Lucas Wallmark #29 – Oskar Sundqvist #30 – Jonas Johansson #35 – Oscar Dansk	Russia #1 – Igor Ustinski #4 – Ilya Lyubushkin #5 – Alexei Bereglazov #6 – Valeri Vasilyev #7 – Kirill Maslov #8 – Nikita Tryamkin #9 – Anton Slepyshev #10 – Bogdan Yakimov #11 – Damir Zhafyarov #12 – Ivan Barbashev #14 – Nikolai Skladnichenko #15 – Georgi Busarov #16 – Nikita Zadorov #17 – Eduard Gimatov #18 – Vyacheslav Osnovin #19 – Pavel Buchnevich #20 – Ivan Nalimov #21 – Alexander Barabanov #22 – Andrei Mironov #23 – Valentin Zykov #25 – Mikhail Grigorenko #27 – Vadim Khlopotov #30 – Andrei Vasilevski

Source: 1 2 3

== Division I ==
=== Division I A ===
The Division I A tournament was played in Sanok, Poland, from 15 to 21 December 2013.

Pos	Team	Pld	W	OTW	OTL	L	GF	GA	GD	Pts	Promotion or relegation
1	Denmark	5	5	0	0	0	20	10	+10	15	Promoted to the 2015 Top Division
2	Latvia	5	4	0	0	1	23	7	+16	12	
3	Belarus	5	3	0	0	2	23	14	+9	9	
4	Austria	5	2	0	0	3	10	14	−4	6	
5	Slovenia	5	0	1	0	4	11	28	−17	2	
6	Poland (H)	5	0	0	1	4	6	20	−14	1	Relegated to the 2015 Division I B

Source: IIHF
(H) Host

=== Division I B ===
The Division I B tournament was played in Dumfries, Great Britain, from 9 to 15 December 2013.

Pos	Team	Pld	W	OTW	OTL	L	GF	GA	GD	Pts	Promotion or relegation
1	Italy	5	3	2	0	0	20	14	+6	13	Promoted to the 2015 Division I A
2	Kazakhstan	5	4	0	0	1	28	16	+12	12	
3	France	5	2	0	2	1	15	16	−1	8	
4	Ukraine	5	2	0	0	3	11	15	−4	6	
5	Japan	5	0	0	0	5	17	23	−6	0	
6	Great Britain (Note: Great Britain were disqualified due to use of an ineligible player and were relegated to the 2015 Division II A.) (D, H)	5	1	1	1	2	13	20	−7	6	Relegated to the 2015 Division II A

Source: IIHF
(D) Disqualified; (H) Host

== Division II ==
=== Division II A ===
The Division II A tournament was played in Miskolc, Hungary, from 15 to 21 December 2013.

Pos	Team	Pld	W	OTW	OTL	L	GF	GA	GD	Pts	Promotion or relegation
1	Hungary (H)	5	5	0	0	0	34	7	+27	15	Promoted to the 2015 Division I B
2	Lithuania	5	3	1	0	1	21	14	+7	11	
3	Netherlands	5	3	0	1	1	22	18	+4	10	
4	Estonia	5	2	0	0	3	11	19	−8	6	
5	Romania	5	1	0	0	4	8	20	−12	3	
6	Croatia	5	0	0	0	5	8	26	−18	0	Relegated to the 2015 Division II B

Source: IIHF
(H) Host

=== Division II B ===
The Division II B tournament was played in Jaca, Spain, from 11 to 17 January 2014.

Pos	Team	Pld	W	OTW	OTL	L	GF	GA	GD	Pts	Promotion or relegation
1	South Korea	5	5	0	0	0	41	12	+29	15	Promoted to the 2015 Division II A
2	Spain (H)	5	4	0	0	1	19	11	+8	12	
3	Serbia	5	3	0	0	2	15	15	0	9	
4	Australia	5	1	1	0	3	12	19	−7	5	
5	Iceland	5	1	0	1	3	20	19	+1	4	
6	China	5	0	0	0	5	9	40	−31	0	Relegated to the 2015 Division III

Source: IIHF
(H) Host

== Division III ==
The Division III tournament was played in İzmir, Turkey, from 12 to 18 January 2014.

Pos	Team	Pld	W	OTW	OTL	L	GF	GA	GD	Pts	Promotion
1	Belgium	5	5	0	0	0	37	3	+34	15	Promoted to the 2015 Division II B
2	New Zealand	5	4	0	0	1	29	6	+23	12	
3	Mexico	5	2	1	0	2	16	11	+5	8	
4	Turkey (H)	5	2	0	1	2	10	24	−14	7	
5	South Africa	5	0	1	0	4	7	26	−19	2	
6	Bulgaria	5	0	0	1	4	4	33	−29	1	

Source: IIHF
(H) Host
