= Alexander Barabanov =

Russian ice hockey player (born 1994)

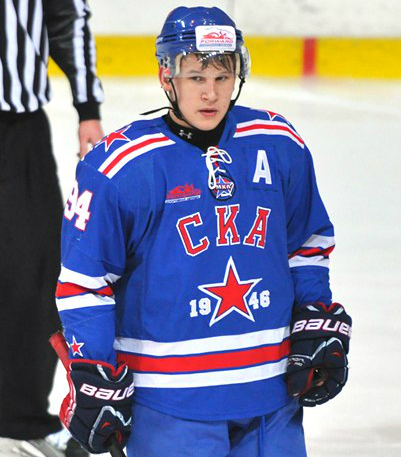
- Barabanov with SKA-1946 in 2013
- Born: 17 June 1994 (age 32) Saint Petersburg, Russia
- Height: 5 ft 10 in (178 cm)
- Weight: 195 lb (88 kg; 13 st 13 lb)
- Position: Right wing
- Shoots: Left
- KHL team Former teams: Avtomobilist Yekaterinburg; SKA Saint Petersburg; Toronto Maple Leafs; San Jose Sharks; Ak Bars Kazan
- National team: Russia
- NHL draft: Undrafted
- Playing career: 2013–present

Alexander Dmitriyevich Barabanov (Russian: Александр Дмитриевич Барабанов) (born 17 June 1994) is a Russian professional ice hockey player who is currently playing with Avtomobilist Yekaterinburg in the Kontinental Hockey League (KHL). He formerly played in the National Hockey League (NHL) for the Toronto Maple Leafs and the San Jose Sharks.

== Playing career ==
Barabanov made his Kontinental Hockey League (KHL) debut playing with powerhouse SKA Saint Petersburg during the 2013–14 KHL season. Barabanov won the Gagarin Cup with Saint Petersburg in 2015 and 2017. He was named a KHL All-Star in the 2018–19 KHL season. On 7 April 2020, Barabanov having played seven seasons in the KHL with Saint Petersburg, opted to pursue a career in the National Hockey League (NHL) by signing a one-year entry-level contract with the Toronto Maple Leafs.

In the pandemic-delayed 2020–21 season, Barabanov remained on the Maple Leafs opening night roster and made his NHL debut in a 5–4 overtime win over the Montreal Canadiens on 13 January 2021. Playing in a reduced role, due to the Maple Leafs forward depth, Barabanov appeared sporadically in 13 regular season games collecting one point, a primary assist on a T. J. Brodie goal in a 3–2 victory also over the Canadiens, on 7 April 2021. In an assignment to the Maple Leafs American Hockey League (AHL) affiliate, the Toronto Marlies, Barabanov showed his offensive acumen in collecting five points through two games.

On 12 April 2021, Barabanov was traded from Toronto at the trade deadline to the San Jose Sharks in exchange for Antti Suomela. He made his debut with the Sharks on 26 April 2021, in a 6–4 win over the Arizona Coyotes, in which he scored his first NHL goal. On 12 May 2021, he signed a one-year extension. During the 2021–22 season, Barabanov played in 70 games, scoring ten goals and 29 points. In the 2022 offseason, he re-signed with San Jose to a two-year, $5 million contract extension. During the 2022–23 season, Barabanov improved, scoring 15 goals and 47 points in 68 games before being missing the remainder of the season due to injury. Barabanov struggled with injuries in the 2023–24 season, appearing in only 46 games, scoring four goals and 13 points.

Following four seasons in the NHL, on 1 August 2024, Barabanov opted to return to his homeland to continue his career, signing a two-year contract with Ak Bars Kazan of the KHL.

At the conclusion of his contract with Ak Bars, Barabanov continued his career in the KHL signing as a free agent to a two-year contract with Avtomobilist Yekaterinburg on 16 July 2026.

== International play ==
Medal record

Men's ice hockey

Representing Olympic Athletes from Russia

Olympic Games
Gold medal – first place	2018 Pyeongchang	Team

Representing Russia

World Championships
Bronze medal – third place	2017 Germany/France	
Bronze medal – third place	2019 Slovakia	

World Junior Championships
Bronze medal – third place	2014 Malmö	

Barabanov played for Russia at the 2014 World Junior Championships earning a bronze medal. He played for the senior Russian national team at the IIHF World Championships in 2017, 2018, 2019 and 2021, winning bronze 2017 and 2019. He was a member of the Olympic Athletes from Russia team at the 2018 Winter Olympics, winning a gold medal.

== Career statistics ==
=== Regular season and playoffs ===
			Regular season					Playoffs
Season	Team	League	GP	G	A	Pts	PIM	GP	G	A	Pts	PIM
2010–11	SKA-1946 St. Petersburg	MHL	29	6	4	10	10	—	—	—	—	—
2011–12	SKA-1946 St. Petersburg	MHL	48	18	21	39	16	5	2	0	2	0
2012–13	SKA-1946 St. Petersburg	MHL	64	39	42	81	14	7	5	2	7	27
2012–13	HK VMF St. Petersburg	VHL	1	0	0	0	0	—	—	—	—	—
2013–14	SKA-1946 St. Petersburg	MHL	20	18	12	40	4	6	3	1	4	0
2013–14	SKA Saint Petersburg	KHL	5	1	0	1	2	4	1	0	1	0
2013–14	HK VMF-Kareliya St. Petersburg	VHL	21	7	3	10	8	—	—	—	—	—
2014–15	SKA-1946 St. Petersburg	MHL	21	16	15	31	6	15	9	8	17	2
2014–15	SKA Saint Petersburg	KHL	15	4	2	6	0	1	0	0	0	0
2014–15	SKA-Kareliya St. Petersburg	VHL	13	1	2	3	6	—	—	—	—	—
2015–16	SKA Saint Petersburg	KHL	40	6	11	17	48	14	1	3	4	4
2015–16	SKA-Neva St. Petersburg	VHL	10	10	3	13	0	—	—	—	—	—
2016–17	SKA Saint Petersburg	KHL	55	13	12	25	10	17	2	2	4	2
2017–18	SKA Saint Petersburg	KHL	46	10	12	22	4	13	3	3	6	6
2018–19	SKA Saint Petersburg	KHL	58	17	29	46	12	15	3	2	5	2
2019–20	SKA Saint Petersburg	KHL	49	11	9	20	22	4	1	2	3	2
2020–21	Toronto Maple Leafs	NHL	13	0	1	1	4	—	—	—	—	—
2020–21	Toronto Marlies	AHL	2	2	3	5	0	—	—	—	—	—
2020–21	San Jose Barracuda	AHL	2	0	0	0	0	—	—	—	—	—
2020–21	San Jose Sharks	NHL	9	3	4	7	2	—	—	—	—	—
2021–22	San Jose Sharks	NHL	70	10	29	39	14	—	—	—	—	—
2022–23	San Jose Sharks	NHL	68	15	32	47	20	—	—	—	—	—
2023–24	San Jose Sharks	NHL	46	4	9	13	12	—	—	—	—	—
2024–25	Ak Bars Kazan	KHL	67	25	33	58	26	13	5	3	8	2
2025–26	Ak Bars Kazan	KHL	64	21	30	51	16	20	6	10	16	4
KHL totals			393	108	138	246	122	101	22	25	47	22
NHL totals			206	32	75	107	52	—	—	—	—	—

=== International ===
Year	Team	Event	Result	GP	G	A	Pts	PIM
2012	Russia	WJC18	5th	6	1	1	2	0
2014	Russia	WJC	3rd place, bronze medalist(s)	7	3	3	6	4
2017	Russia	WC	3rd place, bronze medalist(s)	10	0	3	3	2
2018	OAR	OG	1st place, gold medalist(s)	6	1	1	2	2
2018	Russia	WC	6th	8	4	4	8	2
2019	Russia	WC	3rd place, bronze medalist(s)	10	0	3	3	2
2021	ROC	WC	5th	8	4	4	8	2
Junior totals				13	4	4	8	4
Senior totals				42	9	15	24	10

== Awards and honors ==
Award	Year
KHL
Gagarin Cup (SKA Saint Petersburg)	2015, 2017
