= Anton Karlsson (ice hockey, born 1996) =

Swedish ice hockey player

- Born: August 3, 1996 (age 30) Lerum, Sweden
- Height: 6 ft 1 in (185 cm)
- Weight: 187 lb (85 kg; 13 st 5 lb)
- Position: Winger
- Shoots: Left
- EIHL team Former teams: Manchester Storm; Skellefteå AIK; Frölunda HC; EC VSV; Leksands IF; Storhamar; Orli Znojmo; SønderjyskE; Stjernen; Falu IF; Fife Flyers
- NHL draft: 87th overall, 2014; Arizona Coyotes
- Playing career: 2013–present

Anton Karlsson (born August 3, 1996) is a Swedish professional ice hockey forward who is currently playing with Manchester Storm in the UK's Elite Ice Hockey League (EIHL). He was selected in the 5th round (164th overall) by Lokomotiv Yaroslavl in the 2013 KHL Junior Draft and was also drafted by the Arizona Coyotes in the third round (87th overall) of the 2014 NHL entry draft.

== Playing career ==
At the age of 17, Karlsson made his professional debut on loan from Frölunda HC with the Mora IK of HockeyAllsvenskan during the 2013–14 season, appearing in 9 scoreless games.

Karlsson made his Swedish Hockey League debut playing with Skellefteå AIK during the 2014–15 SHL season, playing in 6 games for 1 assist before returning to Frölunda HC mid-season on November 29, 2014.

On April 23, 2017, Karlsson left Frölunda for a second time, signing a two-year contract with former team, Leksands IF of the Allsvenskan.

Karlsson has since played in Austria for EC VSV, Sweden with Falu IF, Norway with Storhamar and Stjernen, Czech Republic with Orli Znojmo and Denmark with SønderjyskE.

Then in November 2025, Karlsson agreed terms with Scottish Elite Ice Hockey League side Fife Flyers. On 1 July 2026, Karlsson moved to fellow EIHL side Manchester Storm.

== International play ==
Medal record

Ice hockey

Representing Sweden

World Junior Championships
Silver medal – second place	2014 Malmö	

Karlsson captained the Swedish team at the 2013 Ivan Hlinka Memorial Tournament, and won a silver medal playing with Team Sweden at the 2014 World Junior Ice Hockey Championships.

Karlsson is Sweden's all-time leader in games played in international junior competition, in 106 games played Karlsson scored 22 goals and 34 assists for a total of 56 points.

== Personal ==
Anton is the younger brother of Erik Karlsson, who also currently plays for Modo Hockey in the HockeyAllsvenskan (Allsv).

== Career statistics ==
=== Regular season and playoffs ===
			Regular season					Playoffs
Season	Team	League	GP	G	A	Pts	PIM	GP	G	A	Pts	PIM
2012–13	Frölunda HC	J20	17	4	4	8	4	3	1	1	2	0
2013–14	Frölunda HC	J20	28	12	10	22	88	3	0	2	2	2
2013–14	Mora IK	Allsv	9	0	0	0	2	—	—	—	—	—
2014–15	Skellefteå AIK	J20	16	8	6	14	37	—	—	—	—	—
2014–15	Skellefteå AIK	SHL	6	0	1	1	0	—	—	—	—	—
2014–15	Frölunda HC	SHL	9	0	1	1	2	—	—	—	—	—
2014–15	Frölunda HC	J20	16	6	9	15	4	8	3	7	10	6
2015–16	Frölunda HC	J20	8	1	2	3	2	—	—	—	—	—
2015–16	Frölunda HC	SHL	19	0	2	2	2	—	—	—	—	—
2015–16	BIK Karlskoga	Allsv	3	1	1	2	0	—	—	—	—	—
2015–16	Leksands IF	Allsv	21	2	6	8	6	14	1	3	4	2
2016–17	Frölunda HC	SHL	6	0	0	0	0	—	—	—	—	—
2016–17	IK Oskarshamn	Allsv	48	6	4	10	16	—	—	—	—	—
2017–18	Leksands IF	Allsv	48	8	11	19	12	11	0	1	1	6
2018–19	Leksands IF	Allsv	49	11	10	21	22	12	5	1	6	2
2019–20	EC VSV	EBEL	48	19	15	34	18	3	1	1	2	0
2020–21	AIK	Allsv	45	14	10	24	16	6	1	2	3	2
2021–22	EC VSV	ICEHL	38	14	14	28	4	12	7	6	13	2
SHL totals			40	0	4	4	4	—	—	—	—	—

=== International ===
Year	Team	Event	Result	GP	G	A	Pts	PIM
2012	Sweden	IH18	3rd place, bronze medalist(s)	5	0	2	2	4
2013	Sweden	U17	1st place, gold medalist(s)	6	6	3	9	22
2013	Sweden	U18	5th	5	2	2	4	10
2013	Sweden	IH18	7th	4	1	4	5	0
2014	Sweden	U18	4th	7	0	0	0	4
2014	Sweden	WJC	2nd place, silver medalist(s)	5	0	0	0	0
2015	Sweden	WJC	4th	7	0	2	2	6
2016	Sweden	WJC	4th	7	1	0	1	12
Junior totals				46	10	13	23	58

== Awards and honours ==
Award	Year
International
IIHF World U20 Championship Silver Medal with Team Sweden	2014
