= Valeri Vasilyev =

Russian ice hockey player (born 1994)

- Born: May 31, 1994 (age 31) Moscow, Russia
- Height: 6 ft 1 in (185 cm)
- Weight: 203 lb (92 kg; 14 st 7 lb)
- Position: Defence
- Shoots: Left
- team Former teams: Free agent Spartak Moscow; Avangard Omsk; Torpedo Nizhny Novgorod; Avtomobilist Yekaterinburg; Severstal Cherepovets; Metallurg Magnitogorsk; Amur Khabarovsk; HK 32 Liptovský Mikuláš
- NHL draft: 201st overall, 2012; Philadelphia Flyers
- Playing career: 2011–present

Valeri Sergeyevich Vasilyev (Russian: Валерий Сергеевич Васильев; born May 31, 1994) is a Russian professional ice hockey defenceman. He is currently an unrestricted free agent. Vasilyev was selected by the Philadelphia Flyers in the 7th round (201st overall) of the 2012 NHL entry draft.

== Playing career ==
Vasilyev made his Kontinental Hockey League (KHL) debut playing with HC Spartak Moscow during the 2012–13 season.

In the 2018–19 season, Vasilyev while in his second season with the Severstal Cherepovets, was traded to Metallurg Magnitogorsk on December 27, 2018. He was signed to an improved two-year contract to remain with Metallurg until 2020.

Approaching the final year of his contract, Vasilyev was traded by Metallurg alongside Nikita Yazkov to Amur Khabarovsk in exchange for financial compensation on May 2, 2019.

== Career statistics ==
=== Regular season and playoffs ===
			Regular season					Playoffs
Season	Team	League	GP	G	A	Pts	PIM	GP	G	A	Pts	PIM
2011–12	MHK Spartak Moscow	MHL	18	1	1	2	24	—	—	—	—	—
2012–13	MHK Spartak Moscow	MHL	33	2	4	6	57	20	1	1	2	30
2012–13	Spartak Moscow	KHL	11	0	1	1	4	—	—	—	—	—
2013–14	Spartak Moscow	KHL	36	0	3	3	14	—	—	—	—	—
2014–15	Avangard Omsk	KHL	26	1	2	3	13	—	—	—	—	—
2014–15	Sokol Krasnoyarsk	VHL	3	0	0	0	2	—	—	—	—	—
2014–15	Torpedo Nizhny Novgorod	KHL	9	1	1	2	0	—	—	—	—	—
2014–15	Chaika Nizhny Novgorod	MHL	—	—	—	—	—	3	0	0	0	6
2015–16	Avangard Omsk	KHL	11	0	1	1	6	2	0	0	0	0
2016–17	Avangard Omsk	KHL	2	0	0	0	0	—	—	—	—	—
2016–17	Avtomobilist Yekaterinburg	KHL	21	0	0	0	18	—	—	—	—	—
2017–18	Severstal Cherepovets	KHL	43	7	9	16	44	—	—	—	—	—
2018–19	Severstal Cherepovets	KHL	15	1	1	2	10	—	—	—	—	—
2018–19	Metallurg Magnitogorsk	KHL	9	0	0	0	4	2	0	0	0	0
2019–20	Amur Khabarovsk	KHL	48	6	5	11	32	—	—	—	—	—
2020–21	Amur Khabarovsk	KHL	44	2	9	11	59	—	—	—	—	—
2021–22	Amur Khabarovsk	KHL	16	0	2	2	33	—	—	—	—	—
2021–22	Sokol Krasnoyarsk	VHL	12	1	4	5	6	5	1	1	2	4
2022–23	Sokol Krasnoyarsk	VHL	21	3	6	9	16	—	—	—	—	—
2022–23	HC Yugra	VHL	21	3	4	7	16	1	0	0	0	0
2023–24	HK 32 Liptovský Mikuláš	Slovak	26	2	7	9	16	—	—	—	—	—
KHL totals			291	18	34	52	237	4	0	0	0	0

Medal record

Representing Russia

Ice hockey

World Junior Championships
Gold medal – first place	2014 Sweden	

=== International ===
Year	Team	Event	Result	GP	G	A	Pts	PIM
2011	Russia	IH18	3rd place, bronze medalist(s)	5	0	0	0	12
2014	Russia	WJC	3rd place, bronze medalist(s)	7	1	0	1	4
Junior totals				12	1	0	1	16
