= Brandon Manning =

Canadian ice hockey player (born 1990)

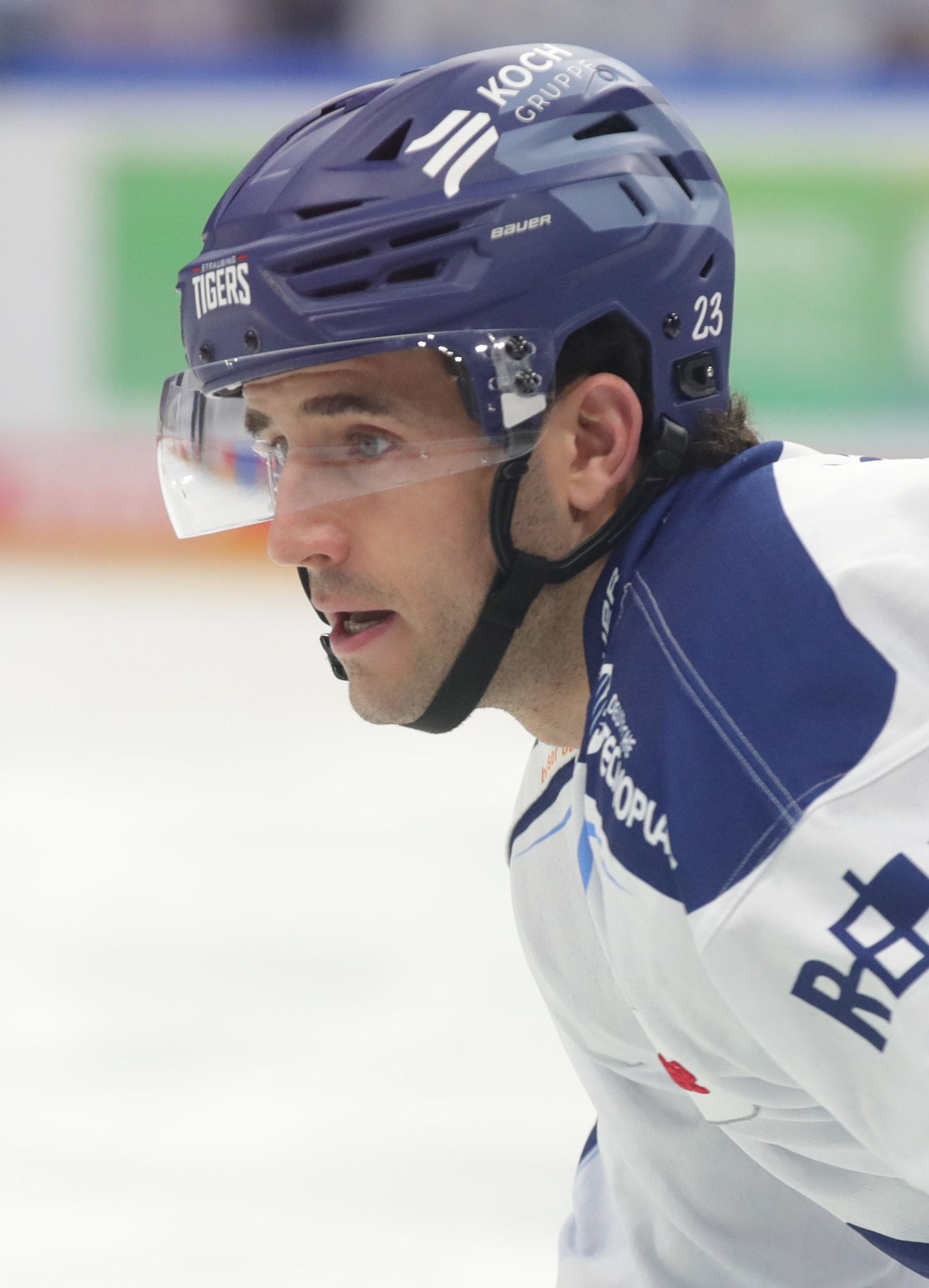
- Manning with the Straubing Tigers in 2022
- Born: June 4, 1990 (age 36) Prince George, British Columbia, Canada
- Height: 6 ft 1 in (185 cm)
- Weight: 200 lb (91 kg; 14 st 4 lb)
- Position: Defence
- Shoots: Left
- team Former teams: Free Agent; Philadelphia Flyers; Chicago Blackhawks; Edmonton Oilers; Straubing Tigers; IF Björklöven
- NHL draft: Undrafted
- Playing career: 2011–present

Brandon Manning (born June 4, 1990) is a Canadian professional ice hockey defenceman who is currently an unrestricted free agent. He most recently played for IF Björklöven in the Swedish second tier HockeyAllsvenskan (Allsv). Manning previously played in the National Hockey League (NHL) for the Philadelphia Flyers, Chicago Blackhawks, and the Edmonton Oilers.

== Playing career ==
Prior to turning professional, Manning played major junior hockey in the Western Hockey League with the Chilliwack Bruins.

On November 23, 2010, during the 2010–11 season with Chilliwack, the Philadelphia Flyers signed Manning as an undrafted free agent.

On March 8, 2012, after playing 32 games (9 points) for Adirondack Phantoms in 2011–12 AHL season, he was called up to the Flyers main roster to replace injured Pavel Kubina. He made his NHL debut the same day in a home game against Florida Panthers. On August 27, 2014, Manning signed a one-year contract to stay with the Flyers. On March 21, 2016, Manning scored his first career NHL goal against Thomas Greiss of the New York Islanders.

On December 8, 2016, in a post-game interview following a loss against the Flyers, Edmonton Oilers forward Connor McDavid claimed Manning boasted on-ice that he intentionally broke McDavid's collarbone the year before on November 3, 2015, which sidelined the Oiler's star for 37 games, calling it "one of the [most] classless things [he's] ever seen on the ice". Manning denied the claim, reiterating that it was a "total accident" and that "there was never any intention of hurting anyone".

On February 27, 2017, Manning was suspended two games for interference against Jake Guentzel. Manning concluded the 2016–17 season with 12 points in 65 games. During the 2017–18 season, Manning recorded a career-high 7 goals and 19 points in 65 games to help the Flyers qualify for the 2018 Stanley Cup playoffs. The Flyers ended up losing in 6 games to the Pittsburgh Penguins.

On July 1, 2018, Manning left the Flyers as a free agent and agreed to a two-year contract with the Chicago Blackhawks. He began the 2018–19 season on the Blackhawks third defensive pairing, adding 1 goal and 2 assists in 27 games before he was traded by Chicago, along with Robin Norell, to the Edmonton Oilers in exchange for Drake Caggiula and Jason Garrison on December 30, 2018. Manning scored 1 goal in 12 games with the Oilers, before on February 18, 2019, he was placed on waivers by the Oilers and later reassigned to AHL affiliate the Bakersfield Condors. While with the Condors, Manning was suspended for five games for using a racial slur against Boko Imama of the Ontario Reign. During his second game after the suspension, Manning was involved in a fight with Imama.

For the 2020–2021 season, Manning chose to take a break from professional hockey to focus on family.

On July 31, 2021, Manning returned to the professional ranks, having signed a one-year contract with European club, the Straubing Tigers of the Deutsche Eishockey Liga. In the 2021–22 season, his first season abroad, Manning contributed with 21 assists through 38 regular season games for the Tigers. He made 4 post-season appearances in a 3-1 quarterfinal series defeat to Adler Mannheim.

== Career statistics ==
			Regular season					Playoffs
Season	Team	League	GP	G	A	Pts	PIM	GP	G	A	Pts	PIM
2006–07	Cariboo Cougars	BCMML	34	9	13	22	65	—	—	—	—	—
2007–08	Prince George Spruce Kings	BCHL	58	7	19	26	107	4	0	3	3	6
2007–08	Chilliwack Bruins	WHL	6	0	0	0	8	4	0	0	0	4
2008–09	Chilliwack Bruins	WHL	72	11	18	29	140	—	—	—	—	—
2009–10	Chilliwack Bruins	WHL	69	13	41	54	138	6	0	6	6	10
2010–11	Chilliwack Bruins	WHL	53	21	32	53	129	5	1	0	1	8
2011–12	Adirondack Phantoms	AHL	46	6	13	19	81	—	—	—	—	—
2011–12	Philadelphia Flyers	NHL	4	0	0	0	0	—	—	—	—	—
2012–13	Adirondack Phantoms	AHL	65	6	15	21	135	—	—	—	—	—
2012–13	Philadelphia Flyers	NHL	6	0	2	2	0	—	—	—	—	—
2013–14	Adirondack Phantoms	AHL	73	8	23	31	231	—	—	—	—	—
2014–15	Lehigh Valley Phantoms	AHL	60	11	32	43	150	—	—	—	—	—
2014–15	Philadelphia Flyers	NHL	11	0	3	3	7	—	—	—	—	—
2015–16	Philadelphia Flyers	NHL	56	1	6	7	66	6	0	1	1	4
2016–17	Philadelphia Flyers	NHL	65	3	9	12	83	—	—	—	—	—
2017–18	Philadelphia Flyers	NHL	65	7	12	19	56	6	0	0	0	14
2018–19	Chicago Blackhawks	NHL	27	1	2	3	21	—	—	—	—	—
2018–19	Edmonton Oilers	NHL	12	1	0	1	4	—	—	—	—	—
2018–19	Bakersfield Condors	AHL	8	0	0	0	15	—	—	—	—	—
2019–20	Edmonton Oilers	NHL	9	1	0	1	17	—	—	—	—	—
2019–20	Bakersfield Condors	AHL	21	0	9	9	29	—	—	—	—	—
2021–22	Straubing Tigers	DEL	38	1	21	22	36	4	0	1	1	6
2022–23	Straubing Tigers	DEL	43	2	17	19	35	7	1	3	4	2
2023–24	IF Björklöven	Allsv	31	3	9	12	78	2	0	0	0	0
NHL totals			255	14	34	48	254	12	0	1	1	18
