= Linus Arnesson =

Swedish ice hockey player

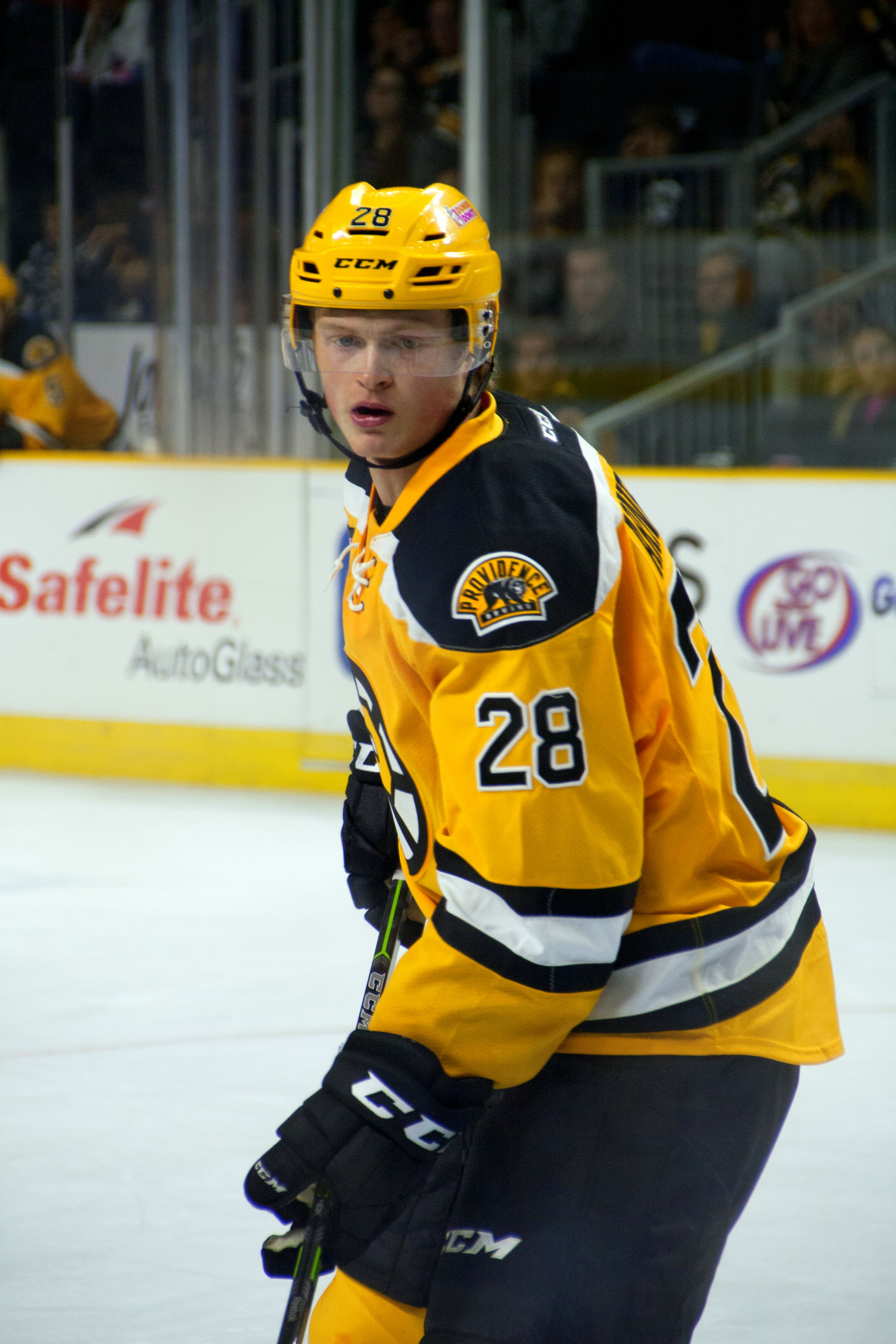
- Arnesson with the Providence Bruins in 2017
- Born: September 21, 1994 (age 31) Stockholm, Sweden
- Height: 6 ft 2 in (188 cm)
- Weight: 198 lb (90 kg; 14 st 2 lb)
- Position: Defence
- Shoots: Left
- SHL team Former teams: Örebro HK; Djurgårdens IF; Providence Bruins; Färjestad BK
- NHL draft: 60th overall, 2013; Boston Bruins
- Playing career: 2012–present

Linus Arnesson (born September 21, 1994) is a Swedish professional ice hockey defenceman. He is currently playing with Örebro HK in the Swedish Hockey League (SHL). Arnesson was selected by the Boston Bruins in the 2nd round (60th overall) of the 2013 NHL entry draft.

== Playing career ==
Arnesson played in his native Sweden as a youth within Djurgårdens IF organization. On June 1, 2014, Arnesson was signed by the Boston Bruins to a three-year entry-level contract.

After the conclusion of the 2014–15 SHL season, Arnesson made his way over to America to join the Bruins AHL affiliate, the Providence Bruins.

Arnesson played two full seasons in the American Hockey League with Providence, however was unable to make an impact within the Bruins prospect ranks. At the conclusion of his entry-level deal, Arnesson as an impending restricted free agent, opted to return to continue his career in Sweden, in agreeing to an optional three-year deal with Örebro HK on June 1, 2017.

Arnesson played two seasons with Örebro HK, leaving as a free agent following the 2018–19 season. He signed a two-year contract to remain in the SHL with Färjestad BK on April 24, 2019.

Arnesson played two seasons with his original club, Djurgårdens IF, before signing a contract for a second stint with Örebro HK on 9 May 2023.

== Career statistics ==
=== Regular season and playoffs ===
			Regular season					Playoffs
Season	Team	League	GP	G	A	Pts	PIM	GP	G	A	Pts	PIM
2010–11	Djurgårdens IF	J20	8	0	0	0	2	—	—	—	—	—
2011–12	Djurgårdens IF	J20	40	2	13	15	20	3	0	1	1	2
2011–12	Djurgårdens IF	SEL	3	0	0	0	0	—	—	—	—	—
2012–13	Djurgårdens IF	J20	13	1	3	4	22	1	0	0	0	0
2012–13	Djurgårdens IF	Allsv	31	0	1	1	8	4	0	0	0	0
2013–14	Djurgårdens IF	Allsv	44	1	5	6	36	6	0	0	0	2
2014–15	Djurgårdens IF	SHL	41	0	5	5	28	2	0	0	0	0
2014–15	Providence Bruins	AHL	11	1	3	4	6	—	—	—	—	—
2015–16	Providence Bruins	AHL	48	0	5	5	8	—	—	—	—	—
2016–17	Providence Bruins	AHL	20	0	1	1	8	13	0	1	1	2
2017–18	Örebro HK	SHL	43	0	2	2	14	—	—	—	—	—
2018–19	Örebro HK	SHL	50	5	8	13	12	2	0	1	1	0
2019–20	Färjestad BK	SHL	52	6	7	13	16	—	—	—	—	—
2020–21	Färjestad BK	SHL	44	0	5	5	12	4	0	1	1	0
2021–22	Djurgårdens IF	SHL	43	2	2	4	20	—	—	—	—	—
2022–23	Djurgårdens IF	Allsv	43	2	9	11	26	14	0	1	1	14
2023–24	Örebro HK	SHL	44	1	6	7	10	3	0	0	0	2
2024–25	Örebro HK	SHL	50	0	9	9	6	3	0	1	1	0
SHL totals			370	14	44	58	118	14	0	3	3	2

Medal record

Ice hockey

Representing Sweden

World Junior Championships
Silver medal – second place	2014 Malmö	
Silver medal – second place	2013 Ufa	

=== International ===
Year	Team	Event	Result	GP	G	A	Pts	PIM
2011	Sweden	IH18	2nd place, silver medalist(s)	5	0	1	1	0
2012	Sweden	U18	2nd place, silver medalist(s)	6	0	0	0	4
2013	Sweden	WJC	2nd place, silver medalist(s)	6	0	0	0	6
2014	Sweden	WJC	2nd place, silver medalist(s)	7	0	2	2	4
Junior totals				24	0	3	3	14
