= Dávid Gríger =

Slovak ice hockey player

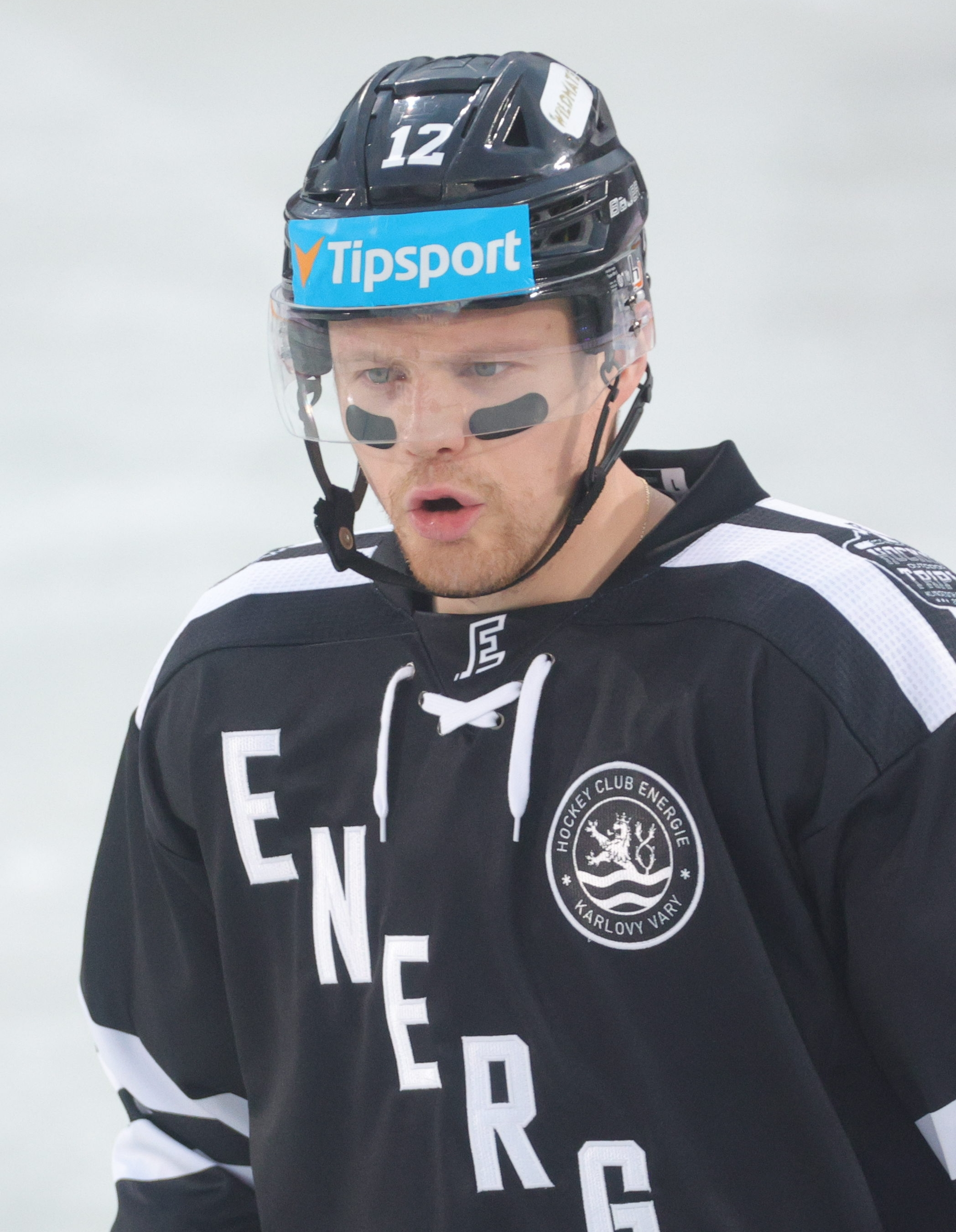
- Gríger in 2024
- Born: November 28, 1994 (age 31) Poprad, Slovakia
- Height: 5 ft 10 in (178 cm)
- Weight: 154 lb (70 kg; 11 st 0 lb)
- Position: Centre
- Shoots: Right
- Czech team Former teams: HC Karlovy Vary; HK Poprad; HK Orange 20; HC Dukla Jihlava; HC Bílí Tygři Liberec
- NHL draft: Undrafted
- Playing career: 2012–present

Dávid Gríger (born November 28, 1994) is a Slovak professional ice hockey centre for HC Karlovy Vary of the Czech Extraliga.

Griger made his professional debut in the Slovak Extraliga playing with HK Poprad during the 2012–13 Slovak Extraliga season. He joined the junior side of HC Karlovy Vary in 2013, playing for the senior side before spending two seasons with league rivals HC Bílí Tygři Liberec. He later returned to Karlovy Vary, making his 400th appearances in the Czech Extraliga in November 2024.

== Career statistics ==
=== Regular season and playoffs ===
			Regular season					Playoffs
Season	Team	League	GP	G	A	Pts	PIM	GP	G	A	Pts	PIM
Czech totals			162	44	49	93	108	13	6	4	10	4
Slovak totals			39	5	5	10	8	13	4	2	6	4

=== International ===
Year	Team	Event	Result	GP	G	A	Pts	PIM
2012	Slovakia	WJC18-D1	11th	5	0	10	10	10
2014	Slovakia	WJC	8th	5	3	7	10	0
Junior totals				10	3	17	20	10
