= Andrei Mironov (ice hockey) =

Russian ice hockey player (born 1994)

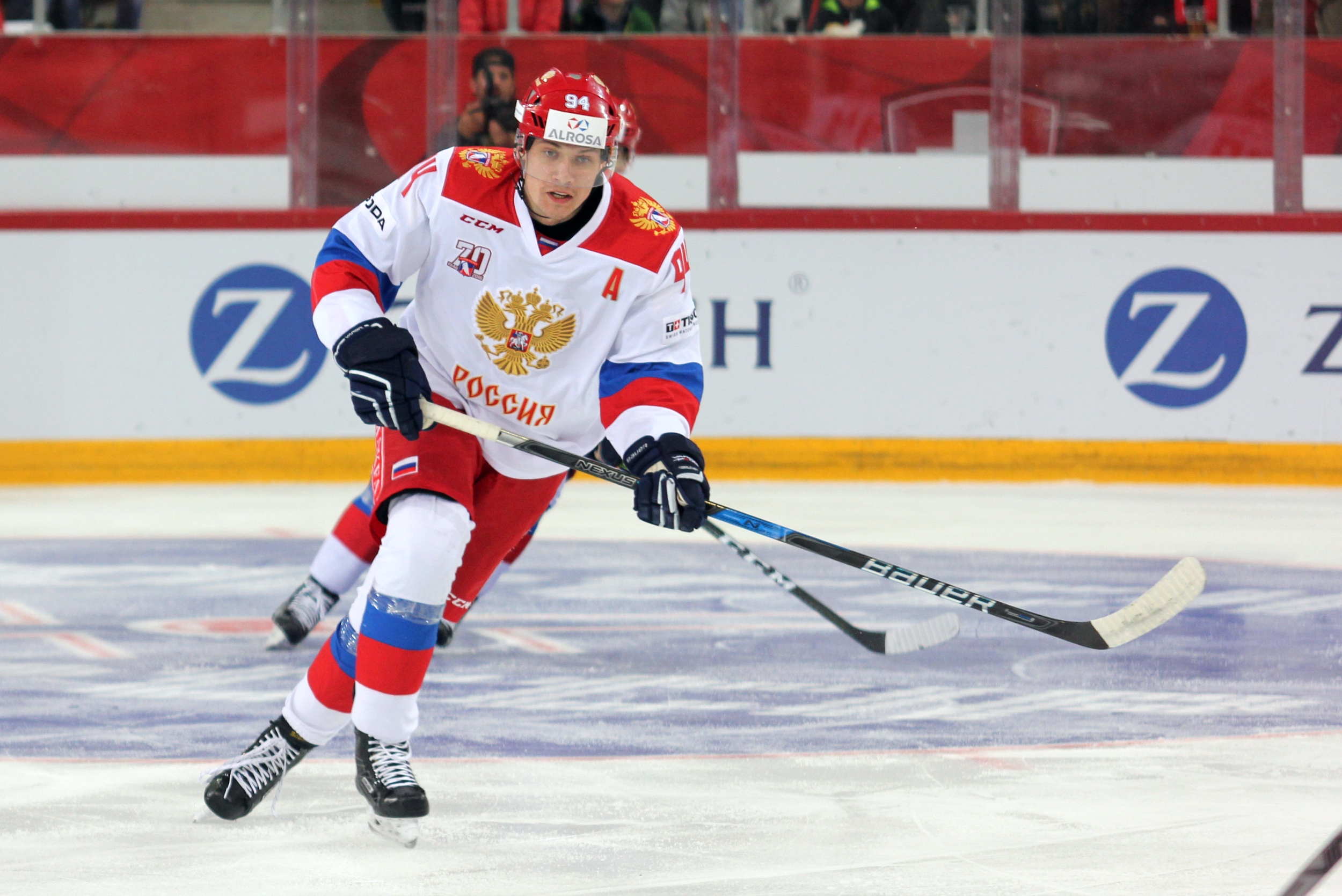
- Born: 29 July 1994 (age 31) Moscow, Russia
- Height: 6 ft 2 in (188 cm)
- Weight: 198 lb (90 kg; 14 st 2 lb)
- Position: Defence
- Shoots: Left
- KHL team Former teams: Spartak Moscow; Dynamo Moscow; Colorado Avalanche
- National team: Russia
- NHL draft: 101st overall, 2015; Colorado Avalanche
- Playing career: 2011–present

Andrei Andreyevich Mironov (Russian: Андрей Андреевич Миронов; born 29 July 1994) is a Russian professional ice hockey defenceman who is currently under contract to Spartak Moscow of the Kontinental Hockey League (KHL). He was selected by the Colorado Avalanche, 101st overall, in the 2015 NHL entry draft.

== Playing career ==
Mironov played as a youth within his hometown Moscow, and was drafted in the fourth round, 103rd overall in the KHL Junior Draft by Dynamo Moscow in 2011. As a defensively minded player on the blueline, he appeared in the Minor Hockey League with HC MVD junior club in the 2011–12 season. He made his senior KHL debut playing with Dynamo during the 2012–13 KHL season. Appearing in an impressive 40 games, for 5 assists, and in all 18 post-season games, Mironov contributed to help Dynamo capture the Gagarin Cup in his first professional season.

Mironov was signed by Dynamo Moscow to a two-year contract extension on 12 September 2013. Having established his role as a regular on the blueline of Dynamo as an 18-year-old, Mironov improved his point totals in the following season with 3 goals and 7 assists in 46 games.

At the conclusion of his third season in the KHL in which he was a selection to the 2015 KHL All-Star Game, Mironov was swiftly signed to a two-year contract extension with Dynamo Moscow on 22 April 2015. After he was passed over in the three preceding drafts, Mironov was selected 101st overall by the Colorado Avalanche, marking their first Russian selection since 2004, in the 2015 NHL entry draft on 27 June 2015.

In the 2016–17 season, Mironov was limited to just 18 games contributing with 4 points due to injury. He returned to health in the post-season for Dynamo, before losing in the Conference semi-finals to eventual champions SKA Saint Petersburg. With the Avalanche signalling strong interest to bring Mironov over to North America, Mironov was released from the remainder of his contract with Dynamo and agreed to a two-year, entry-level contract with Colorado on 12 May 2017.

After attending his first training camp with the Avalanche, Mironov made the team's opening roster to begin the 2017–18 season. He made his NHL debut with Colorado in a 4-2 victory over the New York Rangers at Madison Square Gardens on 5 October 2017. While still adapting to the North American game, Mironov was primarily a healthy scratch before he was re-assigned on a conditioning stint to AHL affiliate, the San Antonio Rampage on 19 October 2017. Following his return to Colorado, Mironov featured in 7 games over the month of November, scoring his first NHL goal and adding an assist in a 5-2 defeat to the Nashville Predators on 18 November 2017.

Unable to earn regular playing time on the Avalanche blueline, Mironov was returned to the Rampage to continue his development for another month before he was again recalled and featured in his 10th game, a 6-1 victory over the New York Islanders on December 31, 2017. Despite the win, Mironov was unable to draw back into the Avalanche lineup and was returned again to the Rampage. With the Avalanche hit through injury, Mironov received multiple call-ups as a healthy scratch. Unwilling to continue in the AHL, Mironov opted to end the remainder of his contract with the Avalanche and was placed on unconditional waivers for a mutual termination on 2 March 2018.

Mironov sat out for the remainder of the season before signing a three-year KHL contract in a return to original club, Dynamo Moscow, on May 17, 2018.

At the conclusion of the 2023–24 season, having played 11 seasons within the Dynamo Moscow organization, Mironov left the club as a free agent and was signed to a two-year contract with cross-town rivals Spartak Moscow on 1 May 2024.

== International play ==
Medal record

Representing Russia

Ice hockey

World Championships
Silver medal – second place	2015 Czech Republic	
Bronze medal – third place	2017 Germany/France	

World Junior Championships
Bronze medal – third place	2013 Russia	
Bronze medal – third place	2014 Sweden	

Mironov was first selected to play at the international level with Russia's under-18 Team at the 2012 IIHF World U18 Championships in the Czech Republic. He played in all 6 games for Russia on the blueline on way to a 5th-place finish. Mironov, represented Russia at the 2013 and 2014 World Junior Championships, helping his native country earn a bronze medal at both events while contributing six points in 14 contests.

As a 20-year-old, Mironov was the youngest player selected to the Team Russia for the 2015 IIHF World Championship. Mironov made his senior debut in the third group stage game in a 4–2 defeat against the United States, on 4 May 2015. He contributed his first assist in a 7–0 victory over Belarus on 9 May 2015. He would finish the Tournament having played in 8 games for a single assist as Russia claimed the Silver Medal after defeat in the Final to Canada.

== Career statistics ==
=== Regular season and playoffs ===
			Regular season					Playoffs
Season	Team	League	GP	G	A	Pts	PIM	GP	G	A	Pts	PIM
2011–12	HC MVD	MHL	59	1	8	9	87	—	—	—	—	—
2012–13	Dynamo Moscow	KHL	40	0	5	5	26	18	1	2	3	8
2012–13	HC MVD	MHL	6	0	1	1	0	1	0	0	0	4
2013–14	Dynamo Moscow	KHL	46	3	7	10	16	7	0	1	1	6
2013–14	HC MVD	MHL	3	0	1	1	2	—	—	—	—	—
2014–15	Dynamo Moscow	KHL	52	5	3	8	20	11	0	1	1	6
2014–15	Dynamo Balashikha	VHL	1	0	0	0	2	—	—	—	—	—
2015–16	Dynamo Moscow	KHL	40	3	10	13	21	9	1	1	2	6
2016–17	Dynamo Moscow	KHL	18	1	3	4	10	9	0	3	3	4
2017–18	Colorado Avalanche	NHL	10	1	2	3	12	—	—	—	—	—
2017–18	San Antonio Rampage	AHL	26	1	8	9	26	—	—	—	—	—
2018–19	Dynamo Moscow	KHL	41	0	5	5	50	11	1	0	1	24
2019–20	Dynamo Moscow	KHL	61	4	13	17	35	6	0	3	3	2
2020–21	Dynamo Moscow	KHL	59	7	22	29	42	10	0	0	0	34
2021–22	Dynamo Moscow	KHL	48	2	8	10	22	11	1	0	1	2
2022–23	Dynamo Moscow	KHL	65	9	23	32	44	6	0	4	4	4
2023–24	Dynamo Moscow	KHL	66	5	16	21	51	10	0	0	0	12
2024–25	Spartak Moscow	KHL	50	7	18	25	26	12	1	5	6	6
2025–26	Spartak Moscow	KHL	66	6	15	21	44	5	0	0	0	0
KHL totals			652	52	148	200	407	125	5	20	25	114
NHL totals			10	1	2	3	12	—	—	—	—	—

=== International ===
Year	Team	Event	Result	GP	G	A	Pts	PIM
2012	Russia	U18	5th	6	1	0	1	0
2013	Russia	WJC	3rd place, bronze medalist(s)	7	1	1	2	2
2014	Russia	WJC	3rd place, bronze medalist(s)	7	1	3	4	4
2015	Russia	WC	2nd place, silver medalist(s)	8	0	1	1	2
2017	Russia	WC	3rd place, bronze medalist(s)	6	1	0	1	4
Junior totals				20	3	4	7	6
Senior totals				14	1	1	2	6

== Awards and honours ==
Award	Year
KHL
Gagarin Cup (Dynamo Moscow)	2013
All-Star Game	2015
