= Erik Karlsson (ice hockey, born 1994) =

Swedish ice hockey player (born 1994)

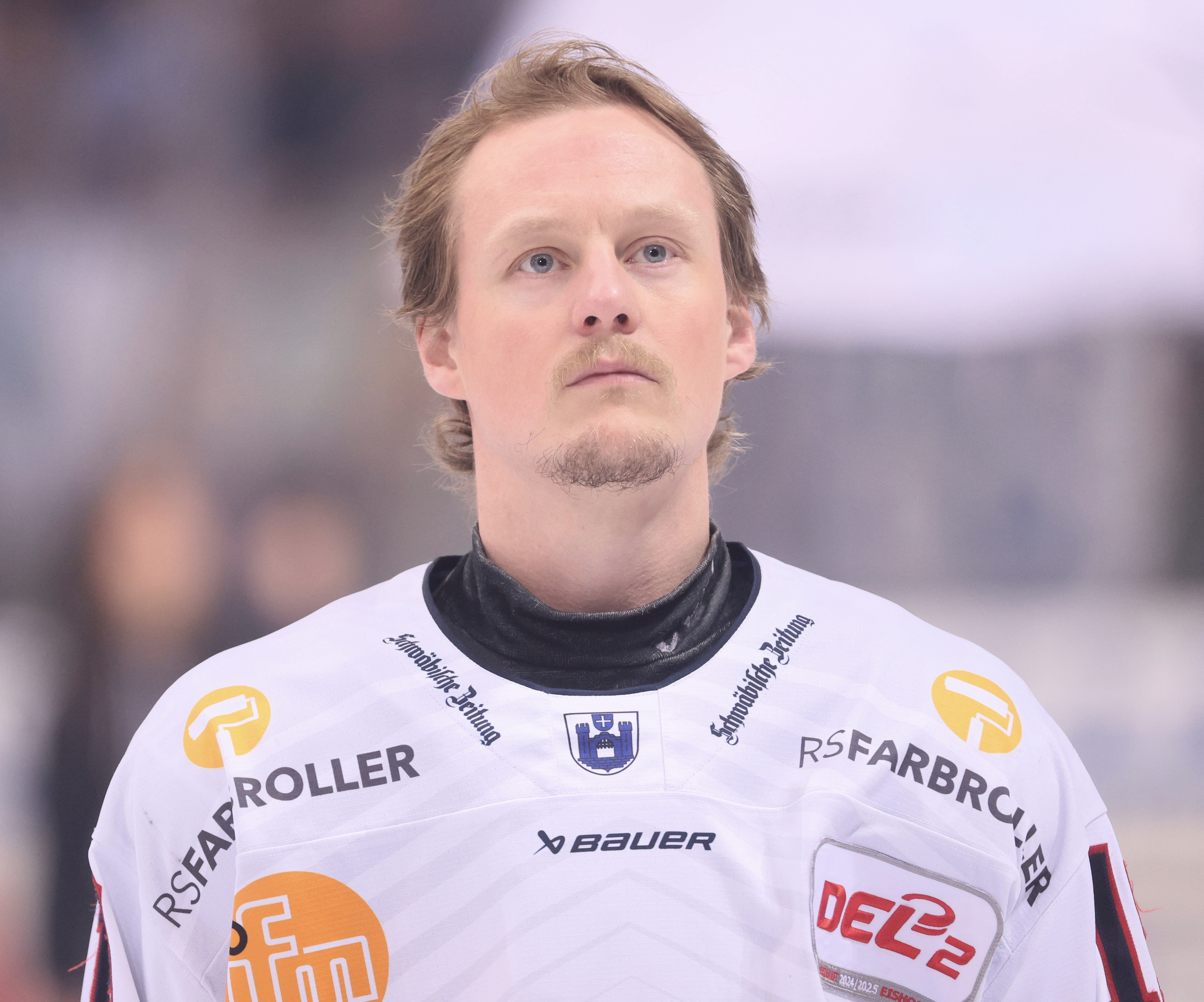
- Karlsson with Ravensburg Towerstars in 2025
- Born: 28 July 1994 (age 31) Lerum, Sweden
- Height: 6 ft 0 in (183 cm)
- Weight: 170 lb (77 kg; 12 st 2 lb)
- Position: Centre/Winger
- Shoots: Right
- SHL team Former teams: Modo Hockey; Frölunda HC; KooKoo
- NHL draft: 99th overall, 2012; Carolina Hurricanes
- Playing career: 2012–present

Erik Jinesjö Karlsson (born 28 July 1994) is a Swedish professional ice hockey forward who is currently playing with Ravensburg Towerstars of the Deutsche Eishockey Liga 2 (DEL2 ). Karlsson was drafted in the fourth round, 99th overall, in the 2012 NHL entry draft by the Carolina Hurricanes.

== Playing career ==
Karlsson developed as a youth in his native Sweden with the Frölunda HC organization after starting his hockey career in Lerums BK. He played in his first Elitserien game on 18 December 2012, against AIK. On May 27, 2014, Karlsson was signed to a two-year, entry-level contract with the Carolina Hurricanes.

After two seasons in the American Hockey League with the Hurricanes affiliate, the Charlotte Checkers, Karlsson was continuing to struggle at the North American game. As an impending restricted free agent, Karlsson opted to return to Sweden in agreeing to a one-year contract with Timrå IK of the Allsvenskan on May 11, 2017. His NHL rights were later relinquished by the Hurricanes.

Serving as an Alternate captain with Timrå in the 2017–18 season, Karlsson produced 9 goals and 28 points in 52 games. As a free agent Karlsson opted to leave Sweden, signing a one-year contract with Finnish club, KooKoo of the Liiga, on April 9, 2018.

== Personal ==
Erik is the younger brother of Anton Karlsson, who also currently plays for Storhamar Dragons in the Eliteserien (Norway).

== Career statistics ==
=== Regular season and playoffs ===
			Regular season					Playoffs
Season	Team	League	GP	G	A	Pts	PIM	GP	G	A	Pts	PIM
2010–11	Frölunda HC	J20	29	4	9	13	41	7	1	1	2	4
2011–12	Frölunda HC	J20	47	14	19	33	70	2	0	0	0	0
2012–13	Frölunda HC	J20	40	10	25	35	48	6	1	5	6	0
2012–13	Frölunda HC	SEL	5	0	0	0	0	—	—	—	—	—
2012–13	Karlskrona HK	Allsv	2	0	1	1	0	—	—	—	—	—
2013–14	Frölunda HC	J20	9	5	10	15	2	—	—	—	—	—
2013–14	Frölunda HC	SHL	41	5	1	6	6	6	1	0	1	0
2014–15	Frölunda HC	SHL	53	1	2	3	6	7	0	0	0	2
2015–16	Charlotte Checkers	AHL	49	3	6	9	6	—	—	—	—	—
2015–16	Florida Everblades	ECHL	3	0	0	0	0	—	—	—	—	—
2016–17	Charlotte Checkers	AHL	42	0	7	7	6	—	—	—	—	—
2017–18	Timrå IK	Allsv	52	9	19	28	20	10	2	6	8	0
2018–19	KooKoo	Liiga	51	3	20	23	26	—	—	—	—	—
2019–20	KooKoo	Liiga	52	7	19	26	10	—	—	—	—	—
2020–21	KooKoo	Liiga	55	7	10	17	39	2	0	0	0	0
2021–22	Modo Hockey	Allsv	50	9	25	34	12	13	2	9	11	0
2022–23	Modo Hockey	Allsv	52	11	20	31	8	16	3	4	7	0
2023–24	Modo Hockey	SHL	41	2	5	7	2	—	—	—	—	—
SHL totals			140	8	8	16	14	13	1	0	1	2
Liiga totals			158	17	49	66	75	2	0	0	0	0

=== International ===
Year	Team	Event	Result	GP	G	A	Pts	PIM
2011	Sweden	IH18	2nd place, silver medalist(s)	5	2	1	3	0
2012	Sweden	WJC18	2nd place, silver medalist(s)	6	1	2	3	2
2014	Sweden	WJC	2nd place, silver medalist(s)	7	0	3	3	2
Junior totals				18	3	6	9	4
