= Robin Norell =

Swedish ice hockey player

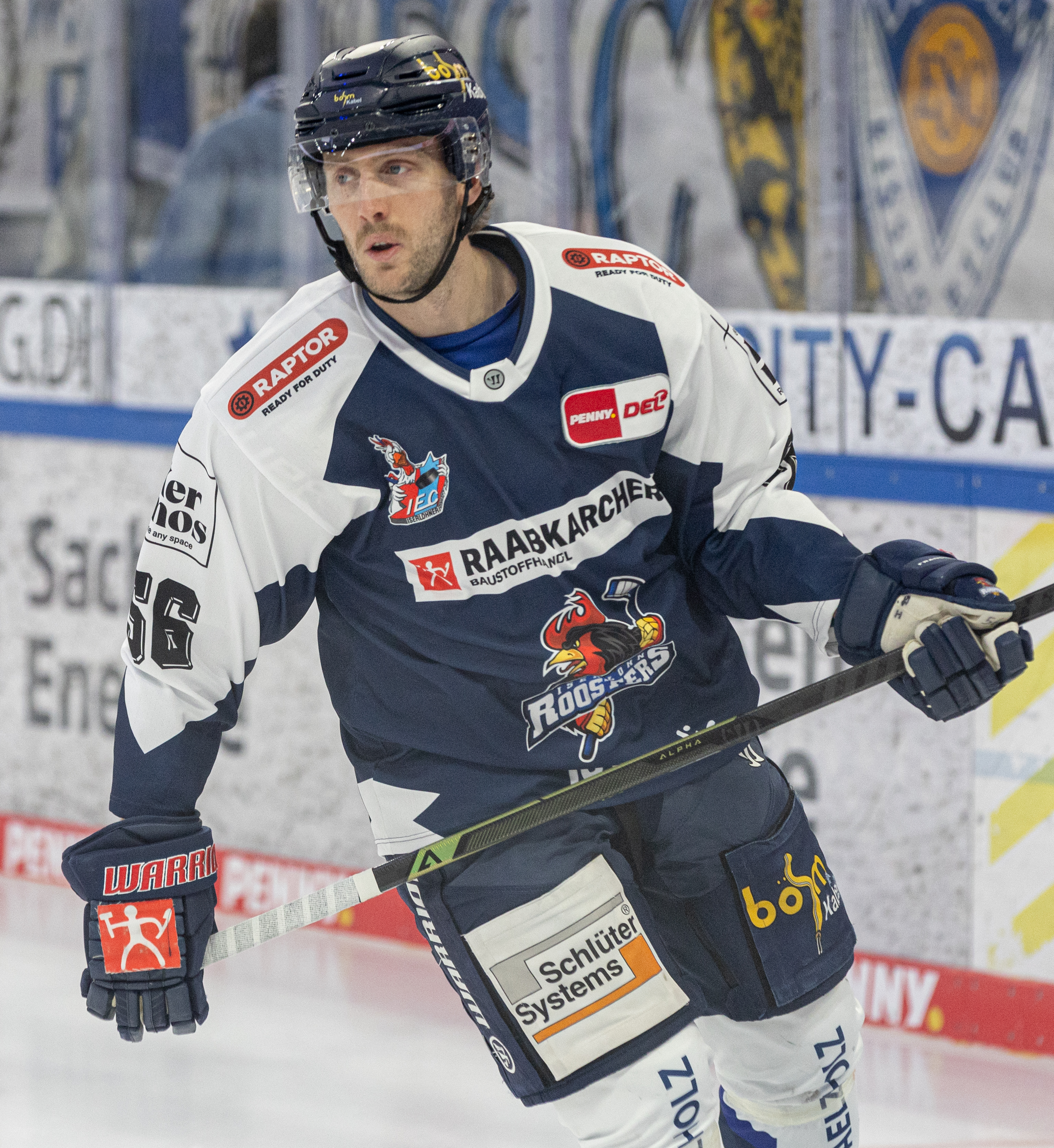
- Norell with the Iserlohn Roosters in 2025
- Born: February 18, 1995 (age 31) Stockholm, Sweden
- Height: 5 ft 11 in (180 cm)
- Weight: 192 lb (87 kg; 13 st 10 lb)
- Position: Defence
- Shoots: Left
- DEL team Former teams: Iserlohn Roosters; Djurgårdens IF; Rockford IceHogs; IK Oskarshamn; Örebro HK
- NHL draft: 111th overall, 2013; Chicago Blackhawks
- Playing career: 2013–present

Robin Norell (born February 18, 1995) is a Swedish professional ice hockey defenceman for the Iserlohn Roosters of the Deutsche Eishockey Liga (DEL). Norell was selected by the Chicago Blackhawks in the fourth round (111th overall) of the 2013 NHL entry draft.

== Playing career ==
Norell began playing hockey in Huddinge IK and later moved to Djurgårdens IF to play in the junior organization of the club. Norell signed his first professional contract, a two-year deal with Djurgården, for the 2013–14 season. He extended his contract with Djurgården for another season in May 2015. After the 2015–16 season in the SHL, Norell left Djurgården and signed a three-year entry-level contract with the Chicago Blackhawks on March 31, 2016.

Approaching the final year of his entry-level deal with the Blackhawks, having made a limited impact with American Hockey League affiliate, the Rockford IceHogs, Norell opted to return to his native Sweden and re-join Djurgårdens IF on loan for the 2018–19 season on August 23, 2018. During the mid-point of the season, he agreed to a two-year contract extension to remain with Djurgården through 2021 on December 17, 2018. Norell's NHL contract was included in a trade by the Blackhawks, along with Brandon Manning, to the Edmonton Oilers in exchange for Drake Caggiula and Jason Garrison on December 30, 2018.

Following the conclusion of his contract with Djurgården, Norell, as a free agent, continued in the SHL, agreeing to a two-year contract with IK Oskarshamn on 28 April 2021.

After two seasons with Örebro HK, Norell left the SHL and moved to the German DEL, in agreeing to a one-year contract with Iserlohn Roosters on 18 July 2025.

== Career statistics ==
=== Regular season and playoffs ===
			Regular season					Playoffs
Season	Team	League	GP	G	A	Pts	PIM	GP	G	A	Pts	PIM
2011–12	Djurgårdens IF	J20	—	—	—	—	—	1	0	0	0	0
2012–13	Djurgårdens IF	J20	33	1	4	5	4	2	0	0	0	0
2013–14	Djurgårdens IF	J20	1	0	0	0	0	—	—	—	—	—
2013–14	Djurgårdens IF	Allsv	22	0	5	5	10	10	0	1	1	0
2014–15	Djurgårdens IF	J20	1	0	0	0	0	—	—	—	—	—
2014–15	Djurgårdens IF	SHL	48	3	6	9	12	2	0	0	0	0
2014–15	Rockford IceHogs	AHL	—	—	—	—	—	3	0	0	0	2
2015–16	Djurgårdens IF	SHL	51	2	6	8	16	7	0	0	0	2
2015–16	Rockford IceHogs	AHL	8	0	2	2	2	2	0	0	0	2
2016–17	Rockford IceHogs	AHL	65	1	8	9	18	—	—	—	—	—
2017–18	Rockford IceHogs	AHL	63	2	5	7	39	—	—	—	—	—
2018–19	Djurgårdens IF	SHL	52	1	5	6	18	19	2	4	6	8
2019–20	Djurgårdens IF	SHL	51	2	3	5	22	—	—	—	—	—
2020–21	Djurgårdens IF	SHL	52	3	3	6	26	3	0	0	0	0
2021–22	IK Oskarshamn	SHL	50	3	9	12	34	10	1	3	4	6
2022–23	IK Oskarshamn	SHL	52	2	3	5	24	3	0	0	0	0
2023–24	Örebro HK	SHL	52	2	2	4	18	3	0	1	1	4
2024–25	Örebro HK	SHL	52	1	4	5	28	2	0	0	0	0
SHL totals			460	19	41	60	198	49	3	8	11	20

Medal record

Ice hockey

Representing Sweden

World Junior Championships
Silver medal – second place	2014 Malmö	

=== International ===
Year	Team	Event	Result	GP	G	A	Pts	PIM
2013	Sweden	U18	5th	5	0	0	0	2
2014	Sweden	WJC	2nd place, silver medalist(s)	7	1	0	1	2
2015	Sweden	WJC	4th	7	0	1	1	4
Junior totals				19	1	1	2	8
