= Milan Kolena =

Slovak ice hockey player

- Born: May 12, 1994 (age 30); Martin, Slovakia
- Height: 6 ft 2 in (188 cm)
- Weight: 187 lb (85 kg; 13 st 5 lb)
- Position: Centre
- Shoots: Left
- Played for: MHC Martin; HC Slovan Bratislava; HC Košice; MsHK Žilina; ŠHK 37 Piešťany; Telford Tigers; Sheffield Steeldogs
- Playing career: 2012–present

Milan Kolena (born May 12, 1994) is a Slovak ice hockey centre. He most recently played for the Sheffield Steeldogs of the National Ice Hockey League in the United Kingdom.

Kolena previously played nine games in the Kontinental Hockey League for HC Slovan Bratislava and also played in the Slovak Extraliga for MHC Martin, HC Košice, MsHK Žilina and ŠHK 37 Piešťany.

He moved to the United Kingdom in 2016, signing for the Telford Tigers.

== Career statistics ==
=== International ===
Year	Team	Event	GP	G	A	Pts	PIM
2012	Slovakia	U18 D1A	5	3	5	8	2
2013	Slovakia	WJC	6	0	3	3	2
2014	Slovakia	WJC	5	4	4	8	6
WJC totals			11	4	7	11	8
