= Saku Mäenalanen =

Finnish ice hockey player (born 1994)

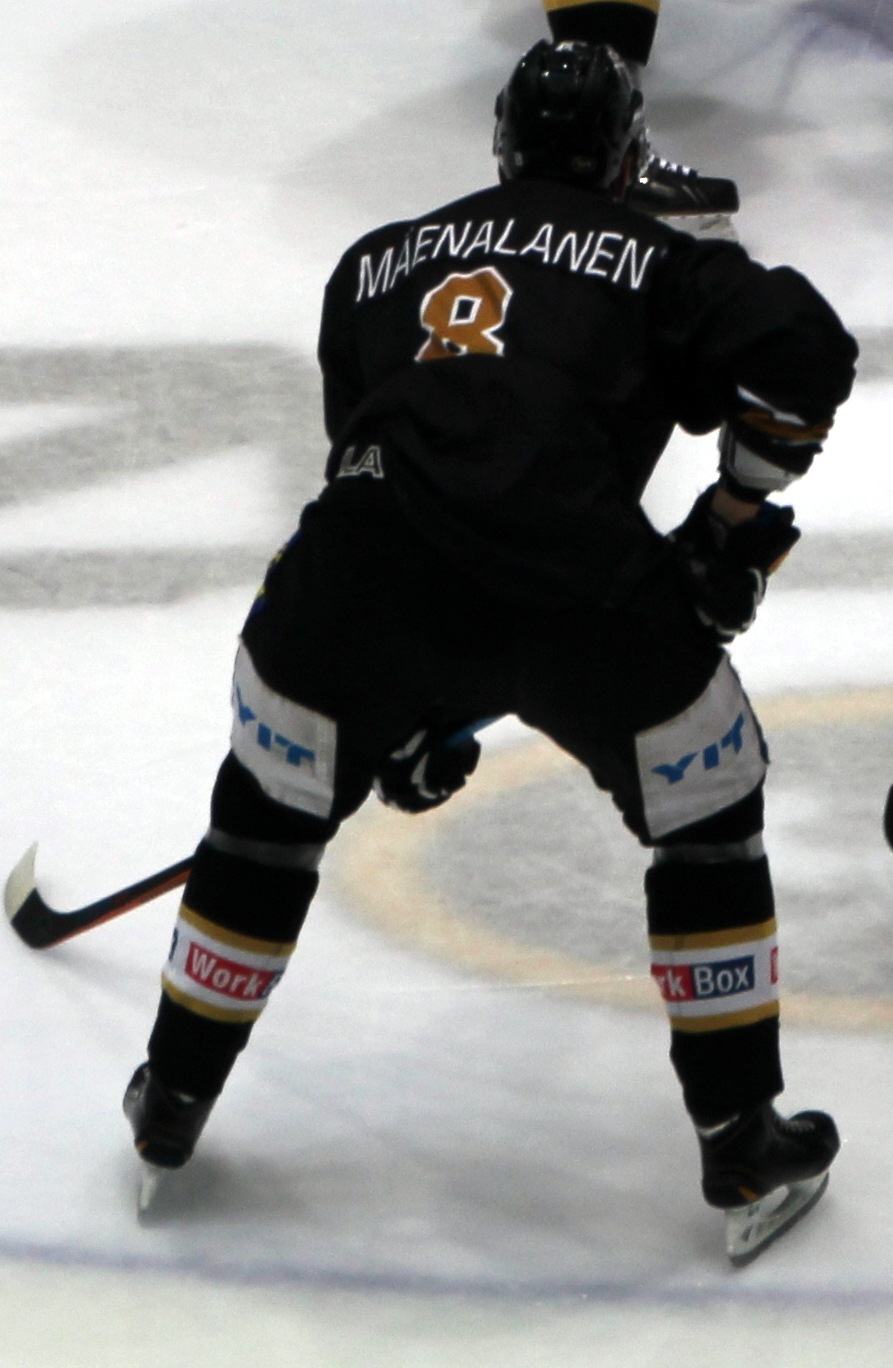
- Mäenalanen with Oulun Kärpät in 2014
- Born: 29 May 1994 (age 32) Tornio, Finland
- Height: 6 ft 4 in (193 cm)
- Weight: 192 lb (87 kg; 13 st 10 lb)
- Position: Forward
- Shoots: Left
- NL team Former teams: SCL Tigers; Oulun Kärpät; Lahti Pelicans; Carolina Hurricanes; Jokerit; Winnipeg Jets
- National team: Finland
- NHL draft: 125th overall, 2013; Nashville Predators
- Playing career: 2013–present

Saku Mäenalanen (born 29 May 1994) is a Finnish professional ice hockey player who is a forward for the SCL Tigers of the National League (NL). Mäenalanen was selected by the Nashville Predators in the fifth round (125th overall) of the 2013 NHL entry draft.

== Playing career ==
Mäenalanen played junior hockey within the Oulun Kärpät organization. Following his selection in the NHL draft by the Predators, he made his professional debut in the Liiga with Oulun Kärpät during the 2013–14 season.

Unsigned by the Nashville Predators, Mäenalanen continued in the Liiga with Oulun Kärpät, also enduring a shortened loan stint with fellow Liiga club, Lahti Pelicans in the 2014–15 season.

In the 2017–18 season, Mäenalanen enjoyed a breakout season totaling 17 goals and 46 points in 59 games, ranking 11th among scorers in Liiga. He added 10 points postseason, helping Oulun capture the league championship. On 18 May 2018, Mäenalanen gained NHL interest and signed a one-year, two-way contract with the Carolina Hurricanes. In signing with the Hurricanes, he was reunited with former Finnish junior teammate, Sebastian Aho.

Mäenalanen began the 2018–19 season with the Hurricanes American Hockey League affiliate, the Charlotte Checkers. He was recalled to the NHL on 6 December after playing in 23 games and recording 11 points for the Checkers. He made his NHL debut the following day in a 4–1 win over the Anaheim Ducks. He recorded his first NHL goal on 8 January in a 4–3 win over the New York Islanders.

As a restricted free agent after his first North American season, Mäenalanen could not agree to terms with the Hurricanes on a new contract. With his rights still held by the Hurricanes, Mäenalanen opted to return to his native Finland to resume his career in the KHL. He agreed to an optional two-year contract with Jokerit on 25 September 2019.

After two seasons with Jokerit, Mäenalanen returned to his original Finnish club, Oulun Kärpät of the Liiga, agreeing to a three-year contract on 11 June 2021. In his first season back with Kärpät in 2021–22, Mäenalanen led the team in scoring with 13 goals and 28 assists for 41 points in 47 games.

On 19 July 2022, Mäenalanen enacted an NHL opt-out clause in the off-season by signing a one-year, two-way contract with the Winnipeg Jets. Mäenalanen successfully made the Jets opening night roster out of training camp to open the 2022–23 season. Used predominately in a fourth-line defensive forward role, Mäenalanen appeared in an NHL career best 64 regular season games and added 4 goals and 10 points. He contributed with 1 assist through 5 playoff games in a first-round defeat to the Vegas Golden Knights.

As a free agent from the Jets in the following off-season, Mäenalanen was unable to secure an NHL contract over the summer. He was later signed to a professional tryout contract by the Colorado Avalanche, however failed the physical at training camp and was subsequently released on 20 September 2023.

The following day from his release, Mäenalanen returned to continue his career in Europe, agreeing to a three-year contract with Swiss club, SCL Tigers of the NL, on 21 September 2023.

== International play ==
Medal record

Representing Finland

Ice hockey

Olympic Games
| Gold medal – first place | 2022 Beijing | |

World Championships
| Gold medal – first place | 2022 Finland | |
| Gold medal – first place | 2026 Switzerland | |
| Silver medal – second place | 2021 Latvia | |

World Junior Championships
| Gold medal – first place | 2014 Malmö | |

Maenalanen made his senior debut for Finland at the 2018 IIHF World Championship. In a fifth-place finish, he posted two goals and three assists in 8 contests.

== Career statistics ==
=== Regular season and playoffs ===
| | | | Regular season | | | | | Playoffs |
| Season | Team | League | GP | G | A | Pts | PIM | GP | G | A | Pts | PIM |
|---|---|---|---|---|---|---|---|---|---|---|---|---|
| 2010–11 | Kiekko–Laser | FIN.3 U18 Q | 8 | 14 | 12 | 26 | 10 | — | — | — | — | — |
| 2010–11 | Kiekko–Laser | FIN.3 U18 | 18 | 13 | 26 | 39 | 10 | — | — | — | — | — |
| 2010–11 | Kärpät | FIN U18 | 1 | 0 | 0 | 0 | 2 | — | — | — | — | — |
| 2011–12 | Kärpät | FIN U18 Q | 12 | 2 | 7 | 9 | 36 | — | — | — | — | — |
| 2011–12 | Kärpät | FIN U18 | 32 | 13 | 29 | 42 | 40 | 9 | 7 | 3 | 10 | 2 |
| 2012–13 | Kärpät | Jr. A | 45 | 23 | 35 | 58 | 43 | 5 | 5 | 2 | 7 | 18 |
| 2013–14 | Kärpät | Jr. A | 5 | 3 | 3 | 6 | 2 | 12 | 4 | 4 | 8 | 10 |
| 2013–14 | Kärpät | Liiga | 25 | 4 | 3 | 7 | 0 | — | — | — | — | — |
| 2013–14 | Jokipojat | Mestis | 15 | 9 | 6 | 15 | 4 | — | — | — | — | — |
| 2014–15 | Kärpät | Jr. A | 6 | 2 | 6 | 8 | 2 | — | — | — | — | — |
| 2014–15 | Kärpät | Liiga | 20 | 4 | 1 | 5 | 2 | 7 | 0 | 1 | 1 | 0 |
| 2014–15 | Pelicans | Liiga | 8 | 1 | 0 | 1 | 0 | — | — | — | — | — |
| 2014–15 | Hokki | Mestis | 17 | 5 | 8 | 13 | 6 | 10 | 2 | 4 | 6 | 22 |
| 2015–16 | Kärpät | Liiga | 46 | 6 | 10 | 16 | 14 | 13 | 3 | 1 | 4 | 6 |
| 2016–17 | Kärpät | Liiga | 34 | 11 | 10 | 21 | 6 | 2 | 0 | 0 | 0 | 0 |
| 2017–18 | Kärpät | Liiga | 59 | 17 | 29 | 46 | 26 | 18 | 5 | 5 | 10 | 16 |
| 2018–19 | Charlotte Checkers | AHL | 31 | 7 | 7 | 14 | 8 | — | — | — | — | — |
| 2018–19 | Carolina Hurricanes | NHL | 34 | 4 | 4 | 8 | 20 | 9 | 0 | 1 | 1 | 6 |
| 2019–20 | Jokerit | KHL | 26 | 5 | 4 | 9 | 8 | 6 | 2 | 3 | 5 | 6 |
| 2020–21 | Jokerit | KHL | 38 | 4 | 8 | 12 | 48 | 4 | 0 | 0 | 0 | 0 |
| 2021–22 | Kärpät | Liiga | 47 | 13 | 28 | 41 | 67 | 7 | 1 | 0 | 1 | 4 |
| 2022–23 | Winnipeg Jets | NHL | 64 | 4 | 6 | 10 | 16 | 5 | 0 | 1 | 1 | 12 |
| 2023–24 | SCL Tigers | NL | 44 | 11 | 9 | 20 | 40 | — | — | — | — | — |
| 2024–25 | SCL Tigers | NL | 27 | 8 | 10 | 18 | 14 | 9 | 1 | 5 | 6 | 4 |
| 2025–26 | SCL Tigers | NL | 47 | 9 | 21 | 30 | 43 | — | — | — | — | — |
| Liiga totals | | | 239 | 56 | 81 | 137 | 115 | 47 | 9 | 7 | 16 | 26 |
| NHL totals | | | 98 | 8 | 10 | 18 | 36 | 14 | 0 | 2 | 2 | 18 |
| KHL totals | | | 64 | 9 | 12 | 21 | 56 | 10 | 2 | 3 | 5 | 6 |

=== International ===
| Year | Team | Event | Result | GP | G | A | Pts | PIM |
|---|---|---|---|---|---|---|---|---|
| 2014 | Finland | WJC | 1st place, gold medalist(s) | 7 | 7 | 4 | 11 | 0 |
| 2018 | Finland | WC | 5th | 8 | 2 | 1 | 3 | 8 |
| 2021 | Finland | WC | 2nd place, silver medalist(s) | 10 | 1 | 3 | 4 | 0 |
| 2022 | Finland | OG | 1st place, gold medalist(s) | 6 | 0 | 1 | 1 | 2 |
| 2022 | Finland | WC | 1st place, gold medalist(s) | 9 | 2 | 0 | 2 | 29 |
| 2024 | Finland | WC | 8th | 7 | 1 | 1 | 2 | 2 |
| 2026 | Finland | WC | 1st place, gold medalist(s) | 10 | 3 | 2 | 5 | 2 |
| Junior totals | | | | 7 | 7 | 4 | 11 | 0 |
| Senior totals | | | | 50 | 9 | 8 | 17 | 43 |

== Awards and honours ==
| Award | Year |
|---|---|
Jr. A SM-liiga
| All-Star Team | 2012–13 |
Liiga
| Kanada-malja (Oulun Kärpät) | 2018 |
