= Fabio Wagner =

German ice hockey player (born 1995)

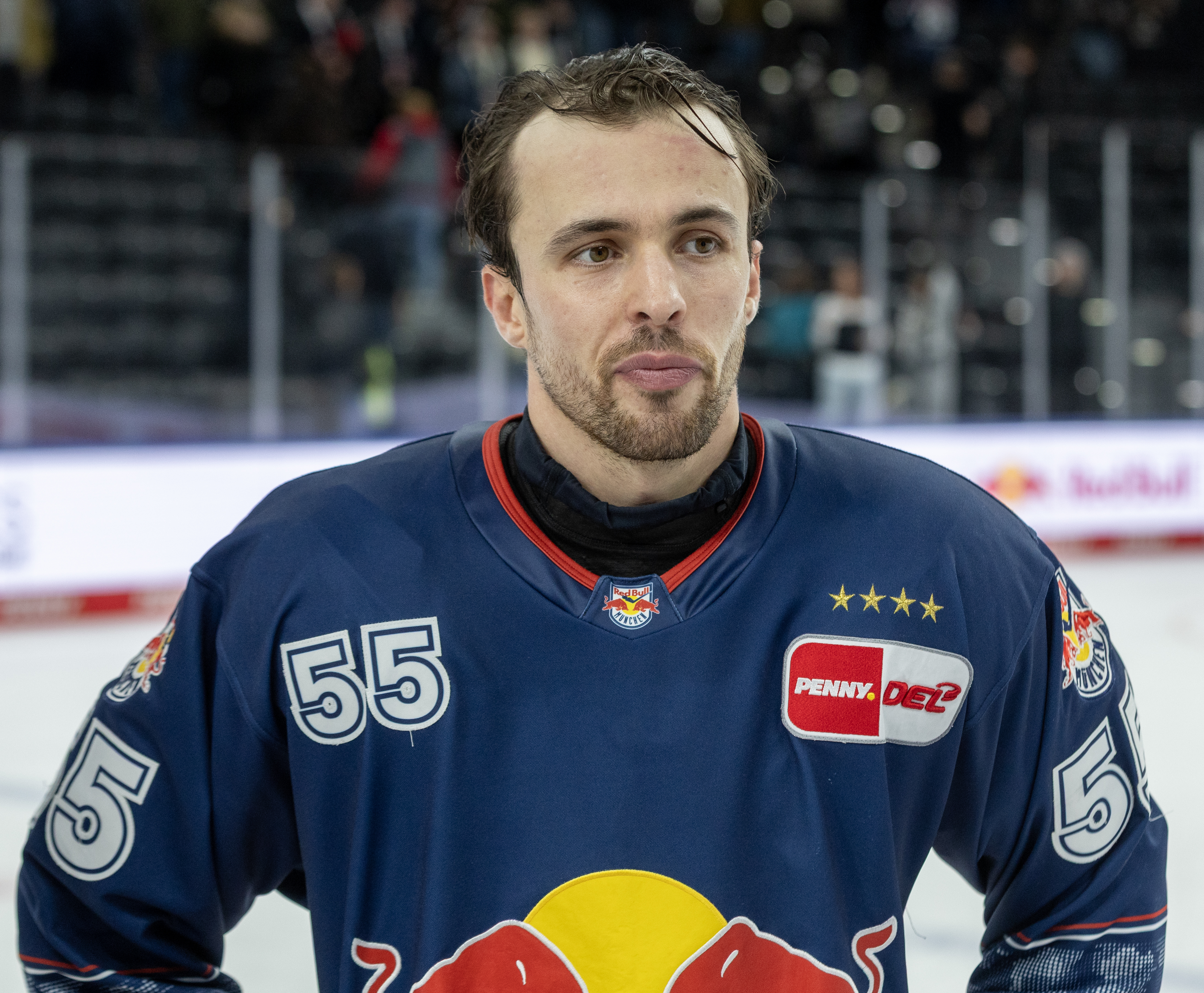
- Wagner in 2025
- Born: 17 September 1995 (age 31) Landshut, Germany
- Height: 1.82 m (6 ft 0 in)
- Weight: 83 kg (183 lb; 13 st 1 lb)
- Position: Defence
- Shoots: Left
- DEL team Former teams: EHC München; ERC Ingolstadt
- National team: Germany
- Playing career: 2013–present

Fabio Wagner (born 17 September 1995) is a German professional ice hockey player who is a defenceman for EHC Red Bull München of the Deutsche Eishockey Liga (DEL).

== International play ==
He represented Germany at the 2021 World Championship.

== Career statistics ==
=== Regular season and playoffs ===
			Regular season					Playoffs
Season	Team	League	GP	G	A	Pts	PIM	GP	G	A	Pts	PIM
2010–11	Landshut Cannibals	DNL	17	1	0	1	6	—	—	—	—	—
2011–12	Landshut Cannibals	DNL	34	0	7	7	91	4	0	0	0	0
2012–13	Landshut Cannibals	DNL	34	6	13	19	40	4	0	1	1	8
2012–13	Landshut Cannibals	2.Gbun	7	0	0	0	31	6	0	0	0	0
2013–14	EVL Landshut Eishockey	DNL	2	0	0	0	4	—	—	—	—	—
2013–14	EVL Landshut Eishockey	DEL2	31	0	3	3	41	14	0	0	0	18
2014–15	ERC Ingolstadt	DEL	24	0	0	0	14	—	—	—	—	—
2014–15	EVL Landshut Eishockey	DEL2	13	0	2	2	6	—	—	—	—	—
2015–16	ERC Ingolstadt	DEL	42	1	1	2	59	2	0	0	0	0
2015–16	ESV Kaufbeuren	DEL2	4	1	1	2	2	—	—	—	—	—
2016–17	ERC Ingolstadt	DEL	47	1	3	4	63	1	0	0	0	16
2016–17	ESV Kaufbeuren	DEL2	1	1	0	1	0	—	—	—	—	—
2017–18	ERC Ingolstadt	DEL	48	1	9	10	41	5	0	1	1	6
2018–19	ERC Ingolstadt	DEL	52	2	8	10	28	4	0	0	0	0
2019–20	ERC Ingolstadt	DEL	49	5	8	13	32	—	—	—	—	—
2020–21	ERC Ingolstadt	DEL	38	2	5	7	14	5	0	2	2	2
2021–22	ERC Ingolstadt	DEL	55	2	15	17	34	2	0	0	0	0
2022–23	ERC Ingolstadt	DEL	56	1	12	13	54	16	2	3	5	10
2023–24	ERC Ingolstadt	DEL	52	0	6	6	36	7	0	2	2	4
2024–25	ERC Ingolstadt	DEL	52	4	9	13	55	12	0	1	1	6
2025–26	EHC München	DEL	52	4	9	13	37	4	0	1	1	29
DEL totals			567	23	85	108	467	58	2	10	12	73

Medal record

Representing Germany

Ice hockey

World Championships
Silver medal – second place	2023 Finland/Latvia	

=== International ===
Year	Team	Event	Result	GP	G	A	Pts	PIM
2012	Germany	U17	9th	5	1	0	1	4
2013	Germany	WJC18	8th	5	1	0	1	4
2014	Germany	WJC	9th	7	0	2	2	4
2015	Germany	WJC	10th	4	0	0	0	0
2021	Germany	WC	4th	10	0	0	0	0
2022	Germany	OG	10th	4	0	0	0	2
2022	Germany	WC	7th	8	0	1	1	4
2023	Germany	WC	2nd place, silver medalist(s)	10	0	0	0	0
2024	Germany	WC	6th	7	0	0	0	6
2025	Germany	WC	9th	7	0	2	2	2
2026	Germany	OG	6th	5	0	1	1	0
2026	Germany	WC	10th	7	1	0	1	0
Junior totals				21	2	2	4	12
Senior totals				58	1	4	5	14
