= Vadim Khlopotov =

Russian ice hockey player

- Born: April 22, 1994 (age 30); Nizhny Tagil, Russia
- Height: 6 ft 0 in (183 cm)
- Weight: 194 lb (88 kg; 13 st 12 lb)
- Position: Forward
- Shoots: Left
- VHL team Former teams: Saryarka Karaganda; Lokomotiv Yaroslavl; Atlant Moscow Oblast; CSKA Moscow; Sibir Novosibirsk; HC Sochi
- NHL draft: Undrafted
- Playing career: 2012–present

Medal record

Representing Russia

Ice hockey

World Junior Championships
| Bronze medal – third place | 2014 Sweden | |

Vadim Anatolevich Khlopotov (Russian: Вадим Анатольевич Хлопотов; born April 22, 1994) is a Russian professional ice hockey player. He is currently playing with Saryarka Karaganda of the Supreme Hockey League (VHL).

In season 2011–12, he was trying himself in Ontario Hockey League where he played for Saginaw Spirit. Vadim Khlopotov played 52 games of the season in which he scored 2 goals and 6 assists, had 24 penalty minutes and -20, according to the +/- system. His Kontinental Hockey League (KHL) debut was playing with Lokomotiv Yaroslavl during the 2013–14 KHL season.
