= Claude-Curdin Paschoud =

Swiss ice hockey player

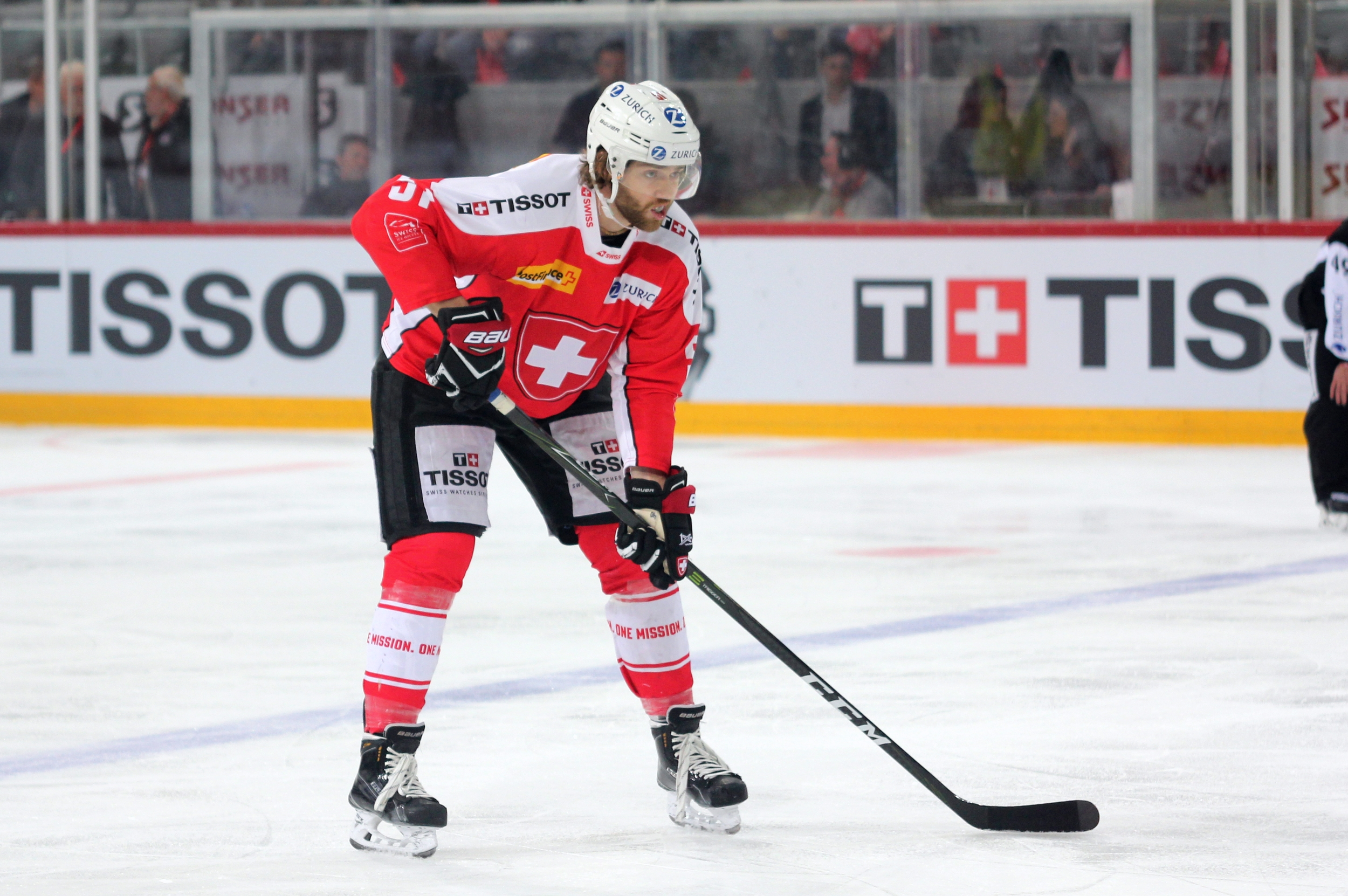
- Born: April 3, 1994 (age 31); Davos, Switzerland
- Height: 6 ft 4 in (193 cm)
- Weight: 205 lb (93 kg; 14 st 9 lb)
- Position: Defence
- Shoots: Left
- NL team: HC Davos
- Playing career: 2013–present

Claude-Curdin Paschoud (born April 3, 1994) is a Swiss professional ice hockey defenceman for HC Davos in the Swiss National League (NL).

== Career statistics ==
=== Regular season and playoffs ===
			Regular season					Playoffs
Season	Team	League	GP	G	A	Pts	PIM	GP	G	A	Pts	PIM
2012–13	HC Davos	NLA	2	0	0	0	0	—	—	—	—	—
2013–14	HC Davos	NLA	27	0	3	3	0	—	—	—	—	—
2014–15	HC Davos	NLA	50	1	8	9	6	15	1	3	4	4
2015–16	HC Davos	NLA	50	0	8	8	12	9	0	0	0	4
2016–17	HC Davos	NLA	50	2	8	10	20	10	0	3	3	2
2017–18	HC Davos	NL	50	0	2	2	22	6	0	1	1	0
2018–19	HC Davos	NL	19	1	1	2	16	—	—	—	—	—
2019–20	HC Davos	NL	22	1	3	4	4	—	—	—	—	—
2020–21	HC Davos	NL	12	0	3	3	6	—	—	—	—	—
2021–22	HC Davos	NL	—	—	—	—	—	3	0	0	0	0
NL totals			282	5	36	41	86	43	1	7	8	10

=== International ===
Year	Team	Event	Result	GP	G	A	Pts	PIM
2011	Switzerland	IH18	7th	4	0	1	1	2
2014	Switzerland	WJC	7th	5	1	0	1	0
Junior totals				9	1	1	2	2
