= Joni Nikko =

Finnish ice hockey player

- Born: 31 May 1994 (age 30); Vaasa, Finland
- Height: 6 ft 2 in (188 cm)
- Weight: 191 lb (87 kg; 13 st 9 lb)
- Position: Left wing
- Shoots: Left
- Div.2 team Former teams: Boro/Vetlanda HC; Lukko; KalPa; SaiPa; Sport
- Playing career: 2011–present

Joni Nikko (born 31 May 1994) is a Finnish professional ice hockey player. His latest team was Brödernas/Väsby in the Swedish Hockeyettan (Div.1).

Nikko made his Liiga debut playing with Lukko during the 2011–12 SM-liiga season. He has also featured with KalPa, SaiPa, and Vaasan Sport in the top tier.
