= Vojtěch Tomeček =

Czech ice hockey player

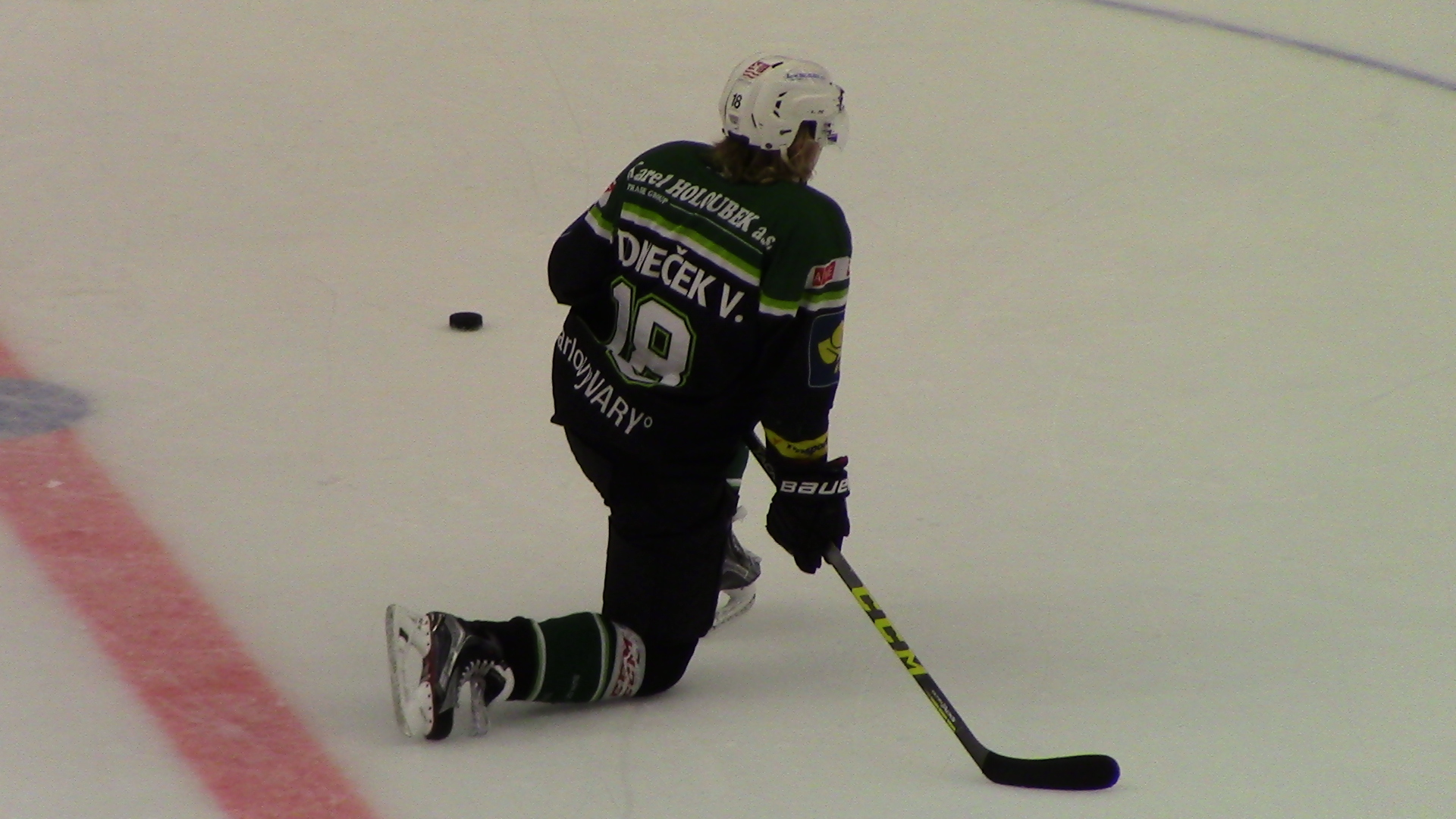
- Vojtěch Tomeček in a live hockey match
- Born: August 12, 1994 (age 31) Karlovy Vary, Czech Republic
- Height: 6 ft 0 in (183 cm)
- Weight: 192 lb (87 kg; 13 st 10 lb)
- Position: Right wing
- Shoots: Right
- ELH team Former teams: HC Olomouc; HC Karlovy Vary; Piráti Chomutov
- National team: Czech Republic
- Playing career: 2013–present

Vojtěch Tomeček (born August 12, 1994) is a Czech professional ice hockey player. He is currently playing for HC Olomouc of the Czech Extraliga.

Tomeček made his Czech Extraliga debut playing with HC Karlovy Vary during the 2013–14 Czech Extraliga season.
