= Michal Plutnar =

Czech ice hockey player

- Born: February 21, 1994 (age 31); Chotěboř, Czech Republic
- Height: 5 ft 10 in (178 cm)
- Weight: 190 lb (86 kg; 13 st 8 lb)
- Position: Defence
- Shoots: Left
- Czech team: HC Bílí Tygři Liberec
- Playing career: 2013–present

Michal Plutnar (born February 21, 1994) is a Czech professional ice hockey player. He is currently playing for HC Bílí Tygři Liberec of the Czech Extraliga.

Plutnar made his Czech Extraliga debut playing with HC Bílí Tygři Liberec during the 2014-15 Czech Extraliga season.
