= Joachim Svendsen =

Norwegian ice hockey player

- Born: 16 October 1994 (age 30); Oslo, Norway
- Height: 6 ft 0 in (183 cm)
- Weight: 183 lb (83 kg; 13 st 1 lb)
- Position: Goaltender
- Catches: Left
- GET team Former teams: Vålerenga Ishockey; Lørenskog IK; Manglerud Star; Bergen IK; Hasle-Løren IL
- NHL draft: Undrafted
- Playing career: 2011–present

Joachim Svendsen (born October 16, 1994) is a Norwegian ice hockey goaltender who is currently playing with Vålerenga in the Norwegian GET-ligaen.
