= Vyacheslav Osnovin =

Russian ice hockey player (born 1994)

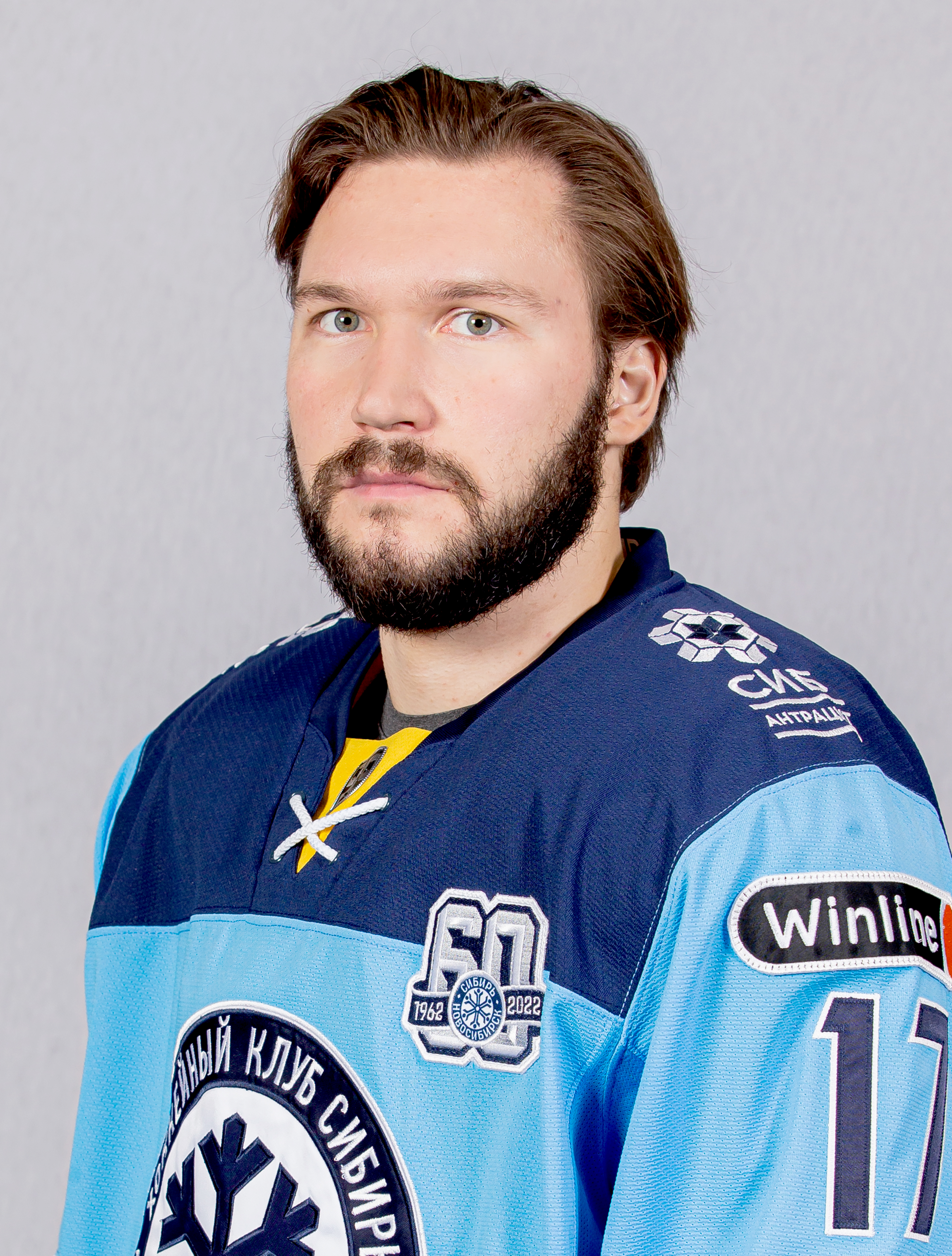
- Born: 5 March 1994 (age 32) Chelyabinsk, Russia
- Height: 6 ft 0 in (183 cm)
- Weight: 198 lb (90 kg; 14 st 2 lb)
- Position: Centre
- Shoots: Left
- KHL team Former teams: Free agent Traktor Chelyabinsk; CSKA Moscow; Sibir Novosibirsk; Salavat Yulaev Ufa; Ak Bars Kazan; Dinamo Minsk; Admiral Vladivostok; Lada Togliatti
- Playing career: 2012–present

Vyacheslav Osnovin (born 5 March 1994) is a Russian professional ice hockey center. He is currently an unrestricted free agent. He most recently played with Admiral Vladivostok of the Kontinental Hockey League (KHL).

== Playing career ==
He made his KHL debut playing with Traktor Chelyabinsk during the 2012–13 KHL season. On November 30, 2018, Vyacheslav Osnovin along with Savely Kuvardin and Alexander Lyakhov were traded to Ak Bars Kazan for Alexander Burmistrov from Salavat Yulaev.

After a lone season with Admiral Vladivostok, Osnovin continued his tenure in the KHL by signing a one-year contract with Lada Togliatti for the 2025–26 season on 7 June 2025. Osnovin made just 3 appearances with Lada before returning to Vladivostok on 24 September 2025.
