= Saku Kinnunen =

Finnish ice hockey player

- Born: January 3, 1995 (age 30); Kuhmo, Finland
- Height: 5 ft 9 in (175 cm)
- Weight: 168 lb (76 kg; 12 st 0 lb)
- Position: Forward
- Shoots: Left
- Hockeyallsvenskan team Former teams: Västerviks IK; IPK
- NHL draft: Undrafted
- Playing career: 2013–present

Saku Kinnunen (born January 3, 1995) is a Finnish ice hockey player. He is currently playing with Västerviks IK in the Finnish Hockeyallsvenskan.

Kinnunen made his Liiga debut playing with KalPa during the 2013–14 Liiga season.
