= 2011 World Junior A Challenge =

Tournament details
- Host country: Canada
- Venue: Langley Events Centre in Langley, British Columbia
- Dates: November 7, 2011 – November 13, 2011
- Teams: 6

Final positions
- Champions: Canada West (3rd title)
- Runners-up: Canada East
- Third place: United States
- Fourth place: Sweden

Tournament statistics
- Games played: 13
- Scoring leader: (United States) Sean Kuraly (6 pts.)

Awards
- MVP: (Canada) Devin Shore

The 2011 World Junior A Challenge was an international Junior "A" ice hockey tournament organized by Hockey Canada. It was hosted in Langley, British Columbia, from November 7–13, 2011, at the Langley Events Centre. The event included the 7th annual Canadian Junior Hockey League Prospects Game Challenge, marking the first time the two events had been paired together.

== Teams ==
- Canada East (6th Appearance)
- Canada West (6th Appearance, 5th as Hosts)
- Russia (6th Appearance)
- Sweden (3rd Appearance)
- United States (5th Appearance)
- Czech Republic (1st Appearance)

== Background ==
Canada East, Canada West, Russia, Sweden and the United States returned, while the Czech Republic replaces Switzerland. Canada East comprised Canadian players from the Northern Ontario, Ontario, Central Canada, Quebec, and Maritime Junior A Leagues, while Canada West comprised Canadian players from the British Columbia, Alberta, Saskatchewan, Manitoba, and Superior International Junior A Leagues. The United States, with players from the United States Hockey League, aimed for a record fourth-straight WJAC victory.

== Exhibition schedule ==
Exhibition Results
Game	Away team	Score	Home team	Score	Notes	Date – Time – Location
Ex1	Canada West	1	Canada East	3	Final - Shots: 23-21 CANE	November 3, 2011 - 19:00 PST - Langley, BC
Ex2	Sweden	8	Czech Republic	2	Final - Shots: 34-24 SWE	November 5, 2011 - 14:00 PST - Langley, BC
Ex3	Canada East	1	United States	4	Final - Shots: 33-30 CANE	November 5, 2011 - 15:30 PST - North Delta, BC
Ex4	Canada West	1	Russia	2	Final - Shots: 53-21 CANW	November 5, 2011 - 19:00 PST - Chilliwack, BC

== 2011 Tournament ==
=== Group A ===
Pos	Team	Pld	W	OTW	OTL	L	GF	GA	GD	Pts
1	Sweden	2	2	0	0	0	3	0	+3	4
2	United States	2	1	0	0	1	6	2	+4	2
3	Canada West	2	0	0	0	2	1	8	−7	0

=== Group B ===
Pos	Team	Pld	W	OTW	OTL	L	GF	GA	GD	Pts
1	Canada East	2	1	0	1	0	7	3	+4	3
2	Czech Republic	2	1	0	0	1	4	8	−4	2
3	Russia	2	0	1	0	1	6	6	0	2

=== Results ===
Round-robin results
Game	Pool	Away team	Score	Home team	Score	Notes	Date – Time – Location
1	B	Canada East	5	Czech Republic	0	Final - Shots: 32-16 CANE	November 7, 2011 - 16:00 PST - Langley, BC
2	A	United States	0	Sweden	1	Final - Shots: 44-24 USA	November 7, 2011 - 19:30 PST - Langley, BC
3	B	Czech Republic	4	Russia	3	Final - Shots: 43-31 RUS	November 8, 2011 - 16:00 PST - Langley, BC
4	A	Sweden	2	Canada West	0	Final - Shots: 38-29 CANW	November 8, 2011 - 19:30 PST - Langley, BC
5	B	Russia	3	Canada East	2	SO Final - Shots: 49-30 CANE	November 9, 2011 - 16:00 PST - Langley, BC
6	A	Canada West	1	United States	6	Final - Shots: 34-30 USA	November 9, 2011 - 19:30 PST - Langley, BC

=== Championship Round ===
Championship Results
Game	Away team	Score	Home team	Score	Notes	Date – Time – Location
QF	Russia	3	United States	6	Final - Shots: 56-29 USA	November 10, 2011 - 16:00 PST - Langley, BC
QF	Canada West	4	Czech Republic	1	Final - Shots: 35-21 CANW	November 10, 2011 - 19:30 PST - Langley, BC
SF	United States	2	Canada East	4	Final - Shots: 28-23 CANE	November 11, 2011 - 16:00 PST - Langley, BC
SF	Canada West	2	Sweden	1	OT Final - Shots: 29-24 SWE	November 11, 2011 - 19:30 PST - Langley, BC
5th	Russia	3	Czech Republic	2	Final - Shots: 34-32 CZE	November 12, 2011 - 12:00 PST - Langley, BC
3rd	United States	4	Sweden	0	Final - Shots: 33-23 USA	November 12, 2011 - 19:30 PST - Langley, BC
1st	Canada West	4	Canada East	2	Final - Shots: 28-24 CANW	November 13, 2011 - 17:00 PST - Langley, BC

=== Final standings ===
	Team
1st place, gold medalist(s)	Canada West
2nd place, silver medalist(s)	Canada East
3rd place, bronze medalist(s)	United States
4th	Sweden
5th	Russia
6th	Czech Republic

== Statistics ==
=== Scorers ===
Scoring Leaders
Player	Team	GP	G	A	P	PIM
Sean Kuraly	United States	5	3	3	6	8
Devin Shore	Canada East	4	2	4	6	0
Mario Lucia	United States	5	4	1	5	0
Radim Matuš	Czech Republic	4	2	2	4	0
Tyler Spink	Canada East	4	1	3	4	0
Vince Hinostroza	United States	5	1	3	4	4
Randy Gazzola	Canada East	4	3	0	3	0
Aaron Hadley	Canada West	5	3	0	3	2
Bogdan Yakimov	Russia	4	2	1	3	0
Alexander Kerfoot	Canada West	5	2	1	3	2

=== Goaltenders ===
Leading goaltenders
Player	Team	GP	Mins	GA	SO	GAA	Sv%	Record
Zane Gothberg	United States	2	119:55	1	1	0.50	0.979	1–1–0
Oscar Dansk	Sweden	2	122:09	2	1	0.98	0.971	1–0–1
Mathias Israelsson	Sweden	2	120:00	4	1	2.00	0.943	1–1–0
Sean Maguire	Canada West	4	242:09	6	0	1.49	0.942	3–1–0
Andrei Vasilevski	Russia	3	164:14	9	0	3.29	0.926	1–2–0

== Awards ==
Most Valuable Player: Devin Shore (Canada East)

All-Star Team

Forwards: Alexander Kerfoot (Canada West), Mario Lucia (United States), Devin Shore (Canada East)
Defense: Ludvig Byström (Sweden), Kevin Lough (Canada East)
Goalie: Sean Maguire (Canada West)

== Rosters ==
=== Canada East ===
(Canada) Players: Jason Pucciarelli, Adrian Ignagni, MacKenzie Weegar, Paul Geiger, Aidan Wright, Phil Hampton, Ben Hutton, Kevin Lough, Randy Gazzola, Daniel Milne, Kyle Dutra, David Friedmann, Tylor Spink, Patrick Megannety, Tyson Spink, Braedan Russell, Justin Danforth, Michael Neville, Drake Caggiula, Devin Shore, Jeff DiNallo, Daniel Leavens

Staff: Curtis Hodgins, Jason Nobili, Greg Walters, Pierre Menard, Robb Crawford, Amanda Gilroy, Derek Blais

=== Canada West ===
(Canada) Players: Tyler Briggs, Sean Maguire, Troy Stecher, Luke Juha, Sam Jardine, Brett Corkey, Reece Willcox, Rhett Holland, Colton Parayko, Carson Cooper, Connor Hoekstra, Alexander Kerfoot, Aaron Hadley, Brandon Morley, Riley Kieser, Peter Quenneville, Wesley Myron, Michael Stenerson, Evan Richardson, Curtis Loik, Jujhar Khaira, Travis St. Denis

Staff: Kent Lewis, Andrew Milne, Dean Brockman, Jeff Battah, Jeff Woods, Erin Berkowski, Shawn Bullock

=== Russia ===
(Russia) Players: Igor Ustinski, Ivan Nalimov, Andrei Vasilevski, Andrei Ermakov, Stanislav Garyeyev, Ilya Lyubushkin, Valeri Vasiliev, Egor Malenkikh, Damir Galin, Nikita Lisov, Damir Musin, Arseni Erokhin, Arseni Khatsei, Bogdan Yakimov, Alexei Filippov, Ivan Petrakov, Anatoli Ryabov, Alexei Kudreman, Ilya Yamkin, Leonid Avtomov, Vyacheslav Osnovin, Damir Zhafyarov, Daniil Yunyshev, Alexander Timirev, Alexander Barabanov, Valentin Zykov, Valeri Nichushkin

Staff: Andrei Parfenov, Igor Semenov, Ruslan Suleymanov, Sergey Fedotov, Oleg Norchenko

=== Sweden ===
(Sweden) Players: Oscar Dansk, Mathias Israelsson, Robert Hägg, Ludvig Byström, Calle Andersson, Linus Arnesson, Jesper Pettersson, Tommy Stenqvist, Hampus Lindholm, Frederic Anderberg, Jesper Fröden, Tobias Törnkvist, Mattias Kalin, Ludvig Nilsson, Anton Brehmer, Victor Gustavsson, Jacob de la Rose, Gustav Possler, Filip Sandberg, Elias Lindholm, Erik Karlsson, Alexander Wennberg

Staff: Rikard Gronborg, Anders Johansson, Nizze Landén, Adam Andersson, Mikael Persson, Frederik Carls, Jan Johansson

=== Czech Republic ===
(Czech Republic) Players: Patrik Polívka, Marek Langhamer, Vojtěch Zadražil, Lukáš Buchta, Jan Košťálek, Ronald Knot, Adam Hawlik, Karel Plašil, Štěpán Jeník, Pavel Sedláček, Martin Matejček, Ondřej Slováček, Petr Koblasa, Michal Švihálek, Matěj Zadražil, Martin Procházka, Euvstathio Soumelidis, Dominik Simon, Vojtěch Tomeček, Jan Hudeček, Tomáš Rousek, Tomáš Franek

Staff: Jakub Petr, Jiří Veber, Klas Ostman, Marek Novotný, Jaroslav Brabec, Daniel Waciakowski

=== United States ===
(United States) Players: Ryan McKay, Zane Gothberg, Chris Bradley, Brian Cooper, Ian McCoshen, Ethan Prow, Mike Reilly, Jordan Schmaltz, Andy Welinski, Riley Bourbonnais, Alex Broadhurst, Tony Cameranesi, Austin Cangelosi, Sam Herr, Vince Hinostroza, Kevin Irwin, Sean Kuraly, Mario Lucia, A. J. Michaelson, Brett Patterson, Ray Pigozzi, Austyn Young

Staff: Regg Simon, Shane Fukushima, Bliss Littler, Darrin Flinchem, Todd Klein, Dr. Alan Ashare, Marc Boxer

== CJHL Prospects Game ==

For the first time in its history, the Canadian Junior Hockey League Prospects Game was a part of the WJAC festivities. Just like the previous two Prospects Games, the event is actually two "prospect" games with the President's Cup going to the winning goal aggregate.

=== Summary ===
==== Game One ====
West Prospects' Adam Tambellini scored a rebound goal in overtime on East's Brock Crossthwaite to give the West the come-from-behind victory. Despite being outshot 44-30 by the East, the West goes into Game Two with a one-goal lead in the goal-aggregate two-game series.

==== Game Two ====
Again, the West Prospects come back from a deficit (3–2 midway through the game) with a tying goal from Sean McGovern late in the second, Justin Lund scored the winning goal only 28 seconds into the third, and Chase McMurphy scored the insurance marker only 61 seconds later to clinch game two of the Prospects Games. The 5–3 victory gave the West a 9–6 aggregate victory over the East for the series and their fourth Presidents Cup in 7 years.

=== Results ===
Exhibition Results
Game	Away team	Score	Home team	Score	Notes	Date – Time – Location
1	East Prospects	3	West Prospects	4	OT Final - Shots: 44-30 East	November 12, 2011 – 16:00 PST – Langley, BC
2	East Prospects	3	West Prospects	5	Final - Shots: 31-28 West	November 13, 2011 – 12:00 PST – Langley, BC

=== Rosters ===
==== East Prospects ====
Players: Simon Lemieux, Brock Crossthwaite, Zachary Borsoi, James De Haas, Chad Duchesne, Fraser Turner, Patrick Piacentini, Mitch Eden, Patrick McCarron, Deric Boudreau, Stephen Anderson, Dalen Hedges, Jordan Delaurier, Joe Sullivan, Chris King, Ben Dalpe, Ross Johnston, Dany Boyer, Cooper Richards, Matt Buckles

Staff: Sheldon Keefe, Dave Campbell

==== West Prospects ====
Players: Dawson MacAuley, Matt Tomkins, David Iacono, Devon Toews, Tyler Mueller, Tanner Jago, Braxton Bilous, Brendan Dusik, T. J. Reeve, Adam Tambellini, Ryan Berlin, Austin Plevy, Corey Petrash, Jared Iron, Sean McGovern, Wade Murphy, Morgan Zulinick, Justin Lund, Chase McMurphy, Jordan Larson

Staff: Jason McKee, Gord Cochrane
