= Israelsson =

Israelsson is a surname. Notable people with the surname include:

- Erik Israelsson (born 1989), Swedish association footballer
- Fet-Mats Israelsson (died 1677), "petrified man" found in 1719
- Karl-Erik Israelsson (1929–2013), Swedish long jumper
- Margareta Israelsson (born 1954), Swedish Social Democratic politician
- Mathias Israelsson (born 1994), Swedish ice hockey goaltender
- Sven Israelsson (1920–1989), Swedish Nordic combined skier who competed in the late 1940s

== See also ==
- Israel's Son
