= Devin Shore =

Canadian ice hockey player (born 1994)

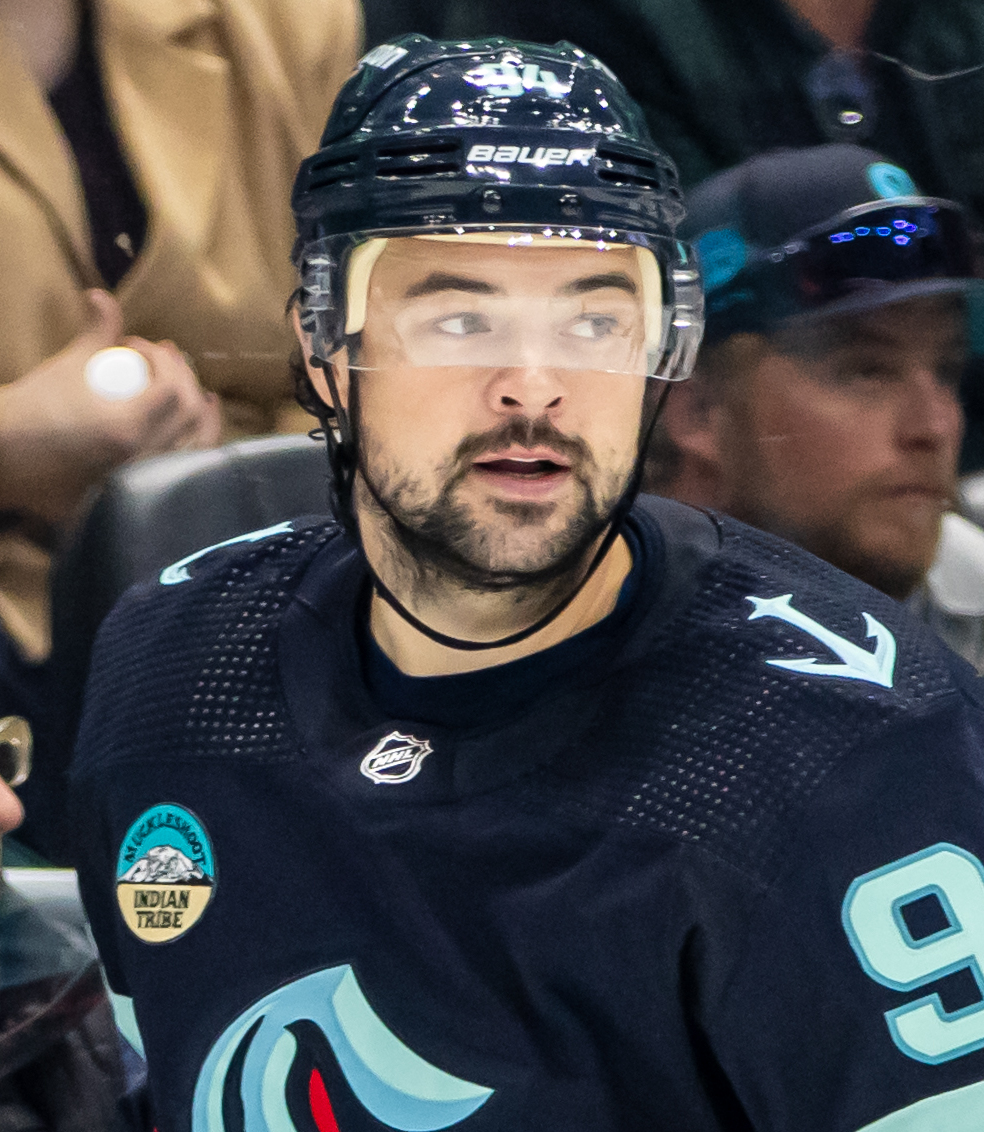
- Shore with the Seattle Kraken in 2023
- Born: July 19, 1994 (age 32) Ajax, Ontario, Canada
- Height: 6 ft 1 in (185 cm)
- Weight: 205 lb (93 kg; 14 st 9 lb)
- Position: Centre
- Shoots: Left
- ELH team Former teams: HC Sparta Praha; Dallas Stars; Anaheim Ducks; Columbus Blue Jackets; Edmonton Oilers; Seattle Kraken; Minnesota Wild
- NHL draft: 61st overall, 2012; Dallas Stars
- Playing career: 2015–present

Devin Shore (born July 19, 1994) is a Canadian professional ice hockey forward for HC Sparta Praha of the Czech Extraliga (ELH). He was selected by the Dallas Stars in the second round (61st overall) of the 2012 NHL entry draft.

== Playing career ==
Shore played for the Archbishop Denis O'Connor (DOC) Chargers high school hockey team in Ajax, Ontario. He attended The Hill Academy.

On May 17, 2011, Shore committed to play NCAA hockey with the Maine Black Bears of the NCAA Men's Division I Hockey East conference.

While majoring in finance, Shore played 38 games for the Maine Black Bears during his freshman season. After the season, Shore was named to the Hockey East Academic All-Star Team and HockeyEast All-Academic Team.

In his second year, Shore played 35 games, leading Maine in scoring with 14 goals and 29 assists for 43 points. Shore's outstanding play was rewarded with a selection to the 2013–14 All-Hockey East First Team. He was also named a Second Team All-American and Maine Scholar-Athlete Award.

On March 17, 2014, Shore was named captain of the Black Bears for the 2014–15 season. Upon completion of his junior season as Captain of the Black Bears in 2014–15 season, Shore ended his collegiate career in agreeing to a three-year entry-level contract with the Dallas Stars on March 10, 2015. He was then signed to an amateur try-out contract with the Stars AHL affiliate in Texas to finish the season.

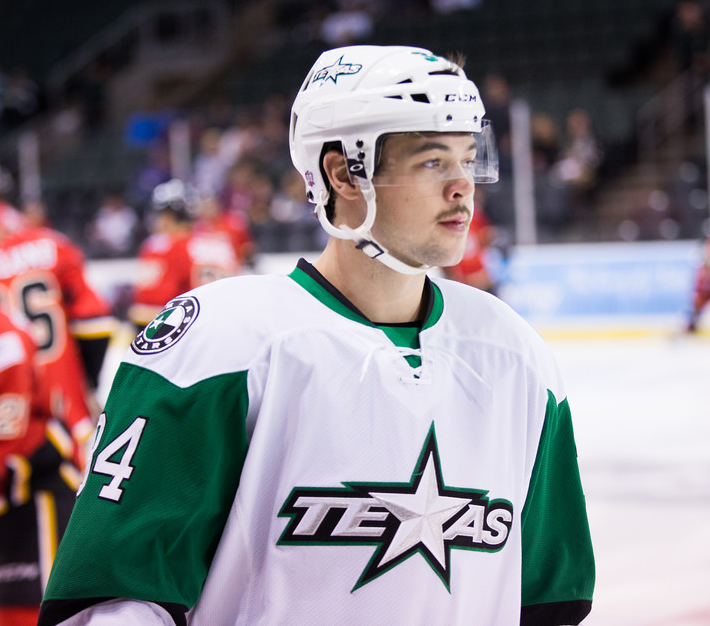
Shore with the Texas Stars in 2015

The Stars assigned Shore during the pre-season to begin the 2015–16 season in Texas. He got off to a quick start in his rookie campaign, as he was selected as the AHL's player of the month in October with 8 goals and 3 assists for 11 points with a plus 7 rating in 9 games. He was placed second in the AHL in goals before he received his first recall to the NHL by the Dallas Stars on November 1, 2015. He made his NHL debut against the Boston Bruins on November 12, 2015.

Shore scored his first NHL goal in a 6–5 loss against the Colorado Avalanche on October 15, 2016.

In his third full season with the Stars in 2018–19, having contributed with 17 points in 42 games, Shore was traded to the Anaheim Ducks in exchange for Andrew Cogliano on January 14, 2019. Shore played out the season with the Ducks, contributing with 12 points in 34 games.

On February 24, 2020, Shore was traded to the Columbus Blue Jackets in exchange for Sonny Milano. He added a goal and assist in 6 games with the Blue Jackets before the season was paused due to the COVID-19 pandemic. On the club's return to play, Shore went scoreless in two post-season games.

As a restricted free agent with the Blue Jackets organization, Shore was not tendered a qualifying offer, releasing him to free agency on October 6, 2020. Approaching training camp unsigned for the delayed 2020–21 season, Shore accepted an invitation to attend the Edmonton Oilers training camp on a professional tryout basis. Upon the conclusion of camp, Shore was signed to a one-year, two-way contract with the Oilers on January 14, 2021, and immediately placed on waivers.

On June 9, 2021, Shore signed a two-year contract extension with the Oilers.

Having left the Oilers as a free agent following three seasons within the club, Shore was signed to a one-year, two-way contract with the Seattle Kraken for the 2023–24 season on August 31, 2023.

On July 1, 2024, Shore signed a one-year, two-way contract with the Minnesota Wild.

As a pending free agent at the conclusion of the 2024–25 season with the Wild, Shore after 10 seasons in the NHL opted to pursue a career abroad in agreeing to a one-year contract with Czech based outfit HC Sparta Praha of the ELH on June 4, 2025.

== Career statistics ==
| | | | Regular season | | | | | Playoffs |
| Season | Team | League | GP | G | A | Pts | PIM | GP | G | A | Pts | PIM |
|---|---|---|---|---|---|---|---|---|---|---|---|---|
| 2009–10 | Ajax/Pickering Raiders AAA | EHL U16 | 68 | 40 | 48 | 88 | 35 | — | — | — | — | — |
| 2010–11 | The Hill Academy | HSON | 61 | 33 | 62 | 95 | 18 | — | — | — | — | — |
| 2011–12 | Whitby Fury | OJHL | 41 | 29 | 29 | 58 | 26 | 23 | 7 | 25 | 32 | 10 |
| 2012–13 | University of Maine | HE | 38 | 6 | 20 | 26 | 10 | — | — | — | — | — |
| 2013–14 | University of Maine | HE | 35 | 14 | 29 | 43 | 38 | — | — | — | — | — |
| 2014–15 | University of Maine | HE | 39 | 14 | 21 | 35 | 20 | — | — | — | — | — |
| 2014–15 | Texas Stars | AHL | 19 | 4 | 2 | 6 | 4 | 3 | 1 | 0 | 1 | 0 |
| 2015–16 | Texas Stars | AHL | 23 | 15 | 11 | 26 | 8 | — | — | — | — | — |
| 2015–16 | Dallas Stars | NHL | 3 | 0 | 0 | 0 | 0 | — | — | — | — | — |
| 2016–17 | Dallas Stars | NHL | 82 | 13 | 20 | 33 | 14 | — | — | — | — | — |
| 2017–18 | Dallas Stars | NHL | 82 | 11 | 21 | 32 | 14 | — | — | — | — | — |
| 2018–19 | Dallas Stars | NHL | 42 | 5 | 12 | 17 | 7 | — | — | — | — | — |
| 2018–19 | Anaheim Ducks | NHL | 34 | 5 | 7 | 12 | 6 | — | — | — | — | — |
| 2019–20 | Anaheim Ducks | NHL | 39 | 4 | 6 | 10 | 8 | — | — | — | — | — |
| 2019–20 | Columbus Blue Jackets | NHL | 6 | 1 | 1 | 2 | 0 | 2 | 0 | 0 | 0 | 0 |
| 2020–21 | Edmonton Oilers | NHL | 38 | 5 | 4 | 9 | 6 | 2 | 0 | 1 | 1 | 0 |
| 2021–22 | Edmonton Oilers | NHL | 49 | 5 | 6 | 11 | 10 | — | — | — | — | — |
| 2022–23 | Edmonton Oilers | NHL | 47 | 1 | 8 | 9 | 4 | — | — | — | — | — |
| 2022–23 | Bakersfield Condors | AHL | 5 | 2 | 3 | 5 | 0 | — | — | — | — | — |
| 2023–24 | Seattle Kraken | NHL | 23 | 1 | 3 | 4 | 4 | — | — | — | — | — |
| 2023–24 | Coachella Valley Firebirds | AHL | 39 | 7 | 18 | 25 | 4 | 18 | 5 | 8 | 13 | 4 |
| 2024–25 | Iowa Wild | AHL | 15 | 2 | 8 | 10 | 6 | — | — | — | — | — |
| 2024–25 | Minnesota Wild | NHL | 55 | 1 | 4 | 5 | 6 | — | — | — | — | — |
| NHL totals | | | 498 | 52 | 92 | 144 | 79 | 4 | 0 | 1 | 1 | 0 |

Medal record

Ice hockey

Representing Canada East

World Junior A Challenge
| Silver medal – second place | 2011 Langley | |

== Awards and honours ==
| Award | Year |
International
| World Junior A Challenge Most Valuable Player | 2011 |
College
| Hockey East All-Academic Team | 2012–13 |
| Hockey East Academic All-Star Team | 2012–13 |
| AHCA East Second-Team All-American | 2013–14 |
| Hockey East First Team | 2013–14 |
| Hockey East All-Academic Team | 2013–14 |
