= Alex Broadhurst =

American professional ice hockey forward

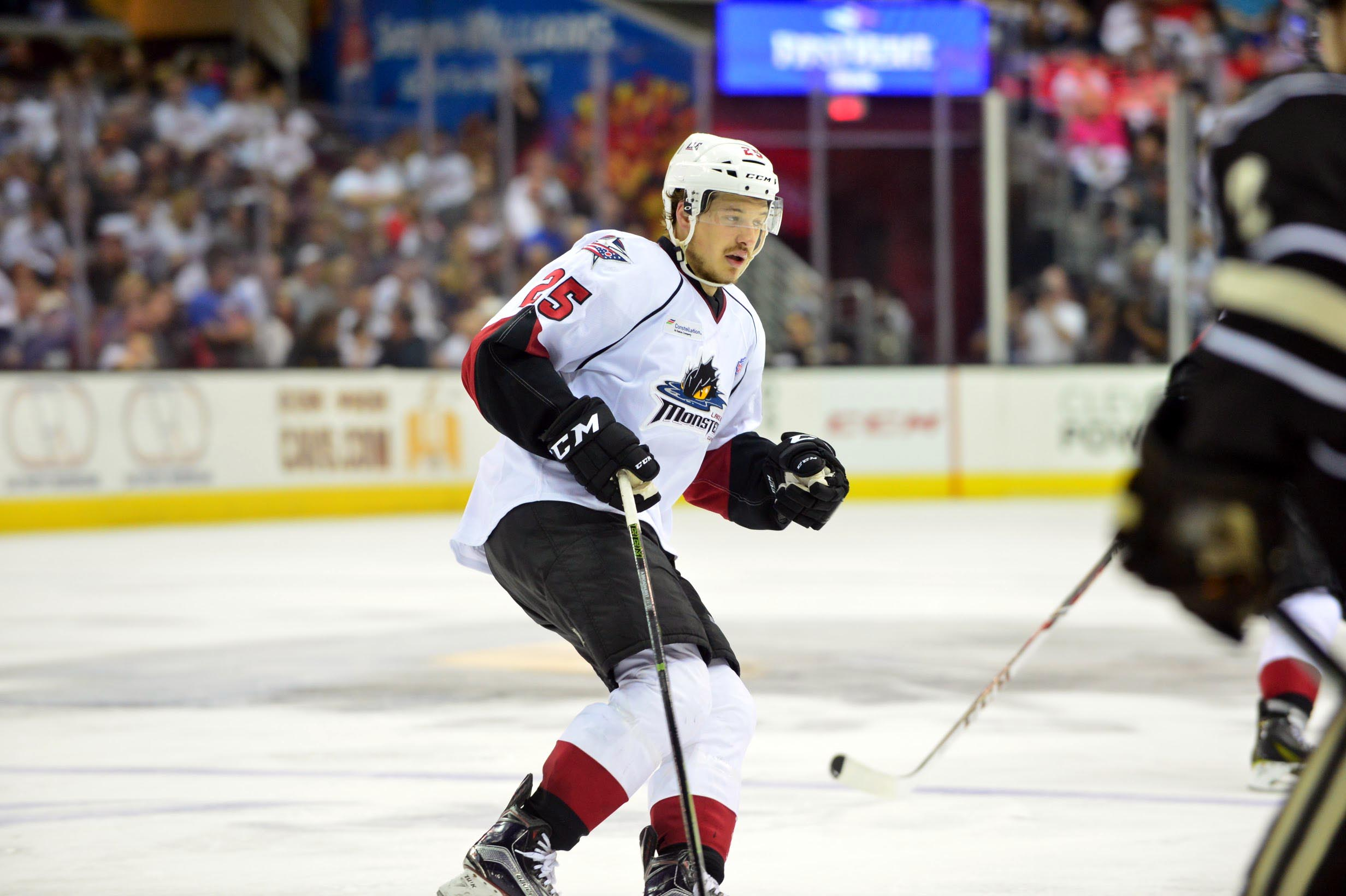
- Broadhurst with the Lake Erie Monsters in 2016
- Born: March 7, 1993 (age 33) Orland Park, Illinois, U.S.
- Height: 6 ft 0 in (183 cm)
- Weight: 178 lb (81 kg; 12 st 10 lb)
- Position: Center
- Shoots: Left
- DEL team Former teams: Fischtown Pinguins; Columbus Blue Jackets; HIFK; Avangard Omsk; Amur Khabarovsk
- NHL draft: 199th overall, 2011; Chicago Blackhawks
- Playing career: 2013–present

Alex Broadhurst (born March 7, 1993) is an American professional ice hockey forward who is currently playing for Fischtown Pinguins in the Deutsche Eishockey Liga (DEL). He has formerly played with the Columbus Blue Jackets of the National Hockey League (NHL).

== Playing career ==
Broadhurst was drafted by the Chicago Blackhawks, 199th overall in the 7th round of the 2011 NHL entry draft. He played two seasons with the Green Bay Gamblers in the United States Hockey League (USHL), and one with the London Knights in the Ontario Hockey League (OHL). In 2012, he led the Gamblers in scoring and was named to the 2011–12 All-USHL First Team. On April 24, 2012, Broadhurst scored a short-handed hat-trick for the Gamblers in its 6–3 win over the Youngstown Phantoms in Game 3 of the USHL Eastern Division semifinal series. It was the first shorthanded hat trick scored in the history of the USHL.

In 2011, he represented the United States at the World Junior A Challenge where the team took third place.

On June 14, 2013, the Blackhawks agreed to terms with Broadhurst for a three-year entry-level contract. In September 2013, he was assigned to the Blackhawks-affiliated Rockford IceHogs.

On June 30, 2015, Broadhurst was included in the trade of Brandon Saad by the Blackhawks to the Columbus Blue Jackets in exchange for Jeremy Morin, Marko Dano, Artem Anisimov, Corey Tropp and a fourth-round draft pick in 2016.

During his third season within the Blue Jackets organization in 2017–18, Broadhurst was recalled by Columbus on April 3, 2018, and made his NHL debut for the Blue Jackets against the Detroit Red Wings. He was scoreless in two games with the Blue Jackets before he was returned to the Monsters.

In the 2018–19 season, while providing a veteran presence with the Cleveland Monsters, on February 25, 2019, Broadhurst was traded by the Blue Jackets to the Winnipeg Jets for future considerations. It was immediately announced that Broadhurst would continue in the AHL with the Monsters on loan from the Jets.

In the off-season, Broadhurst having left the Jets as a free agent, opted to continue his career in the AHL, agreeing to a one-year contract with the San Diego Gulls, affiliate to the Anaheim Ducks, on August 14, 2019. In his lone season with the Gulls in the 2019–20 season, Broadhurst served as an alternate captain and contributed with 9 goals and 24 points in 51 regular season games before the season was cancelled due to the COVID-19 pandemic.

As a free agent, Broadhurst opted to pursue a career abroad, agreeing to a one-year contract with Finnish club, HIFK of the Liiga, on June 28, 2020. Broadhurst remained with HIFK for two years, leaving the club as a free agent after posting 11 goals and 34 points through 41 regular season games in the 2021–22 season.

On June 23, 2022, Broadhurst was signed to a one-year contract to join Russian club, Avangard Omsk of the KHL. In the 2022–23 season, Broadhurst quickly adapted with Avangard, contributing with 14 goals and 30 points through 67 regular season games. He helped the club reach the Conference finals in the post-season, adding 3 goals and 8 points through 14 appearances.

As a free agent, Broadhurst left Avangard Omsk and continued his tenure in the KHL by signing a one-year deal for the 2023–24 season with Amur Khabarovsk on May 15, 2023.

After three seasons in Khabarovsk, Boradhurst left Russia and continued his career abroad by agreeing to a one-year deal with German club, Fisctown Pinguins of the DEL, on July 29, 2026.

== Personal ==
Alex's older brother Terry Broadhurst was also rostered with IceHogs over the 2013–14 season.

== Career statistics ==
=== Regular season and playoffs ===
			Regular season					Playoffs
Season	Team	League	GP	G	A	Pts	PIM	GP	G	A	Pts	PIM
2010–11	Green Bay Gamblers	USHL	55	13	20	33	22	11	3	6	9	4
2011–12	Green Bay Gamblers	USHL	53	26	47	73	40	12	9	9	18	6
2012–13	London Knights	OHL	65	23	40	63	36	21	10	18	28	22
2013–14	Rockford IceHogs	AHL	75	16	29	45	32	—	—	—	—	—
2014–15	Rockford IceHogs	AHL	29	6	8	14	4	7	0	1	1	2
2015–16	Lake Erie Monsters	AHL	60	10	26	36	14	17	3	9	12	6
2016–17	Cleveland Monsters	AHL	52	11	14	25	23	—	—	—	—	—
2017–18	Cleveland Monsters	AHL	66	19	22	41	20	—	—	—	—	—
2017–18	Columbus Blue Jackets	NHL	2	0	0	0	2	—	—	—	—	—
2018–19	Cleveland Monsters	AHL	51	8	22	30	12	8	1	1	2	6
2019–20	San Diego Gulls	AHL	51	9	15	24	8	—	—	—	—	—
2020–21	HIFK	Liiga	45	7	28	35	12	8	0	5	5	2
2021–22	HIFK	Liiga	41	11	23	34	20	7	0	4	4	0
2022–23	Avangard Omsk	KHL	67	14	16	30	20	14	3	5	8	8
2023–24	Amur Khabarovsk	KHL	21	4	4	8	6	3	1	3	4	0
2024–25	Amur Khabarovsk	KHL	62	10	22	32	10	—	—	—	—	—
2025–26	Amur Khabarovsk	KHL	45	8	12	20	10	—	—	—	—	—
NHL totals			2	0	0	0	2	—	—	—	—	—
Liiga totals			86	18	51	69	32	15	0	9	9	2
KHL totals			195	36	54	90	46	17	4	8	12	8

Medal record

Ice hockey

Representing United States

World Junior A Challenge
Bronze medal – third place	2011 Langley	

=== International ===
Year	Team	Event	Result	GP	G	A	Pts	PIM
2011	United States	WJAC	3rd place, bronze medalist(s)	5	2	0	2	4
Junior totals				5	2	0	2	4

== Awards and honors ==
Awards	Year
AHL
Calder Cup (Lake Erie Monsters)	2016
