= Michael Paliotta =

American ice hockey player

- Born: April 6, 1993 (age 33) Westport, Connecticut, U.S.
- Height: 6 ft 3 in (191 cm)
- Weight: 207 lb (94 kg; 14 st 11 lb)
- Position: Defense
- Shot: Right
- Played for: Chicago Blackhawks; Columbus Blue Jackets
- NHL draft: 70th overall, 2011; Chicago Blackhawks
- Playing career: 2015–2020

Michael Paliotta (born April 6, 1993) is an American former professional ice hockey defenseman. Paliotta was selected by the Chicago Blackhawks in the 3rd round (70th overall) of the 2011 NHL entry draft. He played in the National Hockey League (NHL) with the Blackhawks and the Columbus Blue Jackets.

== Playing career ==
As a youth, Paliotta played in the 2006 Quebec International Pee-Wee Hockey Tournament with the New York Rangers minor ice hockey team.

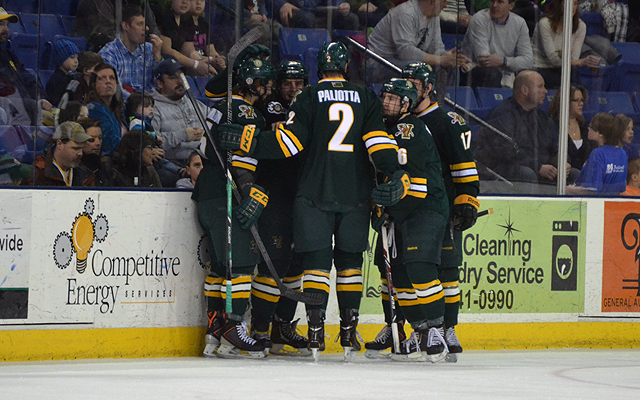
Pallota (center) with Vermont in 2014

On March 26, 2015, the Chicago Blackhawks signed Paliotta to two-year contract, and on April 11, 2015, he made his NHL debut skating against the Colorado Avalanche in the Blackhawks' final game of the 2014–15 regular season. Paliotta was among the Blackhawks training squad during the playoffs, in which the Blackhawks claimed their third championship in six years.

His tenure with Chicago was short-lived as on June 30, 2015, he was included in the trade of Brandon Saad to the Columbus Blue Jackets in exchange for Jeremy Morin, Marko Dano, Artem Anisimov, Corey Tropp and a fourth-round draft pick in 2016.

After one season with the Blue Jackets and having completed his entry-level contract, Paliotta was not tendered a qualifying offer to remain with the club. As a free agent, Paliotta was signed to a one-year, two-way contract with the New York Rangers on July 1, 2016. He spent the duration of the 2016–17 season, with AHL affiliate, the Hartford Wolf Pack.

On July 14, 2017, Paliotta signed as a free agent to a one-year AHL contract with the Toronto Marlies. He appeared in 8 scoreless games with the Marlies to start the 2017–18 season before he was traded to the Texas Stars on January 11, 2018.

Paliotta went unsigned from the Texas Stars over the summer, before agreeing as a free agent to a one-year AHL contract with the Stockton Heat, affiliate to the Calgary Flames on September 14, 2018. In the 2018–19 season, Pailotta recorded 4 assists in 32 games from the blueline for the Heat.

After his contract with the Heat, Paliotta familiarly continued his journeyman career, agreeing to a one-year AHL contract with the Binghamton Devils, affiliate to the New Jersey Devils, on August 29, 2019.

== Career statistics ==
=== Regular season and playoffs ===
			Regular season					Playoffs
Season	Team	League	GP	G	A	Pts	PIM	GP	G	A	Pts	PIM
2009–10	U.S. National Development Team	USHL	32	1	6	7	43	—	—	—	—	—
2010–11	U.S. National Development Team	USHL	24	0	5	5	35	—	—	—	—	—
2011–12	University of Vermont	HE	30	4	6	10	44	—	—	—	—	—
2012–13	University of Vermont	HE	35	1	9	10	50	—	—	—	—	—
2013–14	University of Vermont	HE	38	5	22	27	51	—	—	—	—	—
2014–15	University of Vermont	HE	41	9	27	36	40	—	—	—	—	—
2014–15	Chicago Blackhawks	NHL	1	0	1	1	0	—	—	—	—	—
2015–16	Lake Erie Monsters	AHL	68	8	15	23	29	8	0	0	0	0
2015–16	Columbus Blue Jackets	NHL	1	0	0	0	4	—	—	—	—	—
2016–17	Hartford Wolf Pack	AHL	52	1	13	14	20	—	—	—	—	—
2017–18	Toronto Marlies	AHL	8	0	0	0	2	—	—	—	—	—
2017–18	Texas Stars	AHL	17	1	3	4	6	—	—	—	—	—
2018–19	Stockton Heat	AHL	32	0	4	4	26	—	—	—	—	—
2019–20	Binghamton Devils	AHL	21	0	2	2	20	—	—	—	—	—
NHL totals			2	0	1	1	4	—	—	—	—	—

=== International ===
Year	Team	Event	Result	GP	G	A	Pts	PIM
2010	United States	U17	1st place, gold medalist(s)	6	0	2	2	4
2011	United States	WJC18	1st place, gold medalist(s)	6	0	1	1	2
Junior totals				12	0	3	3	6

== Awards and honors ==
Awards	Year
AHL
Calder Cup (Lake Erie Monsters)	2016

Awards and achievements
Preceded by Josh Manson	Hockey East Best Defensive Defenseman; 2014–15	Succeeded by Steve Santini
