= Brandon Saad =

American ice hockey player (born 1992)

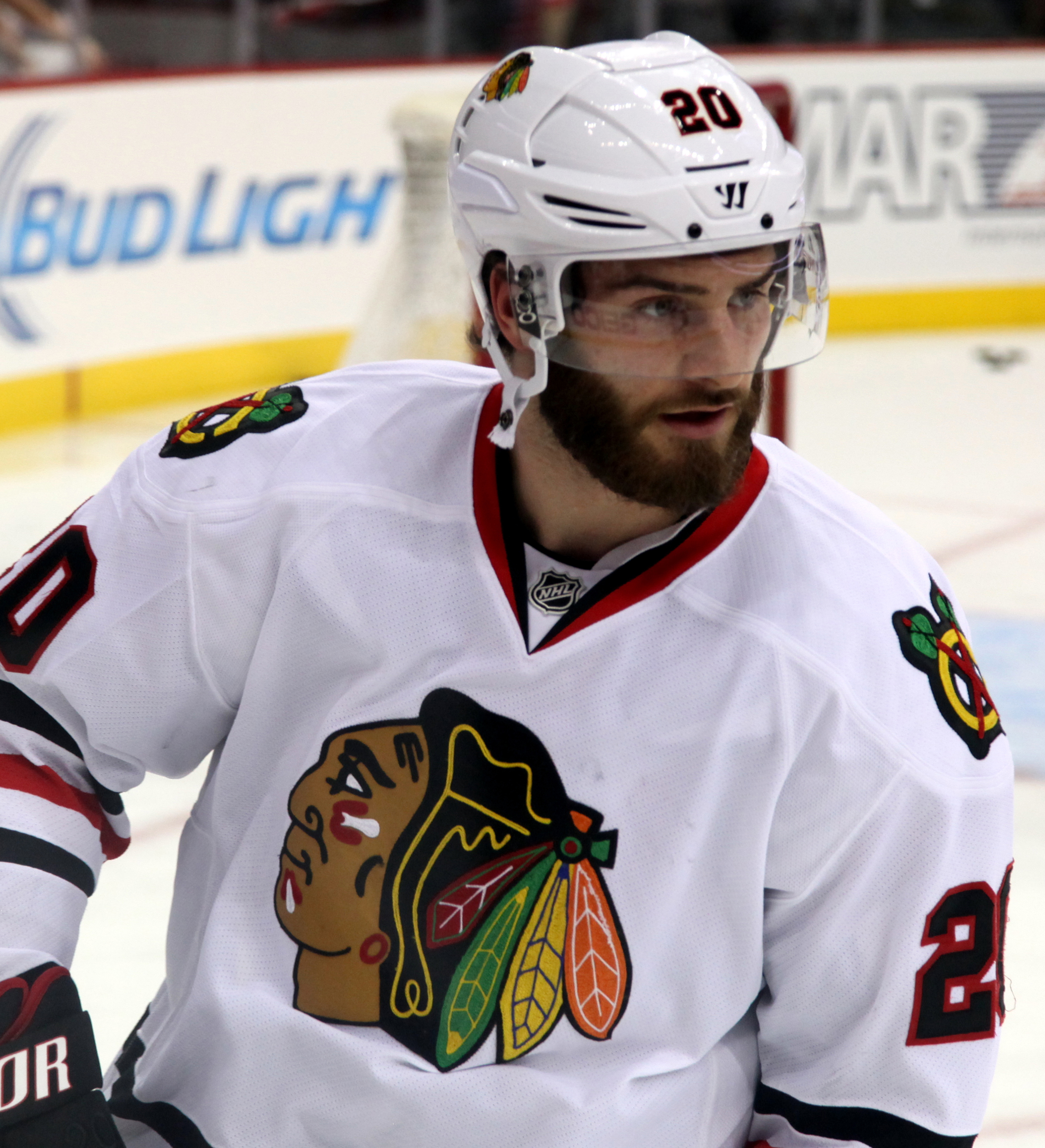
- Saad with the Chicago Blackhawks in 2014
- Born: October 27, 1992 (age 34) Pittsburgh, Pennsylvania, U.S.
- Height: 6 ft 1 in (185 cm)
- Weight: 202 lb (92 kg; 14 st 6 lb)
- Position: Winger
- Shoots: Left
- NHL team Former teams: Free agent Chicago Blackhawks; Columbus Blue Jackets; Colorado Avalanche; St. Louis Blues; Vegas Golden Knights
- NHL draft: 43rd overall, 2011; Chicago Blackhawks
- Playing career: 2011–present

Brandon Saad (born October 27, 1992) is an American professional ice hockey player who is a winger who is currently an unrestricted free agent. He most recently played for the Vegas Golden Knights of the National Hockey League (NHL).

Saad grew up playing ice hockey in his home state of Pennsylvania before joining the Saginaw Spirit of the Ontario Hockey League, playing two seasons with the team before being drafted in the second round, 43rd overall, by the Chicago Blackhawks of the National Hockey League in the 2011 NHL entry draft. After debuting with the Blackhawks the following season, he briefly joined the team's minor league affiliate before becoming a full-time member of the roster beginning in 2013. He is a two-time Stanley Cup champion having won with the Blackhawks in 2013 and 2015. The Blackhawks traded Saad to the Columbus Blue Jackets before the 2015–16 NHL season, during which he was named an NHL All-Star. He played in Columbus for two seasons before the Blackhawks reacquired him in another trade before the 2017–18 NHL season. During his second stint with the Blackhawks, Saad was traded to the Colorado Avalanche for one season, before signing with the St. Louis Blues. Halfway through the 2024–25 NHL season, the Blues terminated Saad's contract after not reporting to their AHL affiliate. The Vegas Golden Knights signed Saad shortly after his termination.

Internationally, Saad has represented the United States in several junior ice hockey tournaments and captured a gold medal for the nation in the 2010 World U18 Championships.

== Early life ==
Saad was born on October 27, 1992, in Pittsburgh, to a Syrian father, George Sr., and an American mother, Sandy.

== Playing career ==
=== Amateur ===
Growing up in Gibsonia, Pennsylvania, Saad played minor hockey for the Pittsburgh Hornets in the Tier 1 Elite Hockey League. While playing with the U14 Hornets team in the 2005–06 season, Saad tallied 16 goals and 21 assists through 30 games. He also competed with the Hornets at the 2005 Quebec International Pee-Wee Hockey Tournament and at the 2007 USA Hockey National Championship. Saad split the 2007–08 season with the U18 Hornets and the Pine-Richland High Rams, where he played alongside his older brother. However, the coach of the Rams acknowledged that it was not likely Saad would remain at Pine-Richland High School because he was being scouted by the USA Hockey National Team Development Program (NTDP). While with the U18 Hornets, Saad set a program record with 54 goals and 124 points in one season. As a freshman with the Pine-Richland High Rams, Saad ranked sixth on the team with eight goals and 19 assists for 27 points. He was also recognized as a Pittsburgh North Hockey All-Star.

Saad turned down the opportunity to join the NTDP for the 2008–09 season and was subsequently drafted by the Saginaw Spirit in the first round of the 2008 Ontario Hockey League (OHL) draft. Instead of immediately joining the OHL, Saad and his older brother played the 2008–09 season with the Mahoning Valley Phantoms in the North American Hockey League (NAHL). While playing with the Phantoms, Saad was selected to represent the United States under-17 team at the 2009 World U-17 Hockey Challenge. He helped the U17 team win a bronze medal and was named to the tournament all-star team. Saad returned to the Phantoms following the tournament and finished his rookie season with 29 goals and 18 assists over 47 games. The league took notice of his efforts and he was named the NAHL's Rookie of the Year and selected for the First All-Star Team and All-Rookie Team.

For the 2009–10 season, Saad joined the NTDP while his brother enrolled at Pennsylvania State University. In his only season with the team, Saad recorded 29 goals and 29 assists for 58 points. After one season with the NTDP, Saad joined the Saginaw Spirit for the 2010–11 OHL season. Saad later stated that he delayed his acceptance into the OHL because he felt unprepared. He credited his time with the NTDP and at the 2010 World U18 Championships for helping him decide he was ready for the OHL. Saad began the season by scoring four goals over his first five games with the Spirit. By the end of November, Saad had recorded two hat-tricks and ranked sixth in the league in scoring with 19. Although he was named to the preliminary roster for the 2011 United States national junior team, Saad was cut before the final roster was announced. After being ranked eighth among North American skaters by the NHL Central Scouting Bureau in January Saad was named to Team Orr for the CHL Top Prospects game. Due in part because of a lingering groin injury, Saad's second half of the season was not as offensively productive as the first. He finished the season with 27 goals and 28 assists, with only seven of those points coming in the final 32 games of the season. While his ranking dropped from eighth to 19th by June, Saad was still expected to be drafted in the first round of the 2011 NHL entry draft. However, he was eventually drafted in the second round, 43rd overall, by the Chicago Blackhawks.

=== Professional ===
==== Chicago Blackhawks (2011–2015) ====
After impressing the coaching staff during the Blackhawks' training camp, Saad signed a three-year, entry-level contract with the team on October 4, 2011. It was announced that he would start the season with the Blackhawks, making him the lowest-selected Chicago draft pick to start with the Blackhawks in their draft year since defenseman Lasse Kukkonen (drafted 151st overall) in the 2003–04 season. He was expected to immediately start the season on the Blackhawks' top line as the left wing to center Jonathan Toews and right wing Patrick Sharp. Saad made his NHL debut on October 7, 2011, against the Dallas Stars and played one more game against the team before being reassigned to Saginaw on October 12. Upon returning to the Spirit, Saad made an immediate impact on the lineup by leading the league with six goals and four assists for 10 points over three games. He was recognized for his efforts with the CHL Player of the Week honor on October 24. By the end of October, Saad had accumulated 18 points over eight games. Although he would miss all of November due to a hand injury, Saad recovered in time to join the United States national junior team at the 2012 World Junior Championships in December 2011. Upon returning from the Championships, Saad maintained a 16-game point streak between January 15 and February 24. At the same time, he was also appointed team captain for the remainder of the 2011–12 season after Ryan O'Connor was traded to the Barrie Colts. He finished the regular season leading the league with 1.73 points per game as he helped th Spirit climb from ninth place to fourth in the conference standings. Saad improved on his previous seasons total with 34 goals and 42 assists for 76 points through 44 games while recording just 38 penalty minutes. As such, he became the second member of the Spirit, and to first American-born player since 1993 to win the William Hanley Trophy as the OHL's Most Sportsmanlike Player. He was also named to the OHL's 2011–12 First All-Star Team.

As the Spirit qualified for the 2012 OHL playoffs, Saad continued to produce offensively and led the team in scoring. During their Western Conference first-round series against the Sarnia Sting, Saad tallied six goals and 12 points over five games. He finished the playoffs with the league's third-highest point total after accumulating eight goals and nine assists for 17 points through 12 games.

Following the conclusion of his OHL season, Saad was recalled to the Blackhawks on April 16 to help them with their 2012 Stanley Cup playoffs berth. He made his playoff debut a few games later on April 19, 2012, as the Blackhawks fell to the Phoenix Coyotes in game four. He returned to the Blackhawks lineup for game five where he skated on the left wing of Patrick Kane and Patrick Sharp. He scored his first career NHL point with an assist on a goal by defenseman Nick Leddy to lead the Blackhawks to an eventual 2–1 win. Despite his efforts, the Blackhawks were eliminated from playoff contention in the first round.

Saad returned to the Blackhawks training camp ahead of the 2012–13 season but was reassigned to their American Hockey League (AHL) affiliate, the Rockford IceHogs, in anticipation of the 2012–13 NHL lockout. Saad struggled initially with the IceHogs as he suffered a leg injury while going pointless through his first few games. After missing seven games to recover from his injury, Saad tallied his first professional goal in a 5–3 loss to the Grand Rapids Griffins on November 9. He added his first professional assist the following game against the Milwaukee Admirals. By January 14, Saad had tallied eight goals and 12 assists for 20 points through 31 games for the IceHogs. He was named CCM/AHL Player of the Week for the period of January 7–13 after scoring six points in just three games, including two game-winning goals. Once the lockout was resolved, the Blackhawks included Saad on the team's starting roster for the shortened, 48-game 2012–13 season. Saad scored his first career NHL goal in his ninth regular season game on February 5 against the San Jose Sharks on Sharks' goaltender Antti Niemi. On February 22, Saad scored the Blackhawks' game-winning, short-handed goal to secure an NHL-record 17th straight game with at least one point to start a season, breaking the previous record of 16-straight games held by the 2006–07 Anaheim Ducks. While remaining on the Blackhawks' top line with Toews and Marian Hossa, Saad tallied three goals and no assists through his first 18 games. He was kept on the top line because coach Joel Quenneville felt he was playing well enough in different areas. In early March, Saad had recorded his first career three-point game to accumulate six points over five games. Saad finished the month of March with four goals and 12 assists for 16 points over 32 games. He eventually finished his rookie season with 10 goals and 17 assists for 27 points through 46 games while also leading all NHL rookies with a plus-17 rating. As a result of his successful season, Saad was named as a finalist for the 2013 Calder Memorial Trophy as the NHL's top rookie, which eventually was given to Florida Panthers winger Jonathan Huberdeau. He was also named to the NHL's 2012–13 All-Rookie Team.

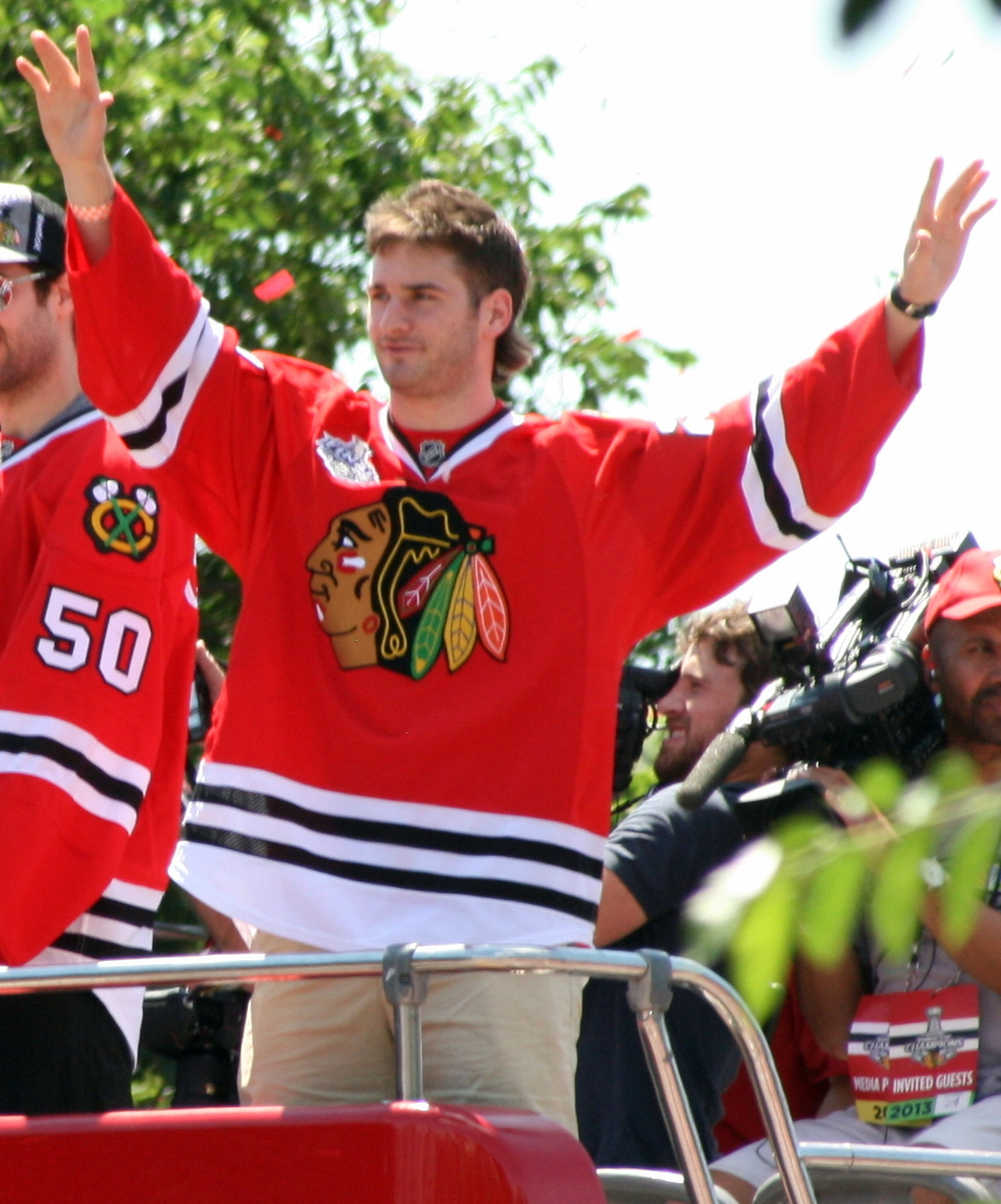
Saad during the Chicago Blackhawks' 2013 Stanley Cup parade

When the Blackhawks qualified for the 2013 playoffs and clinching the Presidents' Trophy as the best regular season team, Saad continued to remain on their top line with Toews and Hossa. In game one of their first-round series against the eighth seeded Minnesota Wild, Saad played 21 minutes and had two shots on net to help lift the Blackhawks to a 2–1 overtime win. However, the line struggled to produce through the first four games of the series as they combined for only one goal and one assist. Saad was given time to produce in the first three games against the Wild, averaging just over 20 minutes a game, but he recorded zero points. Although the line began to pick up points in game five, Saad finished the series with only one assist. As such, Saad was moved onto a different line ahead of the conference semifinals. He was originally moved to their second line with Dave Bolland and Patrick Kane but also spent time on the third line with Andrew Shaw and Viktor Stålberg. While on the third line, his ice time diminished to a season-low 10:47 in game five. After the Blackhawks eliminated the seventh seeded Detroit Red Wings and faced the defending Stanley Cup champion and fifth seeded Los Angeles Kings, Saad began to pick up points. Although he remained on the third line, Saad recorded two assists in the Blackhawks' game two win. After the Blackhawks defeated the Kings in five games, they faced off against the fourth seeded Boston Bruins in the 2013 Stanley Cup Final. Although he entered the series opener with only four assists over 17 playoff games, Saad emerged as a vital player in the Blackhawks' Stanley Cup Final series. As the only Blackhawks rookie to play in game one, Saad played over 31 minutes and had nine of Chicago's 63 shots on goal. He was originally on the third line but was moved up to the first during the game. While on the top line, he tallied his first goal of the postseason in the second period to help lift the Blackhawks to a 4–3 win over the Boston Bruins. On June 24, Saad became the first Saginaw Spirit alum to win a Stanley Cup after the Blackhawks defeated the Boston Bruins in six games.

Leading up to the 2013–14 season, Saad was tested out at center on the second line with Patrick Sharp and Marian Hossa. Although he had not played that position since his junior hockey career, coach Quenneville spoke highly of Saad's ability to play in the new role. However, Saad preferred his position at left wing and Michal Handzuš quickly accepted the second line center role. Once the season started, Saad led the team with two goals and four assists for six points over eight games. He played left wing to Patrick Kane's right wing before Kris Versteeg joined the team after a trade in November. By early January, he had tallied 31 points and tied for third on the team with 15 goals. Later that month, Saad and Kane gained Andrew Shaw as a new linemate. Over their first two games together, Saad has three assists while Shaw added two goals and one assist. However, Saad's play began to decrease heading into the break for the 2014 Winter Olympics. On March 16, Saad suffered an upper-body injury in their loss to the Detroit Red Wings. At the time, he had accumulated 19 goals and 44 points while also tying for first among teammates with a plus-29. He missed three games to recover from the injury and struggled upon returning to the Blackhawks lineup. In his first five games back in the lineup, he went pointless while also combining for minus-7 during that time. As he continued to struggle, Saad was made a healthy scratch ahead of the Blackhawks' 4–2 win over the St. Louis Blues on April 6. Saad finished his sophomore season with 19 goals and 28 assists for 45 points and a plus-23 rating. His 17.6 on-ice Corsi rate was fourth-highest among team forwards and ranked 14th among league forwards.

As the Blackhawks once again qualified for the Stanley Cup playoffs, he began the postseason by posting two assists in game two to mark his second career postseason multi-point game. He also led the team with three assists through two playoff contests against the St. Louis Blues. After eliminating the Blues, the Blackhawks met with the Minnesota Wild in the second round. In game two of their series, Saad recorded two goals to mark his first multi-goal playoff game. Although Saad was moved to the second line alongside Handzuš and Kane, the Blackhawks eliminated the Wild in six games and met with the Los Angeles Kings in the Western Conference Final for the second straight year. During game one, Saad opened the scoring with his first career postseason power-play goal and added an assist to set new career highs in postseason points. Later, Saad tallied a goal and two assists to help the Blackhawks to a double-overtime win in game five to stave off elimination. While playing alongside Kane and Andrew Shaw, the trio combined for 14 points through games five and six. Despite their success, the Blackhawks were eliminated by the eventual Stanley Cup champion Kings in game seven in overtime.

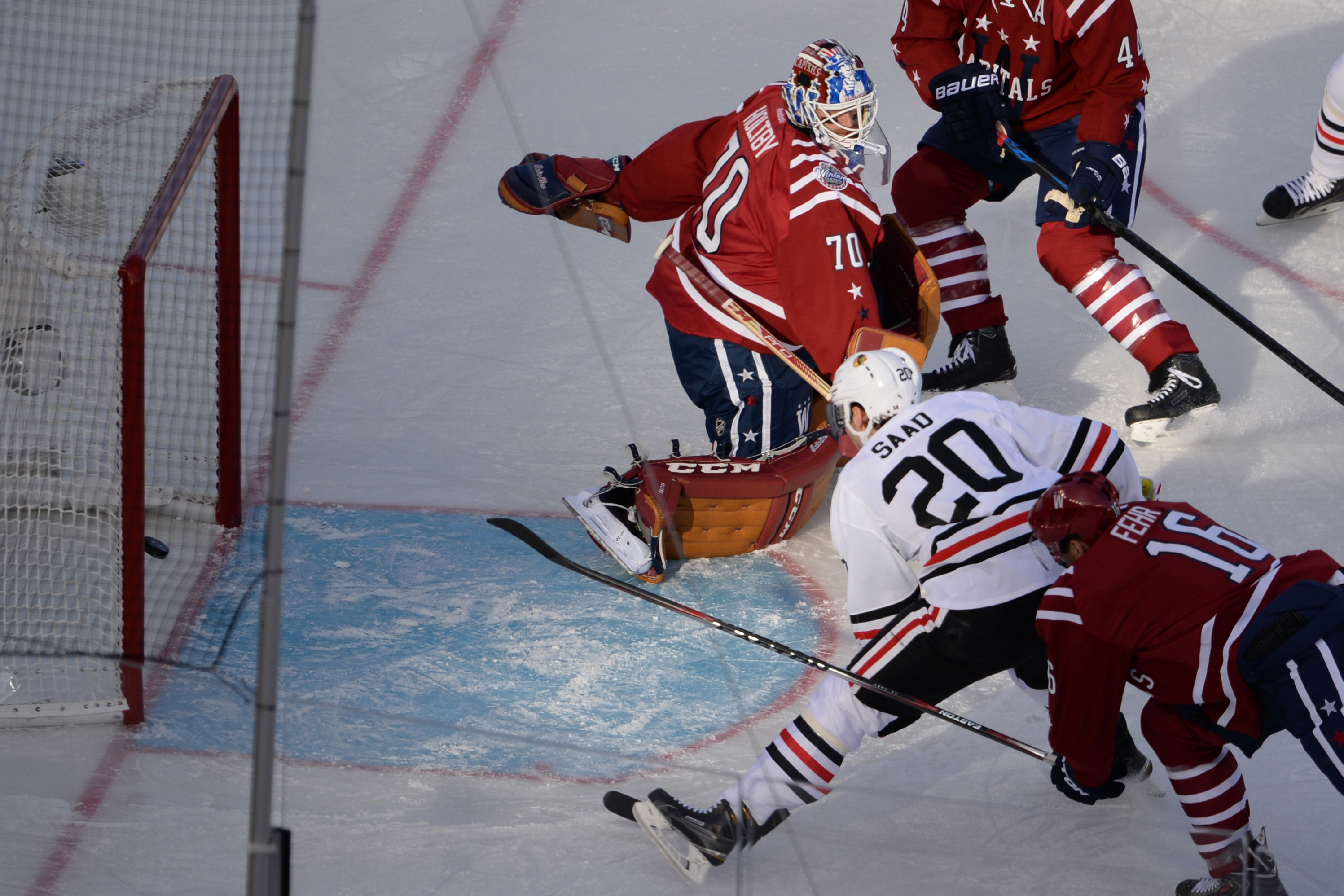
Saad drives to the net during the 2015 NHL Winter Classic at Nationals Park.

Saad entered the 2014–15 season as an early candidate to have a breakout season while being a mainstay on the second line. He began the season bouncing between different roles and on different lines as he scored just one goal and seven assists for eight points in the first 13 games. In late November, Saad rejoined Hossa and Toews on the Blackhawks top line and the three began a breakout campaign. In his first game with the duo, Saad scored a goal, had three shots on net, was a plus-2, and led the team's forwards with a plus-15 Corsi in 5-on-5 situations. As the month continued, the trio helped the Blackhawks maintain an 11–2–0 record. By December 6, Saad had recorded his fourth multi-point game of the season to extend his point streak to four games. He was also tied for fourth on the team with six goals and 13 assists for 19 points through 27 games. During the 2015 NHL Winter Classic, Saad helped Toews set an NHL record for most points in an outdoor game. By the end of the month, Saad, Toews, and Hossa had reached double-digits in goals while Kane led with 23. Saad finished the season with a career-high 23 goals and 29 assists for 52 points through all 82 games. His 208 regular season games ranked fifth among 2011 draftees while his 126 points tied for third with Ondřej Palát from that draft class.

As the Blackhawks qualified for the 2015 playoffs, Saad continued to make an impression in the lineup. Throughout their playoff berth, Saad tallied numerous important goals that helped the Blackhawks clinch their second Stanley Cup in three years. During game four of their first-round series against the Nashville Predators, Saad scored the game tying goal to help lift the Blackhawks to an overtime win. His goal helped the Blackhawks lead the series at 3–1 and they eventually eliminated the Predators in six games to advance to the second round against the Minnesota Wild. He scored his third goal of the postseason in game one to help the Blackhawks secure a win. They swept the Wild in four games and faced off against the top seeded Anaheim Ducks in the Conference Final. During final two games of their short series against the Ducks, Saad played with Toews and Kane on their top line. They eliminated the Ducks in seven games to face off against the Tampa Bay Lightning in the 2015 Stanley Cup Final. While the Blackhawks were losing the series 2–1 in the series, Saad scored two goals in game four on Lightning rookie goaltender Andrei Vasilevskiy to help the Blackhawks win the game two–1 to even the series 2–2. He scored the tiebreaking goal with 13:38 left to play and then the game winner in overtime after the Tampa Bay Lightning tied it in the third period. The Blackhawks won the next two games to win the Stanley Cup.

==== Columbus Blue Jackets (2015–2017) ====
After winning the 2015 Stanley Cup, Saad and the Blackhawks could not come to a contract agreement. Although his hometown team, the Pittsburgh Penguins wished to acquire him, Saad's negotiation rights were traded to the Columbus Blue Jackets on June 30, 2015. Along with his negotiation rights, the Blue Jackets also received Alex Broadhurst and Michael Paliotta in exchange for Jeremy Morin, Marko Daňo, Artem Anisimov, Corey Tropp and a 2016 fourth-round draft pick. A few days later, Saad signed a six-year contract extension with the Blue Jackets worth $36 million. While participating in the Blue Jackets training camp, Saad suffered an injury after taking a puck to the mouth. He subsequently missed the Blue Jackets preseason opener to undergo four root canals in dental surgery. He returned for the remainder of their preseason contents where he combined for 10 goals and 15 assists over three games with linemates Nick Foligno and Ryan Johansen. In spite of their preseason success, the Blue Jackets maintained a franchise-worst 0–6–0 record to start the 2015–16 season. After totalling 12 points in his first 20 games under John Tortorella, he amassed 19 points in his next 23 games. Despite his slow start, Saad was projected to earn his first NHL All-Star Game selection as he quickly tallied the most power-play goals in the division by November 18. Tortorella later attributed Saad's slow start as due to the coach's inability to understand how he played the game. From December 17 to January 2, Saad tallied seven goals and six assists during a career-high seven-game point streak while also leading the NHL with 28 backhand shots and tied for second with four. By early January, Saad had registered 16 goals and 13 assists for 29 points through 39 games. He also led the team in goals, game-winning goals, and shots on goal, while ranking second in points and power-play goals. As a result of his playing success, Saad was voted into his first NHL All-Star Game on January 6. Prior to participating in the 2016 NHL All-Star Game, Saad tied for the team lead in scoring with 31 points and recorded his third multi-goal game of the season. By March 4, Saad had accumulated a team-leading 24 goals and 17 assists before suffering an upper body injury during a game against the Edmonton Oilers. He subsequently missed three games before returning to the lineup for their matchup against the Lightning on March 13. The following month, Saad scored his first career NHL hat-trick in a 5–1 win over the Carolina Hurricanes on April 2. Shortly after the hat-trick, Saad and teammate Boone Jenner became the first Blue Jackets teammates to record 30 goals in the same season. This also marked the first time in Saad's NHL career that he hit the 30-goal milestone. He finished the 2015–16 regular season with a career-high 31 goals and 53 points as the Blue Jackets failed to qualify for the 2016 Stanley Cup playoffs.

During the 2016 off-season, Saad participated in the 2016 World Cup of Hockey as the oldest member of Team North America. Upon rejoining the Blue Jackets, Saad began the 2016–17 season on a line with Sam Gagner before being promoted to the top line with Alexander Wennberg and Nick Foligno. The new line instantly developed chemistry together and they dominated the Blue Jackets in scoring for the first three months of the season. By November 6, the trio had combined for 23 points over six games. Later that month, Saad played in his 300th career NHL game on November 15 against the Washington Capitals. He also tallied his 200th career NHL point with an assist on Gagner's goal during a game against the Arizona Coyotes on December 5. By December 11, Saad led the team in points per 60 minutes of play and individual shot attempts while ranking fourth in overall points with 21. Saad also helped the Blue Jackets match the third-longest winning streak in NHL history following a win over the Winnipeg Jets on December 29. Although their win streak was snapped at 16 games, Saad, Wennberg, Foligno, and Cam Atkinson helped the Blue Jackets become the only team in the league with four players in the top-25 in league scoring. During their win streak, Foligno, Saad, and Wennberg each maintained a six-game point streak. Despite his early success, Saad was soon moved back to the fourth line with Gagner after two of their bottom-six forwards suffered injuries in February. Saad finished the regular season third on the Blue Jackets with 24 goals and 29 assists for 53 points over 82 games. However, he finished the season being held without a point in 11 of the final 15 games. The Blue Jackets qualified for the 2017 Stanley Cup playoffs where they faced his hometown team, the defending champions, the Pittsburgh Penguins, in the first round. In game one of their first-round series, Saad played 14:26 of ice time but was limited to 1:45 in the third as he was benched for the majority of the period. He improved the following game by recording one goal and a +8 rating as the Blue Jackets fell 4–1 to the Penguins. This continued throughout the series and he finished the 2017 playoffs with one goal and two assists for three points over five games.

==== Return to Chicago (2017–2020) ====
On June 23, 2017, Saad returned to the Chicago Blackhawks along with Anton Forsberg and a 2018 fifth-round draft pick via a trade from the Blue Jackets in exchange for Artemi Panarin, Tyler Motte and a 2017 sixth-round draft pick. He immediately rejoined Jonathan Toews on the top line alongside Richard Pánik, who had replaced Marian Hossa, on the right. Saad began the 2017–18 season by recording a hat-trick in their season opener against his hometown team, the Pittsburgh Penguins en route to a 10–1 win. This set a new franchise record for most goals scored in a season opener, beating the previous record by two goals. Saad's hat trick was also one of four around the league, matching a new league record set in 1917. He also became the first Blackhawks player to score a hat trick in a season opener since Bobby Hull in 1965. Following the season opener, Saad accumulated five goals and two assists while his line combined for 18 points over four games. However, Saad's success began to slow down as the month continued and experienced a 10-game scoring drought before snapping it on November 11. Although Toews and Pánik also struggled, coach Quenneville kept the trio together on the top line. On November 25, Saad tied a franchise record for most shots in a period with seven while tallying his eighth goal of the season in a win over the Florida Panthers. Saad remained on Toews' left wing while Pánik was replaced by rookie Alex DeBrincat later that month. By the end of December, Saad had tallied five goals and nine points over 31 games and averaged 2.27 shots on goal. Saad's production began to pick back up in January as Vinnie Hinostroza joined the Blackhawks top line on the right side of Toews. By January 7, Saad had tallied two goals and four assists over four games to maintain a four-game point streak. However, after experiencing an 11-game goalless drought in which he tallied only one assist, Saad was moved back to the Blackhawks' fourth line. Saad finished the season with 18 goals and 17 assists for 35 points in all 82 games, the lowest point total of his NHL career. Despite having more shots per 60 minutes than in any previous season, his shooting percentage dropped to 7.6. He also tallied only one point on the power play despite logging more than 174 minutes on the man-advantage.

Saad started the Blackhawks' 2018 training camp playing on their second line with centre Nick Schmaltz and Kane instead of with Toews. However, he was soon replaced with Artem Anisimov and subsequently bumped to the third line. After beginning the 2018–19 season with one point through four games on the second line, Saad was demoted to the fourth line alongside David Kämpf and Marcus Krüger. After being warned that he could be a healthy scratch if his play did not pick up, he tallied his second assist of the season in his first game on the fourth line. His production continued to increase while playing on the fourth line and after tallying two goals and one assist over three games, he was reunited with Kane and Anisimov on the second line. While playing on the second line, Saad had a 54.88 percent Corsi and averaged 7.5 shots on goal per 60 minutes. Although the Blackhawks underwent a coaching change and a lengthy losing streak in November, Saad was playing his best hockey of the season. His momentum was shortly stalled after he missed two games due to an arm injury, but he continued to produce upon returning to the lineup. On November 18, Saad scored in consecutive games for the first time of the season to tally four goals over seven games. He had totalled 13 points by December 16 while playing an average of 18:34 alongside Toews and rookie Dominik Kahun after producing only seven points through 15 games with Quenneville. However, he soon experienced his second-longest drought of the season after going six games without scoring a goal. He snapped the drought on December 27 by scoring two goals in a 5–2 win over the Minnesota Wild. On February 1, Saad scored two goals to help the Blackhawks to a 7–3 win over the Buffalo Sabres in his 500th career NHL game. This was his fourth and fifth goal over six games to give him 17 on the season and put him on pace for 27 goals overall. By March 1, Saad ranked fourth on the team with 21 goals and was the main scorer on the third line. While Drake Caggiula was recovering from a concussion, Saad was moved back up to the first line with Kane and Toews. Saad finished the regular season on the top line with Toews and Dominik Kahun. He tallied 12 goals and 23 assists for 35 points through 79 games as the Blackhawks missed the 2019 Stanley Cup playoffs.

During the Blackhawks' 2019 training camp, Saad was reunited with Jonathan Toews and Dominik Kubalík as their first line left winger and the trio immediately developed chemistry together. Within the first four games of the season, Saad had tallied two goals and an assist while helping to create 33 scoring chances and only 21 opposing scoring chances. He spent the entirety of October on the third line before earning a promotion to the Blackhawks' top line at the start of November. He played in his 400th game with Chicago on December 8, 2019. Despite experiencing a six-game scoreless drought, Saad quickly accumulated 11 goals by December 17 to rank second on the team. However, shortly after achieving this rank, he suffered an ankle injury and subsequently missed 12 games in late December and early January. He returned to the Blackhawks lineup on January 18 for their game against the Toronto Maple Leafs, playing 17:08 of ice time and tallying his 12th goal of the season. He continued to tally points in his next four games and quickly accumulated a four-game goal streak and 12 game point streak. By the time the season was cut short three weeks early due to the COVID-19 pandemic, Saad had added another 10 goals over 22 games to finish third on the team with 21 goals.

==== Colorado Avalanche (2020–2021) ====
On October 10, 2020, the Blackhawks traded Saad away for a second time in his career, along with Dennis Gilbert, to the Colorado Avalanche in exchange for Nikita Zadorov and Anton Lindholm. As a part of the transaction, the Blackhawks retained $1 million of his $6 million salary for the remaining year of his contract. Saad missed the first three days of the teams' training camp leading up to the pandemic-shortened 2020-21 season after initially being deemed 'unfit to play.' Saad made his debut with the Avalanche in the season opener on January 13, 2021, while playing on the right wing alongside Nazem Kadri and Gabriel Landeskog on the second line. After the Avalanche fell 4–1 to the St. Louis Blues, Saad was returned to his usual left wing position with Kadri at the centre and Andre Burakovsky on the right. However, Kadri and Saad also struggled and they combined for a minus-16 rating through the next six games. In their seventh game together, Saad scored twice in their win over the San Jose Sharks to improve their record to 4–3–0. On January 29, Saad tallied two assists for his straight multi-point game and his first since December 2018. By the end of the month, he had maintained a four-game point streak that included four goals and three assists. He also tied with Joonas Donskoi for second on the team with five goals. On February 14, 2021, Saad played in his 600th career NHL game with a total of 174 goals and 181 assists over that time span. Later that month, he missed his first game of the season to be with his wife while she was giving birth. On March 5, Saad recorded his fifth multi-point performance and first three-point game of the season. While playing alongside Tyson Jost and Valeri Nichushkin in April, Saad matched his career-best goal streak while tying Donskoi for fourth on the team with 15 goals. His efforts also helped the Avalanche win the Presidents' Trophy as the regular season champions and qualify for the 2021 playoffs. By April 26, he had tallied 15 goals and nine assists before suffering a lower-body injury during a game against the St. Louis Blues. Saad subsequently missed the remainder of the COVID-19 pandemic-shortened regular season but returned to the Avalanche's lineup for their postseason berth.

Upon returning to the Avalanche lineup for game one of the first round, Saad played alongside Jost and Nichushkin as the Avalanche beat the St. Louis Blues 4–1. During their game two win, Saad tallied his first point of the postseason with an empty net goal to solidify their 6–3 win. He subsequently scored in the next two games as the Avalanche swept the Blues in four games. Saad continued his scoring prowess during their second-round series against the Vegas Golden Knights by scoring in the first two games of their series. He set a new record for his longest goal streak in the playoffs or regular season and tied for the third-longest in franchise playoff history. After the Golden Knights tied the series 2–2, coach Jared Bednar placed Saad on the first line with Nathan MacKinnon and Mikko Rantanen for game six. While playing in his 90th career playoff game, Saad continued to lead the team with seven goals in nine games and became the fourth player in franchise history to maintain a similar goal streak in games where the Avalanche/Nordiques were the home team.

==== St. Louis Blues (2021–2025) ====
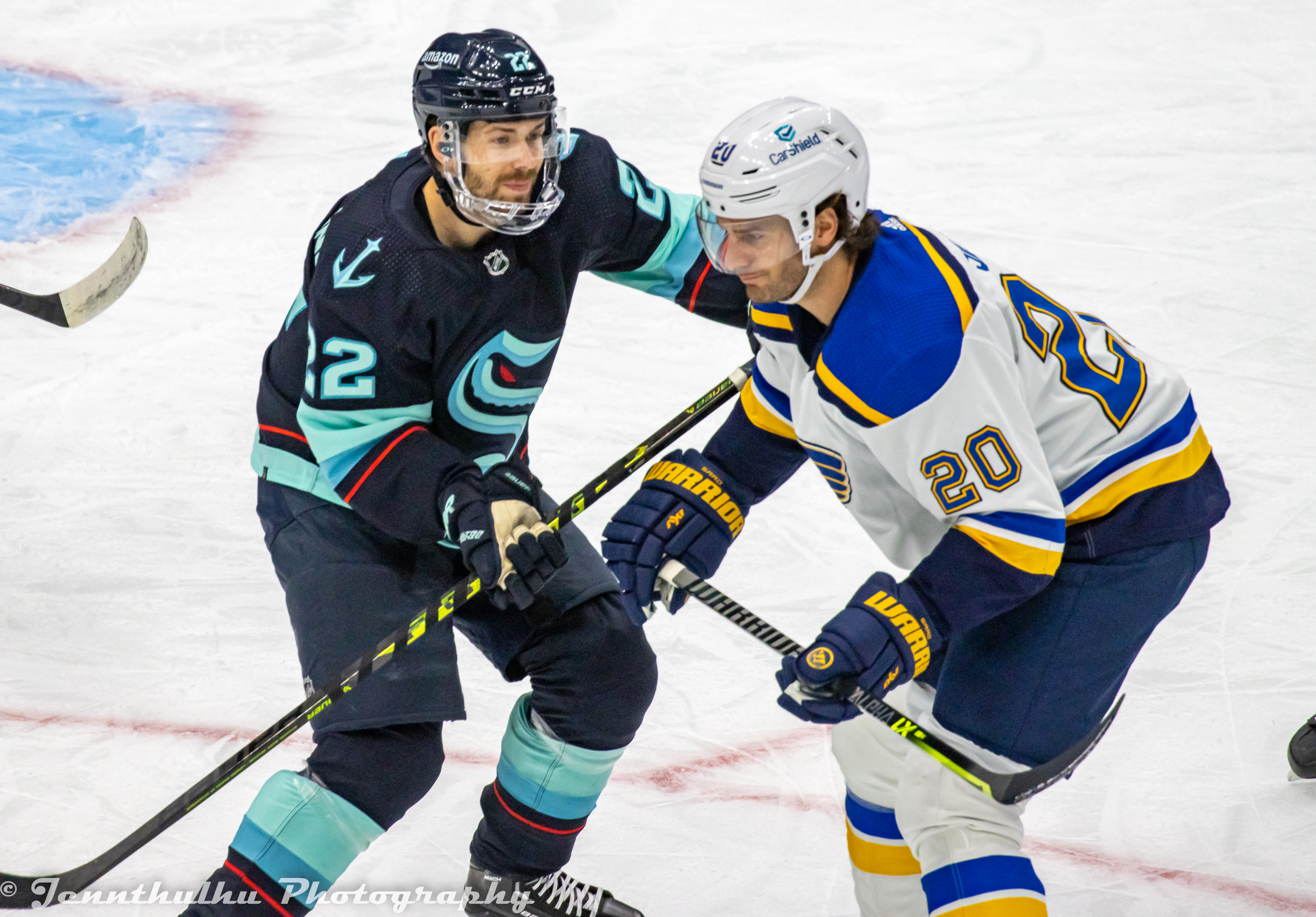
Saad (right) with the St. Louis Blues in December 2022

As a free agent, Saad was signed to a five-year, $22.5 million contract by the Avalanche's divisional rival, the St. Louis Blues, on July 29, 2021. Although he had changed his jersey number while with the Avalanche, his new teammate Alexander Steen allowed him to return to using #20. Saad began the season on the Blues' third line pairing with Robert Thomas and Vladimir Tarasenko but was expected to eventually move to the top pairing with Ryan O'Reilly. Although he would spend time on other lines, the top unit of Saad–O'Reilly–David Perron opened 43 regular season and playoff games together. Saad experienced a successful campaign during the 2021–22 season. He was one of seven Blues players to score at least 20 goals for the first time since the 1984–85 season. He finished the regular season with 24 goals to help the Blues clinch a berth in the 2022 Stanley Cup playoffs.

Saad began the 2022–23 season on a new line with Jordan Kyrou and O'Reilly, but he struggled to produce and only recorded one point over 13 games. Following injuries to O'Reilly and Tarasenko, Saad broke out while paired with Brayden Schenn and Ivan Barbashev. Immediately upon joining this line, he tallied five goals and two assists for seven points over four games to tie for the most points in the NHL. Once the production slowed, he replaced Buchnevich on a line with Thomas and Kyrou to "drive the net."

After missing the first three games of the 2024–25 season due to the birth of his third child, Saad scored his 500th career NHL point on October 22 against the Winnipeg Jets. During the season, Saad's offensive production dipped as his ice time decreased due to his poor performance, often spending time on the team's bottom lines, although Saad did score a natural hat trick on January 4, 2025, in a 4–0 win over the Ottawa Senators, the third hat trick of his career. After continuing to play generally poorly throughout the season, including posting a team-worst plus–minus of –14, the Blues attempted to trade Saad but did not find interest from other clubs and subsequently placed Saad on waivers to send him to their AHL affiliate Springfield Thunderbirds on January 28. After clearing waivers the following day, Saad refused to report to the Thunderbirds and was instead placed on unconditional waivers for the purpose of mutual contract termination, forfeiting the final year of his contract and $5.425 million in salary.

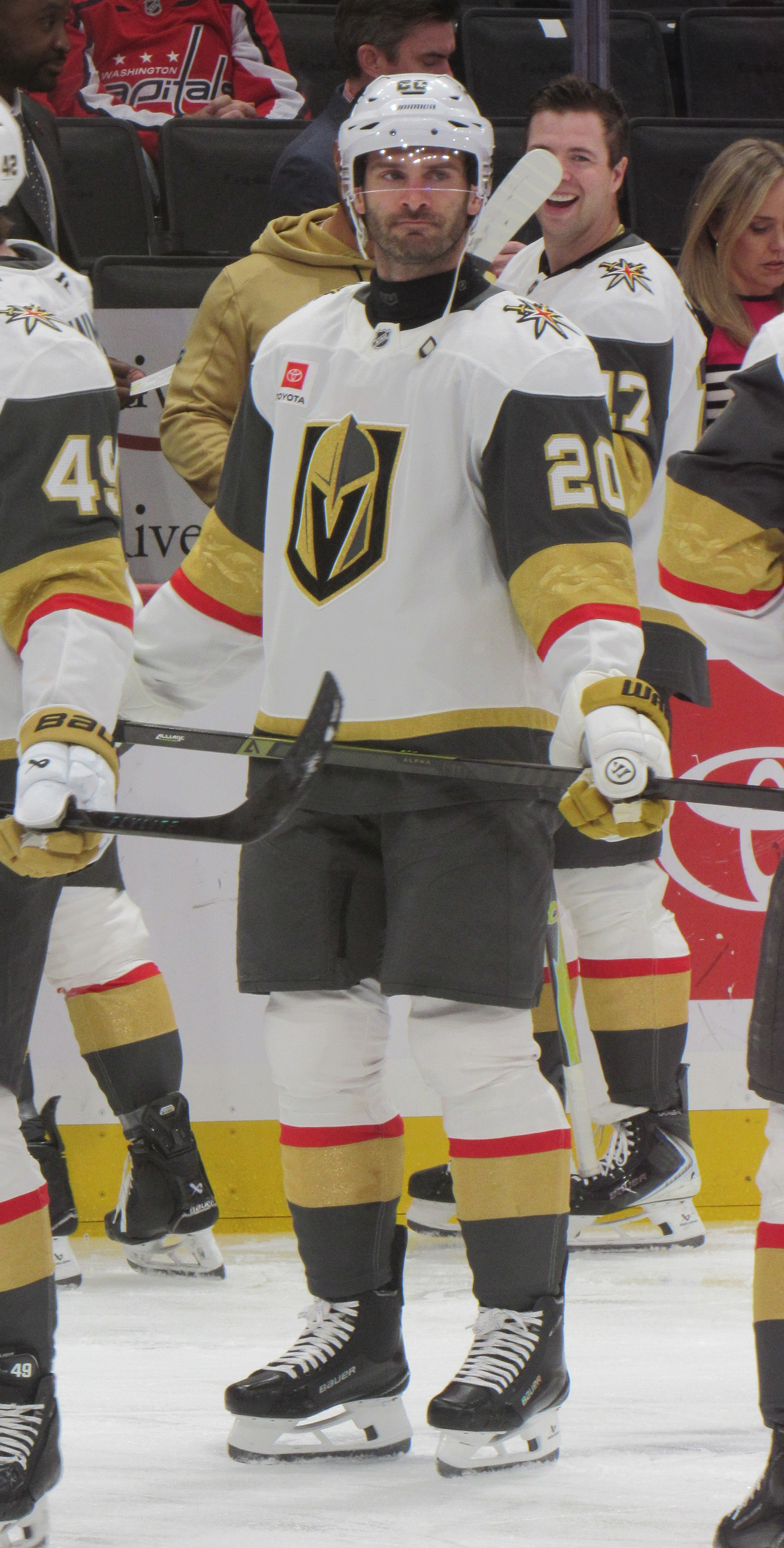
Saad with the Golden Knights in 2026

==== Vegas Golden Knights (2025–present) ====
Following his termination from the Blues, Saad signed a one-year pro-rated contract worth $1.5 million with the Vegas Golden Knights on January 31, 2025. He recorded three points, two goals and one assist, through his first five games with the Golden Knights. He played 29 games with the Golden Knights and scored six goals and eight assists en route to the 2025 Stanley Cup playoffs. While Saad recorded two assists to help the Golden Knights advance to the second round against the Edmonton Oilers, he suffered an injury in game two of their series.

Following the season, Saad signed a one-year extension worth $2 million to remain with Vegas, avoiding free agency. Saad struggled at the start of the 2025–26 season, recording no points through his first six games. However, after a promotion to the first line to fill in for the injured Mark Stone, Saad recorded his first point of the year against the Carolina Hurricanes, assisting on a Jack Eichel first-period goal in a 4–1 win.

== Career statistics ==
=== Regular season and playoffs ===
| | | | Regular season | | | | | Playoffs |
| Season | Team | League | GP | G | A | Pts | PIM | GP | G | A | Pts | PIM |
|---|---|---|---|---|---|---|---|---|---|---|---|---|
| 2008–09 | Mahoning Valley Phantoms | NAHL | 47 | 29 | 18 | 47 | 48 | 7 | 5 | 1 | 6 | 10 |
| 2009–10 | U.S. NTDP Juniors | USHL | 24 | 12 | 14 | 26 | 18 | — | — | — | — | — |
| 2009–10 | U.S. NTDP U18 | USDP | 39 | 17 | 15 | 32 | 34 | — | — | — | — | — |
| 2010–11 | Saginaw Spirit | OHL | 59 | 27 | 28 | 55 | 47 | 12 | 3 | 9 | 12 | 10 |
| 2011–12 | Saginaw Spirit | OHL | 44 | 34 | 42 | 76 | 38 | 12 | 8 | 9 | 17 | 4 |
| 2011–12 | Chicago Blackhawks | NHL | 2 | 0 | 0 | 0 | 0 | 2 | 0 | 1 | 1 | 0 |
| 2012–13 | Rockford IceHogs | AHL | 31 | 8 | 12 | 20 | 10 | — | — | — | — | — |
| 2012–13 | Chicago Blackhawks | NHL | 46 | 10 | 17 | 27 | 12 | 23 | 1 | 5 | 6 | 4 |
| 2013–14 | Chicago Blackhawks | NHL | 78 | 19 | 28 | 47 | 20 | 19 | 6 | 10 | 16 | 6 |
| 2014–15 | Chicago Blackhawks | NHL | 82 | 23 | 29 | 52 | 12 | 23 | 8 | 3 | 11 | 6 |
| 2015–16 | Columbus Blue Jackets | NHL | 78 | 31 | 22 | 53 | 14 | — | — | — | — | — |
| 2016–17 | Columbus Blue Jackets | NHL | 82 | 24 | 29 | 53 | 8 | 5 | 1 | 2 | 3 | 0 |
| 2017–18 | Chicago Blackhawks | NHL | 82 | 18 | 17 | 35 | 14 | — | — | — | — | — |
| 2018–19 | Chicago Blackhawks | NHL | 80 | 23 | 24 | 47 | 12 | — | — | — | — | — |
| 2019–20 | Chicago Blackhawks | NHL | 58 | 21 | 12 | 33 | 16 | 9 | 2 | 3 | 5 | 2 |
| 2020–21 | Colorado Avalanche | NHL | 44 | 15 | 9 | 24 | 12 | 10 | 7 | 1 | 8 | 12 |
| 2021–22 | St. Louis Blues | NHL | 78 | 24 | 25 | 49 | 10 | 12 | 2 | 3 | 5 | 4 |
| 2022–23 | St. Louis Blues | NHL | 71 | 19 | 18 | 37 | 12 | — | — | — | — | — |
| 2023–24 | St. Louis Blues | NHL | 82 | 26 | 16 | 42 | 20 | — | — | — | — | — |
| 2024–25 | St. Louis Blues | NHL | 43 | 7 | 9 | 16 | 6 | — | — | — | — | — |
| 2024–25 | Vegas Golden Knights | NHL | 29 | 6 | 8 | 14 | 0 | 8 | 0 | 2 | 2 | 2 |
| 2025–26 | Vegas Golden Knights | NHL | 49 | 3 | 6 | 9 | 14 | 5 | 0 | 2 | 2 | 0 |
| NHL totals | | | 984 | 269 | 269 | 538 | 182 | 116 | 27 | 32 | 59 | 36 |

=== International ===
Medal record

Men's ice hockey

Representing the United States

World U18 Championships
| Gold medal – first place | 2010 Belarus | |

| Year | Team | Event | Result | GP | G | A | Pts | PIM |
|---|---|---|---|---|---|---|---|---|
| 2009 | United States | U17 | 3rd place, bronze medalist(s) | 7 | 6 | 5 | 11 | 2 |
| 2010 | United States | U18 | 1st place, gold medalist(s) | 7 | 3 | 3 | 6 | 4 |
| 2012 | United States | WJC | 7th | 6 | 1 | 5 | 6 | 0 |
| 2016 | Team North America | WCH | 5th | 3 | 0 | 0 | 0 | 2 |
| Junior totals | | | | 20 | 10 | 13 | 23 | 6 |
| Senior totals | | | | 3 | 0 | 0 | 0 | 2 |

== Awards and honors ==
| Award | Year | Ref |
NAHL
| First All-Star Team | 2009 | |
| Rookie of the Year | 2009 | |
| All-Rookie Team | 2009 | |
OHL
| First All-Star Team | 2012 | |
| William Hanley Trophy | 2012 | |
AHL
| CCM/AHL Player of the Week (Jan. 13) | 2013 | |
NHL
| NHL All-Rookie Team | 2013 | |
| Stanley Cup champion | 2013, 2015 | |
| NHL All-Star Game | 2016 | |
International
| World U-17 Hockey Challenge Tournament All-Star Team | 2009 | |
