= Artem Anisimov =

Russian ice hockey player (born 1988)

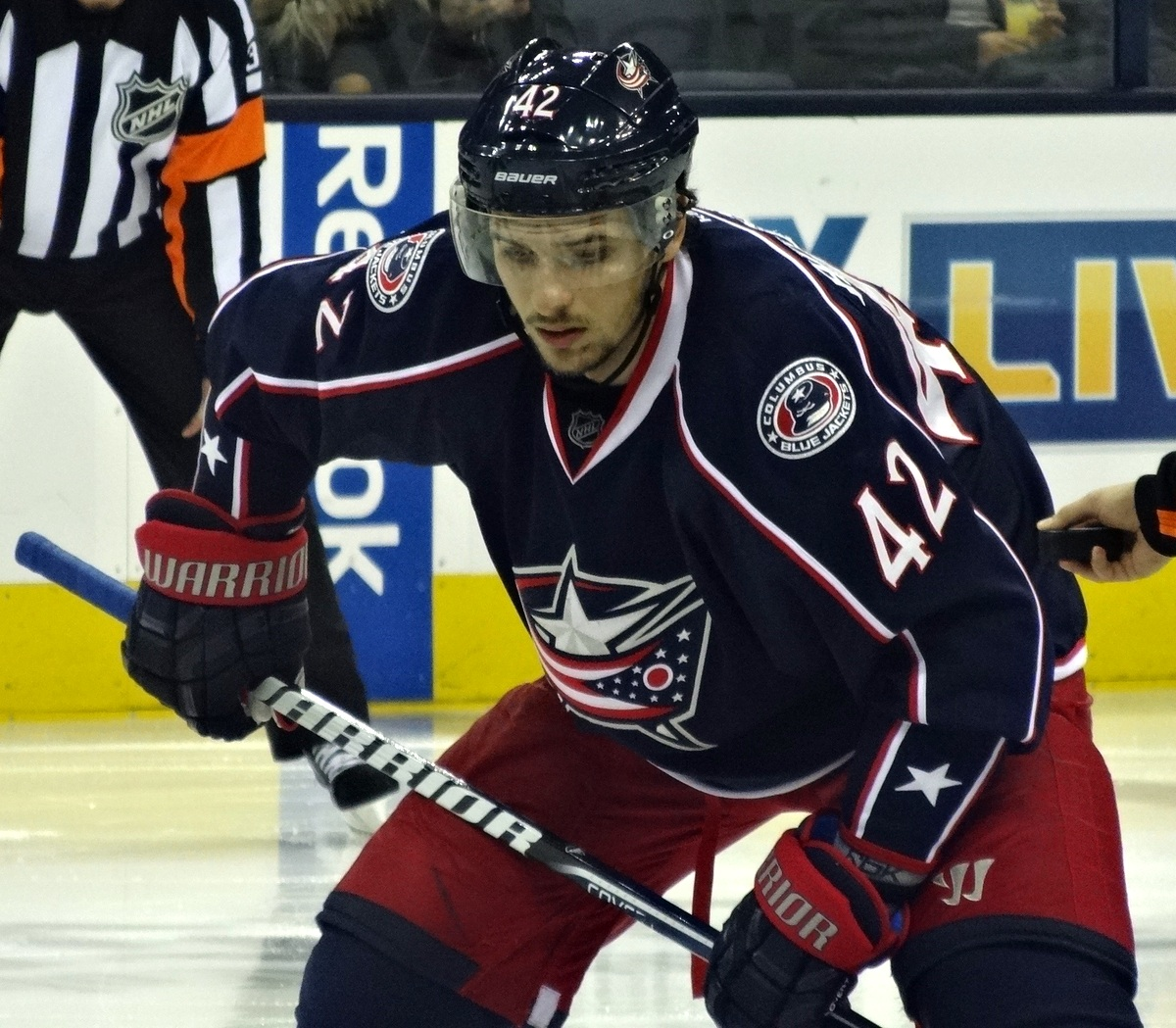
- Anisimov with the Columbus Blue Jackets in November 2013
- Born: 24 May 1988 (age 38) Yaroslavl, Russian SFSR, Soviet Union
- Height: 6 ft 4 in (193 cm)
- Weight: 198 lb (90 kg; 14 st 2 lb)
- Position: Forward
- Shot: Left
- Played for: Lokomotiv Yaroslavl; New York Rangers; Columbus Blue Jackets; Chicago Blackhawks; Ottawa Senators
- National team: Russia
- NHL draft: 54th overall, 2006; New York Rangers
- Playing career: 2005–2024

Artem Alekseevich Anisimov (Russian: Артём Алексеевич Анисимов; born 24 May 1988) is a Russian former professional ice hockey player. He played as a forward in the National Hockey League (NHL) for the New York Rangers, Columbus Blue Jackets, Chicago Blackhawks, and Ottawa Senators and Lokomotiv Yaroslavl of the Kontinental Hockey League. The Rangers originally selected him in the second round, 54th overall, of the 2006 NHL entry draft. In international play, Anisimov represented Russia at the 2014 Winter Olympics and the 2016 World Cup of Hockey and several world championships and world junior championships. He won one gold, three silver, and two bronze medals in his international career.

== Playing career ==
=== Russia ===
Anisimov is a product of the Lokomotiv Yaroslavl hockey school in Russia. He made his semi-professional debut for the organization's junior farm club, Lokomotiv-2, during the 2004–05 season before joining the senior team in the 2005–06 season. In ten games with Lokomotiv Yaroslavl, he went scoreless. He returned to Lokomotiv for the 2006–07 season, appearing in 39 games, scoring two goals and eight assists for ten points. The team made the playoffs and in seven playoff games, he added two goals and five points.

=== New York Rangers (2007–2012) ===
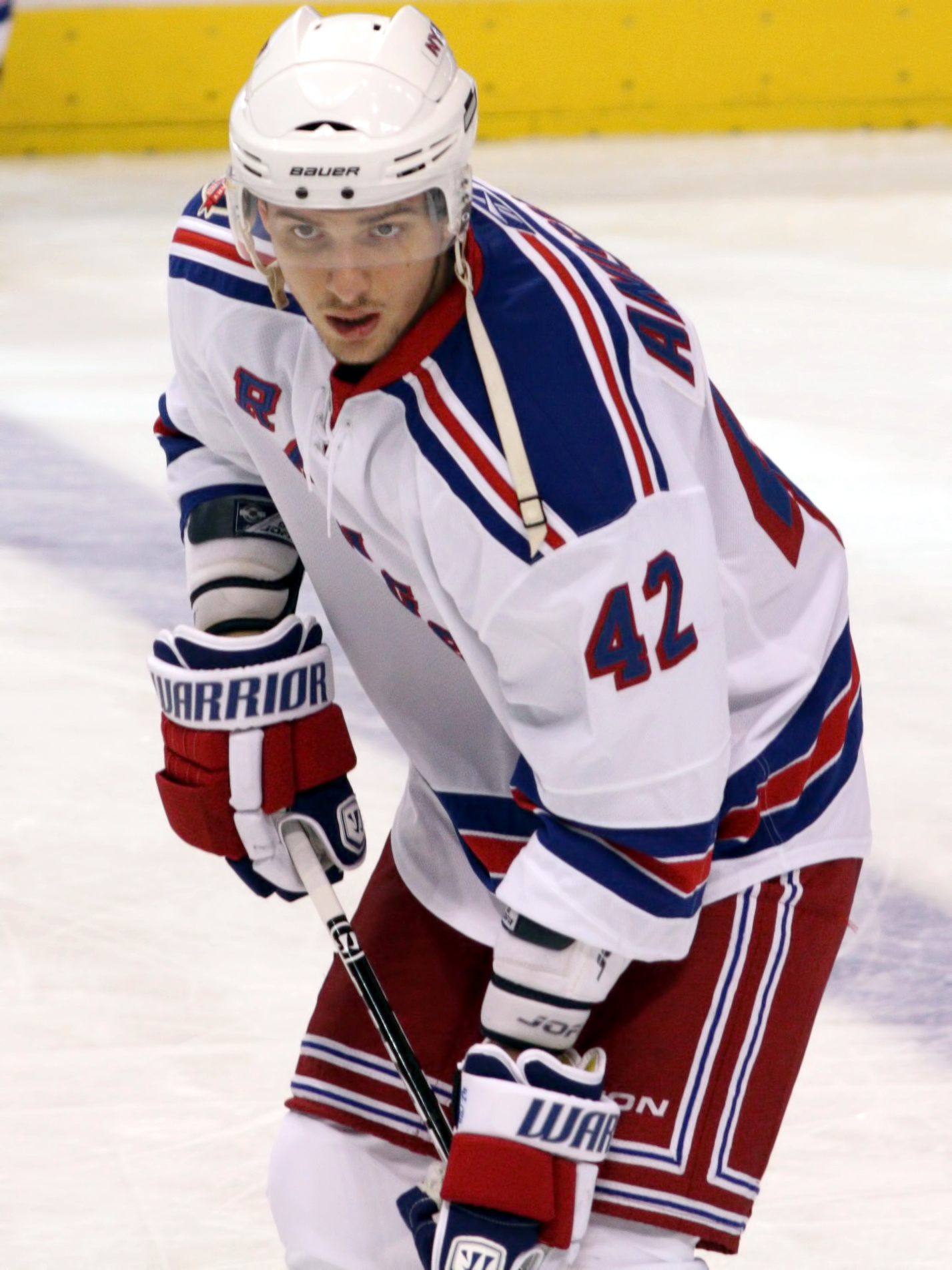
Anisimov while with the New York Rangers in January 2011

Anisimov was drafted in the second round, 54th overall, in the 2006 NHL entry draft by the New York Rangers. On 2 August 2007, Anisimov signed his first contract with the Rangers, He was to New York's American Hockey League (AHL) affiliate, the Hartford Wolf Pack to begin the 2007–08 season. In 74 games with Hartford, he recorded 16 goals and 43 points, helping the Wolf Pack finish second in their division and qualify for the playoffs. Hartford was eliminated in five games by the Portland Pirates in their first round best-of-seven series. Anisimov added one goal in the five games.

He was returned to Hartford for the 2008–09 season. On 23 January 2009, Anisimov was selected to participate in the 2009 AHL All-Star Classic in Worcester, Massachusetts, representing the PlanetUSA team. He scored one goal and assisted on two others, including the game-winner, in a 14–11 PlanetUSA victory over the Canadian All-Stars. On 1 February, Anisimov was called up to the Rangers for the first time in his career after scoring 21 goals and 29 assists for 50 points with the Wolf Pack. He made his NHL debut on 3 February against the Atlanta Thrashers at Madison Square Garden. He was returned to the AHL the following day. In 80 games with Hartford, he tallied 37 goals and 81 points, good for fifth in the AHL. The Wolf Pack made the playoffs again after finishing atop the AHL's Atlantic Division and faced the fourth-place Worcester Sharks in the opening round best-of-seven series. Worcester upset Hartford, winning in six games. Anisimov scored two goals in the six games. After Hartford was eliminated, Anisimov was recalled by the Rangers again on 27 April, and made his NHL playoff debut on 28 April in the Game 7 2–1 loss to the Washington Capitals.

Anisimov made the Rangers out of training camp for the 2009–10 season and recorded his first NHL point assisting on a goal by Aleš Kotalík in a 4–3 victory over the Washington Capitals on 8 October. He scored his first career NHL goal on 11 October, against goaltender Jean-Sébastien Giguère of the Anaheim Ducks, in a 3–0 Rangers victory. On 28 November, Anisimov was deliberately hit in the head by Matt Cooke of the Pittsburgh Penguins. Anisimov missed the rest of the game while Cooke received a two-game suspension. Anisimov appeared in all 82 games with New York, recording 12 goals and 28 points in his rookie season. He marked his first three-point game on 23 November, when he scored a goal and assisted on two others by Sean Avery and Matt Gilroy in a 7–4 victory over the Columbus Blue Jackets. Mid-season he went pointless in 17 games, leading to calls for his demotion to the AHL.

In the offseason Anisimov underwent surgery on his right wrist after injuring it on international duty. He returned to the Rangers for the 2010–11 season and was one of four players to appear in all 82 games. Centreing a line of Ryan Callahan and Brandon Dubinsky, the three were the best trio on the team, with Anisimov setting new career highs in goals (18), assists (26) and points (44). The Rangers qualified for the 2011 Stanley Cup playoffs and faced the Washington Capitals in the opening round best-of-seven series. The Capitals moved past the Rangers in five games, with Anisimov marking one goal.

On 8 July 2011, Anisimov, a restricted free agent, re-signed with the Rangers on a two-year, $3.75 million contract. Anisimov played in 79 games for the Rangers, tallying 16 goals and 36 points. He went on a 17-game pointless streak midseason, breaking the streak by scoring against the Philadelphia Flyers on 5 February 2012. He added two assists, setting up goals by Marián Gáborík and Michael Del Zotto to record his second career three-point game. The Rangers finished first in the Eastern Conference and made the 2012 playoffs. The Rangers advanced to the Eastern Conference final, but were beat by the New Jersey Devils to finish their season. In 20 playoff games, Anisimov scored three goals and ten points.

=== Columbus Blue Jackets (2012–2015) ===
Just one season into his contract, Anisimov, along with forward Brandon Dubinsky, defenceman Tim Erixon, and a first-round draft pick in 2013, were traded to the Columbus Blue Jackets in exchange for star forward Rick Nash, defenceman Steven Delisle and a 2013 conditional third-round pick. With the season delayed by the 2012–13 NHL lockout, Anisimov returned to his former Russian team, Lokomotiv (now of the Kontinental Hockey League (KHL)) during the labour action, alongside fellow NHLers Semyon Varlamov and Dmitry Kulikov. In 36 games with Yaroslavl, Anisimov recorded 12 goals and 29 points before returning to North America for the resumption of the 2012–13 season. He made his debut for Columbus on 19 January 2013, and scored his first goal for the team in a 3–2 shootout victory over the Nashville Predators. On 21 February, in a game against the Detroit Red Wings, Anisimov was struck high in a collision with Detroit defenceman Kyle Quincey. Anisimov was taken off the ice on a stretcher and taken to hospital as a precaution. On 28 March, he marked a three-point game, scoring one goal and assisting on two others by Matt Calvert and Cam Atkinson in a 6–4 loss to the Edmonton Oilers. In April, he missed five games with a concussion. He spent most of the year on a line with Calvert and Atkinson. However, after Columbus acquired Marián Gáborík from the Rangers in April, Anisimov centred his line alongside Václav Prospal. He finished the season with 11 goals and 18 points in 35 games with Columbus.

On 26 June 2013, Anisimov signed a three-year contract extension with the Blue Jackets at an annual average value of $3.28 million. Anisimov played on the top line with Gáborík and Nick Foligno on his wings during the 2013–14 season, but were not a successful trio, with head coach Todd Richards struggling to find a spot for Gáborík. He finished the season with a new career-high in goals with 22, and 39 points in 81 games. Nevertheless, the Blue Jackets made the playoffs and faced the Pittsburgh Penguins in the opening round. The Blue Jackets were eliminated by the Penguins in six games, with Anisimov adding one goal and three points in the series.

Anisimov's 2014–15 season was spent mainly injured. On 28 October 2014, Anisimov suffered a concussion that caused him to miss seven games. On 1 December, it was announced that he had suffered a torn triceps muscle in a game against the Nashville Predators. He returned to the lineup on 29 January 2015 after missing 23 games. He finished the season with seven goals and 27 points in 52 games.

=== Chicago Blackhawks (2015–2019) ===
On 30 June 2015, Anisimov, along with Jeremy Morin, Marko Daňo and Corey Tropp, were traded to the Chicago Blackhawks in exchange for Brandon Saad, Alex Broadhurst and Michael Paliotta. The next day, on 1 July, Anisimov agreed to a five-year, $22.75 million contract extension with Chicago. His existing contract was set to expire after the 2015–16 season. He made his debut with the Blackhawks in the season opening 3–2 loss against the New York Rangers on 7 October. On 9 October, Anisimov scored his first goal as a Blackhawk and the first goal in the first regular season game at Barclays Center against Thomas Greiss of the New York Islanders. The Blackhawks won 3–2 in overtime. He marked a four-point game on 6 February 2016, scoring one goal and assisting on three others by Brent Seabrook, Trevor van Riemsdyk, and Patrick Kane in a 5–1 victory over the Dallas Stars. Playing on a line with Kane and Artemi Panarin, he recorded a three-point game on 3 April, scoring one goal and assisting on two others by his linemates in a 6–4 win over the Boston Bruins. In his first year with the Blackhawks, he produced 20 goals and 22 assists for 42 points in 77 games as the defending Stanley Cup champion Blackhawks lost in seven games in the first round of the 2016 playoffs to the St. Louis Blues. After the end of the season, Anisimov underwent wrist surgery.

Heading into the 2016–17 season, the Blackhawks' top line (and one of the best in the league) consisted of Kane, Anisimov, and Panarin. However, head coach Joel Quenneville contemplated breaking up the line in order to spread their scoring throughout the lineup, eventually putting Anisimov on a line with Kane and Tyler Motte. On 18 October, Anisimov, reunited with Panarin and Kane, tallied four points in a 7–4 win over the Philadelphia Flyers. He scored twice and assisted on goals by Kane and Marián Hossa, which was the 500th goal of his career. However, with the Blackhawks struggling to score, Kane was moved off Anisimov's line and instead, Anisimov centred Panarin and Hossa. In 64 games, Anisimov tied his career-high in goals with 22 and set a new career-high in points with 45. On 14 March 2017, Anisimov got tangled up with Montreal Canadiens forward Alexander Radulov and suffered a leg injury that caused him to miss the remainder of the regular season. He returned for the postseason and his spot between Kane and Panarin. The Blackhawks faced the Nashville Predators in the first round. The Blackhawks who finished atop the Western Conference, were upset by the Predators, being swept in four games in their best-of-seven series. Anisimov went scoreless for the Blackhawks.

In the 2017 offseason, the Blackhawks traded Panarin to the Columbus Blue Jackets for Brandon Saad, breaking up their most successful line. Anisimov centred the third line to begin the 2017–18 season, but after the team's poor start, he returned to Kane's line alongside Nick Schmaltz. On 15 November, Anisimov scored his first NHL hat-trick in a 6–3 win over his former team, the New York Rangers. By December he was leading the team in goals, with the entire line atop the team's scoring. On 28 December, Anisimov suffered an upper body injury in a game against the Vancouver Canucks. He missed ten games with the injury, returning on 22 January. He saw his production decline as he spent less time on the second line, playing with Alex DeBrincat, Patrick Sharp, and Tomáš Jurčo. He finished the season with 20 goals and 31 points in 72 games.

Anisimov began the 2018–19 season centreing the third line again, but after coach Quenneville became unhappy with Saad on Kane and Schmaltz's line, Anisimov was quickly returned to his spot on the second line. On 27 October, Anisimov tallied three points, scoring one goal and assisting on two others by Kane in a 7–3 loss to the St. Louis Blues. With the Blackhawks struggling, the team fired Quenneville, replacing him with Jeremy Colliton on 6 November. In 78 games, he scored 15 goals and 37 points as the Blackhawks failed to make the postseason for the second straight year.

=== Ottawa Senators (2019–2021) ===
After four seasons with the Blackhawks, Anisimov was traded to the Ottawa Senators in exchange for forward Zack Smith on 16 July 2019. He was placed on the third line with Tyler Ennis and Drake Batherson to start the season and had a terrible first game with the Senators, on the ice for three goals against in a 5–3 loss to the Toronto Maple Leafs on 2 October. He recorded his first goal with the Senators on 10 October in a 6–4 loss to the St. Louis Blues. On 23 October, Anisimov was placed on the injured reserve list, having a lower body injury. He returned to the lineup on 5 November, centreing a line of Ennis and Bobby Ryan, in a 4–1 loss to the New York Islanders. but on 8 November, Anisimov was placed on the injured reserve list, having re-aggravated his groin injury. He returned to the lineup on 29 November, on a line with Ennis and Connor Brown. Anisimov posted 15 goals and 20 points in 2019–20, his first season with Ottawa, before the NHL suspended play due to the COVID-19 pandemic on 12 March 2020.

Anisimov struggled to stay healthy during the pandemic-shortened 2020–21 season and was placed on waivers after registering only four points in 14 games for the Senators on 29 March 2021. He went unclaimed and remained with the team. On 3 April, he recorded a three-point game, assisting on goals by Evgenii Dadonov and Alex Formenton. On 24 April, Anisimov suited up as an emergency goaltender during a game against the Vancouver Canucks but did not play. He finished the season posting two goals and nine points through 19 games.

=== Later years ===
As a free agent after two seasons with the Senators, Anisimov remained un-signed over the summer leading into the 2021–22 season. On 9 September 2021, he accepted an invitation to attend the Colorado Avalanche 2021 training camp on a professional tryout (PTO) contract. Following training camp and featuring in pre-season games with the contending Avalanche, Anisimov was released without a contract from Colorado on 8 October. Returning to his native Russia, Anisimov linked up with his original hometown club, Lokomotiv Yaroslavl of the KHL, for the remainder of the season on 20 October. As an alternate captain, Anisimov was leaned upon offensively and responded with eight goals and 19 points through 27 regular season games. He added three points in four post-season games before Lokomotiv were eliminated in the conference quarterfinals at the hands of CSKA Moscow.

As a free agent and with ambitions to return to the NHL, Anisimov for a second consecutive season accepted a PTO by joining the Philadelphia Flyers 2022 training camp and pre-season. Upon suffering an injury through training camp, Anisimov remained within the organization to start the 2022–23 season and after returning to health was later signed to a PTO with their AHL affiliate, the Lehigh Valley Phantoms, on 15 November 2022. Anisimov tallied four points through his first six appearances with the Phantoms and on 10 December 2022 was signed to a AHL contract for the remainder of the season. In 55 games with Lehigh Valley, he recorded 19 goals and 36 points. Lehigh Valley qualified for the playoffs and but were eliminated by the Charlotte Checkers in their first round best-of-three series. In three games, Anisimov added one goal and two points.

Ahead of the 2023–24 season, Anisimov signed another PTO, this time with the Detroit Red Wings, on 19 September 2023. However, he was released from his PTO by Detroit on 4 October. Anisimov opted to extend his professional career by returning to the Hartford Wolf Pack of the AHL during the 2023–24 AHL season on 2 January 2024. He made 18 appearances with the Wolf Pack, registering one goal and four points, before he was released from his professional tryout on 20 February 2024. Anisimov announced his retirement from hockey on 8 October 2024.

== International play ==
Medal record

Men's ice hockey

Representing Russia

World Championships
| Gold medal – first place | 2014 Belarus | |
| Silver medal – second place | 2010 Germany | |
| Silver medal – second place | 2015 Czech Republic | |
| Bronze medal – third place | 2019 Slovakia | |

World Junior Championships
| Silver medal – second place | 2007 Sweden | |
| Bronze medal – third place | 2008 Czech Republic | |

Anisimov was selected to play for Russia's junior team at the 2007 World Junior Ice Hockey Championships, appearing in six games, scoring two goals and three points. Russia won the silver medal at the tournament. He rejoined the team for the 2008 World Juniors, which won the bronze medal in a 4–2 victory over the United States.

He represented Russia six times at world championships, winning a gold medal in 2014, silver medals in 2010 and 2015 and bronze in 2019. He also played for Russia at the 2013 and 2018 world championships. In 2014, Anisimov was selected to play for Russia at the 2014 Olympic Games. In 2016, he was named to Russia's roster for the 2016 World Cup of Hockey.

== Personal life ==
Anisimov and his wife Ksenia have three children: a daughter and two sons.

== Career statistics ==
=== Regular season and playoffs ===
| | | | Regular season | | | | | Playoffs |
| Season | Team | League | GP | G | A | Pts | PIM | GP | G | A | Pts | PIM |
|---|---|---|---|---|---|---|---|---|---|---|---|---|
| 2004–05 | Lokomotiv–2 Yaroslavl | RUS.3 | 24 | 3 | 5 | 8 | 10 | — | — | — | — | — |
| 2005–06 | Lokomotiv Yaroslavl | RSL | 10 | 0 | 1 | 1 | 4 | — | — | — | — | — |
| 2005–06 | Lokomotiv–2 Yaroslavl | RUS.3 | 32 | 15 | 12 | 27 | 28 | — | — | — | — | — |
| 2006–07 | Lokomotiv Yaroslavl | RSL | 39 | 2 | 8 | 10 | 26 | 7 | 3 | 2 | 5 | 4 |
| 2006–07 | Lokomotiv–2 Yaroslavl | RUS.3 | 2 | 2 | 0 | 2 | 0 | — | — | — | — | — |
| 2007–08 | Hartford Wolf Pack | AHL | 74 | 16 | 27 | 43 | 30 | 5 | 1 | 0 | 1 | 2 |
| 2008–09 | Hartford Wolf Pack | AHL | 80 | 37 | 44 | 81 | 50 | 6 | 2 | 0 | 2 | 0 |
| 2008–09 | New York Rangers | NHL | 1 | 0 | 0 | 0 | 0 | 1 | 0 | 0 | 0 | 0 |
| 2009–10 | New York Rangers | NHL | 82 | 12 | 16 | 28 | 32 | — | — | — | — | — |
| 2010–11 | New York Rangers | NHL | 82 | 18 | 26 | 44 | 20 | 5 | 1 | 0 | 1 | 0 |
| 2011–12 | New York Rangers | NHL | 79 | 16 | 20 | 36 | 34 | 20 | 3 | 7 | 10 | 4 |
| 2012–13 | Lokomotiv Yaroslavl | KHL | 36 | 12 | 17 | 29 | 34 | — | — | — | — | — |
| 2012–13 | Columbus Blue Jackets | NHL | 35 | 11 | 7 | 18 | 12 | — | — | — | — | — |
| 2013–14 | Columbus Blue Jackets | NHL | 81 | 22 | 17 | 39 | 20 | 6 | 1 | 2 | 3 | 4 |
| 2014–15 | Columbus Blue Jackets | NHL | 52 | 7 | 20 | 27 | 8 | — | — | — | — | — |
| 2015–16 | Chicago Blackhawks | NHL | 77 | 20 | 22 | 42 | 12 | 7 | 3 | 0 | 3 | 2 |
| 2016–17 | Chicago Blackhawks | NHL | 64 | 22 | 23 | 45 | 30 | 4 | 0 | 0 | 0 | 0 |
| 2017–18 | Chicago Blackhawks | NHL | 72 | 20 | 11 | 31 | 22 | — | — | — | — | — |
| 2018–19 | Chicago Blackhawks | NHL | 78 | 15 | 22 | 37 | 14 | — | — | — | — | — |
| 2019–20 | Ottawa Senators | NHL | 49 | 15 | 5 | 20 | 8 | — | — | — | — | — |
| 2020–21 | Ottawa Senators | NHL | 19 | 2 | 7 | 9 | 2 | — | — | — | — | — |
| 2021–22 | Lokomotiv Yaroslavl | KHL | 27 | 8 | 11 | 19 | 8 | 4 | 1 | 2 | 3 | 2 |
| 2022–23 | Lehigh Valley Phantoms | AHL | 55 | 19 | 17 | 36 | 2 | 3 | 1 | 1 | 2 | 0 |
| 2023–24 | Hartford Wolf Pack | AHL | 18 | 1 | 3 | 4 | 6 | — | — | — | — | — |
| NHL totals | | | 771 | 180 | 196 | 376 | 214 | 43 | 8 | 9 | 17 | 10 |
| KHL totals | | | 63 | 20 | 28 | 48 | 30 | 4 | 1 | 2 | 3 | 2 |

=== International ===
| Year | Team | Event | Result | GP | G | A | Pts | PIM |
|---|---|---|---|---|---|---|---|---|
| 2006 | Russia | WJC18 | 5th | 6 | 3 | 2 | 5 | 2 |
| 2007 | Russia | WJC | 2nd place, silver medalist(s) | 6 | 2 | 1 | 3 | 4 |
| 2008 | Russia | WJC | 3rd place, bronze medalist(s) | 7 | 1 | 3 | 4 | 6 |
| 2010 | Russia | WC | 2nd place, silver medalist(s) | 9 | 1 | 2 | 3 | 6 |
| 2013 | Russia | WC | 6th | 8 | 0 | 1 | 1 | 6 |
| 2014 | Russia | OG | 5th | 5 | 0 | 0 | 0 | 2 |
| 2014 | Russia | WC | 1st place, gold medalist(s) | 10 | 1 | 3 | 4 | 2 |
| 2015 | Russia | WC | 2nd place, silver medalist(s) | 10 | 1 | 3 | 4 | 4 |
| 2016 | Russia | WCH | 4th | 4 | 0 | 1 | 1 | 2 |
| 2018 | Russia | WC | 6th | 8 | 3 | 5 | 8 | 0 |
| 2019 | Russia | WC | 3rd place, bronze medalist(s) | 10 | 4 | 2 | 6 | 4 |
| Junior totals | | | | 19 | 6 | 6 | 12 | 12 |
| Senior totals | | | | 64 | 10 | 17 | 27 | 26 |

== Bibliography ==
- Chaimovitch, Jason, ed. (2025). 2025–2026 American Hockey League Official Guide & Record Book. Springfield, Massachusetts: American Hockey League. OCLC 22147888.
