= Corey Tropp =

American ice hockey player (born 1989)

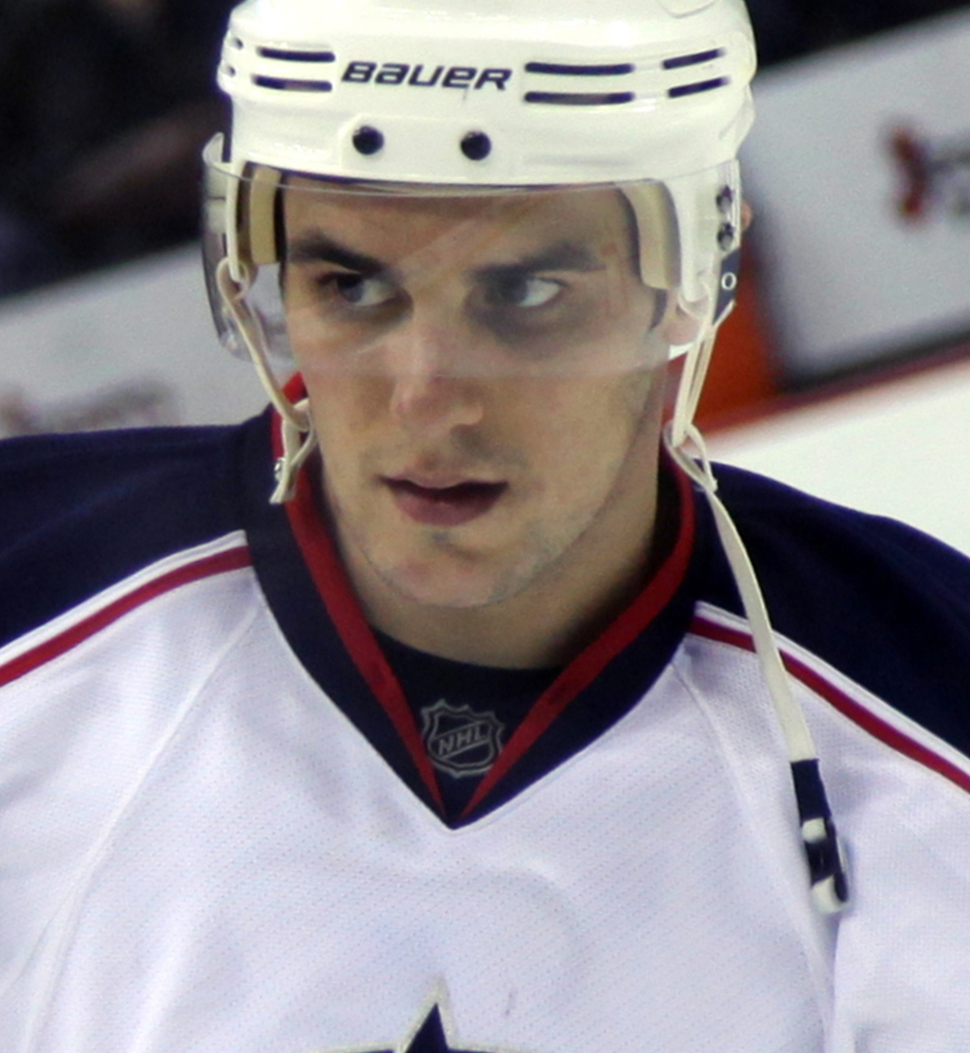
- Born: July 25, 1989 (age 37) Grosse Pointe Woods, Michigan, U.S.
- Height: 5 ft 11 in (180 cm)
- Weight: 185 lb (84 kg; 13 st 3 lb)
- Position: Right wing
- Shot: Right
- Played for: Buffalo Sabres; Columbus Blue Jackets; Anaheim Ducks; Straubing Tigers; Vienna Capitals
- NHL draft: 89th overall, 2007; Buffalo Sabres
- Playing career: 2010–2022

Corey Tropp (born July 25, 1989) is an American former professional ice hockey player. He played in the National Hockey League (NHL) for the Anaheim Ducks, Columbus Blue Jackets and Buffalo Sabres, the latter of which drafted him in the third round, 89th overall, of the 2007 NHL entry draft.

== Playing career ==
Tropp played three seasons (2007–10) of college ice hockey at Michigan State University with the Michigan State Spartans in the CCHA at the NCAA Division I level.

Tropp was honored for his outstanding college play when he was named to the CCHA Second All-Star Team in his final year.

On November 4, 2011, Tropp made his NHL debut against the Calgary Flames. Tropp became one of just eight NHL players to wear the number 78. The other seven players were Pavol Demitra for the Ottawa Senators (1993–96), Benn Ferriero for the San Jose Sharks (2009–12), Evgeny Grachev (2012) and Beau Bennett (2017–18) for the St. Louis Blues, Eric Landry for the Montreal Canadiens (2000–02), Marc-Antoine Pouliot for the Edmonton Oilers (2006–08) and Mike York of the Columbus Blue Jackets (2008–09). He scored his first NHL goal in his third game on November 8, 2011, against Ondřej Pavelec of the Winnipeg Jets.

On September 22, 2013, in a pre-season game against the Toronto Maple Leafs, Tropp fought and was knocked-out by Maple Leafs' forward Jamie Devane, resulting in a broken jaw and a mild concussion. On November 27, 2013, the Sabres waived Tropp and on November 28, he was claimed by the Columbus Blue Jackets.

On June 30, 2015, Tropp (along with Jeremy Morin, Marko Daňo and Artem Anisimov) were traded to the Chicago Blackhawks in exchange for Brandon Saad, Alex Broadhurst and Michael Paliotta. After attending the Blackhawks' training camp, Tropp was reassigned to their American Hockey League (AHL) affiliate, the Rockford IceHogs. Despite attending the IceHogs' training camp, due to an overload of contract with the Blackhawks, Tropp was reassigned to the Albany Devils to begin the 2015–16 AHL season. Tropp enjoyed a productive tenure with Albany, scoring 28 points in 51 games before on February 29, 2016, he was traded to the Anaheim Ducks in exchange for Tim Jackman and a seventh-round draft pick in the 2017 NHL entry draft. He was immediately assigned to the Ducks' AHL affiliate, the San Diego Gulls.

After completing his contract with the Ducks following the 2017–18 season, Tropp opted to remain with the San Diego Gulls, agreeing to a one-year AHL contract as a free agent on July 23, 2018.

Leaving the Gulls as the franchise leading scorer after five seasons, Tropp belatedly signed as a free agent to join German outfit, the Straubing Tigers of the Deutsche Eishockey Liga, for the remainder of the 2020–21 season on January 21, 2021. After posting 19 points in 27 games during his tenure with Straubing, Tropp remained in Europe following the conclusion of his contract and agreed to a one-year deal with Austrian club, Vienna Capitals of the ICEHL, on July 12, 2021.

== Career statistics ==
| | | | Regular season | | | | | Playoffs |
| Season | Team | League | GP | G | A | Pts | PIM | GP | G | A | Pts | PIM |
|---|---|---|---|---|---|---|---|---|---|---|---|---|
| 2005–06 | Sioux Falls Stampede | USHL | 46 | 7 | 8 | 15 | 21 | 14 | 2 | 3 | 5 | 8 |
| 2006–07 | Sioux Falls Stampede | USHL | 54 | 26 | 36 | 62 | 76 | 8 | 4 | 9 | 13 | 0 |
| 2007–08 | Michigan State University | CCHA | 42 | 6 | 11 | 17 | 16 | — | — | — | — | — |
| 2008–09 | Michigan State University | CCHA | 21 | 3 | 8 | 11 | 45 | — | — | — | — | — |
| 2009–10 | Michigan State University | CCHA | 37 | 20 | 22 | 42 | 50 | — | — | — | — | — |
| 2010–11 | Portland Pirates | AHL | 76 | 10 | 30 | 40 | 113 | 12 | 2 | 5 | 7 | 12 |
| 2011–12 | Rochester Americans | AHL | 27 | 9 | 13 | 22 | 46 | 3 | 0 | 0 | 0 | 8 |
| 2011–12 | Buffalo Sabres | NHL | 34 | 3 | 5 | 8 | 20 | — | — | — | — | — |
| 2012–13 | Rochester Americans | AHL | 6 | 2 | 2 | 4 | 7 | — | — | — | — | — |
| 2013–14 | Buffalo Sabres | NHL | 9 | 0 | 1 | 1 | 0 | — | — | — | — | — |
| 2013–14 | Columbus Blue Jackets | NHL | 44 | 2 | 8 | 10 | 37 | 2 | 0 | 0 | 0 | 0 |
| 2014–15 | Columbus Blue Jackets | NHL | 61 | 1 | 7 | 8 | 76 | — | — | — | — | — |
| 2015–16 | Albany Devils | AHL | 51 | 11 | 17 | 28 | 61 | — | — | — | — | — |
| 2015–16 | San Diego Gulls | AHL | 15 | 5 | 6 | 11 | 16 | 8 | 1 | 1 | 2 | 20 |
| 2016–17 | San Diego Gulls | AHL | 62 | 21 | 33 | 54 | 48 | 1 | 0 | 0 | 0 | 0 |
| 2016–17 | Anaheim Ducks | NHL | 1 | 0 | 0 | 0 | 0 | — | — | — | — | — |
| 2017–18 | San Diego Gulls | AHL | 50 | 17 | 26 | 43 | 119 | — | — | — | — | — |
| 2018–19 | San Diego Gulls | AHL | 55 | 20 | 20 | 40 | 124 | 15 | 4 | 2 | 6 | 11 |
| 2019–20 | San Diego Gulls | AHL | 23 | 1 | 8 | 9 | 51 | — | — | — | — | — |
| 2020–21 | Straubing Tigers | DEL | 27 | 8 | 11 | 19 | 50 | 3 | 1 | 2 | 3 | 2 |
| 2021–22 | Vienna Capitals | ICEHL | 4 | 0 | 3 | 3 | 4 | — | — | — | — | — |
| NHL totals | | | 149 | 6 | 21 | 27 | 133 | 2 | 0 | 0 | 0 | 0 |

== Awards and honors ==
| Award | Year |
|---|---|
College
| All-CCHA Second Team | 2009–10 |
