= Ian McCoshen =

American ice hockey player

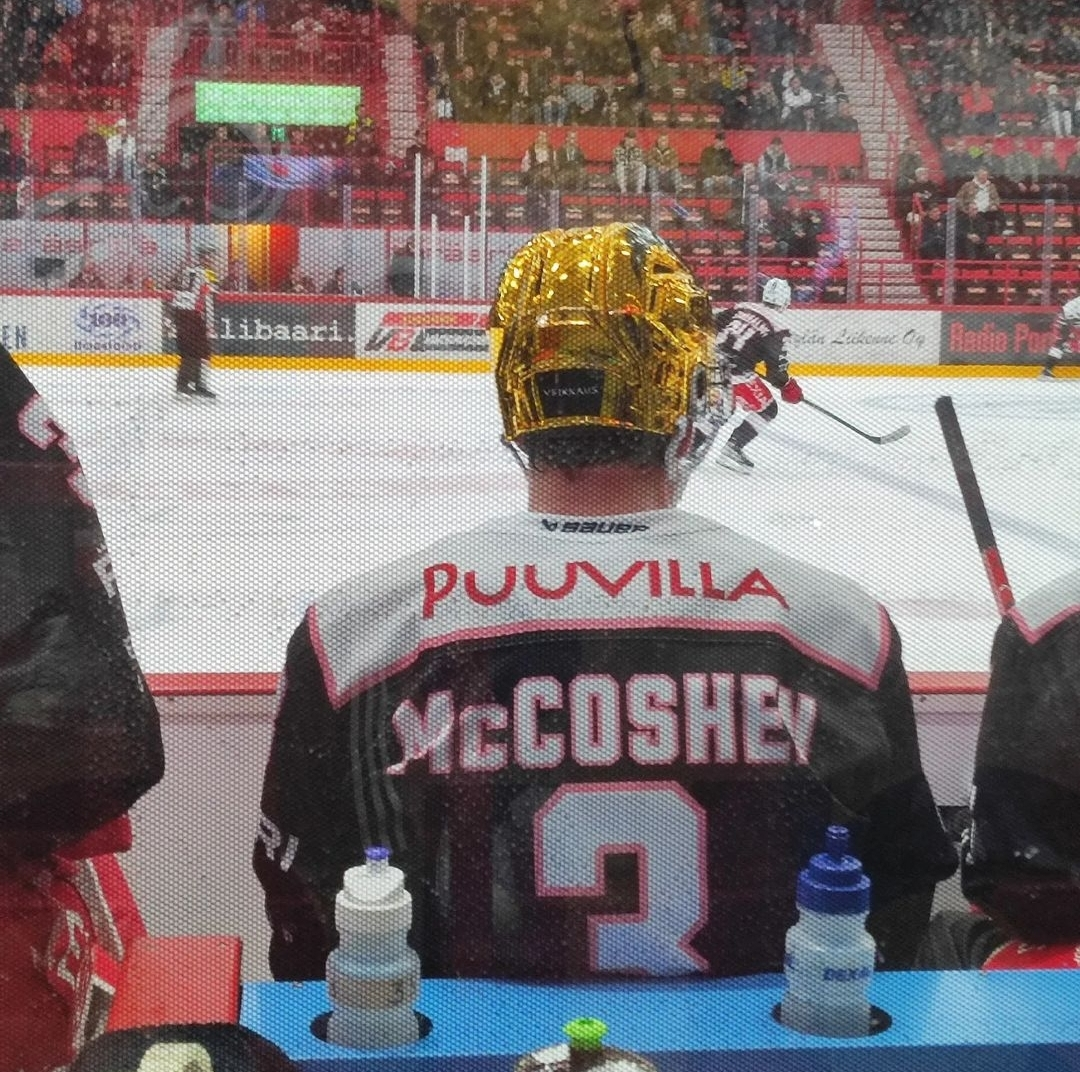
- Ian McCoshen with Porin Ässät in 2022
- Born: August 5, 1995 (age 30) Anaheim, California, U.S.
- Height: 6 ft 3 in (191 cm)
- Weight: 218 lb (99 kg; 15 st 8 lb)
- Position: Defense
- Shoots: Left
- KHL team Former teams: Barys Astana; Florida Panthers; Porin Ässät; HC Bílí Tygři Liberec; Kunlun Red Star
- NHL draft: 31st overall, 2013; Florida Panthers
- Playing career: 2016–present

Ian James McCoshen (born August 5, 1995) is an American professional ice hockey defenseman who is currently under contract with Barys Astana of the Kontinental Hockey League (KHL). McCoshen was selected by the Florida Panthers in the second round, 31st overall, of the 2013 NHL entry draft.

== Playing career ==
=== Amateur ===
==== Youth ====
As a youth, McCoshen played in the 2007 Quebec International Pee-Wee Hockey Tournament with a minor ice hockey team from Minnesota.

==== High school ====
McCoshen played three seasons (2010–13) of Tier 1 junior ice hockey with the Waterloo Black Hawks of the United States Hockey League (USHL). He was selected to both the 2012 and 2013 USHL/NHL Top Prospects Game, and in his final season, he was further recognized for his outstanding play when he was named to the 2012–13 USHL First All-Star Team.

==== College ====
McCoshen got off to a strong start in his NCAA campaign at Boston College with a 13-point year as a top defensemen for the Eagles ice hockey team. He scored Boston College's first goal of the season and was on SportsCenter's Top-10 plays for his goal-saving effort in a game against the University of Minnesota. He also earned rookie of the week honors for his game-winning goal against the University of Massachusetts Lowell during the NCAA tournament. McCoshen played at the 2014 World Juniors for the United States.

=== Professional ===
==== Florida Panthers ====
At the completion of his junior year with the Eagles in 2015–16, McCoshen concluded his collegiate career in signing a three-year, entry-level contract with the Florida Panthers on June 19, 2016.

McCoshen finished his first professional season skating in three NHL games, his NHL debut coming on April 6, 2017, in a 6–3 loss to the St. Louis Blues. He also recorded his first point (an assist) in the game.

==== Chicago Blackhawks ====
On October 22, 2019, McCoshen was traded by the Panthers to the Chicago Blackhawks in exchange for Aleksi Saarela. He was assigned to report to the Blackhawks AHL affiliate, the Rockford IceHogs. Unable to earn a recalled to the Blackhawks, McCoshen remained with the IceHogs, posting 2 goals and 8 points in 56 games before the season was cancelled due to the COVID-19 pandemic.

As an impending restricted free agent, McCoshen was non-tendered a qualifying offer by the Blackhawks, and was released to free agency on October 8, 2020.

==== Minnesota Wild ====
On October 19, 2020, McCoshen agree to a one-year, two-way contract with the Minnesota Wild. McCoshen was assigned to the AHL and played exclusively with affiliate, the Iowa Wild for the 2020–21 season, collecting 4 assists through 11 contests.

==== Later years ====
As a free agent from the Wild, McCoshen was un-signed over the summer before accepting an invitation to attend the Vegas Golden Knights 2021 training camp in preparation for the 2021–22 season. After participating in training camp and pre-season, McCoshen was re-assigned to join AHL affiliate, the Henderson Silver Knights on a professional tryout basis on October 2, 2021.

As a free agent from the Silver Knights in the following off-season, McCoshen signed his first contract abroad in agreeing to a one-year contract in Finland with Ässät of the Liiga on August 15, 2022. McCoshen played 59 regular season games in an Ässät jersey only missing one game. He scored 7 goals and 21 assists and a total of 28 points. McCoshen appeared in 8 playoff games and put up 4 points which were all assists.

After a lone season with HC Bílí Tygři Liberec of the Czech Extraliga in 2023–24, McCoshen continued his career abroad in joining Chinese based Kunlun Red Star of the KHL, on May 31, 2024.

McCoshen played in a single season with Kunlun, leaving the Chinese club at the conclusion of his contract to continue in the KHL with Barys Astana, signing a one-year deal on August 13, 2025.

== Personal ==
McCoshen is the son of Kevin and Colleen McCoshen. Kevin graduated from Superior Senior High School in Wisconsin, and Colleen is originally from Menomonie, Wisconsin. Ian also has three younger sisters: Mary, Allyson and Grace. McCoshen was born in Anaheim, California, and the family lived in Hudson, Wisconsin, for 13 years before moving for Faribault, Minnesota, where he attended Shattuck-Saint Mary's and skated for the school's bantam team in 2009–10.

== Career statistics ==
=== Regular season and playoffs ===
			Regular season					Playoffs
Season	Team	League	GP	G	A	Pts	PIM	GP	G	A	Pts	PIM
2010–11	Waterloo Black Hawks	USHL	42	0	6	6	38	2	0	0	0	0
2011–12	Waterloo Black Hawks	USHL	55	8	12	20	43	15	4	3	7	6
2012–13	Waterloo Black Hawks	USHL	53	11	33	44	48	5	2	2	4	4
2013–14	Boston College	HE	35	5	8	13	48	—	—	—	—	—
2014–15	Boston College	HE	35	6	10	16	63	—	—	—	—	—
2015–16	Boston College	HE	40	6	15	21	86	—	—	—	—	—
2016–17	Springfield Thunderbirds	AHL	68	4	12	16	37	—	—	—	—	—
2016–17	Florida Panthers	NHL	3	0	1	1	0	—	—	—	—	—
2017–18	Florida Panthers	NHL	38	3	1	4	25	—	—	—	—	—
2017–18	Springfield Thunderbirds	AHL	2	0	1	1	2	—	—	—	—	—
2018–19	Springfield Thunderbirds	AHL	38	0	9	9	49	—	—	—	—	—
2018–19	Florida Panthers	NHL	19	1	1	2	8	—	—	—	—	—
2019–20	Springfield Thunderbirds	AHL	7	0	4	4	4	—	—	—	—	—
2019–20	Rockford IceHogs	AHL	56	2	6	8	74	—	—	—	—	—
2020–21	Iowa Wild	AHL	11	0	4	4	13	—	—	—	—	—
2021–22	Henderson Silver Knights	AHL	60	1	10	11	60	2	0	1	1	0
2022–23	Porin Ässät	Liiga	59	7	21	28	52	8	0	4	4	6
2023–24	Bílí Tygři Liberec	ELH	50	2	10	12	30	8	0	1	1	10
2024–25	Kunlun Red Star	KHL	61	4	11	15	49	—	—	—	—	—
2025–26	Barys Astana	KHL	66	3	5	8	44	—	—	—	—	—
NHL totals			60	4	3	7	33	—	—	—	—	—
KHL totals			127	7	16	23	93	—	—	—	—	—

Medal record

Ice hockey

Representing (United States) USA

World Junior A Challenge
Bronze medal – third place	2011 Langley	

=== International ===
Year	Team	Event	Result	GP	G	A	Pts	PIM
2014	United States	WJC	5th	5	0	0	0	4
2015	United States	WJC	5th	5	0	0	0	0
Junior totals				10	0	0	0	4

== Awards and honors ==
Award	Year
USHL
USHL/NHL Top Prospects Game	2012, 2013
USHL First All-Star Team.	2012–13
