= Anton Brehmer =

Swedish ice hockey player

- Born: February 6, 1994 (age 31) Örebro, Sweden
- Height: 5 ft 10 in (178 cm)
- Weight: 168 lb (76 kg; 12 st 0 lb)
- Position: Centre
- Shoots: Left
- SHL team Former teams: Örebro HK; Linköpings HC
- NHL draft: Undrafted
- Playing career: 2013–present

Anton Brehmer (born February 6, 1994) is a Swedish ice hockey player. He is currently playing with Örebro HK of the Swedish Hockey League (SHL).

Brehmer made his Elitserien debut playing with Linköpings HC during the 2012–13 Elitserien season.
