= Damir Musin =

Russian ice hockey player

- Born: October 5, 1994 (age 31) Kazan, Russia
- Height: 5 ft 11 in (180 cm)
- Weight: 185 lb (84 kg; 13 st 3 lb)
- Position: Defence
- Shoots: Left
- VHL team Former teams: Dizel Penza; Ak Bars Kazan; HC Sochi; Neftekhimik Nizhnekamsk; Spartak Moscow; HC Vityaz; Oulun Kärpät
- Playing career: 2014–present

Damir Musin (Tatar: Дамир Мусин, born October 5, 1994) is a Russian professional ice hockey defenceman. He is currently playing with Dizel Penza of the Supreme Hockey League (VHL).

== Playing career ==
Musin made his Kontinental Hockey League debut playing with Ak Bars Kazan during the 2014–15 KHL season.

In the 2018–19 season, Musin left Kazan to split the year between HC Sochi and HC Neftekhimik Nizhnekamsk. He contributed with 7 points through 55 games before he was returned in a trade to Ak Bars Kazan, in exchange for financial compensation on May 7, 2019.

After a brief stint with Oulun Kärpät of the Liiga to end the 2021–22 season, Musin returned to the KHL in the off-season, securing a one-year contract with Admiral Vladivostok on 3 June 2022.

== Awards and honours ==
Award	Year
KHL
Gagarin Cup (Ak Bars Kazan)	2018
