= Štěpán Jeník =

Czech ice hockey player

- Born: February 12, 1993 (age 33) Prague, Czech Republic
- Height: 6 ft 0 in (183 cm)
- Weight: 185 lb (84 kg; 13 st 3 lb)
- Position: Defence
- Shot: Left
- Played for: HC Slavia Praha
- Playing career: 2011–2018

Štěpán Jeník (born February 12, 1993, in Prague) is a Czech professional ice hockey player. He played four games for HC Slavia Praha in the Czech Extraliga during the 2010–11 Czech Extraliga season.
