= Mathias Israelsson =

Swedish ice hockey goaltender (born 1994)

- Born: July 19, 1994 (age 30); Kungälv, Sweden
- Height: 5 ft 10 in (178 cm)
- Weight: 190 lb (86 kg; 13 st 8 lb)
- Position: Goaltender
- Catches: Right
- WCHA team Former teams: Minnesota State; Frölunda HC
- NHL draft: Undrafted
- Playing career: 2013–present

Mathias Israelsson (born July 19, 1994) is a Swedish ice hockey goaltender who currently plays for Minnesota State in the Western Collegiate Hockey Association. He made his Elitserien debut playing with Frölunda HC during the 2012–13 Elitserien season.

== Playing career ==
After playing one game for Frölunda HC in the Swedish Hockey League, Israelsson was loaned to the Odense Bulldogs of the Metal Ligaen where he played in seven games.

Israelsson then moved to North America and began playing in the United States Hockey League with the Waterloo Black Hawks for the 2013-14 season. After playing in 10 games and posting a 6–3–0 record, Israelsson was traded to the Fargo Force in exchange for Cam Johnson. On June 11, 2015, Israelsson committed to play NCAA hockey for Northern Michigan University.

Israelsson began his freshman year at Northern Michigan University during the 2015–16 season. He played in four games and recorded a 2–2–0 record with a .922 save percentage. The following year, he played in six games and was named a WCHA Scholar-Athlete and to the All-Academic Team. In his junior year, Israelsson played in a career-high 11 games, posting a 2-5-2 record and was again named a WCHA Scholar-Athlete and to the All-Academic Team. Before his senior year began, Israelsson, tired of playing backup, transferred to Minnesota State.

== International play ==
Israelsson represented Sweden at the 2011 World Junior A Challenge. While playing in the preliminary round, he became the first goaltender to recorded a shutout against Canada West. Israelsson played in two games during the tournament and recorded a .943 save percentage to help Sweden place fourth.

== Awards and honors ==
Award	Year	Ref
College
WCHA Scholar-Athlete	2016, 2017	
All-Academic Team	2016, 2017	
