= Ilya Yamkin =

Russian ice hockey player

- Born: February 17, 1994 (age 31); Nizhny Novgorod, Russia
- Height: 5 ft 11 in (180 cm)
- Weight: 203 lb (92 kg; 14 st 7 lb)
- Position: Forward
- Shoots: Left
- KHL team: Torpedo Nizhny Novgorod
- NHL draft: Undrafted
- Playing career: 2013–present

Ilya Yamkin (born February 17, 1994) is a Russian professional ice hockey player. He is currently playing with Torpedo Nizhny Novgorod of the Kontinental Hockey League (KHL).

On September 12, 2013, Yamkin made his Kontinental Hockey League debut playing with Torpedo Nizhny Novgorod during the 2013–14 KHL season.
