= Tomáš Franek =

Czech ice hockey player

- Born: May 10, 1994 (age 30); Czech Republic
- Height: 5 ft 8 in (173 cm)
- Weight: 172 lb (78 kg; 12 st 4 lb)
- Position: Forward
- Shoots: Left
- Polska Hokej Liga team Former teams: KS Cracovia; HC Oceláři Třinec; Podhale Nowy Targ
- Playing career: 2013–present

Tomáš Franek (born May 10, 1994) is a Czech professional ice hockey forward for KS Cracovia of the Polska Hokej Liga.

Franek made his Czech Extraliga debut playing with HC Oceláři Třinec during the 2014-15 Czech Extraliga season.
