= 2012 IIHF World U18 Championships =

2012 IIHF U18 World Championship

Tournament details
- Host country: Czech Republic
- Venues: 3 (in 3 host cities)
- Dates: 12–22 April 2012
- Teams: 10

Final positions
- Champions: United States (7th title)
- Runners-up: Sweden
- Third place: Canada
- Fourth place: Finland

Tournament statistics
- Games played: 31
- Goals scored: 209 (6.74 per game)
- Attendance: 26,228 (846 per game)
- Scoring leader: (Canada) Matt Dumba (12 points)

The 2012 IIHF U18 World Championship was the 14th IIHF World U18 Championship and was hosted in Brno, Znojmo and Břeclav, Czech Republic. It began on 12 April 2012 with the gold medal game played on 22 April 2012.

Brno and Znojmo were originally to co-host, but a schedule change became necessary when Kometa Brno unexpectedly advanced to the Czech Extraliga finals, making their home ice unavailable to the tournament on three days.

The United States to win their seventh title, after defeated Sweden 7–0 in the final. Canada captured the bronze medal by beating Finland 5–4 in overtime.

== Top Division ==
All times are local. (Central European Summer Time – UTC+2)

=== Preliminary round ===
==== Group A ====
Pos	Team	Pld	W	OTW	OTL	L	GF	GA	GD	Pts	Qualification
1	United States	4	4	0	0	0	18	3	+15	12	Semifinals
2	Finland	4	3	0	0	1	15	9	+6	9	Quarterfinals
3	Canada	4	2	0	0	2	17	12	+5	6	Quarterfinals
4	Czech Republic	4	1	0	0	3	12	21	−9	3	Relegation round
5	Denmark	4	0	0	0	4	6	23	−17	0	Relegation round

Source: IIHF

12 April 2012; 16:00	Denmark	1–6 (1–3, 0–2, 0–1)	Canada	Kajot Arena, Brno; Attendance: 1,236

Game reference

Matthias Hansen
Goalies
Matt Murray
Referees:
(Hungary) Peter Gebei
(Czech Republic) Jan Hribik
Linesmen:
(United Kingdom) Scott Dalgleish
(Germany) Nikolaj Ponomarjow

	0–1	00:55 – S. Laughton (K. Rychel)
O. Björkstrand (Y. Vedel) (PP) – 11:57	1–1
	1–2	13:52 – G. Smith
	1–3	17:27 – M. Winther (B. Troock)
	1–4	33:22 – A. Mantha (T. Bourke, J. Morrissey) (PP)
	1–5	38:32– K. Rychel (M. Dumba, D. Severson) (PP)
	1–6	40:55 – M. Dumba (T. Bourke)

20 min
Penalties
16 min
16
Shots
48

12 April 2012; 20:00	Finland	0–4 (0–0, 0–0, 0–4)	United States	Kajot Arena, Brno; Attendance: 1,509

Game reference

Joonas Korpisalo
Goalies
Collin Olson
Referees:
(Slovakia) Daniel Konc
(Canada) Pascal St. Jacques
Linesmen:
(Russia) Roman Shikhanov
(Sweden) Emil Yletyinen

0–1	40:54 – N. Kerdiles (D. O'Regan, R. Hartman) (PP)
0–2	43:04 – M. Lane (J. Compher, F. Vatrano)
0–3	44:24 – Q. Shore (R. Barber, K. Osterberg)
0–4	48:35 – C. Carrick (M. Lane, F. Vatrano) (PP)

43 min
Penalties
14 min
21
Shots
37

13 April 2012; 15:00	Czech Republic	8–4 (1–1, 6–2, 1–1)	Denmark	Hostan Arena, Znojmo; Attendance: 1,694

Game reference

Marek Langhammer
Goalies
George Sorensen
Matthias Hansen
Referees:
(Finland) Anssi Salonen
(Belarus) Maxim Sidorenko
Linesmen:
(United Kingdom) Scott Dalgleish
(Switzerland) Andreas Kohler

D. Volek (V. Tomeček, A. Chlapík) (PP) – 05:37	1–0
	1–1	13:03 – O. Björkstrand (M. Eller, K. Lauridsen
E. Soumelidis (P. Šidlík, V. Tomeček) (PP) – 22:51	2–1
M. Procházka (M. Matějček) – 24:36	3–1
J. Štencel (M. Zadrazil) – 26:02	4–1
J. Vrána (E. Soumelidids, V. Tomeček) – 26:20	5–1
	5–2	28:05 – O. Björkstrand (K. Lauridsen)
	5–3	31:18 – K. Lauridsen (M. Brodersen, N. Gade)
D. Simon (E. Soumelidis, J. Vrána) – 31:46	6–3
O. Slováček (PP) – 35:29	7–3
	7–4	52:48 – M. Illemann (S. Mortensen)
J. Vrána (D. Simon) – 55:56	8–4

8 min
Penalties
14 min
47
Shots
28

14 April 2012; 13:00	United States	5–0 (1–0, 3–0, 1–0)	Czech Republic	Alcaplast Arena, Břeclav; Attendance: 1,857

Game reference

Colin Olson
Goalies
Marek Langhammer
Patrick Polivka
Referees:
(Russia) Roman Gofman
(Sweden) Mikael Sjoqvist
Linesmen:
(Germany) Nikolaj Ponomarjow
(Russia) Roman Shikhanov

N. Kerdiles (D. O'Regan) – 13:16	1–0
J. Trouba (S. Jones, N. Kerdiles) (PP) – 29:18	2–0
S. Jones (R. Hartman, J. Trouba) (PP) – 32:33	3–0
Q. Shore (R. Barber, A. Louis) – 38:31	4–0
R. Hartman (S. Jones) – 49:58	5–0

2 min
Penalties
31 min
37
Shots
17

14 April 2012; 18:00	Canada	2–4 (1–0, 1–3, 0–1)	Finland	Alcaplast Arena, Břeclav; Attendance: 825

Game reference

Matt Murray
Goalies
Joonas Korpisalo
Referees:
(Switzerland) Andreas Koch
(Germany) Florian Zehetleitner
Linesmen:
(Switzerland) Andreas Kohler
(Sweden) Emil Yletyinen

M. Dumba (H. Shinkaruk) – 19:59	1–0
	1–1	25:07 – A. Makinen (A. Mustonen, R. Ristolainen
K. Rychel (S. Laughton, M. Dumba) – 25:34	2–1
	2–2	32:48 – B. Pokka (T. Teräväinen, N. Tikkinen)
	2–3	39:04 – A. Lehkonen (N. Tikkinen, T. Teräväinen) (PP2)
	2–4	58:24 – R. Kulmala (S. Salminen, M. Vainonen)

28 min
Penalties
4 min
26
Shots
39

15 April 2012; 18:00	Denmark	0–4 (0–1, 0–2, 0–1)	United States	Kajot Arena, Brno; Attendance: 435

Game reference

George Sörensen
Goalies
Jared Rutledge
Referees:
(Slovenia) Igor Dremelj
(Switzerland) Andreas Koch
Linesmen:
(United Kingdom) Scott Dalgleish
(Sweden) Emil Yletyinen

0–1	01:53 – M. Lane (B. Skjei, J. Compher)
0–2	20:45 – S. Jones (N. Kerdiles, D. O'Regan) (PP)
0–3	26:07 – F. Vatrano (J. Compher, M. Lane)
0–4	54:28 – Q. Shore (C. Carrick)

8 min
Penalties
14 min
17
Shots
57

16 April 2012; 16:00	Canada	6–2 (4–1, 0–1, 2–0)	Czech Republic	Kajot Arena, Brno; Attendance: 2,093

Game reference

Matt Murray
Goalies
Patrik Polivka
Referees:
(United States) Harry Dumas
(Slovakia) Daniel Konc
Linesmen:
(United Kingdom) Scott Dalgleish
(Russia) Roman Shikhanov

B. Gaunce (G. Smith, S. Reinhart) – 09:26	1–0
	1–1	12:12– J. Houfek (P. Sedláček)
B. Gaunce (S. Reinhart, G. Smith) – 12:41	2–1
S. Laughton (K. Rychel, M. Dumba) – 13:26	3–1
S. Reinhart (K. Rychel) (PP) – 16:23	4–1
	4–2	25:46 – D. Volek (P. Machač, P. Šidlík)
M. Dumba (R. Pulock) (PP) – 44:47	5–2
K. Rychel (B. Gaunce) – 50:36	6–2

10 min
Penalties
10 min
41
Shots
25

16 April 2012; 20:00	Finland	5–1 (1–0, 2–1, 2–0)	Denmark	Kajot Arena, Brno; Attendance: 383

Game reference

Jean Auren
Goalies
George Sorensen
Referees:
(Russia) Roman Gofman
(Sweden) Mikael Sjöqvist
Linesmen:
(Switzerland) Andreas Kohler
(Germany) Nikolaj Ponomarjow

S. Markkula – 16:35	1–0
A. Lehkonen (T. Teräväinen, M. Lehtonen) – 23:13	2–0
A. Lehkonen (T. Teräväinen) (PP) – 24:44	3–0
	3–1	33:25 – M. Apserup (Y. Vedel)
R. Kulmala (V. Pokka) (PP) – 47:42	4–1
H. Ikonen (M. Vainonen) – 51:26	5–1

4 min
Penalties
6 min
42
Shots
19

17 April 2012; 16:00	Czech Republic	2–6 (0–2, 1–1, 1–3)	Finland	Kajot Arena, Brno; Attendance: 1,450

Game reference

Patrik Polivka
Goalies
Joonas Korpisalo
Referees:
(Switzerland) Andreas Koch
(Belarus) Maxim Sidorenko
Linesmen:
(Switzerland) Andreas Kohler
(Germany) Nikolaj Ponomarjow

	0–1	05:54 – M. Vainonen (H. Haapala, A. Mustonen)
	0–2	10:25 – R. Kulmala (H. Haapala, A. Mustonen)
	0–3	25:31 – A. Mustonen (H. Haapala)
D. Simon (J. Vrána) – 28:35	1–3
	1–4	40:52 – R. Kulmala (E. Lindell, V. Pokka)
J. Hudeček (D. Volek) – 48:29	2–4
	2–5	55:39 – S. Markkula (A. Barkov)
	2–6	56:23 – A. Barkov (V. Pokka, S. Markkula) (PP)

22 min
Penalties
6 min
28
Shots
46

17 April 2012; 20:00	United States	5–3 (0–0, 2–2, 3–1)	Canada	Kajot Arena, Brno; Attendance: 1,920

Game reference

Collin Olson
Goalies
Matt Murray
Referees:
(Czech Republic) Jan Hribik
(Sweden) Mikael Sjöqvist
Linesmen:
(Russia) Roman Shikhanov
(Sweden) Emil Yletyinen

	0–1	22:45 – H. Shinkaruk (T. Bourke, M. Dumba) (PP)
M. Grzelcyk (C. Carrick, Q. Shore) (PP) – 24:50	1–1
	1–2	30:00 – M. Dumba (J. Morrissey, H. Shinkaruk) (PP)
R. Barber (Q. Shore) (PP) – 38:50	2–2
S. Jones (R. Hartman) (PP) – 45:10	3–2
F. Vatrano (M. Lane) – 46:39	4–2
	4–3	55:06 – R. Pulock (T. Bourke, S. Laughton)
M. Lane (EA) – 59:27	5–3

12 min
Penalties
22 min
40
Shots
29

==== Group B ====
Pos	Team	Pld	W	OTW	OTL	L	GF	GA	GD	Pts	Qualification
1	Sweden	4	4	0	0	0	20	4	+16	12	Semifinals
2	Russia	4	2	0	0	2	14	7	+7	6	Quarterfinals
3	Germany	4	2	0	0	2	15	17	−2	6	Quarterfinals
4	Latvia	4	2	0	0	2	11	15	−4	6	Relegation round
5	Switzerland	4	0	0	0	4	6	23	−17	0	Relegation round

Source: IIHF

12 April 2012; 16:00	Latvia	1–6 (0–2, 0–2, 1–2)	Russia	Hostan Arena, Znojmo; Attendance: 652

Game reference

Elvis Merzļikins
Goalies
Andrei Vasilevskiy
Referees:
(Switzerland) Andreas Koch
(Germany) Florian Zehetleitner
Linesmen:
(Czech Republic) Vit Lederer
(Finland) Kristian Vikman

	0–1	07:33 – B. Yakimov (K. Maslov)
	0–2	16:30 – A. Khatsei (A. Filippov, Y. Malenkikh)
	0–3	21:12 – D. Zharkov (V. Osnovin) (PP)
	0–4	25:21 – N. Zadorov (D. Zharkov) (SH)
	0–5	41:50 – V. Osnovin (D. Zharkov)
	0–6	47:44 – A. Slepyshev (B. Yakimov, A. Bereglazov) (PP)
G. Golovkovs (E. Kulda) – 52:08	1–6

24 min
Penalties
14 min
18
Shots
40

12 April 2012; 20:00	Germany	1–8 (1–1, 0–2, 0–5)	Sweden	Hostan Arena, Znojmo; Attendance: 723

Game reference

Patrick Klein
Goalies
Oscar Dansk
Referees:
(Slovenia) Igor Dremelj
(Finland) Anssi Salonen
Linesmen:
(Canada) Justin Hull
(Czech Republic) Tomáš Pešek

D. Shevyrin (T. Bender, J. Moser) – 05:48	1–0
	1–1	14:59 – M. Kalin (J. Pettersson, C. Djoos) (PP)
	1–2	21:18 – A. Wennberg (S. Collberg)
	1–3	29:37 – M. Kalin (T. Törnkvist)
	1–4	40:35 – A. Wennberg (S. Collberg, C. Andersson) (PP)
	1–5	50:03 – S. Collberg (A. Wennberg, C. Andersson) (PP)
	1–6	53:07 – A. Wennberg (S. Collberg, L. Byström)
	1–7	57:49 – F. Forsberg (A. Burakovsky, H. Lindholm) (PP)
	1–8	58:55 – C. Djoos (G. Possler, F. Sandberg)

18 min
Penalties
8 min
30
Shots
42

13 April 2012; 19:00	Switzerland	2–4 (1–2, 1–2, 0–0)	Latvia	Hostan Arena, Znojmo; Attendance: 147

Game reference

Melvin Nyffleler
Goalies
Elvis Merzļikins
Referees:
(Russia) Roman Gofman
(Sweden) Mikael Sjöqvist
Linesmen:
(United States) Tommy George
(Czech Republic) Tomáš Pešek

	0–1	01:56 – Ņ. Jevpalovs (M. Lavrovs)
J. Schmutz – 06:22	1–1
	1–2	11:49 – M. Lavrovs
	1–3	28:43 – E. Kulda (E. Augstkalns) (PP)
L. Balmelli (D. Simion) (PP) – 34:31	2–3
	2–4	39:18 – G. Golovkovs (K. Ozoliņš)

12 min
Penalties
8 min
44
Shots
22

14 April 2012; 14:00	Russia	2–4 (1–2, 1–1, 0–1)	Germany	Hostan Arena, Znojmo; Attendance: 231

Game reference

Andrei Vasilevskiy
Goalies
Marvin Cupper
Referees:
(United States) Harry Dumas
(Czech Republic) Jan Hribik
Linesmen:
(United States) Tommy George
(Canada) Justin Hull

V. Nichushkin (B. Yakimov, A. Slepyshev) – 09:13	1–0
	1–1	17:45 – F. Tiffels (L. Palausch)
	1–2	19:48 – M. Kurth (L. Draisaitl) (PP)
	1–3	28:31 – M. Kurth (L. Draisaitl) (PP)
B. Yakimov (A. Bereglazov, D. Kamayev) – 33:15	2–3
	2–4	54:03 – T. Bender (L. Palausch) (PP)

10 min
Penalties
4 min
42
Shots
29

14 April 2012; 18:00	Sweden	7–2 (3–0, 1–1, 3–1)	Switzerland	Hostan Arena, Znojmo; Attendance: 353

Game reference

Oscar Dansk
Goalies
Niklas Schlegel
Referees:
(Slovakia) Daniel Konc
(Belarus) Maxim Sidorenko
Linesmen:
(Czech Republic) Vit Lederer
(Finland) Kristian Vikman

G. Possler (S. Collberg) – 06:42	1–0
M. Kalin (F. Sandberg, E. Karlsson) – 08:17	2–0
F. Forsberg (J. de la Rose, A. Burakovsky) – 14:35	3–0
G. Possler (A. Wennberg) – 21:26	4–0
	4–1	34:31 – F. Herzog (T. Studer)
S. Collberg (A. Wennberg) – 44:19	5–1
F. Sandberg (H. Lindholm, L. Byström) (PP) – 46:04	6–1
	6–2	50:33 – M. Müller (X. Busser) (EA)
G. Possler (M. Nilsson) – 59:40	7–2

8 min
Penalties
8 min
39
Shots
20

15 April 2012; 18:00	Latvia	1–3 (0–0, 0–1, 1–2)	Sweden	Hostan Arena, Znojmo; Attendance: 395

Game reference

Ivars Punnenovs
Goalies
Marcus Hogberg
Referees:
(Hungary) Peter Gebei
(Czech Republic) Jan Hribik
Linesmen:
(Canada) Justin Hull
(Czech Republic) Tomáš Pešek

	0–1	25:46 – M. Kalin (C. Andersson, F. Sandberg)
R. Kondrāts – 42:53	1–1
	1–2	44:34 – F. Forsberg (J. de la Rose) (PP)
	1–3	59:25 – E. Lindholm (H. Lindholm) (ENG)

29 min
Penalties
8 min
21
Shots
41

16 April 2012; 16:00	Germany	4–5 (1–1, 2–2, 1–2)	Latvia	Hostan Arena, Znojmo; Attendance: 230

Game reference

Marvin Cupper
Goalies
Elvis Merzļikins
Ivars Punnenovs
Referees:
(Slovenia) Igor Dremelj
(Canada) Pascal St. Jacques
Linesmen:
(United States) Tommy George
(Finland) Kristian Vikman

D. Kahun (L. Draisaitl, E. Stephan) – 04:35	1–0
	1–1	08:23 – T. Bļugers (R. Bukarts, M. Lavrovs) (PP)
S. Ziegler (D. Tiffels) – 25:00	2–1
	2–2	31:36 – R. Lipsbergs (Ņ. Jevpalovs)
	2–3	38:36 – R. Lipsbergs (A. Ševčenko, R. Kondrāts)
J. Moser (L. Draisaitl, T. Bender) – 39:34	3–3
	3–4	40:48 – G. Golovkovs (P. Škuratovs)
M. Kurth (E. Stephan) – 49:42	4–4
	4–5	51:56 – R. Lipsbergs (A. Ševčenko, R. Kondrāts)

6 min
Penalties
6 min
39
Shots
33

16 April 2012; 20:00	Russia	6–0 (1–0, 2–0, 3–0)	Switzerland	Hostan Arena, Znojmo; Attendance: 752

Game reference

Andrei Vasilevskiy
Goalies
Melvin Nyffeler
Referees:
(Hungary) Peter Gebei
(Finland) Anssi Salonen
Linesmen:
(Czech Republic) Vit Lederer
(Czech Republic) Tomáš Pešek

N. Zadorov (V. Osnovin) – 03:37	1–0
A. Slepyshev (B. Yakimov) – 20:13	2–0
B. Yakimov (A. Slepyshev, A. Barabanov) – 38:28	3–0
A. Delinov (D. Kamayev, D. Zharkov) – 48:07	4–0
D. Zharkov (D. Kamayev, A. Delinov) – 51:20	5–0
A. Barabanov (A. Bereglazov, A. Slepyshev) (PP) – 53:29	6–0

12 min
Penalties
10 min
40
Shots
24

17 April 2012; 16:00	Sweden	2–0 (2–0, 0–0, 0–0)	Russia	Hostan Arena, Znojmo; Attendance: 1,485

Game reference
Oscar Dansk	Goalies	Andrei Vasilevskiy	Referees: (Canada) Pascal St. Jacques (Germany) Florian Zehetleitner; Linesmen: (United States) Tommy George (Canada) Justin Hull
F. Forsberg (E. Lindholm, A. Burakovsky) – 06:05 / 1–0; F. Forsberg (O. Dansk) (PP) – 08:52 / 2–0			Referees: (Canada) Pascal St. Jacques (Germany) Florian Zehetleitner; Linesmen: (United States) Tommy George (Canada) Justin Hull
20 min	Penalties	47 min	Referees: (Canada) Pascal St. Jacques (Germany) Florian Zehetleitner; Linesmen: (United States) Tommy George (Canada) Justin Hull
42	Shots	28	Referees: (Canada) Pascal St. Jacques (Germany) Florian Zehetleitner; Linesmen: (United States) Tommy George (Canada) Justin Hull

17 April 2012; 20:00	Switzerland	2–6 (0–4, 0–1, 2–1)	Germany	Hostan Arena, Znojmo; Attendance: 342

Game reference

Melvin Nyffeler
Niklas Schlegel
Goalies
Patrick Klein
Referees:
(United States) Harry Dumas
(Russia) Roman Gofman
Linesmen:
(Czech Republic) Vit Lederer
(Finland) Kristian Vikman

	0–1	10:52 – M. Eisenschmid (D. Kahun)
	0–2	14:11 – L. Draisaitl (M. Eisenschmid)
	0–3	17:56 – L. Draisaitl (D. Kahun) (PP)
	0–4	18:37 – B. Zientek (E. Stephan)
	0–5	38:23 – S. Ziegler (L. Draisaitl)
	0–6	50:29 – T. Bender (M. Kurth, L. Palausch) (PP)
F. Herzog (L. Balmelli, T. Studer) – 53:22	1–6
D. Simion (A. Lanzarotti, X. Busser) (PP) – 59:16	2–6

16 min
Penalties
14 min
39
Shots
30

=== Relegation round ===
Pos	Team	Pld	W	OTW	OTL	L	GF	GA	GD	Pts	Relegation
1	Switzerland	3	2	0	0	1	8	7	+1	6	
2	Czech Republic	3	2	0	0	1	17	12	+5	6	
3	Latvia	3	1	0	1	1	11	13	−2	4	
4	Denmark	3	0	1	0	2	9	13	−4	2	Relegated to the 2013 Division I A

Source: IIHF

19 April 2012; 15:00	Czech Republic	2–4 (0–1, 1–1, 1–2)	Switzerland	Hostan Arena, Znojmo; Attendance: 473

Game reference

Patrik Polivka
Goalies
Melvin Nyffeler
Referees:
(Hungary) Peter Gebei
(Sweden) Mikael Sjöqvist
Linesmen:
(Canada) Justin Hull
(Sweden) Emil Yletyinen

	0–1	11:05 – F. Schmutz (X. Busser, A. Rouiller) (PP)
	0–2	21:31 – S. Zangger (N. Brandi)
O. Slováček – 26:46	1–2
	1–3	40:41 – N. Brandi (PP)
	1–4	51:42 – F. Schmutz (P. Baltisberger) (SH)
J. Hudeček (P. Šidlík) (PP) – 59:33	2–4

14 min
Penalties
16 min
27
Shots
36

19 April 2012; 19:00	Latvia	3–4 OT (0–1, 2–0, 1–2) (OT: 0–1)	Denmark	Hostan Arena, Znojmo; Attendance: 202

Game reference

Ivars Punnenovs
Goalies
George Sørensen
Referees:
(Slovenia) Igor Dremelj
(Slovakia) Daniel Konc
Linesmen:
(United Kingdom) Scott Dalgleish
(Finland) Kristian Vikman

	0–1	17:47 – B. Uldall (K. Lauridsen) (PP)
T. Bļugers (M. Gelazis, M. Freimanis) (PP) – 21:55	1–1
E. Kulda (E. Augstkalns, G. Golovkovs) (PP) – 34:30	2–1
E. Augstkalns (T. Bļugers, R. Bukarts) (PP) – 44:15	3–1
	3–2	44:24 – K. Lauridsen (M. Eller, O. Bjorkstrand)
	3–3	59:36 – K. Lauridsen (M. Eller, O. Bjorkstrand) (EA)
	3–4	64:04 – K. Lauridsen (O. Bjorkstrand)

14 min
Penalties
10 min
28
Shots
28

20 April 2012; 15:00	Czech Republic	7–4 (2–1, 4–1, 1–2)	Latvia	Hostan Arena, Znojmo; Attendance: 847

Game reference

Patrik Polivka
Goalies
Elvis Merzlikiņš
Referees:
(Switzerland) Andreas Koch
(Finland) Anssi Salonen
Linesmen:
(Germany) Nikolaj Ponomarjow
(Finland) Kristian Vikman

M. Zadrazil (D. Simon, P. Šidlík) (SH) – 09:11	1–0
	1–1	09:55 – R. Kalvītis (Ņ. Jevpalovs, T. Bļugers) (PP)
M. Procházka (D. Volek) – 10:23	2–1
J. Vrána (D. Simon, E. Soumelidis) – 22:35	3–1
V. Tomeček (J. Košťálek, P. Machač) – 24:22	4–1
	4–2	25:42 – N. Jeļisejevs (R. Bukarts)
J. Vrána (D. Simon, L. Šulák) – 31:03	5–2
D. Simon (J. Vrána, L. Sulak) – 32:59	6–2
	6–3	42:04 – R. Lipsbergs (R. Kalvītis, R. Bukarts) (PP2)
	6–4	47:15 – E. Kulda (A. Ševčenko, G. Golovkovs)
D. Simon (J. Vrána, L. Sulak) (PP) – 58:52	7–4

10 min
Penalties
20 min
35
Shots
29

20 April 2012; 19:00	Switzerland	2–1 (1–0, 1–0, 0–1)	Denmark	Hostan Arena, Znojmo; Attendance: 351

Game reference

Melvin Nyffeler
Goalies
George Sørensen
Referees:
(Belarus) Maxim Sidorenko
(Germany) Florian Zehetleitner
Linesmen:
(United States) Tommy George
(Czech Republic) Tomas Pesek

D. Kummer (R. Diem, T. Studer) – 12:43	1–0
X. Busser (A. Rouiller, S. Zangger) (PP) – 23:45	2–0
	2–1	59:23 – O. Bjorkstrand (K. Lauridsen)

131 min
Penalties
141 min
37
Shots
23

=== Final round ===
Quarterfinals
A2	Finland	8
B3	Germany	0
B2	Russia	2
A3	Canada	4

Semifinals
B1	Sweden	7
A2	Finland	3
A1	United States	2
A3	Canada	1

Final
B1	Sweden	0
A1	United States	7
Third place
A2	Finland	4
A3	Canada	5

==== Quarterfinals ====
19 April 2012; 15:00	Finland	8–0 (2–0, 4–0, 2–0)	Germany	Alcaplast Arena, Břeclav; Attendance: 353

Game reference

Joonas Korpisalo
Goalies
Patrick Klein
Marvin Cupper
Referees:
(Russia) Roman Gofman
(Belarus) Maxim Sidorenko
Linesmen:
(Czech Republic) Vit Lederer
(Russia) Roman Shikhanov

A. Mustonen (H. Haapala) – 03:26	1–0
T. Teräväinen (J. Ikonen, A. Lehkonen) – 10:28	2–0
H. Ikonen (M. Vainonen, A. Barkov) – 24:58	3–0
H. Haapala (R. Kulmala, E. Lindell) (PP) – 30:43	4–0
J. Antonen (S. Salminen) – 34:53	5–0
A. Lehkonen (T. Teräväinen, V. Pokka) – 39:18	6–0
T. Teräväinen (A. Lehkonen) – 40:24	7–0
H. Haapala (R. Kulmala, E. Lindell) – 55:04	8–0

2 min
Penalties
6 min
36
Shots
18

19 April 2012; 19:00	Russia	2–4 (0–2, 1–1, 1–1)	Canada	Alcaplast Arena, Břeclav; Attendance: 525

Game reference

Andrei Vasilevski
Goalies
Matt Murray
Referees:
(United States) Harry Dumas
(Czech Republic) Jan Hribík
Linesmen:
(United States) Tommy George
(Switzerland) Andreas Kohler

	0–1	09:05 – M. Dumba (S. Reinhart, S. Laughton)
	0–2	17:07 – K. Rychel (T. Bourke, H. Shinkaruk)
A. Filippov (A. Bereglazov) – 23:36	1–2
	1–3	37:03 – K. Rychel (T. Bourke, H. Shinkaruk)
	1–4	51:50 – F. Girard (M. Winther, G. Smith)
A. Slepyshev (A. Bereglazov, B. Yakimov) – 55:54	2–4

6 min
Penalties
18 min
30
Shots
28

==== Semifinals ====
20 April 2012; 15:00	Sweden	7–3 (1–1, 2–2, 4–0)	Finland	Kajot Arena, Brno; Attendance: 520

Game reference

Oscar Dansk
Goalies
Joonas Korpisalo
Jean Auren
Referees:
(Slovakia) Daniel Konc
(Canada) Pascal St. Jacques
Linesmen:
(Canada) Justin Hull
(Russia) Roman Shikhanov

	0–1	03:18 – A. Lehkonen (T. Teräväinen) (PP)
J. de la Rose (G. Possler, A. Wennberg) – 16:41	1–1
G. Possler (F. Forsberg) – 21:12	2–1
E. Karlsson (J. de la Rose) – 26:52	3–1
	3–2	29:50 – A. Lehkonen (R. Kulmala)
	3–3	31:50 – R. Ristolainen (E. Lindell, H. Haapala) (PP)
J. Pettersson (T. Törnkvist) – 45:46	4–3
F. Forsberg (S. Collberg, A. Wennberg) (PP2) – 52:33	5–3
S. Collberg (A. Wennberg, G. Possler) – 57:18	6–3
S. Collberg (G. Possler) (PP) – 59:13	7–3

18 min
Penalties
14 min
41
Shots
44

20 April 2012; 19:00	United States	2–1 (1–1, 0–0, 1–0)	Canada	Kajot Arena, Brno; Attendance: 640

Game reference

Collin Olson
Goalies
Matt Murray
Referees:
(Russia) Roman Gofman
(Sweden) Mikael Sjöqvist
Linesmen:
(Switzerland) Andreas Kohler
(Czech Republic) Vit Lederer

J. Compher (M. Lane, S. Jones) – 10:36	1–0
	1–1	15:23 – G. Smith (D. Severson)
K. Osterberg (S. Jones) – 46:26	2–1

6 min
Penalties
10 min
27
Shots
22

==== Fifth place game ====
21 April 2012; 14:00	Russia	4–1 (0–1, 2–0, 2–0)	Germany	Kajot Arena, Brno; Attendance: 310

Game reference

Ivan Nalimov
Goalies
Marvin Cupper
Referees:
(Slovakia) Daniel Konc
(Sweden) Mikael Sjöqvist
Linesmen:
(United Kingdom) Scott Dalgleish
(Sweden) Emil Yletyinen

	0–1	15:49 – F. Tiffels (SH)
A. Khatsei (S. Kuptsov) – 24:15	1–1
A. Khatsei – 36:20	2–1
V. Nichushkin (A. Filippov, A. Delnov) – 47:50	3–1
A. Mironov (A. Bereglazov, A. Slepyshev) – 48:03	4–1

8 min
Penalties
33 min
36
Shots
23

==== Bronze medal game ====
22 April 2012; 12:00	Finland	4–5 OT (0–2, 3–2, 1–0) (OT: 0–1)	Canada	Kajot Arena, Brno; Attendance: 1,150

Game reference

Joonas Korpisalo
Goalies
Matt Murray
Referees:
(United States) Harry Dumas
(Czech Republic) Jan Hribík
Linesmen:
(United States) Tommy George
(Switzerland) Andreas Kohler

	0–1	10:30 – H. Shinkaruk (M. Dumba) (PP)
	0–2	15:21 – S. Reinhart (J. Morrissey, M. Dumba) (PP)
H. Haapala (E. Lindell, V. Pokka) – 20:47	1–2
	1–3	24:00 – H. Shinkaruk (T. Bourke)
	1–4	30:34 – B. Gaunce (S. Laughton) (SH)
A. Lehkonen (H. Haapala, R. Ristolainen) (PP) – 31:23	2–4
H. Haapala (A. Lehkonen) (PP) – 39:15	3–4
R. Ristolainen (H. Haapala, R. Kulmala) (PP) – 49:30	4–4
	4–5	62:05 – H. Shinkaruk (S. Laughton, M. Dumba)

4 min
Penalties
33 min
33
Shots
38

==== Final ====
22 April 2012; 16:00	Sweden	0–7 (0–1, 0–3, 0–3)	United States	Kajot Arena, Brno; Attendance: 2,145

Game reference

Oscar Dansk
Marcus Hogberg
Goalies
Collin Olson
Referees:
(Russia) Roman Gofman
(Canada) Pascal St. Jacques
Linesmen:
(Canada) Justin Hull
(Czech Republic) Vit Lederer

0–1	18:45 – T. Dipauli (A. Copp, R. Hartman)
0–2	28:26 – D. O'Regan
0–3	32:47 – J. Compher (N. Kerdiles, S. Jones)
0–4	37:48 – N. Kerdiles
0–5	40:18 – R. Hartman (N. Kerdiles, D. O'Regan)
0–6	47:53 – C. Carrick (N. Kerdiles)
0–7	59:44 – N. Kerdiles (K. Osterberg)

2 min
Penalties
8 min
27
Shots
45

=== Final standings ===
	Team
1st place, gold medalist(s)	United States
2nd place, silver medalist(s)	Sweden
3rd place, bronze medalist(s)	Canada
4th	Finland
5th	Russia
6th	Germany
7th	Switzerland
8th	Czech Republic
9th	Latvia
10th	Denmark

2012 IIHF U18 World champions

United States
7th title

=== Scoring leaders ===
List shows the top ten skaters sorted by points, then goals.

Player	GP	G	A	Pts	+/−	PIM
(Canada) Mathew Dumba	7	5	7	12	+2	20
(Finland) Artturi Lehkonen	7	7	3	10	+3	6
(Finland) Henrik Haapala	7	4	6	10	+4	2
(Finland) Rasmus Kulmala	7	5	4	9	+4	2
(Sweden) Sebastian Collberg	6	4	5	9	+1	14
(United States) Nicolas Kerdiles	6	4	5	9	+8	2
(Sweden) Alexander Wennberg	6	3	6	9	+2	0
(Canada) Kerby Rychel	7	5	3	8	+4	12
(Denmark) Kristoffer Lauridsen	5	4	4	8	+4	4
(Sweden) Gustav Possler	6	4	4	8	+5	0
(Canada) Hunter Shinkaruk	6	4	4	8	+3	6
(Czech Republic) Dominik Simon	6	4	4	8	+2	4

GP = Games played; G = Goals; A = Assists; Pts = Points; +/− = Plus/minus; PIM = Penalties In Minutes
Source: IIHF.com

=== Leading goaltenders ===
Only the top five goaltenders, based on save percentage, who have played 40% of their team's minutes are included in this list.

Player	TOI	SA	GA	GAA	Sv%	SO
(United States) Collin Olson	300:00	116	4	0.80	96.55	3
(Sweden) Oscar Dansk	272:47	143	9	1.98	93.71	1
(Russia) Andrei Vasilevski	299:20	141	11	2.20	92.20	1
(Canada) Matt Murray	419:51	210	19	2.72	90.95	0
(Denmark) George Sørensen	276:12	193	18	3.91	90.67	0

TOI = Time on ice (minutes:seconds); SA = Shots against; GA = Goals against; GAA = Goals against average; Sv% = Save percentage; SO = Shutouts
Source: IIHF.com

=== Tournament Awards ===
Best players selected by the directorate:

- Best Goalkeeper: Collin Olson (USA)
- Best Defenseman: Mathew Dumba (CAN)
- Best Forward: Filip Forsberg (SWE)

Best players of each team
Best players of each team selected by the coaches.

Team	Players
Canada	Mathew Dumba; Matt Murray; Adam Pelech
Czech Republic	Petr Šidlík; Jakub Vrána; Dominik Simon
Denmark	Oliver Bjorkstrand; Kristoffer Lauridsen; Bjørn Uldall
Finland	Henrik Happala; Rasmus Kulmala; Artturi Lehkonen
Germany	Marcel Kurth; Lennart Palausch; Sven Ziegler
Latvia	Georgs Golovkovs; Teodors Bļugers; Rūdolfs Kalvītis
Russia	Anton Slepyshev; Alexander Barabanov; Bogdan Yakimov
Switzerland	Lucas Balmelli; Samuel Kreis; Nico Dunner
Sweden	Oscar Dansk; Hampus Lindholm; Sebastian Collberg
United States	Seth Jones; Matt Lane; Collin Olson

== Division I ==
=== Group A ===
The tournament was played in Piešťany, Slovakia, from 11 to 17 April 2012.

Pos	Team	Pld	W	OTW	OTL	L	GF	GA	GD	Pts	Promotion or relegation
1	Slovakia	5	5	0	0	0	30	6	+24	15	Promoted to the 2013 Top Division
2	Norway	5	3	0	0	2	22	20	+2	9	
3	Italy	5	1	1	2	1	17	20	−3	7	
4	France	5	1	1	0	3	12	19	−7	5	
5	Slovenia	5	1	1	0	3	12	21	−9	5	
6	Japan	5	1	0	1	3	14	21	−7	4	Relegated to the 2013 Division I B

Source: IIHF

=== Group B ===
The tournament was played in Székesfehérvár, Hungary, from 11 to 17 April 2012.

Pos	Team	Pld	W	OTW	OTL	L	GF	GA	GD	Pts	Promotion or relegation
1	Belarus	5	5	0	0	0	28	9	+19	15	Promoted to the 2013 Division I A
2	Kazakhstan	5	3	1	0	1	27	16	+11	11	
3	Austria	5	2	1	0	2	21	21	0	8	
4	Ukraine	5	1	1	1	2	20	26	−6	6	
5	Poland	5	0	1	1	3	13	30	−17	3	
6	Hungary	5	0	0	2	3	13	20	−7	2	Relegated to the 2013 Division II A

Source: IIHF

== Division II ==
=== Group A ===
The tournament was played in Heerenveen, the Netherlands, from 31 March to 6 April 2012.

Pos	Team	Pld	W	OTW	OTL	L	GF	GA	GD	Pts	Promotion or relegation
1	South Korea	5	3	1	1	0	17	14	+3	12	Promoted to the 2013 Division I B
2	Romania	5	4	0	0	1	25	15	+10	12	
3	Lithuania	5	3	1	0	1	22	11	+11	11	
4	Great Britain	5	1	1	0	3	18	17	+1	5	
5	Croatia	5	1	0	1	3	8	23	−15	4	
6	Netherlands	5	0	0	1	4	16	26	−10	1	Relegated to the 2013 Division II B

Source: IIHF

=== Group B ===
The tournament was played in Novi Sad, Serbia, from 20 to 26 March 2012.

Pos	Team	Pld	W	OTW	OTL	L	GF	GA	GD	Pts	Promotion or relegation
1	Estonia	5	4	1	0	0	32	17	+15	14	Promoted to the 2013 Division II A
2	Serbia	5	3	0	0	2	22	16	+6	9	
3	Spain	5	2	1	0	2	21	18	+3	8	
4	Iceland	5	2	0	1	2	23	23	0	7	
5	Australia	5	1	0	1	3	8	20	−12	4	
6	China	5	0	1	1	3	18	30	−12	3	Relegated to the 2013 Division III A

Source: IIHF

== Division III ==
The tournament was played in Sofia, Bulgaria, from 12 to 18 March 2012.

Pos	Team	Pld	W	OTW	OTL	L	GF	GA	GD	Pts	Promotion or relegation
1	Belgium	5	5	0	0	0	48	12	+36	15	Promoted to the 2013 Division II B
2	New Zealand	5	4	0	0	1	33	13	+20	12	
3	Mexico	5	3	0	0	2	24	15	+9	9	
4	Bulgaria	5	2	0	0	3	27	23	+4	6	
5	Chinese Taipei	5	1	0	0	4	19	26	−7	3	
6	South Africa	5	0	0	0	5	6	68	−62	0	Relegated to the 2013 Division III B

Source: IIHF
