= Alexei Filippov =

Alexei Filippov may refer to:

- Alexei Filippov (ice hockey, born 1989), Russian professional ice hockey player
- Alexei Filippov (ice hockey, born 1994), Russian professional ice hockey player
