= Zadražil =

Zadražil (feminine: Zadražilová) is a Czech surname. Notable people with the surname include:

- Adam Zadražil (born 2000), Czech footballer
- Matěj Zadražil (born 1994), Czech ice hockey player
- Sarah Zadrazil (born 1993), Austrian footballer
