= Kulmala =

Kulmala is a Finnish surname. Notable people with the surname include:

- Ifeoma Kulmala (born 1988), Finnish football referee
- Rasmus Kulmala (born 1994), Finnish ice hockey player
- Rudy Frans Kulmala (born 1983), Finnish rapper known by his stage name Ruudolf
