= Bogdan Yakimov =

Russian ice hockey player

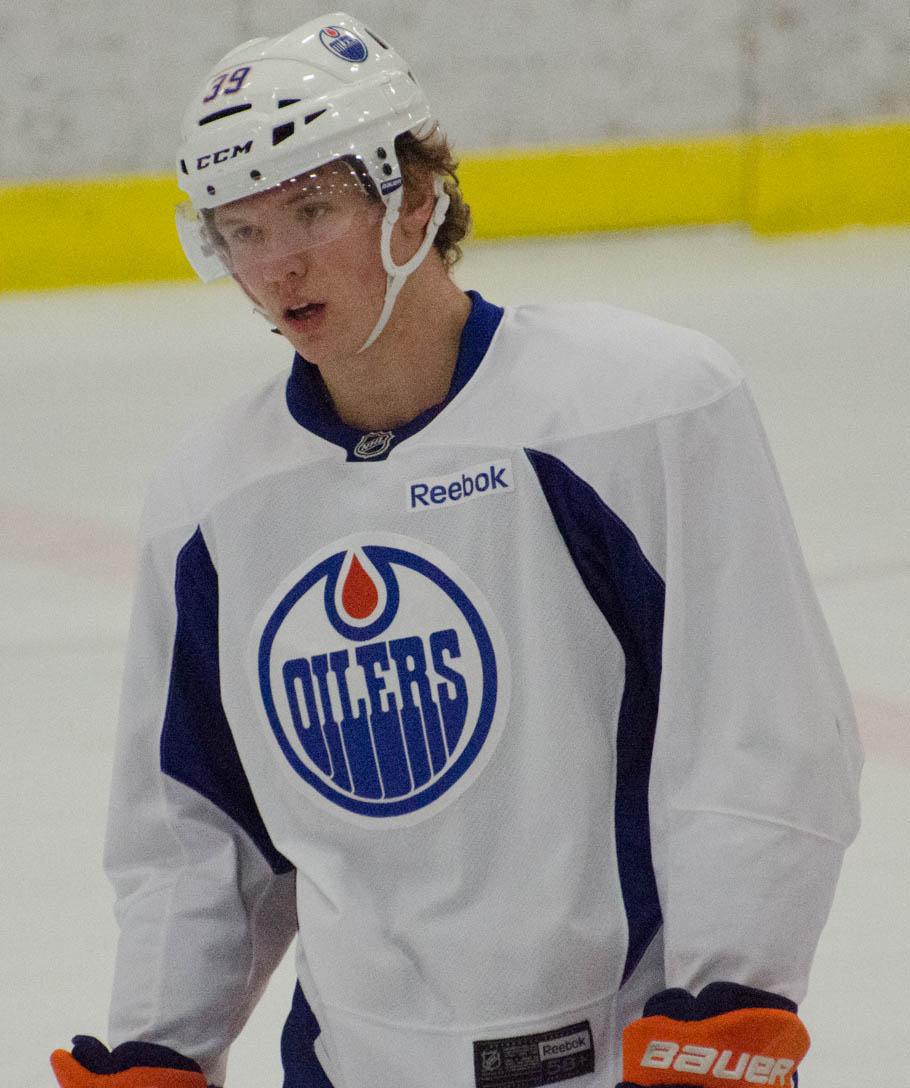
- Yakimov with the Edmonton Oilers in 2014
- Born: 4 October 1994 (age 31) Nizhnekamsk, Russia
- Height: 6 ft 5 in (196 cm)
- Weight: 232 lb (105 kg; 16 st 8 lb)
- Position: Centre
- Shot: Left
- Played for: Neftekhimik Nizhnekamsk; Edmonton Oilers; Avangard Omsk; Severstal Cherepovets; SKA Saint Petersburg; HC Sochi; Dynamo Moscow
- NHL draft: 83rd overall, 2013; Edmonton Oilers
- Playing career: 2012–2022

Bogdan Petrovich Yakimov (born 4 October 1994) is a Russian former professional ice hockey centre who played in the Kontinental Hockey League (KHL) and briefly in the National Hockey League (NHL) with the Edmonton Oilers. Yakimov was selected 32nd overall by HC Neftekhimik Nizhnekamsk in the 2011 KHL Junior Draft and was also selected by the Oilers in the 3rd round (83rd overall) of the 2013 NHL entry draft.

== Playing career ==
Leading up to the 2013 NHL Entry Draft, Yakimov was lauded as a top prospect who was Ranked 11th in the NHL Central Scouting Bureau's Final 2013 International Skater Rankings. whilst playing with Reaktor of the MHL, a junior affiliate, of HC Nizhnekamsk Neftekhimik.

After his first season in the Kontinental Hockey League with Neftekhimik, Yakimov was signed to a three-year entry-level contract with the Edmonton Oilers on 5 August 2014.

On 28 July 2016, Yakimov was loaned by the Oilers to return for a third stint with HC Neftekhimik Nizhnekamsk of the KHL for the 2016–17 season.

Continuing his loan into the 2017–18 season. He notched a career-high 8 goals and matched his previous season's 11 points in 56 games.

Unsigned from the Oilers, but his rights retained by the club, Yakimov opted to continue in the KHL with Nizhnekamsk. During the 2018–19 season, while stagnating with Nizhnekamsk in registering just 3 points in 27 games, Yakimov was traded to Avangard Omsk on 26 November 2018. His stay with Avangard was brief, after going scoreless in 5 games, he was again traded, joining his third KHL outfit, Severstal Cherepovets, on 23 December 2018.

On 1 May 2020, with one year remaining under contract, Yakimov was traded by Severstal to perennial contending club SKA Saint Petersburg, in exchange for financial compensation. Yakimov made 6 appearances with SKA before he was traded to HC Sochi in exchange for Daniil Ogirchuk and Pavel Kukshtel on 23 December 2020.

== Career statistics ==
=== Regular season and playoffs ===
			Regular season					Playoffs
Season	Team	League	GP	G	A	Pts	PIM	GP	G	A	Pts	PIM
2011–12	Reaktor	MHL	46	15	10	25	10	2	2	1	3	0
2012–13	Reaktor	MHL	11	6	7	13	2	—	—	—	—	—
2012–13	Dizel Penza	VHL	21	3	6	9	12	—	—	—	—	—
2012–13	HC Izhstal	VHL	16	5	8	13	4	—	—	—	—	—
2013–14	Reaktor	MHL	5	4	2	6	0	2	0	1	1	0
2013–14	Neftekhimik Nizhnekamsk	KHL	33	7	5	12	2	—	—	—	—	—
2014–15	Oklahoma City Barons	AHL	57	12	16	28	18	—	—	—	—	—
2014–15	Edmonton Oilers	NHL	1	0	0	0	0	—	—	—	—	—
2015–16	Bakersfield Condors	AHL	36	5	10	15	10	—	—	—	—	—
2015–16	Nizhnekamsk Neftekhimik	KHL	11	3	1	4	2	4	1	1	2	0
2016–17	Nizhnekamsk Neftekhimik	KHL	50	3	8	11	4	—	—	—	—	—
2016–17	Ariada Volzhsk	VHL	1	0	0	0	0	—	—	—	—	—
2017–18	Neftekhimik Nizhnekamsk	KHL	56	8	3	11	12	5	0	0	0	10
2018–19	Neftekhimik Nizhnekamsk	KHL	27	1	2	3	16	—	—	—	—	—
2018–19	Avangard Omsk	KHL	5	0	0	0	0	—	—	—	—	—
2018–19	Severstal Cherepovets	KHL	18	4	8	12	6	—	—	—	—	—
2019–20	Severstal Cherepovets	KHL	59	9	10	19	14	—	—	—	—	—
2020–21	SKA Saint Petersburg	KHL	6	0	0	0	2	—	—	—	—	—
2021–22	HC Sochi	KHL	10	3	0	3	11	—	—	—	—	—
2021–22	Dynamo Moscow	KHL	19	5	1	6	8	5	1	0	1	6
KHL totals			294	43	38	81	77	14	2	1	3	16
NHL totals			1	0	0	0	0	—	—	—	—	—

=== International ===
Year	Team	Event	Result	GP	G	A	Pts	PIM
2011	Russia	U18	3rd place, bronze medalist(s)	7	1	1	2	2
2011	Russia	IH18	3rd place, bronze medalist(s)	5	0	0	0	0
2012	Russia	U18	5th	6	3	4	7	0
2014	Russia	WJC	3rd place, bronze medalist(s)	7	1	1	2	4
Junior totals				25	5	6	11	6
