= Gustav Possler =

Swedish ice hockey player (born 1994)

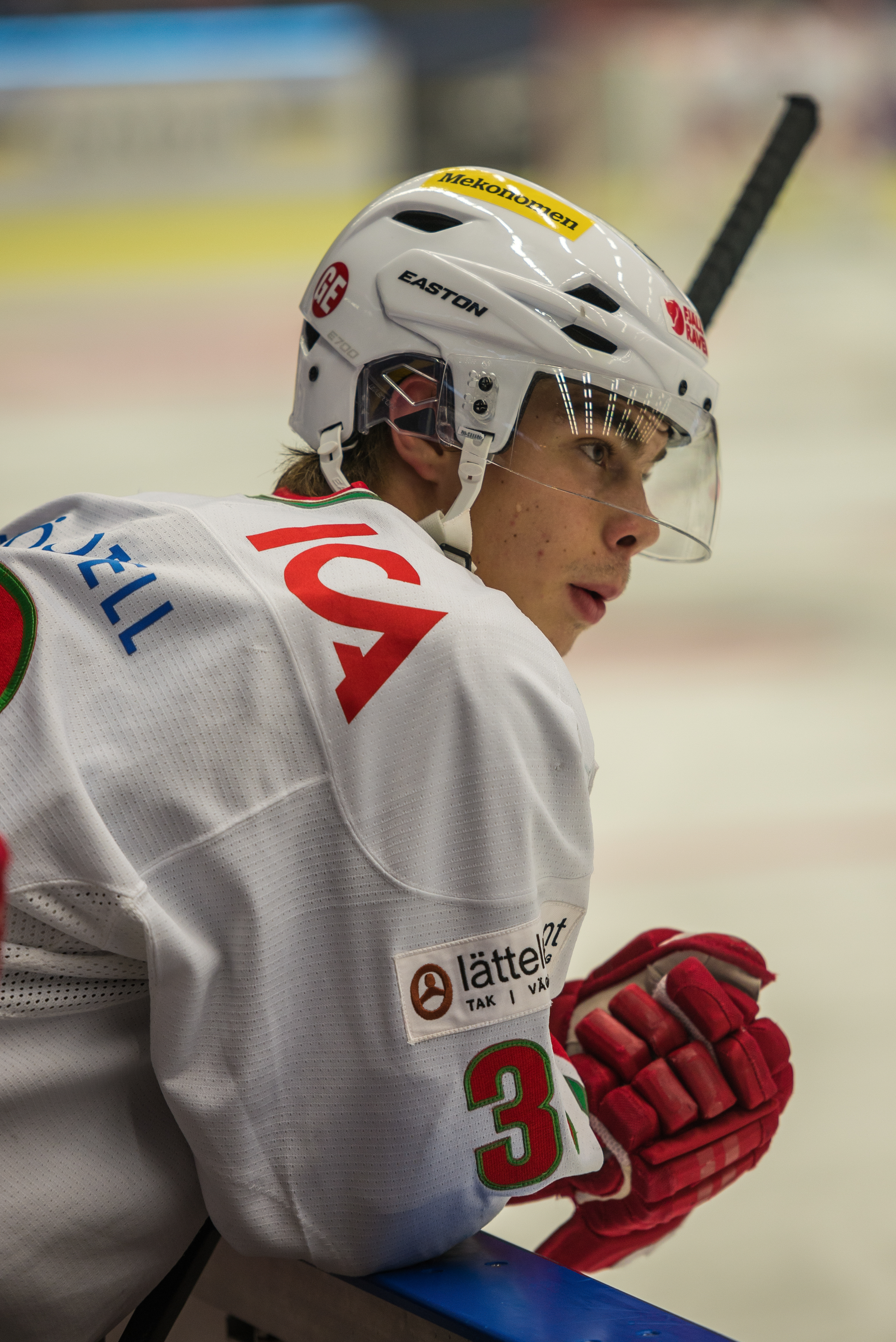
- Gustav Possler 2013
- Born: November 11, 1994 (age 31) Södertälje, Sweden
- Height: 6 ft 0 in (183 cm)
- Weight: 183 lb (83 kg; 13 st 1 lb)
- Position: Winger
- Shoots: Left
- Allsv team Former teams: IF Björklöven; Modo Hockey; Djurgårdens IF; Lukko
- NHL draft: 130th overall, 2013; Buffalo Sabres
- Playing career: 2012–present

Gustav Possler (born November 11, 1994) is a Swedish ice hockey player. He is currently playing with IF Björklöven of the HockeyAllsvenskan (Allsv). Possler was selected by the Buffalo Sabres in the 5th round (130th overall) of the 2013 NHL entry draft.

== Playing career ==
Possler made his Elitserien (now the SHL) debut playing with Modo Hockey during the 2011–12 Elitserien season. After the 2015–16 season, having contributed with 24 points in 52 games but unable to prevent Modo from suffering relegation, Possler opted to remain in the SHL, signing a two-year contract with Djurgårdens IF on April 7, 2016.

== Career statistics ==
=== Regular season and playoffs ===
			Regular season					Playoffs
Season	Team	League	GP	G	A	Pts	PIM	GP	G	A	Pts	PIM
2010–11	Luleå HF	J20	4	0	0	0	0	—	—	—	—	—
2010–11	Modo Hockey	J20	1	1	1	2	0	3	0	0	0	0
2011–12	Modo Hockey	J20	37	23	17	40	14	8	2	1	3	4
2011–12	Modo Hockey	SEL	2	1	0	1	0	—	—	—	—	—
2012–13	Modo Hockey	J20	36	19	21	40	28	7	4	4	8	4
2012–13	Modo Hockey	SEL	7	1	0	1	2	—	—	—	—	—
2012–13	Mora IK	Allsv	3	0	0	0	0	—	—	—	—	—
2013–14	Modo Hockey	SHL	22	8	7	15	4	—	—	—	—	—
2014–15	Modo Hockey	SHL	47	9	12	21	8	—	—	—	—	—
2015–16	Modo Hockey	SHL	52	9	15	24	6	—	—	—	—	—
2016–17	Djurgårdens IF	SHL	21	2	2	4	4	3	1	0	1	0
2017–18	Djurgårdens IF	SHL	41	5	11	16	8	11	2	5	7	0
2018–19	Djurgårdens IF	SHL	26	1	8	9	6	—	—	—	—	—
2019–20	Djurgårdens IF	SHL	26	0	4	4	6	—	—	—	—	—
2019–20	Lukko	Liiga	10	0	1	1	33	—	—	—	—	—
2020–21	IF Björklöven	Allsv	41	4	14	18	8	16	4	8	12	4
2021–22	IF Björklöven	Allsv	52	11	24	35	24	18	3	3	6	2
2022–23	IF Björklöven	Allsv	43	9	11	20	10	11	3	4	7	0
2023–24	IF Björklöven	Allsv	46	11	16	27	18	5	1	1	2	0
2024–25	IF Björklöven	Allsv	49	12	24	36	10	7	3	4	7	0
SHL totals			244	36	59	95	44	14	3	5	8	0

=== International ===
Year	Team	Event	Result	GP	G	A	Pts	PIM
2012	Sweden	WJC18	2nd place, silver medalist(s)	6	4	4	8	0
Junior totals				6	4	4	8	0
