= Jesper Pettersson =

Swedish ice hockey player

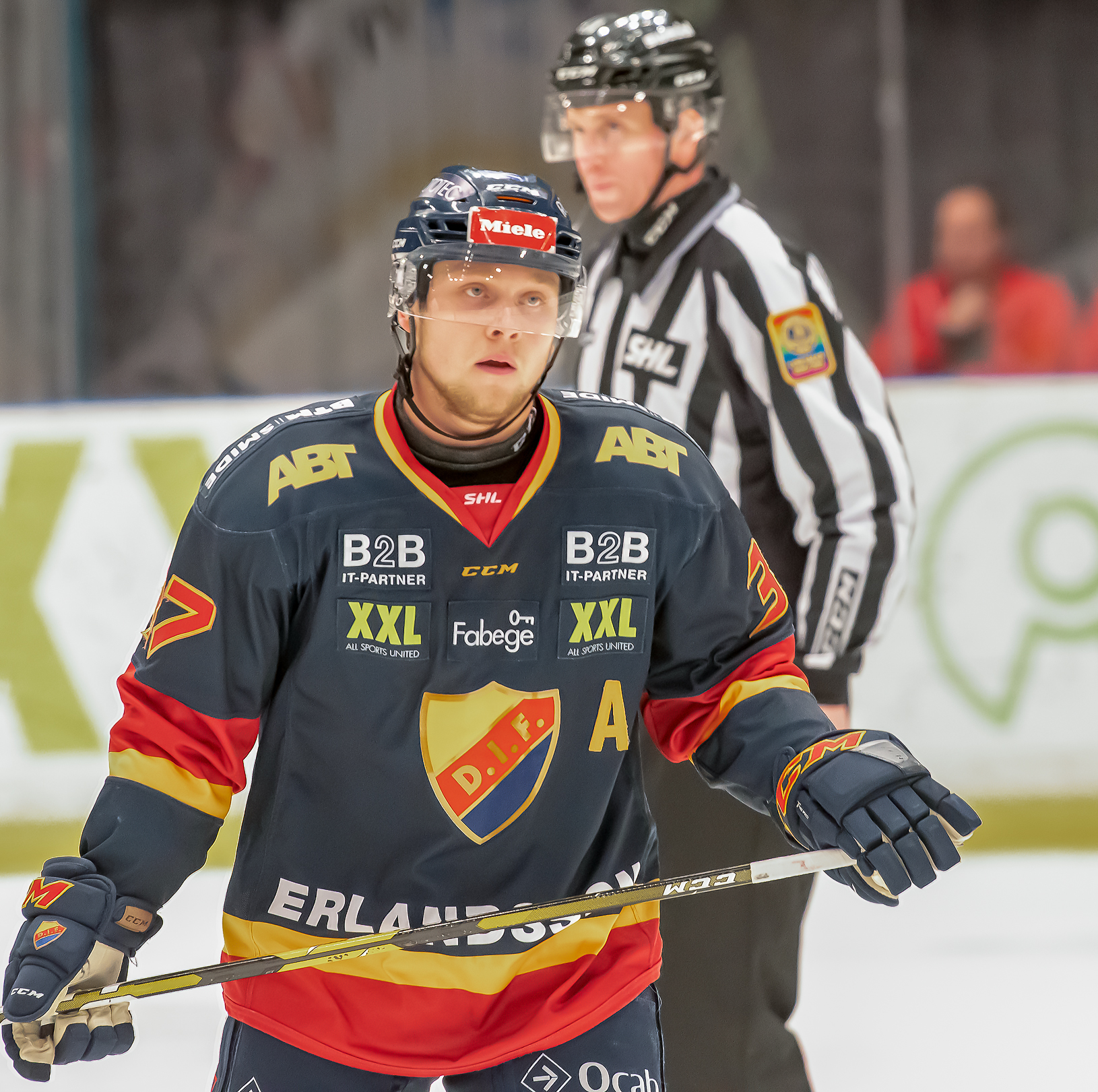
- Pettersson with Djurgårdens IF in 2019.
- Born: July 16, 1994 (age 31) Stockholm, Sweden
- Height: 5 ft 9 in (175 cm)
- Weight: 183 lb (83 kg; 13 st 1 lb)
- Position: Defence
- Shoots: Right
- SHL team Former teams: Djurgårdens IF; Linköping HC; Rögle BK
- NHL draft: 198th overall, 2014; Philadelphia Flyers
- Playing career: 2012–present

Jesper Pettersson (born July 16, 1994) is a Swedish professional ice hockey player who is a defenceman for Djurgårdens IF of the Swedish Hockey League (SHL).

== Playing career ==
He made his Elitserien debut playing with Linköpings HC during the 2012–13 Elitserien season. Pettersson was selected by the Philadelphia Flyers in the 7th round, 198th overall, at the 2014 National Hockey League (NHL) Entry Draft.

On July 14, 2014, Pettersson signed a three-year entry-level contract worth $1.725 million with the Philadelphia Flyers.

After three seasons within the Flyers organization, and with limited prospects of playing in the NHL, Pettersson opted to return to his homeland as an impending restricted free agent, agreeing to a two-year deal with Djurgårdens IF on May 2, 2017.

Following his ninth season in the SHL, Pettersson left Linköping and was signed to a two-year contract with fellow SHL club, Rögle BK, on 15 May 2025.

== Career statistics ==
=== Regular season and playoffs ===
			Regular season					Playoffs
Season	Team	League	GP	G	A	Pts	PIM	GP	G	A	Pts	PIM
2010–11	Linköpings HC	J20	3	0	0	0	0	—	—	—	—	—
2011–12	Linköpings HC	J20	41	3	13	16	30	—	—	—	—	—
2012–13	Linköpings HC	J20	18	3	9	12	14	—	—	—	—	—
2012–13	Linköpings HC	SEL	14	1	2	3	6	—	—	—	—	—
2013–14	Linköpings HC	J20	7	2	4	6	29	1	0	0	0	2
2013–14	Linköpings HC	SHL	48	0	1	1	30	3	0	0	0	0
2014–15	Lehigh Valley Phantoms	AHL	51	2	5	7	35	—	—	—	—	—
2015–16	Lehigh Valley Phantoms	AHL	24	1	2	3	12	—	—	—	—	—
2015–16	Reading Royals	ECHL	43	4	16	20	20	14	1	6	7	8
2016–17	Reading Royals	ECHL	58	4	19	23	40	6	0	2	2	6
2017–18	Djurgårdens IF	SHL	52	4	9	13	30	11	1	1	2	2
2018–19	Djurgårdens IF	SHL	50	3	9	12	51	19	0	8	8	10
2019–20	Djurgårdens IF	SHL	45	0	11	11	24	—	—	—	—	—
2020–21	Djurgårdens IF	SHL	52	7	11	18	34	3	0	0	0	4
2021–22	Linköping HC	SHL	50	5	16	21	77	—	—	—	—	—
2022–23	Linköping HC	SHL	51	0	8	8	20	—	—	—	—	—
2023–24	Linköping HC	SHL	49	3	18	21	68	4	0	0	0	2
2024–25	Rögle BK	SHL	49	0	5	5	26	2	0	0	0	2
SHL totals			460	23	90	113	366	42	1	9	10	20

=== International ===
Year	Team	Event	Result	GP	G	A	Pts	PIM
2011	Sweden	IH18	2nd place, silver medalist(s)	5	1	1	2	0
2012	Sweden	WJC18	2nd place, silver medalist(s)	6	1	1	2	4
2014	Sweden	WJC	2nd place, silver medalist(s)	6	0	0	0	14
Junior totals				17	2	2	4	18
