= Ludwig Byström =

Swedish ice hockey player (born 1994)

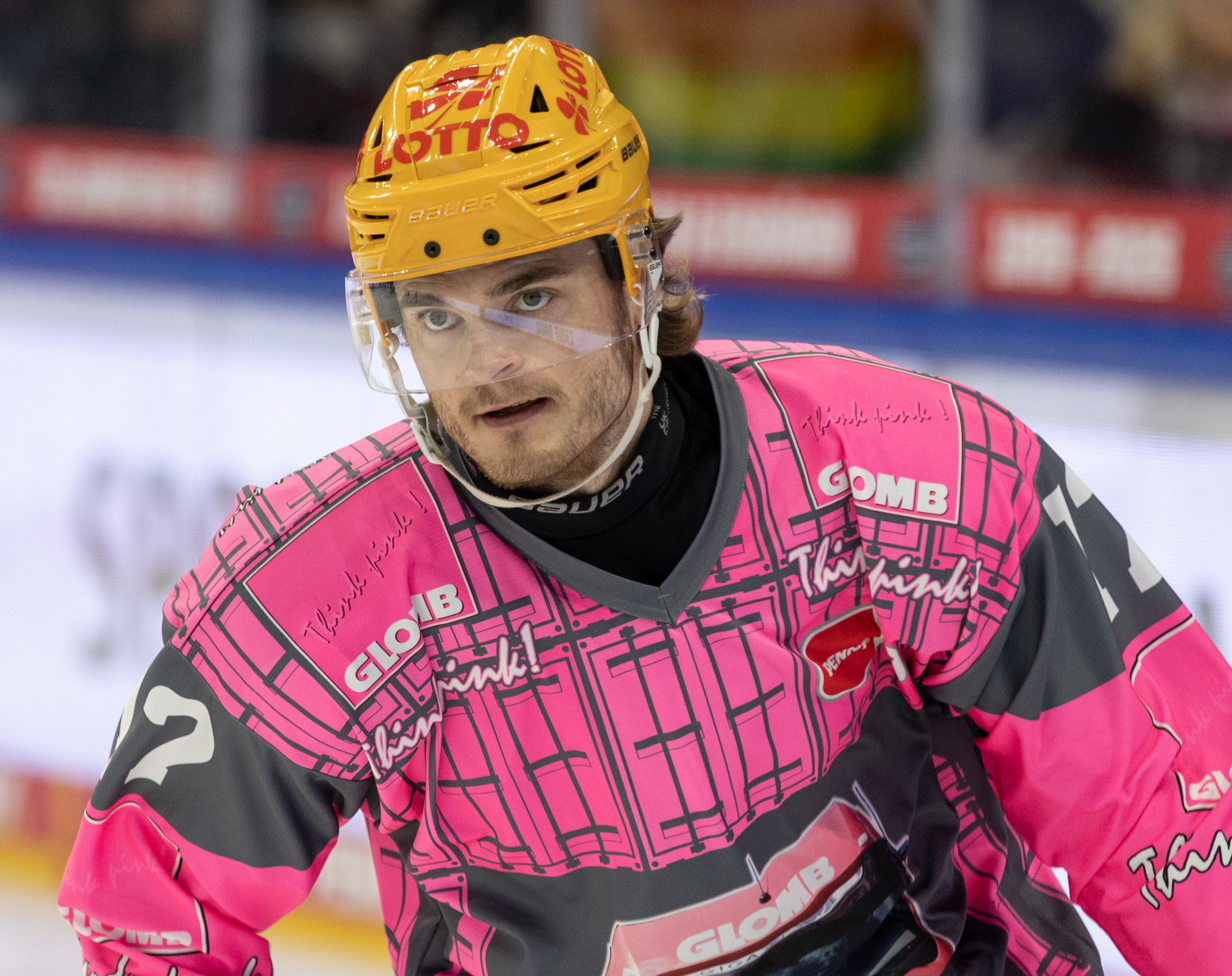
- Byström with the Fischtown Pinguins in 2025
- Born: 20 July 1994 (age 32) Örnsköldsvik, Sweden
- Height: 6 ft 1 in (185 cm)
- Weight: 172 lb (78 kg; 12 st 4 lb)
- Position: Defence
- Shoots: Left
- DEL team Former teams: Fischtown Pinguins; MoDo Hockey; Färjestad BK; Texas Stars; Springfield Thunderbirds; Oulun Kärpät; Nürnberg Ice Tigers
- NHL draft: 43rd overall, 2012; Dallas Stars
- Playing career: 2011–present

Ludwig Byström (born 20 July 1994) is a Swedish professional ice hockey defenceman who is currently playing for Fischtown Pinguins of the Deutsche Eishockey Liga (DEL). He was drafted 43rd overall by the Dallas Stars in the 2012 NHL entry draft.

== Playing career ==
Before being selected in the draft, Byström spent the 2010–11 and 2011–12 seasons playing for Modo Hockey in the Elitserien.

During the 2012 NHL entry draft, Byström was drafted in the second round, 43rd overall by the Dallas Stars. On 16 July 2012, he signed a three-year entry-level contract with the Stars. However, he was then returned on loan to Modo. On 29 April 2013, Byström was reassigned from Modo to league rivals Färjestad BK for two seasons on loan.

After the 2014–15 season with Färjestad BK, Byström embarked on his North American career in reporting to the Stars' American Hockey League (AHL) affiliate in Texas on 12 March 2015.

On 17 June 2017, the Stars re-signed Byström to a one-year, two-way extension worth $650,000. On 10 November 2017 Byström was traded to the Florida Panthers in exchange for Reece Scarlett. He was immediately assigned to Panthers' AHL affiliate, the Springfield Thunderbirds. On 31 May 2018, he signed a one-year contract extension with the Panthers.

Following the 2018–19 season, his fifth season in North America, unable to break into the NHL, Byström as an impending restricted free agent from the Panthers opted to return to Europe, securing a two-year contract with Finnish club, Oulun Kärpät, on 16 May 2019.

== Career statistics ==
=== Regular season and playoffs ===
| | | | Regular season | | | | | Playoffs |
| Season | Team | League | GP | G | A | Pts | PIM | GP | G | A | Pts | PIM |
|---|---|---|---|---|---|---|---|---|---|---|---|---|
| 2009–10 | Modo Hockey | J18 | 14 | 4 | 0 | 4 | 6 | — | — | — | — | — |
| 2009–10 | Modo Hockey | J18 Allsv | 10 | 0 | 0 | 0 | 4 | 5 | 0 | 1 | 1 | 0 |
| 2010–11 | Modo Hockey | J18 | 3 | 0 | 3 | 3 | 2 | — | — | — | — | — |
| 2010–11 | Modo Hockey | J18 Allsv | 6 | 1 | 2 | 3 | 8 | 3 | 0 | 0 | 0 | 10 |
| 2010–11 | Modo Hockey | J20 | 37 | 1 | 10 | 11 | 28 | 6 | 1 | 2 | 3 | 6 |
| 2010–11 | Modo Hockey | SEL | 1 | 0 | 0 | 0 | 0 | — | — | — | — | — |
| 2011–12 | Modo Hockey | J20 | 34 | 7 | 22 | 29 | 101 | 8 | 1 | 3 | 4 | 4 |
| 2011–12 | Modo Hockey | SEL | 20 | 0 | 1 | 1 | 8 | 1 | 0 | 0 | 0 | 0 |
| 2012–13 | Modo Hockey | J20 | 8 | 1 | 2 | 3 | 4 | 7 | 1 | 5 | 6 | 4 |
| 2012–13 | Modo Hockey | SEL | 30 | 3 | 3 | 6 | 2 | — | — | — | — | — |
| 2012–13 | Örebro HK | Allsv | 9 | 0 | 0 | 0 | 2 | — | — | — | — | — |
| 2013–14 | Färjestad BK | SHL | 51 | 3 | 8 | 11 | 24 | 10 | 0 | 0 | 0 | 2 |
| 2013–14 | Färjestad BK | J20 | — | — | — | — | — | 4 | 1 | 2 | 3 | 4 |
| 2014–15 | Färjestad BK | J20 | 1 | 0 | 0 | 0 | 0 | — | — | — | — | — |
| 2014–15 | Färjestad BK | SHL | 38 | 1 | 4 | 5 | 18 | 3 | 0 | 0 | 0 | 4 |
| 2014–15 | Timrå IK | Allsv | 5 | 0 | 1 | 1 | 6 | — | — | — | — | — |
| 2014–15 | Texas Stars | AHL | 12 | 0 | 3 | 3 | 4 | — | — | — | — | — |
| 2015–16 | Texas Stars | AHL | 65 | 2 | 14 | 16 | 20 | 4 | 0 | 0 | 0 | 0 |
| 2016–17 | Texas Stars | AHL | 55 | 2 | 14 | 16 | 20 | — | — | — | — | — |
| 2017–18 | Texas Stars | AHL | 6 | 1 | 0 | 1 | 4 | — | — | — | — | — |
| 2017–18 | Springfield Thunderbirds | AHL | 51 | 3 | 23 | 26 | 29 | — | — | — | — | — |
| 2018–19 | Springfield Thunderbirds | AHL | 71 | 4 | 26 | 30 | 14 | — | — | — | — | — |
| 2019–20 | Kärpät | Liiga | 59 | 5 | 18 | 23 | 24 | — | — | — | — | — |
| 2020–21 | Kärpät | Liiga | 57 | 6 | 18 | 24 | 42 | 5 | 1 | 1 | 2 | 2 |
| 2021–22 | Kärpät | Liiga | 60 | 5 | 24 | 29 | 36 | 7 | 0 | 5 | 5 | 0 |
| 2022–23 | Kärpät | Liiga | 60 | 5 | 17 | 22 | 12 | 3 | 0 | 1 | 1 | 0 |
| 2023–24 | Nürnberg Ice Tigers | DEL | 51 | 3 | 11 | 14 | 12 | 2 | 0 | 0 | 0 | 0 |
| 2024–25 | MoDo Hockey | SHL | 22 | 0 | 1 | 1 | 6 | — | — | — | — | — |
| 2024–25 | Fischtown Pinguins | DEL | 20 | 3 | 4 | 7 | 4 | 5 | 0 | 1 | 1 | 0 |
| SHL totals | | | 162 | 7 | 17 | 24 | 58 | 14 | 0 | 0 | 0 | 6 |
| Liiga totals | | | 236 | 21 | 77 | 98 | 114 | 15 | 1 | 7 | 8 | 2 |

Medal record

Representing Sweden

Ice hockey

World U18 Championships
| Silver medal – second place | 2012 Czech Republic | |

=== International ===
| Year | Team | Event | Result | GP | G | A | Pts | PIM |
|---|---|---|---|---|---|---|---|---|
| 2011 | Sweden | IH18 | 2nd place, silver medalist(s) | 5 | 0 | 4 | 4 | 0 |
| 2012 | Sweden | WJC18 | 2nd place, silver medalist(s) | 6 | 0 | 1 | 1 | 2 |
| Junior totals | | | | 11 | 0 | 5 | 5 | 2 |
