= Hampus Lindholm =

Swedish ice hockey player (born 1994)

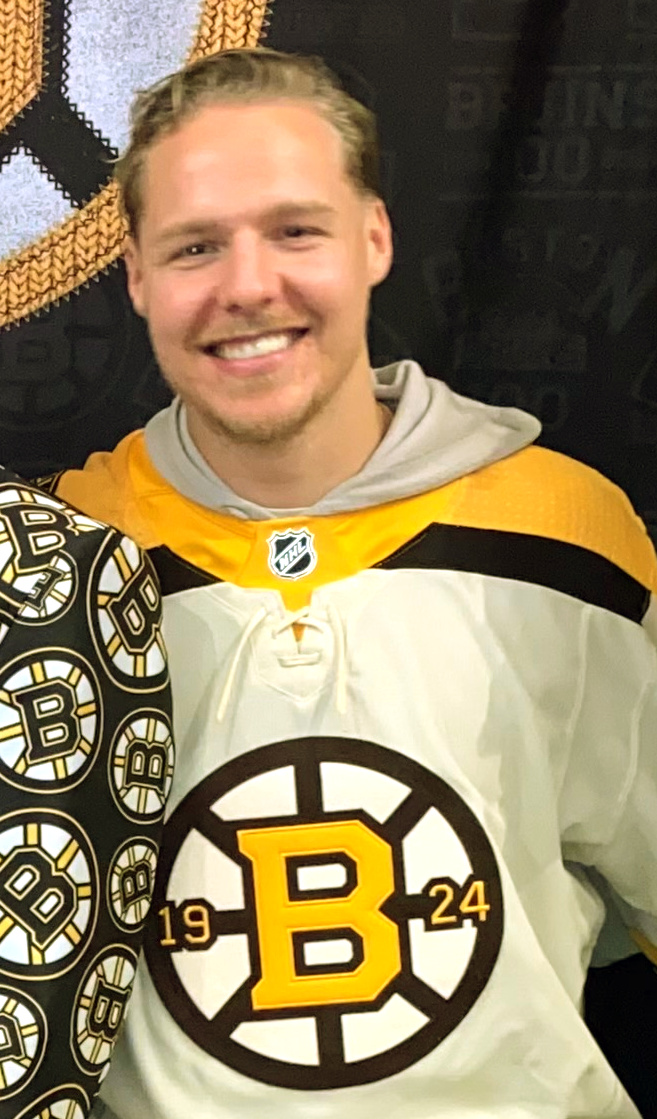
- Lindholm with the Boston Bruins in 2023
- Born: 20 January 1994 (age 32) Helsingborg, Sweden
- Height: 6 ft 4 in (193 cm)
- Weight: 217 lb (98 kg; 15 st 7 lb)
- Position: Defence
- Shoots: Left
- NHL team Former teams: Boston Bruins; Anaheim Ducks
- National team: Sweden
- NHL draft: 6th overall, 2012; Anaheim Ducks
- Playing career: 2011–present

Hampus Lindholm (Swedish pronunciation: [hamːpɵs lɪnːdhɔlm]; born 20 January 1994) is a Swedish professional ice hockey player who is a defenceman and alternate captain for the Boston Bruins of the National Hockey League (NHL). Lindholm began his ice hockey career with Jonstorps IF and previously played with Rögle BK. He then played with the Anaheim Ducks for his first eight seasons in the NHL, before being traded to Boston.

== Playing career ==
=== Amateur ===
In 2009–10, Lindholm played for the Jonstorps U20 team, scoring three points (one goal and two assists) in three games. The following year, he played 39 games for Rögle BK U20, providing four assists.

=== Professional ===
In 2011–12, Lindholm began his professional career with Rögle, playing 20 games and scoring four points, Lindholm was also named the U20 Super Elit League's Best Defenceman. Lindholm was a top prospect who was ranked fourth among European skaters by the NHL Central Scouting Bureau, and he was selected sixth overall in the 2012 NHL entry draft by the Anaheim Ducks. He was considered by some to be a sleeper pick for the draft, with Rob Brodie comparing Lindholm to Erik Karlsson and Mika Zibanejad, two other Swedish prospects who rose sharply in the draft.

==== Anaheim Ducks ====
Lindholm made his North American debut with the Norfolk Admirals, the Ducks' former American Hockey League (AHL) affiliate, in 2012–13. That year, he played 44 games, getting 11 points (one goal and ten assists).

Lindholm scored his first NHL goal on 6 November 2013, against Mike Smith of the Phoenix Coyotes.

After proving himself as one of Anaheim's top defencemen, Lindholm signed a six-year $31.5M contract on 27 October 2016.

==== Boston Bruins ====
In the final year of his contract and set to become an unrestricted free agent, trade rumours on Lindholm were increasing. On 19 March 2022, he was traded to the Boston Bruins for a 2022 first-round pick, a 2023 second-round pick, a 2024 second-round pick, Urho Vaakanainen and John Moore. On 20 March, just after being acquired by Boston, Lindholm was signed to an eight-year, $52M contract extension.

In the early season absence of Charlie McAvoy during the 2022–23 season, Lindholm proved himself to be very valuable to the Bruins. Lindholm and the Bruins went on to have a record-breaking season in 2022–23, winning the most regular season games ever by a team, with 65, before falling to the Florida Panthers in seven games in the first round of the 2023 Stanley Cup playoffs. After being eliminated, it was revealed that Lindholm had played with a fractured foot in the playoffs. Lindholm's successful season ended with him finishing fourth in Norris Trophy voting for best defenceman, as well as being named to the NHL Second All-Star team.

Lindholm hoped to capitalize on his successful season, but was unable to do so in the 2023–24 season, as his production dropped significantly, as he recorded three goals and 23 assists in 70 games. As the season came to a close, Lindholm suffered a lower-body injury in late February 2024, causing him to a miss a few games. However, after a disappointing regular season, Lindholm would turn his game up in the 2024 playoffs. In the Bruins' first-round matchup against the Toronto Maple Leafs, Lindholm scored a goal and three assists in seven games. The series included a two-point performance by Lindholm in the decisive game 7, where he scored the game-tying goal, and assisted on David Pastrňák's series-winning overtime goal.

Lindholm entered the 2024–25 season hoping to bounce back from a disappointing 2023-24 campaign. However, his comeback was put in jeopardy when on November 12, 2024, he got injured blocking a shot in a game against the St. Louis Blues. He left the game, and did not return, sparking concern. The next day, then-Bruins head coach Jim Montgomery announced that Lindholm would be out multiple weeks with a lower-body injury. A couple weeks later, now-interim head coach Joe Sacco said that Lindholm was still weeks away from returning to play. The injury caused Lindholm to be left off Team Sweden for the 4 Nations Face-Off. On January 14, 2025, the Bruins placed Lindholm on Long Term Injured Reserve (LTIR), although Sacco mentioned the same day that Lindholm was skating, albeit not in a competitive nature. On February 25, 2025, Bruins general manager Don Sweeney announced that Lindholm was unlikely to return the rest of the season, and revealed that he had fractured his patella against the Blues. Lindholm finished the season with three goals and four assists in 17 games.

== International play ==
Medal record

Representing Sweden

Men's ice hockey

World Championships
Gold medal – first place	2018 Denmark	

World U18 Championships
Silver medal – second place	2012 Czech Republic	

Lindholm has represented Sweden at the 2012 World U18 Championships, winning the silver medal. In the tournament, he was voted one of the Swedish team's three most valuable players of the tournament. He also won the most valuable player award in the games against Finland and Switzerland.

Lindholm was not able to play for Sweden at the 2013 World Junior Championships due to a concussion.

Lindholm made his Olympic debut for Sweden at the 2026 Winter Olympics, going scoreless in three games.

== Playing style ==
Lindholm is a two-way defenceman who is good at passing the puck. His skating and hockey intelligence have also been admired. Former NHL and Rögle BK defenceman Kenny Jönsson has influenced Lindholm, and Lindholm mentioned Nicklas Lidström and Scott Niedermayer as his other role models.

== Career statistics ==
=== Regular season and playoffs ===
			Regular season					Playoffs
Season	Team	League	GP	G	A	Pts	PIM	GP	G	A	Pts	PIM
2010–11	Rögle BK	J18	4	1	1	2	4	—	—	—	—	—
2010–11	Rögle BK	J18 Allsv	7	1	2	3	6	3	0	2	2	0
2010–11	Rögle BK	J20	39	0	4	4	34	3	0	0	0	0
2011–12	Rögle BK	J18	1	1	3	4	2	—	—	—	—	—
2011–12	Rögle BK	J20	28	5	12	17	16	—	—	—	—	—
2011–12	Rögle BK	Allsv	20	1	3	4	12	10	1	4	5	6
2012–13	Norfolk Admirals	AHL	44	1	10	11	16	—	—	—	—	—
2013–14	Anaheim Ducks	NHL	78	6	24	30	36	11	0	2	2	0
2014–15	Anaheim Ducks	NHL	78	7	27	34	32	16	2	8	10	10
2015–16	Anaheim Ducks	NHL	80	10	18	28	40	7	0	3	3	0
2016–17	Anaheim Ducks	NHL	66	6	14	20	36	17	1	3	4	10
2017–18	Anaheim Ducks	NHL	69	13	18	31	34	4	1	1	2	2
2018–19	Anaheim Ducks	NHL	76	6	22	28	44	—	—	—	—	—
2019–20	Anaheim Ducks	NHL	56	2	21	23	34	—	—	—	—	—
2020–21	Anaheim Ducks	NHL	18	2	4	6	16	—	—	—	—	—
2021–22	Anaheim Ducks	NHL	61	5	17	22	42	—	—	—	—	—
2021–22	Boston Bruins	NHL	10	0	5	5	4	4	0	0	0	0
2022–23	Boston Bruins	NHL	80	10	43	53	56	7	0	0	0	4
2023–24	Boston Bruins	NHL	73	3	23	26	63	13	1	3	4	8
2024–25	Boston Bruins	NHL	17	3	4	7	4	—	—	—	—	—
2025–26	Boston Bruins	NHL	67	5	21	26	58	6	0	2	2	8
NHL totals			829	78	261	339	499	85	5	21	26	42

=== International ===
Year	Team	Event	Result	GP	G	A	Pts	PIM
2012	Sweden	WJC18	2nd place, silver medalist(s)	6	0	4	4	4
2018	Sweden	WC	1st place, gold medalist(s)	10	0	6	6	4
2026	Sweden	OG	7th	3	0	0	0	2
Junior totals				6	0	4	4	4
Senior totals				13	0	6	6	6

== Awards and honours ==
Award	Year	Ref
NHL
NHL All-Rookie Team	2014	
NHL Second All-Star Team	2023	

Awards and achievements
Preceded by Rickard Rakell	Anaheim Ducks first-round draft pick 2012	Succeeded by Shea Theodore
