= Henrik Haapala =

Finnish ice hockey player (born 1994)

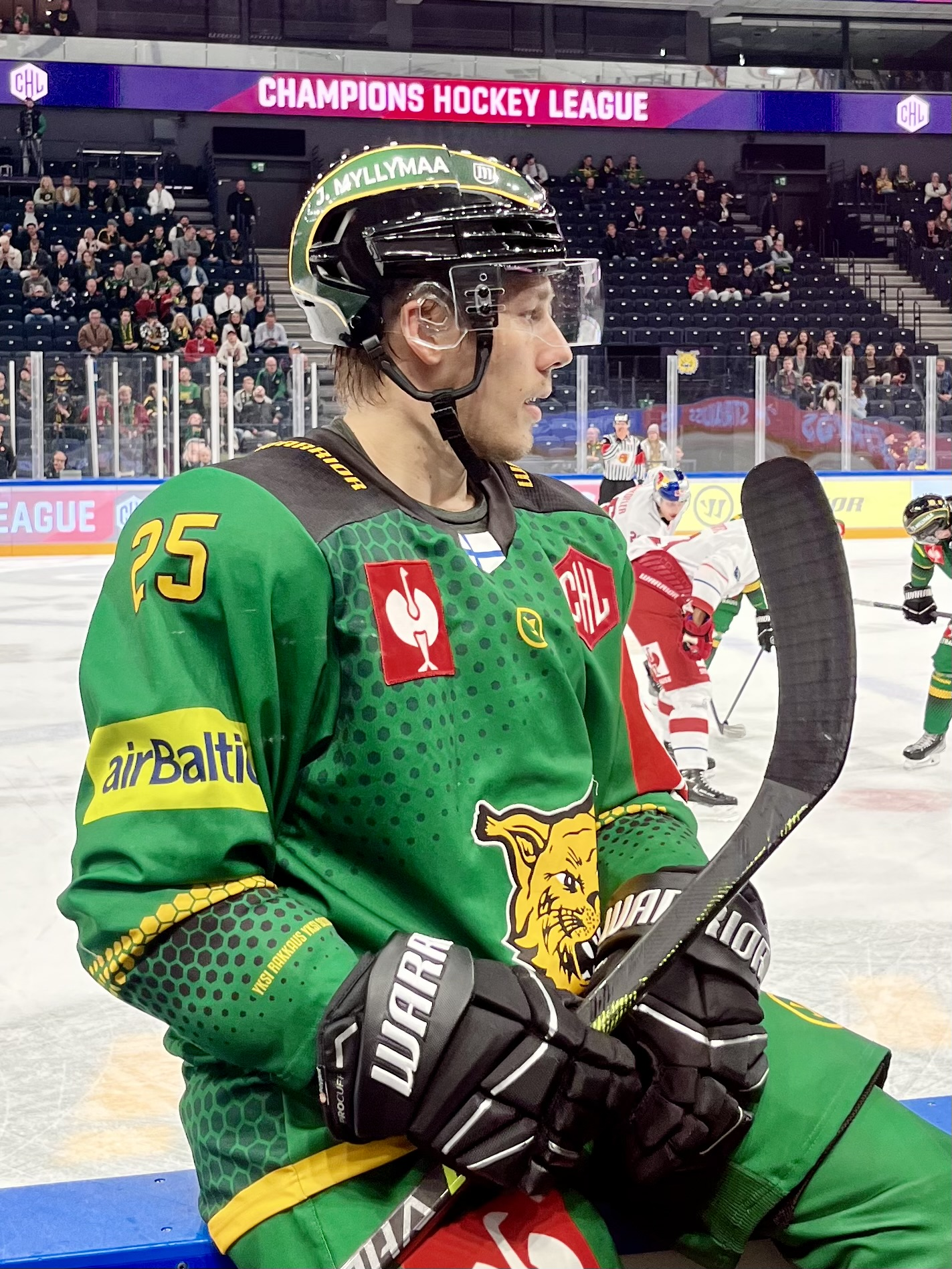
- Born: 28 February 1994 (age 32) Lempäälä, Finland
- Height: 175 cm (5 ft 9 in)
- Weight: 75 kg (165 lb; 11 st 11 lb)
- Position: Left wing
- Shoots: Left
- Liiga team Former teams: Tappara; Florida Panthers; HC Lugano; Jokerit; Ilves; Genève-Servette HC; Lausanne HC; Malmö Redhawks
- NHL draft: Undrafted
- Playing career: 2012–present

Henrik Haapala (born 28 February 1994) is a Finnish professional ice hockey forward who is currently playing for Tappara in the Liiga. He has previously played with the Florida Panthers of the National Hockey League (NHL).

== Playing career ==
He is a skilled offensive forward whose biggest asset is his ability to change his skating direction very rapidly along with his clever passes. He is rather small for a professional hockey player which might be an issue when the play gets physical, though.

Haapala first played as a 14-year old youth within the Tappara system in 2008. He played his first professional game with Tappara in the 2011–12 season. Early in the 2012–13 season he formed a great line with NHL-veteran Ville Nieminen and Aleksander Barkov as his linemates. Haapala had 13 points in 12 games counting from the start of the season, but after an injury, he lost the pace. He played most of spring 2013 for Tappara's junior team.

In the 2013–14, 2014–15 and 2015–16 seasons, he was a regular in Tappara's professional squad, but injuries were holding his development back. There was notable progress in each season however. Haapala agreed to his third contract extension to remain in Tappara by signing a 3-year deal on 12 May 2016.

In the 2016–17 season, Haapala finally made his breakthrough to international level. He scored 15 goals and had 45 assists in 51 regular season games and was awarded the Veli-Pekka Ketola trophy for leading the league in total points at the end of the regular season. In the postseason, he had 2 goals and 7 assists in 16 games as Haapala's team Tappara marched to their second consecutive championship. Haapala represented the men's national team in six games in which he had two goals and an assist.

On 1 June 2017, Haapala was signed as a free agent by the Florida Panthers to a two-year, entry-level contract. He began the 2017–18 season with the Springfield Thunderbirds of the American Hockey League, but was later called up by the Panthers and made his NHL debut on 22 November 2017 against the Toronto Maple Leafs, assisting on a goal by Nick Bjugstad in a 2–1 victory. Haapala appeared in 5 games with the Panthers before returning to Springfield. On 16 February 2018, the Panthers assigned Haapala on loan to his former team, Tappara of the Finnish Liiga.

After returning to attend the Panthers 2018 training camp, Haapala upon failing to make the opening night roster for the 2018–19 season, was reassigned to Europe on loan, joining Swiss outfit, HC Lugano of the NL, on 5 October 2018. In 21 regular season appearances with Lugano, Haapala posted 3 goals and 15 points adding a further 5 points in 3 playoff contests.

As an impending restricted free agent from the Panthers, Haapala opted to continue his career in Europe, signing a two-year contract with Finnish club, Jokerit of the KHL, on 17 May 2019.

Haapala missed the entirety of his final season under contract with Jokerit in 2021–22 through injury, leaving the club after their withdrawal from the KHL and signing a long-term contract with Finnish club, Ilves of the Liiga, on 1 March 2022.

After a season in the Swedish Hockey League with the Malmö Redhawks, Haapala returned for a third stint with his original club, Tappara of the Liiga, after agreeing to a three-year contract on 19 June 2025.

== Career statistics ==
=== Regular season and playoffs ===
			Regular season					Playoffs
Season	Team	League	GP	G	A	Pts	PIM	GP	G	A	Pts	PIM
2010–11	Tappara	FIN U17	1	1	0	1	0	4	2	4	6	0
2010–11	Tappara	FIN U18 Q	11	3	8	11	8	—	—	—	—	—
2010–11	Tappara	FIN U18	15	5	7	12	10	—	—	—	—	—
2010–11	Tappara	FIN U20	18	2	3	5	6	—	—	—	—	—
2011–12	Tappara	FIN U18 Q	7	2	10	12	0	—	—	—	—	—
2011–12	Tappara	FIN U20	46	16	29	45	18	—	—	—	—	—
2011–12	Tappara	SM-l	1	0	0	0	0	—	—	—	—	—
2012–13	Tappara	FIN U20	7	2	5	7	0	8	3	4	7	4
2012–13	Tappara	SM-l	32	3	10	13	12	—	—	—	—	—
2012–13	LeKi	Mestis	4	0	1	1	0	—	—	—	—	—
2013–14	Tappara	FIN U20	2	0	1	1	0	2	0	1	1	0
2013–14	Tappara	Liiga	36	1	3	4	2	15	2	1	3	4
2014–15	Tappara	Liiga	25	4	6	10	14	20	3	7	10	8
2015–16	Tappara	Liiga	47	12	18	30	20	18	3	3	6	10
2016–17	Tappara	Liiga	51	15	45	60	18	16	2	7	9	6
2017–18	Springfield Thunderbirds	AHL	20	3	5	8	4	—	—	—	—	—
2017–18	Florida Panthers	NHL	5	0	1	1	0	—	—	—	—	—
2017–18	Tappara	Liiga	5	2	5	7	0	14	4	6	10	29
2018–19	HC Lugano	NL	21	3	12	15	10	3	1	4	5	2
2019–20	Jokerit	KHL	56	6	23	29	16	6	2	2	4	0
2020–21	Jokerit	KHL	50	8	18	26	24	2	0	0	0	0
2021–22	Ilves	Liiga	9	3	3	6	2	11	2	7	9	0
2022–23	Ilves	Liiga	47	15	32	47	20	11	2	1	3	6
2023–24	Genève-Servette HC	NL	9	3	7	10	4	—	—	—	—	—
2023–24	Lausanne HC	NL	19	4	4	8	8	1	0	0	0	2
2024–25	Malmö Redhawks	SHL	49	4	10	14	18	8	1	5	6	4
Liiga totals			253	55	122	177	88	105	18	32	50	63
NHL totals			5	0	1	1	0	—	—	—	—	—
KHL totals			106	14	41	55	40	8	2	2	4	0

Medal record

Representing Finland

Ice hockey

World Junior Championships
Gold medal – first place	2014 Sweden	

=== International ===
Year	Team	Event	Result	GP	G	A	Pts	PIM
2012	Finland	U18	4th	7	4	6	10	2
2014	Finland	WJC	1st place, gold medalist(s)	7	1	2	3	8
Junior totals				14	5	8	13	10
