= Saku Salminen =

Finnish ice hockey player

- Born: October 20, 1994 (age 31) Helsinki, Finland
- Height: 6 ft 3 in (191 cm)
- Weight: 205 lb (93 kg; 14 st 9 lb)
- Position: Forward
- Shot: Left
- Played for: Jokerit; HPK; SaiPa; Anglet
- NHL draft: 184th overall, 2013; Tampa Bay Lightning
- Playing career: 2012–2019

Saku Salminen (born October 20, 1994) is a Finnish former professional ice hockey player. He most notably played in the Liiga.

== Playing career ==
Salminen was selected by the Tampa Bay Lightning in the 7th round (184th overall) of the 2013 NHL entry draft.

Salminen made his SM-liiga debut playing with Jokerit during the 2012–13 SM-liiga season.

== Personal life ==
Salminen has two hockey-playing brothers, older brother Sami who played for Northern Michigan University and in the Mestis, and younger brother Samu, who was drafted in the 3rd round of the 2021 NHL entry draft by the New Jersey Devils and as of the 2024–25 season plays for the University of Denver. Their father Pekka was a minor professional hockey player in Finland before switching to coaching.

== Career statistics ==
=== Regular season and playoffs ===
			Regular season					Playoffs
Season	Team	League	GP	G	A	Pts	PIM	GP	G	A	Pts	PIM
2010–11	HIFK	Jr. A	13	2	2	4	2	—	—	—	—	—
2011–12	Jokerit	Jr. A	44	9	17	26	16	12	0	1	1	2
2012–13	Jokerit	Jr. A	4	1	2	3	2	—	—	—	—	—
2012–13	Jokerit	SM-liiga	13	1	1	2	12	—	—	—	—	—
2012–13	Kiekko-Vantaa	Mestis	12	1	4	5	0	—	—	—	—	—
2013–14	Kiekko-Vantaa	Mestis	13	0	2	2	16	—	—	—	—	—
2013–14	Jokerit	Jr. A	—	—	—	—	—	4	1	2	3	2
2014–15	HPK	Liiga	36	3	5	8	4	—	—	—	—	—
2015–16	Jokerit	KHL	9	0	1	1	0	—	—	—	—	—
2015–16	TUTO Hockey	Mestis	7	2	2	4	0	—	—	—	—	—
2016–17	SaiPa	Liiga	39	3	4	7	41	—	—	—	—	—
2017–18	SaiPa	Liiga	45	2	3	5	10	9	0	1	1	4
2018–19	Anglet Hormadi Élite	FRA	7	1	2	3	2	—	—	—	—	—
2018–19	ECDC Memmingen	Ger.3	13	3	9	12	2	—	—	—	—	—
2018–19	ESV Kaufbeuren	DEL2	12	2	1	3	2	—	—	—	—	—
2018–19	Vimmerby HC	HockeyEttan	5	5	1	6	4	8	2	2	4	0
Liiga totals			133	9	13	22	67	9	0	1	1	4
KHL totals			9	0	1	1	0	—	—	—	—	—

=== International ===
Year	Team	Event	Result	GP	G	A	Pts	PIM
2012	Finland	U18	4th	7	0	5	5	0
2013	Finland	WJC	7th	6	0	0	0	0
Junior totals				13	0	5	5	0
