= Alexei Bereglazov =

Russian ice hockey player (born 1994)

- Born: April 20, 1994 (age 32) Magnitogorsk, Russia
- Height: 6 ft 4 in (193 cm)
- Weight: 198 lb (90 kg; 14 st 2 lb)
- Position: Defence
- Shoots: Left
- KHL team Former teams: Lokomotiv Yaroslavl; Metallurg Magnitogorsk; Hartford Wolf Pack; Avangard Omsk
- National team: Russia
- NHL draft: Undrafted
- Playing career: 2013–present

Alexei Alexeyevich Bereglazov (Russian: Алексей Алексеевич Береглазов) (born 20 April 1994) is a Russian professional ice hockey defenceman. He is currently playing with Lokomotiv Yaroslavl in the Kontinental Hockey League (KHL).

== Playing career ==
In his native Russia, Bereglazov played as a youth within the junior system of Metallurg Magnitogorsk of the Kontinental Hockey League (KHL). He was selected by Metallurg in the third round, 82nd overall, in the 2011 KHL Junior Draft. Bereglazov made his Kontinental Hockey League (KHL) debut playing with his hometown Magnitogorsk during the 2013–14 KHL season.

After the 2016–17 season, Bereglazov signed as an undrafted free agent to his first North American contract, agreeing to a two-year, entry-level contract with the New York Rangers on April 21, 2017.

After attending the Rangers training camp, Bereglazov was reassigned to begin the 2017–18 season with their American Hockey League (AHL) affiliate, the Hartford Wolf Pack. He appeared in 13 games with the Wolf Pack, posting 4 points, before he was returned on loan to his Russian club, Magnitogorsk, on November 6, 2017. Bereglazov played out the season, contributing with 3 assists in 25 games in Magnitogorsk.

On April 10, 2018, Bereglazov was placed on unconditional waivers by the Rangers, paving the way for a mutual termination of the final year of his contract with the Rangers. He immediately returned to his native Russia, rejoining his original club, Metallurg Magnitogorsk.

After three further seasons with Metallurg, with the cancellation of the playoffs to end the 2019–20 season due to the COVID-19 pandemic, Bereglazov was traded to Avangard Omsk along with Ilya Kablukov in exchange for Taylor Beck on 4 June 2020.

After three seasons with Omsk, Bereglazov left as a free agent and was signed to a two-year contract with Lokomotiv Yaroslavl on 3 May 2023. On 21 May 2025, he became the only player to win 3 Gagarin Cups with 3 different clubs.

== Career statistics ==
=== Regular season and playoffs ===
			Regular season					Playoffs
Season	Team	League	GP	G	A	Pts	PIM	GP	G	A	Pts	PIM
2011–12	Stalnye Lisy	MHL	38	3	3	6	43	3	0	1	1	2
2012–13	Stalnye Lisy	MHL	60	2	14	16	40	3	0	0	0	0
2013–14	Stalyne Lisy	MHL	8	0	3	3	0	4	1	2	3	0
2013–14	Yuzhny Ural Orsk	VHL	10	1	0	1	2	—	—	—	—	—
2013–14	Metallurg Magnitogorsk	KHL	6	0	0	0	2	—	—	—	—	—
2014–15	Metallurg Magnitogorsk	KHL	38	1	5	6	14	10	0	0	0	2
2014–15	Yuzhny Ural Orsk	VHL	2	0	1	1	0	—	—	—	—	—
2015–16	Metallurg Magnitogorsk	KHL	58	3	5	8	37	22	2	6	8	4
2016–17	Metallurg Magnitogorsk	KHL	60	1	18	19	20	13	0	6	6	2
2017–18	Hartford Wolf Pack	AHL	13	1	3	4	14	—	—	—	—	—
2017–18	Metallurg Magnitogorsk	KHL	25	0	3	3	2	11	1	1	2	2
2018–19	Metallurg Magnitogorsk	KHL	60	4	11	15	22	5	0	0	0	8
2019–20	Metallurg Magnitogorsk	KHL	46	3	3	6	10	5	0	0	0	0
2020–21	Avangard Omsk	KHL	57	3	17	20	42	24	1	6	7	12
2021–22	Avangard Omsk	KHL	39	5	8	13	16	13	2	6	8	8
2022–23	Avangard Omsk	KHL	66	8	16	24	24	13	2	2	4	6
2023–24	Lokomotiv Yaroslavl	KHL	63	1	6	7	20	20	1	2	3	0
2024–25	Lokomotiv Yaroslavl	KHL	57	2	7	9	18	21	2	4	6	8
2025–26	Lokomotiv Yaroslavl	KHL	68	2	15	17	18	22	1	7	8	24
KHL totals			643	33	114	147	245	179	12	40	52	76

Medal record

Representing Russia

Ice hockey

World Junior Championships
Bronze medal – third place	2014 Sweden	

=== International ===
Year	Team	Event	Result	GP	G	A	Pts	PIM
2012	Russia	WJC18	5th	6	0	6	6	2
2014	Russia	WJC	3rd place, bronze medalist(s)	7	0	2	2	2
2018	Russia	WC	6th	4	0	0	0	2
Junior totals				13	0	8	8	4
Senior totals				4	0	0	0	2

== Awards and honors ==
Award	Year
KHL
Gagarin Cup (Metallurg Magnitogorsk)	2016
Gagarin Cup (Avangard Omsk)	2021
Gagarin Cup (Lokomotiv Yaroslavl)	2025, 2026
