= Mikko Vainonen =

Finnish ice hockey player (born 1994)

- Born: 11 April 1994 (age 32) Helsinki, Finland
- Height: 6 ft 3 in (191 cm)
- Weight: 222 lb (101 kg; 15 st 12 lb)
- Position: Defence
- Shoots: Left
- team Former teams: Free Agent; HIFK; Milwaukee Admirals; SaiPa; Ässät Pori; Krefeld Pinguine; Vaasan Sport; Orli Znojmo; Dornbirn Bulldogs; HC Frýdek-Místek; SG Cortina; Glasgow Clan
- NHL draft: 118th overall, 2012; Nashville Predators
- Playing career: 2011–present

Mikko Vainonen (born 11 April 1994) is a Finnish professional ice hockey defenceman who was last under contract with Glasgow Clan in the Elite Ice Hockey League (EIHL).

== Early life ==
Mikko Vainonen was a hard-working defenceman in his childhood. He played a lot of floorball with his friends in residential Helsinki.

== Playing career ==
He made his professional debut playing with HIFK of the SM-liiga during the 2011–12 SM-liiga season. He was selected in the fourth round, 118th overall, of the 2012 NHL entry draft by the Nashville Predators. In the following season and pursuit of his NHL ambition, he moved to North America to play major junior after he was drafted in the 2012 CHL import draft in the 1st round, 6th overall by the Kingston Frontenacs of the Ontario Hockey League.

On 24 May 2013, he was signed to a three-year entry-level contract with the Nashville Predators. Vainonen split time between Nashville's farm teams the Milwaukee Admirals of the American Hockey League and the Cincinnati Cyclones of the ECHL over the next two seasons, before being loaned to Liiga's SaiPa to finish the 2014–15 season.

At the start of the 2015–16 NHL season Vainonen and Nashville agreed to mutually terminate his contract, allowing him to seek employment elsewhere. He returned to his native Finland, coming to terms with Ässät Pori of the top-tier Liiga.

After parts of two seasons with German club Krefeld Pinguine of the Deutsche Eishockey Liga, Vainonen returned to the Liiga, securing a one-year deal with his fourth Finnish club, Vaasan Sport, on 29 March 2018.

On June 19, 2019, Vainonen opted to continue in the EBEL agreeing to a one-year contract with the Dornbirn Bulldogs.

In a COVID-19 affected 2020–21 season, Vainonen played for Orli Znojmo, HC Frýdek-Místek, and Italian side SG Cortina.

In August 2021, Vainonen agreed terms with Scottish EIHL side Glasgow Clan for the 2021–22 season.

== Career statistics ==
=== Regular season and playoffs ===
			Regular season					Playoffs
Season	Team	League	GP	G	A	Pts	PIM	GP	G	A	Pts	PIM
2011–12	HIFK	Liiga	8	0	0	0	2	—	—	—	—	—
2012–13	Kingston Frontenacs	OHL	55	4	18	22	42	4	2	1	3	2
2013–14	Kingston Frontenacs	OHL	57	4	14	18	73	7	1	3	4	8
2013–14	Milwaukee Admirals	AHL	2	0	0	0	0	—	—	—	—	—
2014–15	Cincinnati Cyclones	ECHL	31	0	5	5	16	—	—	—	—	—
2014–15	SaiPa	Liiga	19	0	1	1	14	7	0	2	2	33
2015–16	Ässät	Liiga	39	1	5	6	63	—	—	—	—	—
2016–17	Ässät	Liiga	15	0	1	1	6	—	—	—	—	—
2016–17	Krefeld Pinguine	DEL	28	4	1	5	34	—	—	—	—	—
2017–18	Krefeld Pinguine	DEL	44	1	3	4	45	—	—	—	—	—
2018–19	Vaasan Sport	Liiga	11	0	2	2	18	—	—	—	—	—
2018–19	Orli Znojmo	EBEL	28	6	11	17	18	5	2	2	4	12
2019–20	Dornbirn Bulldogs	EBEL	50	3	10	13	38	—	—	—	—	—
2020–21	Orli Znojmo	Czech 2.Liga	1	1	2	3	2	—	—	—	—	—
2020–21	HC Frýdek-Místek	Chance Liga	5	0	0	0	8	—	—	—	—	—
2020–21	SG Cortina	AlpsHL	19	1	5	6	35	5	0	2	2	4
2020–21	SG Cortina	Italy	2	0	0	0	0	—	—	—	—	—
2021–22	Glasgow Clan	EIHL	44	3	9	12	46	—	—	—	—	—
Liiga totals			92	1	9	10	103	7	0	2	2	33

Medal record

Representing Finland

Ice hockey

World Junior Championships
Gold medal – first place	2014 Malmö	

=== International ===
Year	Team	Event	Result	GP	G	A	Pts	PIM
2011	Finland	U17	7th	5	0	2	2	10
2012	Finland	WJC18	4th	7	0	4	4	8
2014	Finland	WJC	1st place, gold medalist(s)	7	0	2	2	4
Junior totals				19	0	8	8	22
