= Troy Bourke =

Canadian ice hockey player (born 1994)

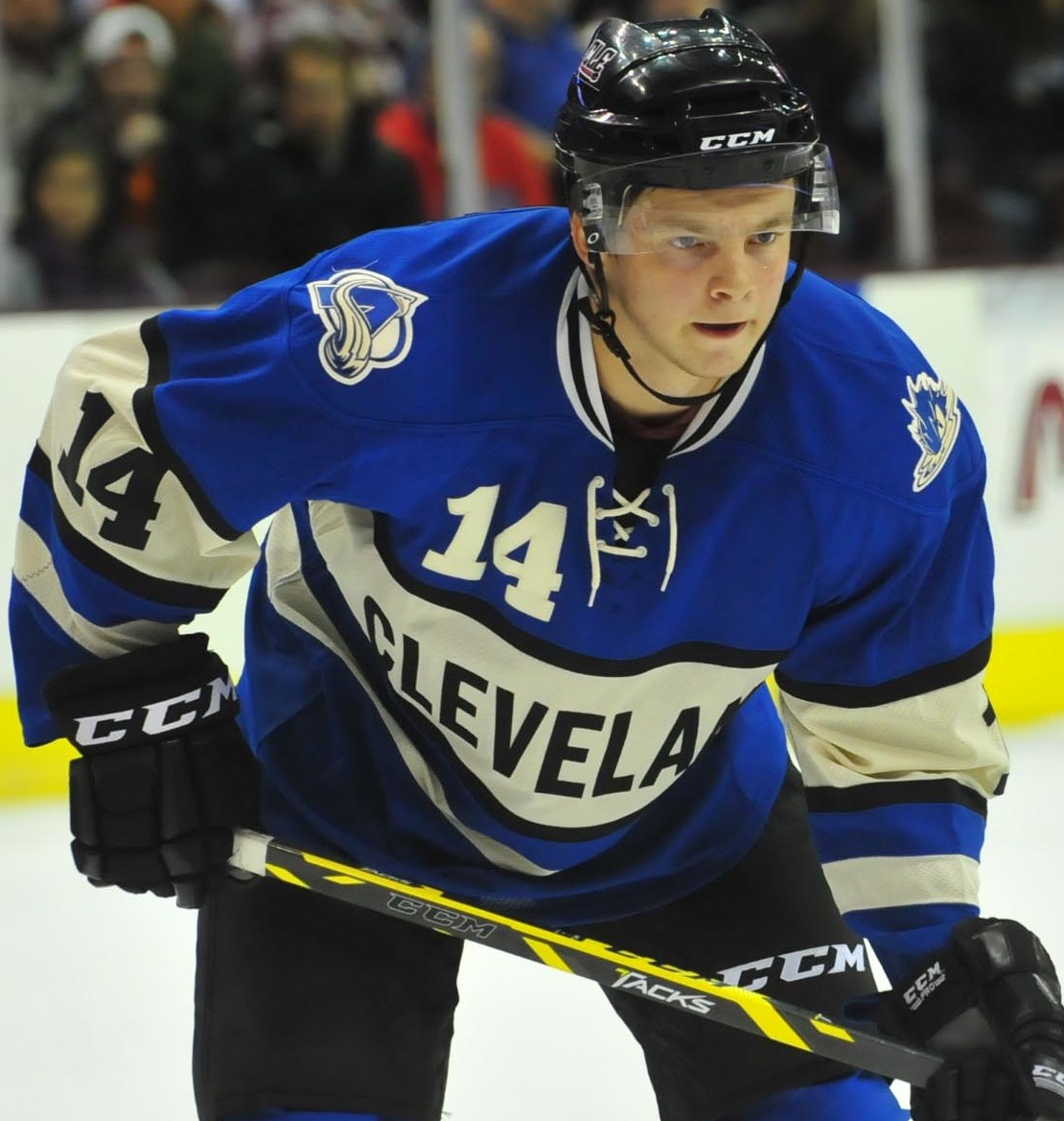
- Bourke with the Lake Erie Monsters in 2014
- Born: March 30, 1994 (age 32) Edmonton, Alberta, Canada
- Height: 5 ft 10 in (178 cm)
- Weight: 170 lb (77 kg; 12 st 2 lb)
- Position: Centre
- Shoots: Left
- team Former teams: Free agent Lake Erie Monsters; San Antonio Rampage; Syracuse Crunch; Schwenninger Wild Wings; Oulun Kärpät; EC Red Bull Salzburg
- NHL draft: 72nd overall, 2012; Colorado Avalanche
- Playing career: 2014–present

Troy Bourke (born March 30, 1994) is a Canadian professional ice hockey center who is currently an unrestricted free agent. He most recently played for EC Red Bull Salzburg of the ICE Hockey League (ICEHL). He was selected 72nd overall, by the Colorado Avalanche, in the 2012 NHL entry draft.

== Playing career ==
Bourke was raised in Onoway, Alberta, and was first selected by the Prince George Cougars 26th overall in the 2009 Western Hockey League bantam draft after a bantam career with the PAC Timberwolves in the AMBHL. In the 2009–10 season, he first played midget hockey in the Alberta Midget Hockey League with the St. Albert Raiders and was selected as the AMHL top player before joining the Cougars at the completion of his midget season to begin his major junior hockey career.

After increasing his production in each of his first two full WHL seasons, Bourke, then an undersized forward, was selected 72nd overall in the 2012 NHL entry draft by the Colorado Avalanche. As captain of the Cougars in his final junior season, Bourke led the team with 56 assists and finished second with 85 points, but was unable to help Prince George qualify for the playoffs in the 2013–14 season. Bourke was then signed to an amateur try-out contract with the Avalanche's AHL affiliate, the Lake Erie Monsters, on March 19, 2014. Two days later, Bourke scored a goal and added two assists in his professional debut, a 5–0 victory over the Rochester Americans. With the Monsters also out of playoff contention, Bourke finished the season with 7 points in 15 games.

On May 29, 2014, Bourke was signed to a three-year entry-level contract with the Avalanche. Upon attending Colorado's NHL training camp, Bourke was reassigned to Lake Erie to begin his first full professional season in 2014–15.

On June 26, 2017, Bourke, a restricted free agent, was not tendered a qualifying contract by the Colorado Avalanche, ending his three-year tenure with the organization and releasing him to free agency. With no NHL contract offers over the summer, Bourke signed a one-year AHL contract with the Syracuse Crunch on September 26, 2017.

Bourke remained within the Crunch organization for two seasons, splitting the 2018–19 season between the AHL and the ECHL affiliate, the Orlando Solar Bears.

As a free agent, Bourke opted to pursue a career in Europe, agreeing to a one-year contract with German club Schwenninger Wild Wings of the Deutsche Eishockey Liga (DEL) on May 16, 2019.

Following two seasons in the DEL, Bourke left Germany as a free agent and was signed to a one-year contract with Finnish club Oulun Kärpät of the Liiga on May 28, 2021. In the 2021–22 season, Bourke placed second in team scoring with Kärpät, recording 12 goals and 24 assists for 36 points in 53 regular season games.

On June 3, 2022, Bourke left Finland as a free agent and continued his European career by signing a one-year contract with Austrian club EC Red Bull Salzburg of the ICEHL.

== Career statistics ==
=== Regular season and playoffs ===
			Regular season					Playoffs
Season	Team	League	GP	G	A	Pts	PIM	GP	G	A	Pts	PIM
2009–10	St. Albert Raiders	AMHL	34	27	26	53	24	5	2	0	2	4
2009–10	Prince George Cougars	WHL	5	3	0	3	4	—	—	—	—	—
2010–11	Prince George Cougars	WHL	68	19	23	42	20	4	0	1	1	0
2011–12	Prince George Cougars	WHL	71	18	38	56	56	—	—	—	—	—
2012–13	Prince George Cougars	WHL	63	15	35	50	37	—	—	—	—	—
2013–14	Prince George Cougars	WHL	69	29	56	85	62	—	—	—	—	—
2013–14	Lake Erie Monsters	AHL	15	3	4	7	6	—	—	—	—	—
2014–15	Lake Erie Monsters	AHL	61	9	13	22	22	—	—	—	—	—
2015–16	San Antonio Rampage	AHL	56	2	7	9	30	—	—	—	—	—
2015–16	Fort Wayne Komets	ECHL	9	5	6	11	6	16	7	9	16	6
2016–17	San Antonio Rampage	AHL	74	9	15	24	20	—	—	—	—	—
2017–18	Syracuse Crunch	AHL	6	1	0	1	2	7	0	0	0	0
2017–18	Adirondack Thunder	ECHL	22	10	22	32	18	5	2	2	4	2
2018–19	Syracuse Crunch	AHL	25	1	5	6	6	—	—	—	—	—
2018–19	Orlando Solar Bears	ECHL	30	11	34	45	18	10	1	4	5	8
2019–20	Schwenninger Wild Wings	DEL	50	13	21	34	40	—	—	—	—	—
2020–21	Schwenninger Wild Wings	DEL	36	15	19	34	14	—	—	—	—	—
2021–22	Oulun Kärpät	Liiga	53	12	24	36	26	7	1	0	1	0
2022–23	EC Red Bull Salzburg	ICEHL	5	0	1	1	0	16	5	6	11	0
2023–24	EC Red Bull Salzburg	ICEHL	42	11	20	31	23	19	8	9	17	4
2024–25	EC Red Bull Salzburg	ICEHL	43	16	26	42	33	13	3	6	9	6
2025–26	EC Red Bull Salzburg	ICEHL	35	15	19	34	13	4	1	1	2	2
AHL totals			237	25	44	69	86	7	0	0	0	0

Medal record

Representing Canada

Ice hockey

World U18 Championships
Bronze medal – third place	2012 Znojmo	

=== International ===
Year	Team	Event	Result	GP	G	A	Pts	PIM
2011	Canada Pacific	U17	3rd place, bronze medalist(s)	6	3	5	8	14
2012	Canada	U18	3rd place, bronze medalist(s)	7	0	7	7	2
Junior totals				13	3	12	15	16

== Awards and honours ==
Award	Year
AMHL
Top Forward	2009–10
