= Atte Mäkinen =

Finnish ice hockey player

- Born: May 17, 1995 (age 31) Tampere, Finland
- Height: 6 ft 3 in (191 cm)
- Weight: 201 lb (91 kg; 14 st 5 lb)
- Position: Defence
- Shot: Right
- Played for: Tappara; Lukko; Dragons de Rouen; Jukurit
- Playing career: 2012–2021

Atte Mäkinen (born May 17, 1995) is a Finnish former professional ice hockey defenceman.

Mäkinen made his SM-liiga debut playing with Tappara during the 2011–12 SM-liiga season.
