= Alexei Filippov (ice hockey, born 1989) =

Russian ice hockey player

- Born: January 5, 1989 (age 37) Sergiyev Posad, Soviet Union
- Height: 6 ft 2 in (188 cm)
- Weight: 185 lb (84 kg; 13 st 3 lb)
- Position: Forward
- Shot: Left
- Played for: Krylya Sovetov Moscow ( RSL)
- NHL draft: Undrafted
- Playing career: 2005–2012

Alexei Filippov (born January 5, 1989) is a Russian former professional ice hockey player.

At the Elite level, Filippov played five games in the Russian Superleague with Krylia Sovetov Moskva during the 2006-07 season.
