= Sven Ziegler =

German ice hockey player

- Sven Ziegler, 2026
- Born: July 1, 1994 (age 32) Nürnberg, Germany
- Height: 6 ft 0 in (183 cm)
- Weight: 174 lb (79 kg; 12 st 6 lb)
- Position: Right wing
- Shoots: Right
- DEL team Former teams: Grizzlys Wolfsburg; Eisbären Berlin; Straubing Tigers; Iserlohn Roosters
- Playing career: 2013–present

Sven Ziegler (born July 31, 1994) is a German ice hockey player. He is currently playing with the Grizzlys Wolfsburg of the Deutsche Eishockey Liga (DEL).

Ziegler made his Deutsche Eishockey Liga debut playing with Eisbären Berlin during the 2012–13 DEL season.

Following the 2017–18 season, his sixth with Berlin, Ziegler left as a free agent to sign a one-year contract with the Straubing Tigers on May 3, 2018.

Ziegler played four seasons with the Roosters before leaving at the conclusion of his contract to sign a two-year deal with Grizzlys Wolfsburg on 18 March 2025.
