= Tobias Törnkvist =

Swedish ice hockey player

- Born: April 14, 1994 (age 31) Helsingborg, Sweden
- Height: 6 ft 1 in (185 cm)
- Weight: 196 lb (89 kg; 14 st 0 lb)
- Position: Right wing
- Shoots: Right
- SHL team: Rögle BK
- Playing career: 2012–present

Tobias Törnkvist (born April 14, 1994) is a Swedish ice hockey player. He is currently playing with Rögle BK of the Swedish Hockey League (SHL).

Törnkvist made his Elitserien (now the SHL) debut playing with Rögle BK during the 2012–13 Elitserien season.
