= Petr Šidlík =

Czech ice hockey player

- Born: January 18, 1994 (age 32) Jihlava, Czech Republic
- Height: 5 ft 11 in (180 cm)
- Weight: 183 lb (83 kg; 13 st 1 lb)
- Position: Defense
- Shot: Left
- Czech team Former teams: PSG Berani Zlín; Victoriaville Tigres; HC Karlovy Vary
- NHL draft: Undrafted
- Playing career: 2010–2022

Petr Šidlík (born January 18, 1994) is a Czech professional ice hockey player. He was play for Piráti Chomutov of the Czech Extraliga.

Šidlík made his Czech Extraliga debut playing with HC Karlovy Vary during the 2014-15 Czech Extraliga season.
