= Samu Markkula =

Finnish ice hockey player

- Born: February 27, 1994 (age 32) Jyväskylä, Finland
- Height: 5 ft 9 in (175 cm)
- Weight: 174 lb (79 kg; 12 st 6 lb)
- Position: Left wing
- Shoots: Left
- SM-liiga team: JYP Jyväskylä
- NHL draft: Undrafted
- Playing career: 2012–present

Samu Markkula (born February 27, 1994) is a Finnish professional ice hockey player. He currently plays for JYP Jyväskylä of the SM-liiga.

Markkula made his SM-liiga debut with JYP Jyväskylä during the 2012–13 SM-liiga season.
