= Matěj Zadražil =

Czech ice hockey forward

- Born: February 12, 1994 (age 32) Sokolov, Czech Republic
- Height: 6 ft 3 in (191 cm)
- Weight: 220 lb (100 kg; 15 st 10 lb)
- Position: Centre
- Shoots: Left
- Chance Liga team Former teams: HC Dukla Jihlava; HC Karlovy Vary
- Playing career: 2014–present

Matěj Zadražil (born February 12, 1994) is a Czech professional ice hockey centre for HC Dukla Jihlava of the Chance Liga.

Zadražil has previously played 30 games in the Czech Extraliga for HC Karlovy Vary. He joined Dukla Jihlava on May 1, 2020.

Zadražil has represented the Czech Republic at junior level, playing in the 2012 IIHF World U18 Championships.
