= Thomas Studer =

Swiss computer scientist (born 1972)

Thomas Studer (born April 4, 1972), is professor at the Computer Science Institute at the University of Bern. He is a specialist in logic and theoretical computer science.

He has a degree in mathematics, computer science, and philosophy from the University of Bern; he earned his PhD in 2011. He was the senior software engineer at Crosspoint Informatik before joining the faculty at the university.

He is elected presidium member of the Platform Mathematics, Astronomy and Physics of the Swiss Academy of Science.

Since 2014 he is president of the Swiss Society for Logic and Philosophy of Science.

== Bibliography ==
- Relationale Datenbanken - Von den theoretischen Grundlagen zu Anwendungen mit PostgreSQL (2016, Springer Vieweg)
- Kahle, Reinhard, Strahm, Thomas, Studer, Thomas (eds.): Advances in Proof Theory (2016, Birkhäuser)
- Guram Bezhanishvili, Giovanna D'Agostino, George Metcalfe and Thomas Studer (eds.): Advances in Modal Logic - Volume 12 (2018 College Publication)
