= Aleksi Mustonen =

Finnish ice hockey player

- Born: 28 March 1995 (age 29); Helsinki, Finland
- Height: 5 ft 9 in (175 cm)
- Weight: 161 lb (73 kg; 11 st 7 lb)
- Position: Forward
- Shoots: Left
- Liiga team Former teams: Ilves; Jokerit
- NHL draft: Undrafted
- Playing career: 2012–present

Aleksi Mustonen (born 28 March 1995) is a Finnish ice hockey player. He currently plays with Ilves of the Finnish Liiga.

He made his SM-liiga debut playing with Jokerit during the 2012–13 SM-liiga season.
