= Rasmus Kulmala =

Finnish ice hockey player

- Born: June 21, 1994 (age 31) Alastaro, Finland
- Height: 5 ft 8 in (173 cm)
- Weight: 157 lb (71 kg; 11 st 3 lb)
- Position: Forward
- Shoots: Left
- ICEHL team Former teams: Fehérvár AV19; TPS; TUTO Hockey; Tappara; HC Shakhtyor Soligorsk; Orlik Opole; DVTK Jegesmedvék; Ferencvárosi TC
- National team: Hungary
- Playing career: 2011–present

Rasmus Kulmala (born June 21, 1994) is a Finnish-born Hungarian professional ice hockey forward who plays for Fehérvár AV19 of the ICE Hockey League (ICEHL).

Kulmala made his SM-liiga debut playing with HC TPS during the 2011–12 SM-liiga season.
