= Alexei Filippov (ice hockey, born 1994) =

Russian ice hockey player (born 1994)

- Born: March 8, 1994 (age 31) Chelyabinsk, Russia
- Height: 6 ft 3 in (191 cm)
- Weight: 196 lb (89 kg; 14 st 0 lb)
- Position: Forward
- Shoots: Left
- KHL team: Traktor Chelyabinsk
- NHL draft: Undrafted
- Playing career: 2013–present

Alexei Filippov (born March 8, 1994) is a Russian professional ice hockey player. He is currently playing with Traktor Chelyabinsk of the Kontinental Hockey League (KHL).

On December 27, 2013, Filippov made his Kontinental Hockey League debut playing with Traktor Chelyabinsk during the 2013–14 KHL season.
