= 2020 Gagarin Cup playoffs =

Tournament details
- Dates: 1 March – 25 April 2020 (scheduled); 1–12 March 2020 (actual)
- Teams: 16

Tournament statistics
- Scoring leader(s): Linus Omark (Salavat Yulaev Ufa) (12 points)

The 2020 Gagarin Cup playoffs of the Kontinental Hockey League (KHL) began on 1 March 2020, with the top eight teams from each of the conferences, following the conclusion of the 2019–20 KHL regular season. The playoffs were scheduled to finish no later than 25 April 2020.

Due to the COVID-19 pandemic, the second round of the playoffs were initially delayed, but on 25 March 2020, the playoffs were called off.

== Playoff seeds ==
After the regular season, the standard 16 teams qualified for the playoffs.

=== Western Conference ===
The regular season winners and Continental Cup winners were CSKA Moscow with 94 points.

Pos	Team	Pld	W	OTW	OTL	L	GF	GA	GD	Pts
1	CSKA Moscow (Y, Z)	62	40	5	4	13	202	99	+103	94
2	SKA Saint Petersburg (X)	62	30	14	5	13	179	118	+61	93
3	Jokerit	62	28	10	8	16	184	164	+20	84
4	Dynamo Moscow	62	29	8	8	17	182	144	+38	82
5	Spartak Moscow	62	26	8	9	19	173	143	+30	77
6	Lokomotiv Yaroslavl	62	25	9	5	23	170	151	+19	73
7	Vityaz Podolsk	62	19	8	11	24	137	166	−29	65
8	Torpedo Nizhny Novgorod	62	22	7	6	27	165	167	−2	64

Source: KHL
(X) Won division; (Y) Won conference; (Z) Won Continental Cup

=== Eastern Conference ===
Ak Bars Kazan were the Eastern Conference regular season winners with 93 points.

Pos	Team	Pld	W	OTW	OTL	L	GF	GA	GD	Pts
1	Ak Bars Kazan (Y)	62	38	6	5	13	178	121	+57	93
2	Barys Nur-Sultan (X)	62	31	7	8	16	156	137	+19	84
3	Avangard Omsk	62	30	7	9	16	163	120	+43	83
4	Avtomobilist Yekaterinburg	62	24	11	8	19	168	151	+17	78
5	Sibir Novosibirsk	62	27	7	6	22	139	143	−4	74
6	Salavat Yulaev Ufa	62	23	6	10	23	153	144	+9	68
7	Metallurg Magnitogorsk	62	20	8	9	25	138	145	−7	65
8	Neftekhimik Nizhnekamsk	62	21	7	8	26	162	158	+4	64

Source: KHL
(X) Won division; (Y) Won conference

== Playoff bracket ==
In each round, the highest remaining seed in each conference is matched against the lowest remaining seed. The higher-seeded team is awarded home ice advantage. In the Gagarin Cup Finals, home ice is determined based on regular season points. Each best-of-seven series follows a 2–2–1–1–1 format: the higher-seeded team plays at home for games one and two (and games five and seven, if necessary), and the lower-seeded team is at home for games three and four (and game six, if necessary).

The 2020 Gagarin Cup playoffs started on 1 March 2020, and were scheduled to finish no later than 25 April 2020. The top eight teams from each of the twelve-team conferences qualified for the playoffs.

On 25 March 2020, the remaining scheduled games were cancelled. The bracket below shows the position of each team at the time of the cancellation of the playoffs.

Conference Quarterfinals	Conference Semifinals
1	(Russia) Ak Bars	4
8	(Russia) Neftekhimik	0
1	(Russia) Ak Bars
6	(Russia) Salavat Yulaev
2	(Kazakhstan) Barys	4
7	(Russia) Metallurg	1
Eastern Conference
3	(Russia) Avangard	2
6	(Russia) Salavat Yulaev	4
2	(Kazakhstan) Barys (Note: On 16 March 2020, Barys voluntarily withdrew from the playoffs due to the COVID-19 pandemic.)
5	(Russia) Sibir	w/o
4	(Russia) Avtomobilist	1
5	(Russia) Sibir	4
1	(Russia) CSKA	4
8	(Russia) Torpedo	0
1	(Russia) CSKA
4	(Russia) Dynamo
2	(Russia) SKA	4
7	(Russia) Vityaz	0
Western Conference
3	(Finland) Jokerit	4
6	(Russia) Lokomotiv	2
2	(Russia) SKA	w/o
3	(Finland) Jokerit (Note: On 14 March 2020, Jokerit voluntarily withdrew from the playoffs due to the COVID-19 pandemic.)
4	(Russia) Dynamo	4
5	(Russia) Spartak	2

Conference Finals
(Russia)
5	(Russia) Sibir
(Russia)
2	(Russia) SKA

Gagarin Cup Finals
E	(Russia)
W	(Russia)

== First round ==
=== Eastern Conference first round ===
==== (1) Ak Bars Kazan vs. (8) Neftekhimik Nizhnekamsk ====
Ak Bars Kazan finished first in the Eastern Conference earning 93 points, winning their second Eastern Conference title in three years. Their opponents and Kharlamov Division rivals Neftekhimik Nizhnekamsk finished as the Eastern Conference's eighth seed, earning 64 points. The teams had met once previously in the playoffs with Ak Bars Kazan sweeping the first round series in 2013 – having finished as the number 1 and 8 seeds respectively in the 2012–13 season. Having played four times during the season, both teams won two games each.

2 March	Ak Bars Kazan	4–1	Neftekhimik Nizhnekamsk	TatNeft Arena	Recap
Matt Frattin (1) – 07:07; Emil Galimov (1) – 12:47		First period	14:08 – Marat Khairullin (1)
No scoring		Second period	No scoring
Mikhail Glukhov (1) – 01:28; Matt Frattin (2; PPG) – 14:06		Third period	No scoring
Timur Bilyalov (32 shots / 31 saves)		Goalie stats	Konstantin Barulin (29 shots / 25 saves)

4 March	Ak Bars Kazan	5–1	Neftekhimik Nizhnekamsk	TatNeft Arena	Recap
Artyom Lukoyanov (1) – 06:00; Dmitri Voronkov (1) – 11:34; Matt Frattin (3) – 12:58		First period	01:31 – Pavel Kulikov (1)
Stanislav Galiev (1) – 09:36; Justin Azevedo (1) – 13:59		Second period	No scoring
No scoring		Third period	No scoring
Timur Bilyalov (32 shots / 31 saves)		Goalie stats	Alexander Sharychenkov (29 shots / 24 saves); Konstantin Barulin (9 shots / 9 saves)

6 March	Neftekhimik Nizhnekamsk	1–2	OT	Ak Bars Kazan	Neftekhimik Ice Palace	Recap
No scoring		First period		No scoring
No scoring		Second period		No scoring
Ildar Shiksatdarov (1) – 16:48		Third period		03:52 – Emil Galimov (2)
No scoring		First overtime period		12:13 – Emil Galimov (3)
Konstantin Barulin (50 shots / 48 saves)		Goalie stats		Timur Bilyalov (35 shots / 34 saves)

8 March	Neftekhimik Nizhnekamsk	0–1	Ak Bars Kazan	Neftekhimik Ice Palace	Recap
No scoring		First period	No scoring
No scoring		Second period	06:30 – Stanislav Galiev (2)
No scoring		Third period	No scoring
Konstantin Barulin (27 shots / 26 saves)		Goalie stats	Timur Bilyalov (21 shots / 21 saves)

Ak Bars Kazan win 4–0

==== (2) Barys Nur-Sultan vs. (7) Metallurg Magnitogorsk ====
Barys Nur-Sultan finished second in the Eastern Conference earning 84 points, winning their second consecutive Chernyshev Division title. Their opponents Metallurg Magnitogorsk finished as the Eastern Conference's seventh seed, earning 65 points. The teams had met twice previously in the playoffs with Metallurg Magnitogorsk winning both previous series – a game 7 decider in the first round in 2012, and a second round sweep in 2017. Barys Nur-Sultan won three out of the four games to be held between the teams during the 2019–20 season.

1 March	Barys Nur-Sultan	4–0	Metallurg Magnitogorsk	Barys Arena	Recap
Curtis Valk (1; PPG) – 13:37		First period	No scoring
Atte Ohtamaa (1) – 18:53		Second period	No scoring
Iiro Pakarinen (1; ENG) – 17:48; Darren Dietz (1; PPG) – 19:12		Third period	No scoring
Edward Pasquale (34 shots / 34 saves)		Goalie stats	Vasily Koshechkin (35 shots / 32 saves)

3 March	Barys Nur-Sultan	0–3	Metallurg Magnitogorsk	Barys Arena	Recap
No scoring		First period	No scoring
No scoring		Second period	04:40 – Andrej Nestrašil (1); 07:19 – Sergei Mozyakin (1); 16:52 – Andrej Nestrašil (2; PPG)
No scoring		Third period	No scoring
Edward Pasquale (27 shots / 24 saves); Henrik Karlsson (7 shots / 7 saves)		Goalie stats	Vasily Koshechkin (35 shots / 35 saves)

5 March	Metallurg Magnitogorsk	1–2	OT	Barys Nur-Sultan	Arena Metallurg	Recap
No scoring		First period		No scoring
No scoring		Second period		No scoring
Sergei Mozyakin (2) – 06:12		Third period		08:47 – Darren Dietz (2; PPG)
No scoring		First overtime period		00:31 – Linus Videll (1)
Vasily Koshechkin (37 shots / 35 saves)		Goalie stats		Edward Pasquale (32 shots / 31 saves)

7 March	Metallurg Magnitogorsk	0–2	Barys Nur-Sultan	Arena Metallurg	Recap
No scoring		First period	19:33 – Anton Sagadeyev (1)
No scoring		Second period	No scoring
No scoring		Third period	15:22 – Dustin Boyd (1)
Vasily Koshechkin (25 shots / 23 saves)		Goalie stats	Edward Pasquale (39 shots / 39 saves)

9 March	Barys Nur-Sultan	5–2	Metallurg Magnitogorsk	Barys Arena	Recap
Anton Sagadeyev (2) – 03:08; Darren Dietz (3) – 05:47; Anton Sagadeyev (3) – 14:24		First period	05:16 – Nikolay Kulemin (1)
Pavel Akolzin (1) – 05:31		Second period	08:01 – Artyom Minulin (1)
Pavel Akolzin (2; ENG) – 19:40		Third period	No scoring
Edward Pasquale (19 shots / 17 saves)		Goalie stats	Vasily Koshechkin (27 shots / 23 saves)

Barys Nur-Sultan win 4–1

==== (3) Avangard Omsk vs. (6) Salavat Yulaev Ufa ====
Avangard Omsk finished third in the Eastern Conference earning 83 points. Their opponents and Chernyshev Division rivals Salavat Yulaev Ufa finished as the Eastern Conference's sixth seed, earning 68 points. The teams had met four times previously in the playoffs – two wins apiece – with this meeting being the third consecutive year in which the teams had met one another. Avangard Omsk won all four games to be held between the teams during the 2019–20 season.

1 March	Avangard Omsk	5–2	Salavat Yulaev Ufa	Balashikha Arena	Recap
Sergei Shumakov (1; PPG) – 16:34		First period	14:31 – Linus Omark (1)
Kirill Semyonov (1) – 03:56; Andrei Stas (1) – 09:01; Kirill Semyonov (2) – 18:07; Valentin Pyanov (1; PPG) – 19:28		Second period	17:30 – Teemu Hartikainen (1)
No scoring		Third period	No scoring
Igor Bobkov (28 shots / 26 saves)		Goalie stats	Juha Metsola (37 shots / 32 saves); Andrei Kareyev (8 shots / 8 saves)

3 March	Avangard Omsk	2–3	OT	Salavat Yulaev Ufa	Balashikha Arena	Recap
No scoring		First period		No scoring
Semyon Koshelev (1) – 11:08		Second period		10:42 – Grigori Panin (1)
Pavel Dedunov (1) – 11:12		Third period		19:54 – Sakari Manninen (1; EA)
No scoring		First overtime period		07:20 – Dmitri Kugryshev (1)
Igor Bobkov (39 shots / 36 saves)		Goalie stats		Juha Metsola (25 shots / 23 saves)

5 March	Salavat Yulaev Ufa	6–3	Avangard Omsk	Ufa Arena	Recap
No scoring		First period	01:23 – Sergei Shumakov (2); 16:20 – Alexei Emelin (1)
Alexander Burmistrov (1) – 04:43; Pyotr Khokhryakov (1) – 08:43		Second period	No scoring
Sakari Manninen (2) – 00:50; Teemu Hartikainen (2) – 06:20; Teemu Hartikainen (3) – 08:10; Vladimir Zharkov (1; ENG) – 18:12		Third period	14:05 – Brandon McMillan (1; PPG)
Juha Metsola (35 shots / 32 saves)		Goalie stats	Igor Bobkov (28 shots / 23 saves); Emil Garipov (7 shots / 7 saves)

7 March	Salavat Yulaev Ufa	1–5	Avangard Omsk	Ufa Arena	Recap
No scoring		First period	03:01 – Alexei Potapov (1); 06:08 – Kirill Semyonov (3); 18:11 – Cody Franson (1; PPG)
No scoring		Second period	10:12 – Alexei Emelin (2); 17:13 – Kirill Semyonov (4)
Teemu Hartikainen (4) – 06:26		Third period	No scoring
Juha Metsola (15 shots / 11 saves); Andrei Kareyev (6 shots / 5 saves)		Goalie stats	Igor Bobkov (37 shots / 36 saves)

9 March	Avangard Omsk	3–6	Salavat Yulaev Ufa	Balashikha Arena	Recap
Pavel Dedunov (2; SHG) – 05:22		First period	06:16 – Pyotr Khokhryakov (2; PPG)
Ville Pokka (1) – 02:33		Second period	10:15 – Philip Larsen (1; PPG); 14:42 – Vladimir Zharkov (2)
Sergei Shumakov (3) – 17:28		Third period	05:22 – Sakari Manninen (3); 08:00 – Vladislav Kartayev (1; SHG); 15:20 – Pyotr Khokhryakov (3)
Igor Bobkov (22 shots / 16 saves)		Goalie stats	Juha Metsola (41 shots / 38 saves)

11 March	Salavat Yulaev Ufa	4–1	Avangard Omsk	Ufa Arena	Recap
Sakari Manninen (4) – 15:09; Teemu Hartikainen (5; PPG) – 17:01		First period	No scoring
Dmitri Kugryshev (2) – 10:57		Second period	03:20 – Alexander Yaremchuk (1)
Eduard Gimatov (1; SHG/ENG) – 18:57		Third period	No scoring
Juha Metsola (42 shots / 41 saves)		Goalie stats	Igor Bobkov (16 shots / 13 saves); Emil Garipov (5 shots / 5 saves)

Salavat Yulaev Ufa win 4–2

==== (4) Avtomobilist Yekaterinburg vs. (5) Sibir Novosibirsk ====
Avtomobilist Yekaterinburg finished fourth in the Eastern Conference earning 78 points. Their opponents and Kharlamov Division rivals Sibir Novosibirsk finished as the Eastern Conference's fifth seed, earning 74 points. This was the first playoff meeting between the two teams, and Sibir Novosibirsk made the playoffs for the first time since 2016. Sibir Novosibirsk won three out of the four games to be held between the teams during the 2019–20 season, two of which came in overtime.

2 March	Avtomobilist Yekaterinburg	0–2	Sibir Novosibirsk	KRK Uralets	Recap
No scoring		First period	17:26 – Juuso Puustinen (1)
No scoring		Second period	No scoring
No scoring		Third period	19:05 – Evgeny Chesalin (1; ENG)
Jakub Kovář (19 shots / 18 saves)		Goalie stats	Harri Säteri (37 shots / 37 saves)

4 March	Avtomobilist Yekaterinburg	0–1	OT	Sibir Novosibirsk	KRK Uralets	Recap
No scoring		First period		No scoring
No scoring		Second period		No scoring
No scoring		Third period		No scoring
No scoring		First overtime period		13:01 – Mikael Ruohomaa (1)
Jakub Kovář (32 shots / 31 saves)		Goalie stats		Harri Säteri (48 shots / 48 saves)

6 March	Sibir Novosibirsk	4–3	OT	Avtomobilist Yekaterinburg	Ice Sports Palace Sibir	Recap
Juuso Puustinen (2) – 07:47; Juuso Puustinen (3; EA) – 11:37		First period		09:24 – Maxim Berezin (1; PPG)
No scoring		Second period		08:59 – Peter Holland (1)
Juuso Puustinen (4) – 05:48		Third period		15:46 – Geoff Platt (1; SHG)
Nikita Shashkov (1) – 09:41		First overtime period		No scoring
Harri Säteri (40 shots / 37 saves)		Goalie stats		Jakub Kovář (39 shots / 35 saves)

8 March	Sibir Novosibirsk	1–5	Avtomobilist Yekaterinburg	Ice Sports Palace Sibir	Recap
No scoring		First period	No scoring
Danil Romantsev (1; PPG) – 16:46		Second period	00:57 – Georgi Belousov (1); 06:07 – Pavel Datsyuk (1); 06:45 – Peter Holland (2; PPG)
No scoring		Third period	00:30 – Dan Sexton (1); 15:02 – Maxim Berezin (2)
Harri Säteri (18 shots / 15 saves); Alexei Krasikov (12 shots / 10 saves)		Goalie stats	Jakub Kovář (33 shots / 32 saves)

10 March	Avtomobilist Yekaterinburg	1–2	Sibir Novosibirsk	KRK Uralets	Recap
No scoring		First period	16:22 – Dmitri Sayustov (1; PPG)
No scoring		Second period	04:16 – Evgeny Chesalin (2)
Pavel Datsyuk (2; PPG) – 00:44		Third period	No scoring
Jakub Kovář (16 shots / 14 saves)		Goalie stats	Harri Säteri (37 shots / 36 saves)

Sibir Novosibirsk win 4–1

=== Western Conference first round ===
==== (1) CSKA Moscow vs. (8) Torpedo Nizhny Novgorod ====
CSKA Moscow finished first in the Western Conference earning 94 points, winning their second consecutive Western Conference title. Their opponents and Tarasov Division rivals Torpedo Nizhny Novgorod finished as the Western Conference's eighth seed, earning 64 points. The teams had met once previously in the playoffs with CSKA Moscow winning the second round series, 4–1, in 2016. CSKA Moscow won three out of the four games to be held between the teams during the 2019–20 season, with Torpedo's lone success coming in an overtime game.

2 March	CSKA Moscow	3–0	Torpedo Nizhny Novgorod	CSKA Arena	Recap
Anton Slepyshev (1) – 04:04; Mario Kempe (1) – 07:05		First period	No scoring
Linden Vey (1) – 03:05		Second period	No scoring
No scoring		Third period	No scoring
Ilya Sorokin (16 shots / 16 saves)		Goalie stats	Anders Lindbäck (29 shots / 26 saves)

4 March	CSKA Moscow	3–0	Torpedo Nizhny Novgorod	CSKA Arena	Recap
Pavel Karnaukhov (1) – 07:56; Mikhail Grigorenko (1; PPG) – 14:07		First period	No scoring
No scoring		Second period	No scoring
Kirill Kaprizov (1; ENG) – 19:57		Third period	No scoring
Ilya Sorokin (19 shots / 19 saves)		Goalie stats	Andrei Tikhomirov (24 shots / 22 saves)

6 March	Torpedo Nizhny Novgorod	1–2	OT	CSKA Moscow	Trade Union Sport Palace	Recap
Andrei Belevich (1) – 18:15		First period		08:10 – Maxim Mamin (1)
No scoring		Second period		No scoring
No scoring		Third period		No scoring
No scoring		First overtime period		04:24 – Anton Slepyshev (2)
Andrei Tikhomirov (39 shots / 37 saves)		Goalie stats		Ilya Sorokin (31 shots / 30 saves)

8 March	Torpedo Nizhny Novgorod	2–3	OT	CSKA Moscow	Trade Union Sport Palace	Recap
No scoring		First period		No scoring
Chay Genoway (1) – 18:37		Second period		No scoring
Jordan Schroeder (1; PPG) – 02:12		Third period		06:08 – Mat Robinson (1); 17:15 – Maxim Shalunov (1)
No scoring		First overtime period		02:02 – Kirill Kaprizov (2; PPG)
Andrei Tikhomirov (30 shots / 27 saves)		Goalie stats		Ilya Sorokin (23 shots / 21 saves)

CSKA Moscow win 4–0

==== (2) SKA Saint Petersburg vs. (7) Vityaz Podolsk ====
SKA Saint Petersburg finished second in the Western Conference earning 93 points, winning their fourth consecutive Bobrov Division title. Their opponents Vityaz Podolsk finished as the Western Conference's seventh seed, earning 65 points. The teams had met once previously in the playoffs with SKA Saint Petersburg sweeping the first round series in 2017 – having finished as the number 2 and 7 seeds respectively in the 2016–17 season. In their two meetings during the 2019–20 season, SKA Saint Petersburg recorded an overtime victory and Vityaz Podolsk won the other game 4–2.

1 March	SKA Saint Petersburg	6–1	Vityaz Podolsk	Ice Palace	Recap
Andrei Kuzmenko (1) – 08:32		First period	13:21 – Pavel Chernov (1)
Joonas Kemppainen (1; PPG) – 01:19; Kirill Marchenko (1) – 06:57; Kirill Marchenko (2; PPG) – 10:05; Andrei Kuzmenko (2; PPG) – 10:42		Second period	No scoring
Andrei Kuzmenko (3) – 09:44		Third period	No scoring
Alexander Samonov (18 shots / 17 saves)		Goalie stats	Ilya Ezhov (18 shots / 13 saves); Igor Saprykin (16 shots / 15 saves)

3 March	SKA Saint Petersburg	4–3	Vityaz Podolsk	Ice Palace	Recap
No scoring		First period	12:29 – Quinton Howden (1)
Sergei Plotnikov (1; PPG) – 02:07; Evgeny Ketov (1) – 09:35; Vasily Podkolzin (1) – 11:49; Joonas Kemppainen (2; PPG) – 15:54		Second period	No scoring
No scoring		Third period	10:03 – Quinton Howden (2); 13:35 – Alexei Makeyev (1)
Alexander Samonov (34 shots / 31 saves)		Goalie stats	Ilya Ezhov (19 shots / 16 saves); Igor Saprykin (13 shots / 12 saves)

5 March	Vityaz Podolsk	0–6	SKA Saint Petersburg	Vityaz Ice Palace	Recap
No scoring		First period	09:17 – Danila Galenyuk (1); 09:50 – Ivan Morozov (1); 13:51 – Vladimir Tkachev (1; PPG); 19:55 – Anton Burdasov (1; PPG)
No scoring		Second period	09:06 – Kirill Marchenko (3; PPG)
No scoring		Third period	13:36 – Alexander Barabanov (1)
Ilya Ezhov (26 shots / 22 saves); Igor Saprykin (5 shots / 3 saves)		Goalie stats	Magnus Hellberg (31 shots / 31 saves)

7 March	Vityaz Podolsk	2–3	3OT	SKA Saint Petersburg	Vityaz Ice Palace	Recap
Ville Lajunen (1; PPG) – 18:11		First period		00:48 – Anton Belov (1)
No scoring		Second period		No scoring
Alexei Makeyev (2) – 03:53		Third period		13:12 – Sergei Plotnikov (2)
No scoring		Third overtime period		13:27 – Lukas Bengtsson (1; PPG)
Ilya Ezhov (70 shots / 67 saves)		Goalie stats		Magnus Hellberg (56 shots / 54 saves)

SKA Saint Petersburg win 4–0

==== (3) Jokerit vs. (6) Lokomotiv Yaroslavl ====
Jokerit finished third in the Western Conference earning 84 points. Their opponents Lokomotiv Yaroslavl finished as the Western Conference's sixth seed, earning 73 points. This was the first playoff meeting between the two teams; the teams played each other six times during the 2019–20 season, with Lokomotiv Yaroslavl winning four of the games.

1 March	Jokerit	6–0	Lokomotiv Yaroslavl	Hartwall Arena	Recap
Veli-Matti Savinainen (1; PPG) – 18:39		First period	No scoring
Peter Regin (1) – 00:38; Nicklas Jensen (1) – 10:44; Petri Kontiola (1; PPG) – 14:17; Veli-Matti Savinainen (2; SHG) – 19:18		Second period	No scoring
Mikko Lehtonen (1; PPG) – 13:25		Third period	No scoring
Antti Niemi (17 shots / 17 saves)		Goalie stats	Aleksandr Lazushin (25 shots / 20 saves); Ilya Konovalov (4 shots / 3 saves)

3 March	Jokerit	5–1	Lokomotiv Yaroslavl	Hartwall Arena	Recap
Marko Anttila (1) – 01:57; David Sklenička (1) – 10:28; Sami Lepistö (1; PPG) – 15:28		First period	No scoring
Saku Mäenalanen (1) – 04:23		Second period	06:19 – Magnus Pääjärvi (1; PPG)
Antti Pihlström (1; SHG/ENG) – 19:22		Third period	No scoring
Jānis Kalniņš (17 shots / 16 saves)		Goalie stats	Ilya Konovalov (11 shots / 8 saves); Aleksandr Lazushin (14 shots / 13 saves)

5 March	Lokomotiv Yaroslavl	0–3	Jokerit	Arena 2000	Recap
No scoring		First period	00:57 – Viktor Lööv (1)
No scoring		Second period	No scoring
No scoring		Third period	04:28 – Saku Mäenalanen (2; PPG); 10:36 – Nicklas Jensen (2)
Aleksandr Lazushin (27 shots / 24 saves)		Goalie stats	Jānis Kalniņš (35 shots / 35 saves)

7 March	Lokomotiv Yaroslavl	4–3	Jokerit	Arena 2000	Recap
No scoring		First period	19:48 – Marko Anttila (2)
Nikita Cherepanov (1) – 08:45; Artur Kayumov (1) – 10:22		Second period	No scoring
Egor Averin (1) – 01:34; Stéphane Da Costa (1; PPG) – 15:51		Third period	13:38 – Peter Regin (2); 19:34 – Henrik Haapala (1; EA)
Ilya Konovalov (40 shots / 37 saves)		Goalie stats	Jānis Kalniņš (37 shots / 33 saves)

9 March	Jokerit	2–4	Lokomotiv Yaroslavl	Hartwall Arena	Recap
Antti Pihlström (2) – 15:28; Jesse Joensuu (1) – 17:29		First period	09:09 – Pavel Kudryavtsev (1)
No scoring		Second period	No scoring
No scoring		Third period	02:54 – Grigori Denisenko (1); 06:36 – Stéphane Da Costa (2); 16:32 – Artur Kayumov (2)
Jānis Kalniņš (25 shots / 21 saves)		Goalie stats	Ilya Konovalov (28 shots / 26 saves)

11 March	Lokomotiv Yaroslavl	1–5	Jokerit	Arena 2000	Recap
Stéphane Da Costa (3; PPG) – 03:12		First period	01:27 – Henrik Haapala (2); 18:05 – Veli-Matti Savinainen (3)
No scoring		Second period	No scoring
No scoring		Third period	08:37 – Antti Pihlström (3); 12:44 – Nicklas Jensen (3); 16:52 – Oliver Lauridsen (1; ENG)
Ilya Konovalov (33 shots / 29 saves)		Goalie stats	Jānis Kalniņš (24 shots / 23 saves)

Jokerit win 4–2

==== (4) Dynamo Moscow vs. (5) Spartak Moscow ====
Dynamo Moscow finished fourth in the Western Conference earning 82 points. Their cross-city opponents and Bobrov Division rivals Spartak Moscow finished as the Western Conference's fifth seed, earning 77 points. The teams had met once previously in the playoffs with Spartak Moscow winning their first round series in 2010. Dynamo Moscow won all four games to be held between the teams during the 2019–20 season.

2 March	Dynamo Moscow	5–1	Spartak Moscow	VTB Arena	Recap
Dmitrij Jaškin (1) – 02:44		First period	No scoring
André Petersson (1) – 13:42; André Petersson (2) – 17:40		Second period	No scoring
Michal Čajkovský (1; PPG) – 01:53; Vladimir Bryukvin (1) – 19:02		Third period	16:38 – Anatoli Nikontsev (1)
Alexander Yeryomenko (32 shots / 31 saves)		Goalie stats	Július Hudáček (23 shots / 20 saves); Pavel Khomchenko (11 shots / 9 saves)

4 March	Dynamo Moscow	4–3	Spartak Moscow	VTB Arena	Recap
No scoring		First period	04:52 – Ansel Galimov (1)
Vadim Shipachyov (1; PPG) – 07:46		Second period	No scoring
Vadim Shipachyov (2; PPG) – 16:35; André Petersson (3) – 18:52; Mikhail Grigoryev (1; ENG) – 19:23		Third period	00:56 – Patrik Hersley (1); 19:54 – Robin Hanzl (1; EA/PPG)
Alexander Yeryomenko (29 shots / 26 saves)		Goalie stats	Július Hudáček (32 shots / 29 saves)

6 March	Spartak Moscow	5–4	OT	Dynamo Moscow	CSKA Arena	Recap
Ilya Zubov (1) – 06:28; Artyom Fyodorov (1) – 19:54		First period		00:53 – Igor Polygalov (1); 03:12 – Kirill Lyamin (1; PPG); 04:34 – Ivan Muranov (1)
Alexander Khokhlachev (1) – 13:14		Second period		14:39 – Michal Čajkovský (2)
Patrik Hersley (2; PPG) – 17:16		Third period		No scoring
Mikhail Kotlyarevsky (1) – 15:27		First overtime period		No scoring
Július Hudáček (4 shots / 2 saves); Nikita Bespalov (36 shots / 34 saves)		Goalie stats		Ivan Bocharov (49 shots / 44 saves)

8 March	Spartak Moscow	3–2	Dynamo Moscow	CSKA Arena	Recap
Artyom Fyodorov (2; PPG) – 10:33; Ilya Zubov (2) – 12:20		First period	No scoring
Kaspars Daugaviņš (1; PPG) – 14:23		Second period	No scoring
No scoring		Third period	03:03 – Vadim Shipachyov (3; PPG); 19:41 – André Petersson (4; EA)
Nikita Bespalov (38 shots / 36 saves)		Goalie stats	Alexander Yeryomenko (25 shots / 22 saves)

10 March	Dynamo Moscow	4–1	Spartak Moscow	VTB Arena	Recap
No scoring		First period	No scoring
Vadim Shipachyov (4) – 18:00		Second period	No scoring
Maxim Afinogenov (2) – 07:38; Igor Polygalov (2; SHG/ENG) – 17:47; Dmitrij Jaškin (2; ENG) – 19:21		Third period	17:03 – Patrik Hersley (3; EA/PPG)
Alexander Yeryomenko (36 shots / 35 saves)		Goalie stats	Nikita Bespalov (28 shots / 26 saves)

12 March	Spartak Moscow	2–3	OT	Dynamo Moscow	CSKA Arena	Recap
No scoring		First period		06:05 – Vladimir Bryukvin (2)
Robin Hanzl (2) – 13:40; Alexander Khokhlachev (2) – 19:16		Second period		No scoring
No scoring		Third period		06:46 – André Petersson (5; PPG)
No scoring		First overtime period		03:16 – Dmitrij Jaškin (3)
Július Hudáček (31 shots / 28 saves)		Goalie stats		Alexander Yeryomenko (34 shots / 32 saves)

Dynamo Moscow win 4–2

== Player statistics ==
=== Scoring leaders ===
The following players led the league in points, at the cancellation of the season on 25 March 2020. If two or more skaters are tied (i.e. same number of points, goals and played games), all of the tied skaters are shown.

Player	Team	GP	G	A	Pts	+/–	PIM
(Sweden) Linus Omark	Salavat Yulaev Ufa	6	1	11	12	+7	0
(Russia) Vadim Shipachyov	Dynamo Moscow	6	4	4	8	+8	20
(Denmark) Nicklas Jensen	Jokerit	6	3	4	7	+5	2
(Russia) Sergei Shumakov	Avangard Omsk	6	3	4	7	+4	4
(Finland) Teemu Hartikainen	Salavat Yulaev Ufa	6	5	1	6	+5	0
(Sweden) André Petersson	Dynamo Moscow	6	5	1	6	+8	4
(Finland) Sakari Manninen	Salavat Yulaev Ufa	6	4	2	6	+6	6
(Russia) Kirill Semyonov	Avangard Omsk	6	4	2	6	+5	4
(Czech Republic) Dmitrij Jaškin	Dynamo Moscow	6	3	3	6	+6	6
(Russia) Vladimir Tkachev	SKA Saint Petersburg	4	1	5	6	+1	2

=== Leading goaltenders ===
The following goaltenders led the league in goals against average, at the cancellation of the season on 25 March 2020.

Player	Team	GP	TOI	W	L	GA	SO	SV%	GAA
(Sweden) Magnus Hellberg	SKA Saint Petersburg	2	173:27	2	0	2	1	97.70%	0.69
(Russia) Timur Bilyalov	Ak Bars Kazan	4	251:59	4	0	3	1	97.50%	0.71
(Russia) Ilya Sorokin	CSKA Moscow	4	246:04	4	0	3	2	96.63%	0.73
(Canada) Edward Pasquale	Barys Nur-Sultan	5	280:31	4	1	6	2	96.03%	1.28
(Finland) Harri Säteri	Sibir Novosibirsk	5	289:18	4	1	7	2	96.11%	1.45
