= Evgeny Ketov =

Russian ice hockey player (born 1986)

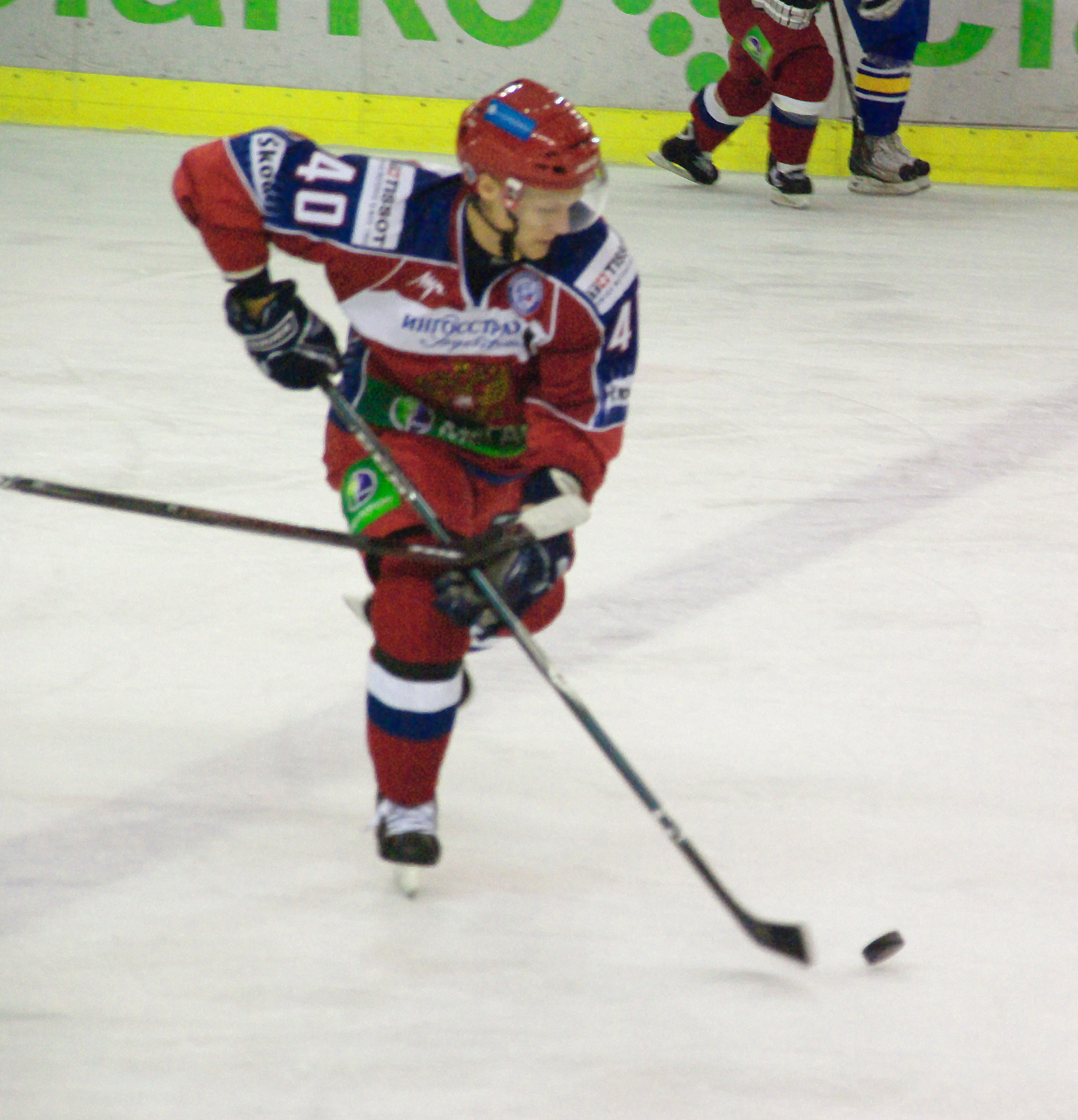
- Born: 17 January 1986 (age 40) Gubakha, Perm Oblast, Russian SFSR, Soviet Union
- Height: 6 ft 0 in (183 cm)
- Weight: 185 lb (84 kg; 13 st 3 lb)
- Position: Right wing
- Shot: Left
- Played for: HC CSK VVS Samara; Lada Togliatti; Ak Bars Kazan; Severstal Cherepovets; SKA Saint Petersburg
- Current VHL coach: SKA-VMF
- National team: Russia
- Playing career: 2001–2023

Evgeny Ketov (Russian: Евгений Кетов; born 17 January 1986) is a Russian professional ice hockey coach and former player, currently the head coach of SKA-VMF in the All-Russian Hockey League (VHL). He played extensively in the Kontinental Hockey League (KHL). He holds SKA Saint Petersburg's team record for games played, and had his number 40 retired by SKA.

== Playing career ==
Ketov was born in Gubakha, a town in the Perm Oblast. He started his career in Molot Perm's academy, then played for farm clubs of Avangard Omsk and Lada Togliatti. In 2005, at the age of 19, Ketov debuted for Lada's main team in the Russian Superleague and quickly became one of the team's scoring leaders. In 2006 he won the IIHF Continental Cup with Lada and was recognized as the best forward of the tournament.

Ketov played for Lada during the inaugural 2008–09 KHL season, playing his first KHL game on 3 September 2009. In the summer of 2009, Ketov joined Ak Bars Kazan. In Ak Bars his scoring declined, however, and in January 2010 he was traded to Severstal Cherepovets in exchange for Nikolai Lemtyugov.

In Cherepovets, Ketov's results rebounded, and in 2011 he became Severstal's captain. In the 2013 Gagarin Cup playoffs, Severstal reached the second round of the playoffs for the first time by defeating Lokomotiv Yaroslavl, but lost the next series to SKA Saint Petersburg.

On 23 May 2013, Ketov, along with Vadim Shipachev, was traded to SKA Saint Petersburg in exchange for Ivan Kasutin, Gleb Klimenko, Sergei Monakhov, Grigori Serkin, a first-round pick in the 2013 KHL Junior Draft and a monetary compensation. After the trade to SKA, Ketov had to transition from being one of the team's leaders into a defensive role with heavy emphasis on blocking shots and the penalty kill. In this new role, Ketov contributed to SKA winning the 2015 and 2017 Gagarin Cups.

In the 2017–18 KHL season, Ketov became SKA's captain. On 13 January 2022, Ketov played his 507th game with SKA, a 2-1 victory over HC Sochi that guaranteed SKA a playoff spot, and beat a 46-year-old club record set by Igor Schyurkov. In total, Ketov played 541 games for SKA.

Following his tenth season with SKA Saint Petersburg in 2022–23, Ketov announced his retirement after 22 professional seasons on 25 April 2023. On 11 December 2023, SKA retired Ketov's number 40 and raised his banner in the St. Petersburg Ice Palace.

=== National team ===
Ketov was a member of Russia's team at 2006 World Junior Ice Hockey Championships, which took silver medals. Ketov was first called to Russia's second team for the 2010 Euro Ice Hockey Challenge.

In the 2011–12 season, he played at another Euro Ice Hockey Challenge, then was for the first time called to play for Russia's main national team team at the 2012 Czech Hockey Games and the 2012 IIHF World Championship. At the World Championship, while Ketov played on the fourth line and scored no points in the group stage and was scratched for the playoffs, Russia won the tournament and became the World Champions. For his role in the team's victory, Ketov was awarded the title of Honored Master of Sports of Russia.

For the 2018 Karjala Cup, Ketov became the captain of Russia's national team. He was also the captain for the Channel One Cup in 2018 and 2019.

== Coaching career ==
After his retirement as a player, Ketov joined SKA's coaching staff as Roman Rotenberg's assistant. He stayed an assistant coach after Rotenberg was replaced with Igor Larionov. On 11 October 2025, he was appointed to become the head coach of SKA-VMF, SKA's farm club in the second-tier All-Russian Hockey League.

== Personal life ==
Evgeny first met his wife, Valeria Ketova, when he was playing for Lada. They have three sons: Nikolay, Platon and Vladimir.

== Career statistics ==
=== KHL ===
			Regular season					Playoffs
Season	Team	League	GP	G	A	Pts	PIM	GP	G	A	Pts	PIM
2008–09	Lada Togliatti	KHL	39	14	10	24	26	2	2	0	2	2
2009–10	Ak Bars Kazan	KHL	33	0	2	2	10	—	—	—	—	—
2009–10	Severstal Cherepovets	KHL	13	3	4	7	10	—	—	—	—	—
2010–11	Severstal Cherepovets	KHL	43	15	10	25	18	6	2	1	3	18
2011–12	Severstal Cherepovets	KHL	45	13	12	25	20	6	0	1	1	2
2012–13	Severstal Cherepovets	KHL	48	12	22	34	69	10	4	3	7	2
2013–14	SKA Saint Petersburg	KHL	39	8	8	16	18	4	0	0	0	5
2014–15	SKA Saint Petersburg	KHL	49	5	4	9	28	13	1	2	3	12
2015–16	SKA Saint Petersburg	KHL	55	8	6	14	76	15	0	0	0	20
2016–17	SKA Saint Petersburg	KHL	47	9	5	14	39	18	6	1	7	30
2017–18	SKA Saint Petersburg	KHL	47	7	7	14	26	13	0	1	1	6
2018–19	SKA Saint Petersburg	KHL	46	1	6	7	18	9	0	0	0	6
2019–20	SKA Saint Petersburg	KHL	59	13	8	21	30	4	1	1	2	8
2020–21	SKA Saint Petersburg	KHL	49	5	6	11	50	9	2	3	5	6
2021–22	SKA Saint Petersburg	KHL	31	1	1	2	8	9	0	0	0	2
2022–23	SKA Saint Petersburg	KHL	18	4	2	6	2	7	1	0	1	4
KHL totals			661	118	113	231	448	125	19	13	32	123

=== International ===
Year	Team	Event	Result	GP	G	A	Pts	PIM
2006	Russia	WJC	2nd place, silver medalist(s)	6	0	1	1	2
2012	Russia	WC	1st place, gold medalist(s)	7	0	0	0	0
Junior totals				6	0	1	1	2
Senior totals				7	0	0	0	0

== Awards and honors ==
Award	Year
IIHF Continental Cup (Lada Togliatti)	2006
KHL
Gagarin Cup (SKA Saint Petersburg)	2015, 2017
Kontinental Cup (SKA Saint Petersburg)	2018, 2023
