= Leshchenko =

Leshchenko (Ukrainian: Лещенко, Russian: Лещенко) is a surname of Ukrainian origin.

This surname is shared by the following people:

- Dmitry Leshchenko (1876–1937), Russian revolutionary and organizer of Soviet cinema
- Lev Leshchenko (born 1942), Russian singer
- Pyotr Leshchenko (1898–1954), singer in the Russian Empire and later the Soviet Union, "the King of Russian Tango"
- Serhiy Leshchenko (born 1980), Ukrainian journalist and public figure
- Vyacheslav Leshchenko (born 1995), Russian professional ice hockey right winger
