= Saprykin =

Saprykin (masculine, Russian: Сапрыкин) or Saprykina (feminine, Russian: Сапрыкина) is a Russian surname. Notable people with the surname include:

- Aleksandr Saprykin (1946–2021), Soviet volleyball player
- Igor Saprykin (born 1992), Russian ice hockey player
- Oksana Saprykina (born 1979), Ukrainian road cyclist
- Oleg Saprykin (born 1981), Russian ice hockey player
- Yevgeni Saprykin (born 1970), Russian soccer player
