= Bespalov =

Bespalov (masculine, Russian: Беспалов) or Bespalova (feminine, Russian: Беспалова) is a Russian surname. Notable people with the surname include:

- Anastasiya Bespalova, Russian composer
- Irina Bespalova (born 1981), Russian swimmer
- Mariya Bespalova (born 1986), Russian hammer thrower
- Nikita Bespalov (born 1987), Russian ice hockey player
- Valery Alekseyevich Bespalov (born 1957), Engineer and Chernobyl liquidator
