= 2017 Gagarin Cup playoffs =

Tournament details
- Dates: February 22–April 16, 2017
- Teams: 16

Final positions
- Champions: SKA Saint Petersburg
- Runner-up: Metallurg Magnitogorsk

Tournament statistics
- Scoring leader(s): Jan Kovář (25 points)

The 2017 Gagarin Cup playoffs of the Kontinental Hockey League (KHL) began on February 22, 2017, with the top eight teams from each of the conferences, following the conclusion of the 2016–17 KHL regular season.

== Playoff seeds ==
After the regular season, the standard 16 teams qualified for the playoffs. The Western Conference regular season winners and Continental Cup winners are CSKA Moscow with 137 points. Metallurg Magnitogorsk are the Eastern Conference regular season winners with 124 points.

== Draw ==
The playoffs started on February 22, 2017, with the top eight teams from each of the conferences and ended with the last game of the Gagarin Cup final on April 16, 2017.

Conference Quarterfinals	Conference Semifinals
1	(Russia) Metallurg Mg	4
8	(China) Kunlun Red Star	1
1	(Russia) Metallurg Mg	4
5	(Kazakhstan) Barys	0
2	(Russia) Avangard	4
7	(Russia) Admiral	2
Eastern Conference
3	(Russia) Ak Bars	4
6	(Russia) Salavat Yulaev	1
2	(Russia) Avangard	2
3	(Russia) Ak Bars	4
4	(Russia) Traktor	2
5	(Kazakhstan) Barys	4
1	(Russia) CSKA	4
8	(Finland) Jokerit	0
1	(Russia) CSKA	2
4	(Russia) Lokomotiv	4
2	(Russia) SKA	4
7	(Russia) Vityaz	0
Western Conference
3	(Russia) Dynamo Msk	4
6	(Russia) Torpedo	1
2	(Russia) SKA	4
3	(Russia) Dynamo Msk	1
4	(Russia) Lokomotiv	4
5	(Belarus) Dinamo Mn	1

Conference Finals
1	(Russia) Metallurg Mg	4
3	(Russia) Ak Bars	0
4	(Russia) Lokomotiv	0
2	(Russia) SKA	4

Gagarin Cup Finals
E1	(Russia) Metallurg Mg	1
W2	(Russia) SKA	4

== Player statistics ==
=== Scoring leaders ===
As of 16 Apr 2017

Player	Team	GP	G	A	Pts	+/–	PIM
Jan Kovář	Metallurg Magnitogorsk	18	10	15	25	+11	22
Sergei Mozyakin	Metallurg Magnitogorsk	17	7	17	24	+8	6
Nikita Gusev	SKA Saint Petersburg	18	7	16	23	+2	2
Danis Zaripov	Metallurg Magnitogorsk	18	15	7	22	+12	18
Chris Lee	Metallurg Magnitogorsk	18	1	20	21	+16	22
Vadim Shipachyov	SKA Saint Petersburg	17	4	16	20	+6	8
Evgenii Dadonov	SKA Saint Petersburg	18	9	10	19	+6	2
Patrik Hersley	SKA Saint Petersburg	16	6	12	18	+13	6
Anton Belov	SKA Saint Petersburg	18	3	11	14	+4	10
Brandon Kozun	Lokomotiv Yaroslavl	14	2	12	14	–2	4

Source: KHL

==== Leading goaltenders ====
As of 16 Apr 2017

Player	Team	GP	Min	W	L	GA	SO	SV%	GAA
Mikko Koskinen	SKA Saint Petersburg	15	912	12	1	25	1	.938	1.64
Mikhail Biryukov	Torpedo Nizhny Novgorod	3	213	0	3	6	0	.948	1.69
Niklas Svedberg	Salavat Yulaev Ufa	5	272	1	4	8	0	.933	1.76
Emil Garipov	Ak Bars Kazan	15	941	8	7	29	2	.933	1.85
Dominik Furch	Avangard Omsk	12	752	6	6	24	1	.922	1.91

Source: KHL
