= 2012 Oddset Hockey Games =

Tournament details
- Host countries: Sweden; Finland
- Cities: Stockholm; Helsinki
- Venues: 2 (in 2 host cities)
- Dates: 9–12 February 2012
- Teams: 4

Final positions
- Champions: Sweden (12th title)
- Runners-up: Czech Republic
- Third place: Russia
- Fourth place: Finland

Tournament statistics
- Games played: 6
- Goals scored: 25 (4.17 per game)
- Attendance: 55,398 (9,233 per game)
- Scoring leader: (Finland) Janne Pesonen (3 points)

The 2012 Oddset Hockey Games was played between 9 and 12 February 2012. The Czech Republic, Finland, Sweden and Russia played a round-robin for a total of three games per team and six games in total. Five of the matches were played in the Ericsson Globe in Stockholm, Sweden, and one match in the Helsinki Olympic Stadium in Helsinki, Finland. Sweden won the tournament for the second year in a row, after defeating Finland 3–1 on the last game day. The tournament was part of 2011–12 Euro Hockey Tour.

Prior to this year, Sweden Hockey Games was named LG Hockey Games because the tournament was sponsored by LG Electronics. However, after LG decided to drop out their sponsoring, Oddset, a gambling game by Svenska Spel, took over and effectively renamed the tournament to Oddset Hockey Games.

== Standings ==
Pos	Team	Pld	W	OTW	OTL	L	GF	GA	GD	Pts
1	Sweden	3	2	0	1	0	8	4	+4	7
2	Czech Republic	3	1	1	0	1	6	8	−2	5
3	Russia	3	1	0	0	2	3	8	−5	3
4	Finland	3	1	0	0	2	8	5	+3	3

Source: eurohockey

== Games ==
All times are local. Stockholm – (Central European Time – UTC+1) Helsinki – (Eastern European Time – UTC+2)

9 February 2012; 18:30	Finland	0–2 (0–1, 0–0, 0–1)	Russia	Helsinki Olympic Stadium, Helsinki; Attendance: 25,036

Game reference
Ari Ahonen	Goalies	Mikhail Biryukov	Referees: (Czech Republic) Martin Frano (Czech Republic) Antonin Jerabek
0–1 / 19:17 – S. Chistov (E. Kuznetsov, N. Zherdev); 0–2 / 46:32 – (PP1) E. Kuznetsov (I. Nikulin)			Referees: (Czech Republic) Martin Frano (Czech Republic) Antonin Jerabek
8 min	Penalties	10 min	Referees: (Czech Republic) Martin Frano (Czech Republic) Antonin Jerabek
21	Shots	14	Referees: (Czech Republic) Martin Frano (Czech Republic) Antonin Jerabek

9 February 2012; 19:00	Czech Republic	2–1 GWS (0–0, 0–1, 1–0) (OT: 0–0) (SO: 1–0)	Sweden	Ericsson Globe, Stockholm; Attendance: 7,125

Game reference
Tomas Pöpperle	Goalies	Johan Gustafsson	Referees: (Finland) Jari Leppäalho (Finland) Jari Levonen
J. Kolář (J. Nakládal) (PP1) – 51:04 / 1–0; / 1–1 / 23:01 – N. Danielsson (C. Söderberg)			Referees: (Finland) Jari Leppäalho (Finland) Jari Levonen
P. Nedvěd (miss); Z. Irgl (miss); J. Klepiš (miss); P. Nedvěd	Shootout	(miss) C. Söderberg; (miss) M. Weinhandl; (miss) J. Silfverberg; (miss) C. Järnkrok	Referees: (Finland) Jari Leppäalho (Finland) Jari Levonen
10 min	Penalties	12 min	Referees: (Finland) Jari Leppäalho (Finland) Jari Levonen
23	Shots	39	Referees: (Finland) Jari Leppäalho (Finland) Jari Levonen

11 February 2012; 12:00	Finland	7–0 (3–0, 2–0, 2–0)	Czech Republic	Ericsson Globe, Stockholm; Attendance: 3,755

Game reference

Niko Hovinen
Goalies
Jakub Kovář
Referees:
(Sweden) Mikael Nord
(Sweden) Mikael Sjöqvist

L. Komarov (N. Hovinen) (SH1) – 09:55	1–0
J. Pesonen (J. Aaltonen, P. Lindgren) – 12:38	2–0
J. Aaltonen (O. Väänänen) – 19:01	3–0
J. Lahti (J. Niskala, S. Salminen) – 31:19	4–0
P. Kontiola (J. Lahti, S. Salminen) – 39:21	5–0
J. Niskala (P. Kontiola) – 40:12	6–0
J. Pesonen (O. Väänänen, J. Aaltonen) – 40:30	7–0

10 min
Penalties
10 min
34
Shots
18

11 February 2012; 16:30	Sweden	4–1 (0–0, 1–0, 3–1)	Russia	Ericsson Globe, Stockholm; Attendance: 9,062

Game reference

Viktor Fasth
Goalies
Ilya Yezhov
Referees:
(Finland) Jari Leppäalho
(Finland) Jari Levonen

M. Ekholm (M. Weinhandl) (PP1) – 38:46	1–0
N. Danielsson (A. Jämtin, C. Söderberg) (PP1) – 41:38	2–0
	2–1	45:04 – (PP1) A. Ryazantsev (E. Biryukov, V. Tarasenko)
J. Silfverberg (T. Mårtensson) – 55:36	3–1
T. Mårtensson (M. Weinhandl, M. Johansson) (PP1) – 56:33	4–1

12 min
Penalties
18 min
40
Shots
24

12 February 2012; 12:00	Russia	0–4 (0–2, 0–1, 0–1)	Czech Republic	Ericsson Globe, Stockholm; Attendance: 1,157

Game reference

Mikhail Biryukov
Goalies
Jakub Kovář
Referees:
(Sweden) Patrik Sjöberg
(Sweden) Morgan Johansson

0–1	02:02 – J. Nakládal (P. Koukal)
0–2	15:08 – (PP1) P. Nedvěd (Z. Irgl)
0–3	33:06 – (PP1) K. Kreps (L. Kašpar)
0–4	55:03 – (PP1) P. Koukal (J. Nakládal, J. Kolář)

10 min
Penalties
6 min
19
Shots
29

12 February 2012; 16:30	Sweden	3–1 (0–0, 1–0, 2–1)	Finland	Ericsson Globe, Stockholm; Attendance: 9,263

Game reference

Viktor Fasth
Goalies
Joni Ortio
Referees:
(Russia) Vyacheslav Bulanov
(Russia) Konstantin Olenin

S. Kronwall (J. Silfverberg) (PP1) – 35:59	1–0
J. Andersson (N. Danielsson) – 45:52	2–0
	2–1	46:34 – (SH1) J. Pesonen
J. Lundqvist – 58:11	3–1

8 min
Penalties
12 min
36
Shots
28

== Scoring leaders ==
Pos	Player	Country	GP	G	A	Pts	+/−	PIM	POS
1	Janne Pesonen	Finland	3	3	0	3	+4	0	RW
2	Nicklas Danielsson	Sweden	3	2	1	3	+2	8	RW
3	Juhamatti Aaltonen	Finland	1	1	2	3	+1	2	RW
4	Jakub Nakládal	Czech Republic	3	1	2	3	+0	0	LD
5	Petr Nedvěd	Czech Republic	3	2	0	2	+3	2	CE

GP = Games played; G = Goals; A = Assists; Pts = Points; +/− = Plus/minus; PIM = Penalties in minutes; POS = Position
Source: swehockey

== Goaltending leaders ==
Pos	Player	Country	TOI	GA	GAA	Sv%	SO
1	Viktor Fasth	Sweden	120:00	2	1.00	96.15	0
2	Mikhail Biryukov	Russia	120:00	4	2.00	92.00	1
3	Tomáš Pöpperle	Czech Republic	133:48	5	2.98	91.38	0
4	Jakub Kovář	Czech Republic	124:46	3	1.13	91.18	1

TOI = Time on ice (minutes:seconds); SA = Shots against; GA = Goals against; GAA = Goals Against Average; Sv% = Save percentage; SO = Shutouts
Source: swehockey

== Tournament awards ==
The tournament directorate named the following players in the tournament 2012:

- Best goalkeeper: (Sweden) Viktor Fasth
- Best defenceman: (Sweden) Mattias Ekholm
- Best forward: (Finland) Juhamatti Aaltonen

Media All-Star Team:

- Goaltender: (Sweden) Viktor Fasth
- Defence: (Finland) Ossi Väänänen, (Finland) Mattias Ekholm
- Forwards: (Finland) Juhamatti Aaltonen, (Russia) Evgeny Kuznetsov, (Sweden) Nicklas Danielsson
