= Valentin Pyanov =

Russian ice hockey player

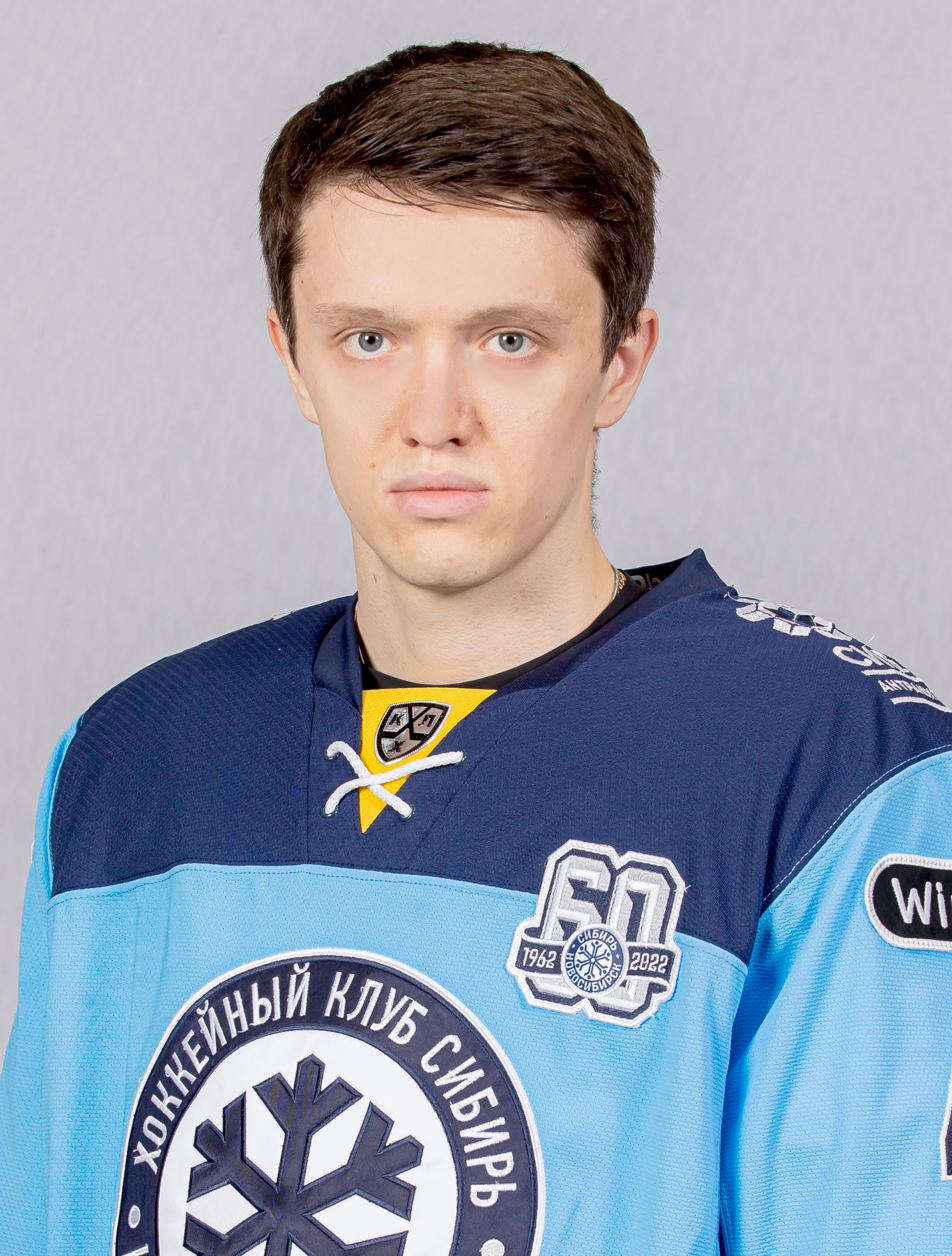
- Born: July 21, 1991 (age 34) Omsk, Russia
- Height: 6 ft 1 in (185 cm)
- Weight: 168 lb (76 kg; 12 st 0 lb)
- Position: Forward
- Shoots: Left
- KHL team Former teams: Sibir Novosibirsk; Avangard Omsk; HC Pardubice; HC Lada Togliatti; Saryarka Karagandy; Amur Khabarovsk
- Playing career: 2012–present

Valentin Pyanov (born July 21, 1991) is a Russian professional ice hockey player. He is currently under contract with HC Sibir Novosibirsk of the Kontinental Hockey League (KHL).

Pyanov made his KHL debut playing with Avangard Omsk during the 2012–13 season.
