= Pavel Kudryavtsev =

Russian ice hockey player (born 1997)

- Born: 5 September 1997 (age 29) Yaroslavl, Russia
- Height: 6 ft 0 in (183 cm)
- Weight: 190 lb (86 kg; 13 st 8 lb)
- Position: Left Wing
- Shoots: Right
- KHL team Former teams: Lada Togliatti; Lokomotiv Yaroslavl; Dynamo Moscow
- Playing career: 2016–present

Pavel Kudryavtsev (born 5 September 1997) is a Russian professional ice hockey player who is currently playing for HC Lada Togliatti in the Kontinental Hockey League (KHL)

Kudryavtsev originally made his KHL debut with Lokomotiv Yaroslavl in the 2016–17 season. After parts of five seasons in the KHL with hometown club, Lokomotiv, Kudryavtsev left to sign a two-year contract with HC Dynamo Moscow of the KHL on 2 May 2022.

After four seasons with Dynamo, Kudryavtsev continued his tenure in the KHL with Lada Togliatti, agreeing to a one-year contract on 4 June 2026.
