= 2013 Gagarin Cup playoffs =

Tournament details
- Dates: February 20–April 17, 2013
- Teams: 16

Final positions
- Champions: Dynamo Moscow
- Runner-up: Traktor Chelyabinsk

The 2013 Gagarin Cup playoffs of the Kontinental Hockey League (KHL) has begun on February 20, 2013, after the conclusion of the 2012–13 KHL regular season. The 2013 Gagarin Cup Finals started in April.

== Playoff seeds ==
After the regular season, the standard 16 teams qualified for the playoffs. The SKA Saint Petersburg became the Western Conference regular season champions and Continental Cup winners with 115 points. The Ak Bars Kazan were the Eastern Conference regular season champions, finishing the season with 104 points. Lev Prague and Slovan Bratislava both made the playoffs for the first time in franchise history.

=== Western Conference ===
1. SKA Saint Petersburg – Bobrov Division and Western Conference regular season champions, Continental Cup winners – 115 points
2. CSKA Moscow – Tarasov Division champions – 96 points
3. Dynamo Moscow – 101 points
4. Lokomotiv Yaroslavl – 92 points
5. Severstal Cherepovets – 85 points
6. Slovan Bratislava – 78 points
7. Lev Prague – 76 points
8. Atlant Moscow Oblast – 73 points

=== Eastern Conference ===
1. Ak Bars Kazan – Kharlamov Division and Eastern Conference regular season champions – 104 points
2. Avangard Omsk – Chernyshev Division champions – 102 points
3. Traktor Chelyabinsk – 98 points
4. Metallurg Magnitogorsk – 93 points
5. Salavat Yulaev Ufa – 88 points
6. Barys Astana – 85 points
7. Sibir Novosibirsk – 84 points
8. Neftekhimik Nizhnekamsk – 77 points

== Draw ==
In each round, the highest remaining seed in each conference is matched against the lowest remaining seed. The higher-seeded team is awarded home ice advantage. In the Gagarin Cup Final series, home ice is determined based on regular season points. Each best-of-seven series follows a 2–2–1–1–1 format: the higher-seeded team plays at home for games one and two (plus five and seven if necessary), and the lower-seeded team is at home for games three and four (and if necessary, game six).

During the first three rounds home ice is determined by seeding number within the Conference, not position on the bracket. In the Finals the team with better seeding number has home ice advantage. If the seeding numbers are equal, the regular season record is taken into account.

Conference Quarterfinals | Conference Semifinals
1 | (Russia) Ak Bars | 4
8 | (Russia) Neftekhimik | 0
1 | (Russia) Ak Bars | 4
5 | (Russia) Salavat Yulaev | 3
2 | (Russia) Avangard | 4
7 | (Russia) Sibir | 3
Eastern Conference
3 | (Russia) Traktor | 4
6 | (Kazakhstan) Barys | 3
2 | (Russia) Avangard | 1
3 | (Russia) Traktor | 4
4 | (Russia) Metallurg Mg | 3
5 | (Russia) Salavat Yulaev | 4
1 | (Russia) SKA | 4
8 | (Russia) Atlant | 1
1 | (Russia) SKA | 4
5 | (Russia) Severstal | 0
2 | (Russia) CSKA | 4
7 | (Czech Republic) Lev | 0
Western Conference
3 | (Russia) Dynamo Msk | 4
6 | (Slovakia) Slovan | 0
2 | (Russia) CSKA | 1
3 | (Russia) Dynamo Msk | 4
4 | (Russia) Lokomotiv | 2
5 | (Russia) Severstal | 4

Conference Finals
1 | (Russia) Ak Bars | 3
3 | (Russia) Traktor | 4
1 | (Russia) SKA | 2
3 | (Russia) Dynamo Msk | 4

Gagarin Cup Finals
3 | (Russia) Traktor | 2
3 | (Russia) Dynamo Msk | 4

=== Player statistics ===
==== Playoff scoring leaders ====
Updated on 17 April 2013. Source: khl.ru

GP = Games played; G = Goals; A = Assists; Pts = Points; +/– = Plus–minus; PIM = Penalty minutes

| Player | Team | GP | G | A | Pts | +/– | PIM |
|---|---|---|---|---|---|---|---|
| Viktor Tikhonov | SKA Saint Petersburg | 15 | 10 | 9 | 19 | +11 | 20 |
| Petri Kontiola | Traktor Chelyabinsk | 25 | 10 | 9 | 19 | +10 | 12 |
| Jakub Petružálek | Dynamo Moscow | 19 | 9 | 7 | 16 | +4 | 4 |
| Tony Mårtensson | SKA Saint Petersburg | 15 | 6 | 10 | 16 | +8 | 8 |
| Aleksey Morozov | Ak Bars Kazan | 18 | 6 | 9 | 15 | +2 | 4 |

==== Playoff leading goaltenders ====
Updated on 17 April 2013. Source: khl.ru

GP = Games played; Min = Minutes played; W = Wins; L = Losses; SOL = Shootout losses; GA = Goals against; SO = Shutouts; SV% = Save percentage; GAA = Goals against average

| Player | Team | GP | Min | W | L | SOP | GA | SO | SV% | GAA |
|---|---|---|---|---|---|---|---|---|---|---|
| Alexander Eremenko | Dynamo Moscow | 21 | 1309:24 | 16 | 5 | 0 | 38 | 3 | 93.4 | 1.74 |
| Rastislav Staňa | CSKA Moscow | 9 | 551:12 | 5 | 4 | 0 | 16 | 0 | 93.9 | 1.74 |
| Konstantin Barulin | Ak Bars Kazan | 18 | 1233:41 | 11 | 7 | 0 | 36 | 2 | 94.1 | 1.75 |
| Ilya Ezhov | SKA Saint Petersburg | 11 | 645:27 | 6 | 4 | 0 | 19 | 2 | 93.3 | 1.77 |
| Jeff Glass | Sibir Novosibirsk | 7 | 406:47 | 3 | 4 | 0 | 12 | 2 | 94.1 | 1.77 |
