= Aleksandr Lazushin =

Russian ice hockey player

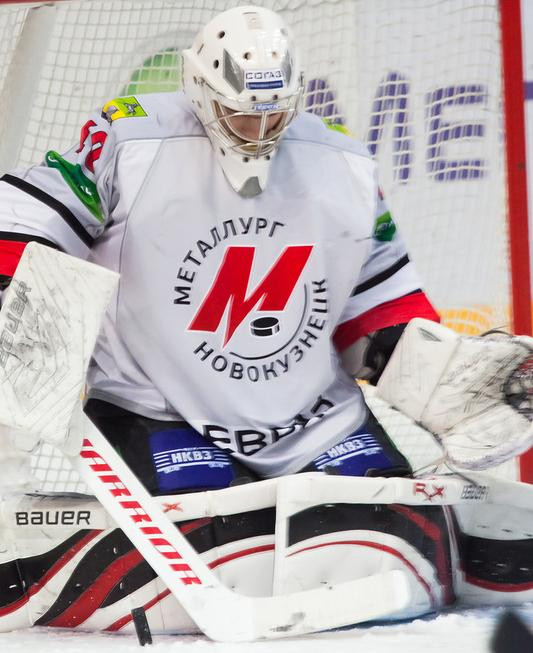
- Alexander Lazushin
- Born: April 9, 1988 (age 38) Yaroslavl, Russian SFSR, Soviet Union
- Height: 6 ft 0 in (183 cm)
- Weight: 216 lb (98 kg; 15 st 6 lb)
- Position: Goaltender
- Caught: Left
- Played for: Admiral Vladivostok; Lokomotiv Yaroslavl; Metallurg Novokuznetsk; Yermak Angarsk; Dynamo Moscow; Dynamo Balashikha; Kunlun Red Star; Lada Togliatti; Dinamo Riga; HC 07 Detva
- Current NMHL coach: HC Polyot
- Playing career: 2005–2025

Aleksandr Valeryevich Lazushin (Russian: Александр Валерьевич Лазушин; born 9 April 1988) is a Russian professional ice hockey coach and former goaltender. He is currently the goaltending coach of the junior hockey club HC Polyot in the National Junior Hockey League (NMHL).

== Playing career ==
Lazushin made his KHL debut in the 2010–11 season with Lokomotiv Yaroslavl, then was traded to Metallurg Novokuznetsk.

On 31 January 2013, he was traded to HC Dynamo Moscow. In 2015, he was named the best goaltender of the KHL's 2014-15 regular season. He stayed with Dynamo until 2017, when he signed with HC Lada Togliatti.

After a year in Togliatti, Lazushin signed with Kunlun Red Star as a free agent in the 2018 offseason. In 2019, he returned to Lokomotiv Yaroslavl.

On 2 August 2020, while still having a year to run on his contract with Lokomotiv, Lazushin left the team in order to return to Kunlun Red Star. In the following season, he also had short stints with HC Dynamo Riga and the Slovak HC 07 Detva.

On 27 December 2021, Lazushin left Kunlun to join Admiral Vladivostok.

On 18 August 2023, Lazushin returned once again to Kunlun Red Star for another stint with the team.

On 20 August 2024 Lazushin joined HC Tambov in the second-tier All-Russian Hockey League.

In the 2024-25 season the veteran goaltender joined Ak Bars Kazan to participate in the experimental KHL 3x3 league, and was named the best goalie of the league while the team placed second, losing to HC Salavat Yulaev in the final.

== Coaching career ==
In 2026, Lazushin joined HC Polyot from Rybinsk, playing in the National Junior Hockey League (NMHL), Russia's second-tier junior hockey league, as a goaltending coach.
