= Ilya Ezhov =

Russian ice hockey coach and former goaltender

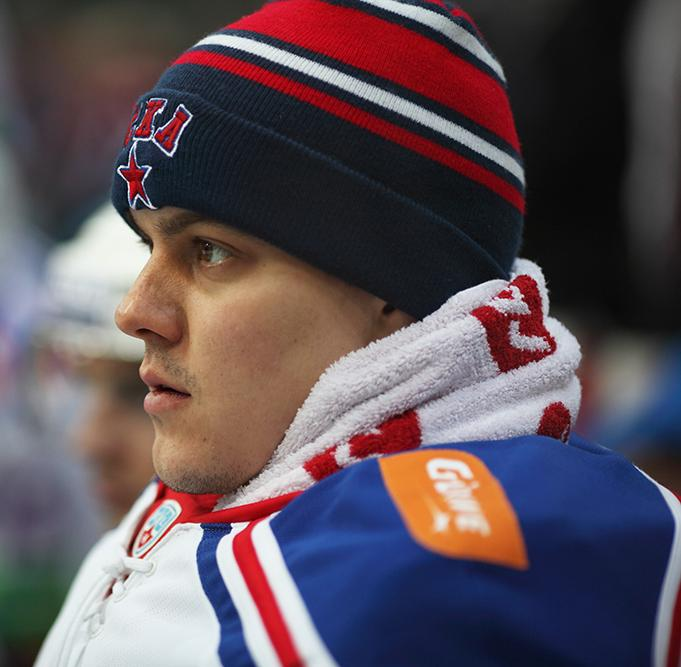
- Born: January 12, 1987 (age 39) Krasnodar, Russian SFSR, Soviet Union
- Height: 6 ft 2 in (188 cm)
- Weight: 187 lb (85 kg; 13 st 5 lb)
- Position: Goaltender
- Caught: Left
- Played for: SKA Saint Petersburg; HC Lada Togliatti; Neftekhimik Nizhnekamsk; HC Vityaz; Salavat Yulaev Ufa
- Current AHL coach: Laval Rocket
- NHL draft: Undrafted
- Playing career: 2008–2026

Ilya Ezhov (born January 12, 1987) is a Russian-Canadian professional ice hockey coach and former goaltender. He is currently the goaltender coach for the Laval Rocket of the American Hockey League (AHL).

== Early life and junior career ==
Ilya Ezhov was born in Krasnodar and moved to Montreal with his family when he was seven years old. In Canada he first started playing hockey as a forward, but switched to goaltending at the age of 13.

In 2005, he won the Fred Page Cup with the Hawkesbury Hawks of the Central Junior A Hockey League (CJHL). He then joined the expansion St. John's Fog Devils for two seasons in the Quebec Major Junior Hockey League (QMJHL). The team did not offer him an overage player slot, so he joined the Melfort Mustangs of the Saskatchewan Junior Hockey League (SJHL) for a season and won the league's MVP award.

== Professional career ==
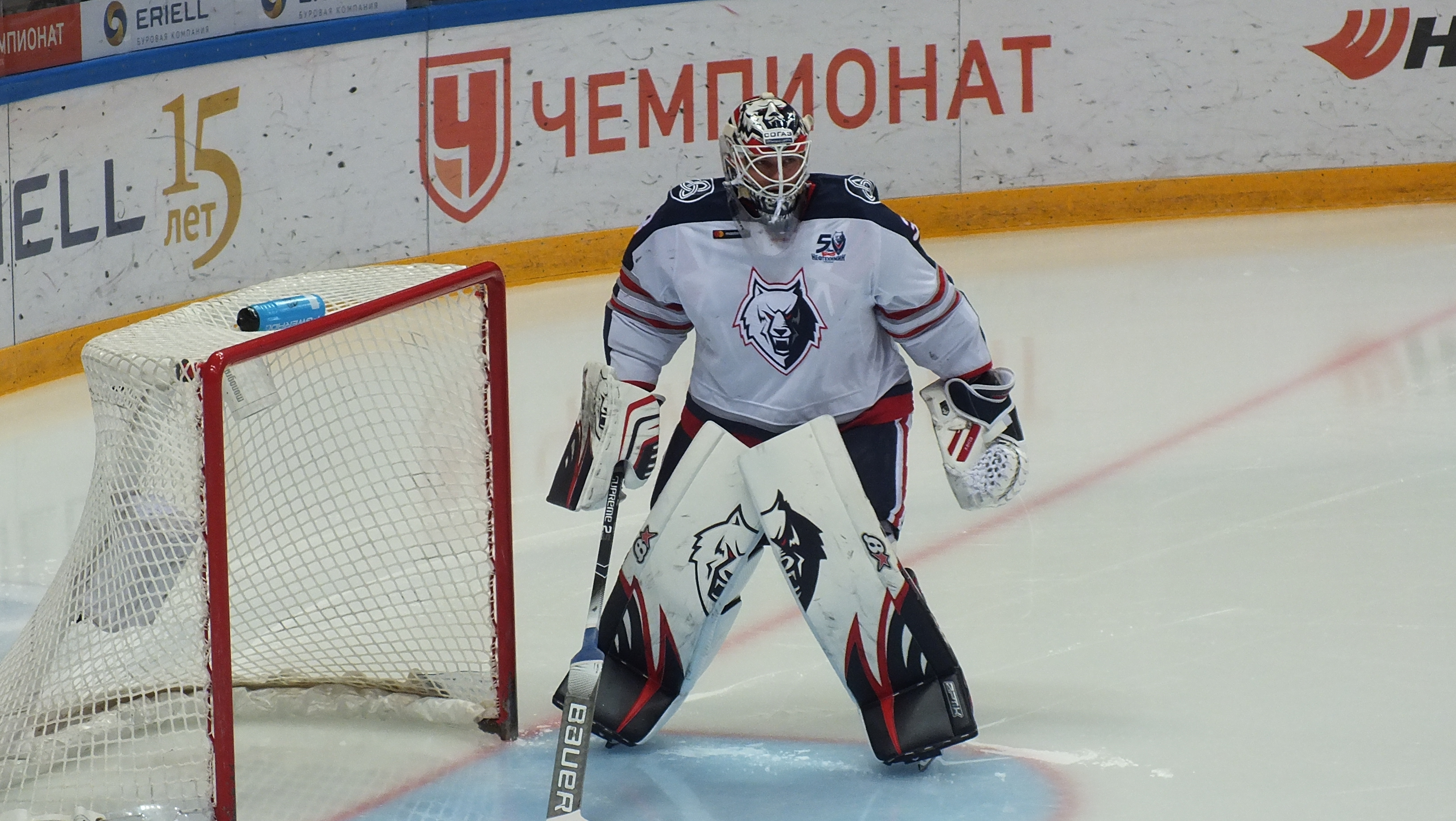
Ezhov with HC Neftekhimik Nizhnekamsk in 2019

After graduating from junior hockey, Ezhov returned to Russia for training camp with SKA Saint Petersburg. He was offered a three-year two-way contract, and played it out with SKA's farm club HC VMF. In 2011, he was first promoted to play for SKA in the Kontinental Hockey League. With SKA he established himself as a capable backup goaltender.

On September 6, 2014, Ezhov was traded to HC Lada Togliatti to begin the 2014–15 KHL season. He became Lada's starting goaltender, then on December 25 he returned to SKA. The president of the Association of Hockey Agents Sergey Paremuzov criticized the transfer, accusing SKA of circumventing the KHL's regulations.

Ezhov won the Gagarin Cup with SKA in 2015, though he did not play any games in the playoffs and served as the backup to Mikko Koskinen.

At the end of the 2015–16 KHL season, Ezhov's contract with SKA expired and he rejoined Lada.

Before the 2017-18 KHL season, Ezhov joined HC Neftekhimik Nizhnekamsk. While playing for Neftekhimik, he was selected for 2018's KHL All-Star Game.

After two seasons as the starting goaltender for Neftekhimik, Ezhov left as a free agent to sign a one-year contract with HC Vityaz on July 12, 2019.

Ezhov spent three seasons with Vityaz Podolsk before leaving as a free agent to sign a one-year contract with Salavat Yulaev Ufa on May 5, 2022.

On May 1, 2024 Ezhov announced his retirement. However, on September 19, he joined the Laval Petroliers of the Ligue Nord-Americaine de Hockey (LNAH).

=== National team ===
Ezhov was called to play for Russia at the 2012 Sweden Hockey Games.

== Coaching career ==
In 2024, while still playing in the LNAH, Ezhov started his coaching career by becoming the goaltender coach for the Concordia University Stingers. In his first season with the team, the Stingers won the first Queen's Cup in their history as champions of the Ontario University Athletics conference, and won silver medals at the national tournament as they lost the national championship game to the University of Ottawa Gee-Gees 2-3.

In 2026, Ezhov was hired as the interim goaltender coach of the Laval Rocket in the American Hockey League (AHL). He remained in Laval's coaching staff for the 2026-27 AHL season.

== Personal life ==
Ezhov is a dual citizen of Canada and Russia. He and his wife Amy have a daughter, Brielle Elizabeth, born in 2015, and a son, Tyson, born in 2017.

== Career statistics ==
=== Regular season and playoffs ===
			Regular season							Playoffs
Season	Team	League	GP	W	L	OTL	SO	GAA	SV%	GP	W	L	SO	GAA	SV%
2004-05	Hawkesbury Hawks	CJHL	30	-	-	-	3	3.55	.884	-	-	-	-	-	-
2005-06	St. John's Fog Devils	QMJHL	39	16	17	0	0	4.11	.886	1	0	0	0	3.93	.500
2006-07	St. John's Fog Devils	QMJHL	52	22	25	3	1	4.15	.876	3	0	2	0	4.28	.893
2007-08	Melfort Mustangs	SJHL	40	28	8	2	4	2.01	.925	10	3	7	2	2.81	.895
2008-09	HC VMF	Vysshaya Liga	47	17	28	0	3	3.01	-	-	-	-	-	-	-
2009-10	HC VMF	Vysshaya Liga	31	15	13	3	4	2.19	.915	2	0	2	0	2.81	-
2010-11	HC VMF	VHL	49	22	20	7	3	2.40	.922	5	3	2	1	2.41	.934
2011-12	SKA Saint Petersburg	KHL	22	12	3	5	1	2.26	.920	3	1	1	1	2.16	.913
2012-13	SKA Saint Petersburg	KHL	21	15	5	1	2	2.23	.920	11	6	4	2	1.77	.933
2013-14	SKA Saint Petersburg	KHL	18	12	3	2	1	1.91	.920	-	-	-	-	-	-
2014-15	HC Lada Togliatti	KHL	33	11	19	3	2	2.23	.929	-	-	-	-	-	-
2014-15	SKA Saint Petersburg	KHL	2	1	1	0	0	1.02	.963	-	-	-	-	-	-
2015-16	SKA Saint Petersburg	KHL	16	7	5	3	0	2.16	.926	-	-	-	-	-	-
2016-17	HC Lada Togliatti	KHL	50	14	27	7	3	2.61	.929	-	-	-	-	-	-
2017-18	HC Neftekhimik Nizhnekamsk	KHL	50	23	18	5	7	2.18	.930	4	0	4	0	3.71	.879
2018-19	HC Neftekhimik Nizhnekamsk	KHL	50	19	27	3	1	2.43	.911	-	-	-	-	-	-
2019-20	HC Vityaz Podolsk	KHL	44	14	20	9	2	2.56	.921	4	0	2	0	3.99	.887
2020-21	HC Vityaz Podolsk	KHL	38	13	16	6	3	2.79	.913	-	-	-	-	-	-
2021-22	HC Vityaz Podolsk	KHL	32	6	16	6	1	2.76	.913	-	-	-	-	-	-
2022-23	Salavat Yulaev Ufa	KHL	44	22	10	9	4	2.14	.924	6	2	4	1	2.14	.924
2023-24	Salavat Yulaev Ufa	KHL	21	10	8	0	2	2.46	.902	-	-	-	-	-	-
2024-25	Laval Petroliers	LNAH	14	6	6	0	1	3.78	.889	3	1	2	0	4.02	.879
2025-26	Laval Petroliers	LNAH	2	1	1	0	0	4.44	.857	-	-	-	-	-	-
KHL totals			440	179	178	59	30	2.38	.921	28	9	15	3	2.43	.914
