= Jan Kovář =

Czech ice hockey player (born 1990)

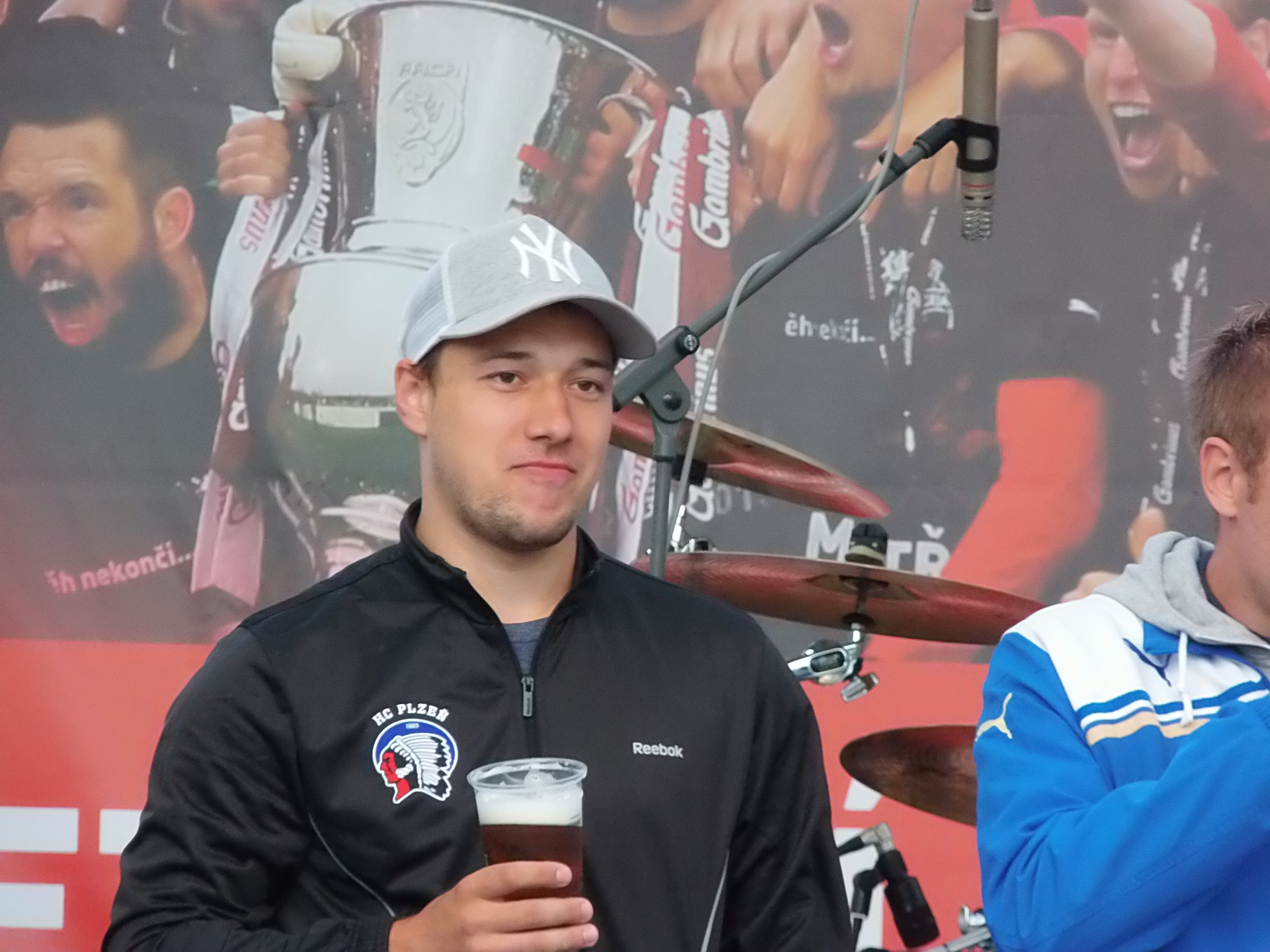
- Born: March 20, 1990 (age 36) Písek, Czechoslovakia
- Height: 5 ft 11 in (180 cm)
- Weight: 216 lb (98 kg; 15 st 6 lb)
- Position: Forward
- Shoots: Right
- NL team Former teams: EV Zug; HC Plzeň; Metallurg Magnitogorsk; Providence Bruins
- National team: Czech Republic
- NHL draft: Undrafted
- Playing career: 2008–present

Jan Kovář (born 20 March 1990) is a Czech professional ice hockey forward who currently serves as captain of EV Zug of the National League (NL). He is the younger brother of Jakub Kovář.

== Playing career ==
He made his professional debut with HC Plzeň in the Czech Extraliga during the 2008–09 season. Before moving to Russia for the 2013–14 KHL season in signing for Metallurg Magnitogorsk and claiming the Gagarin Cup. Playing within the Czech national team he advanced to the semi-finals before being knocked out. In the bronze medal playoff, he scored against Canada, but the team could not win.

As an undrafted free agent after five seasons in the KHL with Magnitogorsk, Kovář signed a one-year, $2 million contract with the New York Islanders, his first team in the NHL, on 9 July 2018. On 10 October, after failing to make the team following training camp he was placed on unconditional waivers by the Islanders with the intent of terminating his contract due to facing limited opportunities to continue his adaptation to the North American style if he reported to the AHL with affiliate, Bridgeport Sound Tigers. With the intention to continue his career in North America, Kovář secured a professional try-out contract with the Providence Bruins of the American Hockey League (AHL) on 18 October. On 5 December, Kovář signed a one-month contract HC Plzeň of the Czech Extraliga (ELH).

After playing out the season in the ELH, Kovář left in the off-season, securing a one-year contract with Swiss club EV Zug of the NL on 18 June 2019. His contract included an NHL out-clause through 25 June.

== Career statistics ==
=== Regular season and playoffs ===
			Regular season					Playoffs
Season	Team	League	GP	G	A	Pts	PIM	GP	G	A	Pts	PIM
2004–05	IHC Písek	CZE U18	47	16	4	20	44	—	—	—	—	—
2005–06	IHC Písek	CZE.2 U18	13	17	10	27	24	—	—	—	—	—
2005–06	HC Lasselsberger Plzeň	CZE U18	40	10	23	33	28	6	2	5	7	8
2006–07	HC Lasselsberger Plzeň	CZE U18	41	40	39	79	79	8	2	3	5	18
2006–07	HC Lasselsberger Plzeň	CZE U20	1	0	1	1	2	—	—	—	—	—
2007–08	HC Lasselsberger Plzeň	CZE U20	45	24	34	58	60	5	2	4	6	2
2008–09	HC Lasselsberger Plzeň	CZE U20	13	13	13	26	24	—	—	—	—	—
2008–09	HC Lasselsberger Plzeň	ELH	44	2	7	9	18	17	2	5	7	6
2008–09	SHC Klatovy	CZE.3	4	3	1	4	4	—	—	—	—	—
2009–10	HC Plzeň 1929	CZE U20	4	2	3	5	0	—	—	—	—	—
2009–10	HC Plzeň 1929	ELH	38	4	9	13	26	6	1	6	7	2
2009–10	KLH Chomutov	CZE.2	—	—	—	—	—	2	2	0	2	2
2010–11	HC Plzeň 1929	ELH	50	19	19	38	38	4	0	2	2	4
2010–11	HC Slovan Ústečtí Lvi	CZE.2	—	—	—	—	—	6	4	2	6	4
2011–12	HC Plzeň 1929	ELH	52	18	33	51	52	12	2	6	8	10
2011–12	Piráti Chomutov	CZE.2	—	—	—	—	—	1	0	3	3	0
2012–13	HC Skoda Plzeň	ELH	52	17	34	51	66	20	11	15	26	12
2013–14	Metallurg Magnitogorsk	KHL	54	23	45	68	46	21	8	18	26	16
2014–15	Metallurg Magnitogorsk	KHL	60	24	44	68	50	10	2	7	9	16
2015–16	Metallurg Magnitogorsk	KHL	58	20	32	52	61	23	8	15	23	10
2016–17	Metallurg Magnitogorsk	KHL	59	23	40	63	22	18	10	15	25	22
2017–18	Metallurg Magnitogorsk	KHL	54	7	28	35	80	11	4	4	8	4
2018–19	Providence Bruins	AHL	12	4	6	10	10	—	—	—	—	—
2018–19	HC Skoda Plzeň	ELH	28	7	26	33	32	14	3	10	13	28
2019–20	EV Zug	NL	50	14	31	45	48	—	—	—	—	—
2020–21	EV Zug	NL	52	16	47	63	58	13	1	14	15	22
2021–22	EV Zug	NL	46	9	34	43	94	15	5	16	21	12
ELH totals			264	67	128	195	232	73	19	44	63	62
KHL totals			285	97	189	286	259	83	32	59	91	68

=== International ===
Year	Team	Event	Result	GP	G	A	Pts	PIM
2008	Czech Republic	WJC18 D1	11th	5	1	7	8	2
2010	Czech Republic	WJC	7th	6	3	3	6	2
2013	Czech Republic	WC	7th	6	0	0	0	2
2014	Czech Republic	WC	4th	10	0	1	1	27
2015	Czech Republic	WC	4th	10	3	6	9	6
2016	Czech Republic	WC	5th	8	1	3	4	4
2017	Czech Republic	WC	7th	8	2	3	5	0
2018	Czech Republic	OG	4th	6	3	2	5	2
2019	Czech Republic	WC	4th	10	5	5	10	6
2021	Czech Republic	WC	7th	7	2	3	5	2
2022	Czech Republic	OG	9th	4	0	2	2	4
Junior totals				11	4	10	14	4
Senior totals				59	16	25	41	53

== Awards and honors ==
Award	Year
KHL
Gagarin Cup	2014, 2016
All-Star Game	2014, 2016
Golden Helmet Award; All-Star team	2016
Three Snipers Award; Most goal-scoring line	2014
