= Pavel Dedunov =

Russian ice hockey player (born 1990)

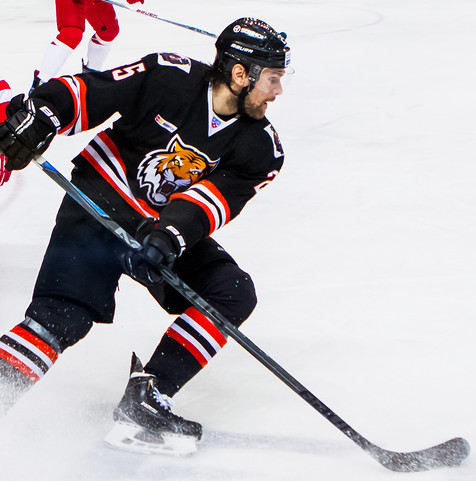
- Born: April 8, 1990 (age 36) Bolshoy Kamen, Russian SFSR, Soviet Union
- Height: 6 ft 0 in (183 cm)
- Weight: 207 lb (94 kg; 14 st 11 lb)
- Position: Forward
- Shoots: Left
- KHL team Former teams: Free agent Amur Khabarovsk; Severstal Cherepovets; Avangard Omsk; SKA Saint Petersburg; HC Sochi
- Playing career: 2005–present

Pavel Vladimirovich Dedunov (Russian: Павел Владимирович Дедунов; born April 8, 1990) is a Russian professional ice hockey forward who is currently an unrestricted free agent. He most recently played for HC Sochi of the Kontinental Hockey League (KHL).

== Playing career ==
Dedunov has previously played six seasons with Amur Khabarovsk through two separate tenures with the club. Following the 2018–19 season, Dedunov left as a free agent to sign a two-year contract with his third KHL club, Avangard Omsk, on 2 May 2019.

Clinching the Gagarin Cup during his four season tenure with Avangard Osmk, Dedunov left to sign a two-year contract with fellow contending club, SKA Saint Petersburg on 1 May 2023.

Following a lone season with SKA and approaching his final season under contract with SKA, Dedunov was traded to HC Sochi in exchange for a prospect and financial compensation on 25 July 2025.

== Awards and honours ==
Award	Year
MHL
All-Star Game	2011, 2012
KHL
Gagarin Cup (Avangard Omsk)	2021
