= Alexander Sharychenkov =

Russian ice hockey player

- Born: October 3, 1991 (age 34) Nizhny Novgorod, Russian SFSR
- Height: 6 ft 4 in (193 cm)
- Weight: 207 lb (94 kg; 14 st 11 lb)
- Position: Goaltender
- Caught: Left
- Played for: Dynamo Moscow; HC Yugra; Ak Bars Kazan; Neftekhimik Nizhnekamsk; CSKA Moscow; Salavat Yulaev Ufa; Torpedo Nizhny Novgorod
- Playing career: 2010–2025

Alexander Sharychenkov (born October 3, 1991) is a Russian former professional ice hockey goaltender.

== Playing career ==
Sharychenkov made his debut with Dynamo Moscow during the 2012–13 season.

In 2017-18, Sharychenkov won the Gagarin Cup with Ak Bars Kazan as the backup to Emil Garipov.

After a successful 2019–20 season, with Neftkhimik Nizhnekamsk, Sharychenkov left out of contract and agreed to a two-year contract with contending club, CSKA Moscow on 1 May 2020.

Having played the 2020–21 season with CSKA notching 18 wins through 36 regular season games, on 1 June 2021, Sharychenkov was traded by CSKA Moscow to Salavat Yulaev Ufa in exchange for financial compensation.

After a lone season with Salavat, Sharychenkov opted to return as a free agent to newly crowned champions and previous club, CSKA Moscow, in agreeing to a two-year contract on 5 May 2022. In 2022-23, Sharychenkov won his second Gagarin Cup, serving as the backup to Adam Reideborn with CSKA.

In October 2024, Sharychenkov signed a two-way deal with his hometown team, Torpedo Nizhny Novgorod of the KHL. He spent the season with their VHL affiliate Torpedo-Gorky NN, where he won the league's championship.

On 11 June 2025, Sharychenkov announced his retirement.

== Awards and honours ==
Award	Year
KHL
Gagarin Cup (Ak Bars Kazan)	2018
Gagarin Cup (CSKA Moscow)	2023
