= Igor Saprykin =

Russian ice hockey goaltender

- Born: January 30, 1992 (age 33); Moscow, Russia
- Height: 5 ft 11 in (180 cm)
- Weight: 179 lb (81 kg; 12 st 11 lb)
- Position: Goaltender
- Catches: Left
- VHL team Former teams: AKM Tula Region; HC Vityaz; Kunlun Red Star
- Playing career: 2012–present

Igor Saprykin (born January 30, 1992) is a Russian professional ice hockey goaltender currently playing for AKM Tula Region in the Supreme Hockey League (VHL).

Saprykin made his professional debut with HC Vityaz of the Kontinental Hockey League during the 2012–13 season.
