= 2014–15 KHL season =

- League: Kontinental Hockey League
- Sport: Ice hockey
- Duration: 3 September 2014 – 19 April 2015
- Number of games: 60
- Number of teams: 28

Regular season
- Continental Cup winner: (Russia) CSKA Moscow
- Top scorer: (Russia) Alexander Radulov

Playoffs
- Western champions: (Russia) SKA Saint Petersburg
- Western runners-up: (Russia) CSKA Moscow
- Eastern champions: (Russia) Ak Bars Kazan
- Eastern runners-up: (Russia) Sibir Novosibirsk

Gagarin Cup
- Champions: (Russia) SKA Saint Petersburg
- Runners-up: (Russia) Ak Bars Kazan

KHL seasons
- ← 2013–14 2015–16 →

The 2014–15 KHL season was the seventh season of the Kontinental Hockey League. The season started on 3 September with the Opening Cup between defending champions Metallurg Magnitogorsk and Dynamo Moscow, replacing Lev Praha, last year's runner up who did not participate this season.

== Team changes ==
Prior to the season, the KHL added three more teams: Jokerit from Helsinki, Lada Togliatti (an earlier member of the KHL that spent the last four seasons in the VHL) and HC Sochi, an expansion team from Sochi.

HC Donbass did not play in the league this season, due to the war in Donbas, which caused a devastating fire at their home arena. Donbass intended to rejoin KHL for the 2015–16 season, but ultimately joined the new Ukrainian Hockey Extra League. HC Lev Praha didn't participate in KHL this season either, because of financial problems. In addition, Spartak Moscow did not participate in the league this season, after missing the deadline for shoring up its finances.

== Divisions and regular season format ==
New for this season, is that the teams primarily play games against teams in their own division, and secondarily against teams in their own conference, and finally against teams in the other conference. According to the new format (subject to final approval by the League management) each team will play a total of 60 games during the regular season as follows:

- 24 games against the other teams in their division (two at home and two on the road against each opponent),
- 14 games (one at home and one on the road against each opponent), against the teams in the other division in their conference,
- 14 more against teams from the other conference (comprising seven home games versus teams from one division and seven road games against teams from the other),
- 8 games where four will be against teams in their own conference (two at home, two on the road) and four against opposition from the other conference (again, two at home and two on the road). When determining the opponents and venues for these additional 8 games, the League consider practical things, including the geographical locations and the availability of the arenas.

How the teams are divided into divisions and conferences are shown in the table below.

| Western Conference | Eastern Conference |

| Bobrov Division | Tarasov Division | Kharlamov Division | Chernyshev Division |
|---|---|---|---|
| (Finland) Jokerit | (Russia) Torpedo Nizhny Novgorod | (Russia) Ak Bars Kazan | (Russia) Admiral Vladivostok |
| (Belarus) Dinamo Minsk | (Russia) CSKA Moscow | (Russia) Avtomobilist Yekaterinburg | (Russia) Amur Khabarovsk |
| (Latvia) Dinamo Riga | (Russia) Dynamo Moscow | (Russia) Yugra Khanty-Mansiysk | (Russia) Avangard Omsk |
| (Russia) Atlant Moscow Oblast | (Russia) Lokomotiv Yaroslavl | (Russia) Metallurg Magnitogorsk | (Kazakhstan) Barys Astana |
| (Croatia) Medveščak Zagreb | (Russia) Severstal Cherepovets | (Russia) Neftekhimik Nizhnekamsk | (Russia) Metallurg Novokuznetsk |
| (Russia) SKA Saint Petersburg | (Russia) HC Sochi | (Russia) Lada Togliatti | (Russia) Salavat Yulaev Ufa |
| (Slovakia) Slovan Bratislava | (Russia) Vityaz Podolsk | (Russia) Traktor Chelyabinsk | (Russia) Sibir Novosibirsk |

== Regular season ==
The regular season began on 3 September 2014 with the Opening Cup between Metallurg Magnitogorsk and Dynamo Moscow. Metallurg won the game 6–1.

=== Player statistics ===
==== Scoring leaders ====
GP = Games played; G = Goals; A = Assists; Pts = Points; +/– = P Plus–minus; PIM = Penalty minutes

As of 24 Feb 2015

| Player | Team | GP | G | A | Pts | +/– | PIM |
|---|---|---|---|---|---|---|---|
| (Russia) Alexander Radulov | CSKA Moscow | 46 | 24 | 47 | 71 | +37 | 143 |
| (Czech Republic) Jan Kovář | Metallurg Magnitogorsk | 60 | 24 | 44 | 68 | +15 | 50 |
| (Russia) Danis Zaripov | Metallurg Magnitogorsk | 60 | 24 | 40 | 64 | +13 | 40 |
| (France) Stéphane Da Costa | CSKA Moscow | 46 | 30 | 32 | 62 | +26 | 12 |
| (Russia) Artemy Panarin | SKA Saint Petersburg | 54 | 26 | 36 | 62 | +18 | 37 |
| (Belarus) Charles Linglet | Dinamo Minsk | 54 | 22 | 36 | 58 | –2 | 59 |
| (United States) Steve Moses | Jokerit | 60 | 36 | 21 | 57 | +11 | 20 |
| (Canada) Matt Ellison | Dinamo Minsk | 58 | 24 | 33 | 57 | –2 | 38 |
| (Canada) Nigel Dawes | Barys Astana | 60 | 32 | 24 | 56 | +18 | 48 |
| (Russia) Denis Parshin | Avangard Omsk | 60 | 25 | 31 | 56 | +18 | 40 |

==== Leading goaltenders ====
GP = Games played; Min = Minutes played; W = Wins; L = Losses; SOP = Shootouts played; GA = Goals against; SO = Shutouts; SV% = Save percentage; GAA = Goals against average

As of 24 Feb 2015

| Player | Team | GP | Min | W | L | SOP | GA | SO | SV% | GAA |
|---|---|---|---|---|---|---|---|---|---|---|
| (Belarus) Kevin Lalande | CSKA Moscow | 23 | 1297:10 | 16 | 3 | 2 | 30 | 6 | .934 | 1.39 |
| (Russia) Alexander Lazushin | Dynamo Moscow | 21 | 1156:59 | 13 | 3 | 1 | 28 | 5 | .946 | 1.45 |
| (Sweden) Anders Nilsson | Ak Bars Kazan | 38 | 2247:52 | 20 | 9 | 8 | 64 | 5 | .936 | 1.71 |
| (Russia) Emil Garipov | Ak Bars Kazan | 23 | 1383:26 | 16 | 5 | 2 | 41 | 1 | .933 | 1.78 |
| (Russia) Stanislav Galimov | CSKA Moscow | 35 | 2055:31 | 23 | 5 | 5 | 61 | 6 | .919 | 1.78 |

== Russian Ice Hockey Championship ==
At the end of the regular season of the KHL Championship the following teams became medalists of the Russian Ice Hockey Championship:

| Rank | Team |
|---|---|
| Gold medal | (Russia) CSKA Moscow |
| Silver medal | (Russia) SKA Saint Petersburg |
| Bronze medal | (Russia) Dynamo Moscow |

== Playoffs ==
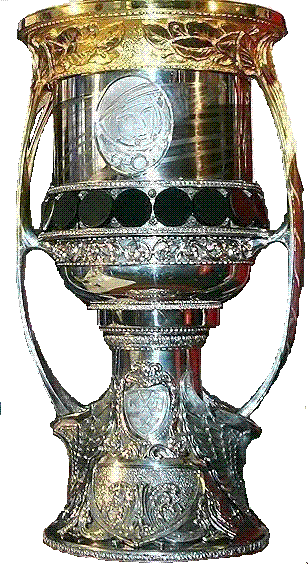
Gagarin Cup

The playoffs started on February 27, 2015, with the top eight teams from each of the conferences and ended on April 19th with the last game of the Gagarin Cup final.

SKA Saint Petersburg won the trophy for the first time in its history after defeating Ak Bars Kazan in the final series. Before that, they won the conference final after trailing 0-3 against CSKA Moscow, which is the only reverse sweep in the history of the KHL.

=== Bracket ===
Conference Quarterfinals | Conference Semifinals
1 | (Russia) Ak Bars | 4
8 | (Russia) Avtomobilist | 1
1 | (Russia) Ak Bars | 4
4 | (Russia) Avangard | 1
2 | (Russia) Sibir | 4
7 | (Russia) Traktor | 2
Eastern Conference
3 | (Russia) Metallurg Mg | 4
6 | (Russia) Salavat Yulaev | 1
2 | (Russia) Sibir | 4
3 | (Russia) Metallurg Mg | 1
4 | (Russia) Avangard | 4
5 | (Kazakhstan) Barys | 3
1 | (Russia) CSKA | 4
8 | (Russia) HC Sochi | 0
1 | (Russia) CSKA | 4
4 | (Finland) Jokerit | 1
2 | (Russia) SKA | 4
7 | (Russia) Torpedo | 1
Western Conference
3 | (Russia) Dynamo Msk | 4
6 | (Russia) Lokomotiv | 2
2 | (Russia) SKA | 4
3 | (Russia) Dynamo Msk | 1
4 | (Finland) Jokerit | 4
5 | (Belarus) Dinamo Mn | 1

Conference Finals
1 | (Russia) Ak Bars | 4
2 | (Russia) Sibir | 1
1 | (Russia) CSKA | 3
2 | (Russia) SKA | 4

Gagarin Cup Finals
1 | (Russia) Ak Bars | 1
2 | (Russia) SKA | 4

== Final standings ==
| Rank | Team |
|---|---|
| 1 | (Russia) SKA Saint Petersburg |
| 2 | (Russia) Ak Bars Kazan |
| 3 | (Russia) CSKA Moscow |
| 4 | (Russia) Sibir Novosibirsk |
| 5 | (Russia) Dynamo Moscow |
| 6 | (Finland) Jokerit |
| 7 | (Russia) Metallurg Magnitogorsk |
| 8 | (Russia) Avangard Omsk |
| 9 | (Belarus) Dinamo Minsk |
| 10 | (Russia) Lokomotiv Yaroslavl |
| 11 | (Kazakhstan) Barys Astana |
| 12 | (Russia) Torpedo Nizhny Novgorod |
| 13 | (Russia) HC Sochi |
| 14 | (Russia) Salavat Yulaev Ufa |
| 15 | (Russia) Traktor Chelyabinsk |
| 16 | (Russia) Avtomobilist Yekaterinburg |
| 17 | (Russia) Atlant Moscow Oblast |
| 18 | (Russia) Severstal Cherepovets |
| 19 | (Russia) Admiral Vladivostok |
| 20 | (Russia) Vityaz Podolsk |
| 21 | (Latvia) Dinamo Riga |
| 22 | (Russia) Neftekhimik Nizhnekamsk |
| 23 | (Croatia) Medveščak Zagreb |
| 24 | (Russia) Lada Togliatti |
| 25 | (Russia) Yugra Khanty-Mansiysk |
| 26 | (Slovakia) Slovan Bratislava |
| 27 | (Russia) Metallurg Novokuznetsk |
| 28 | (Russia) Amur Khabarovsk |

== Awards ==
=== Players of the Month ===
Best KHL players of each month.

| Month | Goaltender | Defense | Forward | Rookie |
|---|---|---|---|---|
| September | (Russia) Stanislav Galimov (CSKA Moscow) | (Russia) Anton Belov (SKA St. Petersburg) | (Russia) Sergei Shirokov (Avangard Omsk) | (Russia) Vladislav Kamenev (Metallurg Magnitogorsk) |
| October | (Russia) Ivan Kasutin (Torpedo Nizhny Novgorod) | (Russia) Maxim Chudinov (SKA St. Petersburg) | (Russia) Artemy Panarin (SKA St. Petersburg) | (Russia) Ivan Nalimov (Admiral Vladivostok) |
| November | (Finland) Mikko Koskinen (Sibir Novosibirsk) | (Russia) Georgi Misharin (CSKA Moscow) | (Russia) Igor Grigorenko (CSKA Moscow) | (Russia) Pavel Koledov (HC Sochi) |
| December | (Canada) Michael Garnett (Traktor Chelyabinsk) | (United States) Nick Bailen (Dinamo Minsk) | (Russia) Dmitri Kugryshev (Sibir Novosibirsk) | (Russia) Damir Musin (Ak Bars Kazan) |
| January | (Russia) Alexander Lazushin (Dynamo Moscow) | (Russia) Alexei Semenov (Vityaz Podolsk) | (Russia) Mikhail Varnakov (Ak Bars Kazan) | (Russia) Vyacheslav Leshchenko (Atlant Moscow Oblast) |
| February | (Sweden) Anders Nilsson (Ak Bars Kazan) | (United States) Deron Quint (Traktor Chelyabinsk) | (Canada) (Belarus) Charles Linglet (Dinamo Minsk) | (Russia) Maxim Mamin (CSKA Moscow) |
| March | (Sweden) Anders Nilsson (Ak Bars Kazan) | (Russia) Denis Denisov (CSKA Moscow) | (Russia) Alexander Radulov (CSKA Moscow) | (Russia) Kirill Semyonov (Avangard Omsk) |
| April | (Finland) Mikko Koskinen (SKA St. Petersburg) | (Russia) Maxim Chudinov (SKA St. Petersburg) | (Russia) Evgenii Dadonov (SKA St. Petersburg) | Not awarded |

== Milestones ==
- On September 13, 2014, the Metallurg Magnitogorsk forward Sergei Mozyakin recorded his 400th KHL regular season career point. He became the first player in league history to reach this milestone.
- On September 24, 2014, the Metallurg Magnitogorsk forward Danis Zaripov recorded his 300th KHL regular season career point. He became the third player in league history to reach this milestone.
- On October 5, 2014, Ak Bars Kazan coach Zinetula Bilyaletdinov coached his 800th career game in Russian championships.
- On October 6, 2014, Torpedo Nizhny Novgorod forward Wojtek Wolski set a new league record for the fastest hat-trick in the game against Sibir Novosibirsk scoring in 1 minute 46 seconds.
- On February 18, 2015, Jokerit forward Steve Moses scored his 36th goal against Atlant Moscow Oblast and broke the league record for the most goals scored during one season.
