= Jakub Kovář =

Czech ice hockey goaltender

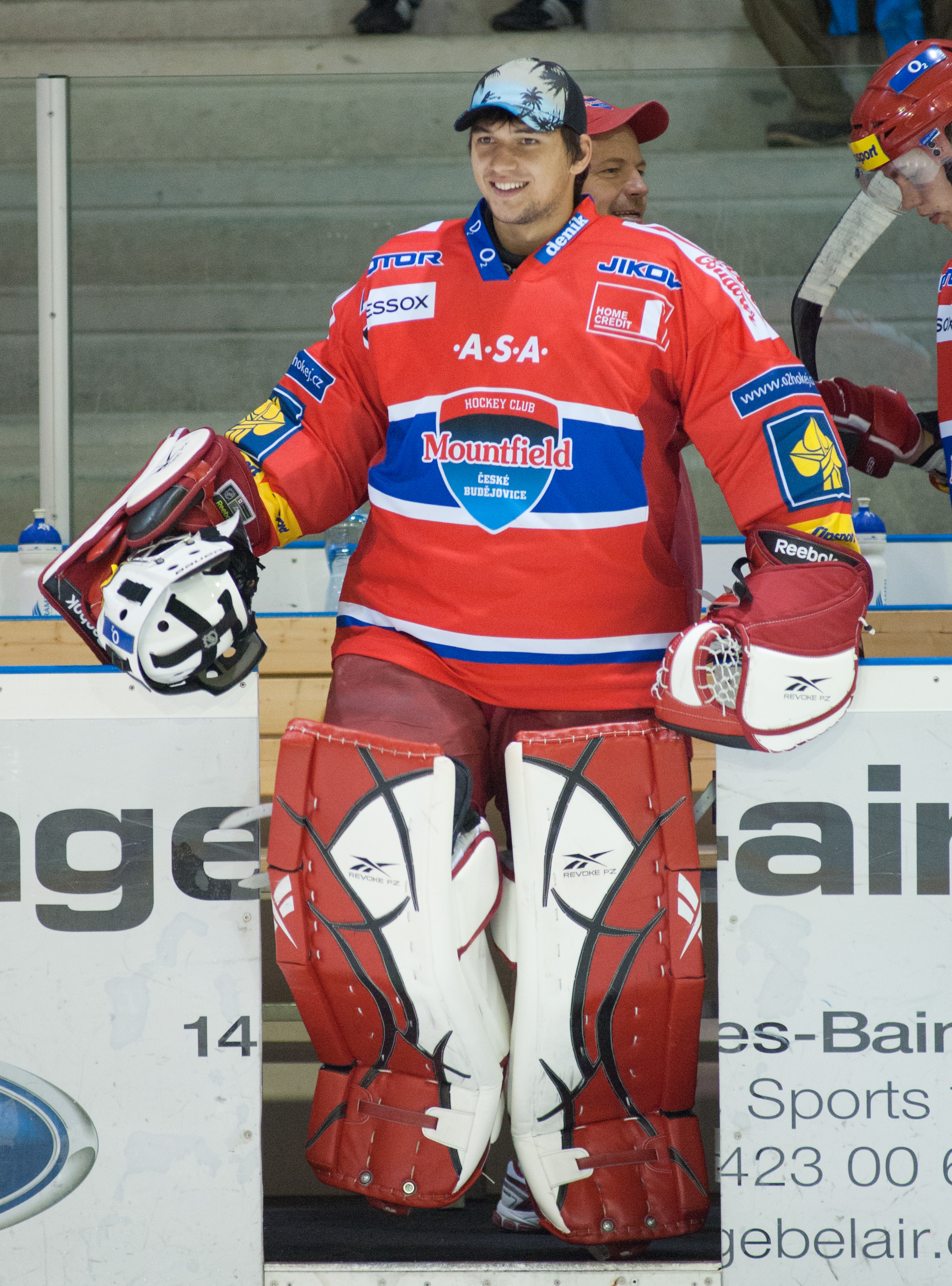
- Kovář with HC Mountfield in 2010
- Born: 19 July 1988 (age 38) Písek, Czechoslovakia
- Height: 6 ft 1 in (185 cm)
- Weight: 201 lb (91 kg; 14 st 5 lb)
- Position: Goaltender
- Catches: Left
- ELH team Former teams: HC Sparta Praha; HC České Budějovice; Severstal Cherepovets; Avtomobilist Yekaterinburg; ZSC Lions
- National team: Czech Republic
- NHL draft: 109th overall, 2006; Philadelphia Flyers
- Playing career: 2009–present
Medal record
World Championships
Bronze medal – third place	2011 Slovakia
Bronze medal – third place	2012 Finland

Jakub Kovář (born 19 July 1988) is a Czech professional ice hockey goaltender who is currently playing for HC Sparta Praha in the Czech Extraliga. He was selected by the Philadelphia Flyers in the 4th round (109th overall) of the 2006 NHL entry draft. He is the older brother of Jan Kovář.

== Playing career ==
Kovar played major junior hockey in the North American Ontario Hockey League with the Windsor Spitfires. He later returned home to continue his professional career with HC České Budějovice in the Czech Extraliga. He has also played for ZSC Lions in the National League (NL).

He has also played in the Kontinental Hockey League (KHL) with the Severstal Cherepovets and Avtomobilist Yekaterinburg.

== International play ==
Kovar participated at the 2011 IIHF World Championship as a member of the Czech Republic men's national ice hockey team.
