= Vyacheslav Leshchenko =

Russian ice hockey player

- Born: April 24, 1995 (age 31) Noginsk, Moscow Oblast, Russia
- Height: 5 ft 11 in (180 cm)
- Weight: 167 lb (76 kg; 11 st 13 lb)
- Position: Winger
- Shoots: Left
- KHL team Former teams: free agent Atlant Moscow Oblast; Spartak Moscow; Ak Bars Kazan; HC Sochi; Kunlun Red Star; HC Vityaz; Neftekhimik Nizhnekamsk; Salavat Yulaev Ufa; Sibir Novosibirsk
- Playing career: 2013–present

Vyacheslav Leshchenko (born April 24, 1995) is a Russian professional ice hockey right winger. He is currently a free agent.

== Playing career ==
Leshchenko made his Kontinental Hockey League debut playing with Atlant Moscow Oblast during the 2013–14 KHL season.

During the 2020–21 season, Leshchenko began the campaign with Chelmet Chelyabinsk of the VHL, while under contract to Traktor Chelyabinsk. After registering 1 goal in 3 games he was released from his contract with Traktor and on 22 November 2020, Leshchenko continued in the KHL, agreeing to a contract for the remainder of the season with HC Kunlun Red Star. He produced 8 goals and 14 points through 33 regular season games in his tenure with Kunlun.

As a free agent, Leshchenko returned to Russia in agreeing to a one-year deal with HC Vityaz on 15 June 2021. In the 2021–22 season, Leshchenko registered 4 goals and 7 points through 20 games before he transferred to HC Neftekhimik Nizhnekamsk on 16 December 2021.

As a free agent, Leshchenko left Neftekhimik and opted to sign a one-year contract with Salavat Yulaev Ufa on 4 May 2023.

After a lone season with Salavat, Leshchenko made a return to former club, Neftekhimik Nizhnekamsk, in signing a one-year contract on 2 May 2024.
