= Nikita Bespalov =

Russian ice hockey goaltender

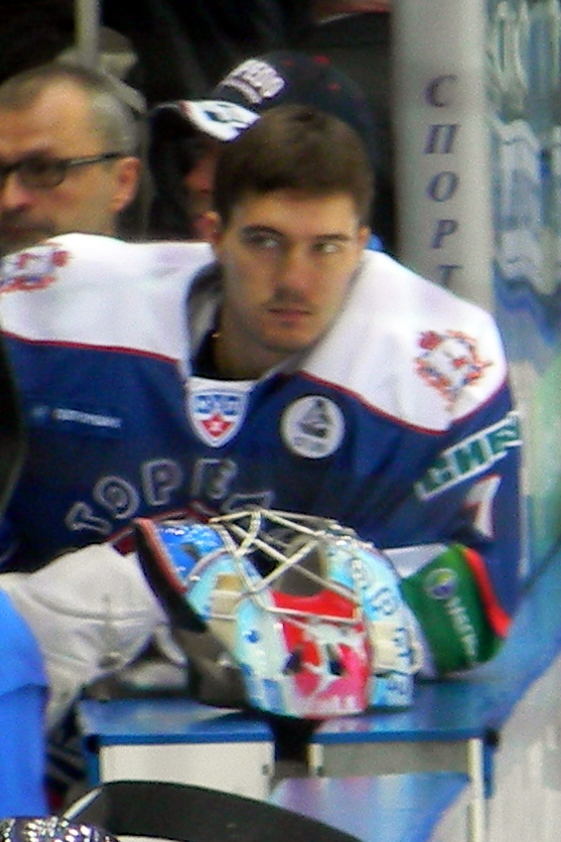
- Born: 28 December 1987 (age 38) Moscow, Russian SFSR, Soviet Union
- Height: 6 ft 1 in (185 cm)
- Weight: 183 lb (83 kg; 13 st 1 lb)
- Position: Goaltender
- Catches: Left
- Ligue Magnus team Former teams: Nice hockey Côte d'Azur; CSKA Moscow; Khimik Voskresensk; HC Sarov; Torpedo Nizhny Novgorod; Sibir Novosibirsk; Spartak Moscow; HC 21 Prešov
- Playing career: 2004–present

Nikita Bespalov (born 28 December 1987) is a Russian professional ice hockey Goaltender currently playing for Nice hockey Côte d'Azur of the Ligue Magnus.

He joined Spartak Moscow on a one-year contract after playing three seasons with HC Sibir Novosibirsk on 1 May 2016.
