= Anton Belov =

Russian ice hockey player (born 1986)

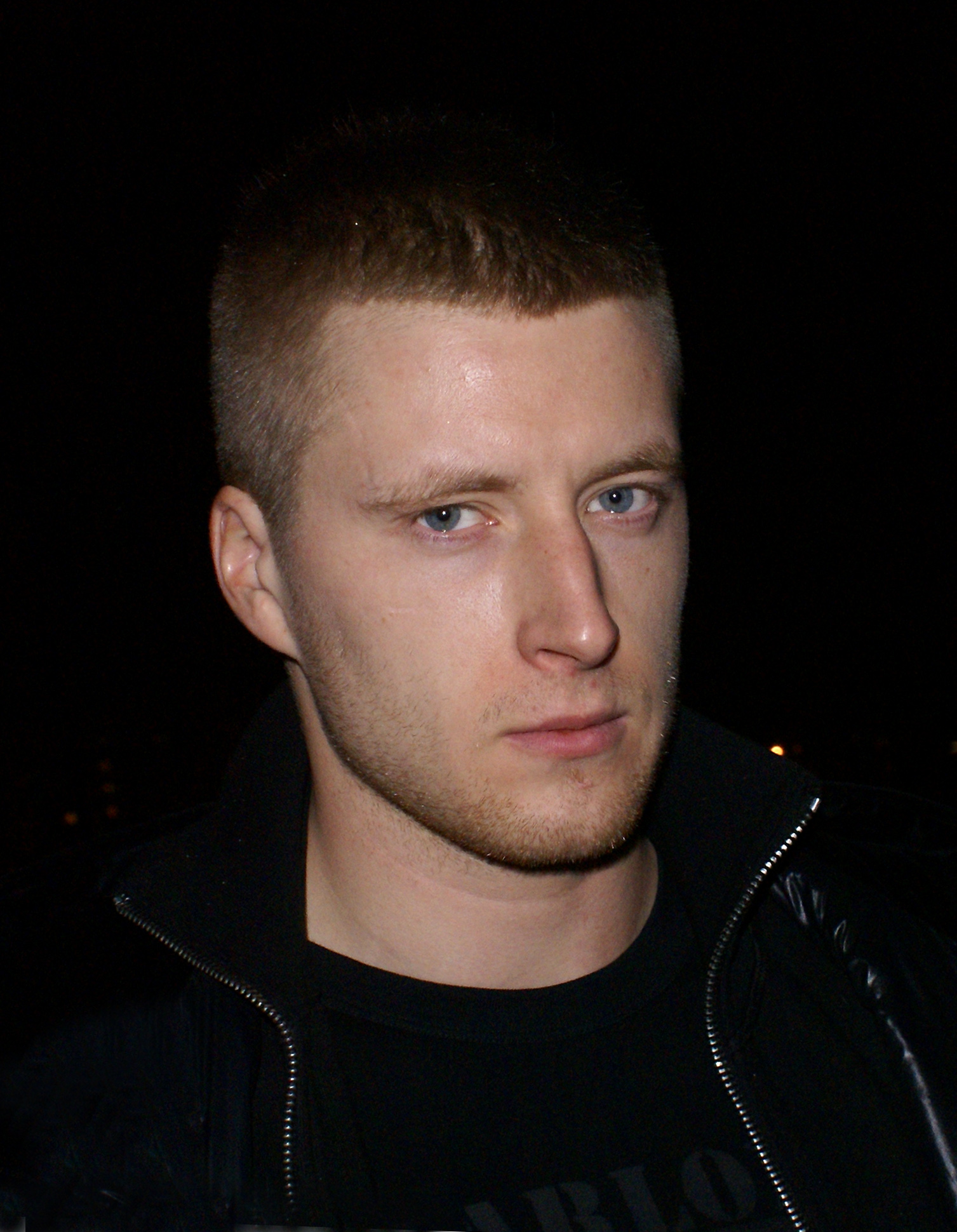
- Born: 29 July 1986 (age 39) Ryazan, Russian SFSR, Soviet Union
- Height: 6 ft 4 in (193 cm)
- Weight: 214 lb (97 kg; 15 st 4 lb)
- Position: Defence
- Shoots: Left
- KHL team Former teams: Free agent CSKA Moscow; Avangard Omsk; Edmonton Oilers; SKA Saint Petersburg; Dynamo Moscow
- National team: Russia
- NHL draft: Undrafted
- Playing career: 2004–present

Anton Sergeyevich Belov (Russian: Антон Серге́евич Бело́в; born 29 July 1986) is a Russian professional ice hockey defenceman. He is currently an unrestricted free agent who most recently played with Avangard Omsk in the Kontinental Hockey League (KHL). He has previously played with CSKA Moscow, SKA Saint Petersburg, Dynamo Moscow and played one season in the National Hockey League (NHL) with the Edmonton Oilers.

== Playing career ==
Belov made his professional debut with CSKA Moscow of the Russia Elite League in the 2004–05 season. Belov would play four seasons for Moscow. From 2008 to 2013, Belov played for Avangard Omsk of the Kontinental Hockey League (KHL). Belov played five seasons for Omsk.

In 2013, Belov decided he wanted to ply his trade in the NHL. On 30 May 2013, the Edmonton Oilers announced that they had signed Belov to a one-year entry-level contract. Belov made the team roster to begin the 2013–14 season. On 10 January 2014, Belov scored his first NHL goal against Jeff Zatkoff of the Pittsburgh Penguins. Despite his status as a top defenceman in the KHL, Belov was used in a depth role with the Oilers and finished the year with 7 points in 57 games.

On 16 April 2014, as an approaching free agent, Belov signed a lucrative four-year contract to return to the Russian KHL with SKA St. Petersburg.

Following a lone season with Dynamo Moscow in 2021–22, Belov returned to his former club, Avangard Omsk, as a free agent in signing a one-year contract on 3 May 2022.

== Career statistics ==
=== Regular season and playoffs ===
			Regular season					Playoffs
Season	Team	League	GP	G	A	Pts	PIM	GP	G	A	Pts	PIM
2002–03	Mechel–2 Chelyabinsk	RUS.3	21	2	2	4	12	—	—	—	—	—
2003–04	CSKA–2 Moscow	RUS.3	32	0	1	1	22	—	—	—	—	—
2003–04	Mechel Chelyabinsk	RUS.2	6	0	1	1	2	—	—	—	—	—
2003–04	Mechel–2 Chelyabinsk	RUS.3	8	3	3	6	8	—	—	—	—	—
2004–05	CSKA Moscow	RSL	30	0	0	0	14	—	—	—	—	—
2004–05	CSKA–2 Moscow	RUS.3	20	1	7	8	14	—	—	—	—	—
2005–06	CSKA Moscow	RSL	18	0	2	2	35	1	0	0	0	0
2005–06	CSKA–2 Moscow	RUS.3	6	1	2	3	2	—	—	—	—	—
2006–07	CSKA Moscow	RSL	49	4	5	9	42	12	1	3	4	8
2007–08	CSKA Moscow	RSL	54	1	4	5	69	6	1	1	2	16
2008–09	Avangard Omsk	KHL	38	1	4	5	71	5	1	0	1	4
2009–10	Avangard Omsk	KHL	39	1	10	11	48	—	—	—	—	—
2010–11	Avangard Omsk	KHL	54	4	10	14	28	8	1	2	3	4
2011–12	Avangard Omsk	KHL	50	0	6	6	30	18	1	2	3	12
2012–13	Avangard Omsk	KHL	46	9	17	26	30	12	1	3	4	24
2013–14	Edmonton Oilers	NHL	57	1	6	7	34	—	—	—	—	—
2014–15	SKA Saint Petersburg	KHL	36	3	5	8	12	20	1	6	7	13
2015–16	SKA Saint Petersburg	KHL	46	3	7	10	12	15	2	2	4	2
2016–17	SKA Saint Petersburg	KHL	56	9	18	27	12	18	3	11	14	10
2017–18	SKA Saint Petersburg	KHL	24	2	5	7	2	7	0	3	3	27
2018–19	SKA Saint Petersburg	KHL	41	6	10	16	8	17	0	1	1	4
2019–20	SKA Saint Petersburg	KHL	42	4	9	13	8	4	1	1	2	0
2020–21	SKA Saint Petersburg	KHL	37	2	6	8	8	7	0	0	0	2
2021–22	Dynamo Moscow	KHL	22	2	5	7	4	6	0	0	0	2
2022–23	Avangard Omsk	KHL	67	1	12	13	16	14	0	1	1	6
RSL totals			152	5	10	15	160	19	2	5	7	24
KHL totals			598	47	126	173	287	151	11	32	43	110
NHL totals			57	1	6	7	34	—	—	—	—	—

Medal record

Representing Russia

Ice hockey

World Championships
Gold medal – first place	2014 Belarus	
Silver medal – second place	2015 Czech Republic	
Bronze medal – third place	2016 Russia	
Bronze medal – third place	2017 Germany/France	

=== International ===
Year	Team	Event	Result	GP	G	A	Pts	PIM
2003	Russia	U18	3rd place, bronze medalist(s)	5	0	0	0	2
2003	Russia	IH18	2nd place, silver medalist(s)	5	0	2	2	8
2004	Russia	U18	1st place, gold medalist(s)	6	1	1	2	6
2005	Russia	WJC	2nd place, silver medalist(s)	6	0	0	0	2
2013	Russia	WC	6th	8	1	3	4	4
2014	Russia	OG	5th	5	1	0	1	0
2014	Russia	WC	1st place, gold medalist(s)	10	2	3	5	6
2015	Russia	WC	2nd place, silver medalist(s)	10	1	1	2	4
2016	Russia	WC	3rd place, bronze medalist(s)	9	2	5	7	0
2017	Russia	WC	3rd place, bronze medalist(s)	10	2	3	5	14
Junior totals				22	1	3	4	18
Senior totals				52	9	15	24	28

== Awards and honors ==
Award	Year
KHL
Gagarin Cup (SKA Saint Petersburg)	2015, 2017
Best P Plus–minus (+34)	2017
