= 2012–13 KHL season =

- League: Kontinental Hockey League
- Sport: Ice hockey
- Duration: 4 September 2012 – 17 April 2013
- Teams: 26
- Total attendance: 4,126,720 (Regular season)

Regular season
- Continental Cup winner: (Russia) SKA Saint Petersburg
- Season MVP: (Russia) Sergei Mozyakin
- Top scorer: (Russia) Sergei Mozyakin

Playoffs
- Western champions: (Russia) Dynamo Moscow
- Western runners-up: (Russia) SKA Saint Petersburg
- Eastern champions: (Russia) Traktor Chelyabinsk
- Eastern runners-up: (Russia) Ak Bars Kazan

Gagarin Cup
- Champions: (Russia) Dynamo Moscow
- Runners-up: (Russia) Traktor Chelyabinsk
- Finals MVP: (Russia) Alexander Eremenko; Dynamo Moscow

KHL seasons
- ← 2011–12 2013–14 →

The 2012–13 KHL season was the fifth season of the Kontinental Hockey League. The regular season began on 4 September with the Lokomotiv Cup between last year's finalists Dynamo Moscow and Avangard Omsk. The league consisted of 26 teams from 7 countries for the first time. Dynamo Moscow successfully defended their title after beating Traktor Chelyabinsk in the Gagarin Cup finals.

== Changes ==
=== Team changes ===
After withdrawing from the previous season in the wake of the 2011 Lokomotiv Yaroslavl plane crash that killed the team's entire active roster, Lokomotiv Yaroslavl returned to the KHL with new players.

Lev Poprad was disbanded, but a team of the same name, Lev Prague, was established in Prague, Czech Republic, while Slovan Bratislava joined the KHL and thus continues the league's presence in Slovakia. Also HC Donbass from Donetsk, Ukraine joined the league. The team previously played in the VHL. This brought the total number of teams to 26, representing 7 countries.

=== Salary cap ===
The salary cap changed from a soft cap to a hard cap, set at 1.1 billion rubles (approx. US$36.5 million), but each club can waive the cap for one player transferred directly from the NHL, if he is eligible to play for the Russian national team.

=== Season structure ===
The regular season consisted of 52 games for each team — twice (home and away) against each other team in the league and two extra games against a selected "rival" opponent (typically a geographically close team). This was a change from previous seasons, where all intra-division opponents were played more frequently. The top 8 teams from each conference qualified for the playoffs, which are played as best-of-seven series in each round.

=== Nadezhda Cup tournament ===
In January 2013, a new repechage tournament known as the Nadezhda Cup (Cup of Hope) was announced, which was held alongside the playoffs. Six teams from the Western Conference and four teams from the Eastern Conference who had not qualified for the playoffs competed in the tournament, whose prize includes the first overall pick in the next KHL Junior Draft. The new tournament was intended to extend the season, and help maintain interest in hockey for fans and players in preparation for the 2014 Winter Olympics. The first Cup of Hope was won by Dinamo Riga.

== Regular season ==
The regular season started on 4 September 2012 with the Lokomotiv Cup between the finalists of the previous season, Dynamo Moscow and Avangard Omsk. It ended on 17 February 2013 after every team had played 52 matches.

=== Notable events ===
==== NHL lockout ====
The league set up rules for the NHL lockout which lasted from 16 September 2012 to early January 2013. According to the special regulations, each KHL team was allowed to add up to 3 NHL players to their roster, among them at most one foreign player.

List of NHL players signing KHL lockout contracts Source: eliteprospect.com
Date	Player	NHL team	KHL Team
09/16/2012	(Russia) Evgeni Malkin (C)	(from) Pittsburgh Penguins	(to) Metallurg Magnitogorsk
09/16/2012	(Russia) Sergei Gonchar (D)	(from) Ottawa Senators	(to) Metallurg Magnitogorsk
09/16/2012	(Ukraine) Ruslan Fedotenko (LW)	(from) Philadelphia Flyers	(to) HC Donbass
09/16/2012	(Ukraine) Alexei Ponikarovsky (LW)	(from) Winnipeg Jets	(to) HC Donbass
09/16/2012	(Russia) Anton Khudobin (G)	(from) Boston Bruins	(to) Atlant Moscow Oblast
09/17/2012	(Slovakia) Ľubomír Višňovský (D)	(from) New York Islanders	(to) Slovan Bratislava
09/17/2012	(Latvia) Kaspars Daugaviņš (LW)	(from) Ottawa Senators	(to) Dinamo Riga
09/17/2012	(Russia) Nikolai Kulemin (RW)	(from) Toronto Maple Leafs	(to) Metallurg Magnitogorsk
09/17/2012	(Russia) Ilya Kovalchuk (RW)	(from) New Jersey Devils	(to) SKA Saint Petersburg
09/18/2012	(Czech Republic) Jakub Voráček (RW)	(from) Philadelphia Flyers	(to) Lev Prague
09/18/2012	(Finland) Niklas Bäckström (G)	(from) Minnesota Wild	(to) Dinamo Minsk
09/18/2012	(Russia) Semyon Varlamov (G)	(from) Colorado Avalanche	(to) Lokomotiv Yaroslavl
09/19/2012	(Russia) Alexander Ovechkin (LW)	(from) Washington Capitals	(to) Dynamo Moscow
09/19/2012	(Russia) Pavel Datsyuk (C)	(from) Detroit Red Wings	(to) CSKA Moscow
09/19/2012	(Russia) Ilya Bryzgalov (G)	(from) Philadelphia Flyers	(to) CSKA Moscow
09/20/2012	(Czech Republic) Jiří Hudler (LW)	(from) Calgary Flames	(to) Lev Prague
09/20/2012	(Kazakhstan) Nik Antropov (C)	(from) Winnipeg Jets	(to) Barys Astana
09/20/2012	(Russia) Artem Anisimov (C)	(from) Columbus Blue Jackets	(to) Lokomotiv Yaroslavl
09/21/2012	(Belarus) Mikhail Grabovski (C)	(from) Toronto Maple Leafs	(to) CSKA Moscow
09/21/2012	(Russia) Sergei Bobrovsky (G)	(from) Columbus Blue Jackets	(to) SKA Saint Petersburg
9/21/2012	(Russia) Vladimir Tarasenko (RW)	(from) St. Louis Blues	(to) SKA Saint Petersburg
09/24/2012	(Russia) Dmitri Kulikov (D)	(from) Florida Panthers	(to) Lokomotiv Yaroslavl
09/25/2012	(Russia) Nikita Nikitin (D)	(from) Columbus Blue Jackets	(to) Avangard Omsk
09/25/2012	(Finland) Pekka Rinne (G)	(from) Nashville Predators	(to) Dinamo Minsk
09/27/2012	(Russia) Anton Babchuk (D)	(from) Calgary Flames	(to) HC Donbass
09/27/2012	(Slovakia) Andrej Sekera (D)	(from) Buffalo Sabres	(to) Slovan Bratislava
09/28/2012	(Sweden) Victor Hedman (D)	(from) Tampa Bay Lightning	(to) Barys Astana
09/28/2012	(Canada) Evander Kane (LW)	(from) Winnipeg Jets	(to) Dinamo Minsk
10/02/2012	(Slovakia) Zdeno Chára (D)	(from) Boston Bruins	(to) Lev Prague
10/02/2012	(Sweden) Tom Wandell (LW)	(from) Dallas Stars	(to) Severstal Cherepovets
10/03/2012	(Russia) Andrei Markov (D)	(from) Montreal Canadiens	(to) Vityaz Chekhov
10/04/2012	(Russia) Anton Volchenkov (D)	(from) New Jersey Devils	(to) Torpedo Nizhny Novgorod
10/05/2012	(United States) Joe Pavelski (C)	(from) San Jose Sharks	(to) Dinamo Minsk
10/07/2012	(Belarus) Sergei Kostitsyn (LW)	(from) Nashville Predators	(to) Avangard Omsk
10/11/2012	(United States) Ryan McDonagh (D)	(from) New York Rangers	(to) Dynamo Moscow
10/19/2012	(Sweden) Nicklas Bäckström (C)	(from) Washington Capitals	(to) Dynamo Moscow
10/30/2012	(Canada) Joffrey Lupul (RW)	(from) Toronto Maple Leafs	(to) Avtomobilist Yekaterinburg
11/20/2012	(Sweden) Viktor Stålberg (RW)	(from) Chicago Blackhawks	(to) Atlant Moscow Oblast
12/07/2012	(Canada) Ryan O'Reilly (C)	(from) Colorado Avalanche	(to) Metallurg Magnitogorsk
01/04/2013	(Canada) Kris Letang (D)	(from) Pittsburgh Penguins	(to) SKA Saint Petersburg

==== Proposed matches in New York ====
Two regular season games between Dynamo Moscow and SKA Saint Petersburg were planned to take place at the new Barclays Center in Brooklyn, New York in January 2013. However, the KHL reverted this decision in October 2012 and thus these matches were played in Russia.

==== All-star game ====
The 5th KHL all-star game was played on 13 January 2013 in Chelyabinsk, with Team East, captained by Aleksey Morozov, winning 18–11 over Team West, captained by Ilya Kovalchuk.

=== League standings ===
Source: KHL.ru

Points are awarded as follows:

- 3 Points for a win in regulation ("W")
- 2 Points for a win in overtime ("OTW") or a penalty shootout ("SOW")
- 1 Point for a loss in overtime ("OTL") or a penalty shootout ("SOL")
- 0 Points for a loss in regulation ("L")

The conference standings determine the seedings for the playoffs. The first two places in each conference are reserved for the division winners.

==== Western Conference ====
R		Div	GP	W	OTW	SOW	SOL	OTL	L	GF	GA	Pts
1	c – SKA Saint Petersburg	BOB	52	36	1	1	2	1	11	182	116	115
2	y – CSKA Moscow	TAR	52	23	5	8	1	0	15	151	109	96
3	Dynamo Moscow	BOB	52	27	3	6	1	1	14	150	115	101
4	Lokomotiv Yaroslavl	TAR	52	24	2	8	0	0	18	131	121	92
5	Severstal Cherepovets	TAR	52	21	1	6	3	5	16	137	117	85
6	Slovan Bratislava	BOB	52	17	3	8	5	0	19	124	127	78
7	Lev Prague	BOB	52	23	0	1	2	3	23	132	133	76
8	Atlant Moscow Oblast	TAR	52	19	1	3	4	4	21	137	141	73
9	HC Donbass	BOB	52	17	2	5	6	1	21	134	142	72
10	Dinamo Minsk	TAR	52	18	5	1	2	3	23	125	148	71
11	Torpedo Nizhny Novgorod	TAR	52	19	0	2	4	4	23	142	146	69
12	Vityaz Chekhov	BOB	52	11	1	6	6	2	26	119	151	55
13	Spartak Moscow	TAR	52	11	4	2	5	2	28	106	151	52
14	Dinamo Riga	BOB	52	13	2	2	2	2	31	109	151	51

y – Won division; c – Won Continental Cup (best record in KHL);
BOB – Bobrov Division, TAR – Tarasov Division

Source: khl.ru

==== Eastern Conference ====
R		Div	GP	W	OTW	SOW	SOL	OTL	L	GF	GA	Pts
1	z – Ak Bars Kazan	KHA	52	28	1	5	5	3	10	157	112	104
2	y – Avangard Omsk	CHE	52	26	6	3	4	2	11	149	121	102
3	Traktor Chelyabinsk	KHA	52	28	0	3	6	2	13	152	120	98
4	Metallurg Magnitogorsk	KHA	52	27	0	0	7	5	13	167	121	93
5	Salavat Yulaev Ufa	CHE	52	24	2	3	6	0	17	148	140	88
6	Barys Astana	CHE	52	23	3	2	2	4	18	175	161	85
7	Sibir Novosibirsk	CHE	52	21	1	5	4	3	17	124	119	84
8	Neftekhimik Nizhnekamsk	KHA	52	17	5	5	4	2	19	144	150	77
9	Yugra Khanty-Mansiysk	KHA	52	19	4	3	3	0	23	153	163	74
10	Metallurg Novokuznetsk	CHE	52	15	3	1	3	2	28	132	177	58
11	Amur Khabarovsk	CHE	52	11	1	4	1	0	35	115	167	44
12	Avtomobilist Yekaterinburg	KHA	52	7	0	1	7	5	32	104	180	35

y – Won division; z – Won conference (and division);
CHE – Chernyshev Division, KHA – Kharlamov Division

Source: khl.ru

=== Player statistics ===
==== Scoring leaders ====
Updated on 17 February 2013. Source: khl.ru

GP = Games played; G = Goals; A = Assists; Pts = Points; +/– = P Plus–minus; PIM = Penalty minutes

Player	Team	GP	G	A	Pts	+/–	PIM
Sergei Mozyakin	Metallurg Magnitogorsk	48	35	41	76	+21	6
Alexander Radulov	CSKA Moscow	48	22	46	68	+12	86
Evgeni Malkin	Metallurg Magnitogorsk	37	23	42	65	+23	58
Patrick Thoresen	SKA Saint Petersburg	52	21	30	51	+17	49
Jori Lehterä	Sibir Novosibirsk	52	17	31	48	+18	48
Evgeny Kuznetsov	Traktor Chelyabinsk	51	19	25	44	–1	42
Dmitri Kagarlitsky	HC Donbass	51	14	30	44	–5	12
Mikhail Varnakov	Torpedo Nizhny Novgorod	51	22	21	43	+9	62
Nikolay Zherdev	Atlant Moscow Oblast	50	15	28	43	–7	29
Dmitri Makarov	Torpedo Nizhny Novgorod	52	13	30	43	–2	14

==== Leading goaltenders ====
Updated on 17 February 2013. Source: khl.ru

GP = Games played; Min = Minutes played; W = Wins; L = Losses; SOP = Shootouts played; GA = Goals against; SO = Shutouts; SV% = Save percentage; GAA = Goals against average

Player	Team	GP	Min	W	L	SOP	GA	SO	SV%	GAA
Rastislav Staňa	CSKA Moscow	34	1944:58	18	6	2	57	4	.934	1.76
Lars Haugen	Dinamo Minsk	22	1289:29	13	7	1	39	2	.933	1.81
Alexander Eremenko	Dynamo Moscow	30	1783:44	17	7	6	55	5	.931	1.85
Stanislav Galimov	Atlant Moscow Oblast	25	1389:58	14	6	3	45	4	.943	1.94
Sergei Bobrovsky	SKA Saint Petersburg	24	1419:36	18	3	2	46	4	.932	1.94

== Playoffs ==
The playoffs started on 20 February 2013 with the top eight teams from both conferences and ended on 17 April with the last game of the Gagarin Cup final.

During the first three rounds home ice was determined by seeding number within the Conference, not position on the bracket. In the Finals the team with better seeding number had home ice advantage. If the seeding numbers were equal, the regular season record was taken into account.

=== Bracket ===
Conference Quarterfinals	Conference Semifinals
1	(Russia) Ak Bars	4
8	(Russia) Neftekhimik	0
1	(Russia) Ak Bars	4
5	(Russia) Salavat Yulaev	3
2	(Russia) Avangard	4
7	(Russia) Sibir	3
Eastern Conference
3	(Russia) Traktor	4
6	(Kazakhstan) Barys	3
2	(Russia) Avangard	1
3	(Russia) Traktor	4
4	(Russia) Metallurg Mg	3
5	(Russia) Salavat Yulaev	4
1	(Russia) SKA	4
8	(Russia) Atlant	1
1	(Russia) SKA	4
5	(Russia) Severstal	0
2	(Russia) CSKA	4
7	(Czech Republic) Lev	0
Western Conference
3	(Russia) Dynamo Msk	4
6	(Slovakia) Slovan	0
2	(Russia) CSKA	1
3	(Russia) Dynamo Msk	4
4	(Russia) Lokomotiv	2
5	(Russia) Severstal	4

Conference Finals
1	(Russia) Ak Bars	3
3	(Russia) Traktor	4
1	(Russia) SKA	2
3	(Russia) Dynamo Msk	4

Gagarin Cup Finals
3	(Russia) Traktor	2
3	(Russia) Dynamo Msk	4

=== Player statistics ===
==== Playoff scoring leaders ====
GP = Games played; G = Goals; A = Assists; Pts = Points; +/– = P Plus–minus; PIM = Penalty minutes

Player	Team	GP	G	A	Pts	+/–	PIM
Petri Kontiola	Traktor Chelyabinsk	25	10	9	19	+10	12
Viktor Tikhonov	SKA Saint Petersburg	15	10	8	18	+11	20
Jakub Petružálek	Dynamo Moscow	19	9	7	16	+4	4
Tony Mårtensson	SKA Saint Petersburg	15	6	10	16	+8	8
Denis Kokarev	Dynamo Moscow	18	1	15	16	+11	0

==== Playoff leading goaltenders ====
Updated on 17 April 2013. Source: khl.ru

GP = Games played; Min = Minutes played; W = Wins; L = Losses; SOL = Shootout losses; GA = Goals against; SO = Shutouts; SV% = Save percentage; GAA = Goals against average

Player	Team	GP	Min	W	L	SOP	GA	SO	SV%	GAA
Alexander Eremenko	Dynamo Moscow	21	1309:24	16	5	0	38	3	93.4	1.74
Rastislav Staňa	CSKA Moscow	9	551:12	5	4	0	16	0	93.9	1.74
Konstantin Barulin	Ak Bars Kazan	18	1233:41	11	7	0	36	2	94.1	1.75
Ilya Ezhov	SKA Saint Petersburg	11	645:27	6	4	0	19	2	93.3	1.77
Jeff Glass	Sibir Novosibirsk	7	406:47	3	4	0	12	2	94.1	1.77

== Nadezhda Cup ==
Preliminary round

- Dinamo Riga vs Torpedo Nizhny Novgorod(4–1, 3–4, Riga wins extra overtime)
- Spartak Moscow vs Vityaz Chekhov (2–2, 1–0)

Quarterfinals
W14	Dinamo Riga	2
W9	HC Donbass	2
W13	Spartak Moscow	0
W10	Dinamo Minsk	3
E12	Avtomobilist Yekaterinburg	2
E9	Yugra Khanty-Mansiysk	2
E11	Amur Khabarovsk	3
E10	Metallurg Novokuznetsk	1

Semifinals
W14	Dinamo Riga	3
W10	Dinamo Minsk	0
E12	Avtomobilist Yekaterinburg	2
E11	Amur Khabarovsk	2

Final
W14	Dinamo Riga	3
E11	Amur Khabarovsk	1

== Final standings ==
Rank	Team
1	(Russia) Dynamo Moscow
2	(Russia) Traktor Chelyabinsk
3	(Russia) SKA Saint Petersburg
4	(Russia) Ak Bars Kazan
5	(Russia) Avangard Omsk
6	(Russia) CSKA Moscow
7	(Russia) Salavat Yulaev Ufa
8	(Russia) Severstal Cherepovets
9	(Russia) Metallurg Magnitogorsk
10	(Russia) Lokomotiv Yaroslavl
11	(Kazakhstan) Barys Astana
12	(Russia) Sibir Novosibirsk
13	(Slovakia) Slovan Bratislava
14	(Russia) Neftekhimik Nizhnekamsk
15	(Czech Republic) Lev Prague
16	(Russia) Atlant Moscow Oblast
17	(Russia) Yugra Khanty-Mansiysk
18	(Ukraine) HC Donbass
19	(Belarus) Dinamo Minsk
20	(Russia) Torpedo Nizhny Novgorod
21	(Russia) Metallurg Novokuznetsk
22	(Russia) Vityaz Chekhov
23	(Russia) Spartak Moscow
24	(Latvia) Dinamo Riga
25	(Russia) Amur Khabarovsk
26	(Russia) Avtomobilist Yekaterinburg

== Awards ==
=== Players of the Month ===
Best KHL players of each month.

Month	Goaltender	Defense	Forward	Rookie
September	(Russia) Konstantin Barulin (Ak Bars)	(Russia) Yevgeny Medvedev (Ak Bars)	(Finland) Jori Lehterä (Sibir)	(Russia) Daniil Apalkov (Lokomotiv)
October	(Russia) Alexander Eremenko (Dynamo Moscow)	(Russia) Anton Belov (Avangard)	(Russia) Ilya Kovalchuk (SKA)	(Russia) Nail Yakupov (Neftekhimik)
November	(Slovakia) Rastislav Staňa (CSKA)	(Sweden) Victor Hedman (Barys)	(Russia) Artem Anisimov (Lokomotiv)	(Russia) Viktor Antipin (Magnitogorsk)
December	(Finland) Karri Rämö (Avangard)	(Russia) Sergei Gonchar (Magnitogorsk)	(Russia) Evgeni Malkin (Magnitogorsk)	(Russia) Alexander Sharychenkov (Dynamo Moscow)
January	(Russia) Vasiliy Koshechkin (Severstal)	(Russia) Dmitri Kalinin (SKA)	(Russia) Igor Skorokhodov (Yugra)	(Russia) Valeri Nichushkin (Traktor)
February	(Russia) Vasiliy Koshechkin (Severstal)	(Russia) Yakov Rylov (CSKA)	(Russia) Mikhail Varnakov (SKA)	(Russia) Valeri Nichushkin (Traktor)
March	(Canada) Michael Garnett (Traktor)	(Slovakia) Dominik Graňák (Dynamo Moscow)	(Russia) Viktor Tikhonov (SKA)	(Russia) Valeri Nichushkin (Traktor)

=== KHL Awards ===
On 22 May 2013, the KHL held their annual award ceremony. A total of 23 different awards were handed out to teams, players, officials and media. The most important trophies are listed in the table below.

Golden Stick Award (regular season MVP)	(Russia) Sergei Mozyakin (Magintogorsk)
Best coach	(Latvia) Oļegs Znaroks (Dynamo Msc)
Alexei Cherepanov Award (best rookie)	(Russia) Valeri Nichushkin (Traktor)

The league also awarded six "Golden Helmets" for the members of the all-star team:

Forwards	(Russia) Alexander Radulov; SKA Saint Petersburg	(Russia) Viktor Tikhonov; SKA Saint Petersburg	(Russia) Sergei Mozyakin; Metallurg Magnitogorsk
Defense	(Russia) Ilya Nikulin; Ak Bars Kazan		(Russia) Ilya Gorokhov; Dynamo Moscow
Goalie	(Russia) Alexander Eremenko; Dynamo Moscow		
