= 2016 Gagarin Cup playoffs =

Tournament details
- Dates: February 21–April 19, 2016
- Teams: 16

Final positions
- Champions: Metallurg Magnitogorsk
- Runners-up: CSKA Moscow

Tournament statistics
- Scoring leader(s): Sergei Mozyakin (Metallurg) (25 points)

Awards
- MVP: Sergei Mozyakin (Metallurg)

The 2016 Gagarin Cup playoffs of the Kontinental Hockey League (KHL) began on February 21, 2016, with the top eight teams from each of the conferences, following the conclusion of the 2015–16 KHL regular season.

== Playoff seeds ==
After the regular season, the standard 16 teams qualified for the playoffs. The Western Conference regular season winners and Continental Cup winners are CSKA Moscow with 127 points. Avangard Omsk are the Eastern Conference regular season winners with 106 points.

== Draw ==
The playoffs started on February 21, 2016, with the top eight teams from each of the conferences and ended with the last game of the Gagarin Cup final on April 19, 2016.

Conference Quarterfinals	Conference Semifinals
1	(Russia) Avangard	4
8	(Russia) Neftekhimik	0
1	(Russia) Avangard	3
4	(Russia) Salavat Yulaev	4
2	(Russia) Metallurg Mg	4
7	(Russia) Avtomobilist	2
Eastern Conference
3	(Russia) Sibir	4
6	(Russia) Admiral	1
2	(Russia) Metallurg Mg	4
3	(Russia) Sibir	1
4	(Russia) Salavat Yulaev	4
5	(Russia) Ak Bars	3
1	(Russia) CSKA	4
8	(Slovakia) Slovan	0
1	(Russia) CSKA	4
7	(Russia) Torpedo	1
2	(Finland) Jokerit	2
7	(Russia) Torpedo	4
Western Conference
3	(Russia) Lokomotiv	1
6	(Russia) SKA	4
5	(Russia) Dynamo Msk	2
6	(Russia) SKA	4
4	(Russia) HC Sochi	0
5	(Russia) Dynamo Msk	4

Conference Finals
4	(Russia) Salavat Yulaev	1
2	(Russia) Metallurg Mg	4
1	(Russia) CSKA	4
6	(Russia) SKA	0

Gagarin Cup Finals
2	(Russia) Metallurg Mg	4
1	(Russia) CSKA	3

== Conference Quarterfinals ==
=== Eastern Conference ===
==== (1) Avangard Omsk vs. (8) HC Neftekhimik Nizhnekamsk ====
February 22	Avangard Omsk	2 – 1	HC Neftekhimik Nizhnekamsk	G-Drive Arena
No scoring		First period	No scoring
04:12 – Artur Lauta (1); 15:00 – Alexander Perezhogin (1)		Second period	Nikita Shchitov (1) – 09:31
No scoring		Third period	No scoring
Dominik Furch 30 saves / 31 shots		Goalie stats	Alexander Sudnitsin 32 saves / 34 shots

February 24	Avangard Omsk	4 – 2	HC Neftekhimik Nizhnekamsk	G-Drive Arena
04:52 – Yury Petrov (1)		First period	No scoring
09:53 – Ilya Zubov (1); 10:59 – pp – Martin Erat (1)		Second period	Andrei Sergeyev (1) – pp – 10:59
19:56 – pp – en – Nikolai Lemtyugov (1)		Third period	Jeff Taffe (1) – pp – 04:12
Dominik Furch 24 saves / 26 shots		Goalie stats	Alexander Sudnitsin 31 saves / 34 shots

February 26	HC Neftekhimik Nizhnekamsk	1 – 2	Avangard Omsk	Neftekhimik Ice Palace
No scoring		First period	Anton Burdasov (1) – 19:00
No scoring		Second period	Yuri Alexandrov (1) – 01:22
09:50 – Bogdan Yakimov (1)		Third period	No scoring
Alexander Sudnitsin 20 saves / 22 shots		Goalie stats	Dominik Furch 46 saves / 47 shots

February 28	HC Neftekhimik Nizhnekamsk	2 – 3	3OT	Avangard Omsk	Neftekhimik Ice Palace
02:14 – Andrei Sergeyev (2); 16:39 – Evgeny Grigorenko (1)		First period		No scoring
No scoring		Second period		Yuri Alexandrov (2) – 14:59
No scoring		Third period		Alexander Perezhogin (2) – 06:59
No scoring		Third overtime period		Denis Parshin (1) – 02:39
Alexander Sudnitsin 46 saves / 49 shots		Goalie stats		Dominik Furch 51 saves / 53 shots

Omsk wins series 4 – 0

==== (2) Metallurg Magnitogorsk vs. (7) Avtomobilist Yekaterinburg ====
February 22	Metallurg Magnitogorsk	1 – 2	Avtomobilist Yekaterinburg	Arena Metallurg
02:08 – pp – Alexander Semin (1)		First period	Alexander Pankov (1) – 05:05
No scoring		Second period	Alexander Pankov (2) – 05:54
No scoring		Third period	No scoring
Ilya Samsonov 25 saves / 27 shots		Goalie stats	Jakub Kovář 27 saves / 28 shots

February 24	Metallurg Magnitogorsk	2 – 0	Avtomobilist Yekaterinburg	Arena Metallurg
No scoring		First period	No scoring
No scoring		Second period	No scoring
03:17 – Oskar Osala (1); 19:58 – en – Jan Kovář (1)		Third period	No scoring
Vasily Koshechkin 20 saves / 20 shots		Goalie stats	Igor Ustinsky 36 saves / 37 shots

February 26	Avtomobilist Yekaterinburg	0 – 6	Metallurg Magnitogorsk	KRK Uralets
No scoring		First period	Alexander Semin (2) – 12:23; Yaroslav Kosov (1) – 13:01; Oskar Osala (2) – 13:01; Oskar Osala (3) – 15:17
No scoring		Second period	Yaroslav Kosov (2) – 00:47; Denis Platonov (1) – 19:47
No scoring		Third period	Oskar Osala (4) – sh – en – 19:32
Jakub Kovář 12 saves / 15 shots Igor Ustinsky 24 saves / 26 shots		Goalie stats	Vasily Koshechkin 29 saves / 29 shots

February 28	Avtomobilist Yekaterinburg	3 – 1	Metallurg Magnitogorsk	KRK Uralets
No scoring		First period	No scoring
05:59 – pp – Alexei Vasilevsky (1); 09:57 – pp – Artyom Gareyev (1); 16:53 – pp – Alexei Vasilevsky (2)		Second period	02:01 – pp – Alexander Semin (3)
No scoring		Third period	No scoring
Igor Ustinsky 33 saves / 34 shots		Goalie stats	Ilya Samsonov 25 saves / 28 shots

March 1	Metallurg Magnitogorsk	4 – 2	Avtomobilist Yekaterinburg	Arena Metallurg
19:01 – pp – Viktor Antipin (1)		First period	Yegor Zhuravlyov (1) – 05:39
11:07 – Sergei Mozyakin (1)		Second period	No scoring
08:46 – Danis Zaripov (1); 19:59 – en – Denis Platonov (2)		Third period	Alexei Vasilevsky (3) – pp – 11:57
Ilya Samsonov 23 saves / 25 shots		Goalie stats	Igor Ustinsky 25 saves / 28 shots

March 3	Avtomobilist Yekaterinburg	2 – 5	Metallurg Magnitogorsk	KRK Uralets
12:00 – pp – Anatoli Golyshev (1); 17:06 – Sergei Yemelin (1)		First period	No scoring
No scoring		Second period	Sergei Tereschenko (1) – 10:40
No scoring		Third period	Bogdan Potekhin (1) – 02:17; Jan Kovář (2) – pp – 06:57; Tomáš Filippi (1) – 13:28; Tomáš Filippi (2) – en – 18:13
Igor Ustinsky 26 saves / 30 shots		Goalie stats	Ilya Samsonov 20 saves / 22 shots

Magnitogorsk wins series 4 – 2

==== (3) HC Sibir Novosibirsk vs. (6) Admiral Vladivostok ====
February 22	HC Sibir Novosibirsk	4 – 2	Admiral Vladivostok	Ice Sports Palace Sibir
18:02 – Ivan Vereshchagin (1)		First period	No scoring
01:22 – Viktor Bobrov (1); 06:19 – pp – Stepan Sannikov (1)		Second period	Alexander Kuznetsov (1) – 03:20; Konstantin Makarov (1) – pp – 09:11
00:30 – pp – Konstantin Alexeev (1)		Third period	No scoring
Alexander Salák 30 saves / 32 shots		Goalie stats	Ivan Nalimov 28 saves / 32 shots

February 24	HC Sibir Novosibirsk	4 – 0	Admiral Vladivostok	Ice Sports Palace Sibir
08:19 – Viktor Bobrov (2)		First period	No scoring
06:14 – Calle Ridderwall (1); 08:38 – pp – Sergei Shumakov (1)		Second period	No scoring
17:26 – en – Maxim Shalunov (1)		Third period	No scoring
Alexander Salák 36 saves / 36 shots		Goalie stats	Ivan Nalimov 34 saves / 37 shots

February 26	Admiral Vladivostok	1 – 3	HC Sibir Novosibirsk	Fetisov Arena
14:14 – pp – Konstantin Makarov (2)		First period	Konstantin Okulov (1) – 13:20
No scoring		Second period	Sergei Shumakov (2) – 11:39; Vladislav Naumov (1) – 18:00
No scoring		Third period	No scoring
Ivan Nalimov 20 saves / 23 shots		Goalie stats	Alexander Salák 21 saves / 22 shots

February 28	Admiral Vladivostok	2 – 0	HC Sibir Novosibirsk	Fetisov Arena
No scoring		First period	No scoring
05:07 – pp – Konstantin Makarov (3)		Second period	No scoring
19:06 – en – Egor Dugin (1)		Third period	No scoring
Ivan Nalimov 22 saves / 22 shots		Goalie stats	Alexander Salák 15 saves / 16 shots

March 1	HC Sibir Novosibirsk	4 – 0	Admiral Vladivostok	Ice Sports Palace Sibir
No scoring		First period	No scoring
01:05 – Damir Zhafyarov (1); 04:41 – Sergei Shumakov (3); 05:21 – Artyom Voroshilo (1)		Second period	No scoring
15:02 – Konstantin Okulov (2)		Third period	No scoring
Alexander Salák 52 saves / 52 shots		Goalie stats	Igor Bobkov 25 saves / 29 shots

Novosibirsk wins series 4 – 1

==== (4) Salavat Yulaev Ufa vs. (5) Ak Bars Kazan ====
February 22	Salavat Yulaev Ufa	4 – 1	Ak Bars Kazan	Ufa Arena
14:14 – Igor Grigorenko (1)		First period	No scoring
18:22 – pp – Igor Grigorenko (2)		Second period	No scoring
19:00 – en – Teemu Hartikainen (1); 19:34 – Denis Khlystov (1)		Third period	Dmitri Obukhov (1) – 19:52
Niklas Svedberg 22 saves / 23 shots		Goalie stats	Stanislav Galimov 26 saves / 29 shots

February 24	Salavat Yulaev Ufa	5 – 2	Ak Bars Kazan	Ufa Arena
12:11 – pp – Alexander Loginov (1); 13:47 – Denis Bodrov (1)		First period	No scoring
05:53 – Oleg Saprykin (1); 13:22 – Nikolai Prokhorkin (1)		Second period	Artyom Lukoyanov (1) – 00:47; Ryan Wilson (1) – 11:14
12:22 – Denis Khlystov (2)		Third period	No scoring
Niklas Svedberg 31 saves / 33 shots		Goalie stats	Stanislav Galimov 26 saves / 31 shots

February 26	Ak Bars Kazan	3 – 0	Salavat Yulaev Ufa	TatNeft Arena
17:22 – Vladimir Tkachyov (1)		First period	No scoring
02:42 – Dmitry Arkhipov (1); 13:07 – Artyom Lukoyanov (2)		Second period	No scoring
No scoring		Third period	No scoring
Stanislav Galimov 34 saves / 34 shots		Goalie stats	Niklas Svedberg 22 saves / 25 shots

February 28	Ak Bars Kazan	1 – 4	Salavat Yulaev Ufa	TatNeft Arena
No scoring		First period	Linus Omark (1) – pp – 01:37; Sergei Soin (1) – 10:26
No scoring		Second period	Andreas Engqvist (1) – pp – 19:12
10:21 – pp – Albert Yarullin (1)		Third period	Anton Lazarev (1) – en – 19:05
Stanislav Galimov 21 saves / 24 shots		Goalie stats	Niklas Svedberg 32 saves / 33 shots

March 1	Salavat Yulaev Ufa	4 – 3	Ak Bars Kazan	Ufa Arena
03:56 – Linus Omark (2)		First period	Denis Golubev (1) – 15:15; Albert Yarullin (2) – pp – 16:01
05:23 – pp – Linus Omark (3); 15:14 – pp – Justin Azevedo (1)		Second period	No scoring
09:36 – Anton Lazarev (2)		Third period	Vladimir Tkachyov (2) – 09:36
Niklas Svedberg 23 saves / 27 shots		Goalie stats	Emil Garipov 23 saves / 26 shots

March 3	Ak Bars Kazan	8 – 0	Salavat Yulaev Ufa	TatNeft Arena
15:01 – Vladimir Tkachyov (3)		First period	No scoring
04:27 – Vladimir Tkachyov (4); 05:38 – Artyom Lukoyanov (3); 11:13 – pp – Ryan Wilson (2)		Second period	No scoring
04:29 – pp – Vladimir Tkachyov (5); 17:38 – Denis Golubev (2); 18:03 – Fyodor Malykhin (1)		Third period	No scoring
Emil Garipov 25 saves / 25 shots		Goalie stats	Niklas Svedberg 16 saves / 20 shots Vladimir Sokhatsky 16 saves / 20 shots

March 5	Salavat Yulaev Ufa	3 – 2	Ak Bars Kazan	Ufa Arena
01:05 – Enver Lisin (1); 15:09 – Maxim Goncharov (1)		First period	Dmitry Arkhipov (2) – 00:38
No scoring		Second period	Dmitry Arkhipov (3) – 18:43
17:57 – Dmitri Obukhov (2)		Third period	No scoring
Niklas Svedberg 28 saves / 30 shots		Goalie stats	Emil Garipov 23 saves / 26 shots

Ufa wins series 4 – 3

==== (1) HC CSKA Moscow vs. (8) HC Slovan Bratislava ====
February 21	HC CSKA Moscow	2 – 0	HC Slovan Bratislava	CSKA Ice Palace
11:47 – Kirill Petrov (1); 14:16 – pp – Geoff Platt (1)		First period	No scoring
No scoring		Second period	No scoring
No scoring		Third period	No scoring
Ilya Sorokin 24 saves / 24 shots		Goalie stats	Barry Brust 25 saves / 27 shots

February 23	HC CSKA Moscow	3 – 2	OT	HC Slovan Bratislava	CSKA Ice Palace
No scoring		First period		Václav Nedorost (1) – pp – 13:20
No scoring		Second period		Tomáš Starosta (1) – 19:33
04:08 – Kirill Petrov (2); 11:23 – Stéphane Da Costa (1)		Third period		No scoring
02:31 – Antti Pihlström (1)		First overtime period		No scoring
Ilya Sorokin 29 saves / 31 shots		Goalie stats		Barry Brust 30 saves / 33 shots

February 25	HC Slovan Bratislava	1 – 2	HC CSKA Moscow	Tipos aréna
12:58 – Marek Viedenský (1)		First period	No scoring
No scoring		Second period	No scoring
No scoring		Third period	Kirill Petrov (3) – 15:40; Stéphane Da Costa (2) – pp – 19:15
Barry Brust 26 saves / 28 shots		Goalie stats	Ilya Sorokin 25 saves / 26 shots

February 27	HC Slovan Bratislava	1 – 3	HC CSKA Moscow	Tipos aréna
12:49 – Tomáš Surový (1)		First period	No scoring
No scoring		Second period	No scoring
No scoring		Third period	Alexander Radulov (1) – 02:52; Stéphane Da Costa (3) – 05:52; Nikita Zaitsev (1) – en – 19:41
Barry Brust 35 saves / 37 shots		Goalie stats	Ilya Sorokin 16 saves / 17 shots

CSKA wins series 4 – 0

==== (2) Jokerit vs. (7) Torpedo Nizhny Novgorod ====
February 21	Jokerit	4 – 6	Torpedo Nizhny Novgorod	Helsinki Ice Hall
No scoring		First period	Nikolai Zherdev (1) – 14:50; Nikolai Zherdev (2) – 16:56
01:20 – Jesse Joensuu (1); 05:08 – Niklas Hagman (1); 12:28 – Jesse Joensuu (2)		Second period	Kaspars Daugaviņš (1) – 04:51
13:07 – Peter Regin (1)		Third period	Alexander Frolov (1) – 09:10; Alexei Sopin (1) – 12:51; Vyacheslav Kulyomin (1) – pp – en – 19:56
Henrik Karlsson 26 saves / 31 shots		Goalie stats	Ilya Proskuryakov 26 saves / 30 shots

February 23	Jokerit	4 – 3	Torpedo Nizhny Novgorod	Helsinki Ice Hall
13:07 – Niko Kapanen (1)		First period	Sergei Kostitsyn (1) – 12:46
No scoring		Second period	Nikolai Zherdev (3) – 01:05
06:50 – pp – Philip Larsen (1); 07:40 – pp – Ville Lajunen (1); 18:56 – en – Brandon Kozun (1)		Third period	Alexei Potapov (1) – 19:50
Henrik Karlsson 13 saves / 16 shots		Goalie stats	Ilya Proskuryakov 31 saves / 34 shots

February 25	Torpedo Nizhny Novgorod	1 – 0	Jokerit	Trade Union Sport Palace
08:57 – pp – Artyom Alyayev (1)		First period	No scoring
No scoring		Second period	No scoring
No scoring		Third period	No scoring
Ilya Proskuryakov 31 saves / 31 shots		Goalie stats	Henrik Karlsson 24 saves / 25 shots

February 27	Torpedo Nizhny Novgorod	3 – 2	OT	Jokerit	Trade Union Sport Palace
No scoring		First period		No scoring
15:54 – pp – Evgeny Mozer (1)		Second period		Philip Larsen (2) – 01:58; Philip Larsen (3) – pp – 09:34
03:43 – pp – Dmitri Semin (1)		Third period		No scoring
03:41 – pp – Kaspars Daugaviņš (2)		First overtime period		No scoring
Ilya Proskuryakov 24 saves / 26 shots		Goalie stats		Henrik Karlsson 28 saves / 31 shots

February 29	Jokerit	3 – 2	Torpedo Nizhny Novgorod	Helsinki Ice Hall
10:15 – pp – Peter Regin (2)		First period	No scoring
10:51 – pp – Brandon Kozun (2)		Second period	Vladimir Galuzin (1) – 06:20
06:22 – Niklas Hagman (2)		Third period	Alexei Potapov (2) – 19:08
Henrik Karlsson 29 saves / 31 shots		Goalie stats	Ilya Proskuryakov 21 saves / 24 shots

March 2	Torpedo Nizhny Novgorod	3 – 2	Jokerit	Trade Union Sport Palace
No scoring		First period	No scoring
12:35 – Maxim Osipov (1)		Second period	No scoring
10:14 – pp – Alexei Potapov (3); 15:53 – Vyacheslav Kulyomin (2)		Third period	Jesper Jensen Aabo (1) – 11:06; Brandon Kozun (3) – pp – 13:22
Ilya Proskuryakov 26 saves / 28 shots		Goalie stats	Henrik Karlsson 23 saves / 26 shots

Nizhny Novgorod wins series 4 – 2

==== (3) Lokomotiv Yaroslavl vs. (6) SKA Saint Petersburg ====
February 21	Lokomotiv Yaroslavl	3 – 2	OT	SKA Saint Petersburg	Arena 2000
No scoring		First period		Vadim Shipachyov (1) – pp – 15:19
04:57 – Denis Mosalyov (1); 19:19 – Vladislav Gavrikov (1)		Second period		Jarno Koskiranta (1) – pp – 10:48
No scoring		Third period		No scoring
14:56 – Jiří Novotný (1)		First overtime period		No scoring
Alexei Murygin 28 saves / 30 shots		Goalie stats		Mikko Koskinen 35 saves / 38 shots

February 23	Lokomotiv Yaroslavl	2 – 3	SKA Saint Petersburg	Arena 2000
No scoring		First period	Alexander Barabanov (1) – 14:39
No scoring		Second period	Sergei Shirokov (1) – 07:20; Jarno Koskiranta (2) – 16:49
00:31 – Daniil Apalkov (1); 05:14 – pp – Staffan Kronwall (1)		Third period	No scoring
Alexei Murygin 18 saves / 21 shots		Goalie stats	Mikko Koskinen 39 saves / 41 shots

February 25	SKA Saint Petersburg	3 – 0	Lokomotiv Yaroslavl	Ice Palace
14:17 – Sergei Shirokov (2)		First period	No scoring
05:56 – pp – Vadim Shipachyov (2)		Second period	No scoring
06:59 – Maxim Chudinov (1)		Third period	No scoring
Mikko Koskinen 29 saves / 29 shots		Goalie stats	Alexei Murygin 28 saves / 31 shots

February 27	SKA Saint Petersburg	1 – 0	Lokomotiv Yaroslavl	Ice Palace
No scoring		First period	No scoring
03:38 – pp – Nikita Gusev (1)		Second period	No scoring
No scoring		Third period	No scoring
Mikko Koskinen 25 saves / 25 shots		Goalie stats	Alexei Murygin 24 saves / 25 shots

February 29	Lokomotiv Yaroslavl	0 – 2	SKA Saint Petersburg	Arena 2000
No scoring		First period	Vadim Shipachyov (3) – pp – 15:04
No scoring		Second period	Pavel Buchnevich (1) – 16:04
No scoring		Third period	No scoring
Alexei Murygin 21 saves / 23 shots		Goalie stats	Mikko Koskinen 21 saves / 21 shots

Saint Petersburg wins series 4 – 1

==== (4) HC Sochi vs. (5) HC Dynamo Moscow ====
February 21	HC Sochi	1 – 4	HC Dynamo Moscow	Bolshoy Ice Dome
No scoring		First period	Juuso Hietanen (1) – pp – 13:47; Dmitri Vishnevsky (1) – 18:56
No scoring		Second period	Dmitri Vishnevsky (2) – pp – 18:48
18:35 – Yegor Morozov (1)		Third period	Ilya Shipov (1) – 15:19
Konstantin Barulin 28 saves / 32 shots		Goalie stats	Alexander Yeryomenko 31 saves / 32 shots

February 23	HC Sochi	2 – 3	HC Dynamo Moscow	Bolshoy Ice Dome
No scoring		First period	Daniil Tarasov (1) – 01:41
14:15 – Denis Kazionov (1)		Second period	Vladimir Bryukvin (1) – 09:02
16:28 – André Petersson (1)		Third period	Maxim Karpov (1) – 15:59
Konstantin Barulin 15 saves / 18 shots		Goalie stats	Alexander Yeryomenko 34 saves / 36 shots

February 25	HC Dynamo Moscow	3 – 0	HC Sochi	VTB Arena
19:18 – Ilya Shipov (2)		First period	No scoring
No scoring		Second period	No scoring
16:14 – pp – Ansel Galimov (1); 18:34 – Ansel Galimov (2)		Third period	No scoring
Alexander Yeryomenko 23 saves / 23 shots		Goalie stats	Konstantin Barulin 19 saves / 22 shots

February 27	HC Dynamo Moscow	1 – 0	2OT	HC Sochi	VTB Arena
No scoring		First period		No scoring
No scoring		Second period		No scoring
No scoring		Third period		No scoring
13:09 – pp – Alexei Tereshchenko (1)		Second overtime period		No scoring
Alexander Yeryomenko 44 saves / 44 shots		Goalie stats		Konstantin Barulin 36 saves / 37 shots

Moscow wins series 4 – 0

== Conference Semifinals ==
=== Eastern Conference ===
==== (1) Avangard Omsk vs. (4) Salavat Yulaev Ufa ====
March 8	Avangard Omsk	2 – 3	OT	Salavat Yulaev Ufa	G-Drive Arena
01:57 – Nikolai Lemtyugov (2)		First period		Maxim Mayorov (1) – 15:59
No scoring		Second period		No scoring
00:48 – Denis Parshin (2)		Third period		Linus Omark (4) – 11:14
No scoring		First overtime period		Sergei Soin (2) – 12:34
Dominik Furch 27 saves / 30 shots		Goalie stats		Niklas Svedberg 34 saves / 36 shots

March 10	Avangard Omsk	5 – 4	Salavat Yulaev Ufa	G-Drive Arena
09:40 – Anton Burdasov (2)		First period	Teemu Hartikainen (2) – pp – 13:44
05:01 – Alexander Perezhogin (3); 12:51 – Ilya Zubov (2); 14:36 – Artur Lauta (2); 18:50 – Alexander Perezhogin (4)		Second period	Ivan Vishnevskiy (1) – 10:29; Igor Grigorenko (3) – 15:26; Teemu Hartikainen (3) – 19:37
No scoring		Third period	No scoring
Dominik Furch 31 saves / 35 shots		Goalie stats	Niklas Svedberg 24 saves / 29 shots

March 12	Salavat Yulaev Ufa	3 – 1	Avangard Omsk	Ufa Arena
07:56 – Ivan Vishnevskiy (2)		First period	No scoring
12:30 – Teemu Hartikainen (3)		Second period	No scoring
19:50 – pp – en – Sami Lepistö (1)		Third period	Nikolai Lemtyugov (3) – 05:40
Niklas Svedberg 29 saves / 30 shots		Goalie stats	Dominik Furch 28 saves / 30 shots

March 14	Salavat Yulaev Ufa	2 – 1	Avangard Omsk	Ufa Arena
No scoring		First period	Pyotr Khokhryakov (1) – 07:36
18:16 – Sami Lepistö (2)		Second period	No scoring
16:51 – Linus Omark (5)		Third period	No scoring
Niklas Svedberg 18 saves / 19 shots		Goalie stats	Dominik Furch 32 saves / 34 shots

March 16	Avangard Omsk	3 – 2	Salavat Yulaev Ufa	G-Drive Arena
10:18 – pp – Ivan Lekomtsev (1)		First period	No scoring
14:08 – Ilya Zubov (3)		Second period	No scoring
03:40 – pp – Nikolai Lemtyugov (4)		Third period	Ivan Vishnevskiy (2) – pp – 09:59; Igor Grigorenko (4) – 15:57
Dominik Furch 27 saves / 29 shots		Goalie stats	Niklas Svedberg 16 saves / 19 shots

March 18	Salavat Yulaev Ufa	1 – 3	Avangard Omsk	Ufa Arena
No scoring		First period	No scoring
No scoring		Second period	Aleksandr Popov (1) – 00:29; Michal Kempný (1) – 05:25; Michal Kempný (2) – 15:59
13:24 – Andreas Engqvist (2)		Third period	No scoring
Niklas Svedberg 9 saves / 12 shots Vladimir Sokhatsky 6 saves / 6 shots		Goalie stats	Dominik Furch 31 saves / 32 shots

March 20	Avangard Omsk	1 – 2	Salavat Yulaev Ufa	G-Drive Arena
12:51 – Alexander Perezhogin (5)		First period	No scoring
No scoring		Second period	Sergei Soin (3) – 02:34; Maxim Mayorov (2) – 12:04
No scoring		Third period	No scoring
Dominik Furch 32 saves / 34 shots		Goalie stats	Niklas Svedberg 18 saves / 19 shots

Ufa wins series 4 – 3

==== (2) Metallurg Magnitogorsk vs. (3) Admiral Vladivostok ====
March 8	Metallurg Magnitogorsk	3 – 1	HC Sibir Novosibirsk	Arena Metallurg
03:48 – pp – Alexander Semin (4); 05:41 – pp – Sergei Mozyakin (2)		First period	No scoring
No scoring		Second period	Andrej Meszároš (1) – 10:30
19:00 – en – Alexander Semin (5)		Third period	No scoring
Vasily Koshechkin 30 saves / 31 shots		Goalie stats	Alexander Salák 25 saves / 27 shots

March 10	Metallurg Magnitogorsk	1 – 3	HC Sibir Novosibirsk	Arena Metallurg
No scoring		First period	Sergei Shumakov (4) – 16:15
No scoring		Second period	David Ullstrom (1) – pp – 01:08; Tomáš Vincour (1) – pp – 18:03
03:41 – pp – Danis Zaripov (2)		Third period	No scoring
Vasily Koshechkin 16 saves / 19 shots Ilya Samsonov 9 saves / 9 shots		Goalie stats	Alexander Salák 27 saves / 28 shots

March 12	HC Sibir Novosibirsk	1 – 5	Metallurg Magnitogorsk	Ice Sports Palace Sibir
No scoring		First period	Viktor Antipin (2) – pp – 13:45
01:20 – pp – Maxim Ignatovich (1)		Second period	Jan Kovář (3) – 00:29; Jan Kovář (4) – pp – 13:33; Bogdan Potekhin (2) – 14:37
No scoring		Third period	Sergei Mozyakin (3) – 05:21
Alexander Salák 22 saves / 27 shots Nikita Bespalov 3 saves / 3 shots		Goalie stats	Vasily Koshechkin 25 saves / 26 shots

March 14	HC Sibir Novosibirsk	3 – 4	OT	Metallurg Magnitogorsk	Ice Sports Palace Sibir
No scoring		First period		Danis Zaripov (3) – 11:44
16:04 – Oleg Gubin (1)		Second period		Tomáš Filippi (3) – 05:53
04:24 – Sergei Gimayev (1); 19:34 – Calle Ridderwall (2)		Third period		Wojtek Wolski (1) – 11:34
No scoring		First overtime period		Sergei Mozyakin (4) – 00:52
Alexander Salák 31 saves / 35 shots		Goalie stats		Vasily Koshechkin 34 saves / 37 shots

March 16	Metallurg Magnitogorsk	2 – 1	HC Sibir Novosibirsk	Arena Metallurg
04:44 – pp – Chris Lee (1); 07:46 – Sergei Mozyakin (5)		First period	No scoring
No scoring		Second period	No scoring
No scoring		Third period	Maxim Shalunov (2) – 08:47
Vasily Koshechkin 29 saves / 30 shots		Goalie stats	Nikita Bespalov 19 saves / 21 shots

Magnitogorsk wins series 4 – 1

==== (1) HC CSKA Moscow vs. (7) Torpedo Nizhny Novgorod ====
March 7	HC CSKA Moscow	1 – 2	Torpedo Nizhny Novgorod	CSKA Ice Palace
08:17 – pp – Alexander Radulov (2)		First period	Linus Videll (1) – pp – 03:58
No scoring		Second period	Yuri Sergiyenko (1) – 14:47
No scoring		Third period	No scoring
Ilya Sorokin 16 saves / 18 shots		Goalie stats	Ilya Proskuryakov 28 saves / 29 shots

March 9	HC CSKA Moscow	5 – 1	Torpedo Nizhny Novgorod	CSKA Ice Palace
05:10 – pp – Ivan Telegin (1); 17:25 – pp – Geoff Platt (2)		First period	No scoring
11:25 – Igor Ozhiganov (1); 13:45 – pp – Geoff Platt (3)		Second period	Stanislav Yegorshev (1) – pp – 07:27
04:07 – Vladimir Zharkov (1)		Third period	No scoring
Ilya Sorokin 18 saves / 19 shots		Goalie stats	Ilya Proskuryakov 23 saves / 27 shots Mikhail Biryukov 11 saves / 12 shots

March 11	Torpedo Nizhny Novgorod	1 – 3	HC CSKA Moscow	Trade Union Sport Palace
No scoring		First period	Stéphane Da Costa (4) – 08:13
No scoring		Second period	No scoring
07:19 – Alexander Budkin (1)		Third period	Denis Denisov (1) – 05:54; Evgeny Korotkov (1) – sh – en – 19:20
Ilya Proskuryakov 27 saves / 29 shots		Goalie stats	Ilya Sorokin 16 saves / 17 shots

March 13	Torpedo Nizhny Novgorod	3 – 5	HC CSKA Moscow	Trade Union Sport Palace
No scoring		First period	Antti Pihlstrom (1) – 08:01
00:29 – pp – Sergei Kostitsyn (2)		Second period	Igor Ozhiganov (2) – pp – 05:54; Kirill Petrov (4) – 06:59; Roman Lyubimov (1) – 14:37
11:24 – Alexei Sopin (2); 14:16 – Alexander Frolov (3)		Third period	Vladimir Zharkov (2) – en – 19:12
Ilya Proskuryakov 13 saves / 16 shots Mikhail Biryukov 11 saves / 12 shots		Goalie stats	Ilya Sorokin 17 saves / 20 shots

March 15	HC CSKA Moscow	3 – 2	Torpedo Nizhny Novgorod	CSKA Ice Palace
14:31 – Simon Hjalmarsson (1)		First period	Vyacheslav Kulyomin (3) – 03:54
No scoring		Second period	No scoring
02:40 – Roman Lyubimov (2); 09:15 – sh – Simon Hjalmarsson (2)		Third period	Kaspars Daugaviņš (3) – pp – 13:51
Ilya Sorokin 22 saves / 24 shots		Goalie stats	Mikhail Biryukov 32 saves / 35 shots

Moscow wins series 4 – 1

==== (5) HC Dynamo Moscow vs. (6) SKA Saint Petersburg ====
March 7	HC Dynamo Moscow	2 – 3	SKA Saint Petersburg	VTB Arena
No scoring		First period	Evgenii Dadonov (1) – pp – 10:54
00:42 – Andrei Mironov (1)		Second period	Evgenii Dadonov (2) – pp – 12:46
17:23 – pp – Daniil Tarasov (2)		Third period	Nikita Gusev (2) – pp – 10:23
Alexander Yeryomenko 23 saves / 26 shots		Goalie stats	Mikko Koskinen 28 saves / 30 shots

March 9	HC Dynamo Moscow	4 – 3	OT	SKA Saint Petersburg	VTB Arena
03:23 – Maxim Karpov (2); 12:32 – pp – Ilya Shipov (3)		First period		No scoring
04:06 – Vladimir Bryukvin (2)		Second period		Nikita Gusev (3) – 03:15; Ilya Kablukov (1) – 04:59; Vadim Shipachyov (4) – pp – 14:50
No scoring		Third period		No scoring
16:18 – pp – Aleksandr Osipov (1)		First overtime period		No scoring
Alexander Yeryomenko 32 saves / 35 shots		Goalie stats		Mikko Koskinen 39 saves / 43 shots

March 11	SKA Saint Petersburg	0 – 4	HC Dynamo Moscow	Ice Palace
No scoring		First period	Ivan Igumnov (1) – sh – 15:43
No scoring		Second period	Maxim Pestushko (1) – 03:12; Konstantin Gorovikov (1) – pp – 16:23
No scoring		Third period	Daniil Tarasov (3) – 17:20
Mikko Koskinen 22 saves / 26 shots		Goalie stats	Alexander Yeryomenko 34 saves / 34 shots

March 13	SKA Saint Petersburg	4 – 0	HC Dynamo Moscow	Ice Palace
02:45 – pp – Vadim Shipachyov (4)		First period	No scoring
10:39 – pp – Evgenii Dadonov (3); 17:59 – Vadim Shipachyov (5)		Second period	No scoring
19:49 – pp – Vadim Shipachyov (6)		Third period	No scoring
Mikko Koskinen 25 saves / 25 shots		Goalie stats	Alexander Yeryomenko 34 saves / 38 shots

March 15	HC Dynamo Moscow	1 – 4	SKA Saint Petersburg	VTB Arena
No scoring		First period	No scoring
07:29 – Konstantin Gorovikov (2)		Second period	Dinar Khafizullin (1) – pp – 04:56; Steve Moses (1) – 14:17
No scoring		Third period	Nikita Gusev (4) – pp – 03:06; Jarno Koskiranta (3) – pp – 16:11
Alexander Yeryomenko 23 saves / 27 shots		Goalie stats	Mikko Koskinen 22 saves / 23 shots

March 17	SKA Saint Petersburg	2 – 0	HC Dynamo Moscow	Ice Palace
No scoring		First period	No scoring
03:12 – pp – Nikita Gusev (5); 03:37 – Anton Belov (1)		Second period	No scoring
No scoring		Third period	No scoring
Mikko Koskinen 31 saves / 31 shots		Goalie stats	Alexander Yeryomenko 18 saves / 20 shots

Saint Petersburg wins series 4 – 2

== Conference Finals ==
=== Eastern Conference ===
==== (2) Metallurg Magnitogorsk vs. (4) Salavat Yulaev Ufa ====
March 23	Metallurg Magnitogorsk	3 – 2	2OT	Salavat Yulaev Ufa	Arena Metallurg
No scoring		First period		No scoring
17:58 – pp – Jan Kovář (5)		Second period		Sami Lepistö (3) – 07:02
04:24 – Alexei Kaigorodov (1)		Third period		Igor Grigorenko (5) – 13:13
09:37 – Sergei Mozyakin (6)		Second overtime period		No scoring
Vasily Koshechkin 47 saves / 49 shots		Goalie stats		Niklas Svedberg 47 saves / 50 shots

March 25	Metallurg Magnitogorsk	6 – 1	Salavat Yulaev Ufa	Arena Metallurg
10:40 – Denis Osipov (1)		First period	No scoring
02:08 – Bogdan Potekhin (3); 11:06 – Sergei Mozyakin (7); 12:34 – pp – Alexander Semin (5)		Second period	No scoring
08:39 – Tomáš Filippi (4); 10:42 – sh – Yaroslav Kosov (3)		Third period	Sami Lepistö (4) – pp – 11:50
Vasily Koshechkin 41 saves / 42 shots		Goalie stats	Niklas Svedberg 18 saves / 22 shots Vladimir Sokhatsky 7 saves / 9 shots

March 27	Salavat Yulaev Ufa	3 – 2	Metallurg Magnitogorsk	Ufa Arena
07:14 – pp – Sami Lepistö (5)		First period	Sergei Mozyakin (8) – 14:00; Jan Kovář (6) – pp – 18:36
09:27 – Nikolai Prokhorkin (1)		Second period	No scoring
17:43 – Sami Lepistö (6)		Third period	No scoring
Niklas Svedberg 29 saves / 31 shots		Goalie stats	Vasily Koshechkin 21 saves / 24 shots

March 29	Salavat Yulaev Ufa	1 – 3	Metallurg Magnitogorsk	Ufa Arena
No scoring		First period	Viktor Antipin (3) – 05:10
No scoring		Second period	No scoring
00:17 – Igor Grigorenko (5)		Third period	Alexander Semin (6) – pp – 07:57; Wojtek Wolski (2) – en – 19:15
Niklas Svedberg 30 saves / 32 shots		Goalie stats	Vasily Koshechkin 31 saves / 32 shots

March 31	Metallurg Magnitogorsk	3 – 2	2OT	Salavat Yulaev Ufa	Arena Metallurg
No scoring		First period		No scoring
06:21 – pp – Danis Zaripov (4)		Second period		Maxim Goncharov (2) – pp – 00:42; Maxim Mayorov (3) – 02:39
03:52 – pp – Alexei Bereglazov (1)		Third period		No scoring
01:37 – Yaroslav Kosov (4)		Second overtime period		No scoring
Vasily Koshechkin 28 saves / 30 shots		Goalie stats		Niklas Svedberg 40 saves / 43 shots

Magnitogorsk wins series 4 – 1

==== (1) HC CSKA Moscow vs. (6) SKA Saint Petersburg ====
March 22	HC CSKA Moscow	3 – 0	SKA Saint Petersburg	CSKA Ice Palace
10:27 – Roman Lyubimov (3)		First period	No scoring
09:15 – pp – Stéphane Da Costa (5)		Second period	No scoring
19:35 – en – Dmitri Kugryshev (1)		Third period	No scoring
Ilya Sorokin 27 saves / 27 shots		Goalie stats	Mikko Koskinen 21 saves / 23 shots

March 24	HC CSKA Moscow	3 – 2	SKA Saint Petersburg	CSKA Ice Palace
No scoring		First period	No scoring
No scoring		Second period	Steve Moses (2) – 09:08
03:51 – pp – Geoff Platt (4); 12:08 – Geoff Platt (5); 16:12 – pp – Alexander Radulov (3)		Third period	Jarno Koskiranta (4) – sh – 08:11
Ilya Sorokin 18 saves / 20 shots		Goalie stats	Mikko Koskinen 29 saves / 32 shots

March 26	SKA Saint Petersburg	0 – 1	2OT	HC CSKA Moscow	Ice Palace
No scoring		First period		No scoring
No scoring		Second period		No scoring
No scoring		Third period		No scoring
No scoring		Second overtime period		Geoff Platt (6) – 11:12
Mikko Koskinen 50 saves / 51 shots		Goalie stats		Ilya Sorokin 52 saves / 52 shots

February 27	SKA Saint Petersburg	1 – 2	OT	HC CSKA Moscow	Ice Palace
No scoring		First period		Ivan Telegin (2) – 09:06
No scoring		Second period		No scoring
12:03 – pp – Anton Belov (2)		Third period		No scoring
No scoring		First overtime period		Sergei Andronov (1) – 01:02
Mikko Koskinen 29 saves / 31 shots		Goalie stats		Ilya Sorokin 36 saves / 37 shots

CSKA wins series 4 – 0

== Gagarin Cup Finals ==
=== (1) HC CSKA Moscow vs. (2) Metallurg Magnitogorsk ===
April 7	HC CSKA Moscow	5 – 1	Metallurg Magnitogorsk	CSKA Ice Palace
No scoring		First period	Sergei Mozyakin (9) – 03:08
01:41 – Sergei Andronov (2); 10:06 – pp – Alexander Radulov (4); 15:43 – pp – Igor Ozhiganov (3)		Second period	No scoring
13:36 – Nikita Zaitsev (2); 15:23 – pp – Denis Denisov (1)		Third period	No scoring
Ilya Sorokin 21 saves / 22 shots		Goalie stats	Vasily Koshechkin 26 saves / 30 shots Ilya Samsonov 7 saves / 8 shots

April 9	HC CSKA Moscow	1 – 2	Metallurg Magnitogorsk	CSKA Ice Palace
12:06 – pp – Nikita Zaitsev (3)		First period	No scoring
No scoring		Second period	Danis Zaripov (5) – 03:10
No scoring		Third period	Alexei Bereglazov (2) – 01:30
Ilya Sorokin 22 saves / 24 shots		Goalie stats	Vasily Koshechkin 25 saves / 26 shots

April 11	Metallurg Magnitogorsk	2 – 3	OT	HC CSKA Moscow	Arena Metallurg
No scoring		First period		No scoring
16:16 – Danis Zaripov (6)		Second period		No scoring
19:43 – Jan Kovář (7)		Third period		Stéphane Da Costa (6) – 09:19; Nikita Zaitsev (3) – pp – 11:55
No scoring		First overtime period		Stéphane Da Costa (7) – pp – 18:12
Vasily Koshechkin 34 saves / 37 shots		Goalie stats		Ilya Sorokin 25 saves / 27 shots

April 13	Metallurg Magnitogorsk	1 – 0	HC CSKA Moscow	Arena Metallurg
No scoring		First period	No scoring
No scoring		Second period	No scoring
07:34 – pp – Tomáš Filippi (5)		Third period	No scoring
Vasily Koshechkin 30 saves / 30 shots		Goalie stats	Ilya Sorokin 32 saves / 33 shots

April 15	HC CSKA Moscow	1 – 2	OT	Metallurg Magnitogorsk	CSKA Ice Palace
No scoring		First period		No scoring
No scoring		Second period		No scoring
04:28 – Roman Lyubimov (4)		Third period		Sergei Mozyakin (10) – 14:25
No scoring		First overtime period		Sergei Mozyakin (11) – 05:09
Ilya Sorokin 22 saves / 24 shots		Goalie stats		Vasily Koshechkin 30 saves / 31 shots

April 17	Metallurg Magnitogorsk	2 – 3	OT	HC CSKA Moscow	Arena Metallurg
No scoring		First period		Mikhail Yunkov (1) – 04:33
No scoring		Second period		Ivan Telegin (3) – 03:14
14:31 – Chris Lee (2); 18:57 – Jan Kovář (8)		Third period		No scoring
No scoring		First overtime period		Mikhail Yunkov (2) – 01:40
Vasily Koshechkin 30 saves / 33 shots		Goalie stats		Ilya Sorokin 28 saves / 30 shots

April 19	HC CSKA Moscow	1 – 3	Metallurg Magnitogorsk	CSKA Ice Palace
No scoring		First period	Evgeny Timkin (1) – 12:55
15:54 – Maxim Mamin (1)		Second period	Chris Lee (2) – 18:57
No scoring		Third period	Evgeny Timkin (2) – en – 19:17
Ilya Sorokin 13 saves / 15 shots		Goalie stats	Vasily Koshechkin 36 saves / 37 shots

Magnitogorsk wins series 4 – 3

== Sibir vs Metallurg Game 4 controversy ==
In the fourth game of Sibir — Metallurg series, on 37th minute a scored goal was confirmed after the episode when a player of Sibir, while leaving the ice during substitution, made physical contact with a player of Metallurg when the substituting player of Sibir was already on the ice (violation of clause (b) of rule 411 of the Hockey Game Rules for 2015/2016).

In the overtime the game-winning goal scored by Metallurg was confirmed after the episode when Metallurg started their substitution in violation of clause (a) item 1 of rule 411 of the Hockey Game Rules for 2015/2016 (the player to be substituted is on the ice outside the substitution area), however the league's Officiating Department chose to explain the officials action by another clause of rule 411 (player involved in a substitution being hit by the puck), leaving the violation of clause (a) unexplained.

In response to an appeal filed by Sibir demanding the cancellation of the game result, according to Sibir GM Kirill Fastovsky, the KHL noted "there was no refereeing error".

According to the KHL, this demand of Sibir about the cancellation of the game result "could not be considered as an appeal" because "the appeal procedure was not strictly followed" by Sibir (mandatory note in the official game sheet by the club representative after the end of the game about their intention to appeal against the game result, followed by filing the appeal within 24 hours along with required supporting evidence). The message from the KHL also referenced Clause 77 of the KHL Sports Regulations and noted the impossibility to accept for consideration appeals based on complaints to refereeing.

== Player statistics ==
=== Scoring leaders ===
As of 19 Apr 2016

Player	Team	GP	G	A	Pts	+/–	PIM
Sergei Mozyakin	Metallurg Magnitogorsk	23	11	14	25	+14	2
Jan Kovář	Metallurg Magnitogorsk	23	8	15	23	+13	10
Vadim Shipachyov	SKA Saint Petersburg	15	7	9	16	–2	12
Linus Omark	Salavat Yulaev Ufa	19	5	11	16	+6	20
Alexander Radulov	CSKA Moscow	20	4	12	16	+5	26
Alexander Semin	Metallurg Magnitogorsk	23	7	8	15	+9	20
Danis Zaripov	Metallurg Magnitogorsk	23	6	9	15	+12	14
Nikita Gusev	SKA Saint Petersburg	15	5	9	14	–2	0
Sami Lepistö	Salavat Yulaev Ufa	19	6	7	13	+6	16
Nikita Zaitsev	CSKA Moscow	20	4	9	13	+7	10

Source: KHL

==== Leading goaltenders ====
As of 19 Apr 2016

Player	Team	GP	Min	W	L	GA	SO	SV%	GAA
Ilya Sorokin	CSKA Moscow	20	1270	15	5	28	3	.945	1.32
Mikko Koskinen	SKA Saint Petersburg	15	980	8	7	24	5	.949	1.47
Vasily Koshechkin	Metallurg Magnitogorsk	19	1182	14	5	31	3	.948	1.57
Alexander Yeryomenko	Dynamo Moscow	10	646	6	4	19	3	.940	1.76
Alexander Salák	Sibir Novosibirsk	9	523	5	4	16	2	.942	1.83

Source: KHL
