= Sergei Tereschenko =

Russian ice hockey player

- Born: 28 December 1991 (age 33) Magnitogorsk, Russia
- Height: 6 ft 2 in (188 cm)
- Weight: 212 lb (96 kg; 15 st 2 lb)
- Position: Defence
- Shoots: Right
- VHL team Former teams: HC Dinamo Saint Petersburg; Metallurg Magnitogorsk; HC Donbass; Salavat Yulaev Ufa; Traktor Chelyabinsk; Amur Khabarovsk; HC 21 Prešov
- National team: Russia
- Playing career: 2013–present

Sergei Nikolaevich Tereschenko (Russian: Сергей Николаевич Терещенко; born 28 December 1991) is a Russian professional ice hockey defenceman. He is currently playing for HC Dinamo Saint Petersburg of the VHL.

Tereschenko made his Kontinental Hockey League (KHL) debut playing with Metallurg Magnitogorsk during the 2011–12 KHL season.

== Awards and honors ==
Award	Year
MHL
All-Star Game	2010
Best Defenseman	2010, 2011
Best P Plus–minus	2010
Kharlamov Cup	2010
KHL
Gagarin Cup (Metallurg Magnitogorsk)	2014, 2016
