= Kharlamov Cup =

The Kharlamov Cup (Russian: Кубок Харламова, Kubok Kharlamova) is the trophy presented to the winner of the Russian Junior Hockey League (MHL) playoffs, and is named after ice hockey player Valeri Kharlamov, considered to be one of the greatest ice hockey players. The cup was designed by Frank Meisler.

== Cup winners ==
Key to colors
	Game played on eventual playoffs winner's home ice
	Game played on eventual playoffs runner up's home ice
W	Western Conference member
E	Eastern Conference member

Season	Playoffs winner		Playoffs runner up		Playoffs final series score	Game scores							Series-winning goal scorer
Season	Playoffs winner		Playoffs runner up		Playoffs final series score	1	2	3	4	5	6	7	Series-winning goal scorer
2009-10	E	Steel Foxes	E	Kuznetsk Bears	3–1	5 – 3	4 – 3	0 – 2	3 – 2				Bogdan Potekhin (34:06)
2010-11	W	Red Army	E	Steel Foxes	4–0	3 – 2 OT	3 – 0	4 – 3	4 – 3 OT				Vyacheslav Kulemin (62:10)
2011-12	E	Omsk Hawks	W	Red Army	4–1	5 – 2	5 – 3	1 – 3	2 – 1 OT	3 – 1			Dmitry Kuzmenko (38:10)
2012-13	E	Omsk Hawks	W	MHC Spartak	4–3	2 – 0	6 – 2	2 – 4	2 – 4	0 – 1	6 – 1	3 – 2 OT	Kirill Rasskazov (63:11)
2013-14	W	MHC Spartak	W	Red Army	4–3	4 – 1	0 – 7	1 – 3	4 – 3 OT	2 – 0	1 – 2 OT	3 – 2	Ilya Pavlyukov (51:03)
2014-15	E	Chaika	W	SKA-1946	4–1	8 – 0	4 – 1	3 – 1	1 – 4	2 – 0			Ilya Yamkin (59:34)
2015-16	W	Loko	E	Chaika	4–1	4 – 1	1 – 2 OT	4 – 2	4 – 1	6 – 3			Yegor Korshkov (59:37)
2016-17	W	Red Army	E	Reaktor	4–0	7 – 4	6 – 1	7 – 2	2 – 1				Ivan Silayev (45:04)
2017-18	W	Loko	W	SKA-1946	4–2	1 – 0 OT	2 – 3	3 – 2	0 – 1 OT	2 – 1	7 – 3		Danil Gizatullin (37:05)
2018-19	W	Loko	E	Avto	4–3	4 – 2	3 – 2	0 – 1	1 – 2	1 – 2 OT	3 – 2 OT	1 – 0	Maxim Denezhkin (23:44)
2019-20	Cancelled due to COVID-19												
2020-21	W	Dynamo Moscow	W	Loko	4–1	2 – 1	3 – 1	3 – 1	1 – 4	7 – 5			Dmitri Rachevski (54:32)
2021-22	W	SKA-1946	W	Red Army	4–2	4 – 3	0 – 1	7 – 2	6 – 2	2 – 6	3 – 2		Matvei Michkov
2022-23	E	Chaika	E	Avangard Omsk	4–2	6 – 2	2 – 6	4 – 2	5 – 2	2 – 3 OT	3 – 2 OT		Yegor Vinogradov (70:09)
2023-24	W	SKA-1946	W	Loko	4–1	3 – 6	3 – 2	2 – 1	5 – 0	2 – 1			Ivan Vydrenkov (21:24)
2024-25	W	JHC Spartak	W	SKA-1946	4–3	2 – 1	5 – 3	3 – 1	3 – 4	1 – 2	2 – 5	6 – 2	Yegor Varyushkin (58:38)

== See also ==
- Gagarin Cup, awarded to the winner of the KHL playoffs
- Petrov Cup, awarded to the winner of the VHL playoffs
