= Maksim Karpov =

Maksim or Maxim Karpov may refer to:

- Maksim Karpov (footballer) (born 1995), Russian football player
- Maxim Karpov (ice hockey) (born 1991), Russian professional hockey player
