= Bogdan Potekhin =

Russian ice hockey player

- Born: July 10, 1992 (age 33) Magnitogorsk, Russia
- Height: 6 ft 0 in (183 cm)
- Weight: 212 lb (96 kg; 15 st 2 lb)
- Position: Forward
- Shot: Left
- Played for: Metallurg Magnitogorsk; Amur Khabarovsk; HC Vityaz; Dynamo St. Petersburg; KRS-BSU; Yermak Angarsk; HC Donbass; Sokol Krasnoyarsk; HC Norilsk; HC Tambov; Metallurg Zhlobin
- Playing career: 2011–2025

Bogdan Potekhin (born July 10, 1992) is a Russian former professional ice hockey player. He most notably played with Metallurg Magnitogorsk in the Kontinental Hockey League (KHL).

Potekhin scored the winning goal to secure the 2010 Kharlamov Cup for the Steel Foxes.

On 13 September 2025, Potekhin announced his retirement from professional hockey.

== Awards and honors ==
Award	Year
MHL
Kharlamov Cup	2010
KHL
Gagarin Cup (Metallurg Magnitogorsk)	2014, 2016
