= Yury Petrov =

Yury Petrov or Yuri Petrov may refer to:

- Yury Petrov (politician, born 1939) (1939—2013), Soviet and Russian politician
- Yury Petrov (politician, born 1947), Russian politician
- Yury Petrov (historian), Russian historian
- Yury Petrov (politician, born 1964), Russian politician
- Yury Petrov (ice hockey) (born 1984), Russian ice hockey player
- Yuri Petrov (born 1974), Russian footballer
