= Dmitry Arkhipov =

Dmitry Arkhipov may refer to:

- Dmitry Arkhipov (ice hockey)
- Dmitry Arkhipov (skier)
