= Viktor Bobrov (ice hockey) =

Russian ice hockey player

- Born: January 1, 1984 (age 42) Novocheboksarsk, Russia
- Height: 6 ft 2 in (188 cm)
- Weight: 205 lb (93 kg; 14 st 9 lb)
- Position: Left wing
- Shot: Left
- KHL team Former teams: Free Agent; HC Khimik Voskresensk; HC Vityaz; Atlant Moscow Oblast; HC Sibir Novosibirsk; HC Spartak Moscow
- NHL draft: 146th overall, 2002; Calgary Flames
- Playing career: 2001–2019

Viktor Bobrov (born January 1, 1984) is a Russian ice hockey player. He is currently playing an unrestricted free agent who most recently played with HC Spartak Moscow of the Kontinental Hockey League (KHL). He was selected by Calgary Flames in the 5th round (146th overall) of the 2002 NHL entry draft.

== Career statistics ==
			Regular season					Playoffs
Season	Team	League	GP	G	A	Pts	PIM	GP	G	A	Pts	PIM
2000–01	Torpedo–2 Nizhny Novgorod	RUS.3	24	3	5	8	10	—	—	—	—	—
2001–02	CSKA–2 Moscow	RUS.3	38	11	17	28	20	—	—	—	—	—
2002–03	Elemash Elektrostal	RUS.2	48	7	7	14	16	—	—	—	—	—
2003–04	Kristall Elektrostal	RUS.2	60	6	10	16	38	—	—	—	—	—
2004–05	CSKA–2 Moscow	RUS.3	63	20	28	48	44	—	—	—	—	—
2005–06	HC Dmitrov	RUS.2	55	8	10	18	22	4	0	1	1	2
2005–06	HC–2 Dmitrov	RUS.3	1	1	0	1	0	—	—	—	—	—
2006–07	Khimik Voskresensk	RUS.2	45	12	11	23	24	5	0	1	1	6
2006–07	Khimik–2 Voskresensk	RUS.3	11	8	2	10	4	—	—	—	—	—
2007–08	Khimik Voskresensk	RUS.2	60	24	19	43	72	14	10	2	12	4
2008–09	Khimik Voskresensk	KHL	55	4	15	19	34	—	—	—	—	—
2009–10	HC Vityaz	KHL	45	8	9	17	26	—	—	—	—	—
2010–11	HC Vityaz	KHL	51	12	10	22	30	—	—	—	—	—
2011–12	Atlant Moscow Oblast	KHL	49	3	1	4	20	5	0	0	0	2
2012–13	Atlant Moscow Oblast	KHL	14	1	0	1	16	—	—	—	—	—
2012–13	Sibir Novosibirsk	KHL	15	1	4	5	8	—	—	—	—	—
2012–13	Spartak Moscow	KHL	4	0	0	0	0	—	—	—	—	—
2013–14	Spartak Moscow	KHL	40	4	3	7	17	—	—	—	—	—
2014–15	Sibir Novosibirsk	KHL	59	8	13	21	32	16	1	3	4	20
2015–16	Sibir Novosibirsk	KHL	44	5	2	7	56	10	2	1	3	0
2016–17	Spartak Moscow	KHL	57	8	3	11	28	—	—	—	—	—
2017–18	Spartak Moscow	KHL	18	0	1	1	14	—	—	—	—	—
2017–18	Khimik Voskresensk	VHL	18	4	4	8	16	4	0	1	1	14
2018–19	Khimik Voskresensk	VHL	52	3	9	12	67	4	0	0	0	6
RUS.2 & VHL totals			338	64	70	134	255	31	10	5	15	38
KHL totals			451	54	61	115	281	31	3	4	7	22
