= Ivan Vishnevskiy (ice hockey) =

- Born: February 18, 1988 (age 38) Barnaul, Russian SFSR, Soviet Union
- Height: 6 ft 0 in (183 cm)
- Weight: 203 lb (92 kg; 14 st 7 lb)
- Position: Defence
- Shot: Left
- Played for: Dallas Stars; Atlant Mytishchi; Salavat Yulaev Ufa; Torpedo Nizhny Novgorod; Traktor Chelyabinsk; Avtomobilist Yekaterinburg; Spartak Moscow; HK Poprad
- NHL draft: 27th overall, 2006; Dallas Stars
- Playing career: 2005–2021

Ivan Sergeevich Vishnevskiy (born February 18, 1988) is a Russian former professional ice hockey defenceman.

He played in the National Hockey League (NHL), with the Dallas Stars, the organization that drafted him in the first round, 27th overall, in the 2006 NHL entry draft. He was also a member of both the Atlanta Thrashers and Chicago Blackhawks organizations, though he failed to make an NHL-level appearance with either. Vishnevskiy played the majority of his professional career in the Kontinental Hockey League (KHL)

== Playing career ==
=== Amateur ===
Vishnevskiy was selected 27th overall in the first round of the 2006 NHL entry draft by the Dallas Stars, selected out of the Quebec Major Junior Hockey League (QMJHL)'s Rouyn-Noranda Huskies. He was originally the Huskies' second pick in the 2005 CHL Import Draft, later being selected for the 2006 Top Prospects game. On July 18, 2007, Vishnevskiy was signed by the Dallas Stars to a three-year, entry-level contract.

=== Professional ===
After playing an additional season of major junior with the Huskies, Vishnevskiy made his professional debut in the 2008–09 season with the Peoria Rivermen of the American Hockey League (AHL). With the Stars already mathematically eliminated from qualification to the 2009 Stanley Cup playoffs, Vishnevskiy was recalled from loan with the Rivermen and made his NHL debut with the Stars against the Minnesota Wild on April 7, 2009. Two days later, he posted his first career NHL point, an assist, in a victory against the Colorado Avalanche. He played in three games with the Stars before he was reassigned to join the Rivermen for the team's run in the 2009 Calder Cup playoffs.

Vishnevskiy was assigned to the Stars' new AHL affiliate, the Texas Stars, to begin the 2009–10 season. He appeared in two games with Dallas, later gaining infamous League-wide attention when he mistakenly lost control of the puck to score into his own net with the goaltender pulled against the San Jose Sharks on December 21, 2009. After being reassigned to the AHL, he was leading all Texas defencemen with eight goals when on February 9, 2010, he was traded to the Atlanta Thrashers, along with a fourth-round draft pick (Ivan Telegin) in 2010, in exchange for goaltender Kari Lehtonen. Vishnevskiy was then subsequently assigned to the Thrashers' AHL affiliate, the Chicago Wolves, for the remainder of the season.

In the 2010–11 off-season, Vishnevskiy's tenure with Atlanta was short-lived when he was traded, along with a second-round draft pick in 2011, to the newly crowned Stanley Cup champions, the Chicago Blackhawks, in exchange for Andrew Ladd on July 1, 2010.

Assigned to the Blackhawks' AHL affiliate, the Rockford IceHogs, for the entirety of the 2010–11 season, Vishnevskiy then signed a one-year contract with Atlant Mytishchi of the KHL on May 17, 2011.

== Career statistics ==
=== Regular season and playoffs ===
			Regular season					Playoffs
Season	Team	League	GP	G	A	Pts	PIM	GP	G	A	Pts	PIM
2003–04	Lada–2 Togliatti	RUS-3	16	0	0	0	10	—	—	—	—	—
2004–05	Lada–2 Togliatti	RUS-3	—	—	—	—	—	—	—	—	—	—
2005–06	Rouyn–Noranda Huskies	QMJHL	54	13	35	48	57	5	2	1	3	2
2006–07	Rouyn–Noranda Huskies	QMJHL	60	14	37	51	90	16	5	8	13	8
2007–08	Rouyn–Noranda Huskies	QMJHL	45	17	28	45	50	17	0	6	6	16
2008–09	Peoria Rivermen	AHL	67	6	13	19	28	5	0	2	2	2
2008–09	Dallas Stars	NHL	3	0	2	2	2	—	—	—	—	—
2009–10	Texas Stars	AHL	51	8	16	24	51	—	—	—	—	—
2009–10	Dallas Stars	NHL	2	0	0	0	0	—	—	—	—	—
2009–10	Chicago Wolves	AHL	28	2	10	12	10	14	0	6	6	4
2010–11	Rockford IceHogs	AHL	46	5	10	15	26	—	—	—	—	—
2011–12	Atlant Moscow Oblast	KHL	54	3	9	12	26	12	0	2	2	4
2012–13	Atlant Moscow Oblast	KHL	51	4	9	13	14	5	1	0	1	4
2013–14	Salavat Yulaev Ufa	KHL	42	4	3	7	14	18	3	2	5	6
2014–15	Salavat Yulaev Ufa	KHL	47	9	8	17	10	5	2	1	3	0
2015–16	Salavat Yulaev Ufa	KHL	56	4	10	14	24	19	3	3	6	6
2016–17	Torpedo Nizhny Novgorod	KHL	28	2	6	8	18	1	0	0	0	0
2017–18	Traktor Chelyabinsk	KHL	56	5	12	17	24	16	3	4	7	8
2018–19	Avtomobilist Yekaterinburg	KHL	49	3	24	27	18	8	0	2	2	2
2019–20	Avtomobilist Yekaterinburg	KHL	20	1	2	3	14	—	—	—	—	—
2019–20	Spartak Moscow	KHL	12	1	3	4	6	5	0	2	2	0
2020–21	Lada Togliatti	VHL	17	1	3	4	14	—	—	—	—	—
2020–21	HK Poprad	Slovak	11	1	3	4	2	5	1	2	3	6
NHL totals			5	0	2	2	2	—	—	—	—	—
KHL totals			415	36	86	122	168	89	12	16	28	30

Awards and achievements
Preceded by Matt Niskanen	Dallas Stars first-round draft pick 2006	Succeeded by Scott Glennie
