= Maxim Mayorov =

Russian ice hockey player

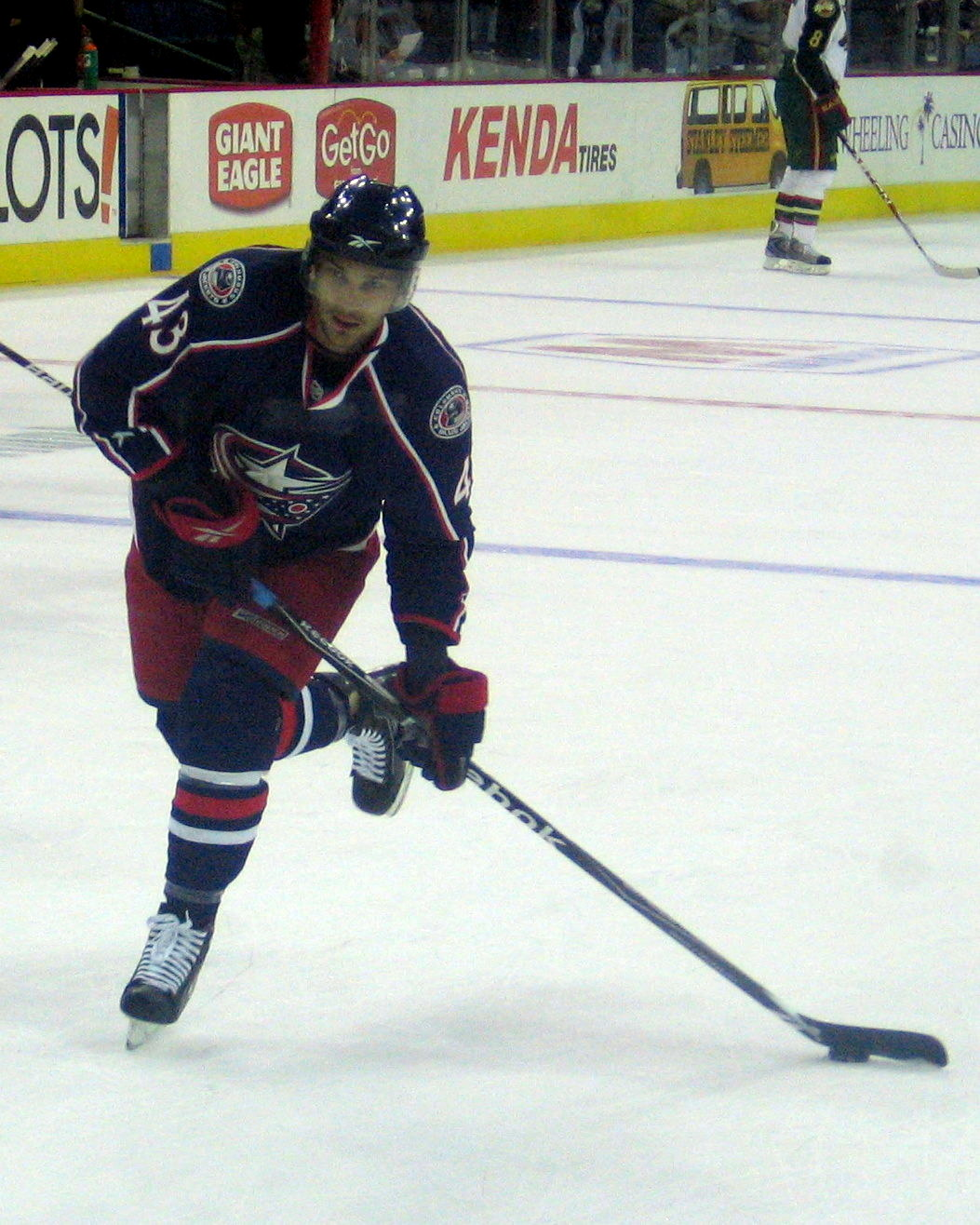
- Mayorov with the Columbus Blue Jackets in 2009
- Born: March 26, 1989 (age 37) Andijan, Uzbek SSR, Soviet Union
- Height: 6 ft 2 in (188 cm)
- Weight: 213 lb (97 kg; 15 st 3 lb)
- Position: Left wing
- Shot: Left
- Played for: Ak Bars Kazan; Columbus Blue Jackets; Atlant Mytishchi; Dynamo Moscow; Salavat Yulaev Ufa; Spartak Moscow; Traktor Chelyabinsk
- National team: Russia
- NHL draft: 94th overall, 2007; Columbus Blue Jackets
- Playing career: 2005–2021

Medal record

Ice hockey

Representing Russia

World Junior A Challenge
Bronze medal – third place	2006 Yorkton	

Maxim Olegovich Mayorov (Russian: Макси́м Оле́гович Майо́ров; born March 26, 1989) is an Uzbekistani-born Russian former ice hockey player. He played 22 games in the National Hockey League with the Columbus Blue Jackets between 2008 and 2012. The rest of his career, which lasted from 2005 to 2021, was mainly spent in the Kontinental Hockey League.

== Playing career ==
Mayorov attracted the attention of NHL scouts when playing for Neftyanik Leninogorsk in 2006–07. He was rated fourth overall among European players by NHL Central Scouting. The Columbus Blue Jackets chose him 94th overall in the fourth round of the 2007 NHL entry draft. He started the 2007–08 season with Ak Bars Kazan's third-level team, but was elevated to the main Russian Superleague (RSL) team.

On June 7, 2016, Mayorov agreed to a two-year contract extension to continue with Salavat Yulaev Ufa.

== Career statistics ==
=== Regular season and playoffs ===
			Regular season					Playoffs
Season	Team	League	GP	G	A	Pts	PIM	GP	G	A	Pts	PIM
2005–06	Ak Bars Kazan-2	RUS-3	16	11	4	15	4	—	—	—	—	—
2006–07	Ak Bars Kazan-2	RUS-3	2	0	0	0	0	—	—	—	—	—
2006–07	Neftyanik Leninogorsk	RUS-2	28	6	4	10	6	—	—	—	—	—
2006–07	Neftyanik Almetyevsk	RUS-2	6	1	1	2	0	4	0	0	0	2
2007–08	Ak Bars Kazan	RSL	10	1	0	1	16	—	—	—	—	—
2008–09	Syracuse Crunch	AHL	71	17	14	31	30	—	—	—	—	—
2008–09	Columbus Blue Jackets	NHL	3	0	0	0	0	—	—	—	—	—
2009–10	Syracuse Crunch	AHL	74	17	15	32	24	—	—	—	—	—
2009–10	Columbus Blue Jackets	NHL	4	0	0	0	0	—	—	—	—	—
2010–11	Springfield Falcons	AHL	69	19	14	33	16	13	6	3	9	4
2010–11	Columbus Blue Jackets	NHL	5	1	0	1	0	—	—	—	—	—
2011–12	Columbus Blue Jackets	NHL	10	1	1	2	2	—	—	—	—	—
2011–12	Springfield Falcons	AHL	46	10	13	23	10	—	—	—	—	—
2012–13	Atlant Moscow Oblast	KHL	40	16	6	22	14	5	0	1	1	0
2013–14	Atlant Moscow Oblast	KHL	28	5	13	18	2	—	—	—	—	—
2014–15	Atlant Moscow Oblast	KHL	18	2	4	6	0	—	—	—	—	—
2014–15	Dynamo Moscow	KHL	7	0	0	0	2	1	0	0	0	2
2015–16	Salavat Yulaev Ufa	KHL	30	10	6	16	10	16	3	4	7	4
2016–17	Salavat Yulaev Ufa	KHL	45	6	10	16	18	1	0	0	0	0
2017–18	Salavat Yulaev Ufa	KHL	52	3	7	10	0	14	3	1	4	2
2018–19	Salavat Yulaev Ufa	KHL	44	9	7	16	8	13	2	1	3	0
2019–20	Salavat Yulaev Ufa	KHL	40	3	2	5	7	2	0	1	1	0
2020–21	Spartak Moscow	KHL	11	0	1	1	2	—	—	—	—	—
2020–21	Traktor Chelyabinsk	KHL	10	0	2	2	0	—	—	—	—	—
NHL totals			22	2	1	3	2	—	—	—	—	—
KHL totals			325	54	58	112	63	52	8	8	16	8
