= Ilya Proskuryakov =

Russian ice hockey player

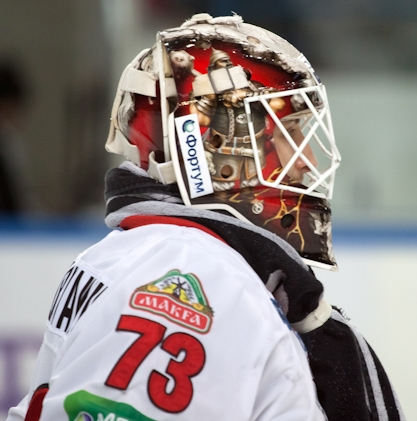
- Born: February 21, 1987 (age 39) Surgut, Russian SFSR, Soviet Union
- Height: 5 ft 11 in (180 cm)
- Weight: 176 lb (80 kg; 12 st 8 lb)
- Position: Goaltender
- Catches: Left
- KHL team Former teams: Free agent Metallurg Magnitogorsk; CSKA Moscow; Traktor Chelyabinsk; Admiral Vladivostok; Torpedo Nizhny Novgorod; HC Yugra; Krefeld Pinguine; HC Sochi; Dinamo Riga; Avangard Omsk
- Playing career: 2003–present

Ilya Proskuryakov (Russian: Илья Проскуряков; born February 21, 1987) is a Russian professional goaltender who is currently an unrestricted free agent. He most recently played for Avangard Omsk in the Kontinental Hockey League (KHL).

== Playing career ==
Ilya Proskuryakov began his professional career in 2003, playing with Metallurg-2 Magnitogorsk of the Russian Hockey First League (Pervaya Liga). At just 18 years of age, Proskuryakov made his debut for parent team Metallurg Magnitogorsk of the Russian Superleague.

Proskuryakov amassed less than 463 minutes within the Superleague over the next four years, but after Metallurg starter Andrei Mezin became injured in 2009, Proskuryakov rocketed up the charts as one of the brightest KHL rookies.

In late January, 2009, Proskuryakov played one of his greatest games yet, earning a 2-0 win for his team, and stopping 26 saves for the shutout. Proskuryakov's night did not end there though as he became the first netminder to score a goal in a KHL game, when he added an empty net goal with 15 seconds left in the game.

== Career statistics ==
=== Regular season and playoffs ===
			Regular season									Playoffs
Season	Team	League	GP	W	L	T/OT	MIN	GA	SO	GAA	SV%	GP	W	L	MIN	GA	SO	GAA	SV%
2004–05	Metallurg Magnitogorsk	RSL	1	—	—	—	—	—	—	3.89	—	—	—	—	—	—	—	—	—
2006–07	Metallurg Magnitogorsk	RSL	1	—	—	—	—	—	—	0.00	1.000	—	—	—	—	—	—	—	—
2007–08	Metallurg Magnitogorsk	RSL	13	—	—	—	—	—	—	1.77	.935	—	—	—	—	—	—	—	—
2008–09	Metallurg Magnitogorsk	KHL	40	22	11	7	2196	86	4	2.35	.912	9	6	2	463	19	2	2.46	.921
2009–10	Metallurg Magnitogorsk	KHL	32	19	8	4	1810	58	4	1.92	.927	3	0	1	103	3	0	1.75	.912
2010–11	Metallurg Magnitogorsk	KHL	18	10	4	3	960	38	3	2.38	.923	—	—	—	—	—	—	—	—
2010–11	CSKA Moscow	KHL	3	0	2	1	185	12	0	3.89	.846	—	—	—	—	—	—	—	—
2011–12	Traktor Chelyabinsk	KHL	12	5	1	3	609	23	0	2.27	.908	1	1	0	45	3	0	3.95	.769
2012–13	CSKA Moscow	KHL	18	4	4	7	577	23	0	2.39	.914	1	0	0	44	0	0	0.00	1.000
2013–14	CSKA Moscow	KHL	25	12	8	3	1270	43	3	2.03	.929	—	—	—	—	—	—	—	—
2014–15	Admiral Vladivostok	KHL	36	13	15	2	1895	79	1	2.50	.902	—	—	—	—	—	—	—	—
2015–16	Torpedo Nizhny Novgorod	KHL	40	16	7	13	1957	67	2	2.05	.921	10	5	4	538	24	1	2.67	.912
2016–17	Torpedo Nizhny Novgorod	KHL	50	24	17	8	2584	75	7	1.74	.927	2	1	1	129	6	0	2.79	.897
2017–18	HC Yugra	KHL	39	9	22	4	2052	98	1	2.86	.914	—	—	—	—	—	—	—	—
2018–19	Krefeld Pinguine	DEL	14	2	9	0	680	38	1	3.35	.865	—	—	—	—	—	—	—	—
2019–20	HC Sochi	KHL	18	4	7	4	863	34	2	2.36	.906	—	—	—	—	—	—	—	—
2020–21	Dinamo Riga	KHL	14	1	8	3	738	38	0	3.09	.887	—	—	—	—	—	—	—	—
2021–22	HC Lada Togliatti	VHL	13	4	4	2	583	26	1	2.68	.905	—	—	—	—	—	—	—	—
2022–23	Traktor Chelyabinsk	KHL	31	11	13	4	1601	65	4	2.44	.909	—	—	—	—	—	—	—	—
2022–23	Chelmet Chelyabinsk	VHL	1	1	0	0	60	2	0	2.00	.941	—	—	—	—	—	—	—	—
2023–24	Avangard Omsk	KHL	24	12	6	2	1262	46	2	2.19	.923	1	0	0	24	3	0	7.38	.667
2023–24	Omskie Krylia	VHL	2	0	2	0	107	10	0	5.56	.881	—	—	—	—	—	—	—	—
2024–25	Avangard Omsk	KHL	6	1	3	0	275	14	0	3.06	.895	—	—	—	—	—	—	—	—
KHL totals			406	158	134	68	20,834	799	33	2.30	.915	27	13	8	1347	58	3	2.58	.915

=== International ===
Year	Team	Event	Result	GP	W	L	T	MIN	GA	SO	GAA	SV%
2005	Russia	WJC18	5th	4	—	—	—	—	—	—	3.00	.905
Junior totals				4	—	—	—	—	—	—	3.00	.905

== Awards and honours ==
Award	Year
KHL
Aleksei Cherepanov Award (Best Rookie)	2009
