= Denis Mosalev =

Russian ice hockey player

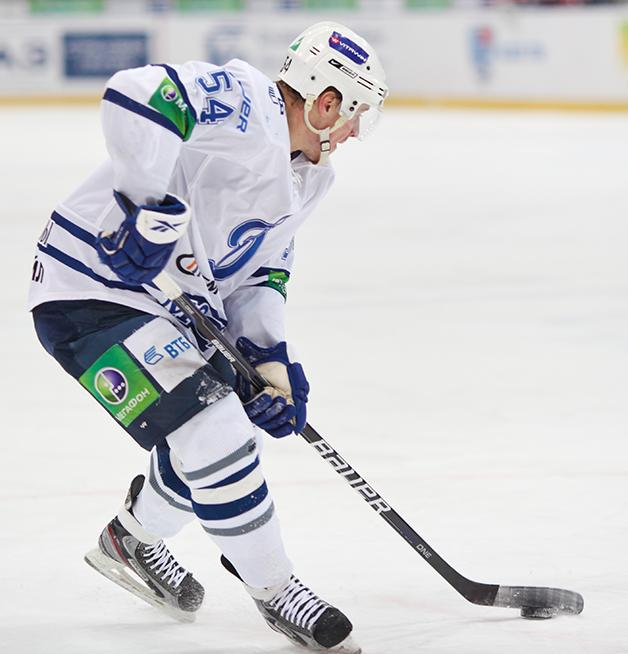
- Born: 28 February 1986 (age 39); Kartaly, Russia
- Height: 5 ft 10 in (178 cm)
- Weight: 174 lb (79 kg; 12 st 6 lb)
- Position: Forward
- Shoots: Left
- KHL team Former teams: Dinamo Minsk; Metallurg Magnitogorsk; HC MVD; Dynamo Moscow; HC Sochi
- Playing career: 2006–present

Denis Mosalev (born 28 February 1986) is a Russian professional ice hockey player who is currently playing with HC Dinamo Minsk in the Kontinental Hockey League (KHL).

Mosalev previously played with HC Dynamo Moscow of the KHL from the 2010–11 season. After previously playing at the top level with Metallurg Magnitogorsk and HC MVD.
