= Alexei Sopin =

Russian ice hockey player

- Born: 4 March 1987 (age 39) Zhukovsky, Moscow Oblast, Russian SFSR, Soviet Union
- Height: 5 ft 11 in (180 cm)
- Weight: 190 lb (86 kg; 13 st 8 lb)
- Position: Forward
- Shot: Left
- Played for: Dynamo Moscow; Metallurg Novokuznetsk; Avangard Omsk; Torpedo Nizhny Novgorod; Sibir Novosibirsk
- Playing career: 2004–2018

Alexei Sopin (born 4 March 1987) is a Russian former professional ice hockey player who is currently serving as the General manager with HC Dynamo Moscow of the Kontinental Hockey League (KHL).

Sopin has played in four separate stints including in the KHL during the 2012–13 season.

After his 6th year with Dynamo, Sopin while still contracted was granted free agent status from the KHL following the 2016–17 season, due to the club's debt on July 4, 2017. He left to promptly sign a one-year contract with HC Sibir Novosibirsk the following day on July 5, 2017.
