= Evgeny Korotkov =

Russian ice hockey player

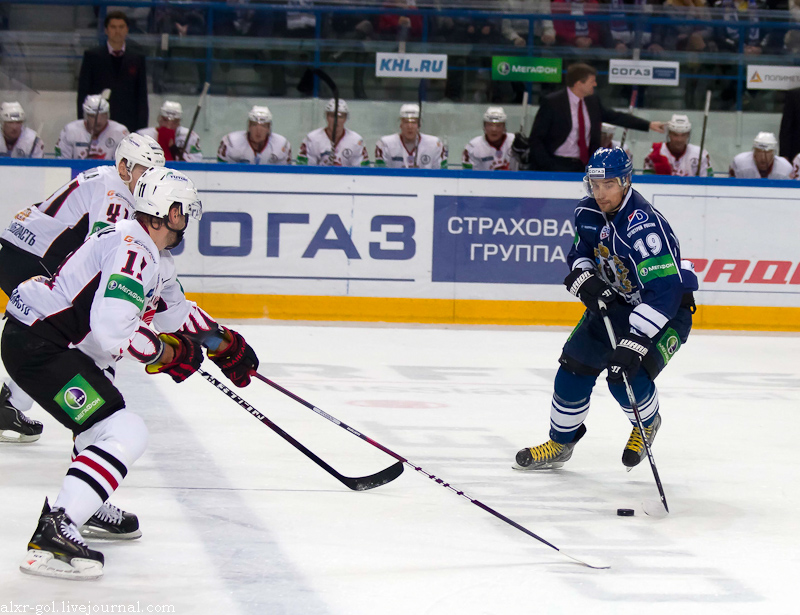
- Born: December 10, 1987 (age 38) Moscow, Russian SFSR, Soviet Union
- Height: 6 ft 3 in (191 cm)
- Weight: 223 lb (101 kg; 15 st 13 lb)
- Position: Forward
- Shoots: Left
- KHL team Former teams: Free Agent; HK Brest; Krylia Sovetov Moscow; CSKA Moscow; Amur Khabarovsk; Neftekhimik Nizhnekamsk; Salavat Yulaev Ufa; Severstal Cherepovets; Lokomotiv Yaroslavl
- Playing career: 2004–present

Evgeny Korotkov (born December 10, 1987) is a Russian professional ice hockey forward who is currently an unrestricted free agent. He last played on a tryout for HC Neftekhimik Nizhnekamsk in the Kontinental Hockey League (KHL). Korotkov returned to HC CSKA Moscow in a trade after three seasons with Amur Khabarovsk on May 20, 2014.
