= Artur Lauta =

Russian ice hockey player (born 1996)

- Born: February 14, 1996 (age 29) Omsk, Russia
- Height: 6 ft 0 in (183 cm)
- Weight: 192 lb (87 kg; 13 st 10 lb)
- Position: Right wing/ Left Wing
- Shoots: Right
- KHL team: Avangard Omsk
- NHL draft: Undrafted
- Playing career: 2014–present

Artur Andreyevich Lauta (Russian: Артур Андреевич Лаута; born February 14, 1996) is a Russian ice hockey player. He is currently playing with Avangard Omsk of the Kontinental Hockey League (KHL).

Lauta made his Kontinental Hockey League debut playing with Avangard Omsk during the 2014–15 KHL season.

== Career statistics ==
=== Regular season and playoffs ===
			Regular season					Playoffs
Season	Team	League	GP	G	A	Pts	PIM	GP	G	A	Pts	PIM
2012–13	Little Caesars U18	HPHL	27	10	14	24	33	—	—	—	—	—
2013–14	Omskie Yastreby	MHL	45	16	15	31	16	12	2	1	3	8
2014–15	Omskie Yastreby	MHL	33	24	18	42	28	3	2	1	3	8
2014–15	Avangard Omsk	KHL	12	0	1	1	0	—	—	—	—	—
2015–16	Omskie Yastreby	MHL	8	4	3	7	2	—	—	—	—	—
2015–16	Avangard Omsk	KHL	27	4	0	4	6	8	2	0	2	12
2016–17	Omskie Yastreby	MHL	1	1	0	1	0	—	—	—	—	—
2016–17	Avangard Omsk	KHL	26	1	0	1	10	—	—	—	—	—
KHL totals			65	5	1	6	16	11	2	1	3	14

=== International ===
Year	Team	Event	Result	GP	G	A	Pts	PIM
2013	Russia	IH18	4th	4	0	0	0	2
2016	Russia	WJC	2nd place, silver medalist(s)	7	3	2	5	4
Junior totals				11	3	2	5	6
