= Nikita Shchitov =

Russian ice hockey player

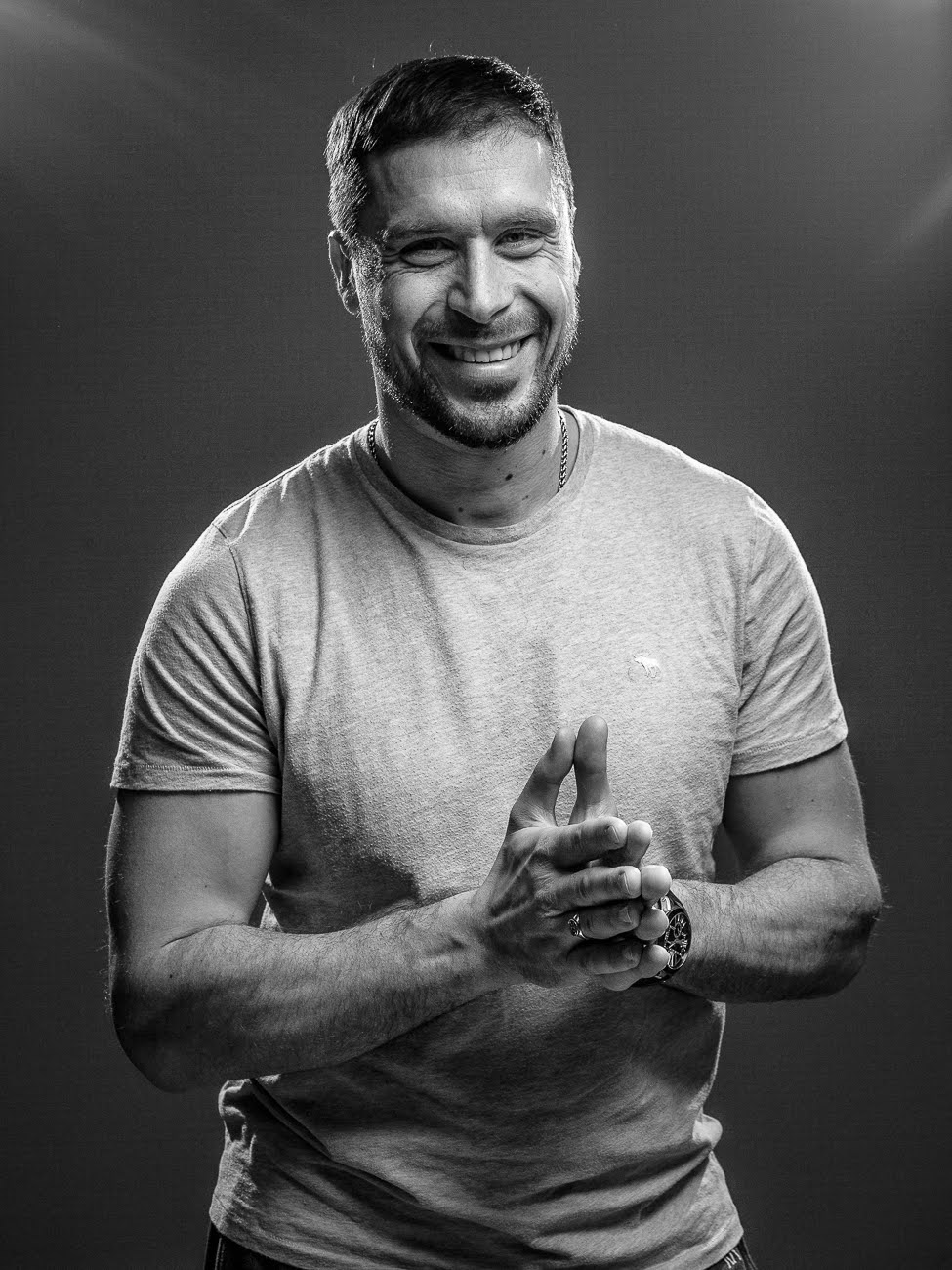
- Born: December 24, 1983 (age 41); Ufa, Russian SFSR
- Height: 6 ft 1 in (185 cm)
- Weight: 187 lb (85 kg; 13 st 5 lb)
- Position: Defence
- Shot: Left
- Played for: Salavat Yulaev Ufa; Neftekhimik Nizhnekamsk; Spartak Moscow; HC Sochi; Avtomobilist Yekaterinburg
- Playing career: 2005–2019

Nikita Shchitov (born December 24, 1983) is a Russian former professional ice hockey defenceman who last played for HC Sochi in the Kontinental Hockey League (KHL). He formerly played with Salavat Yulaev Ufa, Neftekhimik Nizhnekamsk, HC Spartak Moscow and HC Sochi in Russia's top-tier leagues.

Shchitov ended his 15-year professional career after missing the entirety of the 2019–20 season due to injury. He finished his career as captain of HC Sochi, having played parts of four seasons with the club and leading the club in games played and points among defencemen.
