= Konstantin Makarov (ice hockey) =

Russian ice hockey player

- Born: September 17, 1985 (age 40) Ufa, Russian SFSR, Soviet Union
- Height: 5 ft 11 in (180 cm)
- Weight: 196 lb (89 kg; 14 st 0 lb)
- Position: Left wing
- Shoots: Right
- VHL team Former teams: Metallurg Novokuznetsk; Metallurg Magnitogorsk; Salavat Yulaev Ufa; Neftekhimik Nizhnekamsk; Lokomotiv Yaroslavl; Amur Khabarovsk; Yugra Khanty-Mansiysk; Sibir Novosibirsk; Avtomobilist Yekaterinburg; Admiral Vladivostok; Kunlun Red Star
- Playing career: 2003–present

Konstantin Makarov (born September 17, 1985) is a Russian professional ice hockey player who is currently playing with Metallurg Novokuznetsk in the Supreme Hockey League (VHL). He is the younger brother to Dmitri Makarov who also plays professionally in the KHL.

Makarov was a member of the Russian team that toured the Central Hockey League in 2003.
