= Artyom Lukoyanov =

Russian ice hockey player

- Born: January 31, 1989 (age 37) Almetyevsk, Russian SFSR
- Height: 6 ft 0 in (183 cm)
- Weight: 205 lb (93 kg; 14 st 9 lb)
- Position: Forward
- Shoots: Left
- KHL team Former teams: Free agent Ak Bars Kazan; Yunison-Moskva
- Playing career: 2005–present

Artyom Vladimirovich Lukoyanov (Russian: Артём Владимирович Лукоянов; born 31 January 1989) is a Russian professional ice hockey forward who is currently an unrestricted free agent. He most recently played with Yunison-Moskva in the Supreme Hockey League (KHL).

Lukoyanov played with Ak Bars during the 2012–13 season.

After 13 seasons having played the entirety of his KHL career with Ak Bars Kazan, Lukoyanov left the club as a free agent on 1 August 2024.

== Awards and honours ==
Award	Year
KHL
Gagarin Cup (Ak Bars Kazan)	2018

== Football appearance ==
On 17 April 2019, third-tier Russian Professional Football League club FC KAMAZ Naberezhnye Chelny announced the signing of Lukoyanov as a football player. On 21 April 2019, he made his professional football debut in a game against FC Ufa-2, coming on as a substitute for David Karayev in the 86th minute of the game and KAMAZ up 2–0. He returned to hockey after the game, even though he remained on KAMAZ's roster until the end of the 2018–19 season.
