= Yegor Zhuravlyov =

Russian ice hockey player

- Born: April 12, 1990 (age 35) Nizhny Tagil, Russia
- Height: 6 ft 4 in (193 cm)
- Weight: 203 lb (92 kg; 14 st 7 lb)
- Position: Defence
- Shoots: Left
- VHL team Former teams: Metallurg Novokuznetsk; Avtomobilist Yekaterinburg; HC Yugra; Amur Khabarovsk
- Playing career: 2010–present

Yegor Zhuravlyov (born April 12, 1990) is a Russian professional ice hockey defenceman. He is currently playing with Metallurg Magnitogorsk of the Supreme Hockey League (VHL).

Zhuravlyov made his Kontinental Hockey League debut playing with Avtomobilist Yekaterinburg during the 2013–14 KHL season.
