= Evgeny Grigorenko =

Russian ice hockey player (born 1992)

- Born: August 11, 1992 (age 33) Magnitogorsk, Russia
- Height: 5 ft 11 in (180 cm)
- Weight: 190 lb (86 kg; 13 st 8 lb)
- Position: Right wing
- Shoots: Left
- VHL team Former teams: Metallurg Novokuznetsk; Metallurg Magnitogorsk; Neftekhimik Nizhnekamsk; Ak Bars Kazan; Admiral Vladivostok
- Playing career: 2012–present

Evgeny Andreevich Grigorenko (Григоренко, Евгений Андреевич, born August 11, 1992) is a Russian professional ice hockey player. He is currently playing with Metallurg Novokuznetsk of the Supreme Hockey League (VHL).

Grigorenko made his Kontinental Hockey League (KHL) debut playing with Metallurg Magnitogorsk during the 2012–13 KHL season.
