= Vladimir Sokhatsky =

Russian ice hockey player

- Born: December 29, 1989 (age 36) Ufa, Russian SFSR, Soviet Union
- Height: 6 ft 0 in (183 cm)
- Weight: 179 lb (81 kg; 12 st 11 lb)
- Position: Goaltender
- Catches: Left
- VHL team Former teams: Saryarka Karaganda; Salavat Yulaev Ufa; Avtomobilist Yekaterinburg
- Playing career: 2006–present

Vladimir Sokhatsky (born December 29, 1989) is a Russian professional ice hockey goaltender who is currently playing for Saryarka Karaganda in the Supreme Hockey League (VHL). He most notably played with Salavat Yulaev Ufa of the Kontinental Hockey League (KHL).
