= Ivan Nalimov =

- Born: March 12, 1994 (age 32) Novokuznetsk, Russia
- Height: 6 ft 4 in (193 cm)
- Weight: 214 lb (97 kg; 15 st 4 lb)
- Position: Goaltender
- Catches: Left
- KHL team Former teams: Free Agent; Admiral Vladivostok; Sibir Novosibirsk; Salavat Yulaev Ufa; Kunlun Red Star; Avangard Omsk; HC Sochi; Dinamo Riga; Rockford IceHogs; Metallurg Magnitogorsk
- NHL draft: 179th overall, 2014; Chicago Blackhawks
- Playing career: 2014–present

Ivan Nalimov (born March 12, 1994) is a Russian professional ice hockey goaltender. He is currently an unrestricted free agent who most recently played with Metallurg Magnitogorsk of the Kontinental Hockey League (KHL). He was drafted in the 6th round, 179th overall, in the 2014 NHL entry draft by the Chicago Blackhawks.

== Playing career ==
Nalimov was selected by SKA Saint Petersburg in the first round (12th overall) of the 2011 KHL Junior Draft. He made his Kontinental Hockey League debut during the 2014–15 KHL season with Admiral Vladivostok.

In the 2017–18 season, Nailmov appeared in 17 games with Vladivostok before he was traded, as the club fell out of playoff contention, to Salavat Yulaev Ufa on December 27, 2017.

On August 6, 2018, Nalimov joined his fourth KHL club in signing a one-year deal as a free agent with Chinese outfit, Kunlun Red Star. In the 2018–19 season, Nalimov made four appearances with the Red Star before he was traded to Avangard Omsk.

After impressing in his short stint with Avangard, on 13 July 2019, Nalimov was returned in a trade to original draft club, SKA Saint Petersburg, in exchange for fellow goaltending prospect, Ivan Prosvetov. With the 2019–20 season underway, before making his season debut, Nalimov continued his journeyman career in the KHL as he was again traded by SKA to HC Sochi on 8 October 2019. He made 24 appearances with Sochi, posting a .911 save percentage unable to help propel the club to the post-season.

Nalimov extended his season in North America by signing a professional try-out contract with the Rockford IceHogs of the American Hockey League (AHL), the primary affiliate to the Chicago Blackhawks, on 7 March 2020. He made 5 appearances with the IceHogs, collecting 2 wins to close out the campaign.

As a free agent, Nalimov opted to return to Russia, agreeing to a one-year contract with original KHL club, Admiral Vladivostok, on 6 July 2021. He went winless through 10 appearances with the Admirals, in the 2021–22 season, before he was traded to add depth to Metallurg Magnitogorsk on 27 December 2021.
