= Alexei Potapov =

Russian ice hockey player (born 1989)

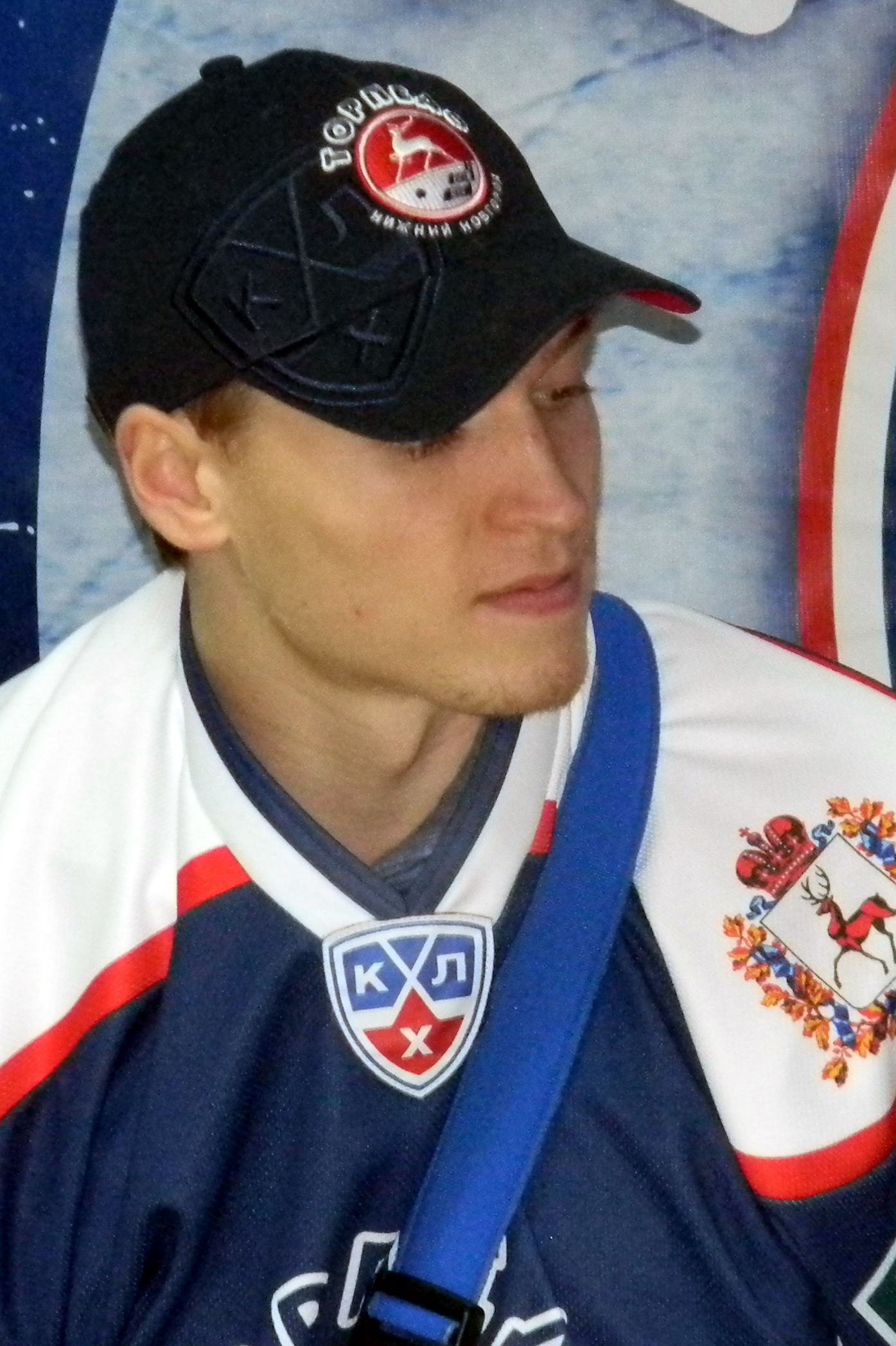
- Born: March 2, 1989 (age 36) Nizhny Novgorod, Russian SFSR
- Height: 6 ft 1 in (185 cm)
- Weight: 198 lb (90 kg; 14 st 2 lb)
- Position: Forward
- Shoots: Left
- KHL team Former teams: Free agent Torpedo Nizhny Novgorod; Ak Bars Kazan; Avangard Omsk; Traktor Chelyabinsk; Dynamo Moscow
- Playing career: 2008–present

Alexei Potapov (born March 2, 1989) is a Russian professional ice hockey player. He is currently an unrestricted free agent who most recently played with HC Dynamo Moscow of the Kontinental Hockey League (KHL).

== Playing career ==
Potapov made his Kontinental Hockey League debut playing with Torpedo Nizhny Novgorod during the inaugural 2008–09 KHL season.

During his 11th season with Torpedo Nizhny in 2017–18, and going scoreless in 18 contests, Potapov as the longest tenured player was traded by Torpedo to Ak Bars Kazan on November 20, 2017. He added four goals in 24 regular season contests before helping Ak Bars to their third Gagarin Cup title in the post-season.

As a free agent from Ak Bars, Potapov continued his KHL career in agreeing to a two-year contract with Avangard Omsk on 2 May 2019.

After helping Avangard capture the Gagarin Cup in the 2020–21 season, Potapov left as a free agent and was signed to a two-year contract with Traktor Chelyabinsk on 7 May 2021.

== Awards and honours ==
Award	Year
KHL
All-Star Game	2017
Gagarin Cup (Ak Bars Kazan)	2018
Gagarin Cup (Avangard Omsk)	2021
