= Artyom Alyayev =

Russian ice hockey player

- Born: January 17, 1995 (age 31) Nizhny Novgorod, Russia
- Height: 5 ft 8 in (173 cm)
- Weight: 179 lb (81 kg; 12 st 11 lb)
- Position: Defence
- Shoots: Left
- VHL team Former teams: HC Ugra; Torpedo Nizhny Novgorod; Spartak Moscow; Lada Togliatti; Dinamo Riga; Amur Khabarovsk; HC Sochi
- Playing career: 2014–present

Artyom Alekseevich Alyayev (Russian: Артём Алексеевич Аляев; born January 17, 1995) is a Russian professional ice hockey defenceman. He is currently playing with HC Ugra of the Supreme Hockey League (VHL).

On September 18, 2014, Alyayev made his Kontinental Hockey League debut playing with Torpedo Nizhny Novgorod during the 2014–15 KHL season.
