= G-Drive Arena =

Indoor ice rink in Omsk, Russia

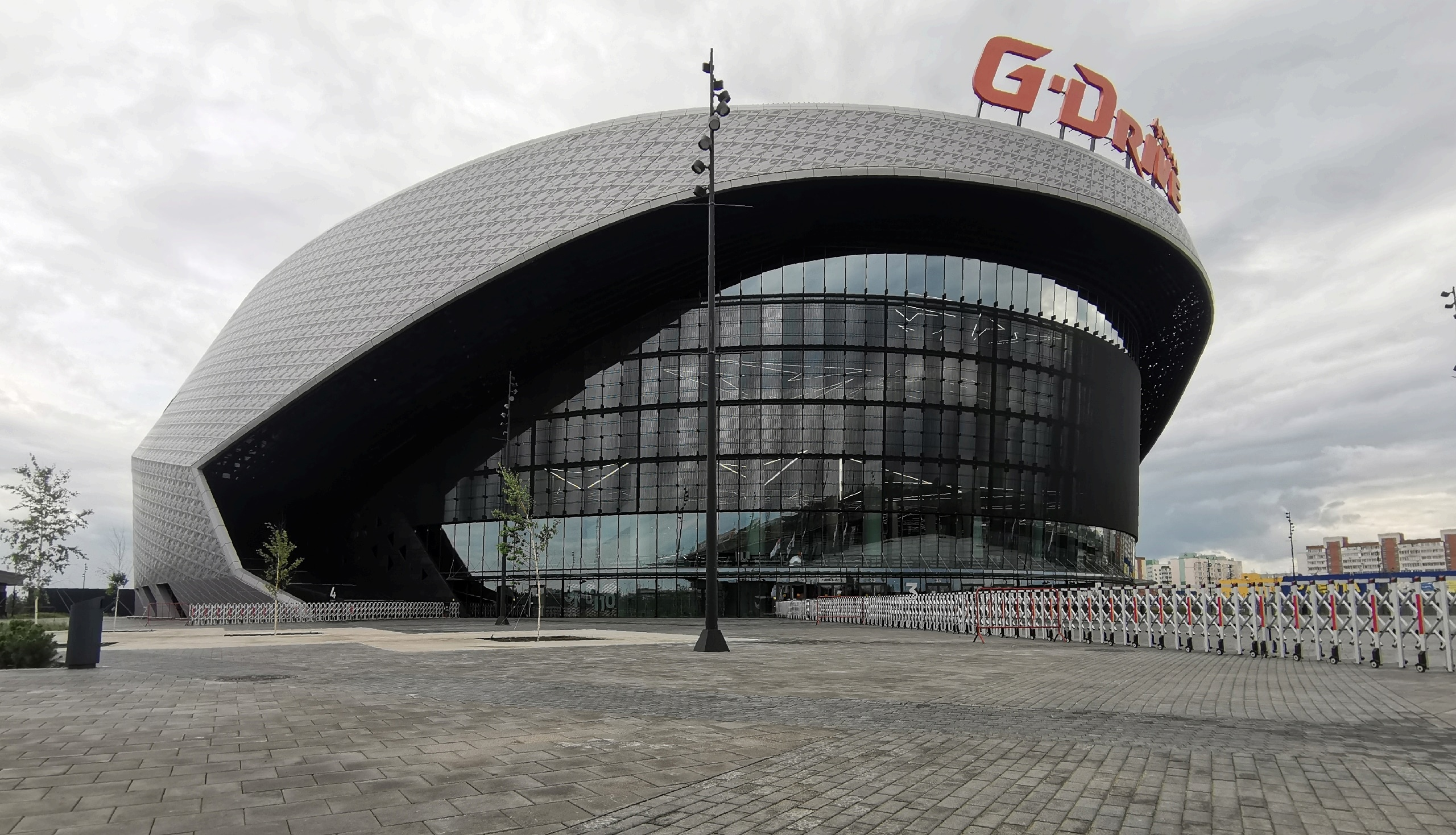
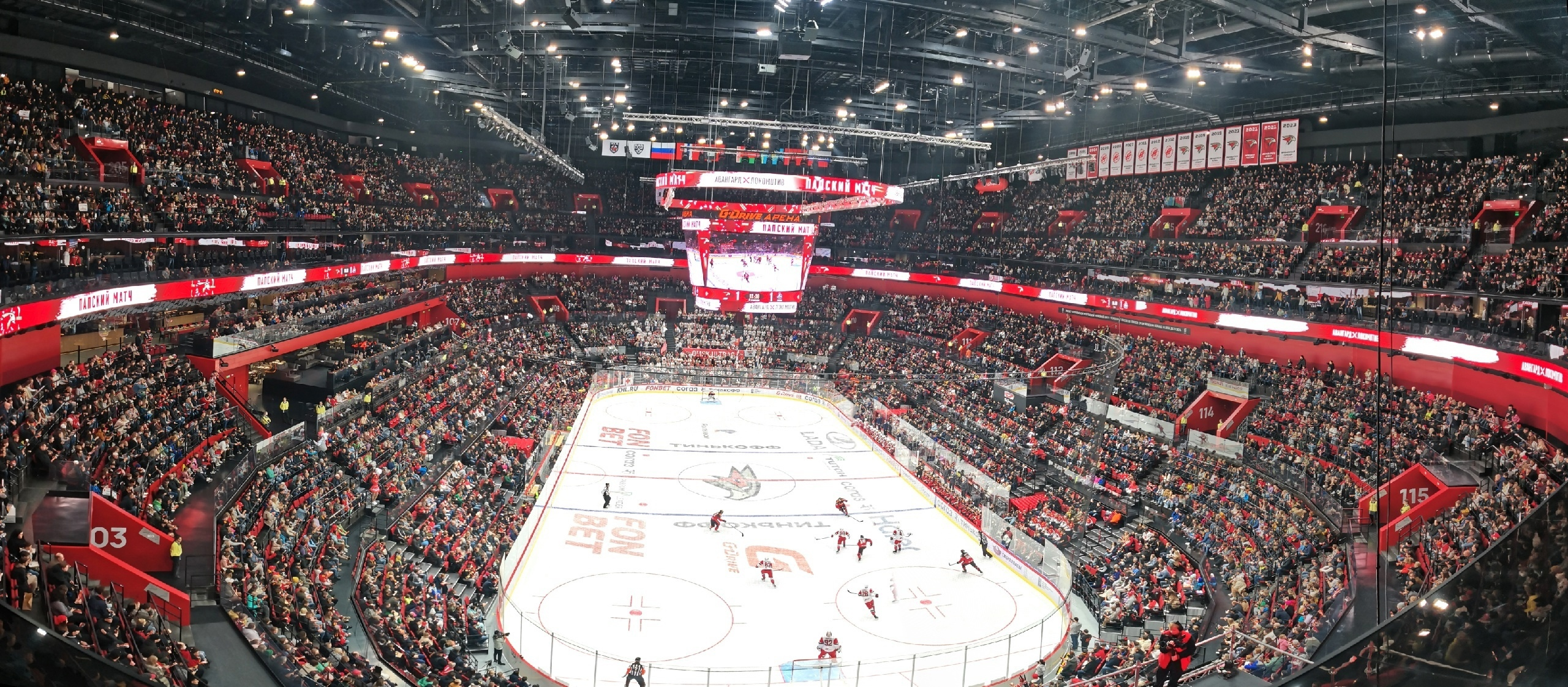
- Interactive map of G-Drive Arena
- Location: 35 Lukashevicha Street, Omsk, Russia
- Coordinates: 55°0′31″N 73°17′51″E
- Elevation: (Floor count; 6)
- Owner: The concessionaire is Arena LLC
- Operator: Arena LLC
- Capacity: Ice hockey:12,011
- Type: Ice Palace
- Record attendance: Ice hockey:12,011
- Field size: 60×26 m
- Acreage: 63,717 sq.m

Construction
- Groundbreaking: 2019
- Built: 2019–2022
- Opened: 1 October 2022; 3 years ago
- Cost: 12 billion RUB
- Architects: Vladislav Valoven, ABD architects, B2B Architects & Bureau V Architecture & SpecialOne
- Project manager: Arena Engineering LLC
- General contractor: LMS Group of Companies
- Main contractor: Severin Development

Tenant
- Avangard Omsk (KHL) 1 October 2022; 3 years ago

Website
- www.gdrive-arena.ru

G-Drive Arena (Russian: G-Drive Арена) is a multi-purpose indoor arena in Omsk, Russia. Opened in 2022 to replace Arena Omsk, it is the home arena of Avangard Omsk of the Kontinental Hockey League.

== History ==
In 2018, the previous arena that occupied the spot, Arena Omsk, was found to be structurally deficient, and had to be demolished, which was completed in September 2019. It was stated that a new arena will be built at its place and is planning to open in September 2022 for the beginning of the 2022-23 KHL season. As a result of this, from 2018 until 2022, Avangard had to temporarily relocate to the Balashikha Arena in the outskirts of Moscow, nearly 2,700 kilometers (1,678 miles) away from Omsk.

In January 2020, construction on the arena began and finished in the summer of 2022. On September 27, 2022, the first hockey game was played at the new arena between Siberian Snipers and Omsk Hawks, with the former winning the game by a score of 7–2. On October 1, 2022, the first KHL game was played at G-Drive Arena between Avangard Omsk and their Siberian rivals, HC Sibir Novosibirsk. Sibir's Trevor Murphy scored the first goal in the arena's history, but Avangard came back to win the game 2–1. The arena was originally planned to host games for the 2023 IIHF World Junior Championship, along with Sibir Arena in Novosibirsk, but, in April 2022, the IIHF stripped Russia's hosting rights while the International Olympic Committee (IOC) called for Russia and Belarus to be stripped of hosting rights to all international sporting events due to the Russian invasion of Ukraine.

In the 2024-25 KHL season, Avangard drew the third-highest average home attendance with 11,666.

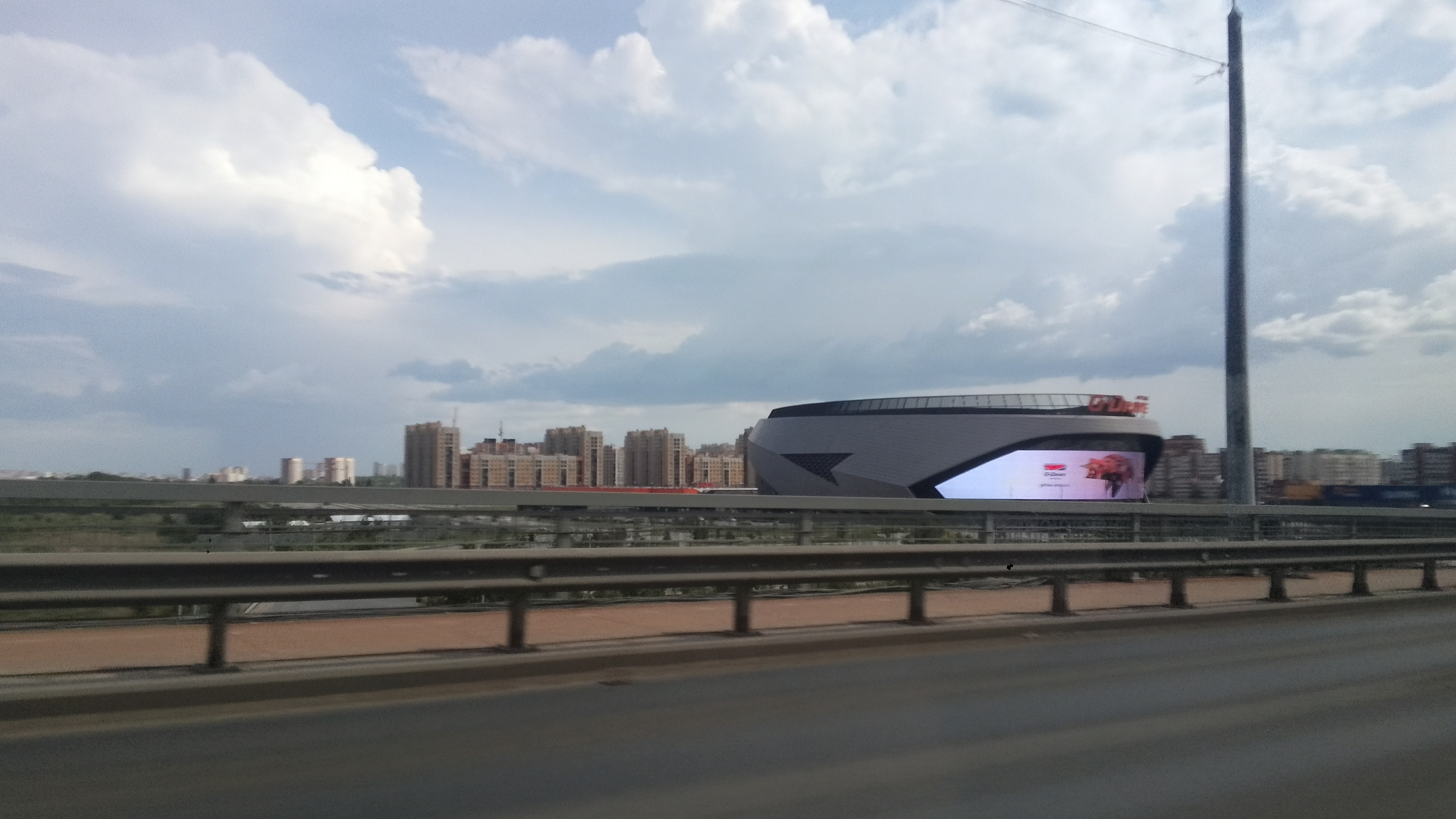
View from the bridge over the Irtysh River

== See also ==
- List of indoor arenas in Russia
- List of European ice hockey arenas
- List of KHL arenas
- List of VHL arenas
