= Alexei Murygin =

Russian ice hockey player (1986–2026)

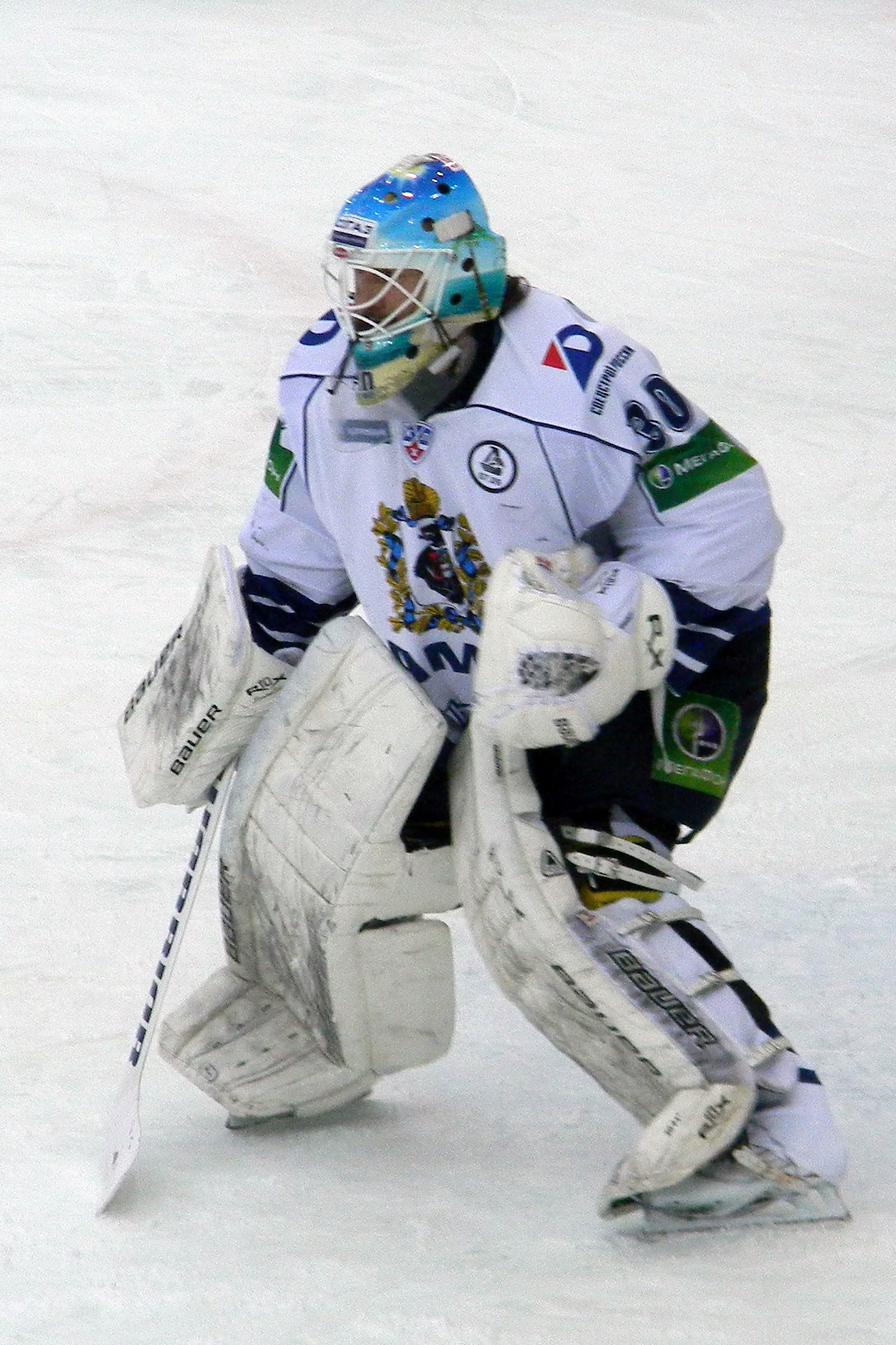
- Murygin in 2012
- Born: 16 November 1986 Khabarovsk, Russian SFSR, USSR
- Died: 31 July 2026 (aged 39)
- Height: 5 ft 11 in (180 cm)
- Weight: 192 lb (87 kg; 13 st 10 lb)
- Position: Goaltender
- Caught: Left
- Played for: Amur Khabarovsk; Metallurg Magnitogorsk; Lokomotiv Yaroslavl; Avangard Omsk; Torpedo Nizhny Novgorod; Neftekhimik Nizhnekamsk; Kunlun Red Star
- Playing career: 2005–2023

Alexei Gennadyevich Murygin (Russian: Алексей Геннадьевич Мурыгин; 16 November 1986 – 31 July 2026) was a Russian professional ice hockey goaltender. He played under contract with Kunlun Red Star in the Kontinental Hockey League (KHL).

== Playing career ==
Murygin began his professional career with Amur Khabarovsk, debuting in the Russian Superleague (RSL) during the 2006–07 season, and later made his first Kontinental Hockey League (KHL) appearance in the 2009–10 campaign.

During the 2015–16 season, Murygin established a KHL shutout streak record by going 302 minutes and 11 seconds without conceding a goal. This record was eventually surpassed by Timur Bilyalov.

In 2019, Murygin was diagnosed with tonsillar cancer. Significantly, his team did not cover the cost of his treatment, as the illness was not classified as work-related.

In 2021, it was revealed that Murygin had successfully overcome cancer and was aiming to return to the KHL. Preparing for his 12th KHL season, he signed a one-year deal with Torpedo Nizhny Novgorod on 12 August 2021, taking on the role of backup goaltender for the team.

On 6 June 2022, Murygin signed a one-year contract as a free agent with HC Neftekhimik Nizhnekamsk, marking his sixth KHL team. However, after posting a .809 save percentage over three games, he was released on 22 September 2022. On 11 November 2022, Murygin secured a contract with Kunlun Red Star.

In 2024, Murygin took on a coaching position with MHK Atlant Mytishchi of the MHL, serving as the team's goaltending coach.

== Death ==
Murygin died on 31 July 2026, at the age of 39. It was caused by a return of the same tonsil cancer that he had previously defeated after his 2019 diagnosis.
