= Igor Ustinsky =

Russian ice hockey player (born 1994)

- Born: June 14, 1994 (age 31) Tyumen, Russia
- Height: 5 ft 10 in (178 cm)
- Weight: 198 lb (90 kg; 14 st 2 lb)
- Position: Goaltender
- Catches: Left
- VHL team Former teams: Zauralie Kurgan; Avtomobilist Yekaterinburg
- Playing career: 2014–present

Igor Ustinsky (born June 14, 1994) is a Russian ice hockey goaltender. He is currently playing with Zauralie Kurgan of the Supreme Hockey League (VHL).

Ustinsky was selected by Metallurg Magnitogorsk in the first round (21st overall) of the 2011 KHL Junior Draft. On December 11, 2014, Ustinsky made his Kontinental Hockey League debut playing with Avtomobilist Yekaterinburg during the 2014–15 KHL season.
