= Dmitry Arkhipov (ice hockey) =

Russian ice hockey player (born 1993)

- Born: February 2, 1993 (age 33) Novocheboksarsk, Russia
- Height: 6 ft 3 in (191 cm)
- Weight: 220 lb (100 kg; 15 st 10 lb)
- Position: Forward
- Shoots: Left
- KHL team Former teams: Free Agent; Ak Bars Kazan; HC Sochi
- Playing career: 2012–present

Dmitry Vladimirovich Arkhipov (Russian: Дми́трий Влади́мирович Архи́пов; born February 2, 1993) is a Russian professional ice hockey player. He is currently an unrestricted free agent who most recently played with HC Sochi of the Kontinental Hockey League (KHL).

Arkhipov made his Kontinental Hockey League debut playing with Ak Bars Kazan during the 2014–15 KHL season.

== Awards and honours ==
Award	Year
KHL
Gagarin Cup (Ak Bars Kazan)	2018
