= Vyacheslav Kulyomin =

Russian ice hockey player

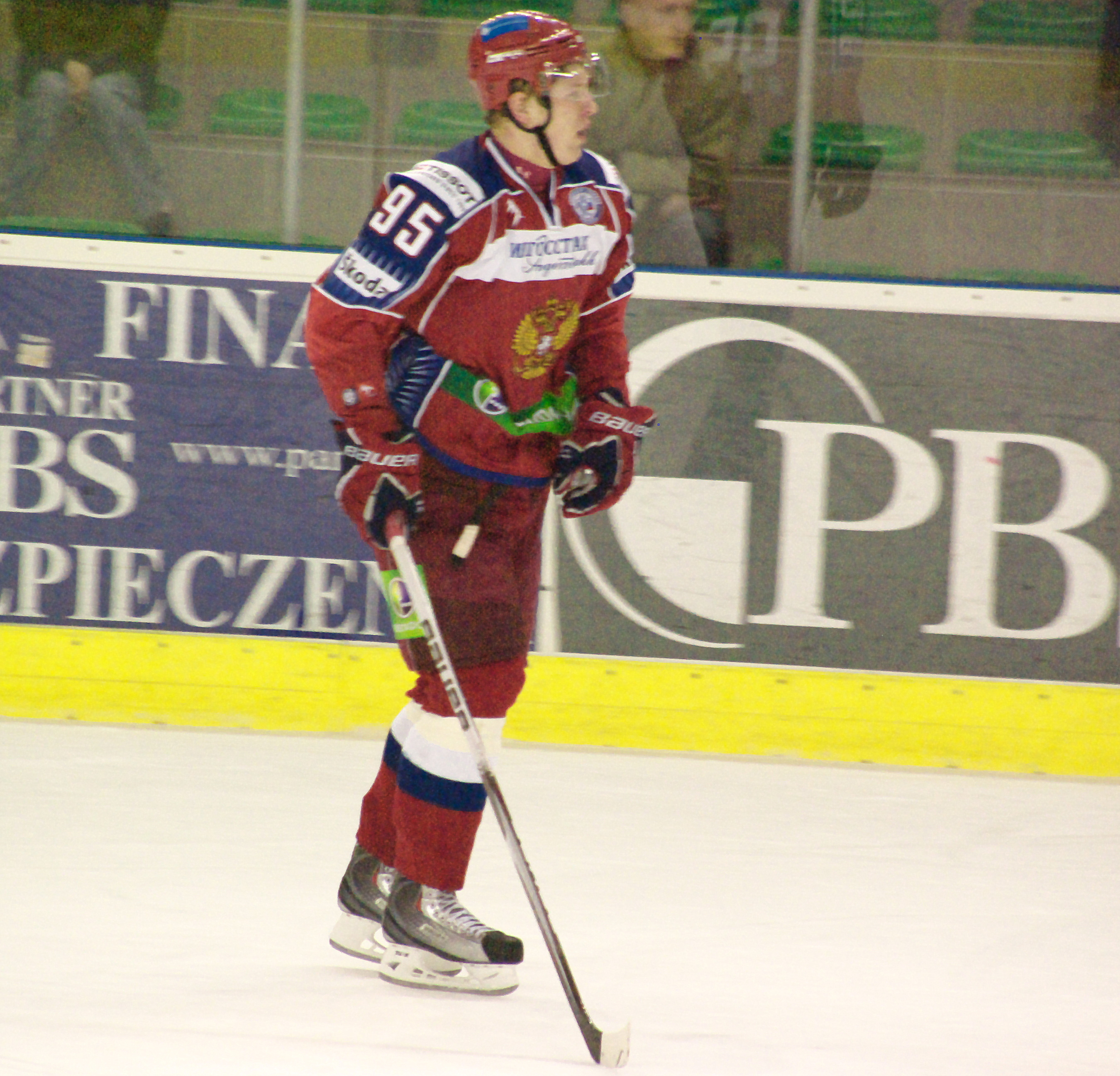
- Born: June 14, 1990 (age 34); Noginsk, Russian SFSR, Soviet Union
- Height: 6 ft 1 in (185 cm)
- Weight: 194 lb (88 kg; 13 st 12 lb)
- Position: Forward
- Shoots: Left
- KHL team Former teams: Free Agent; CSKA Moscow; HC Vityaz; Torpedo Nizhny Novgorod; Dynamo Moscow
- Playing career: 2008–present

Vyacheslav Kulyomin (born June 14, 1990) is a former Russian professional ice hockey forward. He most recently played for HC Dynamo Moscow in the Kontinental Hockey League (KHL).

Kulyomin made his Kontinental Hockey League debut playing with HC CSKA Moscow during the inaugural 2008–09 KHL season. In 2013 he played for Torpedo Nizhny Novgorod of the KHL.
