= Maxim Karpov (ice hockey) =

Russian ice hockey player

- Born: October 19, 1991 (age 34) Chelyabinsk, Russian SFSR, Soviet Union
- Height: 6 ft 2 in (188 cm)
- Weight: 185 lb (84 kg; 13 st 3 lb)
- Position: Forward
- Shoots: Left
- KHL team Former teams: Free agent Traktor Chelyabinsk; Dynamo Moscow; SKA Saint Petersburg; Metallurg Magnitogorsk; Sibir Novosibirsk
- Playing career: 2011–present

Maxim A. Karpov (born October 19, 1991) is a Russian professional ice hockey player who is currently an unrestricted free agent. He most recently played for HC Sibir Novosibirsk in the Kontinental Hockey League (KHL).

== Playing career ==
Born in Chelyabinsk, Russia, Karpov joined Mechel Chelyabinsk of the Russia 3 league in 2006–07 for one game. He played his first season with Mechel the following year and played with Mechel through the 2011–12 season, playing for the organization in the Russia 3, Russia 2, VHL and MHL leagues. In 2012, Karpov joined Traktor Chelyabinsk of the KHL for one season before moving on the Dynamo Moscow.

After four seasons with Dynamo, Karpov while still contracted was granted free agent status from the KHL following the 2016–17 season, due to the club's debt on July 4, 2017. He promptly signed a one-year contract with reigning champions, SKA Saint Petersburg, the following day on July 5, 2017.

As an impending free agent from SKA, Karpov was traded to Amur Khabarovsk before he moved to fellow KHL outfit Metallurg Magnitogorsk, signing a two-year contract on 2 June 2020.

After helping Metallurg capture the Gagarin Cup during his final season under contract with the club, Karpov left as a free agent to sign a two-year contract with HC Sibir Novosibirsk on 5 August 2024.

== Awards and honors ==
Award	Year
KHL
Gagarin Cup (Metallurg Magnitogorsk)	2024
