= Yury Petrov (ice hockey) =

Russian ice hockey player

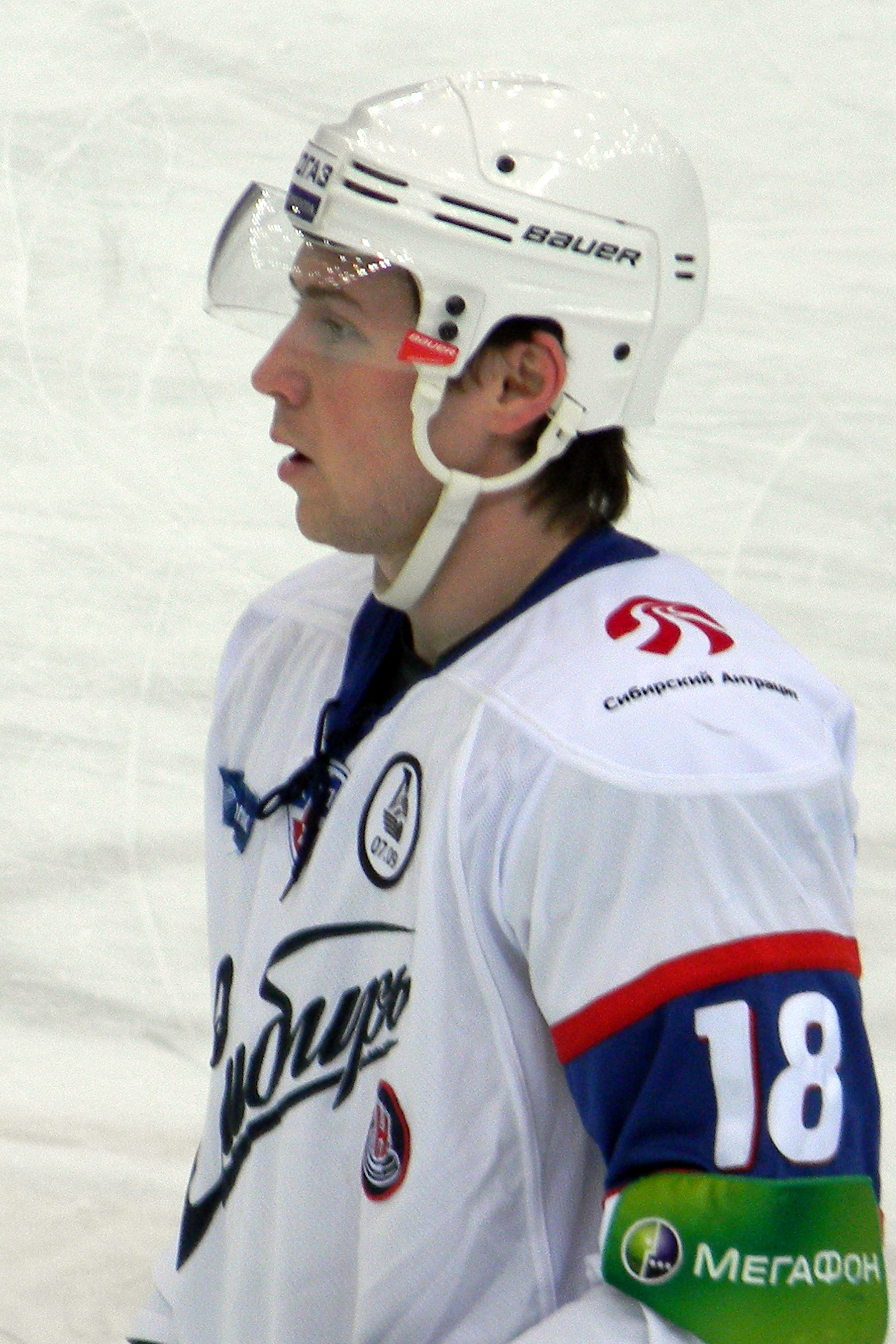
- Yuri Petrov
- Born: March 30, 1984 (age 40); Tolyatti, Russian SFSR
- Height: 5 ft 9 in (175 cm)
- Weight: 174 lb (79 kg; 12 st 6 lb)
- Position: Forward
- Shoots: Left
- KHL team Former teams: Free Agent; Traktor Chelyabinsk; Lada Togliatti; Sibir Novosibirsk; Lokomotiv Yaroslavl; Avangard Omsk; Admiral Vladivostok
- Playing career: 2002–present

Yury A. Petrov (born March 30, 1984) is a Russian professional ice hockey forward who is currently an unrestricted free agent. He most recently played for Admiral Vladivostok in the Kontinental Hockey League (KHL).

Petrov made his KHL debut playing with Lada Togliatti during the 2008–09 season. Petrov returned to Lada in the 2014–15 season, after previously playing with HC Sibir Novosibirsk and Lokomotiv Yaroslavl.
