= 2009–10 JHL season =

Russian ice hockey league season

The 2009–10 MHL season was the first season of the Junior Hockey League, the junior ice hockey league in Russia. The Steel Foxes Magnitogorsk won the league title.

== Regular season ==
=== Western Conference ===
R		GP	W	OTW	OTL	L	GF	GA	Pts
1.	MHK Krylya Sovetov Moscow	66	33	8	4	21	228	163	119
2.	Loko Yaroslavl	66	30	10	8	18	205	164	118
3.	SKA-1946 Saint Petersburg	66	33	6	5	22	203	163	116
4.	CSKA Red Army	66	31	9	3	23	287	220	114
5.	Sheriff Balashiha	66	30	5	7	24	188	188	107
6.	MHK Dynamo Moscow	66	29	5	6	26	224	215	103
7.	Almas Cherepovets	66	28	5	9	24	238	239	103
8.	Russian Knights	66	29	3	8	26	237	242	101
9.	MHK Spartak Moscow	66	28	4	3	31	243	243	95
10.	Chaika Nizhny Novogorod	66	23	8	9	26	181	199	94
11.	Mystichi Atlanty	66	19	6	6	35	209	259	75
12.	Khimik Voskresensk	66	11	3	4	48	157	305	43

=== Eastern Conference ===
R		GP	W	OTW	OTL	L	GF	GA	Pts
1.	Steel Foxes Magnitogorsk	54	41	4	4	5	258	119	135
2.	Tolpar Ufa	54	34	5	1	14	221	131	113
3.	Avto Yekaterinburg	54	33	2	4	15	202	163	107
4.	Reactor Nizhnekamsk	54	28	3	4	19	192	189	94
5.	Bars Kazan	54	21	9	3	21	150	144	84
6.	Omsk Hawks	54	17	4	8	25	129	163	67
7.	Polar Bears Chelyabinsk	54	17	5	1	31	124	166	62
8.	Kusneztsk Bears	54	17	3	2	32	175	194	59
9.	Siberian Snipers	54	12	3	6	33	135	211	48
10.	Lada Togliatti	54	11	1	6	36	125	231	41

== Playoffs ==
1/8 Finals
E1	Steel Foxes Magnitogorsk	3
W8	Russian Knights	0
W4	CSKA Red Army	2
E5	Bars Kazan	3
E3	Avto Yekaterinburg	3
W6	MHK Dynamo Moscow	0
W2	Loko Yaroslavl	1
E7	Polar Bears Chelyabinsk	3
E2	Tolpar Ufa	3
W7	Almas Cherepovets	0
W3	SKA 1946 Saint Petersburg	2
E6	Omsk Hawks	3
E4	Reactor Nizhnekamsk	3
W5	Sheriff Balaschicha	0
W1	MHK Krylya Sovetov Moscow	1
E8	Kuznetsk Bears	3

Quarterfinals
E1	Steel Foxes Magnitogorsk	3
E5	Bars Kazan	1
E3	Avto Yekaterinburg	1
E7	Polar Bears Chelyabinsk	3
E2	Tolpar Ufa	3
E6	Omsk Hawks	0
E4	Reactor Nizhnekamsk	1
E8	Kuznetsk Bears	3

Semifinals
E1	Steel Foxes Magnitogorsk	3
E7	Polar Bears Chelyabinsk	1
E2	Tolpar Ufa	2
E8	Kuznetsk Bears	3

Final
E1	Steel Foxes Magnitogorsk	3
E8	Kuznetsk Bears	1
