= 2015–16 KHL season =

- League: Kontinental Hockey League
- Sport: Ice hockey
- Duration: 24 August 2015 – 19 April 2016
- Games: 60
- Teams: 28

Regular season
- Continental Cup winner: CSKA Moscow
- Season MVP: Sergei Mozyakin (Metallurg Magnitogorsk)
- Top scorer: Sergei Mozyakin (Metallurg Magnitogorsk)

Playoffs
- Finals champions: Metallurg Magnitogorsk
- Runners-up: CSKA Moscow
- Finals MVP: Sergei Mozyakin (Metallurg Magnitogorsk)

KHL seasons
- ← 2014–15 2016–17 →

The 2015–16 KHL season was the eighth season of the Kontinental Hockey League. The season started on 24 August 2015 with the Opening Cup between defending champions SKA Saint Petersburg and last year's Continental Cup winners CSKA Moscow, replacing Ak Bars Kazan, the previous season's Gagarin Cup finalists.

== Team changes ==
Spartak Moscow returned to the league prior to this season. It was also announced by KHL President Dmitry Chernyshenko that Atlant Moscow Oblast would not participate in the league this season due to financial problems.

== Divisions and regular season format ==
In this season, each team played every other team once at home and once on the road, giving a total of 54 games (27 at home, 27 on the road), plus 6 additional games (3 at home, 3 on the road) played by each team against rival clubs from its own conference. Thus, each team played a total of 60 games in the regular season.

How the teams are divided into divisions and conferences is shown in the table below.

Western Conference	Eastern Conference

Bobrov Division	Tarasov Division	Kharlamov Division	Chernyshev Division
(Belarus) Dinamo Minsk	(Russia) CSKA Moscow	(Russia) Ak Bars Kazan	(Russia) Admiral Vladivostok
(Latvia) Dinamo Riga	(Russia) Dynamo Moscow	(Russia) Avtomobilist Yekaterinburg	(Russia) Amur Khabarovsk
(Finland) Jokerit	(Russia) HC Sochi	(Russia) Lada Togliatti	(Russia) Avangard Omsk
(Croatia) Medveščak Zagreb	(Russia) Lokomotiv Yaroslavl	(Russia) Metallurg Magnitogorsk	(Kazakhstan) Barys Astana
(Russia) SKA Saint Petersburg	(Russia) Severstal Cherepovets	(Russia) Neftekhimik Nizhnekamsk	(Russia) Metallurg Novokuznetsk
(Slovakia) Slovan Bratislava	(Russia) Torpedo Nizhny Novgorod	(Russia) Traktor Chelyabinsk	(Russia) Salavat Yulaev Ufa
(Russia) Spartak Moscow	(Russia) Vityaz Podolsk	(Russia) Yugra Khanty-Mansiysk	(Russia) Sibir Novosibirsk

== League standings ==
=== Western Conference ===
Pos	Team	Pld	W	OTW	OTL	L	GF	GA	GD	Pts	Qualification
1	CSKA Moscow	60	38	5	3	14	163	87	+76	127	Advance to Gagarin Cup Playoffs (Note: Two winners of divisions hold the first two places in the conference)
2	Jokerit	60	31	5	5	19	167	140	+27	108	Advance to Gagarin Cup Playoffs
3	Lokomotiv Yaroslavl	60	37	6	2	15	155	94	+61	125	Advance to Gagarin Cup Playoffs
4	HC Sochi	60	30	4	10	16	175	149	+26	108	Advance to Gagarin Cup Playoffs
5	Dynamo Moscow	60	27	8	8	17	167	126	+41	105	Advance to Gagarin Cup Playoffs
6	SKA Saint Petersburg	60	27	6	7	20	176	149	+27	100	Advance to Gagarin Cup Playoffs
7	Torpedo Nizhny Novgorod	60	23	10	11	16	163	137	+26	100	Advance to Gagarin Cup Playoffs
8	Slovan Bratislava	60	21	11	4	24	154	148	+6	89	Advance to Gagarin Cup Playoffs
9	Dinamo Minsk	60	20	7	9	24	147	168	−21	83	
10	Medveščak Zagreb	60	19	6	9	26	144	172	−28	78	
11	Spartak Moscow	60	20	5	7	28	139	172	−33	77	
12	Dinamo Riga	60	17	8	8	27	129	151	−22	75	
13	Vityaz Podolsk	60	17	8	3	32	129	166	−37	70	
14	Severstal Cherepovets	60	12	8	6	34	124	167	−43	58	

Updated to match(es) played on 18 February 2016. Source: KHL
Rules for classification: 1) points; 2) a higher number of wins in the regular time; 3) a higher number of wins in overtime and shootouts; 4) goal difference; 5) number of goals scored; 6) drawing of lots.

=== Eastern Conference ===
Pos	Team	Pld	W	OTW	OTL	L	GF	GA	GD	Pts	Qualification
1	Avangard Omsk	60	27	6	13	14	156	120	+36	106	Advance to Gagarin Cup Playoffs (Note: Two winners of divisions hold the first two places in the conference)
2	Metallurg Magnitogorsk	60	25	13	2	20	180	138	+42	103	Advance to Gagarin Cup Playoffs
3	Sibir Novosibirsk	60	24	12	9	15	155	133	+22	105	Advance to Gagarin Cup Playoffs
4	Salavat Yulaev Ufa	60	29	5	4	22	179	156	+23	101	Advance to Gagarin Cup Playoffs
5	Ak Bars Kazan	60	25	6	9	20	143	127	+16	96	Advance to Gagarin Cup Playoffs
6	Admiral Vladivostok	60	25	8	4	23	157	163	−6	95	Advance to Gagarin Cup Playoffs
7	Avtomobilist Yekaterinburg	60	21	9	11	19	145	158	−13	92	Advance to Gagarin Cup Playoffs
8	Neftekhimik Nizhnekamsk	60	20	7	12	21	130	135	−5	86	Advance to Gagarin Cup Playoffs
9	Barys Astana	60	21	8	6	25	167	184	−17	85	
10	Traktor Chelyabinsk	60	17	12	8	23	132	151	−19	83	
11	Yugra Khanty-Mansiysk	60	19	6	3	32	120	178	−58	72	
12	Amur Khabarovsk	60	17	6	6	31	112	143	−31	69	
13	Lada Togliatti	60	17	5	8	30	120	153	−33	69	
14	Metallurg Novokuznetsk	60	13	1	14	32	128	191	−63	55	

Updated to match(es) played on 18 February 2016. Source: KHL
Rules for classification: 1) points; 2) a higher number of wins in the regular time; 3) a higher number of wins in overtime and shootouts; 4) goal difference; 5) number of goals scored; 6) drawing of lots.

== Gagarin Cup Playoffs ==
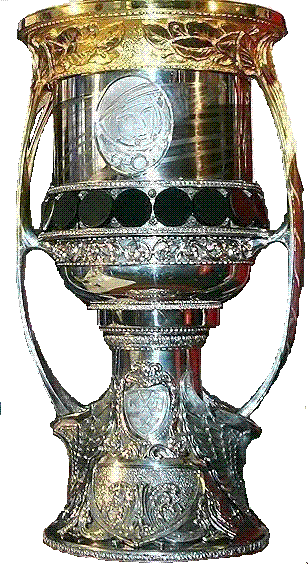
Gagarin Cup

The playoffs started on 21 February 2016 with the top eight teams from each of the conferences, and ended with the last game of the Gagarin Cup final on 19 April 2016.

=== Bracket ===
Conference Quarterfinals	Conference Semifinals
1	(Russia) Avangard	4
8	(Russia) Neftekhimik	0
1	(Russia) Avangard	3
4	(Russia) Salavat Yulaev	4
2	(Russia) Metallurg Mg	4
7	(Russia) Avtomobilist	2
Eastern Conference
3	(Russia) Sibir	4
6	(Russia) Admiral	1
2	(Russia) Metallurg Mg	4
3	(Russia) Sibir	1
4	(Russia) Salavat Yulaev	4
5	(Russia) Ak Bars	3
1	(Russia) CSKA	4
8	(Slovakia) Slovan	0
1	(Russia) CSKA	4
7	(Russia) Torpedo	1
2	(Finland) Jokerit	2
7	(Russia) Torpedo	4
Western Conference
3	(Russia) Lokomotiv	1
6	(Russia) SKA	4
5	(Russia) Dynamo Msk	2
6	(Russia) SKA	4
4	(Russia) HC Sochi	0
5	(Russia) Dynamo Msk	4

Conference Finals
4	(Russia) Salavat Yulaev	1
2	(Russia) Metallurg Mg	4
1	(Russia) CSKA	4
6	(Russia) SKA	0

Gagarin Cup Finals
2	(Russia) Metallurg Mg	4
1	(Russia) CSKA	3

== Final standings ==
Rank	Team
1	(Russia) Metallurg Magnitogorsk
2	(Russia) CSKA Moscow
3	(Russia) Salavat Yulaev Ufa
4	(Russia) SKA Saint Petersburg
5	(Russia) Avangard Omsk
6	(Russia) Dynamo Moscow
7	(Russia) Sibir Novosibirsk
8	(Russia) Torpedo Nizhny Novgorod
9	(Russia) Lokomotiv Yaroslavl
10	(Finland) Jokerit
11	(Russia) HC Sochi
12	(Russia) Ak Bars Kazan
13	(Russia) Admiral Vladivostok
14	(Russia) Avtomobilist Yekaterinburg
15	(Slovakia) Slovan Bratislava
16	(Russia) Neftekhimik Nizhnekamsk
17	(Kazakhstan) Barys Astana
18	(Belarus) Dinamo Minsk
19	(Russia) Traktor Chelyabinsk
20	(Croatia) Medveščak Zagreb
21	(Russia) Spartak Moscow
22	(Latvia) Dinamo Riga
23	(Russia) Yugra Khanty-Mansiysk
24	(Russia) Vityaz Podolsk
25	(Russia) Amur Khabarovsk
26	(Russia) Lada Togliatti
27	(Russia) Severstal Cherepovets
28	(Russia) Metallurg Novokuznetsk

== Player statistics ==
=== Scoring leaders ===
As of 18 February 2016

Player	Team	GP	G	A	Pts	+/–	PIM
(Russia) Sergei Mozyakin	Metallurg Magnitogorsk	57	32	35	67	+11	0
(Russia) Alexander Radulov	CSKA Moscow	53	23	42	65	+28	73
(United States) Brandon Bochenski	Barys Astana	60	20	41	61	+16	48
(Russia) Vadim Shipachyov	SKA Saint Petersburg	54	17	43	60	−8	63
(Sweden) Linus Omark	Salavat Yulaev Ufa	60	18	39	57	+12	40
(Canada) Matt Ellison	Dinamo Minsk	54	26	29	55	−10	54
(Russia) Danis Zaripov	Metallurg Magnitogorsk	60	22	32	54	+9	26
(Kazakhstan) Nigel Dawes	Barys Astana	55	31	22	53	+15	16
(Canada) Justin Azevedo	Ak Bars Kazan	59	17	36	53	+6	26
(Czech Republic) Jan Kovář	Metallurg Magnitogorsk	58	20	32	52	+7	61

Source: KHL

=== Leading goaltenders ===
As of 18 February 2016

Player	Team	GP	Min	W	L	SOP	GA	SO	SV%	GAA
(Russia) Ilya Sorokin	CSKA Moscow	28	1638:53	17	7	4	29	10	.953	1.06
(Russia) Alexei Murygin	Lokomotiv Yaroslavl	34	1962:29	22	8	3	37	13	.954	1.13
(Russia) Stanislav Galimov	CSKA/Ak Bars	28	1669:11	18	6	4	42	7	.938	1.51
(Sweden) Viktor Fasth	CSKA Moscow	20	1122:04	13	4	1	31	3	.921	1.66
(Russia) Alexander Yeryomenko	Dynamo Moscow	23	1392:08	11	4	7	41	2	.936	1.77

Source: KHL

== Awards ==
=== Players of the Month ===
Best KHL players of each month.

Month	Goaltender	Defense	Forward	Rookie
September	(Russia) Alexei Murygin (Lokomotiv Yaroslavl)	(Canada) Mat Robinson (Dynamo Moscow)	(Russia) Sergei Mozyakin (Metallurg Magnitogorsk)	(Russia) Roman Manukhov (Metallurg Novokuznetsk)
October	(Czech Republic) Alexander Salák (Sibir Novosibirsk)	(Russia) Mikhail Pashnin (Lokomotiv Yaroslavl)	(Canada) Nigel Dawes (Barys Astana)	(Russia) Artyom Zub (Amur Khabarovsk)
November	(Canada) Danny Taylor (Medveščak Zagreb)	(Sweden) Staffan Kronwall (Lokomotiv Yaroslavl)	(Russia) Anatoly Golyshev (Avtomobilist Yekaterinburg)	(Russia) Alexander Polunin (Lokomotiv Yaroslavl)
December	(Czech Republic) Dominik Furch (Avangard Omsk)	(Canada) (Kazakhstan) Kevin Dallman (Barys Astana)	(Russia) Danis Zaripov (Metallurg Magnitogorsk)	(Russia) Vladislav Gavrikov (Lokomotiv Yaroslavl)
January	(Russia) Ilya Sorokin (CSKA Moscow)	(Canada) Mat Robinson (Dynamo Moscow)	(Russia) Vadim Shipachyov (SKA St. Petersburg)	(Russia) Igor Ustinsky (Avtomobilist Yekaterinburg)
February	(Russia) Alexander Yeryomenko (Dynamo Moscow)	(Russia) Anton Belov (SKA St. Petersburg)	(Denmark) Peter Regin (Jokerit)	(Russia) Artur Lauta (Avangard Omsk)
March	(Russia) Ilya Sorokin (CSKA Moscow)	(Russia) Denis Denisov (CSKA Moscow)	(Russia) Sergei Mozyakin (Metallurg Magnitogorsk)	(Kazakhstan) (Russia) Yuri Sergiyenko (Torpedo Nizhny Novgorod)
April				
