= 2019 Gagarin Cup playoffs =

Tournament details
- Dates: 25 February – 19 April 2019
- Teams: 16

Final positions
- Champions: (Russia) CSKA Moscow
- Runners-up: (Russia) Avangard Omsk

Tournament statistics
- Scoring leader(s): (Russia) Mikhail Grigorenko (CSKA Moscow) (Note: Grigorenko and Teemu Hartikainen (Salavat Yulaev Ufa) finished tied on 21 points; Grigorenko's tally of 13 goals and 8 assists compared to Hartikainen's 8 goals and 13 assists gave him the tie-break per Article 74.1 (c) of the KHL's Sporting Regulations.) (21)

The 2019 Gagarin Cup playoffs of the Kontinental Hockey League (KHL) began on 25 February 2019, with the top eight teams from each of the conferences, following the conclusion of the 2018–19 KHL regular season. The playoffs ended on 19 April 2019, when Continental Cup winners CSKA Moscow became the first team to win the Gagarin Cup finals in a series sweep, defeating Avangard Omsk in four games to win their first Gagarin Cup, after two previous Finals defeats.

== Playoff seeds ==
After the regular season, the standard 16 teams qualified for the playoffs.

=== Western Conference ===
The regular season winners and Continental Cup winners were CSKA Moscow with 106 points.

Pos	Team	Pld	W	OTW	OTL	L	GF	GA	GD	Pts
1	CSKA Moscow (Y, Z)	62	43	10	0	9	191	75	+116	106
2	SKA Saint Petersburg (X)	62	45	4	5	8	209	80	+129	103
3	Lokomotiv Yaroslavl	62	34	6	6	16	159	118	+41	86
4	Jokerit	62	32	5	6	19	197	164	+33	80
5	Dynamo Moscow	62	27	6	6	23	153	139	+14	72
6	HC Sochi	62	19	9	10	24	145	155	−10	66
7	Spartak Moscow	62	21	7	8	26	156	158	−2	64
8	Vityaz Podolsk	62	23	5	7	27	134	169	−35	63

Source: KHL
(X) Won division; (Y) Won conference; (Z) Won Continental Cup

=== Eastern Conference ===
Avtomobilist Yekaterinburg were the Eastern Conference regular season winners with 95 points.

Pos	Team	Pld	W	OTW	OTL	L	GF	GA	GD	Pts
1	Avtomobilist Yekaterinburg (Y)	62	39	8	1	14	191	125	+66	95
2	Barys Astana (X)	62	28	10	10	14	190	149	+41	86
3	Metallurg Magnitogorsk	62	35	6	2	19	182	132	+50	84
4	Avangard Omsk	62	29	10	5	18	177	133	+44	83
5	Ak Bars Kazan	62	34	4	6	18	165	139	+26	82
6	Salavat Yulaev Ufa	62	24	7	10	21	158	140	+18	72
7	Torpedo Nizhny Novgorod	62	20	7	10	25	176	193	−17	64
8	Traktor Chelyabinsk	62	18	9	4	31	102	151	−49	58

Source: KHL
(X) Won division; (Y) Won conference

== Playoff bracket ==
In each round, the highest remaining seed in each conference is matched against the lowest remaining seed. The higher-seeded team is awarded home ice advantage. In the Gagarin Cup Finals, home ice is determined based on regular season points. Each best-of-seven series follows a 2–2–1–1–1 format: the higher-seeded team plays at home for games one and two (and games five and seven, if necessary), and the lower-seeded team is at home for games three and four (and game six, if necessary).

The 2019 Gagarin Cup playoffs started on 25 February 2019, with the top eight teams from each of the conferences, and finished on 19 April 2019.

Conference Quarterfinals	Conference Semifinals
1	(Russia) Avtomobilist	4
8	(Russia) Traktor	0
1	(Russia) Avtomobilist	1
6	(Russia) Salavat Yulaev	4
2	(Kazakhstan) Barys	4
7	(Russia) Torpedo	3
Eastern Conference
3	(Russia) Metallurg	2
6	(Russia) Salavat Yulaev	4
2	(Kazakhstan) Barys	1
4	(Russia) Avangard	4
4	(Russia) Avangard	4
5	(Russia) Ak Bars	0
1	(Russia) CSKA	4
8	(Russia) Vityaz	0
1	(Russia) CSKA	4
5	(Russia) Dynamo	1
2	(Russia) SKA	4
7	(Russia) Spartak	2
Western Conference
3	(Russia) Lokomotiv	4
6	(Russia) Sochi	2
2	(Russia) SKA	4
3	(Russia) Lokomotiv	1
4	(Finland) Jokerit	2
5	(Russia) Dynamo	4

Conference Finals
6	(Russia) Salavat Yulaev	2
4	(Russia) Avangard	4
1	(Russia) CSKA	4
2	(Russia) SKA	3

Gagarin Cup Finals
E4	(Russia) Avangard	0
W1	(Russia) CSKA	4

== First round ==
=== Eastern Conference first round ===
==== (1) Avtomobilist Yekaterinburg vs. (8) Traktor Chelyabinsk ====
Avtomobilist Yekaterinburg finished first in the Eastern Conference earning 95 points. Traktor Chelyabinsk finished as the Eastern Conference's eighth seed, earning 58 points, and averaging 1.64 goals per game, the lowest recorded tally for any playoff-qualifying team. This was the first playoff meeting between the two teams; Avtomobilist Yekaterinburg won all four games in this year's regular season series.

26 February	Avtomobilist Yekaterinburg	3–0	Traktor Chelyabinsk	KRK Uralets	Recap
Nigel Dawes (1; PPG) – 13:13; Dan Sexton (1; PPG) – 14:52		First period	No scoring
Anatoly Golyshev (1) – 01:17		Second period	No scoring
No scoring		Third period	No scoring
Jakub Kovář (26 shots / 26 saves)		Goalie stats	Alexander Sudnitsin (27 shots / 24 saves)

28 February	Avtomobilist Yekaterinburg	4–2	Traktor Chelyabinsk	KRK Uralets	Recap
Andrei Obidin (1) – 02:41		First period	19:36 – Grigory Zheldakov (1)
Nigel Dawes (2; PPG) – 08:09; Anatoly Golyshev (2; SHG) – 11:46		Second period	No scoring
Alexander Kucheryavenko (1; PPG) – 17:16		Third period	18:25 – Anton Glinkin (1; PPG)
Jakub Kovář (27 shots / 25 saves)		Goalie stats	Vasily Demchenko (28 shots / 24 saves)

2 March	Traktor Chelyabinsk	1–2	OT	Avtomobilist Yekaterinburg	Traktor Ice Arena	Recap
No scoring		First period		No scoring
Christian Thomas (1) – 00:22		Second period		No scoring
No scoring		Third period		02:15 – Andrei Obidin (2)
No scoring		First overtime period		00:54 – Vyacheslav Litovchenko (1)
Alexander Sudnitsin (35 shots / 33 saves)		Goalie stats		Jakub Kovář (32 shots / 31 saves)

4 March	Traktor Chelyabinsk	3–4	Avtomobilist Yekaterinburg	Traktor Ice Arena	Recap
Anton Glinkin (2) – 01:14; Igor Isayev (1) – 05:16		First period	No scoring
No scoring		Second period	11:38 – Ilya Krikunov (1; PPG); 12:03 – Vyacheslav Litovchenko (2; PPG)
Alexander Sharov (1) – 01:00		Third period	02:27 – Dan Sexton (2); 04:18 – Vyacheslav Litovchenko (3)
Vasily Demchenko (44 shots / 40 saves)		Goalie stats	Jakub Kovář (25 shots / 22 saves)

Avtomobilist Yekaterinburg win 4–0

==== (2) Barys Astana vs. (7) Torpedo Nizhny Novgorod ====
Barys Astana finished second in the Eastern Conference earning 86 points. Torpedo Nizhny Novgorod finished as the Eastern Conference's seventh seed, earning 64 points. This was the first playoff meeting between the two teams, and they split their two-game regular season series.

26 February	Barys Astana	4–1	Torpedo Nizhny Novgorod	Barys Arena	Recap
No scoring		First period	12:23 – Robert Sabolič (1; PPG)
André Petersson (1; PPG) – 19:03		Second period	No scoring
Brandon Bochenski (1; PPG) – 01:28; Matt Frattin (1) – 03:25; Brandon Bochenski (2) – 16:43		Third period	No scoring
Henrik Karlsson (19 shots / 18 saves)		Goalie stats	Barry Brust (35 shots / 31 saves)

28 February	Barys Astana	5–4	OT	Torpedo Nizhny Novgorod	Barys Arena	Recap
No scoring		First period		01:41 – Anton Volchenkov (1); 18:18 – Mikhail Varnakov (1)
Anton Sagadeyev (1) – 08:13; Dmitry Shevchenko (1) – 12:30		Second period		00:52 – Robert Sabolič (2); 06:25 – Daniil Ilyin (1)
Darren Dietz (1) – 14:28; Matt Frattin (2; PPG) – 18:18		Third period		No scoring
Roman Starchenko (1) – 01:40		First overtime period		No scoring
Henrik Karlsson (11 shots / 8 saves); Dominik Hrachovina (9 shots / 8 saves)		Goalie stats		Barry Brust (55 shots / 50 saves)

2 March	Torpedo Nizhny Novgorod	3–1	Barys Astana	Trade Union Sport Palace	Recap
No scoring		First period	No scoring
Denis Barantsev (1) – 13:33; Philip Holm (1; SHG) – 18:03		Second period	09:53 – Matt Frattin (3; PPG)
Denis Barantsev (2; ENG) – 19:56		Third period	No scoring
Barry Brust (31 shots / 30 saves)		Goalie stats	Henrik Karlsson (20 shots / 18 saves)

4 March	Torpedo Nizhny Novgorod	5–4	2OT	Barys Astana	Trade Union Sport Palace	Recap
No scoring		First period		07:16 – Patrice Cormier (1); 14:10 – Pavel Akolzin (1); 16:43 – Matt Frattin (4; PPG)
Anton Volchenkov (2) – 10:51; Mikhail Varnakov (2; PPG) – 16:49		Second period		No scoring
Damir Zhafyarov (1) – 17:32; Denis Parshin (1) – 18:39		Third period		09:06 – Curtis Valk (1)
Vladimir Galuzin (1; PPG) – 15:14		Second overtime period		No scoring
Barry Brust (40 shots / 36 saves)		Goalie stats		Dominik Hrachovina (63 shots / 58 saves)

6 March	Barys Astana	3–1	Torpedo Nizhny Novgorod	Barys Arena	Recap
Matt Frattin (5) – 06:46; Brandon Bochenski (3) – 11:43		First period	No scoring
André Petersson (2; PPG) – 05:08		Second period	No scoring
No scoring		Third period	01:25 – Robert Sabolič (3)
Henrik Karlsson (23 shots / 22 saves)		Goalie stats	Barry Brust (28 shots / 25 saves)

8 March	Torpedo Nizhny Novgorod	3–1	Barys Astana	Trade Union Sport Palace	Recap
Denis Parshin (2) – 12:41		First period	No scoring
Artyom Alyayev (1) – 10:36; Vladimir Galuzin (2; PPG) – 14:15		Second period	08:17 – Pavel Akolzin (2)
No scoring		Third period	No scoring
Barry Brust (41 shots / 40 saves)		Goalie stats	Henrik Karlsson (36 shots / 33 saves)

10 March	Barys Astana	3–2	Torpedo Nizhny Novgorod	Barys Arena	Recap
Darren Dietz (2) – 00:54		First period	16:40 – Anton Volchenkov (3)
Matt Frattin (6) – 12:16		Second period	16:36 – Dmitri Semin (1)
Darren Dietz (3) – 11:55		Third period	No scoring
Henrik Karlsson (28 shots / 26 saves)		Goalie stats	Barry Brust (36 shots / 33 saves)

Barys Astana win 4–3

==== (3) Metallurg Magnitogorsk vs. (6) Salavat Yulaev Ufa ====
Metallurg Magnitogorsk finished third in the Eastern Conference earning 84 points. Salavat Yulaev Ufa finished as the Eastern Conference's sixth seed, earning 72 points. This was the fifth playoff meeting between the two teams, with the previous four series having been shared; Metallurg Magnitogorsk won the most recent series during the 2016 Gagarin Cup playoffs. This year's two-game regular season series was also shared.

25 February	Metallurg Magnitogorsk	2–1	2OT	Salavat Yulaev Ufa	Arena Metallurg	Recap
No scoring		First period		No scoring
Denis Platonov (1) – 02:26		Second period		No scoring
No scoring		Third period		03:48 – Teemu Hartikainen (1)
Nick Shore (1) – 19:20		Second overtime period		No scoring
Vasily Koshechkin (48 shots / 47 saves)		Goalie stats		Juha Metsola (48 shots / 46 saves)

27 February	Metallurg Magnitogorsk	1–4	Salavat Yulaev Ufa	Arena Metallurg	Recap
No scoring		First period	03:25 – Linus Omark (1); 08:49 – Maxim Mayorov (1)
No scoring		Second period	13:37 – Teemu Hartikainen (2); 17:19 – Joonas Kemppainen (1; PPG)
Michal Bulíř (1; PPG) – 12:55		Third period	No scoring
Vasily Koshechkin (23 shots / 20 saves); Artyom Zagidulin (12 shots / 11 saves)		Goalie stats	Juha Metsola (25 shots / 24 saves)

1 March	Salavat Yulaev Ufa	5–1	Metallurg Magnitogorsk	Ufa Arena	Recap
Linus Omark (2) – 02:55; Teemu Hartikainen (3; PPG) – 03:20; Alexander Kadeikin (1) – 04:00; Maxim Rybin (1) – 12:40; Joonas Kemppainen (2) – 19:50		First period	No scoring
No scoring		Second period	No scoring
No scoring		Third period	17:23 – Dmitry Zaitsev (1)
Juha Metsola (39 shots / 38 saves)		Goalie stats	Vasily Koshechkin (3 shots / 0 saves); Artyom Zagidulin (20 shots / 18 saves)

3 March	Salavat Yulaev Ufa	1–2	OT	Metallurg Magnitogorsk	Ufa Arena	Recap
No scoring		First period		No scoring
No scoring		Second period		04:49 – Dennis Rasmussen (1)
Vladimir Zharkov (1) – 14:35		Third period		No scoring
No scoring		First overtime period		07:58 – Matt Ellison (1; PPG)
Juha Metsola (34 shots / 32 saves)		Goalie stats		Artyom Zagidulin (33 shots / 32 saves)

5 March	Metallurg Magnitogorsk	1–2	OT	Salavat Yulaev Ufa	Arena Metallurg	Recap
No scoring		First period		No scoring
Matt Ellison (2) – 13:48		Second period		11:36 – Dmitri Kugryshev (1; PPG)
No scoring		Third period		No scoring
No scoring		First overtime period		01:36 – Vladimir Tkachev (1)
Artyom Zagidulin (18 shots / 16 saves)		Goalie stats		Juha Metsola (19 shots / 18 saves)

7 March	Salavat Yulaev Ufa	3–2	OT	Metallurg Magnitogorsk	Ufa Arena	Recap
Teemu Hartikainen (4) – 14:20		First period		No scoring
No scoring		Second period		16:25 – Michal Bulíř (2; PPG); 19:58 – Nick Shore (2)
Teemu Hartikainen (5) – 19:14		Third period		No scoring
Joonas Kemppainen (3) – 11:54		First overtime period		No scoring
Juha Metsola (48 shots / 46 saves)		Goalie stats		Vasily Koshechkin (25 shots / 22 saves)

Salavat Yulaev Ufa win 4–2

==== (4) Avangard Omsk vs. (5) Ak Bars Kazan ====
Avangard Omsk finished fourth in the Eastern Conference earning 83 points. Ak Bars Kazan, the reigning Gagarin Cup champions, finished as the Eastern Conference's fifth seed, one point behind Avangard Omsk. This was the fourth playoff meeting between the two teams with Ak Bars Kazan winning all three previous series, the most recent of which was during the 2017 Gagarin Cup playoffs. This year's two-game regular season series was shared, with both games going to overtime.

In the opening game, a two-goal performance by Sergei Shumakov and a 21-save shutout at home by goaltender Igor Bobkov led Avangard Omsk to a 6–0 win. In the second game, another strong offensive performance coupled with the play of Bobkov gained them a two-game lead, with a 6–3 victory. Despite an early showing by Ak Bars Kazan, Avangard Omsk took a stranglehold in game three on the road on Denis Zernov's second period game-winner, ultimately winning 4–1. Finally, in game four, Shumakov scored all three goals – his first playoffs hat-trick – on the night, as Avangard Omsk swept Ak Bars Kazan in four successive games, marking the first time that the defending champions were beaten in such a manner in the first round of the playoffs.

25 February	Avangard Omsk	6–0	Ak Bars Kazan	Balashikha Arena	Recap
Denis Zernov (1; PPG) – 13:13; Ville Pokka (1) – 16:49		First period	No scoring
Artyom Manukyan (1) – 03:18; Cody Franson (1) – 10:49		Second period	No scoring
Sergei Shumakov (1) – 12:53; Sergei Shumakov (2) – 16:54		Third period	No scoring
Igor Bobkov (21 shots / 21 saves)		Goalie stats	Vladislav Podyapolsky (18 shots / 14 saves); Alexander Sharychenkov (24 shots / 22 saves)

27 February	Avangard Omsk	6–3	Ak Bars Kazan	Balashikha Arena	Recap
Semyon Koshelev (1) – 09:00; Ilya Mikheyev (1; PPG) – 11:07		First period	No scoring
Sergei Shirokov (1) – 06:32; Taylor Beck (1; PPG) – 14:11		Second period	10:39 – Paul Postma (1; PPG); 11:57 – Jiří Sekáč (1; PPG)
Viktor Stålberg (1) – 08:58; Sergei Shirokov (2; ENG) – 19:40		Third period	16:37 – Paul Postma (2; PPG)
Igor Bobkov (30 shots / 27 saves)		Goalie stats	Alexander Sharychenkov (21 shots / 16 saves)

1 March	Ak Bars Kazan	1–4	Avangard Omsk	TatNeft Arena	Recap
Rob Klinkhammer (1) – 15:59		First period	19:19 – Denis Zernov (2; PPG)
No scoring		Second period	15:16 – Denis Zernov (3)
No scoring		Third period	01:40 – Kirill Semyonov (1; SHG); 06:55 – Semyon Koshelev (2)
Vladislav Podyapolsky (29 shots / 25 saves)		Goalie stats	Igor Bobkov (23 shots / 22 saves)

3 March	Ak Bars Kazan	2–3	Avangard Omsk	TatNeft Arena	Recap
Anton Lander (1; PPG) – 06:22		First period	05:42 – Sergei Shumakov (3)
No scoring		Second period	04:37 – Sergei Shumakov (4); 10:38 – Sergei Shumakov (5; PPG)
Mikhail Glukhov (1) – 02:19		Third period	No scoring
Vladislav Podyapolsky (25 shots / 22 saves)		Goalie stats	Igor Bobkov (23 shots / 21 saves)

Avangard Omsk win 4–0

=== Western Conference first round ===
==== (1) CSKA Moscow vs. (8) Vityaz Podolsk ====
CSKA Moscow finished first in the Western Conference earning 106 points. Vityaz Podolsk finished as the Western Conference's eighth seed, earning 63 points. This was the first playoff meeting between the two teams; CSKA Moscow won three of the four games in this year's regular season series.

26 February	CSKA Moscow	4–0	Vityaz Podolsk	VTB Ice Palace	Recap
No scoring		First period	No scoring
Mikhail Grigorenko (1) – 14:09; Maxim Shalunov (1) – 15:13		Second period	No scoring
Konstantin Okulov (1) – 04:15; Andrei Svetlakov (1; SHG) – 19:59		Third period	No scoring
Ilya Sorokin (10 shots / 10 saves)		Goalie stats	Joni Ortio (39 shots / 35 saves)

28 February	CSKA Moscow	6–2	Vityaz Podolsk	VTB Ice Palace	Recap
No scoring		First period	18:33 – Pavel Chernov (1)
Mikhail Grigorenko (2; PPG) – 04:51; Konstantin Okulov (2) – 09:38; Nikita Nesterov (1) – 12:26; Mikhail Naumenkov (1) – 16:04		Second period	No scoring
Mikhail Grigorenko (3; PPG) – 03:37; Alexey Marchenko (1; PPG) – 10:17		Third period	06:00 – Borna Rendulić (1)
Ilya Sorokin (14 shots / 12 saves)		Goalie stats	Joni Ortio (22 shots / 18 saves); Alexander Samonov (15 shots / 13 saves)

2 March	Vityaz Podolsk	1–3	CSKA Moscow	Vityaz Ice Palace	Recap
No scoring		First period	No scoring
Alexander Yevseyenkov (1; PPG) – 18:46		Second period	07:25 – Maxim Shalunov (2)
No scoring		Third period	04:46 – Mat Robinson (1); 10:38 – Anton Slepyshev (1; PPG)
Alexander Samonov (36 shots / 33 saves)		Goalie stats	Ilya Sorokin (28 shots / 27 saves)

4 March	Vityaz Podolsk	1–3	CSKA Moscow	Vityaz Ice Palace	Recap
No scoring		First period	03:44 – Mikhail Grigorenko (4); 09:37 – Kirill Kaprizov (1; PPG)
Artyom Shvets-Rogovoi (1; PPG) – 04:35		Second period	19:18 – Mikhail Grigorenko (5)
No scoring		Third period	No scoring
Alexander Samonov (3 shots / 1 save); Joni Ortio (30 shots / 29 saves)		Goalie stats	Ilya Sorokin (24 shots / 23 saves)

CSKA Moscow win 4–0

==== (2) SKA Saint Petersburg vs. (7) Spartak Moscow ====
SKA Saint Petersburg finished second in the Western Conference earning 103 points. Spartak Moscow finished as the Western Conference's seventh seed, earning 64 points. This was the third playoff meeting between the two teams, with the previous two series having been shared; SKA Saint Petersburg swept the most recent series during the 2011 Gagarin Cup playoffs. SKA Saint Petersburg won all four games in this year's regular season series.

26 February	SKA Saint Petersburg	0–2	Spartak Moscow	Ice Palace	Recap
No scoring		First period	17:26 – Robin Hanzl (1; PPG); 19:40 – Mārtiņš Karsums (1; PPG)
No scoring		Second period	No scoring
No scoring		Third period	No scoring
Igor Shestyorkin (16 shots / 14 saves)		Goalie stats	Július Hudáček (30 shots / 30 saves)

28 February	SKA Saint Petersburg	2–3	Spartak Moscow	Ice Palace	Recap
No scoring		First period	No scoring
Roman Rukavishnikov (1) – 06:05; Alexander Barabanov (1; PPG) – 10:52		Second period	No scoring
No scoring		Third period	05:53 – Dmitri Kalinin (1); 16:52 – Ilya Talaluyev (1; PPG); 19:55 – Mārtiņš Karsums (2)
Igor Shestyorkin (18 shots / 15 saves)		Goalie stats	Július Hudáček (34 shots / 32 saves)

2 March	Spartak Moscow	2–5	SKA Saint Petersburg	VTB Ice Palace	Recap
No scoring		First period	15:11 – Nikita Gusev (1; PPG)
Artyom Fyodorov (1) – 04:55		Second period	02:27 – Nikita Gusev (2; PPG); 03:12 – Vladislav Gavrikov (1; PPG); 14:28 – Alexander Barabanov (2; PPG)
Anton Zlobin (1) – 18:02		Third period	19:26 – Jarno Koskiranta (1; ENG)
Július Hudáček (38 shots / 34 saves)		Goalie stats	Igor Shestyorkin (16 shots / 15 saves); Magnus Hellberg (11 shots / 10 saves)

4 March	Spartak Moscow	2–3	OT	SKA Saint Petersburg	VTB Ice Palace	Recap
No scoring		First period		No scoring
No scoring		Second period		05:20 – Nail Yakupov (1)
Yevgeni Kulik (1; PPG) – 15:15; Enver Lisin (1) – 15:36		Third period		09:26 – Vasili Tokranov (1; PPG)
No scoring		First overtime period		04:17 – David Rundblad (1)
Július Hudáček (34 shots / 31 saves)		Goalie stats		Magnus Hellberg (19 shots / 17 saves)

6 March	SKA Saint Petersburg	2–1	Spartak Moscow	Ice Palace	Recap
No scoring		First period	No scoring
No scoring		Second period	04:04 – Anton Zlobin (2)
Maxim Karpov (1; PPG) – 08:32; David Rundblad (2; PPG) – 14:06		Third period	No scoring
Magnus Hellberg (20 shots / 19 saves)		Goalie stats	Július Hudáček (29 shots / 27 saves)

8 March	Spartak Moscow	1–2	SKA Saint Petersburg	VTB Ice Palace	Recap
No scoring		First period	No scoring
No scoring		Second period	15:41 – Nikita Gusev (3)
Ilya Zubov (1) – 18:44		Third period	17:35 – Sergei Plotnikov (1)
Július Hudáček (31 shots / 29 saves)		Goalie stats	Magnus Hellberg (15 shots / 14 saves)

SKA Saint Petersburg win 4–2

==== (3) Lokomotiv Yaroslavl vs. (6) HC Sochi ====
Lokomotiv Yaroslavl finished second in the Western Conference earning 86 points. HC Sochi finished as the Western Conference's sixth seed, earning 66 points. This was the first playoff meeting between the two teams, and they split their four-game regular season series.

25 February	Lokomotiv Yaroslavl	4–3	OT	HC Sochi	Arena 2000	Recap
Staffan Kronwall (1) – 15:09		First period		07:19 – Kirill Kapustin (1); 13:04 – Jyrki Jokipakka (1; PPG)
Egor Averin (1) – 06:50; Staffan Kronwall (2; PPG) – 11:45		Second period		No scoring
No scoring		Third period		00:51 – Kirill Kapustin (2; PPG)
Georgy Ivanov (1) – 03:17		First overtime period		No scoring
Ilya Konovalov (28 shots / 25 saves)		Goalie stats		Konstantin Barulin (25 shots / 21 saves)

27 February	Lokomotiv Yaroslavl	3–0	HC Sochi	Arena 2000	Recap
Georgy Ivanov (2) – 02:24		First period	No scoring
Rushan Rafikov (1) – 00:34; Daniil Apalkov (1; PPG) – 02:57		Second period	No scoring
No scoring		Third period	No scoring
Ilya Konovalov (22 shots / 22 saves)		Goalie stats	Konstantin Barulin (15 shots / 12 saves); Dmitry Shikin (13 shots / 13 saves)

1 March	HC Sochi	3–2	OT	Lokomotiv Yaroslavl	Bolshoy Ice Dome	Recap
No scoring		First period		16:48 – Stepan Sannikov (1)
Sean Collins (1; PPG) – 08:22		Second period		13:59 – Staffan Kronwall (3)
Andrei Altybarmakyan (1) – 13:40		Third period		No scoring
Andrei Altybarmakyan (2) – 01:35		First overtime period		No scoring
Dmitry Shikin (28 shots / 26 saves)		Goalie stats		Ilya Konovalov (20 shots / 17 saves)

3 March	HC Sochi	3–1	Lokomotiv Yaroslavl	Bolshoy Ice Dome	Recap
Stepan Starkov (1) – 14:24		First period	No scoring
Eric O'Dell (1) – 13:44		Second period	08:31 – Egor Averin (2)
Robert Rosén (1; ENG) – 19:38		Third period	No scoring
Dmitry Shikin (38 shots / 37 saves)		Goalie stats	Ilya Konovalov (18 shots / 16 saves)

5 March	Lokomotiv Yaroslavl	3–0	HC Sochi	Arena 2000	Recap
No scoring		First period	No scoring
Brandon Kozun (1) – 04:11; Artur Kayumov (1) – 09:01; Daniil Apalkov (2; PPG) – 16:25		Second period	No scoring
No scoring		Third period	No scoring
Alexander Salák (17 shots / 17 saves)		Goalie stats	Dmitry Shikin (29 shots / 26 saves); Konstantin Barulin (6 shots / 6 saves)

7 March	HC Sochi	2–5	Lokomotiv Yaroslavl	Bolshoy Ice Dome	Recap
Robert Rosén (2; PPG) – 10:43		First period	14:52 – Daniil Misyul (1)
Martin Bakoš (1) – 08:06		Second period	04:08 – Pavel Kraskovsky (1); 07:06 – Pavel Kraskovsky (2); 10:18 – Daniil Apalkov (3; PPG); 18:35 – Jakub Nakládal (1)
No scoring		Third period	No scoring
Dmitry Shikin (29 shots / 24 saves); Konstantin Barulin (6 shots / 6 saves)		Goalie stats	Alexander Salák (27 shots / 25 saves)

Lokomotiv Yaroslavl win 4–2

==== (4) Jokerit vs. (5) Dynamo Moscow ====
Jokerit finished fourth in the Western Conference earning 80 points. Ak Bars Kazan finished as the Western Conference's fifth seed, earning 72 points. This was the first playoff meeting between the two teams; Dynamo Moscow won all four games in this year's regular season series, extending a winning streak, stretching back to 17 September 2015, to eleven games over Jokerit. Dynamo Moscow extended the streak to thirteen, before Jokerit won Game 3.

25 February	Jokerit	2–4	Dynamo Moscow	Hartwall Arena	Recap
No scoring		First period	No scoring
John Norman (1) – 13:50		Second period	09:29 – Daniil Tarasov (1; PPG)
Kristian Vesalainen (1) – 11:04		Third period	05:52 – Ivan Muranov (1); 09:15 – Vadim Shipachyov (1); 19:38 – Evgeny Mozer (1)
Jānis Kalniņš (20 shots / 17 saves)		Goalie stats	Alexander Yeryomenko (34 shots / 32 saves)

27 February	Jokerit	2–3	Dynamo Moscow	Hartwall Arena	Recap
Nicklas Jensen (1) – 09:06		First period	15:23 – Patrik Zackrisson (1); 17:30 – Miks Indrašis (1)
No scoring		Second period	08:44 – Miika Koivisto (1; PPG)
Brian O'Neill (1) – 04:13		Third period	No scoring
Ryan Zapolski (14 shots / 11 saves); Jānis Kalniņš (6 shots / 6 saves)		Goalie stats	Alexander Yeryomenko (48 shots / 46 saves)

1 March	Dynamo Moscow	2–3	OT	Jokerit	VTB Arena	Recap
No scoring		First period		No scoring
Vladimir Bryukvin (1) – 09:19; Ivan Igumnov (1; SHG) – 15:45		Second period		12:11 – Pekka Jormakka (1)
No scoring		Third period		15:51 – Sakari Manninen (1)
No scoring		First overtime period		04:48 – Sakari Manninen (2)
Ivan Bocharov (35 shots / 32 saves)		Goalie stats		Jānis Kalniņš (27 shots / 25 saves)

3 March	Dynamo Moscow	3–0	Jokerit	VTB Arena	Recap
Vladimir Bryukvin (2) – 16:09		First period	No scoring
Patrik Zackrisson (2; SHG) – 15:55		Second period	No scoring
Andrei Mironov (1; ENG) – 18:31		Third period	No scoring
Alexander Yeryomenko (43 shots / 43 saves)		Goalie stats	Jānis Kalniņš (23 shots / 21 saves)

5 March	Jokerit	2–1	Dynamo Moscow	Hartwall Arena	Recap
Jesse Joensuu (1) – 03:36		First period	No scoring
No scoring		Second period	No scoring
John Norman (2) – 12:28		Third period	17:21 – Patrik Zackrisson (3; PPG)
Jānis Kalniņš (25 shots / 24 saves)		Goalie stats	Alexander Yeryomenko (29 shots / 27 saves)

7 March	Dynamo Moscow	6–2	Jokerit	VTB Arena	Recap
Michal Čajkovský (1) – 06:18; Vladimir Bryukvin (3; PPG) – 08:48; Vladislav Yefremov (1) – 10:12; Yegor Zaitsev (1) – 12:42; Daniil Tarasov (2; PPG) – 17:23		First period	No scoring
Dmitri Kagarlitsky (1; PPG) – 06:04		Second period	19:03 – Nicklas Jensen (2)
No scoring		Third period	03:49 – Marko Anttila (1)
Ivan Bocharov (45 shots / 43 saves)		Goalie stats	Jānis Kalniņš (13 shots / 9 saves); Ryan Zapolski (11 shots / 9 saves)

Dynamo Moscow win 4–2

== Conference Semi-Finals ==
=== Eastern Conference Semi-Finals ===
==== (1) Avtomobilist Yekaterinburg vs. (6) Salavat Yulaev Ufa ====
This was the second playoff meeting between these teams, with Salavat Yulaev winning the series played in 2010.

14 March	Avtomobilist Yekaterinburg	0–1	Salavat Yulaev Ufa	KRK Uralets	Recap
No scoring		First period	No scoring
No scoring		Second period	02:55 – Joonas Kemppainen (4; PPG)
No scoring		Third period	No scoring
Jakub Kovář (24 shots / 23 saves)		Goalie stats	Juha Metsola (34 shots / 34 saves)

16 March	Avtomobilist Yekaterinburg	2–0	Salavat Yulaev Ufa	KRK Uralets	Recap
Georgi Belousov (1; PPG) – 09:24		First period	No scoring
Stéphane Da Costa (1) – 06:44		Second period	No scoring
No scoring		Third period	No scoring
Jakub Kovář (25 shots / 25 saves)		Goalie stats	Juha Metsola (41 shots / 39 saves)

18 March	Salavat Yulaev Ufa	2–1	OT	Avtomobilist Yekaterinburg	Ufa Arena	Recap
No scoring		First period		No scoring
Vladimir Tkachev (2) – 09:48		Second period		No scoring
No scoring		Third period		04:43 – Alexander Kucheryavenko (2; SHG)
Joonas Kemppainen (5; PPG) – 11:08		First overtime period		No scoring
Juha Metsola (42 shots / 41 saves)		Goalie stats		Jakub Kovář (43 shots / 41 saves)

20 March	Salavat Yulaev Ufa	4–2	Avtomobilist Yekaterinburg	Ufa Arena	Recap
Alexei Semenov (1; PPG) – 05:04; Eduard Gimatov (1) – 06:05; Philip Larsen (1) – 16:21		First period	09:21 – Francis Paré (1)
Joonas Kemppainen (6) – 15:08		Second period	No scoring
No scoring		Third period	18:04 – Denis Bodrov (1)
Juha Metsola (39 shots / 37 saves)		Goalie stats	Jakub Kovář (13 shots / 9 saves); Leonid Fomin (1 shot / 1 save)

22 March	Avtomobilist Yekaterinburg	1–4	Salavat Yulaev Ufa	KRK Uralets	Recap
No scoring		First period	01:02 – Teemu Hartikainen (6); 04:14 – Vladimir Tkachev (3; PPG)
No scoring		Second period	10:29 – Linus Omark (3)
Evgeny Chesalin (1) – 11:36		Third period	02:09 – Joonas Kemppainen (7)
Jakub Kovář (19 shots / 15 saves)		Goalie stats	Juha Metsola (36 shots / 35 saves)

Salavat Yulaev Ufa win 4–1

==== (2) Barys Astana vs. (4) Avangard Omsk ====
This was the second playoff meeting between these teams, with Avangard winning the series played in 2015.

14 March	Barys Astana	1–3	Avangard Omsk	Barys Arena	Recap
No scoring		First period	12:15 – Kirill Petrov (1); 17:51 – Ilya Mikheyev (2; PPG)
No scoring		Second period	No scoring
André Petersson (3) – 04:25		Third period	18:56 – Sergei Shirokov (3; ENG)
Henrik Karlsson (38 shots / 36 saves)		Goalie stats	Igor Bobkov (16 shots / 15 saves)

16 March	Barys Astana	4–2	Avangard Omsk	Barys Arena	Recap
No scoring		First period	No scoring
Jesse Blacker (1; PPG) – 09:41; Dustin Boyd (1) – 14:01		Second period	No scoring
Brandon Bochenski (4; PPG) – 06:17; Dustin Boyd (2; PPG) – 14:04		Third period	04:06 – Sergei Shumakov (6; PPG); 18:52 – Cody Franson (2; PPG)
Henrik Karlsson (38 shots / 36 saves)		Goalie stats	Igor Bobkov (35 shots / 31 saves)

18 March	Avangard Omsk	5–0	Barys Astana	Balashikha Arena	Recap
Andrei Stas (1; PPG) – 13:12		First period	No scoring
Sergei Shumakov (7; PPG) – 02:57; Sergei Shirokov (4; PPG) – 15:07		Second period	No scoring
Kirill Semyonov (2) – 03:40; Cody Franson (3; PPG) – 12:19		Third period	No scoring
Igor Bobkov (20 shots / 20 saves)		Goalie stats	Henrik Karlsson (22 shots / 18 saves); Dominik Hrachovina (9 shots / 8 saves)

20 March	Avangard Omsk	3–1	Barys Astana	Balashikha Arena	Recap
No scoring		First period	No scoring
Alexander Yaremchuk (1) – 07:36		Second period	08:40 – Matt Frattin (7; PPG)
Maxim Chudinov (1) – 07:22; Maxim Chudinov (2; PPG) – 14:25		Third period	No scoring
Igor Bobkov (20 shots / 19 saves)		Goalie stats	Henrik Karlsson (26 shots / 23 saves)

22 March	Barys Astana	3–5	Avangard Omsk	Barys Arena	Recap
Matt Frattin (8) – 10:28		First period	No scoring
Matt Frattin (9) – 00:27		Second period	03:24 – Nikita Pivtsakin (1); 03:55 – Kirill Petrov (2); 15:04 – Taylor Beck (2; PPG); 16:25 – Sergei Shirokov (5; PPG)
Nikita Mikhailis (1) – 19:50		Third period	04:02 – Maxim Chudinov (3)
Dominik Hrachovina (18 shots / 14 saves); Henrik Karlsson (9 shots / 8 saves)		Goalie stats	Igor Bobkov (31 shots / 28 saves)

Avangard Omsk win 4–1

=== Western Conference Semi-Finals ===
==== (1) CSKA Moscow vs. (5) Dynamo Moscow ====
This was the third playoff meeting between these teams, with Dynamo having won both previous series.

13 March	CSKA Moscow	4–1	Dynamo Moscow	VTB Ice Palace	Recap
Kirill Kaprizov (2) – 03:11; Mikhail Grigorenko (6) – 18:24		First period	No scoring
Linden Vey (1; PPG) – 09:58		Second period	01:15 – Michal Čajkovský (2)
Nikita Nesterov (2) – 01:42		Third period	No scoring
Ilya Sorokin (15 shots / 14 saves)		Goalie stats	Alexander Yeryomenko (29 shots / 25 saves); Ivan Bocharov (3 shots / 3 saves)

15 March	CSKA Moscow	0–1	OT	Dynamo Moscow	VTB Ice Palace	Recap
No scoring		First period		No scoring
No scoring		Second period		No scoring
No scoring		Third period		No scoring
No scoring		First overtime period		00:35 – Vladimir Bryukvin (4)
Ilya Sorokin (21 shots / 20 saves)		Goalie stats		Ivan Bocharov (22 shots / 22 saves)

17 March	Dynamo Moscow	0–4	CSKA Moscow	VTB Arena	Recap
No scoring		First period	04:31 – Anton Slepyshev (2; PPG)
No scoring		Second period	13:03 – Konstantin Okulov (3; PPG); 16:52 – Konstantin Okulov (4)
No scoring		Third period	19:59 – Maxim Shalunov (3; PPG)
Ivan Bocharov (38 shots / 34 saves)		Goalie stats	Ilya Sorokin (23 shots / 23 saves)

19 March	Dynamo Moscow	1–2	CSKA Moscow	VTB Arena	Recap
Juuso Hietanen (1) – 17:06		First period	No scoring
No scoring		Second period	No scoring
No scoring		Third period	04:04 – Konstantin Okulov (5); 19:35 – Mat Robinson (2)
Alexander Yeryomenko (24 shots / 22 saves)		Goalie stats	Ilya Sorokin (27 shots / 26 saves)

21 March	CSKA Moscow	3–2	Dynamo Moscow	VTB Ice Palace	Recap
Pavel Karnaukhov (1) – 13:13		First period	19:10 – Yegor Zaitsev (2)
Jannik Hansen (1; PPG) – 10:01		Second period	18:56 – Dmitri Kagarlitsky (2; PPG)
Linden Vey (2) – 06:47		Third period	No scoring
Ilya Sorokin (19 shots / 17 saves)		Goalie stats	Alexander Yeryomenko (34 shots / 31 saves)

CSKA Moscow win 4–1

==== (2) SKA Saint Petersburg vs. (3) Lokomotiv Yaroslavl ====
This was the fifth playoff meeting between these teams, with SKA winning the three past seasons and Lokomotiv winning in 2014.

13 March	SKA Saint Petersburg	1–0	Lokomotiv Yaroslavl	Ice Palace	Recap
No scoring		First period	No scoring
No scoring		Second period	No scoring
David Rundblad (3; PPG) – 06:16		Third period	No scoring
Magnus Hellberg (23 shots / 23 saves)		Goalie stats	Alexander Salák (27 shots / 26 saves)

15 March	SKA Saint Petersburg	6–1	Lokomotiv Yaroslavl	Ice Palace	Recap
Mikhail Maltsev (1) – 13:44		First period	15:59 – Artur Kayumov (2; PPG)
Nikita Gusev (4) – 06:54; Alexei Byvaltsev (1; PPG) – 11:50; Jarno Koskiranta (2; PPG) – 12:29		Second period	No scoring
Pavel Datsyuk (1; PPG) – 02:35; Viktor Tikhonov (1) – 14:31		Third period	No scoring
Magnus Hellberg (22 shots / 21 saves)		Goalie stats	Alexander Salák (16 shots / 12 saves); Ilya Konovalov (15 shots / 13 saves)

17 March	Lokomotiv Yaroslavl	3–1	SKA Saint Petersburg	Arena 2000	Recap
Maxim Osipov (1) – 07:07		First period	No scoring
Georgy Ivanov (3) – 16:31		Second period	No scoring
Maxim Osipov (2) – 16:04		Third period	00:55 – Nail Yakupov (2)
Ilya Konovalov (31 shots / 30 saves)		Goalie stats	Magnus Hellberg (29 shots / 26 saves)

19 March	Lokomotiv Yaroslavl	1–3	SKA Saint Petersburg	Arena 2000	Recap
No scoring		First period	11:30 – Roman Rukavishnikov (2)
No scoring		Second period	No scoring
Mikhail Belyayev (1) – 19:34		Third period	12:29 – David Rundblad (4; PPG); 14:37 – Maxim Karpov (2)
Ilya Konovalov (31 shots / 30 saves); Alexander Salák (0 shots / 0 saves)		Goalie stats	Magnus Hellberg (22 shots / 21 saves)

21 March	SKA Saint Petersburg	5–4	OT	Lokomotiv Yaroslavl	Ice Palace	Recap
No scoring		First period		04:15 – Denis Alexeyev (1)
Nikita Gusev (5) – 00:38; Nikita Gusev (6; PPG) – 04:12; Artyom Zub (1) – 10:07; Alexei Byvaltsev (2; PPG) – 17:52		Second period		10:59 – Stepan Sannikov (2)
No scoring		Third period		05:18 – Daniil Apalkov (4); 12:49 – Rushan Rafikov (2)
Dinar Khafizullin (1; PPG) – 06:45		First overtime period		No scoring
Magnus Hellberg (25 shots / 21 saves); Igor Shestyorkin (0 shots / 0 saves)		Goalie stats		Ilya Konovalov (19 shots / 16 saves); Alexander Salák (15 shots / 13 saves)

SKA Saint Petersburg win 4–1

== Conference finals ==
=== Eastern Conference finals ===
==== (4) Avangard Omsk vs. (6) Salavat Yulaev Ufa ====
This was the fourth playoff meeting between these teams, with Avangard Omsk winning the series played in 2009 and Salavat Yulaev Ufa winning in 2016 and 2018. This represents the lowest-seeded Conference Final match-up in KHL history, with the winners becoming the lowest seed to play in a Gagarin Cup final series.

In Game 3, Joonas Kemppainen's eventual game-winning goal – his ninth goal of the playoffs – set the record for most playoff goals by a Salavat Yulaev Ufa player in one season, breaking the record set by Alexander Radulov in 2010. In Game 6, the longest game in Conference Finals history, Salavat Yulaev Ufa goaltender Juha Metsola made 69 saves, a record in the KHL.

29 March	Avangard Omsk	4–3	OT	Salavat Yulaev Ufa	Balashikha Arena	Recap
Taylor Beck (3; PPG) – 10:38		First period		No scoring
Ville Pokka (2) – 01:59		Second period		00:51 – Zakhar Arzamastsev (1); 12:09 – Pyotr Khokhryakov (1)
Viktor Stålberg (2) – 12:01		Third period		06:13 – Joonas Kemppainen (8)
Sergei Shumakov (8; PPG) – 04:03		First overtime period		No scoring
Igor Bobkov (27 shots / 24 saves)		Goalie stats		Juha Metsola (44 shots / 40 saves)

31 March	Avangard Omsk	4–1	Salavat Yulaev Ufa	Balashikha Arena	Recap
No scoring		First period	No scoring
Sergei Shirokov (6; PPG) – 13:11		Second period	No scoring
Taylor Beck (4) – 06:32; Kirill Semyonov (3) – 15:33; Alexei Emelin (1; ENG) – 19:36		Third period	03:32 – Vladimir Tkachev (4; PPG)
Igor Bobkov (17 shots / 16 saves)		Goalie stats	Juha Metsola (40 shots / 37 saves)

2 April	Salavat Yulaev Ufa	5–1	Avangard Omsk	Ufa Arena	Recap
Artyom Sergeyev (1) – 10:53; Joonas Kemppainen (9) – 14:12; Teemu Hartikainen (7) – 19:25		First period	No scoring
No scoring		Second period	17:08 – Denis Zernov (4; PPG)
Maxim Mayorov (2; ENG) – 18:50; Pyotr Khokhryakov (2) – 19:42		Third period	No scoring
Juha Metsola (30 shots / 29 saves)		Goalie stats	Igor Bobkov (7 shots / 4 saves); Ivan Nalimov (21 shots / 20 saves)

4 April	Salavat Yulaev Ufa	2–4	Avangard Omsk	Ufa Arena	Recap
No scoring		First period	No scoring
Teemu Hartikainen (8) – 07:56; Pyotr Khokhryakov (3; SHG) – 10:09		Second period	01:25 – Sergei Shumakov (9); 03:53 – Ilya Mikheyev (3; PPG); 17:06 – Ilya Mikheyev (4)
No scoring		Third period	18:49 – Denis Zernov (5)
Juha Metsola (36 shots / 32 saves)		Goalie stats	Igor Bobkov (25 shots / 23 saves)

6 April	Avangard Omsk	2–3	2OT	Salavat Yulaev Ufa	Balashikha Arena	Recap
Sergei Shumakov (10) – 11:59		First period		02:03 – Alexander Burmistrov (1)
Maxime Talbot (1; PPG) – 16:36		Second period		No scoring
No scoring		Third period		08:51 – Linus Omark (4; PPG)
No scoring		Second overtime period		08:58 – Joonas Kemppainen (10)
Igor Bobkov (41 shots / 38 saves)		Goalie stats		Juha Metsola (60 shots / 58 saves)

8 April	Salavat Yulaev Ufa	0–1	3OT	Avangard Omsk	Ufa Arena	Recap
No scoring		First period		No scoring
No scoring		Second period		No scoring
No scoring		Third period		No scoring
No scoring		Third overtime period		09:18 – Alexei Bondarev (1)
Juha Metsola (70 shots / 69 saves)		Goalie stats		Igor Bobkov (36 shots / 36 saves)

Avangard Omsk win 4–2

=== Western Conference finals ===
==== (1) CSKA Moscow vs. (2) SKA Saint Petersburg ====
This was the sixth playoff meeting between these teams, with SKA winning the first three playoff series and CSKA winning the two most recent series.

28 March	CSKA Moscow	2–1	SKA Saint Petersburg	VTB Ice Palace	Recap
Alexander Popov (1) – 17:21		First period	14:12 – Dinar Khafizullin (2)
Mikhail Grigorenko (7) – 07:55		Second period	No scoring
No scoring		Third period	No scoring
Ilya Sorokin (37 shots / 36 saves)		Goalie stats	Magnus Hellberg (12 shots / 10 saves)

30 March	CSKA Moscow	3–1	SKA Saint Petersburg	VTB Ice Palace	Recap
Kirill Kaprizov (3; PPG) – 12:58		First period	No scoring
Greg Scott (1) – 16:24		Second period	18:51 – Nikita Gusev (7; PPG)
Ivan Telegin (1) – 09:54		Third period	No scoring
Ilya Sorokin (26 shots / 25 saves)		Goalie stats	Igor Shestyorkin (19 shots / 16 saves)

1 April	SKA Saint Petersburg	2–1	OT	CSKA Moscow	Ice Palace	Recap
No scoring		First period		19:59 – Pavel Karnaukhov (2)
Alexander Barabanov (3) – 07:58		Second period		No scoring
No scoring		Third period		No scoring
Nikolai Prokhorkin (1) – 12:43		First overtime period		No scoring
Igor Shestyorkin (17 shots / 16 saves)		Goalie stats		Ilya Sorokin (29 shots / 27 saves)

3 April	SKA Saint Petersburg	3–1	CSKA Moscow	Ice Palace	Recap
No scoring		First period	13:38 – Mikhail Naumenkov (2)
Nikolai Prokhorkin (2) – 08:18		Second period	No scoring
Nikita Gusev (8; PPG) – 03:31; Sergei Plotnikov (2) – 04:21		Third period	No scoring
Igor Shestyorkin (20 shots / 19 saves)		Goalie stats	Ilya Sorokin (22 shots / 19 saves); Lars Johansson (1 shot / 1 save)

5 April	CSKA Moscow	3–0	SKA Saint Petersburg	VTB Ice Palace	Recap
Mat Robinson (3) – 19:16		First period	No scoring
Maxim Mamin (1) – 07:29		Second period	No scoring
Sergei Andronov (1; ENG) – 19:00		Third period	No scoring
Ilya Sorokin (19 shots / 19 saves)		Goalie stats	Igor Shestyorkin (20 shots / 18 saves)

7 April	SKA Saint Petersburg	3–2	CSKA Moscow	Ice Palace	Recap
Nail Yakupov (3) – 15:35		First period	No scoring
Nail Yakupov (4) – 02:02		Second period	13:16 – Mat Robinson (4); 15:37 – Mat Robinson (5; PPG)
Nikita Gusev (9; PPG) – 05:52		Third period	No scoring
Igor Shestyorkin (29 shots / 27 saves)		Goalie stats	Ilya Sorokin (17 shots / 14 saves)

9 April	CSKA Moscow	3–1	SKA Saint Petersburg	VTB Ice Palace	Recap
No scoring		First period	No scoring
Linden Vey (3; PPG) – 05:17; Anton Slepyshev (3) – 07:54		Second period	10:18 – Sergei Plotnikov (3)
Mikhail Grigorenko (8; ENG) – 19:58		Third period	No scoring
Ilya Sorokin (18 shots / 17 saves)		Goalie stats	Igor Shestyorkin (23 shots / 21 saves)

CSKA Moscow win 4–3

== Gagarin Cup Finals ==
This is the first playoff meeting between these teams, and CSKA's third and Avangard's second appearance in the Gagarin Cup Finals.

=== (W1) CSKA Moscow vs. (E4) Avangard Omsk ===
In the opening game of the series, CSKA Moscow's Mikhail Grigorenko scored the first hat-trick in the Gagarin Cup Finals, including the game-winning goal.

13 April	CSKA Moscow	5–2	Avangard Omsk	VTB Ice Palace	Recap
Andrei Svetlakov (2) – 02:00; Alexey Marchenko (2) – 08:05		First period	No scoring
Mikhail Grigorenko (9) – 10:56		Second period	13:27 – Sergei Shumakov (11; PPG)
Mikhail Grigorenko (10) – 07:19; Mikhail Grigorenko (11; ENG) – 19:29		Third period	14:56 – Viktor Stålberg (3; PPG)
Ilya Sorokin (26 shots / 24 saves)		Goalie stats	Igor Bobkov (25 shots / 21 saves); Ivan Nalimov (2 shots / 2 saves)

15 April	CSKA Moscow	3–0	Avangard Omsk	VTB Ice Palace	Recap
No scoring		First period	No scoring
No scoring		Second period	No scoring
Konstantin Okulov (6) – 13:10; Mikhail Grigorenko (12; ENG) – 18:22; Sergei Andronov (2; ENG) – 19:09		Third period	No scoring
Ilya Sorokin (27 shots / 27 saves)		Goalie stats	Igor Bobkov (21 shots / 20 saves)

17 April	Avangard Omsk	0–2	CSKA Moscow	Balashikha Arena	Recap
No scoring		First period	No scoring
No scoring		Second period	No scoring
No scoring		Third period	03:02 – Sergei Andronov (3); 19:04 – Mikhail Grigorenko (13; ENG)
Igor Bobkov (29 shots / 28 saves)		Goalie stats	Ilya Sorokin (16 shots / 16 saves)

19 April	Avangard Omsk	2–3	OT	CSKA Moscow	Balashikha Arena	Recap
Sergei Shumakov (12; PPG) – 12:51; Cody Franson (4) –17:11		First period		No scoring
No scoring		Second period		03:47 – Kirill Kaprizov (4)
No scoring		Third period		17:12 – Konstantin Okulov (7)
No scoring		First overtime period		17:44 – Maxim Mamin (2)
Igor Bobkov (38 shots / 35 saves)		Goalie stats		Ilya Sorokin (38 shots / 36 saves)

CSKA Moscow win 4–0

== Player statistics ==
=== Scoring leaders ===
The following players led the league in points, at the conclusion of the playoffs. If two or more skaters are tied (i.e. same number of points, goals and played games), all of the tied skaters are shown.

Player	Team	GP	G	A	Pts	+/–	PIM
(Russia) Mikhail Grigorenko	CSKA Moscow	20	13	8	21	+9	10
(Finland) Teemu Hartikainen	Salavat Yulaev Ufa	17	8	13	21	+14	6
(Canada) Taylor Beck	Avangard Omsk	16	4	16	20	–3	6
(Russia) Nikita Gusev	SKA Saint Petersburg	18	9	10	19	–1	0
(Sweden) Linus Omark	Salavat Yulaev Ufa	17	4	14	18	+11	16
(Canada) Cody Franson	Avangard Omsk	19	4	14	18	–4	4
(Russia) Sergei Shumakov	Avangard Omsk	19	12	5	17	0	10
(Finland) Joonas Kemppainen	Salavat Yulaev Ufa	17	10	4	14	+11	12
(Russia) Konstantin Okulov	CSKA Moscow	19	7	7	14	+8	2
(Russia) Kirill Kaprizov	CSKA Moscow	19	4	10	14	+5	6

=== Leading goaltenders ===
The following goaltenders led the league in goals against average, at the conclusion of the playoffs.

Player	Team	GP	TOI	W	L	GA	SO	SV%	GAA
(Russia) Ilya Sorokin	CSKA Moscow	20	1213:12	16	4	24	5	94.74%	1.19
(Finland) Juha Metsola	Salavat Yulaev Ufa	17	1169:11	10	7	30	1	95.61%	1.54
(Sweden) Magnus Hellberg	SKA Saint Petersburg	10	570:50	7	2	16	1	91.92%	1.68
(Russia) Artyom Zagidulin	Metallurg Magnitogorsk	4	211:49	1	1	6	0	92.77%	1.70
(Russia) Igor Bobkov	Avangard Omsk	19	1181:16	12	7	36	3	92.58%	1.83
