= 2017 Kontinental Hockey League All-Star Game =

2017 KHL All-Star Game
- January 22, 2017
- Game one: Kharlamov Division 3, Chernyshev Division 4
- Game two: Bobrov Division 2, Tarasov Division 6
- Game three: Chernyshev Division 3, Tarasov Division 2

The 2017 Kontinental Hockey League All-Star Game took place on January 22, 2017 at Ufa Arena in Ufa, Russia, home of Salavat Yulaev Ufa, during the 2016–17 KHL season.

The 2017 All-Star Game saw a change in format from previous years, as instead of being a single game between West and East, it became a tournament between the four divisions of the KHL: the Bobrov, Tarasov, Kharlamov, and Chernyshev.

== Rosters ==
Bobrov Division
Nat.	Player	Team	Pos.
(Russia)	Igor Shestyorkin	SKA St. Petersburg	G
(Russia)	Ilya Kovalchuk	SKA St. Petersburg	F
(Canada)	Matt Ellison	Dinamo Minsk	F
(Russia)	Pavel Datsyuk	SKA St. Petersburg	F
(United States)	Ryan Stoa	Spartak Moskva	F
(Canada)	Jonathan Cheechoo	Slovan Bratislava	F
(Canada)	Francis Paré	Medveščak Zagreb	F
(Canada)	Chay Genoway	Jokerit Helsinki	D
(Russia)	Slava Voynov	SKA St. Petersburg	D
(United States)	Matt Gilroy	Spartak Moskva	D

Tarasov Division
Nat.	Player	Team	Pos.
(Russia)	Ilya Sorokin	CSKA Moskva	G
(Russia)	Valeri Nichushkin	CSKA Moskva	F
(Canada)	Brandon Kozun	Lokomotiv Yaroslavl	F
(Russia)	Ivan Telegin	CSKA Moskva	F
(Russia)	Maxim Afinogenov	Vityaz Podolsk	F
(Russia)	Dmitri Kagarlitsky	Severstal Cherepovets	F
(Russia)	Vladimir Galuzin	Torpedo Nizhny Novgorod	F
(Canada)	Mat Robinson	Dynamo Moskva	D
(Russia)	Igor Ozhiganov	CSKA Moskva	D
(Sweden)	Oscar Fantenberg	Sochi	D

Kharlamov Division
Nat.	Player	Team	Pos.
(Czech Republic)	Pavel Francouz	Traktor Chelyabinsk	G
(Russia)	Anatoly Golyshev	Avtomobilist Yekaterinburg	F
(Russia)	Sergei Mozyakin	Metallurg Magnitogorsk	F
(Russia)	Vladimir Tkachyov	Ak Bars Kazan	F
(Russia)	Nikita Filatov	Lada Tolyatti	F
(Russia)	Danis Zaripov	Metallurg Magnitogorsk	F
(Czech Republic)	Jan Kovář	Metallurg Magnitogorsk	F
(United States)	Dan Sexton	Neftekhimik Nizhnekamsk	F
(Russia)	Kirill Koltsov	Traktor Chelyabinsk	D
(Canada)	Chris Lee	Metallurg Magnitogorsk	D

Chernyshev Division
Nat.	Player	Team	Pos.
(Russia)	Igor Bobkov	Admiral Vladivostok	G
(Sweden)	Linus Omark	Salavat Yulaev Ufa	F
(Russia)	Brandon Kozun	Sibir Novosibirsk	F
(Czech Republic)	Vladimír Sobotka	Avangard Omsk	F
(Russia)	Kirill Kaprizov	Salavat Yulaev Ufa	F
(United States)	Chad Rau	Kunlun Red Star	F
(Kazakhstan)	Nigel Dawes	Barys Astana	F
(Russia)	Evgeny Medvedev	Avangard Omsk	D
(Russia)	Zakhar Arzamastsev	Salavat Yulaev Ufa	D
(Czech Republic)	Jan Kolář	Amur Khabarovsk	D
