= Galuzin =

Galuzin (Russian: Галузин) is a Russian masculine surname originating from the obsolete word galuza meaning naughty boy, its feminine counterpart is Galuzina. The surname may refer to the following notable people:

- Mikhail Galuzin (born 1960), Russian diplomat
- Vladimir Galuzin (born 1988), Russian ice hockey forward
- Vladimir Galouzine (born 1956), Russian tenor
