= Ilya Konovalov =

Ilya Konovalov may refer to:

- Ilya Konovalov (hammer thrower)
- Ilya Konovalov (ice hockey)
