= Ivan Bocharov =

Ivan Bocharov may refer to:

- Ivan Bocharov (chess player) (1990–), Russian chess player
- Ivan Bocharov (ice hockey player) (1996–), Russian hockey player
