= Igor Ozhiganov =

Russian ice hockey player (born 1992)

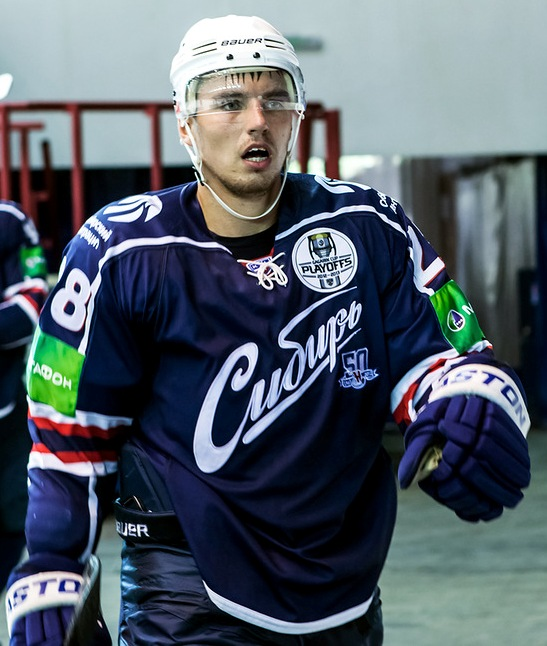
- Ozhiganov with Sibir Novosibirsk in 2013
- Born: October 13, 1992 (age 33) Krasnogorsk, Russia
- Height: 6 ft 2 in (188 cm)
- Weight: 207 lb (94 kg; 14 st 11 lb)
- Position: Defence
- Shoots: Right
- KHL team Former teams: Dynamo Moscow; CSKA Moscow; Amur Khabarovsk; Sibir Novosibirsk; Toronto Maple Leafs; Ak Bars Kazan; SKA Saint Petersburg
- National team: Russia
- NHL draft: Undrafted
- Playing career: 2011–present

Igor Olegovich Ozhiganov (Russian: Игорь Олегович Ожиганов; born 13 October 1992) is a Russian professional ice hockey defenceman currently playing for HC Dynamo Moscow in the Kontinental Hockey League (KHL). He has formerly played in the National Hockey League (NHL) with the Toronto Maple Leafs.

== Playing career ==
Ozhiganov played junior hockey within the CSKA Moscow organization. During the 2010–11 season, he made his professional debut by featuring in two games with CSKA in the Kontinental Hockey League (KHL).

Having established himself in the KHL with CSKA, Amur Khabarovsk and Sibir Novosibirsk, Ozhiganov despite being undrafted, initially met with Mike Babcock and Lou Lamoriello of the Toronto Maple Leafs in August 2017. While long rumoured to sign with the Maple Leafs, Ozhiganov played out the 2017–18 season in the KHL with CSKA, scoring 9 points in 42 games.

On 17 May 2018, Ozhiganov signed a one-year, entry-level contract with the Maple Leafs. After attending the Maple Leafs training camp, Ozhiganov remained on the opening night roster for the 2018–19 season. On 26 November, he scored his first NHL goal, against the Boston Bruins in a 4–2 home win. Ozhiganov established himself as a regular on the blueline in the first half of the season before falling out of favour with head coach Mike Babcock, sitting as a healthy scratch for 12 of the final 19 contests, including all seven playoff games against the Boston Bruins. He finished the season with 7 points in 53 games.

On 1 May 2019, Ozhiganov's KHL rights were traded by CSKA to Ak Bars Kazan in exchange for Jiri Sekac. As an impending free agent, Ozhiganov's departure from the Maple Leafs was confirmed on 17 May 2019, after he signed a two-year contract to return to the KHL with Ak Bars. His move to Ak Bars reunited Ozhiganov with head coach Dmitri Kvartalnov, formerly of CSKA.

In the 2019–20 season, Ozhiganov made 19 appearances with Ak Bars, posting 8 points before he was traded to SKA Saint Petersburg in exchange for Roman Rukavishnikov and Viktor Tikhonov on 7 November 2019.

After four seasons with SKA, Ozhiganov was traded one year into his initial four-year contract extension with Saint Petersburg to HC Dynamo Moscow in exchange for financial compensation on 17 July 2023.

== Personal life ==
Ozhiganov is married to rhythmic gymnast Alexandra Merkulova, and they have one son together.

== Career statistics ==
=== Regular season and playoffs ===
			Regular season					Playoffs
Season	Team	League	GP	G	A	Pts	PIM	GP	G	A	Pts	PIM
2009–10	Krasnaya Armiya	MHL	63	3	8	11	167	5	0	1	1	4
2010–11	Krasnaya Armiya	MHL	48	4	14	18	129	16	0	4	4	22
2010–11	CSKA Moscow	KHL	2	0	0	0	0	—	—	—	—	—
2011–12	Krasnaya Armiya	MHL	35	9	18	27	48	—	—	—	—	—
2011–12	CSKA Moscow	KHL	7	2	0	2	2	—	—	—	—	—
2012–13	Amur Khabarovsk	KHL	49	3	12	15	32	—	—	—	—	—
2012–13	CSKA Moscow	KHL	4	0	1	1	2	6	1	0	1	0
2013–14	Sibir Novosibirsk	KHL	52	1	5	6	34	10	1	2	3	6
2014–15	Sibir Novosibirsk	KHL	59	8	13	21	62	16	2	3	5	10
2015–16	CSKA Moscow	KHL	50	5	11	16	36	11	3	2	5	2
2016–17	CSKA Moscow	KHL	50	8	14	22	61	9	0	1	1	0
2017–18	CSKA Moscow	KHL	42	2	7	9	12	5	0	0	0	2
2018–19	Toronto Maple Leafs	NHL	53	3	4	7	14	—	—	—	—	—
2019–20	Ak Bars Kazan	KHL	19	1	7	8	12	—	—	—	—	—
2019–20	SKA Saint Petersburg	KHL	35	2	10	12	16	4	0	2	2	2
2020–21	SKA Saint Petersburg	KHL	54	7	22	29	18	16	3	4	7	4
2021–22	SKA Saint Petersburg	KHL	25	3	7	10	8	13	3	3	6	8
2022–23	SKA Saint Petersburg	KHL	62	11	26	37	24	15	2	5	7	10
2023–24	Dynamo Moscow	KHL	66	6	19	25	28	10	0	2	2	2
2024–25	Dynamo Moscow	KHL	67	6	17	23	20	17	2	8	10	2
2025–26	Dynamo Moscow	KHL	63	7	23	30	32	4	0	0	0	4
KHL totals			706	72	194	266	399	136	17	32	49	52
NHL totals			53	3	4	7	14	—	—	—	—	—

Medal record

Representing Russia

Ice hockey

World Junior Championships
Silver medal – second place	2012 Canada	

=== International ===
Year	Team	Event	Result	GP	G	A	Pts	PIM
2012	Russia	WJC	2nd place, silver medalist(s)	7	1	0	1	4
2021	ROC	WC	5th	8	0	2	2	0
Junior totals				7	1	0	1	4
Senior totals				8	0	2	2	0

== Awards and honours ==
Award	Year
KHL
All-Star Game	2017
