= Sergei Shumakov =

Russian ice hockey player

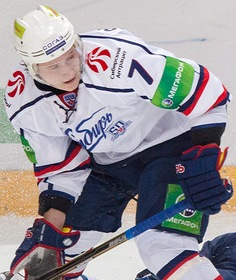
- Born: 4 September 1992 (age 33) Chelyabinsk, Russia
- Height: 6 ft 0 in (183 cm)
- Weight: 196 lb (89 kg; 14 st 0 lb)
- Position: Right wing
- Shot: Right
- Played for: Sibir Novosibirsk; CSKA Moscow; Hershey Bears; Springfield Thunderbirds; Avangard Omsk; Avtomobilist Yekaterinburg; Traktor Chelyabinsk; Dinamo Minsk; Lada Togliatti
- NHL draft: Undrafted
- Playing career: 2012–2025

Sergei Shumakov (born 4 September 1992) is a Russian former professional ice hockey forward who most recently played for HC Lada Togliatti in the Kontinental Hockey League (KHL).

== Playing career ==
Undrafted, Shumakov made his Kontinental Hockey League (KHL) debut with HC Sibir Novosibirsk during the 2011–12 season.

After the 2016–17 season, his seventh year in the KHL with Novosibirsk, Shumakov was traded along with Maxim Shalunov and Konstantin Okulov to HC CSKA Moscow in exchange for Alexander Sharov and financial compensation on the opening day of free agency on 1 May 2017. In his first season with CSKA in 2017–18, Shumakov responded to his change of scenery in recording a personal high 23 assists and 40 points in 47 regular season games.

On 27 August 2018, CSKA Moscow terminated their contract with Shumakov prior to the 2018–19 season. The following week, with ambition to embark on a career in the NHL, he signed a one-year, two-way contract with the Washington Capitals on 1 September 2018. On 7 December, with Shumakov unable to earn a recall to the NHL and having registered four points in 10 games with AHL affiliate, the Hershey Bears, the Capitals mutually terminated the contract with Shumakov. He was quickly signed as a free agent to a professional try-out to continue in the AHL, agreeing with the Springfield Thunderbirds, affiliate to the Florida Panthers on 8 December. He appeared in three games, scoring one goal with the Thunderbirds before ending his tryout on 13 December. Shumakov ended his North American stint and opted for an immediate return to the KHL, agreeing to a three-year contract with Avangard Omsk, on 19 December.

During the 2020–21 season, in the midst of his third season with Avangard, Shumakov registered 8 goals and 13 points through 28 games before he was traded by Omsk to Avtomobilist Yekaterinburg in exchange for financial compensation on 9 December 2020.

Following a season split between Traktor Chelyabinsk and HC Dinamo Minsk, Shumakov left as a free agent and was signed to a one-year contract for the return of Lada Togliatti to the KHL for the 2023–24 season on 21 June 2023.

After going unsigned for the duration of the 2024-25 season, Shumakov returned to Lada Togliatti on 8 October 2025. He left the team by mutual agreement on 17 November 2025 after three scoreless games.

On 14 July 2026, Shumakov announced his retirement from professional hockey.

== Career statistics ==
			Regular season					Playoffs
Season	Team	League	GP	G	A	Pts	PIM	GP	G	A	Pts	PIM
2009–10	Belye Medvedi Chelyabinsk	MHL	50	4	4	8	26	8	0	0	0	2
2010–11	Belye Tigry Orenburg	MHL	51	17	18	35	70	7	0	3	3	8
2011–12	Sibirskie Snaipery Novosibirsk	MHL	50	18	28	46	84	—	—	—	—	—
2011–12	Sibir Novosibirsk	KHL	1	0	0	0	0	—	—	—	—	—
2012–13	Sibirskie Snaipery Novosibirsk	MHL	16	14	14	28	24	—	—	—	—	—
2012–13	Sibir Novosibirsk	KHL	38	3	1	4	10	7	0	0	0	2
2013–14	Sibir Novosibirsk	KHL	31	2	5	7	16	10	0	4	4	8
2013–14	Zauralie Kurgan	VHL	6	2	1	3	0	—	—	—	—	—
2014–15	Sibir Novosibirsk	KHL	52	16	8	24	50	12	2	0	2	27
2015–16	Sibir Novosibirsk	KHL	59	20	13	33	32	10	4	6	10	4
2016–17	Sibir Novosibirsk	KHL	54	16	21	37	35	—	—	—	—	—
2017–18	CSKA Moscow	KHL	47	17	23	40	42	11	2	2	4	8
2018–19	Hershey Bears	AHL	10	3	1	4	2	—	—	—	—	—
2018–19	Springfield Thunderbirds	AHL	3	1	0	1	2	—	—	—	—	—
2018–19	Avangard Omsk	KHL	21	5	12	17	6	19	12	5	17	10
2019–20	Avangard Omsk	KHL	58	17	24	41	34	6	3	4	7	4
2020–21	Avangard Omsk	KHL	28	8	5	13	18	—	—	—	—	—
2020–21	Avtomobilist Yekaterinburg	KHL	6	0	0	0	6	—	—	—	—	—
2021–22	Avtomobilist Yekaterinburg	KHL	38	10	15	25	24	—	—	—	—	—
2022–23	Traktor Chelyabinsk	KHL	18	2	2	4	8	—	—	—	—	—
2022–23	Dinamo Minsk	KHL	11	0	1	1	2	1	0	0	0	0
2023–24	Lada Togliatti	KHL	53	15	12	27	24	3	0	0	0	0
KHL totals			515	131	142	273	307	79	23	21	44	63
