= Roman Rukavishnikov =

Russian ice hockey player

- Born: July 20, 1992 (age 32); Moscow, Russia
- Height: 6 ft 2 in (188 cm)
- Weight: 214 lb (97 kg; 15 st 4 lb)
- Position: Defence
- Shoots: Left
- KHL team Former teams: Spartak Moscow; Atlant Moscow Oblast; SKA Saint Petersburg; Ak Bars Kazan
- Playing career: 2011–present

Roman Rukavishnikov (born July 20, 1992) is a Russian professional ice hockey defenceman who currently plays for HC Spartak Moscow of the Kontinental Hockey League (KHL).

During his sixth season with SKA Saint Petersburg in the 2019–20 season, Rukavishnikov was traded alongside Viktor Tikhonov to Ak Bars Kazan in exchange for Igor Ozhiganov on 7 November 2019.

Following two further seasons with Ak Bars, Rukavishnikov returned to SKA Saint Petersburg as a free agent on 1 May 2022, signing a three-year contract. After just one season into his second tenure with SKA, Rukavishnikov left the club to sign a two-year contract with HC Spartak Moscow on 24 July 2023.

== Awards and honors ==
Award	Year
KHL
Gagarin Cup (SKA Saint Petersburg)	2015, 2017
