= Alexander Yevseyenkov =

Russian ice hockey player

Alexandr Yevseyenko
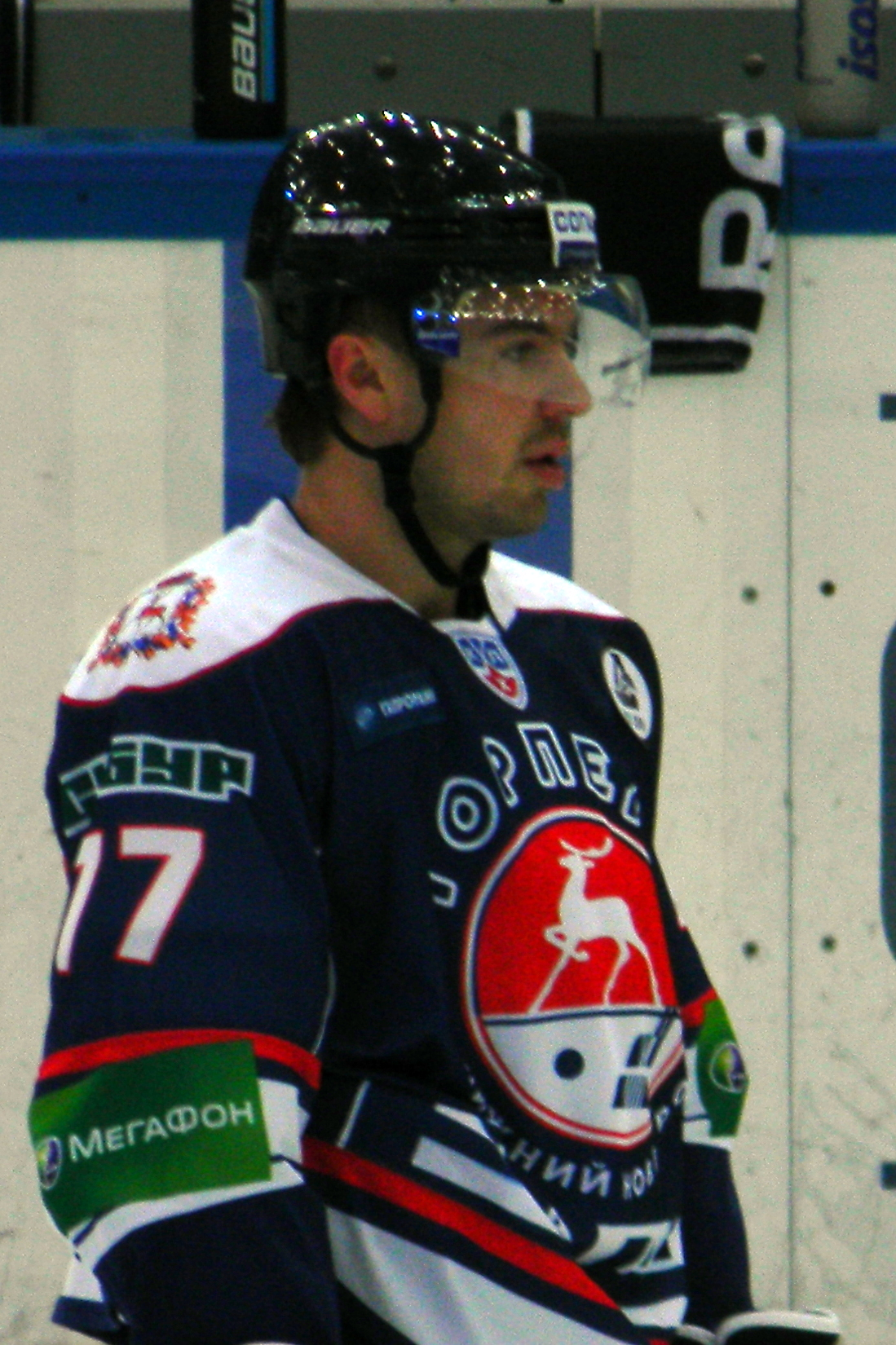
- Born: October 2, 1985 (age 40) Malakhovka, Russian SFSR
- Height: 5 ft 8 in (173 cm)
- Weight: 194 lb (88 kg; 13 st 12 lb)
- Position: Defense
- Shot: Left
- Played for: Torpedo Nizhny Novgorod; Severstal Cherepovets; Neftekhimik Nizhnekamsk; HC Vityaz; Kunlun Red Star; HC Lada Togliatti
- Playing career: 2010–2024

Alexander Yevseyenkov (sometimes listed as Alexandr Yevseyenkov) (born 2 October 1985) is a Russian professional ice hockey player who is currently playing for HC Lada Togliatti in the Supreme Hockey League (VHL).

After two seasons in his second tenure with Severstal Cherepovets, Yevseyenkov left the club as a free agent prior to the 2018–19 season, and signed a two-year contract with Russian club, HC Vityaz of the KHL, on May 4, 2018.

== Career statistics ==
			Regular season					Playoffs
Season	Team	League	GP	G	A	Pts	PIM	GP	G	A	Pts	PIM
2000–01	HC CSKA Moscow-2	Russia3	4	0	0	0	4	—	—	—	—	—
2001–02	HC CSKA Moscow-2	Russia3	23	0	2	2	4	—	—	—	—	—
2002–03	HC CSKA Moscow-2	Russia3	32	3	5	8	47	—	—	—	—	—
2003–04	HC CSKA Moscow-2	Russia3	66	2	23	25	70	—	—	—	—	—
2004–05	Velkom Istra	Russia3	36	5	12	17	77	—	—	—	—	—
2005–06	HK Dmitrov	Russia2	34	6	6	12	26	4	0	0	0	2
2005–06	HK Dmitrov-2	Russia3	24	3	8	11	14	—	—	—	—	—
2006–07	HK Dmitrov	Russia2	50	2	8	10	30	11	1	1	2	2
2006–07	HK Dmitrov-2	Russia4	1	0	0	0	2	—	—	—	—	—
2007–08	HK Dmitrov	Russia2	54	1	20	21	28	7	0	3	3	6
2008–09	HK Dmitrov	Russia2	66	6	22	28	44	14	2	3	5	6
2009–10	Toros Neftekamsk	Russia2	48	8	19	27	18	15	0	7	7	10
2010–11	Torpedo Nizhny Novgorod	KHL	51	2	8	10	49	—	—	—	—	—
2011–12	Torpedo Nizhny Novgorod	KHL	45	5	12	17	22	13	0	7	7	6
2012–13	Torpedo Nizhny Novgorod	KHL	42	1	18	19	18	—	—	—	—	—
2013–14	Torpedo Nizhny Novgorod	KHL	2	0	0	0	0	—	—	—	—	—
2013–14	Severstal Cherepovets	KHL	35	3	7	10	39	—	—	—	—	—
2014–15	HC Neftekhimik Nizhnekamsk	KHL	53	2	14	16	26	—	—	—	—	—
2015–16	HC Neftekhimik Nizhnekamsk	KHL	52	0	8	8	20	1	0	0	0	4
2016–17	Severstal Cherepovets	KHL	52	3	6	9	14	—	—	—	—	—
2017–18	Severstal Cherepovets	KHL	49	6	14	20	16	4	0	0	0	4
2018–19	HC Vityaz	KHL	57	2	12	14	45	4	1	0	1	2
2019–20	HC Vityaz	KHL	51	1	14	15	14	2	0	0	0	0
2020–21	Kunlun Red Star	KHL	12	0	1	1	6	—	—	—	—	—
2021–22	HC Lada Togliatti	VHL	51	1	26	27	14	8	0	5	5	2
2022–23	Buran Voronezh	VHL	39	2	11	13	20	—	—	—	—	—
2023–24	Yugra Khanty-Mansiysk	VHL	24	4	5	9	10	—	—	—	—	—
2023–24	HC Tambov	VHL	15	0	4	4	10	7	0	0	0	4
KHL totals			501	25	114	139	269	24	1	7	8	16
VHL totals			129	7	46	53	54	15	0	5	5	6
Russia2 totals			252	23	75	98	146	51	3	14	17	26
