= Denis Barantsev =

Russian ice hockey player

- Born: April 12, 1992 (age 33) Togliatti, Russia
- Height: 6 ft 0 in (183 cm)
- Weight: 196 lb (89 kg; 14 st 0 lb)
- Position: Defence
- Shoots: Left
- VHL team Former teams: HC Zvezda Moscow; Dynamo Moscow; Lada Togliatti; Torpedo Nizhny Novgorod; Lokomotiv Yaroslavl; Avtomobilist Yekaterinburg
- Playing career: 2009–present

Denis Barantsev (born April 12, 1992) is a Russian professional ice hockey defenceman who plays for Zvezda Moscow of the Supreme Hockey League (VHL).

Barantsev made his KHL with HC Dynamo Moscow during the 2011–12 season.
