= Konstantin Okulov =

Russian ice hockey player (born 1995)

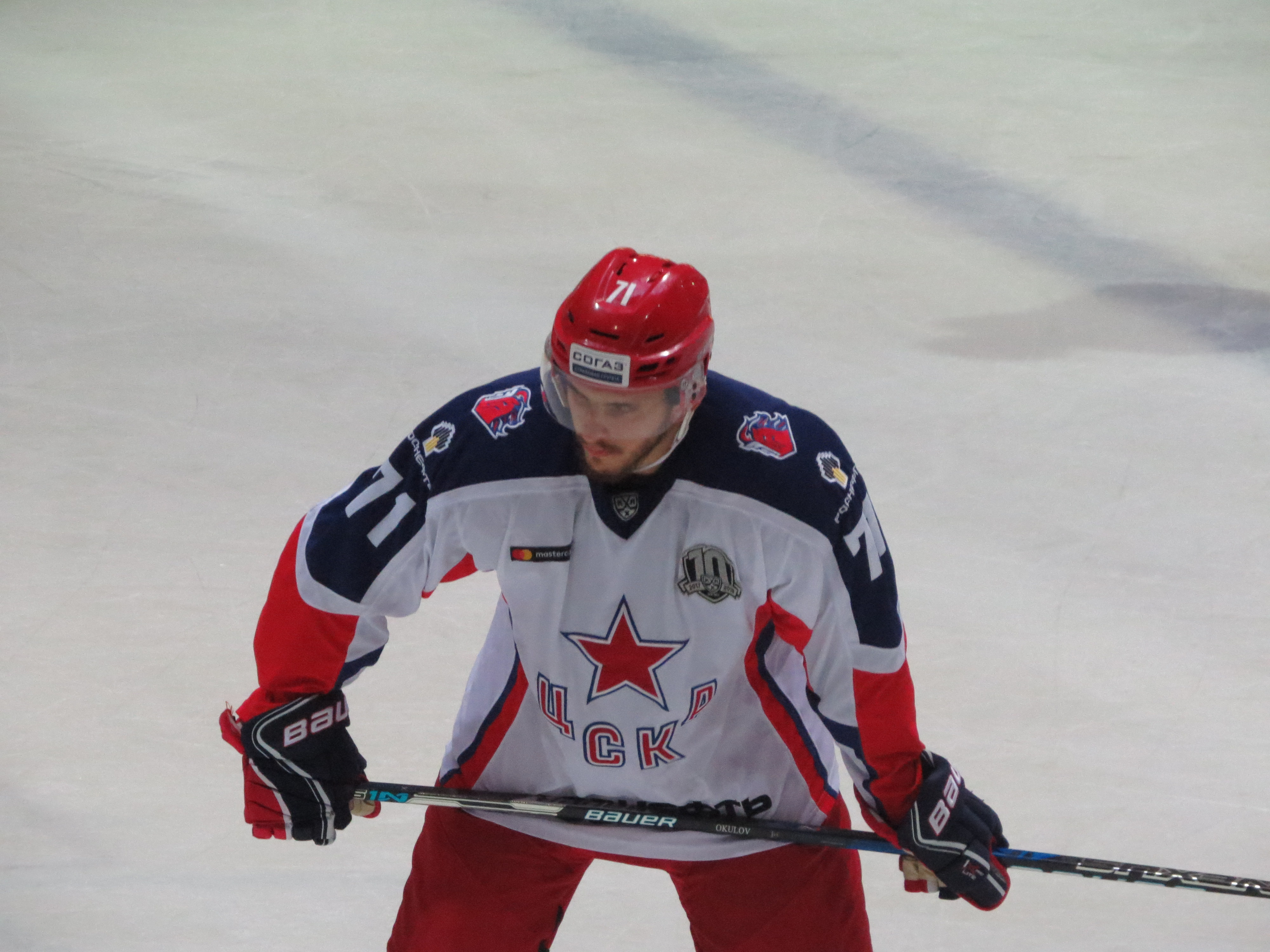
- Born: 18 February 1995 (age 30) Novosibirsk, Russia
- Height: 6 ft 0 in (183 cm)
- Weight: 185 lb (84 kg; 13 st 3 lb)
- Position: Forward
- Shoots: Left
- KHL team Former teams: Avangard Omsk; Sibir Novosibirsk; CSKA Moscow
- National team: Russia
- Playing career: 2013–present

Konstantin Okulov (born 18 February 1995) is a Russian professional ice hockey Forward currently playing for Avangard Omsk in the Kontinental Hockey League (KHL).

== Career statistics ==
=== International ===
Year	Team	Event	Result	GP	G	A	Pts	PIM
2021	ROC	WC	5th	1	0	0	0	0
Senior totals				1	0	0	0	0

== Awards and honors ==
Award	Year
MHL
All-Star Game	2014
KHL
Gagarin Cup (CSKA Moscow)	2019, 2022, 2023
