= Alexander Kucheryavenko =

Russian ice hockey player

- Born: August 27, 1987 (age 38) Belgorod, Soviet Union
- Height: 5 ft 11 in (180 cm)
- Weight: 192 lb (87 kg; 13 st 10 lb)
- Position: Centre
- Shoots: Right
- VHL team Former teams: Dynamo Saint Petersburg; Spartak Moscow; Salavat Yulaev Ufa; SKA Saint Petersburg; HC Vityaz; Avangard Omsk; Avtomobilist Yekaterinburg; Neftekhimik Nizhnekamsk; Dynamo Moscow
- Playing career: 2005–present

Alexander Kucheryavenko (born August 27, 1987) is a Russian professional ice hockey centre. He is currently playing for Dynamo Saint Petersburg of the Supreme Hockey League (VHL).

Kucheryavenko made his KHL debut playing with SKA Saint Petersburg during the inaugural 2008–09 KHL season.
