= Alexei Bondarev =

Russian ice hockey player (born 1983)

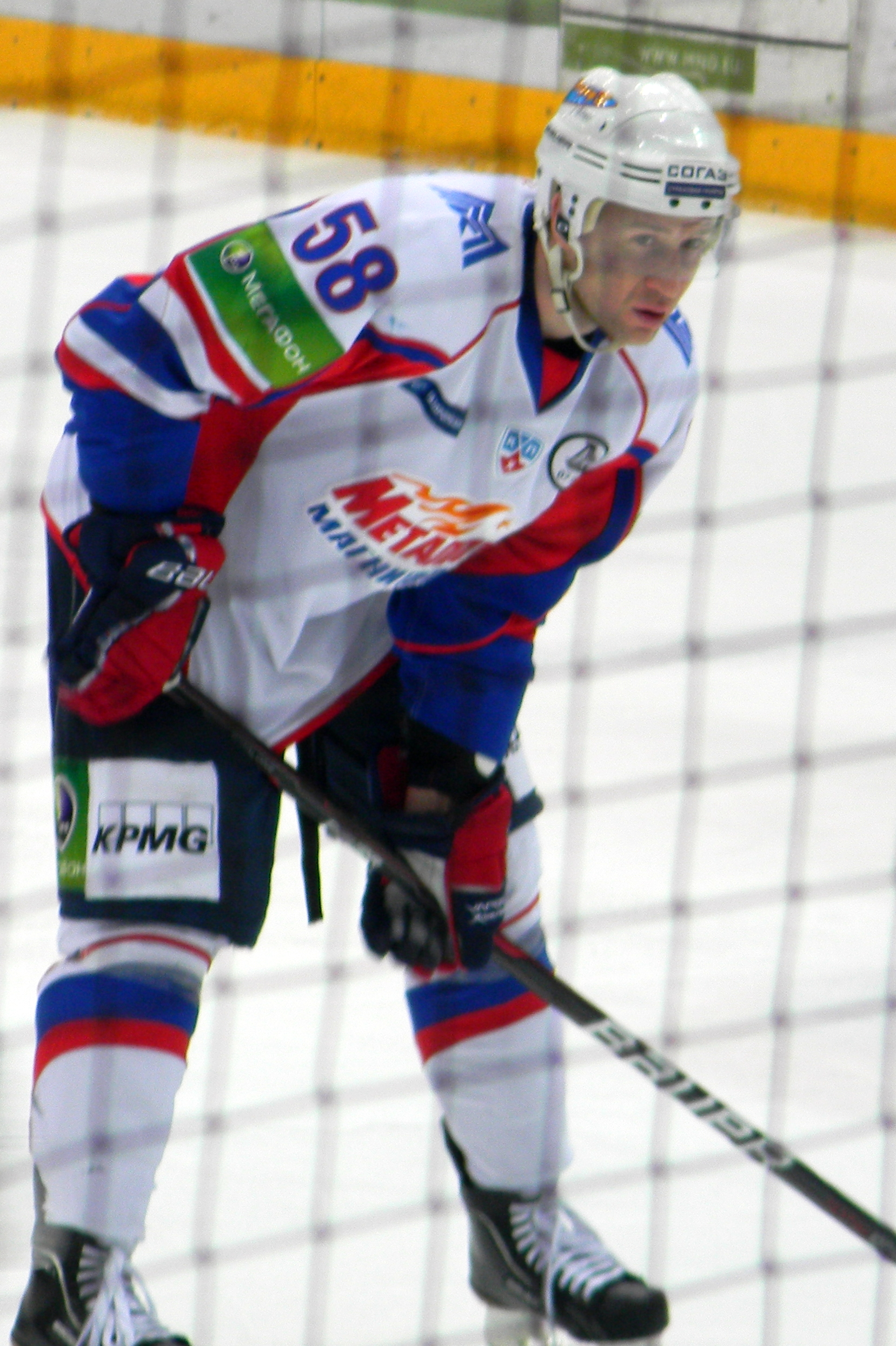
- Born: January 9, 1983 (age 43) Oskemen, Kazakhstan
- Height: 6 ft 2 in (188 cm)
- Weight: 183 lb (83 kg; 13 st 1 lb)
- Position: Defence
- Shoots: Left
- KHL team Former teams: Free Agent; Mechel Chelyabinsk; Avangard Omsk; Spartak Moscow; Lokomotiv Yaroslavl; Avangard Omsk; Metallurg Magnitogorsk; Traktor Chelyabinsk; CSKA Moscow; Neftekhimik Nizhnekamsk
- Playing career: 1999–present

Alexei Andreevich Bondarev (Russian: Алексей Андреевич Бондарев; born January 9, 1983) is a Russian professional ice hockey defenceman who is now retired. He most recently played under contract with Avangard Omsk in the Kontinental Hockey League (KHL). He previously played with HC Spartak Moscow for a second stint after previously appearing with HC CSKA Moscow from Traktor Chelyabinsk and formerly Metallurg Magnitogorsk He signed a one-year contract with CSKA on May 14, 2014.
