= Vasily Demchenko =

Russian ice hockey player (born 1994)

- Born: March 16, 1994 (age 32) Chelyabinsk, Russia
- Height: 6 ft 2 in (188 cm)
- Weight: 165 lb (75 kg; 11 st 11 lb)
- Position: Goaltender
- Catches: Left
- KHL team Former teams: Dinamo Minsk; Traktor Chelyabinsk; Metallurg Magnitogorsk; Avangard Omsk; Admiral Vladivostok
- NHL draft: Undrafted
- Playing career: 2013–present

Vasili Demchenko (born March 16, 1994) is a Russian professional ice hockey goaltender for HC Dinamo Minsk of the Kontinental Hockey League (KHL).

== Playing career ==
Demchenko originally played as a youth within local club, Traktor Chelyabinsk. Undrafted, he made his professional debut in the Kontinental Hockey League, appearing in 1 game during the 2013–14 season.

Assuming starting goaltender duties from the 2015–16 season, Demchenko made 198 appearances with Traktor Chelyabinsk before transferring during the 2019–20 season to Metallurg Magnitogorsk on December 3, 2019. He made 14 further appearances with Magnitogorsk, collecting just 2 wins.

As a free agent on 21 April 2020, Demchenko was signed to a one-year, entry-level contract with the Montreal Canadiens. In the pandemic delayed 2020–21 season, Demchenko was reassigned to join the Canadiens American Hockey League (AHL) affiliate, the Laval Rocket. With his season interrupted through injury, Demchenko appeared in just 4 games with the Rocket, posting 3 wins.

On 19 May 2021, Demchenko as an impending restricted free agent opted to leave the Montreal Canadiens and return to Russia in signing a one-year contract with newly crowned KHL Champions, Avangard Omsk.

== Career statistics ==
			Regular season									Playoffs
Season	Team	League	GP	W	L	OT	MIN	GA	SO	GAA	SV%	GP	W	L	MIN	GA	SO	GAA	SV%
2010–11	Belye Medvedi	MHL	4	1	0	2	85	3	0	2.12	.927	—	—	—	—	—	—	—	—
2011–12	Belye Medvedi	MHL	53	16	28	7	2844	158	0	3.33	.887	—	—	—	—	—	—	—	—
2012–13	Belye Medvedi	MHL	53	35	14	2	3014	112	7	2.23	.924	5	2	3	275	14	0	3.05	.901
2013–14	Belye Medvedi	MHL	28	24	2	2	1658	37	5	1.34	.947	15	10	5	895	29	2	1.94	.922
2013–14	Traktor Chelyabinsk	KHL	1	0	0	0	28	2	0	4.24	.857	—	—	—	—	—	—	—	—
2013–14	Chelmet Chelyabinsk	VHL	9	1	6	2	539	23	0	2.56	.898	—	—	—	—	—	—	—	—
2014–15	Chelmet Chelyabinsk	VHL	12	6	5	1	665	24	1	2.16	.926	—	—	—	—	—	—	—	—
2014–15	Traktor Chelyabinsk	KHL	18	7	7	2	978	41	0	2.51	.912	3	1	1	151	6	0	2.39	.891
2014–15	Belye Medvedi	MHL	1	1	0	0	60	2	0	2.00	.931	6	4	2	335	16	0	2.86	.910
2015–16	Traktor Chelyabinsk	KHL	48	16	20	10	2797	108	3	2.32	.922	—	—	—	—	—	—	—	—
2016–17	Traktor Chelyabinsk	KHL	35	15	14	5	1922	69	4	2.15	.933	1	0	0	38	1	0	1.60	.941
2017–18	Traktor Chelyabinsk	KHL	28	13	10	3	1418	58	2	2.45	.931	5	2	3	278	11	0	2.37	.943
2018–19	Traktor Chelyabinsk	KHL	46	21	18	2	2507	92	5	2.20	.932	2	0	2	119	8	0	4.05	.889
2019–20	Traktor Chelyabinsk	KHL	22	7	11	1	1203	56	0	2.79	.908	—	—	—	—	—	—	—	—
2019–20	Metallurg Magnitogorsk	KHL	14	2	6	2	554	25	0	2.71	.906	—	—	—	—	—	—	—	—
2020–21	Laval Rocket	AHL	4	3	0	1	240	9	0	2.25	.905	—	—	—	—	—	—	—	—
2021–22	Avangard Omsk	KHL	9	4	3	1	475	15	1	1.89	.928	2	0	0	53	1	0	1.12	.958
2022–23	Avangard Omsk	KHL	55	30	16	4	3182	106	3	2.00	.928	14	9	5	882	29	0	1.97	.933
2023–24	Avangard Omsk	KHL	11	5	6	0	568	31	1	3.28	.872	—	—	—	—	—	—	—	—
2023–24	Admiral Vladivostok	KHL	22	6	11	3	1225	54	1	2.65	.920	—	—	—	—	—	—	—	-
2024–25	Admiral Vladivostok	KHL	18	8	6	0	923	41	1	2.66	.917	—	—	—	—	—	—	—	-
2024–25	Dinamo Minsk	KHL	28	18	7	1	1616	46	5	1.71	.933	10	5	5	603	23	2	2.29	.923
2025–26	Dinamo Minsk	KHL	29	13	12	2	1613	64	1	2.38	.911	2	0	1	77	3	0	2.34	.906
KHL totals			384	165	147	36	21,010	808	27	2.31	.923	39	17	17	2,200	82	2	2.24	.927
