= Balashikha Arena =

Coordinates: 55°47′54″N 37°56′19″E

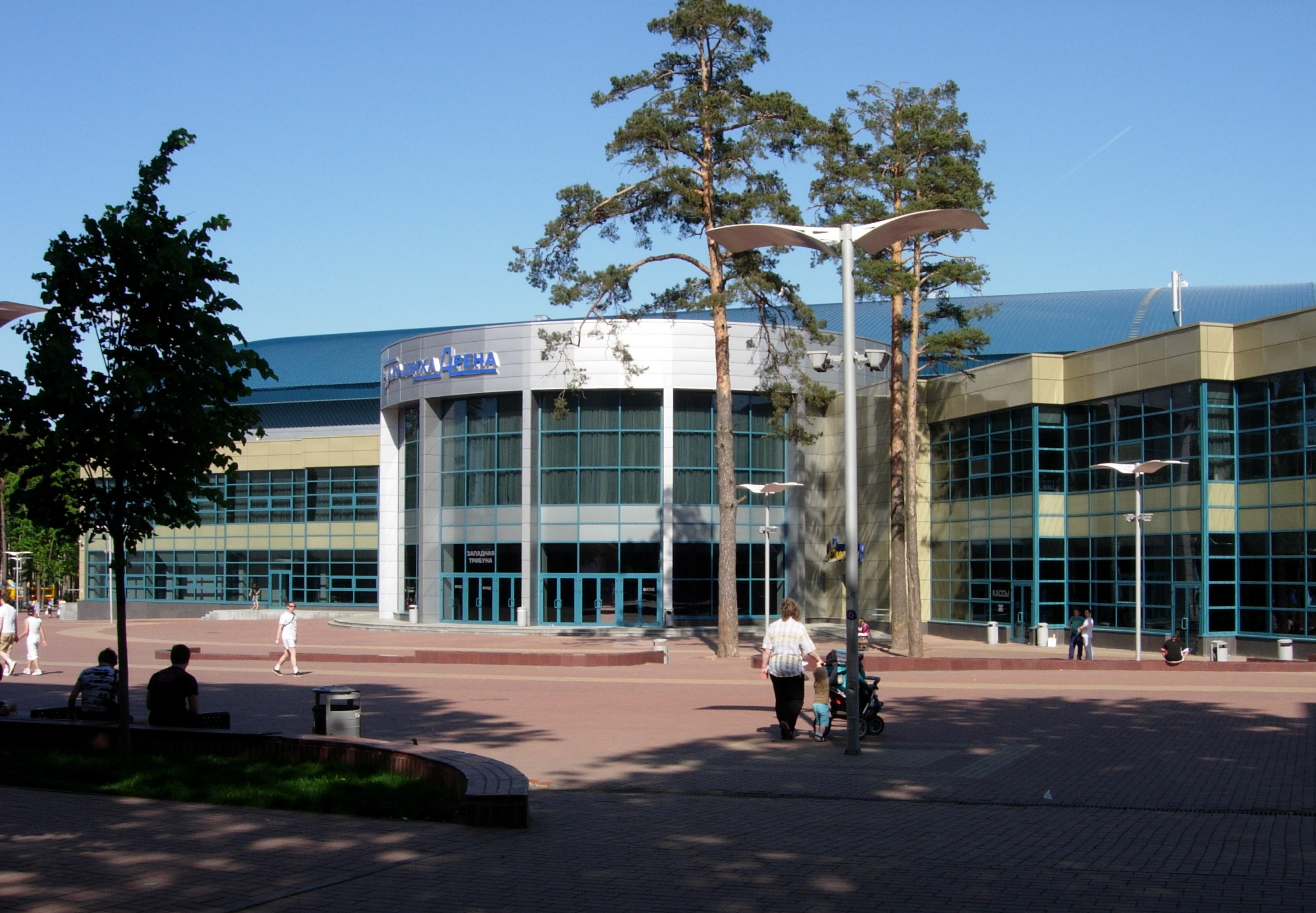
- Interactive map of Balashikha Arena
- Address: Balashikha; Russia
- Capacity: 5,525 spectators (ice hockey); 6,090 spectators (concerts)

Construction
- Opened: September 9th, 2007

Tenants
- HC MVD 2007-2010 Avangard Omsk 2018-2019 HC Vityaz 2022-

Website
- https://balashiha-icearena.com/

The Balashikha Arena is a 5,678-seat multi-purpose arena in Balashikha, Russia. Opened in 2007, it replaced Vityaz Ice Palace as the home of HC MVD, a Kontinental Hockey League ice hockey team.

The 2017 national rink bandy cup took place in the arena.

== Schools and divisions ==
On the territory of the Arena "Balashikha" there is a children's and youth sports school "Olympian" (ice hockey and figure skating sections). 1,000 children and adolescents attend the school. There are 18 groups of figure skating, and 13 hockey teams.

At the complex territory, the branch of the Todes dance school-studio is opened.

== See also ==
- List of indoor arenas in Russia
- List of Kontinental Hockey League arenas

Preceded by Arena Omsk	Home of Avangard Omsk; 2018–2022 (temporary)	Succeeded by G-Drive Arena
