= Artyom Zagidulin =

Russian ice hockey player (born 1995)

- Born: 8 August 1995 (age 31) Magnitogorsk, Russia
- Height: 6 ft 2 in (188 cm)
- Weight: 181 lb (82 kg; 12 st 13 lb)
- Position: Goaltender
- Catches: Left
- KHL team Former teams: Spartak Moscow; Metallurg Magnitogorsk; Kunlun Red Star; Calgary Flames; Lukko; Neftekhimik Nizhnekamsk
- NHL draft: Undrafted
- Playing career: 2015–present

Artyom Rinatovich Zagidulin (Russian: Артём Ринатович Загидулин; born 8 August 1995) is a Russian professional ice hockey goaltender who is currently playing with HC Spartak Moscow in the Kontinental Hockey League (KHL).

== Playing career ==
Prior to NHL, he played for Metallurg Magnitogorsk and Kunlun Red Star of the Kontinental Hockey League (KHL).

On 30 March 2019, Zagidulin signed as an undrafted free agent to a one-year, entry-level contract with the Calgary Flames of the National Hockey League (NHL). After attending the Flames 2019 training camp, Zagidulin was assigned to begin the 2019–20 season with AHL affiliate, the Stockton Heat.

In his first season in North America, Zagidulin made 30 appearances with the Heat, establishing a record of 16-7-4 with a 3.07 goals against average and a .898 save percentage. As an impending restricted free agent, Zagidullin was signed to a one-year extension with the Flames on 16 June 2020.

Leaving the Flames after parts of two seasons within the organization, Zagidulin familiarly returned to begin the 2021–22 season with Metallurg Magnitogorsk of the KHL. Used sparingly in featuring in just 3 games, Zagidulin opted to leave Magnitogorsk, joining Finnish club, Lukko of the Liiga, for the remainder of the season on 18 November 2021.

Following the completion of his second season in the Liiga with Lukko, Zagidulin opted again to rejoin his hometown club, Metallurg Magnitogorsk of the KHL, signing a one-year contract for the 2023–24 season on 6 May 2023. Zagidulin registered 12 wins through 22 appearances in his return with Metallurg, before he was released and immediately joined HC Neftekhimik Nizhnekamsk on 27 December 2023.

== Career statistics ==
			Regular season									Playoffs
Season	Team	League	GP	W	L	OT	MIN	GA	SO	GAA	SV%	GP	W	L	MIN	GA	SO	GAA	SV%
2012–13	Stalnye Lisy	MHL	4	0	3	1	179	14	0	4.69	.859	—	—	—	—	—	—	—	—
2013–14	Stalnye Lisy	MHL	35	14	18	1	1969	94	1	2.86	.905	3	1	1	160	8	0	3.00	.886
2014–15	Stalnye Lisy	MHL	38	14	16	7	2045	89	3	2.61	.919	7	2	4	328	21	0	3.85	.892
2014–15	Yuzhny Ural Orsk	VHL	3	2	1	0	179	2	1	0.67	.975	—	—	—	—	—	—	—	—
2015–16	Yuzhny Ural Orsk	VHL	14	2	6	5	737	32	0	2.61	.907	—	—	—	—	—	—	—	—
2015–16	Stalnye Lisy	MHL	4	1	1	1	235	5	1	1.28	.951	5	1	4	239	10	0	2.52	.919
2015–16	Metallurg Magnitogorsk	KHL	1	0	1	0	33	1	0	1.81	.929	—	—	—	—	—	—	—	—
2016–17	Metallurg Magnitogorsk	KHL	4	0	1	0	76	1	0	0.78	.962	—	—	—	—	—	—	—	—
2016–17	Kunlun Red Star	KHL	6	3	3	0	327	8	1	1.47	.947	—	—	—	—	—	—	—	—
2016–17	Yuzhny Ural Orsk	VHL	9	5	3	1	518	14	3	1.62	.934	—	—	—	—	—	—	—	—
2017–18	Zauralie Kurgan	VHL	40	23	12	3	2401	74	5	1.85	.938	8	4	4	456	20	1	2.63	.926
2018–19	Metallurg Magnitogorsk	KHL	25	12	7	3	1103	36	4	1.96	.924	4	1	1	212	6	0	1.70	.928
2019–20	Stockton Heat	AHL	30	16	7	4	1603	82	2	3.07	.898	—	—	—	—	—	—	—	—
2020–21	Metallurg Magnitogorsk	KHL	5	1	3	0	226	16	0	4.24	.869	—	—	—	—	—	—	—	—
2020–21	Calgary Flames	NHL	1	0	0	0	28	2	0	4.25	.818	—	—	—	—	—	—	—	—
2020–21	Stockton Heat	AHL	6	3	3	0	357	17	0	2.86	.911	—	—	—	—	—	—	—	—
2021–22	Metallurg Magnitogorsk	KHL	3	0	1	1	111	7	0	3.79	.837	—	—	—	—	—	—	—	—
2021–22	Lukko	Liiga	24	11	5	8	1435	56	2	2.34	.900	5	1	4	261	11	0	2.53	.905
2022–23	Lukko	Liiga	53	24	16	13	3162	97	7	1.84	.919	6	2	3	336	12	0	2.14	.916
2023–24	Metallurg Magnitogorsk	KHL	22	12	5	3	1177	45	2	2.29	.912	—	—	—	—	—	—	—	—
2023–24	Neftekhimik Nizhnekamsk	KHL	4	1	2	0	215	8	0	2.24	.922	—	—	—	—	—	—	—	—
2024–25	Neftekhimik Nizhnekamsk	KHL	20	5	9	3	976	45	1	2.77	.919	—	—	—	—	—	—	—	—
2024–25	Spartak Moscow	KHL	17	8	4	1	855	36	1	2.53	.921	10	5	5	611	27	1	2.65	.929
2025–26	Spartak Moscow	KHL	36	14	12	6	1880	96	2	3.06	.904	—	—	—	—	—	—	—	—
KHL totals			143	56	48	17	6,980	299	11	2.57	.913	14	6	6	823	33	1	2.41	.929
NHL totals			1	0	0	0	28	2	0	4.25	.818	—	—	—	—	—	—	—	—
