= Alexander Sudnitsin =

Russian ice hockey player (born 1987)

- Born: November 21, 1987 (age 38) Krasnoyarsk, Russian SFSR
- Height: 6 ft 0 in (183 cm)
- Weight: 179 lb (81 kg; 12 st 11 lb)
- Position: Goaltender
- Caught: Left
- Played for: Neftekhimik Nizhnekamsk; Lokomotiv Yaroslavl; Traktor Chelyabinsk; Avangard Omsk; IK Oskarshamn; Metallurg Magnitogorsk
- Playing career: 2013–2024

Alexander Sudnitsin (born November 21, 1987) is a Russian former professional ice hockey goaltender, who played in the Kontinental Hockey League (KHL).

== Playing career ==
He has previously played for and joined Lokomotiv Yaroslavl after three seasons as the starting goaltender for fellow KHL outfit HC Neftekhimik Nizhnekamsk on May 4, 2016.

On May 14, 2018, Sudnitsin signed as a free agent for his third KHL club, Traktor Chelyabinsk, agreeing to a two-year contract. After appearing in 24 games for Chelyabinsk in the 2018–19 season, Sudnitsin left early in his contract to sign a one-year contract with Gagarin Cup finalists, Avangard Omsk, on 4 July 2019.

In returning to Traktor Chelyabinsk for the 2020–21 season, Sudnitsin was re-assigned to play exclusively in the VHL with Chelmet Chelyabinsk, collecting 3 wins in 12 games before leaving the club on 14 February 2021, and signing his first contract abroad with Swedish top tier club, IK Oskarshamn of the Swedish Hockey League (SHL).

Sudnitsin returned to Russia for the following 2021–22 season, beginning the campaign with Izhstal Izhevsk in the VHL before returning to original KHL club, Neftekhimik Nizhnekamsk, on 18 October 2021.

On 26 July 2023, Sudnitsin moved to his fifth KHL club, signing a one-year contract with Metallurg Magnitogorsk for the 2023–24 season.

== Awards and honors ==
Award	Year
KHL
Gagarin Cup (Metallurg Magnitogorsk)	2024
