= Georgi Belousov =

Russian professional ice hockey player (born 1990)

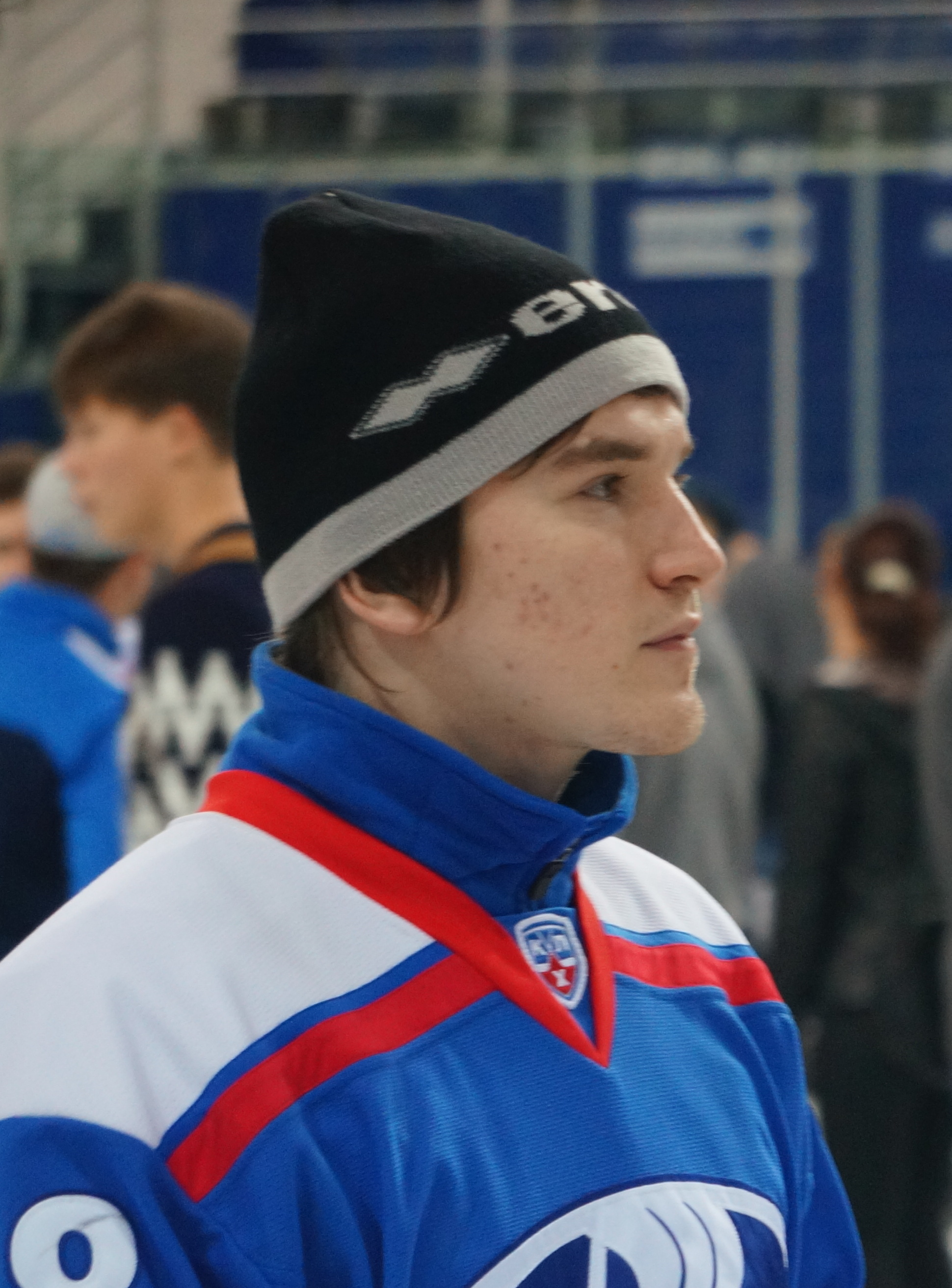
- Born: December 26, 1990 (age 34); Korkino, Russian SFSR
- Height: 5 ft 9 in (175 cm)
- Weight: 198 lb (90 kg; 14 st 2 lb)
- Position: Forward
- Shoots: Right
- KHL team Former teams: Free agent HC Vityaz Podolsk; Neftekhimik Nizhnekamsk; Lada Togliatti; Avtomobilist Yekaterinburg; Sibir Novosibirsk
- Playing career: 2009–present

Georgi Belousov (born December 26, 1990) is a Russian professional ice hockey player who is currently an unrestricted free agent. He most recently played under contract with HC Sibir Novosibirsk in the Kontinental Hockey League (KHL).

Belousov previously played with HC Vityaz Podolsk of the KHL during the 2012–13 season. On June 16, 2014, Belousov signed an initial try-out contract with Lada Togliatti, before he was given a two-year contract on August 21, 2014.

Entering his 15th year in the KHL in the 2023–24 season, Belousov belatedly joined Sibir Novosibirsk on a one-year contract on 15 September 2023.
