= Vyacheslav Litovchenko =

Russian ice hockey player

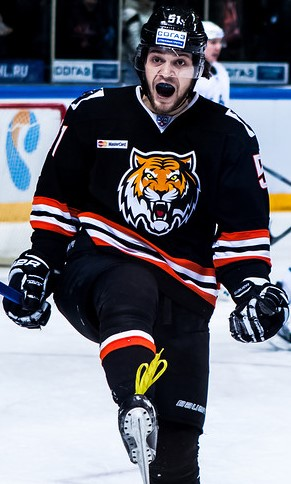
- Born: January 7, 1990 (age 35); Khabarovsk, USSR
- Height: 5 ft 11 in (180 cm)
- Weight: 196 lb (89 kg; 14 st 0 lb)
- Position: Forward
- Shoots: Left
- VHL team Former teams: HC Yugra; Amur Khabarovsk; Avtomobilist Yekaterinburg; Sibir Novosibirsk
- Playing career: 2005–present

Vyacheslav Litovchenko (born January 7, 1990) is a Russian professional ice hockey forward who is currently playing with HC Yugra of the Supreme Hockey League (VHL).

== Playing career ==
Litovchenko has formerly played with Amur Khabarovsk. Having spent the first 13 professional seasons of his career exclusively with Amur Khabarovsk, Litovchenko left as a free agent prior to the 2018–19 season, agreeing to a one-year contract with Avtomobilist Yekaterinburg on May 4, 2018.

After three seasons with Avtomobilist, Litovchenko left as a free agent and joined his third KHL club, HC Sibir Novosibirsk, on a one-year contract on 1 May 2021.

As a free agent following two seasons with Sibir, Litovchenko extended his career in the VHL, signing a contract with HC Yugra on 2 October 2023.
