= Yevgeni Kulik =

Russian ice hockey player

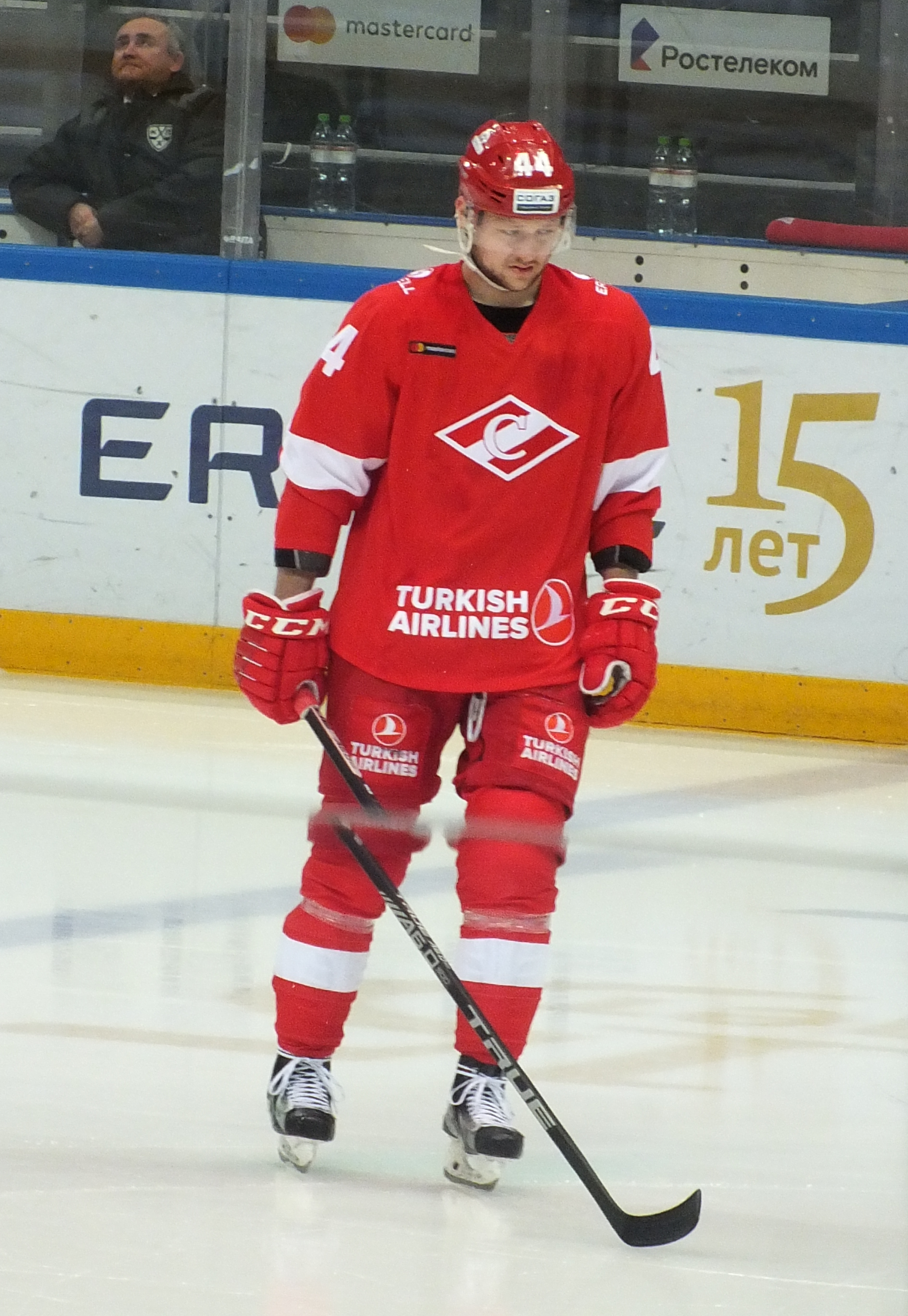
- Kulik in 2018
- Born: 12 June 1993 (age 33) Moscow, Russia
- Height: 6 ft 0 in (183 cm)
- Weight: 205 lb (93 kg; 14 st 9 lb)
- Position: Defence
- Shoots: Left
- KHL team Former teams: Salavat Yulaev Ufa; Spartak Moscow; Avangard Omsk; HC Yugra; Traktor Chelyabinsk; Amur Khabarovsk
- Playing career: 2010–present

Yevgeni Sergeyevich Kulik (Russian: Евгений Сергеевич Кулик; born 12 June 1993) is a Russian professional ice hockey defenceman. He is currently playing with Salavat Yulaev Ufa of the Kontinental Hockey League (KHL).

== Playing career ==
Kulik made his Kontinental Hockey League (KHL) debut playing with HC Spartak Moscow during the 2012–13 KHL season. He has also played with Avangard Omsk and HC Yugra.

Following his sixth season with Spartak after the completion of the 2020–21 season, Kulik left as a free agent and signed a two-year contract with Traktor Chelyabinsk on 4 May 2021. In early December 2022, he was placed on the waiver list.
