= Maxim Osipov (ice hockey, born 1993) =

Russian ice hockey player (born 1993)

- Born: August 31, 1993 (age 33) Yaroslavl, Russia
- Height: 6 ft 1 in (185 cm)
- Weight: 186 lb (84 kg; 13 st 4 lb)
- Position: Defence
- Shoots: Right
- KHL team Former teams: Sibir Novosibirsk; Torpedo Nizhny Novgorod; Salavat Yulaev Ufa; Lokomotiv Yaroslavl; Avtomobilist Yekaterinburg
- Playing career: 2011–present

Maxim Ilyich Osipov (born August 31, 1993) is a Russian professional ice hockey defenceman. He is currently playing with Sibir Novosibirsk of the Kontinental Hockey League (KHL).

== Playing career ==
Osipov made his Kontinental Hockey League debut playing with Torpedo Nizhny Novgorod during the 2014–15 KHL season.

After five seasons with Lokomotiv Yaroslavl, Osipov left as a free agent following the 2022–23 season and was signed to a two-year contract with Avtomobilist Yekaterinburg on 9 June 2023.
