= Ivan Bocharov (ice hockey) =

Russian ice hockey player (born 1995)

- Born: 18 May 1995 (age 31) Moscow, Russia
- Height: 6 ft 2 in (188 cm)
- Weight: 168 lb (76 kg; 12 st 0 lb)
- Position: Goaltender
- Catches: Left
- KHL team Former teams: HC Sochi; Dynamo Moscow; Lokomotiv Yaroslavl; Torpedo Nizhny Novgorod; Lada Togliatti
- National team: Russia
- Playing career: 2017–present

Ivan Kirillovich Bocharov (Russian: Иван Кириллович Бочаров; born 18 May 1995) is a Russian professional ice hockey goaltender currently playing for HC Sochi of the Kontinental Hockey League (KHL).

== Playing career ==
Bocharov made his debut in the KHL during the 2017–18 season, with HC Dynamo Moscow. On 8 May 2020, Bocharov was signed to a two-year contract extension with Dynamo Moscow.

Following his fifth season with Dynamo, Bocharov left as a free agent and signed a two-year contract with Lokomotiv Yaroslavl on 1 May 2022.

At the conclusion of his contract with Lokomotiv, Bocharov left as a free agent and was signed to a one-year contract with his third KHL outfit, Torpedo Nizhny Novgorod on 9 July 2024. In the 2024-25 season, Bocharov collected 12 wins in 35 appearances with Torpedo, registering a .911 save percentage.

Leaving Torpedo at the completion of his contract, Bocharov continued in the KHL in signing a one-year contract with Lada Togliatti on 7 June 2025. After a lone season as the starting goaltender for Togliatti, Bocharov left to sign another one-year contract with Divisional club, HC Sochi, on 3 June 2026.

== Career statistics ==
=== Regular season and playoffs ===
			Regular season									Playoffs
Season	Team	League	GP	W	L	OT	MIN	GA	SO	GAA	SV%	GP	W	L	MIN	GA	SO	GAA	SV%
2012–13	HK MVD	MHL	41	19	17	5	2402	109	2	2.72	.911	6	4	2	360	17	0	2.84	.915
2013–14	HK MVD	MHL	44	33	7	3	2560	81	7	1.90	.930	7	4	3	442	15	1	2.04	.927
2014–15	HK MVD	MHL	31	19	10	1	1790	55	6	1.84	.939	7	4	3	401	16	1	2.40	.901
2015–16	HK MVD	MHL	4	1	2	1	245	10	1	2.46	.925	—	—	—	—	—	—	—	—
2015–16	Sokol Krasnoyarsk	VHL	17	5	9	3	1023	35	3	2.05	.933	—	—	—	—	—	—	—	—
2015–16	Krasnoyarskie Rysi	VHL-B	1	1	0	0	60	1	0	1.00	.971	7	4	2	429	16	0	2.24	.949
2016–17	Dynamo Balashikha	VHL	33	18	11	3	1924	70	3	2.18	.928	19	16	3	1182	31	3	1.57	.951
2017–18	Dynamo Moscow	KHL	21	7	9	3	1106	44	3	2.39	.922	—	—	—	—	—	—	—	—
2018–19	Dynamo Moscow	KHL	38	19	16	1	2114	68	3	1.93	.933	5	2	2	252	9	1	2.15	.937
2019–20	Dynamo Moscow	KHL	49	26	13	5	2639	87	6	1.98	.935	1	0	1	76	5	0	3.98	.898
2020–21	Dynamo Moscow	KHL	31	19	8	1	1711	67	4	2.35	.915	7	3	3	380	12	0	1.89	.931
2021–22	Dynamo Moscow	KHL	37	19	11	3	2089	83	3	2.38	.912	5	0	4	223	15	0	4.04	.858
2022–23	Lokomotiv Yaroslavl	KHL	32	16	11	2	1839	58	7	1.89	.924	—	—	—	—	—	—	—	—
2023–24	Lokomotiv Yaroslavl	KHL	12	5	4	1	661	22	2	2.00	.922	—	—	—	—	—	—	—	—
2024–25	Torpedo Nizhny Novgorod	KHL	35	12	15	4	1975	91	3	2.76	.911	—	—	—	—	—	—	—	—
2025–26	Lada Togliatti	KHL	43	11	24	5	2357	126	0	3.21	.908	—	—	—	—	—	—	—	—
KHL totals			298	134	111	25	16,489	646	31	2.35	.920	18	5	10	929	41	1	2.65	.913

=== International ===
Year	Team	Event	Result	GP	W	L	T	MIN	GA	SO	GAA	SV%
2013	Russia	U18	4th	1	1	0	0	48	2	0	2.52	.882
2021	ROC	WC	5th	1	1	0	0	60	1	0	1.00	.909
Junior Totals				1	1	0	0	48	2	0	2.52	.882
Senior Totals				1	1	0	0	60	1	0	1.00	.909
