= Ilya Konovalov (ice hockey) =

Russian ice hockey player

- Born: 13 July 1998 (age 28) Yaroslavl, Russia
- Height: 5 ft 11 in (180 cm)
- Weight: 196 lb (89 kg; 14 st 0 lb)
- Position: Goaltender
- Catches: Left
- KHL team Former teams: Salavat Yulaev Ufa; Lokomotiv Yaroslavl; Bakersfield Condors; Dynamo Moscow; Admiral Vladivostok
- NHL draft: 85th overall, 2019; Edmonton Oilers
- Playing career: 2018–present

Ilya Gennadievich Konovalov (Russian: Илья Геннадиевич Коновалов; born 13 July 1998) is a Russian professional ice hockey goaltender who plays for Salavat Yulaev Ufa of the Kontinental Hockey League (KHL).

== Playing career ==
Konovalov made his professional debut in his native Russia, with Lokomotiv Yaroslavl in the Kontinental Hockey League. He won the Rookie of the Year award for the 2018–19 KHL season.

He was selected by the Edmonton Oilers in the third-round, 85th overall, of the 2019 NHL entry draft.

Following his fourth season with Lokomotiv, Konovalov left after his contract expired and was signed to a two-year, entry-level contract with the Edmonton Oilers on 3 May 2021. In his first North American season in 2021–22, Konovalov was assigned by the Oilers to American Hockey League (AHL) affiliate, the Bakersfield Condors for the entirety of the campaign. He made 17 appearances with the Condors, posting a 5-7-5 record with a 2.73 goals against average.

On 1 May 2022, Konovalov's KHL rights were traded from Lokomotiv to Dynamo Moscow in exchange for financial compensation. On 8 June 2022, Konovalov's tenure with the Oilers ended as he was placed on unconditional waivers to mutually terminate the remaining year of his contract. On 12 June 2022, Konovalov was signed to a two-year contract with Dynamo Moscow through 2024.

Having completed his contracted tenure with Dynamo, Konovalov's KHL negotiating rights were traded to Admiral Vladivostok before the 2024–25 season, on 5 August 2024. He was soon signed to a two-year contract extension with Vladivostok on 8 August 2024.

== Career statistics ==
			Regular season									Playoffs
Season	Team	League	GP	W	L	OT	MIN	GA	SO	GAA	SV%	GP	W	L	MIN	GA	SO	GAA	SV%
2014–15	Loko-Junior Yaroslavl	MHLB	11	7	2	1	513	13	2	1.52	.933	—	—	—	—	—	—	—	—
2015–16	Loko Yaroslavl	MHL	11	7	1	2	603	16	3	1.59	.927	—	—	—	—	—	—	—	—
2015–16	Loko-Junior Yaroslavl	MHLB	16	11	3	1	928	24	3	1.55	.936	—	—	—	—	—	—	—	—
2016–17	Loko Yaroslavl	MHL	32	17	11	3	1,741	55	7	1.90	.920	4	1	3	251	7	1	1.67	.931
2016–17	Loko-Junior Yaroslavl	NMHL	1	0	1	0	59	2	0	2.05	.933	—	—	—	—	—	—	—	—
2017–18	HC Ryazan	VHL	12	3	5	2	598	21	0	2.11	.919	—	—	—	—	—	—	—	—
2017–18	Loko Yaroslavl	MHL	11	9	0	2	669	20	2	1.79	.922	16	12	4	1020	21	4	1.23	.945
2017–18	Lokomotiv Yaroslavl	KHL	7	5	1	0	385	10	0	1.56	.933	—	—	—	—	—	—	—	—
2018–19	Lokomotiv Yaroslavl	KHL	45	25	15	1	2,417	76	10	1.89	.930	8	3	3	422	17	1	2.42	.905
2019–20	Lokomotiv Yaroslavl	KHL	40	14	18	6	2,228	91	4	2.45	.912	5	2	2	214	13	0	3.64	.888
2020–21	Lokomotiv Yaroslavl	KHL	19	9	7	2	1,046	40	0	2.29	.923	—	—	—	—	—	—	—	—
2021–22	Bakersfield Condors	AHL	17	5	7	3	946	43	0	2.73	.893	—	—	—	—	—	—	—	—
2022–23	Dynamo Moscow	KHL	43	22	13	6	2,495	87	3	2.09	.922	5	2	2	273	12	1	2.64	.897
2023–24	Dynamo Moscow	KHL	42	21	12	3	2,346	80	3	2.05	.921	6	2	3	298	14	0	2.82	.883
2024–25	Admiral Vladivostok	KHL	18	4	9	0	786	44	0	3.36	.895	1	0	0	19	2	0	6.35	.800
KHL totals			214	100	75	18	11,703	428	20	2.19	.920	25	9	10	1,226	58	2	2.84	.893
