= Vladimir Galuzin =

Russian ice hockey player

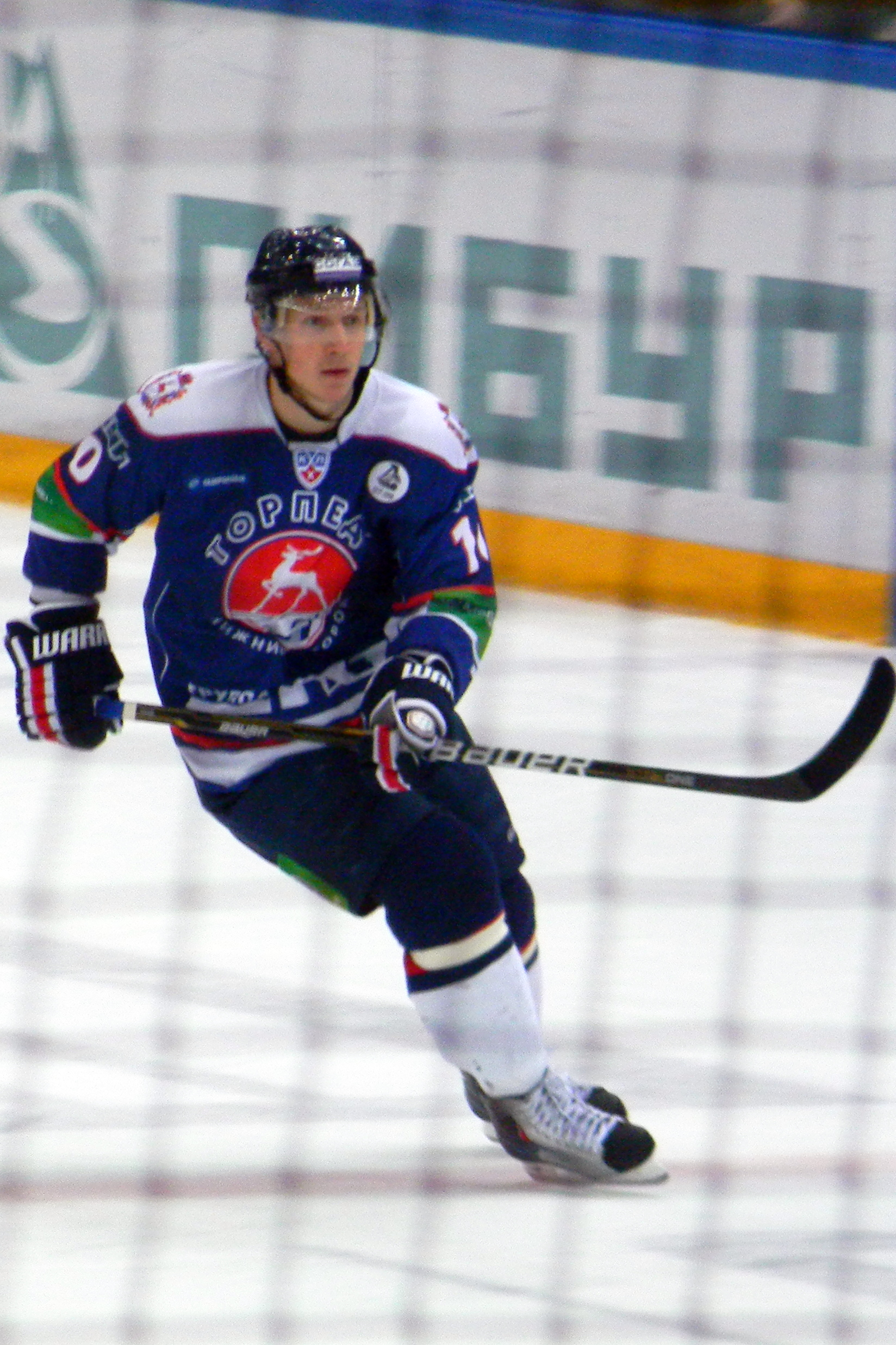
- Born: August 6, 1988 (age 37) Nizhny Novgorod, Russia
- Height: 5 ft 10 in (178 cm)
- Weight: 183 lb (83 kg; 13 st 1 lb)
- Position: Forward
- Shot: Left
- Played for: Torpedo Nizhny Novgorod; Metallurg Magnitogorsk; Ak Bars Kazan; Neftekhimik Nizhnekamsk; Amur Khabarovsk; Spartak Moscow; HC Vityaz
- Playing career: 2007–2025

Vladimir Galuzin (born August 6, 1988) is a Russian former professional ice hockey forward who played in the Kontinental Hockey League (KHL).

== Playing career ==
Galuzin began his Kontinental Hockey League career with Torpedo Nizhny Novgorod, debuting during the league's first season in 2008–09.

Galuzin spent the first fourteen seasons of his pro career with Torpedo, becoming one of the team's longest-serving players before departing as a free agent after the 2018–19 season. On May 1, 2019, he signed a two-year contract with Metallurg Magnitogorsk. However, during the 2019–20 campaign, he struggled to find his form, managing only 1 goal and 2 points in 17 games. As a result, on December 17, 2019, Galuzin and Metallurg mutually agreed to part ways, and he joined his third KHL team, Ak Bars Kazan, on a two-year contract.

On July 4, 2020, Galuzin extended his time in the KHL by signing a one-year deal with HC Neftekhimik Nizhnekamsk. During the 2020–21 season, he appeared in 44 regular season games, tallying 5 goals and a total of 18 points in his only season with the club.

As an unrestricted free agent following the conclusion of his previous contract, Galuzin continued his professional hockey career by signing a one-year contract with Amur Khabarovsk on May 11, 2021. This marked the fifth KHL team of his career, as he sought to bring his veteran experience and offensive skills to the Far East club for the 2021–22 Kontinental Hockey League season.

Following a season in which he divided his time between Amur and Spartak Moscow during 2021–22, Galuzin entered free agency and inked a contract with HC Vityaz on May 4, 2022.

Galuzin ended his 18 year professional career at the conclusion of the 2024–25 season with Vityaz by announcing his retirement on 10 July 2025.
