= 2016–17 KHL season =

- League: Kontinental Hockey League
- Sport: Ice hockey
- Duration: 22 August 2016 – 16 April 2017
- Games: 60
- Teams: 29

Regular season
- Continental Cup winner: (Russia) CSKA Moscow
- Top scorer: (Russia) Sergei Mozyakin

Playoffs
- Western champions: (Russia) SKA Saint Petersburg
- Western runners-up: (Russia) Lokomotiv Yaroslavl
- Eastern champions: (Russia) Metallurg Magnitogorsk
- Eastern runners-up: (Russia) Ak Bars Kazan

Gagarin Cup
- Champions: (Russia) SKA Saint Petersburg
- Runners-up: (Russia) Metallurg Magnitogorsk

KHL seasons
- ← 2015–16 2017–18 →

The 2016–17 KHL season was the ninth season of the Kontinental Hockey League. The season started on 22 August 2016 and ended on 16 April 2017. SKA Saint Petersburg defeated Metallurg Magnitogorsk four games to one to win their second Gagarin Cup Championship in three seasons.

The KHL had the third highest average attendance in Europe, averaging 6,121 spectators, and the highest total attendance in Europe with 5.32 million spectators in the regular season.

== Team changes ==
The Chinese club HC Kunlun Red Star from Beijing, China joined the league, to become its 29th team.

The Russian Club Metallurg Novokuznetsk was relegated due to debt.

== Divisions and regular season format ==
Like in the 2015–16 season, each team played every other team once at home and once on the road, giving a total of 56 games (28 at home, 28 on the road), plus 4 additional games (2 at home, 2 on the road) played by each team against rival clubs from its own conference. Thus, each team played a total of 60 games in the regular season.

How the teams are divided into divisions and conferences is shown in the table below.

Western Conference	Eastern Conference

Bobrov Division	Tarasov Division	Kharlamov Division	Chernyshev Division
(Belarus) Dinamo Minsk	(Russia) CSKA Moscow	(Russia) Ak Bars Kazan	(Russia) Admiral Vladivostok
(Latvia) Dinamo Riga	(Russia) Dynamo Moscow	(Russia) Avtomobilist Yekaterinburg	(Russia) Amur Khabarovsk
(Finland) Jokerit	(Russia) HC Sochi	(Russia) Lada Togliatti	(Russia) Avangard Omsk
(Croatia) Medveščak Zagreb	(Russia) Lokomotiv Yaroslavl	(Russia) Metallurg Magnitogorsk	(Kazakhstan) Barys Astana
(Russia) SKA Saint Petersburg	(Russia) Severstal Cherepovets	(Russia) Neftekhimik Nizhnekamsk	(China) HC Kunlun Red Star
(Slovakia) Slovan Bratislava	(Russia) Torpedo Nizhny Novgorod	(Russia) Traktor Chelyabinsk	(Russia) Metallurg Novokuznetsk
(Russia) Spartak Moscow	(Russia) Vityaz Podolsk	(Russia) Yugra Khanty-Mansiysk	(Russia) Salavat Yulaev Ufa
			(Russia) Sibir Novosibirsk

== League standings ==
=== Western Conference ===
Pos	Team	Pld	W	OTW	OTL	L	GF	GA	GD	Pts	Qualification
1	CSKA Moscow	60	41	3	8	8	183	110	+73	137	Advance to Gagarin Cup Playoffs (Note: Teams leading a division hold one of the first two places of their conference.)
2	SKA Saint Petersburg	60	39	7	6	8	249	114	+135	137	Advance to Gagarin Cup Playoffs
3	Dynamo Moscow	60	29	10	5	16	164	111	+53	112	Advance to Gagarin Cup Playoffs
4	Lokomotiv Yaroslavl	60	32	4	6	18	163	130	+33	110	Advance to Gagarin Cup Playoffs
5	Dinamo Minsk	60	27	10	4	19	171	150	+21	105	Advance to Gagarin Cup Playoffs
6	Torpedo Nizhny Novgorod	60	27	8	7	18	145	124	+21	104	Advance to Gagarin Cup Playoffs
7	Vityaz Podolsk	60	26	7	5	22	162	158	+4	97	Advance to Gagarin Cup Playoffs
8	Jokerit	60	23	6	12	19	149	165	−16	93	Advance to Gagarin Cup Playoffs
9	HC Sochi	60	24	7	2	27	139	145	−6	88	
10	Slovan Bratislava	60	22	7	5	26	144	166	−22	85	
11	Severstal Cherepovets	60	18	5	10	27	133	163	−30	74	
12	Medveščak Zagreb	60	19	4	4	33	138	186	−48	69	
13	Spartak Moscow	60	18	3	6	33	125	168	−43	66	
14	Dinamo Riga	60	11	10	5	34	116	158	−42	58	

Updated to match(es) played on 18 February 2017. Source: KHL
Rules for classification: 1) points; 2) a higher number of wins in the regular time; 3) a higher number of wins in overtime and shootouts; 4) goal difference; 5) number of goals scored; 6) drawing of lots.

=== Eastern Conference ===
Pos	Team	Pld	W	OTW	OTL	L	GF	GA	GD	Pts	Qualification
1	Metallurg Magnitogorsk	60	36	5	6	13	197	135	+62	124	Advance to Gagarin Cup Playoffs (Note: Teams leading a division hold one of the first two places of its conference.)
2	Avangard Omsk	60	30	8	3	19	156	127	+29	109	Advance to Gagarin Cup Playoffs
3	Ak Bars Kazan	60	29	9	4	18	155	127	+28	109	Advance to Gagarin Cup Playoffs
4	Traktor Chelyabinsk	60	27	3	10	20	130	120	+10	97	Advance to Gagarin Cup Playoffs
5	Barys Astana	60	25	6	3	26	151	167	−16	90	Advance to Gagarin Cup Playoffs
6	Salavat Yulaev Ufa	60	21	6	13	20	169	174	−5	88	Advance to Gagarin Cup Playoffs
7	Admiral Vladivostok	60	24	3	8	25	147	153	−6	86	Advance to Gagarin Cup Playoffs
8	HC Kunlun Red Star	60	24	4	3	29	139	144	−5	83	Advance to Gagarin Cup Playoffs
9	Sibir Novosibirsk	60	20	8	7	25	133	138	−5	83	
10	Neftekhimik Nizhnekamsk	60	20	8	4	28	143	155	−12	80	
11	Avtomobilist Yekaterinburg	60	19	6	10	25	139	165	−26	79	
12	Amur Khabarovsk	60	20	5	6	29	110	130	−20	76	
13	Yugra Khanty-Mansiysk	60	18	4	4	34	112	148	−36	66	
14	Lada Togliatti	60	16	5	7	32	146	180	−34	65	
15	Metallurg Novokuznetsk	60	8	6	4	42	97	194	−97	40	

Updated to match(es) played on 18 February 2017. Source: KHL
Rules for classification: 1) points; 2) a higher number of wins in the regular time; 3) a higher number of wins in overtime and shootouts; 4) goal difference; 5) number of goals scored; 6) drawing of lots.

== Gagarin Cup Playoffs ==
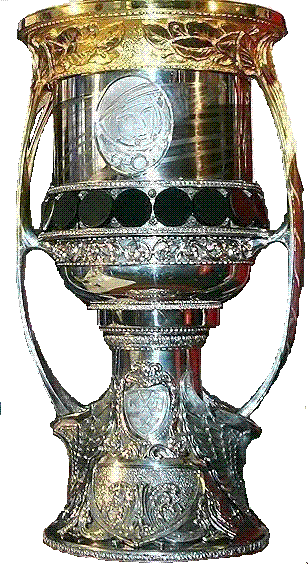
Gagarin Cup

The playoffs started on 21 February 2017, with the top eight teams from each of the conferences and end with the last game of the Gagarin Cup final on 16 April 2017.

=== Bracket ===
Conference Quarterfinals	Conference Semifinals
1	(Russia) Metallurg Mg	4
8	(China) Kunlun Red Star	1
1	(Russia) Metallurg Mg	4
5	(Kazakhstan) Barys	0
2	(Russia) Avangard	4
7	(Russia) Admiral	2
Eastern Conference
3	(Russia) Ak Bars	4
6	(Russia) Salavat Yulaev	1
2	(Russia) Avangard	2
3	(Russia) Ak Bars	4
4	(Russia) Traktor	2
5	(Kazakhstan) Barys	4
1	(Russia) CSKA	4
8	(Finland) Jokerit	0
1	(Russia) CSKA	2
4	(Russia) Lokomotiv	4
2	(Russia) SKA	4
7	(Russia) Vityaz	0
Western Conference
3	(Russia) Dynamo Msk	4
6	(Russia) Torpedo	1
2	(Russia) SKA	4
3	(Russia) Dynamo Msk	1
4	(Russia) Lokomotiv	4
5	(Belarus) Dinamo Mn	1

Conference Finals
1	(Russia) Metallurg Mg	4
3	(Russia) Ak Bars	0
4	(Russia) Lokomotiv	0
2	(Russia) SKA	4

Gagarin Cup Finals
E1	(Russia) Metallurg Mg	1
W2	(Russia) SKA	4

== Final standings ==
Rank	Team
1	(Russia) SKA Saint Petersburg
2	(Russia) Metallurg Magnitogorsk
3	(Russia) Lokomotiv Yaroslavl
4	(Russia) Ak Bars Kazan
5	(Russia) CSKA Moscow
6	(Russia) Dynamo Moscow
7	(Russia) Avangard Omsk
8	(Kazakhstan) Barys Astana
9	(Belarus) Dinamo Minsk
10	(Russia) Torpedo Nizhny Novgorod
11	(Russia) Traktor Chelyabinsk
12	(Russia) Vityaz
13	(Finland) Jokerit
14	(Russia) Salavat Yulaev Ufa
15	(Russia) Admiral Vladivostok
16	(China) HC Kunlun Red Star
17	(Russia) Sochi
18	(Slovakia) Slovan Bratislava
19	(Russia) Sibir Novosibirsk
20	(Russia) Neftekhimik Nizhnekamsk
21	(Russia) Avtomobilist Yekaterinburg
22	(Russia) Amur Khabarovsk
23	(Russia) Severstal Cherepovets
24	(Croatia) Medveščak Zagreb
25	(Russia) Yugra Khanty-Mansiysk
26	(Russia) Spartak Moscow
27	(Russia) Lada Togliatti
28	(Latvia) Dinamo Riga
29	(Russia) Metallurg Novokuznetsk

== Player statistics ==
=== Scoring leaders ===
As of 18 February 2017

Player	Team	GP	G	A	Pts	+/–	PIM
(Russia) Sergei Mozyakin	Metallurg Magnitogorsk	60	48	37	85	+10	4
(Russia) Ilya Kovalchuk	SKA Saint Petersburg	60	32	46	78	+28	47
(Russia) Vadim Shipachyov	SKA Saint Petersburg	50	26	50	76	+33	22
(Russia) Nikita Gusev	SKA Saint Petersburg	57	24	47	71	+33	8
(Russia) Evgenii Dadonov	SKA Saint Petersburg	53	30	36	66	+33	39

Source: KHL

=== Leading goaltenders ===
As of 18 February 2017

Player	Team	GP	Min	W	L	SOP	GA	SO	SV%	GAA
(Russia) Alexander Yeryomenko	Dynamo Moscow	37	2092:48	24	4	5	45	9	.950	1.29
(Czech Republic) Pavel Francouz	Traktor Chelyabinsk	30	1718:50	14	9	3	41	5	.953	1.43
(Russia) Ilya Sorokin	CSKA Moscow	39	2276:14	25	7	6	61	5	.929	1.61
(Russia) Igor Shestyorkin	SKA Saint Petersburg	39	2190:49	27	4	6	60	8	.937	1.64
(Sweden) Viktor Fasth	CSKA Moscow	21	1169:05	15	2	2	33	4	.929	1.69

Source: KHL

== Awards ==
=== Players of the Month ===
Best KHL players of each month.

Month	Goaltender	Defense	Forward	Rookie
September	(Russia) Ilya Proskuryakov (Torpedo Nizhny Novgorod)	(Canada) Mat Robinson (Dynamo Moscow)	(Russia) Sergei Mozyakin (Metallurg Magnitogorsk)	(Russia) Vladimir Tkachev (Admiral Vladivostok)
October	(Russia) Igor Shestyorkin (SKA Saint Petersburg)	(Canada) Chris Lee (Metallurg Magnitogorsk)	(Russia) Ilya Kovalchuk (SKA Saint Petersburg)	(Russia) Artyom Zagidulin (Kunlun Red Star)
November	(Russia) Vasily Demchenko (Traktor Chelyabinsk)	(Russia) Zakhar Arzamastsev (Salavat Yulaev Ufa)	(Russia) Sergei Mozyakin (Metallurg Magnitogorsk)	(Russia) Dmitry Shulenin (Torpedo Nizhny Novgorod)
December	(Russia) Alexander Yeryomenko (Dynamo Moscow)	(Russia) Yegor Martynov (Avangard Omsk)	(Sweden) Richard Gynge (Neftekhimik Nizhnekamsk)	(Russia) Vladimir Tkachev (Admiral Vladivostok)
January	(Russia) Alexander Yeryomenko (Dynamo Moscow)	(Finland) Juuso Hietanen (Dynamo Moscow)	(Russia) Sergei Mozyakin (Metallurg Magnitogorsk)	(Russia) Artyom Ilenko (Lokomotiv Yaroslavl)
February	(Russia) Alexander Yeryomenko (Dynamo Moscow)	(Czech Republic) Jakub Nakládal (Lokomotiv Yaroslavl)	(Russia) Sergei Mozyakin (Metallurg Magnitogorsk)	(Russia) Denis Alexeyev (Admiral Vladivostok)
March	(Russia) Vasily Koshechkin (Metallurg Magnitogorsk)	(Russia) Vladislav Gavrikov (Lokomotiv Yaroslavl)	(Russia) Danis Zaripov (Metallurg Magnitogorsk)	(Russia) Grigori Dronov (Metallurg Magnitogorsk)
April				
