= 2025 Kontinental Hockey League All-Star Game =

2025 Fonbet KHL All-Star Game
Game one
- Date: February 8, 2024
- Location: Sibir Arena, Novosibirsk
- Result: Team Bobrov 9 – 6 Team Tarasov

Game two
- Date: February 8, 2024
- Result: Team Chernyshev 10 – 6 Team Kharlamov

Game three
- Date: February 9, 2024
- Result: Team Tarasov 13 – 12 SO Team Kharlamov

Game four
- Date: February 9, 2024
- Result: Team Chernyshev 9 – Team Bobrov 8
- MVP: Trevor Murphy (final); Sergei Lukyantsev (bronze medal game)
- Total attendance: 22,680

Live Broadcast
- Broadcast(s): Match TV; Kinopoisk; KHL TV, KHL Prime; OTV; Belarus 5

The 2025 Kontinental Hockey League All-Star Game took place on February 8-9, 2025 at Sibir Arena in Novosibirsk, Russia, during the 2024–25 KHL season.

== Format ==
The All-Star Game used the format established in 2017, a 3v3 tournament between the four divisions of the KHL: the Bobrov, Tarasov, Kharlamov, and Chernyshev. Each game consisted of 20 minutes of regulation time. If the score was tied, no overtime was played, and the game went into a shootout. The semifinals were held on February 8, and the bronze medal game and the final on February 9. In addition to the games, skills competitions were also held on both of those days.

For the first time, the All-Star Game offered cash prizes: 5 million rubles for the winning team, and 500 thousand rubles each to the most valuable players of the final and the bronze medal game.

== Rosters ==
=== Bobrov Division ===
Nat.	Player	Team	Position
(Russia)	Maxim Dorozhko	HC Vityaz	G
(Russia)	Ivan Bocharov	Torpedo Nizhny Novgorod	G
(Russia)	Bogdan Konyushkov	Torpedo Nizhny Novgorod	D
(Russia)	Alexander Nikishin (C)	SKA Saint-Petersburg	D
(Russia)	Nikolai Goldobin	HC Spartak Moscow	F
(Russia)	Pavel Poryadin	HC Spartak Moscow	F
(Russia)	Ivan Morozov	HC Spartak Moscow	F
(Russia)	Ivan Demidov	SKA Saint-Petersburg	F
(Russia)	Dmitri Buchelnikov	HC Vityaz	F
(Russia)	Timur Khafizov	HC Sochi	F
(Russia)	Yegor Klimovich (Note: Klimovich's Sibir plays in the Chernyshev Division, he was selected to represent the Bobrov from the 2025 MHL All-Star Game.)	HC Sibir Novosibirsk	F
(Russia)	Alexei Zhamnov	HC Spartak Moscow	Coach

Source: KHL

=== Tarasov Division ===
Nat.	Player	Team	Position
(Russia)	Vladislav Podyapolsky	HC Dynamo Moscow	G
(China)	Jeremy Smith	Kunlun Red Star	G
(Slovakia)	Martin Gernat	Lokomotiv Yaroslavl	D
(Russia)	Igor Ozhiganov	HC Dynamo Moscow	D
(Russia)	Danil Aimurzin	Severstal Cherepovets	F
(Russia)	Nikita Gusev	HC Dynamo Moscow	F
(Russia)	Ruslan Iskhakov	HC CSKA Moscow	F
(Russia)	Vladislav Kamenev	HC CSKA Moscow	F
(Russia)	Vadim Shipachev (C)	HC Dynamo Minsk	F
(United States)	Sam Anas	HC Dynamo Minsk	F
(Russia)	Matvei Korotky (Note: Korotky's SKA plays in the Bobrov Division, he was selected to represent the Tarasov from the 2025 MHL All-Star Game.)	SKA Saint-Petersburg	F
(Russia)	Sergei Lukyantsev (Note: Lukyantsev's Spartak plays in the Bobrov Division, he was selected to represent the Tarasov as an emergency invite to replace the injured Matvei Korotky, who recovered in time to participate.)	HC Spartak Moscow	F
(Russia)	Igor Nikitin	Lokomotiv Yaroslavl	Coach

Source: KHL

=== Kharlamov Division ===
Nat.	Player	Team	Position
(Canada)	Zach Fucale	Traktor Chelyabinsk	G
(Russia)	Alexander Trushkov	HC Lada Togliatti	G
(Russia)	Yegor Yakovlev (C)	Metallurg Magnitogorsk	D
(Russia)	Nikita Lyamkin	Ak Bars Kazan	D
(Russia)	Maxim Shabanov	Amur Khabarovsk	F
(France)	Stephane Da Costa	Avtomobilist Yekaterinburg	F
(Russia)	Alexander Kadeikin	Traktor Chelyabinsk	F
(Russia)	Dmitri Silantyev	Metallurg Magnitogorsk	F
(Czech Republic)	Dmitri Jaskin	Ak Bars Kazan	F
(Russia)	Andrei Belozyorov	HC Neftekhimik Nizhnekamsk	F
(Russia)	Yaromir Ermakov (Note: As of the 2025 All-Star Game, Yaromir has not made a KHL debut, he was selected to represent the Kharlamov from the 2025 MHL All-Star Game.)	Akademiya Mikhailova	F
(Canada)	Benoit Groulx	Traktor Chelyabinsk	Coach

Source: KHL

=== Chernyshev Division ===
Nat.	Player	Team	Position
(Kazakhstan)	Nikita Boyarkin	Barys Astana	G
(Russia)	Denis Kostin	HC Sibir Novosibirsk	G
(Canada)	Trevor Murphy	HC Sibir Novosibirsk	D
(Russia)	Semyon Chistyakov	Avangard Omsk	D
(Russia)	Damir Sharipzyanov (Note: Emergency invite to replace the injured Joshua Leivo.)	Avangard Omsk	D
(United States)	Alex Galchenyuk	Amur Khabarovsk	F
(Russia)	Daniil Gutik	Admiral Vladivostok	F
(United States)	Alexander Chmelevski	Salavat Yulaev Ufa	F
(Russia)	Sergei Shirokov (C)	HC Sibir Novosibirsk	F
(Russia)	Nail Yakupov	Avangard Omsk	F
(Russia)	Maxim Filimonov (Note: As of the 2025 All-Star Game, Filimonov has not made a KHL debut, he was selected to represent the Chernyshev from the 2025 MHL All-Star Game.)	JHC Atlant	F
(Russia)	Viktor Kozlov	Salavat Yulaev Ufa	Coach

Source: KHL

=== Invited but could not participate ===
Nat.	Player	Team	Position	Reason
(Russia)	Daniil Isayev	Lokomotiv Yaroslavl	G	Injury
(United States)	Tony DeAngelo	SKA Saint-Petersburg	D	Left KHL's SKA to join NHL's NYI
(Russia)	Evgeny Kuznetsov	SKA Saint-Petersburg	F	Injury
(Canada)	Reid Boucher	Avangard Omsk	F	Injury
(Canada)	Joshua Leivo	Salavat Yulaev Ufa	F	Injury

== Game summaries ==
=== Semifinals ===
February 8, 2025	Bobrov Division	9–6 (5–6, 4–0)	Tarasov Division	Sibir Arena, Novosibirsk, Russia

Game reference
28	Shots	24

February 8, 2025	Chernyshev Division	10–6 (5–3, 5–3)	Kharlamov Division	Sibir Arena, Novosibirsk, Russia

Game reference
35	Shots	23

=== Bronze medal game ===
February 9, 2025	Kharlamov Division	12–13 SO (6–5, 6–7, 0–1)	Tarasov Division	Sibir Arena, Novosibirsk, Russia

Game reference
24	Shots	31

=== Final ===
February 9, 2025	Chernyshev Division	9–8 (3–3, 6–5)	Bobrov Division	Sibir Arena, Novosibirsk, Russia

Game reference
31	Shots	27
