= Boykov =

Boykov or Boikov (Cyrillic: Бойков) is a Russian and Bulgarian masculine surname originating from the root boi, meaning fight or its adjectives like boikii (bold, quick); its feminine counterpart is Boykova or Boikova. Notable people with the surname include:

- Alexandre Boikov (born 1975), Russian ice hockey defenseman
- Alexander Boikov (born 1975), Russian ice hockey forward
- Aleksandra Boikova (born 2002), Russian pair skater
- Nikolay Boykov (born 1968), Bulgarian writer
- Sergei Boikov (born 1996), Russian ice hockey defenceman
- Viktoria Boykova (born 1989), Russian wheelchair fencer
- Vladimir Boykov (born 1976), Russian footballer
