= Stepan Sannikov =

Russian ice hockey player

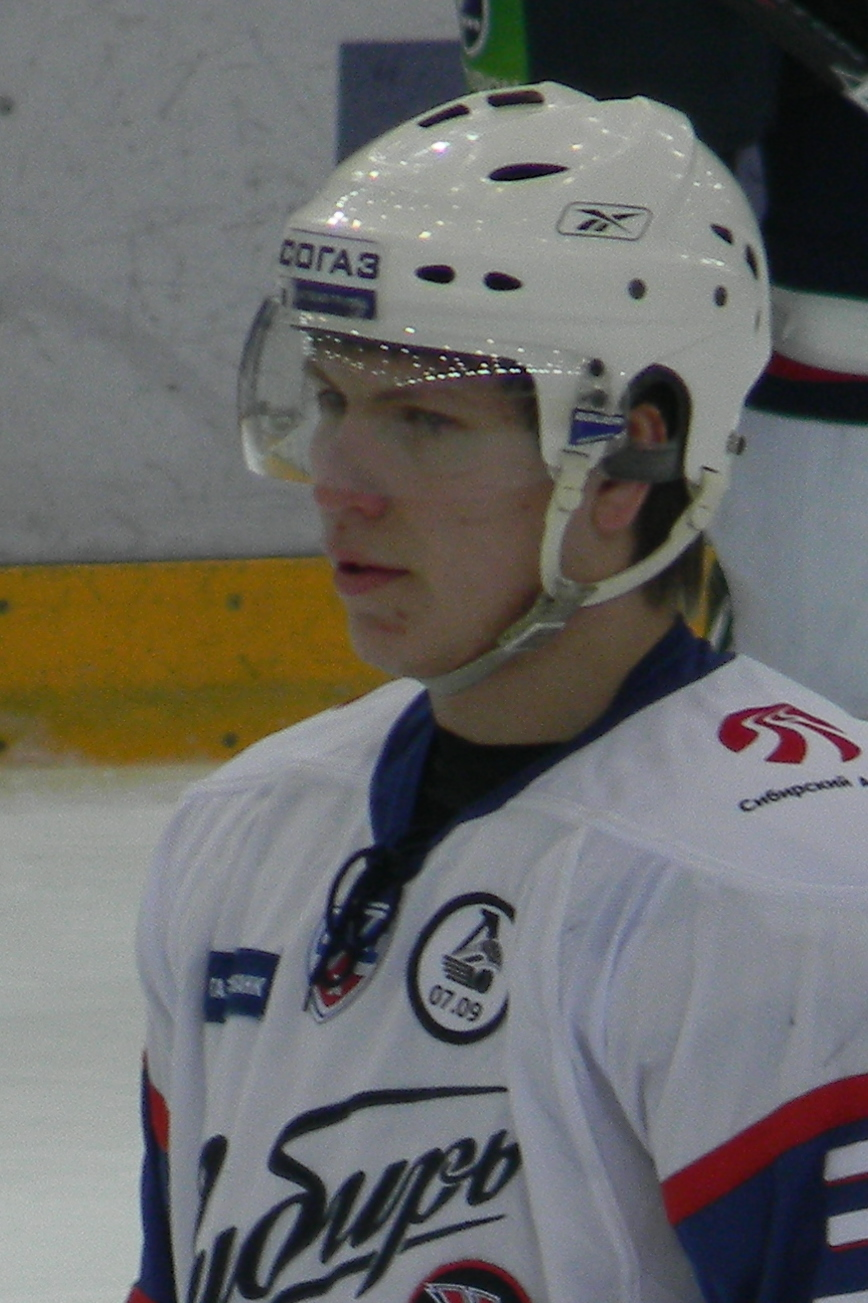
- Born: September 25, 1990 (age 36) Solikamsk, Russian SFSR, Soviet Union
- Height: 6 ft 0.5 in (184 cm)
- Weight: 204 lb (93 kg; 14 st 8 lb)
- Position: Left wing
- Shoots: Left
- Pro Hokei Ligasy team: Arlan Kokshetau
- Played for: Sibirskie Snaipery; Sibir Novosibirsk; Zauralie Kurgan; Ryazan; Lokomotiv Yaroslavl; Ak Bars Kazan; Salavat Yulaev Ufa; Dinamo Saint Petersburg; Tambov; Brest
- National team: Russia
- Playing career: 2007–present

Medal record

Representing Russia

Ice hockey

World Championships
Bronze medal – third place	2016 Russia	

Stepan Romanovich Sannikov (Russian: Степа́н Рома́нович Са́нников; born September 25, 1990, in Solikamsk) is a Russian professional ice hockey forward. He is currently playing under contract with Arlan Kokshetau of the Pro Hokei Ligasy. He previously played for Salavat Yulaev Ufa, Ak Bars Kazan, Lokomotiv Yaroslavl of the Kontinental Hockey League (KHL). He initially spent the first 11 years of his professional career within HC Sibir Novosibirsk.
