= Konstantin Alexeyev =

Russian ice hockey player

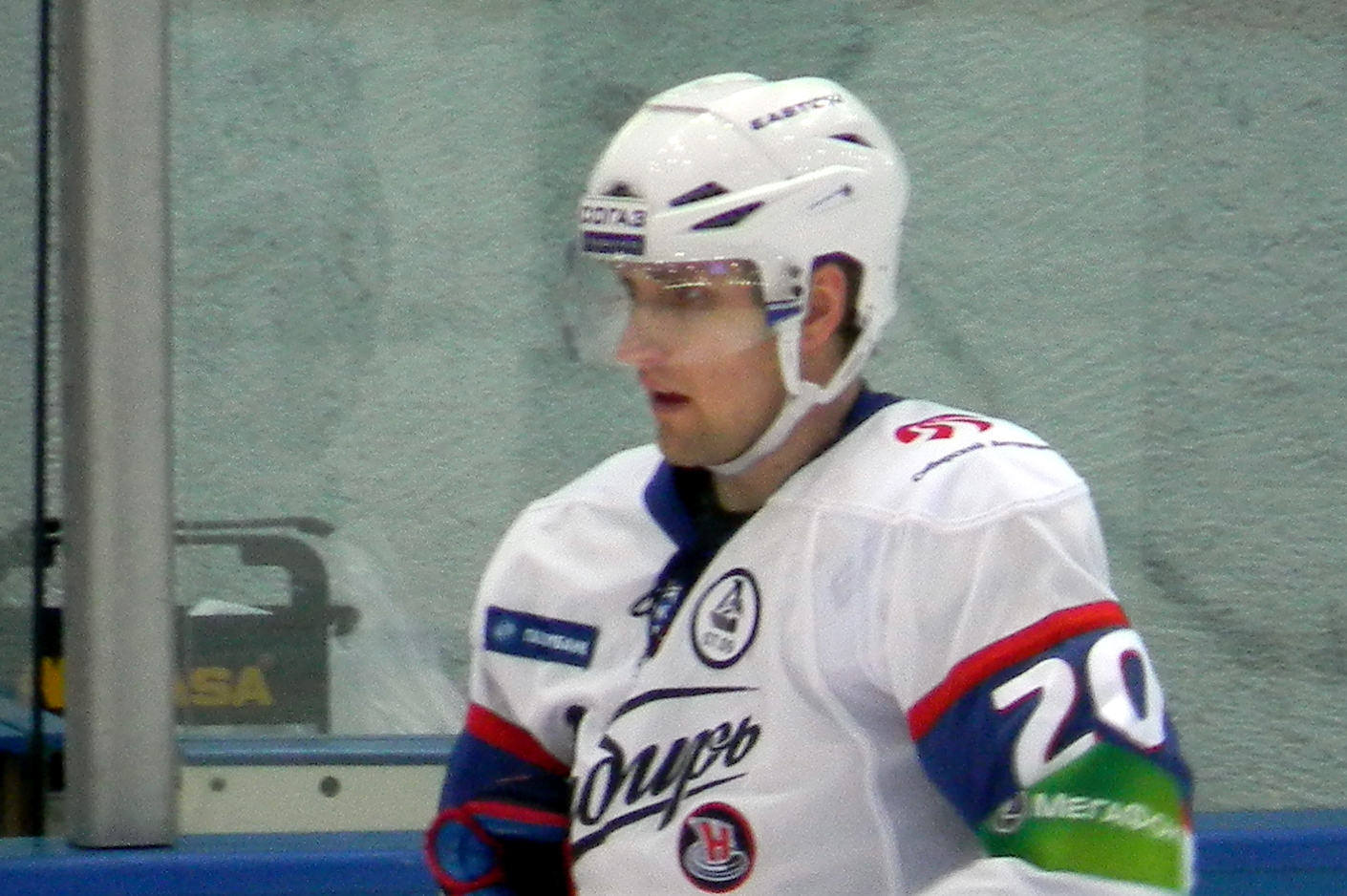
- Born: February 26, 1988 (age 38) Novosibirsk, Russia
- Height: 6 ft 0 in (183 cm)
- Weight: 183 lb (83 kg; 13 st 1 lb)
- Position: Defence
- Shot: Left
- Played for: Sibirskie Snaipery; Sibir Novosibirsk; Energia Kemerovo; Zauralie Kurgan; CSKA Moscow
- Playing career: 2006–2022

Konstantin Sergeevich Alexeyev (Russian: Константин Сергеевич Алексеев) (born February 26, 1988) is a Russian former professional ice hockey defenceman. He most recently played for HC Sibir Novosibirsk of the Kontinental Hockey League (KHL).

== Playing career ==
Alexeyev made his Kontinental Hockey League debut playing with HC Sibir Novosibirsk during the inaugural 2008–09 KHL season. After spending the first 11 years of his professional career with Siberia, Alexeyev left as a free agent to sign a two-year deal to continue in the KHL with HC CSKA Moscow on May 1, 2016. In the 2016–17 season, after just 16 games with CSKA, Alexeyev was traded back to original club, Sibir Novosibirsk, on December 9, 2016.
