= Enlund =

Enlund is a Swedish-language surname.

== Geographical distribution ==
As of 2014, 44.9% of all known bearers of the surname Enlund were residents of Sweden (frequency 1:16,384), 34.7% of Finland (1:11,847) and 16.2% of the United States (1:1,664,752).

In Sweden, the frequency of the surname was higher than national average (1:16,384) in the following counties:

1. Uppsala County (1:4,020)
2. Västmanland County (1:5,404)
3. Norrbotten County (1:7,838)
4. Dalarna County (1:8,480)
5. Jönköping County (1:9,051)
6. Östergötland County (1:12,870)
7. Södermanland County (1:13,296)
8. Stockholm County (1:14,200)

In Finland, the frequency of the surname was higher than national average (1:11,847) in the following regions:

1. Ostrobothnia (1:801)
2. Central Ostrobothnia (1:1,153)
3. Åland (1:2,153)
4. Päijänne Tavastia (1:10,260)

== People ==
- Jonas Enlund (born 1987), Finnish professional ice hockey winger
