= Evgeny Lapin =

Russian ice hockey player

- Born: 8 May 1980 (age 44); Lipetsk, Russian SFSR
- Height: 5 ft 8 in (173 cm)
- Weight: 168 lb (76 kg; 12 st 0 lb)
- Position: Forward
- Shot: Left
- Played for: Torpedo Yaroslavl; Metallurg Novokuznetsk; Dynamo Moscow; CSKA Moscow; SKA Saint Petersburg; Sibir Novosibirsk; HK MVD
- Playing career: 1996–2012

Evgeny Lapin (born May 8, 1980) is a Russian former professional ice hockey forward who played in the Kontinental Hockey League (KHL). He last played in for HC Sibir Novosibirsk in the KHL before completing his career in the Supreme Hockey League with Buran Voronezh
