= Vladimir Tarasenko =

Russian ice hockey player (born 1991)

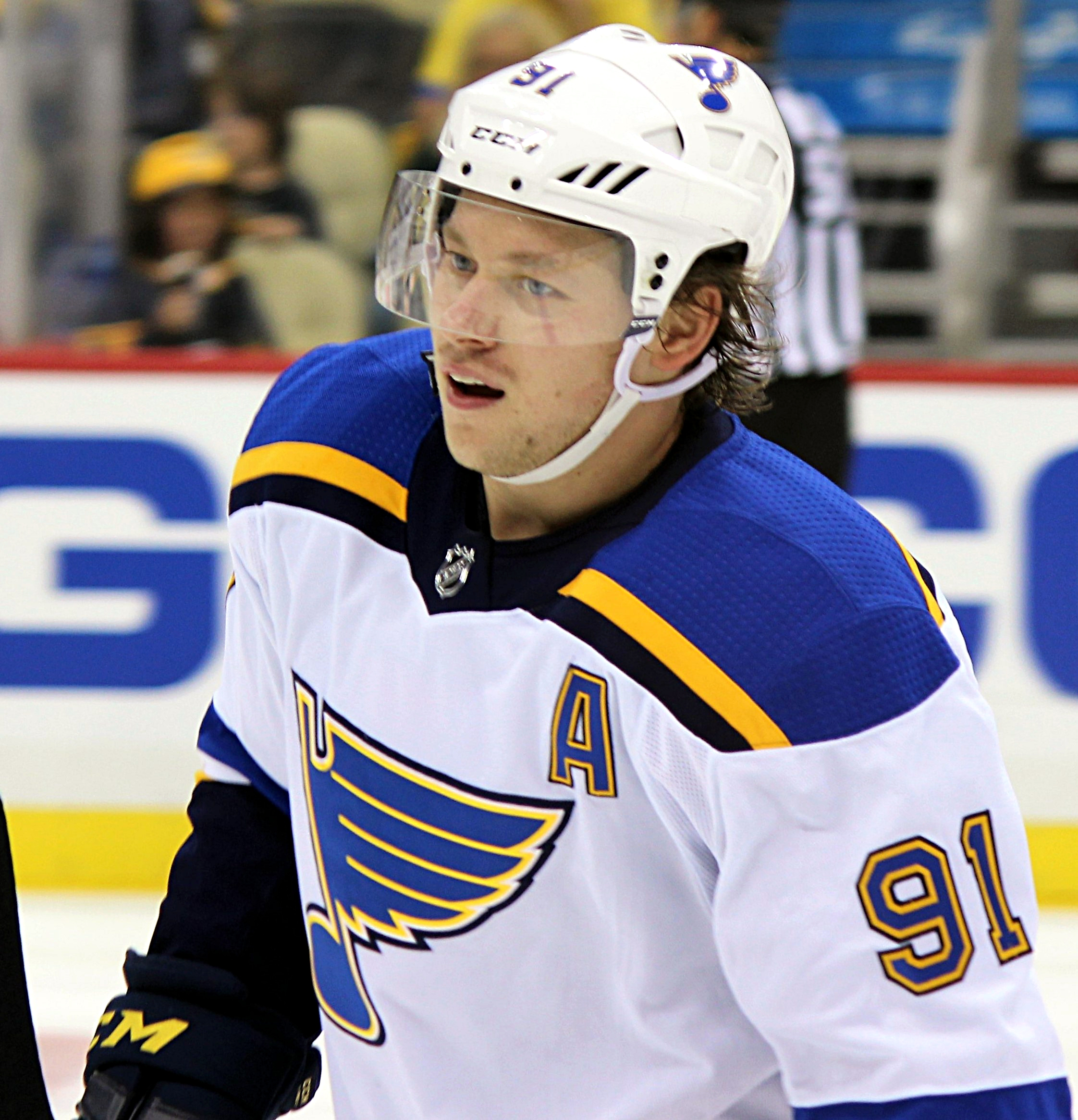
- Tarasenko with the St. Louis Blues in October 2017
- Born: 13 December 1991 (age 34) Yaroslavl, Russian SFSR, Soviet Union
- Height: 6 ft 1 in (185 cm)
- Weight: 219 lb (99 kg; 15 st 9 lb)
- Position: Right wing
- Shoots: Left
- NHL team Former teams: Free agent Sibir Novosibirsk; SKA Saint Petersburg; St. Louis Blues; New York Rangers; Ottawa Senators; Florida Panthers; Detroit Red Wings; Minnesota Wild
- National team: Russia
- NHL draft: 16th overall, 2010; St. Louis Blues
- Playing career: 2010–present

Vladimir Andreyevich Tarasenko (Russian: Влади́мир Андре́евич Тарасе́нко; born 13 December 1991) is a Russian professional ice hockey player who is a right winger. He most recently played for the Minnesota Wild of the National Hockey League (NHL).

Prior to playing in the NHL, he played in the system of Sibir Novosibirsk organization, first playing for the senior team in the Kontinental Hockey League (KHL) in 2008–09. He spent a total of three seasons with Novosibirsk before being traded to SKA Saint Petersburg in 2012. Tarasenko was selected in the first round, 16th overall, in the 2010 NHL entry draft by the St. Louis Blues, joining the team for the 2012–13 season.

He spent parts of 11 seasons in St. Louis, becoming one of the franchise's leading scorers, playing in three NHL All-Star Games, and winning the Stanley Cup in 2019. Tarasenko was then traded to the New York Rangers in February 2023 and later played for the Ottawa Senators before a trade to the Florida Panthers. With the Panthers, Tarasenko won a second Stanley Cup in 2024. He has also played for the Detroit Red Wings.

== Playing career ==
=== Russia ===
Tarasenko made his professional debut with Sibir Novosibirsk of the Kontinental Hockey League (KHL) in 2008–09, scoring seven goals and ten points in 38 games and was the runner up in voting for Rookie of the Year in the KHL's inaugural season. He was released to play with the Russian junior team at the 2009 IIHF World U18 Championships, where he scored eight goals in seven games and was named a tournament all-star as Russia won silver. Tarasenko returned to Sibir in 2009–10 as the seventh-youngest player in the League. He again represented Russia at the 2010 World Junior Ice Hockey Championships, finishing third in team scoring with five points in six games.

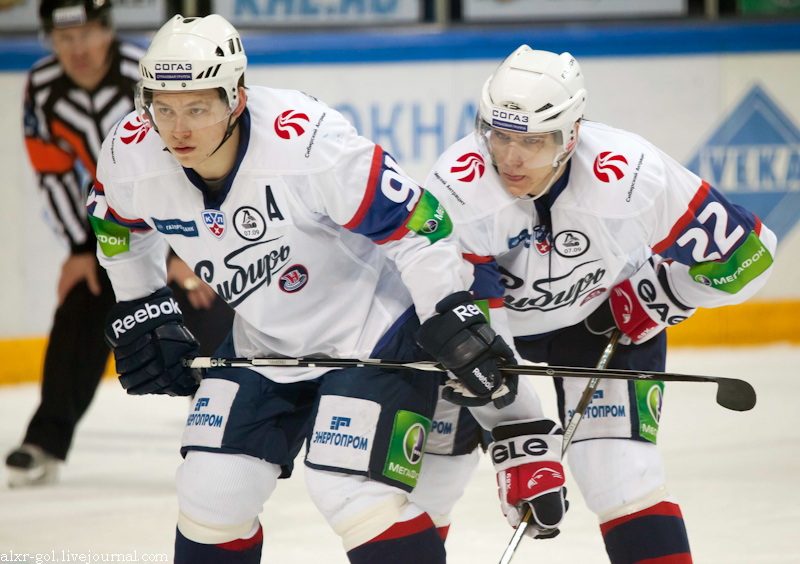
Tarasenko (left foreground) with HC Sibir, December 2011

International Scouting Services (ISS) ranked Tarasenko as the top-ranked European skater, and fourth overall, in its mid-term rankings ahead of the 2010 NHL entry draft. Described by scouts as strong and mobile with no glaring weaknesses, Tarasenko had expressed interest in playing in the NHL, though his father, also his coach with Sibir, believed it was important that his son remain in Russia. Tarasenko was ultimately drafted by St. Louis Blues of the National Hockey League (NHL) in the first round, 16th overall, at the 2010 draft with the pick obtained via a trade from the Ottawa Senators St. Louis had acquired in exchange for David Rundblad.

On 13 January 2012, Tarasenko was traded to SKA Saint Petersburg in exchange for Vyacheslav Solodukhin. On 2 June 2012, Tarasenko announced that he would be moving to North America to play in the NHL for the St. Louis Blues rather than staying and playing in the KHL. As a result of the 2012–13 NHL lockout that cancelled a large part of the NHL regular season, however, Tarasenko instead returned to SKA to begin 2012–13. He credited the decision in part to a desire to play with Ilya Kovalchuk, the captain of the team who also joined as a result of the lockout.

=== St. Louis Blues (2012–2023) ===
Once the lockout ended, Tarasenko began the shortened, 48-game 2012–13 season with the Blues. He scored his first and second career NHL goals on the first two shots of his league debut on 19 January 2013, against Jimmy Howard of the Detroit Red Wings in a 6–0 win. On 4 February, Tarasenko was named the NHL's Rookie of the Month for January after scoring five goals and four assists (nine points). He ultimately finished his first NHL season with eight goals and 11 assists in 38 games.

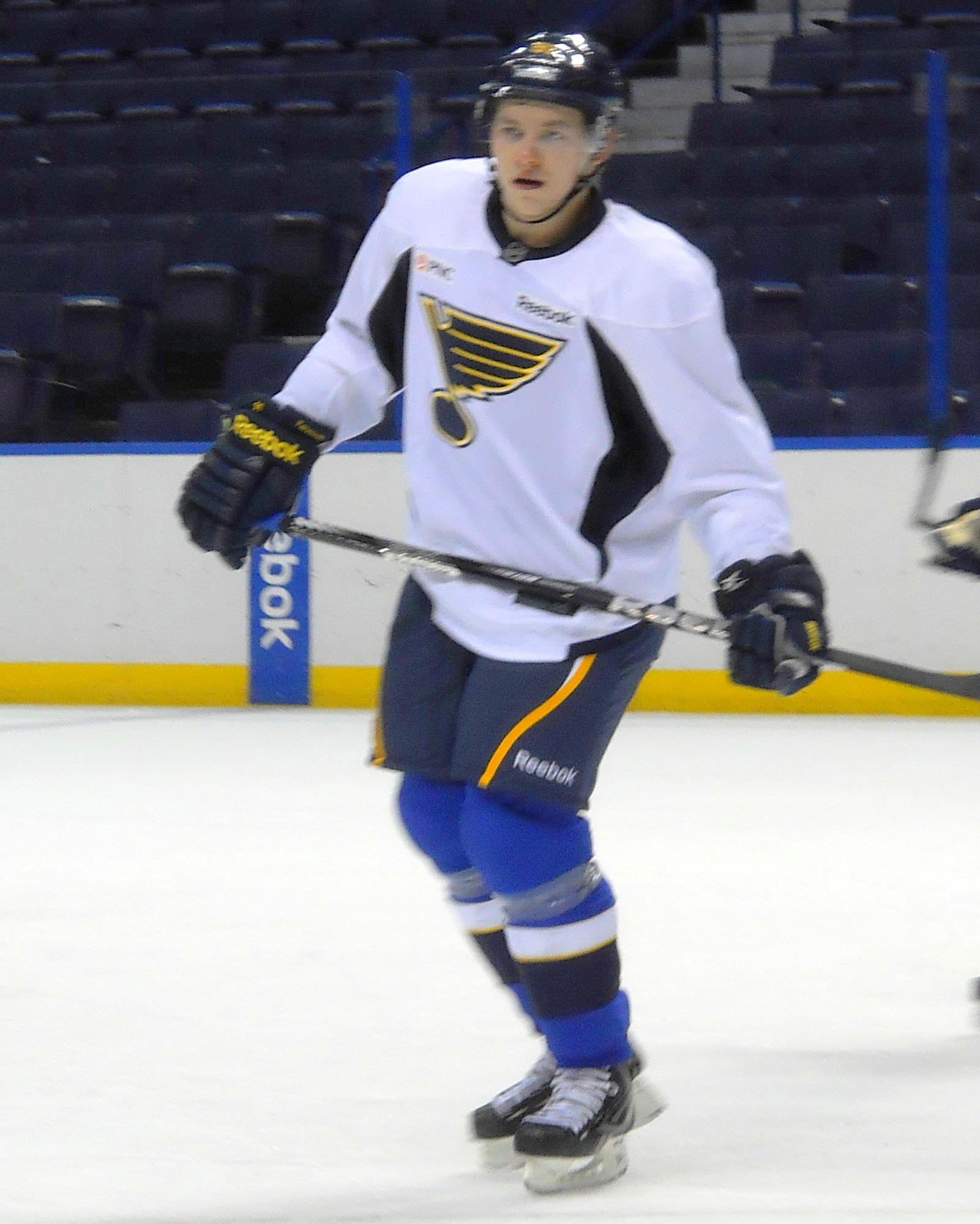
Tarasenko during team practice with the St. Louis Blues, January 2013

On 19 March 2014, towards the conclusion of the 2013–14 season, Tarasenko underwent successful surgery to repair a hand injury sustained in a 4–1 Blues win over the Nashville Predators. He was expected to miss the remainder of the regular season, but made a quick recovery, returning to play in the 2014 Stanley Cup playoffs where he scored four goals in the series against the Chicago Blackhawks.

On 28 October 2014, during the 2014–15 season, Tarasenko recorded his first career NHL hat-trick against Kari Lehtonen of the Dallas Stars and was later named the NHL's First Star of the Week after scoring five goals and one assist during the week. Tarasenko finished the regular season leading the Blues in both goals (37) and points (73), also finishing fifth in the league in goals and ninth in total points. On 18 April 2015, Tarasenko scored his first career Stanley Cup playoff hat-trick against Devan Dubnyk of the Minnesota Wild in game two of St. Louis' Western Conference Quarterfinals matchup. In the series, he scored six goals and one assist (seven points), though the Blues ultimately fell to the Wild in six games. On 7 July 2015, during the subsequent off-season, Tarasenko, as a restricted free agent, signed an eight-year, $60 million contract with St. Louis at an annual average value of $7.5 million. Tarasenko is known for his very accurate and unique wrist shot, which has earned him a reputation as one of the most dangerous goal scorers in the NHL. He was one of only two players to score at least 30 goals in a five-season stretch from 2014–15 through 2018–19, along with fellow-Russian Alexander Ovechkin of the Washington Capitals.

Tarasenko won the Stanley Cup with the Blues in 2019, St. Louis' first Stanley Cup in their 52-year franchise history. During the Blues' 2019 playoff run, Tarasenko recorded 11 goals, the second-highest total among Blues players and the third-highest among all players in the playoffs. In game five of the 2019 Western Conference Final against the San Jose Sharks, Tarasenko became the first player in Blues playoff history to score a goal on a penalty shot.

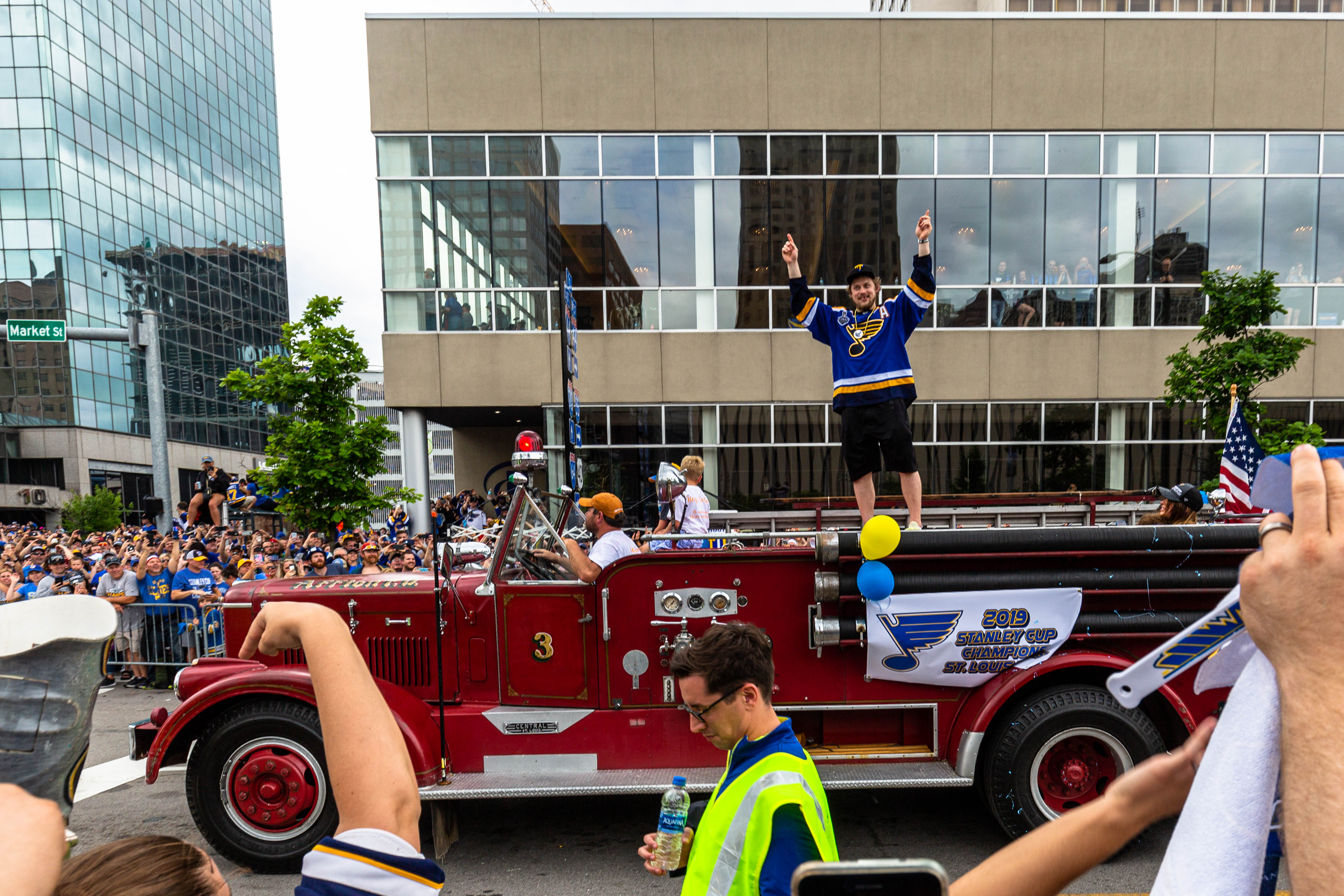
Tarasenko at the St. Louis Blues' championship parade after the 2019 Stanley Cup Final

On 24 October 2019, during a 5–2 win over the Los Angeles Kings, Tarasenko was forced to leave the game after getting tangled up with Kings defenceman Sean Walker. Four days later, it was announced that Tarasenko would require shoulder surgery and be sidelined at least five months. This was the second of three shoulder surgeries Tarasenko would undergo in a span of less than three years due to lingering instability, the first after an April 2018 injury and the third following an early departure from the team in the 2020 postseason.

On 7 July 2021, it was reported that Tarasenko had requested a trade from St. Louis due to him being unhappy with how the club had handled his shoulder surgeries. He was left unprotected in the 2021 NHL expansion draft, but was not selected.

Despite tensions between the Blues and Tarasenko, a trade could not be made to honor his request to be moved. The two sides ultimately put the situation behind them and Tarasenko remained with St. Louis for the 2021–22 season. Tarasenko went on to have the most productive year of his career to that point, scoring 34 goals and setting career highs in assists (48) and points (82), averaging more than a point per game. He helped the Blues advance to the second round of the 2022 NHL playoffs, tallying nine points and six goals in 12 playoff games, including his second career playoff hat trick in game five of the Blues' first round series against the Minnesota Wild. During the playoffs, he also scored his 40th career postseason goal, becoming the second player in franchise history besides Brett Hull to reach that mark.

=== New York Rangers (2023) ===
Tarasenko, alongside defenceman Niko Mikkola, was traded to the New York Rangers on 9 February 2023. In his Rangers debut a day later against the Seattle Kraken, Tarasenko scored his first goal with his new team in only 2:49 in the first period, which was the fourth fastest goal in Rangers debut in franchise history, behind Norman Lowe (1:00 in 1950), Lane Lambert (2:28 in 1986), and Mike Allison (2:44 in 1980). He scored eight goals and 21 points in 31 games with the Rangers while going unpenalized. He added three goals and four points in seven playoff games.

=== Ottawa Senators (2023–2024) ===
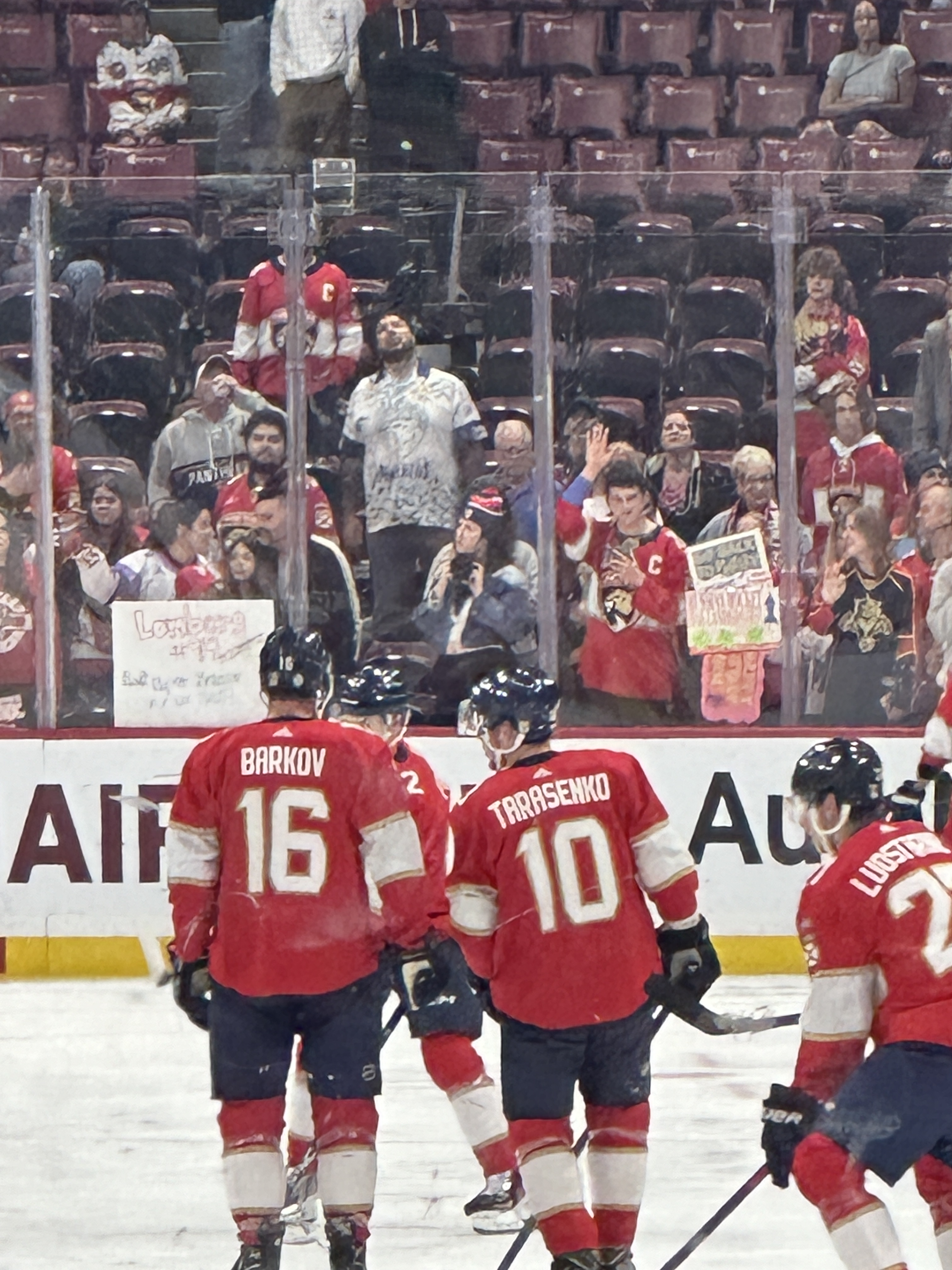
Tarasenko (right) with Aleksander Barkov during a game in March 2024. Tarasenko would go on to win his second career Stanley Cup title later that season.

Having left the Rangers as an unrestricted free agent, on 27 July 2023, Tarasenko signed a one-year, $5 million contract with the Ottawa Senators. Tarasenko joined the Senators with the intention of getting them to the playoffs. He made his debut with Ottawa in the season opener versus the Carolina Hurricanes on 11 October 2023. Tarasenko scored his first goal in a Senators uniform on 15 October against Matt Tomkins in a 5–2 win over the Tampa Bay Lightning. On 5 December, Tarasenko scored twice and assisted on another in a 6–2 win over his former team, the New York Rangers. On 12 January 2024, Tarasenko registered his 600th career point when he scored on Ukko-Pekka Luukkonen in a 5–3 loss to the Buffalo Sabres. However, the Senators were not in a playoff position near the trade deadline. Tarasenko had been given a no-movement clause in his contract by former general manager Pierre Dorion, the new general manager Steve Staios asked him to waive it in order to trade him.

=== Florida Panthers (2024) ===
On 6 March 2024, the Senators traded Tarasenko to the Florida Panthers in exchange for a conditional 2024 fourth-round and a 2025 third-round pick. He made his Panthers debut on 7 March against the Philadelphia Flyers. He scored his first two goals as a Panther on 9 March on Jacob Markström in a 5–1 win over the Calgary Flames. He finished the 2023–24 season with six goals and eight assists in 19 regular season games and five goals and four assists in 24 playoff games. On 24 June, Tarasenko won his second Stanley Cup after the Panthers beat the Edmonton Oilers 2–1 in game seven of the 2024 Stanley Cup Final.

=== Detroit Red Wings (2024–2025) ===
An unrestricted free agent at season's end, on 3 July 2024, Tarasenko signed a two-year, $9.5 million contract with the Detroit Red Wings.

=== Minnesota Wild (2025–2026) ===
After just one season in Detroit where Tarasenko underperformed relative to his contract expectations, he was traded to the Minnesota Wild on 30 June 2025, in exchange for future considerations. Tarasenko's contract was not renewed at the end of the 2025–26 season and he became an unrestricted free agent.

== International play ==
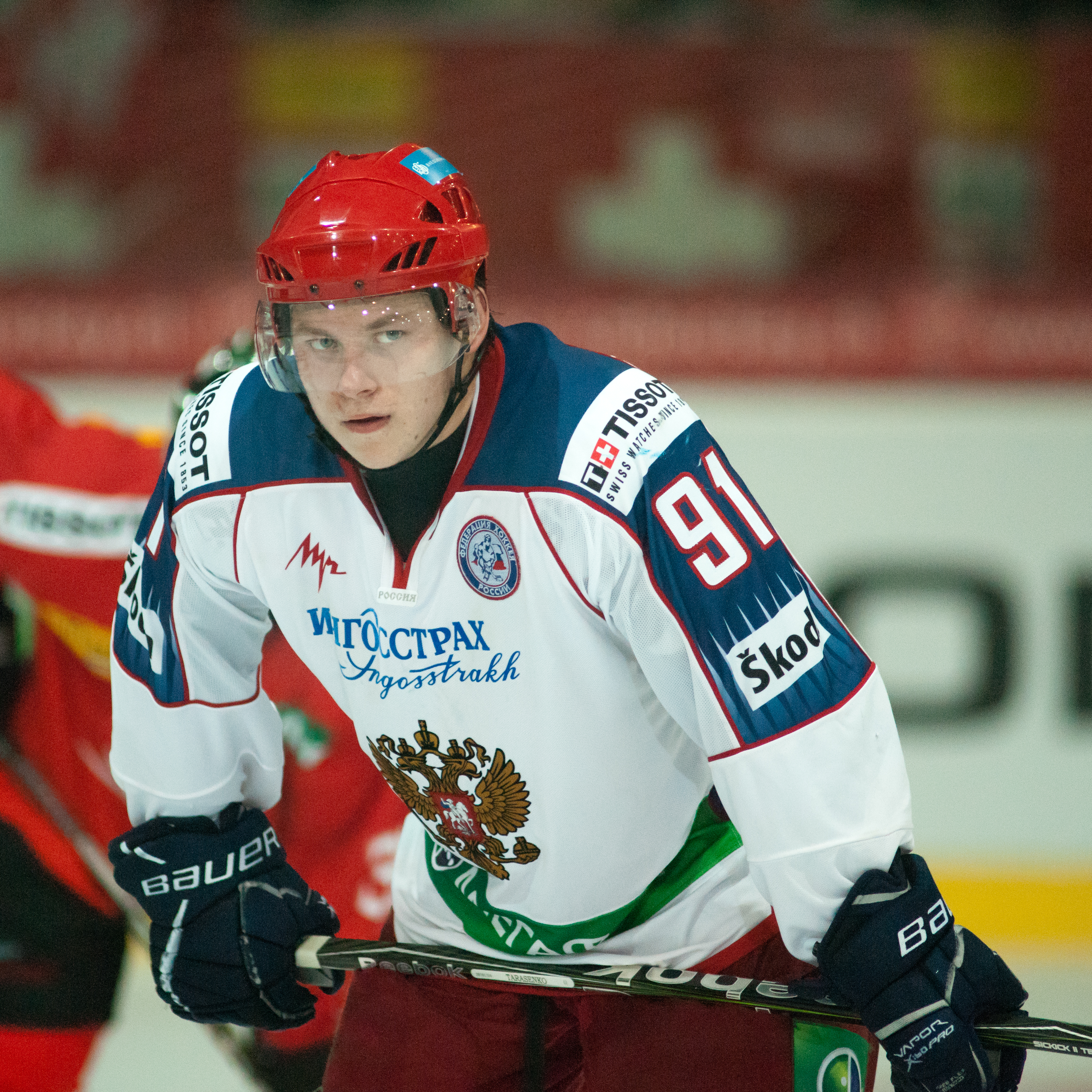
- Tarasenko with the Russian men's national ice hockey team in April 2011

Medal record

Men's ice hockey

Representing Russia

World Championships
Silver medal – second place	2015 Czech Republic	

World Junior Championships
Gold medal – first place	2011 United States	

IIHF World U18 Championship
Silver medal – second place	2009 United States	

Internationally, Tarasenko has played for the Russian junior team three times, winning a silver medal at the 2009 IIHF World U18 Championships, sixth place at the 2010 World Junior Ice Hockey Championships and captained Russia to a gold medal at the 2011 World Junior Ice Hockey Championships. At the senior level, Tarasenko has also played for Russia at the 2011 IIHF World Championship and was a member of the Russian national team for the 2014 Winter Olympics held in his native Russia, in Sochi. He represented Russia at the 2015 IIHF World Championship, winning a silver medal, the 2016 World Cup of Hockey, and 2021 IIHF World Championship.

== Personal life ==
Tarasenko's father, Andrei, was a former Russian league scoring champion and Olympian who competed at the 1994 Winter Olympics.

Tarasenko and his wife were married on 1 July 2015. The couple has two sons. Tarasenko's wife has a son from previous marriage.

Tarasenko was the cover athlete for EA Sports' NHL 17.

== Career statistics ==
=== Regular season and playoffs ===
			Regular season					Playoffs
Season	Team	League	GP	G	A	Pts	PIM	GP	G	A	Pts	PIM
2007–08	Sibir–2 Novosibirsk	RUS.3	17	6	4	10	2	—	—	—	—	—
2008–09	Sibir Novosibirsk	KHL	38	7	3	10	2	—	—	—	—	—
2009–10	Sibirskie Snaipery Novosibirsk	MHL	1	1	0	1	0	—	—	—	—	—
2009–10	Sibir Novosibirsk	KHL	42	13	11	24	18	—	—	—	—	—
2010–11	Sibir Novosibirsk	KHL	42	9	10	19	8	3	0	0	0	0
2010–11	Sibirskie Snaipery Novosibirsk	MHL	3	2	2	4	2	—	—	—	—	—
2011–12	Sibir Novosibirsk	KHL	39	18	20	38	15	—	—	—	—	—
2011–12	SKA Saint Petersburg	KHL	15	5	4	9	0	15	10	6	16	6
2012–13	SKA Saint Petersburg	KHL	31	14	17	31	8	—	—	—	—	—
2012–13	St. Louis Blues	NHL	38	8	11	19	10	1	0	0	0	0
2013–14	St. Louis Blues	NHL	64	21	22	43	16	6	4	0	4	0
2014–15	St. Louis Blues	NHL	77	37	36	73	31	6	6	1	7	0
2015–16	St. Louis Blues	NHL	80	40	34	74	37	20	9	6	15	2
2016–17	St. Louis Blues	NHL	82	39	36	75	12	11	3	3	6	0
2017–18	St. Louis Blues	NHL	80	33	33	66	17	—	—	—	—	—
2018–19	St. Louis Blues	NHL	76	33	35	68	22	26	11	6	17	4
2019–20	St. Louis Blues	NHL	10	3	7	10	0	4	0	0	0	0
2020–21	St. Louis Blues	NHL	24	4	10	14	0	4	2	0	2	0
2021–22	St. Louis Blues	NHL	75	34	48	82	32	12	6	3	9	0
2022–23	St. Louis Blues	NHL	38	10	19	29	8	—	—	—	—	—
2022–23	New York Rangers	NHL	31	8	13	21	0	7	3	1	4	2
2023–24	Ottawa Senators	NHL	57	17	24	41	12	—	—	—	—	—
2023–24	Florida Panthers	NHL	19	6	8	14	0	24	5	4	9	2
2024–25	Detroit Red Wings	NHL	80	11	22	33	6	—	—	—	—	—
2025–26	Minnesota Wild	NHL	75	23	24	47	10	11	2	3	5	2
KHL totals			207	66	65	131	51	18	10	6	16	6
NHL totals			906	327	382	709	213	132	51	27	78	12

=== International ===
Year	Team	Event	Result	GP	G	A	Pts	PIM
2008	Russia	IH18	2nd place, silver medalist(s)	4	3	2	5	0
2009	Russia	U18	2nd place, silver medalist(s)	8	8	7	15	6
2010	Russia	WJC	6th	6	4	1	5	2
2011	Russia	WJC	1st place, gold medalist(s)	7	4	7	11	0
2011	Russia	WC	4th	6	1	0	1	0
2014	Russia	OG	5th	5	0	1	1	0
2015	Russia	WC	2nd place, silver medalist(s)	9	4	3	7	2
2016	Russia	WCH	4th	4	2	0	2	0
2021	ROC	WC	5th	3	0	2	2	2
Junior totals				24	19	17	36	8
Senior totals				27	7	6	13	4

== Awards and honors ==
Award	Year	Ref
NHL
Rookie of the Month (January)	2013	
All-Star Game	2015, 2016, 2017, 2023	
Second All-Star team	2015, 2016	
EA Sports NHL cover athlete	2017	
Stanley Cup champion	2019, 2024	
International
World U18 Championships – First Team All-Star	2009	

Awards and achievements
Preceded by Jaden Schwartz	St. Louis Blues first-round draft pick 2010	Succeeded by Jordan Schmaltz
