= Taylor Beck (ice hockey) =

Canadian ice hockey player (born 1991)

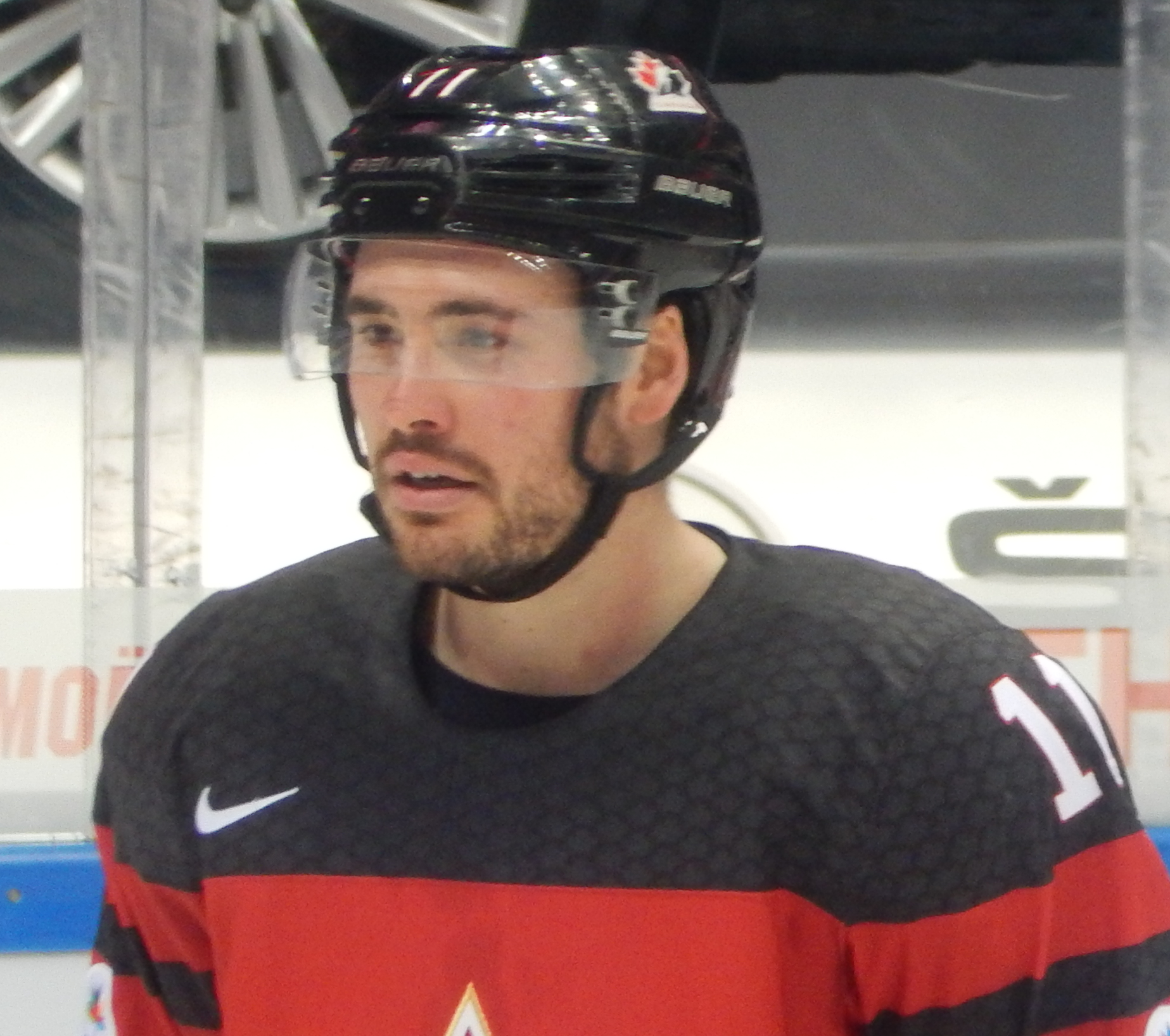
- Beck with Team Canada during the 2017 Channel One Cup
- Born: May 13, 1991 (age 35) St. Catharines, Ontario, Canada
- Height: 6 ft 2 in (188 cm)
- Weight: 218 lb (99 kg; 15 st 8 lb)
- Position: Right wing
- Shoots: Right
- team Former teams: Free agent Nashville Predators; New York Islanders; Edmonton Oilers; New York Rangers; Avtomobilist Yekaterinburg; Kunlun Red Star; Avangard Omsk; Metallurg Magnitogorsk; Dinamo Minsk; Sibir Novosibirsk; Genève-Servette HC
- NHL draft: 70th overall, 2009; Nashville Predators
- Playing career: 2011–present

Taylor Beck (born May 13, 1991) is a Canadian professional ice hockey player. Previously, Beck had played in the National Hockey League (NHL) with the New York Rangers, Edmonton Oilers, New York Islanders, and Nashville Predators organizations, with the latter having originally drafted him in 2009.

== Playing career ==
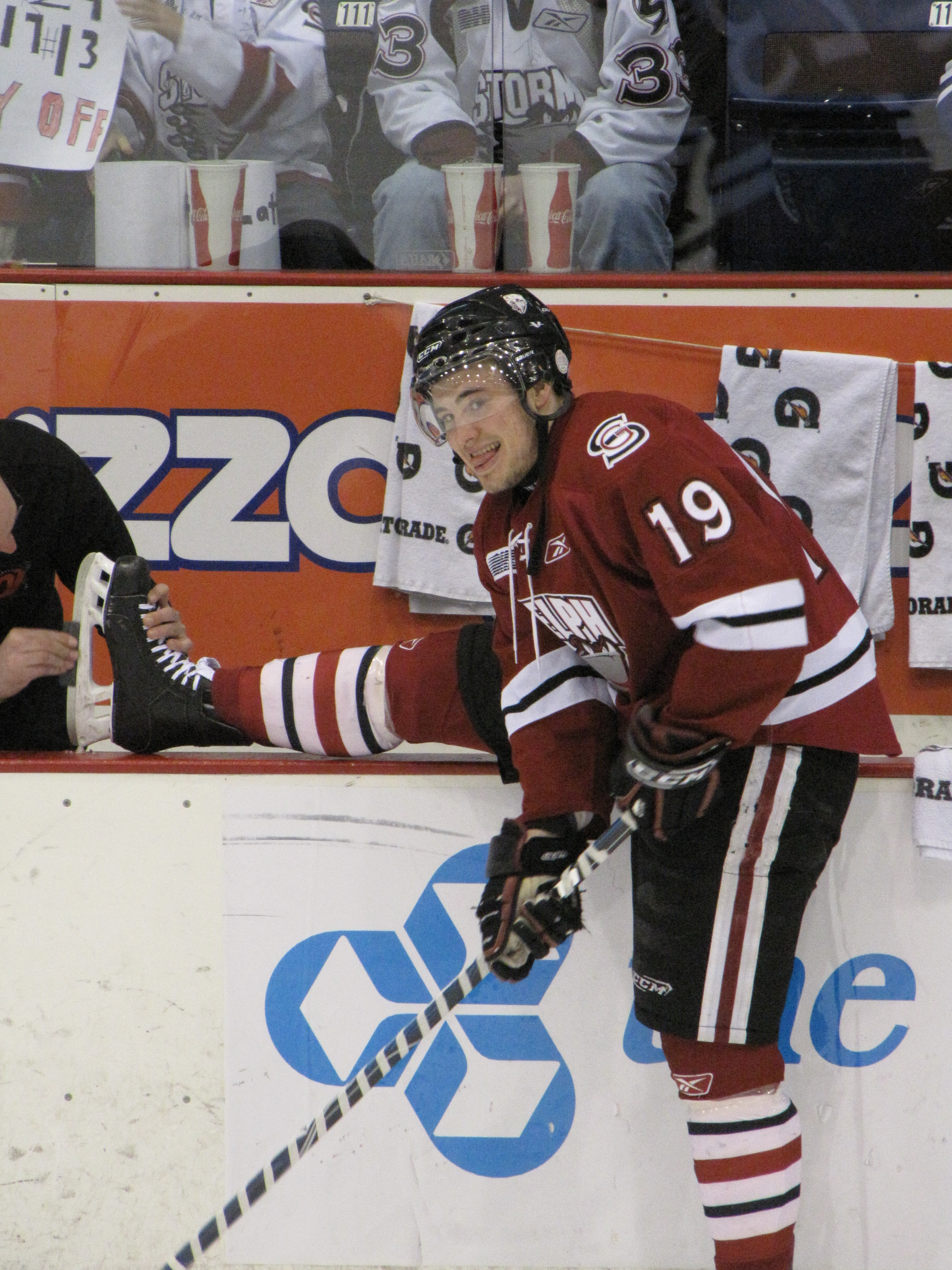
Beck as a member of the Guelph Storm in 2010

Beck was drafted by the Nashville Predators in the third round, 70th overall, in the 2009 NHL entry draft. He was signed to a three-year entry-level contract with the Predators on August 25, 2010.

During the lock-out shortened 2012–13 season, Beck received his first recall from the Milwaukee Admirals and made his NHL debut with the Predators in a 4–3 defeat to the Columbus Blue Jackets on March 19, 2013. In his third game with Nashville, also against the Blue Jackets, Beck scored his first NHL goal in a multi-point game victory on March 23, 2013.

Following the 2014–15 NHL season Beck became a restricted free agent under the NHL Collective Bargaining Agreement. The Nashville Predators made him a qualifying offer to retain his NHL rights and, on July 5, 2015, Beck filed for Salary Arbitration. On July 12, 2015, Beck's rights were traded to the Toronto Maple Leafs in exchange for forward Jamie Devane. He would sign a one-year contract with the club the following day. On the eve of the Maple Leafs training camp, on September 17, 2015, Beck was again traded, along with a group of prospects, to the New York Islanders in exchange for Michael Grabner.

Beck was later assigned by the Islanders to begin the 2015–16 season in the AHL with an affiliate, the Bridgeport Sound Tigers. After a month in Bridgeport, Beck was recalled by the Islanders on October 31 made later made his debut with the club in a 2–1 defeat to the Boston Bruins on November 8, 2015. Beck remained on the Islanders roster for a month appearing in only 1 further game before he was reassigned to the Sound Tigers on November 26, 2015. Beck added to the Bridgeport offence with 33 points in 46 games before he was dealt by the Islanders, for the third time within the year, to the Colorado Avalanche in exchange for Marc-André Cliche on February 29, 2016. He was directly assigned to remain in the AHL with the San Antonio Rampage.

After the season as a restricted free agent, Beck was not tendered a qualifying offer to remain with the Avalanche. As a free agent, Beck agreed to a one-year, two-way contract with the Edmonton Oilers on July 3, 2016. Assigned to affiliate, the Bakersfield Condors to begin the 2016–17 season, Beck led the team and was amongst the AHL scoring leaders before he was recalled to the Oilers. Beck appeared in 3 scoreless games with the Oilers before he was returned to the Condors. He amassed 50 points in just 40 games before he was dealt at the NHL trade deadline by the Oilers to the New York Rangers in exchange for Justin Fontaine on March 1, 2017. Beck continued scoring at a point-per-game pace with affiliate, the Hartford Wolf Pack, and featured in 2 regular season games with the Rangers to end the season. With 76 points in 56 games, Beck was selected to the AHL's First All-Star Team.

As an impending free agent, on June 13, 2017, Beck signed a one-year deal with the Russian club, Avtomobilist Yekaterinburg, of the Kontinental Hockey League (KHL).

During the 2018–19 season, while in his second season with Kunlun Red Star, Beck continued his scoring pace with the club notching 9 goals and 22 points through 39 games before he was traded to Avangard Omsk in exchange for the rights to Axel Holmström on December 27, 2018.

On June 4, 2020, during the off-season, Beck was traded by Omsk to Metallurg Magnitogorsk in exchange for Ilya Kablukov and Alexei Bereglazov. In the 2020–21 season, Beck acclimated quickly with Metallurg posting new KHL highs of 16 goals, 27 assists and 43 points in 56 regular season game while adding 10 points in 12 playoff contests.

As a free agent, Beck opted to continue in the KHL, agreeing to a one-year contract with Belarus-based club HC Dinamo Minsk on June 23, 2021.

On July 17, 2022, Beck continued his well-travelled tenure in the KHL by joining his sixth club, HC Sibir Novosibirsk, on a one-year contract for the 2022–23 season.

After three offensively productive season with Sibir, Beck left the KHL to sign a two-year contract with Swiss club, Genève-Servette HC of the NL, on May 14, 2025. Beck was released by Servette on November 24, 2025, to return to Sibir. He failed to adapt to the level of play of the NL, appearing in only 6 games without scoring a single point while posting a +/- of -7.

== Career statistics ==
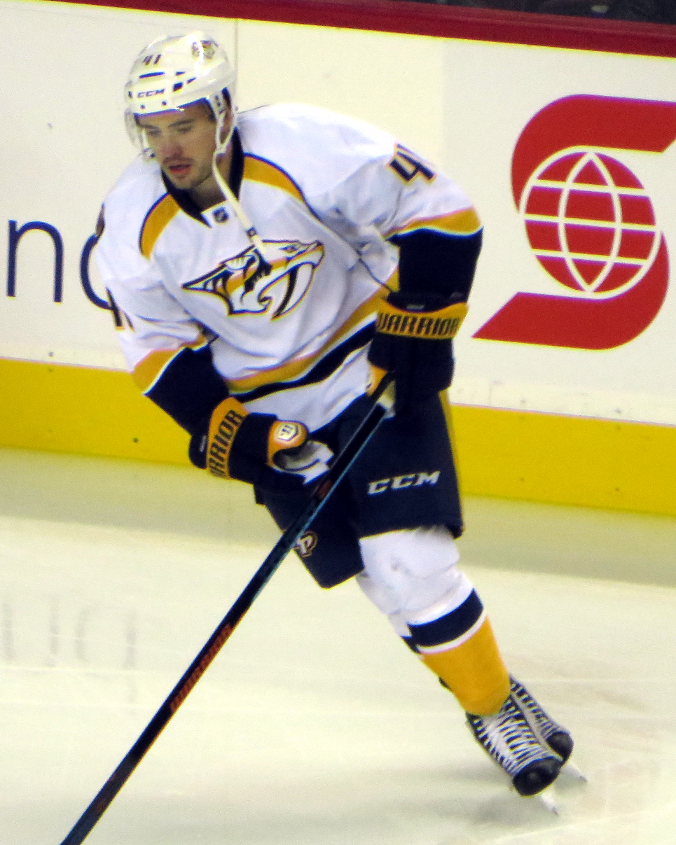
Beck during his tenure with the Predators.

=== Regular season and playoffs ===
			Regular season					Playoffs
Season	Team	League	GP	G	A	Pts	PIM	GP	G	A	Pts	PIM
2007–08	Guelph Storm	OHL	56	7	14	21	43	7	0	0	0	4
2008–09	Guelph Storm	OHL	67	22	36	58	36	4	0	0	0	2
2009–10	Guelph Storm	OHL	61	39	54	93	54	5	3	3	6	2
2010–11	Guelph Storm	OHL	62	42	53	95	60	6	3	5	8	10
2010–11	Milwaukee Admirals	AHL	4	0	1	1	0	8	2	0	2	2
2011–12	Milwaukee Admirals	AHL	74	16	24	40	32	3	0	1	1	2
2012–13	Milwaukee Admirals	AHL	50	11	30	41	28	2	0	1	1	2
2012–13	Nashville Predators	NHL	16	3	4	7	2	—	—	—	—	—
2013–14	Milwaukee Admirals	AHL	65	17	32	49	38	3	0	0	0	2
2013–14	Nashville Predators	NHL	7	0	0	0	6	—	—	—	—	—
2014–15	Nashville Predators	NHL	62	8	8	16	18	5	0	0	0	2
2015–16	Bridgeport Sound Tigers	AHL	46	16	17	33	30	—	—	—	—	—
2015–16	New York Islanders	NHL	2	0	0	0	2	—	—	—	—	—
2015–16	San Antonio Rampage	AHL	4	1	0	1	2	—	—	—	—	—
2016–17	Bakersfield Condors	AHL	40	13	37	50	18	—	—	—	—	—
2016–17	Edmonton Oilers	NHL	3	0	0	0	4	—	—	—	—	—
2016–17	Hartford Wolf Pack	AHL	16	6	10	16	6	—	—	—	—	—
2016–17	New York Rangers	NHL	2	0	0	0	0	—	—	—	—	—
2017–18	Avtomobilist Yekaterinburg	KHL	20	3	4	7	8	—	—	—	—	—
2017–18	Kunlun Red Star	KHL	21	4	9	13	12	—	—	—	—	—
2018–19	Kunlun Red Star	KHL	39	9	13	22	20	—	—	—	—	—
2018–19	Avangard Omsk	KHL	17	10	6	16	8	16	4	16	20	6
2019–20	Avangard Omsk	KHL	56	14	22	36	32	6	0	3	3	6
2020–21	Metallurg Magnitogorsk	KHL	56	16	27	43	14	12	4	6	10	2
2021–22	Dinamo Minsk	KHL	42	8	30	38	34	4	0	1	1	2
2022–23	Sibir Novosibirsk	KHL	67	18	37	55	50	5	0	2	2	2
2023–24	Sibir Novosibirsk	KHL	60	14	32	46	66	—	—	—	—	—
2024–25	Sibir Novosibirsk	KHL	57	16	40	56	63	7	3	3	6	0
2025–26	Genève-Servette HC	NL	6	0	0	0	2	—	—	—	—	—
2025–26	Sibir Novosibirsk	KHL	33	8	19	27	28	1	0	0	0	0
2026–27	Sibir Novosibirsk	KHL	11	2	3	5	8	—	—	—	—	—
NHL totals			92	11	12	23	32	5	0	0	0	2
KHL totals			479	122	242	364	343	51	11	31	42	18

=== International ===
Year	Team	Event	Result	GP	G	A	Pts	PIM
2008	Canada Ontario	U17	1st place, gold medalist(s)	3	0	1	1	0
Junior totals				3	0	1	1	0

== Awards and honours ==
Award	Year
OHL
CHL Top Prospects Game	2009
All-Star Game	2010
Second All-Star Team	2010
Jim Mahon Memorial Trophy	2010
AHL
All-Star Game	2017
First All-Star Team	2017
