= Trevor Murphy =

Canadian ice hockey player (born 1995)

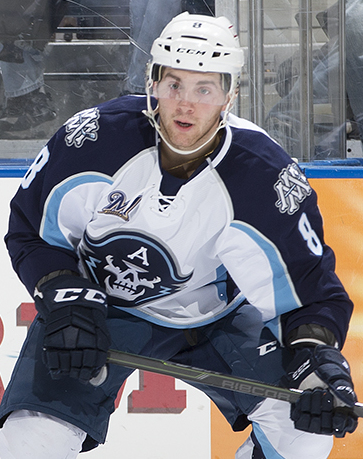
- Murphy in 2015
- Born: July 17, 1995 (age 31) Windsor, Ontario, Canada
- Height: 5 ft 10 in (178 cm)
- Weight: 181 lb (82 kg; 12 st 13 lb)
- Position: Defence
- Shoots: Left
- KHL team Former teams: SKA Saint Petersburg; Arizona Coyotes; Kunlun Red Star; Ak Bars Kazan; Sibir Novosibirsk
- NHL draft: Undrafted
- Playing career: 2015–present

Trevor Murphy (born July 17, 1995) is a Canadian professional ice hockey defenceman who is currently playing for SKA Saint Petersburg of the Kontinental Hockey League (KHL). He has formerly played in the National Hockey League (NHL) with the Arizona Coyotes.

== Playing career ==
Trevor was raised in Windsor, Ontario, and played for the Sun County Panthers AAA, where he played on the blue line with Calder Trophy winner Aaron Ekblad. That same year he had an outstanding 92 points in 59 games. He was selected by the Peterborough Petes in the 3rd Round of the OHL Priority Draft.

On November 22, 2012, Murphy was traded from the Petes to his hometown Windsor Spitfires. After the 2013 season, Murphy was assigned assistant captain. That season he ranked as the 4th best scoring defence, earning 63 points and leading his team.

After going unnoticed in the 2014 and 2015 NHL entry drafts, he attended the Nashville Predators prospect camp. On September 17, 2015, he signed an entry-level contract with the Predators and was assigned to their farm team, the Milwaukee Admirals.

During the 2018 trade deadline and while in the final year of his rookie contract, Murphy, along with Pierre-Cédric Labrie were traded by the Predators to the Arizona Coyotes in exchange for Tyler Gaudet and John Ramage. He made his NHL debut on March 24, 2018, in a game against the Florida Panthers. He recorded his first NHL goal in a 4–1 win over the Tampa Bay Lightning on March 26, 2018.

In the following 2018–19 season, Murphy continued in the AHL with the Coyotes' affiliate, the Tucson Roadrunners. Murphy was leading the Roadrunners with 5 goals from the blueline and collected 13 points in 27 games before he was traded by Arizona to the Anaheim Ducks in exchange for Giovanni Fiore on December 28, 2018. He was assigned for the remainder of the season to AHL affiliate, the San Diego Gulls, helping the club reach the Western Conference Finals with 6 points in 16 post-season games.

After four North American professional seasons with limited NHL time, Murphy opted to sign his first contract abroad, agreeing to a two-year contract with Chinese club, Kunlun Red Star of the KHL, on June 7, 2019.

In the midst of his second year with Kunlun Red Star in the 2020–21 season, after collecting 8 assists through 17 games, Murphy was traded to contending club, Ak Bars Kazan, on December 4, 2020. Murphy registered a further 8 points through 21 regular season games with Ak Bars, before helping the club advance to the Eastern Conference finals, adding 4 points in 8 games.

Prior to the 2021–22 season, Murphy was traded by Ak Bars Kazan to HC Sibir Novosibirsk in exchange for monetary compensation on 17 August 2021.

Murphy featured with Sibir for four seasons before leaving as a free agent to sign a two-year contract to continue his tenure in the KHL with SKA Saint Petersburg on July 8, 2025.

== Career statistics ==
=== Regular season and playoffs ===
			Regular season					Playoffs
Season	Team	League	GP	G	A	Pts	PIM	GP	G	A	Pts	PIM
2010–11	Sun County Panthers AAA	Midget	59	39	53	92	50	—	—	—	—	—
2010–11	LaSalle Vipers	GOJHL	3	0	1	1	2	—	—	—	—	—
2011–12	Peterborough Petes	OHL	60	1	19	20	52	—	—	—	—	—
2012–13	Peterborough Petes	OHL	23	2	2	4	23	—	—	—	—	—
2012–13	Windsor Spitfires	OHL	42	7	17	24	60	—	—	—	—	—
2013–14	Windsor Spitfires	OHL	51	8	21	29	57	—	—	—	—	—
2014–15	Windsor Spitfires	OHL	59	24	39	63	104	—	—	—	—	—
2015–16	Milwaukee Admirals	AHL	59	11	21	32	37	3	1	0	1	2
2016–17	Milwaukee Admirals	AHL	75	12	21	33	92	3	2	0	2	4
2017–18	Milwaukee Admirals	AHL	48	8	18	26	69	—	—	—	—	—
2017–18	Tucson Roadrunners	AHL	11	2	7	9	4	9	1	5	6	25
2017–18	Arizona Coyotes	NHL	8	1	2	3	0	—	—	—	—	—
2018–19	Tucson Roadrunners	AHL	27	5	8	13	26	—	—	—	—	—
2018–19	San Diego Gulls	AHL	37	3	15	18	48	16	1	5	6	4
2019–20	Kunlun Red Star	KHL	60	10	17	27	82	—	—	—	—	—
2020–21	Kunlun Red Star	KHL	17	0	8	8	14	—	—	—	—	—
2020–21	Ak Bars Kazan	KHL	21	2	6	8	8	8	1	3	4	2
2021–22	Sibir Novosibirsk	KHL	26	6	13	19	37	—	—	—	—	—
2022–23	Sibir Novosibirsk	KHL	62	10	36	46	74	5	2	2	4	0
2023–24	Sibir Novosibirsk	KHL	31	6	11	17	34	—	—	—	—	—
2024–25	Sibir Novosibirsk	KHL	64	13	45	58	48	7	2	4	6	17
2025–26	SKA Saint Petersburg	KHL	31	4	17	21	24	—	—	—	—	—
NHL totals			8	1	2	3	0	—	—	—	—	—
KHL totals			312	51	153	204	321	20	5	9	14	19

=== International ===
Year	Team	Event	Result	GP	G	A	Pts	PIM
2012	Canada Ontario	U17	3rd place, bronze medalist(s)	6	1	1	2	2
Junior totals				6	1	1	2	2
