= Igor Nikitin (ice hockey) =

Russian ice hockey player (born 1973)

Igor Valeryevich Nikitin
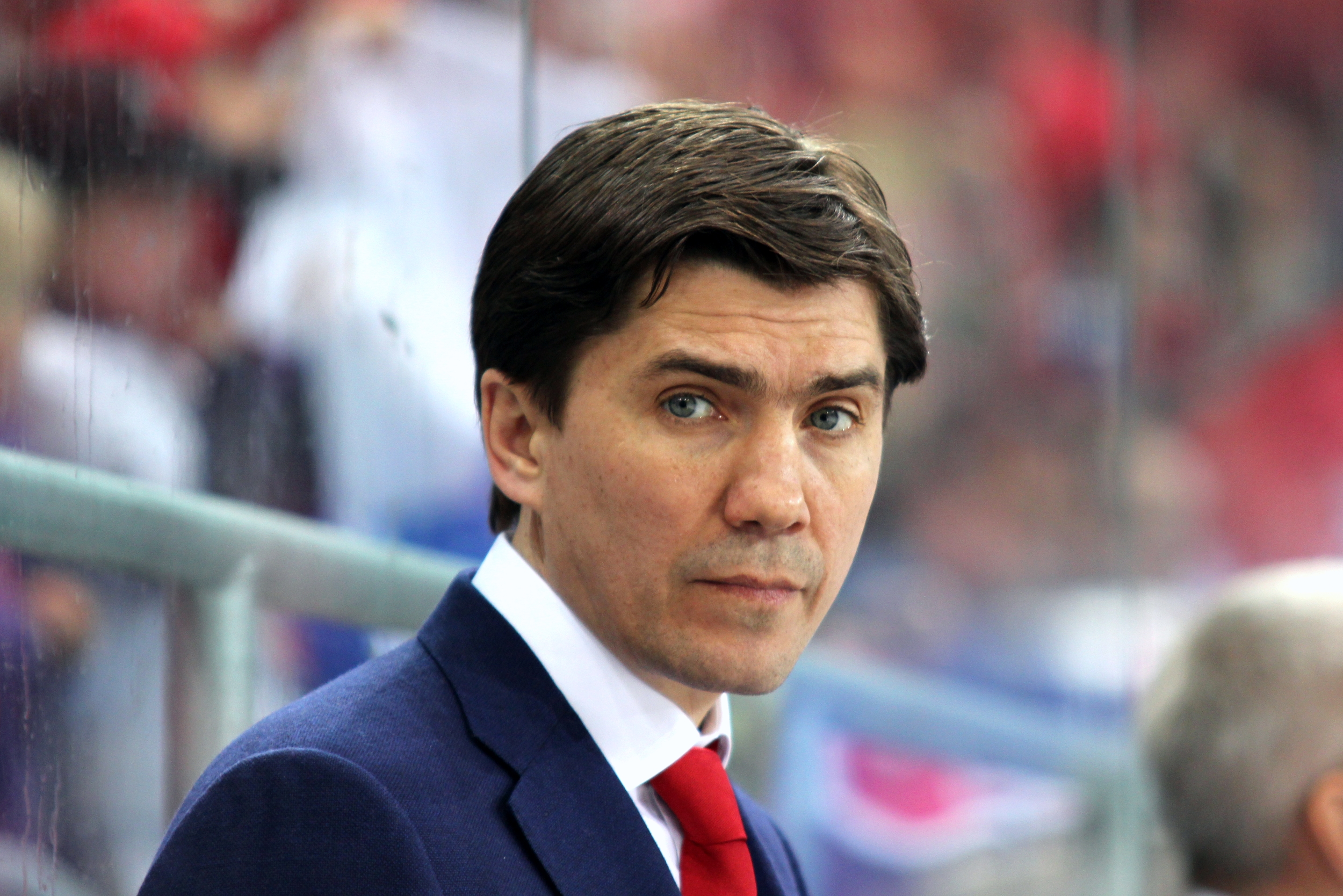
- Igor Nikitin in 2017
- Born: March 23, 1973 (age 52) Ust-Kamenogorsk, Kazakh SSR, Soviet Union
- Height: 6 ft 2 in (188 cm)
- Weight: 198 lb (90 kg; 14 st 2 lb)
- Position: Defense
- Played for: Torpedo U-K; Lada Togliatti; Neftekhimik Nizhnekamsk; Avangard Omsk; Sibir Novosibirsk
- Current KHL coach: CSKA Moscow
- Coached for: Avangard Omsk; Lokomotiv Yaroslavl; Russia
- Playing career: 1990–2008
- Coaching career: 2008–present

Igor Valeryevich Nikitin (Russian: И́горь Вале́рьевич Ники́тин; March 23, 1973, Ust-Kamenogorsk, Kazakh SSR) is a former Soviet-Kazakhstani hockey player, whom after the end of his playing career became a coach. He is currently the head coach of HC CSKA Moscow of the Kontinental Hockey League (KHL).

== Career statistics ==
=== Regular season and playoffs ===
			Regular season					Playoffs
Season	Team	League	GP	G	A	Pts	PIM	GP	G	A	Pts	PIM
1990–91	Torpedo Ust–Kamenogorsk	URS	13	1	0	1	4	—	—	—	—	—
1991–92	Torpedo Ust–Kamenogorsk	CIS	36	0	0	0	12	6	0	0	0	0
1992–93	Torpedo Ust–Kamenogorsk	IHL	34	1	0	1	24	1	0	0	0	0
1992–93	Torpedo–2 Ust–Kamenogorsk	RUS.2	4	0	0	0	0	—	—	—	—	—
1993–94	Torpedo Ust–Kamenogorsk	IHL	15	0	2	2	18	—	—	—	—	—
1994–95	Lada Togliatti	IHL	36	0	5	5	8	12	1	0	1	0
1994–95	Lada–2 Togliatti	RUS.2	1	0	—	—	—	—	—	—	—	—
1995–96	Lada Togliatti	IHL	51	1	4	5	18	3	0	0	0	0
1995–96	Lada–2 Togliatti	RUS.2	2	0	0	0	0	—	—	—	—	—
1996–97	Lada Togliatti	RSL	10	0	1	1	8	—	—	—	—	—
1996–97	Lada–2 Togliatti	RUS.3	1	0	0	0	0	—	—	—	—	—
1996–97	Neftyanik Almetyevsk	RUS.2	10	1	1	2	16	—	—	—	—	—
1996–97	Neftekhimik Nizhnekamsk	RSL	19	3	0	3	22	2	0	0	0	4
1997–98	Avangard Omsk	RSL	38	2	3	5	61	4	0	0	0	2
1998–99	Avangard Omsk	RSL	29	0	0	0	10	6	0	0	0	20
1999–2000	Avangard Omsk	RSL	34	1	4	5	43	7	1	0	1	29
2000–01	Avangard Omsk	RSL	37	1	7	8	18	16	1	1	2	22
2001–02	Avangard Omsk	RSL	44	0	5	5	30	11	0	0	0	12
2002–03	Avangard Omsk	RSL	50	1	10	11	36	12	0	3	3	16
2003–04	Avangard Omsk	RSL	45	1	1	2	34	11	0	1	1	2
2004–05	Avangard Omsk	RSL	47	1	0	1	48	9	0	1	1	18
2004–05	Omskie Yastreby	RUS.3	3	0	0	0	2	—	—	—	—	—
2005–06	Avangard Omsk	RSL	17	1	1	2	10	—	—	—	—	—
2006–07	Sibir Novosibirsk	RSL	41	0	6	6	50	6	0	0	0	30
2007–08	Sibir Novosibirsk	RSL	52	1	7	8	42	—	—	—	—	—
IHL totals			136	2	11	13	68	16	1	0	1	0
RSL totals			463	12	45	57	412	84	2	6	8	155

=== International ===
Year	Team	Event	GP	G	A	Pts	PIM
1991	Soviet Union	EJC	5	1	1	2	0
1994	Kazakhstan	WC C	6	0	0	0	6
1997	Kazakhstan	WC B	7	0	2	2	6
1998	Kazakhstan	OG	7	1	0	1	6
1998	Kazakhstan	WC	3	0	0	0	0
Senior totals			23	1	2	3	18
