= Alexander Boikov =

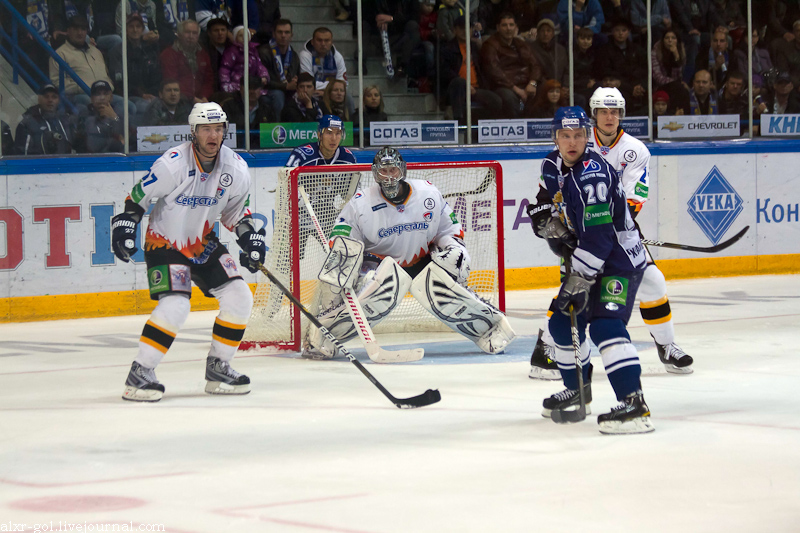
- Born: 3 February 1975 (age 51) Moscow, Russian SFSR, Soviet Union
- Height: 6 ft 0 in (183 cm)
- Weight: 185 lb (84 kg; 13 st 3 lb)
- Position: Forward
- Shot: Right
- Played for: Krylia Sovetov; CSKA Moscow; Lada Togliatti; Atlant Mytishchi; Sibir Novosibirsk; Severstal Cherepovets
- NHL draft: Undrafted
- Playing career: 1991–2012

Alexander Rafailovich Boikov (born 3 February 1975) is a Russian former professional ice hockey forward who played in the Kontinental Hockey League (KHL). He was a captain for HC Sibir Novosibirsk for two seasons. He ended his 21-year professional career, following the 2011-12 season with Severstal Cherepovets.

== Career statistics ==
			Regular season					Playoffs
Season	Team	League	GP	G	A	Pts	PIM	GP	G	A	Pts	PIM
1991–92	Krylia Sovetov	RSL	1	0	0	0	0	—	—	—	—	—
1992–93	Krylia Sovetov	RSL	5	0	0	0	2	—	—	—	—	—
1993–94	Krylia Sovetov	RSL	27	1	2	3	2	—	—	—	—	—
1994–95	Krylia Sovetov	RSL	30	3	4	7	8	—	—	—	—	—
1995–96	Krylia Sovetov	RSL	51	11	6	17	22	—	—	—	—	—
1996–97	Krylia Sovetov	RSL	44	16	8	24	26	—	—	—	—	—
1997–98	Krylia Sovetov	RSL	43	7	8	15	10	—	—	—	—	—
1998–99	Krylia Sovetov	RSL	31	7	9	16	12	—	—	—	—	—
1999–00	CSKA Moscow	RSL	38	6	10	16	28	—	—	—	—	—
2000–01	CSKA Moscow	RSL	41	6	11	17	22	—	—	—	—	—
2001–02	Lada Togliatti	RSL	46	9	8	17	14	1	0	0	0	0
2002–03	Lada Togliatti	RSL	47	12	14	26	37	10	3	5	8	2
2003–04	Lada Togliatti	RSL	47	7	12	19	14	6	2	0	2	0
2004–05	Lada Togliatti	RSL	56	5	20	25	39	10	2	5	7	4
2005–06	Lada Togliatti	RSL	23	5	4	9	12	—	—	—	—	—
2005–06	Atlant Mytishchi	RSL	22	4	5	9	4	—	—	—	—	—
2006–07	Atlant Mytishchi	RSL	51	10	10	20	34	9	2	2	4	2
2007–08	Atlant Mytishchi	RSL	50	4	15	19	36	5	1	0	1	10
2008–09	Atlant Mytishchi	KHL	56	5	10	15	30	7	2	0	2	0
2009–10	Sibir Novosibirsk	KHL	56	16	21	37	50	—	—	—	—	—
2010–11	Sibir Novosibirsk	KHL	41	9	5	14	30	2	0	1	1	4
2011–12	Severstal Cherepovets	KHL	22	0	1	1	6	—	—	—	—	—
RSL totals			652	113	143	256	322	41	10	12	22	18
KHL totals			175	30	38	68	116	9	2	1	3	4
