= Vladimir Boykov =

Russian footballer

Personal information
- Full name: Vladimir Vitalyevich Boykov
- Date of birth: 3 June 1976 (age 50)
- Place of birth: Kostroma, Russian SFSR
- Height: 1.83 m (6 ft 0 in)
- Position: Midfielder

Senior career*
Years	Team	Apps	(Gls)
1992–1999	FC Spartak Kostroma	184	(8)
1999–2001	FC Dynamo Vologda	92	(4)
2002	FC Dynamo-SPb St. Petersburg	8	(0)
2002	FC Spartak Lukhovitsy	18	(0)
2003–2006	FC Oryol	156	(10)
2007	FC Spartak Kostroma	28	(1)
2008	FC Ryazan	20	(0)
2009	FC Lokomotiv Liski	30	(1)
2010	FC Spartak Kostroma	31	(0)
2011	FC Dynamo Kostroma	29	(1)
- * Club domestic league appearances and goals

Vladimir Vitalyevich Boykov (Russian: Владимир Витальевич Бойков; born 3 June 1976) is a former Russian professional football player.

== Club career ==
He played 4 seasons in the Russian Football National League for FC Dynamo Saint Petersburg and FC Oryol.
