= Jonas Enlund =

Finnish ice hockey player (born 1987)

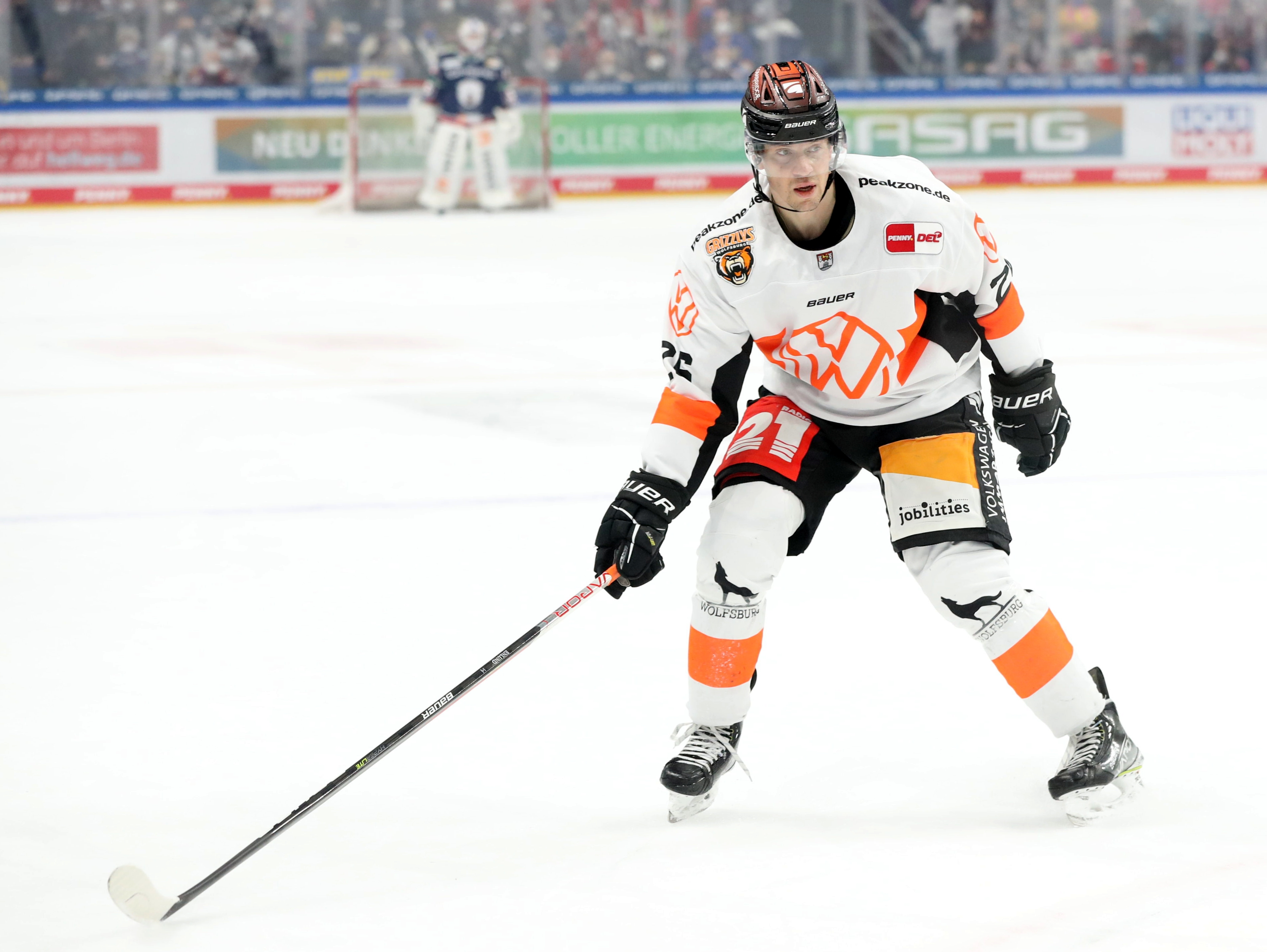
- Born: 3 November 1987 (age 38) Helsinki, Finland
- Height: 6 ft 0 in (183 cm)
- Weight: 188 lb (85 kg; 13 st 6 lb)
- Position: Winger
- Shoots: Left
- PHL team Former teams: Zagłębie Sosnowiec; Tappara; Sibir Novosibirsk; Lokomotiv Yaroslavl; SKA Saint Petersburg; CSKA Moscow; Kunlun Red Star; Traktor Chelyabinsk; Neftekhimik Nizhnekamsk; Grizzlys Wolfsburg; Lahti Pelicans
- National team: Finland
- NHL draft: 165th overall, 2006; Atlanta Thrashers
- Playing career: 2006–present

Jonas Enlund (born 3 November 1987 in Helsinki, Finland) is a Finnish professional ice hockey winger who is currently playing for Zagłębie Sosnowiec in the Polska Hokej Liga (PHL).

== Playing career ==
Jonas Enlund is a product of the HIFK youth academy, but made his professional debut in the then Finnish SM-liiga for Tappara. Enlund was drafted in the sixth round, 165th overall, of the 2006 NHL entry draft by the Atlanta Thrashers.

He played four full seasons for Tappara before moving to Russian team HC Sibir Novosibirsk, where he spent five years in the Kontinental Hockey League (KHL). Enlund spent most of the 2015–16 season with fellow KHL outfit Lokomotiv Yaroslavl and had a short stint at SKA St. Petersburg.

In July 2016, he signed with his fourth KHL club, CSKA Moscow, before transferring to HC Kunlun Red Star, the Chinese KHL side, in November 2016.

As a free agent leading into the 2019–20 season, Enlund opted to continue his career in the KHL, agreeing to a contract with HC Neftekhimik Nizhnekamsk on 12 October 2019.

== Career statistics ==
=== Regular season and playoffs ===
			Regular season					Playoffs
Season	Team	League	GP	G	A	Pts	PIM	GP	G	A	Pts	PIM
2002–03	HIFK	FIN U18	24	11	3	14	0	2	1	0	1	0
2003–04	HIFK	FIN U18	30	15	16	31	30	7	3	5	8	2
2003–04	HIFK	FIN U20	3	0	0	0	0	—	—	—	—	—
2004–05	HIFK	FIN U20	38	15	15	30	18	2	1	1	2	0
2004–05	HIFK	FIN U18	—	—	—	—	—	7	3	4	7	8
2005–06	HIFK	FIN U20	37	24	18	42	14	—	—	—	—	—
2006–07	Tappara	FIN U20	10	2	7	9	12	4	3	0	3	2
2006–07	Tappara	SM-l	46	2	1	3	8	5	0	0	0	0
2007–08	Tappara	SM-l	56	19	22	41	10	11	3	3	6	4
2008–09	Tappara	SM-l	58	11	16	27	26	—	—	—	—	—
2009–10	Tappara	SM-l	58	28	21	49	28	9	4	3	7	8
2010–11	Sibir Novosibirsk	KHL	52	9	15	24	20	3	0	0	0	0
2011–12	Sibir Novosibirsk	KHL	53	17	19	36	26	—	—	—	—	—
2012–13	Sibir Novosibirsk	KHL	51	14	24	38	30	7	1	0	1	0
2013–14	Sibir Novosibirsk	KHL	53	19	14	33	24	10	4	2	6	4
2014–15	Sibir Novosibirsk	KHL	52	17	28	45	4	16	1	7	8	4
2015–16	Lokomotiv Yaroslavl	KHL	27	4	1	5	2	—	—	—	—	—
2015–16	SKA St. Petersburg	KHL	1	0	1	1	0	—	—	—	—	—
2016–17	CSKA Moscow	KHL	25	4	8	12	12	—	—	—	—	—
2016–17	Kunlun Red Star	KHL	8	0	0	0	25	—	—	—	—	—
2017–18	Sibir Novosibirsk	KHL	55	9	17	26	20	—	—	—	—	—
2018–19	Traktor Chelyabinsk	KHL	45	5	13	18	14	4	0	1	1	0
2019–20	Neftekhimik Nizhnekamsk	KHL	41	13	9	22	16	4	0	0	0	4
2020–21	Neftekhimik Nizhnekamsk	KHL	39	3	10	13	6	—	—	—	—	—
2021–22	Grizzlys Wolfsburg	DEL	32	6	5	11	10	8	0	1	1	4
2022–23	Pelicans	Liiga	2	0	0	0	2	—	—	—	—	—
SM-l totals			228	60	60	120	74	25	7	6	13	12
KHL totals			502	114	159	273	199	44	6	10	16	12

=== International ===
Year	Team	Event	GP	G	A	Pts	PIM
2004	Finland	U17	5	3	3	6	0
2005	Finland	WJC18	6	1	3	4	0
2007	Finland	WJC	6	1	0	1	6
2018	Finland	OG	5	0	0	0	0
Junior totals			17	5	6	11	6
Senior totals			5	0	0	0	0
