= HC Sibir Novosibirsk =

Ice hockey team based in Novosibirsk, Russia

Sibir Novosibirsk
- City: Novosibirsk, Russia
- League: KHL; 2008–present: RSL 1996–1998, 2002–2008; Vysshaya Liga 1992–1994, 1998–2002; IHL 1994–1996; Soviet League Class A2 1963–1965, 1971–1975, 1976–1983, 1984–1992; Soviet League Class A 1962–1963, 1965–1971, 1975–1976, 1983–1984
- Conference: Eastern
- Division: Chernyshev
- Founded: 1962
- Home arena: Sibir Arena (capacity: 11,650)
- Colours
- Owners: Novosibirsk Oblast Administration; Andrey Travnikov, chairman
- General manager: Viktor Merkulov
- Head coach: Yaroslav Lyuzenkov
- Captain: Yegor Alanov
- Affiliates: Dynamo-Altay (VHL); Sibirskie Snaypery (MHL)
- Website: hcsibir.ru
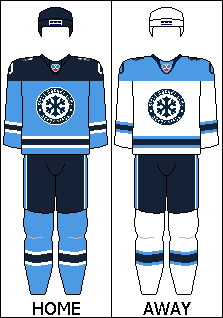

Franchise history
- Хоккейный клуб Сибирь

Hockey Club Sibir Novosibirsk Oblast (Russian: ХК Сибирь, English: Siberia HC), also known as HC Sibir or Sibir Novosibirsk, is a professional ice hockey club based in Novosibirsk, Russia. It is a member of the Chernyshev Division in the Kontinental Hockey League (KHL).

== History ==
Ice hockey was introduced to Novosibirsk in 1948 by Ivan Tsyba, who returned from a hockey seminar in Moscow with equipment to play the sport. Immediately popular amongst the populace, the local sports society, Dynamo, decided to establish a hockey team. The first hockey rink was built in autumn 1948 near the Ob River. A second rink was built in February 1949, at the Spartak Stadium. Several teams played in Novosibirsk in this era, the strongest being Dynamo. They were promoted to the Soviet Championship League for the 1954–55 season, finishing in ninth place overall, out of ten teams. They would finish as high as ninth two more times in the Soviet era, in both 1956–57 and 1959–60 (when the league had 16 and 18 teams, respectively). A youth team was formed in 1954, to serve as a development club for the senior team. In its first season of play, it won bronze in the national championship.

In 1962, owing to financial difficulties, Dynamo merged with another team in Novosibirsk, Khimik. Though Dynamo played in the top division, its equipment was of a lesser quality than Khimik, which played in the lowest division and was run by a local chemical factory; the resulting team was renamed Sibir Novosibirsk.

During the first decades of its history, Sibir was subsequently relegated between the elite and second-rate divisions of the Soviet and Russian hockey championships until it finally settled in the Superleague after the 2002–03 season.

After the formation of the Kontinental Hockey League, the team had to change 50% of its roster. Starting with the 2009–10 season, the head coach position was taken by Andrei Tarasenko, a former Novosibirsk forward and a father of the club's young winger Vladimir Tarasenko, who led Sibir to its first Gagarin Cup playoffs in 2011.

Before the 2013–14 season, Sibir changed its full name from Sibir Novosibirsk to Sibir Novosibirsk Oblast.

After the 2022 Russian invasion of Ukraine, Nick Shore and Harri Sateri elected to leave the team.

== Season-by-season record ==
Note: GP = Games played, W = Wins, L = Losses, T = Ties, OTL = Overtime/shootout losses, Pts = Points, GF = Goals for, GA = Goals against

Season	GP	W	L	OTL	Pts	GF	GA	Finish	Top Scorer	Playoffs
2008–09	56	15	28	5	64	146	178	5th, Kharlamov	Evgeny Lapin (40 points: 22 G, 18 A; 55 GP)	Did not qualify
2009–10	56	15	30	1	63	147	190	4th, Kharlamov	Alexander Boikov (37 points: 16 G, 21 A; 56 GP)	Did not qualify
2010–11	54	22	21	4	83	133	131	3rd, Kharlamov	Igor Mirnov (40 points: 16 G, 24 A; 53 GP)	Lost in Conference Quarterfinals, 0–4 (Salavat Yulaev Ufa)
2011–12	54	12	27	2	57	132	154	6th, Kharlamov	Vladimir Tarasenko (38 points: 18 G, 20 A; 39 GP)	Did not qualify
2012–13	52	21	17	3	84	124	119	4th, Kharlamov	Jori Lehterä (48 points: 17 G, 31 A; 52 GP)	Lost in Conference Quarterfinals, 3–4 (Avangard Omsk)
2013–14	54	22	18	1	87	125	117	3rd, Kharlamov	Jori Lehterä (44 points: 12 G, 32 A; 48 GP)	Lost in Conference Semifinals, 0–4 (Magnitogorsk)
2014–15	60	34	20	2	111	176	125	1st, Kharlamov	Jonas Enlund (45 points: 17 G, 28 A; 52 GP)	Lost in Conference Finals, 1–4 (Ak Bars Kazan)
2015–16	60	36	15	9	105	155	133	2nd, Kharlamov	Sergei Shumakov (33 points: 20 G, 13 A; 59 GP)	Lost in Conference Semifinals, 1–4 (Magnitogorsk)
2016–17	60	28	25	7	83	133	138	6th, Kharlamov	Maxim Shalunov (37 points: 19 G, 18 A; 49 GP)	Did not qualify
2017–18	56	31	23	2	87	136	135	4th, Kharlamov	Patrik Zackrisson (42 points: 13 G, 29 A; 56 GP)	Did not qualify
2018–19	62	24	32	6	54	148	192	4th, Kharlamov	Dmitri Sayustov (31 points: 12 G, 19 A; 54 GP)	Did not qualify
2019–20	62	34	22	6	74	139	143	3rd, Kharlamov	Mikael Ruohomaa (44 points: 13 G, 31 A; 61 GP)	Won in Conference Quarterfinals, 4–1 (Avtomobilist); Playoffs cancelled due to COVID-19 pandemic
2020–21	60	27	29	4	58	146	155	4th, Chernyshev	Mikael Ruohomaa (39 points: 9 G, 30 A; 55 GP)	Did not qualify
2021–22	50	26	19	5	57	109	108	3rd, Chernyshev	Nick Shore (26 points: 10 G, 16 A; 49 GP)	Lost in Conference Quarterfinals, 1–4 (Salavat Yulaev Ufa)
2022–23	68	38	23	7	83	172	161	3rd, Chernyshev	Taylor Beck (55 points: 18 G, 37 A; 67 GP)	Lost in Conference Quarterfinals, 1–4 (Avangard Omsk)
2023–24	68	20	29	8	67	146	172	4th, Chernyshev	Taylor Beck (46 points: 14 G, 32 A; 60 GP)	Did not qualify
2024–25	68	29	28	11	69	171	196	3rd, Chernyshev	Trevor Murphy (58 points: 13 G, 45 A; 64 GP)	Lost in Conference Quarterfinals, 3–4 (Salavat Yulaev Ufa)
2025–26	68	30	29	9	69	160	195	3rd, Chernyshev	Anton Kosolapov (38 points: 17 G, 21 A; 37 GP)	Lost in Conference Quarterfinals, 1–4 (Metallurg Magnitogorsk)

== Players ==
=== Current roster ===
Updated 22 October 2026.

No.	Nat	Player	Pos	S/G	Age	Acquired	Birthplace
97	(Russia)	Mikhail Abramov	F	L	25	2025	Moscow, Russia
21	(Russia)	Yegor Alanov (C)	D	L	25	2021	Rotenburg, Germany
38	(Russia)	Nikita Baklashyov	D	L	21	2025	Moscow, Russia
1	(Russia)	Mikhail Berdin	G	L	28	2025	Ufa, Russia
5	(Russia)	Daniil Chayka	D	L	24	2026	Moscow, Russia
44	(Canada)	Darren Dietz (A)	D	R	33	2026	Medicine Hat, Alberta, Canada
90	(Russia)	Denis Gabdrakhmanov	G	L	21	2026	Nizhny Tagil, Russia
71	(Russia)	Aleksandr Kisakov	F	L	23	2026	Solikamsk, Russia
96	(Russia)	Yegor Korshkov	F	L	30	2026	Novosibirsk, Russia
11	(Russia)	Semyon Koshelev	F	L	30	2026	Oskemen, Kazakhstan
15	(Russia)	Anton Kosolapov	F	R	24	2025	Kirov, Kirov Oblast, Russia
33	(Russia)	Anton Krasotkin	G	L	29	2020	Yaroslavl, Russia
8	(Russia)	Daniil Lazutin	F	L	23	2026	Moscow, Russia
86	(Russia)	Ilya Lyuzenkov	F	L	20	2024	Novosibirsk, Russia
12	(Russia)	Arkhip Nekolenko (A)	C	R	30	2025	Maryino, Russia
13	(Russia)	Stepan Nikulin	F	R	25	2026	Yaroslavl, Russia
31	(Russia)	Alexander Mirzabalayev	F	L	24	2026	Moscow, Russia
47	(Russia)	Ivan Mishchenko	D	L	31	2026	Omsk, Russia
74	(Russia)	Mikhail Orlov	D	L	34	2025	Moscow, Russia
23	(Russia)	Maxim Osipov	D	R	33	2026	Yaroslavl, Russia
28	(Russia)	Alexander Pershakov	RW	L	20	2024	Novosibirsk, Russia
34	(Russia)	Sergey Popov	F	L	26	2026	Korolyov, Russia
17	(Russia)	Nikita Smirnov	D	L	24	2026	Kuznetsk, Russia
24	(Belarus)	Maxim Sushko	C	L	27	2025	Drahichyn, Brest region, Belarus
18	(Russia)	Pavel Tyutnev	F	L	24	2026	Voskresensk, Moscow Oblast, Russia
91	(Russia)	Daniil Valitov	D	R	26	2025	Perm, Russia
22	(Russia)	Daniil Volkov	D	L	19	2026	Omsk, Russia
88	(Russia)	Ivan Vorobyov	F	R	24	2026	Surgut, Russia
95	(Russia)	Alexander Yaremchuk	F	L	27	2026	Slavuta, Khmelnytskyi Oblast, Ukraine

=== Team captains ===
- Sergei Klimovich, 2002–2003
- Ravil Yakubov, 2003–2005
- Oleg Belov, 2005–2007
- Igor Nikitin, 2007–2008
- Dmitri Yushkevich, 2008–2009
- Alexander Boikov, 2009–2011
- Georgijs Pujacs, 2011–2012
- Maxim Krivonozhkin, 2012–2013
- Alexei Kopeikin, 2013–2016
- Evgeny Artyukhin, 2016
- Stepan Sannikov, 2016–2017
- Sergei Konkov, 2017–2018
- Konstantin Alexeyev, 2018
- Oleg Piganovich, 2018
- Jukka Peltola, 2018–2019
- Alexander Loginov, 2019–2020
- Evgeny Chesalin, 2020–2023
- Nikolai Prokhorkin, 2023
- Nikita Korotkov, 2023–2024
- Sergei Shirokov, 2024–2026
- Yegor Alanov, 2026–present

== Franchise records and leaders ==
=== KHL scoring leaders ===
These are the top-ten point-scorers in franchise history. Figures are updated after each completed KHL regular season.

Note: Pos = Position; GP = Games played; G = Goals; A = Assists; Pts = Points; P/G = Points per game; = current Novosibirsk player

Points
Player	Pos	GP	G	A	Pts	P/G
(Finland) Jonas Enlund	L W	316	85	114	199	0.63
(Canada) Taylor Beck	RW	217	56	128	184	0.85
(Russia) Alexander Sharov	C	348	84	90	174	0.50
(Russia) Egor Milovzorov	RW	292	52	93	145	0.50
(Canada) Trevor Murphy	D	183	35	105	140	0.76
(Russia) Stepan Sannikov	LW	462	52	85	137	0.30
(Russia) Vladimir Butuzov	RW	328	66	69	135	0.41
(Finland) Jori Lehterä	C	125	39	79	118	0.94
(Russia) Sergei Shumakov	LW	235	57	48	105	0.45
(Russia) Konstantin Alexeyev	D	639	11	91	102	0.16

Goals
Player	Pos	G
(Finland) Jonas Enlund	LW	85
(Russia) Alexander Sharov	C	84
(Russia) Vladimir Butuzov	RW	66
(Russia) Sergei Shumakov	LW	57
(Canada) Taylor Beck	RW	56
(Canada) Andy Andreoff	LW	55
(Russia) Egor Milovzorov	RW	52
(Russia) Stepan Sannikov	LW	52
(Russia) Vladimir Tarasenko	RW	47
(Russia) Alexei Kopeikin	LW	46

Assists
Player	Pos	A
(Canada) Taylor Beck	RW	128
(Finland) Jonas Enlund	LW	114
(Canada) Trevor Murphy	D	105
(Russia) Egor Milovzorov	RW	93
(Russia) Konstantin Alexeyev	D	91
(Russia) Alexander Sharov	C	90
(Russia) Stepan Sannikov	LW	85
(Finland) Jori Lehterä	C	79
(Russia) Vladimir Butuzov	RW	69
(Russia) Alexander Kutuzov	D	63

== Honors ==
=== Champions ===
(gold) Vysshaya Liga (2): 1993, 2002

(gold) Etela-Saimaa Lappeenranta (1): 2012

=== Runners-up ===
(bronze) Gagarin Cup (1): 2015
