= Sibir Arena =

Indoor ice hockey arena in Novosibirsk, Russia

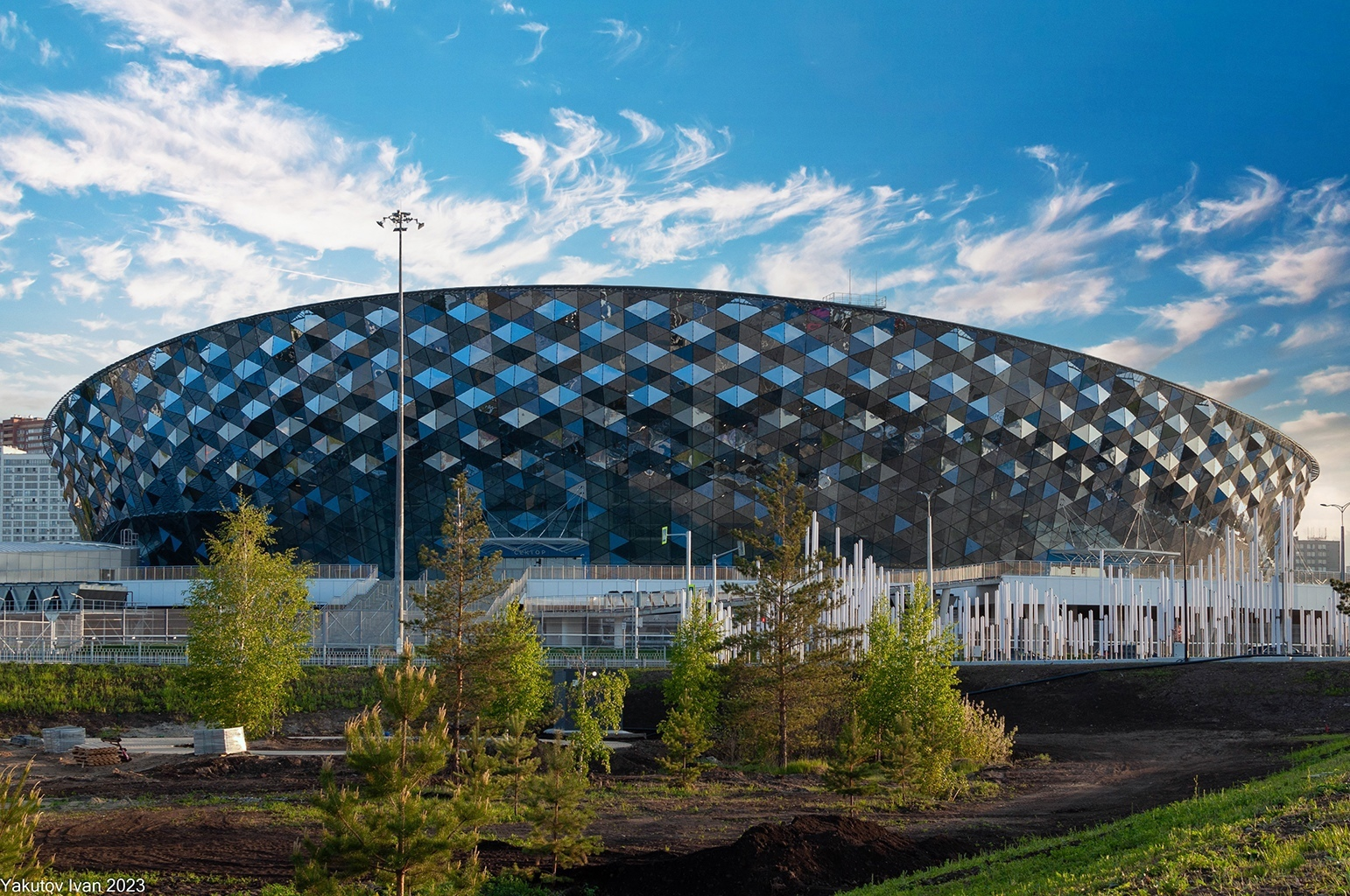
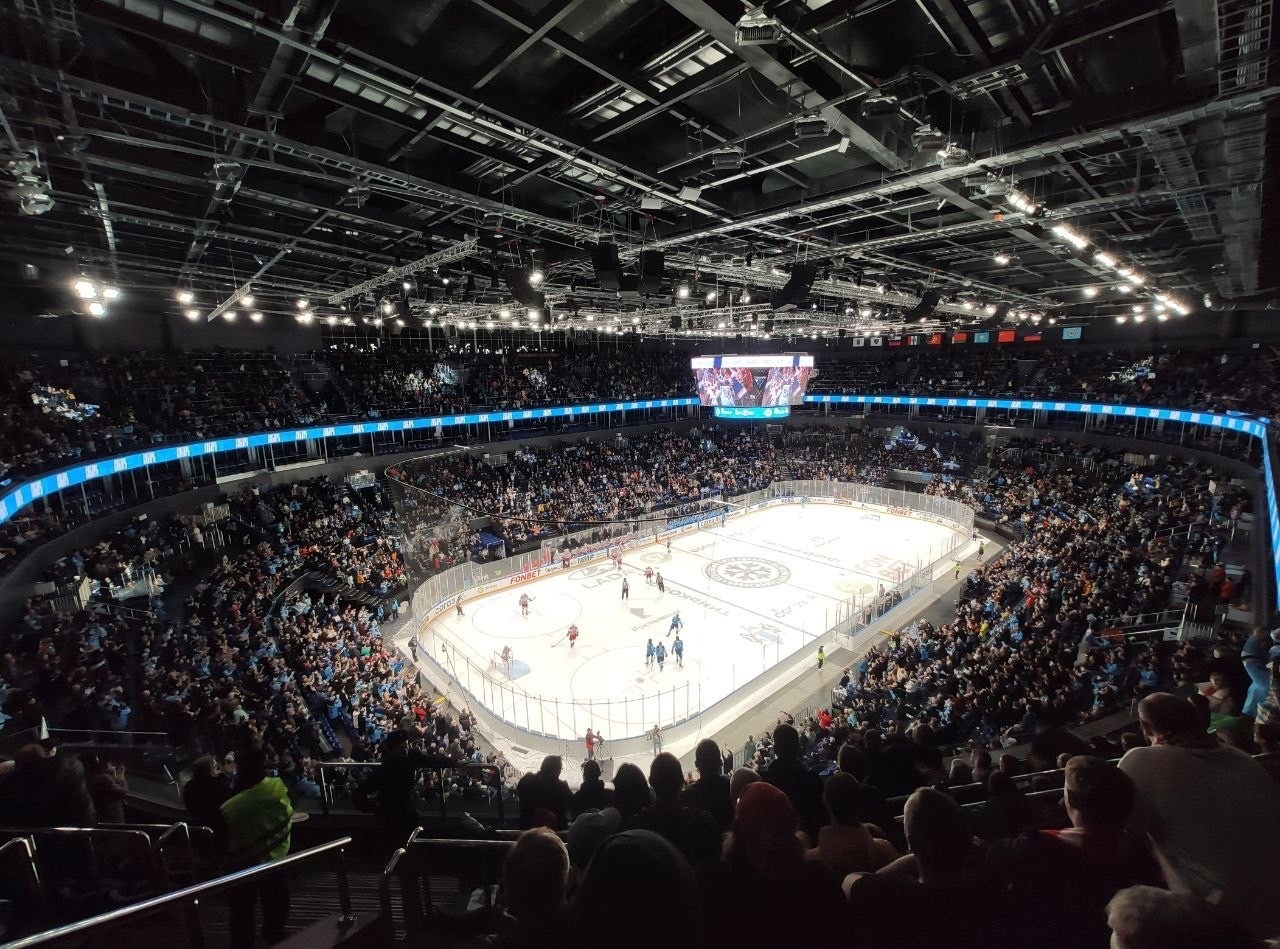
- Interactive map of Sibir Arena
- Location: 160, Nemirovich-Danchenko St. Novosibirsk 630005; Russia
- Coordinates: 54°59′39″N 82°55′39″E
- Elevation: 38 m (125 ft): (Floor count; 6)
- Owner: Government of the Novosibirsk region
- Operator: GAU NSO Arena
- Capacity: 11,650
- Record attendance: 11,600
- Field size: 60×26 m
- Acreage: 72,173.3 sq.m

Construction
- Groundbreaking: 2019
- Built: 2019; 2022
- Opened: 13 August 2023; 3 years ago
- Cost: ₽ 17,2 billion (€ 181 million in 2022)
- Architects: D. Bush, A. Orlov, A. Kontsalaev, E. Buzmakova, A. Zolotova, E. Puzanova, Y. Vinova, E. Korobkoi, A. Tsyplakov, S. Korobkov, I. Morozov (Arena Design Institute)
- Structural engineers: A. Ivashchenko, A. Ledenev, M. Kislov, A. Ivanov, A. Ustavitsky, M. Evstratova, E. Polyakova (Arena Design Institute)
- General contractor: ElinAlfa

Tenants
- HC Sibir Novosibirsk (KHL) (2023–present); Sibirskie Snaypery (MHL) (2023–present)

Website
- Official website

Sibir Arena (Russian: Сибирь Арена) Is an indoor ice hockey arena in Novosibirsk, Russia. Opened in 2023 with a capacity of 10,634, it is the home arena of HC Sibir Novosibirsk of the Kontinental Hockey League and Sibirskie Snaypery of the Minor Hockey League.

== History ==
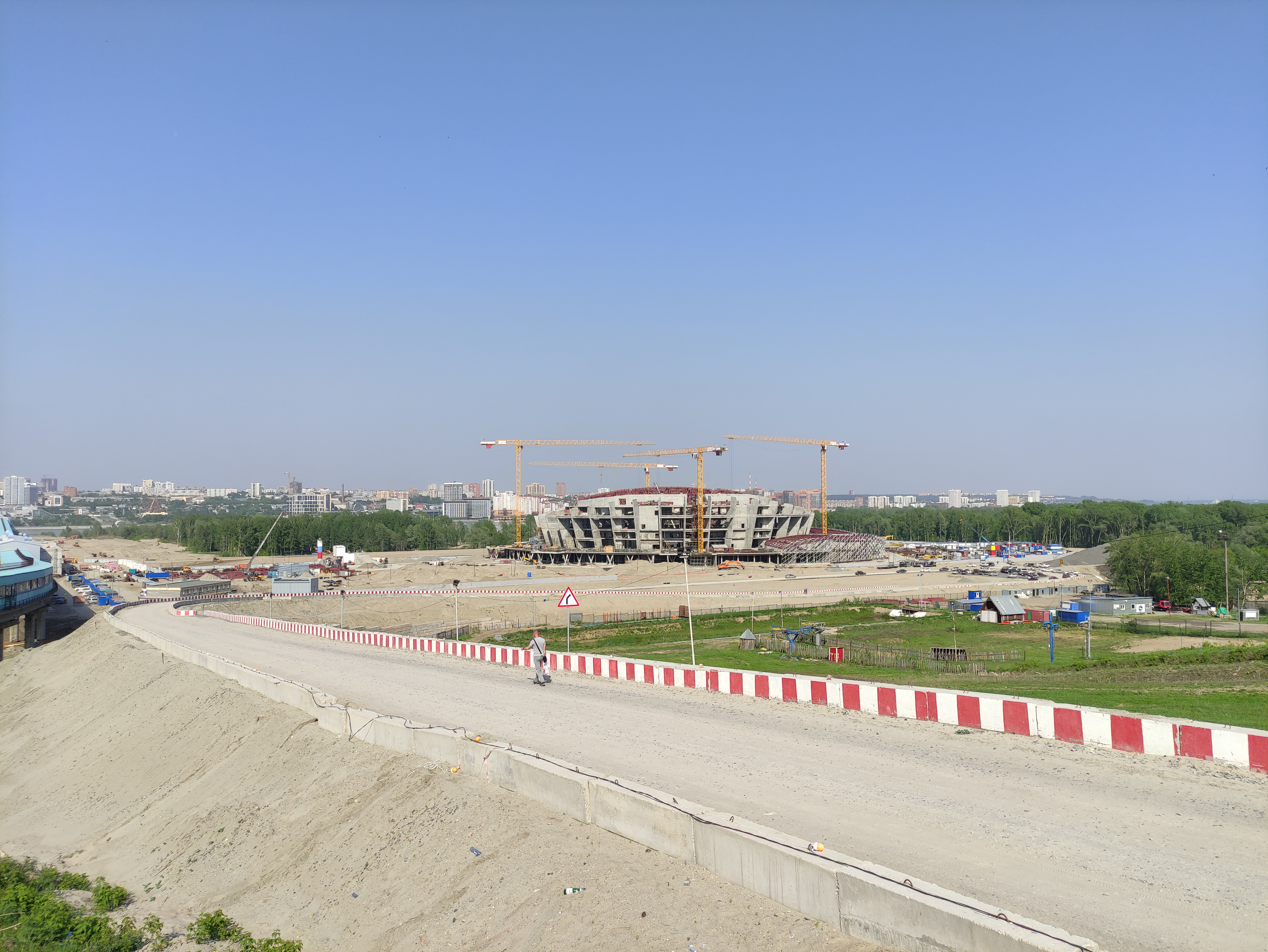
Sibir Arena under construction (May 2021)

In 2018, the IIHF announced that both Novosibirsk and the city of Omsk would host the 2023 IIHF World Junior Championship and as a result of this, both KHL teams in both cities would build new, modern stadiums to host the games. Construction of the new arena began in August 2019 and was originally slated to be finished by September 2022, but was delayed and officially completed in December of that same year. The first event to be held at the arena was supposed to be held on February 21, 2023, with a tournament between the local law enforcement agencies during the Defender of the Fatherland Day holiday, but it was ultimately canceled, and the day was used to test the equipment in the arena.

On August 13, 2023, the arena officially opened and hosted a game between the Russia men's national under-18 ice hockey team and the Belarus men's national under-18 ice hockey team, as well as a concert from Russian DJ DJ Smash and Belarusian singer Jeanet. After 59 years at the Ice Sports Palace Sibir, HC Sibir played their first game at the new arena on September 7, 2023, against Barys Astana. The game went to a shootout and Sibir's Taylor Beck scored the only goal, as they defeated Barys 1–0.

In the 2024-25 KHL season, HC Sibir drew the fourth-highest average home attendance with 10,694.

In February 2025, the arena hosted the KHL All-Star Game, before which its capacity was increased to 11,650 seats.

== Gallery ==
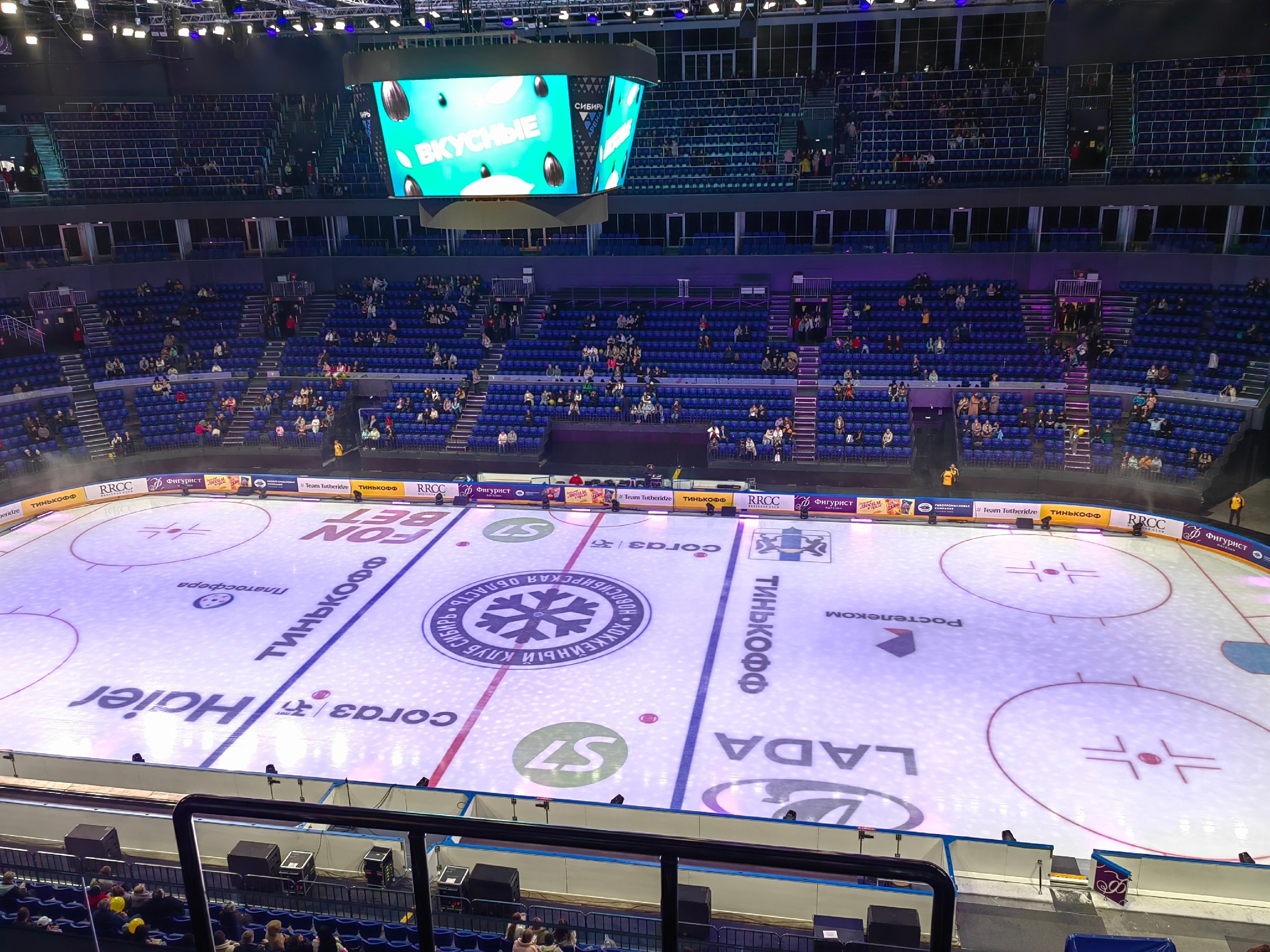
April 2, 2024

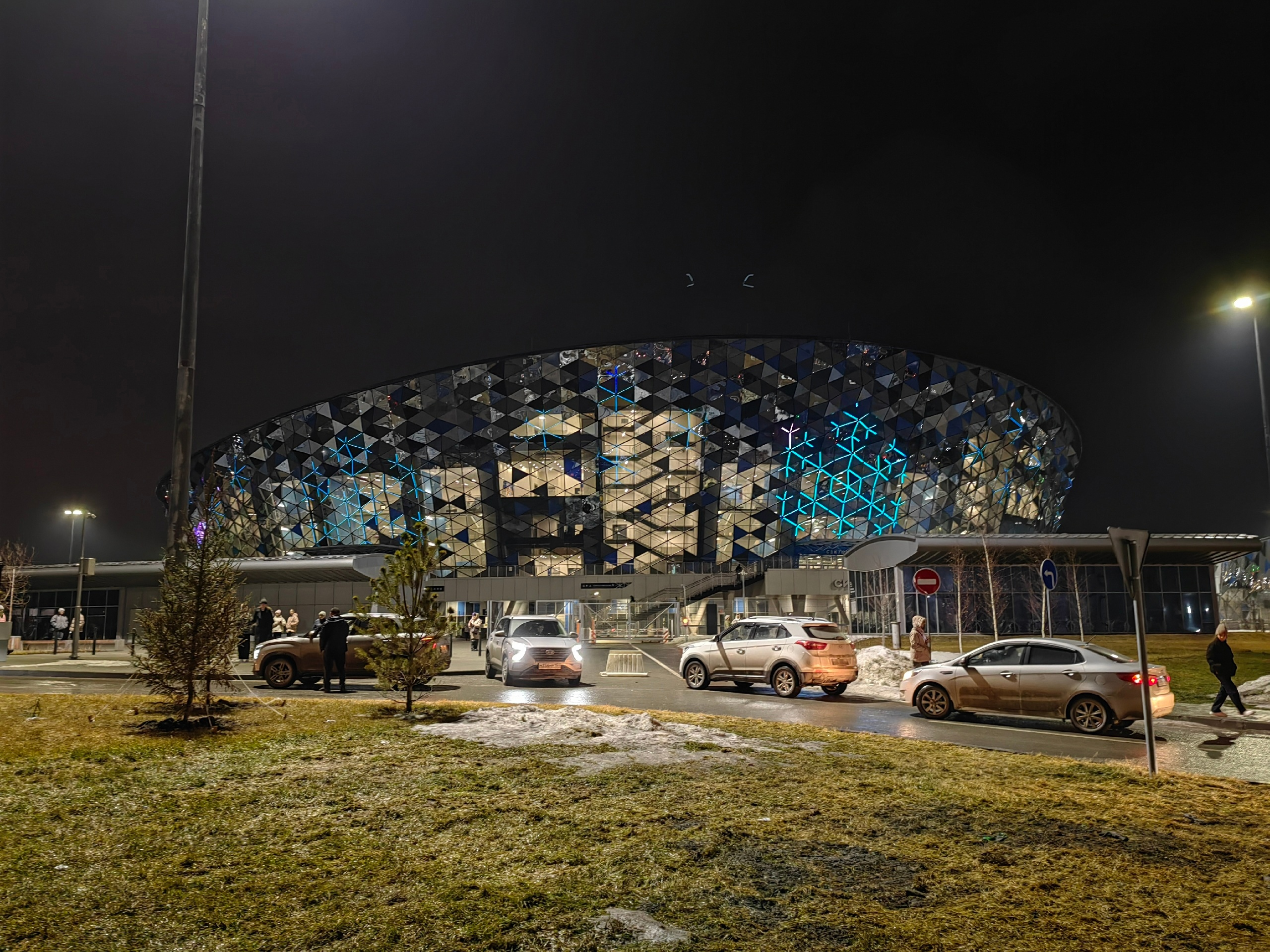
April 2, 2024

== See also ==
- List of indoor arenas in Russia
- List of European ice hockey arenas
