= Sibirskie Snaipery =

Sibirskie Snaipery Siberian Snipers
- City: Novosibirsk, Russia
- League: Junior Hockey League
- Conference: Eastern
- Division: Silver
- Founded: 2009
- Home arena: Sibir Arena (capacity: 11,650)
- Colors
- Owner: Novosibirsk Oblast Administration
- General manager: Viktor Merkulov
- Head coach: Eduard Volkov
- Captain: Matvey Nenakhov
- Affiliates: Sibir Novosibirsk (KHL); Dynamo-Altay (VHL)
- Website: snipers.hcsibir.ru

Franchise history
- 1993–2009: Sibir-2
- 2009–present: Sibirskie Snaipery

The Siberian Snipers or Hockey Team Sibirskie Snaypery (Russian: Хоккейная команда Сибирские Снайперы) is a junior ice hockey team from Novosibirsk, which contains players from the HC Sibir Novosibirsk school. They are members of the Russian Junior Hockey League, the top tier of junior hockey in the country.

== Name ==
The MHL club's name must not be the same as their affiliated Kontinental Hockey League club's name. So the former name of the team, Sibir-2, was changed. There were some variants for the junior club's new name. Fans were invited to vote for either Siberian Foxes, Siberian or Siberian Snipers, but the club's board decided to name the club Siberian Snipers.

== NHL Alumni ==
- Vladimir Tarasenko
- Nikita Zaitsev
