= Nadezhda Cup =

- Sport: Ice hockey
- Awarded for: Team winning the tournament for teams that failed to qualify for the Gagarin Cup playoffs of the Kontinental Hockey League

History
- First award: 2013
- Most recent: (Russia) Avangard Omsk

The Nadezhda Cup (Russian: Кубок Надежды; English: Hope Cup) is a trophy in the Kontinental Hockey League that was first awarded during the 2012-13 KHL season.

Participants in the Nadezhda Cup are all KHL teams that did not qualify for the Gagarin Cup playoffs.

== Winners ==
Season	Champion	Runner-up	Series
2012–13	(Latvia) Dinamo Riga	(Russia) Amur Khabarovsk	3–1
2013–14	(Russia) Avangard Omsk	(Belarus) Dinamo Minsk	3–0
2014–15	Not contested – cancelled		

== See also ==
- Continental Cup
- Gagarin Cup
- Opening Cup
