= Alexei Ponikarovsky =

Ukrainian-Canadian ice hockey player (born 1980)

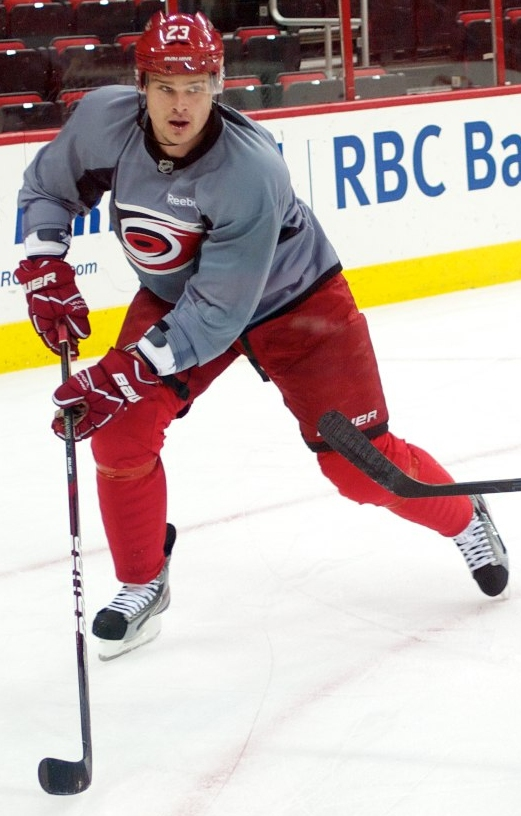
- Ponikarovsky with the Carolina Hurricanes in 2012
- Born: 9 April 1980 (age 46) Kyiv, Ukrainian SSR, Soviet Union
- Height: 6 ft 4 in (193 cm)
- Weight: 220 lb (100 kg; 15 st 10 lb)
- Position: Left wing
- Shot: Left
- Played for: Krylya Sovetov; Dynamo Moscow; Toronto Maple Leafs; Khimik Voskresensk; Pittsburgh Penguins; Los Angeles Kings; Carolina Hurricanes; New Jersey Devils; Donbass Donetsk; Winnipeg Jets; SKA Saint Petersburg; Kunlun Red Star
- National team: Ukraine
- NHL draft: 87th overall, 1998; Toronto Maple Leafs
- Playing career: 1998–2018

Alexei Ponikarovsky (Ukrainian: Олексій Володимирович Понікаровський, Oleksiy Volodymyrovych Ponikarovskyi; born 9 April 1980) is a Ukrainian–Canadian former professional ice hockey left winger. He played in the National Hockey League (NHL) for the Toronto Maple Leafs, Pittsburgh Penguins, Los Angeles Kings, Carolina Hurricanes, New Jersey Devils and Winnipeg Jets, having originally been drafted in the third round, 87th overall, by the Maple Leafs at the 1998 NHL entry draft. He also holds Russian citizenship.

== Playing career ==
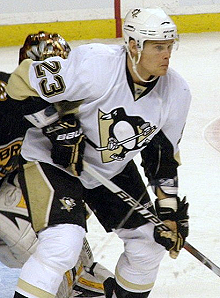
Ponikarovsky with the Penguins

As a youth, Ponikarovsky played in the 1994 Quebec International Pee-Wee Hockey Tournament with a team from Kyiv.

Ponikarovsky began his career with the Dynamo Moscow organization, playing with the team's affiliates, Dynamo-2 and Dynamo Jr., from 1995 to 1999 campaigns, seeing a little action with the main club during the 1998–99 season before becoming a regular fixture on the team during the 1999–2000 season when Dynamo won the Russian Superleague (RSL) championship.

In 1997–98, Ponikarovsky played 24 games for Dynamo in the First Division of the Russian Hockey League, collecting three points. He then played 13 games for Krylya Sovetov of the Russian Elite League in 1998–99 and played three playoff games for Dynamo.

In 1999–2000, Ponikarovsky played 19 games for Dynamo of the Russian Elite League and played 29 games for THK Tver in the First Division of the Russian Hockey League, collecting 22 points (eight goals and 14 assists).

In the 2005–06 season, Ponikarovsky put up career-highs in goals, assists, points and penalty minutes. He saw added responsibility and was given more ice-time, often with former Dynamo Moscow teammate Nik Antropov or Mats Sundin, and became one of the team's regular penalty-killers. Ponikarovsky finished the season with four shorthanded goals and one assist. His four shorthanded goals tied ten players, including teammate Matt Stajan, for eighth in the NHL.

On 16 December 2006, Ponikarovsky notched a career-high five points in Toronto's 9–2 victory over the New York Rangers, scoring two goals and assisting on three others. He was commonly referred to by his teammates as "The Poni Express", "The Ukraine Train" or simply "Poni". On 10 May 2007, the Maple Leafs re-signed Ponikarovsky to a three-year, $6.315 million contract extension.

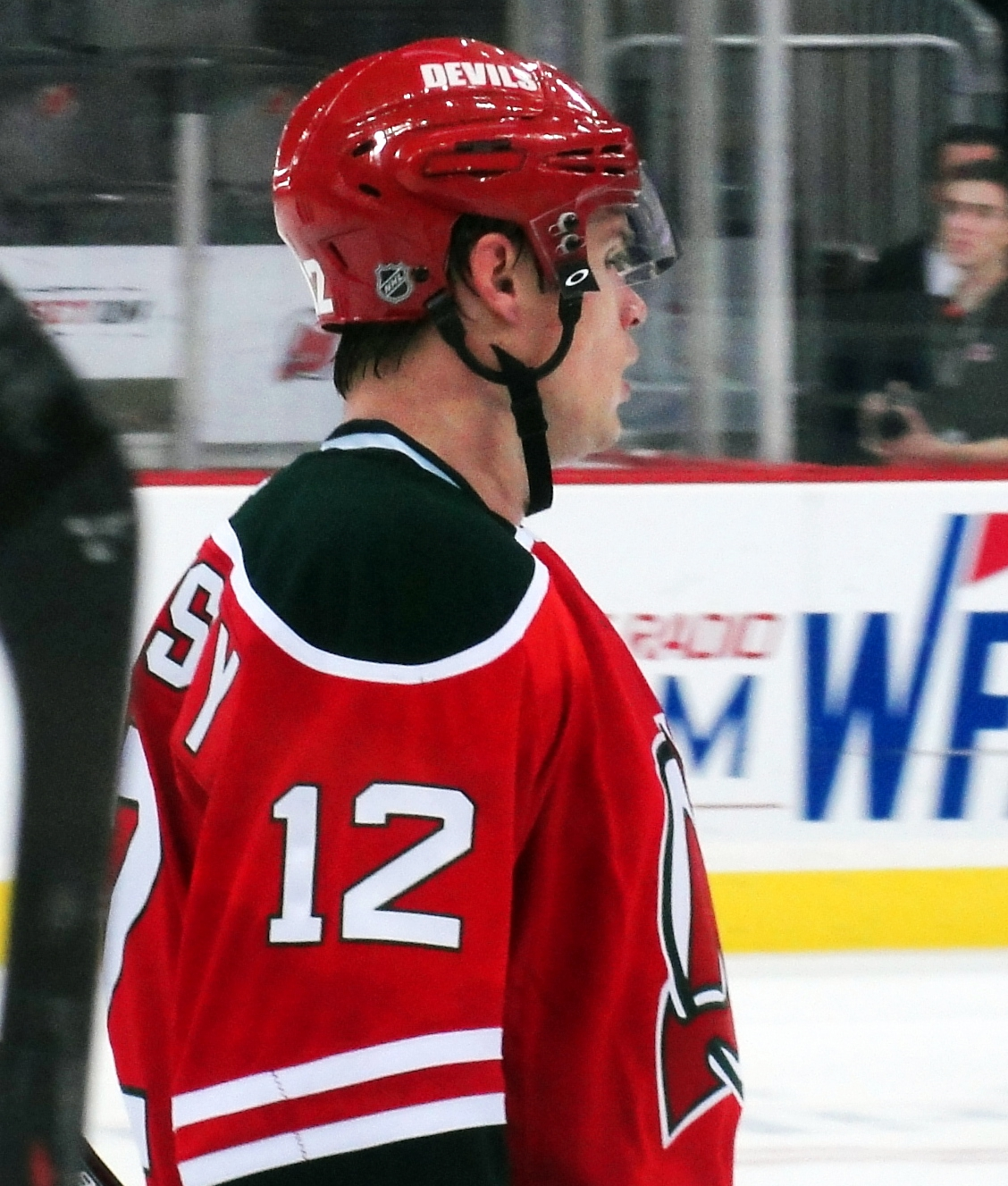
Ponikarovsky with the Devils

On 2 March 2010, Ponikarovsky was traded to the Pittsburgh Penguins in exchange for Luca Caputi and Martin Škoula. Following the trade, he remained optimistic he would resume contract talks with Toronto in the off-season. In his debut game with the Penguins on 6 March 2010, against the Dallas Stars, he scored his first goal with his new team.

On 27 July 2010, Ponikarovsky signed with the Los Angeles Kings, receiving a signing bonus of $200,000 and a one-year contract for $3 million.

On 1 July 2011, Ponikarovsky signed a one-year contract with the Carolina Hurricanes reportedly worth $1.5 million.

On January 20, 2012, Ponikarovsky was traded to the New Jersey Devils in exchange for defenceman Joe Sova and a fourth-round pick in 2012. In 33 games, he scored 18 points before helping the Devils to the 2012 Stanley Cup Final, scoring an overtime game winner in Game 3 of the Eastern Conference Semifinals against the Philadelphia Flyers.

On July 1, 2012, Ponikarovsky signed as a free agent with the Winnipeg Jets on a one-year, $1.8 million contract. However, due to the 2012–13 NHL lockout, Ponikarovsky signed a temporary contract with the Ukrainian Kontinental Hockey League (KHL) club HC Donbass for the 2012–13 season. In Donetsk, he had scored 18 points in 32 games, after which he returned to start the shortened NHL season with the Jets. After scoring only 2 goals in 12 games, Ponikarovsky was traded back to the New Jersey Devils in exchange for fourth- and seventh-round picks in the 2014 NHL entry draft on 13 February 2013.

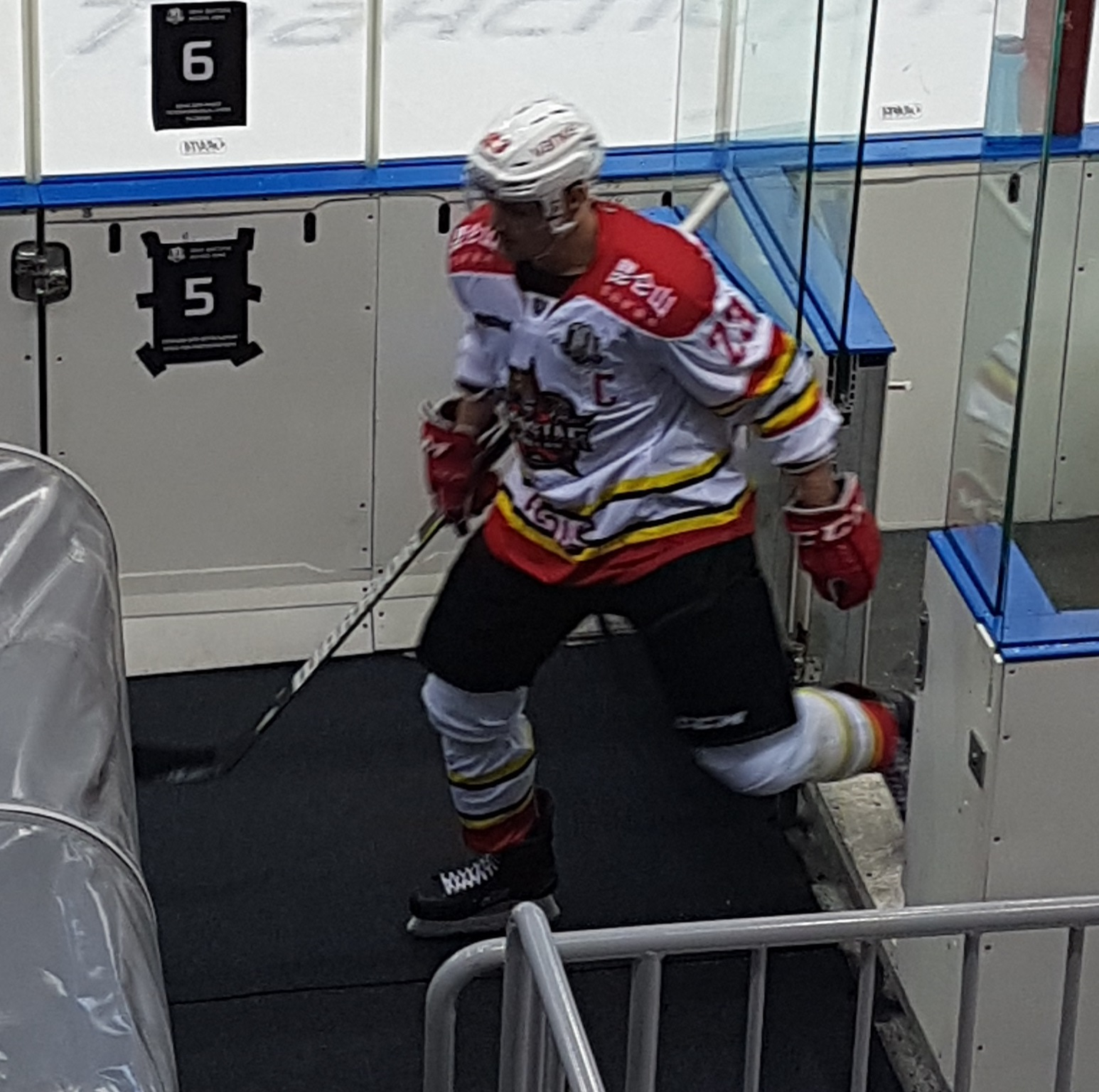
Ponikarovsky with Kunlun Red Star in 2017

Upon the conclusion of the 2012–13 season, with limited NHL interest in free agency, Ponikarovsky decided to return to the KHL, signing a two-year contract with SKA Saint Petersburg on 5 August 2013. The move reunited him with former New Jersey Devils teammate Ilya Kovalchuk, who also just signed with SKA.

== Personal life ==
On 7 June 2007, Ponikarovsky became a Canadian citizen during a ceremony in Etobicoke, Ontario. Ponikarovsky lives in Miami with his wife Inna, daughter Jessica, and sons Alex and Maxim, while still owning a house in Toronto. He has favoured wearing the number 23 as two of his grandparents were born on the 23rd, along with his wife. After signing with SKA Saint Petersburg, Ponikarovsky obtained additional Russian citizenship, as many Ukrainians in the KHL do.

== Career statistics ==
=== Regular season and playoffs ===
			Regular season					Playoffs
Season	Team	League	GP	G	A	Pts	PIM	GP	G	A	Pts	PIM
1996–97	Dynamo Moscow II	RUS III	2	0	0	0	2	—	—	—	—	—
1997–98	Dynamo Moscow II	RUS II	24	1	2	3	30	—	—	—	—	—
1998–99	Dynamo Moscow II	RUS II	28	12	3	15	32	—	—	—	—	—
1998–99	Krylya Sovetov Moscow	RSL	13	2	1	3	2	—	—	—	—	—
1999–2000	THK Tver	RUS II	29	8	14	22	26	—	—	—	—	—
1999–2000	Dynamo Moscow	RSL	19	1	0	1	8	1	0	0	0	0
2000–01	Toronto Maple Leafs	NHL	22	1	3	4	14	—	—	—	—	—
2000–01	St. John's Maple Leafs	AHL	49	12	24	36	44	4	0	0	0	4
2001–02	St. John's Maple Leafs	AHL	72	21	27	48	19	5	2	1	3	8
2001–02	Toronto Maple Leafs	NHL	8	2	0	2	0	10	0	0	0	4
2002–03	St. John's Maple Leafs	AHL	63	24	22	46	68	—	—	—	—	—
2002–03	Toronto Maple Leafs	NHL	13	0	3	3	11	—	—	—	—	—
2003–04	Toronto Maple Leafs	NHL	73	9	19	28	44	13	1	3	4	8
2004–05	Khimik Voskresensk	RSL	19	1	5	6	16	—	—	—	—	—
2005–06	Toronto Maple Leafs	NHL	81	21	17	38	68	—	—	—	—	—
2006–07	Toronto Maple Leafs	NHL	71	21	24	45	63	—	—	—	—	—
2007–08	Toronto Maple Leafs	NHL	66	18	17	35	36	—	—	—	—	—
2008–09	Toronto Maple Leafs	NHL	82	23	38	61	38	—	—	—	—	—
2009–10	Toronto Maple Leafs	NHL	61	19	22	41	44	—	—	—	—	—
2009–10	Pittsburgh Penguins	NHL	16	2	7	9	17	11	1	4	5	4
2010–11	Los Angeles Kings	NHL	61	5	10	15	36	4	1	0	1	0
2011–12	Carolina Hurricanes	NHL	49	7	8	15	26	—	—	—	—	—
2011–12	New Jersey Devils	NHL	33	7	11	18	8	24	1	8	9	12
2012–13	Donbass Donetsk	KHL	32	5	13	18	16	—	—	—	—	—
2012–13	Winnipeg Jets	NHL	12	2	0	2	6	—	—	—	—	—
2012–13	New Jersey Devils	NHL	30	2	5	7	8	—	—	—	—	—
2013–14	SKA Saint Petersburg	KHL	51	6	9	15	38	10	1	1	2	4
2014–15	SKA Saint Petersburg	KHL	32	2	6	8	24	9	1	0	1	4
2015–16	SKA Saint Petersburg	KHL	40	3	1	4	30	3	0	0	0	0
2016–17	Kunlun Red Star	KHL	52	7	7	14	34	5	0	1	1	0
2017–18	Kunlun Red Star	KHL	51	6	7	13	20	—	—	—	—	—
NHL totals			678	139	184	323	419	52	4	15	19	28
AHL totals			184	57	73	130	186	9	2	1	3	12
KHL totals			256	29	43	72	162	27	2	2	4	8

=== International ===
Year	Team	Event	Result	GP	G	A	Pts	PIM
2002	Ukraine	OG	10th	4	1	1	2	6
2013	Ukraine	OGQ	DNQ	3	2	3	5	0
Senior totals				7	3	4	7	6

Sporting positions
Preceded by Janne Jalasvaara	Kunlun Red Star captain 2017–18	Succeeded by Brandon Yip
