= List of Ukrainians in the Kontinental Hockey League =

For the 2014–15 season, Ukrainians constituted the 14th most numerous nationality within the Kontinental Hockey League (KHL). During the 2009–10 KHL season, 26^{[a]} Ukrainian players participated in the competition, the most to date, out of the 41 total to have played. Alexei Zhitnik, along with Anton Babchuk and Nikolay Zherdev are of a select few to have been named to the annual All Star Game.

Oleg Tverdovsky became the first Ukrainian-born player to win the Gagarin Cup, doing so with HC Salavat Yulaev in 2010. In 2013, Kostiantyn Kasianchuk became the first Ukrainian national team player to do the same; after which the Cup was brought to Kyiv in celebration. According to Sokil Kyiv general manager Vyacheslav Zavalnyuk, 13.5% of all players in the KHL have Ukrainian roots.

== Players ==
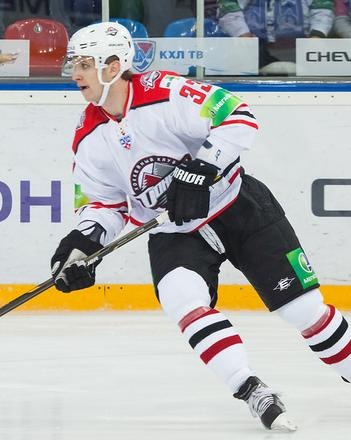
Anton Babchuk playing for HC Donbass in 2012

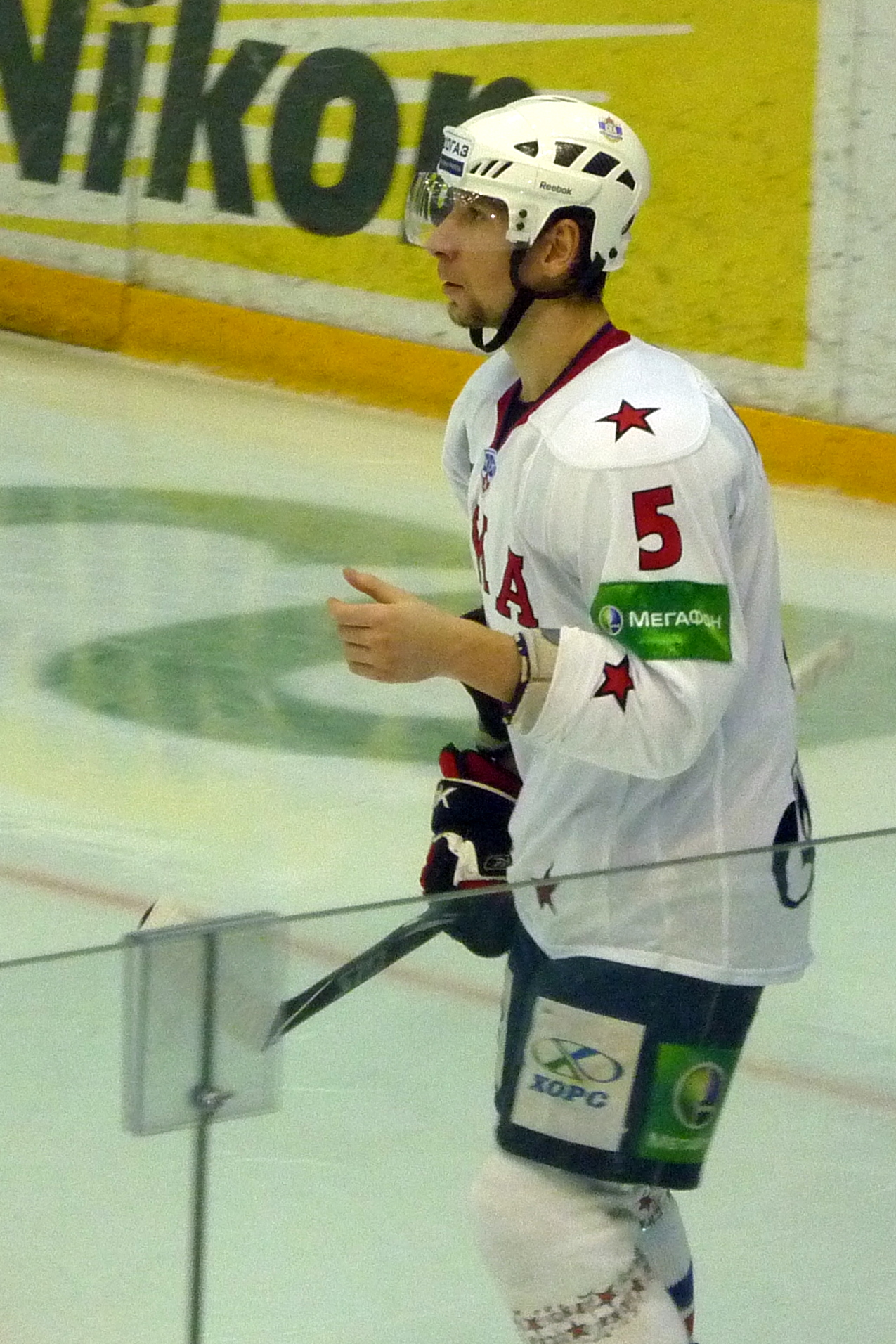
Vitaly Vishnevsky has played the most games of any Ukrainian in the KHL

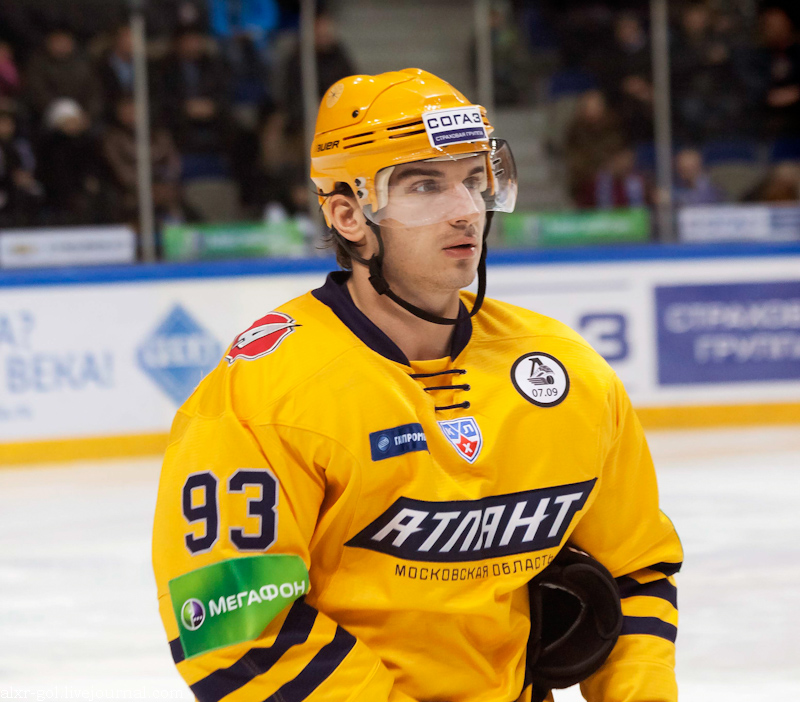
Nikolay Zherdev playing for Atlant

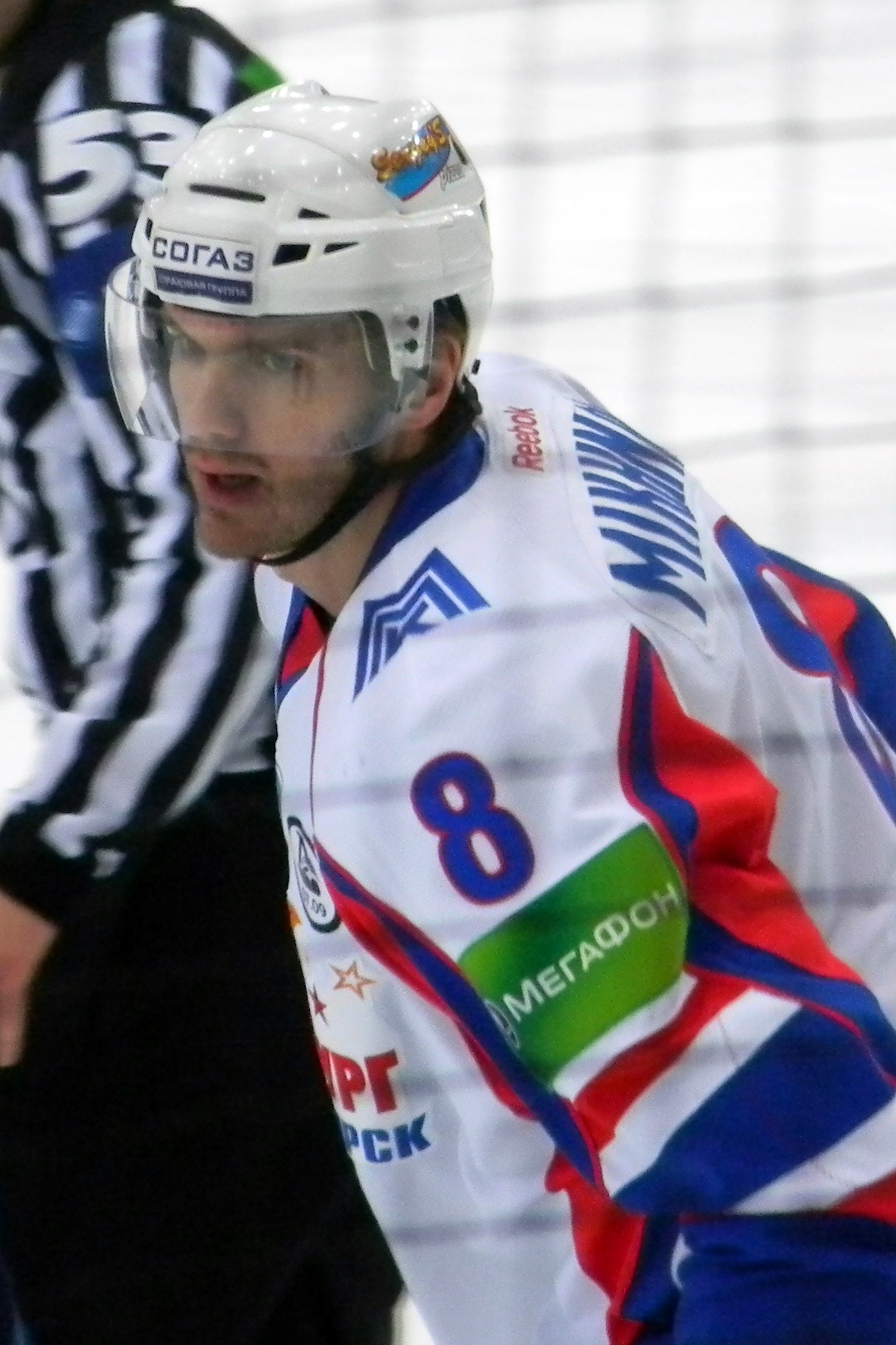
Alexei Mikhnov playing for Metallurg Magnitogorsk in 2012

= Active in 2012-13 season	= Signed for 2013-14 season	= Active in 2013-14 season	= Retired

NAT	Name	POS	GP	G	A	PTS	Birthplace	Team	Ref.
(Ukraine)	Viktor Andrushenko	F	59	3	11	14	Kyiv	(Belarus)	
(Russia)	Vitali Anikeyenko^{[☦]}	D	144	14	35	49	Kyiv	-	
(Russia)	Anton Babchuk ★	D	80	10	15	25	Kyiv	Salavat Yulaev	
(Ukraine)	Denis Bayev	D	156	9	15	24	Konotop	(VHL)	
Russians in Ukraine	Yevgeni Belukhin	F	0	0	0	0	Arzamas-16	Donbass	
Russians in Ukraine	Dmytriy Berezin	G	1	-	-	-	Novosibirsk	Unsigned	
(Ukraine)	Roman Blahoi	F	0	0	0	0	Kyiv	Donbass	
(Russia)	Anton But	LW	249	66	82	148	Kharkiv	Unsigned	
(Russia)	Denis Denisov	D	250	32	63	95	Kharkiv	CSKA	^{[b]}
(Ukraine)	Vitali Donika	C	15	0	1	1	Kyiv	(VHL)	
(Ukraine)	Ruslan Fedotenko	LW	33	8	10	18	Kyiv	Donbass	
(Ukraine)	Serhiy Haiduchenko	G	78	-	-	-	Kyiv	Donbass	
(Ukraine)	Kostiantyn Kasianchuk	F	170	29	35	64	Kyiv	Dynamo	
(Ukraine)	Serhiy Klymentiev	D	39	2	4	6	Kyiv	-	
(Russia)	Alexander Komaristy	C	176	19	37	56	Severodonetsk	Neftekhimik	
(Ukraine)	Maxim Kvitchenko	F	25	0	1	1	Kyiv	Donbass	
(Ukraine)	Vitaliy Liutkevych	D	20	0	1	1	Kyiv	(VHL)	
(Ukraine)	Oleksandr Materukhin	LW	7	0	0	0	Kyiv	Dinamo-Minsk	
(Russia)	Alexei Mikhnov	LW	200	45	61	106	Kyiv	Atlant	
(Ukraine)	Andriy Mikhnov	LW	109	10	12	22	Kyiv	(Belarus)	
Russians in Ukraine	Yegor Morozov	F	0	0	0	0	^{[✪]}Tolyatti	Donbass	
(Ukraine)	Artem Ostroushko	D	51	5	8	13	Kyiv	-	
(Ukraine)	Denis Petrukhno	D	0	0	0	0	Kyiv	Donbass	
(Kazakhstan)	Fedor Polischuk	LW	221	20	48	68	Kolodyste	Barys	
(Ukraine)	Alexei Ponikarovsky	LW	32	5	13	18	Kyiv	Kunlun	
(Ukraine)	Gennady Razin	D	237	9	29	38	Kharkiv	Donbass	
(Russia)	Andrei Sergeyev	D	104	4	9	13	Simferopol	Spartak	
(Ukraine)	Oleh Shafarenko	F	21	2	4	6	Kyiv	(Belarus)	
(Ukraine)	Vadym Shakhraychuk	C	103	15	12	17	Kyiv	Unsigned	
Russians in Ukraine	Vladislav Shalimov	RW	3	0	0	0	Belovo	Donbass	
(Russia)	Egor Shastin	F	141	34	42	76	Kyiv	(Swiss)	
(Ukraine)	Mykhailo Shevchuk	G	0	-	-	-	Kharkiv	Donbass	
(Russia)	Denis Shvidki	RW	37	3	4	7	Kharkiv	(MOL Liga)	
(Ukraine)	Dmytro Shvidenko	D	0	0	0	0	Lubny	Ugra	
Russians in Ukraine	Yuri Silnitsky	D	16	0	0	0	Tyumen	Donbass	
(Ukraine)	Kostiantyn Simchuk	G	13	-	-	-	Kyiv	-	
(Russia)	Daniil Sobchenko^{[☦]}	C	51	6	2	8	Kyiv	-	
(Belarus)	Alexei Strakhov	RW	25	3	3	6	Kharkiv	-	
(Russia)	Volodymyr Tkachev	D	5	0	0	0	Dnipropetrovsk	Ak Bars	
(Ukraine)	Oleksandr Toryanik	RW	0	0	0	0	Kharkiv	Donbass	
(Russia)	Oleg Tverdovsky	D	191	29	51	80	Donetsk	-	
(Ukraine)	Serhiy Varlamov	LW	133	24	26	50	Kyiv	Donbass	
(Russia)	Vitaly Vishnevsky	D	263	25	44	69	Kharkiv	Lokomotiv	
Russians in Ukraine	Alexander Vyukhin^{[☦]}	G	87	-	-	-	Sverdlovsk	-	
(Ukraine)	Viktor Zakharov	F	0	0	0	0	Kyiv	Donbass	
(Russia)	Ignat Zemchenko	C	80	9	7	16	Kyiv	Severstal	
(Russia)	Nikolay Zherdev ★	RW	155	44	78	122	Kyiv	Severstal	
(Russia)	Alexei Zhitnik ★	D	112	4	14	18	Kyiv	-	

Note: A (★) denotes a player who has participated in an All Star Game
All statistics accurate to the end of the 2012–13 KHL season

=== Breakdown of players by nationality ===
- Ukraine
- Nationalized to Ukraine
- Russia
- Kazakhstan
- Belarus
- Neutral

=== Captains ===
Several players have acted as captains of their respective KHL clubs, including: Alexei Zhitnik (Dynamo Moscow); Vitaly Vishnevsky (SKA); Serhiy Varlamov, Ruslan Fedotenko, (HC Donbass); and Nikolay Zherdev (Atlant)

== Players of Ukrainian descent ==
The following is a list of KHL players who while not born in Ukraine, are of documented Ukrainian descent.

- Mikhail Anisin
- Alexander Eremenko
- Shaun Heshka
- Andrei Nikolishin

== Notes ==
- ^{a} Figure includes both Ukrainian-born and Ukrainian national players.
- ^{b} Denis Denisov was born in Kharkiv, Ukrainian SSR to a military family who relocated to Tver prior to Ukraine's independence. As a result, he never was a Ukrainian citizen.
- ^{c} Yuri Silnitsky and Vladislav Shalimov played in the 2012–13 season, but did not gain Ukrainian citizenship until the following year.
- Indicates a player who was born in Russia and became a naturalized Ukrainian citizen
- ^{☦} Vitaly Anikeyenko, Daniil Sobchenko, and Alexander Vyukhin were killed in the 2011 Lokomotiv Yaroslavl plane crash prior to the opening game of the 2011–12 KHL season.
