= Kontinental Hockey League Players' Trade Union =

- Founded: 2009
- Headquarters: Nizhny Novgorod
- Location: Russia
- Key people: Artem Bazhenov, Chairman
- Website: [khlptu.ru/]

The Kontinental Hockey League Players' Trade Union is the trade union of the professional ice hockey players who are under contract to any team in the Kontinental Hockey League. Headquartered in Nizhny Novgorod, Russia, it was founded in 2009 when the Russian Superleague gave way to the KHL.
