= Opening Cup =

Kontinental Hockey League trophy

- Sport: Ice hockey
- Awarded for: Team winning the first game of the regular season of the Kontinental Hockey League

History
- First award: 2008
- Most recent: (Russia) CSKA Moscow

The Opening Cup (Russian: Кубок Открытия, Kubok Otkrytiya) is the trophy awarded to the winner of the first game of every regular season of the Kontinental Hockey League (KHL). This match is played between the previous season's playoff champion (Gagarin Cup Winner) and the previous season's Continental Cup winner. The game is played on the home ice of the previous season's playoff champion.

== History ==
During the first season of the KHL, the match was played between the winner and runner-up of the 2007–08 playoffs of the Russian Superleague.

The Western Conference in the 2010 Opening Cup game was represented by UHC Dynamo because the 2009–10 Western Conference champion, HC MVD, merged with Dynamo Moscow to form the new team after the 2009–10 season. On September 10, 2011, three days after the 2011 Lokomotiv Yaroslavl plane crash disaster, the KHL head office decided to honor the deceased in the 2011 Opening Cup.

== Winners ==
Key to colors
W	Western Conference member
E	Eastern Conference member
N/A	N/A, KHL conferences established during the second season of competition

Season	Match date	Previous season Gagarin Cup Winner		Previous season Continental Cup Winner		Result	Venue	Ref
2008–09	2 September 2008	N/A	Salavat Yulaev Ufa	N/A	Lokomotiv Yaroslavl	4–1	(Russia) Ufa Arena, Ufa	
2009–10	10 September 2009	E	Ak Bars Kazan	W	Lokomotiv Yaroslavl	3–2 (OT)	(Russia) TatNeft Arena, Kazan	
2010–11	8 September 2010	E	Ak Bars Kazan	W	Dynamo Moscow	1–3	(Russia) TatNeft Arena, Kazan	
2011–12	12 September 2011	E	Salavat Yulaev Ufa	W	Atlant Moscow Oblast	5–3	(Russia) Ufa Arena, Ufa	
2012–13	4 September 2012	W	Dynamo Moscow	E	Avangard Omsk	3–2 (SO)	(Russia) Megasport Arena, Moscow	
2013–14	4 September 2013	W	Dynamo Moscow	E	Traktor Chelyabinsk	5–1	(Russia) Minor Arena Luzhniki, Moscow	
2014–15	3 September 2014	E	Metallurg Magnitogorsk	W	Dynamo Moscow	6–1	(Russia) Arena Metallurg, Magnitogorsk	
2015–16	24 August 2015	W	SKA Saint Petersburg	W	CSKA Moscow	3–4 (OT)	(Russia) Ice Palace, Saint Petersburg	
2016–17	22 August 2016	E	Metallurg Magnitogorsk	W	CSKA Moscow	3–2	(Russia) Arena Metallurg, Magnitogorsk	
2017–18	21 August 2017	W	SKA Saint Petersburg	W	CSKA Moscow	4–2	(Russia) Ice Palace, Saint Petersburg	
2018–19	1 September 2018	E	Ak Bars Kazan	W	SKA Saint Petersburg	1–6	(Russia) TatNeft Arena, Kazan	
2019–20	1 September 2019	W	CSKA Moscow	E	Avangard Omsk	1–3	(Russia) CSKA Arena, Moscow	
2020–21	2 September 2020	E	Ak Bars Kazan	W	CSKA Moscow	3–2 (OT)	(Russia) CSKA Arena, Moscow	
2021–22	1 September 2021	E	Avangard Omsk	W	CSKA Moscow	4–0	(Russia) Balashikha Arena, Balashikha	
2022–23	1 September 2022	W	CSKA Moscow	E	Metallurg Magnitogorsk	6–2	(Russia) CSKA Arena, Moscow	
2023–24	1 September 2023	W	CSKA Moscow	E	Ak Bars Kazan	2–5	(Russia) CSKA Arena, Moscow	
2024–25	3 September 2024	E	Metallurg Magnitogorsk	W	Lokomotiv Yaroslavl	2–3	(Russia) Arena Metallurg, Magnitogorsk	

== Appearances ==
Apps	Team	Wins	Losses	Win %
8	CSKA Moscow	2	6	.250
5	Ak Bars Kazan	3	2	.600
4	Dynamo Moscow	3	1	.750
3	SKA Saint Petersburg	2	1	.667
3	Avangard Omsk	2	1	.667
3	Metallurg Magnitogorsk	2	2	.500
3	Lokomotiv Yaroslavl	1	2	.333
2	Salavat Yulaev Ufa	2	0	1.000
1	Atlant Moscow Oblast	0	1	.000
1	Traktor Chelyabinsk	0	1	.000
