= Grigori Panin =

Russian ice hockey player (born 1985)

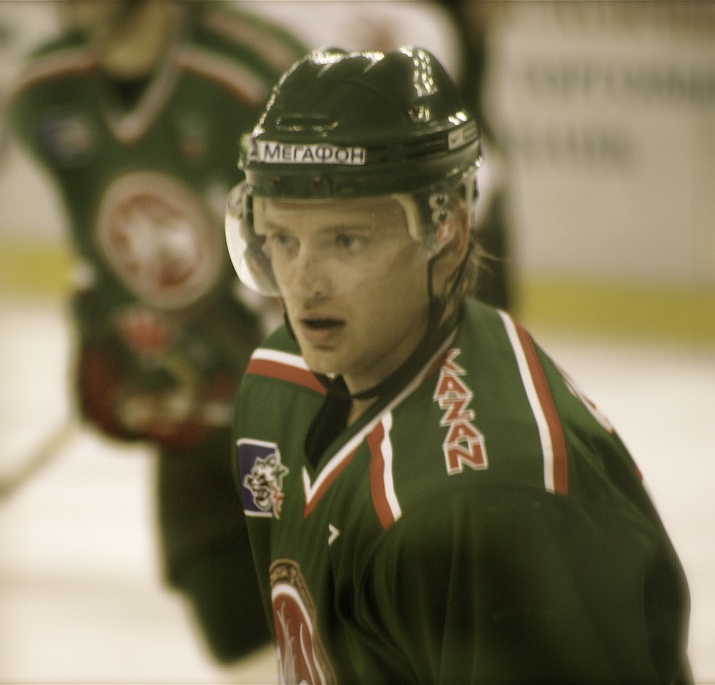
- Born: November 24, 1985 (age 40) Karaganda, Kazakh SSR, Soviet Union
- Height: 6 ft 0 in (183 cm)
- Weight: 196 lb (89 kg; 14 st 0 lb)
- Position: Defence
- Shoots: Left
- KHL team Former teams: Salavat Yulaev Ufa; Lada Togliatti; Ak Bars Kazan; CSKA Moscow
- Playing career: 2004–present

Grigori Panin (born November 24, 1985) is a Russian professional ice hockey defenceman who currently plays as captain for Salavat Yulaev Ufa in the Kontinental Hockey League (KHL).

== Playing career ==
Panin first played with Lada Togliatti before spending 8 seasons with Ak Bars Kazan of the KHL. On June 21, 2014, Panin signed a one-year contract as a free agent with CSKA Moscow.

After three seasons with CSKA Moscow, Panin as a free agent joined his fourth KHL club, Salavat Yulaev Ufa, on July 11, 2017.
