= Josh Leivo =

Canadian ice hockey player (born 1993)

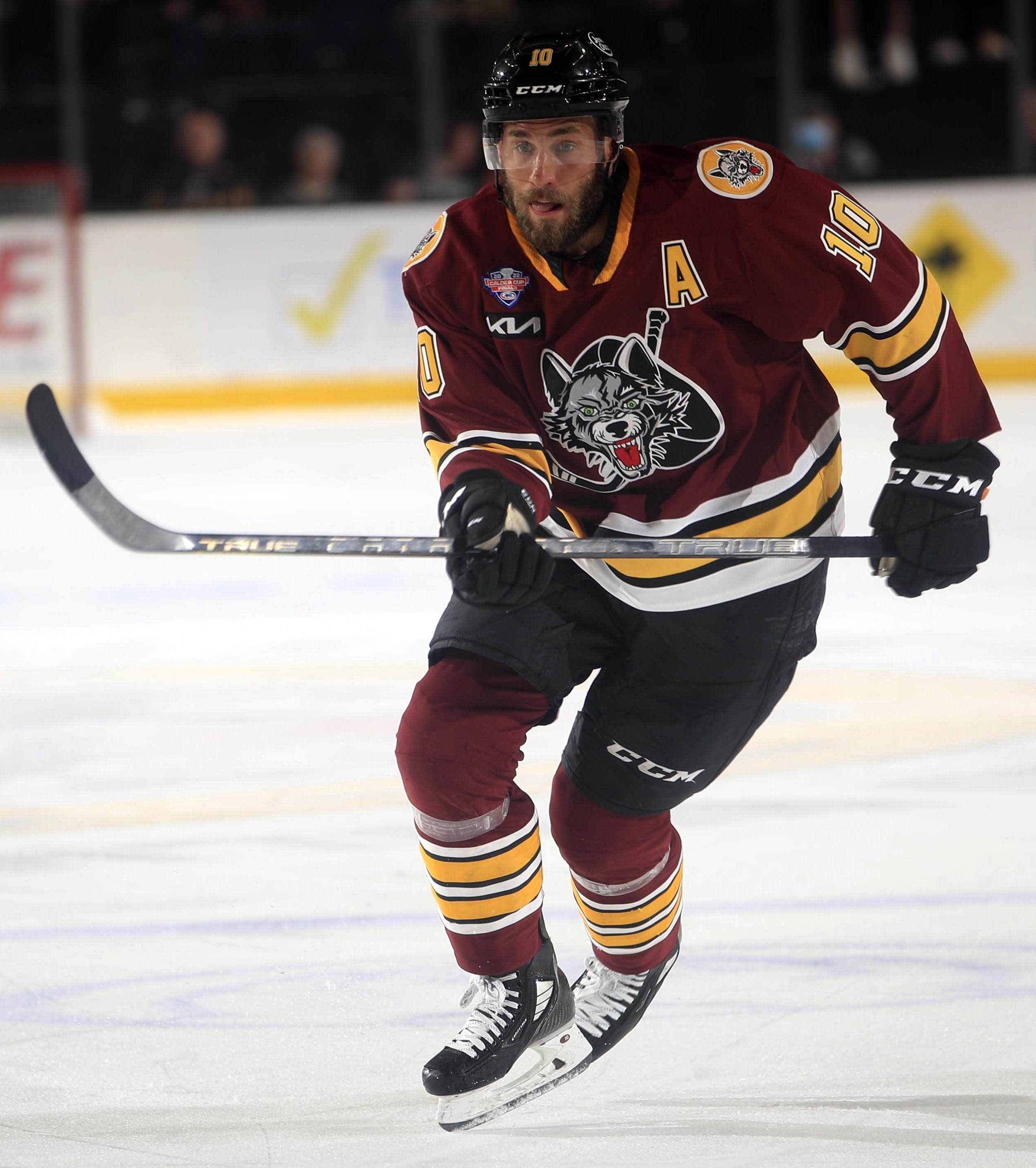
- Joshua Leivo with the Chicago Wolves in 2022
- Born: May 26, 1993 (age 33) Innisfil, Ontario, Canada
- Height: 6 ft 2 in (188 cm)
- Weight: 205 lb (93 kg; 14 st 9 lb)
- Position: Winger
- Shoots: Right
- KHL team Former teams: Avangard Omsk; Toronto Maple Leafs; Vancouver Canucks; Calgary Flames; Carolina Hurricanes; St. Louis Blues; Salavat Yulaev Ufa; Traktor Chelyabinsk
- NHL draft: 86th overall, 2011; Toronto Maple Leafs
- Playing career: 2012–present

Joshua Leivo (born May 26, 1993) is a Canadian professional ice hockey player who is a winger for Avangard Omsk of the Kontinental Hockey League (KHL). He had previously played in the National Hockey League (NHL) within the Toronto Maple Leafs, Vancouver Canucks, Calgary Flames, Carolina Hurricanes and St. Louis Blues organizations.

Born and raised in Ontario, Leivo played with the Barrie Colts U18 AAA team before being drafted by the Sudbury Wolves of the Ontario Hockey League (OHL). During his first regular season with the Wolves, Leivo accumulated 13 goals and 17 assists for 30 points through 64 games. Leivo was selected by the Toronto Maple Leafs in the third round (86th overall) of the 2011 NHL entry draft.

Leivo is the KHL record holder for most goals scored in one regular season, with 49 in the 2024–25 season.

== Early life ==
Leivo was born on May 26, 1993, in Innisfil, Ontario, to Kari Leivo. His father had an extensive minor ice hockey career within the Ontario Junior Hockey League. Although Leivo was born in Innisfil, he was raised in Richmond Hill.

== Playing career ==
=== Amateur career ===
Growing up, Leivo played with the Barrie Colts U18 AAA team before being drafted by the Sudbury Wolves of the Ontario Hockey League (OHL). He was selected in the 11th round after scoring 30 goals with the minor midget team. Leivo immediately joined the team and made an impact on their play. He tallied his first career OHL goal on October 7, 2010, in a 4–3 loss to the Niagara IceDogs. By early February, Leivo and fellow team rookie Sam Scutt moved into the top 25 in OHL rookie scoring after accumulating 17 points. Later that month, Leivo served a two-game suspension for a late instigator penalty during a game. In his first regular-season with the Wolves, Leivo accumulated 13 goals and 17 assists for 30 points through 64 games. After the Wolves were eliminated from playoff contention, he received the teams' Top Rookie Award. Leivo was subsequently selected 86th overall by the Toronto Maple Leafs in the 2011 NHL entry draft.

Following the NHL entry draft, Leivo participated in the Maple Leafs Rookie Camp but was returned to the Wolves for their 2011–12 season. However, due to an injury at the camp, Leivo made his season debut on October 5, 2011, against the Sault Ste. Marie Greyhounds. Once Leivo became a mainstay in the lineup, he greatly improved on his rookie season scoring. By December 20, 2011, Leivo ranked second in team scoring with 11 goals through 29 games and was tied for 7th place in the league in game winning goals. Leivo finished the regular-season with 32 goals and 41 assists and added two goals and one assist in the playoffs. After the Wolves were eliminated from the OHL playoffs, Leivo joined the Maple Leafs American Hockey League (AHL) team, the Toronto Marlies, for the 2012 Calder Cup playoffs.

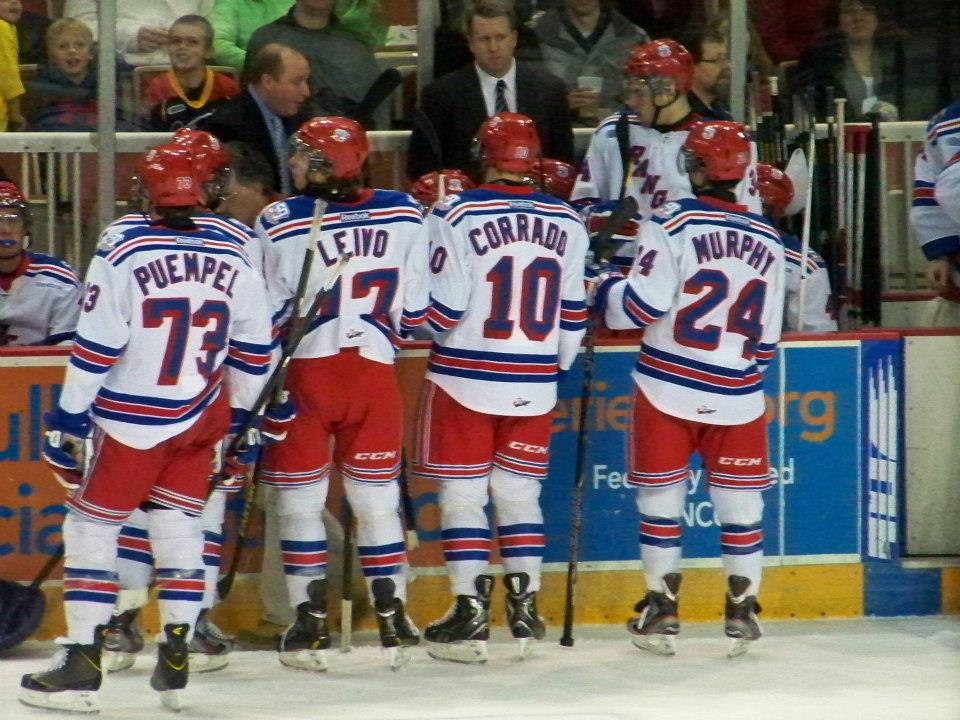
Leivo (second from the left) with the Kitchener Rangers during the 2012–13 season

Leivo returned to the Wolves for the 2012–13 season as one of their alternative captains alongside defensemen Justin Sefton and Charlie Dodero. He began the season strong and earned the OHL Player of The Week honour for the week ending October 7 after scoring six goals in three games with a plus-minus rating of plus-5. He finished the month of October by earning the Wolves' Three-Star Award after scoring 10 goals and six assists, including two winners, for 16 points through 16 games. Leivo continued to improve offensively as the season continued and finished his Sudbury Wolves tenure with 147 points through 164 career games. On January 8, 2013, Leivo was traded in a multi-player deal to the Kitchener Rangers alongside Frank Corrado, Joel Vienneau, and various draft picks. Upon joining the Rangers, Leivo scored 10 goals and 19 assists through 29 regular season games. Once the season concluded, he signed an Amateur Tryout contract with the Toronto Marlies on April 16, 2013.

=== Professional career ===
==== Toronto Maple Leafs organization ====
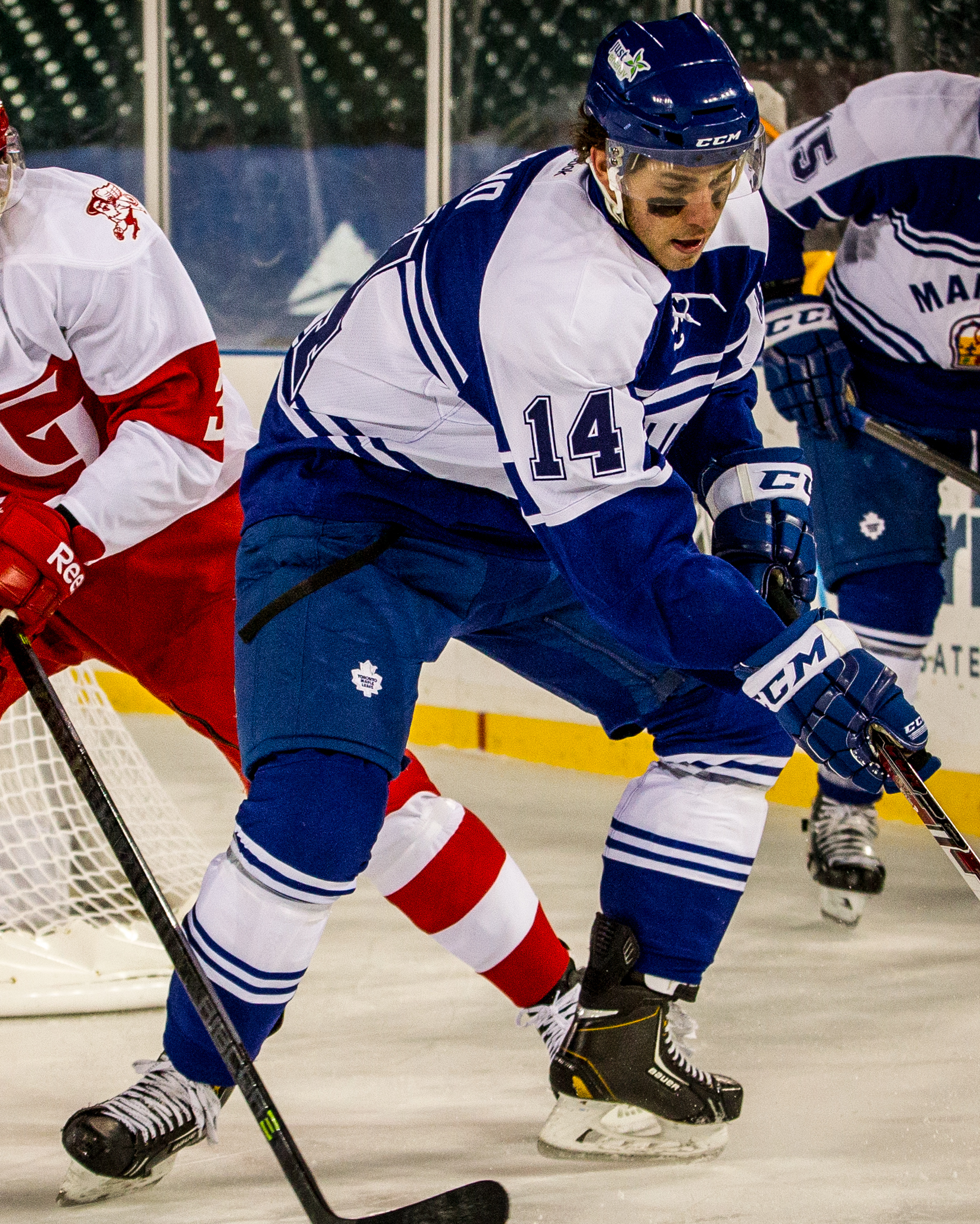
Leivo with the Toronto Marlies in 2013

Leivo played four games with the Marlies, tallying two assists, before the conclusion of the 2012–13 season. He was invited to the Maple Leafs 2013 Prospects Camp where he earned praise from Jim Hughes, the Leaf's Director of Player Development. Hughes stated that Leivo drew comparisons to Leaf's player Joffrey Lupul in terms of his skating abilities. In spite of his improvements, Leivo was cut from the Leaf's training camp and he began the 2013–14 in the AHL with the Marlies. However, in the early stages of the 2013–14 season, on October 10, 2013, Leivo made his NHL debut with the Toronto Maple Leafs in a 4–0 win over the Nashville Predators. He later scored his first NHL goal, against Cam Ward of the Carolina Hurricanes on October 17, 2013. During the game, Leivo accidentally collided with goaltender James Reimer causing him to miss most of the contest. He was re-assigned to the AHL on October 23 but recalled the following day in order to replace Lupul in the lineup. Leivo played seven games with the Leafs but spent the majority of the season with the Marlies. During his time in the AHL, Leivo worked under former figure skater Barbara Underhill to improve his skating stride. Leivo finished his rookie season scoring 23 goals to become the first Marlies rookie to eclipse the 20-goal plateau in franchise history.

Following his first full professional season, Leivo participated in the Leafs Development and training camp playing alongside Nazem Kadri and William Nylander. Due to injuries to David Clarkson and David Booth, Leivo was expected to start the season on a line with Kadri and Lupul. However, before the season began, the Maple Leafs claimed Richard Pánik off waivers from the Tampa Bay Lightning leading to Leivo being re-assigned to the Marlies to begin the 2014–15 season. He played in eight regular season games with the Marlies, collecting four points and nine penalty minutes, before being recalled to the NHL level on November 7, 2014. During the month of March, Leivo declined offensively as he tallied two goals and five points for the Marlies while his shooting percentage fell 9 per cent. Throughout his time with the Marlies, Leivo played on both left and right wings with various linemates including Trevor Smith, Spencer Abbott, Greg McKegg, and Sam Carrick.

Leivo was returned to the Marlies for the 2015–16 season, the final season on his entry-level contract. This season proved to be his most productive as he set career-highs in assists and points while also being selected for the 2016 AHL All-Star Classic. At the time of his All-Star selection, Leivo had tallied 11 goals and 19 assists through 35 games and earned time on the Leaf's NHL roster after riding a five-game straight point streak with the Marlies. Following the AHL All-Star game, Leivo returned to the NHL lineup due to various injuries on the Maple Leaf's main roster. On February 11, 2016, Leivo suffered an upper-body injury after scoring a goal against the Edmonton Oilers causing him to miss numerous games. After recovering, Leivo was re-assigned to the Marlies on February 29 before being recalled again on an emergency basis alongside Frédérik Gauthier in mid-March. By March 25, Leivo had accumulated five goals through 12 games with the Maple Leafs while also collecting 14 goals and 26 assists in 45 games with the Marlies. Leivo re-joined the Marlies on March 25, to help them on their 2016 Calder Cup playoffs quest. Following his stellar season in the AHL, along with decent production in his few NHL appearances, Leivo was rewarded with a two-year contract on July 21, 2016.

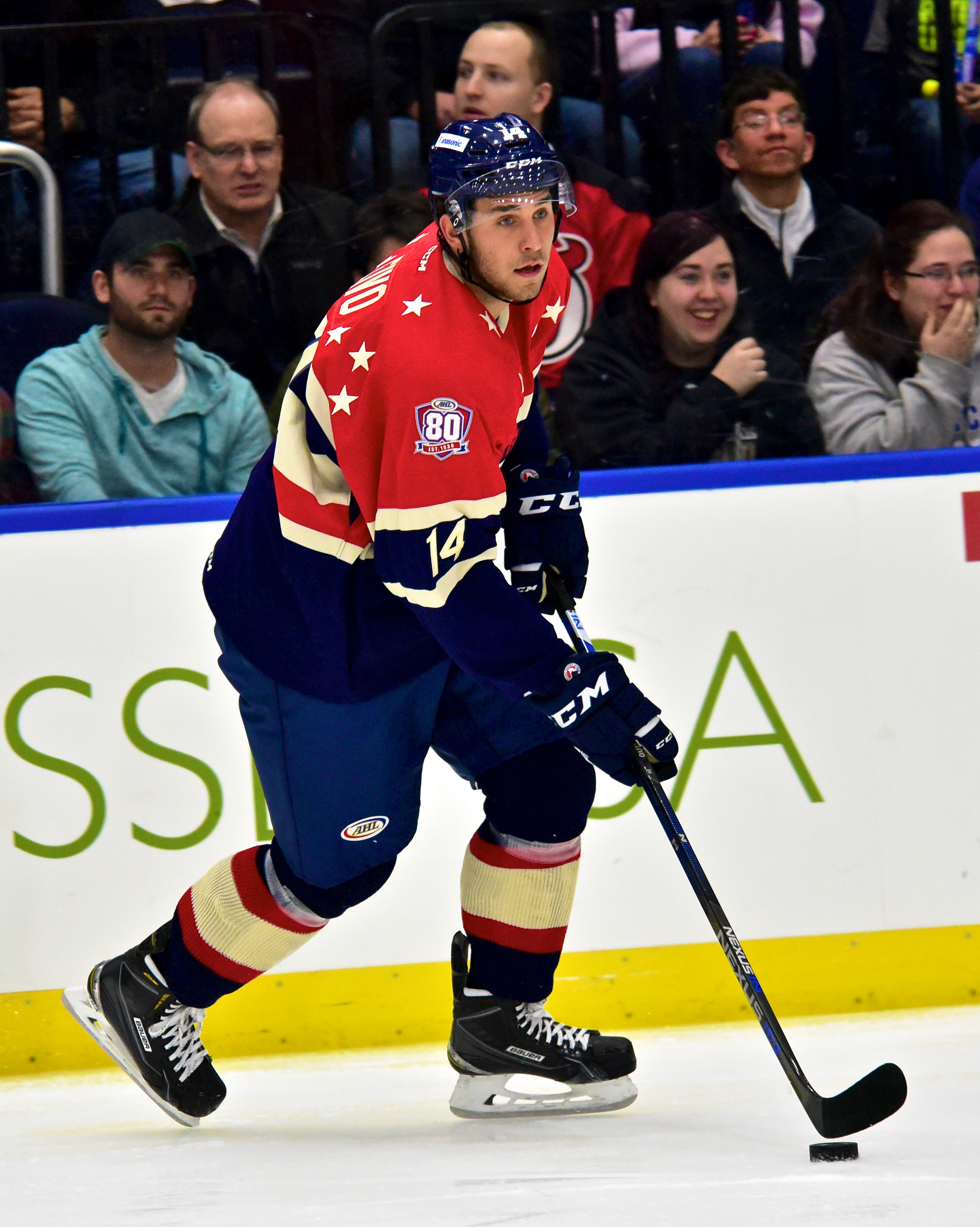
Leivo at the 2016 AHL All-Star Game

In the first year of his new contract, Leivo continued to improve on his previous season's success despite playing fewer overall games due to an injury that derailed the start of his season. After suffering an injury during training camp, Leivo went pointless in five games with the Marlies on a conditioning stint before being declared unfit to play by the Maple Leafs. However, after Peter Holland was traded, Leivo became the team's only extra forward. Leivo eventually made his season debut with the Maple Leafs on December 19. After making his season debut, Leivo failed to become a mainstay in the Leafs lineup until Mitch Marner suffered an injury in mid-February. He scored his first goal of the season in a 7–1 win over the New York Islanders and earned a promotion from the fourth line. He was then slotted into the Leafs' home-ice shutdown line alongside Leo Komarov and Nazem Kadri where he began producing at a rapid rate. However, his health declined in March which disrupted the remainder of his season. Leivo finished the 2016–17 season with 10 points through 13 games. In June, Leivo was one of seven forwards the Leafs placed on their protection list for the 2017 NHL expansion draft.

Leivo began the 2017–18 season trying to crack the Leaf's lineup out of training camp for the third straight season. After playing in five games, and recording one assist, the Leafs signed Leivo to a one-year contract extension worth $925,000. His agent Ian Pulver stated that Leivo wished to stay in Toronto and fight for time on ice rather than take a chance with free agency. However, by February, Leivo had only played in 12 games for the Maple Leafs and as NHL’s trade deadline approached, Nick Kypreos reported that he had requested a trade, citing his lack of use by the team as the primary reason. In spite of this, Leivo was not traded, waived, or earning more playing time in the three weeks following the request. When asked about the request, General manager Lou Lamoriello denied that such a request had been made.

==== Vancouver Canucks ====
After appearing in a career-high 27 games for the Leafs during the 2018–19 season, Leivo was traded to the Vancouver Canucks in exchange for Michael Carcone on December 3, 2018. Upon joining the team, Leivo changed his jersey number from 32 to 17 in honour of his father, who wore 17 when he played hockey. He made his debut with the team the following day as their starting left winger alongside Elias Pettersson and Brock Boeser. In his first five games with the Canucks, Leivo tallied two goals and an assist while averaging 14:50 time on ice. As he continued to play on Vancouver's top offensive line, head coach Travis Green praised Leivo's size, strength, and "ability to hang on to the puck down low." Leivo scored four goals in his first nine games with the Canucks and by mid-February, he had tallied seven goals and 12 points in 28 contests. In spite of his increased offensive ability, Leivo and the Canucks failed to qualify for the 2019 Stanley Cup playoffs. As a restricted free agent at the conclusion of the season, the Canucks signed Leivo to a one-year, $1.5 million contract on July 5.

Although Leivo spent the majority of the previous season with Pettersson and Boeser, he logged at least 10 minutes of 5-on-5 ice time with nine different line combinations throughout October and November. By December, Leivo had accumulated seven goals and 19 points through 36 games before suffering a fractured kneecap. Although he was originally expected to only miss two to three months, Leivo was eventually declared unfit for the remainder of the season.

==== Calgary Flames and Carolina Hurricanes ====
As a free agent from the Canucks after parts of two seasons with the club, Leivo opted to remain in Western Canada by signing a one-year, $875,000 contract with the Calgary Flames on October 24, 2020. He stated that one of the reasons he signed with the Flames was due to his familiarity with numerous players on the team, specifically Sean Monahan, Mark Giordano, Jacob Markström, and Christopher Tanev. Upon joining the team, Monahan described Leivo as "a skilled player, big guy, skates well and thinks the game at a high level." In the Flames home opener against his former team, the Canucks, Leivo played on their top line alongside Monahan and Johnny Gaudreau. As his production dipped, Leivo was dropped to a different line but eventually re-joined Gaudreau and Monahan in early March. Although he had not yet scored his first goal with the team, Leivo was eighth on the team with 2.27 expected goals due to his 24 shots and 27 individual scoring chances. Upon rejoining the Flames' top line, Leivo scored his first goal with the team on March 4, 2021, in a 7–3 win over the Ottawa Senators. Following this game, the Flames fired coach Geoff Ward and replaced him with Darryl Sutter. Under this new coach, Leivo was dropped to the fourth line but scored their only two goals of a 2–1 win over the Montreal Canadiens in Sutter's first game. His rising success stagnated in late-April when he missed seven games while isolating for two weeks after testing positive for COVID-19. Prior to his removal from the NHL's COVID protocol list, the Flames were eliminated from playoff contention.

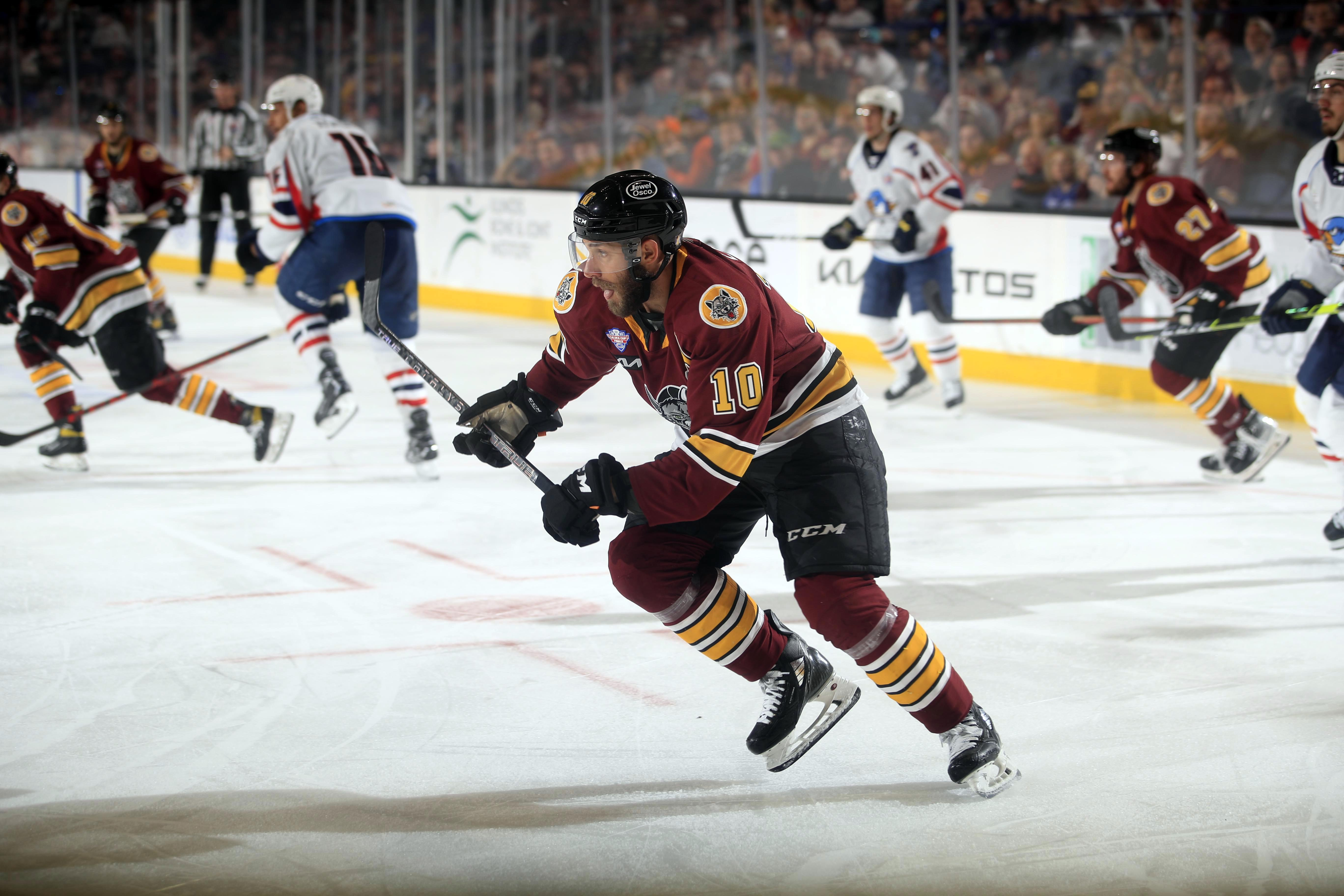
Leivo with the Wolves during the 2022 Calder Cup playoffs

After concluding the 2020–21 season with six goals and three assists through 38 games, Leivo signed a one-year, $750,000 contract with the Carolina Hurricanes. Following their development and training camp, Leivo was waived and re-assigned to their AHL affiliate, the Chicago Wolves. When the NHL once again paused games due to an outbreak of the coronavirus in December, Leivo was assigned to the Chicago Wolves. During his time with the Wolves in December, Leivo accumulated a league-leading 14 points through six games to help Chicago post its first perfect record for a month in its franchise history. As such, he was named the AHL's Player of the Month for December and subsequently became Chicago's sixth player in team history to earn the AHL’s Player of the Month honour. In April, Leivo was suspended one game as a consequence of spearing during a game against the Texas Stars. As the season continued, Leivo and teammates Stefan Noesen and Andrew Poturalski played a vital role in helping the team qualify for the 2022 Calder Cup playoffs. During the post-season, Leivo led all AHL skaters with 20 points through 13 games to help the Wolves advance to the Calder Cup Finals. As the Wolves beat the Springfield Thunderbirds in the Finals, Leivo won the Jack A. Butterfield Trophy as the Most Valuable Player of the Calder Cup Playoffs.

==== St. Louis Blues ====
After a successful season within the Hurricanes organization, Leivo as a free agent was signed to a one-year, $750,000 contract with the St. Louis Blues on July 14, 2022. Leivo made the Blues opening night roster out of training camp to begin the 2022–23 season. He appeared in 51 regular season games with the Blues in a depth role, posting 4 goals and 12 assists for 16 points.

==== Salavat Yulaev Ufa ====
As a free agent from the Blues, Leivo halted his North American career by signing abroad for the first time after agreeing to a one-year contract with Russian club Salavat Yulaev Ufa of the KHL on September 15, 2023.

In April 2024, Leivo signed a one-year extension with Salavat Yulaev. In December 2024 and January 2025 Leivo became the first KHL player to record four hat tricks within a 30-day period, scoring three against Amur Khabarovsk on December 25, three against Barys Astana on December 30, three against HC Neftekhimik Nizhnekamsk on January 15 and finally scoring three against Avangard Omsk on January 20.

Leivo was selected for the 2025 KHL All-Star Game, but could not participate because of an injury.

On February 25, 2025, Leivo signed a two-year contract extension with Ufa, which was scheduled to run through the 2026-27 season.

On March 22, 2025, Leivo scored his 49th goal of the 2024–25 season, setting the KHL record for most goals scored in a regular season, overtaking the 48-goal mark set by Sergei Mozyakin in the 2016–17 season. He also scored the most points of all players in the regular season with 80.

==== Traktor Chelyabinsk ====
On August 18, 2025, five days after his contract with Ufa was terminated, Leivo signed a one-year deal with rival KHL club Traktor Chelyabinsk.

== Personal life ==
Leivo and his wife Bianca have two sons together.

== Career statistics ==
			Regular season					Playoffs
Season	Team	League	GP	G	A	Pts	PIM	GP	G	A	Pts	PIM
2008–09	Barrie Colts AAA	ETA U16	71	31	35	66	65	—	—	—	—	—
2009–10	Barrie Colts AAA	ETA U18	52	21	41	62	59	—	—	—	—	—
2010–11	Sudbury Wolves	OHL	64	13	17	30	37	8	6	7	13	4
2011–12	Sudbury Wolves	OHL	66	32	41	73	61	4	2	1	3	6
2011–12	Toronto Marlies	AHL	1	0	0	0	0	—	—	—	—	—
2012–13	Sudbury Wolves	OHL	34	19	25	44	34	—	—	—	—	—
2012–13	Kitchener Rangers	OHL	29	10	19	29	18	10	3	9	12	8
2012–13	Toronto Marlies	AHL	4	0	2	2	2	3	0	1	1	0
2013–14	Toronto Marlies	AHL	59	23	19	42	27	12	3	5	8	2
2013–14	Toronto Maple Leafs	NHL	7	1	1	2	0	—	—	—	—	—
2014–15	Toronto Marlies	AHL	51	11	21	32	44	5	1	5	6	0
2014–15	Toronto Maple Leafs	NHL	9	1	0	1	4	—	—	—	—	—
2015–16	Toronto Marlies	AHL	51	17	31	48	14	15	4	8	12	12
2015–16	Toronto Maple Leafs	NHL	12	5	0	5	6	—	—	—	—	—
2016–17	Toronto Marlies	AHL	5	0	0	0	6	—	—	—	—	—
2016–17	Toronto Maple Leafs	NHL	13	2	8	10	4	—	—	—	—	—
2017–18	Toronto Maple Leafs	NHL	16	1	3	4	6	—	—	—	—	—
2018–19	Toronto Maple Leafs	NHL	27	4	2	6	7	—	—	—	—	—
2018–19	Vancouver Canucks	NHL	49	10	8	18	25	—	—	—	—	—
2019–20	Vancouver Canucks	NHL	36	7	12	19	4	—	—	—	—	—
2020–21	Calgary Flames	NHL	38	6	3	9	10	—	—	—	—	—
2021–22	Chicago Wolves	AHL	54	22	24	46	38	18	15	14	29	20
2021–22	Carolina Hurricanes	NHL	7	1	2	3	2	—	—	—	—	—
2022–23	St. Louis Blues	NHL	51	4	12	16	25	—	—	—	—	—
2022–23	Springfield Thunderbirds	AHL	2	3	1	4	0	—	—	—	—	—
2023–24	Salavat Yulaev Ufa	KHL	40	15	23	38	14	6	4	5	9	4
2024–25	Salavat Yulaev Ufa	KHL	62	49	31	80	56	14	2	13	15	2
2025–26	Traktor Chelyabinsk	KHL	62	26	39	65	28	5	3	1	4	2
NHL totals			265	42	51	93	93	—	—	—	—	—
KHL totals			164	90	93	183	98	25	9	19	28	8

== Awards and honours ==
Award	Year	Ref
AHL
All-Star Game	2016	
Calder Cup champion	2022	
Jack A. Butterfield Trophy	2022	
