= Kontinental Hockey League =

Russia-based ice hockey league

- Current season, competition or edition: 2026–27 KHL season
- Formerly: Russian Superleague (RSL)
- Game: Hockey
- Founded: 2008; 18 years ago
- President: Alexei Morozov
- Motto: Хоккей – наша игра! (Hockey is our game!); Хакей – наша гульня! Хоккей – біздің ойын! 冰球，就是我们的生活！
- No. of teams: 22
- Country: Russia (19 teams); Belarus (1 team); Kazakhstan (1 team); China (1 team)
- Most recent champions: Lokomotiv Yaroslavl (2nd title)
- Most titles: HC CSKA Moscow; Ak Bars Kazan; Metallurg Magnitogorsk (3 titles each)
- Broadcasters: KHL TV, KHL Prime (Russia (as part of the NTV Plus package), Russia and international through KHL's website); Match TV (Russia); Belarus 5 (Belarus); Qazsport (Kazakhstan); CCTV-5+ (China); Kinopoisk (streaming partner); Regional broadcasters (local team games only) TNV Tatarstan (Ak Bars Kazan); BST (Salavat Yulaev Ufa); Channel 12 (Avangard Omsk); TV-IN (Metallurg Magnitogorsk); Channel 78 (SKA Saint-Petersburg); Pervy Yaroslavsky (Lokomotiv Yaroslavl); NN 24 (Torpedo Nizhny Novgorod); Guberniya (Amur Khabarovsk); OTV (Traktor Chelyabinsk); OTV Primorye (Admiral Vladivostok); OTS (Sibir Novosibirsk)
- Sponsor: Fonbet
- Related competitions: Supreme Hockey League (VHL); Junior Hockey League (MHL)
- Website: KHL.ru

The Kontinental Hockey League (KHL; Russian: Континентальная хоккейная лига (КХЛ), romanized: Kontinental'naya khokkeynaya liga) is an international professional ice hockey league founded in 2008. For the 2025–26 KHL season it comprises member clubs based in Russia (19), Belarus (1), Kazakhstan (1), and China (1), for a total of 22 clubs. The KHL is the highest level of Russian ice hockey.

The KHL had in 2025 total attendance of 5,706,785 spectators in the regular season and the average attendance of 7,256 spectators per game in the regular season. The Gagarin Cup is awarded annually to the league's playoff champion at the end of each season.

== History ==
=== History ===
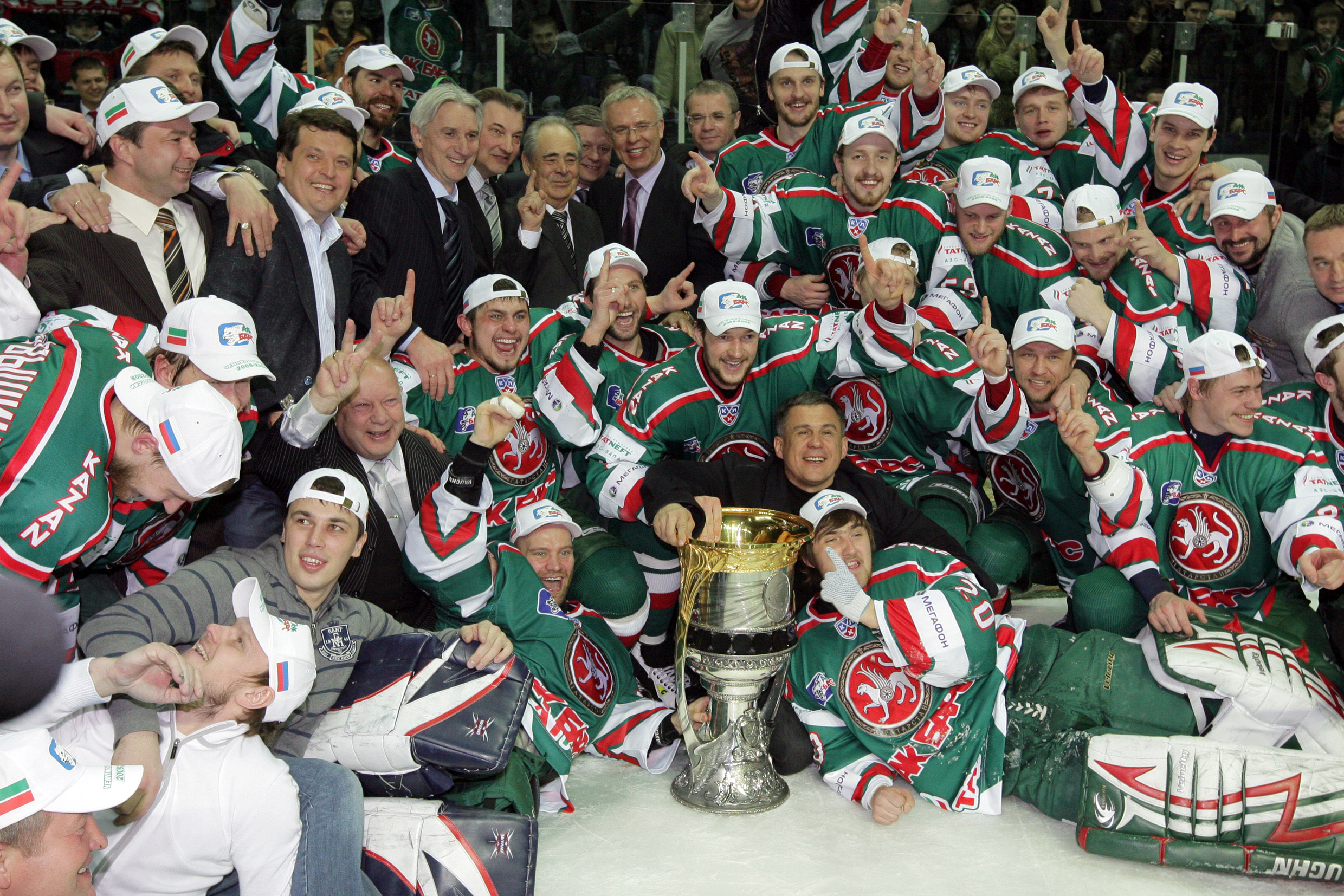
Ak Bars Kazan after winning the Gagarin Cup in 2009

The league formed from the Russian Superleague (RSL) and the champion of the 2007–08 season of the second division, with 24 teams: 21 from Russia and one each from Belarus, Latvia, and Kazakhstan. The teams were divided into four divisions, based on the performance in previous seasons.

The start of the fourth season was overshadowed by the 2011 Lokomotiv Yaroslavl plane crash on 7 September 2011 in which almost all members of the team Lokomotiv Yaroslavl lost their lives shortly after take-off for their flight to their season-opening game in Minsk. The Opening Cup game in Ufa, which was already underway when news of the disaster arrived, was suspended. In memory of the disaster, 7 September remained a day of mourning on which no KHL regular-season games took place, until after the 2017–18 KHL season. Journalist Vsevolod Kukushkin acted as the first press secretary for the league, after it evolved from the Superleague.

After the 2022 Russian invasion of Ukraine, the National Hockey League suspended operation of its Memorandum of Understanding with the KHL. An NHL memo instructed NHL teams to "immediately cease all dealings [direct or indirect] with the KHL and KHL Clubs [and all representatives of both], as well as with player agents who are based in and continue to do business in Russia."

=== Team changes ===
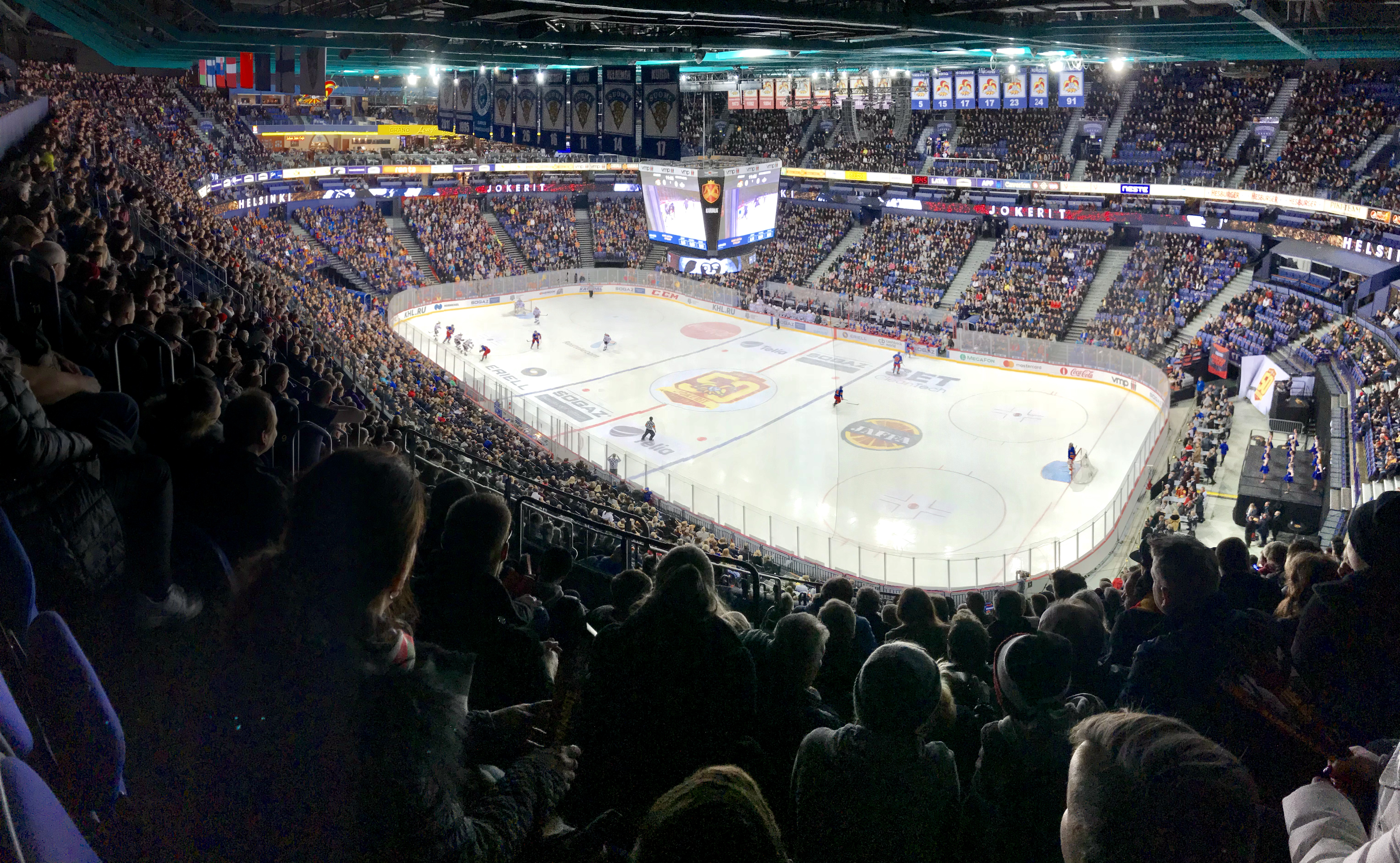
Finnish team Jokerit joined the league in 2014 and left in 2022

==== 2009–2014 ====
In the 2009–10 season, Avtomobilist Yekaterinburg joined the KHL and Khimik Voskresensk was transferred to a lower league. In the 2010–11 season, Yugra Khanty-Mansiysk joined the league.

After several attempts by teams from Central Europe and Scandinavia to join the KHL, expansion beyond the borders of the former Soviet Union was finally realized in 2011. Lev Poprad, a newly founded team based in Poprad, Slovakia was admitted to the league. But after only one season, Lev was replaced by a team of the same name, Lev Praha, from Prague, Czech Republic, while Slovan Bratislava from Bratislava, Slovakia and Ukraine's Donbass from Donetsk joined the KHL as expansion teams for the 2012–13 season. Lev and Slovan qualified for the playoffs in their first KHL season.

In 2013, Medveščak from Zagreb, Croatia, previously playing in the Austrian Hockey League, and Russian expansion team Admiral Vladivostok joined the league, thus expanding the league even further. The league comprised 28 teams during the 2013–14 season, of which 21 were based in Russia and 7 located in the other countries.

In 2014, Finnish team Jokerit from Helsinki, Lada Togliatti (which previously played in the league), and newly created team HC Sochi joined the league. However, HC Donbass did not play in the league for the 2014–15 season, due to Russia's involvement in the Donbas war in Ukraine, but had intended to rejoin later. Two other teams, Lev Praha and Spartak Moscow, also withdrew from the 2014–15 season due to financial problems.

==== 2015–2019 ====
Before the 2015–16 season, Atlant Moscow Oblast withdrew from the KHL due to financial issues, while Spartak Moscow returned after a one-year hiatus. The newly created Chinese club HC Kunlun Red Star from Beijing was admitted for the 2016–17 season. Kunlun was established as part of China’s efforts to prepare a competitive national team for the 2022 Winter Olympics in Beijing.

Before the 2017–18 season, Medveščak Zagreb withdrew from the league to rejoin the Austrian league and Metallurg Novokuznetsk was sent down to the VHL.

After the end of the 2018–19 season, HC Slovan Bratislava withdrew from the KHL due to financial issues to rejoin the Slovak Tipsport Liga.

==== 2020–present ====
On 24 February 2022, Finnish club Jokerit announced the team would withdraw from the league for the remainder of the season, including the playoffs, due to the 2022 Russian invasion of Ukraine. On 27 February 2022, Latvian club Dinamo Riga announced that they too would withdraw for the same reasons. Before the 2023–24 season, HC Lada Togliatti rejoined the KHL.

== Season structure ==
Original logo in Latin script and Cyrillic script until 2016

Since 2009, the league has been divided into East and West conferences. In the current season, both conferences include 12 teams divided into two divisions of 6 teams. Each team plays four games against each division opponent (20), three games against each non-division conference opponent (18), and two games against each non-conference opponent (24) for a total of 62 games.

The eight top-ranked teams in each conference receive playoff berths. Within each conference quarterfinals, semifinals and finals are played before the conference winners play against each other for the Gagarin Cup. The division winners are seeded first and second in their conference, based on their regular-season record. All playoff rounds are played as best-of-seven series. In each round, the top-seeded remaining team is paired with the lowest-seeded team, etc.

In the 2012–13 season, the Nadezhda Cup (Cup of Hope) was introduced, a consolation tournament for the teams who did not qualify for the playoffs. The winning team in the tournament wins the first overall pick in the KHL Junior Draft. The tournament is intended to extend the season and help maintain interest in hockey in the cities of these teams, and help players of national teams prepare for upcoming World Championships.

== Teams ==
Western Conference teams (Divisions:: Bobrov,: Tarasov,: Moscow and Moscow Oblast: see separate Map)
Moscow and Moscow Oblast teams (Divisions:: Bobrov,: Tarasov)
Eastern Conference teams (Divisions::Kharlamov,: Chernyshev), except for Shanghai, which is in the Western Conference.

Overview of Kontinental Hockey League teams
Conference	Division	Team	City	Arena	Capacity	Founded	Joined	Head coach	Captain
Western Conference	Bobrov	SKA Saint Petersburg	(Russia) Saint Petersburg	Ice Palace	12,300	1946	2008	(Russia) Andrei Razin	(Russia) Sergei Plotnikov
Western Conference	Bobrov	HC Sochi	(Russia) Sochi, Krasnodar Krai	Bolshoy Ice Dome	12,035	2014		(Russia) Dmitri Mikhailov	(Russia) Pavel Dedunov
Western Conference	Bobrov	Spartak Moscow	(Russia) Moscow	Megasport Arena	12,396	1946	2008	(Russia) Alexei Zhamnov	(Russia) Andrei Mironov
Western Conference	Bobrov	Torpedo Nizhny Novgorod	(Russia) Nizhny Novgorod, Nizhny Novgorod Oblast	Volga Arena	12,164	1947	2008	(Russia) Alexei Isakov	(Russia) Alexei Kruchinin
Western Conference	Bobrov	Lada Togliatti	(Russia) Tolyatti, Samara Oblast	Lada Arena	6,034	1976	2023	(Russia) Pavel Desyatkov	(Russia) Vladislav Syomin
Western Conference	Tarasov	CSKA Moscow	(Russia) Moscow	CSKA Arena	12,300	1946	2008	(Russia) Igor Nikitin	(Russia) Pavel Karnaukhov
Western Conference	Tarasov	Dinamo Minsk	Minsk, Belarus	Minsk-Arena	15,086	2004	2008	(Russia) Dmitri Kvartalnov	(Belarus) Andrei Stas
Western Conference	Tarasov	Dynamo Moscow	(Russia) Moscow	VTB Arena	10,523	1946	2008	(Russia) Vyacheslav Kozlov	(Russia) Igor Ozhiganov
Western Conference	Tarasov	Shanghai Dragons	Shanghai, China (Saint Petersburg)	SKA Arena (Note: Due to the on-going travel restrictions against the COVID-19 pandemic, Kunlun Red Star determined that they would be unable to play in Cadillac Arena situated in Beijing, China, for the 2020–21 season. In August, the club signed a contract to play out of Mytishchi Arena located on the outskirts of Moscow. On 3 July 2025 the KHL announced the club, rebranded as the Shanghai Dragons, would play out of SKA Arena in St. Petersburg for the 2025–26 season. On 21 March 2026 this arrangement was renewed for the 2026-27 season.)	21,520	2025		(Canada) Mitch Love	(China) Spencer Foo
Western Conference	Tarasov	Lokomotiv Yaroslavl	(Russia) Yaroslavl, Yaroslavl Oblast	Arena 2000	8,653	1959	2008	(Canada) Bob Hartley	(Russia) Alexander Yelesin
Western Conference	Tarasov	Severstal Cherepovets	(Russia) Cherepovets, Vologda Oblast	Ice Palace	5,536	1956	2008	(Russia) Andrei Kozyrev	(Slovakia) Adam Liška
Eastern Conference	Kharlamov	Ak Bars Kazan	(Russia) Kazan, Tatarstan	Tatneft Arena	8,965	1956	2008	(Russia) Anvar Gatiyatulin	(Russia) Alexei Marchenko
Eastern Conference	Kharlamov	Avtomobilist Yekaterinburg	(Russia) Yekaterinburg, Sverdlovsk Oblast	UMMC Arena	12,499	2006	2009	(Russia) Nikolai Zavarukhin	(Russia) Nikita Tryamkin
Eastern Conference	Kharlamov	Metallurg Magnitogorsk	(Russia) Magnitogorsk, Chelyabinsk Oblast	Arena Metallurg	7,704	1955	2008	?	(Russia) Alexei Maklyukov
Eastern Conference	Kharlamov	Neftekhimik Nizhnekamsk	(Russia) Nizhnekamsk, Tatarstan	SCC Arena	5,500	1968	2008	(Russia) Igor Grishin	(Russia) Nikita Khlystov
Eastern Conference	Kharlamov	Traktor Chelyabinsk	(Russia) Chelyabinsk, Chelyabinsk Oblast	Traktor Ice Arena	7,500	1947	2008	(Kazakhstan) Yevgeni Koreshkov	(Russia) Alexander Kadeikin
Eastern Conference	Chernyshev	Admiral Vladivostok	(Russia) Vladivostok, Primorsky Krai	Fetisov Arena	6,000	2013		(Russia) Ilnur Gizatullin	(Czech Republic) Libor Šulák
Eastern Conference	Chernyshev	Amur Khabarovsk	(Russia) Khabarovsk, Khabarovsk Krai	Platinum Arena	7,100	1966	2008	(Belarus) Alexander Andrievsky	(Russia) Evgeny Grachyov
Eastern Conference	Chernyshev	Avangard Omsk	(Russia) Omsk, Omsk Oblast	G-Drive Arena	12,011	1950	2008	(Canada) Guy Boucher	(Russia) Damir Sharipzyanov
Eastern Conference	Chernyshev	Barys Astana	Astana, Kazakhstan	Barys Arena	11,626	1999	2008	(Russia) Mikhail Kravets	(Kazakhstan) Kirill Savitski
Eastern Conference	Chernyshev	Salavat Yulaev Ufa	(Russia) Ufa, Bashkortostan	Ufa Arena	8,522	1957	2008	(Russia) Viktor Kozlov	(Russia) Grigori Panin
Eastern Conference	Chernyshev	Sibir Novosibirsk	(Russia) Novosibirsk, Novosibirsk Oblast	Sibir-Arena	11,650	1962	2008	(Russia) Yaroslav Lyuzenkov	(Russia) Sergei Shirokov

Overview of former Kontinental Hockey League teams
Name	City	Arena	Creation	Seasons
(Russia) Khimik Voskresensk	Voskresensk, Moscow Oblast	Podmoskovie Ice Palace	2005	2008–2009
(Russia) HC MVD	Balashikha, Moscow Oblast	Balashikha Arena	2004	2008–2010
(Slovakia) Lev Poprad	Poprad, Slovakia	Poprad Ice Stadium	2010	2011–2012
(Ukraine) HC Donbass	Donetsk, Ukraine	Druzhba Arena	2001	2012–2014
(Czech Republic) Lev Praha	Prague, Czech Republic	Tipsport Arena	2012	2012–2014
(Russia) Atlant Mytichtchi	Mytishchi, Moscow Oblast	Mytishchi Arena	1953	2008–2015
(Russia) Metallurg Novokuznetsk	Novokuznetsk, Kemerovo Oblast	Kuznetsk Metallurgists Sports Palace	1949	2008–2017
(Croatia) Medveščak Zagreb	Zagreb, Croatia	Dom Sportova	1961	2013–2017
(Russia) Yugra Khanty-Mansiysk	Khanty-Mansiysk, Khanty-Mansi Autonomous Okrug	Arena Ugra	2006	2010–2018
(Slovakia) Slovan Bratislava	Bratislava, Slovakia	Ondrej Nepela Arena	1921	2012–2019
(Finland) Jokerit Helsinki	Helsinki, Finland	Hartwall Arena	1967	2014–2022
(Latvia) Dinamo Riga	Riga, Latvia	Arena Riga	2008	2008–2022
(Russia) HC Vityaz	Balashikha, Moscow Oblast	Balashikha Arena	1996	2008–2025

== Players ==
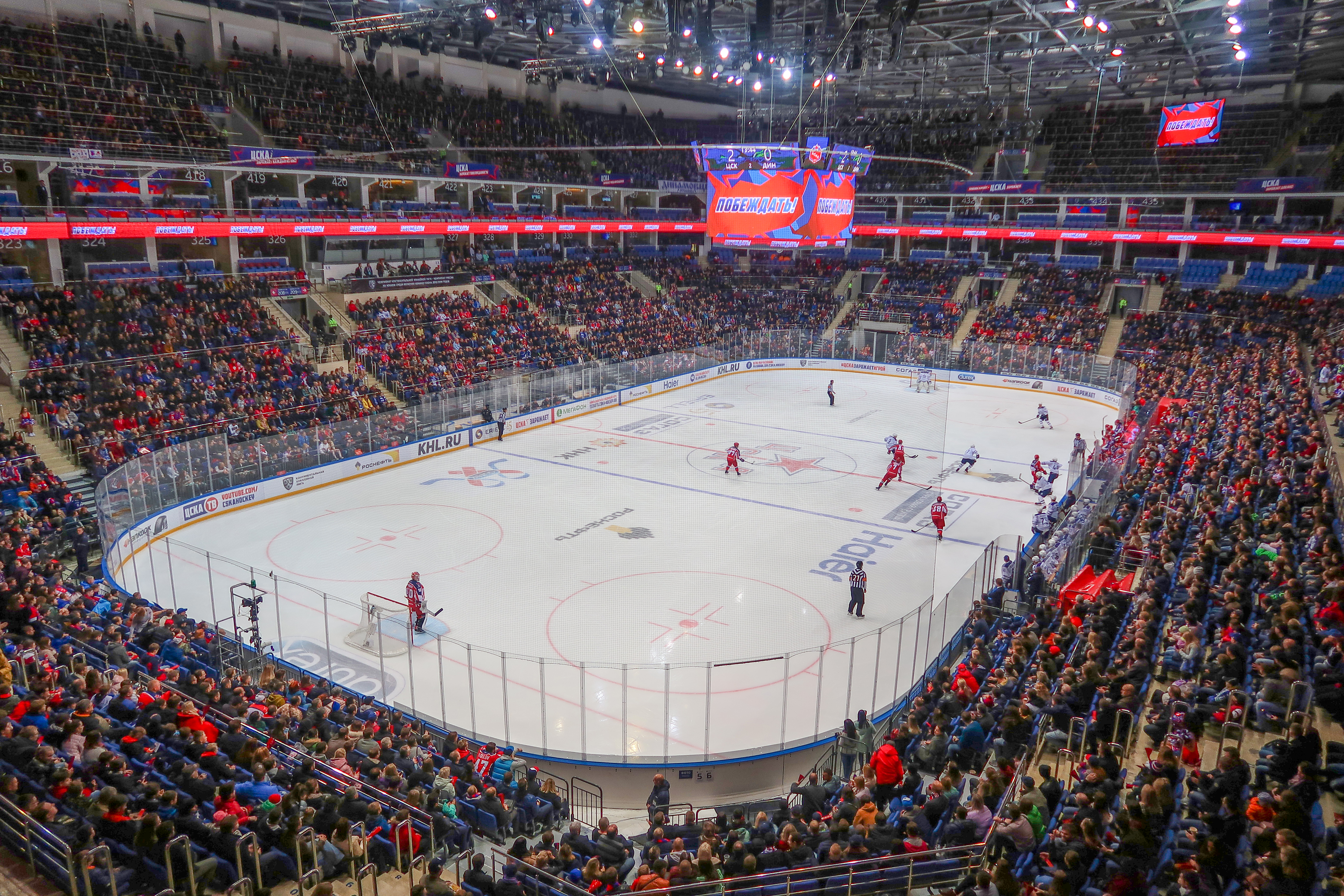
KHL match between CSKA Moscow and Dynamo Moscow at CSKA Arena, Moscow

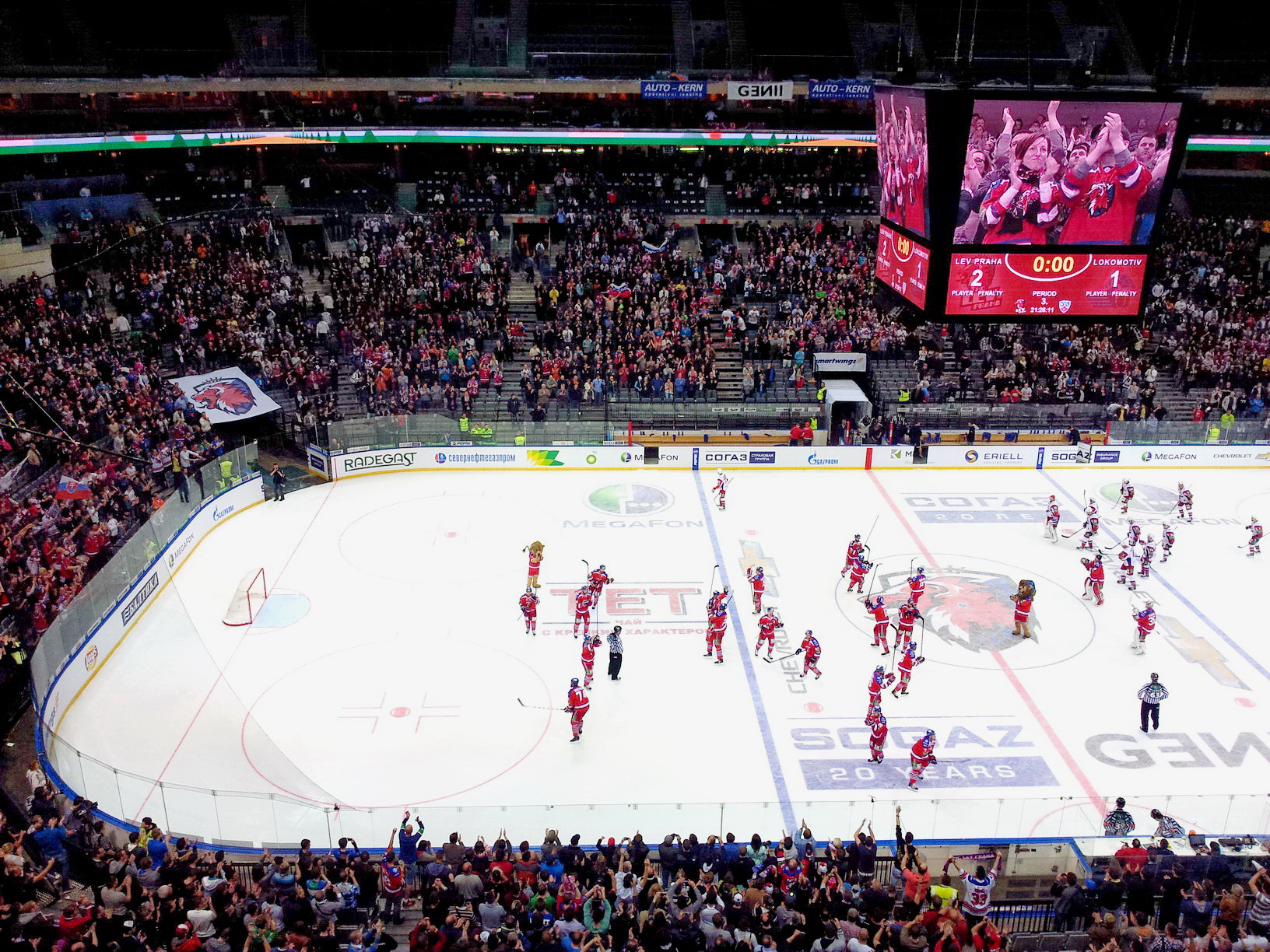
KHL match between HC Lev Praha and Lokomotiv Yaroslavl at O2 Arena, Prague

Before the inaugural season, several KHL teams signed several players from the NHL. A dispute between the two leagues over some of these signings was supposed to have been resolved by an agreement signed on 10 July 2008, whereby each league would honor the contracts of the other, but the signing of Alexander Radulov by the KHL was made public one day after the agreement (though it was actually signed two days before the agreement taking effect), leading to an investigation by the International Ice Hockey Federation. On 4 October 2010, the conflict between the leagues was settled when both signed a new agreement to honor one another's contracts.

The league also set up rules for the NHL lockout which lasted from 16 September 2012 to 12 January 2013. According to these regulations, each KHL team was allowed to add up to three NHL players to its roster, with only one foreign player allowed. 40 NHL players, the majority of them Russians, played in the KHL during the lockout.

For the 2012–13 season, the KHL board limited Russian clubs to a maximum of five foreign players on their roster and required non-Russian clubs to have at least five players from their respective countries. Foreign goaltenders on Russian teams also became subject to a limit regarding their total seasonal ice time. In response to restrictions on Russian athletes following the 2022 Russian invasion of Ukraine, the limit on foreign players for Russian clubs was initially reduced to three for the 2023–24 season, then restored to five for the 2024-25 season and onwards.

KHL players are represented by the Kontinental Hockey League Players' Trade Union.

After the 2022 Russian invasion of Ukraine, some non-Russian players elected to leave their teams, at the risk of forfeiting their salaries. The departing players included former NHL players Markus Granlund, Nick Shore, Geoff Platt, Kenny Agostino, Teemu Hartikainen, Philip Larsen, Sakari Manninen, Harri Säteri, Jyrki Jokipakka, Joakim Nordström, Lucas Wallmark, and Juho Olkinuora.

=== Nationalities of players ===
During the 2023–2024 season, players representing 18 nations played at least one game in the KHL. A player's nationality is for various reasons sometimes ambiguous. For the table presented below, the nationality "is determined based on the last country that the player represented in international competition. If a player has never played for a national team, usually the country of birth is chosen as the player nationality, unless there is strong evidence indicating otherwise".

For players born in former Soviet republics, the situation is often more complex due to dual citizenship and naturalization. For instance, a list of players born in Ukraine gives case-by-case details for some of those players. China has also given citizenship to several hockey players without Chinese ancestry for them to compete internationally for China while allowing them to maintain their previous citizenship. In some cases, players can change their nationality registration with the league on a year-by-year basis, and their nationality with the league may not match that of their International Ice Hockey Federation registration. Non-Russians represented about 30–35% of KHL players and were mostly Central European, Nordic, and North American. Following the 2022 Russian invasion of Ukraine, some non-Russian players elected to leave their teams and clubs Jokerit Helsinki and Dinamo Riga left the league, reducing non-Russians to about 25% of KHL players. In 2023–24, more than 800 players played at least one game in the league (see table below). Russian teams are currently limited to a maximum of three foreign players. —

Country (current number of teams)	Players active (2008-09)	Players active (2009-10)	Players active (2010–11 )	Players active (2011-12)	Players active (2012–13)	Players active (2013–14)	Players active (2014–15)	Players active (2015–16)	Players active (2016–17)	Players active (2017–18)	Players active (2018–19)	Players active (2019–20)	Players active (2020–21)	Players active (2021–22)	Players active (2022–23)	Players active (2023–24)
Austria	1	2	1	1	—N/a	—N/a	—N/a	—N/a	—N/a	—N/a	—N/a	—N/a	1	—N/a	—N/a	—N/a
Belarus (1 team)	32	31	24	25	35	46	50	43	40	38	34	49	50	42	44	50
Canada	34	28	29	19	31	61	50	35	54	53	59	62	48	56	62	58
China (1 team)	—N/a	—N/a	—N/a	—N/a	—N/a	—N/a	—N/a	—N/a	3	—N/a	2	—N/a	—N/a	10	5	—N/a
Croatia	—N/a	—N/a	—N/a	—N/a	—N/a	3	2	2	3	1	1	—N/a	—N/a	—N/a	—N/a	1
Czech Republic	31	30	33	41	46	47	29	35	35	33	28	20	23	20	4	6
Denmark	1	—N/a	—N/a	—N/a	—N/a	1	2	4	3	5	6	4	3	2	—N/a	—N/a
Estonia	—N/a	—N/a	—N/a	—N/a	—N/a	—N/a	—N/a	—N/a	—N/a	—N/a	1	—N/a	1	2	—N/a	1
Finland	8	16	1	33	40	37	50	47	51	40	42	44	53	39	1	1
France	—N/a	—N/a	—N/a	—N/a	—N/a	1	1	2	—N/a	3	1	1	1	2	1	1
Germany	3	2	2	2	1	3	3	1	—N/a	—N/a	—N/a	2	3	2	2	2
Italy	—N/a	—N/a	—N/a	—N/a	—N/a	—N/a	—N/a	2	2	—N/a	—N/a	—N/a	—N/a	—N/a	—N/a	—N/a
Israel	—N/a	—N/a	—N/a	—N/a	—N/a	—N/a	—N/a	—N/a	—N/a	1	—N/a	—N/a	1	—N/a	—N/a	—N/a
Japan	—N/a	—N/a	—N/a	—N/a	—N/a	—N/a	—N/a	—N/a	—N/a	—N/a	—N/a	—N/a	—N/a	—N/a	1	1
Kazakhstan (1 team)	43	37	37	32	35	36	34	41	33	29	24	23	18	18	21	29
Latvia	31	26	28	27	35	32	29	33	32	31	28	35	33	25	2	1
Lithuania	—N/a	—N/a	—N/a	—N/a	—N/a	—N/a	—N/a	—N/a	1	3	2	2	1	2	1	1
Norway	—N/a	1	1	2	3	3	3	1	—N/a	1	—N/a	—N/a	—N/a	—N/a	—N/a	—N/a
Russia (19 teams)	538	532	492	475	539	569	592	632	663	644	580	571	638	565	626	629
Slovakia	17	22	28	28	51	43	32	27	27	23	24	6	6	9	9	9
Slovenia	—N/a	—N/a	—N/a	—N/a	—N/a	2	4	4	4	4	3	—N/a	—N/a	—N/a	1	1
South Korea	—N/a	—N/a	—N/a	1	1	1	—N/a	—N/a	—N/a	—N/a	—N/a	—N/a	—N/a	—N/a	—N/a	—N/a
Sweden	11	12	17	20	24	22	28	27	24	26	26	32	35	39	7	4
Switzerland	—N/a	1	—N/a	—N/a	—N/a	—N/a	—N/a	—N/a	1	—N/a	—N/a	—N/a	—N/a	—N/a	—N/a	—N/a
Ukraine (Note: For further information, see List of Ukrainians in the KHL.)	12	12	8	4	10	11	2	2	5	4	2	2	1	1	1	1
United States	11	6	8	5	12	19	25	19	23	20	19	14	17	14	17	23
Total	773	758	727	715	863	936	936	956	1,006	956	884	868	933	847	806	819

== Trophies and awards ==
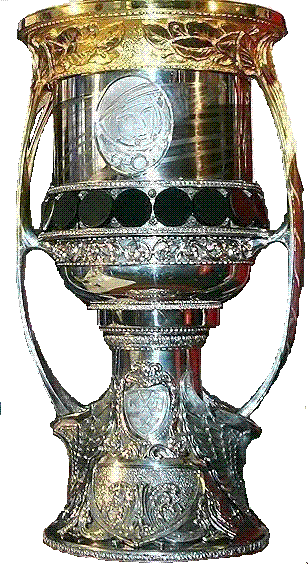
Gagarin Cup

The winner of the playoff is awarded the Gagarin Cup. The highest placed Russian team is awarded the Championship of Russia. The team ranked first in the standings after the regular season, i.e. the winner of the regular season, is awarded the Continental Cup (Russian: Кубок Континента, Kubok Kontinenta). The winners of the conference finals are awarded the Eastern Conference Champion Cup (Russian: Кубок Победителю конференции Восток, Kubok Pobeditelyu konferentsii Vostok) and the Western Conference Champion Cup (Russian: Кубок Победителю конференции Запад, Kubok Pobeditelyu konferentsii Zapad).

The KHL presents annual awards to its most successful players. The KHL also awards the Opening Cup annually to the winner of the first game between the Gagarin Cup winner and the runner-up of the previous season. On 10 September 2011, three days after the 2011 Lokomotiv Yaroslavl plane crash, the KHL head office decided to honor the deceased in the 2011 Opening Cup. The League gives the Andrey Starovoytov Award annually to its referees of the year, also called the "Golden Whistle".

=== Seasons overview ===
Season	Teams	Gagarin Cup Winner	Gagarin Cup finalist	Final score	Continental Cup Winner	Top scorer
2008–09	24	Ak Bars Kazan	Lokomotiv Yaroslavl	4–3	Salavat Yulaev Ufa (Note: In the first season, Salavat Yulaev Ufa was the winner of the regular season, but the Continental Cup was not yet awarded.) (129 points)	Sergei Mozyakin (76 points: 34 G, 42 A)
2009–10	24	Ak Bars Kazan	HC MVD	4–3	Salavat Yulaev Ufa (129 points)	Sergei Mozyakin (66 points: 27 G, 39 A)
2010–11	23	Salavat Yulaev Ufa	Atlant Moscow Oblast	4–1	Avangard Omsk (118 points)	Alexander Radulov (80 points: 20 G, 60 A)
2011–12	23	Dynamo Moscow	Avangard Omsk	4–3	Traktor Chelyabinsk (114 points)	Alexander Radulov (63 points: 25 G, 38 A)
2012–13	26	Dynamo Moscow	Traktor Chelyabinsk	4–2	SKA Saint Petersburg (115 points)	Sergei Mozyakin (76 points: 35 G, 41 A)
2013–14	28	Metallurg Magnitogorsk	HC Lev Praha	4–3	Dynamo Moscow (115 points)	Sergei Mozyakin (73 points: 34 G, 39 A)
2014–15	28	SKA Saint Petersburg	Ak Bars Kazan	4–1	CSKA Moscow (139 points)	Alexander Radulov (71 points: 24 G, 47 A)
2015–16	28	Metallurg Magnitogorsk	CSKA Moscow	4–3	CSKA Moscow (127 points)	Sergei Mozyakin (67 points: 32 G, 35 A)
2016–17	29	SKA Saint Petersburg	Metallurg Magnitogorsk	4–1	CSKA Moscow (137 points)	Sergei Mozyakin (85 points: 48 G, 37 A)
2017–18	27	Ak Bars Kazan	CSKA Moscow	4–1	SKA Saint Petersburg (138 points)	Ilya Kovalchuk (63 points: 31 G, 32 A)
2018–19	25	CSKA Moscow	Avangard Omsk	4–0	CSKA Moscow (106 points)	Nikita Gusev (82 points: 17 G, 65 A)
2019–20	24	Cancelled due to the COVID-19 pandemic			CSKA Moscow (94 points)	Vadim Shipachyov (65 points: 17 G, 48 A)
2020–21	23	Avangard Omsk	CSKA Moscow	4–2	CSKA Moscow (91 points)	Vadim Shipachyov (66 points; 20 G, 46 A)
2021–22	24	CSKA Moscow	Metallurg Magnitogorsk	4–3	Not determined	Vadim Shipachyov (67 points: 24 G, 43 A)
2022–23	22	CSKA Moscow	Ak Bars Kazan	4–3	SKA Saint Petersburg (105 points)	Dmitrij Jaškin (62 points: 40 G, 22 A)
2023–24	23	Metallurg Magnitogorsk	Lokomotiv Yaroslavl	4–0	Dynamo Moscow (98 points)	Nikita Gusev (89 points: 23 G, 66 A)
2024–25	23	Lokomotiv Yaroslavl	Traktor Chelyabinsk	4–1	Lokomotiv Yaroslavl (102 points)	Josh Leivo (80 points: 49 G, 31 A)
2025–26	22	Lokomotiv Yaroslavl	Ak Bars Kazan	4–2	Lokomotiv Yaroslavl (98 points)	Sam Anas (89 points: 37 G, 52 A)

Season	Opening Cup Winner	Nadezhda Cup Winner	Golden Stick (Regular Season MVP)	Playoff MVP
2008–09	Salavat Yulaev Ufa	Nadezhda Cup not yet introduced	Danis Zaripov	Alexei Morozov
2009–10	Ak Bars Kazan	Nadezhda Cup not yet introduced	Alexander Radulov	Ilya Nikulin
2010–11	Dynamo Moscow	Nadezhda Cup not yet introduced	Alexander Radulov	Konstantin Barulin
2011–12	Salavat Yulaev Ufa	Nadezhda Cup not yet introduced	Alexander Radulov	Alexander Yeryomenko
2012–13	Dynamo Moscow	Dinamo Riga	Sergei Mozyakin	Alexander Yeryomenko
2013–14	Dynamo Moscow	Avangard Omsk	Sergei Mozyakin	Sergei Mozyakin
2014–15	Metallurg Magnitogorsk	Cancelled due to economic reasons	Alexander Radulov	Ilya Kovalchuk
2015–16	CSKA Moscow	Not contested	Sergei Mozyakin	Sergei Mozyakin
2016–17	Metallurg Magnitogorsk	Not contested	Sergei Mozyakin	Vasily Koshechkin
2017–18	SKA Saint Petersburg	Not contested	Nikita Gusev	Justin Azevedo
2018–19	SKA Saint Petersburg	Not contested	Kirill Kaprizov	Ilya Sorokin
2019–20	Avangard Omsk	Not contested	Dmitrij Jaškin	Cancelled due to the COVID-19 pandemic
2020–21	Ak Bars Kazan	Not contested	Vadim Shipachyov	Sergey Tolchinsky
2021–22	Avangard Omsk	Not contested	Vadim Shipachyov	Aleksandr Popov
2022–23	CSKA Moscow	Not contested	Dmitrij Jaškin	Mikhail Grigorenko
2023–24	Ak Bars Kazan	Not contested	Nikita Gusev	Ilya Nabokov
2024–25	Lokomotiv Yaroslavl	Not contested	Josh Leivo	Alexander Radulov
2025–26	Lokomotiv Yaroslavl	Not contested	Damir Sharipzyanov	Daniil Isayev

== Statistics ==
=== Single season records ===
==== Regular season ====
Record		Name	Season
Points	89	(Russia) Nikita Gusev (Dynamo Mo.)	2023–24
Points	89	(United States) Sam Anas (Dinamo Mi.)	2025–26
Goals	49	(Canada) Josh Leivo (Ufa)	2024–25
Assists	66	(Russia) Nikita Gusev (Dynamo Mo.)	2023–24
Shots on goal	298	(Canada) Josh Leivo (Ufa)	2024–25
Plus/minus	+48	(Russia) Vladislav Gavrikov (SKA)	2018–19
Penalty minutes	374	(Canada) Darcy Verot (Vityaz)	2009–10
Wins	38	(Czech Republic) Jakub Kovář (Avtomobilist)	2018–19
Shutouts	13	(Russia) Alexei Murygin (Lokomotiv)	2015–16

==== Playoffs ====
Record		Name	Season
Points	33	(Russia) Sergei Mozyakin (Magnitogorsk)	2013–14
Goals	15	(Russia) Evgenii Dadonov (SKA)	2014–15
Goals	15	(Russia) Danis Zaripov (Magnitogorsk)	2016–17
Assists	20	(Russia) Sergei Mozyakin (Magnitogorsk)	2013–14
Assists	20	(Canada) Chris Lee (Magnitogorsk)	2016–17
Shots on goal	84	(Canada) Sheldon Rempal (Ufa)	2024–25
Plus/minus	+16	(Slovakia) Dominik Graňák (Dynamo Moscow)	2012–13
Plus/minus	+16	(Canada) Chris Lee (Magnitogorsk)	2016–17
Penalty minutes	69	(Russia) Maxim Goncharov (Ufa)	2015–16
Wins	16	(Russia) Alexander Yeryomenko (Dynamo Moscow)	2011–12, 2012–13
Wins	16	(Russia) Vasily Koshechkin (Magnitogorsk)	2013–14
Wins	16	(Finland) Mikko Koskinen (SKA)	2014–15
Wins	16	(Russia) Emil Garipov (Kazan)	2017–18
Wins	16	(Russia) Ilya Sorokin (CSKA Moscow)	2018–19
Wins	16	(Russia) Ivan Fedotov (CSKA Moscow)	2021–22
Wins	16	(Russia) Ilya Nabokov (Magnitogorsk)	2023–24
Wins	16	(Russia) Daniil Isaev (Yaroslavl)	2024–25, 2025–26
Shutouts	7	(Sweden) Lars Johansson (CSKA Moscow)	2020–21

=== Career records ===
==== Regular season ====
Record		Name	Years
Points	892	(Russia) Vadim Shipachyov (Cherepovets, Saint Petersburg, Dynamo Moscow, Ak Bars Kazan, Dinamo Minsk)	2008–2026
Goals	351	(Russia) Sergei Mozyakin (Atlant, Magnitogorsk)	2008–2021
Assists	613	(Russia) Vadim Shipachyov (Cherepovets, Saint Petersburg, Dynamo Moscow, Ak Bars Kazan, Dinamo Minsk)	2008–2026
Games played	954	(Russia) Vadim Shipachyov (Cherepovets, Saint Petersburg, Dynamo Moscow, Ak Bars Kazan, Dinamo Minsk)	2008–2022
Plus/minus	+243	(Russia) Alexander Radulov (Ufa, CSKA Moscow, Ak Bars Kazan, Lokomotiv Yaroslavl)	2008–2026
Penalty minutes	1114	(Russia) Grigori Panin (Kazan, CSKA Moscow, Ufa)	2008–2026
Wins	292	(Russia) Vasily Koshechkin (Togliatti, Magnitogorsk, Cherepovets)	2008–2023
Shutouts	75	(Russia) Vasily Koshechkin (Togliatti, Magnitogorsk, Cherepovets)	2008–2023

==== Playoffs ====
Record		Name	Years
Points	172	(Russia) Sergei Mozyakin (Atlant, Magnitogorsk)	2008–2021
Goals	68	(Russia) Sergei Mozyakin (Atlant, Magnitogorsk)	2008–2021
Assists	104	(Russia) Sergei Mozyakin (Atlant, Magnitogorsk)	2008–2021
Games played	189	(Russia) Ilya Kablukov (Nizhny Novgorod, Spartak Moscow, Atlant, Saint Petersburg, Omsk, Dynamo Moscow, Shanghai)	2008–2026
Plus/minus	+60	(Russia) Maxim Shalunov (Chelyabinsk, Novosibirsk, CSKA Moscow, Yaroslavl)	2010–2026
Penalty minutes	430	(Russia) Grigori Panin (Kazan, CSKA Moscow, Ufa)	2008–2026
Wins	86	(Russia) Vasily Koshechkin (Togliatti, Magnitogorsk, Cherepovets)	2008–2021
Shutouts	16	(Russia) Ilya Sorokin (CSKA Moscow)	2015–2020

=== Longest KHL game ===
Game duration	Date	Game	Home	Visitor	Result	Overtime goal scorer
142 min 09 sec (5 OT)	22 March 2018	Conference Semi-Finals Game 5	CSKA	Jokerit	1–2	(Finland) Mika Niemi

=== All-time team records ===
Since its foundation in 2008, 35 teams have played in the KHL, with 32 having qualified for at least one postseason. Of the 24 founding teams, only Metallurg Novokuznetsk and Khimik Voskresensk had never qualified for the playoffs (both are no longer in the league). The table gives the final regular-season ranks for all teams, with the playoff performance encoded in colors. The teams are ordered by their best championship results.

Team	2009	2010	2011	2012	2013	2014	2015	2016	2017	2018	2019	2020 (Note: Conference semifinals cancelled due to the COVID-19 pandemic)	2021	2022	2023	2024	2025	2026
CSKA Moscow	4	12	19	18	6	12	1	1	1	2	1	1	1	7	2	13	11	7
Ak Bars Kazan	2	8	4	6	2	4	4	12	7	4	8	2	2	5	4	8	7	4
Metallurg Magnitogorsk	6	3	5	4	7	2	6	8	3	8	6	13	7	1	10	3	4	1
SKA Saint Petersburg	8	2	7	2	1	3	2	10	2	1	2	3	6	3	1	2	13	9
Dynamo Moscow (Note: Includes record of Dynamo Moscow before the merger with HC MVD in 2010)	7	5	6	3	4	1	3	6	4	18	10	7	3	8	6	1	5	11
Lokomotiv Yaroslavl (Note: Did not participate in the 2011–12 season due to the 2011 Lokomotiv Yaroslavl plane crash of 7 September 2011, that killed the entire team)	3	7	3		8	15	10	2	5	5	4	11	5	11	3	4	1	3
Avangard Omsk	16	11	1	5	3	20	8	5	6	12	7	6	4	10	8	5	8	2
Salavat Yulaev Ufa	1	1	2	8	9	8	14	9	15	10	11	12	8	4	7	6	3	13
Traktor Chelyabinsk	12	18	18	1	5	19	15	19	10	6	17	21	9	2	16	11	2	14
Atlant Moscow Oblast	5	6	8	9	17	17	16											
Lev Praha					15	5												
HC MVD Balashikha	18	4																
Avtomobilist Yekaterinburg		19	20	22	26	14	18	14	21	7	3	8	12	18	9	9	6	8
Sibir Novosibirsk	19	20	11	20	12	13	7	7	19	14	18	10	18	14	11	18	15	16
Jokerit Helsinki							5	3	12	3	9	5	10	6				
Torpedo Nizhny Novgorod	11	15	17	7	20	9	12	11	9	11	14	15	14	16	5	14	14	10
Neftekhimik Nizhnekamsk	14	9	15	17	14	25	22	16	20	9	19	16	20	15	15	17	17	15
Donbass Donetsk					18	6												
Spartak Moscow	9	10	12	19	23	23		21	26	16	13	9	16	12	19	7	9	12
Barys Astana	15	14	14	10	10	7	11	17	13	19	5	4	11	17	20	22	23	18
Dinamo Riga	10	13	13	15	24	10	21	22	28	26	16	23	23	22				
Dinamo Minsk	22	17	16	13	19	26	9	18	8	20	24	24	15	13	18	16	10	5
Severstal Cherepovets	17	16	9	11	11	18	17	27	23	17	22	20	13	9	14	10	12	6
Admiral Vladivostok						16	19	13	16	22	21	22		23	13	20	16	20
Sochi							13	4	14	15	12	19	21	21	22	21	21	22
Yugra Khanty-Mansiysk			10	14	16	22	25	23	25	27								
Vityaz Moscow Oblast	23	23	21	23	22	24	20	24	11	21	15	14	17	20	12	23	19	
Amur Khabarovsk	20	21	22	12	25	28	28	25	22	13	23	17	19	19	17	15	22	17
Lada Togliatti	13	22					24	26	27	25						12	20	21
Slovan Bratislava					13	21	26	15	17	24	25							
Medveščak Zagreb						11	23	20	24									
Kunlun Red Star Beijing									18	23	20	18	22	24	21	19	18	
Shanghai Dragons																		19
Metallurg Novokuznetsk	21	24	23	16	21	27	27	28	29									
Lev Poprad				21														
Khimik Voskresensk	24																	

Color	Result
Red	Gagarin Cup Winner
Yellow	Runner-up
Green	Semifinalist
Light Blue	Quarterfinalist
Blue	Qualified for playoffs
Purple	Nadezhda Cup Winner
Light Gray	Not qualified for playoffs
Gray	Did not play in the season

=== Attendance statistics ===
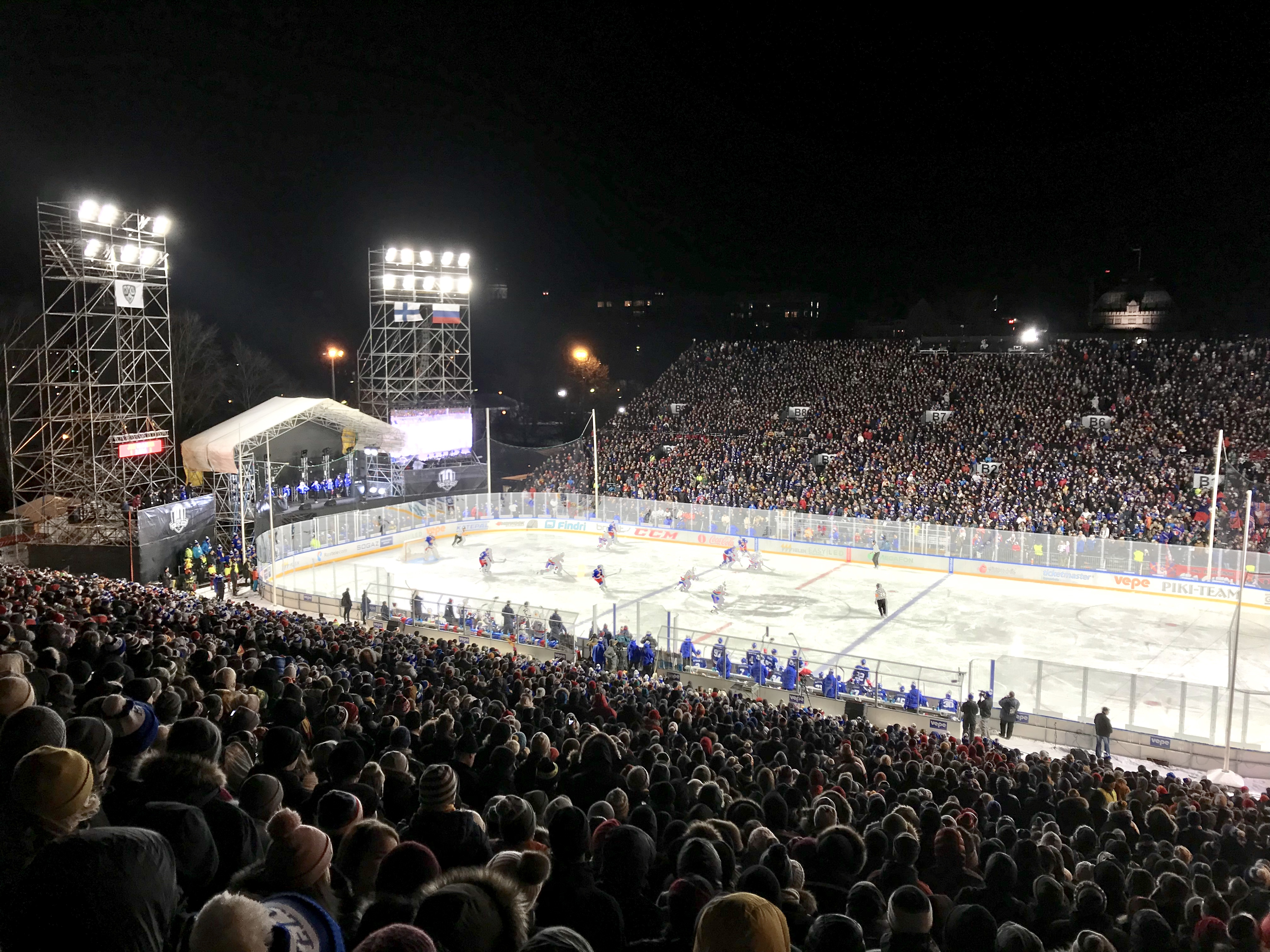
Jokerit – SKA in Helsinki Ice Challenge 2017, with KHL-record attendance (17,645)

Total and average attendance by season, including play-offs:

Season	Total Attendance	Average Attendance
2008–09	3,886,948	6,233
2009–10	4,223,698	6,264
2010–11	4,293,271	6,944
2011–12	4,320,908	6,861
2012–13	4,775,086	6,912
2013–14	5,190,133	6,614
2014–15	6,066,093	7,405
2015–16	5,875,645	7,065
2016–17	5,892,889	7,210
2017–18	5,318,175	7,005
2018–19	5,644,804	7,544
2019–20	5,118,949	6,854
2020–21	1,791,346	2,329
2021–22	1,842,676	2,771
2022–23	4,792,508	5,740
2023–24	5,929,949	6,879
2024–25	6,543,257	7,530
2025–26	5,874,018	7,853

== All-Star Game ==
The Kontinental Hockey League All-Star Game is an exhibition game held annually at the midway point (usually January or February) of the season, with the league's star players playing against each other. Previously played in a "Russian players versus the rest of the world" format, it is now run in a similar format to the NHL All-Star Game, where the four divisions face off in 3v3 matches.

== See also ==
- Asia League Ice Hockey – Multinational ice hockey league
- Beijing International Ice Hockey League – Ice hockey league based in Beijing
- Ice Hockey Federation of Russia – Ice hockey governing body in Russia
- List of Soviet and Russian ice hockey champions
- List of Soviet and Russian ice hockey goal scoring champions
- List of Soviet and Russian ice hockey scoring champions
- Potential Kontinental Hockey League expansion
- Supreme Hockey League – Ice hockey league in Eastern Europe

Preceded by Russian Superleague	Kontinental Hockey League; 2008—present	Succeeded by none
