= Salavat Yulaev Ufa =

Ice hockey team based in Ufa, Russia

- City: Ufa, Russia
- League: KHL; 2008–present: RSL 1996–2008; IHL 1992–1996; Soviet League Class A2 1964–1978, 1979–1980, 1981–1982, 1983–1985, 1987–1992; Soviet League Class A 1978–1979, 1980–1981, 1982–1983, 1985–1987; Soviet League Class B 1958–1964
- Conference: Eastern
- Division: Chernyshev
- Founded: 1957; 69 years ago as SK Gastello Ufa
- Home arena: Ufa Arena (capacity: 8,250)
- Colours
- General manager: Rinat Bashirov
- Head coach: Viktor Kozlov
- Captain: Grigori Panin
- Affiliates: Toros Neftekamsk (VHL); Tolpar Ufa (MHL)
- Website: hcsalavat.ru

Hockey Club Salavat Yulaev (Russian: Хоккейный клуб «Салават Юлаев», romanized: Hokkejnyj klub «Salavat Julajev»; Bashkir: «Салауат Юлаев» хоккей клубы, romanized: «Salawat Yulayev» xokkey klubı), commonly referred as Salavat Yulaev Ufa, is a professional ice hockey club based in Ufa, Russia. It is a member of the Chernyshev Division in the Kontinental Hockey League (KHL).

Established in 1957, Salavat Yulaev spent the Soviet era mainly in the lower divisions, only appearing in the top league for five seasons, though since the dissolution of the Soviet Union they have been in the top league in Russia.

They have won the Gagarin Cup as the KHL champion once, in 2011, and have won the regular season championship twice, in 2009 and 2010, winning the inaugural Continental Cup for the latter. They also won the final Russian Superleague title, in 2008.

== History ==
=== Soviet era ===
Founded in 1957, the club was named SK Gastello Ufa during the 1958 Soviet Championship season. then, the club changed its name to Salavat Yulaev Ufa in 1961. the club is named after Salavat Yulaev, a national hero of Bashkortostan. After years of competing in the low-level divisions the team was invited to the second level of the Soviet League "Class A" in 1964, subsequently getting promotion to the elite group for the 1978-1979, 1980-81, 1982-83, 1985-1986 and 1986-1987 seasons.

=== Post-Soviet era ===
Salavat Yulaev was one of the founding clubs of the International Hockey League and later the Russian Superleague, and normally advanced to the playoffs at that time. The club reached its first Russian championship semifinals in 1996-97 and eventually won its first Championship title in 2007-08, beating Lokomotiv Yaroslavl by three matches to two.

=== KHL era ===
On July 11, 2008, Salavat signed NHL rising star Alexander Radulov. On June 9, 2009, a press release was issued, stating that Viktor Kozlov had signed a three-year contract to return to Russia. The club has also signed Norwegian forward Patrick Thoresen for the 2009–10 and 2010–11 seasons.

Salavat Yulaev marked its first year in the KHL by winning its first two regular season titles and becoming the first club to be awarded the Continental Cup. The following season, the team advanced to the final against Atlant and won their first Gagarin Cup as champions. They remained a powerful club in the KHL over the following seasons, reaching the playoffs each year, though did not advance past the conference finals in any year.

In March 2022, all four Finnish players, including the all-time scoring leader Teemu Hartikainen, and Geoff Platt and Philip Larsen left the team due to the Russian invasion of Ukraine.

== Season-by-season KHL record ==
Note: GP = Games played, W = Wins, OTW = Overtime Wins, SOW = Penalty Shootout Wins, SOL = Penalty Shootout Losses, OTL = Overtime Losses, L = Losses, GF = Goals for, GA = Goals against, Pts = Points

Season	GP	W	L	OTL	Pts	GF	GA	Finish	Top scorer	Playoffs
2008–09	56	38	8	2	129	203	116	1st, Bobrov	Alexei Tereshchenko (58 points: 29 G, 29 A; 55 GP)	Lost in preliminary round, 1–3 (Avangard Omsk)
2009–10	56	37	8	1	129	215	116	1st, Chernyshev	Alexander Radulov (63 points: 24 G, 39 A; 54 GP)	Lost in Conference Finals, 2–4 (Ak Bars Kazan)
2010–11	54	29	12	0	109	210	144	2nd, Chernyshev	Alexander Radulov (80 points: 20 G, 60 A; 54 GP)	Gagarin Cup Champions, 4–1 (Atlant Moscow Oblast)
2011–12	54	23	18	1	89	173	152	2nd, Chernyshev	Alexander Radulov (63 points: 25 G, 38 A; 50 GP)	Lost in Conference Quarterfinals, 2–4 (Ak Bars Kazan)
2012–13	52	24	17	0	88	148	140	2nd, Chernyshev	Igor Mirnov (37 points: 21 G, 16 A; 49 GP)	Lost in Conference Semifinals, 3–4 (Ak Bars Kazan)
2013–14	54	25	16	3	94	140	155	2nd, Chernyshev	Dmitri Makarov (40 points: 11 G, 29 A; 54 GP)	Lost in Conference Finals, 1–4 (Metallurg Magnitogorsk)
2014–15	60	25	27	2	86	173	158	4th, Chernyshev	Kirill Koltsov (48 points: 18 G, 30 A; 60 GP)	Lost in Conference Quarterfinals, 1–4 (Metallurg Magnitogorsk)
2015–16	60	29	22	3	101	179	156	3rd, Chernyshev	Linus Omark (57 points: 18 G, 39 A; 60 GP)	Lost in Conference Finals, 1–4 (Metallurg Magnitogorsk)
2016–17	60	27	20	13	88	169	174	3rd, Chernyshev	Linus Omark (56 points: 14 G, 42 A; 55 GP)	Lost in Conference Quarterfinals, 1–4 (Ak Bars Kazan)
2017–18	56	31	20	5	93	151	139	1st, Chernyshev	Linus Omark (55 points: 16 G, 39 A; 55 GP)	Lost in Conference Semifinals, 3–4 (Traktor Chelyabinsk)
2018–19	62	31	21	10	72	158	140	3rd, Chernyshev	Linus Omark (49 points: 10 G, 39 A; 56 GP)	Lost in Conference Finals, 2–4 (Avangard Omsk)
2019–20	62	29	23	10	68	153	144	3rd, Chernyshev	Linus Omark (54 points: 12 G, 42 A; 59 GP)	Won in Conference Quarterfinals, 4–2 (Avangard Omsk); Playoffs cancelled due to COVID-19 pandemic
2020–21	60	28	17	5	81	181	151	2nd, Chernyshev	Teemu Hartikainen (64 points: 28 G, 36 A; 53 GP)	Lost in Conference Semifinals, 0–4 (Ak Bars Kazan)
2021–22	45	28	11	6	62	131	96	1st, Chernyshev	Markus Granlund (38 points: 8 G, 30 A; 41 GP)	Lost in Conference Semifinals, 2–4 (Traktor Chelyabinsk)
2022–23	68	38	20	10	86	174	141	1st, Chernyshev	Sergei Shmelyov (51 points: 19 G, 32 A; 67 GP)	Lost in Conference Quarterfinals, 2–4 (Admiral Vladivostok)
2023–24	68	42	20	6	90	196	143	2nd, Chernyshev	Sasha Chmelevski (56 points: 27 G, 29 A; 67 GP)	Lost in Last 16, 2–4 (Traktor Chelyabinsk)
2024–25	68	45	20	3	93	212	159	1st, Chernyshev	Josh Leivo (80 points: 49 G, 31 A; 62 GP)	Lost in Semifinals, 1–4 (Lokomotiv Yaroslavl)
2025–26	68	36	26	6	78	180	171	2nd, Chernyshev	Sheldon Rempal (46 points: 15 G, 31 A; 38 GP)	Lost in Quarterfinals, 0–4 (Lokomotiv Yaroslavl)

== Players ==
=== Current roster ===
Updated 1 October 2026.

No.	Nat	Player	Pos	S/G	Age	Acquired	Birthplace
61	(Russia)	Danil Alalykin	C	L	25	2019	Ufa, Russia
4	(Russia)	Alexander Alexeyev	D	L	26	2026	St. Petersburg, Russia
33	(Russia)	Nikita Bogdanov	G	L	31	2026	St. Petersburg, Russia
57	(Canada)	Devin Brosseau	LW	L	31	2025	Saint-Lambert, Quebec, Canada
77	(Russia)	Artur Faizov	RW	L	20	2025	Sterlitamak, Russia
13	(Russia)	Artyom Gorshkov	F	L	23	2024	Moscow, Russia
8	(Russia)	Alexander Komarov	D	L	23	2021	Ufa, Russia
43	(Russia)	Yevgeni Kulik	D	L	33	2025	Moscow, Russia
55	(Russia)	Gleb Kuzmin	LW	L	29	2017	Voronezh, Russia
71	(Russia)	Maxim Kuznetsov	RW	L	24	2025	Magnitogorsk, Russia
81	(Canada)	Matthew Maggio	RW	R	23	2026	Windsor, Ontario, Canada
79	(Russia)	Artyom Nabiyev	RW	L	21	2024	Perm, Russia
78	(Russia)	Denis Orlovich-Grudkov	RW	L	30	2026	St. Petersburg, Russia
11	(Russia)	Grigori Panin (C)	D	L	40	2017	Karaganda, Kazakh SSR, Soviet Union
56	(Canada)	Sheldon Rempal	RW	R	31	2025	Calgary, Alberta, Canada
21	(Canada)	Jack Rodewald (A)	C	R	32	2025	Winnipeg, Manitoba, Canada
89	(Russia)	Nikita Shcherbakov	D	L	18	2025	Chelyabinsk, Russia
87	(Russia)	Vadim Shipachyov (A)	C	L	39	2026	Cherepovets, Russian SFSR
18	(Canada)	Dean Stewart	D	R	28	2025	Portage la Prairie, Manitoba, Canada
72	(Russia)	Yegor Suchkov	LW	L	25	2020	Chelyabinsk, Russia
73	(Russia)	Yaroslav Tsulygin	D	R	22	2022	Ufa, Russia
32	(Russia)	Sergei Varlov	D	L	26	2021	Naberezhnye Chelny, Russia
35	(Russia)	Semyon Vyazovoy	G	L	23	2023	Ufa, Russia
65	(Russia)	Vladislav Yefremov (A)	C	L	31	2023	Novy Rozdol, Russia
1	(Russia)	Ilya Yelin	G	L	21	2026	Orsk, Russia
37	(Russia)	Maxim Zagrebin	C	L	21	2026	Izhevsk, Russia
97	(Russia)	Alexander Zharovsky	RW	L	19	2024	Klin, Russia
52	(Russia)	Nikita Zorkin (A)	D	L	26	2023	Moscow, Russia

== Franchise records and leaders ==
=== Scoring leaders ===
These are the top-ten point-scorers in KHL history. Figures are updated after each completed KHL regular season.

Note: Pos = Position; GP = Games played; G = Goals; A = Assists; Pts = Points; P/G = Points per game; = current Salavat Yulaev Ufa player

Points
Player	Pos	GP	G	A	Pts	P/G
(Finland) Teemu Hartikainen	LW	472	157	198	355	.75
(Sweden) Linus Omark	LW	285	70	201	271	.95
(Russia) Alexander Radulov	RW	210	91	163	254	1.21
(Russia) Kirill Koltsov	D	311	49	130	179	.58
(Russia) Igor Grigorenko	RW	278	92	85	177	.64
(United States) Sasha Chmelevski	C	208	79	85	164	.78
(Russia) Alexander Kadeikin	C	280	54	99	153	.55
(Denmark) Philip Larsen	D	253	43	105	148	.58
(Russia) Sergei Zinovjev	C	207	48	90	138	.67
(Russia) Vitali Proshkin	D	266	23	103	126	.48

Goals
Player	Pos	G
(Finland) Teemu Hartikainen	LW	157
(Russia) Igor Grigorenko	RW	92
(Russia) Alexander Radulov	RW	91
(United States) Sasha Chmelevski	C	79
(Sweden) Linus Omark	LW	70
(Canada) Josh Leivo	LW	64
(Russia) Alexander Kadeikin	C	54
(Norway) Patrick Thoresen	C	53
(Russia) Igor Mirnov	C	53
(Finland) Antti Pihlström	LW	52

Assists
Player	Pos	A
(Sweden) Linus Omark	LW	201
(Finland) Teemu Hartikainen	LW	198
(Russia) Alexander Radulov	RW	163
(Russia) Kirill Koltsov	D	130
(Denmark) Philip Larsen	D	105
(Russia) Vitali Proshkin	D	103
(Russia) Alexander Kadeikin	C	99
(Russia) Sergei Zinovjev	C	90
(Russia) Igor Grigorenko	RW	85
(United States) Sasha Chmelevski	C	85

== Honours ==
=== Champions ===
(gold) Gagarin Cup (1): 2011
(gold) KHL Regular Season / Continental Cup (2): 2009, 2010
(gold) Opening Cup (2): 2008–09, 2011–12
(gold) Russian Superleague (1): 2008
(gold) Federation Cup (1): 1995
(gold) Soviet League Class A2 (5): 1978, 1980, 1982, 1985, 1992
(gold) Pajulahti Cup (1): 2003
(gold) Clas Ohlson Cup (1): 2009

=== Runners-up ===
(bronze) KHL 2013–14, 2015–16
(silver) Continental Cup (1): 1997
(silver) Spengler Cup (2): 2007, 2014
(bronze) Russian Superleague (1): 1997
(bronze) IHL Championship (1): 1995
