= Continental Cup (KHL) =

- Sport: Ice hockey
- Awarded for: Team finished 1st in the KHL standings after the regular season

History
- First award: 2009–10 KHL season
- First winner: Salavat Yulaev Ufa
- Most wins: CSKA Moscow (6)
- Most recent: Metallurg Magnitogorsk (2025–26)

The Continental Cup (Russian: Кубок Континента, Kubok Kontinenta), also known as the Kontinental Cup, is the trophy presented to the winner of the regular season of the Kontinental Hockey League, i.e. the team with the most points at the end of the regular season.

The name and trophy were introduced during the second season of the competition. In the first season it was simply named the regular season winner. During the history of KHL, the winner of Continental Cup had never won Gagarin Cup in the same season before 2018–19, when CSKA Moscow became the first team to win both trophies.

== Cup winners ==
Key to colors
W	Western Conference member
E	Eastern Conference member

Team won the Gagarin Cup.
Team lost in the Gagarin Cup Finals.
Team lost in the first round of the playoffs.

Bold Team with the most points ever accumulated in a season during the trophy's existence.

Season	Team		Games	Points	Playoff result
2009–10	E	(Russia) Salavat Yulaev Ufa	56	129	Lost in Conference Finals (AKB)
2010–11	E	(Russia) Avangard Omsk	54	118	Lost in Conference Semi-Finals (MMG)
2011–12	E	(Russia) Traktor Chelyabinsk	54	114	Lost in Conference Finals (AVG)
2012–13	W	(Russia) SKA Saint Petersburg	52	115	Lost in Conference Finals (DYN)
2013–14	W	(Russia) Dynamo Moscow	54	115	Lost in Conference Quarter-Finals (LOK)
2014–15	W	(Russia) CSKA Moscow	60	139	Lost in Conference Finals (SKA)
2015–16	W	(Russia) CSKA Moscow	60	127	Lost in Gagarin Cup Finals (MMG)
2016–17	W	(Russia) CSKA Moscow	60	137	Lost in Conference Semi-Finals (LOK)
2017–18	W	(Russia) SKA Saint Petersburg	56	138	Lost in Conference Finals (CSK)
2018–19	W	(Russia) CSKA Moscow	62	106	Won Gagarin Cup (AVG)
2019–20	W	(Russia) CSKA Moscow	62	94	playoffs not completed
2020–21	W	(Russia) CSKA Moscow	60	91	Lost in Gagarin Cup Finals (AVG)
2021–22	-	Not awarded (Note: The 2021–22 regular season was ended prematurely at the Olympic break due to complications from the COVID-19 pandemic; as a result, teams finished with an uneven total of games played, and the final standings were instead determined by points percentage. At the time of the suspension, Metallurg Magnitogorsk led the league with 71 points in 48 games.)	45–50 (Note: The original season schedule called for 56 games per team; however, COVID-19-related postponements and the aforementioned premature conclusion of the season resulted in teams finishing with as few as 45 or as many as 50 games played.)	-	-
2022–23	W	(Russia) SKA Saint Petersburg	68	105	Lost in Conference Finals (CSK)
2023–24	W	(Russia) Dynamo Moscow	68	98	Lost in Quarter Finals (TRK)
2024–25	W	(Russia) Lokomotiv Yaroslavl	68	102	Won Gagarin Cup (TRK)
2025–26	E	(Russia) Metallurg Magnitogorsk	68	105	Lost in Conference Finals (AKB)

== See also ==
- Gagarin Cup, awarded to the winner of the KHL play-offs
- Presidents' Trophy, an NHL trophy having the same function as the Continental Cup
