= List of Kontinental Hockey League arenas =

== Current arenas ==
Image	Arena	Location	Team(s)	Capacity	Opened
	SKA Arena	(Russia) Saint Petersburg	SKA and Shanghai Dragons (China)	21,542	2023
	Minsk-Arena	(Belarus) Minsk	Dinamo Minsk	15,086	2010
	UMMC Arena	(Russia) Yekaterinburg	Avtomobilist Yekaterinburg	12,588	2025
	Ice Palace	(Russia) Saint Petersburg	Dynamo Moscow; September 12, 2026 (postponed match)	12,452	2000
	Megasport Sport Palace	(Russia) Moscow	Spartak Moscow	12,396	2006
	Volga Arena	(Russia) Nizhny Novgorod	Torpedo Nizhny Novgorod	12,350	2026
	CSKA Arena	(Russia) Moscow	CSKA Moscow	12,100	2015
	Bolshoy Ice Dome	(Russia) Sochi	HC Sochi	12,045	2012
	G-Drive Arena	(Russia) Omsk	Avangard Omsk	12,011	2022
	Sibir Arena	(Russia) Novosibirsk	Sibir Novosibirsk	11,860	2023
	Barys Arena	(Kazakhstan) Astana	Barys Astana	11,626	2015
	VTB Arena	(Russia) Moscow	Dynamo Moscow	10,523	2019
	Arena 2000	(Russia) Yaroslavl	Lokomotiv Yaroslavl	9,070	2001
	TatNeft Arena	(Russia) Kazan	Ak Bars Kazan	8,890	2005
	Ufa Arena	(Russia) Ufa	Salavat Yulaev Ufa	8,522	2007
	Traktor Ice Arena	(Russia) Chelyabinsk	Traktor Chelyabinsk	7,500	2009
	Arena Metallurg	(Russia) Magnitogorsk	Metallurg Magnitogorsk	7,500	2007
	Platinum Arena	(Russia) Khabarovsk	Amur Khabarovsk	7,100	2003
	Lada Arena	(Russia) Tolyatti	Lada Togliatti	6,034	2013
	Fetisov Arena	(Russia) Vladivostok	Admiral Vladivostok	5,915	2013
	Ice Palace	(Russia) Cherepovets	Severstal Cherepovets	5,536	2006
	Neftekhim Ice Palace	(Russia) Nizhnekamsk	Neftekhimik Nizhnekamsk	5,500	2005

== Future/proposed arenas ==
Future, Proposed Arenas
Image	Arena	Team	Location	Capacity	Opening
	Luzhniki Palace of Sports (rebuilt)	Spartak Moscow	Moscow	12,000	2028
	CSKA Universal Arena (rebuilt)	HC CSKA Moscow	Moscow	10,000	2028

== Former arenas ==
Eastern Conference
Kharlamov Division
Team	Arena	Years Used	Capacity	Opened	City	Reference
Traktor Chelyabinsk
Traktor Chelyabinsk	Yunost Sport Palace	2008–2009	3,650	1967	Chelyabinsk	
Kunlun Red Star
Kunlun Red Star	Wukesong Arena	2016–2020	14,000	2008	Beijing	
Kunlun Red Star	Feiyang Ice Skating Center	2016–2020	4,800		Shanghai	
Lada Togliatti
Lada Togliatti	Volgar Sports Palace	2008–2010	2,900	1975	Tolyatti	
Chernyshev Division
Team	Arena	Years Used	Capacity	Opened	City	Reference
Barys Astana
Barys Astana	Kazakhstan Sports Palace	2008–2015	4,070	2001	Astana	
Avangard Omsk	Blinov Sports and Concerts Complex	1987–2007	5,500	1986	Omsk	
Avangard Omsk	Arena Omsk	2008–2018	10,318	2007	Omsk	
Avangard Omsk	Balashikha Arena	2018–2022	5,525	2007	Balashikha	
Sibir Novosibirsk	Ice Sports Palace Sibir	1964–2023	7,400	1964	Novosibirsk	

Western Conference
Bobrov Division
Team	Arena	Years Used	Capacity	Opened	City	Reference
Dinamo Minsk
Dinamo Minsk	Minsk Sports Palace	2008–2009	3,311	1966	Minsk	
Spartak Moscow
Spartak Moscow	Sokolniki Arena	2008–2016	5,530	1956	Moscow	
Spartak Moscow	Luzhniki Small Sports Arena	2016–2017	8,512	1956	Moscow	
Spartak Moscow	CSKA Arena	2017–2021	12,100	2015	Moscow	
SKA Saint Petersburg	Yubileyny Sports Palace	1964–2005	7,000	1964	Saint Petersburg	
Torpedo Nizhny Novgorod	KRK Nagorny	1965–2025	5,500	1964	Nizhny Novgorod	
Tarasov Division
Team	Arena	Years Used	Capacity	Opened	City	Reference
Dynamo Moscow
Dynamo Moscow	Luzhniki Small Sports Arena	2008–2015	8,512	1956	Moscow	
Dynamo Moscow	VTB Ice Palace	2015–2018	12,100	2015	Moscow	
Dynamo Moscow	Megasport Sport Palace	2018–2018	12,126	2006	Moscow	
Vityaz Moscow Region
Vityaz Moscow Region	Ice Hockey Center 2004	2008–2013	3,300	2004	Chekhov	
Vityaz Moscow Region	Vityaz Ice Palace	2013–2022	5,500	2000	Podolsk	
CSKA Moscow
CSKA Moscow	CSKA Ice Palace	2008–2018	5,500	1991	Moscow	

== Former teams ==
Former Teams Arenas
Team (years in KHL)	Arena	Years Used	Capacity	Opened	City	Reference
Khimik Voskresensk (2008–2009)	Podmoskovie Ice Palace	2008–2009	4,500	1966	Voskresensk	
MVD Balashikha (2008–2010)	Balashikha Arena	2008–2010	5,525	2007	Balashikha	
Lev Poprad (2011–2012)	Poprad Ice Stadium	2011–2012	4,500	1973	Poprad	
Donbass Donetsk (2012–2014)	Druzhba Arena	2012–2014	4,130	1976	Donetsk	
Lev Prague (2012–2014)
Lev Prague (2012–2014)	Tipsport Arena	2012–2014	13,238	1962	Prague	
Lev Prague (2012–2014)	O2 Arena (selected games)	2012–2014	17,383	2004	Prague	
Atlant Moscow Oblast (2008–2015)	Mytishchi Arena	2008–2015	7,000	2005	Mytishchi	
Metallurg Novokuznetsk (2008–2017)	Kuznetsk Metallurgists Sports Palace	2008–2017	7,533	1984	Novokuznetsk	
Medveščak Zagreb (2013–2017)
Medveščak Zagreb (2013–2017)	Dom Sportova	2013–2017	6,400	1972	Zagreb	
Medveščak Zagreb (2013–2017)	Arena Zagreb (selected games)	2013–2014	15,200	2008	Zagreb	
Yugra Khanty-Mansiysk (2010–2018)	Arena Ugra	2010–2018	5,500	2008	Khanty-Mansiysk	
HC Slovan Bratislava (2012–2019)	Ondrej Nepela Arena	2012–2019	10,055	1940 (2011)	Bratislava	
Jokerit Helsinki (2014–2022)	Hartwall Arena	2014–2022	13,506	1997	Helsinki	
Dinamo Riga (2008–2022)	Arena Riga	2008–2022	10,300	2006	Riga	
HC Vityaz (2008–2025)	Balashikha Arena	2022–2025	5,525	2007	Balashikha	
HC Vityaz (2008–2025)	Vityaz Ice Palace	2013–2022	5,500	2000	Podolsk	
HC Vityaz (2008–2025)	Vityaz Ice Hockey Center	2008–2013	3,300	2004	Chekhov	

== Neutral venues, selected/ special games ==
Arena
Team	Arena	Years Used	Capacity	Opened	City	Reference
CSKA Moscow
CSKA Moscow	Megasport Arena	2010 (1 game)	14,000	2006	Moscow	
Dynamo Moscow
Dynamo Moscow	Megasport Arena	2008 (1 game), 2010 (5 games)	14,000	2006	Moscow	
Lev Prague
Lev Prague	O2 Arena (selected games)	2012–2014	17,383	2004	Prague	
Dinamo Minsk
Dinamo Minsk	Bobruisk Arena	2010-2012 (7 games)	7,191	2008	Bobruisk	
Dinamo Riga
Dinamo Riga	Barona Areena	2008 (2 games)	7,017	1999	Espoo	
Dinamo Riga	Liepājas Olympic Center ice arena	2009 (2 games), 2011 (1 game), 2016 (2 games)	2,283	1998	Liepāja	
Dinamo Riga	Tondiraba Ice Hall	2016 (2 games)	7,700	2014	Tallinn	
Dinamo Riga	Inbox.lv ledus halle	2016 (2 games)	2,000	2002	Riga	
Barys Astana
Barys Astana	Ice Palace	2012 (1 game)	12,300	2000	Saint Petersburg	
SKA Saint Petersburg
SKA Saint Petersburg	Siemens Arena	2009 (1 game)	8,750	2004	Vilnius	
SKA Saint Petersburg	Vaillant Arena	2010 (1 game)	7,080	1979	Davos	
Medveščak Zagreb
Medveščak Zagreb	Arena Zagreb (selected games)	2013–2014	15,200	2008	Zagreb	
HC Sochi
HC Sochi	Shayba Arena (selected games)	2017	7,000	2013	Sochi	

== See also ==
- List of VHL arenas
- List of indoor arenas in Russia
