= 2024–25 KHL season =

- League: Kontinental Hockey League
- Sport: Ice hockey
- Duration: 3 September 2024 – 23 March 2025 (regular season)
- Games: 68
- Teams: 23
- TV partner(s): KHL TV, KHL Prime Match TV (Russia); Qazsport (Kazakhstan); Belarus 5 (Belarus); Kinopoisk (streaming partner); Regional broadcasters (local team games only) TNV Tatarstan (Ak Bars Kazan); BST (Salavat Yulaev Ufa); Channel 12 (Avangard Omsk); TV-IN (Metallurg Magnitogorsk); Channel 78 (SKA Saint-Petersburg); Pervy Yaroslavsky (Lokomotiv Yaroslavl); NN 24 (Torpedo Nizhny Novgorod); Guberniya (Amur Khabarovsk); OTV (Traktor Chelyabinsk); OTV Primorye (Admiral Vladivostok); OTS (Sibir Novosibirsk)

Regular season
- Continental Cup winner: Lokomotiv Yaroslavl

Playoffs
- Playoffs MVP: Alexander Radulov
- Finals champions: Lokomotiv Yaroslavl
- Runners-up: Traktor Chelyabinsk

KHL seasons
- ← 2023–24 2025–26 →

The 2024–25 KHL season was the 17th season of the Kontinental Hockey League. There were 23 teams that competed in 68 regular season games, with a record-breaking 187 playing days, between 3 September 2024 and 23 March 2025.

== Season changes ==
For the 2024–25 season, the competition remained unchanged with the number of teams participating and divisional placements. Only minor rule adjustments geared towards encouraging offensive play were introduced.

For the second consecutive season, the regular season had 782 games for a new record-breaking 187 gamedays, with each club played 68 regular season engagements. The regular season featured three breaks, the first after 97 consecutive days of matchplay from 9–16 December 2024, followed by the traditional New Year's break from 31 December to 2 January, lastly followed by the 2025 All-Star Week from 7–10 February. The league maintained the previous season playoff format for the Gagarin Cup playoffs with a cross playoff system in which teams participate in the Conference Quarterfinals before a cross conference switch and re-seeding take place from the second round.

== Teams ==
The 23 teams were split into four divisions: the Bobrov Division and the Tarasov Division as part of the Western Conference, with the Kharlamov Division and the Chernyshev Division as part of the Eastern Conference.

Western Conference		Eastern Conference	
Bobrov Division	Tarasov Division	Kharlamov Division	Chernyshev Division
(Russia) SKA Saint Petersburg	(Russia) CSKA Moscow	(Russia) Ak Bars Kazan	(Russia) Admiral Vladivostok
(Russia) HC Sochi	(Belarus) Dinamo Minsk	(Russia) Avtomobilist Yekaterinburg	(Russia) Amur Khabarovsk
(Russia) Spartak Moscow	(Russia) Dynamo Moscow	(Russia) Lada Togliatti	(Russia) Avangard Omsk
(Russia) Torpedo Nizhny Novgorod	(China) Kunlun Red Star	(Russia) Metallurg Magnitogorsk	(Kazakhstan) Barys Astana
(Russia) Vityaz Moscow Region	(Russia) Lokomotiv Yaroslavl	(Russia) Neftekhimik Nizhnekamsk	(Russia) Salavat Yulaev Ufa
	(Russia) Severstal Cherepovets	(Russia) Traktor Chelyabinsk	(Russia) Sibir Novosibirsk

Each team played 68 games: in the Western Conference team play every other team home-and-away (44 games), plus an additional 20 intra-conference games (10 home and 10 away games). The remaining 4 games were slated against opposition selected with a view to increasing the number of high-profile match-ups (2 home, 2 on the road). In the Eastern Conference team play every other team home-and-away (44 games), plus an additional 22 intra-conference games (11 home and 11 away games). The remaining 2 games were slated against opposition selected with a view to increasing the number of high-profile match-ups (1 home, 1 on the road). Points were awarded for each game, where two points were awarded for all victories, regardless of whether it was in regulation time, in overtime or after game-winning shots. One point was awarded for losing in overtime or game-winning shots, and zero points for losing in regulation time.

== Opening Cup ==
The season started on 3 September 2024 with the Opening cup. The 2024–25 Opening Cup was contested between Metallurg Magnitogorsk the 2023–24 Gagarin Cup Champions and Lokomotiv Yaroslavl the 2023–24 Gagarin Cup runner up.

3 September 2024

Metallurg Magnitogorsk	2–3	Lokomotiv Yaroslavl

Arena Metallurg

== Standings ==
=== Western Conference ===
Pos	Team	Pld	W	OTW	OTL	L	GF	GA	GD	Pts	Qualification
1	Lokomotiv Yaroslavl (O, Q, T, Y, Z)	68	39	10	4	15	191	122	+69	102	Conference winner and Home advantage in Conference Quarterfinals of Gagarin Cup Playoffs
2	Dynamo Moscow (Q)	68	37	5	5	21	204	167	+37	89	Home advantage in Conference Quarterfinals of Gagarin Cup Playoffs
3	Spartak Moscow (Q, B)	68	31	8	9	20	221	197	+24	87	Home advantage in Conference Quarterfinals of Gagarin Cup Playoffs
4	Dinamo Minsk (Q)	68	36	3	8	21	206	161	+45	86	Home advantage in Conference Quarterfinals of Gagarin Cup Playoffs
5	CSKA Moscow (Q)	68	30	8	9	21	194	170	+24	85	Advance to Gagarin Cup Playoffs
6	Severstal Cherepovets (Q)	68	36	5	1	26	200	198	+2	83	Advance to Gagarin Cup Playoffs
7	SKA Saint Petersburg (Q)	68	28	10	6	24	236	205	+31	82	Advance to Gagarin Cup Playoffs
8	Torpedo Nizhny Novgorod (Q)	68	24	7	9	28	204	196	+8	71	Advance to Gagarin Cup Playoffs
9	Kunlun Red Star	68	19	9	6	34	171	235	−64	62	
10	Vityaz Moscow Region	68	19	5	11	33	163	188	−25	59	
11	HC Sochi	68	16	4	7	41	153	226	−73	47	

Source: KHL
Rules for classification: 1) points; 2) games won in regulation time; 3) games won in overtime; 4) games won in shootouts; 5) goal difference; 6) number of goals scored; 7) drawing of lots.
(B) Won Bobrov Division; (O) Won Opening Cup; (Q) Qualified for Gagarin cup playoffs; (T) Won Tarasov Division; (Y) Won Conference; (Z) Won Continental Cup

=== Eastern Conference ===
Pos	Team	Pld	W	OTW	OTL	L	GF	GA	GD	Pts	Qualification
1	Traktor Chelyabinsk (Q, K, Y)	68	38	7	6	17	223	159	+64	96	Conference winner and Home advantage in Conference Quarterfinals of Gagarin Cup Playoffs
2	Salavat Yulaev Ufa (Q, H)	68	33	12	3	20	212	159	+53	93	Home advantage in Conference Quarterfinals of Gagarin Cup Playoffs
3	Metallurg Magnitogorsk (Q)	68	30	13	4	21	197	154	+43	90	Home advantage in Conference Quarterfinals of Gagarin Cup Playoffs
4	Avtomobilist Yekaterinburg (Q)	68	33	8	7	20	178	165	+13	89	Home advantage in Conference Quarterfinals of Gagarin Cup Playoffs
5	Ak Bars Kazan (Q)	68	32	10	3	23	211	162	+49	87	Advance to Gagarin Cup Playoffs
6	Avangard Omsk (Q)	68	31	10	5	22	205	168	+37	87	Advance to Gagarin Cup Playoffs
7	Sibir Novosibirsk (Q)	68	26	3	11	28	171	196	−25	69	Advance to Gagarin Cup Playoffs
8	Admiral Vladivostok (Q)	68	19	9	13	27	184	204	−20	69	Advance to Gagarin Cup Playoffs
9	Neftekhimik Nizhnekamsk	68	20	5	17	26	159	200	−41	67	
10	Lada Togliatti	68	17	5	10	36	150	188	−38	54	
11	Amur Khabarovsk	68	11	7	8	42	150	235	−85	44	
12	Barys Astana	68	8	6	7	47	99	227	−128	35	

Source: KHL
Rules for classification: 1) points; 2) games won in regulation time; 3) games won in overtime; 4) games won in shootouts; 5) goal difference; 6) number of goals
(H) Won Chernyshev Division; (K) Won Kharlamov Division; (Q) Qualified for Gagarin cup playoffs; (Y) Won Conference

=== Continental Cup ===
Pos	Team	Pld	W	OTW	OTL	L	GF	GA	GD	Pts	Qualification
1	Lokomotiv Yaroslavl (O, Q, T, Y, Z)	68	39	10	4	15	191	122	+69	102	Continental Cup winner and first overall seed in Gagarin Cup Playoffs
2	Traktor Chelyabinsk (Q, K, Y)	68	38	7	6	17	223	159	+64	96	
3	Salavat Yulaev Ufa (Q, H)	68	33	12	3	20	212	159	+53	93	
4	Metallurg Magnitogorsk (Q)	68	30	13	4	21	197	154	+43	90	
5	Dynamo Moscow (Q)	68	37	5	5	21	204	167	+37	89	
6	Avtomobilist Yekaterinburg (Q)	68	33	8	7	20	178	165	+13	89	
7	Ak Bars Kazan (Q)	68	32	10	3	23	211	162	+49	87	
8	Avangard Omsk (Q)	68	31	10	5	22	205	168	+37	87	
9	Spartak Moscow (Q, B)	68	31	8	9	20	221	197	+24	87	
10	Dinamo Minsk (Q)	68	36	3	8	21	206	161	+45	86	
11	CSKA Moscow (Q)	68	30	8	9	21	194	170	+24	85	
12	Severstal Cherepovets (Q)	68	36	5	1	26	200	198	+2	83	
13	SKA Saint Petersburg (Q)	68	28	10	6	24	236	205	+31	82	
14	Torpedo Nizhny Novgorod (Q)	68	24	7	9	28	204	196	+8	71	
15	Sibir Novosibirsk (Q)	68	26	3	11	28	171	196	−25	69	
16	Admiral Vladivostok (Q)	68	19	9	13	27	184	204	−20	69	
17	Neftekhimik Nizhnekamsk	68	20	5	17	26	159	200	−41	67	
18	Kunlun Red Star	68	19	9	6	34	171	235	−64	62	
19	Vityaz Moscow Region	68	19	5	11	33	163	188	−25	59	
20	Lada Togliatti	68	17	5	10	36	150	188	−38	54	
21	HC Sochi	68	16	4	7	41	153	226	−73	47	
22	Amur Khabarovsk	68	11	7	8	42	150	235	−85	44	
23	Barys Astana	68	8	6	7	47	99	227	−128	35	

Source: KHL
Rules for classification: 1) points; 2) games won in regulation time; 3) games won in overtime; 4) games won in shootouts; 5) goal difference; 6) number of goals scored; 7) drawing of lots.
(B) Won Bobrov Division; (H) Won Chernyshev Division; (K) Won Kharlamov Division; (O) Won Opening Cup; (Q) Qualified for Gagarin cup playoffs; (T) Won Tarasov Division; (Y) Won Conference; (Z) Won Continental Cup

== Gagarin Cup playoffs ==
The Gagarin Cup playoffs started on 26 March 2025.

=== Bracket ===
Last 16
E1	(Russia) Traktor	4
E8	(Russia) Admiral	2
E2	(Russia) Salavat Yulaev	4
E7	(Russia) Sibir	3
E3	(Russia) Metallurg Mg	2
E6	(Russia) Avangard	4
E4	(Russia) Avtomobilist	3
E5	(Russia) Ak Bars	4
W1	(Russia) Lokomotiv	4
W8	(Russia) Torpedo	0
W2	(Russia) Dynamo Msk	4
W7	(Russia) SKA	2
W3	(Russia) Spartak	4
W6	(Russia) Severstal	1
W4	(Belarus) Dinamo Mn	4
W5	(Russia) CSKA	2

Quarterfinals
E1	(Russia) Traktor	4
W4	(Belarus) Dinamo Mn	1
W2	(Russia) Dynamo Msk	4
E5	(Russia) Ak Bars	2
W1	(Russia) Lokomotiv	4
E6	(Russia) Avangard	3
E2	(Russia) Salavat Yulaev	4
W3	(Russia) Spartak	3

Semifinals
E1	(Russia) Traktor	4
W2	(Russia) Dynamo Msk	1
W1	(Russia) Lokomotiv	4
E2	(Russia) Salavat Yulaev	1

Gagarin Cup Finals
E1	(Russia) Traktor	1
W1	(Russia) Lokomotiv	4

- After the Conference Quarterfinals a conference cross-over and re-seeding commenced
- During the Gagarin Cup Finals the team that finished with higher seed in their conference had home ice (if both teams finished with the same seed the team that earned most points during the regular season had home ice)
- source: KHL

== Final standings ==
Rank	Team
1	(Russia) Lokomotiv Yaroslavl
2	(Russia) Traktor Chelyabinsk
3	(Russia) Salavat Yulaev Ufa
4	(Russia) Dynamo Moscow
5	(Russia) Ak Bars Kazan
6	(Russia) Avangard Omsk
7	(Russia) Spartak Moscow
8	(Belarus) Dinamo Minsk
9	(Russia) Metallurg Magnitogorsk
10	(Russia) Avtomobilist Yekaterinburg
11	(Russia) CSKA Moscow
12	(Russia) Severstal Cherepovets
13	(Russia) SKA Saint Petersburg
14	(Russia) Torpedo Nizhny Novgorod
15	(Russia) Sibir Novosibirsk
16	(Russia) Admiral Vladivostok
17	(Russia) Neftekhimik Nizhnekamsk
18	(China) Kunlun Red Star
19	(Russia) Vityaz Moscow Region
20	(Russia) Lada Togliatti
21	(Russia) HC Sochi
22	(Russia) Amur Khabarovsk
23	(Kazakhstan) Barys Astana

== All-Star Game ==
The 2025 Kontinental Hockey League All-Star Game was hosted at the Sibir Arena in Novosibirsk on February 8-9, 2025.

== Individual awards ==
=== Golden Helmet Award (All-Star Team) ===
Position	Player	Team
G	Vladislav Podyapolsky	Dynamo Moscow/Lada Togliatti
D	Alexander Nikishin	SKA Saint-Petersburg
D	Damir Sharipzyanov	Avangard Omsk
F	Josh Leivo	Salavat Yulaev Ufa
F	Maxim Shabanov	Traktor Chelyabinsk
F	Alexander Radulov	Lokomotiv Yaroslavl

Source: KHL

=== Golden Stick Award (Regular Season MVP) ===
Winner: Josh Leivo (Salavat Yulaev Ufa)

Other nominees: Artyom Galimov (Ak Bars Kazan), Maxim Shabanov (Traktor Chelyabinsk)

=== Alexei Cherepanov Award (Rookie of the Year) ===
Winner: Ivan Demidov (SKA Saint-Petersburg)

Other nominees: Egor Surin (Lokomotiv Yaroslavl), Semyon Vyazovoy (Salavat Yulaev Ufa)

=== Goaltender of the Year ===
Winner: Daniil Isayev (Lokomotiv Yaroslavl)

Other nominees: Vladislav Podyapolsky (Dynamo Moscow/Lada Togliatti), Nikita Serebryakov (Avangard Omsk/SKA Saint-Petersburg)

=== Coach of the Year ===
Winner: Igor Nikitin (Lokomotiv Yaroslavl)

Other nominees: Benoit Groulx (Traktor Chelyabinsk), Viktor Kozlov (Salavat Yulaev Ufa)

=== Scoring achievements ===
Award	Winner	Team	Score
Top Scorer	Josh Leivo	Traktor Chelyabinsk	80 points
Top Sniper	Josh Leivo	Traktor Chelyabinsk	49 goals
Top Scoring Defenceman	Trevor Murphy	Sibir Novosibirsk	58 points
Gagarin Cup Playoffs Top Scorer	Sheldon Rempal	Salavat Yulaev Ufa	21 points
Best +/-	Artyom Galimov	Ak Bars Kazan	+31

=== Other awards ===
Award	Winner	Team
Gagarin Cup Playoffs MVP	Alexander Radulov	Lokomotiv Yaroslavl
Sergei Gimayev Award (For Faith Towards Hockey)	Ilya Kablukov	Avangard Omsk
Valentin Sych Award (Best Executive)	Ivan Savin	Traktor Chelyabinsk

Source: KHL

== See also ==
- 2024–25 Asia League Ice Hockey season
