= 2021–22 KHL season =

Russia-based professional ice hockey league season

- League: Kontinental Hockey League
- Sport: Ice hockey
- Duration: 1 September 2021 – 14 January 2022 (regular season); (curtailed due to the COVID-19 pandemic in Russia); 1 March – 30 April 2022 (playoffs)
- Games: 56
- Teams: 24
- TV partners: Match TV; KHL-TV

Regular season
- Continental Cup winner: Not determined
- Top scorer: Vadim Shipachyov (Dynamo Moscow); (67 points)

Playoffs
- Playoffs MVP: Alexander Popov
- Finals champions: CSKA Moscow
- Runners-up: Metallurg Magnitogorsk

KHL seasons
- ← 2020–21 2022–23 →

The 2021–22 KHL season was the 14th season of the Kontinental Hockey League. There were 24 teams that competed in 56 regular season games, beginning on 1 September 2021 and was scheduled to finish on 1 March 2022. However, the COVID-19 pandemic in Russia resulted in more than 50 games being postponed prior to the break for the 2022 Winter Olympics, and in February, it was announced that no further regular season games would be played following the break. In the finals, CSKA beat Metallurg in seven games.

== Season changes ==
For the 2021–22 season, the competition returned to 24 teams after Admiral Vladivostok returned from a season's hiatus due to the COVID-19 pandemic in Russia affecting their financial status.

There was an additional break during the season due to the 2022 Winter Olympics, held in February in Beijing, China.

== Teams ==
The 24 teams were split into four divisions: the Bobrov Division and the Tarasov Division as part of the Western Conference, with the Kharlamov Division and the Chernyshev Division as part of the Eastern Conference.

Following Admiral Vladivostok's return to the league, Torpedo moved back to the Western Conference and joined the Bobrov Division, with Severstal moving into the Tarasov. Admiral was inserted back into the Chernyshev Division, with Kunlun Red Star moving into the Kharlamov Division.

| Western Conference | | Eastern Conference | |
| Bobrov Division | Tarasov Division | Kharlamov Division | Chernyshev Division |
|---|---|---|---|
| (Finland) Jokerit | (Russia) CSKA Moscow | (Russia) Ak Bars Kazan | (Russia) Admiral Vladivostok |
| (Russia) SKA Saint Petersburg | (Belarus) Dinamo Minsk | (Russia) Avtomobilist Yekaterinburg | (Russia) Amur Khabarovsk |
| (Russia) HC Sochi | (Latvia) Dinamo Riga | (China) Kunlun Red Star | (Russia) Avangard Omsk |
| (Russia) Spartak Moscow | (Russia) Dynamo Moscow | (Russia) Metallurg Magnitogorsk | (Kazakhstan) Barys Nur-Sultan |
| (Russia) Torpedo Nizhny Novgorod | (Russia) Lokomotiv Yaroslavl | (Russia) Neftekhimik Nizhnekamsk | (Russia) Salavat Yulaev Ufa |
| (Russia) Vityaz Podolsk | (Russia) Severstal Cherepovets | (Russia) Traktor Chelyabinsk | (Russia) Sibir Novosibirsk |

== League standings ==
Each team was scheduled to play 56 games: playing every other team home-and-away (46 games), plus additional home-and-away games against five intra-conference teams (10 games). Two points were awarded for victory in each game, regardless of whether it was in regulation time, in overtime or after game-winning shots. One point was awarded for losing in overtime or game-winning shots, and zero points for losing in regulation time. In the 2021–22 season, the second seed in each conference would not be guaranteed to a divisional winner.

With the discontinuation of the regular season, it was proposed that teams were to be ranked by points percentage, with the top eight from each conference scheduled to qualify for the Gagarin Cup playoffs. This was subject to approval by the KHL Board of Directors and the Ice Hockey Federation of Russia. This was confirmed on 16 February.

=== Western Conference ===
| Pos | Team | Pld | W | OTW | OTL | L | GF | GA | GD | PCT | Qualification |
|---|---|---|---|---|---|---|---|---|---|---|---|
| 1 | SKA Saint Petersburg (Y) | 48 | 25 | 6 | 6 | 11 | 146 | 98 | +48 | .708 | Advance to Gagarin Cup Playoffs |
| 2 | Jokerit | 47 | 22 | 7 | 6 | 12 | 143 | 113 | +30 | .681 | Advance to Gagarin Cup Playoffs |
| 3 | CSKA Moscow | 47 | 18 | 11 | 5 | 13 | 120 | 107 | +13 | .670 | Advance to Gagarin Cup Playoffs |
| 4 | Dynamo Moscow | 48 | 26 | 4 | 4 | 14 | 159 | 119 | +40 | .667 | Advance to Gagarin Cup Playoffs |
| 5 | Severstal Cherepovets | 49 | 18 | 10 | 7 | 14 | 129 | 119 | +10 | .643 | Advance to Gagarin Cup Playoffs |
| 6 | Lokomotiv Yaroslavl | 47 | 19 | 4 | 9 | 15 | 113 | 103 | +10 | .585 | Advance to Gagarin Cup Playoffs |
| 7 | Spartak Moscow | 48 | 19 | 7 | 4 | 18 | 122 | 118 | +4 | .583 | Advance to Gagarin Cup Playoffs |
| 8 | Dinamo Minsk | 47 | 18 | 5 | 8 | 16 | 138 | 144 | −6 | .574 | Advance to Gagarin Cup Playoffs |
| 9 | Torpedo Nizhny Novgorod | 47 | 20 | 1 | 7 | 19 | 117 | 113 | +4 | .521 | |
| 10 | Vityaz Podolsk | 48 | 9 | 6 | 13 | 20 | 121 | 149 | −28 | .448 | |
| 11 | HC Sochi | 48 | 13 | 5 | 5 | 25 | 111 | 133 | −22 | .427 | |
| 12 | Dinamo Riga | 45 | 9 | 5 | 9 | 22 | 93 | 143 | −50 | .411 | |

Source: KHL
Rules for classification: 1) points percentage; 2) games won in regulation time; 3) games won in overtime; 4) games won in shootouts; 5) goal difference; 6) number of goals scored; 7) drawing of lots.
(Y) Won conference

=== Eastern Conference ===
| Pos | Team | Pld | W | OTW | OTL | L | GF | GA | GD | PCT | Qualification |
|---|---|---|---|---|---|---|---|---|---|---|---|
| 1 | Metallurg Magnitogorsk (Y) | 48 | 26 | 8 | 3 | 11 | 164 | 120 | +44 | .740 | Advance to Gagarin Cup Playoffs |
| 2 | Traktor Chelyabinsk | 49 | 22 | 12 | 3 | 12 | 152 | 119 | +33 | .724 | Advance to Gagarin Cup Playoffs |
| 3 | Salavat Yulaev Ufa | 45 | 24 | 4 | 6 | 11 | 131 | 96 | +35 | .689 | Advance to Gagarin Cup Playoffs |
| 4 | Ak Bars Kazan | 48 | 21 | 9 | 6 | 12 | 129 | 109 | +20 | .688 | Advance to Gagarin Cup Playoffs |
| 5 | Avangard Omsk | 47 | 24 | 4 | 2 | 17 | 137 | 104 | +33 | .617 | Advance to Gagarin Cup Playoffs |
| 6 | Sibir Novosibirsk | 50 | 18 | 8 | 5 | 19 | 109 | 108 | +1 | .570 | Advance to Gagarin Cup Playoffs |
| 7 | Neftekhimik Nizhnekamsk | 49 | 16 | 6 | 8 | 19 | 121 | 140 | −19 | .531 | Advance to Gagarin Cup Playoffs |
| 8 | Barys Nur-Sultan | 47 | 14 | 8 | 4 | 21 | 127 | 138 | −11 | .511 | Advance to Gagarin Cup Playoffs |
| 9 | Avtomobilist Yekaterinburg | 45 | 15 | 3 | 6 | 21 | 127 | 129 | −2 | .467 | |
| 10 | Amur Khabarovsk | 50 | 12 | 7 | 8 | 23 | 97 | 125 | −28 | .460 | |
| 11 | Admiral Vladivostok | 49 | 11 | 4 | 5 | 29 | 88 | 150 | −62 | .357 | |
| 12 | Kunlun Red Star | 48 | 7 | 2 | 7 | 32 | 101 | 198 | −97 | .260 | |

Source: KHL
Rules for classification: 1) points percentage; 2) games won in regulation time; 3) games won in overtime; 4) games won in shootouts; 5) goal difference; 6) number of goals scored; 7) drawing of lots.
(Y) Won conference

== Gagarin Cup playoffs ==
Following the curtailment of the regular season, the playoffs were brought forward to start from 1 March.

On 25 February 2022, Jokerit announced their withdrawal from the league for the remainder of the season, including the playoffs, due to the Russian invasion of Ukraine. Their first round opponents Spartak Moscow were given four forfeit victories and progressed to the second round of the playoffs. Dinamo Riga subsequently also withdrew from the league for the same reason.

Conference Quarterfinals | Conference Semifinals
1 | (Russia) Metallurg | 4
8 | (Kazakhstan) Barys | 1
1 | (Russia) Metallurg | 4
4 | (Russia) Avangard | 3
2 | (Russia) Traktor | 4
7 | (Russia) Neftekhimik | 0
Eastern Conference
3 | (Russia) Salavat Yulaev | 4
6 | (Russia) Sibir Novosibirsk | 1
2 | (Russia) Traktor | 4
3 | (Russia) Salavat Yulaev | 2
4 | (Russia) Ak Bars | 2
5 | (Russia) Avangard | 4
1 | (Russia) SKA | 4
8 | (Belarus) Dinamo | 0
1 | (Russia) SKA | 4
4 | (Russia) Spartak | 1
2 | (Finland) Jokerit | 0
7 | (Russia) Spartak | 4*
Western Conference
3 | (Russia) CSKA | 4
6 | (Russia) Lokomotiv | 0
2 | (Russia) CSKA | 4
3 | (Russia) Dynamo | 0
4 | (Russia) Dynamo | 4
5 | (Russia) Severstal | 3

Conference Finals
1 | (Russia) Metallurg | 4
2 | (Russia) Traktor | 1
1 | (Russia) SKA | 3
2 | (Russia) CSKA | 4

Gagarin Cup Finals
E1 | (Russia) Metallurg | 3
W2 | (Russia) CSKA | 4

== Statistics ==
=== Scoring leaders ===
The following players led the league in points, at the conclusion of the regular season. If two or more skaters are tied (i.e. same number of points, goals and played games), all of the tied skaters are shown.

| Player | Team | GP | G | A | Pts | +/– | PIM |
|---|---|---|---|---|---|---|---|
| (Russia) Vadim Shipachyov | Dynamo Moscow | 48 | 24 | 43 | 67 | +11 | 47 |
| (Russia) Andrei Kuzmenko | SKA Saint Petersburg | 45 | 20 | 33 | 53 | +15 | 10 |
| (Canada) Corban Knight | Avangard Omsk | 47 | 18 | 30 | 48 | +8 | 21 |
| (Russia) Damir Zhafyarov | Torpedo Nizhny Novgorod | 47 | 18 | 27 | 45 | +9 | 12 |
| (Kazakhstan) Nikita Mikhailis | Barys Nur-Sultan | 47 | 18 | 26 | 44 | +1 | 10 |
| (Finland) Niko Ojamäki | Vityaz Podolsk | 48 | 29 | 14 | 43 | –3 | 6 |
| (Czech Republic) Lukáš Sedlák | Traktor Chelyabinsk | 49 | 18 | 25 | 43 | +19 | 36 |
| (Russia) Stanislav Galiev | Dynamo Moscow | 47 | 25 | 17 | 42 | +5 | 12 |
| (Russia) Anton Burdasov | SKA Saint Petersburg | 41 | 23 | 19 | 42 | +9 | 14 |
| (Finland) Miro Aaltonen | Vityaz Podolsk | 44 | 10 | 32 | 42 | –3 | 10 |

=== Leading goaltenders ===
The following goaltenders led the league in goals against average, at the conclusion of the regular season.

| Player | Team | GP | TOI | W | L | GA | SO | SV% | GAA |
|---|---|---|---|---|---|---|---|---|---|
| (Sweden) Lars Johansson | SKA Saint Petersburg | 34 | 1917:52 | 20 | 9 | 52 | 9 | 93.23% | 1.63 |
| (Finland) Juha Metsola | Salavat Yulaev Ufa | 31 | 1760:53 | 18 | 10 | 55 | 5 | 93.12% | 1.87 |
| (Canada) Edward Pasquale | Lokomotiv Yaroslavl | 38 | 2295:58 | 19 | 16 | 76 | 1 | 91.60% | 1.99 |
| (Russia) Ivan Fedotov | CSKA Moscow | 26 | 1587:14 | 14 | 10 | 53 | 2 | 91.87% | 2.00 |
| (Finland) Harri Säteri | Sibir Novosibirsk | 38 | 2166:48 | 14 | 15 | 73 | 6 | 92.59% | 2.02 |
| (Russia) Timur Bilyalov | Ak Bars Kazan | 34 | 1950:18 | 18 | 10 | 67 | 2 | 91.57% | 2.06 |
| (Russia) Anton Krasotkin | Sibir Novosibirsk | 17 | 865:18 | 8 | 6 | 30 | 2 | 93.10% | 2.08 |
| (Sweden) Anders Lindbäck | Jokerit | 28 | 1621:39 | 15 | 10 | 58 | 2 | 91.29% | 2.15 |
| (Czech Republic) Šimon Hrubec | Avangard Omsk | 40 | 2301:25 | 22 | 15 | 84 | 5 | 92.16% | 2.19 |
| (Russia) Igor Bobkov | Ak Bars Kazan | 16 | 903:09 | 7 | 7 | 33 | 2 | 89.72% | 2.19 |
