= 2023–24 KHL season =

- League: Kontinental Hockey League
- Sport: Ice hockey
- Duration: 1 September 2023 – 26 February 2024 (regular season)
- Games: 68
- Teams: 23
- TV partner(s): KHL TV, KHL Prime Match TV (Russia); Qazsport (Kazakhstan); Belarus 5 (Belarus); Kinopoisk (streaming partner); Regional broadcasters (local team games only) TNV Tatarstan (Ak Bars Kazan); BST (Salavat Yulaev Ufa); Channel 12 (Avangard Omsk); TV-IN (Metallurg Magnitogorsk); Channel 78 (SKA Saint-Petersburg); Pervy Yaroslavsky (Lokomotiv Yaroslavl); NN 24 (Torpedo Nizhny Novgorod); Guberniya (Amur Khabarovsk); OTV (Traktor Chelyabinsk); OTV Primorye (Admiral Vladivostok); OTS (Sibir Novosibirsk)

Regular season
- Continental Cup winner: HC Dynamo Moscow
- Season MVP: Nikita Gusev (HC Dynamo Moscow); (89 points)

Playoffs
- Playoffs MVP: Ilya Nabokov
- Finals champions: Metallurg Magnitogorsk
- Runners-up: Lokomotiv Yaroslavl

KHL seasons
- ← 2022–23 2024–25 →

The 2023–24 KHL season was the 16th season of the Kontinental Hockey League. There were 23 teams that competed in 68 regular season games, with a record-breaking 165 playing days, having begun on 1 September 2023 and ended on 26 February 2024.

In the Finals, Metallurg Magnitogorsk completed the series sweep against Lokomotiv Yaroslavl to win their third Gagarin Cup trophy.

== Season changes ==
For the 2023–24 season, the competition welcomed the return of Lada Togliatti, marking their third stint in the KHL having last played in the league in 2018.

The regular season was expanded to feature 782 games scheduled for a record-breaking 165 gamedays, with each club to play 68 regular season engagements. The regular season had just one break, from 8–18 December 2023 in which the 2023 All-Star Week took place. For the first time the league changed the playoff format for the Gagarin Cup playoffs by introducing a cross playoff system in which teams participated in the Conference Quarterfinals before a cross conference switch and re-seeding took place from the second round.

== Teams ==
The 23 teams are split into four divisions: the Bobrov Division and the Tarasov Division as part of the Western Conference, with the Kharlamov Division and the Chernyshev Division as part of the Eastern Conference.

Lada Togliatti was assigned to play in the Kharlamov Division in the Eastern Conference with every other participant remaining in their previous season allotment.

Western Conference		Eastern Conference	
Bobrov Division	Tarasov Division	Kharlamov Division	Chernyshev Division
(Russia) SKA Saint Petersburg	(Russia) CSKA Moscow	(Russia) Ak Bars Kazan	(Russia) Admiral Vladivostok
(Russia) HC Sochi	(Belarus) Dinamo Minsk	(Russia) Avtomobilist Yekaterinburg	(Russia) Amur Khabarovsk
(Russia) Spartak Moscow	(Russia) Dynamo Moscow	(Russia) Lada Togliatti	(Russia) Avangard Omsk
(Russia) Torpedo Nizhny Novgorod	(China) Kunlun Red Star	(Russia) Metallurg Magnitogorsk	(Kazakhstan) Barys Astana
(Russia) Vityaz Moscow Region	(Russia) Lokomotiv Yaroslavl	(Russia) Neftekhimik Nizhnekamsk	(Russia) Salavat Yulaev Ufa
	(Russia) Severstal Cherepovets	(Russia) Traktor Chelyabinsk	(Russia) Sibir Novosibirsk

Each team plays 68 games: in the Western Conference team play every other team home-and-away (44 games), plus an additional 20 intra-conference games (10 home and 10 away games). The remaining 4 games were slated against opposition selected with a view to increasing the number of high-profile match-ups (2 home, 2 on the road). In the Eastern Conference team play every other team home-and-away (44 games), plus an additional 22 intra-conference games (11 home and 11 away games). The remaining 2 games were slated against opposition selected with a view to increasing the number of high-profile match-ups (1 home, 1 on the road). Points were awarded for each game, where two points were awarded for all victories, regardless of whether it was in regulation time, in overtime or after game-winning shots. One point was awarded for losing in overtime or game-winning shots, and zero points for losing in regulation time.

== Opening Cup ==
The 2023-24 KHL season started on 1 September 2023 with the Opening cup. The 2023–24 Opening Cup was contested between CSKA Moscow the 2022-23 Gagarin Cup Champions and Ak Bars Kazan the 2022-23 Gagarin Cup runner up.

1 September 2023

CSKA Moscow	2–5	Ak Bars Kazan

CSKA Arena, Moscow

== Standings ==
=== Western Conference ===
Pos	Team	Pld	W	OTW	OTL	L	GF	GA	GD	Pts	
1	Dynamo Moscow (Z, T)	68	31	15	6	16	215	160	+55	98	Conference winner and Home advantage in Conference Quarterfinals of Gagarin Cup Playoffs
2	SKA Saint Petersburg (B)	68	40	6	3	19	220	139	+81	95	Home advantage in Conference Quarterfinals of Gagarin Cup Playoffs
3	Lokomotiv Yaroslavl	68	34	10	5	19	174	139	+35	93	Home advantage in Conference Quarterfinals of Gagarin Cup Playoffs
4	Spartak Moscow	68	36	4	8	20	233	189	+44	88	Home advantage in Conference Quarterfinals of Gagarin Cup Playoffs
5	Severstal Cherepovets	68	30	6	8	24	203	185	+18	80	Advance to Gagarin Cup Playoffs
6	CSKA Moscow	68	30	4	8	26	193	166	+27	76	Advance to Gagarin Cup Playoffs
7	Torpedo Nizhny Novgorod	68	27	7	7	27	189	180	+9	75	Advance to Gagarin Cup Playoffs
8	Dinamo Minsk	68	26	6	5	31	180	178	+2	69	Advance to Gagarin Cup Playoffs
9	Kunlun Red Star	68	15	10	6	37	159	222	−63	56	
10	HC Sochi	68	19	4	7	38	168	254	−86	53	
11	Vityaz Moscow Region	68	14	6	8	40	133	224	−91	48	

Source: KHL
Rules for classification: 1) points; 2) games won in regulation time; 3) games won in overtime; 4) games won in shootouts; 5) goal difference; 6) number of goals scored; 7) drawing of lots.
(B) Won Bobrov Division; (T) Won Tarasov Division; (Z) Won Continental Cup

=== Eastern Conference ===
Pos	Team	Pld	W	OTW	OTL	L	GF	GA	GD	Pts	
1	Metallurg Magnitogorsk (C, Y, K)	68	35	9	7	17	212	167	+45	95	Conference winner and Home advantage in Conference Quarterfinals of Gagarin Cup Playoffs
2	Avangard Omsk (H)	68	31	12	6	19	211	181	+30	92	Home advantage in Conference Quarterfinals of Gagarin Cup Playoffs
3	Salavat Yulaev Ufa	68	36	6	6	20	196	143	+53	90	Home advantage in Conference Quarterfinals of Gagarin Cup Playoffs
4	Ak Bars Kazan (O)	68	33	8	2	25	175	140	+35	84	Home advantage in Conference Quarterfinals of Gagarin Cup Playoffs
5	Avtomobilist Yekaterinburg	68	26	11	8	23	163	157	+6	82	Advance to Gagarin Cup Playoffs
6	Traktor Chelyabinsk	68	27	10	6	25	182	167	+15	80	Advance to Gagarin Cup Playoffs
7	Lada Togliatti	68	24	8	14	22	165	170	−5	78	Advance to Gagarin Cup Playoffs
8	Amur Khabarovsk	68	23	6	13	26	159	178	−19	71	Advance to Gagarin Cup Playoffs
9	Neftekhimik Nizhnekamsk	68	20	7	15	26	158	200	−42	69	
10	Sibir Novosibirsk	68	20	8	11	29	148	180	−32	67	
11	Admiral Vladivostok	68	14	7	12	35	148	197	−49	54	
12	Barys Astana	68	12	9	8	39	137	205	−68	50	

Source: KHL
Rules for classification: 1) points; 2) games won in regulation time; 3) games won in overtime; 4) games won in shootouts; 5) goal difference; 6) number of goals scored; 7) drawing of lots.
(C) 2023-24 Gagarin Cup Champions; (H) Won Chernyshev Division; (K) Won Kharlamov Division; (O) Won Opening Cup; (Y) Won Conference

=== Continental Cup ===
Pos	Team	Pld	W	OTW	OTL	L	GF	GA	GD	Pts	
1	Dynamo Moscow (Z)	68	31	15	6	16	215	160	+55	98	Continental Cup winner and first overall seed in Gagarin Cup Playoffs
2	SKA Saint Petersburg	68	40	6	3	19	220	139	+81	95	
3	Metallurg Magnitogorsk (C)	68	35	9	7	17	212	167	+45	95	2023-24 Gagarin Cup Champions
4	Lokomotiv Yaroslavl	68	34	10	5	19	174	139	+35	93	
5	Avangard Omsk	68	31	12	6	19	211	181	+30	92	
6	Salavat Yulaev Ufa	68	36	6	6	20	196	143	+53	90	
7	Spartak Moscow	68	36	4	8	20	233	189	+44	88	
8	Ak Bars Kazan (O)	68	33	8	2	25	175	140	+35	84	2023-24 Opening Cup winner
9	Avtomobilist Yekaterinburg	68	26	11	8	23	163	157	+6	82	
10	Severstal Cherepovets	68	30	6	8	24	203	185	+18	80	
11	Traktor Chelyabinsk	68	27	10	6	25	182	167	+15	80	
12	Lada Togliatti	68	24	8	14	22	165	170	−5	78	
13	CSKA Moscow	68	30	4	8	26	193	166	+27	76	
14	Torpedo Nizhny Novgorod	68	27	7	7	27	189	180	+9	75	
15	Amur Khabarovsk	68	23	6	13	26	159	178	−19	71	
16	Dinamo Minsk	68	26	6	5	31	180	178	+2	69	
17	Neftekhimik Nizhnekamsk	68	20	7	15	26	158	200	−42	69	
18	Sibir Novosibirsk	68	20	8	11	29	148	180	−32	67	
19	Kunlun Red Star	68	15	10	6	37	159	222	−63	56	
20	Admiral Vladivostok	68	14	7	12	35	148	197	−49	54	
21	HC Sochi	68	19	4	7	38	168	254	−86	53	
22	Barys Astana	68	12	9	8	39	137	205	−68	50	
23	Vityaz Moscow Region	68	14	6	8	40	133	224	−91	48	

Source: KHL
Rules for classification: 1) points; 2) games won in regulation time; 3) games won in overtime; 4) games won in shootouts; 5) goal difference; 6) number of goals scored; 7) drawing of lots.
(C) 2023-24 Gagarin Cup Champions; (O) Won Opening Cup; (Z) Won Continental Cup

== Gagarin Cup playoffs ==
The Gagarin Cup playoffs started on 29 February 2024. Metallurg Magnitogorsk won the Gagarin Cup on 24 April 2024 by sweeping the finals series.

=== Bracket ===
Last 16
E1	(Russia) Metallurg Mg	4
E8	(Russia) Amur	2
E2	(Russia) Avangard	4
E7	(Russia) Lada	1
E3	(Russia) Salavat Yulaev	2
E6	(Russia) Traktor	4
E4	(Russia) Ak Bars	1
E5	(Russia) Avtomobilist	4
W1	(Russia) Dynamo Msk	4
W8	(Belarus) Dinamo Mn	2
W2	(Russia) SKA	4
W7	(Russia) Torpedo	1
W3	(Russia) Lokomotiv	4
W6	(Russia) CSKA	1
W4	(Russia) Spartak	4
W5	(Russia) Severstal	1

Quarterfinals
E1	(Russia) Metallurg Mg	4
W4	(Russia) Spartak	2
W2	(Russia) SKA	1
E5	(Russia) Avtomobilist	4
W1	(Russia) Dynamo Msk	0
E6	(Russia) Traktor	4
E2	(Russia) Avangard	3
W3	(Russia) Lokomotiv	4

Semifinals
E1	(Russia) Metallurg Mg	4
E5	(Russia) Avtomobilist	3
W3	(Russia) Lokomotiv	4
E6	(Russia) Traktor	0

Gagarin Cup Finals
E1	(Russia) Metallurg Mg	4
W3	(Russia) Lokomotiv	0

- After the Conference Quarterfinals a conference cross-over and re-seeding commenced
- During the Gagarin Cup Finals the team that finished with higher seed in their conference had home ice (if both teams finished with the same seed the team that earned most points during the regular season had home ice)
- source: KHL
