= 2019–20 KHL season =

Russia-based professional ice hockey league season

- League: Kontinental Hockey League
- Sport: Ice hockey
- Duration: 1 September 2019 – 12 March 2020
- Games: 62
- Teams: 24

Regular season
- Continental Cup winner: CSKA Moscow
- Top scorer: Vadim Shipachyov (Dynamo Moscow); (65 points)

KHL seasons
- ← 2018–19 2020–21 →

The 2019–20 KHL season was the 12th season of the Kontinental Hockey League. There were 24 teams that competed in 62 regular season games. The season began with the Opening Cup on 1 September 2019, and the regular championship ran until 27 February 2020. The playoffs were scheduled to take place from 1 March through until 30 April. The All-Star Weekend took place over 18–19 January 2020.

Due to the 2020 coronavirus pandemic in Europe, the season was prematurely ended on 25 March 2020, midway through the playoffs.

The Russian Hockey Federation declared CSKA Moscow the Russian champions, SKA Saint Petersburg and Ak Bars Kazan silver medalists, and Dynamo Moscow bronze medalists based on regular season standings.

== Season changes ==
For the 2019–20 season, the KHL originally announced that all 25 teams from the 2018–19 would return and continue without any changes to Divisions realignments. However the competition was reduced to 24 teams after Slovak based, HC Slovan Bratislava, announced that they would be withdrawing from the KHL to return to the Slovak Extraliga due to financial restrictions on 27 May 2019. With Slovan Bratislava's exit, Torpedo Nizhny Novgorod were moved from the Eastern Conference, to the Western Conference, reversing the move of the previous season. As a result, both Conferences consisted of 12 teams.

=== KHL World Games ===
The KHL announced the World Games project would continue for a second consecutive season with more information to be announced in July 2019. With the release of the season's schedule, new destinations of Davos, Shenzhen and Almaty were scheduled to host games.

=== Smart pucks ===
Smart puck technology, backed up with chips in players' jerseys, was used in all KHL games in the coming season. The new technology was trialled in the All-Star Game in Kazan last season and was also used in regular season games in Helsinki. Every arena in the league installed sensors capable of collecting information from the chips 100 times a second. That information was available to various users and coaches in real time, giving-up-to-the-second details of the players’ speed, the distance covered in each shift, the speed and location of each shot and much more.

The KHL is the first league in the world to implement this technology across the board.

== Teams ==
The 24 teams were split into four divisions: the Bobrov Division and the Tarasov Division as part of the Western Conference, with the Kharlamov Division and the Chernyshev Division as part of the Eastern Conference.

Western Conference		Eastern Conference	
Bobrov Division	Tarasov Division	Kharlamov Division	Chernyshev Division
(Latvia) Dinamo Riga	(Russia) CSKA Moscow	(Russia) Ak Bars Kazan	(Russia) Admiral Vladivostok
(Russia) Dynamo Moscow	(Belarus) Dinamo Minsk	(Russia) Avtomobilist Yekaterinburg	(Russia) Amur Khabarovsk
(Finland) Jokerit	(Russia) HC Sochi	(Russia) Metallurg Magnitogorsk	(Russia) Avangard Omsk
(Russia) Severstal Cherepovets	(Russia) Lokomotiv Yaroslavl	(Russia) Neftekhimik Nizhnekamsk	(Kazakhstan) Barys Nur-Sultan
(Russia) SKA Saint Petersburg	(Russia) Torpedo Nizhny Novgorod	(Russia) Sibir Novosibirsk	(China) Kunlun Red Star
(Russia) Spartak Moscow	(Russia) Vityaz Podolsk	(Russia) Traktor Chelyabinsk	(Russia) Salavat Yulaev Ufa

== League standings ==
Each team played 62 games, playing their divisional opponents four times, non-divisional conference rivals three times, and non-conference opponents twice.

Points were awarded for each game, where two points were awarded for all victories, regardless of whether it was in regulation time, in overtime or after game-winning shots. One point was awarded for losing in overtime or game-winning shots, and zero points for losing in regulation time. At the end of the regular season, the team that finished with the most points was crowned the Continental Cup winner.

=== Western Conference ===
Pos	Team	Pld	W	OTW	OTL	L	GF	GA	GD	Pts	Qualification
1	CSKA Moscow (Q, Z)	62	40	5	4	13	202	99	+103	94	Advance to Gagarin Cup Playoffs (Note: Teams leading a division hold one of the first two places of their conference.)
2	SKA Saint Petersburg (Q, X)	62	30	14	5	13	179	118	+61	93	Advance to Gagarin Cup Playoffs
3	Jokerit (Q)	62	28	10	8	16	184	164	+20	84	Advance to Gagarin Cup Playoffs
4	Dynamo Moscow (Q)	62	29	8	8	17	182	144	+38	82	Advance to Gagarin Cup Playoffs
5	Spartak Moscow (Q)	62	26	8	9	19	173	143	+30	77	Advance to Gagarin Cup Playoffs
6	Lokomotiv Yaroslavl (Q)	62	25	9	5	23	170	151	+19	73	Advance to Gagarin Cup Playoffs
7	Vityaz Podolsk (Q)	62	19	8	11	24	137	166	−29	65	Advance to Gagarin Cup Playoffs
8	Torpedo Nizhny Novgorod (Q)	62	22	7	6	27	165	167	−2	64	Advance to Gagarin Cup Playoffs
9	HC Sochi (E)	62	15	10	9	28	124	164	−40	59	
10	Severstal Cherepovets (E)	62	14	10	10	28	126	171	−45	58	
11	Dinamo Riga (E)	62	11	6	7	38	103	187	−84	41	
12	Dinamo Minsk (E)	62	11	3	11	37	135	232	−97	39	

Source: KHL
Rules for classification: 1) points; 2) games won in regulation time; 3) games won in overtime; 4) games won in shootouts; 5) goal difference; 6) number of goals scored; 7) drawing of lots.
(E) Eliminated; (Q) Qualified to the phase indicated; (X) Won division; (Z) Won Continental Cup

=== Eastern Conference ===
Pos	Team	Pld	W	OTW	OTL	L	GF	GA	GD	Pts	Qualification
1	Ak Bars Kazan (Q, Y)	62	38	6	5	13	178	121	+57	93	Advance to Gagarin Cup Playoffs (Note: Teams leading a division hold one of the first two places of their conference.)
2	Barys Nur-Sultan (Q, X)	62	31	7	8	16	156	137	+19	84	Advance to Gagarin Cup Playoffs
3	Avangard Omsk (Q)	62	30	7	9	16	163	120	+43	83	Advance to Gagarin Cup Playoffs
4	Avtomobilist Yekaterinburg (Q)	62	24	11	8	19	168	151	+17	78	Advance to Gagarin Cup Playoffs
5	Sibir Novosibirsk (Q)	62	27	7	6	22	139	143	−4	74	Advance to Gagarin Cup Playoffs
6	Salavat Yulaev Ufa (Q)	62	23	6	10	23	153	144	+9	68	Advance to Gagarin Cup Playoffs
7	Metallurg Magnitogorsk (Q)	62	20	8	9	25	138	145	−7	65	Advance to Gagarin Cup Playoffs
8	Neftekhimik Nizhnekamsk (Q)	62	21	7	8	26	162	158	+4	64	Advance to Gagarin Cup Playoffs
9	Amur Khabarovsk (E)	62	20	6	10	26	132	145	−13	62	
10	Kunlun Red Star (E)	62	20	6	8	28	139	158	−19	60	
11	Traktor Chelyabinsk (E)	62	20	5	6	31	132	161	−29	56	
12	Admiral Vladivostok (E)	62	16	10	4	32	126	177	−51	56	

Source: KHL
Rules for classification: 1) points; 2) games won in regulation time; 3) games won in overtime; 4) games won in shootouts; 5) goal difference; 6) number of goals scored; 7) drawing of lots.
(E) Eliminated; (Q) Qualified to the phase indicated; (X) Won division; (Y) Won conference

== Gagarin Cup playoffs ==
Ak Bars Kazan were the Eastern Conference regular season winners with 93 points. It was determined following a 5–3 victory over closest challengers Avangard Omsk at TatNeft Arena. CSKA Moscow were the Western Conference regular season winners, and winners of the Continental Cup with 94 points. It was determined following a 6–0 victory over HC Sochi at CSKA Arena.

Conference Quarterfinals	Conference Semifinals
1	(Russia) Ak Bars	4
8	(Russia) Neftekhimik	0
1	(Russia) Ak Bars
6	(Russia) Salavat Yulaev
2	(Kazakhstan) Barys	4
7	(Russia) Metallurg	1
Eastern Conference
3	(Russia) Avangard	2
6	(Russia) Salavat Yulaev	4
2	(Kazakhstan) Barys (Note: On 16 March 2020, Barys voluntarily withdrew from the playoffs due to the COVID-19 pandemic.)
5	(Russia) Sibir	w/o
4	(Russia) Avtomobilist	1
5	(Russia) Sibir	4
1	(Russia) CSKA	4
8	(Russia) Torpedo	0
1	(Russia) CSKA
4	(Russia) Dynamo
2	(Russia) SKA	4
7	(Russia) Vityaz	0
Western Conference
3	(Finland) Jokerit	4
6	(Russia) Lokomotiv	2
2	(Russia) SKA	w/o
3	(Finland) Jokerit (Note: On 14 March 2020, Jokerit voluntarily withdrew from the playoffs due to the COVID-19 pandemic.)
4	(Russia) Dynamo	4
5	(Russia) Spartak	2

Conference Finals
(Russia)
5	(Russia) Sibir
(Russia)
2	(Russia) SKA

Gagarin Cup Finals
E	(Russia)
W	(Russia)

== Final standings ==
Following the announcement that the season was prematurely ended on 25 March 2020, a decision of the final league standings was announced to be made at a later date. On 7 May 2020, it was announced that the eight teams that had qualified for the second round of the playoffs would be ranked ex aequo.

At the same time, the Russian Hockey Federation declared CSKA Moscow the Russian champions, SKA Saint Petersburg and Ak Bars Kazan silver medalists, and Dynamo Moscow bronze medalists based on regular season standings.

Rank	Team
1–8	(Russia) Ak Bars Kazan
1–8	(Kazakhstan) Barys Nur-Sultan
1–8	(Russia) CSKA Moscow
1–8	(Russia) Dynamo Moscow
1–8	(Finland) Jokerit
1–8	(Russia) Salavat Yulaev Ufa
1–8	(Russia) Sibir Novosibirsk
1–8	(Russia) SKA Saint Petersburg
9	(Russia) Avangard Omsk
10	(Russia) Avtomobilist Yekaterinburg
11	(Russia) Spartak Moscow
12	(Russia) Lokomotiv Yaroslavl
13	(Russia) Metallurg Magnitogorsk
14	(Russia) Vityaz Podolsk
15	(Russia) Torpedo Nizhny Novgorod
16	(Russia) Neftekhimik Nizhnekamsk
17	(Russia) Amur Khabarovsk
18	(China) Kunlun Red Star
19	(Russia) HC Sochi
20	(Russia) Severstal Cherepovets
21	(Russia) Traktor Chelyabinsk
22	(Russia) Admiral Vladivostok
23	(Latvia) Dinamo Riga
24	(Belarus) Dinamo Minsk

== Statistics ==
=== Scoring leaders ===
The following players led the league in points, at the conclusion of the regular season. If two or more skaters are tied (i.e. same number of points, goals and played games), all of the tied skaters are shown.

Player	Team	GP	G	A	Pts	+/–	PIM
(Russia) Vadim Shipachyov	Dynamo Moscow	61	17	48	65	+34	28
(Czech Republic) Dmitrij Jaškin	Dynamo Moscow	58	31	32	63	+34	75
(Russia) Kirill Kaprizov	CSKA Moscow	57	33	29	62	+32	10
(Sweden) Linus Omark	Salavat Yulaev Ufa	59	12	42	54	–1	36
(Kazakhstan) Nigel Dawes	Avtomobilist Yekaterinburg	59	20	30	50	–5	13
(Finland) Mikko Lehtonen	Jokerit	60	17	32	49	+26	20
(Russia) Nikita Soshnikov	Salavat Yulaev Ufa	58	27	21	48	–2	28
(United States) Brian O'Neill	Jokerit	56	19	29	48	+17	18
(Canada) Linden Vey	CSKA Moscow	52	13	35	48	+22	47
(Germany) Brooks Macek	Avtomobilist Yekaterinburg	61	24	22	46	-3	22

=== Leading goaltenders ===
The following goaltenders led the league in goals against average, at the conclusion of the regular season.

Player	Team(s)	GP	TOI	W	L	GA	SO	SV%	GAA
(Sweden) Lars Johansson	CSKA Moscow	23	1370:30	17	6	32	6	93.25%	1.40
(Russia) Timur Bilyalov	Ak Bars Kazan	32	1652:14	19	4	40	8	94.34%	1.45
(Russia) Ilya Sorokin	CSKA Moscow	40	2364:49	26	10	59	9	93.50%	1.50
(Russia) Alexander Samonov	Vityaz Podolsk; SKA Saint Petersburg	25	1428:32	19	1	36	4	94.66%	1.51
(Sweden) Magnus Hellberg	SKA Saint Petersburg	26	1443:15	14	7	41	3	92.65%	1.70
(Russia) Igor Bobkov	Avangard Omsk	48	2815:51	25	16	81	5	93.24%	1.73
(Russia) Vasily Koshechkin	Metallurg Magnitogorsk	49	2687:12	18	20	87	6	93.31%	1.94
(Russia) Ivan Bocharov	Dynamo Moscow	49	2638:43	26	13	87	6	93.47%	1.98
(Russia) Alexei Krasikov	Sibir Novosibirsk	30	1403:56	10	11	47	2	93.52%	2.01
(Russia) Evgeny Alikin	Amur Khabarovsk	40	2246:36	15	13	76	7	93.65%	2.03

== Awards ==
=== Players of the Month ===
Best KHL players of each month.

Month	Goaltender	Defence	Forward	Rookie
September	(Russia) Alexei Melnichuk (SKA Saint Petersburg)	(Sweden) Mikael Wikstrand (Ak Bars Kazan)	(Russia) Damir Zhafyarov (Torpedo Nizhny Novgorod)	(Russia) Danila Zhuravlyov (Ak Bars Kazan)
October	(Finland) Harri Säteri (Sibir Novosibirsk)	(Russia) Albert Yarullin (Ak Bars Kazan)	(Russia) Vadim Shipachyov (Dynamo Moscow)	(Russia) Artyom Galimov (Ak Bars Kazan)
November	(Russia) Timur Bilyalov (Ak Bars Kazan)	(Finland) Mikko Lehtonen (Jokerit)	(Czech Republic) Dmitrij Jaškin (Dynamo Moscow)	(Russia) Kirill Marchenko (SKA Saint Petersburg)
December	(Czech Republic) Jakub Kovář (Avtomobilist Yekaterinburg)	(Finland) Mikko Lehtonen (Jokerit)	(Kazakhstan) Roman Starchenko (Barys Nur-Sultan)	(Russia) Akim Trishin (Spartak Moscow)
January	(Russia) Ilya Sorokin (CSKA Moscow)	(Finland) Mikko Lehtonen (Jokerit)	(Russia) Anton Slepyshev (CSKA Moscow)	(Russia) Ivan Morozov (CSKA Moscow)
February	(Russia) Ivan Fedotov (Traktor Chelyabinsk)	(Russia) Vasili Tokranov (SKA Saint Petersburg)	(Russia) Kirill Kaprizov (CSKA Moscow)	(Russia) Dmitri Voronkov (Ak Bars Kazan)
March	Not awarded			
April	Not awarded			

== Attendances ==
#	Ice hockey club	Average attendance
1	SKA Saint Petersburg	13,531
2	HC Dinamo Minsk	10,699
3	Jokerit	8,841
4	HC Spartak Moscow	8,776
5	HC CSKA Moscow	7,971
6	Ak Bars Kazan	7,187
7	HC Barys	7,131
8	Lokomotiv Yaroslavl	6,844
9	Metallurg Magnitogorsk	6,805
10	Salavat Yulaev Ufa	6,785
11	HC Sibir Novosibirsk	6,678
12	HC Dynamo Moscow	6,490
13	Traktor Chelyabinsk	6,437
14	HC Sochi	6,374
15	Dinamo Riga	5,865
16	Torpedo Nizhny Novgorod	5,389
17	Amur Khabarovsk	5,352
18	Avtomobilist Yekaterinburg	5,327
19	Avangard Omsk	4,598
20	HC Vityaz	4,301
21	Severstal Cherepovets	4,145
22	Admiral Vladivostok	3,957
23	HC Neftekhimik Nizhnekamsk	3,571
24	Kunlun Red Star	3,247
