= 2020–21 KHL season =

Russia-based professional ice hockey league season

- League: Kontinental Hockey League
- Sport: Ice hockey
- Duration: 2 September 2020 – 27 February 2021 (regular season); 2 March – 28 April 2021 (playoffs)
- Games: 60
- Teams: 23

Regular season
- Continental Cup winner: CSKA Moscow (91 points)
- Top scorer: Vadim Shipachyov (Dynamo Moscow); (66 points)

Playoffs
- Western champions: CSKA Moscow
- Western runners-up: SKA Saint Petersburg
- Eastern champions: Avangard Omsk
- Eastern runners-up: Ak Bars Kazan
- Finals champions: Avangard Omsk
- Runners-up: CSKA Moscow

KHL seasons
- ← 2019–20 2021–22 →

The 2020–21 KHL season was the 13th season of the Kontinental Hockey League. There were 23 teams that competed in 60 regular season games, beginning on 2 September 2020 and finishing on 27 February 2021. The playoffs were held from 2 March, culminating in Game 6 of the Gagarin Cup Finals on 28 April. Avangard Omsk won their first Gagarin Cup title, avenging their sweep in the finals of the 2019 Gagarin Cup playoffs, defeating CSKA Moscow by 4 games to 2.

== Season changes ==
For the 2020–21 season, the competition was reduced to 23 teams after Admiral Vladivostok took a hiatus for the season due to the COVID-19 pandemic in Russia affecting their financial status.

With pre-season events returning to the schedule in August as a part of preparations to start the season, Jokerit, whose ability to stage games was governed by Finland's restrictions in response to the coronavirus pandemic, announced that it expected to play before a reduced audience at the Hartwall Arena during the first month of the campaign.

Due to the on-going travel restrictions against the COVID-19 pandemic, Kunlun Red Star determined that they would be unable to play in Wukesong Arena situated in Beijing, China for this season. In August, the club signed a contract to play out of Mytishchi Arena, the second venue for the 2007 Men's Ice Hockey World Championships located on the outskirts of Moscow.

== Teams ==
The 23 teams were split into four divisions: the Bobrov Division and the Tarasov Division as part of the Western Conference, with the Kharlamov Division and the Chernyshev Division as part of the Eastern Conference.

Following Admiral Vladivostok's hiatus from the league, and to alleviate any potential issues with teams transiting during the COVID-19 pandemic, several conference and divisional changes were announced.

| Western Conference | | Eastern Conference | |
| Bobrov Division | Tarasov Division | Kharlamov Division | Chernyshev Division |
|---|---|---|---|
| (Finland) Jokerit | (Russia) CSKA Moscow | (Russia) Ak Bars Kazan | (Russia) Amur Khabarovsk |
| (Russia) Severstal Cherepovets | (Belarus) Dinamo Minsk | (Russia) Avtomobilist Yekaterinburg | (Russia) Avangard Omsk |
| (Russia) SKA Saint Petersburg | (Latvia) Dinamo Riga | (Russia) Metallurg Magnitogorsk | (Kazakhstan) Barys Nur-Sultan |
| (Russia) HC Sochi | (Russia) Dynamo Moscow | (Russia) Neftekhimik Nizhnekamsk | (China) Kunlun Red Star |
| (Russia) Spartak Moscow | (Russia) Lokomotiv Yaroslavl | (Russia) Torpedo Nizhny Novgorod | (Russia) Salavat Yulaev Ufa |
| (Russia) Vityaz Podolsk | | (Russia) Traktor Chelyabinsk | (Russia) Sibir Novosibirsk |

== League standings ==
Each team played 60 games: playing every other team home-and-away (44 games), 8–10 games against division rivals and 6–8 games against teams in the other division in their respective conference.

Points were awarded for each game, where two points were awarded for all victories, regardless of whether it is in regulation time, in overtime or after game-winning shots. One point was awarded for losing in overtime or game-winning shots, and zero points for losing in regulation time. At the end of the regular season, the team that finished with the most points was crowned the Continental Cup winner.

=== Western Conference ===
| Pos | Team | Pld | W | OTW | OTL | L | GF | GA | GD | Pts | Qualification |
|---|---|---|---|---|---|---|---|---|---|---|---|
| 1 | CSKA Moscow (Z) | 60 | 34 | 9 | 5 | 12 | 182 | 121 | +61 | 91 | Advance to Gagarin Cup Playoffs (Note: Teams leading a division hold one of the first two places of their conference.) |
| 2 | SKA Saint Petersburg (X) | 60 | 33 | 4 | 8 | 15 | 178 | 126 | +52 | 82 | Advance to Gagarin Cup Playoffs |
| 3 | Dynamo Moscow | 60 | 34 | 5 | 6 | 15 | 195 | 137 | +58 | 84 | Advance to Gagarin Cup Playoffs |
| 4 | Lokomotiv Yaroslavl | 60 | 30 | 8 | 7 | 15 | 181 | 126 | +55 | 83 | Advance to Gagarin Cup Playoffs |
| 5 | Jokerit | 60 | 26 | 6 | 9 | 19 | 174 | 153 | +21 | 73 | Advance to Gagarin Cup Playoffs |
| 6 | Severstal Cherepovets | 60 | 23 | 9 | 4 | 24 | 149 | 159 | −10 | 68 | Advance to Gagarin Cup Playoffs |
| 7 | Dinamo Minsk | 60 | 17 | 15 | 3 | 25 | 167 | 174 | −7 | 67 | Advance to Gagarin Cup Playoffs |
| 8 | Spartak Moscow | 60 | 20 | 8 | 7 | 25 | 157 | 173 | −16 | 63 | Advance to Gagarin Cup Playoffs |
| 9 | Vityaz Podolsk | 60 | 21 | 6 | 5 | 28 | 155 | 175 | −20 | 59 | |
| 10 | HC Sochi | 60 | 12 | 2 | 9 | 37 | 121 | 202 | −81 | 37 | |
| 11 | Dinamo Riga | 60 | 5 | 4 | 10 | 41 | 126 | 211 | −85 | 28 | |

Source: KHL
Rules for classification: 1) points; 2) games won in regulation time; 3) games won in overtime; 4) games won in shootouts; 5) goal difference; 6) number of goals scored; 7) drawing of lots.
(X) Won division; (Z) Won Continental Cup

=== Eastern Conference ===
| Pos | Team | Pld | W | OTW | OTL | L | GF | GA | GD | Pts | Qualification |
|---|---|---|---|---|---|---|---|---|---|---|---|
| 1 | Ak Bars Kazan (Y) | 60 | 33 | 8 | 8 | 11 | 185 | 131 | +54 | 90 | Advance to Gagarin Cup Playoffs (Note: Teams leading a division hold one of the first two places of their conference.) |
| 2 | Avangard Omsk (X) | 60 | 33 | 3 | 12 | 12 | 180 | 134 | +46 | 84 | Advance to Gagarin Cup Playoffs |
| 3 | Metallurg Magnitogorsk | 60 | 31 | 6 | 7 | 16 | 165 | 138 | +27 | 81 | Advance to Gagarin Cup Playoffs |
| 4 | Salavat Yulaev Ufa | 60 | 28 | 10 | 5 | 17 | 181 | 151 | +30 | 81 | Advance to Gagarin Cup Playoffs |
| 5 | Traktor Chelyabinsk | 60 | 27 | 7 | 6 | 20 | 157 | 143 | +14 | 74 | Advance to Gagarin Cup Playoffs |
| 6 | Barys Nur-Sultan | 60 | 20 | 11 | 7 | 22 | 147 | 157 | −10 | 69 | Advance to Gagarin Cup Playoffs |
| 7 | Avtomobilist Yekaterinburg | 60 | 24 | 6 | 8 | 22 | 152 | 154 | −2 | 68 | Advance to Gagarin Cup Playoffs |
| 8 | Torpedo Nizhny Novgorod | 60 | 22 | 7 | 9 | 22 | 170 | 168 | +2 | 67 | Advance to Gagarin Cup Playoffs |
| 9 | Sibir Novosibirsk | 60 | 20 | 7 | 4 | 29 | 146 | 155 | −9 | 58 | |
| 10 | Amur Khabarovsk | 60 | 17 | 7 | 7 | 29 | 146 | 171 | −25 | 55 | |
| 11 | Neftekhimik Nizhnekamsk | 60 | 13 | 6 | 2 | 39 | 133 | 214 | −81 | 40 | |
| 12 | Kunlun Red Star | 60 | 11 | 2 | 8 | 39 | 139 | 213 | −74 | 34 | |

Source: KHL
Rules for classification: 1) points; 2) games won in regulation time; 3) games won in overtime; 4) games won in shootouts; 5) goal difference; 6) number of goals scored; 7) drawing of lots.
(X) Won division; (Y) Won conference

== Gagarin Cup playoffs ==
Ak Bars Kazan were the Eastern Conference regular season winners with 90 points. It was determined despite a 2–3 overtime loss at home to Spartak Moscow. CSKA Moscow were the Western Conference regular season winners with 91 points. It was determined following a 1–3 defeat suffered by closest challengers SKA Saint Petersburg, at home to Dynamo Moscow, leaving CSKA Moscow with an unassailable points lead. CSKA Moscow won the Continental Cup for the third season in succession and sixth time overall, defeating Ak Bars Kazan 1–0 on the final day of the regular season.

The 2021 Gagarin Cup playoffs started on 2 March 2021, and finished on 28 April 2021. The top eight teams from each of the conferences qualified for the playoffs.

Conference Quarterfinals | Conference Semifinals
1 | (Russia) Ak Bars | 4
8 | (Russia) Torpedo | 0
1 | (Russia) Ak Bars | 4
4 | (Russia) Salavat Yulaev | 0
2 | (Russia) Avangard | 4
7 | (Russia) Avtomobilist | 1
Eastern Conference
3 | (Russia) Metallurg | 4
6 | (Kazakhstan) Barys | 2
2 | (Russia) Avangard | 4
3 | (Russia) Metallurg | 2
4 | (Russia) Salavat Yulaev | 4
5 | (Russia) Traktor | 1
1 | (Russia) CSKA | 4
8 | (Russia) Spartak | 0
1 | (Russia) CSKA | 4
4 | (Russia) Lokomotiv | 3
2 | (Russia) SKA | 4
7 | (Belarus) Dinamo | 1
Western Conference
3 | (Russia) Dynamo | 4
6 | (Russia) Severstal | 1
2 | (Russia) SKA | 4
3 | (Russia) Dynamo | 1
4 | (Russia) Lokomotiv | 4
5 | (Finland) Jokerit | 0

Conference Finals
1 | (Russia) Ak Bars | 3
2 | (Russia) Avangard | 4
1 | (Russia) CSKA | 4
2 | (Russia) SKA | 2

Gagarin Cup Finals
E2 | (Russia) Avangard | 4
W1 | (Russia) CSKA | 2

== Statistics ==
=== Scoring leaders ===
The following players led the league in points, at the conclusion of the regular season. If two or more skaters are tied (i.e. same number of points, goals and played games), all of the tied skaters are shown.

| Player | Team | GP | G | A | Pts | +/– | PIM |
|---|---|---|---|---|---|---|---|
| (Russia) Vadim Shipachyov | Dynamo Moscow | 57 | 20 | 46 | 66 | +28 | 22 |
| (Finland) Teemu Hartikainen | Salavat Yulaev Ufa | 53 | 28 | 36 | 64 | +17 | 18 |
| (Russia) Damir Zhafyarov | Torpedo Nizhny Novgorod | 58 | 21 | 40 | 61 | +6 | 26 |
| (Czech Republic) Dmitrij Jaškin | Dynamo Moscow | 59 | 38 | 22 | 60 | +25 | 52 |
| (France) Stéphane Da Costa | Ak Bars Kazan | 52 | 27 | 30 | 57 | +12 | 24 |
| (Canada) Justin Danforth | Vityaz Podolsk | 58 | 23 | 32 | 55 | +3 | 50 |
| (United States) Brian O'Neill | Jokerit | 53 | 12 | 42 | 54 | +30 | 12 |
| (Finland) Markus Granlund | Salavat Yulaev Ufa | 50 | 23 | 30 | 53 | +22 | 26 |
| (Finland) Sakari Manninen | Salavat Yulaev Ufa | 55 | 19 | 33 | 52 | +18 | 10 |
| (United States) Shane Prince | Dinamo Minsk | 52 | 25 | 24 | 49 | +14 | 45 |

=== Leading goaltenders ===
The following goaltenders led the league in goals against average, at the conclusion of the regular season.

| Player | Team | GP | TOI | W | L | GA | SO | SV% | GAA |
|---|---|---|---|---|---|---|---|---|---|
| (Sweden) Lars Johansson | CSKA Moscow | 24 | 1394:56 | 19 | 3 | 37 | 4 | 93.24% | 1.59 |
| (Russia) Alexander Yeryomenko | Dynamo Moscow | 26 | 1371:21 | 16 | 6 | 40 | 4 | 93.58% | 1.75 |
| (Sweden) Adam Reideborn | Ak Bars Kazan | 29 | 1712:59 | 16 | 9 | 52 | 3 | 93.11% | 1.82 |
| (Sweden) Magnus Hellberg | SKA Saint Petersburg | 21 | 1171:57 | 14 | 4 | 37 | 2 | 93.05% | 1.89 |
| (Finland) Juho Olkinuora | Metallurg Magnitogorsk | 30 | 1702:18 | 17 | 7 | 54 | 2 | 93.49% | 1.90 |
| (Canada) Edward Pasquale | Lokomotiv Yaroslavl | 41 | 2393:26 | 25 | 11 | 76 | 5 | 92.46% | 1.91 |
| (Russia) Igor Bobkov | Avangard Omsk | 30 | 1669:18 | 18 | 7 | 56 | 1 | 92.79% | 2.01 |
| (Russia) Alexander Samonov | SKA Saint Petersburg | 22 | 1160:07 | 10 | 8 | 39 | 2 | 92.46% | 2.02 |
| (Russia) Alexander Sharychenkov | CSKA Moscow | 36 | 2020:42 | 18 | 10 | 70 | 2 | 91.53% | 2.08 |
| (Russia) Ivan Fedotov | Traktor Chelyabinsk | 26 | 1496:07 | 14 | 7 | 55 | 1 | 92.52% | 2.21 |

== Awards ==
=== Players of the Month ===
The following players were recognised as the best KHL players of each month.

| Month | Goaltender | Defence | Forward | Rookie |
|---|---|---|---|---|
| September | (Russia) Emil Garipov (Avangard Omsk) | (Canada) Chay Genoway (Avtomobilist Yekaterinburg) | (Russia) Alexei Makeyev (Avtomobilist Yekaterinburg) | (Russia) Egor Chinakhov (Avangard Omsk) |
| October | (Canada) Edward Pasquale (Lokomotiv Yaroslavl) | (Russia) Daniil Miromanov (HC Sochi) | (Canada) Justin Danforth (Vityaz Podolsk) | (Russia) Egor Chinakhov (Avangard Omsk) |
| November | (Czech Republic) Dominik Furch (Dinamo Minsk) | (Russia) Alexei Emelin (Avangard Omsk) | (Czech Republic) Dmitrij Jaškin (Dynamo Moscow) | (Russia) Ivan Chekhovich (Torpedo Nizhny Novgorod) |
| December | (Russia) Alexander Yeryomenko (Dynamo Moscow) | (Belarus) Stepan Falkovsky (Dinamo Minsk) | (France) Stéphane Da Costa (Ak Bars Kazan) | (Russia) Ivan Chekhovich (Torpedo Nizhny Novgorod) |
| January | (Canada) Edward Pasquale (Lokomotiv Yaroslavl) | (Sweden) Philip Holm (Metallurg Magnitogorsk) | (United States) Shane Prince (Dinamo Minsk) | (Russia) Alexander Alexeyev (Salavat Yulaev Ufa) |
| February | (Sweden) Lars Johansson (CSKA Moscow) | (Belarus) Nick Bailen (Traktor Chelyabinsk) | (Czech Republic) Dmitrij Jaškin (Dynamo Moscow) | (Russia) Klim Kostin (Avangard Omsk) |
