= 2018–19 KHL season =

Russia-based professional ice hockey league season

- League: Kontinental Hockey League
- Sport: Ice hockey
- Duration: 1 September 2018 – 19 April 2019
- Teams: 25

Regular season
- Continental Cup winner: CSKA Moscow
- Top scorer: Nikita Gusev (SKA Saint Petersburg); (82 points)

Playoffs
- Western champions: CSKA Moscow
- Western runners-up: SKA Saint Petersburg
- Eastern champions: Avangard Omsk
- Eastern runners-up: Salavat Yulaev Ufa
- Playoffs MVP: Ilya Sorokin (CSKA Moscow)

Gagarin Cup Finals
- Champions: CSKA Moscow
- Runners-up: Avangard Omsk
- Finals MVP: Ilya Sorokin (CSKA Moscow)

KHL seasons
- ← 2017–18 2019–20 →

The 2018–19 KHL season was the 11th season of the Kontinental Hockey League. The season started on 1 September 2018 and ended on 19 April 2019. Continental Cup winners CSKA Moscow became the first team to win the Gagarin Cup finals in a series sweep, defeating Avangard Omsk in four games to win their first Gagarin Cup, after two previous Finals defeats.

== Season changes ==
For the 2018–19 season, 25 teams competed in the KHL – down from 27 in 2017–18. The two teams that were excluded from the league were HC Lada Togliatti and HC Yugra, with both teams moving to the Supreme Hockey League. As well as this, Torpedo Nizhny Novgorod were moved from the Western Conference, to the Eastern Conference; as a result, the Western Conference consisted of 12 teams and the Eastern Conference consisted of 13 teams.

The 2018–19 season featured the most games of any KHL season to date, with each team scheduled to play 62 games, up from 56 in 2017–18.

=== KHL World Games ===
This season witnessed the first time that KHL games were played in Austria and Switzerland, as part of the KHL World Games. Slovan Bratislava played in both Austrian games (on 26 and 28 October) at the Albert Schultz Eishalle in Vienna – home to the Vienna Capitals of the Austrian Hockey League – losing 9–0 to CSKA Moscow, and 7–0 to SKA Saint Petersburg. The Swiss games were played at the Hallenstadion in Zürich – home to the ZSC Lions of the Swiss National League – with Dinamo Riga playing in both games (on 26 and 28 November), losing 3–1 to SKA Saint Petersburg, and 5–0 to CSKA Moscow.

== Teams ==
The 25 teams were split into four divisions: the Bobrov Division and the Tarasov Division as part of the Western Conference, with the Kharlamov Division and the Chernyshev Division as part of the Eastern Conference. On 24 April 2018, the KHL announced re-alignment after both Lada Togliatti and Yugra Khanty-Mansiysk left the league.

Western Conference	Eastern Conference

Bobrov Division	Tarasov Division	Kharlamov Division	Chernyshev Division
(Latvia) Dinamo Riga	(Russia) CSKA Moscow	(Russia) Admiral Vladivostok	(Russia) Ak Bars Kazan
(Russia) Dynamo Moscow	(Belarus) Dinamo Minsk	(Russia) Amur Khabarovsk	(Russia) Avtomobilist Yekaterinburg
(Finland) Jokerit	(Russia) HC Sochi	(Russia) Avangard Omsk	(Russia) Metallurg Magnitogorsk
(Russia) Severstal Cherepovets	(Russia) Lokomotiv Yaroslavl	(Kazakhstan) Barys Astana	(Russia) Neftekhimik Nizhnekamsk
(Russia) SKA Saint Petersburg	(Slovakia) Slovan Bratislava	(China) Kunlun Red Star	(Russia) Torpedo Nizhny Novgorod
(Russia) Spartak Moscow	(Russia) Vityaz Podolsk	(Russia) Salavat Yulaev Ufa	(Russia) Traktor Chelyabinsk
		(Russia) Sibir Novosibirsk	

== League standings ==
Each team played 62 games, playing each of the other twenty-four teams twice: once on home ice, and once away from home. As well as this, each team played a further two games against each of their divisional rivals, and four games total against non-divisional teams.

Points were awarded for each game, where two points were awarded for all victories, regardless of whether it was in regulation time, in overtime or after a shootout. One point was awarded for losing in overtime or a shootout, and zero points for losing in regulation time. At the end of the regular season, the team that finished with the most points was crowned the Continental Cup winner.

=== Western Conference ===
Pos	Team	Pld	W	OTW	OTL	L	GF	GA	GD	Pts	Qualification
1	CSKA Moscow	62	43	10	0	9	191	75	+116	106	Advance to Gagarin Cup Playoffs (Note: Teams leading a division hold one of the first two places of their conference.)
2	SKA Saint Petersburg	62	45	4	5	8	209	80	+129	103	Advance to Gagarin Cup Playoffs
3	Lokomotiv Yaroslavl	62	34	6	6	16	159	118	+41	86	Advance to Gagarin Cup Playoffs
4	Jokerit	62	32	5	6	19	197	164	+33	80	Advance to Gagarin Cup Playoffs
5	Dynamo Moscow	62	27	6	6	23	153	139	+14	72	Advance to Gagarin Cup Playoffs
6	HC Sochi	62	19	9	10	24	145	155	−10	66	Advance to Gagarin Cup Playoffs
7	Spartak Moscow	62	21	7	8	26	156	158	−2	64	Advance to Gagarin Cup Playoffs
8	Vityaz Podolsk	62	23	5	7	27	134	169	−35	63	Advance to Gagarin Cup Playoffs
9	Dinamo Riga	62	18	8	10	26	129	155	−26	62	
10	Severstal Cherepovets	62	14	9	5	34	124	178	−54	51	
11	Dinamo Minsk	62	15	2	8	37	119	180	−61	42	
12	Slovan Bratislava	62	10	5	3	44	101	213	−112	33	

Source: KHL
Rules for classification: 1) points; 2) games won in regulation time; 3) games won in overtime and shootouts; 4) goal difference; 5) number of goals scored; 6) drawing of lots.

=== Eastern Conference ===
Pos	Team	Pld	W	OTW	OTL	L	GF	GA	GD	Pts	Qualification
1	Avtomobilist Yekaterinburg	62	39	8	1	14	191	125	+66	95	Advance to Gagarin Cup Playoffs (Note: Teams leading a division hold one of the first two places of their conference.)
2	Barys Astana	62	28	10	10	14	190	149	+41	86	Advance to Gagarin Cup Playoffs
3	Metallurg Magnitogorsk	62	35	6	2	19	182	132	+50	84	Advance to Gagarin Cup Playoffs
4	Avangard Omsk	62	29	10	5	18	177	133	+44	83	Advance to Gagarin Cup Playoffs
5	Ak Bars Kazan	62	34	4	6	18	165	139	+26	82	Advance to Gagarin Cup Playoffs
6	Salavat Yulaev Ufa	62	24	7	10	21	158	140	+18	72	Advance to Gagarin Cup Playoffs
7	Torpedo Nizhny Novgorod	62	20	7	10	25	176	193	−17	64	Advance to Gagarin Cup Playoffs
8	Traktor Chelyabinsk	62	18	9	4	31	102	151	−49	58	Advance to Gagarin Cup Playoffs
9	Sibir Novosibirsk	62	19	5	6	32	148	192	−44	54	
10	Neftekhimik Nizhnekamsk	62	15	8	6	33	130	164	−34	52	
11	Kunlun Red Star	62	19	1	11	31	142	190	−48	51	
12	Admiral Vladivostok	62	18	5	5	34	139	176	−37	51	
13	Amur Khabarovsk	62	17	3	9	33	126	175	−49	49	

Source: KHL
Rules for classification: 1) points; 2) games won in regulation time; 3) games won in overtime and shootouts; 4) goal difference; 5) number of goals scored; 6) drawing of lots.

== Gagarin Cup playoffs ==
Conference Quarterfinals	Conference Semifinals
1	(Russia) Avtomobilist	4
8	(Russia) Traktor	0
1	(Russia) Avtomobilist	1
6	(Russia) Salavat Yulaev	4
2	(Kazakhstan) Barys	4
7	(Russia) Torpedo	3
Eastern Conference
3	(Russia) Metallurg	2
6	(Russia) Salavat Yulaev	4
2	(Kazakhstan) Barys	1
4	(Russia) Avangard	4
4	(Russia) Avangard	4
5	(Russia) Ak Bars	0
1	(Russia) CSKA	4
8	(Russia) Vityaz	0
1	(Russia) CSKA	4
5	(Russia) Dynamo	1
2	(Russia) SKA	4
7	(Russia) Spartak	2
Western Conference
3	(Russia) Lokomotiv	4
6	(Russia) Sochi	2
2	(Russia) SKA	4
3	(Russia) Lokomotiv	1
4	(Finland) Jokerit	2
5	(Russia) Dynamo	4

Conference Finals
6	(Russia) Salavat Yulaev	2
4	(Russia) Avangard	4
1	(Russia) CSKA	4
2	(Russia) SKA	3

Gagarin Cup Finals
E4	(Russia) Avangard	0
W1	(Russia) CSKA	4

== Final standings ==
Rank	Team
1	(Russia) CSKA Moscow
2	(Russia) Avangard Omsk
3	(Russia) SKA Saint Petersburg
4	(Russia) Salavat Yulaev Ufa
5	(Russia) Avtomobilist Yekaterinburg
6	(Russia) Lokomotiv Yaroslavl
7	(Kazakhstan) Barys Astana
8	(Russia) Dynamo Moscow
9	(Russia) Metallurg Magnitogorsk
10	(Russia) Ak Bars Kazan
11	(Finland) Jokerit
12	(Russia) HC Sochi
13	(Russia) Spartak Moscow
14	(Russia) Torpedo Nizhny Novgorod
15	(Russia) Vityaz Podolsk
16	(Russia) Traktor Chelyabinsk
17	(Latvia) Dinamo Riga
18	(Russia) Sibir Novosibirsk
19	(Russia) Neftekhimik Nizhnekamsk
20	(China) Kunlun Red Star
21	(Russia) Admiral Vladivostok
22	(Russia) Severstal Cherepovets
23	(Russia) Amur Khabarovsk
24	(Belarus) Dinamo Minsk
25	(Slovakia) Slovan Bratislava

== Player statistics ==
=== Scoring leaders ===
The following players led the league in points, at the conclusion of the regular season. If two or more skaters are tied (i.e. same number of points, goals and played games), all of the tied skaters are shown.

Player	Team	GP	G	A	Pts	+/–	PIM
(Russia) Nikita Gusev	SKA Saint Petersburg	62	17	65	82	+39	10
(Kazakhstan) Nigel Dawes	Avtomobilist Yekaterinburg	60	28	41	69	+20	12
(Russia) Vadim Shipachyov	Dynamo Moscow	61	20	48	68	+22	30
(Russia) Dmitri Kagarlitsky	Dynamo Moscow	61	24	37	61	+22	40
(United States) Brian O'Neill	Jokerit	62	13	45	58	+7	30
(Russia) Sergei Mozyakin	Metallurg Magnitogorsk	61	23	32	55	+14	10
(Canada) Matt Ellison	Metallurg Magnitogorsk	62	20	35	55	+12	34
(United States) Dan Sexton	Avtomobilist Yekaterinburg	61	25	28	53	+22	6
(Canada) Darren Dietz	Barys Astana	62	15	38	53	+30	59
(Russia) Mikhail Grigorenko	CSKA Moscow	55	17	35	52	+33	10

=== Leading goaltenders ===
The following goaltenders led the league in goals against average, at the conclusion of the regular season.

Player	Team	GP	TOI	W	L	GA	SO	SV%	GAA
(Russia) Igor Shesterkin	SKA Saint Petersburg	28	1680:51	24	4	31	10	95.27%	1.11
(Sweden) Lars Johansson	CSKA Moscow	24	1406:51	20	3	27	9	94.50%	1.15
(Russia) Ilya Sorokin	CSKA Moscow	40	2327:53	28	6	45	11	94.04%	1.16
(Sweden) Magnus Hellberg	SKA Saint Petersburg	34	2048:13	24	7	45	8	93.98%	1.32
(Czech Republic) Jakub Kovář	Avtomobilist Yekaterinburg	50	2958:08	38	9	88	8	93.90%	1.78
(Russia) Ilya Konovalov	Lokomotiv Yaroslavl	45	2416:58	25	15	76	10	92.96%	1.89
(Russia) Ivan Bocharov	Dynamo Moscow	38	2113:41	19	16	68	3	93.27%	1.93
(Russia) Artyom Zagidulin	Metallurg Magnitogorsk	25	1102:49	12	7	36	4	92.44%	1.96
(Russia) Igor Bobkov	Avangard Omsk	49	2682:16	25	17	89	8	91.44%	1.99
(Finland) Juha Metsola	Salavat Yulaev Ufa	48	2761:22	25	20	93	4	93.44%	2.02

== Awards ==
=== Season awards ===
The KHL's end-of-season awards ceremony was held on 28 May 2019 in Barvikha.

Award	Recipient(s)	Team
Best Sniper Award (most goals)	(Russia) Kirill Kaprizov	(Russia) CSKA Moscow
Coach of the Year	(Russia) Igor Nikitin	(Russia) CSKA Moscow
General Manager of the Year	(Russia) Igor Yesmantovich	(Russia) CSKA Moscow
Gimayev Prize (for loyalty to hockey)	(Russia) Alexander Popov	(Russia) CSKA Moscow
Golden Helmet	(Finland) Juha Metsola	(Russia) Salavat Yulaev Ufa
Golden Helmet	(Kazakhstan) Darren Dietz	(Kazakhstan) Barys Astana
Golden Helmet	(Russia) Nikita Nesterov	(Russia) CSKA Moscow
Golden Helmet	(Russia) Mikhail Grigorenko	(Russia) CSKA Moscow
Golden Helmet	(Finland) Teemu Hartikainen	(Russia) Salavat Yulaev Ufa
Golden Helmet	(Russia) Ilya Mikheyev	(Russia) Avangard Omsk
Playoffs Most Valuable Player	(Russia) Ilya Sorokin	(Russia) CSKA Moscow
Rookie of the Year	(Russia) Ilya Konovalov	(Russia) Lokomotiv Yaroslavl
Top Scorer Award (most points)	(Russia) Nikita Gusev	(Russia) SKA Saint Petersburg
Continental Cup	(Russia) CSKA Moscow	
Eastern Conference winner	(Russia) Avangard Omsk	
Vsevolod Bobrov Prize (most team goals)	(Russia) SKA Saint Petersburg	
Western Conference winner	(Russia) CSKA Moscow	

=== Players of the Month ===
Best KHL players of each month.

Month	Goaltender	Defence	Forward	Rookie
September	(Czech Republic) Jakub Kovář (Avtomobilist Yekaterinburg)	(Canada) Darren Dietz (Barys Astana)	(Russia) Anatoly Golyshev (Avtomobilist Yekaterinburg)	(Russia) Nikita Mikhailov (Sibir Novosibirsk)
October	(Finland) Juha Metsola (Salavat Yulaev Ufa)	(Canada) Paul Postma (Ak Bars Kazan)	(Kazakhstan) Nigel Dawes (Avtomobilist Yekaterinburg)	(Russia) Ilya Konovalov (Lokomotiv Yaroslavl)
November	(Russia) Ilya Sorokin (CSKA Moscow)	(Canada) Darren Dietz (Barys Astana)	(Kazakhstan) Nigel Dawes (Avtomobilist Yekaterinburg)	(Russia) Nikita Mikhailov (Sibir Novosibirsk)
December	(Kazakhstan) Henrik Karlsson (Barys Astana)	(Czech Republic) Vojtěch Mozík (Vityaz)	(Russia) Vadim Shipachyov (Dynamo Moscow)	(Finland) Kristian Vesalainen (Jokerit)
January	(Russia) Ilya Konovalov (Lokomotiv Yaroslavl)	(Sweden) Viktor Svedberg (Barys Astana)	(Russia) Nikita Gusev (SKA Saint Petersburg)	(Latvia) Mārtiņš Dzierkals (Dinamo Riga)
February	(Russia) Anton Krasotkin (Admiral Vladivostok)	(Sweden) Staffan Kronwall (Lokomotiv Yaroslavl)	(Sweden) André Petersson (Barys Astana)	(Russia) Ilya Konovalov (Lokomotiv Yaroslavl)
March	(Russia) Ilya Sorokin (CSKA Moscow)	(Canada) Mat Robinson (CSKA Moscow)	(Russia) Nikita Gusev (SKA Saint Petersburg)	(Russia) Daniil Misyul (Lokomotiv Yaroslavl)
April	(Finland) Juha Metsola (Salavat Yulaev Ufa)	(Canada) Mat Robinson (CSKA Moscow)	(Russia) Mikhail Grigorenko (CSKA Moscow)	Not awarded

== Attendances ==
The KHL clubs by average home league attendance in the 2018–19 season:

#	Club	Average
1	SKA	13,016
2	Minsk	9,495
3	Jokerit	8,768
4	CSKA	8,501
5	Spartak	8,341
6	Yaroslavl	7,876
7	Ak Bars	7,119
8	Traktor	7,026
9	Magnitogorsk	6,964
10	Riga	6,669
11	Slovan	6,450
12	Barys	6,448
13	Salavat Yulaev	6,176
14	Amur	6,031
15	Sibir	5,985
16	Dynamo Moscow	5,869
17	Sochi	5,711
18	Avtomobilist	5,427
19	Torpedo	5,292
20	Avangard	4,745
21	Severstal	3,674
22	Neftekhimik	3,675
23	Admiral	4,211
24	Vityaz	3,891
25	Kunlun	2,569
