= Damir Zhafyarov =

Russian ice hockey player

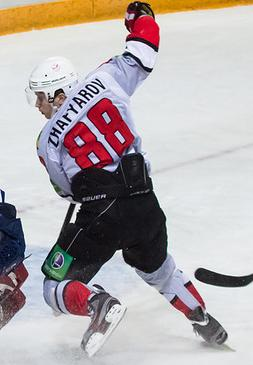
- Born: 17 March 1994 (age 32) Moscow, Russia
- Height: 5 ft 9 in (175 cm)
- Weight: 168 lb (76 kg; 12 st 0 lb)
- Position: Forward
- Shoots: Left
- KHL team Former teams: Neftekhimik Nizhnekamsk; Metallurg Novokuznetsk; CSKA Moscow; Sibir Novosibirsk; Admiral Vladivostok; Torpedo Nizhny Novgorod; SKA Saint Petersburg; Ak Bars Kazan; Avangard Omsk; Barys Astana
- NHL draft: Undrafted
- Playing career: 2012–present

Damir Ravilevich Zhafyarov (Russian: Дамир Равилевич Жафяров; born 17 March 1994) is a Russian professional ice hockey player for Neftekhimik Nizhnekamsk of the Kontinental Hockey League (KHL).

== Playing career ==
Undrafted, Zhafyarov made his Kontinental Hockey League (KHL) debut playing with Metallurg Novokuznetsk during the 2012–13 KHL season.

Following parts of two seasons with Admiral Vladivostok, Zhafyarov left as a free agent in signing a one-year contract with Torpedo Nizhny Novgorod on May 25, 2018.

Zharyarov developed into an integral part of the offense, during his four season tenure with Torpedo, and produced 173 points through 219 games. As a free agent following the 2021–22 season, Zhafyarov left the club to sign a lucrative two-year contract with SKA Saint Petersburg on 27 May 2022.

Zhafyarov played the 2022–23 season with SKA Saint Petersburg before he was traded in the off-season to Ak Bars Kazan in exchange for the rights to Filip Gustavsson and Dmriti Osipov on 1 June 2023.

After a lone season with Barys Astana in 2024–25 season, Zhafyarov left the club as a free agent and was signed to a one-year deal with Neftekhimik Nizhnekamsk on 25 June 2025.

== Career statistics ==
=== Regular season and playoffs ===
			Regular season					Playoffs
Season	Team	League	GP	G	A	Pts	PIM	GP	G	A	Pts	PIM
2011–12	Kuznetskie Medvedi	MHL	46	18	16	34	37	3	1	0	1	0
2012–13	Kuznetskie Medvedi	MHL	9	2	4	6	0	3	0	0	0	4
2012–13	Metallurg Novokuznetsk	KHL	41	5	6	11	6	—	—	—	—	—
2013–14	Metallurg Novokuznetsk	KHL	38	9	6	15	10	—	—	—	—	—
2013–14	Kuznetskie Medvedi	MHL	3	1	0	1	8	4	1	2	3	0
2014–15	CSKA Moscow	KHL	49	7	2	9	31	8	2	2	4	0
2014–15	Krasnaya Armiya	MHL	2	2	0	2	0	5	2	1	3	4
2015–16	Sibir Novosibirsk	KHL	56	6	7	13	12	10	1	0	1	0
2016–17	Sibir Novosibirsk	KHL	21	2	2	4	4	—	—	—	—	—
2016–17	Admiral Vladivostok	KHL	16	1	3	4	8	6	0	2	2	0
2017–18	Admiral Vladivostok	KHL	35	8	7	15	4	—	—	—	—	—
2018–19	Torpedo Nizhny Novgorod	KHL	59	13	17	30	20	7	1	3	4	6
2019–20	Torpedo Nizhny Novgorod	KHL	55	17	20	37	12	4	0	2	2	0
2020–21	Torpedo Nizhny Novgorod	KHL	58	21	40	61	26	4	0	1	1	2
2021–22	Torpedo Nizhny Novgorod	KHL	47	18	27	45	12	—	—	—	—	—
2022–23	SKA Saint Petersburg	KHL	63	16	28	44	20	12	1	8	9	11
2023–24	Ak Bars Kazan	KHL	16	1	1	2	6	—	—	—	—	—
2023–24	Avangard Omsk	KHL	25	4	11	15	6	12	0	4	4	2
2024–25	Barys Astana	KHL	27	1	4	5	10	—	—	—	—	—
2025–26	Neftekhimik Nizhnekamsk	KHL	55	12	22	34	14	5	0	3	3	0
KHL totals			661	141	203	344	201	68	5	25	30	21

Medal record

Representing Russia

Ice hockey

World Junior Championships
Bronze medal – third place	2014 Sweden	

=== International ===
Year	Team	Event	Result	GP	G	A	Pts	PIM
2014	Russia	WJC	3rd place, bronze medalist(s)	7	3	3	6	0
Junior totals				7	3	3	6	0
