= Sergei Gribanov =

Russian ice hockey player

- Born: 2 January 1986 (age 39); Lipetsk, Russian SFSR, Soviet Union
- Height: 5 ft 11 in (180 cm)
- Weight: 161 lb (73 kg; 11 st 7 lb)
- Position: Forward
- Shot: Left
- Played for: SKA Saint Petersburg; HC MVD; Vityaz Chekov; Metallurg Novokuznetsk
- Playing career: 2004–2017

Sergei Gribanov (born 2 January 1986) is a Russian former professional ice hockey forward.

Gribanov played in the Russian Superleague for SKA Saint Petersburg, HC MVD and Vityaz Chekov, as well as its successor Kontinental Hockey League for Metallurg Novokuznetsk.
