= Ivan Savin =

Russian ice hockey player

- Born: January 4, 1981 (age 45) Chelyabinsk, Russian SFSR
- Height: 6 ft 0 in (183 cm)
- Weight: 190 lb (86 kg; 13 st 8 lb)
- Position: Defence
- Shot: Right
- Played for: Mechel Chelyabinsk; Traktor Chelyabinsk; HC MVD; Metallurg Magnitogorsk; Spartak Moscow; Neftekhimik Nizhnekamsk; Avtomobilist Yekaterinburg
- Playing career: 1997–2013

Ivan Anatolyevich Savin (Russian: Иван Анатольевич Савин) is a Russian former professional ice hockey defenceman who predominantly played in his hometown with Mechel Chelyabinsk and Traktor Chelyabinsk of the Kontinental Hockey League (KHL). In January 2020, Savin became the general manager for Traktor Chelyabinsk.
