= HC Lev Praha =

Ice hockey team

- Nickname: Lions, Pride
- City: Prague, Czech Republic
- League: Kontinental Hockey League
- Conference: Western
- Division: Bobrov
- Founded: 2012
- Folded: 2014
- Home arena: Tipsport Arena (capacity: 13,150); O_{2} Arena (capacity: 17,360)
- Colours
- Owner: Sportovní holding Praha
- President: Evgeni Myshkovskyi
- General manager: Rashid Khabibulin
- Affiliates: Sparta Praha (Czech Extraliga), HC Stadion Litoměřice (Czech 1. Liga)
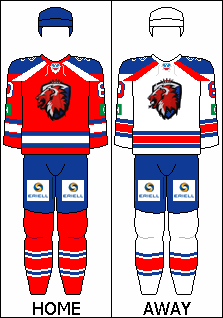

Franchise history
- Hockey Club Lev Praha

Hockey Club Lev Praha (stylized as HC LEV Praha) was a professional ice hockey team located in Prague, Czech Republic, which played in the Kontinental Hockey League (KHL) in the 2012–13 and 2013–14 seasons.

In their two seasons played, Lev made the Gagarin Cup playoffs both times. In 2012–13, they finished 7th in the Western Conference and were swept in four straight games by HC CSKA Moscow in the first round. In 2013–14, they finished 3rd in the West, then they swept KHL Medveščak Zagreb in four, outlasted HC Donbass in six and beat Lokomotiv Yaroslavl in five to become Western Conference Champions. In the Gagarin Cup Finals, they faced Eastern Conference Champions Metallurg Magnitogorsk. The series went to a seventh and decisive game before Metallurg prevailed and won the Gagarin Cup on home ice 7–4.

Lev's home attendance in the 2012–13 regular season averaged 7,161 spectators per game, making it the highest-attended Prague hockey club and the sixth highest in the KHL. Lev holds the record for the five largest indoor home crowds in KHL history, with a record of 17,073 attending Game 4 of the Gagarin Cup Finals at O2 Arena on April 24, 2014. However, after two seasons, because of financial problems caused by the withdrawing of two major sponsors, Lev did not play in the 2014–15 KHL season. According to shareholders, this decision did not rule out the possibility of the KHL returning to Prague in the future. However, the team never returned to the ice.

== History ==
=== HC Lev in Hradec Králové and Poprad ===
A team named HC Lev Hradec Králové was founded in 2010 and based in Hradec Králové, Bohemia, Czech Republic, with the intention to join the KHL for the 2010–11 season. However, the Czech Ice Hockey Association refused to give permission to the club. Therefore, the team was moved to Poprad, Slovakia and was finally able to join the KHL for the 2011–12 season. But after only one KHL season, the team was disbanded.

=== New team in Prague (2012) ===
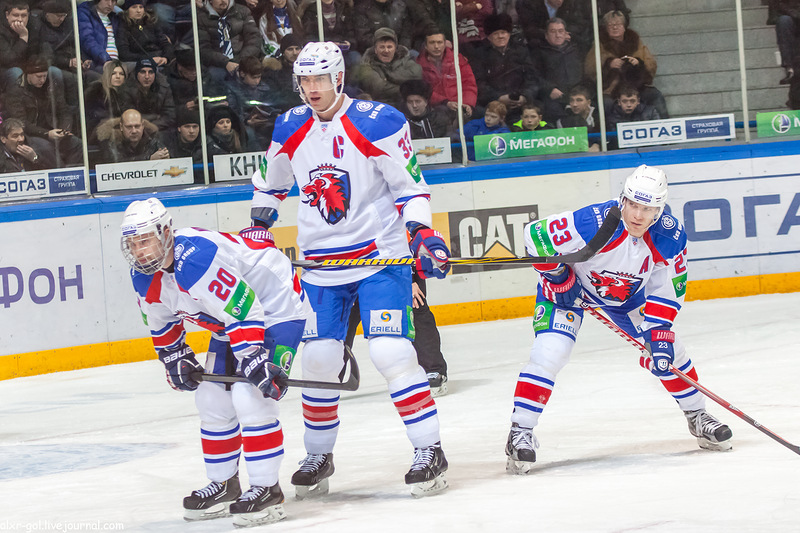
HC Lev Praha players in KHL

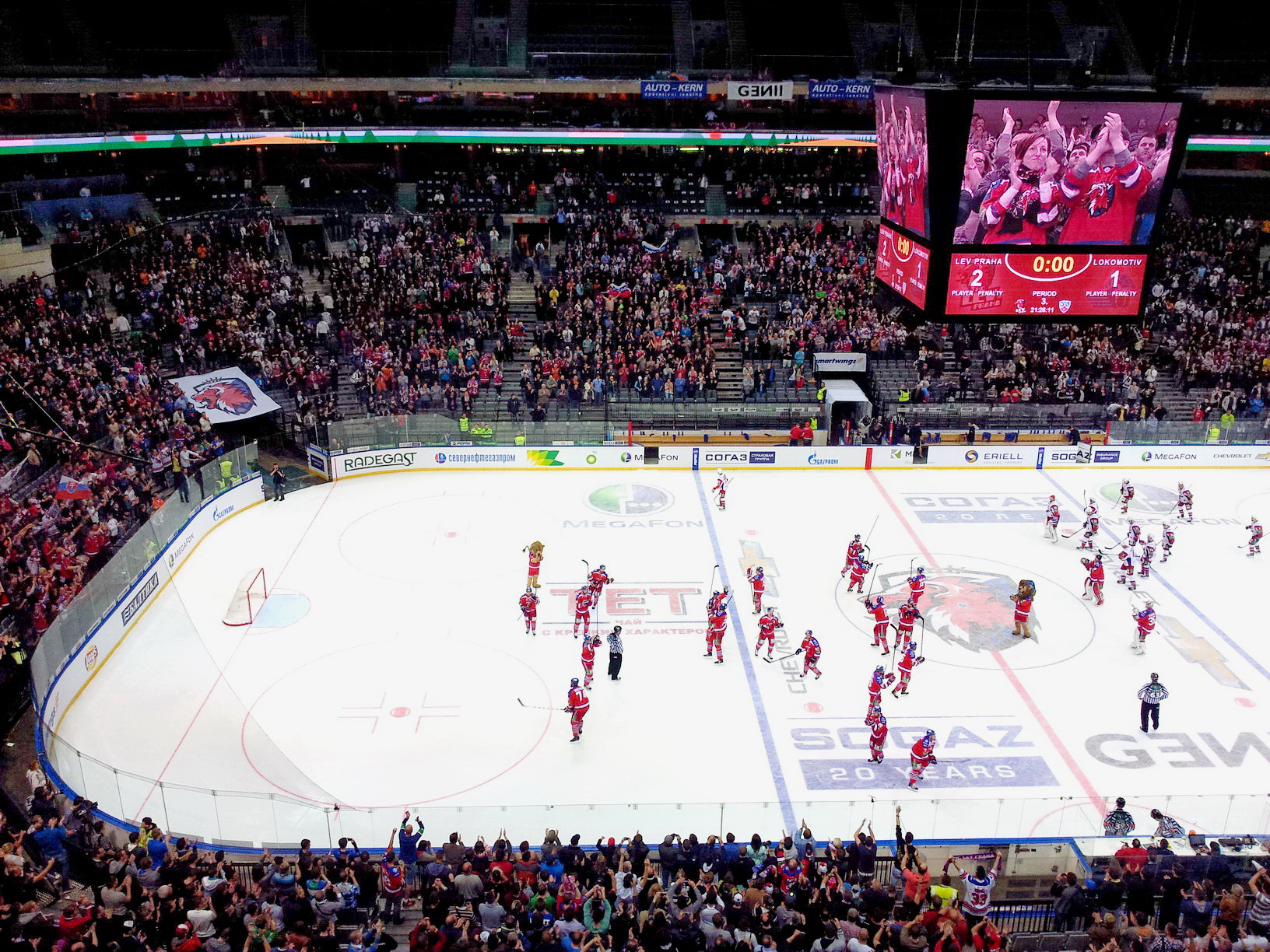
KHL match Lev vs. Lokomotiv

Late in Lev Poprad's 2011–12 season, a change of owners renewed speculation about a move to Prague, Czech Republic. In March 2012, the Czech Ice Hockey Association (ČSLH) granted permission for a KHL team to play in the Czech Republic, and at the end of April, a newly found team with the same name, HC Lev, but as a different organization, officially applied to the KHL to play in Prague.

Lev Praha had a working agreement with local Extraliga club HC Sparta Praha and the two teams shared Tipsport Arena. During their two seasons, Lev also played a total of 11 home games at the larger and newer O2 Arena.

=== Seasons ===
Lev signed Czech Josef Jandač as their head coach for the first KHL season, who named Jiří Novotný as the first team captain. They started the season on 6 September 2012 at home with a 2–1 win against Dinamo Riga. Lev started strong, and by winning six of their first seven games, they were even leading the Western conference for a while. After the NHL lockout came into effect in September, they signed Jakub Voráček, Jiří Hudler and Zdeno Chára for the duration of the lockout. Jandač was removed as head coach on 27 October and replaced shortly afterward by Václav Sýkora.

=== Achievements ===
(silver) Gagarin Cup (1): 2013–14

(gold) KHL Western Conference (1): 2013–14

(gold) Prague Hockey Cup (1): 2013

== Season-by-season record ==
Note: GP = Games played, W = Wins, L = Losses, OTW = Overtime/shootout wins, OTL = Overtime/shootout losses, Pts = Points, GF = Goals for, GA = Goals against

Season	GP	W	OTW	OTL	L	Pts	GF	GA	Finish	Playoffs
2012–13	52	23	1	5	23	76	132	133	4th, Bobrov	Lost in Conference Quarterfinals, 0–4 (CSKA Moscow)
2013–14	54	23	12	6	13	99	149	107	2nd, Bobrov	Lost in Gagarin Cup Finals, 3–4 (Metallurg Magnitogorsk)

== Players ==
=== Team captains ===
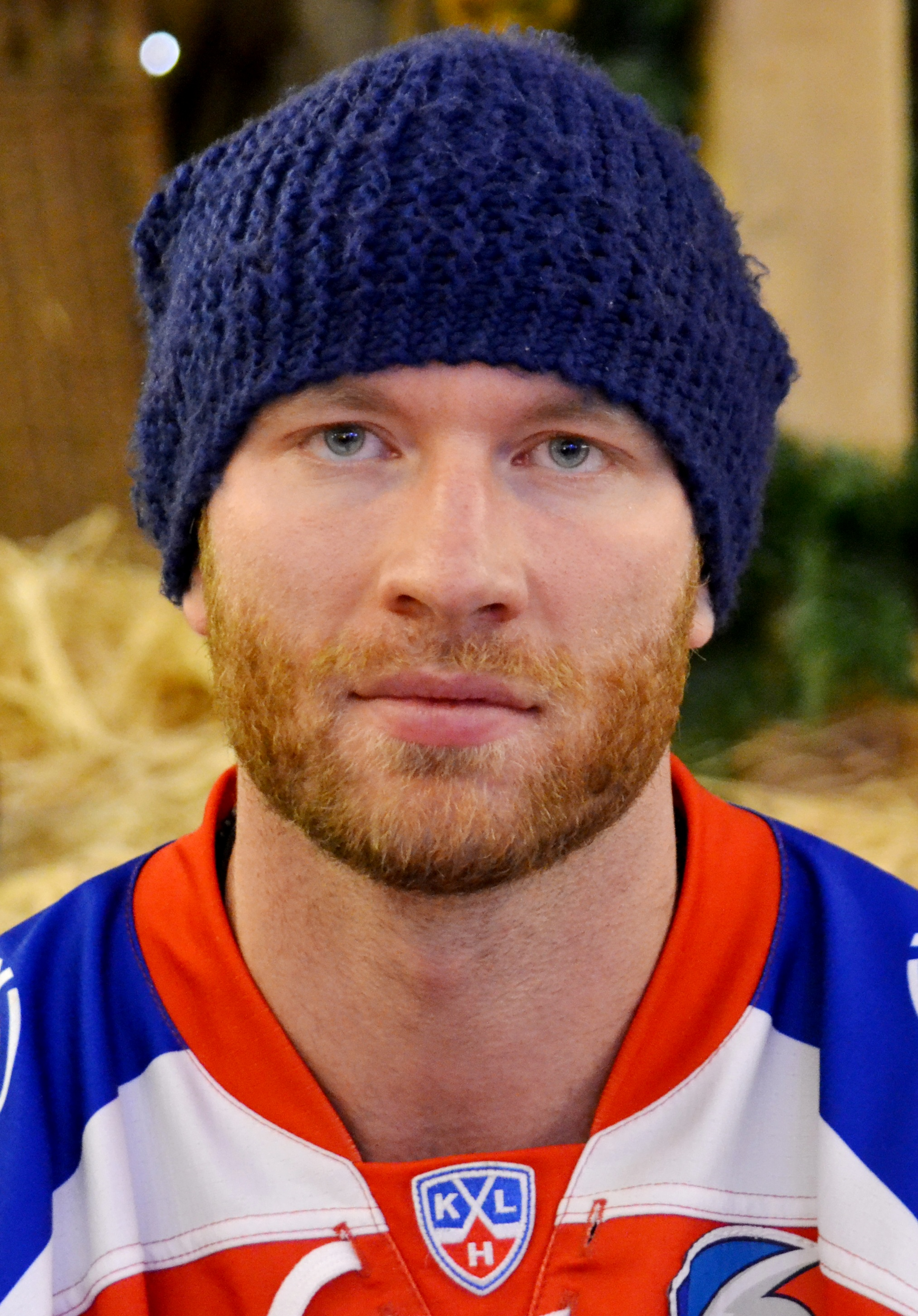
Jiří Novotný, captain from 2012 to 2014

Note: This list does not include captains from the HC Lev Poprad.

- Jiří Novotný, 2012–2014

=== Head coaches ===
Note: This list does not include head coaches from the HC Lev Poprad.

- Josef Jandač, 2012
- Václav Sýkora, 2012–13
- Kari Jalonen, 2013–14
