= Romazan Ice Sports Palace =

Indoor sporting arena in Magnitogorsk, Russia

Coordinates: 53°23′09″N 58°59′32″E

Romazan Ice Sports Palace is an indoor sporting arena located in Magnitogorsk, Russia. The capacity of the arena is 3,700 and was built in 1992. It was the home arena of the Metallurg Magnitogorsk ice hockey team from its opening until it was replaced by Magnitogorsk Arena in late 2006.

Evgeni Malkin played his youth ice hockey at the arena.
