= Arena Metallurg =

Indoor arena in Magnitogorsk, Russia

Coordinates: 53°22′54″N 58°59′35″E

- Арена Металлург
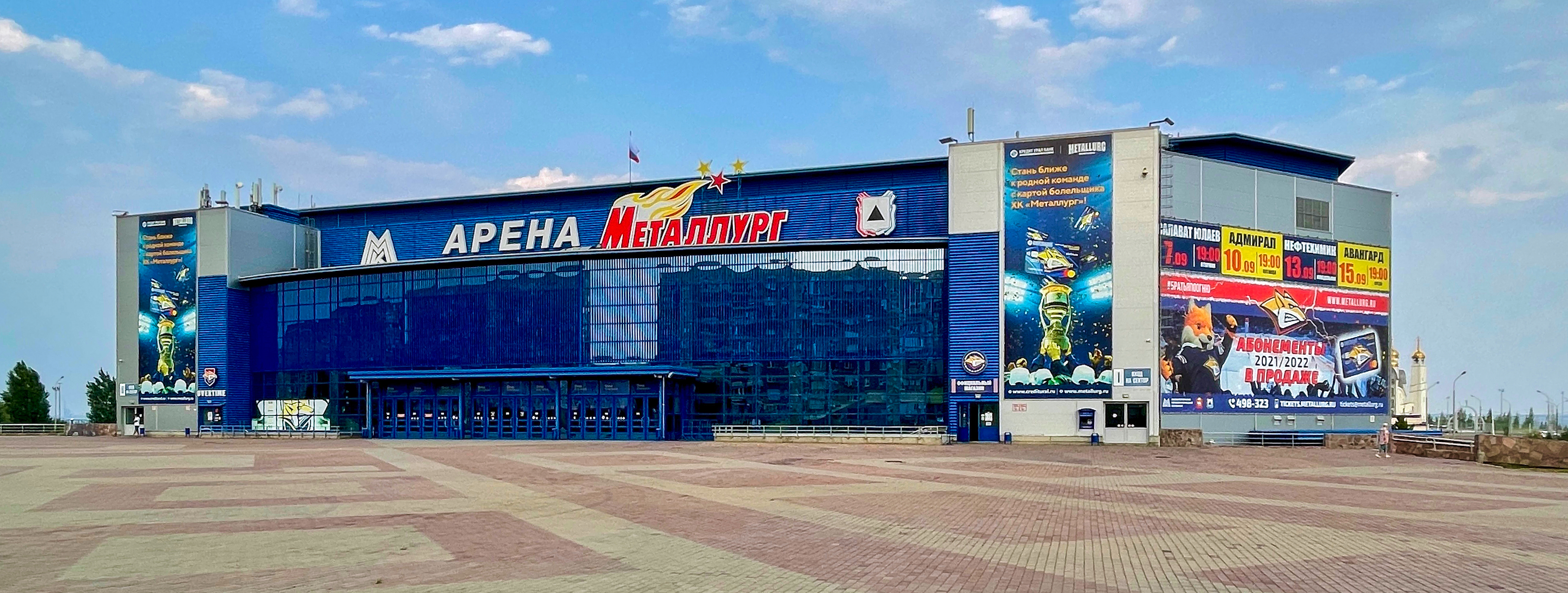
- Interactive map of Arena Metallurg
- Location: Magnitogorsk, Russia
- Capacity: 7,704

Construction
- Built: 2006
- Opened: 12 January 2007

Tenants
- Metallurg Magnitogorsk (KHL) (2007–present); Steel Foxes (MHL) (2009–present)

Arena Metallurg (Russian: Арена Металлург) is an indoor sporting arena located in Magnitogorsk, Russia. The capacity of the arena is 7,500 and was built in 2006. It is the home arena of the Metallurg Magnitogorsk ice hockey team. It replaced Romazan Ice Sports Palace in late 2006.

== On the inside ==
Information
Building size, 24 000 m2
Building year, 2005–2006

== See also ==
- List of indoor arenas in Russia
- List of Kontinental Hockey League arenas
