= HC MVD =

- Nickname: "Militiamen"
- City: Balashikha, Moscow Oblast, Russia
- League: KHL 2008–2010: RSL 2005–2008; Supreme League 1996–2005; IHL 1992–1996; CIS Champ. 1991–1992; USSR Champ. 1949–1991
- Conference: Western
- Division: Tarasov Division
- Founded: 1949; 77 years ago
- Folded: 2010; 16 years ago
- Home arena: Balashikha Arena (capacity: 6000)
- Colours
- Owner(s): (Russia) MVD
- Website: www.hcmvd.dynamo.ru

Franchise history
- HK MVD: THK Tver 1999–2004; SKA MVO 1961–1999; SKA Kalinin 1952–1961; Spartak Kalinin 1949–1952

HC MVD (Russian: ХК МВД) was a professional ice hockey club based in Balashikha, Moscow Oblast, Russia. They were members of the Tarasov Division of the Kontinental Hockey League. They are best known for winning the silver medal in the KHL backstopped by all star goaltender Michael Garnett in 2010. The team merged with Dynamo Moscow to form UHC Dynamo after the 2009–10 season.

== History ==
MVD Moscow Oblast was founded in 1949 as Spartak Kalinin, and adopted its last name, MVD, in 2004 as part of the Russian Ministry of Internal Affairs and their move to Podolsk. In the same year, they qualified for the Russian Superleague play-off for the first time, losing to Ak Bars Kazan in a hard-fought series. In 2007, they moved again (this time to Balashikha) for the KHL size arena.

Since the season 2009–10 was formed the new team Sheriff Balashikha as a farm team of HC Dynamo Moscow in the newly created JHL.

In the season 2010/2011, after the unification of the basic commands HC MVD and HC Dynamo Moscow into the United Hockey Club "Dynamo" (Moscow), farm clubs of the same teams were also united and made their debut in the restructured Higher Hockey League VHL as part of the newly formed "Dinamo" (Tver), and the youth team, dubbed Sheriff Balashikha JHL, was moved to Tver to home arena the Ice Palace of sports "Jubilee".

In the season 2011/2012, both farm teams, the youth — renamed Dynamo Balashikha (in the VHL), and the junior hockey team, renamed HC MVD-junior (playing in the JHL), returned to the town Balashikha near Moscow with home ice Palace "Balashikha-arena". At this time in the Junior League, the team plays on the name of HC MVD.

== Farm clubs ==
- 2007–2009 HC MVD Balashikha First League
- 2009–2010 Sheriff Balashikha JHL
