= Kharlamov Division =

- Conference: Eastern Conference
- League: Kontinental Hockey League
- Sport: Ice hockey
- First season: 2008–09
- No. of teams: 7
- Most recent champion: Ak Bars Kazan (6th title)
- Most titles: Ak Bars Kazan (6 titles)

The KHL's Kharlamov Division was formed in 2008 as part of the league's inauguration. It is one of four divisions and part of the Eastern Conference since the second season of the KHL when the conferences were established. It is named in honor of 3x Olympic medalist and Hockey Hall of Fame inductee Valeri Kharlamov.

== Division lineup ==
The Kharlamov Division is made up of the following teams:

- (Russia) Ak Bars Kazan
- (Russia) Avtomobilist Yekaterinburg
- (Russia) HC Lada Togliatti
- (Russia) Metallurg Magnitogorsk
- (Russia) Neftekhimik Nizhnekamsk
- (Russia) Torpedo Nizhny Novgorod
- (Russia) Traktor Chelyabinsk

== Lineup history ==
=== Initial lineup (2008) ===
In the first KHL season, the division alignment was determined by team strength and the Kharlamov Division consisted of: Lokomotiv Yaroslavl, Amur Khabarovsk, Avangard Omsk, Dinamo Riga, Lada Togliatti and Sibir Novosibirsk.

=== Re-alignment in 2009 ===
With the geographical alignment of the divisions for the 2009–10 season, the composition of the Kharlamov Division was completely changed. Only Lada Togliatti remained and was joined by Ak Bars Kazan, Metallurg Magnitogorsk, Traktor Chelyabinsk, Neftekhimik Nizhnekamsk and Avtomobilist Yekaterinburg.

=== Yugra replaces Lada (2010) ===
After Lada Togliatti had to withdraw from the KHL in 2010, they were replaced by Yugra Khanty-Mansiysk from Khanty-Mansiysk.

=== 2013 Expansion and re-alignment ===
With the addition of two teams in 2013, Torpedo Nizhny Novgorod moved from the Tarasov Division to this division in order to balance out the two conferences.

=== 2014 changes ===
Lada Togliatti returned to the league after a four-year absence and Torpedo Nizhny Novgorod has been moved back to the Tarasov Division.

=== 2018 Lada and Yugra VHL ===
Torpedo Nizhny Novgorod returns to the division, though Yugra Khanty-Mansiysk and Lada Togliatti leave the division and league altogether due to poor performance; they join the VHL.

=== 2019 Expansion and re-alignment ===
Sibir Novosibirsk returns to the division after 11 years in the Chernyshev Division, and Torpedo Nizhny Novgorod returns to Tarasov Division and the Western Conference altogether.

=== 2020 Expansion and re-alignment ===
Torpedo Nizhny Novgorod returns to the division a third time from the Bobrov Division. Sibir Novosibirsk leaves the division and returns to the Chernyshev Division.

== Division winners ==
- 2021: (Russia) Ak Bars Kazan (90 points)
- 2020: (Russia) Ak Bars Kazan (93 points)
- 2019: (Russia) Avtomobilist Yekaterinburg (95 points)
- 2018: (Russia) Ak Bars Kazan (100 points)
- 2017: (Russia) Metallurg Magnitogorsk (124 points)
- 2016: (Russia) Metallurg Magnitogorsk (103 points)
- 2015: (Russia) Ak Bars Kazan (120 points)
- 2014: (Russia) Metallurg Magnitogorsk (108 points)
- 2013: (Russia) Ak Bars Kazan (104 points)
- 2012: (Russia) Traktor Chelyabinsk (114 points – Continental Cup winner)
- 2011: (Russia) Ak Bars Kazan (105 points)
- 2010: (Russia) Metallurg Magnitogorsk (115 points)
- 2009: (Russia) Lokomotiv Yaroslavl (111 points)

== Gagarin Cup winners produced ==
- 2018: (Russia) Ak Bars Kazan
- 2016: (Russia) Metallurg Magnitogorsk
- 2014: (Russia) Metallurg Magnitogorsk
- 2010: (Russia) Ak Bars Kazan
