= Eastern Conference (KHL) =

Hockey league conference

- League: Kontinental Hockey League
- Sport: Ice hockey
- Founded: 2009
- No. of teams: 12
- Most recent champion: Avangard Omsk
- Most titles: Ak Bars Kazan & Metallurg Magnitogorsk & Avangard Omsk (3 titles)

The Eastern Conference (Russian: Восточная Конференция) is one of two conferences in the Kontinental Hockey League (KHL). Its counterpart is the Western Conference.

== Divisions ==
Kharlamov Division	Chernyshev Division
(Russia) Ak Bars Kazan; (Russia) Avtomobilist Yekaterinburg; (Russia) Metallurg Magnitogorsk; (Russia) Neftekhimik Nizhnekamsk; (Russia) Torpedo Nizhny Novgorod; (Russia) Traktor Chelyabinsk	(Russia) Amur Khabarovsk; (Russia) Avangard Omsk; (Kazakhstan) Barys Nur-Sultan; (China) Kunlun Red Star Beijing; (Russia) Salavat Yulaev Ufa; (Russia) Sibir Novosibirsk

== Eastern Conference Cup winners ==
Season	Winner
2009–10	**Ak Bars Kazan**
2010–11	**Salavat Yulaev Ufa**
2011–12	Avangard Omsk
2012–13	Traktor Chelyabinsk
2013–14	**Metallurg Magnitogorsk**
2014–15	Ak Bars Kazan
2015–16	**Metallurg Magnitogorsk**
2016–17	Metallurg Magnitogorsk
2017–18	**Ak Bars Kazan**
2018–19	Avangard Omsk
2019–20	–
2020–21	**Avangard Omsk**

Team in **Bold**	=	Gagarin Cup winner in same season

== Notes ==
1. 2020 Gagarin Cup playoffs were cancelled due to the COVID-19 pandemic

== See also ==
- Kontinental Hockey League team changes
