= Western Conference (KHL) =

- League: Kontinental Hockey League
- Sport: Ice hockey
- Founded: 2008
- No. of teams: 11
- Most recent champion: CSKA Moscow
- Most titles: CSKA Moscow (4 titles)

The Western Conference (Russian: Западная Конференция) is one of two conferences in the Kontinental Hockey League (KHL) used to divide teams. Its counterpart is the Eastern Conference.

== Divisions ==
Bobrov Division	Tarasov Division
(Russia) SKA Saint Petersburg; (Russia) Sochi; (Russia) Spartak Moscow; (Russia) Vityaz Podolsk	(Russia) CSKA Moscow; (Belarus) Dinamo Minsk; (Russia) Dynamo Moscow; (Russia) Lokomotiv Yaroslavl; (Russia) Severstal Cherepovets

== Western Conference Cup winners ==
Season	Winner
2009–10	HC MVD
2010–11	Atlant Moscow Oblast
2011–12	**Dynamo Moscow**
2012–13	**Dynamo Moscow**
2013–14	Lev Praha
2014–15	**SKA Saint Petersburg**
2015–16	CSKA Moscow
2016–17	**SKA Saint Petersburg**
2017–18	CSKA Moscow
2018–19	**CSKA Moscow**
2019–20	–
2020–21	CSKA Moscow

Team in **Bold**	=	Gagarin Cup winner in same season

== Notes ==
1. 2020 Gagarin Cup playoffs were cancelled due to the COVID-19 pandemic

== See also ==
- Kontinental Hockey League team changes
