= Bobrov Division =

KHL division

- Conference: Western Conference
- League: Kontinental Hockey League
- Sport: Ice hockey
- First season: 2008–09
- No. of teams: 5
- Most recent champion: SKA Saint Petersburg (10th title)
- Most titles: SKA Saint Petersburg (10 titles)

The KHL's Bobrov Division was formed in 2008 as part of the league's inauguration and is part of the Western conference since the second season of KHL when the conferences were established. It is one of 4 divisions. It is named in honor of Vsevolod Bobrov; storied ice hockey gold medalist for the Soviet Union and former CSKA and VVS player.

== Division lineup ==
The Bobrov Division is currently made up of the following teams:

- (Russia) SKA Saint Petersburg
- (Russia) Sochi
- (Russia) Spartak Moscow
- (Russia) Torpedo Nizhny Novogorod
- (Russia) Vityaz Podolsk

== Lineup history ==
=== Initial lineup (2008) ===
In the first KHL season, the division alignment was determined by team strength and the Bobrov division consisted of: Salavat Yulaev Ufa, Atlant Moscow Oblast, HC Dinamo Minsk, Metallurg Novokuznetsk, Severstal Cherepovets and Spartak Moscow.

=== Re-alignment in 2009 ===
With the geographical alignment of the divisions for the 2009–10 season, the composition of the Bobrov division was completely changed. Only Spartak Moscow and Dinamo Minsk remained in the division. They were joined by the two other teams from Moscow, CSKA Moscow and Dynamo Moscow, as well as SKA Saint Petersburg and Dinamo Riga. Thus, the division was made up of the most westerly teams of the KHL.

=== Dynamo-MVD merger (2010) ===
In 2010, Dynamo Moscow merged with HC MVD (from the Tarasov Division). The new team, UHC Dynamo, took the place of the old Dynamo in this division. Dinamo Minsk left for the Tarasov Division and was replaced by HC Lev Poprad in this division. However, later Lev was excluded from the league and the Bobrov Division became the first division in the history of the KHL to have the number of teams at 5 instead of 6.

=== 2011 expansion ===
In 2011, the KHL expanded for the first time beyond the borders of the post-Soviet states by admitting HC Lev Poprad, a newly formed team that is based in Poprad, Slovakia.

=== 2012 expansion ===
The expansion to 26 teams for the 2012–13 season caused some re-alignments among the Western conference divisions. The two newcomers Slovan Bratislava from Slovakia and HC Donbass from Ukraine were added to the Bobrov division. In the meantime, two Moscow teams, Spartak and CSKA were moved to the Tarasov Division, while Vityaz Chekhov moved to Bobrov. HC Lev Poprad was dissolved and replaced by a new organization, Lev Praha from Prague, Czech Republic. This brought the number of teams in the Bobrov division to 7, representing 5 different countries.

=== 2013 expansion and re-alignment ===
The expansion to 28 teams for the 2013–14 season caused some re-alignments among the Western conference divisions; as such, Croatian newcomer KHL Medveščak Zagreb were added to the Borbov division, while HC Vityaz, HC Donbass and Dynamo Moscow were moved to the Tarasov Division and replaced by Dinamo Minsk and CSKA Moscow.

=== 2014 expansion to Helsinki ===
Lev Praha had to withdraw prior to the 2014–15 season for financial reasons, whereas Jokerit from Helsinki, Finland joined. Furthermore, CSKA Moscow and Atlant Moscow Oblast also joined.

=== 2015 Spartak returns ===
Spartak Moscow returned to the KHL for the 2015–16 season, while Atlant Moscow Oblast left the league.

=== 2017 Medveščak Zagreb leaving ===
KHL Medveščak Zagreb left the KHL and returned to EBEL for the 2017–18 season.

=== 2018 expansion and re-alignment ===
Dynamo Moscow and Severstal Cherepovets joining, both Slovan Bratislava and Dinamo Minsk swapped divisions to Tarasov Division.

=== 2020 expansion and re-alignment ===
Sochi and Vityaz Podolsk joining Bobrov division, but Dinamo Riga and Dynamo Moscow swapped divisions to Tarasov Division.

=== 2021 changes ===
Severstal Cherepovets leaving Bobrov Division and joining Tarasov Division

== Division winners ==
- 2021: (Russia) SKA Saint Petersburg (82 points)
- 2020: (Russia) SKA Saint Petersburg (93 points)
- 2019: (Russia) SKA Saint Petersburg (103 points)
- 2018: (Russia) SKA Saint Petersburg (138 points – Continental Cup winner)
- 2017: (Russia) SKA Saint Petersburg (137 points)
- 2016: (Finland) Jokerit (108 points)
- 2015: (Russia) SKA Saint Petersburg (123 points)
- 2014: (Russia) SKA Saint Petersburg (105 points)
- 2013: (Russia) SKA Saint Petersburg (115 points – Continental Cup winner)
- 2012: (Russia) SKA Saint Petersburg (113 points)
- 2011: (Russia) UHC Dynamo (96 points)
- 2010: (Russia) SKA Saint Petersburg (122 points)
- 2009: (Russia) Salavat Yulaev Ufa (129 points)

== Gagarin Cup winners produced ==
- 2017: (Russia) SKA Saint Petersburg
- 2015: (Russia) SKA Saint Petersburg
- 2013: (Russia) Dynamo Moscow
- 2012: (Russia) Dynamo Moscow

== Season results ==
^{(#)}	Denotes team that won the Gagarin Cup
^{(#)}	Denotes team that won the KHL conference finals, but lost Gagarin Cup finals
^{(#)}	Denotes team that qualified for the playoffs
‡	Denotes winner of the Continental Cup
