= Tarasov Division =

Kontinental Hockey League division

- Conference: Western Conference
- League: Kontinental Hockey League
- Sport: Ice hockey
- First season: 2008–09
- No. of teams: 6
- Most recent champion: CSKA Moscow (11th title)
- Most titles: CSKA Moscow (11 titles)

The Kontinental Hockey League's (KHL) Tarasov Division was formed in 2008 as part of the league's inauguration. It is one of four divisions and part of the Western Conference since the second season of the KHL when the conferences were established. It is named in honor of Hockey Hall of Fame inductee Anatoli Tarasov, "the father of Russian hockey", who established the Soviet Union as "the dominant force in international competition".

== Division lineup ==
The Tarasov Division currently consists of the following teams:

- (Russia) CSKA Moscow
- (Belarus) Dinamo Minsk
- (Russia) Dynamo Moscow
- (China) Shanghai Dragons
- (Russia) Lokomotiv Yaroslavl
- (Russia) Severstal Cherepovets

== Lineup history ==
=== Initial lineup (2008) ===
In the first KHL season, the division alignment was determined by team strength and the Tarasov division consisted of: CSKA Moscow, HC MVD, Khimik Voskresensk, Metallurg Magnitogorsk, Traktor Chelyabinsk and SKA Saint Petersburg.

=== Re-alignment in 2009 ===
With the geographical alignment of the divisions for the 2009–10 season, the composition of the Tarasov division was completely changed and only HC MVD remained in the division. It was joined by two other teams from the Moscow region, Atlant Moscow Oblast and Vityaz Chekhov, as well as by Lokomotiv Yaroslavl, Torpedo Nizhny Novgorod and Severstal Cherepovets.

=== Minsk replaces HC MVD (2010) ===
First, HC Budivelnyk from Kyiv, Ukraine were admitted to the league in 2010 to replace HC MVD after their merger with Dynamo Moscow. However, the team later dropped out of the league before the start of the season and instead Dinamo Minsk joined the division from the Bobrov Division.

=== Lokomotiv Yaroslavl suspension (2011) ===
Because of the 2011 Lokomotiv Yaroslavl plane crash that killed nearly the entire roster of Lokomotiv Yaroslavl, the team management decided to suspend operations for the 2011–12 season, temporarily reducing the Tarasov division to five teams. Lokomotiv returned for the 2012–13 season.

=== 2012 Expansion ===
With the addition of two new teams to the Bobrov Division for the 2012–13 season, some re-alignments among the Western conference divisions became necessary: Vityaz Chekhov were moved to Bobrov, while two Moscow teams, Spartak and CSKA were moved to Tarasov. This increased the Tarasov division to seven teams.

=== 2013 Expansion and re-alignment ===
With the addition of two new teams to the league in the 2013–14 season, new re-alignments become necessary, therefore Torpedo Nizhny Novgorod was moved to the Kharlamov Division and CSKA Moscow and Dinamo Minsk left for the Bobrov Division. In exchange, HC Vityaz, HC Donbass and Dynamo Moscow were moved from Bobrov to Tarasov Division.

=== 2014 changes ===
HC Donbass had to withdraw prior to the 2014–15 season because of the political instability in Ukraine, and Spartak Moscow had to leave for financial reasons. Meanwhile, HC Sochi joined the league as a new team and Torpedo Nizhny Novgorod moved back from the Eastern Conference. Furthermore, CSKA Moscow and Atlant Moscow Oblast swapped divisions.

=== 2018 changes ===
Slovan Bratislava and Dinamo Minsk joins from Bobrov Division to Tarasov Division, buth Dynamo Moscow and Severstal Cherepovets leaves to Bobrov Division, buth Torpedo Nizhny Novgorod returns to Kharlamov Division.

=== 2019 Slovan Bratislava leaves ===
Torpedo Nizhny Novgorod returns to Tarasov Division from Kharlamov Division but Slovan Bratislava leaves Tarasov Division, and also from KHL, because of their low score and bad playing in KHL, but they return to Slovak Extraliga.

=== 2020 changes ===
Dinamo Riga and Dynamo Moscow joins to Tarasov Division from Bobrov Division, buth Sochi and Vityaz Podolsk leaves to Bobrov Division, buth Torpedo Nizhny Novgorod Returns again to Kharlamov Division.

=== 2021 Expansion ===
Severstal Cherepovets Returns to Tarasov Division from Bobrov Division

== Division winners ==
- 2024: (Russia) Dynamo Moscow (98 points)
- 2023: (Russia) CSKA Moscow (94 points)
- 2022: (Russia) Dynamo Moscow (64 points)
- 2021: (Russia) CSKA Moscow (91 points – Continental Cup winner)
- 2020: (Russia) CSKA Moscow (94 points – Continental Cup winner)
- 2019: (Russia) CSKA Moscow (106 points – Continental Cup winner)
- 2018: (Russia) CSKA Moscow (124 points)
- 2017: (Russia) CSKA Moscow (137 points – Continental Cup winner)
- 2016: (Russia) CSKA Moscow (127 points – Continental Cup winner)
- 2015: (Russia) CSKA Moscow (139 points – Continental Cup winner)
- 2014: (Russia) Dynamo Moscow (115 points – Continental Cup winner)
- 2013: (Russia) CSKA Moscow (96 points)
- 2012: (Russia) Torpedo Nizhny Novgorod (91 points)
- 2011: (Russia) Lokomotiv Yaroslavl (108 points)
- 2010: (Russia) HC MVD (102 points)
- 2009: (Russia) CSKA Moscow (106 points)

== Gagarin Cup winners produced ==
- 2019: (Russia) CSKA Moscow
- 2022: (Russia) CSKA Moscow
