= Chernyshev Division =

Ice hockey division in Russia

- Conference: Eastern Conference
- League: Kontinental Hockey League
- Sport: Ice Hockey
- First season: 2008–09
- No. of teams: 7
- Most recent champion: Barys Astana (3rd title)
- Most titles: Avangard Omsk (5 titles)

The KHL's Chernyshev Division was formed in 2008 as part of the league's inauguration. It is one of 4 divisions and part of the Eastern conference since the second season of KHL when the conferences were established. It is named in honor of Arkady Chernyshev; Soviet Master of Sports, IIHF Hall of Fame inductee and former Dynamo Moscow head coach.

== Division lineup ==
The Chernyshev Division is made up of the following teams:

- (Russia) Admiral Vladivostok
- (Russia) Amur Khabarovsk
- (Russia) Avangard Omsk
- (Kazakhstan) Barys Astana
- (Russia) Salavat Yulaev Ufa
- (Russia) Sibir Novosibirsk

== Lineup history ==
=== Initial lineup (2008) ===
In the first KHL season, the division alignment was determined by team strength and the Chernyshev Division consisted of: Ak Bars Kazan, Barys Astana, Dynamo Moscow, Neftekhimik Nizhnekamsk, Torpedo Nizhny Novgorod and Vityaz Chekhov.

=== Re-alignment in 2009 ===
With the geographical alignment of the divisions for the 2009–10 season, the composition of the Chernyshev division was completely changed. Only Barys Astana remained and was joined by Avangard Omsk, Salavat Yulaev Ufa, Sibir Novosibirsk, Amur Khabarovsk and Metallurg Novokuznetsk. It thus became the division with the most easterly located teams.

=== 2013 Expansion ===
Newcomer Admiral Vladivostok, who joined the KHL in the 2013–14 season, was added to the Chernyshev Division.

=== 2016 Far East Expansion ===
Newcomer Kunlun Red Star Beijing from China, who joined the KHL as an expansion team in the 2016–17 season, was added to the Chernyshev Division.

== Division Champions ==
- 2020: (Kazakhstan) Barys Nur-Sultan (84 points)
- 2019: (Kazakhstan) Barys Nur-Sultan (86 points)
- 2018: (Russia) Salavat Yulaev Ufa (93 points)
- 2017: (Russia) Avangard Omsk (109 points)
- 2016: (Russia) Avangard Omsk (106 points)
- 2015: (Russia) Sibir Novosibirsk (111 points)
- 2014: (Kazakhstan) Barys Astana (94 points)
- 2013: (Russia) Avangard Omsk (102 points)
- 2012: (Russia) Avangard Omsk (93 points)
- 2011: (Russia) Avangard Omsk (118 points – Continental Cup winner)
- 2010: (Russia) Salavat Yulaev Ufa (129 points – Continental Cup winner)
- 2009: (Russia) Ak Bars Kazan (122 points)

== Gagarin Cup winners produced ==
- 2021: (Russia) Avangard Omsk
- 2011: (Russia) Salavat Yulaev Ufa
- 2009: (Russia) Ak Bars Kazan
