= 2018 Channel One Cup =

Tournament details
- Host countries: Russia; Finland
- Cities: Moscow; Saint Petersburg; Tampere
- Venues: 3 (in 3 host cities)
- Dates: 13–16 December 2018
- Teams: 5

Final positions
- Champions: Russia (17th title)
- Runners-up: Sweden
- Third place: Finland
- Fourth place: Czech Republic

Tournament statistics
- Games played: 6
- Goals scored: 36 (6 per game)
- Attendance: 115,957 (19,326 per game)
- Scoring leader(s): (Russia) Mikhail Grigorenko (Russia) Nikita Gusev (5 points)

The 2018 Channel One Cup was played between 13 and 16 December 2018. Czech Republic, Finland, Sweden and Russia played in the tournament. One match was played in Tampere, Finland, one game in Saint Petersburg and the rest was played in CSKA Arena in Moscow, Russia. The tournament was part of 2018–19 Euro Hockey Tour. It was won by Russia.

== Standings ==
Pos	Team	Pld	W	OTW	OTL	L	GF	GA	GD	Pts
1	Russia	3	2	1	0	0	15	4	+11	8
2	Sweden	3	1	0	1	1	7	8	−1	4
3	Finland	3	1	0	1	1	6	11	−5	4
4	Czech Republic	3	0	1	0	2	8	13	−5	2

Source: eurohockey

== Games ==
All times are local. Moscow/Saint Petersburg – (Moscow Time – UTC+3) Tampere – (Eastern European Time – UTC+2)

13 December 2018; 18:30	Finland	3-4 GWS (1-0, 2-0, 0-3) (OT: 0–0) (SO: 0–1)	Czech Republic	Ice Stadium, Tampere; Attendance: 6,299

Game reference

Joni Ortio
Goalies
Šimon Hrubec
Referees:
(Sweden) Mikael Nord
(Sweden) Linus Öhlund

Hakulinen (Virtanen, Rajala) – 18:53	1-0
Puustinen (Junttila) – 22:57	2-0
Rajala (Hakanpää) – 27:21	3-0
	3-1	42:08 – Bulíř (Sekac, Zamorsky)
	3-2	24:50 – Lenc (Zamorsky, Jordan)
	3-3	51:24 – Kundratek (Sekac, Roman)

Shootout
Kubalík
8 min
Penalties
2 min
33
Shots
32

13 December 2018; 18:45	Sweden	2-3 GWS (1-0, 1-0,0-2) (OT: 0–0) (SO: 0–1)	Russia	CSKA Arena, Moscow; Attendance: 8,000

Game reference

Lars Johansson
Goalies
Ilya Sorokin
Referees:
(Finland) Kristian Vikman
(Finland) Lassi Heikkinen

Holm (Fjällby, Dahlbäck) – 05:58	1-0
Dahlbäck (Kellman, Boqvist) – 33:26	2-0
	2-1	43:24 – Grigorenko (Nesterov) (PP)
	2-2	44:25 – Gavrikov (Andronov, Kadeikin)

Shootout
Grigorenko
6 min
Penalties
8 min
25
Shots
35

15 December 2018; 11:30	Finland	3-2 (0-1, 1-1, 2-0)	Sweden	CSKA Arena, Moscow; Attendance: 8,873

Game reference

Rasmus Tirronen
Goalies
Adam Reideborn
Referees:
(Russia) Yury Oskirko
(Russia) Evgeny Romasko

	0-1	04:24 – Lindqvist (Kellman, Boqvist) (PP)
	0-2	25:02 – Larsson (Norman, Wedin)
Palve (Leskinen) – 37:04 (PP)	1-2
Kalapudas (Leskinen, Puustinen) – 42:34	2-2
Lajunen (Rajala, Hietanen) – 57:20	3-2

12 min
Penalties
24 min
25
Shots
12

15 December 2018; 15:45	Russia	7-2 (2-1, 3-0, 2-1)	Czech Republic	CSKA Arena, Moscow; Attendance: 12,491

Game reference

Ilya Sorokin
Goalies
Šimon Hrubec
Referees:
(Finland) Lassi Heikkinen
(Finland) Kristian Vikman

Tokranov (Plotnikov, Gusev) (PP) – 04:16	1-0
	1-1	05:08 – Kubalík (Nemec)
Prokhorkin (Plotnikov, Gusev) (PP) – 07:48	2-1
Loktionov (Grigorenko) – 23:40	3-1
Kaprizov (Grigorenko, Nesterov) – 32:09	4-1
Kuzmenko (Kablukov) – 37:07	5-1
Kuzmenko – 42:27	6-1
	6-2	53:02 – Kubalík (SHG)
Loktionov (Tokranov, Gusev) (PP) – 56:06	7-2

18 min
Penalties
34 min
34
Shots
18

16 December 2018; 14:00	Czech Republic	2-3 (1-0, 1-2, 0-1)	Sweden	CSKA Arena, Moscow; Attendance: 8,913

Game reference

Patrik Bartošák
Goalies
Lars Johansson
Referees:
(Russia) Yuri Oskirko
(Russia) Evgeny Romasko

Zohorna (Nemec, Hanzl) – 13:19	1-0
Zdráhal (Beránek) – 28:21	2-0
	2-1	29:34 – Larsson (Pettersson, Wedin)
	2-2	34:06 – Larsson (Pettersson)
	2-3	56:54 – Lindqvist (Dahlbäck)

8 min
Penalties
6 min
31
Shots
28

16 December 2018; 17:00	Russia	5-0 (1-0, 3-0, 1-0)	Finland	Gazprom Arena, Saint Petersburg; Attendance: 71,381

Game reference

Igor Shesterkin
Goalies
Joni Ortio

Kaprizov (Yelesin, Grigorenko) – 19:00	1-0
Tokranov (Gusev, Plotnikov) (PP) – 25:28	2-0
Nesterov (Kuzmenko, Shalunov) (PP) – 29:21	3-0
Vladislav Gavrikov (Barabanov, Tokranov) – 30:10	4-0
Grigorenko (Shalunov, Blazhievsky) – 54:39	5-0

6 min
Penalties
6 min
37
Shots
24

== Scoring leaders ==
Pos	Player	Country	GP	G	A	Pts	+/−	PIM	POS
1	Mikhail Grigorenko	Russia	3	2	3	5	+3	0	F
2	Nikita Gusev	Russia	3	0	5	5	-1	0	F
3	Vasily Tokranov	Russia	3	2	2	4	+2	2	D
4	Emil Larsson	Sweden	3	3	0	3	+3	2	F
5	Andrei Kuzmenko	Russia	3	2	1	3	+1	0	F

GP = Games played; G = Goals; A = Assists; Pts = Points; +/− = Plus/minus; PIM = Penalties in minutes; POS = Position
Source: quanthockey

== Goaltending leaders ==
Pos	Player	Country	TOI	GA	GAA	Sv%	SO
1	Lars Johansson	Sweden	125:00	4	1.92	93.75	0
2	Ilya Sorokin	Russia	124:18	4	1.93	90.70	0
3	Šimon Hrubec	Czech Republic	85:00	5	3.53	88.89	0
4	Joni Ortio	Finland	125:00	8	3.84	88.24	0

TOI = Time on ice (minutes:seconds); SA = Shots against; GA = Goals against; GAA = Goals Against Average; Sv% = Save percentage; SO = Shutouts
Source: swehockey
