= 2018 Karjala Tournament =

2018 Karjala Tournament (Euro Hockey Games)
Tournament details
- Host countries: Finland; Czechia
- Cities: Helsinki; Prague
- Venues: 2 (in 2 host cities)
- Dates: 8–11 November 2018
- Teams: 4

Final positions
- Champions: Russia (8th title)
- Runners-up: Finland
- Third place: Czech Republic
- Fourth place: Sweden

Tournament statistics
- Games played: 6
- Goals scored: 26 (4.33 per game)
- Attendance: 48,786 (8,131 per game)
- Scoring leader: (Czech Republic) Dominik Kubalík (4 points)

Official website
- leijonat.com

The 2018 Karjala Tournament was played between 8 and 11 November 2018. The Czech Republic, Finland, Sweden and Russia played a round-robin for a total of three games per team and six games in total. One match was played in Prague, Czech Republic, the rest of the matches were played in Helsinki, Finland. Russia won the tournament. The tournament was part of 2018–19 Euro Hockey Tour.

== Standings ==
Pos	Team	Pld	W	OTW	OTL	L	GF	GA	GD	Pts
1	Russia	3	2	0	0	1	9	6	+3	6
2	Finland	3	2	0	0	1	6	3	+3	6
3	Czech Republic	3	1	0	0	2	7	8	−1	3
4	Sweden	3	1	0	0	2	4	9	−5	3

Source: eurohockey

== Games ==
All times are local. Helsinki – (Eastern European Time – UTC+2) Prague – (Central European Time – UTC+1)

8 November 2018; 18:20	Czech Republic	2-3 (1-1, 1-2, 0-0)	Sweden	Tipsport Arena, Prague; Attendance: 9,723

Game reference

Jakub Kovar
Goalies
Lars Johansson
Referees:
(Russia) Roman Gofman
(Russia) Yuri Oskirko

	0-1	08:30 – Jakob Lilja (Emil Larsson)
10:31 – Milan Doudera (Dominik Kubalík)	1-1
	1-2	28:41 – Nick Sörensen (Lukas Bengtsson, Mikael Wikstrand)
	1-3	32:44 – Jonathan Davidsson (Joakim Nygård)
34:36 – Jan Kolar (Jiri Sekac)	2-3

8 min
Penalties
8 min
26
Shots
25

8 November 2018; 18:30	Russia	3-0 (2-0, 1-0, 0-0)	Finland	Helsinki Halli, Helsinki; Attendance: 9,052

Game reference

Ilya Sorokin
Goalies
Juha Metsola
Referees:
(Sweden) Mikael Nord
(Sweden) Mikael Holm

04:08 – Mikhail Grigorenko (Andrei Loktionov)	1-0
11:15 – Nikita Nesterov (Mikhail Grigorenko, Kirill Kaprizov) (PP)	2-0
34:40 – Andrei Pedan (Ivan Telegin, Yevgeny Ketov)	3-0

10 min
Penalties
6 min
21
Shots
28

10 November 2018; 13:00	Sweden	1-4 (0-0, 0-2, 1-2)	Russia	Helsinki Halli, Helsinki; Attendance: 3,552

Game reference

Magnus Hellberg
Goalies
Igor Shesterkin
Referees:
(Finland) Mikko Kaukokari
(Finland) Joonas Kova

	0-1	30:48 – Andrei Kuzmenko (Alexander Barabanov, Dinar Khafizullin)
	0-2	38:40 – Yevgeny Ketov (SHG)
45:18 – Jakob Lilja (Lukas Bengtsson, Joel Persson) (PP)	1-2
	1-3	50:04 – Andrei Kuzmenko (Alexei Byvaltsev, Maxim Shalunov) (PP)
	1-4	58:11 – Andrei Loktionov (Ivan Telegin, Alexei Byvaltsev) (EN)

12 min
Penalties
10 min
31
Shots
32

10 November 2018; 17:30	Finland	3-0 (1-0, 2-0, 0-0)	Czech Republic	Helsinki Halli, Helsinki; Attendance: 11,350

Game reference

Veini Vehviläinen
Goalies
Patrik Bartošák
Referees:
(Sweden) Mikael Nord
(Sweden) Mikael Holm

12:24 – Arttu Ruotsalainen (Harri Pesonen, Teemu Kivihalme)	1-0
26:28 – Joonas Nättinen	2-0
32:16 – Sakari Manninen	3-0

6 min
Penalties
6 min
26
Shots
18

11 November 2018; 13:30	Czech Republic	5-2 (1-2, 2-0, 2-0)	Russia	Helsinki Halli, Helsinki; Attendance: 3,020

Game reference

Patrik Bartošák
Goalies
Ilya Sorokin
Referees:
(Finland) Lassi Heikkinen
(Finland) Kristian Vikman

	0-1	02:45 – Kirill Kaprizov (Nikita Nesterov, Nikita Nesterov, Alexei Vasilevsky) (PP)
11:28 – Michal Repik (Roman Horak, Rudolf Cerveny)	1-1
	1-2	16:08 – Alexei Vasilevsky (Mikhail Grigorenko, Kirill Kaprizov) (PP)
21:16 – Dominik Kubalík	2-2
33:40 – Dominik Kubalík (Jan Štencel, Robin Hanzl)	3-2
58:59 – Radovan Pavlík (Michal Repik) (EN)	4-2
59:27 – Dominik Kubalík (Roman Horak) (EN)	5-2

21
Shots
23

11 November 2018; 17:30	Finland	3-0 (1-0, 1-0, 1-0)	Sweden	Helsinki Halli, Helsinki; Attendance: 12,089

Game reference

Veini Vehviläinen
Goalies
Lars Johansson
Referees:
(Czech Republic) Vladimir Pešina
(Czech Republic) David Prazak

07:49 – Ville Leskinen (Arttu Ruotsalainen, Mikko Lehtonen) (PP)	1-0
21:37 – Teemu Eronen (Ville Leskinen, Harri Pesonen)	2-0
56:21 – Jani Hakanpää (Marko Anttila)	3-0

20 min
Penalties
10 min
27
Shots
22

== Scoring leaders ==
Pos	Player	Country	GP	G	A	Pts	+/−	PIM	POS
1	Dominik Kubalík	Czech Republic	3	3	1	4	+5	2	F
2	Mikhail Grigorenko	Russia	3	1	2	3	-2	0	F
3	Kirill Kaprizov	Russia	3	1	2	3	-3	0	F
4	Jakob Lilja	Sweden	3	2	0	2	-1	0	F
5	Andrei Kuzmenko	Russia	3	2	0	2	+1	0	F

GP = Games played; G = Goals; A = Assists; Pts = Points; +/− = Plus/minus; PIM = Penalties in minutes; POS = Position
Source: quanthockey

== Goaltending leaders ==
Pos	Player	Country	TOI	GA	GAA	Sv%	SO
1	Magnus Hellberg	Sweden	91:19	3	1.97	93.62	1
2	Mikko Koskinen	Finland	120:00	3	1.50	92.86	0
3	Ilya Sorokin	Russia	178:35	7	2.35	91.76	0
4	Jhonas Enroth	Sweden	87:08	3	2.07	91.67	0
5	Ben Scrivens	Canada	176:04	8	2.73	89.47	0
6	Eero Kilpeläinen	Finland	60:00	3	3.00	89.29	0
7	Marek Mazanec	Czech Republic	120:00	7	3.50	88.14	0
8	Jonas Hiller	Switzerland	118:07	9	4.57	85.48	0
9	Pavel Francouz	Czech Republic	59:42	5	5.03	79.17	0

TOI = Time on ice (minutes:seconds); SA = Shots against; GA = Goals against; GAA = Goals Against Average; Sv% = Save percentage; SO = Shutouts
Source: swehockey
