= 2016 Kontinental Hockey League All-Star Game =

2016 KHL All-Star Game
	1	2	3	Total
Team East	6	12	5	23
Team West	10	7	11	28
- Date: 23 January 2016
- Arena: VTB Ice Palace
- City: Moscow, Russia
- Attendance: 11,753

The 2016 Kontinental Hockey League All-Star Game took place on January 23, 2016 at the VTB Ice Palace in Moscow, Russia, home of Dynamo Moskva, during the 2015–16 KHL season. Before the game, the players competed in the KHL skills competition.

== Final roster ==
The first six players for each conference were chosen via a fan vote. The next six were chosen by media and accredited journalists. The final five were selected by the KHL's competition committee.

Team West
Nat.	Player	Team	Pos.	Num.
(Russia)	Alexei Murygin	Lokomotiv Yaroslavl	G	30
(Canada)	Mat Robinson	Dynamo Moskva	D	37
(Russia)	Nikita Zaitsev	CSKA Moskva	D	22
(Russia)	Ilya Kovalchuk	SKA Saint Petersburg	LW	17
(Russia)	Alexander Radulov (C)	CSKA Moscow	RW	47
(Canada)	Matt Ellison	Dinamo Minsk	RW	10
(Russia)	Ilya Sorokin	CSKA Moskva	G	90
(Canada)	Cam Barker	Slovan Bratislava	D	55
(Denmark)	Philip Larsen	Jokerit Helsinki	D	36
(Russia)	Nikita Gusev	SKA Saint Petersburg	LW	97
(Russia)	Vadim Shipachyov	SKA Saint Petersburg	RW	87
(Russia)	Daniil Apalkov	Lokomotiv Yaroslavl	RW	40
(Slovakia)	Milan Jurčina	Medveščak Zagreb	D	68
(Russia)	Ziyat Paygin	HC Sochi	D	8
(Canada)	Brandon Kozun	Jokerit Helsinki	LW	51
(Russia)	Dmitri Kagarlitsky	Severstal Cherepovets	RW	18
(Latvia)	Kaspars Daugaviņš	Torpedo Nizhny Novgorod	LW	16
(France)	Stéphane Da Costa	CSKA Moskva	LW	77
Head coach: Dmitri Kvartalnov				–

Team East
Nat.	Player	Team	Pos.	Num.
(Czech Republic)	Alexander Salák	Sibir Novosibirsk	G	53
(Belarus)	Vladimir Denisov	Traktor Chelyabinsk	D	44
(Russia)	Alexander Loginov	Salavat Yulaev Ufa	D	19
(Russia)	Sergei Mozyakin (C)	Metallurg Magnitogorsk	LW	10
(Sweden)	Linus Omark	Salavat Yulaev Ufa	LW	67
(Czech Republic)	Vladimír Sobotka	Avangard Omsk Oblast	RW	17
(Finland)	Juha Metsola	Amur Khabarovsk	G	77
(Latvia)	Oskars Bārtulis	Admiral Vladivostok	D	37
(Kazakhstan)	Kevin Dallman	Barys Astana	D	38
(Russia)	Anatoly Golyshev	Avtomobilist Yekaterinburg	C	15
(Russia)	Danis Zaripov	Metallurg Magnitogorsk	RW	25
(Czech Republic)	Jan Kovář	Metallurg Magnitogorsk	C	43
(United States)	Jonathon Blum	Admiral Vladivostok	D	24
(Sweden)	Tobias Viklund	Lada Togliatti	D	16
(Russia)	Mikhail Varnakov	Ak Bars Kazan	LW	18
(Russia)	Kirill Kaprizov	Metallurg Novokuznetsk	RW	7
(Kazakhstan)	Nigel Dawes	Barys Astana	C	9
Head coach: Andrei Skabelka				–

Withdrawn

Prior to the draft several players withdrew due to injury:

Nat.	Name	Team	Pos.	Reason and replacement
(Russia)	Ilya Kovalchuk	SKA Saint Petersburg	RW	Injury, replaced by Stephane Da Costa

Though Kaspars Daugaviņš participated in the skills competition, he would not play in the match due to an illness. He was not replaced.

== Game summary ==
January 23, 2016; 19:00	Team West	28 – 23 (10 - 6, 7 - 12, 11 - 5)	Team East	VTB Ice Palace; Attendance: 11,753

Game reference

Alexei Murygin
Ilya Sorokin
Goalies
Alexander Salák
Juha Metsola
Referees:
(Russia) Alexei Anisimov
(Russia) Rafael Kadyrov
Linesmen:
(Russia) Gleb Lazarev
(Russia) Dmitry Sivov

	0 - 1	Omark (Mozyakin, Sobotka)
	0 - 2	Mozyakin (Omark)
	0 - 3	Dallman (Zaripov)
	0 - 4	Zaripov (Golyshev, Dallman)
Kozun (Paygin, Ellison)	1 - 4
Ellison (Robinson, Kozun)	2 - 4
Ellison (Radulov, Murygin)	3 - 4
	3 - 5	Zaripov (Golyshev, Dallman)
Shipachyov (Gusev)	4 - 5
Kagarlitsky (Kozun)	5 - 5
Da Costa (Jurčina, Paygin)	6 - 5
Kozun (Da Costa, Kagarlitsky)	7 - 5
	7 - 6	Mozyakin (Omark)
Da Costa (Radulov, Zaitsev)	8 - 6
Shipachyov (Gusev, Barker)	9 - 6
Kozun (Kagarlitsky, Paygin)	10 - 6
	10 - 7	Mozyakin (Omark)
	10 - 8	Zaripov (Golyshev, Kovář)
	10 - 9	Varnakov (Kaprizov)
	10 - 10	Omark (Mozyakin)
Gusev	11 - 10
Jurčina (Kagarlitsky)	12 - 10
	12 - 11	Golyshev (Zaripov)
Radulov	13 - 11
	13 - 12	Dawes
	13 - 13	Kaprizov (Dawes)
	13 - 14	Mozyakin
	13 - 15	Mozyakin
	13 - 16	Golyshev (Kovář)
Ellison (Radulov)	14 - 16
	14 - 17	Dawes (Zaripov, Dallman)
Larsen (Apalkov, Shipachyov)	15 - 17
	15 - 18	Kaprizov (Varnakov)
Kozun (Kagarlitsky)	16 - 18
Ellison (Kagarlitsky)	17 - 18
	17 - 19	Denisov (Omark)
Ellison (Da Costa, Radulov)	18 - 19
Apalkov (Shipachyov)	19 - 19
	19 - 20	Golyshev
Kozun	20 - 20
Ellison (Da Costa)	21 - 20
Shipachyov (Gusev, Apalkov)	22 - 20
Ellison (Kagarlitsky, Kozun)	23 - 20
Da Costa (Radulov)	24 - 20
	24 - 21	Kaprizov (Varnakov)
Gusev (Shipachyov)	25 - 21
Gusev (Apalkov)	26 - 21
	26 - 22	Mozyakin (Omark, Denisov)
Da Costa (Kozun)	27 - 22
	27 - 23	Zaripov
Apalkov (Jurčina, Radulov)	28 - 23

0 min
Penalties
0 min
71
Shots
73
