= 2019 Carlson Hockey Games =

2019 Carlson Hockey Games (Euro Hockey Games)
Tournament details
- Host countries: Czechia; Sweden
- Cities: Brno; Stockholm
- Venues: 2 (in 2 host cities)
- Dates: 1–5 May 2019
- Teams: 4

Final positions
- Champions: Sweden (4th title)
- Runners-up: Finland
- Third place: Russia
- Fourth place: Czech Republic

Tournament statistics
- Games played: 6
- Goals scored: 30 (5 per game)
- Attendance: 50,255 (8,376 per game)
- Scoring leader: (Russia) Evgeny Kuznetsov (5 points)

The 2019 Carlson Hockey Games was played between 1 and 5 May 2019. The Czech Republic, Finland, Sweden and Russia played a round-robin for a total of three games per team and six games in total. Five of the games were played in Pardubice, Czech Republic, and one game in Stockholm, Sweden. The tournament was won by the Sweden. The tournament was part of the 2018–19 Euro Hockey Tour.

== Standings ==
Pos	Team	Pld	W	OTW	OTL	L	GF	GA	GD	Pts
1	Sweden	3	2	0	0	1	8	8	0	6
2	Finland	3	2	0	0	1	7	5	+2	6
3	Russia	3	1	0	0	2	9	10	−1	3
4	Czech Republic	3	1	0	0	2	6	7	−1	3

Source: swehockey
- Sweden won the tournament after winning the head-to-head game against Finland

== Games ==
All times are local. Brno – (Central European Summer Time – UTC+2) Stockholm – (Central European Summer Time – UTC+2)

1 May 2019; 15:00	Sweden	6–4 (1–1, 3–1, 2–2)	Russia	Ericsson Globe, Stockholm; Attendance: 13,447

Game reference

Jacob Markström
Goalies
Andrei Vasilevskiy
Referees:
(Finland) Lassi Heikkinen
(Finland) Aaro Brännare
Linesmen:
(Sweden) Andreas Malmqvist
(Sweden) Daniel Persson

02:37 – Joakim Nygård (Jesper Bratt)	1–0
	1–1	18:08 – Alexander Yelesin (Nikita Gusev, Nikita Kucherov)
20:57 – Loui Eriksson (Anton Lander, Elias Pettersson) (PP)	2–1
23:04 – Marcus Krüger (Lukas Bengtsson, Dennis Rasmussen)	3–1
	3–2	30:54 – Sergei Andronov (Sergei Plotnikov, Nikita Gusev)
38:17 – Oskar Lindblom (Jesper Bratt, Elias Pettersson) (PP)	4–2
46:37 – Loui Eriksson (Anton Lander, Elias Pettersson)	5–2
	5–3	49:58 – Mikhail Grigorenko (Artem Anisimov, Nikita Nesterov)
57:52 – Mario Kempe (Loui Eriksson, Anton Lander)	6–3
	6–4	49:53 – Mikhail Grigorenko (Artem Anisimov, Nikita Nesterov)

6 min
Penalties
18 min
38
Shots
23

2 May 2019; 17:30	Finland	3–2 (1–0, 1–1, 1–1)	Czech Republic	Winning Group Arena, Brno; Attendance: 7,700

Game reference

Juho Olkinuora
Goalies
Jakub Kovář
Referees:
(Russia) Konstantin Olenin
(Russia) Evgeny Romasko
Linesmen:
(Czech Republic) Miroslav Lhotský
(Czech Republic) Jiří Ondráček

19:44 – Sakari Manninen (Henri Jokiharju, Mikko Lehtonen)	1–0
33:04 – Petteri Lindbohm	2–0
	2–1	39:32 – Filip Hronek (Jakub Voráček) (PP)
58:42 – Sakari Manninen (Mikko ehtonen)	3–1
	3–2	59:32 – Radko Gudas (Dominik Simon) (PP)

20 min
Penalties
4 min
21
Shots
41

4 May 2019; 14:00	Russia	1–3 (0–1, 0–1, 1–1)	Finland	Winning Group Arena, Brno; Attendance: 7,132

Game reference

Alexandar Georgiev
Goalies
Kevin Lankinen
Referees:
(Czech Republic) Antonín Jeřábek
(Czech Republic) Vladimir Pešina
Linesmen:
(Finland) Daniel Hynek
(Finland) Jiří Svoboda

	0–1	05:00 – Harri Pesonen (PP)
	0–2	30:27 – Mikko Lehtonen (Toni Rajala, Kaapo Kakko) (PP)
	0–3	45:51 – Oliver Kaski (Sakari Manninen, Niko Ojamäki) (PP)
59:09 – Alexander Ovechkin (Evgeny Kuznetsov, Artem Anisimov)	1–3

8 min
Penalties
8 min
22
Shots
29

4 May 2019; 18:30	Czech Republic	3–0 (1–0, 0–0, 2–0)	Sweden	Winning Group Arena, Brno; Attendance: 7,700

Game reference

Henrik Lundqvist
Goalies
Patrik Bartošák
Referees:
(Russia) Konstantin Olenin
(Russia) Evgeny Romasko
Linesmen:
(Czech Republic) Jiri Gebauer
(Czech Republic) Tomáš Brejcha

07:04 – Dmitrij Jaškin (David Sklenička)	1–0
57:53 – Ondřej Palát	2–0
58:49 – Jakub Voráček (Jan Rutta)	3–0

6 min
Penalties
8 min
23
Shots
22

5 May 2019; 14:00	Sweden	2–1 (2–1, 0–0, 0–0)	Finland	Winning Group Arena, Brno; Attendance: 6,576

Game reference

Jacob Markström Jhonas Enroth
Goalies
Kevin Lankinen
Referees:
(Czech Republic) Antonín Jeřábek
(Czech Republic) Pavel Hodek
Linesmen:
(Czech Republic) Jiri Gebauer
(Czech Republic) Josef Spúr

	0–1	05:12 – Veli-Matti Savinainen (Kaapo Kakko, Arttu Ilomäki) (PP)
08:07 – Dennis Rasmussen (Marcus Krüger, Erik Gustafsson)	1–1
12:24 – Elias Lindholm (Loui Eriksson, Elias Pettersson) (PP)	2–1

14 min
Penalties
14 min
30
Shots
32

5 May 2019; 18:00	Czech Republic	1–4 (1–1, 0–2, 0–1)	Russia	Winning Group Arena, Brno; Attendance: 7,700

Game reference

Jakub Kovář
Goalies
Andrei Vasilevskiy
Referees:
(Sweden) Andreas Harnebring
(Sweden) Mikael Holm
Linesmen:
(Czech Republic) Daniel Hynek
(Czech Republic) Jiří Svoboda

	0–1	11:14 – Kirill Kaprizov (Alexander Ovechkin, Evgeny Kuznetsov)
15:40 – Michal Řepík (David Musil)	1–1
	1–2	27:53 – Evgeny Kuznetsov (Artem Anisimov)
	1–3	34:49 – Dmitry Orlov) (Evgeny Kuznetsov, Alexander Ovechkin)
	1–4	57:31 – Evgeny Kuznetsov (Kirill Kaprizov, Alexander Ovechkin)

14 min
Penalties
8 min
24
Shots
23

== Scoring leaders ==
Pos	Player	Country	GP	G	A	Pts	+/−	PIM	POS
1	Evgeny Kuznetsov	Russia	2	2	3	5	+5	2	RW
2	Loui Eriksson	Sweden	3	2	2	4	+2	0	RW
3	Alexander Ovechkin	Russia	2	1	3	4	+4	0	LW
4	Elias Pettersson	Sweden	3	0	4	4	+2	2	CE
5	Sakari Manninen	Finland	2	2	1	3	+2	2	LW

GP = Games played; G = Goals; A = Assists; Pts = Points; +/− = Plus/minus; PIM = Penalties in minutes; POS = Position
Source: swehockey

== Goaltending leaders ==
Pos	Player	Country	TOI	GA	GAA	Sv%	SO
1	Kevin Lankinen	Finland	120:00	3	1.50	94.23	0
2	Andrei Vasilevskiy	Russia	118:13	6	3.05	90.16	0
3	Jacob Markström	Sweden	99:23	5	3.02	89.36	0
4	Jakub Kovář	Czech Republic	118:27	5	2.53	88.10	0

TOI = Time on ice (minutes:seconds); SA = Shots against; GA = Goals against; GAA = Goals Against Average; Sv% = Save percentage; SO = Shutouts
Source: swehockey
