= Mikhail Varnakov =

Mikhail Varnakov may refer to:

- Mikhail Varnakov (ice hockey, born 1957), Soviet player for HC Torpedo Nizhny Novgorod
- Mikhail Varnakov (ice hockey, born 1985), Russian player for Ak Bars Kazan
