= 2018–19 Euro Hockey Tour =

Tournament details
- Venues: 9 (in 8 host cities)
- Dates: 8 November 2018 – 5 May 2019
- Teams: 4

Final positions
- Champions: Russia (8th title)
- Runners-up: Finland
- Third place: Sweden
- Fourth place: Czech Republic

Tournament statistics
- Games played: 24
- Goals scored: 127 (5.29 per game)
- Attendance: 249,548 (10,398 per game)
- Scoring leader: (Russia) Mikhail Grigorenko (10 points)

The 2018–19 Euro Hockey Tour was the 23rd season of Euro Hockey Tour. It started in November 2018 and lasted until May 2019. It consisted of Karjala Tournament, Channel One Cup, Sweden Hockey Games and Carlson Hockey Games.

== Standings ==
Pos	Team	Pld	W	OTW	OTL	L	GF	GA	GD	Pts
1	Russia	12	6	2	0	4	41	27	+14	22
2	Finland	12	5	1	2	4	27	29	−2	19
3	Sweden	12	5	0	2	5	29	37	−8	17
4	Czech Republic	12	4	1	0	7	30	34	−4	14

Source: Euro Hockey Tour

== Karjala Tournament ==
The Karjala Cup was played between 8–11 November 2018. Five of the matches were played in Helsinki, Finland and one match in Prague, Czech Republic. The tournament was won by Russia.

Pos	Team	Pld	W	OTW	OTL	L	GF	GA	GD	Pts
1	Russia	3	2	0	0	1	9	6	+3	6
2	Finland	3	2	0	0	1	6	3	+3	6
3	Sweden	3	1	0	0	2	4	9	−5	3
4	Czech Republic	3	1	0	0	2	7	8	−1	3

Source: Swehockey

8 November 2018
Czech Republic	2–3	Sweden
Russia	3–0	Finland
10 November 2018
Sweden	1–4	Russia
Finland	3–0	Czech Republic
11 November 2018
Czech Republic	5–2	Russia
Finland	3–0	Sweden

== Channel One Cup ==
The 2018 Channel One Cup was played between 13 and 16 December 2018. Four matches were played in Moscow, Russia, one match was held in Tampere, Finland and one match as an outdoor game in Saint Petersburg, Russia. The tournament was won by Russia.

Pos	Team	Pld	W	OTW	OTL	L	GF	GA	GD	Pts
1	Russia	3	2	1	0	0	15	4	+11	8
2	Finland	3	1	0	1	1	6	11	−5	4
3	Sweden	3	1	0	1	1	7	8	−1	4
4	Czech Republic	3	0	1	0	2	8	13	−5	2

Source: Swehockey

13 December 2018
Finland	3–4 (GWS)	Czech Republic
Sweden	2–3 (GWS)	Russia
15 December 2018
Finland	3–2	Sweden
Russia	7–2	Czech Republic
16 December 2018
Czech Republic	2–3	Sweden
Russia	5–0	Finland

== Sweden Hockey Games ==
The 2019 Sweden Hockey Games were played between 7–10 February 2019. Five of the games were played in Stockholm, Sweden and one game in Yaroslavl, Russia. The tournament was won by Czech Republic.

Pos	Team	Pld	W	OTW	OTL	L	GF	GA	GD	Pts
1	Czech Republic	3	2	0	0	1	9	6	+3	6
2	Russia	3	1	1	0	1	8	7	+1	5
3	Sweden	3	1	0	1	1	10	12	−2	4
4	Finland	3	0	1	1	1	8	10	−2	3

Source: Swehockey

7 February 2019
Russia	3–2 (GWS)	Finland
Czech Republic	5–2	Sweden
9 February 2019
Finland	1–3	Czech Republic
Sweden	4–2	Russia
10 February 2019
Russia	3–1	Czech Republic
Sweden	4–5 (GWS)	Finland

== Carlson Hockey Games ==
The 2019 Carlson Hockey Games were played between 1–5 May 2019. Five of the games were played in Brno, Czech Republic and one game in Stockholm, Sweden. Tournament was won by Sweden.

Pos	Team	Pld	W	OTW	OTL	L	GF	GA	GD	Pts
1	Sweden	3	2	0	0	1	8	8	0	6
2	Finland	3	2	0	0	1	7	5	+2	6
3	Russia	3	1	0	0	2	9	10	−1	3
4	Czech Republic	3	1	0	0	2	6	7	−1	3

Source: Swehockey

1 May 2019
Sweden	6–4	Russia
2 May 2019
Finland	3–2	Czech Republic
4 May 2019
Russia	1–3	Finland
Czech Republic	3–0	Sweden
5 May 2019
Sweden	2–1	Finland
Czech Republic	1–4	Russia
