= KHL Best Sniper Award =

- Sport: Ice hockey
- Awarded for: Kontinental Hockey League's top goal scorer

History
- First award: 2008–09 KHL season
- Most recent: Josh Leivo

The KHL Best Sniper Award is awarded annually to the leading goal scorer in the Kontinental Hockey League (KHL). The current holder is Dmitrij Jaskin of Dynamo Moscow, who scored 32 goals during the 2020–21 season.

== Winners ==
Key

Player is active in the KHL

Season	Winner	Team	Goals	Games	#
2008–09	Jan Marek	Metallurg Magnitogorsk	35	53	1
2008–09	Pavel Brendl	Torpedo Nizhny Novgorod	35	56	1
2009–10	Marcel Hossa	Dinamo Riga	35	56	1
2010–11	Roman Červenka	Avangard Omsk	31	54	1
2011–12	Brandon Bochenski	Barys Astana	27	49	1
2012–13	Sergei Mozyakin	Metallurg Magnitogorsk	35	48	1
2013–14	Sergei Mozyakin	Metallurg Magnitogorsk	34	54	2
2014–15	Steve Moses	Jokerit	36	60	1
2015–16	Sergei Mozyakin	Metallurg Magnitogorsk	32	57	3
2016–17	Sergei Mozyakin	Metallurg Magnitogorsk	48	60	4
2017–18	Nigel Dawes	Barys Astana	35	46	1
2018–19	Kirill Kaprizov	CSKA Moscow	30	57	1
2019–20	Kirill Kaprizov	CSKA Moscow	33	57	2
2020–21	Dmitrij Jaškin	Dynamo Moscow	38	59	1
2021–22	Niko Ojamäki	HC Vityaz	29	48	1
2022–23	Dmitrij Jaškin	SKA Saint Petersburg	40	67	2
2023–24	Reid Boucher	Avangard Omsk	44	64	1
2024–25	Josh Leivo	Salavat Yulaev Ufa	49	62	1
