= Steve Moses =

American ice hockey player (born 1989)

- Born: August 9, 1989 (age 36) Leominster, Massachusetts, U.S.
- Height: 5 ft 9 in (175 cm)
- Weight: 175 lb (79 kg; 12 st 7 lb)
- Position: Winger
- Shoots: Right
- ELH team Former teams: BK Mladá Boleslav; Jokerit; SKA Saint Petersburg; SC Rapperswil-Jona Lakers; HC Ambrì-Piotta; HPK; HC Kometa Brno
- National team: United States
- NHL draft: Undrafted
- Playing career: 2012–present

Steve Christopher Moses (born August 9, 1989) is an American professional ice hockey forward currently under contract with Czech club, BK Mladá Boleslav of the Czech Extraliga. Quickness, scoring ability and shooting are considered to be the strongest sides of his gameplay, though his small size is considered a disadvantage in one-on-one situations.

== Playing career ==
=== Amateur ===
From 2005 to 2008, Moses played junior hockey with Boston Junior Bruins in Eastern Junior Hockey League (EJHL) and Empire Junior Hockey League (EmJHL). In the EJHL, Moses tallied a total of 96 points in 97 games.

In 2006, Moses was drafted in the 12th round, 209th overall, by the Quebec Major Junior Hockey League (QMJHL)'s Lewiston Maineiacs to play major junior hockey in the Canadian Hockey League (CHL). Instead, however, Moses opted to enroll at the University of New Hampshire and play for the Wildcats ice hockey team, where he ultimately played from 2008 to 2012.

In the 2010–11 season, Moses and New Hampshire won the Hockey East regular season championship title. The former was the Wildcats' third-highest scorer during the regular season, scoring 14 goals. For his performances, Moses was also selected to Hockey East's All-Academic Team.

In his final season at New Hampshire, in 2011–12, Moses was the team's highest goal-scorer, with 22. He was also the joint-third-highest scorer in the Hockey East, sharing his position with Barry Almeida of Boston College. Being the alternate captain of the Wildcats, Moses was the highest point-scorer on the team, with 35 points (22 goals and 13 assists), along with teammate Nick Sorkin (nine goals and 26 assists). After the season, Moses was awarded with Wildcats' Roger A. Leclerc Trophy (MVP of the team).

=== Professional ===
In March 2012, undrafted in any NHL entry draft, Moses had an amateur try-out with American Hockey League (AHL) team Connecticut Whale, playing eight regular season and one playoff game, scoring two goals.

On May 14, 2012, while unable to gain any NHL interest, Moses signalled the start of a European career upon signing with Finnish club Jokerit on a one-year deal. In his debut season in 2012–13, he enjoyed a successful year, contributing 22 goals and 38 points in 55 games. He recorded a hat-trick in a 4–0 victory against the Espoo Blues on December 19, 2012. Moses was subsequently signed to a two-year extension with Jokerit.

In his last season with Jokerit he led the team in their debut season in the Kontinental Hockey League in 2014-15 with 57 points in 60 games. With teammates Petr Koukal and Linus Omark Moses formed one of the most efficient lines in KHL that season, the so-called "LOKOMO line". In regular season Moses set the league's new goal scoring record with 36 goals. After the season Moses opted to end his tenure with Jokerit.

On April 9, 2015, Moses subsequently signed as a free agent to a one-year, $1 million contract with the NHL's Nashville Predators for the 2015–16 season. On September 30, 2015 the Predators reassigned Moses to affiliate the, Milwaukee Admirals of the AHL. With the expectations to push for an NHL recall, Moses was unable to produce offensively with the Admirals, posting 2 goals in 16 games. On November 19, 2015, as a signal his NHL chances with the Predators were limited, Moses KHL's rights were traded by Jokerit to defending champions, SKA Saint Petersburg. On December 3, Moses was placed on unconditional waivers by the Predators for the purpose of a mutual termination. Upon his release from the Predators he was signed two days later for the remainder of the season in a hasty return to the KHL with SKA Saint Petersburg.

Moses played parts of two seasons with SKA, before returning to North America for the 2017–18 season in signing a one-year AHL contract with the Rochester Americans on July 20, 2017. As of December 22, 2017, Moses was suspended indefinitely due to breech of contract. He recorded 7 goals and 16 points in 29 games with the club. On December 25, 2017, it was announced that Moses had agreed to a three-year contract in a return to the KHL with former club Jokerit.

At the conclusion of his contract with Jokerit, Moses ended his second tenure with the club, moving to the Swiss National League in signing a two-year contract with SC Rapperswil-Jona Lakers on March 27, 2020. In 2023 he signed for czech hockey giant HC Kometa Brno playing in Tipsport Extraliga

== Career statistics ==
=== Regular season and playoffs ===
			Regular season					Playoffs
Season	Team	League	GP	G	A	Pts	PIM	GP	G	A	Pts	PIM
2005–06	Boston Jr. Bruins	EmJHL	81	71	77	148	46	—	—	—	—	—
2005–06	Boston Jr. Bruins	EJHL	7	0	2	2	0	—	—	—	—	—
2006–07	Boston Jr. Bruins	EmJHL	59	41	53	94	144	—	—	—	—	—
2006–07	Boston Jr. Bruins	EJHL	45	26	21	47	26	4	2	3	5	4
2007–08	Boston Jr. Bruins	EJHL	45	11	36	47	22	4	1	3	4	0
2008–09	University of New Hampshire	HE	33	5	8	13	6	—	—	—	—	—
2009–10	University of New Hampshire	HE	39	6	18	24	20	—	—	—	—	—
2010–11	University of New Hampshire	HE	39	14	12	26	23	—	—	—	—	—
2011–12	University of New Hampshire	HE	37	22	13	35	16	—	—	—	—	—
2011–12	Connecticut Whale	AHL	8	2	0	2	2	1	0	0	0	0
2012–13	Jokerit	SM-l	55	22	16	38	24	2	0	0	0	0
2013–14	Jokerit	Liiga	42	12	11	23	14	1	0	0	0	4
2014–15	Jokerit	KHL	60	36	21	57	20	10	5	2	7	6
2015–16	Milwaukee Admirals	AHL	16	2	5	7	6	—	—	—	—	—
2015–16	SKA Saint Petersburg	KHL	21	10	6	16	0	13	2	4	6	4
2016–17	SKA Saint Petersburg	KHL	24	3	7	10	8	—	—	—	—	—
2017–18	Rochester Americans	AHL	29	7	9	16	4	—	—	—	—	—
2017–18	Jokerit	KHL	13	4	1	5	4	11	3	3	6	25
2018–19	Jokerit	KHL	59	15	25	40	20	4	0	0	0	0
2019–20	Jokerit	KHL	43	7	10	17	20	2	0	1	1	4
2020–21	SC Rapperswil-Jona Lakers	NL	42	12	17	29	18	11	3	4	7	6
2021–22	SC Rapperswil-Jona Lakers	NL	3	0	0	0	0	1	0	0	0	0
2021–22	HC Ambrì-Piotta Loan	NL	8	3	1	4	0	–	–	–	–	–
2022–23	HPK	Liiga	55	13	17	30	20	–	–	–	–	–
2023–24	HC Kometa Brno	ELH	52	20	13	33	14	6	3	0	3	2
Liiga totals			152	47	44	91	58	3	0	0	0	4
KHL totals			220	75	70	145	72	40	10	10	20	39
NL totals			53	15	18	33	18	12	3	4	7	6
ELH totals			52	20	13	33	14	6	3	0	3	2

Medal record

Representing United States

Ice hockey

World Championships
Bronze medal – third place	2015 Czech Republic	

=== International ===
Year	Team	Event	Result	GP	G	A	Pts	PIM
2015	United States	WC	3rd place, bronze medalist(s)	7	1	1	2	0
Senior totals				7	1	1	2	0

== Awards and honors ==
Award	Year
College
HE All-Academic Team	2011
KHL
All-Star Game	2015
First All-Star Team	2015
Best Sniper	2015
Gagarin Cup (SKA Saint Petersburg)	2017
