= Cam Barker =

Canadian ice hockey player (born 1986)

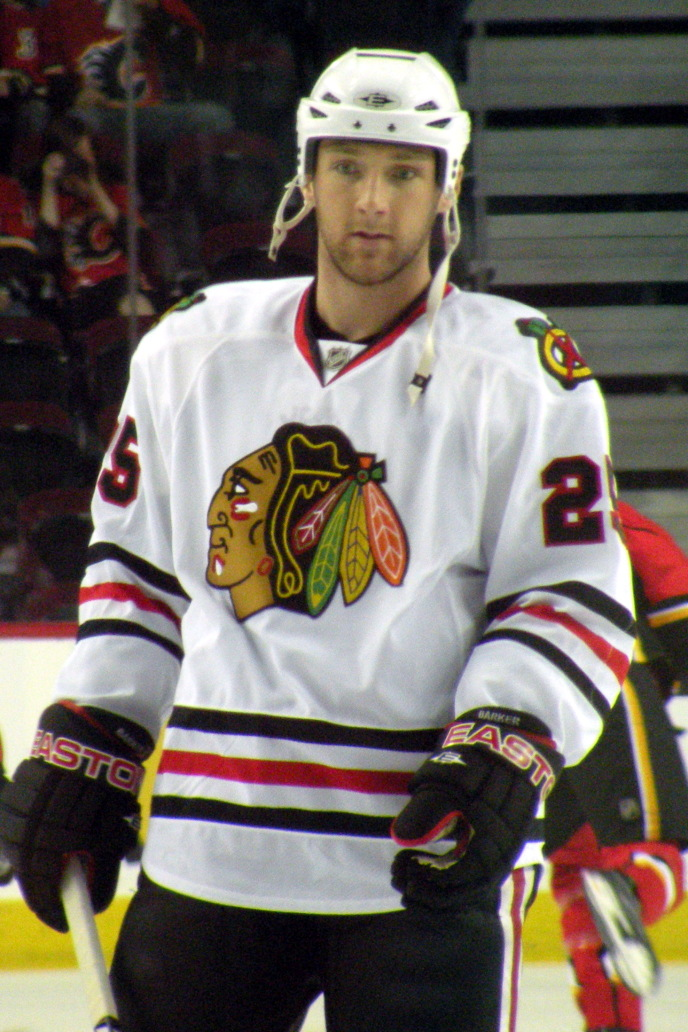
- Barker with the Chicago Blackhawks in 2009
- Born: April 4, 1986 (age 40) Winnipeg, Manitoba, Canada
- Height: 6 ft 3 in (191 cm)
- Weight: 215 lb (98 kg; 15 st 5 lb)
- Position: Defence
- Shot: Left
- Played for: Chicago Blackhawks; Minnesota Wild; Edmonton Oilers; Vancouver Canucks; Barys Astana; HC Slovan Bratislava; SCL Tigers; Ilves Tampere; Dragons de Rouen
- NHL draft: 3rd overall, 2004; Chicago Blackhawks
- Playing career: 2006–2021

Cameron Barker (born April 4, 1986) is a Canadian former professional ice hockey defenceman. He was selected third overall in the 2004 NHL entry draft by the Chicago Blackhawks and spent four seasons with the club before being traded to the Minnesota Wild in 2010. Internationally, Barker played for the Canadian national team and won back-to-back gold medals at the 2005 and 2006 World Junior Championships with the junior team.

== Playing career ==
As a youth, Barker played in the 2000 Quebec International Pee-Wee Hockey Tournament with the Winnipeg South Monarchs minor ice hockey team. He later played AAA Midget Hockey for the Winnipeg Thrashers at age 14. After that season he was drafted 4th overall in the 2001 WHL Bantam Draft by the Medicine Hat Tigers.

The following season, Barker moved east to play for the Gloucester Rangers and eventually the Cornwall (ON) Colts Jr.A. club of the Central Junior Hockey League (CJHL) before signing with the Tigers at the end of the same 2001–02 season.

Barker began his junior hockey career in 2001–02 with the Medicine Hat Tigers of the Western Hockey League (WHL), appearing in three games. In the following season, he led his team in scoring among defencemen with 47 points and was named to the WHL All-Rookie Team. He improved to a junior career-high 65 points in 60 games in 2003–04, leading the Tigers to a President's Cup championship. As WHL champions, they earned a berth in the 2004 Memorial Cup, however, Medicine Hat was defeated by the Gatineau Olympiques in the semi-final.

He was drafted third overall by the Chicago Blackhawks in the 2004 NHL entry draft and was signed to an entry-level contract by Chicago on August 22, 2005. He made the Blackhawks opening roster out of training camp in 2005–06 and made his NHL debut against the Colorado Avalanche, but was returned after one game to Medicine Hat, where he completed the season with 18 points in 26 games.

Barker began the 2006–07 season injured, having undergone ankle surgery in September. After recovering, he joined the Norfolk Admirals, Chicago's American Hockey League (AHL) affiliate, making his Norfolk debut on November 3, 2006. He recorded his first professional point on November 21 against the Manchester Monarchs, assisting on the game-winning overtime goal. A few games later, he scored his first professional goal on November 29 against the Bridgeport Sound Tigers in a 6–3 loss. Later in the season, he was called up by the Blackhawks and scored his first NHL goal on January 14, 2007, against the Minnesota Wild. He finished his rookie season playing in 35 games with Chicago and recording 8 points.

Despite finishing his rookie season with the Blackhawks, he was reassigned to the AHL to begin 2007–08. Joining the Rockford IceHogs in their inaugural AHL season (the team previously played in the United Hockey League), he assisted on the first-ever goal in IceHogs AHL history on October 6, 2007, against the Quad City Flames. Barker had been selected to play at the 2008 AHL All-Star Classic, but did not attend as he was once again recalled by the Blackhawks. In his second stint with the Blackhawks, he improved to six goals and 18 points in 45 games.

Barker did not make the Blackhawks cut for the start of the 2008–09 season and was assigned once again to Rockford. With the Blackhawks just under the salary cap, Barker's $2.8 million cap hit would have put them over the limit. However, general manager Dale Tallon asserted that Barker's demotion was not based on salary cap considerations. After 7 games with Rockford, he was called up by the Blackhawks and remained with the team. Barker finished the season with six goals, 34 assists, and a plus-minus of -6.

With Barker becoming a restricted free agent in the off-season, the NHL Players Association filed a grievance on July 6, 2009, against the Blackhawks on Barker's behalf for not extending a qualifying offer by the required deadline. As such, the NHLPA argued that Barker (as well as five other Blackhawks players in the same situation) qualified as an unrestricted free agent and could entertain offers from other teams around the league. The Blackhawks quickly came to terms with Barker the same day, re-signing him to a three-year contract worth US$9.25 million.

Given salary cap constraints caused by having to overpay Barker and others, he was traded on February 12, 2010, to the Minnesota Wild for defenceman Kim Johnsson and defensive prospect Nick Leddy. He was placed on waivers by Minnesota on June 28, 2011, to buy out his contract.

Barker signed a one-year contract worth $2.25 million with the Edmonton Oilers on July 1, 2011. On June 25, 2012, he was not tendered a contract and released as a free agent by the Oilers.

In September 2012, Barker was invited to the AHL's Texas Stars training camp and later made it to the main roster. Barker marked his first return to the AHL since 2008 by debuting for the Stars to start the 2012–13 season, on October 13 in a game against San Antonio Rampage. After 23 games with Texas, his professional try-out was not extended and he left the team.

On January 13, 2013, Barker signed a one-year contract worth $700,000 with the Vancouver Canucks. Barker was not re-signed by the Canucks and became an unrestricted free agent on July 5, 2013.

On November 5, 2013, Barker signed a one-year deal with Barys Astana of the Kontinental Hockey League (KHL). After spending the 2013–14 season in the KHL, Barker returned to North America and attended training camp with the Blackhawks on a player tryout offer. However, on September 27, 2014, the Blackhawks announced that they had released Barker, leaving him as an unrestricted free agent. On December 22, 2014, Barker signed a contract until the end of the 2014–15 KHL season with HC Slovan Bratislava, and then had his contract renewed for the 2015–16 season. He left Bratislava after two years to return to Barys Astana in May 2016.

After another shortened stint with Slovan Bratislava, Barker left the KHL and signed with the SCL Tigers of the Swiss National League (NL) on January 12, 2018, until the end of the 2017-18 season. In November 2018, he signed a contract until the end of season (including a try-out until the end of November) with Ilves Tampere but after playing seven games, his contract was terminated on try-out.

After spending his last two professional seasons in France with the Dragons de Rouen of the Ligue Magnus, Barker ended his 15-year playing career by retiring and accepting an assistant coaching role with a junior Canadian club, the Penticton Vees of the British Columbia Hockey League (BCHL), on June 23, 2021.

== International play ==
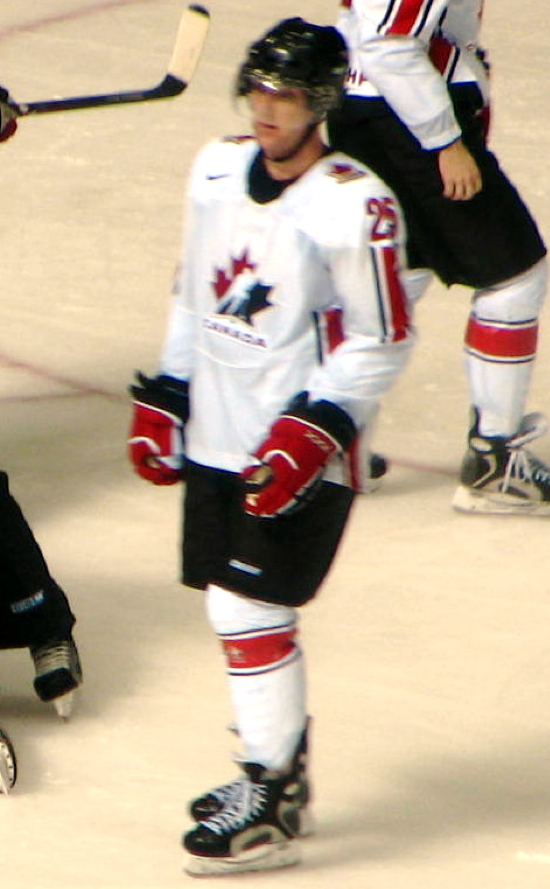
- Barker with Team Canada at the 2006 World Junior Championships

Medal record

Representing Canada

Ice hockey

World Junior Championships
Gold medal – first place	2006 Canada	
Gold medal – first place	2005 Canada	

Spengler Cup
Gold medal – first place	2012 Davos	

Barker was a part of Team Canada's gold medal-winning team at the 2005 World Junior Championships. However, he contracted mononucleosis midway through the tournament and was only able to appear in the first 3 games. Barker made his second straight World Junior appearance in 2006 as the only returning player on Team Canada's roster. He repeated as gold medal champion with Team Canada, which defeated Russia in the final.

== Career statistics ==
=== Regular season and playoffs ===
			Regular season					Playoffs
Season	Team	League	GP	G	A	Pts	PIM	GP	G	A	Pts	PIM
2001–02	Cornwall Colts	CJHL	72	6	23	29	132	—	—	—	—	—
2001–02	Medicine Hat Tigers	WHL	3	0	1	1	0	—	—	—	—	—
2002–03	Medicine Hat Tigers	WHL	64	10	37	47	79	11	3	4	7	17
2003–04	Medicine Hat Tigers	WHL	69	21	44	65	105	20	3	9	12	18
2004–05	Medicine Hat Tigers	WHL	52	15	33	48	99	12	3	3	6	16
2005–06	Chicago Blackhawks	NHL	1	0	0	0	0	—	—	—	—	—
2005–06	Medicine Hat Tigers	WHL	26	5	13	18	63	13	4	8	12	59
2006–07	Norfolk Admirals	AHL	34	5	10	15	53	6	1	3	4	13
2006–07	Chicago Blackhawks	NHL	35	1	7	8	44	—	—	—	—	—
2007–08	Rockford IceHogs	AHL	29	8	11	19	67	—	—	—	—	—
2007–08	Chicago Blackhawks	NHL	45	6	12	18	52	—	—	—	—	—
2008–09	Chicago Blackhawks	NHL	68	6	34	40	65	17	3	6	9	2
2009–10	Chicago Blackhawks	NHL	51	4	10	14	58	—	—	—	—	—
2009–10	Minnesota Wild	NHL	19	1	6	7	10	—	—	—	—	—
2010–11	Minnesota Wild	NHL	52	1	4	5	34	—	—	—	—	—
2011–12	Edmonton Oilers	NHL	25	2	0	2	23	—	—	—	—	—
2012–13	Texas Stars	AHL	23	3	5	8	24	—	—	—	—	—
2012–13	Vancouver Canucks	NHL	14	0	2	2	4	—	—	—	—	—
2013–14	Barys Astana	KHL	26	2	10	12	26	10	1	2	3	10
2014–15	Slovan Bratislava	KHL	18	0	9	9	19	—	—	—	—	—
2015–16	Slovan Bratislava	KHL	55	9	31	40	75	3	0	1	1	2
2016–17	Barys Astana	KHL	55	6	10	16	46	10	0	2	2	10
2017–18	Slovan Bratislava	KHL	37	2	8	10	18	—	—	—	—	—
2017–18	SCL Tigers	NL	3	1	1	2	27	—	—	—	—	—
2018–19	Ilves	Liiga	7	1	0	1	6	—	—	—	—	—
2019–20	Dragons de Rouen	FRA	12	2	7	9	28	4	0	1	1	0
2020–21	Dragons de Rouen	FRA	22	1	7	8	24	—	—	—	—	—
NHL totals			310	21	75	96	290	17	3	6	9	2
KHL totals			191	19	68	87	184	23	1	5	6	22

=== International ===
Year	Team	Event	Result	GP	G	A	Pts	PIM
2003	Canada	U18	4th	5	2	0	2	4
2005	Canada	WJC	1st place, gold medalist(s)	3	1	0	1	4
2006	Canada	WJC	1st place, gold medalist(s)	6	2	4	6	18
Junior totals				14	5	4	9	26

== Awards and honours ==
Award	Year
WHL
All-Rookie Team	2003
CHL All-Rookie Team	2003
Ed Chynoweth Cup (Medicine Hat Tigers)	2004
AHL
All-Star Game	2008
KHL
All-Star Game	2016
Most Points by Defenseman (40)	2016
Ligue Magnus
Champions (Dragons de Rouen)	2021

Awards and achievements
Preceded by Brent Seabrook	Chicago Blackhawks first-round draft pick 2004	Succeeded by Jack Skille
