= Ziyat Paigin =

Russian ice hockey player (born 1995)

- Born: 8 February 1995 (age 31) Togliatti, Russia
- Height: 6 ft 6 in (198 cm)
- Weight: 195 lb (88 kg; 13 st 13 lb)
- Position: Defence
- Shoots: Left
- VHL team Former teams: HC Tambov; Ak Bars Kazan; HC Sochi; Bakersfield Condors; Lokomotiv Yaroslavl; Neftekhimik Nizhnekamsk; Torpedo Nizhny Novgorod; Timrå IK; Avangard Omsk; Sibir Novosibirsk; Lada Togliatti; Kunlun Red Star
- NHL draft: 209th overall, 2015; Edmonton Oilers
- Playing career: 2014–present

Ziyat Asiyatovich Paigin (Russian: Зият Асиятович Пайгин; born 8 February 1995) is a Russian professional ice hockey defenceman who plays for HC Tambov of the Supreme Hockey League (VHL). He was selected with the Edmonton Oilers' last team pick in the 2015 NHL entry draft, 209th overall.

== Playing career ==
Paigin played youth hockey with Dizel Penza before he was drafted in the 2012 KHL Junior Draft, 82nd overall by Ak Bars Kazan. Paigin made his Kontinental Hockey League debut playing with Ak Bars Kazan during the 2014–15 KHL season registering a goal and an assist in 33 games.

In the following 2015–16 season, despite Paigin's size and potential he was unable to break into Kazan's blueline full-time and after 8 games was traded to HC Sochi on 10 October 2015. Inserted into a regular role on Sochi's defense, Paigin instantly broke out offensively, scoring 9 goals and 27 points in 37 games and as a result was selected to participate in the 2016 KHL All-Star Game.

In the off-season, despite Sochi's attempts to extend the contract of Paigin, he was traded back to original club, Ak Bars Kazan, in exchange for financial compensation on 2 May 2016. In the following 2016–17 season, Paigin failed to build upon his previous season's success with Sochi. With reduced ice-time and also hampered by injury, Paigin posted 1 goal and 4 points in 17 games with Ak Bars. Incurring a demotion with Bars Kazan of the VHL at seasons end, Paigin opted to pursue his NHL ambitions in agreeing to an amateur try-out contract with the Oilers American Hockey League affiliate, the Bakersfield Condors, on 5 April 2017. Paigin reportedly was not happy with his ice time and role within his KHL team. On 11 April 2017, Paigin was signed by the Oilers to a two-year entry-level contract.

In the 2017–18 season, after attending the Oilers' training camp, Paigin was among the first cuts reassigned to continue with the Condors. He appeared in just 7 scoreless games and also masked as a frequent healthy scratch before Paigin was placed on unconditional waivers by the Oilers in order for a mutual termination of his contract on 21 November 2017. On 15 December 2017, he returned to the KHL, signing a two-year contract with Lokomotiv Yaroslavl.

In the 2018–19 season, Paigin dressed in only 8 games with 1 assist for Lokomotiv before he was reassigned to the VHL with HC Lada Togliatti. On 7 December 2018, Paigin returned to the scene of his success, as he was traded by Yaroslavl to HC Sochi in exchange for financial compensation.

At the conclusion of the season, Paigin's reunion with Sochi was short lived as he was traded to HC Neftekhimik Nizhnekamsk in exchange for financial compensation on 8 July 2019. In the following 2019–20 season, Paigin made a career best 52 appearances with Neftekhimik, registering 12 points.

On 1 May 2020, Paigin as a free agent returned for a second stint with Lokomotiv Yaroslavl by agreeing to a two-year contract. He was later released by Lokomotiv, opting to move to fellow KHL club, Torpedo Nizhny Novgorod on 27 September 2020.

Paigin returned to Torpedo to begin the 2022–23 season, however after tallying 1 goal in 4 games he was traded to Avangard Omsk in exchange for financial compensation on 11 October 2022. He was immediately signed to a three-year, contract extension with Omsk.

Returning with Avangard Omsk for the 2023–24 season, Paigin was unable to replicate his previous seasons contributions in notching just 1 assist through 20 games. On 12 January 2024, having left Avangard, Paigin was signed for the remainder of the season with HC Sibir Novosibirsk.

On 8 May 2024, having left Sibir as a free agent, Paigin returned to hometown club on a one-year contract with, HC Lada Togliatti of the KHL. On November 26th, 2024, his deal with Lada Togliatti was terminated by mutual agreement. On 27 December 2024, Paigin signed a deal with Kunlun Red Star of the KHL for the remainder of the 2024–25 season.

On 24 July 2026, Paigin signed with HC Tambov of the Supreme Hockey League (VHL).

== Career statistics ==
=== Regular season and playoffs ===
			Regular season					Playoffs
Season	Team	League	GP	G	A	Pts	PIM	GP	G	A	Pts	PIM
2012–13	Bars Kazan	MHL	46	3	9	12	16	4	0	0	0	2
2013–14	Bars Kazan	MHL	47	3	8	11	14	12	0	1	1	2
2014–15	Ak Bars Kazan	KHL	33	1	1	2	2	2	0	0	0	0
2014–15	Bars Kazan	VHL	3	0	1	1	4	—	—	—	—	—
2015–16	Ak Bars Kazan	KHL	8	0	1	1	2	—	—	—	—	—
2015–16	Bars Kazan	VHL	10	1	4	5	2	—	—	—	—	—
2015–16	HC Sochi	KHL	37	9	18	27	8	4	0	0	0	2
2016–17	Ak Bars Kazan	KHL	17	1	3	4	4	—	—	—	—	—
2016–17	Bars Kazan	VHL	17	5	2	7	24	—	—	—	—	—
2016–17	Bakersfield Condors	AHL	5	0	0	0	2	—	—	—	—	—
2017–18	Bakersfield Condors	AHL	7	0	0	0	4	—	—	—	—	—
2017–18	Lokomotiv Yaroslavl	KHL	12	0	1	1	4	4	0	0	0	2
2018–19	Lokomotiv Yaroslavl	KHL	8	0	1	1	4	—	—	—	—	—
2018–19	Lada Togliatti	VHL	14	2	7	9	6	—	—	—	—	—
2018–19	HC Sochi	KHL	23	2	8	10	2	4	0	1	1	4
2019–20	Neftekhimik Nizhnekamsk	KHL	52	5	7	12	10	4	0	0	0	2
2020–21	Torpedo Nizhny Novgorod	KHL	40	6	8	14	16	4	0	0	0	2
2021–22	Torpedo Nizhny Novgorod	KHL	46	5	11	16	24	—	—	—	—	—
2021–22	Timrå IK	SHL	12	1	3	4	8	—	—	—	—	—
2022–23	Torpedo Nizhny Novgorod	KHL	4	1	0	1	0	—	—	—	—	—
2022–23	Avangard Omsk	KHL	50	3	4	7	20	14	2	2	4	6
2023–24	Avangard Omsk	KHL	20	0	1	1	16	—	—	—	—	—
2023–24	Omskie Krylia	VHL	7	3	2	5	0	—	—	—	—	—
2023–24	Sibir Novosibirsk	KHL	15	0	1	1	4	—	—	—	—	—
2024–25	Lada Togliatti	KHL	14	1	1	2	8	—	—	—	—	—
2024–25	Kunlun Red Star	KHL	7	0	1	1	2	—	—	—	—	—
KHL totals			386	34	67	101	126	36	2	3	5	18

=== International ===
Year	Team	Event	Result	GP	G	A	Pts	PIM
2015	Russia	WJC	2nd place, silver medalist(s)	7	1	2	3	20
Junior totals				7	1	2	3	20
