= Lars Johansson =

Lars Johansson may refer to:

- Lars (Lasse) Johansson (1638–1674), also known as Lucidor, Swedish baroque poet
- Lars Johansson (politician) (born 1950), member of the Riksdag
- Lars Johansson (musician), lead guitarist of Swedish doom metal band Candlemass
- Lars Johansson (bandy) (born 1976), Swedish bandy player
- Lars Johansson (ice hockey) (born 1987), Swedish ice hockey goaltender
- Lars Johansson (footballer), Swedish footballer
- Lars Johansson (sailor) (born 1953), Swedish Olympic sailor
- Lars Johansson (canoeist)
- Lars Johansson (basketball)
