= Ilya Sorokin =

Russian ice hockey player (born 1995)

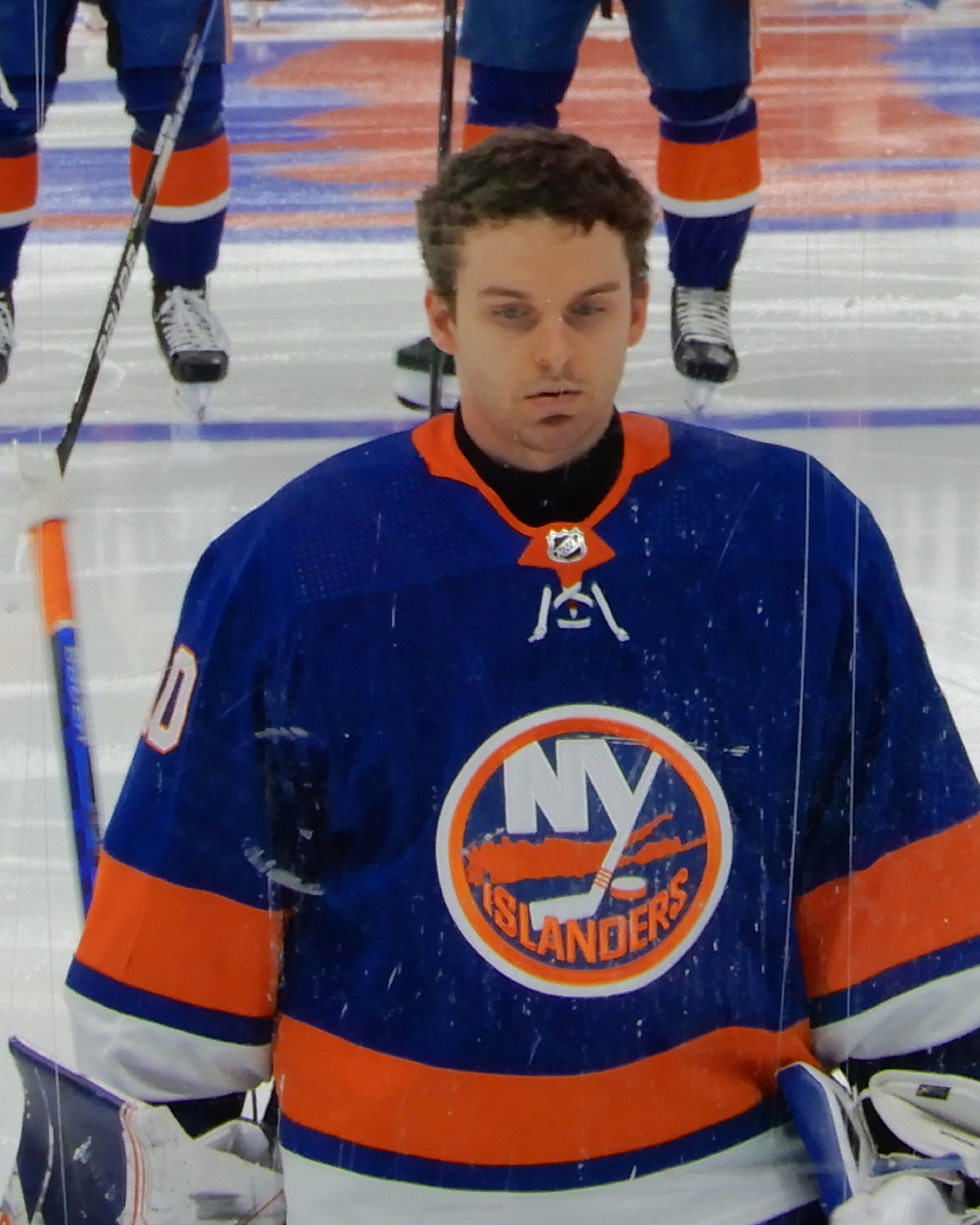
- Sorokin with the New York Islanders in 2021
- Born: 4 August 1995 (age 31) Mezhdurechensk, Russia
- Height: 6 ft 3 in (191 cm)
- Weight: 190 lb (86 kg; 13 st 8 lb)
- Position: Goaltender
- Catches: Left
- NHL team Former teams: New York Islanders; Metallurg Novokuznetsk; CSKA Moscow
- National team: Russia
- NHL draft: 78th overall, 2014; New York Islanders
- Playing career: 2012–present

Ilya Igorevich Sorokin (Russian: Илья Игоревич Сорокин; born 4 August 1995) is a Russian professional ice hockey player who is a goaltender for the New York Islanders of the National Hockey League (NHL). Sorokin was selected by the Islanders in the third round (78th overall) of the 2014 NHL entry draft.

== Playing career ==
=== KHL (2012–2020) ===
Sorokin played as a youth with local club Vympel Mezhdurechensk, before joining KHL club Metallurg Novokuznetsk as a 17-year old in 2012. He made his professional and KHL debut with Novokuznetsk during the following 2012–13 season, appearing in relief during a 8–6 defeat to Barys Astana on 7 January 2013. Following two promising seasons, Sorokin was selected by the New York Islanders, 78th overall, in the 2014 NHL entry draft.

During his third year within Metallurg Novokuznetsk in the 2014–15 season, Sorokin appeared in 22 games before he was traded to perennial powerhouse club, CSKA Moscow, in exchange for financial compensation on 24 December 2014.

Sorokin continued his KHL career with CSKA Moscow by signing a three-year contract extension on 10 June 2017. In 2019, Sorokin won the Gagarin Cup with CSKA Moscow, also being named most valuable player of the 2019 Gagarin Cup playoffs.

=== New York Islanders (2020–present) ===
On 13 July 2020, Sorokin was signed to a one-year, entry-level contract with draft club, the New York Islanders, for the remainder of the 2019–20 season. However, unsigned prospects from other leagues, such as Sorokin in the KHL, were ruled ineligible to feature in the Return to Play phase following the outbreak of the COVID-19 pandemic. The contract completed Sorokin's entry-level status to become a restricted free agent, and Sorokin was signed by the Islanders to a one-year, $2 million contract extension for the 2020–21 season the day after his entry-level contract was essentially nullified.

Sorokin made his NHL and Islanders debut on 16 January 2021, against the New York Rangers. Sorokin was originally slated to be the backup for the game when the intended starter, Semyon Varlamov, was injured during warmups. The Islanders lost the game 5–0, while Sorokin allowed five goals on 31 shots. Sorokin's first NHL win, and first NHL shutout, came on 16 February, in the Islanders' 3–0 win over the Buffalo Sabres. He made 20 saves in the win. Sorokin made his Stanley Cup playoffs debut against the Pittsburgh Penguins in game 1, winning 4–3 in overtime. while Varlamov recovered from injury. Varlamov took the starting role back in games 2 and 3 but struggled while playing through his injuries, losing both games. Sorokin took back the starting job in game 4 and won games 4–6, helping the Islanders win the series. Sorokin lost game 1 against the Boston Bruins in the second round, and Varlamov became the starting goaltender for the remainder of the playoffs.

On 1 September 2021, Sorokin was re-signed to a three-year, $12 million contract by the Islanders.

Sorokin's first NHL point came on 9 March 2023, when he received an assist after poke-checking a puck which led to a breakaway for Brock Nelson and the game winning goal in overtime against the Penguins. In the course of the 2022–23 season, Sorokin recorded a 31–22–7 with a .924 save percentage and a league-leading six shutouts. In recognition of his achievements, he was named a finalist for the Vezina Trophy, awarded to the league's best goaltender. Sorokin was widely credited as the main reason the Islanders qualified for the 2023 Stanley Cup playoffs. They were ultimately ousted by the Carolina Hurricanes in the first round.

On 1 July 2023, Sorokin signed an eight-year, $66 million contract extension with the Islanders.

On 1 March 2025, Sorokin became the 17th goaltender in NHL history to be credited with a goal when after making a save, Nashville Predators forward Steven Stamkos accidentally sent the puck into his own net. As Sorokin had been the last Islanders player to touch the puck, he was credited with the goal. On 6 April, in a game against the Washington Capitals, Sorokin allowed Alexander Ovechkin's 895th career NHL goal, which broke Wayne Gretzky's record of 894, making Ovechkin the all-time leading goal-scorer in NHL history. Sorokin also became the 183rd goaltender to give up a goal from Ovechkin.

On 6 December 2025, Sorokin recorded his 25th career shutout which tied Chico Resch for the most shutouts in Islanders history, in a 2–0 victory over the Tampa Bay Lightning. On 6 January 2026, Sorokin recorded his 26th career shutout, surpassing Resch on the Islanders' all-time shutouts list, in a 9–0 win over the New Jersey Devils.

== International play ==
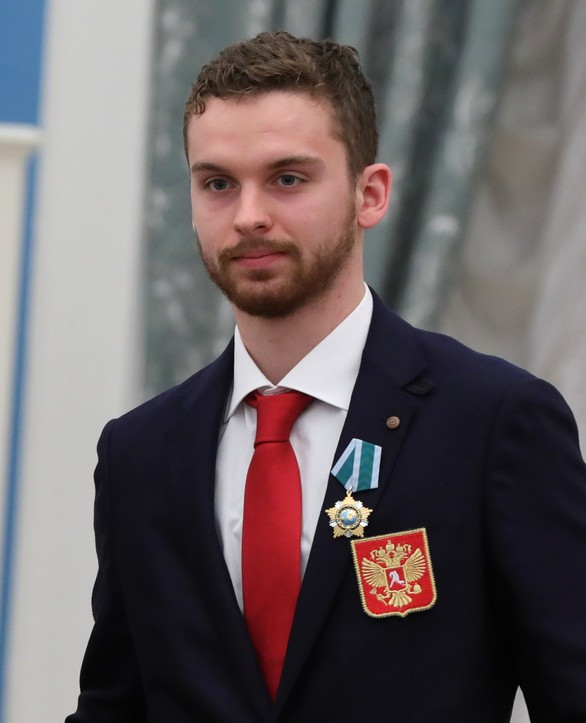

Medal record

Men's ice hockey

Representing Olympic Athletes from Russia

Olympic Games
| Gold medal – first place | 2018 Pyeongchang | |

Representing Russia

World Championships
| Bronze medal – third place | 2016 Russia | |
| Bronze medal – third place | 2017 Germany/France | |
| Bronze medal – third place | 2019 Slovakia | |

World Junior Championships
| Silver medal – second place | 2015 Canada | |

Sorokin was a member of the Olympic Athletes from Russia team at the 2018 Winter Olympics that won the gold medal.

== Career statistics ==
=== Regular season and playoffs ===
| | | | Regular season | | | | | | | | | Playoffs |
| Season | Team | League | GP | W | L | OT | MIN | GA | SO | GAA | SV% | GP | W | L | MIN | GA | SO | GAA | SV% |
|---|---|---|---|---|---|---|---|---|---|---|---|---|---|---|---|---|---|---|---|
| 2012–13 | Kuznetskie Medvedi | MHL | 27 | 11 | 8 | 3 | 1,423 | 61 | 1 | 2.57 | .914 | 3 | 0 | 2 | 159 | 9 | 0 | 3.40 | .898 |
| 2012–13 | Metallurg Novokuznetsk | KHL | 5 | 1 | 1 | 0 | 151 | 7 | 0 | 2.77 | .919 | — | — | — | — | — | — | — | — |
| 2013–14 | Kuznetskie Medvedi | MHL | 4 | 2 | 1 | 1 | 245 | 11 | 0 | 2.69 | .917 | 2 | 0 | 2 | 104 | 7 | 0 | 4.04 | .800 |
| 2013–14 | Metallurg Novokuznetsk | KHL | 27 | 5 | 12 | 0 | 1,346 | 65 | 0 | 2.90 | .911 | — | — | — | — | — | — | — | — |
| 2014–15 | Metallurg Novokuznetsk | KHL | 22 | 4 | 11 | 1 | 978 | 53 | 1 | 3.25 | .906 | — | — | — | — | — | — | — | — |
| 2014–15 | Kuznetskie Medvedi | MHL | 1 | 0 | 1 | 0 | 60 | 4 | 0 | 4.00 | .871 | — | — | — | — | — | — | — | — |
| 2014–15 | Krasnaya Armiya | MHL | 3 | 1 | 1 | 1 | 184 | 4 | 1 | 1.31 | .949 | 7 | 2 | 5 | 363 | 13 | 1 | 2.15 | .928 |
| 2014–15 | CSKA Moscow | KHL | 6 | 3 | 2 | 0 | 275 | 6 | 0 | 1.31 | .937 | — | — | — | — | — | — | — | — |
| 2015–16 | Zvezda Chekhov | VHL | 1 | 0 | 1 | 0 | 60 | 2 | 0 | 2.01 | .917 | — | — | — | — | — | — | — | — |
| 2015–16 | CSKA Moscow | KHL | 28 | 17 | 7 | 4 | 1,639 | 29 | 10 | 1.06 | .953 | 20 | 15 | 5 | 1,270 | 28 | 3 | 1.32 | .945 |
| 2016–17 | CSKA Moscow | KHL | 39 | 25 | 7 | 6 | 2,276 | 61 | 5 | 1.61 | .929 | 7 | 5 | 2 | 443 | 15 | 1 | 2.03 | .916 |
| 2017–18 | CSKA Moscow | KHL | 37 | 25 | 8 | 4 | 2,183 | 58 | 8 | 1.59 | .931 | 18 | 10 | 6 | 1,062 | 27 | 5 | 1.52 | .930 |
| 2018–19 | CSKA Moscow | KHL | 40 | 28 | 6 | 4 | 2,328 | 45 | 11 | 1.16 | .940 | 20 | 16 | 4 | 1,213 | 24 | 5 | 1.19 | .947 |
| 2019–20 | CSKA Moscow | KHL | 40 | 26 | 10 | 3 | 2,365 | 59 | 9 | 1.50 | .935 | 4 | 4 | 0 | 246 | 3 | 2 | 0.73 | .966 |
| 2020–21 | New York Islanders | NHL | 22 | 13 | 6 | 3 | 1,272 | 46 | 3 | 2.17 | .918 | 7 | 4 | 1 | 387 | 18 | 0 | 2.79 | .922 |
| 2021–22 | New York Islanders | NHL | 52 | 26 | 18 | 8 | 3,073 | 123 | 7 | 2.40 | .925 | — | — | — | — | — | — | — | — |
| 2022–23 | New York Islanders | NHL | 62 | 31 | 22 | 7 | 3,588 | 140 | 6 | 2.34 | .924 | 6 | 2 | 4 | 370 | 16 | 0 | 2.60 | .929 |
| 2023–24 | New York Islanders | NHL | 56 | 25 | 19 | 12 | 3,326 | 167 | 2 | 3.01 | .909 | 1 | 0 | 1 | 27 | 3 | 0 | 6.61 | .786 |
| 2024–25 | New York Islanders | NHL | 61 | 30 | 24 | 6 | 3,499 | 157 | 4 | 2.69 | .907 | — | — | — | — | — | — | — | — |
| 2025–26 | New York Islanders | NHL | 55 | 29 | 24 | 2 | 3,226 | 144 | 7 | 2.68 | .906 | — | — | — | — | — | — | — | — |
| KHL totals | | | 244 | 134 | 64 | 22 | 13,541 | 383 | 44 | 1.70 | .930 | 69 | 50 | 17 | 4,236 | 97 | 16 | 1.37 | .940 |
| NHL totals | | | 308 | 154 | 113 | 38 | 17,982 | 777 | 29 | 2.60 | .915 | 14 | 6 | 6 | 784 | 37 | 0 | 2.83 | .921 |

=== International ===
| Year | Team | Event | Result | GP | W | L | OT | MIN | GA | SO | GAA | SV% |
|---|---|---|---|---|---|---|---|---|---|---|---|---|
| 2015 | Russia | WJC | 2nd place, silver medalist(s) | 3 | 1 | 1 | 0 | 180 | 8 | 0 | 2.66 | .886 |
| 2016 | Russia | WC | 3rd place, bronze medalist(s) | 3 | 1 | 0 | 0 | 76 | 0 | 1 | 0.00 | 1.000 |
| 2017 | Russia | WC | 3rd place, bronze medalist(s) | 2 | 1 | 0 | 0 | 80 | 0 | 1 | 0.00 | 1.000 |
| 2018 | OAR | OG | 1st place, gold medalist(s) | 1 | 0 | 0 | 0 | 20 | 1 | 0 | 3.00 | .857 |
| 2018 | Russia | WC | 6th | — | — | — | — | — | — | — | — | — |
| 2019 | Russia | WC | 3rd place, bronze medalist(s) | — | — | — | — | — | — | — | — | — |
| Junior totals | | | | 3 | 1 | 1 | 0 | 180 | 8 | 0 | 2.66 | .886 |
| Senior totals | | | | 6 | 2 | 0 | 0 | 176 | 1 | 2 | 0.34 | .985 |

== Awards and honors ==
| Award | Year | Ref |
KHL
| All-Star Game | 2016, 2017, 2018, 2019, 2020 | |
| Goaltender of the Year | 2016 | |
| First All-Star Team | 2016 | |
| Gagarin Cup champion | 2019 | |
| Playoffs MVP | 2019 | |
NHL
| NHL All-Star Game | 2023 | |
| NHL Second All-Star Team | 2023 | |
