= Andrei Kuzmenko =

Russian ice hockey player (born 1996)

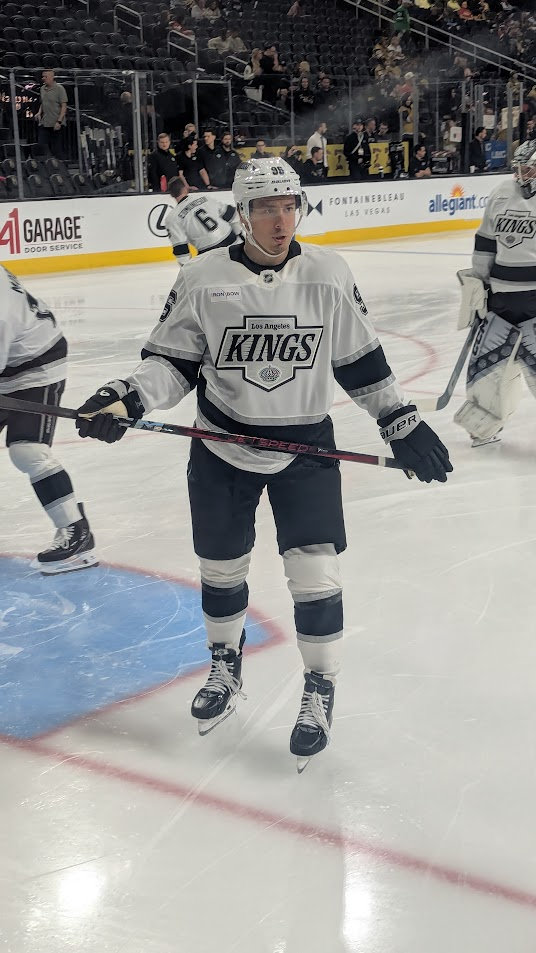
- Kuzmenko with the Los Angeles Kings in 2025
- Born: February 4, 1996 (age 30) Yakutsk, Russia
- Height: 5 ft 11 in (180 cm)
- Weight: 203 lb (92 kg; 14 st 7 lb)
- Position: Winger
- Shoots: Right
- NHL team Former teams: Pittsburgh Penguins; CSKA Moscow; SKA Saint Petersburg; Vancouver Canucks; Calgary Flames; Philadelphia Flyers; Los Angeles Kings
- National team: Russia
- NHL draft: Undrafted
- Playing career: 2014–present

Andrei Alexandrovich Kuzmenko (Russian: Андрей Александрович Кузменко; born February 4, 1996) is a Russian professional ice hockey player who is a winger for the Pittsburgh Penguins of the National Hockey League (NHL).

== Playing career ==
Kuzmenko made his Kontinental Hockey League debut playing with CSKA Moscow during the 2014–15 KHL season. In the 2017–18 season, Kuzmenko broke out as a 21-year-old establishing career bests of 13 goals and 25 points in 45 games with CSKA. In helping the club reach the Gagarin Cup finals, he produced four goals in 15 games.

Approaching the 2018–19 season, Kuzmenko was traded by CSKA to fellow contending club, SKA Saint Petersburg in exchange for Sergey Kalinin on August 8, 2018. In his fourth year with SKA in the 2021–22 season, Kuzmenko increased his offensive output to over a point-per-game leading SKA in scoring with 20 goals and 33 assists for 53 points in 45 regular season games. He led the team in the postseason, continuing his scoring pace with 14 points in as many contests before losing in the Conference finals to eventual champions and former club, CSKA Moscow.

As an undrafted free agent and having gained NHL interest, on June 20, 2022, Kuzmenko was signed to a one-year, entry-level contract with the Vancouver Canucks. He made his NHL debut on October 13, where he scored a goal in the eventual 5–3 loss to the Edmonton Oilers. He continued to produce steadily through the early parts of the season; on November 3, he recorded his first career NHL hat-trick in a four-point game, as the Canucks took an 8–5 victory over the Anaheim Ducks. By this time, Kuzmenko had tallied six goals and four assists for 10 points through 11 games. Establishing himself as one of the Canucks top offensive contributors, Kuzmenko as an impending free agent opted to remain with the Canucks in signing a two-year, $11 million contract extension on January 26, 2023.

On January 31, 2024, in the midst of a struggling sophomore season that saw him get healthy scratched multiple times, Kuzmenko, along with multiple draft picks and prospects, was traded to the Calgary Flames in exchange for forward Elias Lindholm.

On January 30, 2025, Kuzmenko, along with Jakob Pelletier and two draft picks, was traded by the Flames to the Philadelphia Flyers in exchange for Joel Farabee and Morgan Frost. On March 7, after playing seven games with the Flyers, Kuzmenko was traded to the Los Angeles Kings along with a seventh-round pick in the 2025 NHL entry draft in exchange for a third-round pick in the 2027 NHL entry draft, with 50% of his salary being retained by the Flyers.

On July 1, 2026, Kuzmenko signed a one-year, $5 million contract with the Pittsburgh Penguins.

== Personal life ==
Kuzmenko was born to Alexander Kuzmenko, an ice hockey coach who was killed in a bear attack during a fishing trip along the Krasnaya River in Siberia in 2026.

== Career statistics ==
=== Regular season and playoffs ===
| | | | Regular season | | | | | Playoffs |
| Season | Team | League | GP | G | A | Pts | PIM | GP | G | A | Pts | PIM |
|---|---|---|---|---|---|---|---|---|---|---|---|---|
| 2012–13 | Krasnaya Armiya | MHL | 49 | 5 | 7 | 12 | 8 | — | — | — | — | — |
| 2013–14 | Krasnaya Armiya | MHL | 36 | 13 | 18 | 31 | 2 | 18 | 3 | 3 | 6 | 0 |
| 2014–15 | Krasnaya Armiya | MHL | 37 | 20 | 21 | 41 | 20 | 13 | 4 | 10 | 14 | 0 |
| 2014–15 | CSKA Moscow | KHL | 12 | 1 | 2 | 3 | 0 | 1 | 0 | 0 | 0 | 0 |
| 2015–16 | CSKA Moscow | KHL | 15 | 1 | 2 | 3 | 0 | — | — | — | — | — |
| 2015–16 | Zvezda Chekhov | VHL | 17 | 2 | 4 | 6 | 2 | — | — | — | — | — |
| 2015–16 | Krasnaya Armiya | MHL | 5 | 1 | 3 | 4 | 0 | 7 | 8 | 1 | 9 | 2 |
| 2016–17 | CSKA Moscow | KHL | 34 | 6 | 9 | 15 | 6 | 1 | 0 | 0 | 0 | 2 |
| 2016–17 | Zvezda Chekhov | VHL | 23 | 11 | 17 | 28 | 4 | 5 | 1 | 3 | 4 | 0 |
| 2016–17 | Krasnaya Armiya | MHL | 3 | 3 | 0 | 3 | 0 | 13 | 11 | 13 | 24 | 6 |
| 2017–18 | CSKA Moscow | KHL | 45 | 13 | 12 | 25 | 12 | 15 | 4 | 1 | 5 | 6 |
| 2017–18 | Zvezda Chekhov | VHL | 7 | 5 | 5 | 10 | 2 | — | — | — | — | — |
| 2018–19 | SKA Saint Petersburg | KHL | 58 | 12 | 19 | 31 | 20 | 9 | 0 | 0 | 0 | 4 |
| 2019–20 | SKA Saint Petersburg | KHL | 49 | 14 | 19 | 33 | 6 | 4 | 3 | 1 | 4 | 0 |
| 2020–21 | SKA Saint Petersburg | KHL | 57 | 18 | 19 | 37 | 14 | 15 | 4 | 2 | 6 | 4 |
| 2021–22 | SKA Saint Petersburg | KHL | 45 | 20 | 33 | 53 | 10 | 16 | 7 | 7 | 14 | 12 |
| 2022–23 | Vancouver Canucks | NHL | 81 | 39 | 35 | 74 | 8 | — | — | — | — | — |
| 2023–24 | Vancouver Canucks | NHL | 43 | 8 | 13 | 21 | 6 | — | — | — | — | — |
| 2023–24 | Calgary Flames | NHL | 29 | 14 | 11 | 25 | 6 | — | — | — | — | — |
| 2024–25 | Calgary Flames | NHL | 37 | 4 | 11 | 15 | 12 | — | — | — | — | — |
| 2024–25 | Philadelphia Flyers | NHL | 7 | 2 | 3 | 5 | 0 | — | — | — | — | — |
| 2024–25 | Los Angeles Kings | NHL | 22 | 5 | 12 | 17 | 2 | 6 | 3 | 3 | 6 | 4 |
| 2025–26 | Los Angeles Kings | NHL | 52 | 13 | 12 | 25 | 16 | 1 | 0 | 0 | 0 | 0 |
| KHL totals | | | 315 | 85 | 115 | 200 | 68 | 61 | 18 | 11 | 29 | 28 |
| NHL totals | | | 271 | 85 | 97 | 182 | 50 | 7 | 3 | 3 | 6 | 4 |

=== International ===
| Year | Team | Event | Result | GP | G | A | Pts | PIM |
|---|---|---|---|---|---|---|---|---|
| 2013 | Russia | U17 | 2nd place, silver medalist(s) | 6 | 1 | 0 | 1 | 2 |
| 2016 | Russia | WJC | 2nd place, silver medalist(s) | 7 | 0 | 0 | 0 | 2 |
| 2021 | ROC | WC | 5th | 2 | 1 | 1 | 2 | 0 |
| Junior totals | | | | 13 | 1 | 0 | 1 | 4 |
| Senior totals | | | | 2 | 1 | 1 | 2 | 0 |
