= Mikhail Varnakov (ice hockey, born 1985) =

Russian ice hockey player

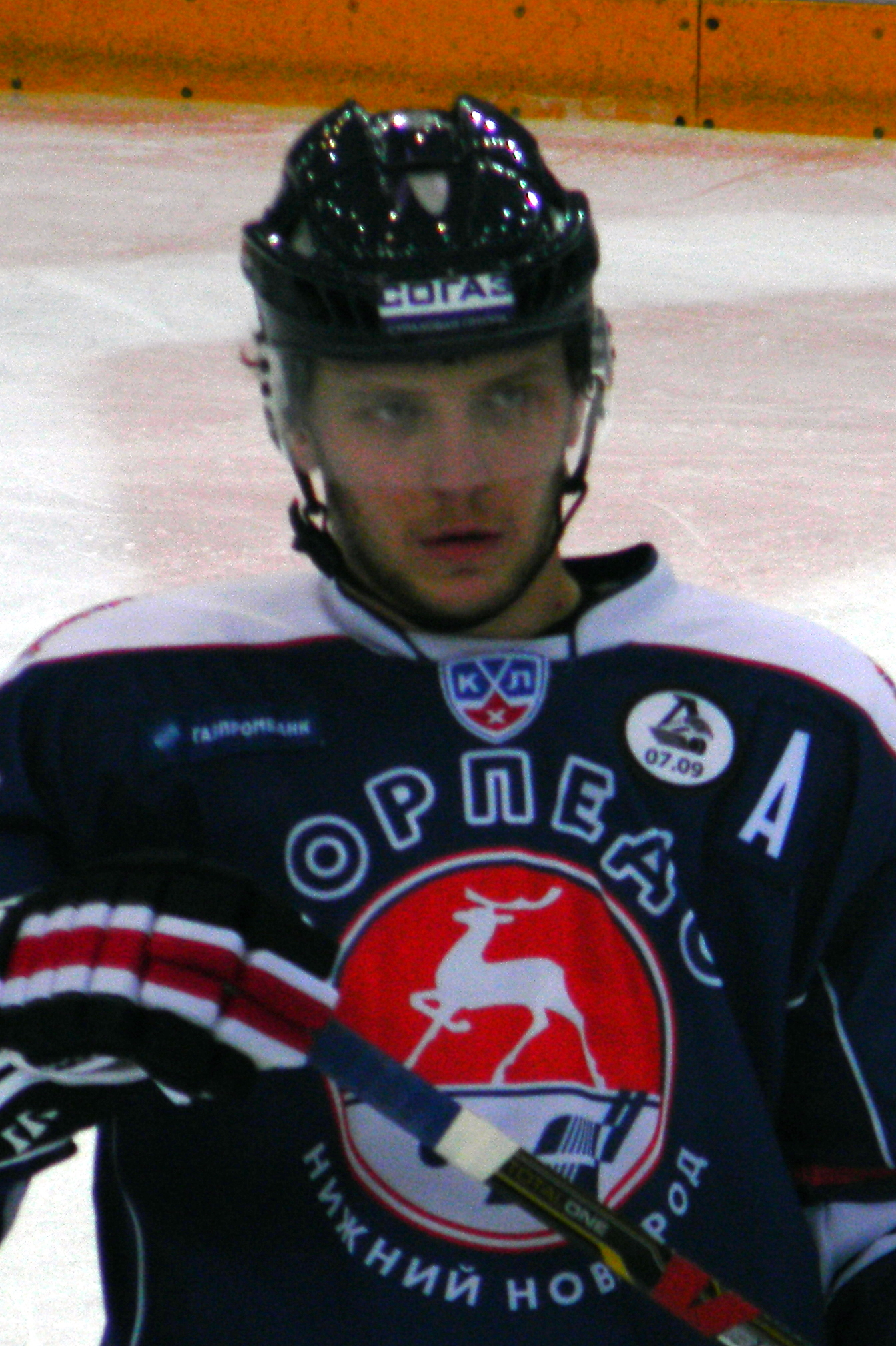
- Born: March 1, 1985 (age 41) Nizhny Novgorod, Russian SFSR
- Height: 5 ft 10 in (178 cm)
- Weight: 214 lb (97 kg; 15 st 4 lb)
- Position: Right wing
- Shoots: Left
- KHL team Former teams: Free agent Torpedo Nizhny Novgorod; SKA Saint Petersburg; Ak Bars Kazan; Dynamo Moscow; Lokomotiv Yaroslavl
- Playing career: 2003–present

Mikhail Varnakov (born March 1, 1985) is a Russian professional ice hockey forward who is currently an unrestricted free agent. He formerly played in the Kontinental Hockey League (KHL).

== Playing career ==
Varnakov previously played four seasons with Ak Bars Kazan in the Kontinental Hockey League (KHL) before leaving as a free agent to sign a one-year deal with HC Dynamo Moscow on May 12, 2017.

After five seasons away from original club, Torpedo Nizhny Novgorod, Varnakov returned as a free agent on May 31, 2018. Varnakov was soon appointed as team captain for Torpedo prior to the 2018–19 season.
