= Kirill Kaprizov =

Russian ice hockey player (born 1997)

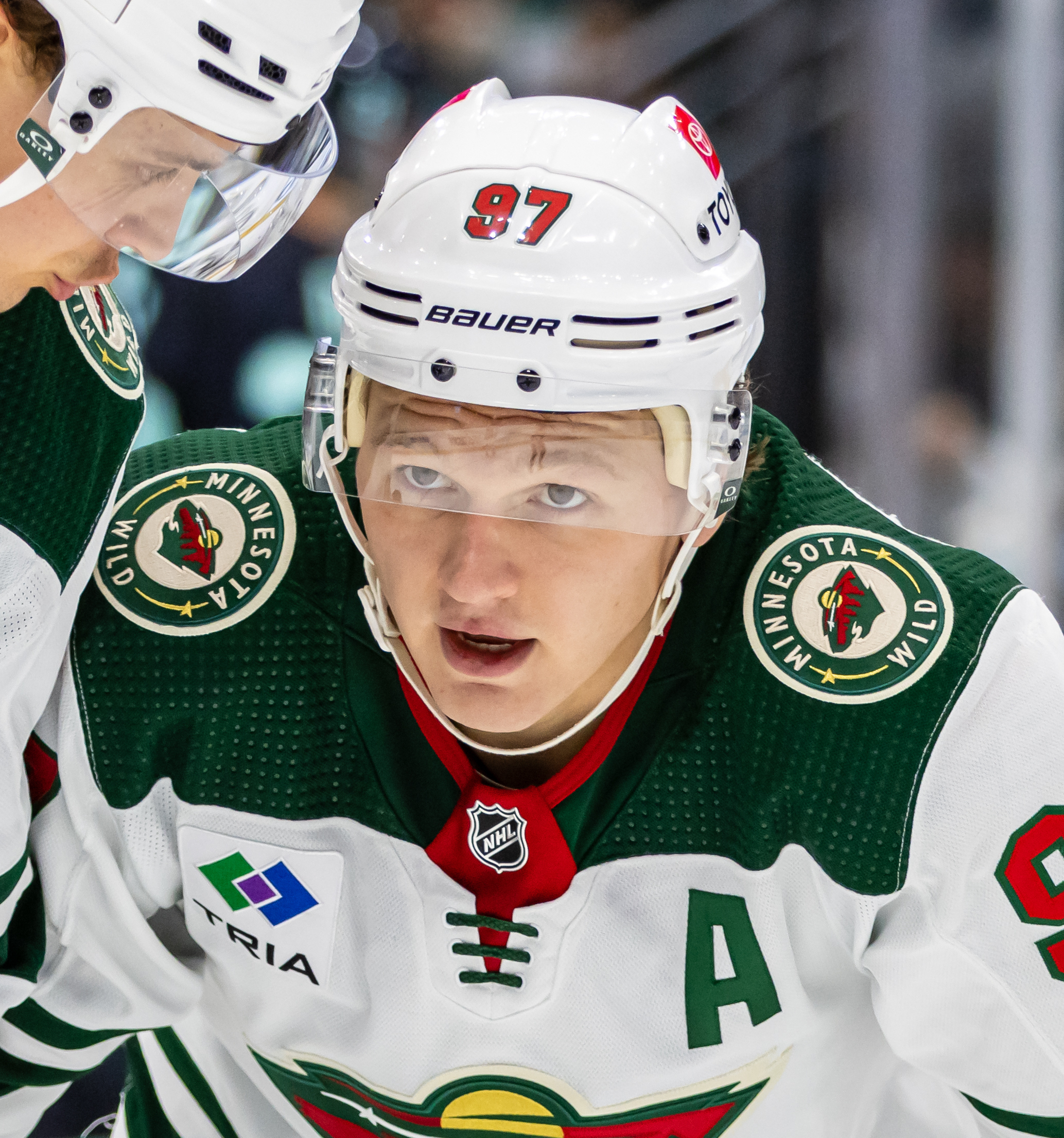
- Kaprizov with the Minnesota Wild in 2023
- Born: 26 April 1997 (age 29) Novokuznetsk, Russia
- Height: 5 ft 10 in (178 cm)
- Weight: 202 lb (92 kg; 14 st 6 lb)
- Position: Left wing
- Shoots: Left
- NHL team Former teams: Minnesota Wild; Metallurg Novokuznetsk; Salavat Yulaev Ufa; CSKA Moscow
- National team: Russia
- NHL draft: 135th overall, 2015; Minnesota Wild
- Playing career: 2014–present

Kirill Olegovich Kaprizov (Russian: Кирилл Олегович Капризов; born 26 April 1997) is a Russian professional ice hockey player who is a left winger and alternate captain for the Minnesota Wild of the National Hockey League (NHL). Before joining the Wild, Kaprizov played for Metallurg Novokuznetsk, Salavat Yulaev Ufa and CSKA Moscow in the Kontinental Hockey League (KHL). Kaprizov won the Calder Memorial Trophy as NHL rookie of the year in 2021, becoming the first Wild player to win the award. Fans have nicknamed him "Kirill the Thrill".

== Early life ==
Kaprizov grew up in a small village about 60 miles (97 km) outside Novokuznetsk. He began playing hockey at age four, traveling daily between his village and downtown Novokuznetsk for practice, before moving to the city to further his hockey career. Kaprizov played in the Metallurg Novokuznetsk hockey school as a child, progressing to the Kuznetskie Medvedi junior team before beginning his professional career with the senior team in 2014.

== Playing career ==
=== KHL career (2014–2020) ===
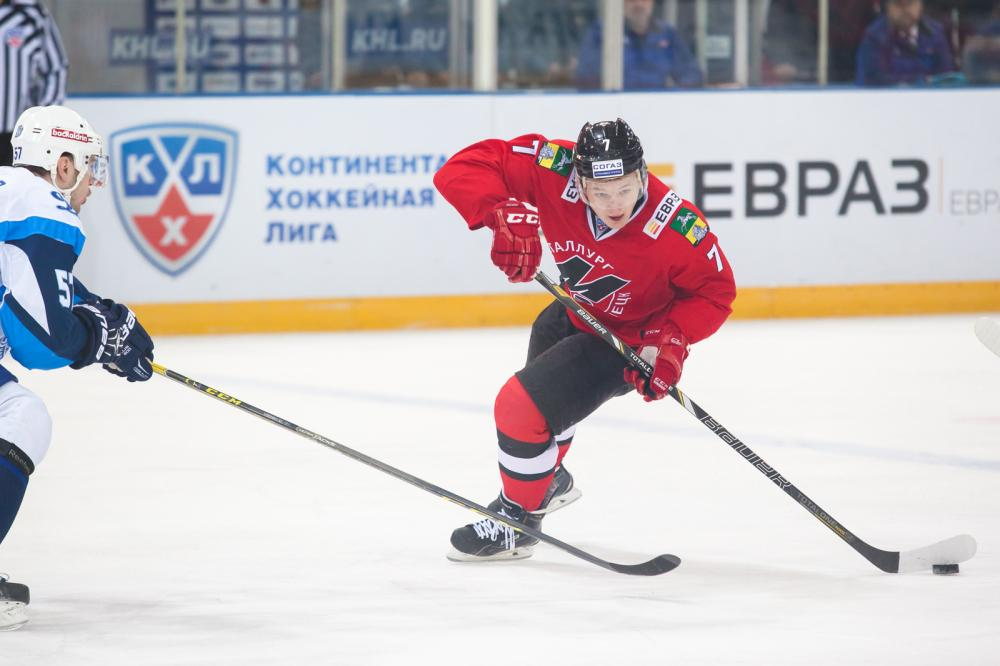
Kaprizov playing for Metallurg Novokuznetsk against Dinamo Minsk in 2015

Kaprizov made his Kontinental Hockey League (KHL) debut playing with his hometown club, Metallurg Novokuznetsk, during the 2014–15 KHL season, after being drafted first overall in the 2014 KHL Junior Draft. On 21 August 2015, Kaprizov was signed to a three-year contract extension to remain with Metallurg Novokuznetsk.

On 2 May 2016, he was traded to Salavat Yulaev Ufa. He played one season for Ufa, totaling 42 points in 49 games before being traded to CSKA Moscow in 2017 in exchange for monetary compensation. He played in the 2018 and 2019 Gagarin Cup finals, winning the latter.

During his final season under contract with CSKA in 2019–20, Kaprizov set career-high marks with 33 goals (ranked 1 in the KHL), 29 assists, and 62 points (ranked 3 in the KHL) and tied his career best in games-played with 57. He registered his 100th career goal on 15 October 2019, becoming the youngest player in KHL history to do so, at 22 years, 172 days old. In the postseason, Kaprizov posted four points in CSKA's first-round series sweep against Torpedo Nizhny Novgorod before the KHL cancelled its season due to the COVID-19 pandemic. However, he and the rest of CSKA team were awarded the title of KHL champions based on regular standings. During his KHL career, Kaprizov was selected to five KHL All-Star Games in each year from 2016 to 2020.

=== NHL (2020–present) ===
Kaprizov was drafted by the Minnesota Wild of the National Hockey League in the fifth round of the 2015 NHL entry draft, 135th overall. According to Wild owner Craig Leipold, the Wild's scouting department only became aware of Kaprizov when smog from the 2014 California wildfires delayed their flight home from a scouting trip in Russia. This allowed them to attend one of Kaprizov's games for Metallurg Novokuznetsk. Upon being drafted by the Wild, Kaprizov learned about Minnesota from his Novokuznetsk teammate and Minnesota native Ryan Stoa. He has credited Stoa with helping him learn English to prepare for his NHL career.

On 13 July 2020, Kaprizov signed a two-year, entry-level deal with the Minnesota Wild. The contract included the 2019–20 season, which was impacted by the COVID-19 pandemic, but he did not play his first game until the 2020–21 season. Kaprizov made his NHL debut on 14 January 2021 against the Los Angeles Kings. He tallied three points, including the game-winning goal in overtime, in a 4–3 victory for the Wild. In this game, he became the first player in NHL history to score three points and an overtime goal in his debut, and became the third player in NHL history to score an overtime goal in his debut. He was subsequently named NHL First Star of the Week for the week ending 17 January. Kaprizov scored his first NHL hat trick on 12 March, in a 4–0 victory over the Arizona Coyotes. On 19 April, Kaprizov scored his 37th point, breaking the Wild's franchise record for points by a rookie, which was previously held by Marián Gáborík (in 2000–01). Despite the shortened 2020–21 NHL season as a result of the COVID-19 pandemic, Kaprizov set Wild franchise records for goals and points by a rookie, with 27 goals and 51 points. He was awarded the Calder Memorial Trophy as rookie of the year, becoming the first player in Wild franchise history to receive the honour. He received 99 out of 100 first place votes, the highest percentage since Teemu Selänne in 1993.

On 21 September 2021, Kaprizov signed a five-year, $45 million contract with the Wild. The contract came after months of negotiations in which Kaprizov was reported to be willing to return to CSKA Moscow if did not come to terms with the Wild. Regarding these reports, Kaprizov said there was "no chance" he would have returned to the KHL. Upon signing the contract, Kaprizov became the highest-paid sophomore player in NHL history. After starting the season with 40 points in 32 games, Kaprizov was selected for his first NHL All-Star Game. At All-Star weekend, he participated in the Breakaway Challenge in the NHL All-Star Skills Competition with a tribute to Alexander Ovechkin, wearing Ovechkin's jersey and performing his famed "hot stick" celebration. On 2 April 2022, Kaprizov broke Gáborík's franchise record for points in a season, with 84. Later that month, he went on to break Gáborík's franchise record for goals in a season, with 43. By the season's end, Kaprizov had set Wild franchise records in each of the major scoring categories with 47 goals, 61 assists, and 108 points.

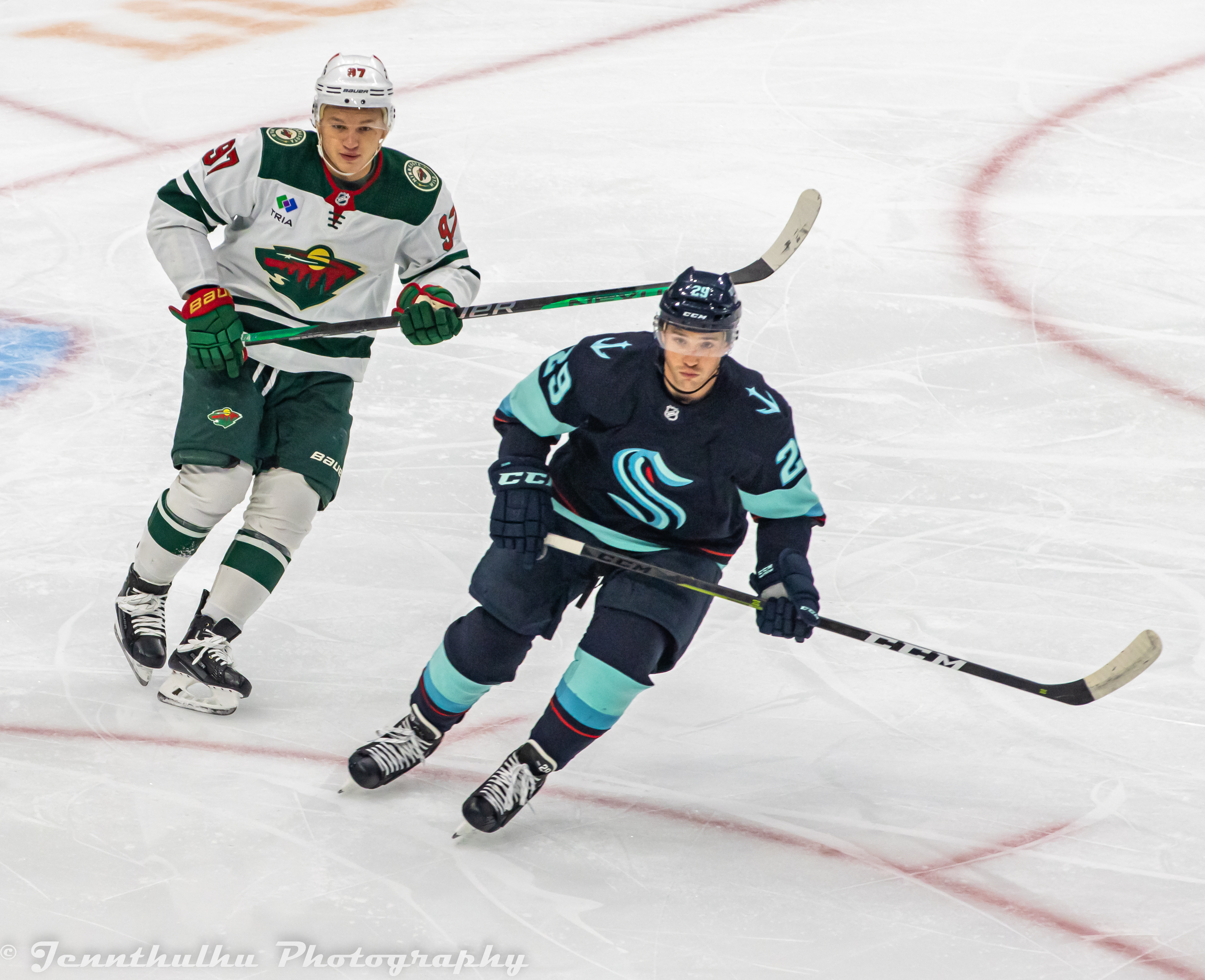
Kaprizov and Vince Dunn during a game in 2023

During the 2022 off-season, Kaprizov returned to Russia to visit family, despite Wild general manager Bill Guerin encouraging him to stay in Minnesota due to the ongoing Russo-Ukrainian war. In July 2022, multiple Russian media outlets reported that Kaprizov was wanted in Russia for allegedly purchasing a fraudulent military identity card in 2017 to evade the mandatory military service required of Russian men aged 18 to 27. The reports occurred days after Philadelphia Flyers prospect Ivan Fedotov was arrested in Russia for purchasing a military ID in 2017. Kaprizov and Fedotov were teammates on Salavat Yulaev Ufa during this time. Responding to these reports, Kaprizov's father denied the allegations and stated that Kaprizov was a student at the Russian Presidential Academy of National Economy and Public Administration, and thus his military obligations were delayed as a result of his studies. Despite the reports being largely refuted by Western media, Kaprizov unsuccessfully attempted to go to the United States twice in the days following, first via Dubai and then via the Caribbean. He returned to Russia after these attempts. On 1 August, Kaprizov successfully entered the United States via Turkey, arriving in New York City before returning to Minnesota the following day.

Unlike the 2021–22 season in which he did not score until the 9th game of the season, Kaprizov began the 2022–23 season with 8 goals in the Wild's first 10 games. While facing the Los Angeles Kings on November 9, Kaprizov received a match penalty for cross-checking Kings defenceman Drew Doughty in the face; Kaprizov was ejected as a result of the match penalty and fined $5,000 by the NHL. After beginning the season with 22 goals and 47 points in 37 games, Kaprizov was named to his second consecutive All-Star Game. Kaprizov suffered a lower-body injury after Winnipeg Jets defenceman Logan Stanley fell on him during a game on March 8. The injury forced Kaprizov to miss 13 games in March and April. Despite the injury limiting him to 67 games played, Kaprizov reached 40 goals for the second consecutive season, becoming the first player in Wild history with multiple 40 goal seasons. In a first-round playoff series against the Dallas Stars, Kaprizov was largely held in check by the Stars' defence, and managed to only score one point (a goal) as Dallas won the series in six games.

Following the 2024 NHL All-Star Game break, Kaprizov was joined on the Wild's top line by Joel Eriksson Ek and Matt Boldy. By 15 February, Kaprizov and Eriksson Ek had added five points over three games and the trio had combined for 17 points. On 19 February 2024, Kaprizov and Eriksson Ek scored hat tricks in the third period to lift the Wild 10–7 over the Vancouver Canucks. As a result of their hat-tricks, they helped set a new team record for most goals in a game and matched the franchise record for points in a game.

In September 2025, Kaprizov signed an eight-year, $136 million deal with the Wild, the richest contract in NHL history at the time, after he initially turned down a $128 million offer from the Wild. During a 1 March 2026 game against the St. Louis Blues, Kaprizov tied Gáborík's franchise record for goals at 219.

During the 2026 Stanley Cup playoffs, he set the franchise record for playoff goals when he scored during game 5 of the Wild's first-round series against the Dallas Stars, breaking Zach Parise's record of 16 goals.

== International play ==
Medal record

Men's ice hockey

Representing Olympic Athletes from Russia

Winter Olympics
Gold medal – first place	2018 Pyeongchang	

Representing Russia

World Championships
Bronze medal – third place	2019 Slovakia	

World Junior Championships
Silver medal – second place	2016 Helsinki	
Bronze medal – third place	2017 Canada	

Kaprizov has played for Russian national teams in the World U18 Championships, World Junior Championships, World Championships, and the Winter Olympics.

At the 2017 World Junior Championships, Kaprizov tied for leading scorer with nine goals and three assists in 12 games. In this tournament, Russia won bronze, beating Sweden in the third place game.

He was the youngest player on the gold medal-winning Olympic Athletes from Russia team at the 2018 Winter Olympics. Kaprizov scored the golden goal in overtime of the final match against Germany, winning the first gold medal for the Russian ice hockey team since 1992. His five goals throughout the Olympics finished tied for the tournament lead.

In 2019, he won bronze at the 2019 World Championship.

== Personal life ==
Kaprizov is the godfather and namesake of his CSKA Moscow teammate Nikita Nesterov's son, Kirill Nesterov.

Kaprizov is an Orthodox Christian. In his free time, he enjoys playing video games, including Counter-Strike and Dota. When back in Novokuznetsk, he enjoys fishing and playing football.

== Career statistics ==
=== Regular season and playoffs ===
			Regular season					Playoffs
Season	Team	League	GP	G	A	Pts	PIM	GP	G	A	Pts	PIM
2013–14	Kuznetskie Medvedi	MHL	52	18	16	34	30	8	1	2	3	2
2014–15	Metallurg Novokuznetsk	KHL	31	4	4	8	6	—	—	—	—	—
2014–15	Kuznetskie Medvedi	MHL	3	0	2	2	2	3	0	0	0	2
2015–16	Metallurg Novokuznetsk	KHL	53	11	16	27	10	—	—	—	—	—
2015–16	Kuznetski Medvedi	MHL	4	7	3	10	0	—	—	—	—	—
2016–17	Salavat Yulaev Ufa	KHL	49	20	22	42	66	5	3	0	3	0
2017–18	CSKA Moscow	KHL	46	15	25	40	14	19	2	8	10	4
2018–19	CSKA Moscow	KHL	57	30	21	51	16	19	4	10	14	6
2019–20	CSKA Moscow	KHL	57	33	29	62	10	4	2	2	4	2
2020–21	Minnesota Wild	NHL	55	27	24	51	16	7	2	1	3	4
2021–22	Minnesota Wild	NHL	81	47	61	108	34	6	7	1	8	2
2022–23	Minnesota Wild	NHL	67	40	35	75	45	6	1	0	1	12
2023–24	Minnesota Wild	NHL	75	46	50	96	36	—	—	—	—	—
2024–25	Minnesota Wild	NHL	41	25	31	56	16	6	5	4	9	4
2025–26	Minnesota Wild	NHL	78	45	44	89	28	11	4	11	15	2
KHL totals			293	113	117	230	122	47	11	20	31	12
NHL totals			397	230	245	475	175	36	19	17	36	24

=== International ===
Year	Team	Event	Result	GP	G	A	Pts	PIM
2015	Russia	WJC18	5th	4	1	3	4	2
2015	Russia	IH18	5th	4	5	2	7	0
2016	Russia	WJC	2nd place, silver medalist(s)	7	1	2	3	2
2017	Russia	WJC	3rd place, bronze medalist(s)	7	9	3	12	2
2018	OAR	OG	1st place, gold medalist(s)	6	5	4	9	2
2018	Russia	WC	6th	8	6	2	8	2
2019	Russia	WC	3rd place, bronze medalist(s)	9	2	0	2	2
Junior totals				22	16	10	26	6
Senior totals				23	13	6	19	6

== Awards and honours ==
Award	Year	Ref
KHL
All-Star Game	2016, 2017, 2018, 2019, 2020	
Gagarin Cup champion	2019	
Golden Stick (MVP)	2019	
Best Sniper	2019, 2020	
NHL
Calder Memorial Trophy	2021	
NHL All-Rookie Team	2021	
NHL All-Star Game	2022, 2023, 2024	

=== Minnesota Wild records ===
- Most goals by a rookie – 27 (2020–21)
- Most points by a rookie – 51 (2020–21)
- Most points in a season – 108 (2021–22)
- Most goals in a season – 47 (2021–22)
- Most power play goals in a season – 18 (2023–24)
- Most assists in a season – 61 (2021–22)
- Most points in a game – 6 (19 February 2024)
- Consecutive games with a goal – 7 (23 November – 10 December 2022)
- Consecutive games with an assist – 9 (11 November – 1 December 2022)
- Most goals in a month – 13 (March 2022)
- Most goals in a single playoff series – 8 (2022)

Awards and achievements
Preceded by Cale Makar	Winner of the Calder Trophy; 2021	Succeeded by Moritz Seider
