= Mikhail Grigorenko =

Russian ice hockey player (born 1994)

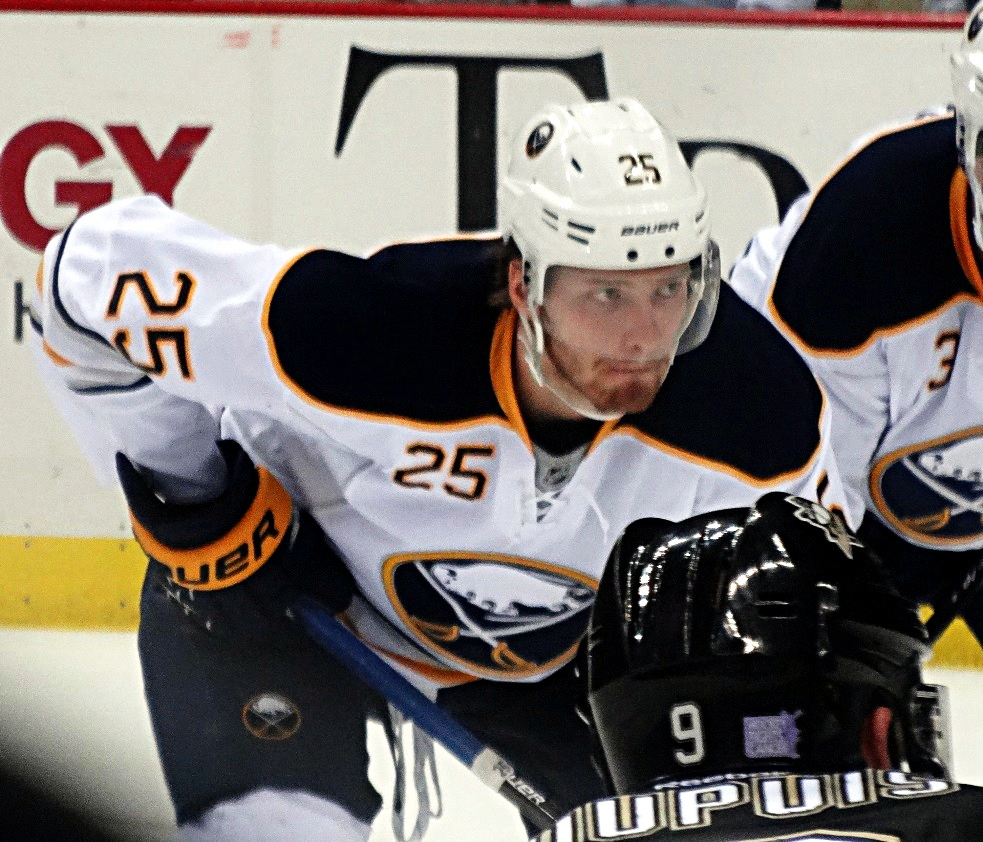
- Grigorenko with the Buffalo Sabres in 2013
- Born: 16 May 1994 (age 32) Khabarovsk, Khabarovsk Krai, Russia
- Height: 6 ft 3 in (191 cm)
- Weight: 201 lb (91 kg; 14 st 5 lb)
- Position: Centre
- Shoots: Left
- KHL team Former teams: Traktor Chelyabinsk; Buffalo Sabres; Colorado Avalanche; CSKA Moscow; Columbus Blue Jackets; SKA Saint Petersburg
- National team: Russia
- NHL draft: 12th overall, 2012; Buffalo Sabres
- Playing career: 2013–present

Mikhail Olegovich Grigorenko (Russian: Михаи́л Оле́гович Григоре́нко; born 16 May 1994) is a Russian professional ice hockey forward for Traktor Chelyabinsk of the Kontinental Hockey League (KHL).

Born and raised in Russia, Grigorenko moved to North America in 2011 and joined the Quebec Remparts of the Quebec Major Junior Hockey League (QMJHL). After one season in Quebec, he was selected in the first round, 12th overall, in the 2012 NHL entry draft by the Buffalo Sabres. HC CSKA Moscow also selected Grigorenko in the first round, eighth overall, of the 2011 KHL Junior Draft. He has previously played in the NHL with the Sabres and the Colorado Avalanche.

== Playing career ==
=== Junior ===
Grigorenko first played competitive junior hockey in his native Russia with Krasnaya Armiya in the MHL, the junior team to CSKA Moscow. In the 2010–11 season, as a 16-year-old, Grigorenko impressively showed an early offensive touch, contributing 17 goals and 35 points in 43 games.

In June 2011, Grigorenko was selected second overall in the CHL Import Draft by the Quebec Remparts of the Quebec Major Junior Hockey League (QMJHL). Hockey Hall of Famer Patrick Roy, the owner, general manager and head coach of the Remparts, liked Grigorenko so much he traded up in the Import Draft to select him.

Grigorenko played 59 games with the Remparts during the 2011–12 season, his first in North America, and scored 40 goals and 45 assists for 85 points. He led all rookie players in the QMJHL in goals and points and was second for assists to capture the Michel Bergeron Trophy. He also finished fifth overall in goals scored and was tied for eighth overall for points while playing the fewest games of any player who was in the top ten in points. Earning selection to the All-Rookie and First All-Star Teams on 20 March 2012, Grigorenko was also nominated and chosen as the top professional prospect to play in the QMJHL during 2011–12 with the Mike Bossy Trophy.

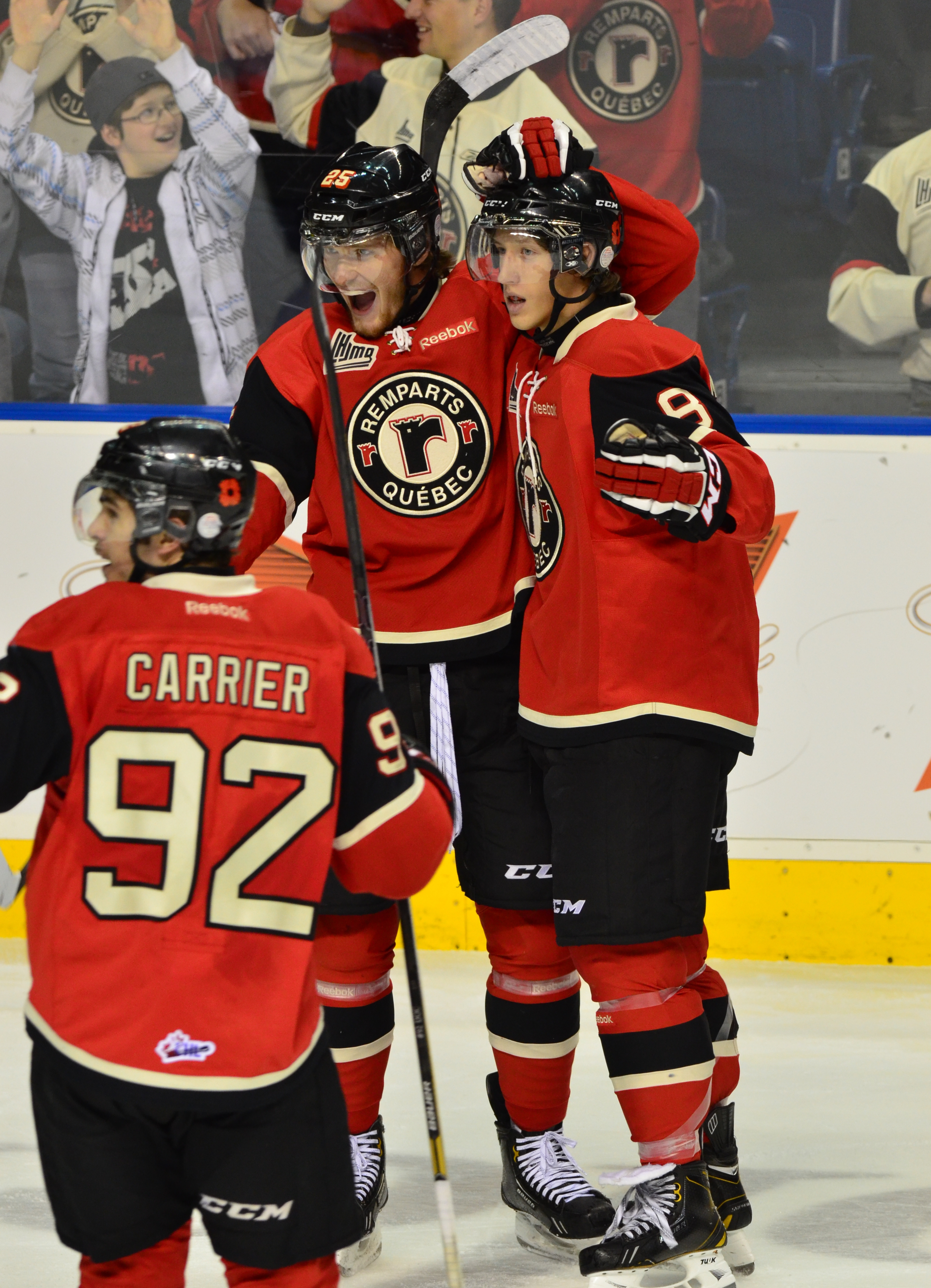
Mikhail Grigorenko (25) in the center celebrating a goal with Quebec Remparts' teammates

As a top-rated forward prospect for the 2012 NHL entry draft, Grigorenko was selected in the first round, 12th overall, by the Buffalo Sabres. On 18 July 2012, he signed a three-year, entry-level contract with the Sabres. With the 2012–13 NHL lockout delaying the beginning of the NHL season, Grigorenko was reassigned to start the season back with the Remparts, where he played 32 games and recorded 50 points during the season before the lockout ending in January. At the time, he was leading the Remparts and was fifth in the QMJHL with 29 goals, and his 50 points were second on the team.

=== Professional ===
==== Buffalo Sabres ====
When the lockout ended in January, Grigorenko was invited to the Sabres' training camp, where he made the roster for the start of the season. After playing five games with the Sabres, the team opted to keep Grigorenko for the remainder of the season rather than send him back to the Remparts; had they done so, the season would not have counted as one year expired on his entry-level contract. On 29 January, Grigorenko scored his first career NHL goal, against James Reimer of the Toronto Maple Leafs, becoming the fifth-youngest Sabre to score in franchise history.

After 22 games with the Sabres, where he recorded one goal and four assists, Grigorenko was reassigned to the Remparts on 15 March 2013. Grigorenko went on to lead the Remparts in playoff scoring with 14 points in 11 games before being recalled by the Sabres on 16 April.

Grigorenko began the 2013–14 season with the Sabres. However, with the Sabres cleaning out the front office and coaching staff, and with an imperative to rely less on the youth from new head coach Ted Nolan, he was returned to junior after sporadically appearing in just 18 games on 11 January 2014. He reported to the Remparts several days later after initially refusing to do so. In his final junior season with the Remparts, Grigorenko dominated in his 23 appearances, collecting 15 goals and 39 points in the regular season. With an early post-season exit, Grigorenko was then assigned to Buffalo's American Hockey League (AHL) affiliate, the Rochester Americans, to play out the remainder of the year.

In his first full professional year, Grigorenko split the 2014–15 season between the Sabres and Rochester. Beginning the year with the Sabres, Grigorenko would be shuffled between the NHL and AHL on five occasions. In 43 games with the Americans, Grigorenko continued to show his offensive promise in posting 14 goals and 36 points. He returned to complete the season with the Sabres, scoring 6 points in 25 games.

==== Colorado Avalanche ====
On 26 June 2015, at the 2015 NHL entry draft, as an impending restricted free agent, Grigorenko was traded by the Sabres in a package that included Nikita Zadorov, J. T. Compher and the 31st pick in the draft to the Colorado Avalanche in exchange for Ryan O'Reilly and Jamie McGinn. Grigorenko then signed to an initial one-year, one-way contract with the Avalanche on 17 July.

Grigorenko's arrival in Colorado marked a reunion with former junior coach and then head coach of the Avalanche, Patrick Roy. He made the Avalanche roster after his first training camp, opening the 2015–16 season. After being a healthy scratch for three games, Grigorenko made his Avalanche debut centering the fourth line, collecting an assist on a Jack Skille goal in a 3–0 victory over the Anaheim Ducks on 16 October 2015. He continued with fourth-line duties until injury gave him an opportunity in a top-six scoring role. Grigorenko responded by recording his first goal for the Avalanche in a three-point night against the Montreal Canadiens on 14 November 2017. He compiled seven points in six contests on an East Coast road trip before he was returned to the fourth line. Grigorenko later secured a role on a scoring line through the midpoint of the year to play his first full season in the NHL, recording a career-high six goals and 27 points in 74 games.

In the off-season, as a restricted free agent, Grigorenko originally filed for arbitration. However, ahead of his scheduled meeting, he agreed to a one-year, $1.3 million contract with the Avalanche on 21 July 2016. With the surprise departure of head coach Patrick Roy, Grigorenko initially impressed incoming head coach Jared Bednar, leading the Avalanche in pre-season scoring. However, in the 2016–17 season, he was unable to maintain his offensive production as a consistent scoring threat. While lacking the physicality for a lower-depth role, Grigorenko (mainly playing on the wing) collected ten goals for 23 points in 75 games for the cellar-dwelling Avalanche.

On 26 June 2017, Grigorenko was not tendered a qualifying contract by the Avalanche and became an unrestricted free agent.

==== CSKA Moscow ====
As a free agent, Grigorenko garnered NHL interest however opted to return to Russia in agreeing to a three-year contract with his original junior club and a KHL powerhouse, CSKA Moscow of the Kontinental Hockey League (KHL), on 3 July 2017.

In the second year of his contract with CSKA in the 2018–19 season, Grigorenko improved upon his previous seasons' totals, in leading the club in scoring with 17 goals and 35 assists for 52 points in 55 regular season games. In the playoffs, Grigorenko continued to lead CSKA's offense, helping return the club to the Gagarin Cup finals, selected as the finals best forward in helping CSKA claim their first Championship in the KHL by scoring 6 points in the four-game series sweep against Avangard Omsk. He scored in three games and recorded the first-ever Gagarin Cup finals hat-trick (in the first game of the series, including the game-winning goal).

==== Columbus Blue Jackets ====
On 20 April 2020, Grigorenko planned a return to the NHL, signing a one-year, $1.2 million contract with the Columbus Blue Jackets. However, the NHL rejected the contract, stating that it must be refiled on the first day of free agency for the 2020–21 season. On 13 July 2020, Grigorenko was officially signed by the Blue Jackets. After attending the Blue Jackets training camp, Grigorenko made the opening night roster, making his debut and playing his first NHL game in nearly four years in a 3-1 defeat to the Nashville Predators on 14 January 2021. Deployed in scoring line role, Grigorenko struggled to translate his offensive game and was reduced to a healthy scratch mid-way through the season. He later returned to the lineup to finish with four goals and 12 points through 32 regular season games as the Blue Jackets missed the playoffs.

==== Return to CSKA ====
Grigorenko opted to return to Russia as an impending free agent, signing a three-year contract with his former club, CSKA Moscow of the KHL, on 3 July 2021. During his second tenure with CSKA, Grigorenko helped the club return to the top of the KHL, leading the club offensively and claiming the Gagarin Cup in each of his first two seasons in 2021–22 and 2022–23.

==== SKA Saint Petersburg ====
Having completed his sixth overall season with CSKA in 2023–24, Grigorenko left the club as a free agent and was signed by rival club SKA Saint Petersburg to a lucrative four-year contract on 24 May 2024. In the following 2024–25 season, Grigorenko matched his previous season totals in posting 45 points through 65 regular season games. He was unable to propel SKA deep into the post-season, losing in the opening round.

==== Traktor Chelyabinsk ====
With SKA opted to undergo a roster revamp, Grigorenko was mutually released from his contract and was signed to a two-year contract with Traktor Chelyabinsk on 11 July 2025.

== International play ==
Medal record

Ice hockey

Representing Olympic Athletes from Russia

Olympic Games
Gold medal – first place	2018 Pyeongchang	

Representing ROC

Olympic Games
Silver medal – second place	2022 Beijing	

Representing Russia

World Championships
Bronze medal – third place	2019 Slovakia	

World Junior Championships
Silver medal – second place	2012 Canada	
Bronze medal – third place	2013 Ufa	
Bronze medal – third place	2014 Malmö	

IIHF World U18 Championships
Bronze medal – third place	2011 Germany	

Grigorenko first represented Russia as a 15-year-old at the 2009 Ivan Hlinka Memorial Tournament, where Russia finished second. In an extensive international junior career with Russia, Grigorenko helped Russia to collect three successive medals at the World Junior Championships, with a silver medal in Canada in 2012 followed by two bronze medals in his native Russia in 2013 and Sweden in 2014.

In his first season of his return to Russia professionally, Grigorenko was selected and played as a member of the Olympic Athletes from Russia team at the 2018 Winter Olympics. He recorded one goal and four points in six games to help claim the gold medal in an overtime victory over Germany.

On 23 January 2022, Grigorenko was named to the roster to represent Russian Olympic Committee athletes at the 2022 Winter Olympics.

== Personal life ==
Grigorenko was born in Khabarovsk, located in the Russian Far East near the border of China. His older brother, Yuri, also played hockey and spent five seasons in the minor leagues of both Russia and Belarus.

In 2011, after being selected by the Remparts in the CHL Import Draft, Grigorenko moved to Quebec City with his mother and Yuri. While he initially did not understand English, Grigorenko took classes five days a week with a Russian teacher, and by the end of the season he was able to conduct interviews in English without the aid of a translator.

== Career statistics ==
=== Regular season and playoffs ===
			Regular season					Playoffs
Season	Team	League	GP	G	A	Pts	PIM	GP	G	A	Pts	PIM
2010–11	Krasnaya Armiya	MHL	43	17	18	35	22	10	1	4	5	4
2011–12	Quebec Remparts	QMJHL	59	40	45	85	12	11	3	7	10	4
2012–13	Quebec Remparts	QMJHL	33	30	24	54	8	11	5	9	14	0
2012–13	Buffalo Sabres	NHL	25	1	4	5	0	—	—	—	—	—
2012–13	Rochester Americans	AHL	—	—	—	—	—	2	0	0	0	0
2013–14	Buffalo Sabres	NHL	18	2	1	3	2	—	—	—	—	—
2013–14	Quebec Remparts	QMJHL	23	15	24	39	6	5	1	8	9	6
2013–14	Rochester Americans	AHL	9	0	4	4	0	5	0	0	0	2
2014–15	Rochester Americans	AHL	43	14	22	36	27	—	—	—	—	—
2014–15	Buffalo Sabres	NHL	25	3	3	6	2	—	—	—	—	—
2015–16	Colorado Avalanche	NHL	74	6	21	27	8	—	—	—	—	—
2016–17	Colorado Avalanche	NHL	75	10	13	23	18	—	—	—	—	—
2017–18	CSKA Moscow	KHL	45	10	13	23	14	21	9	4	13	28
2018–19	CSKA Moscow	KHL	55	17	35	52	10	20	13	8	21	10
2019–20	CSKA Moscow	KHL	47	19	22	41	4	4	1	1	2	0
2020–21	Columbus Blue Jackets	NHL	32	4	8	12	6	—	—	—	—	—
2021–22	CSKA Moscow	KHL	41	18	15	33	8	22	8	4	12	2
2022–23	CSKA Moscow	KHL	64	22	27	49	8	27	12	13	25	0
2023–24	CSKA Moscow	KHL	59	18	27	45	12	5	3	4	7	0
2024–25	SKA Saint Petersburg	KHL	65	20	25	45	10	6	1	2	3	2
2025–26	Traktor Chelyabinsk	KHL	62	24	35	59	14	5	1	4	5	2
NHL totals			249	26	50	76	36	—	—	—	—	—
KHL totals			438	148	199	347	80	110	48	40	88	44

=== International ===
Year	Team	Event	Result	GP	G	A	Pts	PIM
2009	Russia	IH18	2nd place, silver medalist(s)	4	1	0	1	2
2010	Russia	U17	4th	6	4	6	10	10
2010	Russia	IH18	5th	4	0	4	4	4
2011	Russia	WJC18	3rd place, bronze medalist(s)	7	4	14	18	18
2011	Russia	IH18	3rd place, bronze medalist(s)	5	0	4	4	0
2012	Russia	WJC	2nd place, silver medalist(s)	6	2	3	5	0
2013	Russia	WJC	3rd place, bronze medalist(s)	7	2	4	6	2
2014	Russia	WJC	3rd place, bronze medalist(s)	7	5	3	8	0
2018	OAR	OG	1st place, gold medalist(s)	6	1	3	4	0
2018	Russia	WC	6th	8	4	2	6	0
2019	Russia	WC	3rd place, bronze medalist(s)	10	4	1	5	2
2021	ROC	WC	5th	5	3	4	7	2
2022	ROC	OG	2nd place, silver medalist(s)	6	1	0	1	0
Junior totals				46	18	38	56	36
Senior totals				35	13	10	23	4

== Awards and honours ==
Award	Year
QMJHL
CHL Top Prospects Game	2012
All-Rookie Team	2012
Rookie of the Year	2012
CHL Rookie of the Year	2012
Mike Bossy Trophy	2012
Michel Bergeron Trophy	2012
First All-Star Team	2012
KHL
All-Star Game	2019
Gagarin Cup (CSKA Moscow)	2019, 2022, 2023
Playoff MVP	2023

Awards and achievements
Preceded by Joel Armia	Buffalo Sabres first-round draft pick 2012	Succeeded by Zemgus Girgensons
Preceded by Nail Yakupov	Winner of the CHL Rookie of the Year Award; 2011–12	Succeeded by Valentin Zykov
