= Golden Helmet =

Golden Helmet may refer to:

- The Man with the Golden Helmet, a c. 1650 oil painting attributed to Rembrandt
- The Golden Helmet, a 1952 Donald Duck comic, written and drawn by Carl Barks
- The Golden Helmet of Coțofenești, a 5th century BCE Geto-Dacian artefact
- Casque d'Or (English: Golden Helmet), a 1952 French film
- Kultainen kypärä, a Finnish ice hockey award given to the best player in Liiga
- Guldhjälmen, a Swedish ice hockey award
- Golden Helmet Award, a Russian ice hockey award.
- Golden Helmet of Pardubice, an annual Czech speedway event
- Golden Helmet (Poland), an annual Polish speedway event
