= Damir Sharipzyanov =

Russian ice hockey player

- Born: 17 February 1996 (age 30) Nizhnekamsk, Russia
- Height: 6 ft 2 in (188 cm)
- Weight: 209 lb (95 kg; 14 st 13 lb)
- Position: Defence
- Shoots: Left
- KHL team Former teams: Avangard Omsk; Ontario Reign; Neftekhimik Nizhnekamsk
- National team: Russia
- NHL draft: Undrafted
- Playing career: 2016–present

Damir Sharipzyanov (Russian: Дамир Шарипзянов; born 17 February 1996) is a Russian professional ice hockey defenceman and captain for Avangard Omsk of the Kontinental Hockey League (KHL).

== Playing career ==
Sharipzyanov started his career in the academy of HC Neftekhimik Nizhnekamsk, his hometown club. In the 2013/14 season, he made his debut in the Youth Hockey League for JHC Reaktor, Neftekhimik's farm club.

He then went to North America to join the Owen Sound Attack in the Ontario Hockey League. In 2015, he signed a three-year entry-level contract with the Los Angeles Kings but was never called up to the NHL. He returned to Neftekhimik on loan for the 2017-18 KHL season, then left the LA Kings organization to sign a two-year extension.

On 8 May 2020, Sharipzyanov left Neftekhimik after three seasons, signing a new three-year contract as a free agent with Avangard Omsk. At first, he had to adapt into a more defensive role, but later became one of the team's top scorers and beat Avangard's club record for scoring by a defenceman. In his first season with Avangard, they won the Gagarin Cup and he was named the best defenceman of the Gagarin Cup Finals. In 2022, he became Avangard's captain. He was invited to the KHL All-Star Game in 2023 and 2025 and named to the KHL All-Star Team in 2025.

In the 2025-26 KHL season Sharipzyanov set the league record for points as a defenceman, scoring 67 (23+44) points across 66 regular season games.

=== International play ===
Medal record

Ice hockey

Representing ROC

Olympic Games
Silver medal – second place	2022 Beijing	

Representing Russia

World Junior Championships
Silver medal – second place	2016 Helsinki	

Sharipzyanov played for the Russian junior team at the 2013 Ivan Hlinka Memorial Tournament, the 2014 IIHF World U18 Championships and the 2016 IIHF World Junior Championships.

In 2018, Sharipzyanov won the Deutschland Cup and the Lucerne Cup with the Russian national team. He then played for Russia at the 2019 Kaufland Cup, the 2019 Karjala Cup and the 2021 and 2022 Channel One Cup.

On 23 January 2022, Sharipzyanov was named to the roster to represent Russian Olympic Committee athletes at the 2022 Winter Olympics. The team won silver medals, and Sharipzyanov was awarded the title of Honored Master of Sports of Russia.

== Personal life ==
Damir Sharipzyanov and his wife, Violetta, got married in 2020. They have a son, Daniar, and a daughter, Remillia.

== Career statistics ==
=== Regular season and playoffs ===
			Regular season					Playoffs
Season	Team	League	GP	G	A	Pts	PIM	GP	G	A	Pts	PIM
2012–13	Reaktor Nizhnekamsk	MHL	54	0	7	7	24	—	—	—	—	—
2013–14	Owen Sound Attack	OHL	67	5	11	16	65	5	0	1	1	0
2014–15	Owen Sound Attack	OHL	66	9	25	34	59	5	1	2	3	6
2015–16	Owen Sound Attack	OHL	46	5	16	21	34	6	1	3	4	4
2015–16	Ontario Reign	AHL	1	0	0	0	0	—	—	—	—	—
2016–17	Ontario Reign	AHL	38	0	3	3	57	—	—	—	—	—
2016–17	Manchester Monarchs	ECHL	10	2	2	4	6	—	—	—	—	—
2017–18	Neftekhimik Nizhnekamsk	KHL	54	5	11	16	44	3	0	0	0	2
2018–19	Neftekhimik Nizhnekamsk	KHL	61	8	16	24	20	—	—	—	—	—
2019–20	Neftekhimik Nizhnekamsk	KHL	60	5	21	26	32	4	0	0	0	2
2020–21	Avangard Omsk	KHL	48	2	6	8	22	24	3	5	8	8
2021–22	Avangard Omsk	KHL	39	2	8	10	18	13	3	3	6	14
2022–23	Avangard Omsk	KHL	66	7	12	19	34	14	1	5	6	10
2023–24	Avangard Omsk	KHL	66	9	44	53	26	12	1	4	5	6
2024–25	Avangard Omsk	KHL	68	13	34	47	37	13	2	4	6	12
2025–26	Avangard Omsk	KHL	66	23	44	67	30	17	2	8	10	15
KHL totals			528	74	196	270	263	100	12	29	41	69

=== International ===
Year	Team	Event	GP	G	A	Pts	PIM
2013	Russia	IH18	4	1	0	1	0
2014	Russia	WJC18	5	0	0	0	0
2016	Russia	WJC	7	0	0	0	4
2022	ROC	OG	6	0	0	0	4
Junior totals			16	1	0	1	4
Senior totals			6	0	0	0	4

== Awards and honors ==
Award	Year
KHL
Gagarin Cup (Avangard Omsk)	2021
All-Star Game	2023, 2025
Golden Helmet Award (All-Star Team)	2025
