= Ilya Nabokov =

Russian ice hockey player (born 2003)

- Born: March 27, 2003 (age 23) Kasli, Russia
- Height: 6 ft 1 in (185 cm)
- Weight: 179 lb (81 kg; 12 st 11 lb)
- Position: Goaltender
- Catches: Left
- NHL team (P) Cur. team Former teams: Colorado Avalanche; Colorado Eagles (AHL); Metallurg Magnitogorsk
- NHL draft: 38th overall, 2024; Colorado Avalanche
- Playing career: 2022–present

Ilya Nabokov (Russian: Илья Набоков, born March 27, 2003) is a Russian professional ice hockey player who is a goaltender for the Colorado Eagles in the American Hockey League (AHL) as a prospect under contract to the Colorado Avalanche of the National Hockey League (NHL). He was selected 38th overall, in the second round of the 2024 NHL entry draft by the Avalanche.

== Playing career ==
Nabokov first played hockey at the age of five, traveling 130 kilometers (81 mi) to play. He started playing as a skater, but switched to playing in goal in his second year, in part inspired by seeing Vasily Koshechkin play for the Russian national team. At 12, he was invited to play in Metallurg. He made his Junior Hockey League (MHL) debut with Stalnye Lisy during the 2019–20 season.

In 36 regular season games in the 2021–22 season, Nabokov recorded five shutouts and a 2.06 goals against average.

In his Kontinental Hockey League (KHL) debut against Kunlun Red Star on November 29, 2022, his lone KHL appearance in the season, Nabokov played less than five minutes and faced just one shot. In the MHL, he was selected for the MHL Challenge Cup at the 2022 KHL All-Star Game, and was nominated for the award for best goaltender.

Nabokov became a KHL regular in 2023–24, taking on a starter role due to the departure of Edward Pasquale and recording a .930 save percentage in 43 games. His first KHL start came on September 9, 2023, a 4–3 opening night victory over HC Vityaz in which he made 23 saves on 26 shots. His first shutout came on October 17, a 29-save blanking of Avtomobilist Yekaterinburg. In 22 playoff games, Nabokov recorded a .941 save percentage, and in Metallurg's Gagarin Cup finals sweep of Lokomotiv Yaroslavl he allowed only three goals. At 21 years and 32 days, he became the youngest playoff MVP in KHL history, beating the previous record of 23 years and 128 days set by goaltender Ilya Sorokin.

On June 29, 2024, Nabokov was selected with the 38th overall pick, in the second round of the 2024 NHL entry draft by the Colorado Avalanche, their first selection in the draft. It was his fourth draft-eligible season.

In the 2024–25 season with Metallurg, Nabokov as the starting goaltender posted a 23-17-6 record with a 2.22 GAA, a .923 SV%, and three shutouts in 49 regular-season appearances. He also appeared in five playoff games, recording a 2.13 GAA and a .920 Sv%. In the regular season, Nabokov ranked 14th in the league in Sv% and 11th in GAA (min 20 GP), and tied for sixth in wins. At the conclusion of the season, Nabokov was signed by the Colorado Avalanche to a two-year, entry-level contract on 31 May 2025. It was immediately confirmed by Metallurg that Nabokov would remain with the club for the 2025–26 season on loan from the Avalanche.

== International play ==
Nabokov played for Russia U20 at the 2022 Future Cup. He won the 2024 Channel One Cup with Russia, appearing in all three matches and earning best goaltender honors for the event.

== Career statistics ==
			Regular season									Playoffs
Season	Team	League	GP	W	L	OTL	MIN	GA	SO	GAA	SV%	GP	W	L	MIN	GA	SO	GAA	SV%
2019–20	Stalnye Lisy	MHL	2	0	0	0	26	1	0	2.26	.917	—	—	—	—	—	—	—	—
2020–21	Stalnye Lisy	MHL	33	18	10	2	1,778	61	4	2.06	.925	5	4	3	194	12	1	3.70	.905
2021–22	Stalnye Lisy	MHL	36	25	8	1	2,034	70	5	2.06	.932	8	4	3	437	19	0	2.61	.921
2022–23	Stalnye Lisy	MHL	34	18	9	7	2,018	65	5	1.93	.933	4	1	3	218	11	0	3.02	.903
2022–23	Metallurg Magnitogorsk	KHL	1	0	0	0	4	0	0	0.00	1.000	—	—	—	—	—	—	—	—
2023–24	Metallurg Magnitogorsk	KHL	43	23	13	3	2,231	80	3	2.15	.930	23	16	6	1,349	41	4	1.82	.942
2024–25	Metallurg Magnitogorsk	KHL	49	23	17	6	2,725	101	3	2.22	.923	5	2	3	310	11	0	2.13	.920
2025–26	Metallurg Magnitogorsk	KHL	38	22	7	5	2,121	97	1	2.74	.901	7	2	4	426	18	0	2.53	.892
KHL totals			131	68	37	14	7,083	278	7	2.35	.919	35	20	13	2,086	70	4	2.01	.930

== Awards and honors ==
Award	Year	Ref
MHL
All-Star Game	2022	
KHL
Rookie of the Year	2024	
Golden Helmet Award	2024	
Gagarin Cup champion	2024	
Gagarin Cup MVP	2024	
