= Daniil Isayev =

Russian ice hockey goaltender (born 2000)

- Born: 7 January 2000 (age 26) Yaroslavl, Russia
- Height: 6 ft 0 in (183 cm)
- Weight: 163 lb (74 kg; 11 st 9 lb)
- Position: Goaltender
- Catches: Left
- KHL team: Lokomotiv Yaroslavl
- Playing career: 2018–present

Daniil Alexandrovich Isayev (Russian: Даниил Александрович Исаев; born January 7, 2000) is a Russian professional ice hockey goaltender. He is currently playing for Lokomotiv Yaroslavl in the Kontinental Hockey League (KHL). He won the Gagarin Cup with Lokomotiv in 2025 and 2026. He was recognized as the KHL's best goaltender in the 2023-2024 and 2024-2025 seasons. In the 2025-26 season, he became the most valuable player of the 2026 Gagarin Cup.

== Playing career ==
Isayev played his entire career in the system of his hometown club Lokomotiv Yaroslavl. In the 2016/2017 season, he debuted for Loko-Junior, Lokomotiv's second-tier junior team, playing in the NMHL. In the next season, he was promoted to Loko, the club's main junior team in the MHL. With Loko, won back-to-back Kharlamov Cups in 2018 and 2019.

On October 2, 2018 Isayev made his Kontinental Hockey League debut against Neftekhimik Nizhnekamsk.

In the 2021-22 KHL season, Isayev was Edward Pasquale's backup and played 11 games with a save percentage of .918 across the regular season and playoffs. His Gagarin Cup Playoffs debut was on March 5, 2022 in a triple overtime loss to HC CSKA Moscow in Game 3 of the first round.

In the 2022-23 KHL season, Isayev became Lokomotiv's starting goalie. He played 50 games across the regular season and playoffs with a save percentage of .934 and seven shutouts, received a KHL All-Star Game invite and was nominated for the league's best goaltender award at the end of the season.

In the 2023-24 KHL season, Isayev reached the Gagarin Cup Final with Lokomotiv and was recognized as the KHL's goaltender of the year.

In the 2024-25 KHL season, Isayev and Lokomotiv won the Gagarin Cup and he received his second goaltender of the year award in a row.

In the 2025-26 KHL season, Isayev led Lokomotiv to their second Gagarin Cup and was recognized as the most valuable player of the Gagarin Cup Playoffs.

== International play ==
Isayev won bronze medals with Russia at the World U-17 Hockey Challenge in 2016. He was called to play for Russia at the 2018 U18 World Championship and played one game.

He was called to Russia's team at the 2020 World Junior Championship, but did not play any games. Russia won silver medals at the event.

== Career statistics ==
			Regular season									Playoffs
Season	Team	League	G	W	L	Shootouts	TOI	GA	SO	GAA	SV%	G	W	L	TOI	GA	SO	GAA	SV%
2016/17	Loko-Junior	NMHL	5	1	4	0	273:21	15	0	3.29	90.5	1	1	0	60:00	1	0	1.00	95.7
2017/18	Loko	MHL	19	14	4	1	1078:34	28	5	1.56	93.6	1	0	1	70:00	3	0	2:57	90.3
2017/18	Loko-Junior	NMHL	—	—	—	—	—	—	—	—	—	1	1	0	60:00	1	0	1.00	95.7
2018/19	Lokomotiv Yaroslavl	KHL	5	3	2	0	230:11	5	1	1.30	95.3	—	—	—	—	—	—	—	—
2018/19	Loko	MHL	21	15	4	2	1310:40	44	1	2.01	93.2	7	5	2	418:45	10	2	1.43	95.1
2019/20	Lokomotiv Yaroslavl	KHL	3	2	0	1	163:25	6	0	2.20	91.7	—	—	—	—	—	—	—	—
2019/20	Loko	MHL	4	4	0	0	241:22	4	1	0.99	95.9	1	1	0	59:58	2	0	2.00	90.9
2019/20	Buran Voronezh	VHL	15	3	8	4	639:41	28	1	2.63	90.7	—	-—	—	—	—	—	—	—
2020/21	Lokomotiv Yaroslavl	KHL	3	1	2	0	126:48	5	1	2.37	88.4	—	—	—	—	—	—	—	—
2020/21	Buran Voronezh	VHL	12	2	9	1	631:30	35	0	3.33	89.6	—	—	—	—	—	—	—	—
2021/22	Lokomotiv Yaroslavl	KHL	8	2	5	1	474:16	16	1	2.02	90.6	2	0	2	186:32	7	0	1.74	92.4
2022/23	Lokomotiv Yaroslavl	KHL	38	21	13	4	2210:17	59	5	1.60	93.4	12	7	5	766:25	21	2	1.64	93.3
2023/24	Lokomotiv Yaroslavl	KHL	49	32	14	3	2913:12	94	4	1.94	92.5	20	12	8	1235:20	34	3	1.65	93.2
2024/25	Lokomotiv Yaroslavl	KHL	41	29	9	3	2454:04	66	8	1.61	92.4	21	16	5	1295:09	33	2	1.53	93.8
2025/26	Lokomotiv Yaroslavl	KHL	56	30	18	8	3304:10	104	7	1.89	92.7	22	16	6	1368:11	32	5	1.71	93.2
KHL totals			204	121	60	20	11937:03	358	27	1.80	92.6	77	51	26	4851:37	134	12	1.66	93.3

== Awards and honours ==
Award	Year
KHL
Gagarin Cup champion	2025, 2026
