= NHL All-Rookie Team =

Ice hockey team of all rookies

The NHL All-Rookie Team is chosen by the Professional Hockey Writers' Association from the best rookies in the National Hockey League (NHL) at each position for the season just concluded based on their performance in that year. The team was first named after the 1982–83 NHL season and since then many future stars have been selected.

The team consists of one goalie, two defencemen and three forwards. In order to be considered a rookie in the NHL, the rookie must be eligible to win the Calder Memorial Trophy. The qualification criteria to be eligible are that the player must not have played in more than 25 NHL games in any previous year nor played in six or more NHL games in each of any two preceding seasons, as well as being under the age of 26 on September 15 of the season in which he is eligible. The age consideration was added after Sergei Makarov won the trophy at age 31 in 1990.

The only player to be awarded the Calder Trophy without being named to the All-Rookie Team is Pavel Bure (in 1991–92), because he received votes at both right wing and left wing, but not enough to lead at either position. Since that time, the rules have been changed so that all forwards are voted on together. Jamie Storr and Jake Allen are the only players to be named to the All-Rookie Team more than once, both having done so twice in 1997–98 and 1998–99 (Storr) and 2012–13 and 2014–15 (Allen).

== Selections ==
^	Denotes players who are still active in the NHL
*	Denotes players who have been inducted into the Hockey Hall of Fame as a player
†	Denotes inactive players not yet eligible for Hockey Hall of Fame consideration
**Player** (in bold text)	Indicates the player who won the Calder Memorial Trophy as the NHL's Rookie of the Year
Player (in italic text)	Indicates the player who was drafted first overall

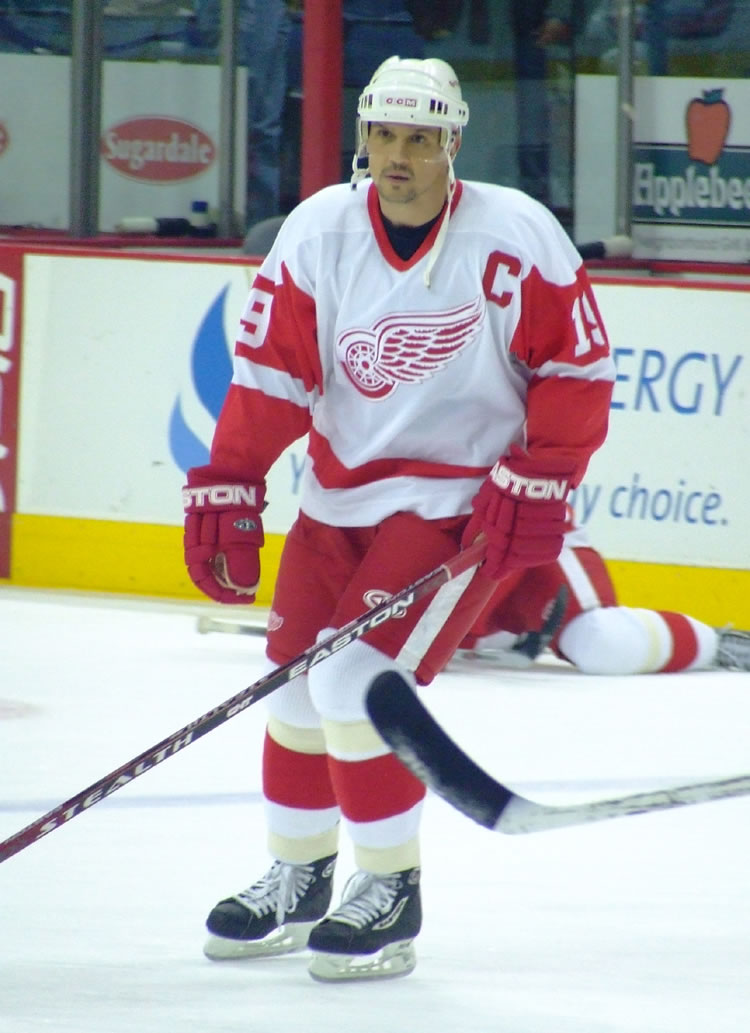
Steve Yzerman was named to the All-Rookie Team in the 1983–84 season.

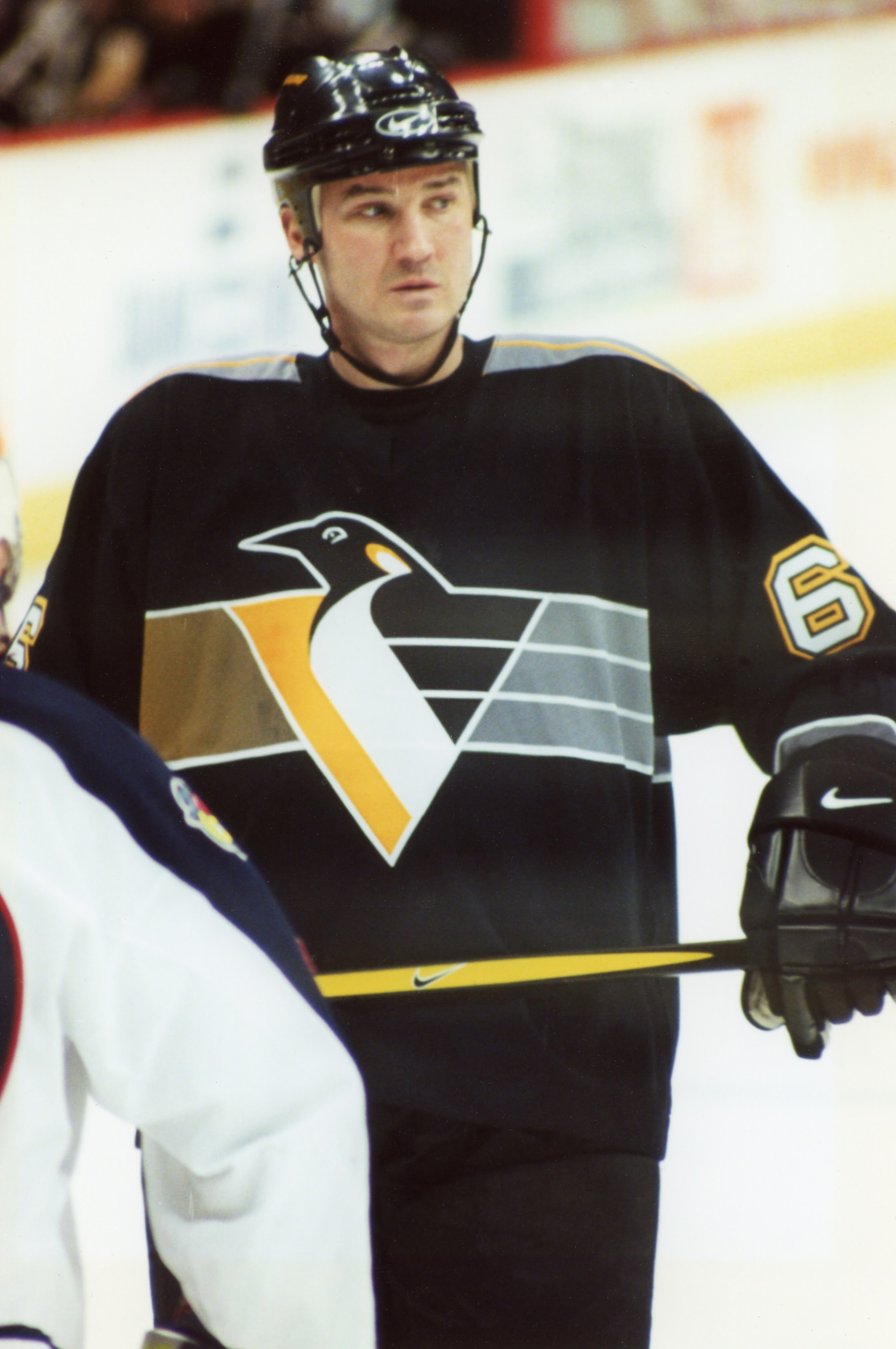
Mario Lemieux was named to the All-Rookie Team in the 1984–85 season.

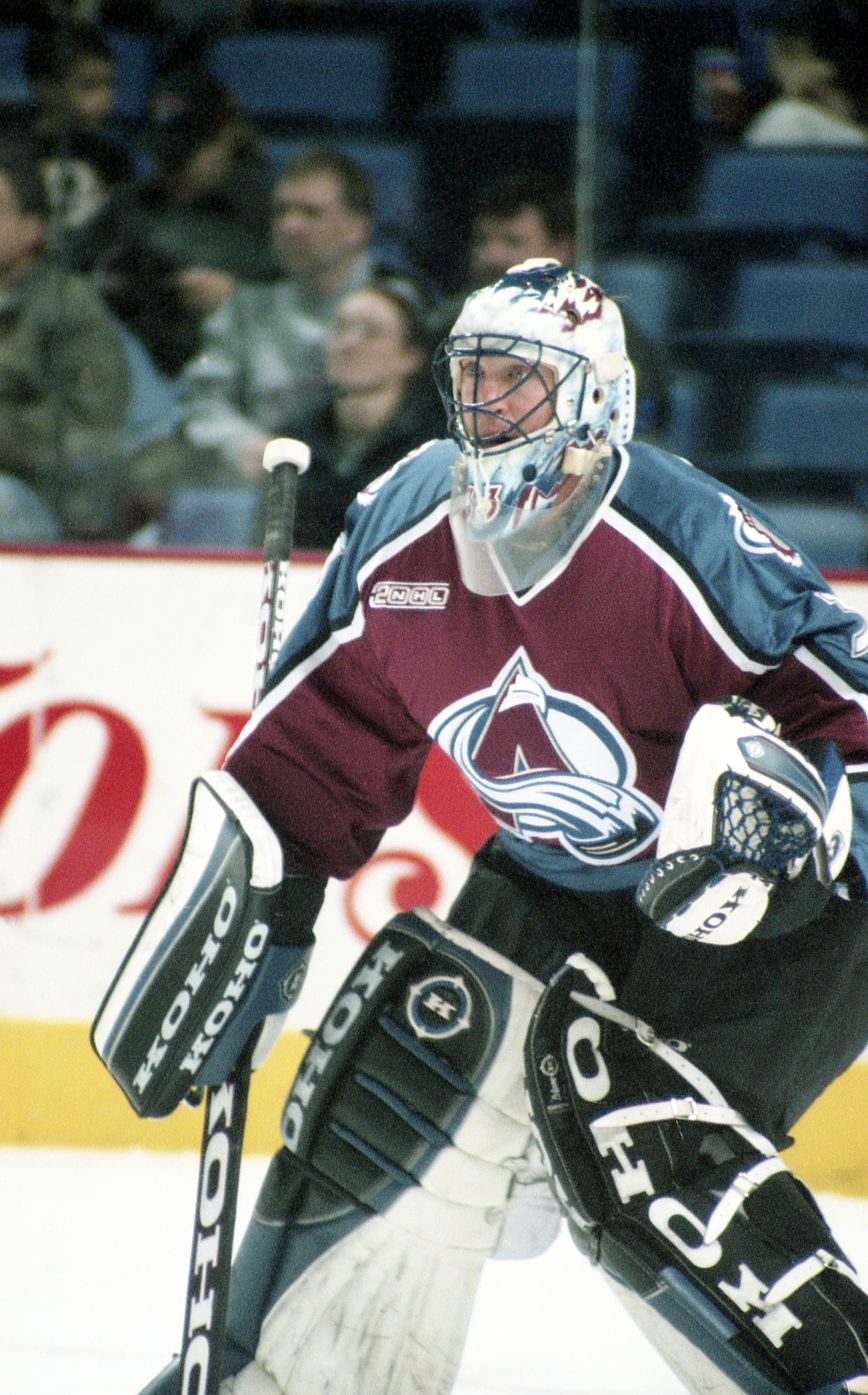
Patrick Roy was named to the All-Rookie Team in the 1985–86 season.

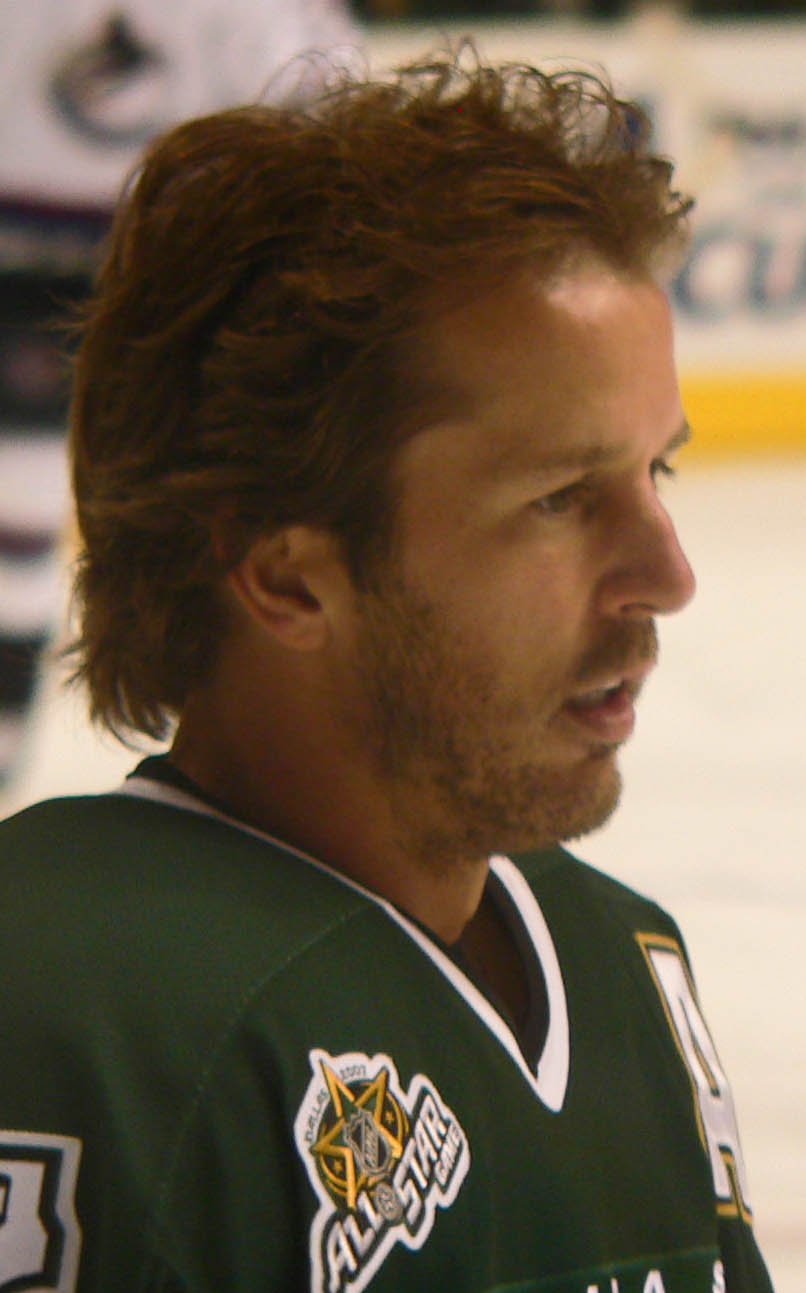
Mike Modano was named to the All-Rookie Team in the 1989–90 season.

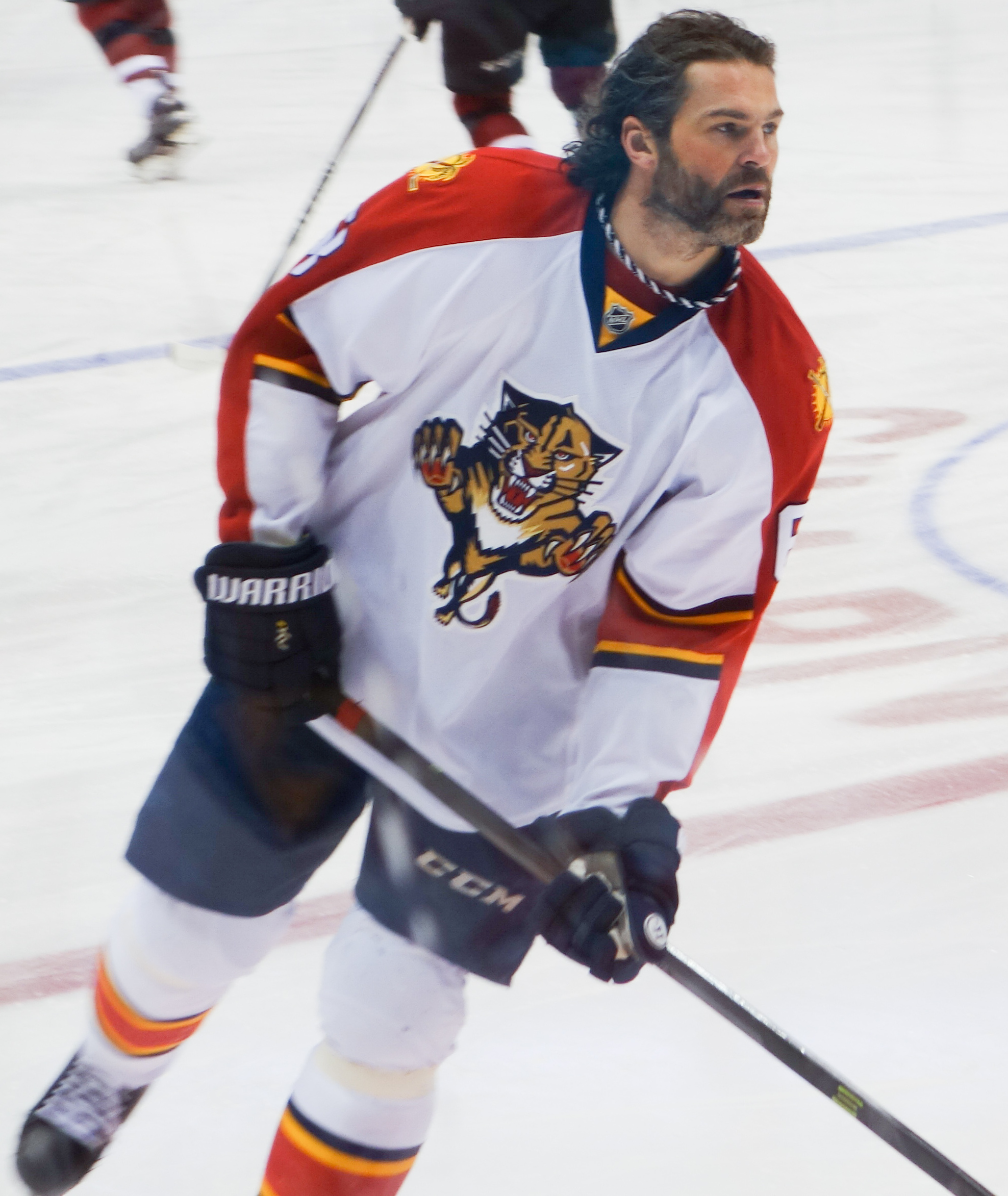
Jaromir Jagr was named to the All-Rookie Team in the 1990–91 season.

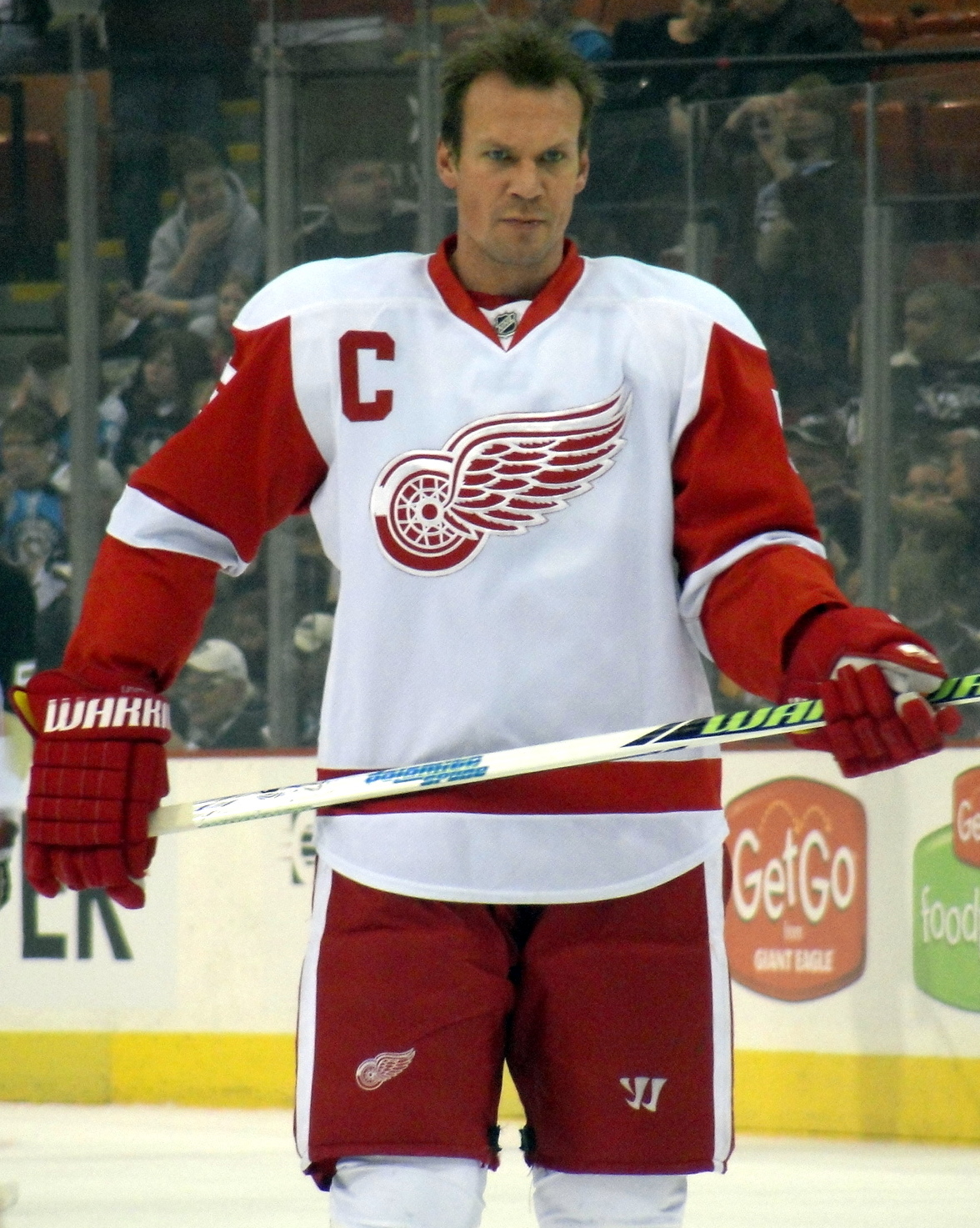
Nicklas Lidstrom was named to the All-Rookie Team in the 1991–92 season.

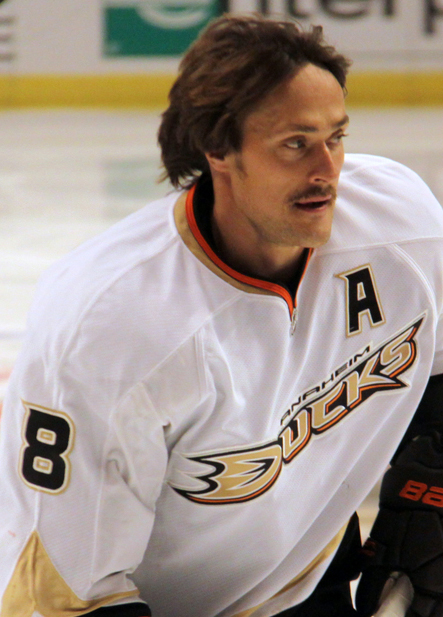
Teemu Selanne was named to the All-Rookie Team in the 1992–93 season.

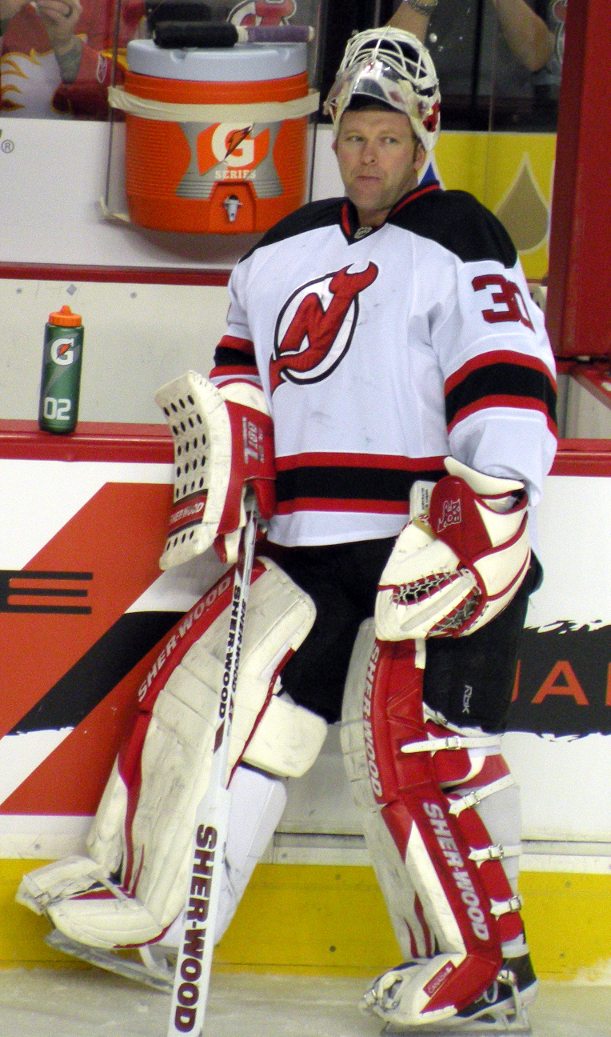
Martin Brodeur was named to the All-Rookie Team in the 1993–94 season.

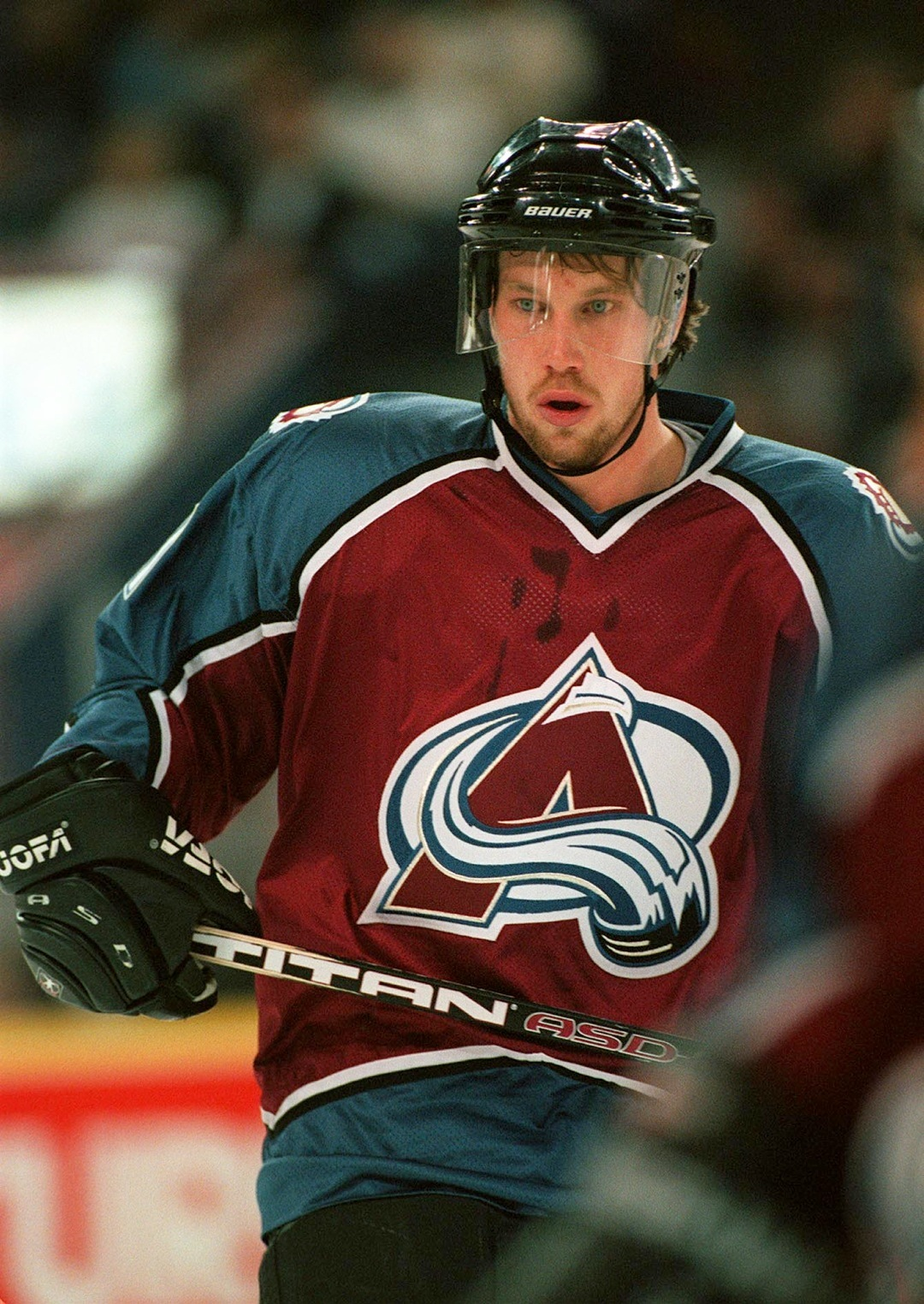
Peter Forsberg was named to the All-Rookie Team in the 1994–95 season.

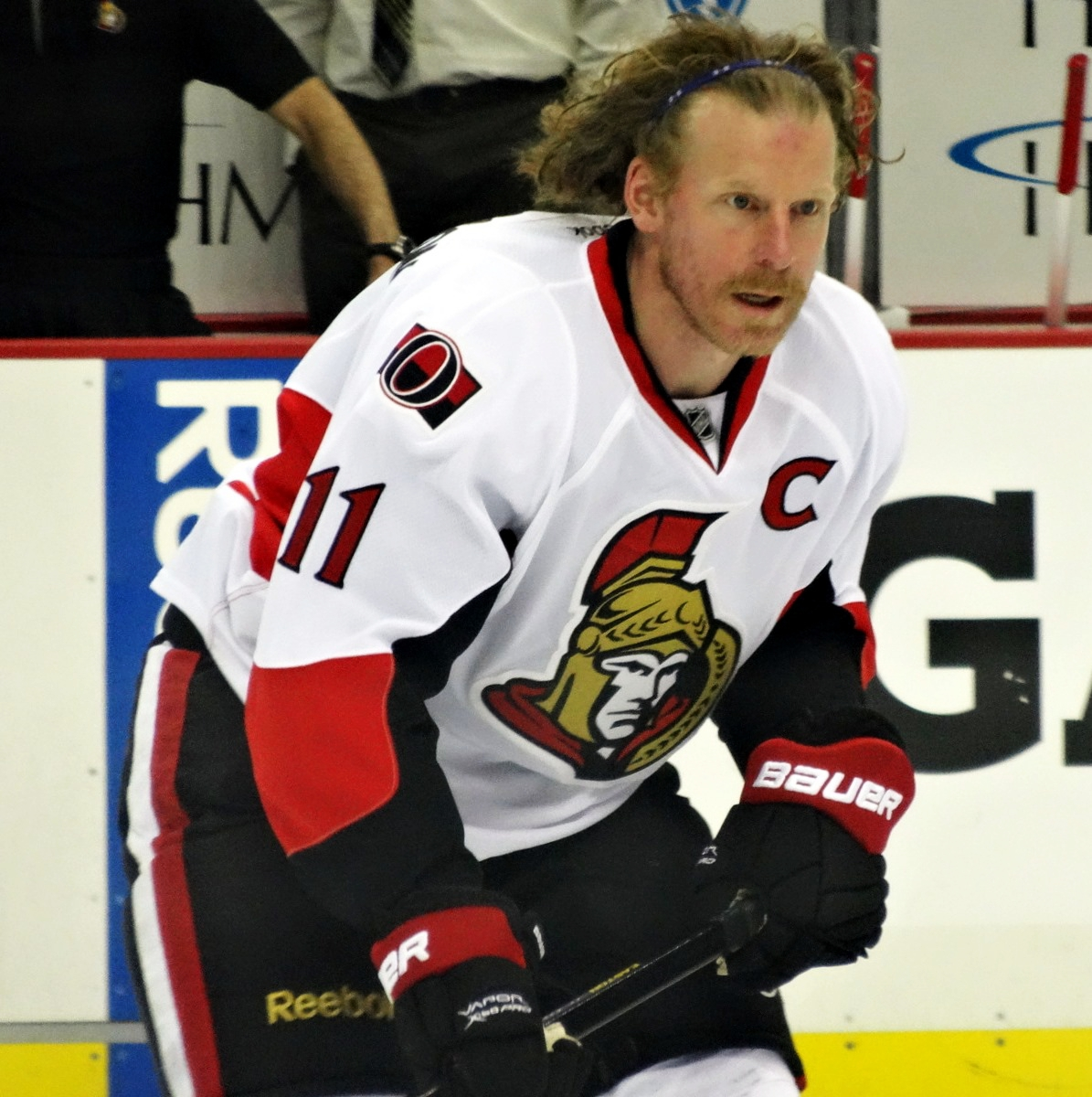
Daniel Alfredsson was named to the All-Rookie Team in the 1995–96 season.

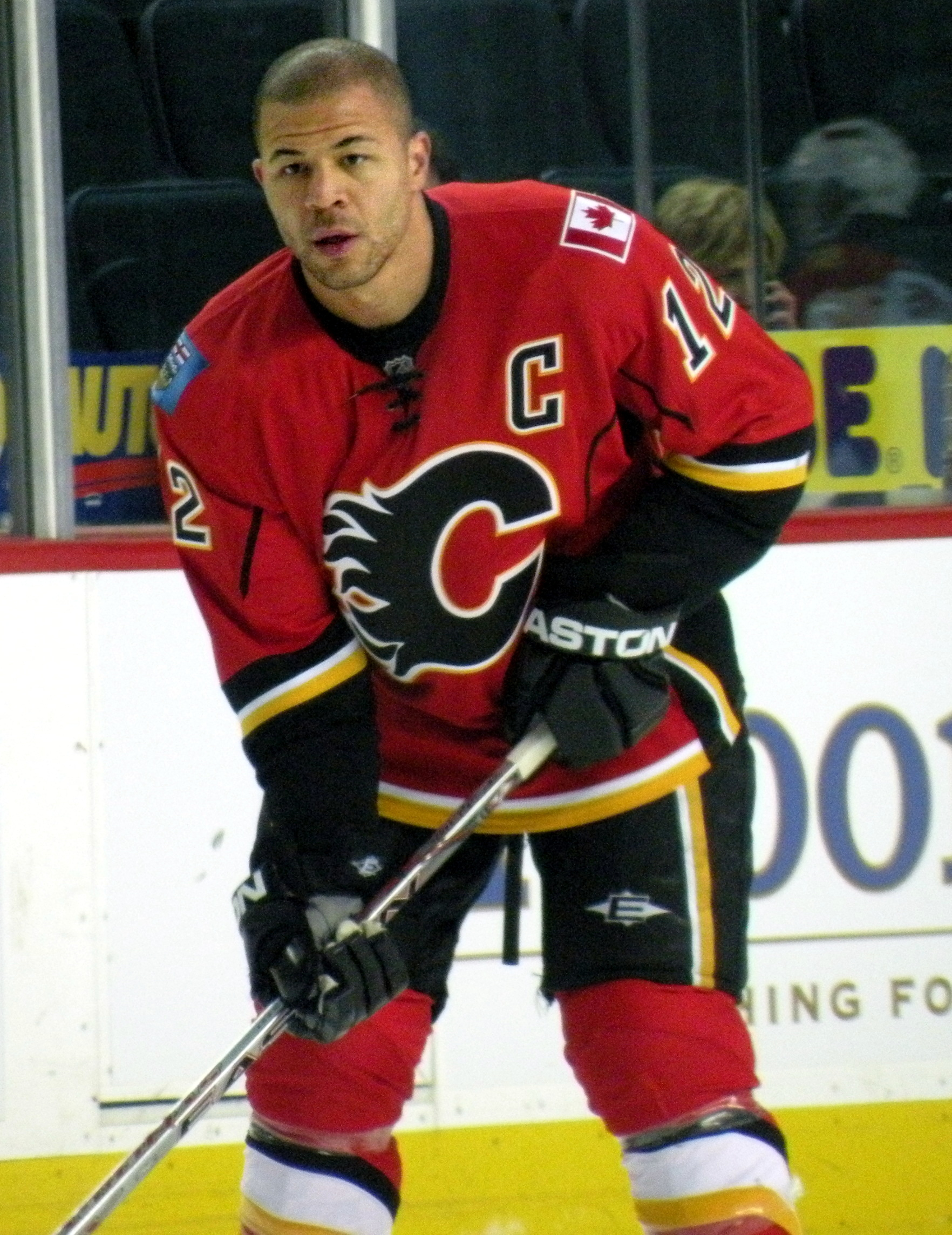
Jarome Iginla was named to the All-Rookie Team in the 1996–97 season.

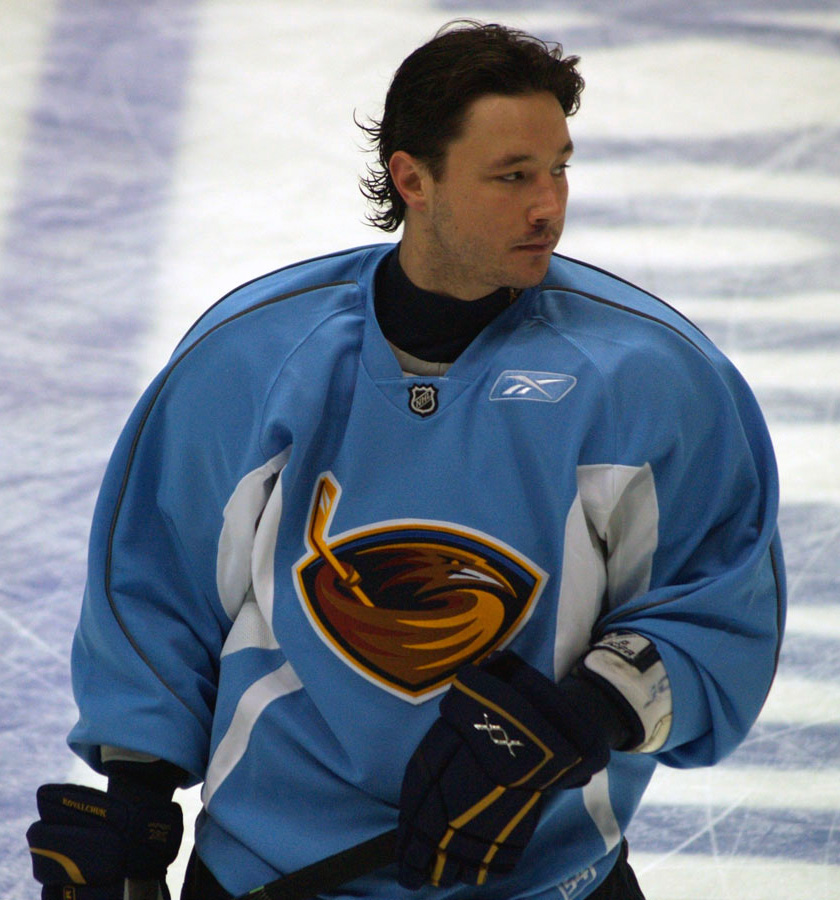
Ilya Kovalchuk was named to the All-Rookie Team in the 2001–02 season.

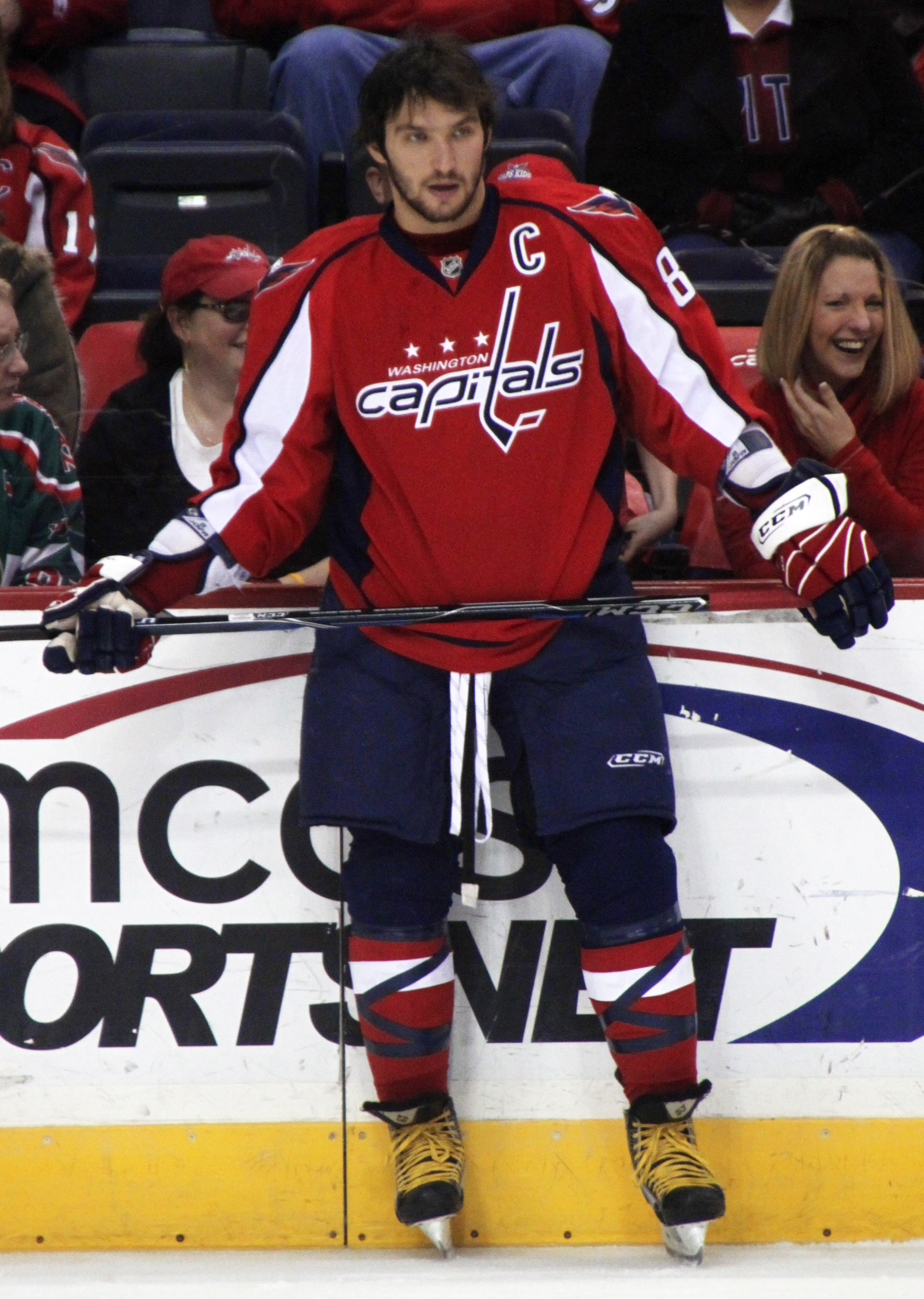
Alexander Ovechkin was named to the All-Rookie Team in the 2005–06 season.

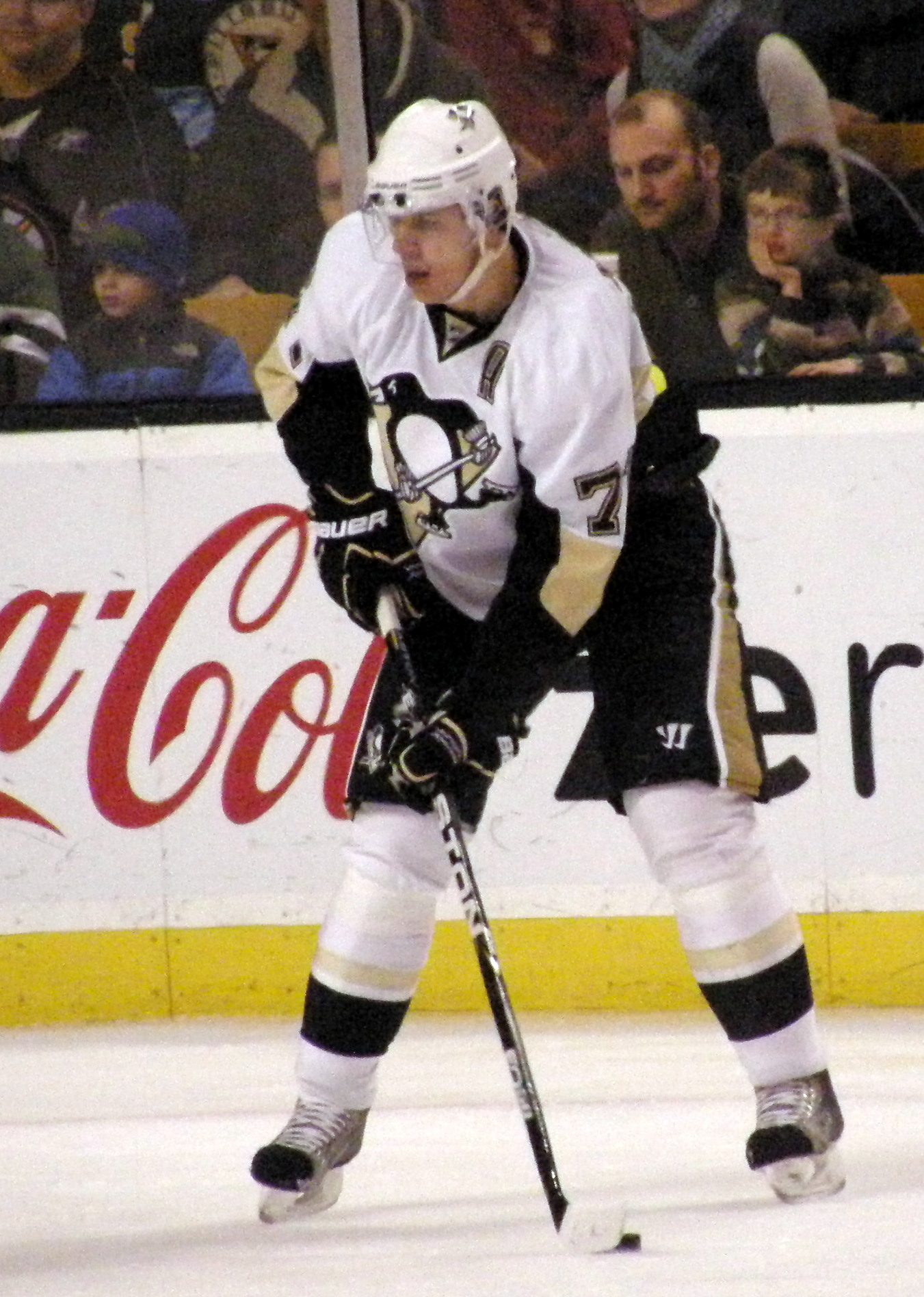
Evgeni Malkin was named to the All-Rookie Team in the 2006–07 season.

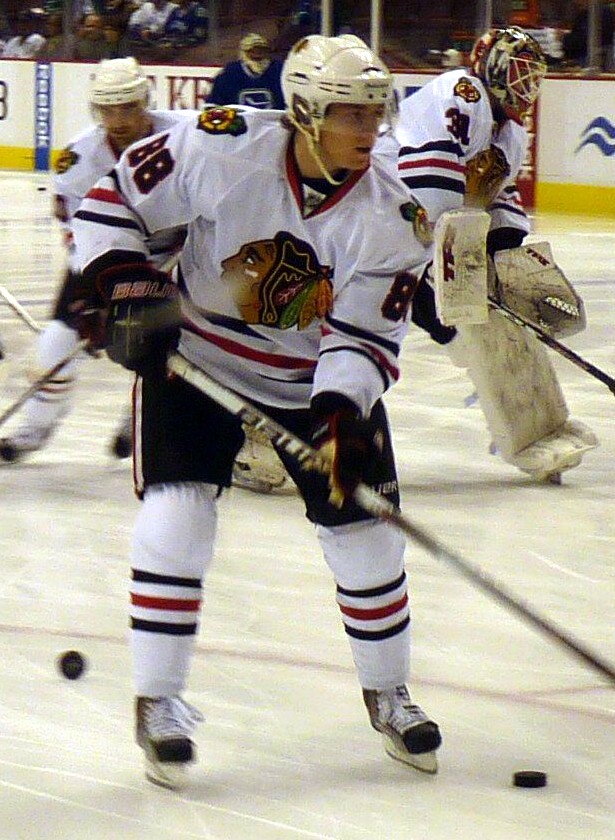
Patrick Kane was named to the All-Rookie Team in the 2007–08 season.

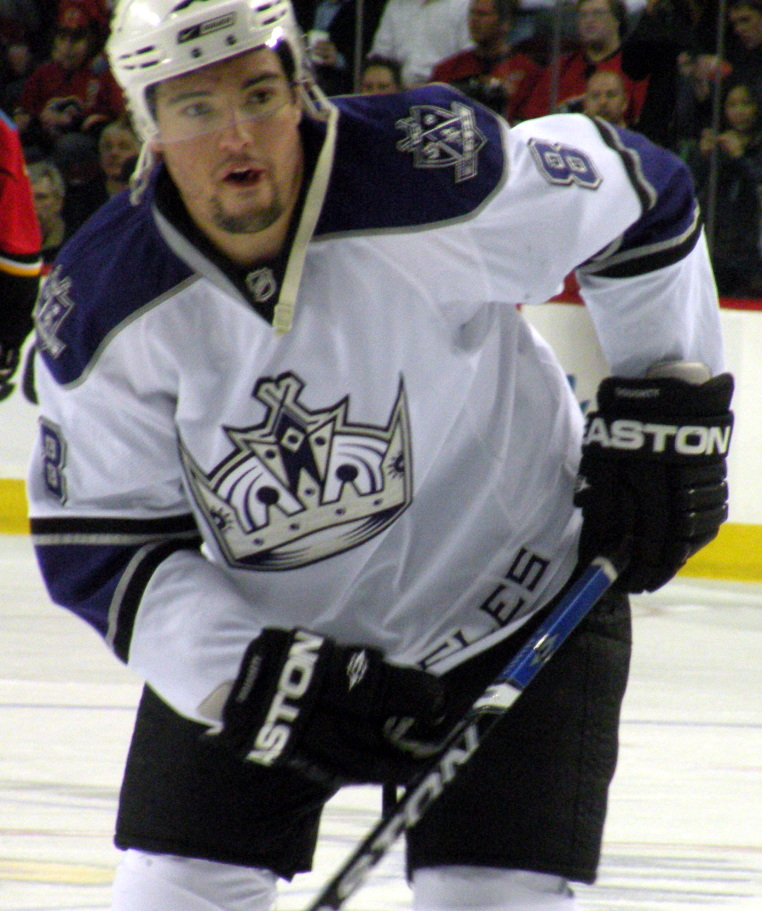
Drew Doughty was named to the All-Rookie Team in the 2008–09 season.

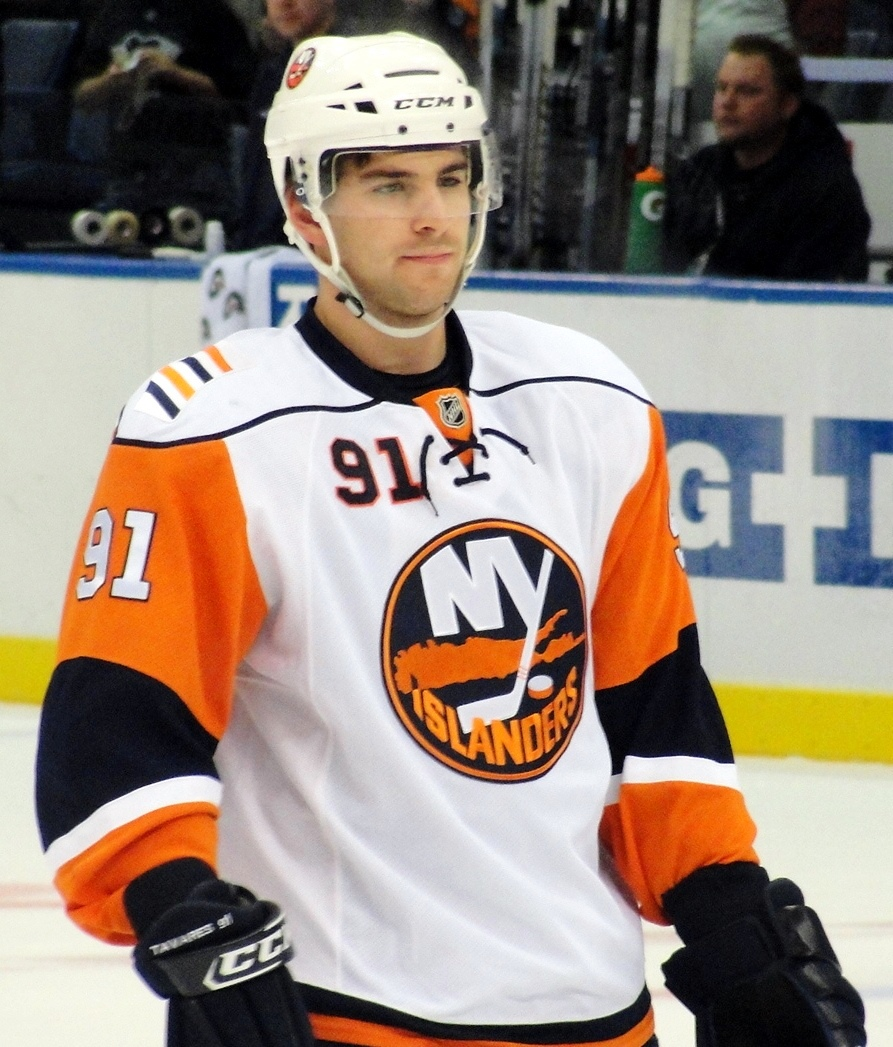
John Tavares was named to the All-Rookie Team in the 2009–10 season.

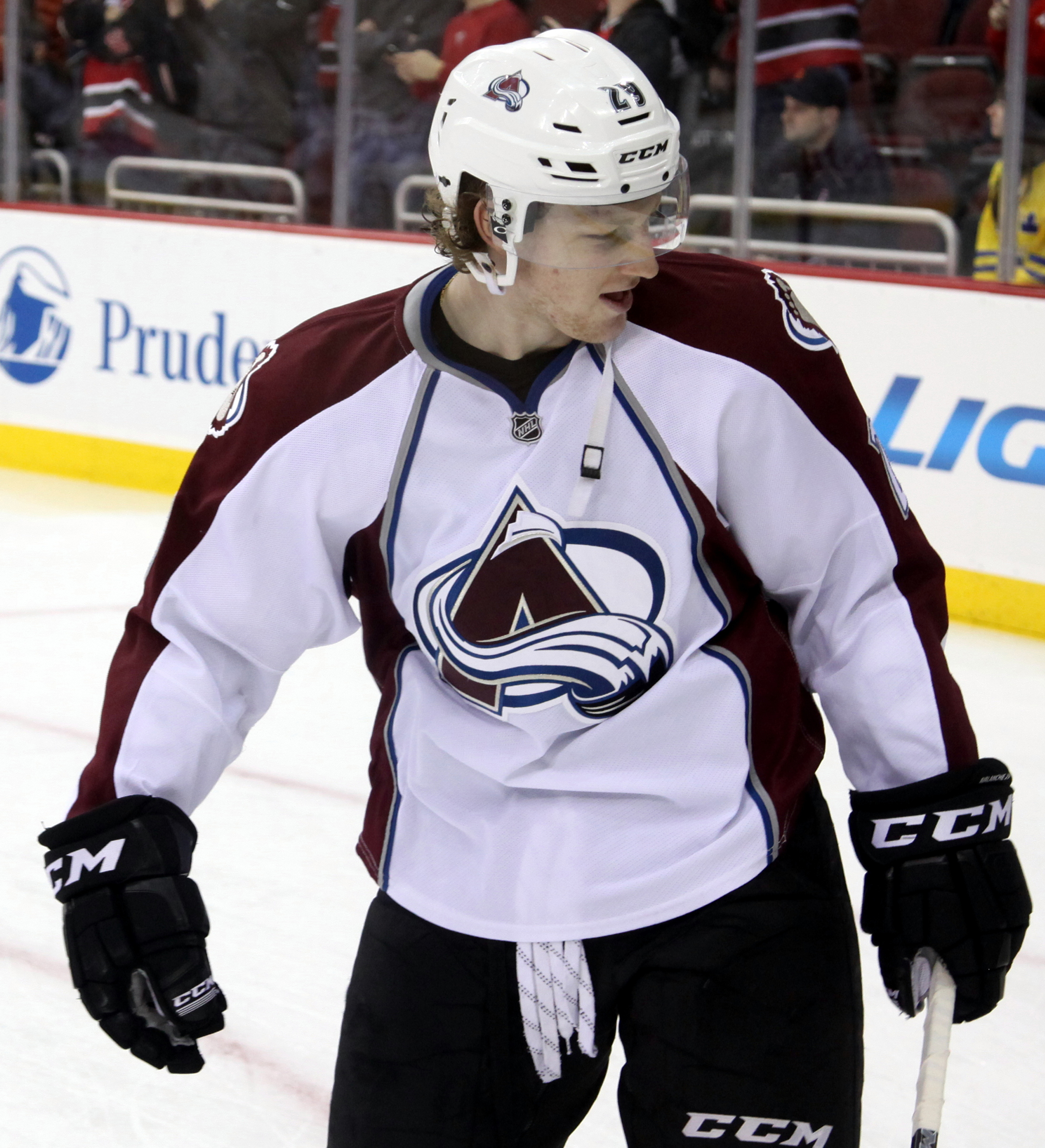
Nathan MacKinnon was named to the All-Rookie Team in the 2013–14 season.

Season	Pos		
Season	Pos	Player	Team(s)
1982–83
1982–83	F	Dan Daoust	Montreal Canadiens; Toronto Maple Leafs
1982–83	F	**Steve Larmer**	Chicago Black Hawks
1982–83	F	Mats Naslund	Montreal Canadiens
1982–83	D	Phil Housley*	Buffalo Sabres
1982–83	D	Scott Stevens*	Washington Capitals
1982–83	G	Pelle Lindbergh	Philadelphia Flyers
1983–84	F	Haakon Loob	Calgary Flames
1983–84	F	Sylvain Turgeon	Hartford Whalers
1983–84	F	Steve Yzerman*	Detroit Red Wings
1983–84	D	Thomas Eriksson	Philadelphia Flyers
1983–84	D	Jamie Macoun	Calgary Flames
1983–84	G	**Tom Barrasso***	Buffalo Sabres
1984–85	F	**Mario Lemieux***	Pittsburgh Penguins
1984–85	F	Tomas Sandstrom	New York Rangers
1984–85	F	Warren Young	Pittsburgh Penguins
1984–85	D	Bruce Bell	Quebec Nordiques
1984–85	D	Chris Chelios*	Montreal Canadiens
1984–85	G	Steve Penney	Montreal Canadiens
1985–86	F	Wendel Clark	Toronto Maple Leafs
1985–86	F	Kjell Dahlin	Montreal Canadiens
1985–86	F	Mike Ridley	New York Rangers
1985–86	D	Dana Murzyn	Hartford Whalers
1985–86	D	**Gary Suter**	Calgary Flames
1985–86	G	Patrick Roy*	Montreal Canadiens
1986–87	F	Jimmy Carson	Los Angeles Kings
1986–87	F	**Luc Robitaille***	Los Angeles Kings
1986–87	F	Jim Sandlak	Vancouver Canucks
1986–87	D	Brian Benning	St. Louis Blues
1986–87	D	Steve Duchesne	Los Angeles Kings
1986–87	G	Ron Hextall	Philadelphia Flyers
1987–88	F	Iain Duncan	Winnipeg Jets
1987–88	F	**Joe Nieuwendyk***	Calgary Flames
1987–88	F	Ray Sheppard	Buffalo Sabres
1987–88	D	Calle Johansson	Buffalo Sabres
1987–88	D	Glen Wesley	Boston Bruins
1987–88	G	Darren Pang	Chicago Blackhawks
1988–89	F	Tony Granato	New York Rangers
1988–89	F	Trevor Linden	Vancouver Canucks
1988–89	F	David Volek	New York Islanders
1988–89	D	**Brian Leetch***	New York Rangers
1988–89	D	Zarley Zalapski	Pittsburgh Penguins
1988–89	G	Peter Sidorkiewicz	Hartford Whalers
1989–90	F	Rod Brind'Amour	St. Louis Blues
1989–90	F	**Sergei Makarov***	Calgary Flames
1989–90	F	Mike Modano*	Minnesota North Stars
1989–90	D	Brad Shaw	Hartford Whalers
1989–90	D	Geoff Smith	Edmonton Oilers
1989–90	G	Bob Essensa	Winnipeg Jets
1990–91	F	Sergei Fedorov*	Detroit Red Wings
1990–91	F	Ken Hodge Jr.	Boston Bruins
1990–91	F	Jaromir Jagr^{†}	Pittsburgh Penguins
1990–91	D	Rob Blake*	Los Angeles Kings
1990–91	D	Eric Weinrich	New Jersey Devils
1990–91	G	**Ed Belfour***	Chicago Blackhawks
1991–92	F	Tony Amonte	New York Rangers
1991–92	F	Gilbert Dionne	Montreal Canadiens
1991–92	F	Kevin Todd	New Jersey Devils
1991–92	D	Vladimir Konstantinov	Detroit Red Wings
1991–92	D	Nicklas Lidstrom*	Detroit Red Wings
1991–92	G	Dominik Hasek*	Chicago Blackhawks
1992–93	F	Joe Juneau	Boston Bruins
1992–93	F	Eric Lindros*	Philadelphia Flyers
1992–93	F	**Teemu Selanne***	Winnipeg Jets
1992–93	D	Vladimir Malakhov	New York Islanders
1992–93	D	Scott Niedermayer*	New Jersey Devils
1992–93	G	Felix Potvin	Toronto Maple Leafs
1993–94	F	Jason Arnott	Edmonton Oilers
1993–94	F	Oleg Petrov	Montreal Canadiens
1993–94	F	Mikael Renberg	Philadelphia Flyers
1993–94	D	Boris Mironov	Winnipeg Jets; Edmonton Oilers
1993–94	D	Chris Pronger*	Hartford Whalers
1993–94	G	**Martin Brodeur***	New Jersey Devils
1994–95	F	**Peter Forsberg***	Quebec Nordiques
1994–95	F	Jeff Friesen	San Jose Sharks
1994–95	F	Paul Kariya*	Mighty Ducks of Anaheim
1994–95	D	Kenny Jonsson	Toronto Maple Leafs
1994–95	D	Chris Therien	Philadelphia Flyers
1994–95	G	Jim Carey	Washington Capitals
1995–96	F	**Daniel Alfredsson***	Ottawa Senators
1995–96	F	Eric Daze	Chicago Blackhawks
1995–96	F	Petr Sykora	New Jersey Devils
1995–96	D	Ed Jovanovski	Florida Panthers
1995–96	D	Kyle McLaren	Boston Bruins
1995–96	G	Corey Hirsch	Vancouver Canucks
1996–97	F	Sergei Berezin	Toronto Maple Leafs
1996–97	F	Jim Campbell	St. Louis Blues
1996–97	F	Jarome Iginla*	Calgary Flames
1996–97	D	**Bryan Berard**	New York Islanders
1996–97	D	Janne Niinimaa	Philadelphia Flyers
1996–97	G	Patrick Lalime	Pittsburgh Penguins
1997–98	F	Patrik Elias	New Jersey Devils
1997–98	F	Mike Johnson	Toronto Maple Leafs
1997–98	F	**Sergei Samsonov**	Boston Bruins
1997–98	D	Derek Morris	Calgary Flames
1997–98	D	Matthias Ohlund	Vancouver Canucks
1997–98	G	Jamie Storr	Los Angeles Kings
1998–99	F	**Chris Drury**	Colorado Avalanche
1998–99	F	Milan Hejduk	Colorado Avalanche
1998–99	F	Marian Hossa*	Ottawa Senators
1998–99	D	Tom Poti	Edmonton Oilers
1998–99	D	Sami Salo	Ottawa Senators
1998–99	G	Jamie Storr (2)	Los Angeles Kings
1999–2000	F	Simon Gagne	Philadelphia Flyers
1999–2000	F	**Scott Gomez**	New Jersey Devils
1999–2000	F	Mike York	New York Rangers
1999–2000	D	Brian Rafalski	New Jersey Devils
1999–2000	D	Brad Stuart	San Jose Sharks
1999–2000	G	Brian Boucher	Philadelphia Flyers
2000–01	F	Martin Havlat	Ottawa Senators
2000–01	F	Brad Richards	Tampa Bay Lightning
2000–01	F	Shane Willis	Carolina Hurricanes
2000–01	D	Lubomir Visnovsky	Los Angeles Kings
2000–01	D	Colin White	New Jersey Devils
2000–01	G	**Evgeni Nabokov**	San Jose Sharks
2001–02	F	**Dany Heatley**	Atlanta Thrashers
2001–02	F	Kristian Huselius	Florida Panthers
2001–02	F	Ilya Kovalchuk^{†}	Atlanta Thrashers
2001–02	D	Nick Boynton	Boston Bruins
2001–02	D	Rostislav Klesla	Columbus Blue Jackets
2001–02	G	Dan Blackburn	New York Rangers
2002–03	F	Tyler Arnason	Chicago Blackhawks
2002–03	F	Rick Nash	Columbus Blue Jackets
2002–03	F	Henrik Zetterberg	Detroit Red Wings
2002–03	D	Jay Bouwmeester	Florida Panthers
2002–03	D	**Barret Jackman**	St. Louis Blues
2002–03	G	Sebastien Caron	Pittsburgh Penguins
2003–04	F	Trent Hunter	New York Islanders
2003–04	F	Ryan Malone	Pittsburgh Penguins
2003–04	F	Michael Ryder	Montreal Canadiens
2003–04	D	John-Michael Liles	Colorado Avalanche
2003–04	D	Joni Pitkanen	Philadelphia Flyers
2003–04	G	**Andrew Raycroft**	Boston Bruins
2004–05	Season cancelled due to the 2004–05 NHL lockout		
2005–06	F	Brad Boyes	Boston Bruins
2005–06	F	Sidney Crosby^	Pittsburgh Penguins
2005–06	F	**Alexander Ovechkin**^	Washington Capitals
2005–06	D	Andrej Meszaros	Ottawa Senators
2005–06	D	Dion Phaneuf	Calgary Flames
2005–06	G	Henrik Lundqvist*	New York Rangers
2006–07	F	**Evgeni Malkin**^	Pittsburgh Penguins
2006–07	F	Jordan Staal^	Pittsburgh Penguins
2006–07	F	Paul Stastny	Colorado Avalanche
2006–07	D	Matt Carle	San Jose Sharks
2006–07	D	Marc-Edouard Vlasic^{†}	San Jose Sharks
2006–07	G	Mike Smith	Dallas Stars
2007–08	F	Nicklas Backstrom^{†}	Washington Capitals
2007–08	F	**Patrick Kane**^	Chicago Blackhawks
2007–08	F	Jonathan Toews^{†}	Chicago Blackhawks
2007–08	D	Tobias Enstrom	Atlanta Thrashers
2007–08	D	Tom Gilbert	Edmonton Oilers
2007–08	G	Carey Price*	Montreal Canadiens
2008–09	F	Patrik Berglund	St. Louis Blues
2008–09	F	Bobby Ryan	Anaheim Ducks
2008–09	F	Kris Versteeg	Chicago Blackhawks
2008–09	D	Drew Doughty^	Los Angeles Kings
2008–09	D	Luke Schenn^	Toronto Maple Leafs
2008–09	G	**Steve Mason**	Columbus Blue Jackets
2009–10	F	Niclas Bergfors	New Jersey Devils; Atlanta Thrashers
2009–10	F	Matt Duchene^	Colorado Avalanche
2009–10	F	John Tavares^	New York Islanders
2009–10	D	Michael Del Zotto	New York Rangers
2009–10	D	**Tyler Myers**^	Buffalo Sabres
2009–10	G	Jimmy Howard	Detroit Red Wings
2010–11	F	Logan Couture^{†}	San Jose Sharks
2010–11	F	Michael Grabner	New York Islanders
2010–11	F	**Jeff Skinner**^	Carolina Hurricanes
2010–11	D	John Carlson^	Washington Capitals
2010–11	D	P. K. Subban	Montreal Canadiens
2010–11	G	Corey Crawford	Chicago Blackhawks
2011–12	F	Adam Henrique^	New Jersey Devils
2011–12	F	**Gabriel Landeskog**^	Colorado Avalanche
2011–12	F	Ryan Nugent-Hopkins^	Edmonton Oilers
2011–12	D	Justin Faulk^	Carolina Hurricanes
2011–12	D	Jake Gardiner	Toronto Maple Leafs
2011–12	G	Jhonas Enroth^{†}	Buffalo Sabres
2012–13	F	Brendan Gallagher^	Montreal Canadiens
2012–13	F	**Jonathan Huberdeau**^	Florida Panthers
2012–13	F	Brandon Saad^	Chicago Blackhawks
2012–13	D	Jonas Brodin^	Minnesota Wild
2012–13	D	Justin Schultz^{†}	Edmonton Oilers
2012–13	G	Jake Allen^	St. Louis Blues
2013–14	F	Tyler Johnson^{†}	Tampa Bay Lightning
2013–14	F	**Nathan MacKinnon**^	Colorado Avalanche
2013–14	F	Ondrej Palat^	Tampa Bay Lightning
2013–14	D	Torey Krug^{†}	Boston Bruins
2013–14	D	Hampus Lindholm^	Anaheim Ducks
2013–14	G	Frederik Andersen^	Anaheim Ducks
2014–15	F	Filip Forsberg^	Nashville Predators
2014–15	F	Johnny Gaudreau^{†}	Calgary Flames
2014–15	F	Mark Stone^	Ottawa Senators
2014–15	D	**Aaron Ekblad**^	Florida Panthers
2014–15	D	John Klingberg^	Dallas Stars
2014–15	G	Jake Allen^ (2)	St. Louis Blues
2015–16	F	Jack Eichel^	Buffalo Sabres
2015–16	F	Connor McDavid^	Edmonton Oilers
2015–16	F	**Artemi Panarin**^	Chicago Blackhawks
2015–16	D	Shayne Gostisbehere^	Philadelphia Flyers
2015–16	D	Colton Parayko^	St. Louis Blues
2015–16	G	John Gibson^	Anaheim Ducks
2016–17	F	Patrik Laine^	Winnipeg Jets
2016–17	F	Mitch Marner^	Toronto Maple Leafs
2016–17	F	**Auston Matthews**^	Toronto Maple Leafs
2016–17	D	Brady Skjei^	New York Rangers
2016–17	D	Zach Werenski^	Columbus Blue Jackets
2016–17	G	Matt Murray^	Pittsburgh Penguins
2017–18	F	**Mathew Barzal**^	New York Islanders
2017–18	F	Brock Boeser^	Vancouver Canucks
2017–18	F	Clayton Keller^	Arizona Coyotes
2017–18	D	Will Butcher^{†}	New Jersey Devils
2017–18	D	Charlie McAvoy^	Boston Bruins
2017–18	G	Juuse Saros^	Nashville Predators
2018–19	F	Anthony Cirelli^	Tampa Bay Lightning
2018–19	F	**Elias Pettersson**^	Vancouver Canucks
2018–19	F	Brady Tkachuk^	Ottawa Senators
2018–19	D	Rasmus Dahlin^	Buffalo Sabres
2018–19	D	Miro Heiskanen^	Dallas Stars
2018–19	G	Jordan Binnington^	St. Louis Blues
2019–20	F	Dominik Kubalik^{†}	Chicago Blackhawks
2019–20	F	Victor Olofsson^	Buffalo Sabres
2019–20	F	Nick Suzuki^	Montreal Canadiens
2019–20	D	Quinn Hughes^	Vancouver Canucks
2019–20	D	**Cale Makar**^	Colorado Avalanche
2019–20	G	Elvis Merzlikins^	Columbus Blue Jackets
2020–21	F	**Kirill Kaprizov**^	Minnesota Wild
2020–21	F	Josh Norris^	Ottawa Senators
2020–21	F	Jason Robertson^	Dallas Stars
2020–21	D	K'Andre Miller^	New York Rangers
2020–21	D	Ty Smith^{†}	New Jersey Devils
2020–21	G	Alex Nedeljkovic^	Carolina Hurricanes
2021–22	F	Michael Bunting^	Toronto Maple Leafs
2021–22	F	Lucas Raymond^	Detroit Red Wings
2021–22	F	Trevor Zegras^	Anaheim Ducks
2021–22	D	Alexandre Carrier^	Nashville Predators
2021–22	D	**Moritz Seider**^	Detroit Red Wings
2021–22	G	Jeremy Swayman^	Boston Bruins
2022–23	F	**Matty Beniers**^	Seattle Kraken
2022–23	F	Wyatt Johnston^	Dallas Stars
2022–23	F	Matias Maccelli^	Arizona Coyotes
2022–23	D	Owen Power^	Buffalo Sabres
2022–23	D	Jake Sanderson^	Ottawa Senators
2022–23	G	Stuart Skinner^	Edmonton Oilers
2023–24	F	**Connor Bedard**^	Chicago Blackhawks
2023–24	F	Logan Cooley^	Arizona Coyotes
2023–24	F	Marco Rossi^	Minnesota Wild
2023–24	D	Brock Faber^	Minnesota Wild
2023–24	D	Luke Hughes^	New Jersey Devils
2023–24	G	Pyotr Kochetkov^	Carolina Hurricanes
2024–25	F	Macklin Celebrini^	San Jose Sharks
2024–25	F	Cutter Gauthier^	Anaheim Ducks
2024–25	F	Matvei Michkov^	Philadelphia Flyers
2024–25	D	**Lane Hutson**^	Montreal Canadiens
2024–25	D	Denton Mateychuk^	Columbus Blue Jackets
2024–25	G	Dustin Wolf^	Calgary Flames
2025–26	F	Ivan Demidov^	Montreal Canadiens
2025–26	F	Beckett Sennecke^	Anaheim Ducks
2025–26	F	Jimmy Snuggerud^	St. Louis Blues
2025–26	D	Alexander Nikishin^	Carolina Hurricanes
2025–26	D	**Matthew Schaefer**^	New York Islanders
2025–26	G	Jakub Dobes^	Montreal Canadiens

== Accomplishments ==
- Team with the most players (one year): 1986–87 Los Angeles Kings (Jimmy Carson, Steve Duchesne, Luc Robitaille)
- Team with the most players (all-time): 15 (Montreal Canadiens)
- Players with the most nominations (all-time): 2; Jamie Storr (1997–98 and 1998–99) and Jake Allen (2012–13 and 2014–15)
- Stanley Cup winner as a member of the All-Rookie Team:
  - 1985–86: Patrick Roy, Kjell Dahlin
  - 1989–90: Geoff Smith
  - 1990–91: Jaromir Jagr
  - 1999–2000: Scott Gomez
  - 2012–13: Brandon Saad
  - 2016–17: Matt Murray
  - 2018–19: Jordan Binnington
  - 2025–26: Alexander Nikishin
- Oldest player (all-time): Sergei Makarov; 31 years old, 1989–90
