= Maxim Beryozkin =

Russian ice hockey player

- Born: 12 October 2001 (age 25) Chita, Russia
- Height: 6 ft 4 in (193 cm)
- Weight: 216 lb (98 kg; 15 st 6 lb)
- Position: Left wing
- Shoots: Right
- KHL team: Lokomotiv Yaroslavl
- NHL draft: 138th overall, 2020; Edmonton Oilers
- Playing career: 2019–present

Maxim Konstantinovich Beryozkin (Russian: Максим Константинович Берёзкин; born 12 October 2001), also known as Maksim Berezkin, is a Russian ice hockey winger currently playing for Lokomotiv Yaroslavl of the KHL. He was selected by the Edmonton Oilers in the 5th round of the 2020 NHL entry draft with the 138th overall pick.

== Awards and honors ==
Award	Year
KHL
Gagarin Cup champion	2025, 2026
