= Miroslav Svoboda =

Miroslav Svoboda may refer to:

- Miroslav Svoboda (football coach), Slovak football coach
- Miroslav Svoboda (ice hockey) (born 1995), Czech ice hockey player
- Miroslav Svoboda (actor) (1910–1988), Czech actor featured in Workers, Let's Go, The World Is Ours and Záhada modrého pokoje
