= Semyon Vyazovoy =

Russian ice hockey player (born 2003)

- Born: February 26, 2003 (age 23) Ufa, Russia
- Height: 6 ft 3 in (191 cm)
- Weight: 181 lb (82 kg; 12 st 13 lb)
- Position: Goaltender
- Shoots: Left
- KHL team: Salavat Yulaev Ufa
- NHL draft: 163rd overall, 2021; Seattle Kraken

Semyon Vyazovoy (Семён Вязовой, born February 26, 2003) is a Russian professional ice hockey goaltender for Salavat Yulaev Ufa of the Kontinental Hockey League (KHL). He was drafted in the sixth round, 163rd overall by the Seattle Kraken in the 2021 NHL entry draft.

== Playing career ==
Vyazovoy was born in Ufa and developed in the academy of his hometown club HC Salavat Yulaev. He played junior hockey for Tolpar Ufa, Salavat Yulaev's farm club in the Junior Hockey League (MHL). He was then promoted to Toros Neftekamsk, Salavat Yulaev's All-Russian Hockey League (VHL) affiliate. He was drafted in the sixth round, 163rd overall, by the Seattle Kraken in 2021. In 2022, he was selected for the MHL's all-star game. Vyazovoy made his KHL debut on December 29, 2023 with a 6–4 road victory against HC Sochi.

He began the 2024–25 KHL season as a backup to Alexander Samonov, but played a major role in Salavat Yulaev's bronze medal run. In the regular season, he posted a league-leading .938 save percentage, a GAA of 1.80, second best in the league, and five shutouts in 28 games. In the Gagarin Cup playoffs, he played 9 games with a .923 save percentage and 2.36 GAA. At the end of the season, he was named a finalist for the Alexei Cherepanov Award, KHL's rookie of the year honor. After his rookie season, Vyazovoy signed a two-year contract extension with Salavat Yulaev.

In the 2025–26 KHL season, Vyazovoy secured the starting role in Salavat Yulaev after Samonov demanded a trade. Vyazovoy finished the regular season with a .931 save percentage, 2.19 GAA and three shutouts in 53 games, and the playoffs with a .924 save percentage, 2.36 GAA and one shutout in 9 games and was nominated for KHL's goaltender of the year honors. He also got received first KHL All-Star Game invite. The KHL also recognized his save against Ak Bars Kazan as the best save of the season.

== Career statistics ==
=== Regular season and playoffs ===
			Regular season									Playoffs
Season	Team	League	GP	W	L	OTL	MIN	GA	SO	GAA	SV%	GP	W	L	MIN	GA	SO	GAA	SV%
2020–21	Tolpar Ufa	MHL	26	14	9	1	1454	50	3	2.06	.939	2	0	1	84	7	0	5.04	.837
2021–22	Tolpar Ufa	MHL	41	25	10	3	2310	78	5	2.03	.927	4	1	2	244	11	1	2.71	.911
2022–23	Tolpar Ufa	MHL	20	9	8	3	1103	48	3	2.61	.930	3	2	1	178	5	0	1.69	.953
2022–23	Toros Neftekamsk	VHL	24	14	8	1	1399	53	1	2.27	.920	13	7	6	786	34	0	2.60	.912
2023–24	Toros Neftekamsk	VHL	37	20	13	4	2175	92	3	2.54	.929	5	1	3	533	13	0	3.52	.912
2023–24	Salavat Yulaev Ufa	KHL	2	1	0	1	120	6	0	2.27	.893	-	-	-	-	-	-	-	-
2024–25	Toros Neftekamsk	VHL	8	4	3	1	484	17	3	2.11	.933	-	-	-	-	-	-	-	-
2024–25	Salavat Yulaev Ufa	KHL	28	14	7	1	1402	42	5	2.27	.938	9	4	4	510	20	0	2.36	.923
2025–26	Salavat Yulaev Ufa	KHL	53	27	18	5	3066	109	3	2.13	.931	9	4	5	533	21	1	2.36	.924
KHL totals			83	42	25	7	4586	157	8	2.05	.932	18	8	9	1043	41	1	2.36	.924
