= Alexander Nikishin =

Russian ice hockey player (born 2001)

- Nikishin playing for Russia in 2023
- Born: 2 October 2001 (age 25) Oryol, Russia
- Height: 6 ft 3 in (191 cm)
- Weight: 218 lb (99 kg; 15 st 8 lb)
- Position: Defence
- Shoots: Left
- NHL team Former teams: Carolina Hurricanes; Spartak Moscow; SKA Saint Petersburg
- National team: Russia
- NHL draft: 69th overall, 2020; Carolina Hurricanes
- Playing career: 2019–present

Alexander Alexandrovich Nikishin (Russian: Александр Александрович Никишин; born 2 October 2001) is a Russian professional ice hockey player who is a defenceman for the Carolina Hurricanes of the National Hockey League (NHL). Nikishin won the Stanley Cup with the Hurricanes in 2026.

== Playing career ==
=== KHL ===
Nikishin made his Kontinental Hockey League (KHL) debut for Spartak Moscow during the 2019–20 season. He was drafted by the Carolina Hurricanes in the third round of the 2020 NHL entry draft with the 69th overall pick. Nikishin was expected to sign with the Carolina Hurricanes after his contract expired with SKA Saint Petersburg in the spring of 2025.

Following three seasons in the KHL with Spartak Moscow, Nikishin was traded to SKA Saint Petersburg in exchange for five contracted players and the rights to four further players and an additional 50 million rubles on 31 July 2022. With SKA Saint Petersburg, Nikishin's production improved, and he recorded 55 points in 65 games during the 2022–23 season. He was nominated for the Golden Stick Award, KHL's regular season MVP honor, which was ultimately won by his teammate Dmitri Jaskin, and named to the KHL's Golden Helmet Award all-star team.

Nikishkin was named team captain for the 2023–24 season, and led his team in scoring with 56 points in 67 games, though his season ended with a 4–1 series loss to Avtomobilist Yekaterinburg in the second round of the 2024 Gagarin Cup playoffs.

His production was slightly lower in the 2024–25 season, resulting in 46 points in 61 games, good enough for second in team scoring, behind only Ivan Demidov.

=== NHL ===
Following SKA Saint Petersburg's first round loss to Dynamo Moscow in the 2025 Gagarin Cup playoffs, Nikishin had his KHL contract terminated on 11 April 2025. The same day, he agreed to a two year, entry-level contract with the Carolina Hurricanes and joined the team for the remainder of the 2024–25 season. After the 2025–26 season he was named to the NHL All-Rookie Team.

== International play ==
Medal record

Men's ice hockey

Representing ROC

Olympic Games
Silver medal – second place	2022 Beijing	

Nikishin played for Russia at the 2021 Karjala Tournament and the 2021 Channel One Cup.

On 23 January 2022, Nikishin was named to the roster of the Russian Olympic Committee athletes for the 2022 Winter Olympics.

He played for Russia at the Channel One Cup of 2022, 2023, where he was recognized as the best defenceman of the tournament, and 2024.

== Career statistics ==
=== Regular season and playoffs ===
			Regular season					Playoffs
Season	Team	League	GP	G	A	Pts	PIM	GP	G	A	Pts	PIM
2017–18	CSKA Moscow	RUS U17	2	0	3	3	0	—	—	—	—	—
2018–19	MHC Krylya Sovetov	MHL	62	8	17	25	55	—	—	—	—	—
2019–20	Spartak Moscow	KHL	29	0	3	3	2	3	0	1	1	5
2019–20	MHK Spartak	MHL	6	0	3	3	4	2	0	0	0	2
2019–20	Khimik Voskresensk	VHL	2	0	0	0	0	—	—	—	—	—
2020–21	Spartak Moscow	KHL	20	1	4	5	4	4	0	0	0	2
2020–21	MHK Spartak	MHL	1	0	0	0	2	2	1	1	2	2
2020–21	Khimik Voskresensk	VHL	3	0	3	3	0	2	0	0	0	0
2021–22	Spartak Moscow	KHL	46	8	4	12	39	3	1	1	2	0
2021–22	Khimik Voskresensk	VHL	—	—	—	—	—	3	0	2	2	2
2022–23	SKA Saint Petersburg	KHL	65	11	44	55	50	16	4	4	8	10
2023–24	SKA Saint Petersburg	KHL	67	17	39	56	39	5	1	0	1	4
2024–25	SKA Saint Petersburg	KHL	61	17	29	46	32	4	2	1	3	2
2024–25	Carolina Hurricanes	NHL	—	—	—	—	—	4	0	1	1	6
2025–26	Carolina Hurricanes	NHL	81	11	22	33	33	17	0	1	1	2
KHL totals			288	54	123	177	166	35	8	7	15	23
NHL totals			81	11	22	33	33	21	0	2	2	8

=== International ===
Year	Team	Event	Result	GP	G	A	Pts	PIM
2022	ROC	OG	2nd place, silver medalist(s)	6	0	0	0	4
Senior totals				6	0	0	0	4

== Awards and honours ==
Award	Year	Ref
NHL
NHL All-Rookie Team	2026	
Stanley Cup champion	2026	
