= 2025–26 KHL season =

- League: Kontinental Hockey League
- Sport: Ice hockey
- Duration: 5 September 2025 – 20 March 2026 (regular season)
- Games: 68
- Teams: 22
- TV partner(s): KHL TV, KHL Prime Match TV (Russia); Qazsport (Kazakhstan); Belarus 5 (Belarus); Kinopoisk (streaming partner); Regional broadcasters (local team games only) TNV Tatarstan (Ak Bars Kazan); BST (Salavat Yulaev Ufa); Channel 12 (Avangard Omsk); TV-IN (Metallurg Magnitogorsk); Channel 78 (SKA Saint-Petersburg); Pervy Yaroslavsky (Lokomotiv Yaroslavl); NN 24 (Torpedo Nizhny Novgorod); Guberniya (Amur Khabarovsk); OTV (Traktor Chelyabinsk); OTV Primorye (Admiral Vladivostok); OTS (Sibir Novosibirsk)

Regular season
- Continental Cup winner: Metallurg Magnitogorsk

Playoffs
- Playoffs MVP: Daniil Isayev (Yaroslavl)
- Finals champions: Lokomotiv Yaroslavl
- Runners-up: Ak Bars Kazan

KHL seasons
- ← 2024–25 2026–27 →

The 2025–26 KHL season was the 18th season of the Kontinental Hockey League. 22 teams competed in 68 regular season games, with 182 playing days, between 5 September 2025 and 20 March 2026.

== Season changes ==
For the 2025–26 season, the competition was reduced to 22 teams, following the announcement that inaugural member HC Vityaz were initially withdrawing from the league for the season due to financial constraints, on 24 June 2025. After an emergency league meeting with the board of directors, it was announced that Vityaz would not be eligible for a return to the competition until 2030. As a result of Vityaz's exit, and in order for conference balance, Lada Togliatti who played in the Kharlamov Division of the Eastern Conference were moved to the Bobrov Division of the Western Conference.

On 7 August 2025, with Kunlun Red Star undergoing a change of ownership, the club announced they would rebrand as the Shanghai Dragons, and relocate from Beijing to Shanghai, while still being initially based in St. Petersburg, Russia, and would retain their place in the Tarasov Division.

As a result of Vityaz's withdrawal the regular season was reduced to 748 games for 182 gamedays, with each club played 68 regular season engagements. Since the Russian and Belarusian teams will not be participating in the Olympic Games, there will only be a break in February, from February 6th to 9th, for the KHL 2026 Fonbet All-Star Game. The first break in December will be between December 8th and 15th for the Channel One Cup.

The league's salary floor has been raised to 475 million rubles. The salary cap stayed at 900 million rubles, excluding certain bonuses.

In addition, in shootouts teams would now have three attempts instead of five.

The league continued the previous two seasons playoff format for the Gagarin Cup playoffs with a cross playoff system in which teams participate in the Conference Quarterfinals before a cross conference switch and re-seeding take place from the second round.

== Teams ==
The 22 teams were split into four divisions: the Bobrov Division and the Tarasov Division as part of the Western Conference, with the Kharlamov Division and the Chernyshev Division as part of the Eastern Conference.

Western Conference		Eastern Conference	
Bobrov Division	Tarasov Division	Kharlamov Division	Chernyshev Division
(Russia) Lada Togliatti	(Russia) CSKA Moscow	(Russia) Ak Bars Kazan	(Russia) Admiral Vladivostok
(Russia) SKA Saint Petersburg	(Belarus) Dinamo Minsk	(Russia) Avtomobilist Yekaterinburg	(Russia) Amur Khabarovsk
(Russia) HC Sochi	(Russia) Dynamo Moscow	(Russia) Metallurg Magnitogorsk	(Russia) Avangard Omsk
(Russia) Spartak Moscow	(Russia) Lokomotiv Yaroslavl	(Russia) Neftekhimik Nizhnekamsk	(Kazakhstan) Barys Astana
(Russia) Torpedo Nizhny Novgorod	(Russia) Severstal Cherepovets	(Russia) Traktor Chelyabinsk	(Russia) Salavat Yulaev Ufa
	(China) Shanghai Dragons		(Russia) Sibir Novosibirsk

Each team will feature in 68 games in which every team will play each other once at home. This results in 21 home and 21 away games. In addition, there will be 10 home and 10 away games against teams from the same conference, plus six special games per team. Points were awarded for each game, where two points were awarded for all victories, regardless of whether it was in regulation time, in overtime or after game-winning shots. One point was awarded for losing in overtime or game-winning shots, and zero points for losing in regulation time.

== Opening Cup ==
The season started on 5 September 2025 with the Opening Cup. The 2025–26 Opening Cup was contested between Lokomotiv Yaroslavl, the 2024–25 Gagarin Cup Champions and Traktor Chelyabinsk, the 2024–25 Gagarin Cup runner-up. Lokomotiv won the game 2-1 in the shootout.

September 5, 2025	Lokomotiv Yaroslavl	2–1 SO (0–0, 1–0, 0–1, 0–0, 1–0)	Traktor Chelyabinsk	Arena 2000, Yaroslavl, Russia; Attendance: 8,115

Game reference
Daniil Isayev	Goalies	Chris Driedger	Referees: Viktor Gashilov; Denis Naumov; Linesmen: Dmitry Shishlo; Dmitry Sivov
Egor Surin – 39:43 / Goals / 52:10 – Pierrick Dube (Mikhail Grigorenko, Joshua Leivo)			Referees: Viktor Gashilov; Denis Naumov; Linesmen: Dmitry Shishlo; Dmitry Sivov
Alexander Radulov; Byron Froese (miss); Maxim Beryozkin	Shootout	(miss) Pierrick Dube; Joshua Leivo; (miss) Mikhail Grigorenko	Referees: Viktor Gashilov; Denis Naumov; Linesmen: Dmitry Shishlo; Dmitry Sivov
12 min	Penalties	16 min	Referees: Viktor Gashilov; Denis Naumov; Linesmen: Dmitry Shishlo; Dmitry Sivov
35	Shots	28	Referees: Viktor Gashilov; Denis Naumov; Linesmen: Dmitry Shishlo; Dmitry Sivov

== Standings ==
=== Western Conference ===
Pos	Team	Pld	W	OTW	OTL	L	GF	GA	GD	Pts	Qualification
1	Lokomotiv Yaroslavl (O, Q, T, Y)	68	34	12	6	16	185	135	+50	98	Conference winner and Home advantage in Conference Quarterfinals of Gagarin Cup Playoffs
2	Dinamo Minsk (Q)	68	33	6	10	19	247	173	+74	88	Home advantage in Conference Quarterfinals of Gagarin Cup Playoffs
3	Severstal Cherepovets (Q)	68	29	11	6	22	197	185	+12	86	Home advantage in Conference Quarterfinals of Gagarin Cup Playoffs
4	CSKA Moscow (Q)	68	33	5	8	22	162	144	+18	84	Home advantage in Conference Quarterfinals of Gagarin Cup Playoffs
5	SKA Saint Petersburg (B, Q)	68	28	9	7	24	197	170	+27	81	Advance to Gagarin Cup Playoffs
6	Torpedo Nizhny Novgorod (Q)	68	27	10	7	24	191	191	0	81	Advance to Gagarin Cup Playoffs
7	Dynamo Moscow (Q)	68	26	12	5	25	188	174	+14	81	Advance to Gagarin Cup Playoffs
8	Spartak Moscow (Q)	68	29	6	9	24	204	201	+3	79	Advance to Gagarin Cup Playoffs
9	Shanghai Dragons	68	16	5	12	35	166	238	−72	54	
10	Lada Togliatti	68	17	3	7	41	157	240	−83	47	
11	HC Sochi	68	16	2	8	42	139	233	−94	44	

Source: KHL
Rules for classification: 1) points; 2) games won in regulation time; 3) games won in overtime; 4) games won in shootouts; 5) goal difference; 6) number of goals scored; 7) drawing of lots.
(B) Won Bobrov Division; (O) Won Opening Cup; (Q) Qualified for Gagarin cup playoffs; (T) Won Tarasov Division; (Y) Won Conference

=== Eastern Conference ===
Pos	Team	Pld	W	OTW	OTL	L	GF	GA	GD	Pts	Qualification
1	Metallurg Magnitogorsk (K, Q, Y, Z)	68	37	12	7	12	252	184	+68	105	Conference winner and Home advantage in Conference Quarterfinals of Gagarin Cup Playoffs
2	Avangard Omsk (H, Q)	68	36	11	5	16	228	159	+69	99	Home advantage in Conference Quarterfinals of Gagarin Cup Playoffs
3	Ak Bars Kazan (Q)	68	38	5	8	17	212	169	+43	94	Home advantage in Conference Quarterfinals of Gagarin Cup Playoffs
4	Avtomobilist Yekaterinburg (Q)	68	32	8	4	24	206	164	+42	84	Home advantage in Conference Quarterfinals of Gagarin Cup Playoffs
5	Salavat Yulaev Ufa (Q)	68	27	9	6	26	180	171	+9	78	Advance to Gagarin Cup Playoffs
6	Traktor Chelyabinsk (Q)	68	28	5	9	26	205	195	+10	75	Advance to Gagarin Cup Playoffs
7	Neftekhimik Nizhnekamsk (Q)	68	25	9	3	31	170	188	−18	71	Advance to Gagarin Cup Playoffs
8	Sibir Novosibirsk (Q)	68	15	15	9	29	160	195	−35	69	Advance to Gagarin Cup Playoffs
9	Amur Khabarovsk	68	22	4	8	34	157	192	−35	60	
10	Barys Astana	68	16	5	12	35	154	208	−54	54	
11	Admiral Vladivostok	68	16	4	12	36	161	209	−48	52	

Source: KHL
Rules for classification: 1) points; 2) games won in regulation time; 3) games won in overtime; 4) games won in shootouts; 5) goal difference; 6) number of goals
(H) Won Chernyshev Division; (K) Won Kharlamov Division; (Q) Qualified for Gagarin cup playoffs; (Y) Won Conference; (Z) Won Continental Cup

=== Continental Cup ===
Pos	Team	Pld	W	OTW	OTL	L	GF	GA	GD	Pts	Qualification
1	Metallurg Magnitogorsk (K, Q, Y, Z)	68	37	12	7	12	252	184	+68	105	Continental Cup winner and first overall seed in Gagarin Cup Playoffs
2	Avangard Omsk (H, Q)	68	36	11	5	16	228	159	+69	99	
3	Lokomotiv Yaroslavl (O, Q, T, Y)	68	34	12	6	16	185	135	+50	98	
4	Ak Bars Kazan (Q)	68	38	5	8	17	212	169	+43	94	
5	Dinamo Minsk (Q)	68	33	6	10	19	247	173	+74	88	
6	Severstal Cherepovets (Q)	68	29	11	6	22	197	185	+12	86	
7	CSKA Moscow (Q)	68	33	5	8	22	162	144	+18	84	
8	Avtomobilist Yekaterinburg (Q)	68	32	8	4	24	206	164	+42	84	
9	SKA Saint Petersburg (B, Q)	68	28	9	7	24	197	170	+27	81	
10	Torpedo Nizhny Novgorod (Q)	68	27	10	7	24	191	191	0	81	
11	Dynamo Moscow (Q)	68	26	12	5	25	188	174	+14	81	
12	Spartak Moscow (Q)	68	29	6	9	24	204	201	+3	79	
13	Salavat Yulaev Ufa (Q)	68	27	9	6	26	180	171	+9	78	
14	Traktor Chelyabinsk (Q)	68	28	5	9	26	205	195	+10	75	
15	Neftekhimik Nizhnekamsk (Q)	68	25	9	3	31	170	188	−18	71	
16	Sibir Novosibirsk (Q)	68	15	15	9	29	160	195	−35	69	
17	Amur Khabarovsk	68	22	4	8	34	157	192	−35	60	
18	Barys Astana	68	16	5	12	35	154	208	−54	54	
19	Shanghai Dragons	68	16	5	12	35	166	238	−72	54	
20	Admiral Vladivostok	68	16	4	12	36	161	209	−48	52	
21	Lada Togliatti	68	17	3	7	41	157	240	−83	47	
22	HC Sochi	68	16	2	8	42	139	233	−94	44	

Source: KHL
Rules for classification: 1) points; 2) games won in regulation time; 3) games won in overtime; 4) games won in shootouts; 5) goal difference; 6) number of goals scored; 7) drawing of lots.
(B) Won Bobrov Division; (H) Won Chernyshev Division; (K) Won Kharlamov Division; (O) Won Opening Cup; (Q) Qualified for Gagarin cup playoffs; (T) Won Tarasov Division; (Y) Won Conference; (Z) Won Continental Cup

== Gagarin Cup playoffs ==
The Gagarin Cup playoffs started on 23 March 2026.

=== Bracket ===
Last 16
E1	(Russia) Metallurg Mg	4
E8	(Russia) Sibir	1
E2	(Russia) Avangard	4
E7	(Russia) Neftekhimik	1
E3	(Russia) Ak Bars	4
E6	(Russia) Traktor	1
E4	(Russia) Avtomobilist	2
E5	(Russia) Salavat Yulaev	4
W1	(Russia) Lokomotiv	4
W8	(Russia) Spartak	1
W2	(Belarus) Dinamo Mn	4
W7	(Russia) Dynamo Msk	0
W3	(Russia) Severstal	1
W6	(Russia) Torpedo	4
W4	(Russia) CSKA	4
W5	(Russia) SKA	1

Quarterfinals
E1	(Russia) Metallurg Mg	4
W6	(Russia) Torpedo	1
W2	(Belarus) Dinamo Mn	0
E3	(Russia) Ak Bars	4
W1	(Russia) Lokomotiv	4
E5	(Russia) Salavat Yulaev	0
E2	(Russia) Avangard	4
W4	(Russia) CSKA	1

Semifinals
E1	(Russia) Metallurg Mg	1
E3	(Russia) Ak Bars	4
W1	(Russia) Lokomotiv	4
E2	(Russia) Avangard	3

Gagarin Cup Finals
E3	(Russia) Ak Bars	2
W1	(Russia) Lokomotiv	4

- After the Conference Quarterfinals a conference cross-over and re-seeding commenced
- During the Gagarin Cup Finals the team that finished with higher seed in their conference had home ice (if both teams finished with the same seed the team that earned most points during the regular season had home ice)
- Source: KHL

== Final standings ==
Rank	Team
1	(Russia) Lokomotiv Yaroslavl
2	(Russia) Ak Bars Kazan
3	(Russia) Metallurg Magnitogorsk
4	(Russia) Avangard Omsk
5	(Belarus) Dinamo Minsk
6	(Russia) CSKA Moscow
7	(Russia) Torpedo Nizhny Novgorod
8	(Russia) Salavat Yulaev Ufa
9	(Russia) Severstal Cherepovets
10	(Russia) Avtomobilist Yekaterinburg
11	(Russia) SKA Saint Petersburg
12	(Russia) Dynamo Moscow
13	(Russia) Spartak Moscow
14	(Russia) Traktor Chelyabinsk
15	(Russia) Neftekhimik Nizhnekamsk
16	(Russia) Sibir Novosibirsk
17	(Russia) Amur Khabarovsk
18	(Kazakhstan) Barys Astana
19	(China) Shanghai Dragons
20	(Russia) Admiral Vladivostok
21	(Russia) Lada Togliatti
22	(Russia) HC Sochi

== All-Star Game ==
The 2026 Kontinental Hockey League All-Star Game was hosted at the UMMC Arena in Yekaterinburg on February 7-8, 2026. It used a brand new format with 4 teams: the Ural Stars (players from Avtomobilist Yekaterinburg, Metallurg Magnitogorsk, Salavat Yulaev Ufa and Traktor Chelyabinsk), the World Stars (non-Russian players), the U23 Stars (young players) and the RUS Stars (other selected players).

The RUS Stars won the All-Star Game, defeating the U23 Stars 9-2 in the final. Danil Aimurzin scored five goals in the final and was named the most valuable player.

== Individual achievements ==
=== Scoring records ===
Sam Anas from HC Dinamo Minsk matched the single-season scoring record with 89 (32+57) points in 67 regular season games, matching the total of Nikita Gusev in the 2023-24 KHL season.

Damir Sharipzyanov from Avangard Omsk beat the single-season defenceman scoring record with 67 (23+44) points across 66 regular season games.

Mitchell Miller from Ak Bars Kazan beat the Gagarin Cup Playoffs defenceman scoring record with 23 (7+16) points in 20 games, and was the first defenceman ever to become the top scorer of the KHL playoffs.

Vadim Shipachyov from HC Dinamo Minsk became the first player to score 1000 points in his KHL career with an assist in a January 10 game against Admiral Vladivostok.

=== Golden Helmet Award (All-Star Team) ===
Position	Player	Team
G	Daniil Isayev	Lokomotiv Yaroslavl
D	Mitchell Miller	Ak Bars Kazan
D	Damir Sharipzyanov	Avangard Omsk
F	Sam Anas	HC Dinamo Minsk
F	Konstantin Okulov	Avangard Omsk
F	Alexander Radulov	Lokomotiv Yaroslavl

Source: KHL

=== Alexei Cherepanov Award (Rookie of the Year) ===
Winner: Alexander Zharovsky (Salavat Yulaev Ufa)

Other nominees: Mikhail Fedorov (Metallurg Magnitogorsk), Nikolai Polyakov (SKA Saint-Petersburg)

=== Goaltender of the Year ===
Winner: Nikita Serebryakov (Avangard Omsk)

Other nominees: Semyon Vyazovoy (Salavat Yulaev Ufa), Daniil Isayev (Lokomotiv Yaroslavl)

=== Coach of the Year ===
Winner: Anvar Gatiyatulin (Ak Bars Kazan)

Other nominees: Andrei Razin (Metallurg Magnitogorsk), Viktor Kozlov (Salavat Yulaev Ufa)

== See also ==
- 2025–26 Asia League Ice Hockey season
