= Golden Helmet Award =

- Sport: Ice hockey
- Awarded for: Kontinental Hockey League's best six players by positions.

History
- First award: 1996–97 Russian Superleague season
- Most recent: Ilya Nabokov; Robin Press; Alexander Nikishin; Nikita Gusev; Nikolai Goldobin; Vladimir Tkachyov

The Golden Helmet Award is awarded annually to best six players of the Kontinental Hockey League (KHL): 1 goaltender, 2 defenders and 3 forwards.
