= Konstantin Barulin =

Russian ice hockey goaltender

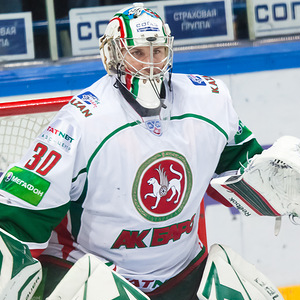
- Born: 4 September 1984 (age 41) Karaganda, Kazakh SSR, Soviet Union
- Height: 6 ft 1 in (185 cm)
- Weight: 203 lb (92 kg; 14 st 7 lb)
- Position: Goaltender
- Catches: Left
- ELH team Former teams: HC Dynamo Pardubice; SKA Saint Petersburg; Spartak Moscow; Khimik Moscow Oblast; CSKA Moscow; Atlant Moscow Oblast; Ak Bars Kazan; Avangard Omsk; HC Sochi; Neftekhimik Nizhnekamsk
- National team: Russia
- NHL draft: 84th overall, 2003; St. Louis Blues
- Playing career: 2002–present

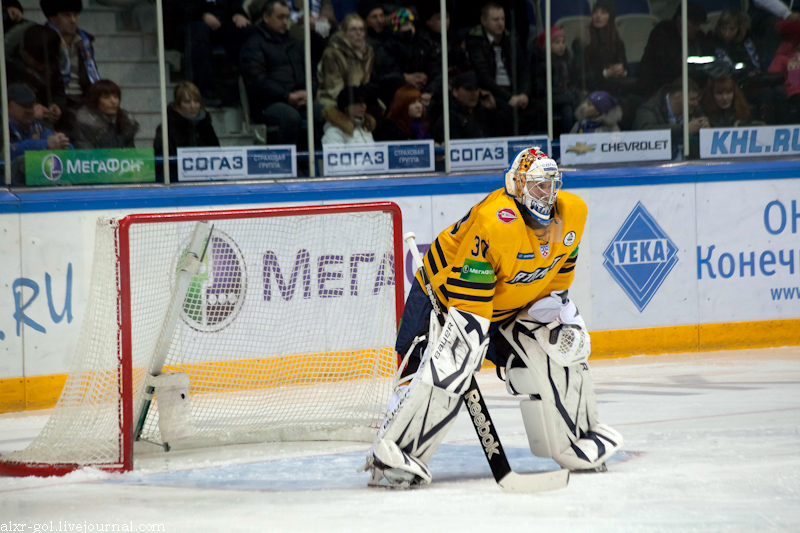
Konstantin Barulin in the Atlant Moscow Oblast net in 2011.

Konstantin Alexandrovich Barulin (Russian: Константи́н Алекса́ндрович Бару́лин, born 4 September 1984) is a Russian professional ice hockey goaltender playing for Borås HC of the HockeyEttan in Sweden. He was born in Karaganda, Kazakh SSR, Soviet Union (now Kazakhstan), but plays internationally for Russia. He was drafted 84th overall by the St. Louis Blues in the 2003 NHL entry draft but remained in Russia and never signed a contract with the Blues.

== Playing career ==
Barulin began his career with Gazovik Tyumen in 2001. He had a brief spell with SKA Saint Petersburg before returning to Gazovik. He went on to have spells at Spartak Moscow and Khimik Moscow Oblast before joining CSKA Moscow for the inaugural KHL season in 2008. On 29 July 2010, after two years with CSKA Barulin returned to Atlant signing as a free agent on a two-year contract. In 2012, he signed a three-year contract with Ak Bars Kazan.

After one season with Avangard Omsk in 2014–15, Barulin left as a free agent to sign an initial one-year deal with HC Sochi of the KHL on 28 May 2015.

Barulin remained as a standout starting goaltender in Sochi for four seasons. Following the 2018–19 season, Barulin left as a free agent to sign a one-year contract with Neftekhimik Nizhnekamsk on 2 May 2019.

During his second year with Neftekhimik in the midst of the 2020–21 season, with the club well out of playoff contention and having collected just 2 wins through 21 games, Barulin left the KHL and signed for the remainder of the season with Czech top flight club, HC Dyanmo Pardubice of the ELH, on 21 January 2021.

== International play ==
Medal record

Ice hockey

Representing Russia

World Championships
Gold medal – first place	2012 Finland	
Silver medal – second place	2015 Czech Republic	
Bronze medal – third place	2007 Russia	

World Junior Championship
Gold medal – first place	2003 Canada	

World U18 Championships
Silver medal – second place	2002 Slovakia	

Barulin represented Russia in the 2011 IIHF World Championship in which he defeated Team Canada 2–1, and in the 2012 IIHF World Championship where he helped team Russia en route to winning the gold medal.

== Career statistics ==
=== Regular season and playoffs ===
			Regular season									Playoffs
Season	Team	League	GP	W	L	T/OT	MIN	GA	SO	GAA	SV%	GP	W	L	MIN	GA	SO	GAA	SV%
2001–02	Gazovik Tyumen	VHL	4	—	—	—	188	15	0	4.72	—	—	—	—	—	—	—	—	—
2002–03	Gazovik Tyumen	VHL	30	—	—	—	1693	47	1	4.51	—	11	—	—	621	—	0	1.87	—
2003–04	Gazovik Tyumen	VHL	11	—	—	—	550	24	—	2.17	—	—	—	—	—	—	—	—	—
2003–04	SKA Saint Petersburg	RSL	1	—	—	—	2	0	—	0.00	—	—	—	—	—	—	—	—	—
2004–05	Gazovik Tyumen	VHL	30	—	—	—	1854	60	6	2.00	—	3	—	—	136	9	0	3.96	—
2005–06	Spartak Moscow	RSL	36	—	—	—	2101	75	2	2.17	.915	2	—	—	104	4	0	2.30	—
2006–07	Khimik Moscow Oblast	RSL	26	—	—	—	1248	48	1	2.16	—	1	—	—	47	3	0	3.76	—
2007–08	Khimik Moscow Oblast	RSL	11	—	—	—	456	29	0	2.77	—	—	—	—	—	—	—	—	—
2008–09	CSKA Moscow	KHL	41	24	15	8	2443	95	2	2.33	.908	2	0	2	100	9	0	5.40	.850
2009–10	CSKA Moscow	KHL	45	19	13	8	2277	80	3	2.11	.919	3	0	3	136	10	0	4.43	.855
2010–11	Atlant Moscow Oblast	KHL	28	13	9	4	1505	48	6	1.91	.925	22	11	10	1286	44	2	2.05	.928
2011–12	Atlant Moscow Oblast	KHL	45	18	16	10	2652	100	5	2.26	.929	12	6	6	694	27	1	2.33	.933
2012–13	Ak Bars Kazan	KHL	43	23	11	9	2551	83	4	1.95	.940	18	11	7	1234	36	2	1.75	.941
2013–14	Ak Bars Kazan	KHL	34	17	10	7	2065	71	5	2.06	.932	2	0	2	87	7	0	4.85	.829
2014–15	Avangard Omsk	KHL	44	23	14	3	2402	83	5	2.07	.923	7	2	4	349	14	0	2.41	.905
2015–16	HC Sochi	KHL	53	24	15	9	2787	103	4	2.22	.926	4	0	4	272	11	0	2.43	.899
2016–17	HC Sochi	KHL	53	23	21	6	2907	110	4	2.27	.925	—	—	—	—	—	—	—	—
2017–18	HC Sochi	KHL	35	14	16	4	1950	79	2	2.43	.920	5	1	4	312	18	0	3.46	.906
2018–19	HC Sochi	KHL	30	15	10	4	1728	61	4	2.12	.923	4	0	2	131	7	0	3.20	.865
2019–20	Neftekhimik Nizhnekamsk	KHL	41	15	18	5	2313	99	1	2.57	.905	4	0	3	217	7	0	1.94	.939
2020–21	Neftekhimik Nizhnekamsk	KHL	21	2	15	1	1131	71	0	3.77	.887	—	—	—	—	—	—	—	—
KHL totals			513	227	178	78	28,712	1,083	45	2.26	.922	83	31	47	4,817	190	5	2.38	.921

=== International ===
Year	Team	Event	Result	GP	W	L	OT	MIN	GA	SO	GAA	SV%
2002	Russia	WJC18	2nd place, silver medalist(s)	3	2	0	0	125	0	2	0.00	1.00
2003	Russia	WJC	1st place, gold medalist(s)	1	1	0	0	60	1	0	1.00	.967
2004	Russia	WJC	5th	4	2	1	1	200	12	0	3.60	.892
2007	Russia	WC	3rd place, bronze medalist(s)	0	—	—	—	—	—	—	—	—
2011	Russia	WC	4th	7	2	4	0	342	16	0	2.80	.908
2012	Russia	WC	1st place, gold medalist(s)	2	2	0	0	120	1	1	0.50	.985
2015	Russia	WC	2nd place, silver medalist(s)	1	0	1	0	60	3	0	3.00	.880

== Awards and honours ==
Award	Year
KHL
All-Star Game	2009, 2011, 2012, 2013, 2014
Best Goaltender Award	2011
Best GAA (1.91)	2011
Playoff MVP	2011
