= Sergei Shirokov =

Russian ice hockey player (born 1986)

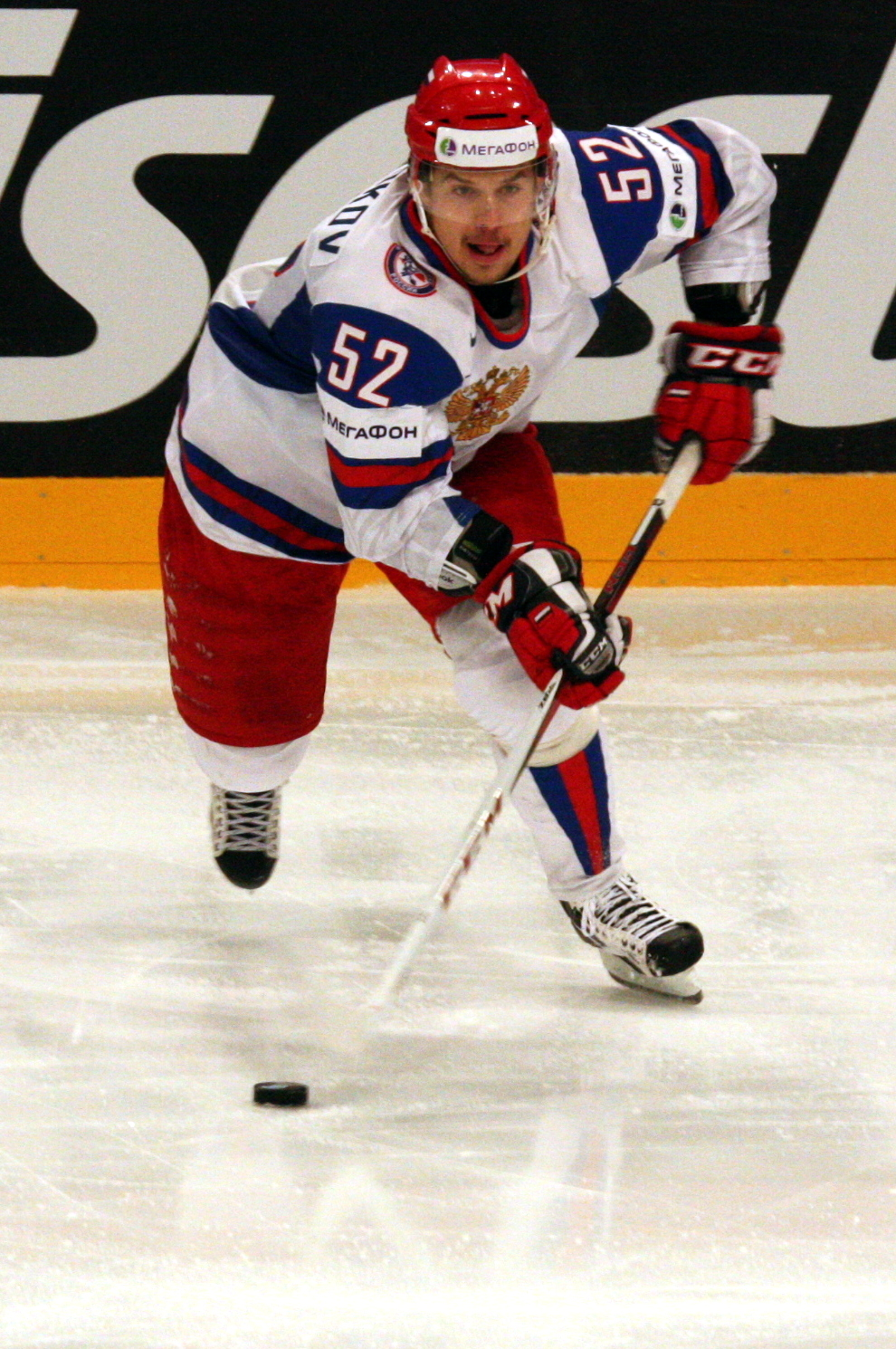
- Shirokov at the 2012 IIHF World Championship
- Born: 10 March 1986 (age 40) Ozyory, Moscow Oblast, Soviet Union
- Height: 5 ft 10 in (178 cm)
- Weight: 200 lb (91 kg; 14 st 4 lb)
- Position: Right wing
- Shot: Right
- Played for: CSKA Moscow; Avangard Omsk; Vancouver Canucks; Manitoba Moose; SKA Saint Petersburg; Spartak Moscow; Avtomobilist Yekaterinburg; Sibir Novosibirsk
- National team: Russia
- NHL draft: 163rd overall, 2006; Vancouver Canucks
- Playing career: 2001–2026

Sergei Sergeyevich Shirokov (Russian: Серге́й Серге́евич Широков, Russian pronunciation: [sʲɪrˈɡʲej sʲɪrˈɡʲejɪvʲɪtɕ ʂɨˈrokəf]; born 10 March 1986) is a former Russian professional ice hockey player. A winger, before signing with Vancouver in 2009 Shirokov played with CSKA Moscow for four seasons in the Russian Superleague and Kontinental Hockey League. He returned to CSKA Moscow in 2011 after two years with the Vancouver Canucks and Manitoba Moose.

== Playing career ==
As a youth, Shirokov played in the 2000 Quebec International Pee-Wee Hockey Tournament with HC CSKA Moscow.

Shirokov first played in the Russian Hockey First League (RUS-3) with HC CSKA Moscow's second-tier team in 2001. He spent several seasons at that level and debuted with CSKA's senior team in the Russian Superleague in 2004–05, going pointless in eight games. The following season, he recorded 14 points playing 39 games in the Superleague. Shirokov was then selected 163rd overall in the sixth round of the 2006 NHL entry draft by the Vancouver Canucks. The sixth-round draft pick was acquired by the Canucks in a trade with the Florida Panthers.

Though selected by an NHL team, Shirokov continued to play in Russia for HC CSKA Moscow and recorded a team-best and career-high 40 points in 56 games for CSKA, who competed in the newly formed Kontinental Hockey League (KHL) in 2008–09. He then turned down a tax-free $500,000 contract to stay in the KHL. Instead, Shirokov left for North America and signed with the Canucks to a two-year, two-way US$1.75 million contract on 17 August 2009. The deal allowed him to make an annual US$875,000 at the NHL level or C$67,500 in the minor leagues.

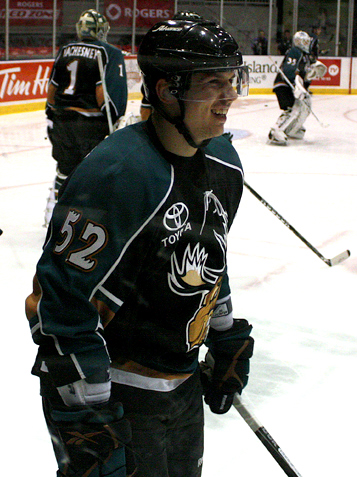
Shirokov playing for the Manitoba Moose

Shirokov made an immediate impression in his first training camp with the Canucks, but suffered a minor setback during the pre-season, missing a week with an injured knee. He recovered in time for the end of the pre-season to lead the team in exhibition scoring with seven points in four games. As a result, Shirokov earned a roster spot for the start of the 2009–10 season, beating out fellow Canucks prospects Cody Hodgson and Michael Grabner.

Shirokov made his NHL debut on 1 October against the Calgary Flames, starting the season on the second line with Ryan Kesler and Mikael Samuelsson, as well as the first power-play unit. However, after going pointless in his first three games before becoming a healthy scratch, he was sent down to the Canucks' American Hockey League (AHL) affiliate, the Manitoba Moose on 8 October. Shirokov scored his first AHL goal in his Moose debut the next day against Drew MacIntyre of the Chicago Wolves, also adding an assist in a 4–1 win. After scoring 10 points in his first 10 games with the Moose, Shirokov was re-called by the Canucks on 25 October after an injury to forward Kyle Wellwood, but was returned to the AHL after three games on 30 October in favour of centre Mario Bliznak. On 30 December, Shirokov was chosen to Team PlanetUSA for the 2010 AHL All-Star Game. At the time of the selection, he was leading the Moose in scoring with 11 goals and 23 points through 33 games. He finished his first campaign in North America with 22 goals and 45 points over 76 games. Among AHL rookies, Shirokov was ninth in points and tied for third in goals. He added two assists in six playoff games as the Moose were eliminated by the Hamilton Bulldogs in the opening round.

Shirokov started the 2010–11 season with the Moose. After a slow start, he was leading the Moose in scoring with 33 points in 39 games, including a team-record 12-game point streak, when he was recalled by the Canucks on 17 January 2011. In his first game back in the NHL the following day, Shirokov scored his first NHL goal against Craig Anderson in a 4–3 overtime loss to the Colorado Avalanche. After two games, he was sent back to the Moose on 23 January. Shirokov was selected as the Moose representative for the 2011 AHL All-Star Game, the second year in a row he would be at the game. He went on to complete the season with a team-leading 22 goals, 36 assists and 58 points in 76 games. As the Moose advanced to the second round of the 2011 playoffs, he led the team in scoring with 7 goals, while adding 3 assists for 10 points over 14 games.

In the off-season Shirokov signed a three-year deal with CSKA Moscow. Then on 9 July 2011, Vancouver traded his rights to the Florida Panthers for the rights to forward Mike Duco. In his first year upon returning to CSKA Moscow, he finished eighth in KHL point scoring and was named to the 2012 KHL All-Star Game. The following season, Shirokov participated in the 2013 KHL All-Star Game. On 5 November 2013, CSKA Moscow traded Shirokov to Avangard Omsk along with Maxim Goncharov in exchange for Alexander Frolov and Stanislav Egorsheva. On 19 December 2015 in exchange for Anton Burdasov and Peter Khokhryakov, he has joined SKA Saint Petersburg.

After spending most of three seasons in SKA Saint Petersburg, Shirokov returned to Avangard as a free agent, securing a two-year deal on May 30, 2018. During the 2019-20 season, Shirokov was signed to a two-year contract extension on 27 December 2019.

Before his extension kicked in, Shirokov was dealt by Avangard Omsk before the 2020–21 season to Spartak Moscow in exchange for Alexander Khokhlachev on 3 May 2020. Shirokov enjoyed a productive two-year tenure with Spartak, serving a team captain in the 2021–22 season, in posting 10 goals and 29 points through 45 regular season games.

On 11 May 2022, having left Spartak as a free agent, Shirokov agreed to a two-year contract to continue in the KHL with Avtomobilist Yekaterinburg.

At the conclusion of his two-year tenure with Avtomobilist, Shirokov extended his career in the KHL by signing as a free agent to a one-year contract with Sibir Novosibirsk on 21 June 2024. Shirokov spent two productive seasons in Sibir, serving a team captain in the 2024–25 and 2025–26 seasons, in posting 25 goals while adding 36 assists for 61 points over 126 games.

On May 28, 2026 during 2025-26 KHL season closing ceremony Shirokov announced his retirement as a hockey player.

== International play ==
Medal record

Ice hockey

Representing Olympic Athletes from Russia

Olympic Games
Gold medal – first place	2018 Pyeongchang	

Representing Russia

World Championships
Gold medal – first place	2012 Finland	
Gold medal – first place	2014 Minsk	
Silver medal – second place	2015 Czech Republic	
Bronze medal – third place	2016 Russia	

World Junior Championships
Silver medal – second place	2005 United States	
Silver medal – second place	2006 Canada	

IIHF World U18 Championship
Gold medal – first place	2004 Minsk	

U-18 Junior World Cup
Silver medal – second place	2003 Slovakia/Czech Republic	

Shirokov made his international debut with Russia at the 2003 U-18 Junior World Cup, earning a silver medal while contributing four points in five games. He continued to play with the national under-18 team, helping Russia to the best records at the 2003 Four Nations and 2004 Five Nations Tournaments. At the 2004 IIHF World U18 Championships, he helped Russia to another gold medal in Minsk, Belarus, defeating the United States 3–2 in the final. Shirokov contributed two goals in six games.

Shirokov made the jump to Russia's under-20 team in September 2004, posting the second-best record with Russia at the Four Nations Tournament. Several months later, he made his first of two appearances at the World Junior Championships. In 2005 he scored eight points in six games at the top under-20 tournament in Grand Forks, North Dakota, helping Russia to a silver medal finish, losing in the final to Canada. In April 2005, Russia hosted the Big Prize Tournament in St. Petersburg, where Shirokov recorded an assist in two games as Russia posted the best record.

The next hockey season, Shirokov competed in the under-20 Four Nations Tournament in September 2005, where Russia finished with the worst record in the tournament. A couple months later, he helped Russia to the best record at the Four Nations Tournament in November. At the 2006 World Junior Championships in British Columbia, Shirokov helped Russia to a second consecutive silver medal, losing once again to Canada in the final. He scored five points in six games.

Shirokov was a member of the gold medal-winning Russian teams at the 2012 IIHF World Championship and 2014 IIHF World Championship tournaments, scoring a combined five goals and seven assists between the two events. He scored a goal and an assist in the gold-medal match against Finland at the 2014 IIHF World Championship. He won a silver medal the following year at the 2015 IIHF World Championship in Czech Republic. He was a member of the Olympic Athletes from Russia team at the 2018 Winter Olympics, and helped them win the gold medal.

== Post-retirement ==
On August 1, 2026, he was appointed head of the scouting department for the Sibir Novosibirsk.

== Career statistics ==
=== Regular season and playoffs ===
			Regular season					Playoffs
Season	Team	League	GP	G	A	Pts	PIM	GP	G	A	Pts	PIM
2001–02	CSKA Moscow 2	RUS 3	18	2	3	5	0	—	—	—	—	—
2002–03	CSKA Moscow 2	RUS 3	2	0	0	0	0	—	—	—	—	—
2003–04	CSKA Moscow 2	RUS 3	66	39	41	80	66	—	—	—	—	—
2004–05	CSKA Moscow	RSL	8	0	0	0	0	—	—	—	—	—
2004–05	CSKA Moscow 2	RUS 3	25	16	13	29	47	—	—	—	—	—
2005–06	CSKA Moscow	RSL	39	7	7	14	26	4	0	0	0	0
2006–07	CSKA Moscow	RSL	52	16	19	35	36	12	4	6	10	4
2007–08	CSKA Moscow	RSL	57	12	21	33	28	6	0	3	3	4
2008–09	CSKA Moscow	KHL	56	17	23	40	36	8	1	3	4	4
2009–10	Vancouver Canucks	NHL	6	0	0	0	2	—	—	—	—	—
2009–10	Manitoba Moose	AHL	76	22	23	45	32	6	0	2	2	4
2010–11	Vancouver Canucks	NHL	2	1	0	1	0	—	—	—	—	—
2010–11	Manitoba Moose	AHL	76	22	36	58	51	14	7	3	10	4
2011–12	CSKA Moscow	KHL	53	18	29	47	26	5	1	0	1	2
2012–13	CSKA Moscow	KHL	33	5	8	13	22	9	1	2	3	12
2013–14	CSKA Moscow	KHL	25	4	9	13	6	—	—	—	—	—
2013–14	Avangard Omsk	KHL	29	6	14	20	29	—	—	—	—	—
2014–15	Avangard Omsk	KHL	33	22	12	34	26	12	2	2	4	2
2015–16	Avangard Omsk	KHL	42	12	11	23	20	—	—	—	—	—
2015–16	SKA Saint Petersburg	KHL	17	1	9	10	8	15	2	1	3	16
2016–17	SKA Saint Petersburg	KHL	42	11	12	23	18	16	2	8	10	18
2017–18	SKA Saint Petersburg	KHL	49	19	22	41	16	9	1	3	4	0
2018–19	Avangard Omsk	KHL	61	18	23	41	18	19	6	3	9	14
2019–20	Avangard Omsk	KHL	39	10	12	22	22	5	0	2	2	6
2020–21	Spartak Moscow	KHL	59	22	20	42	19	4	0	1	1	0
2021–22	Spartak Moscow	KHL	45	10	19	29	14	5	1	1	2	0
2022–23	Avtomobilist Yekaterinburg	KHL	45	18	16	34	38	7	3	5	8	0
2023–24	Avtomobilist Yekaterinburg	KHL	57	11	16	27	28	12	2	3	5	8
2024–25	Sibir Novosibirsk	KHL	62	19	20	39	18	6	0	4	4	16
2025–26	Sibir Novosibirsk	KHL	56	6	12	18	12	2	0	0	0	7
RSL totals			156	35	47	82	90	22	4	9	13	8
KHL totals			803	229	287	516	376	134	22	38	60	98
NHL totals			8	1	0	1	2	—	—	—	—	—

- All statistics taken from NHL.com

=== International ===
Year	Team	Event	Result	GP	G	A	Pts	PIM
2004	Russia	WJC18	1st place, gold medalist(s)	6	2	0	2	6
2005	Russia	WJC	2nd place, silver medalist(s)	6	4	4	8	0
2006	Russia	WJC	2nd place, silver medalist(s)	6	3	2	5	8
2012	Russia	WC	1st place, gold medalist(s)	10	1	5	6	2
2014	Russia	WC	1st place, gold medalist(s)	10	4	2	6	2
2015	Russia	WC	2nd place, silver medalist(s)	9	2	0	2	2
2016	Russia	WC	3rd place, bronze medalist(s)	10	3	1	4	2
2018	OAR	OG	1st place, gold medalist(s)	6	0	2	2	2
Junior totals				18	9	6	15	14
Senior totals				45	10	10	20	10

- All statistics taken from Eliteprospects.com

== Awards and honors ==
Award	Year
KHL
All-Star Game	2012, 2013
Gagarin Cup	2017
AHL
All-Star Game	2010, 2011
