= 2011 Kontinental Hockey League All-Star Game =

All-Star game for the 2010–11 season of the Kontinental Hockey League

2011 KHL All-Star Game
	1	2	3	Total
Team Jágr	5	4	9	18
Team Yashin	5	7	4	16
- Date: 5 February 2011
- Arena: Ice Palace
- City: Saint Petersburg, Russia
- MVP: Sergei Mozyakin
- Attendance: 10,127

The 2011 Kontinental Hockey League All-Star Game was the All-Star game for the 2010–11 season of the Kontinental Hockey League (KHL). It took place on 5 February 2011 at the Ice Palace in Saint Petersburg, Russia. Although the captains of the all-star teams remained the same as the previous years, with Team Jágr playing against Team Yashin, under the new format Team Jagr is a team made up of Eastern Conference players (regardless of whether they are Russian or not) while Team Yashin is a team made up of Western Conference players.

== Rosters ==
	Team Jágr (East)	Team Yashin (West)
Coach:	(Russia) Zinetula Bilyaletdinov (Ak Bars Kazan)	(Latvia) Oļegs Znaroks (Dynamo Moscow)
Assistant Coaches:	(Finland) Kari Heikkilä (Metallurg Magnitogorsk)	(Czech Republic) Vladimír Vůjtek (Lokomotiv Yaroslavl)
Starters:	(Czech Republic) – F Jaromír Jágr (Avangard Omsk) (C) (Russia) – F Alexander Radulov (Salavat Yulaev Ufa) (Czech Republic) – F Roman Červenka (Avangard Omsk) (Russia) – D Ilya Nikulin (Ak Bars Kazan) (Czech Republic) – D Martin Škoula (Avangard Omsk) (Russia) – G Mikhail Biryukov (Yugra Khanty-Mansiysk)	(Russia) – F Alexei Yashin (SKA Saint Petersburg) (C) (Russia) – F Maxim Sushinski (SKA Saint Petersburg) (Russia) – F Sergei Mozyakin (Atlant Moscow) (Latvia) – D Sandis Ozoliņš (Dinamo Riga) (Russia) – D Alexander Guskov (Lokomotiv Yaroslavl) (Czech Republic) – G Dominik Hašek (Spartak Moscow)
Reserves:	(Russia) – F Aleksey Morozov (Ak Bars Kazan) (Norway) – F Patrick Thoresen (Salavat Yulaev Ufa) (Czech Republic) – F Lukáš Kašpar (Barys Astana) (Russia) – F Evgeny Kuznetsov (Traktor Chelyabinsk) (Finland) – F Petri Kontiola (Metallurg Magnitogorsk) (Russia) – F Sergei Fedorov (Metallurg Magnitogorsk) (Canada) – D Kevin Dallman (Barys Astana) (Finland) – D Janne Niskala (Metallurg Magnitogorsk) (Russia) – D Konstantin Korneyev (Ak Bars Kazan) (Russia) – D Denis Kulyash (Avangard Omsk) (Sweden) – G Stefan Liv (Sibir Novosibirsk)	(Sweden) – F Mattias Weinhandl (SKA Saint Petersburg) (Russia) – F Maxim Afinogenov (SKA Saint Petersburg) (Czech Republic) – F Josef Vašíček (Lokomotiv Yaroslavl) (Latvia) – F Lauris Dārziņš (Dinamo Riga) (Canada) – F Chris Simon (Dynamo Moscow) (Finland) – F Leo Komarov (Dynamo Moscow) (Russia) – D Denis Grebeshkov (SKA Saint Petersburg) (Czech Republic) – D Karel Rachůnek (Lokomotiv Yaroslavl) (Slovakia) – D Peter Podhradský (Dinamo Minsk) (Russia) – D Maxim Solovyev (Dynamo Moscow) (Russia) – G Konstantin Barulin (Atlant Moscow Oblast)

== See also ==
- 2010–11 KHL season
- Kontinental Hockey League All-Star Game
