= 2010 Kontinental Hockey League All-Star Game =

2010 ice hockey game

2010 KHL All-Star Game
	1	2	3	Total
Team Jágr	4	3	4	11
Team Yashin	1	5	2	8
- Date: 30 January 2010
- Arena: Minsk-Arena
- City: Minsk, Belarus
- Attendance: 15,000

The 2010 Kontinental Hockey League All-Star Game was the All-Star game for the 2009–10 Kontinental Hockey League (KHL) season. It took place on 30 January 2010, at the new Minsk-Arena in Minsk, Belarus. As in the previous year, Team Jágr won against Team Yashin, this time with a score of 11–8.

== Nominations ==
As in the previous year, the format for the game was "Team Yashin" (Russia) vs. "Team Jágr" (World). The teams were named after players who are highly recognized in the sport worldwide and in particular in their respective countries. The participating players were nominated by the public, by the media, and by the KHL.

=== Skills Competition Winners ===
- The Fastest Skater – Denis Parshin
- Shootout Skill – Shootout Winner Marcel Hossa; Best Shootout – Jozef Stümpel
- Long Range Shot – Dmitri Kalinin
- Zigzag Team Relay – Team Yashin
- Accurate Shooting – Aleksey Morozov
- Speed Relay – Team Yashin
- Hardest shot – Karel Rachůnek

== Rosters ==
	Team Jágr (World)	Team Yashin (Russia)
Coach:	(United States) Barry Smith (SKA Saint Petersburg)	Andrei Khomutov (Dynamo Moscow)
Assistant Coaches:	(Finland) Kari Heikkilä (Lokomotiv Yaroslavl) (Czech Republic) Miloš Říha (Spartak Moscow)	Vyacheslav Bykov (Salavat Yulaev Ufa); Igor Zakharkin (Salavat Yulaev Ufa)
Starters:	(Slovakia) 81 – F Marcel Hossa (Dinamo Riga) (Sweden) 80 – F Mattias Weinhandl (Dynamo Moscow) (Slovakia) 92 – F Branko Radivojevič (Spartak Moscow) (Canada) 38 – D Kevin Dallman (Barys Astana) (Latvia) 08 – D Sandis Ozoliņš (Dinamo Riga) (Finland) 31 – G Karri Rämö (Avangard Omsk)	33 – F Maxim Sushinsky (SKA Saint Petersburg); 25 – F Alexander Radulov (Salavat Yulaev Ufa) (Moscow) 95 – F Aleksey Morozov (Ak Bars Kazan) (Moscow) 56 – D Sergei Zubov (SKA Saint Petersburg) (Moscow) 05 – D Ilya Nikulin (Ak Bars Kazan); 20 – G Georgi Gelashvili (Lokomotiv Yaroslavl)
Reserves:	(Czech Republic) 68 – F Jaromír Jágr (Avangard Omsk) (C) (Norway) 41 – F Patrick Thoresen (Salavat Yulaev Ufa) (Czech Republic) 63 – F Josef Vašíček (Lokomotiv Yaroslavl) (Canada) 17 – F Chris Simon (Vityaz Chekhov) (Czech Republic) 26 – F Jiří Hudler (Dynamo Moscow) (Finland) 18 – F Ville Peltonen (Dynamo Minsk) (Slovakia) 15 – F Jozef Stümpel (Barys Astana) (Slovakia) 77 – D Martin Štrbák (HC MVD) (Finland) 06 – D Lasse Kukkonen (Avangard Omsk) (Czech Republic) 04 – D Karel Rachůnek (Dynamo Moscow) (Canada) 16 – D Jeff Platt (Dynamo Minsk) (Canada) 34 – G Michael Garnett (HC MVD)	19 – F Alexei Yashin (SKA Saint Petersburg) (C); 25 – F Danis Zaripov (Ak Bars Kazan); 18 – F Sergei Fedorov (Metallurg Magnitogorsk); 10 – F Sergei Mozyakin (Atlant Moscow); 42 – F Sergei Zinovjev (Salavat Yulaev Ufa); 16 – F Denis Parshin (CSKA Moscow); 23 – F Alexei Tereschenko (Ak Bars Kazan); 79 – D Dmitri Kalinin (Salavat Yulaev Ufa) (Ukraine) 78 – D Anton Babchuk (Avangard Omsk); 22 – D Konstantin Korneyev (CSKA Moscow); 27 – D Vitaly Atyushov (Metallurg Magnitogorsk) (Belarus) 31 – G Andrei Mezin (Dynamo Minsk)

*International player's flags indicate nation of origin whereas Russian born player's flags indicate the Federal subject of origin

== See also ==
- 2009–10 KHL season
- Kontinental Hockey League All-Star Game
