= Vadim Shipachyov =

Russian ice hockey player (born 1987)

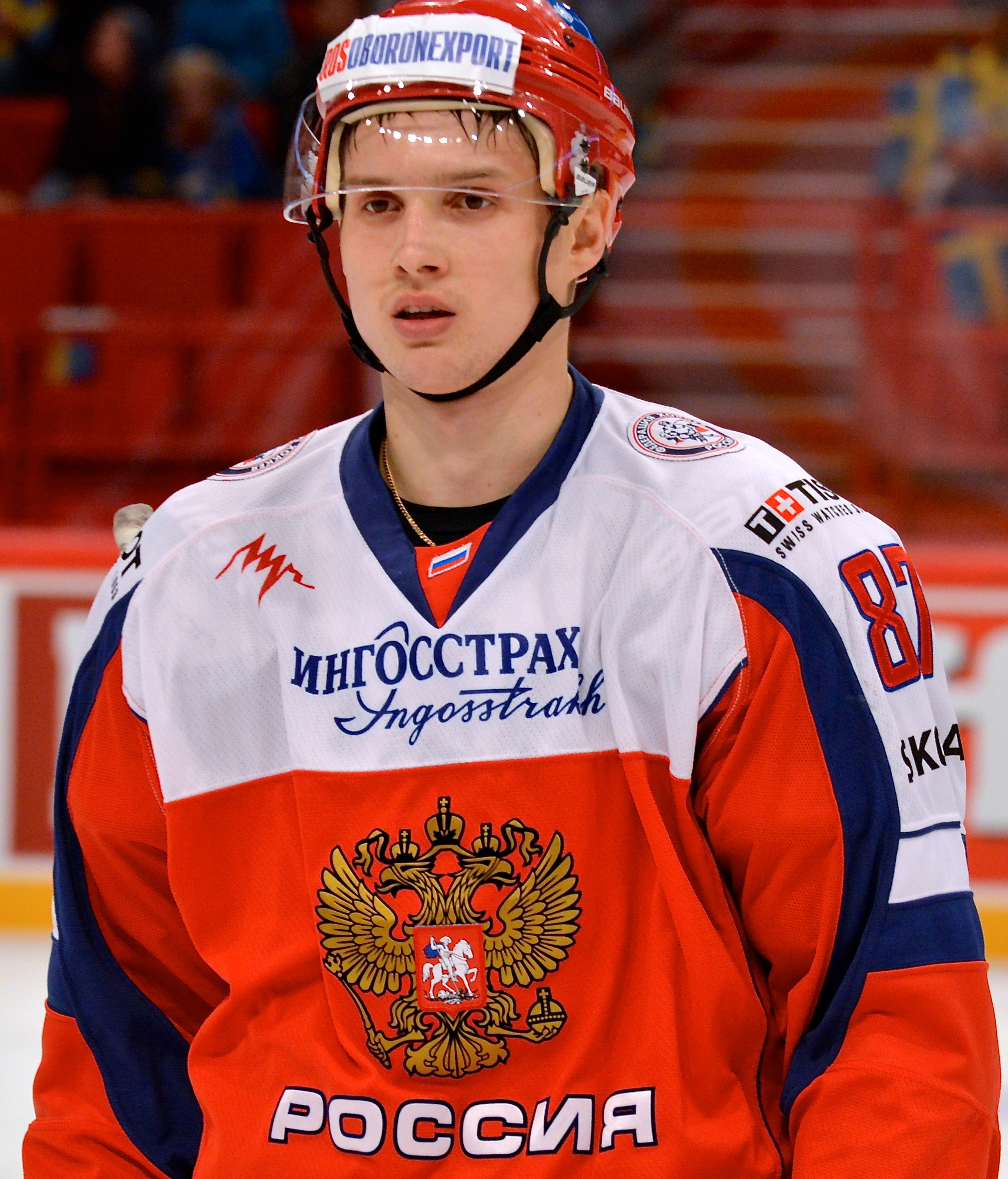
- Shipachyov with Russia in 2014
- Born: 12 March 1987 (age 39) Cherepovets, Russian SFSR, Soviet Union
- Height: 6 ft 1 in (185 cm)
- Weight: 187 lb (85 kg; 13 st 5 lb)
- Position: Centre
- Shoots: Left
- KHL team Former teams: Salavat Yulaev Ufa; Severstal Cherepovets; SKA Saint Petersburg; Vegas Golden Knights; Dynamo Moscow; Ak Bars Kazan; Dinamo Minsk
- National team: Russia
- NHL draft: Undrafted
- Playing career: 2005–present

Vadim Alexandrovich Shipachyov (Russian: Вадим Александрович Шипачёв; born 12 March 1987) is a Russian professional ice hockey forward for Salavat Yulaev Ufa of the Kontinental Hockey League (KHL). He previously played for Severstal Cherepovets, SKA Saint Petersburg, HC Dynamo Moscow, Ak Bars Kazan and Dinamo Minsk of the KHL and the Vegas Golden Knights of the National Hockey League (NHL). Shipachyov currently holds the Kontinental Hockey League's all-time scoring record.

== Playing career ==
On 4 May 2017, he signed with the Vegas Golden Knights making him the second person in history to be signed by the Golden Knights. On 15 October, he made his debut for the Golden Knights against the Boston Bruins and scored his first NHL goal on Bruins' goaltender Tuukka Rask. On 29 October, he was suspended by the Golden Knights for failing to report to their AHL affiliate. The following day, it was announced that he had decided to return to Russia, and that his contract would be terminated as soon as he had cleared unconditional waivers. On 9 November, the Golden Knights announced that their contract with Shipachyov was terminated, and that he was able to return to play in the Kontinental Hockey League (KHL).

On 11 November, Shipachyov signed with SKA Saint Petersburg of the Kontinental Hockey League (KHL) for the remainder of the 2017–18 KHL season. In 22 regular season games, Shipachyov tallied 25 points, helping SKA finish top of the league. In the post-season, he was unable to help SKA repeat as champions, losing in the conference finals against CSKA Moscow contributing 11 points in 14 games.

As a free agent after completing his fifth season with St. Petersburg, Shipachyov left to sign a two-year contract with Dynamo Moscow on May 17, 2018. During his four year tenure with Dynamo Moscow, Shipachyov led the team in scoring each year and also the league for three consecutive seasons before he was traded following the 2021–22 campaign, along with Vyacheslav Voynov to Ak Bars Kazan in exchange for financial compensation on 4 May 2022. He was later signed on 18 May 2022, to a three-year contract extension to remain with Ak Bars through 2025.

On 14 June 2024, it was announced that Shipachyov had signed with Dinamo Minsk on a two-year contract as Ak Bars traded him for cash. On 30 October 2024, he beat Sergey Mozyakin's KHL all-time scoring record with an assist on Vadim Moroz's goal against Severstal Cherepovets, his first team. On 12 January 2026, Shipachyov became the first player to score 1000 career points in the KHL, assisting on Moroz's game-winning goal against Admiral Vladivostok.

After two productive seasons with Belarusian club, HC Dinamo Minsk, Shipachyyov extended his career in the KHL by agreeing to a one-year contract with Salavat Yulaev Ufa on 9 June 2026.

== International play ==
Medal record

Ice hockey

Representing Olympic Athletes from Russia

Olympic Games
Gold medal – first place	2018 Pyeongchang	

Representing ROC

Olympic Games
Silver medal – second place	2022 Beijing	

Representing Russia

World Championships
Gold medal – first place	2014 Minsk	
Silver medal – second place	2015 Czech Republic	
Bronze medal – third place	2016 Russia	
Bronze medal – third place	2017 Germany/France	

Shipachyov has played for the Russian national team in the World Championships and World Cup of Hockey. He was the top scorer of the 2016 IIHF World Championship in which Russia won the bronze medal. He won a gold medal as a member of the Olympic Athletes from Russia team at the 2018 Winter Olympics.

On 23 January 2022, Shipachyov was named to the roster to represent Russian Olympic Committee athletes at the 2022 Winter Olympics.

== Career statistics ==
=== Regular season and playoffs ===
			Regular season					Playoffs
Season	Team	League	GP	G	A	Pts	PIM	GP	G	A	Pts	PIM
2003–04	Severstal–2 Cherepovets	RUS.3	12	1	2	3	0	—	—	—	—	—
2004–05	Severstal–2 Cherepovets	RUS.3	55	6	12	18	28	—	—	—	—	—
2005–06	Severstal Cherepovets	RSL	2	0	0	0	0	—	—	—	—	—
2005–06	Severstal–2 Cherepovets	RUS.3	51	16	23	39	44	—	—	—	—	—
2006–07	Severstal Cherepovets	RSL	1	0	1	1	0	—	—	—	—	—
2006–07	Severstal–2 Cherepovets	RUS.3	26	9	22	31	30	—	—	—	—	—
2006–07	HC Belgorod	RUS.2	8	2	5	7	2	7	2	2	4	4
2007–08	HC Belgorod	RUS.2	34	8	30	38	18	—	—	—	—	—
2007–08	Severstal Cherepovets	RSL	8	0	0	0	0	4	0	0	0	0
2007–08	Severstal–2 Cherepovets	RUS.3	4	3	5	8	8	—	—	—	—	—
2008–09	Severstal Cherepovets	KHL	29	4	4	8	12	—	—	—	—	—
2008–09	Severstal–2 Cherepovets	RUS.3	5	5	10	15	0	14	9	15	24	10
2009–10	Severstal Cherepovets	KHL	55	14	30	44	30	—	—	—	—	—
2010–11	Severstal Cherepovets	KHL	51	13	25	38	22	6	2	1	3	8
2011–12	Severstal Cherepovets	KHL	54	22	37	59	26	6	1	2	3	4
2012–13	Severstal Cherepovets	KHL	51	17	24	41	12	6	1	5	6	14
2013–14	SKA Saint Petersburg	KHL	52	12	20	32	10	10	1	0	1	2
2014–15	SKA Saint Petersburg	KHL	49	12	42	54	20	22	6	15	21	2
2015–16	SKA Saint Petersburg	KHL	54	17	43	60	63	15	7	9	16	12
2016–17	SKA Saint Petersburg	KHL	50	26	50	76	22	17	4	16	20	8
2017–18	Vegas Golden Knights	NHL	3	1	0	1	2	—	—	—	—	—
2017–18	SKA Saint Petersburg	KHL	22	9	16	25	8	14	4	7	11	4
2018–19	Dynamo Moscow	KHL	61	20	48	68	30	11	1	7	8	10
2019–20	Dynamo Moscow	KHL	61	17	48	65	28	6	4	4	8	20
2020–21	Dynamo Moscow	KHL	57	20	47	67	22	10	1	6	7	10
2021–22	Dynamo Moscow	KHL	48	24	43	67	47	11	3	7	10	6
2022–23	Ak Bars Kazan	KHL	68	9	36	45	24	24	4	8	12	4
2023–24	Ak Bars Kazan	KHL	62	13	31	44	32	5	1	1	2	0
2024–25	Dinamo Minsk	KHL	66	15	42	57	28	9	1	2	3	2
2025–26	Dinamo Minsk	KHL	64	15	27	42	21	8	1	4	5	2
KHL totals			954	279	613	892	457	180	42	93	135	108
NHL totals			3	1	0	1	2	—	—	—	—	—

=== International ===
Year	Team	Event	Result	GP	G	A	Pts	PIM
2014	Russia	WC	1st place, gold medalist(s)	7	3	4	7	4
2015	Russia	WC	2nd place, silver medalist(s)	10	4	5	9	2
2016	Russia	WC	3rd place, bronze medalist(s)	10	6	12	18	8
2016	Russia	WCH	4th	2	0	1	1	2
2017	Russia	WC	3rd place, bronze medalist(s)	10	2	11	13	2
2018	OAR	OG	1st place, gold medalist(s)	1	0	0	0	0
2022	ROC	OG	2nd place, silver medalist(s)	6	1	2	3	0
Senior totals				46	16	35	51	18

== Awards and honors ==
Award	Year
KHL
All-Star Game	2012, 2015, 2016, 2019, 2020
Gagarin Cup	2015, 2017
First All-Star Team	2017, 2021, 2022
Golden Stick Award (MVP)	2021, 2022
International
WC All-Star Team	2016
