= Sergei Mozyakin =

Russian ice hockey player (born 1981)

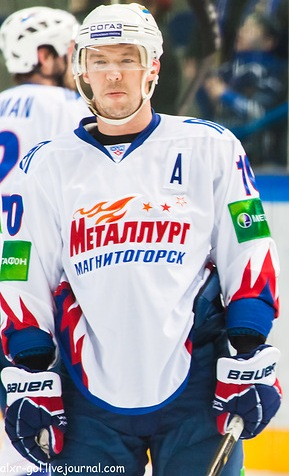
- Mozyakin with Metallurg Magnitogorsk in 2012
- Born: 30 March 1981 (age 44) Yaroslavl, Russian SFSR, Soviet Union
- Height: 5 ft 11 in (180 cm)
- Weight: 190 lb (86 kg; 13 st 8 lb)
- Position: Winger
- Shot: Right
- Played for: CSKA Moscow; Atlant Moscow Oblast; Metallurg Magnitogorsk
- National team: Russia
- NHL draft: 263rd overall, 2002; Columbus Blue Jackets
- Playing career: 1999–2021

Sergei Valeryevich Mozyakin (Russian: Серге́й Вале́рьевич Мозя́кин; born 30 March 1981) is a Russian former professional ice hockey winger who last played for Metallurg Magnitogorsk in the Kontinental Hockey League (KHL). With over 735 points and 162 playoff points in his KHL career, he is both the six-time points leader (2008–09, 2009–10, 2012–13, 2013–14, 2015–16, 2016–17), and the all-time highest scorer in both the regular season and the playoffs in the KHL.

Although Mozyakin was drafted in the ninth round of the 2002 NHL entry draft by the Columbus Blue Jackets, Mozyakin never opted to leave the KHL in his career.

== Playing career ==
Sergei Mozyakin, a highly skilled winger, was drafted in the ninth round of the 2002 NHL entry draft, 263rd overall by the Columbus Blue Jackets, but chose not to play for the team or in the NHL. In the 2005–06 Russian Superleague (RSL) regular season, Mozyakin had a tight scoring race with Aleksey Morozov and Evgeni Malkin for the top scorer of the league. Mozyakin finished the season leading the league with 52 points.

In the 2007–08 RSL regular season, which would be its final in existence before being absorbed into the KHL, Mozyakin had another tight scoring race with Morozov and finished the season only one point ahead of Morozov, leading the league in goals (37) and points (64). He went on to win the scoring title six times in the KHL (2008–09, 2009–10, 2012–13, 2013–14, 2015–16, and 2016–17), giving him eight elite league scoring titles.

On February 17, 2013, Mozyakin signed a six-year contract extension to remain with Magnitogorsk. In the 2013–14 KHL season, he won the Gagarin Cup with Metallurg Magnitogorsk as team captain and leading scorer.

Mozyakin has also been a regular member of the Russian national team, taking part in all twelve EHT games in the 2007–08 season. He scored four goals and three assists for seven points in the tournament. Mozyakin also took part in the 2008 and 2009 World Championship-winning Russian gold medal teams. He also competed as a member of the Olympic Athletes from Russia team at the 2018 Winter Olympics.

On July 5, 2021, Mozyakin announced his retirement.

== Personal life ==
Sergei and his wife Yulia have a son, Andrei, and two daughters, Maria and Daria.

== Career statistics ==
=== Regular season and playoffs ===
			Regular season					Playoffs
Season	Team	League	GP	G	A	Pts	PIM	GP	G	A	Pts	PIM
1997–98	Torpedo–2 Yaroslavl	RUS.2	—	—	—	—	—	—	—	—	—	—
1998–99	Val-d'Or Foreurs	QMJHL	4	0	1	1	2	—	—	—	—	—
1999–2000	CSKA Moscow	RUS.2	44	23	25	48	10	—	—	—	—	—
1999–2000	CSKA–2 Moscow	RUS.3	6	9	3	12	6	—	—	—	—	—
2000–01	CSKA Moscow	RSL	9	0	2	2	0	—	—	—	—	—
2000–01	CSKA Moscow	RUS.2	37	22	28	50	18	—	—	—	—	—
2001–02	CSKA Moscow	RUS.2	54	34	30	64	10	14	10	13	23	4
2002–03	CSKA Moscow	RSL	33	12	15	27	18	—	—	—	—	—
2003–04	CSKA Moscow	RSL	45	21	19	40	6	—	—	—	—	—
2004–05	CSKA Moscow	RSL	49	11	12	23	22	—	—	—	—	—
2005–06	CSKA Moscow	RSL	51	20	31	51	28	7	1	2	3	4
2006–07	Khimik Moscow Oblast	RSL	54	27	33	60	10	9	5	3	8	4
2007–08	Khimik Moscow Oblast	RSL	57	37	29	66	22	5	3	1	4	0
2008–09	Atlant Moscow Oblast	KHL	56	34	42	76	14	7	2	5	7	0
2009–10	Atlant Moscow Oblast	KHL	56	27	39	66	44	4	1	3	4	0
2010–11	Atlant Moscow Oblast	KHL	54	27	34	61	12	23	8	13	21	2
2011–12	Metallurg Magnitogorsk	KHL	53	20	19	39	18	12	6	3	9	0
2012–13	Metallurg Magnitogorsk	KHL	48	35	41	76	6	7	2	4	6	0
2013–14	Metallurg Magnitogorsk	KHL	54	34	39	73	8	21	13	20	33	8
2014–15	Metallurg Magnitogorsk	KHL	49	27	27	54	14	10	8	5	13	0
2015–16	Metallurg Magnitogorsk	KHL	57	32	35	67	0	23	11	14	25	2
2016–17	Metallurg Magnitogorsk	KHL	60	48	37	85	4	17	7	17	24	6
2017–18	Metallurg Magnitogorsk	KHL	42	19	23	42	4	11	4	8	12	0
2018–19	Metallurg Magnitogorsk	KHL	61	23	32	55	10	6	0	3	3	2
2019–20	Metallurg Magnitogorsk	KHL	57	15	26	41	16	5	2	3	5	0
2020–21	Metallurg Magnitogorsk	KHL	38	10	11	21	4	11	4	6	10	0
RSL totals			298	128	141	269	106	21	9	6	15	8
KHL totals			685	351	405	756	154	157	68	104	172	20

=== International ===
Medal record

Ice hockey

Representing Olympic Athletes from Russia

Olympic Games
Gold medal – first place	2018 Pyeongchang	

Representing Russia

World Championships
Gold medal – first place	2008 Canada	
Gold medal – first place	2009 Switzerland	
Silver medal – second place	2010 Germany	
Silver medal – second place	2015 Czech Republic	
Bronze medal – third place	2016 Russia	
Bronze medal – third place	2017 Germany/France	

Year	Team	Event	Result	GP	G	A	Pts	PIM
2006	Russia	WC	5th	4	2	1	3	0
2008	Russia	WC	1st place, gold medalist(s)	7	0	1	1	2
2009	Russia	WC	1st place, gold medalist(s)	6	2	2	4	2
2010	Russia	WC	2nd place, silver medalist(s)	4	1	1	2	0
2013	Russia	WC	6th	8	1	3	4	2
2015	Russia	WC	2nd place, silver medalist(s)	10	6	6	12	0
2016	Russia	WC	3rd place, bronze medalist(s)	9	6	3	9	2
2017	Russia	WC	3rd place, bronze medalist(s)	3	1	2	3	0
2018	OAR	OG	1st place, gold medalist(s)	6	1	3	4	0
Senior totals				57	20	22	42	8

== Awards and honors ==
Award	Year
KHL
Gentleman Award	2009, 2011, 2013, 2014, 2016, 2017
Golden Stick Award (MVP)	2013, 2014, 2016, 2017
Best Sniper	2013, 2014, 2016, 2017
First All-Star Team	2010, 2011, 2012, 2013, 2014, 2016, 2017
All-Star Game	2009, 2010, 2011, 2012, 2013, 2014, 2015, 2016, 2017, 2018, 2019, 2020
Gagarin Cup (Metallurg Magnitogorsk)	2014, 2016
