= 2012 Kontinental Hockey League All-Star Game =

2012 KHL All-Star Game
	1	2	3	Total
Team Fedorov	3	5	7	15
Team Ozoliņš	4	4	3	11
- Date: 21 January 2012
- Arena: Arena Riga
- City: Riga, Latvia
- Attendance: 10,950

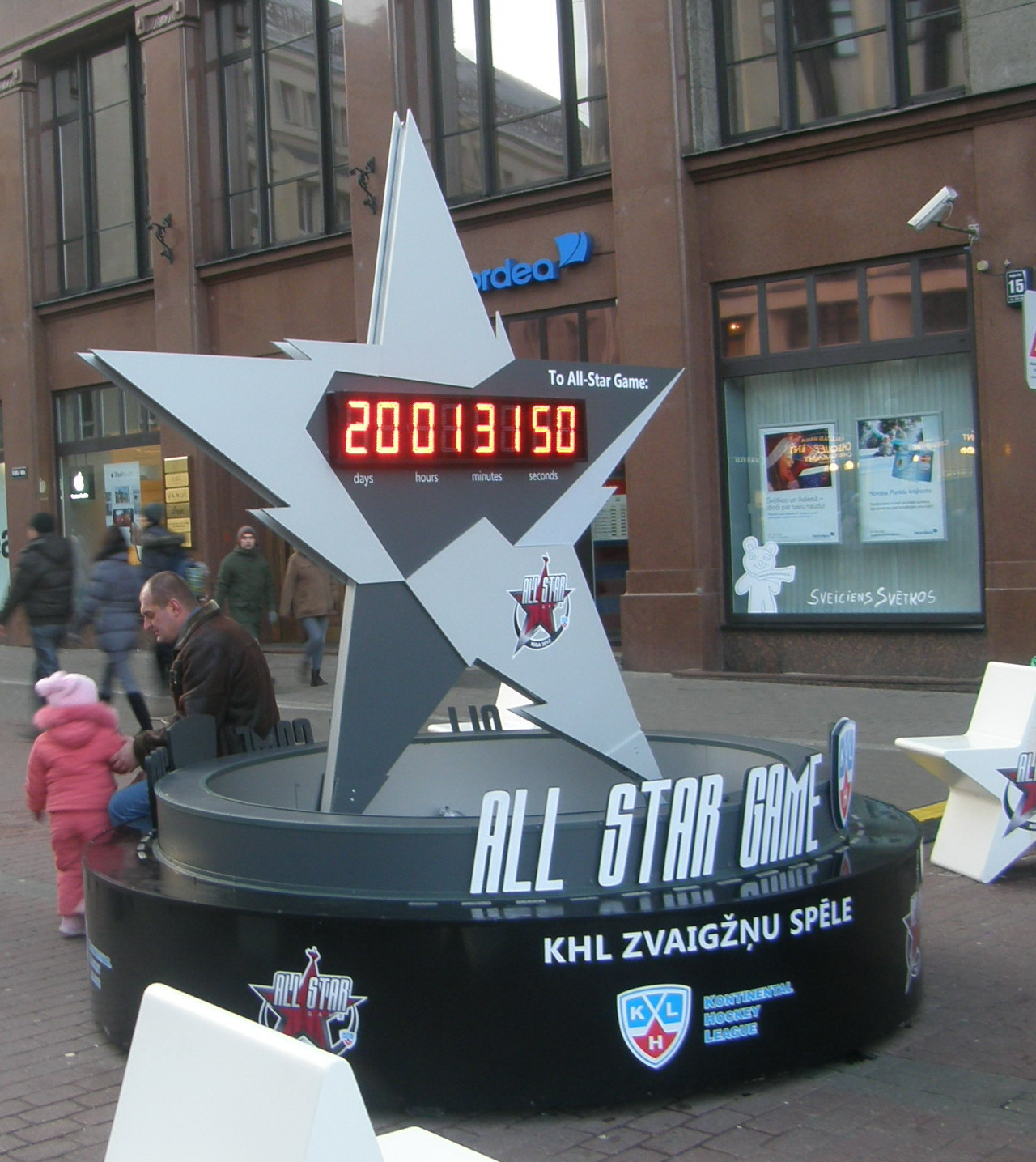
4th Kontinental Hockey League All-Star Game clock

The 2012 Kontinental Hockey League All-Star Game was the All-Star game for the 2011-12 season of the Kontinental Hockey League (KHL). It took place on 20 (Legends Game) and 21 (All-Star Game) January 2012 at the Arena Riga in Riga, Latvia.

== Skills Competition Winners ==
- The Fastest Skater - Miķelis Rēdlihs
- Shootout Skill - Vladimir Tarasenko
- Goaltender Competition - Chris Holt
- Longest Shot - Dmitri Kalinin
- Puck Control Team Relay - Team Ozoliņš
- Shooting Accuracy - Sergei Mozyakin
- Hardest Shot - Alexander Riazantsev (183.67 km/h, which is considered as a new world record)
- Captains Duel - Sergei Fedorov
- Fastest Skater Team Relay - Team Fedorov

== Rosters ==
	Team Fedorov (East)	Team Ozoliņš (West)
Coach:	(Russia) Valery Belousov (Traktor Chelyabinsk)	(Czech Republic) Miloš Říha (SKA Saint Petersburg)
Assistant Coaches:	(Finland) Hannu Jortikka (Amur Khabarovsk)	(Latvia) Oļegs Znaroks (Dynamo Moscow)
Starters:	(Russia) – F Evgeny Kuznetsov (Traktor Chelyabinsk) (Russia) – F Alexei Kalyuzhny (Avangard Omsk) (Czech Republic) – F Jakub Petružálek (Amur Khabarovsk) (Russia) – D Ilya Nikulin (Ak Bars Kazan) (Finland) – D Mikko Mäenpää (Amur Khabarovsk) (Russia) – G Mikhail Biryukov (Yugra Khanty-Mansiysk)	(Latvia) – F Miķelis Rēdlihs (Dinamo Riga) (Russia) – F Vadim Schipachev (Severstal Cherepovets) (Czech Republic) – F Zbyněk Irgl (Dinamo Minsk) (Finland) – D Jere Karalahti (Dinamo Minsk) (Russia) – D Maxim Chudinov (Severstal Cherepovets) (Russia) – G Konstantin Barulin (Atlant Moscow Oblast)
Reserves:	(Russia) – F Sergei Fedorov (Metallurg Magnitogorsk) (C) (Russia) – F Alexander Radulov (Salavat Yulaev Ufa) (Russia) – F Vladimir Tarasenko (Sibir Novosibirsk) (Czech Republic) – F Roman Červenka (Avangard Omsk) (Russia) – F Sergei Mozyakin (Metallurg Magnitogorsk) (United States) – F Brandon Bochenski (Barys Astana) (Russia) – F Alexander Frolov (Avangard Omsk) (Canada) – D Kevin Dallman (Barys Astana) (Russia) – D Alexander Riazantsev (Traktor Chelyabinsk) (Russia) – D Vitali Proshkin (Salavat Yulaev Ufa) (Russia) – D Yevgeny Medvedev (Ak Bars Kazan) (Canada) – G Michael Garnett (Traktor Chelyabinsk)	(Russia) – F Sergei Shirokov (CSKA Moscow) (Sweden) – F Tony Mårtensson (SKA Saint Petersburg) (Russia) – F Mikhail Anisin (Vityaz Chekhov) (Russia) – F Nikolay Zherdev (Atlant Moscow Oblast) (Latvia) – F Mārtiņš Karsums (Dinamo Riga) (Russia) – F Vyacheslav Kozlov (Dynamo Moscow) (Latvia) – D Sandis Ozoliņš (Dinamo Riga) (C) (Russia) – D Dmitri Kalinin (SKA Saint Petersburg) (Finland) – D Janne Niskala (Atlant Moscow Oblast) (Russia) – D Kirill Koltsov (SKA Saint Petersburg) (Czech Republic) – D Karel Pilař (Lev Poprad) (Canada) – G Chris Holt (Dinamo Riga)

=== Notes ===
- ^W1 Geoff Platt was named to the Team Ozoliņš, but did not to play. Zbyněk Irgl was named as his replacement.
- ^W2 Vitali Koval was named to the Team Ozoliņš, but did not play. Chris Holt was named as his replacement.

== See also ==
- 2011–12 KHL season
- Kontinental Hockey League All-Star Game
