= Marcel Hossa =

Slovak ice hockey player (born 1981)

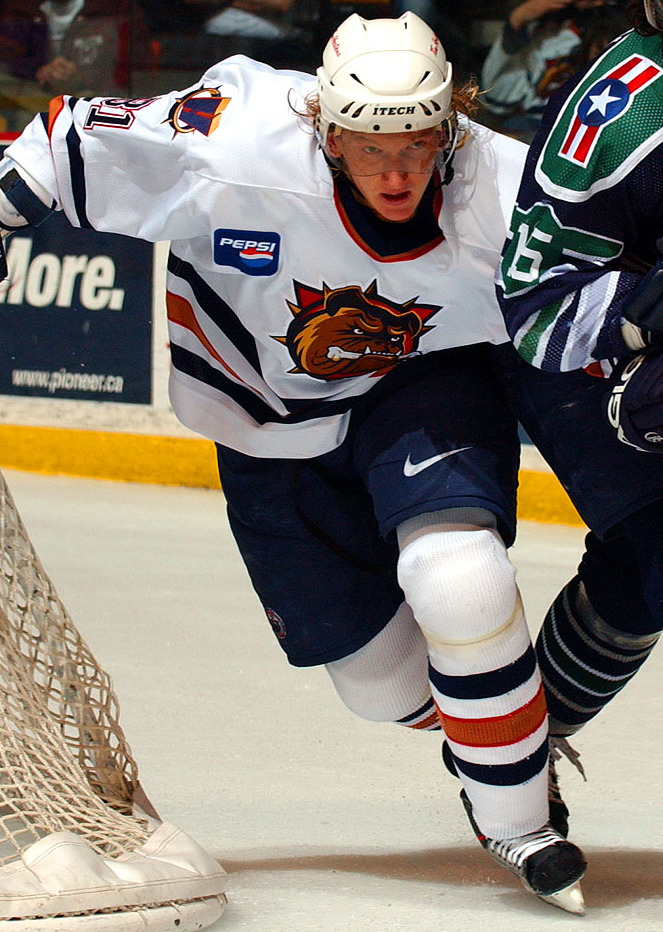
- Hossa with the Hamilton Bulldogs in 2003
- Born: 12 October 1981 (age 44) Ilava, Czechoslovakia
- Height: 6 ft 3 in (191 cm)
- Weight: 220 lb (100 kg; 15 st 10 lb)
- Position: Left wing
- Shot: Left
- Played for: Montreal Canadiens; Mora IK; New York Rangers; Phoenix Coyotes; Dinamo Riga; Ak Bars Kazan; Spartak Moscow; Lev Praha; Dukla Trenčín; Modo Hockey; Škoda Plzeň; Oceláři Třinec
- National team: Slovakia
- NHL draft: 16th overall, 2000; Montreal Canadiens
- Playing career: 2001–2018

Marcel Hossa (Slovak pronunciation: [ˈmartsel ˈɦɔsa]; born 12 October 1981) is a Slovak former professional ice hockey left winger. Hossa played in the National Hockey League (NHL) with the Montreal Canadiens, New York Rangers and Phoenix Coyotes, having been drafted by the Canadiens in the first round, 16th overall, in the 2000 NHL entry draft.

Hossa has also played in the Kontinental Hockey League (KHL) for Dinamo Riga, Ak Bars Kazan and Spartak Moscow. Internationally, Hossa has represented Slovakia on several occasions, including at the 2006, 2010 and 2014 Winter Olympics.

Hossa's older brother is Marián Hossa, also a professional ice hockey player, who is a three-time Stanley Cup champion and a member of Hockey Hall of Fame.

== Playing career ==
Hossa was selected in the first round of the 2000 NHL entry draft, 16th overall, by the Montreal Canadiens. Prior to relocating to North America, he first played junior hockey in his native Slovakia with Dukla Trenčín before joining the Portland Winter Hawks of the Western Hockey League (WHL) ahead of the 1998–99 season.

Several seasons later, Hossa led the Winterhawks in scoring and to the WHL finals in 2000–01, his third year in the WHL, before turning professional the following season with the Canadiens' then-American Hockey League (AHL) affiliate, the Quebec Citadelles. He played the majority of the 2001–02 season with the Citadelles, finishing fifth on the team in points with 32. He was recalled by the Canadiens midway through the season and made his NHL debut, ultimately appearing in ten games.

Over the next two seasons, Hossa split time between the Canadiens and the team's new AHL affiliate, the Hamilton Bulldogs, being named in the 2003 NHL YoungStars Game. Despite showing promise, however, Hossa was unable to establish a full-time role with Montreal at the NHL level. During the 2004 2004–05 NHL lockout, he signed a one-year contract with Swedish team Mora IK of the Elitserien on 25 September 2004, reuniting him with older brother, Marián Hossa; Marcel Hossa finished the year fifth in team scoring with 24 points.

Prior to the 2005–06 season, on 30 September 2005, Hossa was traded to the New York Rangers in exchange for Garth Murray. In his first season with the Rangers, Hossa appeared in a career-high 64 games and scored ten goals. In 2006–07, after a slow start to the year, he was later shifted to the team's top line in February, responding with eight goals in 11 games, finishing the season with an NHL career-high 18 points. His season was then halted, however, after injuring his right knee in a 2–1 victory over the New York Islanders on 5 March 2007.

In the 2007–08 season, Hossa struggled to regain his offensive form and played in 36 games with the Rangers before he was assigned to the team's AHL affiliate, the Hartford Wolf Pack, on a conditioning stint on 16 February 2008. On 26 February, he was then traded to the Phoenix Coyotes, along with goaltender Al Montoya, in exchange for Fredrik Sjöström, David LeNeveu and Josh Gratton. Hossa played out the season with the Coyotes, going scoreless in 14 games.

On 3 July 2008, as an unrestricted free agent, Hossa signed with Dinamo Riga of the newly-formed Kontinental Hockey League (KHL). After leading Riga with 22 goals in the 2008–09 season, Hossa went a step further in 2009–10, leading the KHL in goals with 35. Following his impressive offensive output, he was selected to play internationally for Slovakia—alongside brother Marián—in the 2010 Winter Olympics in Vancouver.

On 7 May 2010, Hossa left Riga and after signing a two-year contract with reigning KHL champions Ak Bars Kazan.

On 26 July 2011, Hossa signed a one-year contract with Spartak Moscow.

On 16 May 2013, announced that Hossa is returning to Dinamo Riga after signing a one-year contract, later being released from the team on 20 December 2014. On 30 January 2015, however, he signed a contract with Modo Hockey in Sweden to play out the remainder of the 2014–15 season.

== Career statistics ==
=== Regular season and playoffs ===
			Regular season					Playoffs
Season	Team	League	GP	G	A	Pts	PIM	GP	G	A	Pts	PIM
1997–98	Dukla Trenčín	SVK U20	55	32	56	88	68	—	—	—	—	—
1998–99	Portland Winter Hawks	WHL	70	7	14	21	66	2	0	0	0	0
1999–2000	Portland Winter Hawks	WHL	60	24	29	53	58	—	—	—	—	—
2000–01	Portland Winter Hawks	WHL	58	34	56	90	58	16	5	7	12	14
2001–02	Quebec Citadelles	AHL	50	17	15	32	24	3	0	0	0	4
2001–02	Montreal Canadiens	NHL	10	3	1	4	2	—	—	—	—	—
2002–03	Hamilton Bulldogs	AHL	37	19	13	32	18	21	4	7	11	12
2002–03	Montreal Canadiens	NHL	34	6	7	13	14	—	—	—	—	—
2003–04	Montreal Canadiens	NHL	15	1	1	2	8	—	—	—	—	—
2003–04	Hamilton Bulldogs	AHL	57	18	22	40	45	10	2	3	5	8
2004–05	Mora IK	SEL	48	18	6	24	69	—	—	—	—	—
2005–06	New York Rangers	NHL	64	10	6	16	28	4	0	0	0	6
2006–07	New York Rangers	NHL	64	10	8	18	26	10	2	2	4	4
2007–08	New York Rangers	NHL	36	1	7	8	24	—	—	—	—	—
2007–08	Hartford Wolf Pack	AHL	5	1	0	1	2	—	—	—	—	—
2007–08	Phoenix Coyotes	NHL	14	0	0	0	4	—	—	—	—	—
2008–09	Dinamo Riga	KHL	52	22	22	44	118	3	2	0	2	0
2009–10	Dinamo Riga	KHL	56	35	20	55	44	9	4	1	5	4
2010–11	Ak Bars Kazan	KHL	51	16	15	31	12	8	2	1	3	2
2011–12	Spartak Moscow	KHL	35	6	11	17	42	—	—	—	—	—
2011–12	Dinamo Riga	KHL	19	8	6	14	14	7	3	1	4	4
2012–13	Lev Praha	KHL	50	8	11	19	28	4	0	0	0	14
2013–14	Dinamo Riga	KHL	50	22	19	41	33	7	2	2	4	11
2014–15	Dinamo Riga	KHL	38	7	9	16	24	—	—	—	—	—
2014–15	HK Dukla Trenčín	SVK	4	2	2	4	2	—	—	—	—	—
2014–15	Modo Hockey	SHL	11	3	3	6	0	—	—	—	—	—
2015–16	HC Škoda Plzeň	ELH	20	8	8	16	35	—	—	—	—	—
2015–16	HC Oceláři Třinec	ELH	2	0	1	1	0	—	—	—	—	—
2016–17	HK Dukla Trenčín	SVK	52	22	21	43	30	—	—	—	—	—
2017–18	HK Dukla Trenčín	SVK	28	14	6	20	8	17	6	1	7	35
NHL totals			237	31	30	61	106	14	2	2	4	10
KHL totals			351	124	113	227	315	38	13	5	18	35

=== International ===
Medal record

Representing Slovakia

Men's ice hockey

IIHF U18 Championships
Bronze medal – third place	1999 Germany	

World Championships
Silver medal – second place	2012 Helsinki	

Year	Team	Event	GP	G	A	Pts	PIM
1999	Slovakia	U18	7	2	0	2	14
2000	Slovakia	WJC	7	0	1	1	8
2001	Slovakia	WJC	7	1	3	4	8
2005	Slovakia	WC	2	0	0	0	0
2006	Slovakia	OG	6	0	0	0	0
2006	Slovakia	WC	7	1	3	4	6
2008	Slovakia	WC	5	2	5	7	2
2009	Slovakia	WC	6	3	2	5	4
2010	Slovakia	OG	7	0	1	1	0
2011	Slovakia	WC	6	1	0	1	2
2012	Slovakia	WC	6	0	0	0	0
2014	Slovakia	OG	4	0	0	0	0
Junior totals			21	3	4	7	30
Senior totals			49	7	11	18	14

== Awards and honors ==
Award	Year
WHL
CHL Top Prospects Game	2000
West Second All-Star Team	2001
NHL
NHL YoungStars Game	2003
KHL
All-Star Game	2009, 2010, 2014
Best Sniper	2010

== See also ==
- Notable families in the NHL

Awards and achievements
Preceded by Ron Hainsey	Montreal Canadiens first-round draft pick 2000	Succeeded by Mike Komisarek
