= Sandis Ozoliņš =

Latvian ice hockey player (born 1972)

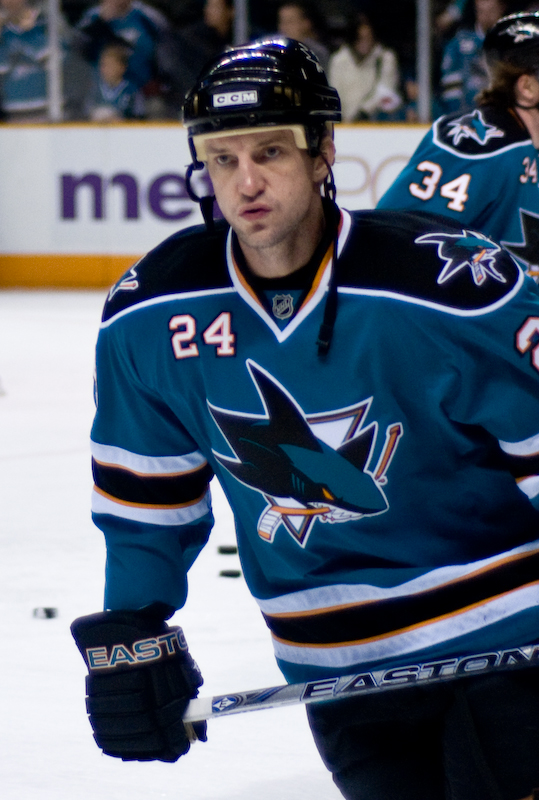
- Ozoliņš with the San Jose Sharks in 2008
- Born: 3 August 1972 (age 54) Riga, Latvian SSR, Soviet Union
- Height: 6 ft 3 in (191 cm)
- Weight: 214 lb (97 kg; 15 st 4 lb)
- Position: Defence
- Shot: Left
- Played for: Dinamo Riga; San Jose Sharks; Colorado Avalanche; Carolina Hurricanes; Florida Panthers; Mighty Ducks of Anaheim; New York Rangers; Dinamo Riga; Atlant Moscow Oblast
- National team: Latvia
- NHL draft: 30th overall, 1991; San Jose Sharks
- Playing career: 1990–2014

Sandis Ozoliņš (born 3 August 1972), commonly spelled Sandis Ozolinsh /ˈsɑːndɪs ˈoʊzoʊlɪntʃ/ in North America, is a Latvian former professional ice hockey player and coach. During his career in North America, Ozoliņš was a seven-time NHL All-Star, Stanley Cup champion (as a member of the 1995–96 Colorado Avalanche), and James Norris Memorial Trophy finalist. He is also the all-time leader for goals, assists, points, and games played by a Latvian in the National Hockey League (NHL) and holds several Colorado Avalanche and San Jose Sharks franchise records. Ozoliņš was also the highest-paid sportsman in Latvian history, before NBA basketball player Andris Biedriņš succeeded him in 2008. He briefly became the head coach of Dinamo Riga in 2017.

Ozoliņš was drafted in the 1991 NHL entry draft by the San Jose Sharks as the 8th pick of the second round, 30th overall. He played for the Sharks, Colorado Avalanche, Carolina Hurricanes, Florida Panthers, Mighty Ducks of Anaheim and New York Rangers. He is often considered a prototype "offensive defenceman," becoming heavily involved in his team's offense and scoring opportunities.

In 2014, Ozoliņš was awarded Order of the Three Stars for his long-standing contributions to Latvian ice hockey and sports.

== Playing career ==
=== Early playing career ===
Ozoliņš was drafted 30th overall by the San Jose Sharks in the 1991 NHL entry draft and had played for the Kansas City Blades, a minor league team in the International Hockey League. He and Latvian teammate Artūrs Irbe won a Turner Cup with the Blades in 1992.

=== National Hockey League ===
==== San Jose Sharks ====
Ozoliņš joined the Sharks in 1992–93, scoring 23 points in 37 games. He missed the majority of his rookie season recovering from a knee injury suffered in a game against the Philadelphia Flyers on December 30, 1992. After recovering from his injury, Ozoliņš ended the 1993–94 season with an 81-game, 26-goal and 64-point sophomore effort, leading the league in goals by a defenceman. Ozoliņš helped the Sharks to move beyond the first round of the playoffs for the first time in franchise history, losing in the 1994 conference semifinals.

==== Colorado Avalanche ====
Ozoliņš initially held out at the start of the 1995–96 season for a new contract from the Sharks. During that time he played two games with the San Francisco Spiders, an expansion team in the minor International Hockey League. He scored one goal, the first goal in team history. Back in the NHL, he had one goal and three assists in seven games for the Sharks before being acquired by the Colorado Avalanche for Owen Nolan on October 26, 1995. In 66 games during his first season, Ozoliņš scored 50 points, with more than half them on the power play. Ozoliņš won the Stanley Cup with the Avalanche in 1996. The following season Colorado won the Presidents' Trophy. After losing to the Detroit Red Wings in the 1997 Conference Final, Ozoliņš finished third in votes for the James Norris Memorial Trophy, awarded to the league's most outstanding defenceman. In the regular season, he scored a career-high 68 points, second in the league for defencemen after Brian Leetch. Ozoliņš recorded his first career hat trick on December 6, 1999, against the Vancouver Canucks. The 1999–2000 season was his final year in Denver, in which Ozoliņš made $4 million as Colorado's third-highest paid player.

==== Carolina, Florida and Anaheim ====
During the 2000 NHL entry draft, Ozoliņš was traded to the Carolina Hurricanes for Nolan Pratt and draft picks that became Václav Nedorost, Jared Aulin, and Agris Saviels. The agreement reunited Ozoliņš with fellow Latvian Artūrs Irbe. They had played together in Latvia and San Jose, shared an agent, and together funded a youth ice hockey organization that bought equipment for children in Latvia. After expiration of Ozoliņš' Avalanche deal, he signed a five-year contract with Carolina worth more than $25 million. "When you have a player like Sandis, you're willing to spend the money," general manager Jim Rutherford said. Ozoliņš didn t help the Hurricanes to advance in the playoffs, playing just one and a half seasons with Carolina before being traded to the Florida Panthers.

Ozoliņš was traded to Florida in the middle of the 2001–02 season along with Byron Ritchie in exchange for Bret Hedican, Kevyn Adams, Tomáš Malec and a draft pick. He made his Panthers debut against the Chicago Blackhawks on January 16, 2002. Ozoliņš recorded 10 goals and 19 assists in the remaining 37 games of the season. The Panthers did not make the playoffs during his time in Florida.

During the 2002–03 season, the Panthers sent Ozoliņš to the Mighty Ducks of Anaheim for Matt Cullen, Pavel Trnka and a draft pick. During the 2003 NHL All-Star weekend (several days after he had been traded), Ozoliņš skipped the NHL All-Star skills competition where he would have had to wear a Panthers uniform. "Participating in the All-Star Game is one thing, but the skills competition is another," said Ozoliņš, who was voted as an Eastern Conference starter. "It would look really unusual for a player to be representing his old team, so I thought this was the right thing to do." He was fined an undisclosed amount by the league. Upon his arrival with the Ducks, Ozoliņš helped the club reach their first Stanley Cup Final, losing a seven-game series to the New Jersey Devils. In 2003–04, Ozoliņš battled injuries and was limited to 36 games.

==== New York Rangers and return to San Jose ====
Following the NHL lockout in 2004–05, Ozoliņš was dealt to the New York Rangers at the trade deadline for a third-round draft pick (which the Rangers had obtained earlier in a trade with the San Jose Sharks). With 14 points in 19 games in the 2005–06 season, Ozoliņš helped his team advance to the 2006 playoffs, for which the Rangers had not qualified since 1997. In the next season on December 18, 2006, on the heels of a 6–1 loss to New Jersey, the Rangers placed Ozoliņš on waivers. After clearing waivers, Ozoliņš was assigned to the Hartford Wolf Pack of the American Hockey League (AHL), but a short while later was put on the injured reserve list due to a knee injury.

Ozoliņš later entered into the league's substance abuse program following a drunk driving arrest. After playing two games for the Worcester Sharks of the AHL and being cleared to play by doctors within the league's substance abuse program, he signed a one-year contract with San Jose on November 2, 2007. "That was a big turnaround this summer and I'm finally comfortable with what I am and what has happened, I actually feel pretty good and I do what I have to do and I do what I was advised to do. And I do it for myself and not for anybody else," said Ozoliņš. In the 2007–08 season he recorded three goals and 13 assists in 39 games for the Sharks.

=== Kontinental Hockey League ===
==== Dinamo Riga ====
After his season with the Sharks, Ozoliņš was offered a one-year contract by the Los Angeles Kings worth $800,000, but he declined it and went on hiatus from playing for a year.

On July 13, 2009, Ozoliņš signed a one-year deal with Dinamo Riga of the Kontinental Hockey League (KHL). Ozoliņš was named a captain for the first time in his career. In the 2009–10 KHL season he was the team's leader in points among defencemen, scoring five goals and 20 assists in 43 games. In January 2010, Ozoliņš was selected to play on the starting roster for the Jaromír Jágr team in the KHL All-Star game. He was also selected to play in the KHL All-Star skills competition, but, due to a minor injury, only played in the first period and withdrew from the skills competition. On May 18, 2010, Ozoliņš extended his contract with Dinamo for another year, after he declined larger offers from four different KHL teams.

In the first month of the 2010–11 KHL season, Ozoliņš was honoured as the league's best defenceman after he registered one goal and 11 assists in 11 games, at the time being the league's leader in assists. He was injured in the November 28 game against Sibir Novosibirsk and missed all of the December due to broken ribs. In January 2011, Ozoliņš was again selected to play on the starting roster of the KHL All-Star game. Before the start of the 2011–12 KHL season Ozoliņš received an offer from the 2011 Gagarin Cup winners, Salavat Yulaev Ufa, but he declined it. During the 2011–12 KHL season, league officials confirmed Ozoliņš as captain of the Western Conference team in the All-Star Game 2012 (which took place on January 21, 2012) versus the Eastern Conference team captained by Sergei Fedorov. On July 12, 2012, Dinamo Riga board member Guntis Ulmanis told Latvian radio station Baltkom that Ozoliņš left the team as a free agent and could receive lucrative offers from Russian clubs. Since joining Riga, Ozoliņš had 22 goals and 65 assists in 158 regular season KHL appearances, serving as the team captain for every game. During his time with Dinamo Riga, Ozoliņš set several franchise records as a defenceman.

==== Atlant Moscow Oblast ====
On September 24, 2012, Ozoliņš signed a one-year deal with Atlant Moscow Oblast of the KHL. In his only season with Atlant in 2012–13, Ozoliņš was named team captain and immediately served as a fixture on the blueline, producing 2 goals and 20 points in 42 games.

==== Return home ====
In the off-season, Ozoliņš made another return as a free agent to Dinamo Riga, signing a one-year contract on May 8, 2013.

== Retirement ==
On May 27, 2014, during an interview on national television, Ozoliņš announced his retirement from professional ice hockey and planned to move into politics. However, he returned to Dinamo Riga as an assistant coach on October 31, 2016, and was promoted to head coach on May 29, 2017. On November 8, 2022, Ozoliņš was hired as an amateur scout for the NHL's Colorado Avalanche.

== International play ==
Medal record

Representing CIS

World Junior Championship
Gold medal – first place	1992 Germany	Ice hockey

Representing Soviet Union

World Junior Championship
Silver medal – second place	1991 Canada	Ice hockey

Ozoliņš, who was born in Latvia, and played internationally for the Soviet Union until 1991. His first major international tournament was the 1991 World Junior Championships, where he won a silver medal, losing in the gold medal game to Canada junior team. Following the breakup of the Soviet Union, he played for the CIS junior team and won a gold medal at the 1992 World Junior Championships. During the tournament, Soviet Union was formally dissolved and the team was renamed as the Commonwealth of Independent States national junior team. Because Ozoliņš and Sergei Zholtok were from Latvia, which was not a member of the CIS, some other teams protested, but the protest was denied.

Ozoliņš did not play again internationally until 1998 due to injuries and the NHL playoffs schedule. In 1998, after losing with the Avalanche to the Edmonton Oilers in the first round of the 1998 Stanley Cup playoffs, he was able to make his debut for Latvia senior team in the 1998 World Championship. In that tournament, he registered one goal and two assists. He the played for Latvia in the 2001 World Championship as the team finished the tournament in 13th place. He played in next year's championship as well as one game during the 2002 Winter Olympics. In the game against Slovakia, Ozoliņš registered four assists, helping Latvia to a 6–6 tie.

After a three-year absence, Ozoliņš helped Latvia qualify for the 2006 Winter Olympics. At the conclusion of the Winter Olympics. he announced his international retirement. However, he rejoined Latvia's team in their bid to qualify for the 2014 Winter Olympics. Ozoliņš served as captain during the 2014 Winter Olympics as Latvia finished eighth in the tournament.

== Personal life ==
Ozoliņš and his former wife have two sons. During the off-season Ozoliņš resided in Denver, and most recently in Jūrmala, Latvia. Ozoliņš was the owner of Vilki OP/LaRocca of the Riga Open Championship until it became defunct in 2006. He also owns other Latvian sports ventures, including Latvia's first 18-hole golf course, Ozo Golf Club. In December 2009, Ozoliņš was voted as 2009's most popular sportsman in Latvia by internet voters.

== Career statistics ==
=== Regular season and playoffs ===
			Regular season					Playoffs
Season	Team	League	GP	G	A	Pts	PIM	GP	G	A	Pts	PIM
1990–91	Dinamo Riga	Soviet	44	0	3	3	51	—	—	—	—	—
1991–92	Stars Riga	CIS	30	6	0	6	42	—	—	—	—	—
1991–92	Kansas City Blades	IHL	34	6	9	15	20	15	2	5	7	22
1992–93	San Jose Sharks	NHL	37	7	16	23	40	—	—	—	—	—
1993–94	San Jose Sharks	NHL	81	26	38	64	24	14	0	10	10	8
1994–95	San Jose Sharks	NHL	48	9	16	25	30	11	3	2	5	6
1995–96	San Francisco Spiders	IHL	2	1	0	1	0	—	—	—	—	—
1995–96	San Jose Sharks	NHL	7	1	3	4	4	—	—	—	—	—
1995–96	Colorado Avalanche	NHL	66	13	37	50	50	22	5	14	19	16
1996–97	Colorado Avalanche	NHL	80	23	45	68	88	17	4	13	17	24
1997–98	Colorado Avalanche	NHL	66	13	38	51	65	7	0	7	7	14
1998–99	Colorado Avalanche	NHL	39	7	25	32	22	19	4	8	12	22
1999–2000	Colorado Avalanche	NHL	82	16	36	52	46	17	5	5	10	20
2000–01	Carolina Hurricanes	NHL	72	12	32	44	71	6	0	2	2	5
2001–02	Carolina Hurricanes	NHL	46	4	19	23	34	—	—	—	—	—
2001–02	Florida Panthers	NHL	37	10	19	29	24	—	—	—	—	—
2002–03	Florida Panthers	NHL	51	7	19	26	40	—	—	—	—	—
2002–03	Mighty Ducks of Anaheim	NHL	31	5	13	18	16	21	2	6	8	10
2003–04	Mighty Ducks of Anaheim	NHL	36	5	11	16	24	—	—	—	—	—
2005–06	Mighty Ducks of Anaheim	NHL	17	3	3	6	8	—	—	—	—	—
2005–06	New York Rangers	NHL	14	2	10	12	12	3	0	0	0	6
2006–07	New York Rangers	NHL	21	0	3	3	8	—	—	—	—	—
2007–08	Worcester Sharks	AHL	2	0	1	1	0	—	—	—	—	—
2007–08	San Jose Sharks	NHL	39	3	13	16	24	—	—	—	—	—
2009–10	Dinamo Riga	KHL	43	5	20	25	109	6	0	3	3	24
2010–11	Dinamo Riga	KHL	41	6	26	32	62	11	0	7	7	12
2011–12	Dinamo Riga	KHL	50	10	10	20	28	7	1	1	2	2
2012–13	Atlant Moscow Oblast	KHL	42	2	18	20	26	5	0	1	1	2
2013–14	Dinamo Riga	KHL	48	5	17	22	46	7	0	2	2	24
NHL totals			875	167	397	564	638	137	23	67	90	131
KHL totals			224	28	89	117	271	36	1	14	15	64

=== International ===
Year	Team	Event	GP	G	A	Pts	PIM
1991	Soviet Union	WJC	7	1	2	3	6
1992	CIS	WJC	7	1	5	6	4
1998	Latvia	WC	4	1	2	3	4
2001	Latvia	WC	6	0	5	5	2
2002	Latvia	OG	1	0	4	4	0
2002	Latvia	WC	6	2	1	3	12
2005	Latvia	OGQ	3	0	1	1	4
2006	Latvia	OG	5	1	3	4	2
2013	Latvia	OGQ	3	0	0	0	2
2014	Latvia	OG	5	0	0	0	8
Junior totals			14	2	7	9	10
Senior totals			33	4	16	20	32

== Awards, honours and records ==
Award	Year
IHL
Turner Cup champion	1992
NHL
All-Star Game	1994, 1997, 1998, 2000, 2001, 2002, 2003
Stanley Cup champion	1996
First All-Star team	1997
KHL
All-Star Game	2010, 2011, 2012, 2014
First All-Star Team	2011
International
World Junior Championships silver medal	1991
World Junior Championships gold medal	1992
Spengler Cup silver medal	2011
Spengler Cup All-Star team	2011
IIHF All-Time Latvia Team	2020

=== Colorado Avalanche records ===
- Most all-time playoff goals by an Avalanche defenceman – 18
- Most all-time playoff assists by an Avalanche defenceman – 49
- Most all-time playoff points by an Avalanche defenceman – 67

Sporting positions
Preceded by Rodrigo Laviņš	Dinamo Riga captain 2009–2012	Succeeded by Guntis Galviņš
Olympic Games
Preceded by Martins Dukurs	Flagbearer for Latvia; Sochi 2014	Succeeded by Daumants Dreiškens
