= Danis Zaripov =

Russian ice hockey player (born 1981)

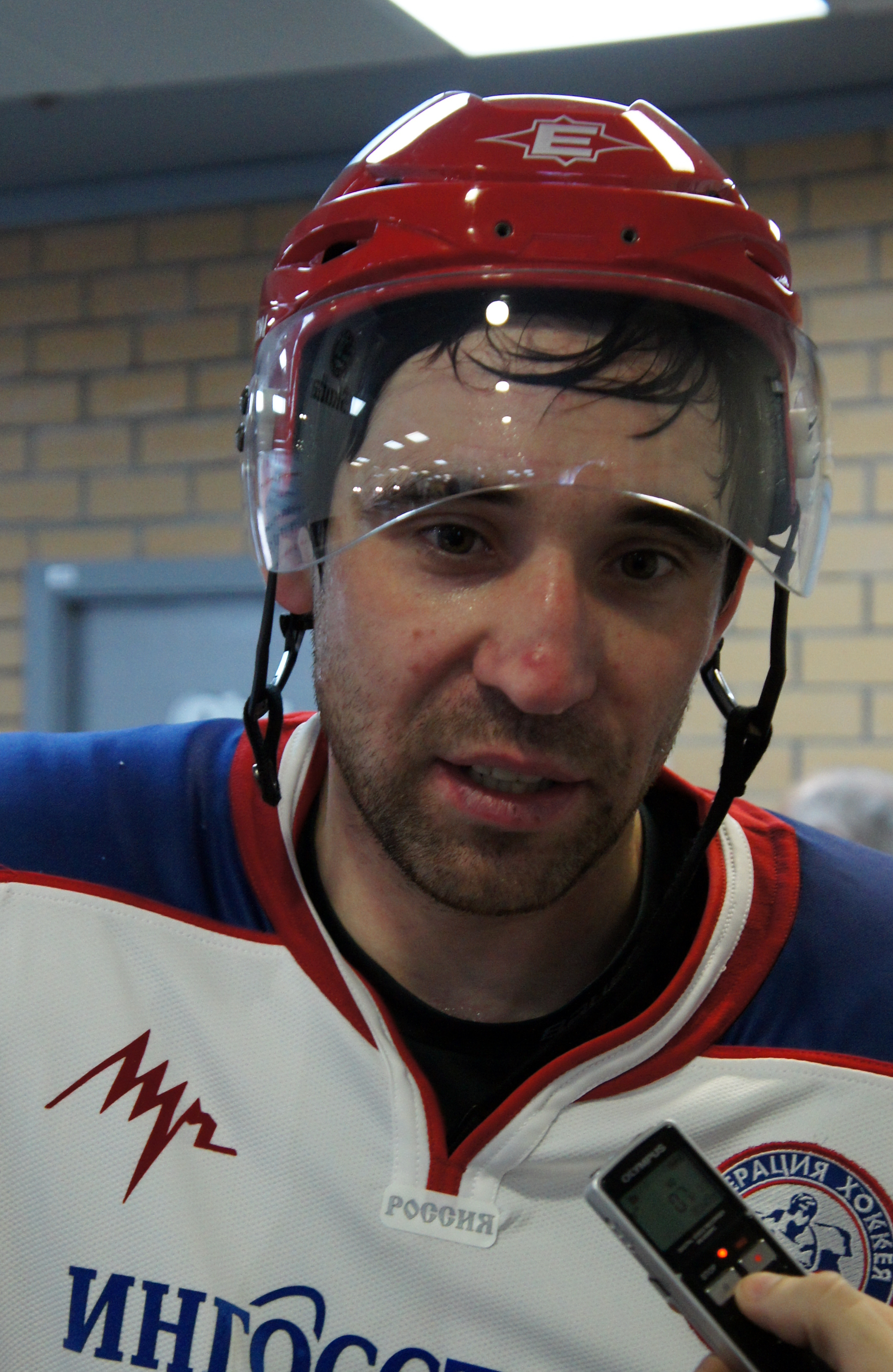
- Born: 26 March 1981 (age 45) Chelyabinsk, Russian SFSR, Soviet Union
- Height: 6 ft 0 in (183 cm)
- Weight: 194 lb (88 kg; 13 st 12 lb)
- Position: Left wing / Right wing
- Shot: Left
- Played for: Mechel Chelyabinsk; Ak Bars Kazan; Metallurg Magnitogorsk
- National team: Russia
- NHL draft: Undrafted
- Playing career: 1996–2023

Danis Zinnurovich Zaripov (Russian: Данис Зиннурович Зарипов, Tatar: Данис Зиннур улы Зарипов; born 26 March 1981) is a Russian former professional ice hockey left winger who played in the Kontinental Hockey League (KHL) with Ak Bars Kazan and Metallurg Magnitogorsk. Zaripov was also a member of the Russia men's national ice hockey team for the 2010 Winter Olympics.

== Playing career ==
Zaripov won the Gagarin Cup five times (2009, 2010, 2014, 2016, 2018). In 2017, Zaripov was banned from the IIHF through 2019 for testing positive for pseudoephedrine, an ingredient commonly found in allergy medicine and nasal decongestants. He had expressed interest in playing in the National Hockey League, which does not ban the substance, however continued his career in the KHL.

During the 2022–23 season, his 26th professional season, Zaripov having battled through injury and unable to rediscover his offensive contributions opted to immediately conclude his professional career, following captaining Ak Bars in a game against former club Metallurg Magnitogorsk, on 24 February 2023.

== Personal ==
He has a son Arthur and a daughter Veronika with his wife.

== Career statistics ==
=== Regular season and playoffs ===
			Regular season					Playoffs
Season	Team	League	GP	G	A	Pts	PIM	GP	G	A	Pts	PIM
1997–98	Mechel Chelyabinsk	RUS.2	10	0	0	0	14	—	—	—	—	—
1997–98	Mechel–2 Chelyabinsk	RUS.4	6	0	1	1	4	—	—	—	—	—
1998–99	Swift Current Broncos	WHL	62	23	8	31	33	6	0	1	1	6
1999–00	Mechel Chelyabinsk	RSL	37	5	7	12	14	3	1	0	1	2
1999–00	Mechel–2 Chelyabinsk	RUS.3	6	8	1	9	4	—	—	—	—	—
2000–01	Mechel Chelyabinsk	RSL	42	9	6	15	20	3	0	0	0	0
2000–01	Mechel–2 Chelyabinsk	RUS.3	5	5	2	7	4	—	—	—	—	—
2001–02	Ak Bars Kazan	RSL	42	3	6	9	14	—	—	—	—	—
2001–02	Ak Bars–2 Kazan	RUS.3	4	6	1	7	6	—	—	—	—	—
2002–03	Ak Bars Kazan	RSL	48	16	10	26	18	5	0	0	0	0
2003–04	Ak Bars Kazan	RSL	52	8	5	13	20	8	1	1	2	4
2003–04	Ak Bars–2 Kazan	RUS.3	1	3	0	3	0	—	—	—	—	—
2004–05	Ak Bars Kazan	RSL	56	13	12	25	16	4	0	0	0	0
2004–05	Ak Bars–2 Kazan	RUS.3	4	5	0	5	0	—	—	—	—	—
2005–06	Ak Bars Kazan	RSL	49	14	25	39	36	13	3	5	8	2
2006–07	Ak Bars Kazan	RSL	53	32	30	62	30	16	10	7	17	4
2007–08	Ak Bars Kazan	RSL	57	21	34	55	38	10	3	6	9	20
2008–09	Ak Bars Kazan	KHL	56	34	31	65	26	21	6	10	16	8
2009–10	Ak Bars Kazan	KHL	52	16	26	42	58	1	0	1	1	2
2010–11	Ak Bars Kazan	KHL	40	18	19	37	18	9	4	3	7	2
2011–12	Ak Bars Kazan	KHL	53	25	19	44	48	12	4	5	9	4
2012–13	Ak Bars Kazan	KHL	46	19	17	36	14	12	4	2	6	8
2013–14	Metallurg Magnitogorsk	KHL	53	25	39	64	32	21	11	15	26	34
2014–15	Metallurg Magnitogorsk	KHL	60	24	40	64	40	10	5	6	11	2
2015–16	Metallurg Magnitogorsk	KHL	60	22	32	54	26	23	6	9	15	14
2016–17	Metallurg Magnitogorsk	KHL	56	16	29	45	16	18	15	7	22	18
2017–18	Ak Bars Kazan	KHL	13	3	7	10	4	16	2	9	11	0
2018–19	Ak Bars Kazan	KHL	48	9	23	32	18	3	0	2	2	6
2019–20	Ak Bars Kazan	KHL	52	13	14	27	16	—	—	—	—	—
2020–21	Ak Bars Kazan	KHL	35	7	16	23	40	5	0	0	0	0
2021–22	Ak Bars Kazan	KHL	24	4	7	11	12	3	0	1	1	0
2022–23	Ak Bars Kazan	KHL	15	0	3	3	2	—	—	—	—	—
RSL totals			446	121	134	255	220	62	18	19	37	32
KHL totals			663	235	322	557	370	154	57	71	128	98

=== International ===
Medal record

Representing Russia

Ice hockey

World Championships
Gold medal – first place	2008 Canada	
Gold medal – first place	2009 Switzerland	
Gold medal – first place	2014 Belarus	
Silver medal – second place	2015 Czech Republic	

Year	Team	Event	Result	GP	G	A	Pts	PIM
2006	Russia	WC	5th	6	2	3	5	4
2007	Russia	WC	3rd place, bronze medalist(s)	9	3	9	12	6
2008	Russia	WC	1st place, gold medalist(s)	8	3	4	7	0
2009	Russia	WC	1st place, gold medalist(s)	2	2	1	3	0
2010	Russia	OG	6th	4	2	0	2	2
2011	Russia	WC	4th	9	1	5	6	0
2014	Russia	WC	1st place, gold medalist(s)	10	3	10	13	6
2015	Russia	WC	2nd place, silver medalist(s)	1	1	2	3	0
Senior totals				49	17	34	51	18

== Awards and honors ==
Award	Year
RSL
Champion (Ak Bars Kazan)	2006
Kubok Pervogo Kanala	2006
KHL
All-Star Game	2009, 2010, 2014, 2015, 2016, 2017
First All-Star Team	2009, 2014
Golden Stick (MVP)	2009
Iron Man Award	2009, 2016
Gagarin Cup (Ak Bars Kazan)	2009, 2010, 2018
Gagarin Cup (Metallurg Magnitogorsk)	2014, 2016
