= Kontinental Hockey League All-Star Game =

Annual exhibition ice hockey game

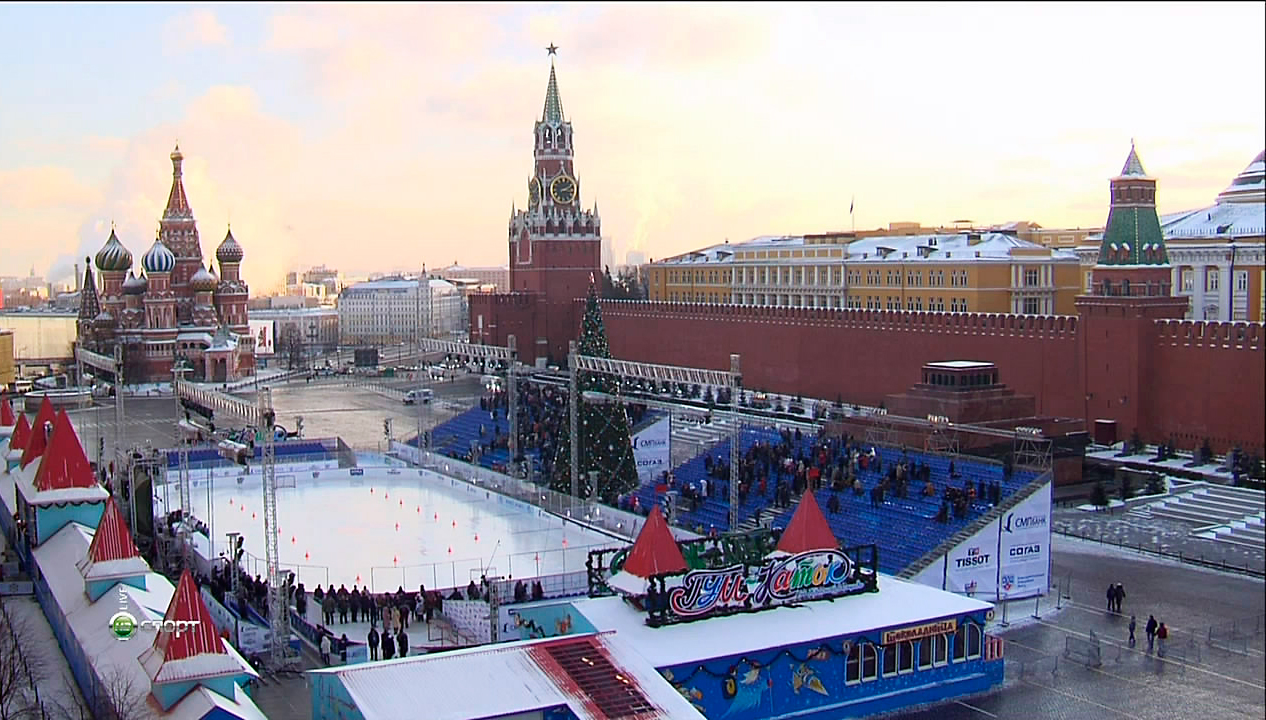
Outdoor All-Star game in Moscow

The Kontinental Hockey League All-Star Game (Russian: Матч всех звёзд Континентальной хоккейной лиги) is an exhibition ice hockey game that marks the midway point of the Kontinental Hockey League's regular season, with many of the league's star players playing against each other. The starting lineup for the two teams, including the starting goaltender, is voted on by fans, while the secondary lines and goaltenders are voted upon by the media. At 2019 it was the first time that Wisehockey realtime tracking system was used in KHL All-Star Game.

== Editions ==
Edition	Date	Venue	Team 1 Captain	Score	Team 2 Captain
2009	10 January	(Russia) Red Square, Moscow	Team World (Czech Republic) Jaromír Jágr	7–6	Team Russia; Alexei Yashin
2010	30 January	(Belarus) Minsk-Arena, Minsk	Team World (Czech Republic) Jaromír Jágr	11–8	Team Russia; Alexei Yashin
2011	5 February	(Russia) Ice Palace, Saint Petersburg	Team East (Czech Republic) Jaromír Jágr	18–16	Team West (Russia) Alexei Yashin
2012	21 January	(Latvia) Arena Riga, Riga	Team East (Russia) Sergei Fedorov	15–11	Team West (Latvia) Sandis Ozoliņš
2013	13 January	(Russia) Traktor Sport Palace, Chelyabinsk	Team East (Russia) Aleksey Morozov	18–11	Team West (Russia) Ilya Kovalchuk
2014	11 January	(Slovakia) Slovnaft Arena, Bratislava	Team West (Russia) Ilya Kovalchuk	18–16	Team East (Russia) Sergei Mozyakin
2015	25 January	(Russia) Bolshoy Ice Dome, Sochi	Team West (Russia) Ilya Kovalchuk	16–18	Team East (Russia) Danis Zaripov
2016	23 January	(Russia) VTB Ice Palace, Moscow	Team West (Russia) Alexander Radulov	28–23	Team East (Russia) Sergei Mozyakin
2017 (Final)	22 January	(Russia) Ufa Arena, Ufa	Chernyshev Division (Russia) Evgeny Medvedev	3–2	Tarasov Division (Russia) Maxim Afinogenov
2018 (Final)	10 January	(Kazakhstan) Barys Arena, Astana	Tarasov Division (Russia) Dmitri Kagarlitsky	5–4	Chernyshev Division (Kazakhstan) Nigel Dawes
2019 (Final)	20 January	(Russia) TatNeft Arena, Kazan	Bobrov Division (Slovakia) Július Hudáček	3–4	Chernyshev Division (Russia) Igor Bobkov
2020 (Final)	19 January	(Russia) VTB Indoor Arena, Moscow	Bobrov Division (Russia) Vadim Shipachyov	7–6	Tarasov Division (Russia) Kirill Kaprizov
2021	Cancelled due to the COVID-19 pandemic	(Latvia) Arena Riga, Riga	Cancelled due to the COVID-19 pandemic		
2022 (Final)	10-11 December	(Russia) Traktor Ice Arena, Chelyabinsk	Bobrov Division (Russia) Alexander Nikishin	7-6	Kharlamov Division (Russia) Anton Burdasov
2023 (Final)	9-10 December	(Russia) SKA Arena, St Petersburg	Kharlamov Division	8-7 (SO)	Bobrov Division (Russia) Nikolay Goldobin
2025 (Final)	8-9 February	(Russia) Sibir Arena, Novosibirsk	Chernyshev Division	9-8	Bobrov Division
2026	7-8 February	(Russia) UMMC Arena, Yekaterinburg	KHL RUS Stars	9-2	KHL U23 Stars
2027	6-7 February	(Belarus) Minsk-Arena, Minsk			

== Legends game ==
Edition	Date	Venue	Team 1	Score	Team 2
2012	20 January	(Latvia) Arena Riga, Riga	Balderis team Legends of Latvia	7–11	Fetisov team Russian legends
2013	12 January	(Russia) Traktor Sport Palace, Chelyabinsk	Makarov team Legends of Chelyabinsk	4–4	Fetisov team Russian legends
2014	10 January	(Slovakia) Slovnaft Arena, Bratislava	Rusnák team Legends of Czechoslovakia	7–8; OT	Yakushev team Russian legends
2015	25 January	(Russia) Bolshoy Ice Dome, Sochi	Kamensky team Olympic legends	3–5	Kovalenko team Olympic legends
2019	25 January	(Russia) TatNeft Arena, Kazan	Ak Bars Veterans	8–4	KHL Legends
