= 2013 Kontinental Hockey League All-Star Game =

2013 KHL All-Star Game
	1	2	3	Total
Team East	6	7	5	18
Team West	3	3	5	11
- Date: 13 January 2013
- Arena: Traktor Sport Palace
- City: Chelyabinsk, Russia
- Attendance: 6,500

The 2013 Kontinental Hockey League All-Star Game was the All-Star game for the 2012–13 season of the Kontinental Hockey League (KHL). It took place on 13 January 2013 at the Traktor Sport Palace in Chelyabinsk, Russia, and resulted in Team East, captained by Aleksey Morozov, winning 18–11 over Team West, captained by Ilya Kovalchuk.

== See also ==
- 2012–13 KHL season
- Kontinental Hockey League All-Star Game
