= 2015 Kontinental Hockey League All-Star Game =

2015 KHL All-Star Game
	1	2	3	Total
Team East	5	7	6	18
Team West	6	3	7	16
- Date: 25 January 2015
- Arena: Bolshoy Ice Dome
- City: Sochi, Russia
- Attendance: 12,000

The 2015 Kontinental Hockey League All-Star Game was the All-Star game for the 2014–15 season of the Kontinental Hockey League (KHL). It took place on 25 January 2015 at the Bolshoy Ice Dome in Sochi, Russia, and resulted in Team East, captained by Danis Zaripov, winning 18–16 over Team West, captained by Ilya Kovalchuk.

== See also ==
- 2014–15 KHL season
- Kontinental Hockey League All-Star Game
