= Alexei Morozov =

Russian ice hockey player (born 1977)

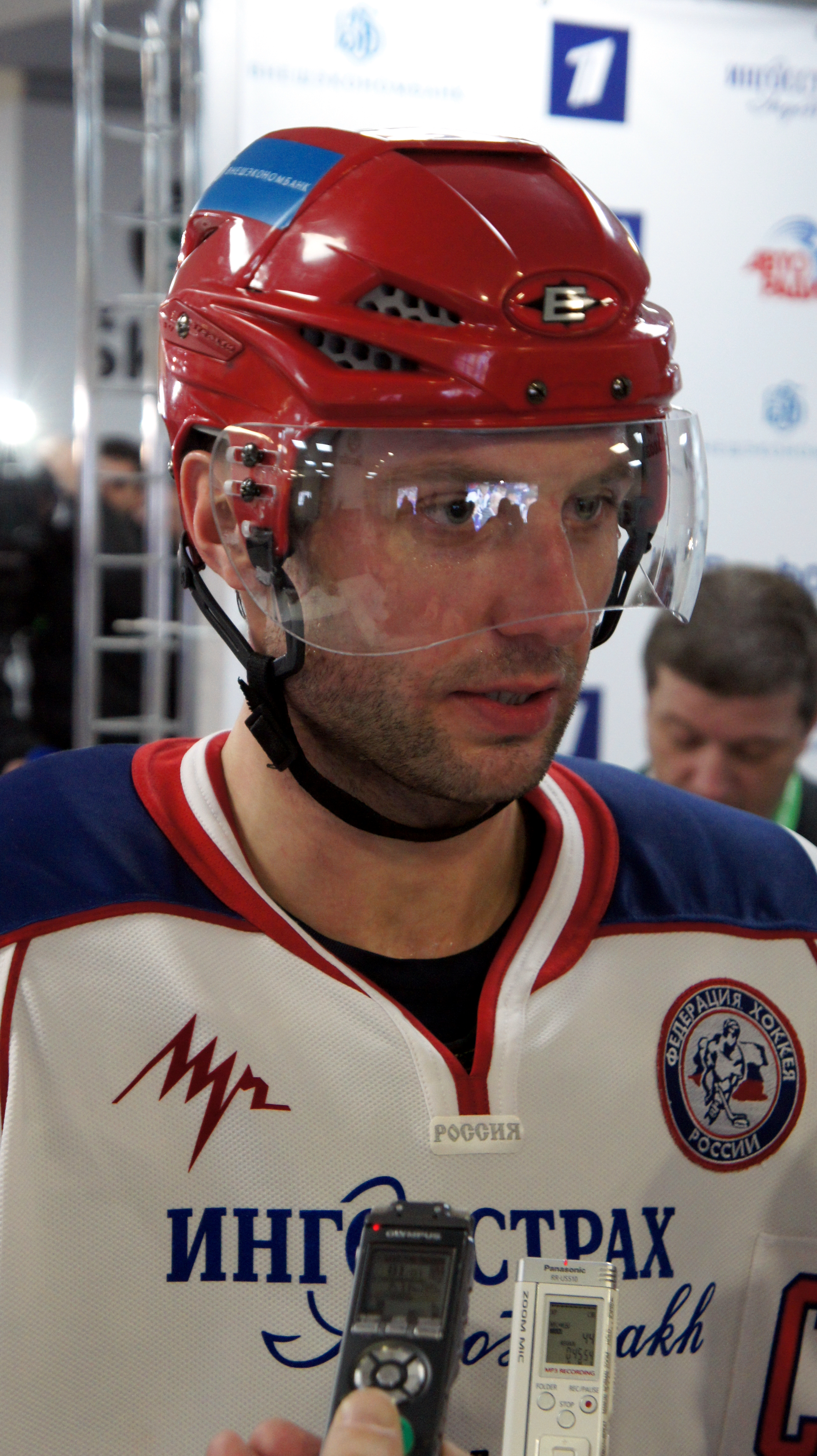
- Morozov in 2010
- Born: 16 February 1977 (age 49) Moscow, Russian SFSR, Soviet Union
- Height: 6 ft 1 in (185 cm)
- Weight: 204 lb (93 kg; 14 st 8 lb)
- Position: Right wing
- Shot: Left
- Played for: Krylya Sovetov Moscow; Pittsburgh Penguins; Ak Bars Kazan; CSKA Moscow
- National team: Russia
- NHL draft: 24th overall, 1995; Pittsburgh Penguins
- Playing career: 1993–2014

Alexei Alekseyevich Morozov (Russian: Алексей Алексе́евич Морозов; born 16 February 1977) is the president of the Kontinental Hockey League and a Russian former professional ice hockey player.

He played professional hockey with the Pittsburgh Penguins in the National Hockey League (NHL) and in the Kontinental Hockey League (KHL) with Ak Bars Kazan and CSKA Moscow.

He is the former captain of the Russian national team, having held the post from 2007 to 2011, with the team winning 2 gold, 1 silver (missed tournament due to injury, Kovalchuk captained) and 1 bronze medal at the World Championships during this time. He was succeeded, as national team captain, by his Ak Bars team mate Ilya Nikulin, in 2012.

== Playing career ==
As a youth, Morozov played in the 1991 Quebec International Pee-Wee Hockey Tournament with a minor ice hockey team from Moscow.

=== Pittsburgh Penguins ===
Morozov was drafted in the first round, 24th overall, by the Pittsburgh Penguins in the 1995 NHL entry draft. After being drafted, he remained in Russia and did not join the Penguins until the 1997–98 NHL season. Morozov began his career much like Pittsburgh legend Mario Lemieux, scoring on his first shot on his first shift of his first game as a Penguin. He played seven seasons for the Penguins, totaling 451 games, 84 goals, and 219 points.

In his seven-year NHL career, Morozov earned the nickname The Devil Killer for his notorious success against the New Jersey Devils. In fact, New Jersey goaltender Martin Brodeur in an interview before a Penguins/Devils game on Fox Sports Net jokingly stated that he had nightmares of Morozov each night before his club would play the Penguins. Brodeur also stated in an interview with ESPN's Dan Patrick that Morozov is the player that he would not like to see coming in on him on a breakaway adding " The kid's got probably over 25 percent of his career goals on me. It's unbelievable." when asked to explain Morozov's success against him Brodeur added " I don't know. If you figure it out, please tell me. When he shoots the puck, I never catch it really clean. When he's going to make a pass, I think he's shooting. When he's shooting, I think he's making a pass. The guy's in my kitchen. He's in my head. I can't get rid of him." He also won an Olympic Silver Medal on the 1998 Russian Olympic Team during his rookie year with the Penguins. Despite these successes, Morozov never fully developed into the player he had the potential to be as he played a majority of his first few seasons in the NHL on the third and fourth lines due to the tremendous depth of a talent laden Penguins team that included stars such as Mario Lemieux, Jaromír Jágr, Alexei Kovalev, Martin Straka and Robert Lang among others.

He finally got his chance on the starting line during the 2002–03 season and the KLM line of Kovalev, Lemieux and Morozov led the Penguins to a top three record in the conference the first third of the season before being dismantled by injuries and trades. After bursting onto the scene with 25 points in 27 games, Morozov suffered a fractured wrist by a crushing hit that ended his season and Lemieux became bogged down by back problems which forced him to call it a year. Kovalev was later traded at the NHL trade deadline to the New York Rangers.

The next season saw Morozov off to a slow start, mainly due to injury and the lack of talent on a young Penguins team. However, down the stretch of the 2003–04 season, Morozov was instrumental to the Penguins late season success, leading the team with five game-winning goals, including two in the final three games of the season as well as netting 20 points in the final 15 games. He would also finish the season leading all Penguins forwards in points.

=== Ak Bars Kazan ===
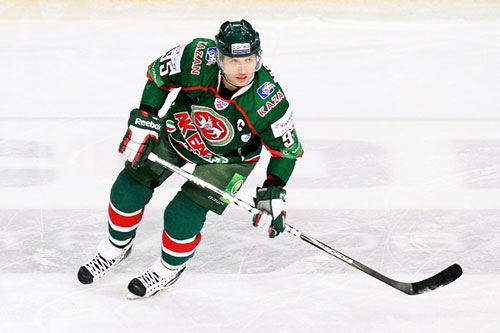
Morozov with Ak Bars Kazan in 2011–12

During the 2004–05 NHL lockout, Morozov went back to Russia to hone his skills and play for the Ak Bars Kazan of the Russian Superleague (RSL), for whom he has played since. He would see significant ice-time on a talent laden Ak-Bars team that included NHL stars such as Vincent Lecavalier, Dany Heatley, Ilya Kovalchuk, Brad Richards and Nik Antropov. Despite these marquee NHL names, it would be Morozov who would go on to lead the club in scoring with 46 points.

==== 2005–06 season ====
With the NHL's future still up in the air, Morozov signed a one-year contract with Kazan in hopes to build upon his previous season's success. The 2005–06 season proved a great one for Morozov, where he finished the regular season leading the league in goals (23) and being second in points (49) after Sergei Mozyakin (52) while leading Ak Bars to its first championship win in nearly ten years. He was instrumental in his team's long playoff run, amassing 26 points (13 goals, 13 assists) in just 13 games en route to Playoff MVP. He was also qualified for six other RSL league awards, two of which he won.

As they built on their chemistry from the 2004–05 season that eventually led to dominance during the 2005–06 season, the Kazan line of Sergei Zinovjev, Danis Zaripov, and Morozov himself came to be known throughout the world as the ZZM Line. During the 2006 RSL playoff run, the ZZM Line amassed 51 points in just 13 games. Although they would only see one more full season together after 2005–06 due to injuries, the ZZM Line has been widely regarded as the best European line produced since the Cold War Era for their championship style of play leading Ak-Bars to one RSL championship, one KHL championship, one European Cup Championship, and Team Russia to two Gold Medal World Championships.

The off-season choice of whether to remain in the RSL or return to the NHL was a very difficult one for Morozov, as he wanted to join his compatriots Evgeni Malkin and Alexander Semin in the NHL but he also had a great relationship and close ties with Ak Bars. However, in the end, Morozov chose to sign an undisclosed contract to stay with his Russian club in hopes of winning back-to-back championships.

==== 2006–07 ====
When the regular season ended, Morozov led the league and established new Super League record in points (83) as Ak Bars Kazan had a league leading 119 points and well on the way to a second straight championship. He became the first and only player in the history of the RSL to top the eighty points in a season and his 83 points broke the old record of 79 held by Sergei Makarov. This is a record that will stand the test of time as in just two more years the RSL would be replaced by a greater league spanning four countries. After quickly dispatching of Metallurg Novokuznetsk in the opening round in three games, Ak Bars then defeated Khimik Moscow Oblast and CSKA Moscow in four games each to advance to the finals to face Metallurg Magnitogorsk. In a final decisive game five, Ak Bars would come up short losing the final game by the score of 2–1. Despite not matching his stellar numbers of the 2005–06 season, Morozov finished the playoffs with a league leading 15 assists in 14 games.

During the International Ice Hockey Federation (IIHF) European Championship Cup (ECC) in January 2007, Morozov earned the titles of best forward and MVP as he led Ak Bars to the championship by defeating the SM-liiga club HPK 6–0, reaffirming Russian dominance at the tournament.

Shortly after the 2006–07 RSL season ended, Morozov was chosen to represent Russia as an Alternate Captain at the International Hockey World Championship (IHWC). Despite missing two games to a minor knee injury, in just seven games he finished first in goals with eight while finishing second in points as well as capturing the title of best forward at the tournament.

==== 2007–08 ====
The following and final RSL season proved another successful one for Morozov as he continued his dominance of the league by finishing in the tops in scoring and leading Ak Bars to the playoffs once again but would come up one game and one goal short of the finals in another heartbreaking 4–3 loss to Salavat Yulaev Ufa. The 2007–08 RSL season would be the last in the league's history, as it would be replaced by the newly formed Kontinental Hockey League (KHL) at the start of the 2008–09 season. The KHL comprised the 20 current teams from the RSL, as well as Avtomobilist Ekaterinburg of the Vysshaya Liga, Barys Astana from Kazakhstan, Dynamo Minsk from Belarus, as well as a team from Latvia based in Riga known as Dinamo Riga.

Due to his previous year's success with the Russian national team at the 2007 World Championship, Morozov was chosen as captain of the 2008 squad. With Morozov in the lineup the previous year, Russia went undefeated until he suffered a knee injury and the 2007 squad without their alternate captain would finish 1–1 and fall short of the Gold once again. However, with Morozov as their captain and in the lineup, Russia would go undefeated once again and capture the Gold by defeating Canada in a thrilling overtime contest 5–4. The gold medal score was Russia's first in 15 years and would be Russia's 24th overall, tying Canada for the most gold medals by any county. The 2008 IIHF World Championship also marked 100 years of World Championship hockey.

==== 2008–09 ====
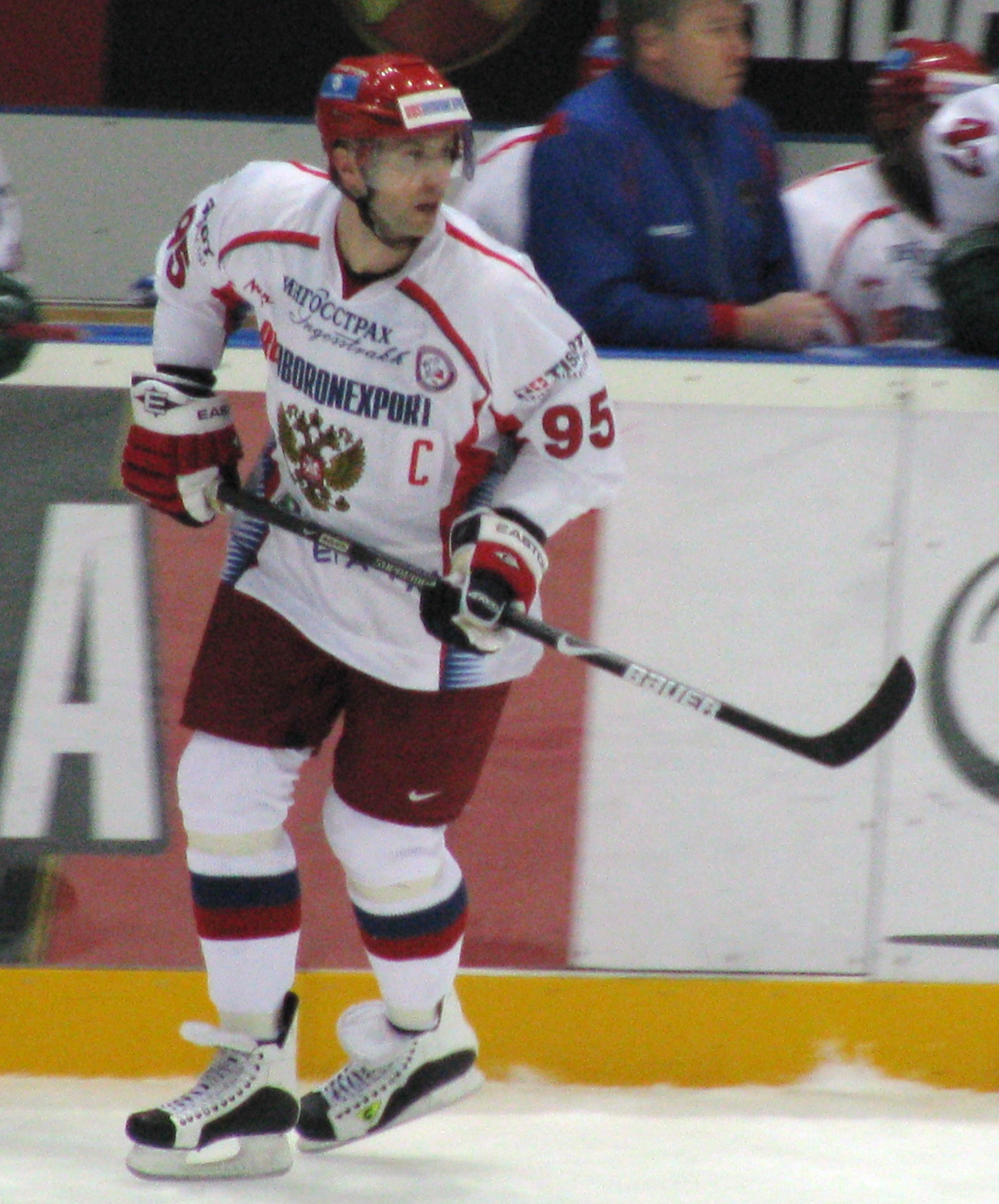
Morozov with the Russian team in a game versus the Czech Republic

In 2008, his Russian club Ak Bars Kazan joined the Kontinetal Hockey League. Although Morozov was limited to only 49 games due to a freak head-on collision with Atlant Moscow goaltender Ray Emery, he finished second in scoring with 70 points (32 goals and 38 assists). Following the season's end, Ak Bars swept Barys Astana in the Round of 16 and defeat them in season series 3–0. In the quarterfinals they would face the talent-laden Avangard Omsk and dispatch them in a final decisive game five 3–2 in overtime.

For the semifinals and finals matches, the playoff series length was increased to seven games for the final four teams in it and in their semifinal match-up, Kazan defeated Dynamo Moscow 4–2 and would go on to face Lokomotiv Yaroslavl in the finals, making it the third time in five years that Ak Bars has made it to the finals. Although Ak Bars would get off to a slow start, getting outscored in their first three games by a combined score of 9–4, including two shutout losses, they and captain Aleksey Morozov would turn it on when it mattered. Finding themselves down 3–2 in the series, Ak Bars would snatch game six away from Lokomotiv in overtime and in the final decisive game seven their captain provided all the offense the team needed as Morozov scored the lone goal in a 1–0 victory, making Kazan the first team to ever capture the Gagarin Cup and first-ever KHL champions.

Due to his success in the KHL as well as his previous success in captaining Russia to a World Championship, Morozov was again chosen as captain for the 2009 IHWC squad. He would not disappoint, and Russia would go on to defeat their opponents in the opening rounds of play and would find themselves in a rematch of the previous year's championship game against Canada; Russia defeated Canada 2–1, giving them the most Gold Medals by any country, with 25. From 2006 to 2009, Team Russia was a perfect 21–0 with Morozov in their lineup in World Championship hockey.

==== 2009–10 ====
Morozov was chosen as captain for Team Russia at the 2010 Winter Olympics, as well as the flagbearer for the Russian Olympic Team. Despite a talented roster, Team Russia would fall to eventual Olympic Gold champion Canada in the opening elimination round. As of 2010, Canada and Russia stand tied with the most gold medals of any ice hockey national team with 25 between Olympic and World Championship tournaments.

Despite the devastating Olympic loss, Morozov did not let it bother him on the ice as he led Ak-Bars to their second straight Gagarin Cup as KHL champions. The 2009–10 season was an up and down one for Morozov as he battled injuries down the stretch in the second half of the KHL season where he missed several key playoff games and even had to miss the 2010 World Championships, where Team Russia would lose for the first time in over 3 years without their Captain and have to settle for Silver.

The injury bug would plague Morozov down the stretch of Ak-Bars KHL playoff run as well; however, due in large part to his leadership on and off the ice, Ak-Bars would capture their second consecutive Gagarin Cup as KHL champions. This victory made Ak-Bars the first club in the KHL to not only win the Gagarin Cup but to win the trophy twice and back-to-back.

==== 2010–2013 seasons ====
The 2010–11 season would prove another successful one for Morozov as he was amongst the KHL league leaders in points once more with 56; averaging over a point-per-game for the fourth and final time in his professional career. Although Ak-Bars failed to capture their third straight Gagarin Cup, Morozov had yet another successful playoff season with 5 goals, 9 points in just 9 games.

Morozov strung together another excellent season during the 2011–12 campaign where he scored over 50 points for the sixth and final time in his professional ice hockey career and amassed over 20 goals for the tenth and final time in his professional career. Although Ak-Bars would bow out early in the KHL playoffs, Morozov scored 4 goals, 6 points in just 5 games cementing his place as one of league's best all-time clutch performers.

The 2012–13 season was a successful one for Ak-Bars as they enjoyed a long playoff run before falling one win shy of reaching the Gagarin Cup Finals for the first time since 2010 when they lost to Traktor Chelyabinsk in Game 7 of the Eastern Conference Finals. Although they wouldn't capture their third Gagarin Cup, the Ak-Bars captain lead the way scoring an impressive 15 points in 18 games in his final season with the club.

=== CSKA Moscow ===
In May 2013, it was announced that Morozov had signed a two-year contract with CSKA Moscow. He was named captain of the team later that summer.

On August 24, 2014, after battling through injuries during the 2013-2014 campaign, Morozov announced that he was retiring from professional ice hockey. He leaves behind an impressive legacy as one of Russia's most gifted offensive players of all time as well as several Soviet/Russian league records from his years playing in the CIS, RSL, and KHL.

Among these numerous records and awards are the Russian league record for most points in a season with 83 for his outstanding 2006-07 campaign as well as three championship titles, two of which he earned playoff MVP. Morozov will also be remembered for his outstanding international play helping Team Russia to two World Championship Gold Medals in which he captained the club, a European Championship where he was also team captain, and an Olympic Silver Medal. Morozov has also earned several individual international awards such as Best Forward at the WJC in 1994, Best Forward at the IHWC in 2007, and Best Forward and Most Valuable Player at the ECC in 2007.

== Honours ==
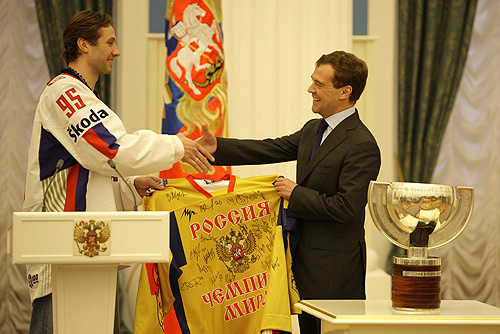
- Morozov at the Moscow Kremlin with Dmitry Medvedev

Medal record

Representing Russia

Men's ice hockey

Olympic Games
Silver medal – second place	1998 Nagano	

World Championships
Gold medal – first place	2009 Switzerland	
Gold medal – first place	2008 Canada	
Bronze medal – third place	2007 Russia	

World Junior Championships
Bronze medal – third place	1997 Switzerland	
Bronze medal – third place	1996 United States	

- CIS - Rookie of the Year: 1994–95
- World Junior Championship All-Star 1996
- Best Best Forward at WJC 1997
- Olympic Silver Medal (Russia): 1998
- Russian Super League Championship: 2006
- Ceska Pojistovna: 2006
- Kubok Pervogo Kanala: 2006
- RSL Goal Scoring Champion: 2006
- RSL Playoff MVP: 2006
- European Champions: 2007
- Best Forward (ECC): 2007
- Most Valuable Player (ECC): 2007
- RSL Goal Scoring Champion: 2007
- RSL MVP: 2007
- Best Forward (IHWC): 2007
- All-Star Team (IHWC): 2007
- World Championship (Russia): 2008
- Gagarin Cup: 2009
- KHL Playoff MVP: 2009
- World Championship (Russia): 2009
- Gagarin Cup: 2010

== Career statistics ==
=== Regular season and playoffs ===
			Regular season					Playoffs
Season	Team	League	GP	G	A	Pts	PIM	GP	G	A	Pts	PIM
1993–94	Krylya Sovetov Moscow	IHL	7	0	0	0	0	3	0	0	0	0
1993–94	Krylia Sovetov–2 Moscow	RUS.2	49	15	11	26	30	—	—	—	—	—
1994–95	Krylya Sovetov Moscow	IHL	48	15	12	27	53	4	0	3	3	0
1995–96	Krylya Sovetov Moscow	IHL	47	13	9	22	26	—	—	—	—	—
1996–97	Krylya Sovetov Moscow	RSL	44	21	11	32	32	2	0	1	1	2
1997–98	Krylya Sovetov Moscow	RSL	6	2	1	3	4	—	—	—	—	—
1997–98	Pittsburgh Penguins	NHL	76	13	13	26	8	6	0	1	1	2
1998–99	Pittsburgh Penguins	NHL	67	9	10	19	14	10	1	1	2	0
1999–2000	Pittsburgh Penguins	NHL	68	12	19	31	14	5	0	0	0	0
2000–01	Pittsburgh Penguins	NHL	66	5	14	19	6	18	3	3	6	6
2001–02	Pittsburgh Penguins	NHL	72	20	29	49	16	—	—	—	—	—
2002–03	Pittsburgh Penguins	NHL	27	9	16	25	16	—	—	—	—	—
2003–04	Pittsburgh Penguins	NHL	75	16	34	50	24	—	—	—	—	—
2004–05	Ak Bars Kazan	RSL	58	20	26	46	30	4	0	1	1	2
2005–06	Ak Bars Kazan	RSL	51	23	26	49	69	13	13	13	26	8
2006–07	Ak Bars Kazan	RSL	53	34	49	83	36	14	2	15	17	6
2007–08	Ak Bars Kazan	RSL	57	30	33	63	34	10	4	7	11	8
2008–09	Ak Bars Kazan	KHL	49	32	39	71	22	21	8	11	19	12
2009–10	Ak Bars Kazan	KHL	50	26	23	49	24	18	5	7	12	6
2010–11	Ak Bars Kazan	KHL	53	21	35	56	24	9	5	4	9	3
2011–12	Ak Bars Kazan	KHL	53	21	29	50	24	5	4	2	6	6
2012–13	Ak Bars Kazan	KHL	51	12	26	37	20	18	6	9	15	4
2013–14	CSKA Moscow	KHL	38	13	10	23	30	4	0	0	0	0
KHL/RSL/IHL totals			665	283	329	612	424	125	47	73	120	56
NHL totals			451	84	135	219	98	39	4	5	9	8

=== International ===
Year	Team	Event	Result	GP	G	A	Pts	PIM
1995	Russia	EJC	4th	5	3	2	5	6
1996	Russia	WJC	3rd place, bronze medalist(s)	7	5	3	8	2
1997	Russia	WJC	3rd place, bronze medalist(s)	6	5	3	8	6
1997	Russia	WC	4th	9	3	3	6	2
1998	Russia	OG	2nd place, silver medalist(s)	6	2	2	4	0
1998	Russia	WC	5th	4	0	3	3	2
2004	Russia	WC	10th	6	1	1	2	4
2007	Russia	WC	3rd place, bronze medalist(s)	7	8	5	13	6
2008	Russia	WC	1st place, gold medalist(s)	8	5	2	7	4
2009	Russia	WC	1st place, gold medalist(s)	9	1	4	5	0
2010	Russia	OG	6th	4	2	0	2	0
2011	Russia	WC	4th	9	1	3	4	8
Junior totals				18	13	8	21	14
Senior totals				62	23	23	46	26

Preceded by Chris Wells	Pittsburgh Penguins first-round draft pick 1995	Succeeded by Craig Hillier
Olympic Games
Preceded by Dmitry Dorofeyev	Flagbearer for Russia; Vancouver 2010	Succeeded by Alexandr Zubkov
