= Ak Bars Kazan =

Russian ice hockey team based in Kazan

- City: Kazan, Russia
- League: Kontinental Hockey League
- Conference: Eastern
- Division: Kharlamov
- Founded: 1956
- Home arena: TatNeft Arena (capacity: 8,900)
- Colours: Green, white, red, silver
- Owner: Tatneft
- General manager: Marat Valiullin
- Head coach: Anvar Gatiyatulin
- Captain: Alexei Marchenko
- Affiliates: Bars Kazan (VHL); Neftyanik Almetievsk (VHL); Irbis Kazan (MHL)
- Website: ak-bars.ru

Franchise history
- Ak Bars Kazan 1996–present Itil Kazan 1990–1996; SC Uritskogo Kazan 1958–1990; Mashstroy Kazan 1956–1958

Hockey Club Ak Bars (Russian and Tatar: Ак Барс, lit. 'Snow Leopard'), also known as Ak Bars Kazan, is a Russian professional ice hockey club based in Kazan, Tatarstan. It is a member of the Kharlamov Division in the Kontinental Hockey League (KHL). The club was founded in 1956 as Mashstroy Kazan and adopted its current name in 1996. It won the Russian Superleague in 1998 and 2006.

== History ==
Founded as Mashstroy Kazan in 1956, the name was later changed to SC Uritskogo Kazan when it entered the Soviet Class B league in 1958. It was promoted to Soviet Class A2, where it gained promotion to the top tier of Soviet hockey. Kazan's performance was respectable, starting the season by winning 6 out of 19 games against the best of the Soviet teams before falling away in the second half of the season and was demoted. Twice they won the USSR League (lower tiers), being named Champion of Russia in 1962 and 1976.

SC Uritskogo Kazan's most successful period occurred in the late 1970s and early 1980s. Following the breakup of the Soviet Union, Uritskogo Kazan became Itil Kazan in 1990 and participated in the IHL. Itil was only mildly successful, narrowly avoiding relegation to the Vysshaya Liga in 1991 and 1992.

It was following the establishment of the Russian Superleague (RSL) in 1996 that the golden age of hockey in Tatarstan began. Renamed Ak Bars Kazan after the traditional symbol of the Tatars, the snow leopard. Benefiting from the resources boom in the Urals, Ak Bars began its history in fine form, finishing first in their respective divisions in 1997 and 1998 along with winning the RSL in 1998.

In the 2004–05 season, Kazan signed 11 National Hockey League players, including Russian superstars Alexei Kovalev and Ilya Kovalchuk and Canadians Vincent Lecavalier and Dany Heatley, in an attempt to celebrate Kazan's 10th anniversary with a championship. They did not succeed, however, as a lack of continuity and chemistry saw them finish in fourth place and were upset in the first round of the playoffs by Lokomotiv Yaroslavl. Since then, Ak Bars Kazan dominated the RSL, winning the league in 2006. In 2007, Kazan paced the league with 35 wins and 214 goals in 54 games before falling at the final hurdle to Metallurg Magnitogorsk.

Ak Bars has been led in recent years by the dominant "ZZM" line of Sergei Zinovjev, Danis Zaripov, and Aleksey Morozov, who have established themselves as one of the most dominant lines in recent history. Combined with veterans such as Vitaly Proshkin and Vladimir Vorobiev, and imports, such as Ray Giroux, Petr Čajánek, and Jukka Hentunen, Kazan has remained one of the top teams in the league. However, they have been at times criticized for lacking consistency and relying too heavily on star players such as Morozov.

Ak Bars Kazan are strong rivals with Lokomotiv Yaroslavl and the neighboring team of Salavat Yulaev Ufa. However, Ak Bars was the strongest rival with Dynamo Moscow in the 1990s.

== Honors ==
=== Champions ===
(gold) Russian Championship (5): 1997–98, 2005–06, 2008-09, 2009–10, 2017–18
(gold) Gagarin Cup (3): 2008-09, 2009–10, 2017–18
(gold) Opening Cup (3): 2009–10, 2020–21, 2023–24
(gold) Russian Superleague (2): 1997–98, 2005–06
(gold) IIHF European Champions Cup (1): 2007
(gold) IIHF Continental Cup (1): 2007–08
(gold) Soviet Class A2 (3): 1962, 1985, 1989 (West)
(gold) Soviet Class B (1): 1976

=== Runners-up ===
(silver) Russian Championship (5): 1999-00, 2001-02, 2006-07, 2014-15, 2019-20
(silver) Gagarin Cup (3): 2014-15, 2022-23, 2025-26
(silver) Russian Superleague (3): 1999-00, 2001-02, 2006-07
(bronze) Russian Championship (1): 2016-17
(bronze) Gagarin Cup (1): 2016-17
(bronze) Russian Superleague (1): 2003-04
(bronze) IIHF Continental Cup (1): 1999-00

== Season-by-season KHL record ==
Note: GP = Games played; W = Wins; L = Losses; OTL = Overtime/shootout losses; Pts = Points; GF = Goals for; GA = Goals against; P = Playoff

Season	GP	W	L	OTL	Pts	GF	GA	Finish	Top Scorer	Playoffs
2008–09	56	36	10	6	122	189	123	1st, Chernyshev	Alexei Morozov (71 points: 32 G, 39 A; 49 GP)	Gagarin Cup Champions, 4–3 (Lokomotiv Yaroslavl)
2009–10	56	25	18	5	96	159	128	2nd, Kharlamov	Alexei Morozov (49 points: 26 G, 23 A; 50 GP)	Gagarin Cup Champions, 4–3 (HC MVD)
2010–11	54	29	12	8	105	181	133	1st, Kharlamov	Alexei Morozov (56 points: 21 G, 35 A; 53 GP)	Lost in Conference Semifinals, 1–4 (Salavat Yulaev Ufa)
2011–12	54	27	19	5	92	167	136	3rd, Kharlamov	Alexei Morozov (50 points: 21 G, 29 A; 53 GP)	Lost in Conference Semifinals, 2–4 (Traktor Chelyabinsk)
2012–13	52	28	10	8	104	157	112	1st, Kharlamov	Alexei Morozov (38 points: 15 G, 26 A; 51 GP)	Lost in Conference Finals, 3–4 (Traktor Chelyabinsk)
2013–14	54	26	14	6	100	139	108	2nd, Kharlamov	Alexander Burmistrov (38 points: 10 G, 28 A; 54 GP)	Lost in Conference Quarterfinals, 2–4 (Sibir Novosibirsk)
2014–15	60	34	14	6	120	169	115	1st, Kharlamov	Justin Azevedo (50 points: 17 G, 33 A; 58 GP)	Lost in Gagarin Cup Finals, 1–4 (SKA Saint Petersburg)
2015–16	60	31	20	9	96	143	127	2nd, Kharlamov	Justin Azevedo (53 points: 17 G, 36 A; 59 GP)	Lost in Conference Quarterfinals, 3–4 (Salavat Yulaev Ufa)
2016–17	60	38	18	4	109	155	127	2nd, Kharlamov	Justin Azevedo (34 points: 13 G, 21 A; 54 GP)	Lost in Conference Finals, 0–4 (Metallurg Magnitogorsk)
2017–18	56	32	18	6	100	158	126	1st, Kharlamov	Jiri Sekac (42 points: 16 G, 26 A; 50 GP)	Gagarin Cup Champions, 4–1 (CSKA Moscow)
2018–19	62	38	18	6	82	165	139	3rd, Kharlamov	Jiri Sekac (47 points: 23 G, 24 A; 60 GP)	Lost in Conference Quarterfinals, 0–4 (Avangard Omsk)
2019–20	62	44	13	5	93	178	121	1st, Kharlamov	Justin Azevedo (37 points: 13 G, 24 A; 57 GP)	Won in Conference Quarterfinals, 4–0 (Neftekhimik Nizhnekamsk); Playoffs cancelled due to COVID-19 pandemic
2020–21	60	41	11	8	90	185	131	1st, Kharlamov	Stéphane Da Costa (57 points: 27 G, 30 A; 52 GP)	Lost in Conference Finals, 3–4 (Avangard Omsk)
2021–22	48	30	12	6	66	129	109	3rd, Kharlamov	Dmitri Kagarlitsky (34 points: 12 G, 22 A; 46 GP)	Lost in Conference Quarterfinals, 2–4 (Avangard Omsk)
2022–23	68	41	18	9	91	187	158	1st, Kharlamov	Alexander Radulov (57 points: 25 G, 32 A; 62 GP)	Lost in Gagarin Cup Finals, 3–4 (CSKA Moscow)
2023–24	68	41	25	2	84	175	140	2nd, Kharlamov	Vadim Shipachyov (44 points: 13 G, 31 A; 62 GP)	Lost in Conference Quarterfinals, 1–4 (Avtomobilist Yekaterinburg)
2024–25	68	42	23	3	87	211	162	4th, Kharlamov	Artyom Galimov (59 points: 35 G, 24 A; 68 GP)	Lost in Round 2, 2–4 (Dynamo Moscow)
2025–26	68	43	17	8	94	212	169	2nd, Kharlamov	Kirill Semyonov (56 points: 18 G, 38 A; 68 GP)	Lost in Gagarin Cup Finals, 2–4 (Lokomotiv Yaroslavl)

== Players ==
=== Current roster ===
Updated 11 September 2026.

No.	Nat	Player	Pos	S/G	Age	Acquired	Birthplace
20	(Russia)	Maxim Arefyev	G	L	23	2024	Orsk, Russia
32	(Russia)	Igor Bardin	D	L	20	2025	Chelyabinsk, Russia
82	(Russia)	Timur Bilyalov	G	L	31	2019	Kazan, Russia
37	(Russia)	Maxim Bykov	LW	R	24	2022	Naberezhnye Chelny, Russia
22	(Russia)	Alexei Byvaltsev	C	L	32	2026	Magnitogorsk, Russia
55	(United States)	Sasha Chmelevski	C	R	27	2025	Huntington Beach, California, United States
14	(Russia)	Grigori Denisenko	LW	R	26	2025	Novosibirsk, Russia
86	(Russia)	Nikita Dynyak	LW	R	29	2019	St. Petersburg, Russia
95	(Russia)	Artyom Galimov	F	L	27	2018	Samara, Russia
13	(United States)	Kevin Hayes	C	L	34	2026	Boston, Massachusetts, United States
75	(Russia)	Alexander Ivanov	D	L	18	2025	Moscow, Russia
92	(Russia)	Dmitri Katelevsky	F	L	23	2020	Orenburg, Russia
96	(Russia)	Nikita Lyamkin (A)	D	L	30	2017	Barnaul, Russia
53	(Russia)	Alexei Marchenko (C)	D	R	34	2023	Moscow, Russia
58	(United States)	Mitchell Miller	D	R	24	2023	Sylvania, Ohio, United States
71	(Russia)	Alexei Pustozyorov	LW	L	26	2024	Chebarkul, Russia
94	(Russia)	Kirill Semyonov (A)	C	L	31	2022	Omsk, Russia
26	(Russia)	Egor Sokolov	RW	R	26	2026	Yekaterinburg, Russia
23	(Belarus)	Andrei Stas	C	L	37	2026	Minsk, Byelorussian SSR, Soviet Union
59	(Russia)	Semyon Terekhov	F	L	24	2022	Chelyabinsk, Russia
28	(Russia)	Stepan Terekhov	D	L	21	2024	Chelyabinsk, Russia
29	(Russia)	Ravil Yakupov	RW	L	23	2026	Orenburg, Russia
33	(Russia)	Albert Yarullin	D	R	33	2024	Kazan, Russia
44	(Russia)	Nikita Yevseyev	D	L	22	2022	Almetievsk, Russia
8	(Russia)	Radel Zamaltdinov	RW	L	21	2024	Kazan, Russia

=== Franchise KHL scoring leaders ===
Ak Bars Kazan primary logo from 2008 to 2022

These are the top-ten point-scorers in franchise history. Figures are updated after each completed KHL regular season.

Note: Pos = Position; GP = Games played; G = Goals; A = Assists; Pts = Points; P/G = Points per game; = current Ak Bars player

Points
Player	Pos	GP	G	A	Pts	P/G
(Russia) Danis Zaripov	RW/LW	438	148	182	330	0.75
(Russia) Alexei Morozov	RW	256	112	152	264	1.03
(Canada) Justin Azevedo	C	351	93	169	262	0.75
(Russia) Ilya Nikulin	D	363	58	159	217	0.60
(Russia) Kirill Petrov	LW	468	102	103	205	0.44
(Russia) Kirill Semyonov	C	272	60	126	186	0.68
(Russia) Artyom Galimov	C	387	84	93	177	0.45
(Russia) Artyom Lukoyanov	LW	634	75	92	167	0.26
(Russia) Stanislav Galiev	RW	336	78	87	165	0.49
(Finland) Niko Kapanen	C	264	53	109	162	0.61

Goals
Player	Pos	G
(Russia) Danis Zaripov	RW/LW	148
(Russia) Alexei Morozov	RW	112
(Russia) Kirill Petrov	LW	102
(Canada) Justin Azevedo	C	93
(Russia) Artyom Galimov	C	84
(Russia) Stanislav Galiev	RW	78
(Russia) Artyom Lukoyanov	LW	75
(Russia) Vladimir Tkachyov	C	71
(Czech Republic) Dmitrij Jaškin	RW	71
(Finland) Janne Pesonen	LW	68

Assists
Player	Pos	A
(Russia) Danis Zaripov	RW/LW	182
(Canada) Justin Azevedo	C	169
(Russia) Ilya Nikulin	D	159
(Russia) Alexei Morozov	RW	152
(Russia) Kirill Semyonov	C	126
(Russia) Nikita Lyamkin	D	113
(Russia) Evgeny Medvedev	D	110
(Finland) Niko Kapanen	C	109
(Russia) Kirill Petrov	LW	103
(Russia) Artyom Galimov	C	93

=== NHL alumni ===
- (Russia) Denis Arkhipov (1995–2000)
- (Russia) Dmitri Bykov (1999–2002)
- (Russia) Pavel Datsyuk (2000–2001)
- (Russia) Fedor Tyutin (2003–2004)
- (Russia) Aleksey Morozov (2005–2013)
- (Russia) Alexander Burmistrov (2008–2009, 2013–2015, 2017–2018, 2020–2022)

=== Head coaches ===
- Anatoly Muravyov (1956–1965, 1966–1968)
- Ismail Milushev (1965–66, 1968–1971)
- Evgeny Yegorov (1971–1975)
- Vladimir Andreyev (1975–1978)
- Vladimir Vasiliev (1978–1982)
- Oleg Golyamin (1982–1984)
- Gennady Tsygurov (1984–1987)
- Vitaly Stain (1987–88)
- Vsevolod Yelfimov (1988–1991, 1994–95)
- Yuri Ochnev (1991–92)
- Vladimir Gusev (1992)
- Viktor Kuznetsov (1992–94)
- Yuri Moiseev (1995–1999, 2001–02)
- Vladimir Krikunov (1999–01)
- Vladimir Plyushev (2002–03)
- Vladimír Vůjtek (2003–04)
- Zinetula Bilyaletdinov (2004–2011)
- Vladimir Krikunov (2011–2012)
- Valery Belov (2012–2014)
- Zinetula Bilyaletdinov (2014–2019)
- Dmitri Kvartalnov (2019–2022)
- Oleg Znarok (2022)
- Yuri Babenko* (2022)
- Zinetula Bilyaletdinov (2022–2024)
- Anvar Gatiyatulin (2024–present)

== Notable alumni ==
- Vincent Lecavalier
- Dany Heatley
- Brad Richards
- Robert Esche
- Ilya Kovalchuk
- Alexei Kovalev
- Vyacheslav Kozlov
- Darius Kasparaitis
- Nikolai Khabibulin
- Aleksey Morozov
- Pavel Datsyuk
- Niko Kapanen
- Nik Antropov
- Ruslan Salei
- Michael Nylander
- Jiří Hudler
- Marcel Hossa
- Andrei Markov
