= 2007 Channel One Cup =

Tournament details
- Host countries: Russia; Czech Republic
- Cities: Moscow; Prague
- Venues: 2 (in 2 host cities)
- Dates: 13–17 December 2007
- Teams: 4

Final positions
- Champions: Russia (11th title)
- Runners-up: Finland
- Third place: Czech Republic
- Fourth place: Sweden

Tournament statistics
- Games played: 6
- Goals scored: 38 (6.33 per game)
- Attendance: 53,480 (8,913 per game)
- Scoring leader: (Russia) Fedor Fedorov (5 points)

The 2007 Channel One Cup was played between 13 and 16 December 2007. The Czech Republic, Finland, Sweden and Russia played a round-robin for a total of three games per team and six games in total. Five of the matches were played in the Khodynka Arena in Moscow, Russia, and one match in Sazka Arena in Prague, Czech Republic. Russia won the tournament. The tournament was a part of the 2007–08 Euro Hockey Tour.

== Standings ==
Pos	Team	Pld	W	OTW	OTL	L	GF	GA	GD	Pts
1	Russia	3	3	0	0	0	11	2	+9	9
2	Finland	3	1	1	0	1	10	11	−1	5
3	Czech Republic	3	1	0	1	1	11	15	−4	4
4	Sweden	3	0	0	0	3	6	10	−4	0

Source: eurohockey

== Games ==
All times are local. Moscow – (Moscow Time – UTC+3) Prague – (Central European Time – UTC+1)

13 December 2007; 17:30	Czech Republic	5-4 (1-1, 4-1, 0-2)	Sweden	Sazka Arena, Prague; Attendance: 5,730

Game reference

Johan Backlund
Goalies
Milan Hnilička
Referee:
(Finland) Jari Levonen
Linesmen:
(Czech Republic) Jaromir Bláha
(Czech Republic) Frantisek Kalivoda

Rolinek (Prusek, Červenka) – 01:00	1-0
	1-1	02:09 – Axelsson (Hedin)
Čermák (Melichar) – 23:08	2-1
Bulis (Marek) – 30:09	3-1
Hřebejk (Čermák, Skuhravý) – 38:23	4-1
Prusek (Rolinek, Kutlák) (PP) – 39:57	5-2	38:48 – Persson
	5-3	46:53 – Fabricius (Hedin)
	5-4	56:13 – Nordgren (Hedström, Harju)

16 min
Penalties
20 min
36
Shots
23

13 December 2007; 20:00	Finland	1-4 (0-0, 1-1, 0-3)	Russia	Khodynka Arena, Moscow; Attendance: 13,050

Game reference

Petri Vehanen
Goalies
Alexander Yeryomenko
Referee:
(Czech Republic) Radek Husicka
Linesmen:
(Russia) Alexei Medvedev
(Russia) Viktor Birin

Voutilainen (Laine, Hirschovits) – 20:51	1-0
	1-1	21:58 – Markov (Peretyagin, Fedorov) (PP)
	1-2	48:09 – Saprykin (Korneyev, Kurianov) (PP)
	1-3	51:48 – Nepryaev (Fedorov)
	1-4	58:57 – Fedorov] (Peretyagin, Nepryaev)

22 min
Penalties
18 min
24
Shots
33

15 December 2007; 14:00	Russia	2-0 (0-0, 1-0, 1-0)	Sweden	Khodynka Arena, Moscow; Attendance: 12,000

Game reference
Dmitri Yachanov	Goalies	Daniel Larsson	Referee: (Russia) Konstantin Olenin; Linesmen: (Russia) Sergei Shelyanin (Russia) Aleksandr Sadovnikov
Morozov (Proshkin, Zinovyev) (PP) – 24:54 / 1-0; Saprykin (Sushinsky, Kurianov) – 56:59 / 2-0			Referee: (Russia) Konstantin Olenin; Linesmen: (Russia) Sergei Shelyanin (Russia) Aleksandr Sadovnikov
16 min	Penalties	16 min	Referee: (Russia) Konstantin Olenin; Linesmen: (Russia) Sergei Shelyanin (Russia) Aleksandr Sadovnikov
23	Shots	41	Referee: (Russia) Konstantin Olenin; Linesmen: (Russia) Sergei Shelyanin (Russia) Aleksandr Sadovnikov

15 December 2007; 18:00	Czech Republic	5-6 GWS (1-3, 2-1, 2-1) (OT: 0–0) (SO: 0–1)	Finland	Khodynka Arena, Moscow; Attendance: 6,500

Game reference

Milan Hnilička
Goalies
Tuomas Tarkki
Referee:
(Czech Republic) Radek Husicka
Linesmen:
(Russia) Aleksei Medvedev
(Russia) Viktor Birin

	0-1	04:48 – Pikkarainen (Pihlman, Immonen) (PP)
	0-2	06:32 – Pirnes (Immonen) (SHG)
	0-3	07:06 – Pirnes (SHG)
Hřebejk (Kumstát) – 18:37	1-3
Kumstát (Hřebejk) – 26:37	2-3
	2-4	28:11 – Laine (Aalto)
Červenka (Prusek, Kutlák) (PP) – 31:14	3-4
	3-5	43:44 – Mäntylä (Saarinen)
Hřebejk (Kumstát) – 47:29	4-5
Skuhravý – 54:21	5-5

Krstev (miss)
Shootout
Hirschovits
16 min
Penalties
16 min
24
Shots
41

16 December 2007; 14:00	Russia	5-1 (2-1, 1-0, 2-0)	Czech Republic	Khodynka Arena, Moscow; Attendance: 8,200

Game reference

Alexander Yeryomenko
Goalies
Lukáš Mensator
Referee:
(Sweden) Sören Persson
Linesmen:
(Russia) Viktor Birin
(Russia) Aleksei Medvedev

Fedor Fedorov – 01:57	1-0
Morozov (Zaripov, Zinovyev) (PP) – 08:26	2-0
	2-1	18:25 – Skuhravý (PP)
Perezjogin (Mozyakin, Tereshchenko) – 23:14	3-1
Sushinsky (Saprykin) (PP) – 41:07	4-1
Fedor Fedorov (Afanasenkov, Nepryaev) – 51:33	5-1

8 min
Penalties
16 min
37
Shots
29

16 December 2007; 18:00	Sweden	2-3 (2-0, 0-2, 0-1)	Finland	Khodynka Arena, Moscow; Attendance: 8,000

Game reference

Daniel Larsson
Goalies
Petri Vehanen
Referee:
(Russia) Vyacheslav Bulanov
Linesmen:
(Russia) Aleksandr Sadovnikov
(Russia) Sergei Shelyanin

Skogs (Nordgren) – 07:05	1-0
Persson (Fransson, Jämtin) – 16:19	2-0
	2-1	26:05 – Haataja (Immonen, Pihlman)
	2-2	38:33 – Immonen (Pihlman, Aalto)
	2-3	58:11 – Saarinen (Hytönen, Pirnes)

14 min
Penalties
22 min
27
Shots
31

== Scoring leaders ==
Pos	Player	Country	GP7	G	A	Pts	+/−	PIM	POS
1	Fedor Fedorov	Russia	3	3	2	5	+4	2	CE
2	Štěpán Hřebejk	Czech Republic	3	3	1	4	+4	0	RW
3	Jarkko Immonen	Finland	3	1	3	4	+3	0	CE
4	Oleg Saprykin	Russia	3	2	1	3	0	0	CE
5	Esa Pirnes	Finland	3	2	1	3	+3	4	CE
5	Václav Skuhravý	Czech Republic	3	2	1	3	+3	4	CE

TOI = Time on ice (minutes:seconds); SA = Shots against; GA = Goals against; GAA = Goals Against Average; Sv% = Save percentage; SO = Shutouts
Source: swehockey

== Goaltending leaders ==
Pos	Player	Country	TOI	GA	GAA	Sv%	SO
1	Alexander Yeryomenko	Russia	178:18	2	0.67	97.30	0
2	Daniel Larsson	Sweden	118:34	5	2.53	90.38	0
3	Petri Vehanen	Finland	120:00	5	3.00	90.00	0
4	Lukáš Mensator	Czech Republic	117:55	8	4.07	88.89	0

TOI = Time on ice (minutes:seconds); SA = Shots against; GA = Goals against; GAA = Goals Against Average; Sv% = Save percentage; SO = Shutouts
Source: swehockey

== Tournament awards ==
Best players selected by the directorate:

- Best goalkeeper: (Russia) Alexander Yeryomenko
- Best defenceman: (Finland) Mikko Luoma
- Best forward: (Russia) Oleg Saprykin

Media All-Star Team:

- Goaltender: (Russia) Alexander Yeryomenko
- Defence: (Finland) Pasi Puistola, (Russia) Danny Markov
- Forwards: (Russia) Oleg Saprykin, (Finland) Esa Pirnes, (Russia) Fedor Fedorov
