= 2006 Česká pojišťovna Cup =

2006 Česká Pojišťovna Cup
Tournament details
- Host countries: Czech Republic; Sweden
- Cities: Liberec; Linköping
- Venues: 2 (in 2 host cities)
- Dates: 31 August – 3 September 2006
- Teams: 4

Final positions
- Champions: Russia (2nd title)
- Runners-up: Finland
- Third place: Sweden
- Fourth place: Czech Republic

Tournament statistics
- Games played: 6
- Goals scored: 35 (5.83 per game)
- Attendance: 17,945 (2,991 per game)
- Scoring leader: (Russia) Alexei Morozov (5 points)

The 2006 Česká Pojišťovna Cup was played between 31 August and 3 September 2006. The Czech Republic, Finland, Sweden and Russia played a round-robin for a total of three games per team and six games in total. Five of the matches were played in Tipsport Arena in Liberec, Czech Republic, and one match in Cloetta Center in Linköping, Sweden. The tournament was won by Russia. The tournament was part of 2006–07 Euro Hockey Tour.

== Standings ==
Pos	Team	Pld	W	OTW	OTL	L	GF	GA	GD	Pts
1	Russia	3	2	1	0	0	12	9	+3	8
2	Finland	3	1	0	1	1	7	8	−1	4
3	Sweden	3	1	0	1	1	9	9	0	4
4	Czech Republic	3	0	1	0	2	7	9	−2	2

Source: swehockey

== Games ==
All times are local. Liberec – (Central European Summer Time – UTC+1) Linköping – (Eastern European Summer Time – UTC+2)

31 August 2006; 18:00	Czech Republic	2-1 GWS (0-0, 0-0, 1-1) (OT: 0–0) (SO: 1–0)	Finland	Tipsport Arena, Liberec; Attendance: 3,296

Game reference
Milan Hnilička	Goalies	Sinuhe Wallinheimo
/ 0-1 / 50:42 – Teemu Aalto (Jussi Pesonen) (PP); 51:19 – Jan Marek / 1-1
Burger; Sýkora (miss); Hlinka (miss)	Shootout	(miss) Kontiola; (miss) Pesonen; (miss) Kivenmäki
12 min	Penalties	10 min
33	Shots	23

31 August 2006; 19:00	Sweden	3-4 GWS (2-2, 1-0, 0-1) (OT: 0–0) (SO: 0–1)	Russia	Cloetta Center, Linköping; Attendance: 4,328

Game reference

Daniel Henriksson
Goalies
Alexander Yeryomenko

02:33 – Johan Danielsson (Magnus Johansson, Mika Hannula)	1-0
	1-1	15:25 – Sergei Zinovyev (Alexei Morozov, Anton But)
17:33 – Anton Strålman (Kenny Jönsson) (PP)	2-1
	2-2	19:35 – Alexei Morozov (Anton But) (PP)
38:39 – Kenny Jönsson (Anton Strålman, Fredrik Emvall)	3-2
	3-3	41:15 – Alexei Morozov (Ilya Nikulin) (PP)

Pettersson
Bäckström (miss)
Davidsson
Pettersson (miss)
Bäckström (miss)
Johansson (miss)
Shootout
(miss) Morozov
Kulemin
Zinovyev
(miss) Morozov
(miss) Kulemin
Morozov
30 min
Penalties
30 min
39
Shots
28

2 September 2006; 14:00	Finland	3-4 (1-0, 2-2, 0-2)	Russia	Tipsport Arena, Liberec; Attendance: 784

Game reference

Ari Ahonen
Goalies
Konstantin Barulin

05:28 – Jussi Pesonen (Petri Kontiola)	1-0
	1-1	22:15 – Anton Kuryanov (Denis Tyurin)
26:37 – Tomek Valtonen (Kristian Kuusela, Sami Lepistö)	2-1
	2-2	34:07 – Dmitri Bykov (Anton Kuryanov)
39:12 – Jussi Pesonen (Petri Kontiola) (PP)	3-2
	3-3	54:50 – Denis Tyurin (Dmitri Bykov, Kirill Koltsov) (PP)
	3-4	55:20 – Anton But (Alexei Morozov, Ilya Nikulin)

24 min
Penalties
20 min
18
Shots
32

2 September 2006; 18:00	Czech Republic	2-4 (0-0, 1-2, 1-2)	Sweden	Tipsport Arena, Liberec; Attendance: 4,567

Game reference

Milan Hnilička
Goalies
Johan Backlund

	0-1	29:00 – Mathias Månsson (Kenneth Bergqvist) (PP)
	0-2	32:50 – Johan Davidsson (Hans Johansson, David Petrasek) (PP)
36:59 – Jan Marek (Václav Pletka, Václav Skuhravý)	1-2
44:18 – Jan Mare (Petr Sýkora)	2-2
	2-3	53:40 – Andreas Holmqvist (David Petrasek) (PP)
	2-4	59:40 – Tony Mårtensson (PP)

14 min
Penalties
10 min
32
Shots
26

3 September 2006; 14:00	Sweden	2-3 (1-2, 0-1, 1-0)	Finland	Tipsport Arena, Liberec; Attendance: 597

Game reference

Daniel Henriksson
Goalies
Sinuhe Wallinheimo

	0-1	03:01 – Kristian Kuusela (Teemu Aalto, Arto Laatikainen) (PP)
10:01 – Stefan Pettersson (Fredrik Emvall)	1-1
	1-2	15:45 – Jukka Laamanen (Ville Viitaluoma)
	1-3	27:24 – Teemu Nurmi (Teemu Aalto, Petri Kontiola)
49:20 – Nicklas Bäckström (Magnus Johansson) (PP)	2-3

20 min
Penalties
18 min
31
Shots
30

3 September 2006; 18:00	Czech Republic	3-4 (0-1, 1-2, 2-1)	Russia	Tipsport Arena, Liberec; Attendance: 4,373

Game reference

Roman Málek
Goalies
Alexander Yeryomenko

	0-1	16:21 – Aleksandr Popov (Anton Kuryanov) (PP)
	0-2	28:27 – Denis Tyurin (Kirill Koltsov)
	0-3	37:08 – Alexei Simakov (Ilya Nikulin) (SHG)
38:37 – Lukáš Zíb (Josef Marha) (PP)	1-3
45:03 – Jan Marek (Jaroslav Hlinka, Lukáš Zíb)	2-3
	2-4	52:25 – Vitali Proshkin (Anton But, Alexander Nikulin)
53:15 – Jiří Burger (Zdeněk Kutlák, Zbyněk Irgl)	3-4

12 min
Penalties
16 min
34
Shots
30

== Scoring leaders ==
Pos	Player	Country	GP	G	A	Pts	+/−	PIM	POS
1	Alexei Morozov	Russia	3	3	2	5	+2	0	FW
2	Anton But	Russia	3	1	3	4	+2	4	DF
3	Jan Marek	Czech Republic	3	3	0	3	+2	4	FW
4	Denis Tyurin	Russia	3	2	1	3	+2	0	FW
5	Jussi Pesonen	Finland	3	2	1	3	+3	4	FW

GP = Games played; G = Goals; A = Assists; Pts = Points; +/− = Plus/minus; PIM = Penalties in minutes; POS = Position
Source: swehockey

== Goaltending leaders ==
Pos	Player	Country	TOI	GA	GAA	Sv%	SO
1	Sinuhe Wallinheimo	Finland	125:01	4	1.92	93.75	0
2	Alexander Yeryomenko	Russia	125:00	6	2.88	91.78	0
3	Milan Hnilička	Czech Republic	133:48	5	2.40	'89.80	0
4	Daniel Henriksson	Sweden	124:46	7	3.38	87.93	0

TOI = Time on ice (minutes:seconds); SA = Shots against; GA = Goals against; GAA = Goals Against Average; Sv% = Save percentage; SO = Shutouts
Source: swehockey

== Tournament awards ==
The tournament directorate named the following players in the tournament 2006:

- Best goalkeeper: (Finland) Sinuhe Wallinheimo
- Best defenceman: (Czech Republic) Radek Hamr
- Best forward: (Russia) Anton Kuryanov
