= 2009 (September) Czech Hockey Games =

2009 Czech Hockey Games (September)
Tournament details
- Host countries: Czech Republic; Russia
- Cities: Karlovy Vary; Podolsk
- Venues: 2 (in 2 host cities)
- Dates: 3–6 September 2009
- Teams: 4

Final positions
- Champions: Czech Republic (6th title)
- Runners-up: Russia
- Third place: Finland
- Fourth place: Sweden

Tournament statistics
- Games played: 6
- Goals scored: 37 (6.17 per game)
- Attendance: 23,754 (3,959 per game)
- Scoring leader: (Czech Republic) Jiří Hudler (5 points)

Awards
- MVP: (Czech Republic) Jiří Hudler

The 2009 September Czech Hockey Games was played between 3 and 6 September 2009. The Czech Republic, Finland, Sweden and Russia played a round-robin for a total of three games per team and six games in total. Five of the matches were played in KV Arena in Karlovy Vary, Czech Republic, and one match in Podolsk Arena in Podolsk, Russia. The tournament was won by the Czech Republic. The tournament was part of 2009–10 Euro Hockey Tour.

== Standings ==
Pos	Team	Pld	W	OTW	OTL	L	GF	GA	GD	Pts
1	Czech Republic	3	2	1	0	0	10	4	+6	8
2	Russia	3	1	0	2	0	8	9	−1	5
3	Finland	3	1	0	0	2	10	8	+2	3
4	Sweden	3	0	1	0	2	9	16	−7	2

Source: swehockey

== Games ==
All times are local. Karlovy Vary – (Central European Time – UTC+1) Podolsk – (Eastern European Time – UTC+2)

3 September 2009; 18:00	Czech Republic	2-0 (0-0, 1-0, 1-0)	Finland	Podolsk Arena, Podolsk; Attendance: 4,533

Game reference
Lukáš Mensator	Goalies	Petri Vehanen
24:49 – Roman Červenka / 1-0; 59:46 – Jiří Hudler / 2-0
10 min	Penalties	8 min
29	Shots	29

3 September 2009; 20:00	Russia	3-4 GWS (1-2, 1-1, 1-0) (OT: 0–0) (SO: 0–1)	Sweden	KV Arena, Karlovy Vary; Attendance: 5,500

Game reference

Mikael Tellqvist
Goalies
Alexander Yeryomenko

	0-1	09:13 – Linus Omark (Johan Harju, Patrik Zackrisson)
	0-2	11:01 – Linus Omark (Patrik Zackrisson)
19:26 – Viktor Kozlov (Maxim Sushinsky, Vitali Proshkin)	1-2
42:00 – Oleg Saprykin (Dmitri Kalinin)	2-2
	2-3	44:52 – Johan Harju (Patrik Zackrisson)
48:33 – Alexander Perezhogin (Konstantin Korneyev, Petr Schastlivy)	3-3

Shootout
Weinhandl
12 min
Penalties
22 min
38
Shots
30

5 September 2009; 13:30	Russia	3-2 (1-1, 1-0, 1-1)	Finland	KV Arena, Karlovy Vary; Attendance: 1,393

Game reference

Vasily Koshechkin
Goalies
Pekka Tuokkola

02:03 – Sergei Mozyakin (Alexander Perezhogin)	1-0
	1-1	07:21 – Markus Seikola (Jari Viuhkola)
29:53 – Sergei Mozyakin (Alexander Perezhogin)	2-1
48:20 – Oleg Saprykin (Kirill Koltsov, Alexander Radulov)	3-1
	3-2	59:18 – Jan Latvala (Jari Viuhkola)

22 min
Penalties
22 min
47
Shots
34

5 September 2009; 17:00	Czech Republic	5-2 (1-1, 3-0, 1-1)	Sweden	KV Arena, Karlovy Vary; Attendance: 5,295

Game reference

Jakub Štěpánek
Goalies
Johan Holmqvist

05:11 – Josef Melichar (Petr Kumstát)	1-0
	1-1	17:52 – Johan Harju (Patrik Zackrisson, Lars Jonsson)
32:46 – Jaroslav Bednář (Tomáš Rolinek)	2-1
33:51 – Jiří Hudler (Karel Rachůnek)	3-1
39:16 – Josef Vašíček (Petr Hubáček)	4-1
	4-2	41:34 – Linus Omark (Daniel Tjärnqvist)
59:03 – Petr Kumstát	5-2

47 min
Penalties
34 min
22
Shots
22

6 September 2009; 14:00	Sweden	3-8 (1-4, 1-0, 1-4)	Finland	KV Arena, Karlovy Vary; Attendance: 1,351

Game reference

Mikael Tellqvist
Goalies
Petri Vehanen

	0-1	04:38 – Jari Viuhkola (Jan Latvala, Antti Erkinjuntti) (PP)
	0-2	07:56 – Antti Erkinjuntti (Jari Viuhkola) (PP)
	0-3	08:30 – Joonas Kemppainen (Juuso Puustinen)
	0-4	15:49 – Marko Anttila (Tuomas Kiiskinen, Markus Seikola)
16:26 – Per-Johan Axelsson	1-4
34:33 – Per-Johan Axelsson (Fredrik Pettersson, Dick Tärnström)	2-4
	2-5	44:15 – Harri Ilvonen (Joonas Kemppainen)
	2-6	45:00 – Marko Anttila
	2-7	46:53 – Markus Seikola
	2-8	51:24 – Ville Mäntymaa
52:58 – Mathias Tjärnqvist (PP)	3-8

12 min
Penalties
12 min
25
Shots
21

6 September 2009; 17:00	Czech Republic	3-2 GWS (1-1, 0-1, 1-0) (OT: 0–0) (SO: 1–0)	Russia	KV Arena, Karlovy Vary; Attendance: 5,682

Game reference

Lukáš Mensator
Goalies
Alexander Yeryomenko

	0-1	05:10 – Petr Schastlivy (Denis Kulyash, Konstantin Korneyev) (PP)
17:30 – Jiří Hudler (Petr Kumstát, Jakub Klepiš)	1-1
	1-2	26:02 – Denis Kulyash (Sergei Mozyakin, Konstantin Korneyev)
57:21 – Jiří Hudler (Petr Kumstát)	2-2

Hudler
Shootout

== Scoring leaders ==
Pos	Player	Country	GP	G	A	Pts	+/−	PIM	POS
1	Jiří Hudler	Czech Republic	3	5	0	5	+3	2	F
2	Jari Viuhkola	Finland	3	1	3	4	-3	2	F
3	Petr Kumstat	Czech Republic	3	1	3	4	+4	0	F
4	Patrik Zackrisson	Sweden	3	0	4	4	0	0	F
5	Linus Omark	Sweden	3	3	0	3	-1	6	F

GP = Games played; G = Goals; A = Assists; Pts = Points; +/− = Plus/minus; PIM = Penalties in minutes; POS = Position
Source: swehockey

== Goaltending leaders ==
Pos	Player	Country	TOI	GA	GAA	Sv%	SO
1	Lukáš Mensator	Czech Republic	125:00	2	0.96	96.55	0
2	Petri Vehanen	Finland	118:07	4	2.03	92.45	0
3	Alexander Yeryomenko	Russia	133:48	7	4.04	85.25	0
4	Johan Holmqvist	Sweden	128:05	9	4.22	83.64	0

TOI = Time on ice (minutes:seconds); SA = Shots against; GA = Goals against; GAA = Goals Against Average; Sv% = Save percentage; SO = Shutouts
Source: swehockey

== Tournament awards ==
The tournament directorate named the following players in the tournament 2009 (September):

- Best goalkeeper: (Finland) Petri Vehanen
- Best defenceman: (Czech Republic) Miroslav Blaťák
- Best forward: (Russia) Viktor Kozlov
- Most Valuable Player: (Czech Republic) Jiří Hudler
