= Štěpán =

Štěpán (Czech pronunciation: [ˈʃcɛpaːn]) is both a masculine Czech given name, equivalent of the English Stephen, and a Czech surname, which comes directly from the given name. Notable people with the name include:

== Given names ==
- Štěpán Hřebejk (b. 1982), Czech ice hockey player
- Štěpán Janáček (b. 1977), Czech pole vaulter
- Štěpán Kodeda (1988–2015), Czech orienteering competitor
- Štěpán Kolář (b. 1979), Czech footballer
- Štěpán Koreš (b. 1989), Czech footballer
- Štěpán Krtička (b. 1996), Czech child actor
- Štěpán Kučera (b. 1984), Czech footballer
- Štěpán Rak (b. 1945), Czech classical guitarist and composer
- Štěpán Slovák (b. 1998), Czech politician
- Štěpán Tesařík (b. 1978), Czech hurdler
- Štěpán Trochta (1905–1974), Czech cardinal
- Štěpán Vachoušek (b. 1979), Czech footballer

== Surname ==
- Joseph Anton Steffan or Josef Antonín Štěpán (1726–1797), Bohemian composer
- Miroslav Štěpán (1945–2014), Czechoslovak politician
- Pavel Štěpán (1925–1998), Czech pianist
- Vojtěch Štěpán (b. 1985) Czech footballer
