= Hřebejk =

Hřebejk (feminine: Hřebejková) is a Czech surname. Notable people with the surname include:

- Jan Hřebejk (born 1967), Czech film director
- Štěpán Hřebejk (born 1982), Czech hockey player
