= Zib =

Zib or variations may refer to:

== People ==
- Lukas Zib (born 1977), Czech ice hockey player
- Tomáš Zíb (born 1976), Czech tennis player

== Science and technology ==
- Zebibyte (ZiB), a large unit of digital information storage
- Zebibit (Zib), a unit of digital information storage
- Zinc-ion battery, rechargeable battery technology

== Other ==
- An alternate transliteration for al-Zeeb, a Palestinian village depopulated in the lead up to and during the 1948 Arab-Israeli War
- Soviet space dog, ZIB, a passenger on a sub-orbital flight in 1951
- Zeit im Bild, an Austrian news television broadcast
- Zimbabwean sign languages (ISO 639-3 code)
- Zuse Institute Berlin, a research institute for applied mathematics and computer science
- Dorian "Zib" Zibowski, a character from the American webcomic Lackadaisy
