= Trhový Štěpánov =

- Town
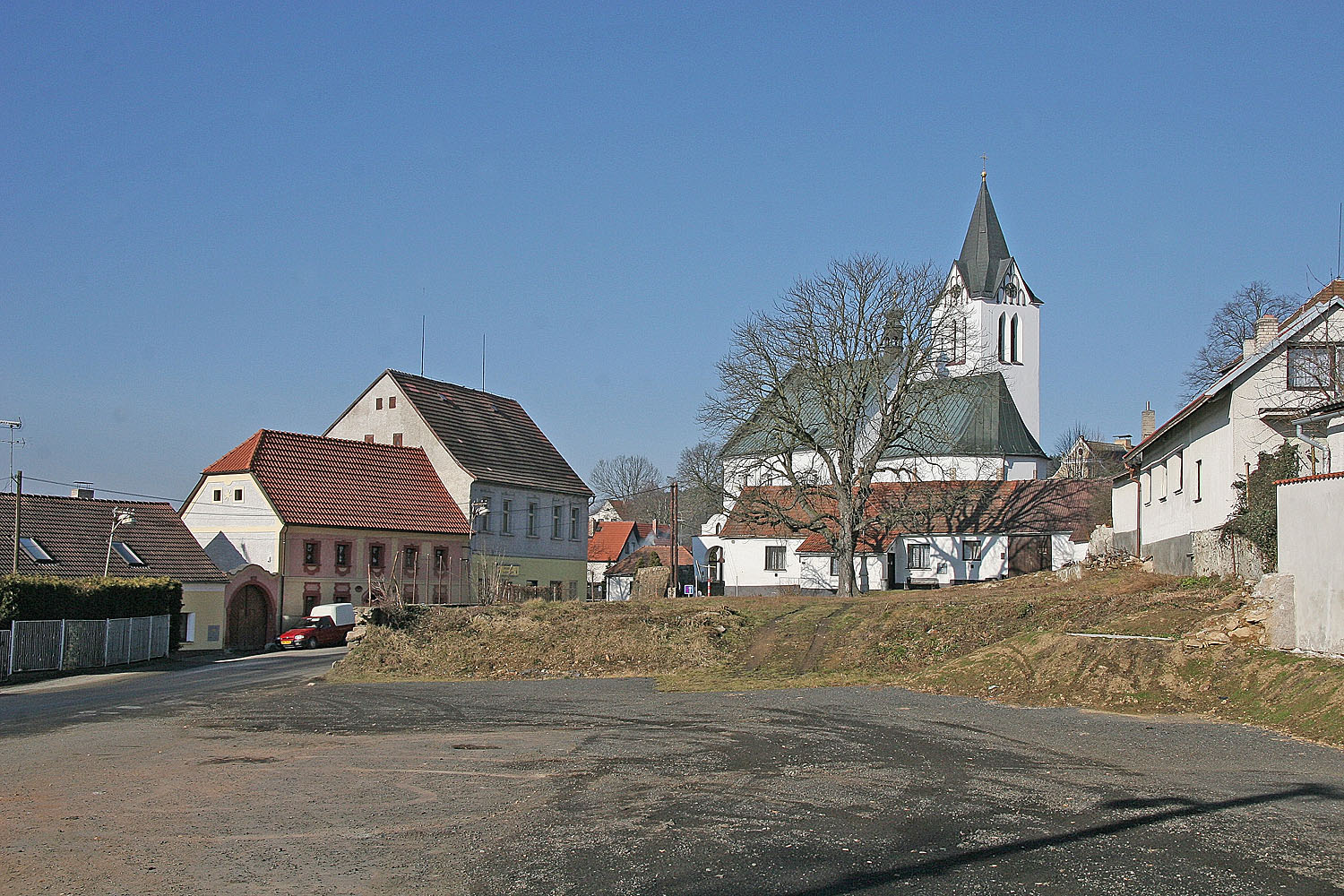
- Town square with the Church of Saint Bartholomew

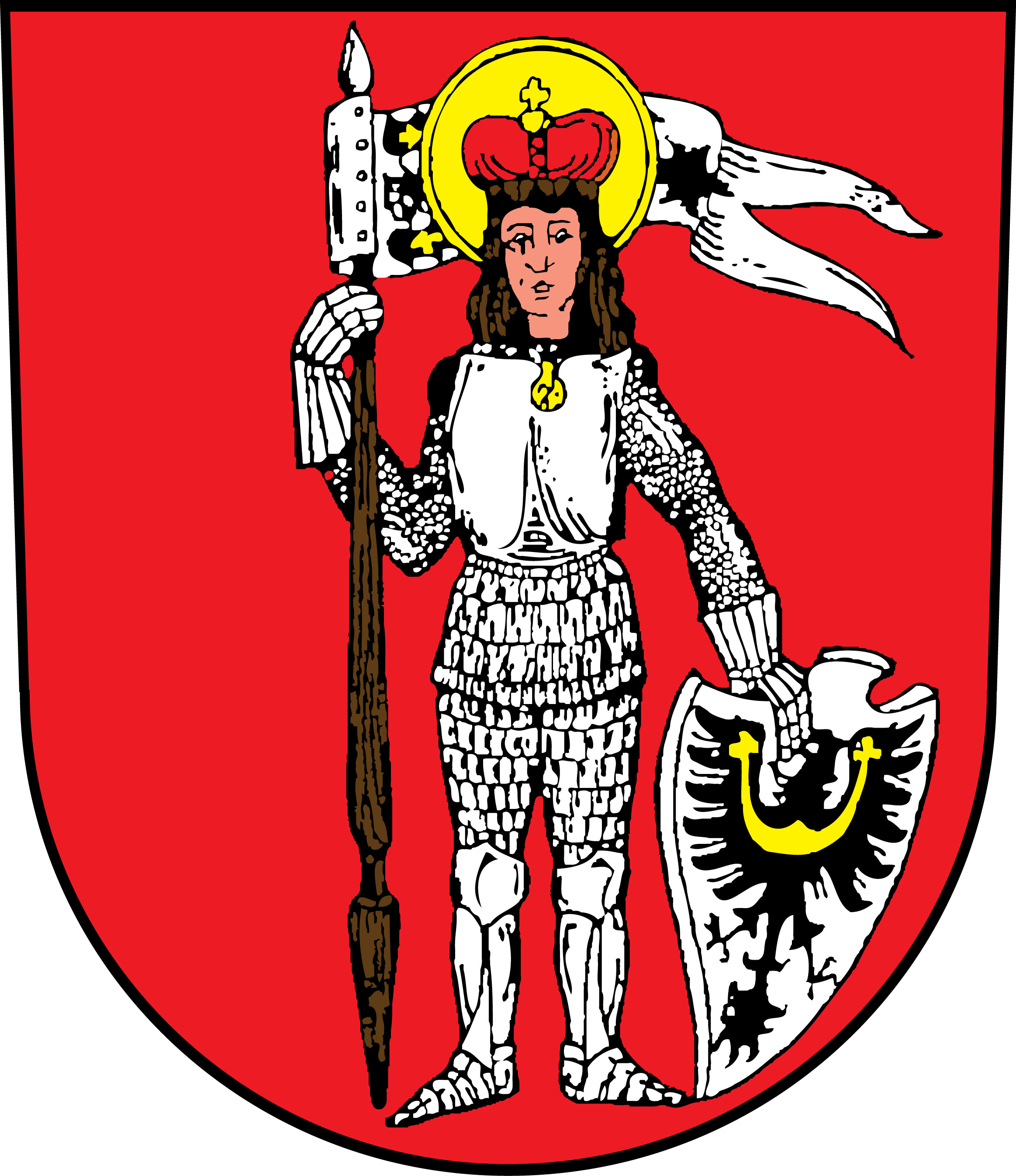
- Flag Coat of arms

- Location in the Czech Republic
- Coordinates: 49°42′42″N 15°0′49″E
- Country: Czech Republic
- Region: Central Bohemian
- District: Benešov
- First mentioned: 1108

Government
  - Mayor: Josef Korn

Area
  - Total: 28.91 km^{2} (11.16 sq mi)
- Elevation: 407 m (1,335 ft)

Population (2026-01-01)
  - Total: 1,489
  - Density: 51.50/km^{2} (133.4/sq mi)
- Time zone: UTC+1 (CET)
  - Summer (DST): UTC+2 (CEST)
- Postal code: 257 63
- Website: www.trhovystepanov.cz

Trhový Štěpánov (Czech pronunciation: [ˈtr̩ɦoviː ˈʃcɛpaːnof]; until 1912 Štěpánov; German: Markt Stiepanau) is a town in Benešov District in the Central Bohemian Region of the Czech Republic. It has about 1,500 inhabitants.

== Administrative division ==
Trhový Štěpánov consists of six municipal parts (in brackets population according to the 2021 census):

- Trhový Štěpánov (966)
- Dalkovice (74)
- Dubějovice (97)
- Sedmpány (84)
- Štěpánovská Lhota (15)
- Střechov nad Sázavou (108)

== Etymology ==
The name Štěpánov is derived from the personal name Štěpán, meaning "Štěpán's (court/castle)". Sometimes the adjective trhový (from trh, meaning 'market') was added to distinguish it from other places with the same name. Since 1912, the town has been officially named Trhový Štěpánov.

== Geography ==
Trhový Štěpánov is located about 24 kilometres (15 mi) east of Benešov and 51 km (32 mi) southeast of Prague. It lies in the Vlašim Uplands. The highest point is at 517 m (1,696 ft) above sea level. The stream Štěpánovský potok flows around the town.

== History ==
The first written mention of Štěpánov is from 1108. It was probably founded before 995. The settlement was promoted to a town in 1290.

== Demographics ==
Historical population

Year	Pop.	±%
1869	2,536	—
1880	2,597	+2.4%
1890	2,538	−2.3%
1900	2,399	−5.5%
1910	2,323	−3.2%

Year	Pop.	±%
1921	2,271	−2.2%
1930	2,103	−7.4%
1950	1,721	−18.2%
1961	1,681	−2.3%
1970	1,610	−4.2%

Year	Pop.	±%
1980	1,406	−12.7%
1991	1,260	−10.4%
2001	1,262	+0.2%
2011	1,347	+6.7%
2021	1,344	−0.2%

Source: Censuses

== Transport ==
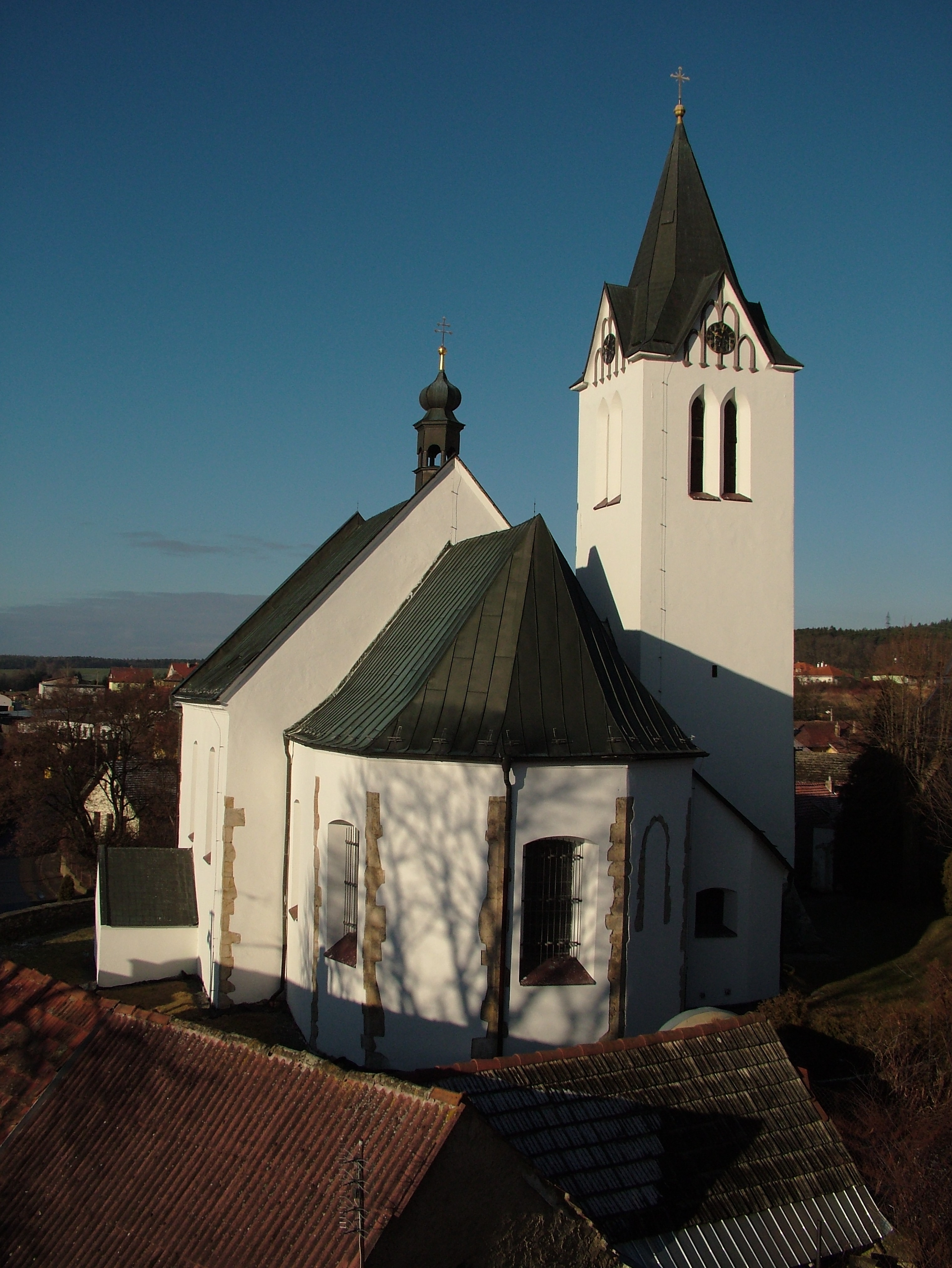
Church of Saint Bartholomew

The D1 motorway from Prague to Brno runs around the town.

== Sights ==
The main landmark of the town is the Church of Saint Bartholomew. It is a Gothic church from the 13th or 14th century, with Baroque modifications from around 1704. In 1856–1859, the wooden part of the tower was replaced with a brick one in the pseudo-Gothic style.
