= Stefan Pettersson =

Stefan Pettersson may refer to:

- Stefan Pettersson (footballer) (born 1963), Swedish football player
- Stefan Pettersson (ice hockey) (born 1977), Swedish ice hockey player
