= Jussi Jokinen =

Finnish ice hockey player (born 1983)

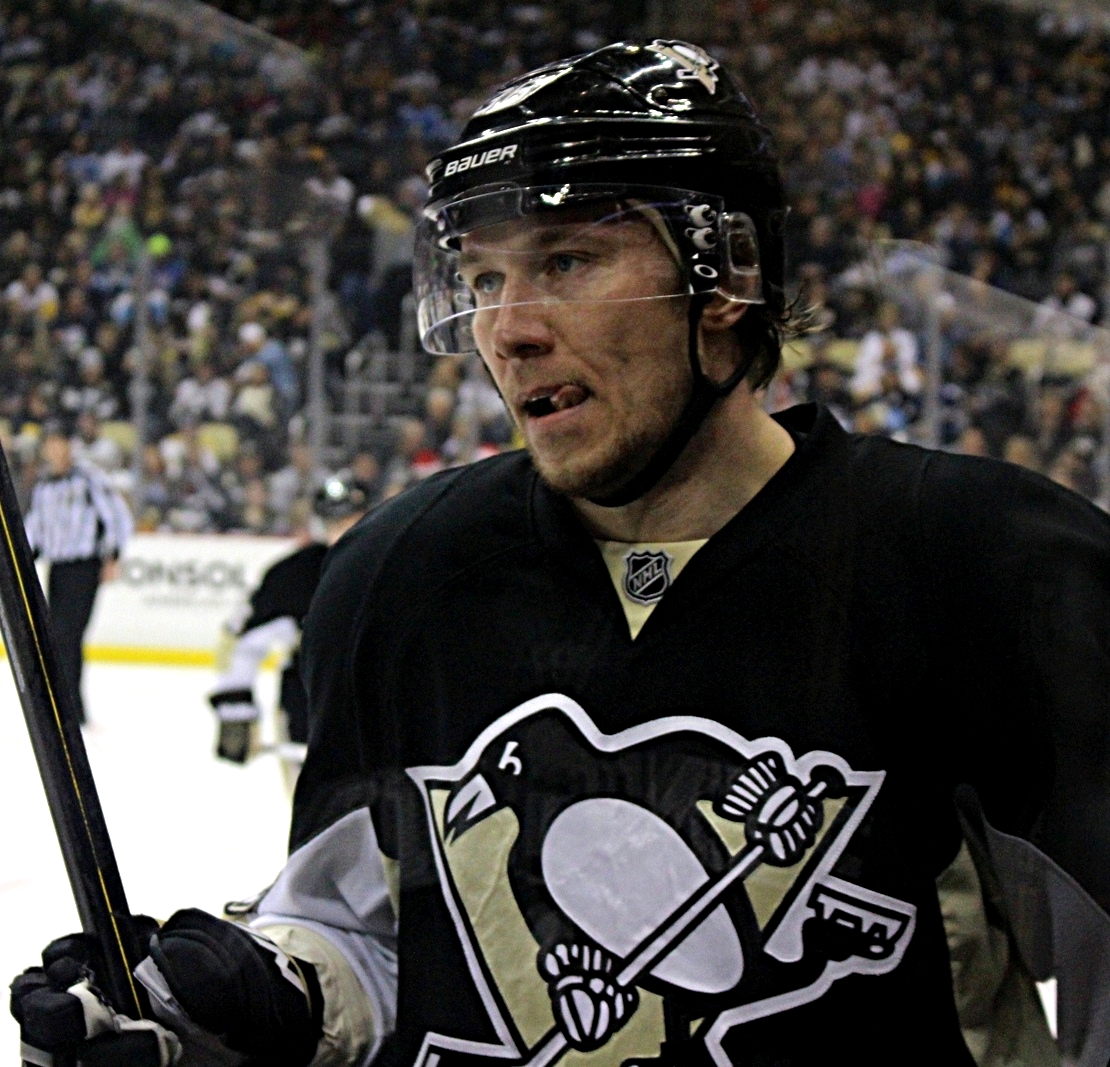
- Jokinen with the Pittsburgh Penguins in 2013
- Born: April 1, 1983 (age 43) Kalajoki, Finland
- Height: 6 ft 0 in (183 cm)
- Weight: 192 lb (87 kg; 13 st 10 lb)
- Position: Centre/Left wing
- Shot: Left
- Played for: Oulun Kärpät; Dallas Stars; Tampa Bay Lightning; Carolina Hurricanes; Pittsburgh Penguins; Florida Panthers; Edmonton Oilers; Los Angeles Kings; Columbus Blue Jackets; Vancouver Canucks; EHC Kloten
- National team: Finland
- NHL draft: 192nd overall, 2001; Dallas Stars
- Playing career: 2001–2021

Jussi Petteri Jokinen (born April 1, 1983) is a Finnish former professional ice hockey forward. After playing in his native Finland with Oulun Kärpät of the Liiga he was drafted by the National Hockey League (NHL)'s Dallas Stars in 2001 in the sixth round, 192nd overall, and spent his first three NHL seasons with the team. Jokinen has also played in the NHL for the Tampa Bay Lightning, Carolina Hurricanes, Pittsburgh Penguins, Florida Panthers, Edmonton Oilers, Los Angeles Kings, Columbus Blue Jackets and Vancouver Canucks.

Jokinen is of no relation to former NHL player Olli Jokinen, but has a younger brother, Juho, who also plays hockey. During his NHL career, Jokinen was widely considered a shootout and faceoff specialist.

== Playing career ==
=== Dallas Stars ===
Jokinen was drafted by the Dallas Stars in the sixth round, 192nd overall, at the 2001 NHL entry draft. He spent four seasons before his NHL debut playing for Oulun Kärpät of the SM-liiga, the top Finnish league.

In his rookie year in 2005–06, Jokinen gained a great reputation as a top shootout specialist in the NHL. Until being stopped by Vesa Toskala, he was a remarkable nine-for-nine in shootouts before his first unsuccessful attempt.

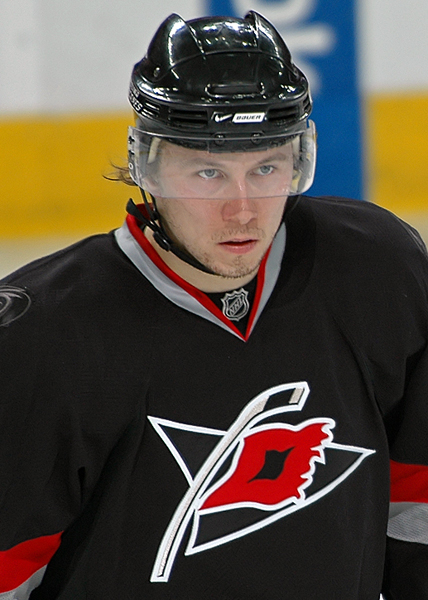
Jokinen with the Hurricanes in 2009

On November 16, 2007, Jokinen scored four goals against the Colorado Avalanche in a 6–1 win.

=== Tampa Bay Lightning and Carolina Hurricanes ===
At the NHL trade deadline, on February 26, 2008, Jokinen was traded to the Tampa Bay Lightning (along with Mike Smith, Jeff Halpern and a 2009 fourth-round draft pick) in exchange for Brad Richards and Johan Holmqvist. Jokinen finished with 16 goals and 42 points.

On February 4, 2009, Jokinen was placed on waivers by the Lightning and later, on February 7, 2009, was traded to the Carolina Hurricanes in exchange for Wade Brookbank, Josef Melichar and a 2009 fourth-round draft pick. During the 2009 Stanley Cup playoffs, on April 21, he scored the latest regulation game-winning goal in NHL playoff history, with 0.2 seconds remaining in the third period, as the Hurricanes defeated the New Jersey Devils 4–3 in Game 4 of the Eastern Conference Quarter-finals.

On June 29, 2009, the Hurricanes signed Jokinen to a two-year, $3.4 million contract ($1.5 million in 2009–10 and $1.9 million in 2010–11). As of November 19, 2009, Jokinen had scored a total of 25 goals in 46 shootout attempts, with an impressive 54.3% success rate. Eight of those shootout goals were game-winners.

Jokinen re-signed with his former Finnish club Kärpät during the 2012–13 NHL lockout and committed himself to remain with the club until the resumption of the NHL season in January 2013.

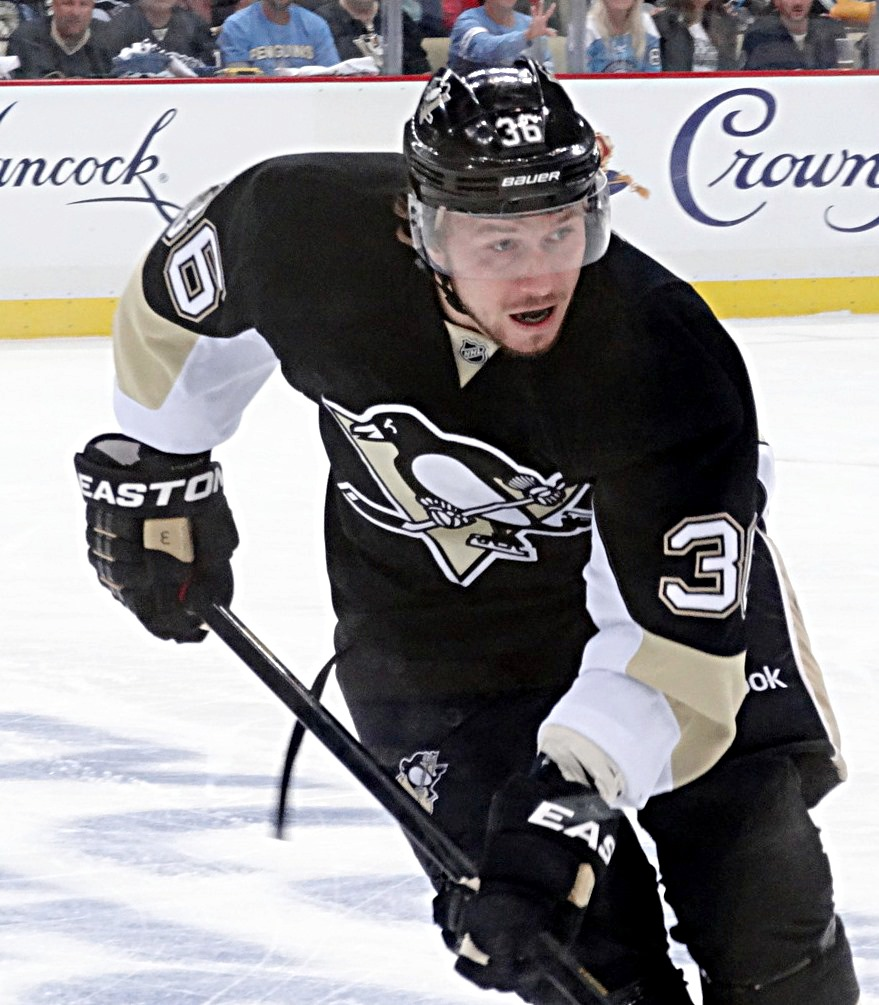
During the 2013 Stanley Cup playoffs

=== Pittsburgh Penguins ===
On March 26, 2013, Jokinen was placed on waivers by Hurricanes. On April 3, 2013, Jokinen was traded to the Pittsburgh Penguins in exchange for a conditional sixth- or seventh-round pick in 2013. In his first game with the Penguins, Jokinen scored Pittsburgh's lone goal in regulation and tallied the only shootout goal for the team in a 2–1 victory over the New York Rangers. During the 2013–14 season, on October 8, 2013, Jokinen scored his first hat-trick with the Penguins in a 5–2 win over his former team, the Carolina Hurricanes. Jokinen enjoyed his most productive season since 2010, totaling 21 goals and 57 points in 81 games with the Penguins, playing alongside Evgeni Malkin for most of the season.

=== Florida Panthers ===
On July 1, 2014, as an unrestricted free agent, Jokinen signed a four-year, $16 million contract with the Florida Panthers. During his second season with the club, Jokinen scored 18 goals and 60 points, the second-best offensive output of his career. During six playoff games, Jokinen contributed one goal and three assists.

=== Final NHL season ===
On June 30, 2017, following the 2016–17 season and with one-year remaining on his contract, Jokinen was bought-out by the Panthers. On July 7, 2017, as a free agent, Jokinen signed a one-year, $1.1 million contract with the Edmonton Oilers. In the 2017–18 season, he struggled to find his role with Edmonton, adding just 1 assist in 14 games. On November 14, 2017, he was traded to the Los Angeles Kings in exchange for Mike Cammalleri. Jokinen recorded 1 goal and 4 assists in 18 games for the club.

On January 16, 2018, Jokinen was placed on waivers by the Kings, and was then claimed off waivers by the Columbus Blue Jackets on January 17. On February 26, 2018, Jokinen and Tyler Motte were traded to the Vancouver Canucks in exchange for Thomas Vanek. As a result of this trade, Jokinen became the fourth player in NHL history, behind Dennis O'Brien, Dave McLlwain and Mark Arcobello, to play for four different NHL teams in a single season. He also joins the exclusive club of scoring at least a point in each of the four different hockey clubs he played for in one NHL season, along with O'Brien and Arcobello.

=== Return to Europe ===
Having completed his NHL career, Jokinen returned to Europe in signing with EHC Kloten of the Swiss League. He registered 12 points through just 7 games before returning to his original Finnish club, Oulun Kärpät.

After three further seasons in the Liiga, Jokinen announced his retirement on May 18, 2021, ending a career spanning 20 seasons.

== International play ==
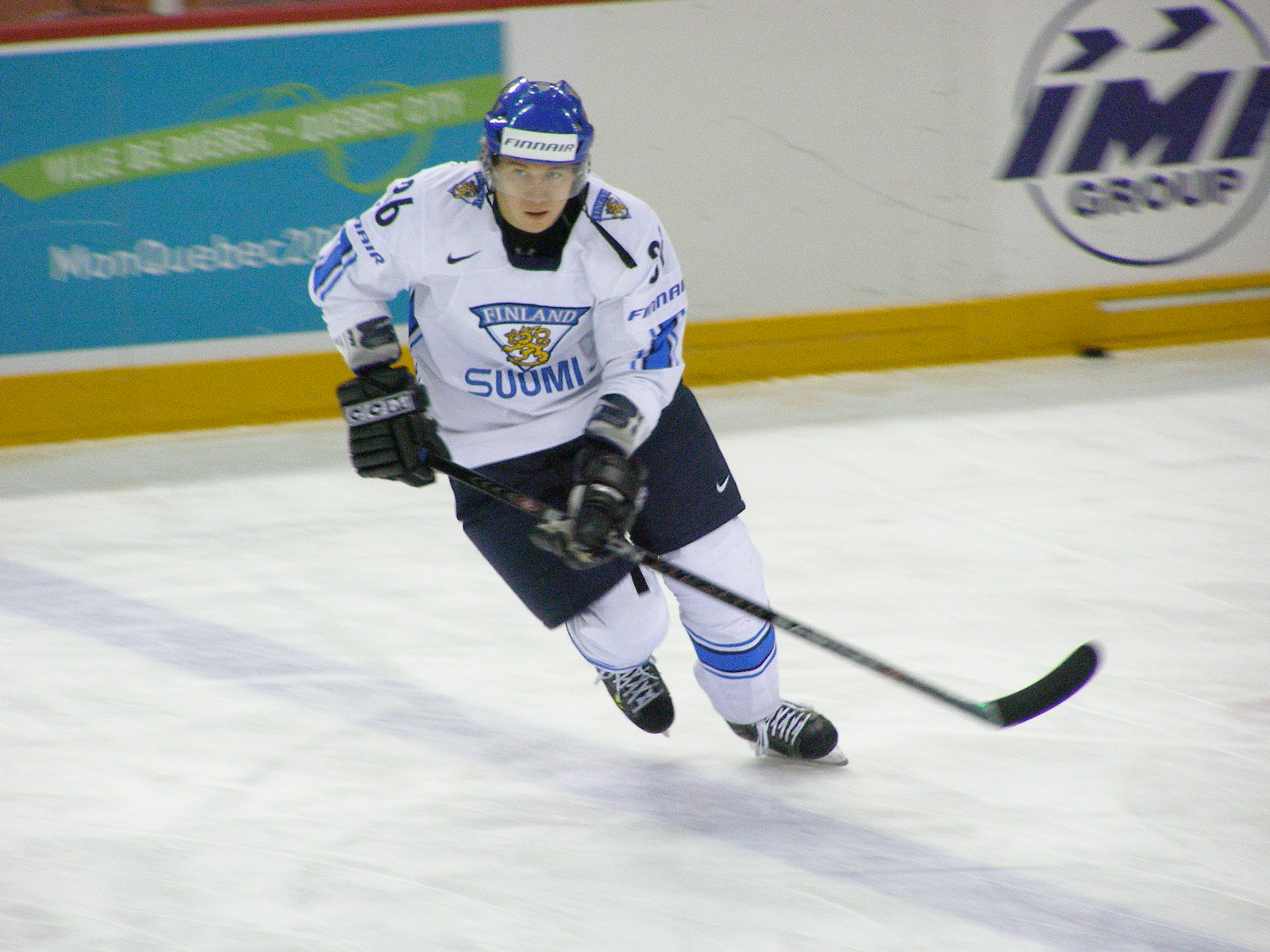
- Jokinen in 2008

Medal record

Representing Finland

Ice hockey

Olympic Games
Silver medal – second place	2006 Turin	
Bronze medal – third place	2014 Sochi	

World Championships
Silver medal – second place	2016 Russia	
Bronze medal – third place	2006 Latvia	
Bronze medal – third place	2008 Canada	

World Junior Championships
Bronze medal – third place	2002 Czech Republic	
Bronze medal – third place	2003 Canada	

World U18 Championships
Bronze medal – third place	2001 Finland	

Jokinen has played for the Finnish national team in multiple tournaments, including the 2006 and 2014 Winter Olympics, winning a silver and bronze medal.

In 2016, Jokinen and teammate Aleksander Barkov Jr. were selected to represent Team Finland at the 2016 IIHF World Championship. They won silver after a 2–0 loss to Team Canada.

== Career statistics ==
=== Regular season and playoffs ===
			Regular season					Playoffs
Season	Team	League	GP	G	A	Pts	PIM	GP	G	A	Pts	PIM
1999–2000	Kärpät	FIN U18	15	6	25	31	14	6	2	3	5	0
1999–2000	Kärpät	Jr. A	28	4	7	11	14	—	—	—	—	—
2000–01	Kärpät	FIN U18	1	2	1	3	0	—	—	—	—	—
2000–01	Kärpät	Jr. A	48	18	31	49	69	6	2	1	3	0
2001–02	Kärpät	Jr. A	2	4	1	5	0	1	1	1	2	0
2001–02	Kärpät	SM-l	54	10	6	16	38	4	1	0	1	0
2002–03	Kärpät	SM-l	51	14	23	37	10	15	2	1	3	33
2003–04	Kärpät	SM-l	55	15	23	38	20	15	3	4	7	6
2004–05	Kärpät	SM-l	56	23	24	47	24	12	3	4	7	2
2005–06	Dallas Stars	NHL	81	17	38	55	30	5	2	1	3	0
2006–07	Dallas Stars	NHL	82	14	34	48	18	4	0	1	1	0
2007–08	Dallas Stars	NHL	52	14	14	28	14	—	—	—	—	—
2007–08	Tampa Bay Lightning	NHL	20	2	12	14	4	—	—	—	—	—
2008–09	Tampa Bay Lightning	NHL	46	6	10	16	16	—	—	—	—	—
2008–09	Carolina Hurricanes	NHL	25	1	10	11	12	18	7	4	11	2
2009–10	Carolina Hurricanes	NHL	81	30	35	65	36	—	—	—	—	—
2010–11	Carolina Hurricanes	NHL	70	19	33	52	24	—	—	—	—	—
2011–12	Carolina Hurricanes	NHL	79	12	34	46	54	—	—	—	—	—
2012–13	Kärpät	SM-l	21	7	14	21	10	—	—	—	—	—
2012–13	Carolina Hurricanes	NHL	33	6	5	11	18	—	—	—	—	—
2012–13	Pittsburgh Penguins	NHL	10	7	4	11	6	8	0	3	3	4
2013–14	Pittsburgh Penguins	NHL	81	21	36	57	18	13	7	3	10	10
2014–15	Florida Panthers	NHL	81	8	36	44	34	—	—	—	—	—
2015–16	Florida Panthers	NHL	81	18	42	60	42	6	1	3	4	4
2016–17	Florida Panthers	NHL	69	11	17	28	39	—	—	—	—	—
2017–18	Edmonton Oilers	NHL	14	0	1	1	2	—	—	—	—	—
2017–18	Los Angeles Kings	NHL	18	1	4	5	4	—	—	—	—	—
2017–18	Columbus Blue Jackets	NHL	14	0	1	1	4	—	—	—	—	—
2017–18	Vancouver Canucks	NHL	14	4	6	10	2	—	—	—	—	—
2018–19	EHC Kloten	SL	7	2	10	12	8	—	—	—	—	—
2018–19	Kärpät	Liiga	14	6	14	20	4	16	2	7	9	20
2019–20	Kärpät	Liiga	47	9	25	34	43	—	—	—	—	—
2020–21	Kärpät	Liiga	51	9	17	26	14	5	2	1	3	2
Liiga totals			349	93	146	239	163	67	13	17	30	63
NHL totals			951	191	372	563	377	54	17	15	32	20

=== International ===
Year	Team	Event	Result	GP	G	A	Pts	PIM
2000	Finland	WHC17	9th	3	1	3	4	4
2001	Finland	WJC18	3rd place, bronze medalist(s)	6	2	0	2	2
2002	Finland	WJC	3rd place, bronze medalist(s)	7	2	6	8	2
2003	Finland	WJC	3rd place, bronze medalist(s)	7	6	2	8	2
2005	Finland	WC	7th	7	0	1	1	2
2006	Finland	OG	2nd place, silver medalist(s)	8	1	3	4	2
2006	Finland	WC	3rd place, bronze medalist(s)	9	2	6	8	2
2008	Finland	WC	3rd place, bronze medalist(s)	9	1	3	4	4
2010	Finland	WC	6th	7	2	1	3	20
2012	Finland	WC	4th	10	5	4	9	8
2014	Finland	OG	3rd place, bronze medalist(s)	6	2	3	5	0
2016	Finland	WC	2nd place, silver medalist(s)	10	3	7	10	2
2016	Finland	WCH	8th	3	0	1	1	2
Junior totals				23	11	11	22	10
Senior totals				77	19	37	56	42
