= Wade Brookbank =

Canadian ice hockey player (born 1977)

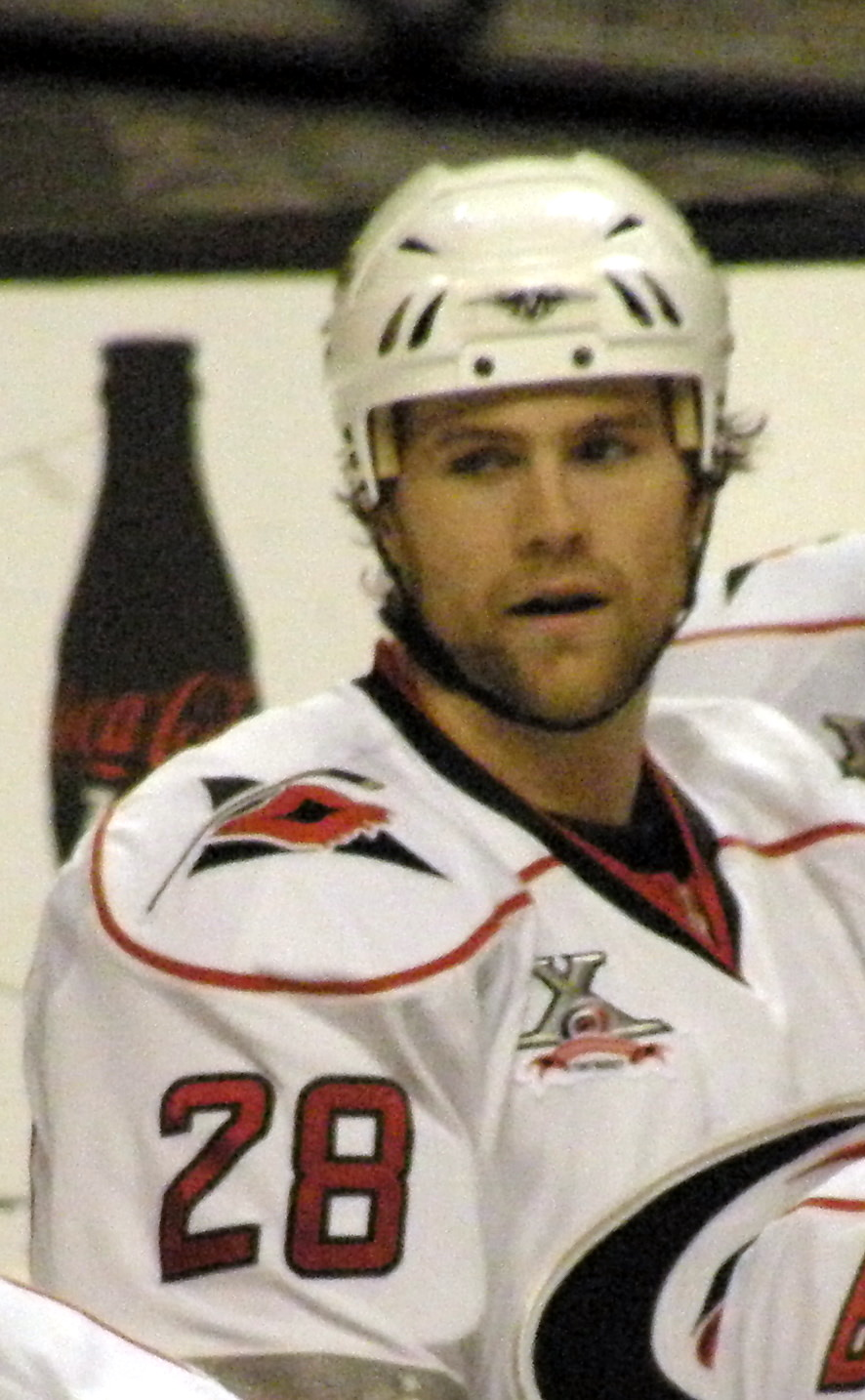
- Born: September 29, 1977 (age 48) Lanigan, Saskatchewan, Canada
- Height: 6 ft 4 in (193 cm)
- Weight: 225 lb (102 kg; 16 st 1 lb)
- Position: Defence
- Shot: Left
- Played for: Nashville Predators; Vancouver Canucks; Boston Bruins; Carolina Hurricanes
- NHL draft: Undrafted
- Playing career: 1998–2014

Wade Brookbank (born September 29, 1977) is a Canadian former professional ice hockey player. He played 127 games in the National Hockey League with the Nashville Predators, Vancouver Canucks, Boston Bruins, and Carolina Hurricanes between 2003 and 2009. He is currently a pro scout for the Chicago Blackhawks.

== Playing career ==
Undrafted, Brookbank previously played for the Anchorage Aces of the West Coast Hockey League (WCHL), the Oklahoma City Blazers of the Central Hockey League (CHL), the Orlando Solar Bears of the International Hockey League (IHL), the Grand Rapids Griffins, Providence Bruins, Wilkes-Barre/Scranton Penguins, Binghamton Senators, Milwaukee Admirals, Norfolk Admirals and Manitoba Moose of the American Hockey League (AHL), and the Nashville Predators, Vancouver Canucks, Boston Bruins and Carolina Hurricanes of the NHL.

The 2000–01 season saw him win two professional hockey championships. He played the first half of the season with the CHL's Oklahoma City Blazers before being called up by the IHL's Orlando Solar Bears where he won the last Turner Cup before the IHL amalgamated with the American Hockey League. He then went back to the Blazers where he helped them capture the CHL championship. His unofficial role is that of an enforcer, evident from his 43 career NHL fights, including 17 in his rookie season. Brookbank scored his first career NHL goal with the Canucks against Olaf Kolzig of the Washington Capitals on January 31, 2004 in a 6-1 victory. As an NHL player, he played primarily on wing.

He was traded by the Hurricanes, along with Josef Melichar and a fourth-round draft pick in the 2009 NHL entry draft, to the Tampa Bay Lightning for Jussi Jokinen on February 7, 2009. He was then assigned to their AHL affiliate, the Norfolk Admirals to finish the 2008–09 season. A free agent in the following off-season, he signed a one-year deal with the Pittsburgh Penguins on July 31, 2009.

On July 21, 2010, Brookbank signed as a free agent to a one-year deal with the Rockford IceHogs of the AHL.

Following the 2013-14 season, Brookbank retired from professional hockey. He is currently a pro scout for the Chicago Blackhawks.

== Personal life ==
Brookbank's younger brother Sheldon was also a professional ice hockey player who last played for the Cleveland Monsters of the AHL. He also has an older brother, Leigh. Leigh (Yorkton Terriers), Wade (Melville Millionaires), and Sheldon (Humboldt Broncos) are all Junior "A" alumni of the SJHL. Their father Murray was an assistant coach from 2004/05 to 2011/12 with the Humboldt Broncos. Brookbank is the cousin of Geoff Sanderson, a former NHL player.

In 2007, Brookbank was named as one of the Oklahoma City Blazers' 15 greatest players.

== Career statistics ==
=== Regular season and playoffs ===
			Regular season					Playoffs
Season	Team	League	GP	G	A	Pts	PIM	GP	G	A	Pts	PIM
1996–97	Melville Millionaires	SJHL	60	1	10	11	412	—	—	—	—	—
1997–98	Melville Millionaires	SJHL	58	8	21	29	330	—	—	—	—	—
1997–98	Anchorage Aces	WCHL	7	0	0	0	46	4	0	0	0	20
1998–99	Anchorage Aces	WCHL	56	0	4	4	337	5	0	0	0	7
1999–00	Oklahoma City Blazers	CHL	68	3	9	12	354	7	1	1	2	29
2000–01	Oklahoma City Blazers	CHL	46	1	13	14	267	5	0	0	0	24
2000–01	Orlando Solar Bears	IHL	29	0	1	1	122	4	0	0	0	6
2001–02	Grand Rapids Griffins	AHL	73	1	6	7	337	3	0	1	1	14
2002–03	Binghamton Senators	AHL	8	0	0	0	28	—	—	—	—	—
2003–04	Nashville Predators	NHL	9	0	0	0	38	—	—	—	—	—
2003–04	Milwaukee Admirals	AHL	6	0	0	0	6	—	—	—	—	—
2003–04	Vancouver Canucks	NHL	20	2	0	2	95	—	—	—	—	—
2003–04	Binghamton Senators	AHL	4	0	0	0	31	—	—	—	—	—
2003–04	Manitoba Moose	AHL	4	0	0	0	12	—	—	—	—	—
2004–05	Manitoba Moose	AHL	68	0	10	10	285	9	0	0	0	10
2005–06	Vancouver Canucks	NHL	32	1	2	3	81	—	—	—	—	—
2006–07	Boston Bruins	NHL	7	1	0	1	15	—	—	—	—	—
2006–07	Providence Bruins	AHL	4	0	0	0	15	—	—	—	—	—
2006–07	Wilkes-Barre/Scranton Penguins	AHL	39	1	0	1	116	5	0	0	0	6
2007–08	Albany River Rats	AHL	25	0	2	2	28	—	—	—	—	—
2007–08	Carolina Hurricanes	NHL	32	1	1	2	76	—	—	—	—	—
2008–09	Carolina Hurricanes	NHL	27	1	0	1	40	—	—	—	—	—
2008–09	Norfolk Admirals	AHL	24	0	1	1	46	—	—	—	—	—
2009–10	Wilkes-Barre/Scranton Penguins	AHL	68	3	4	7	168	4	0	0	0	6
2010–11	Rockford IceHogs	AHL	56	2	0	2	143	—	—	—	—	—
2011–12	Rockford IceHogs	AHL	17	1	4	5	44	—	—	—	—	—
2012–13	Rockford IceHogs	AHL	28	0	1	1	100	—	—	—	—	—
2013–14	Rockford IceHogs	AHL	27	0	1	1	30	—	—	—	—	—
AHL totals			451	8	29	37	1389	21	0	1	1	36
NHL totals			127	6	3	9	345	—	—	—	—	—

== Transactions ==
- Sep 1, 2000 - Signed as a free agent by Orlando Solar Bears.
- Jul 27, 2001 - Signed as a free agent by the Ottawa Senators.
- Oct 3, 2003 - Claimed by the Nashville Predators from the Ottawa Senators in the NHL Waiver Draft.
- Dec 17, 2003 - Traded to the Vancouver Canucks for future considerations.
- Dec 19, 2003 - Claimed by the Ottawa Senators off waivers from the Vancouver Canucks.
- Dec 29, 2003 - Traded to the Florida Panthers for future considerations.
- Jan 3, 2004 - Claimed by the Vancouver Canucks off waivers from the Florida Panthers.
- Jul 21, 2006 - Signed as an unrestricted free agent by the Boston Bruins.
- Dec 19, 2006 - Traded to the Pittsburgh Penguins for future considerations.
- Jul 3, 2007 - Signed as an unrestricted free agent by the Carolina Hurricanes.
- Feb 7, 2009 - Traded, along with Josef Melichar and a fourth round draft pick in the 2009 draft, to the Tampa Bay Lightning for Jussi Jokinen.
- Jul 31, 2009 - Signed as an unrestricted free agent by the Pittsburgh Penguins.
- Jul 21, 2010 - Signed as an unrestricted free agent by the Rockford IceHogs.
