= Jesse Saarinen =

Finnish ice hockey player (born 1985)

- Born: 29 July 1985 (age 40) Lahti, Finland
- Height: 5 ft 9 in (175 cm)
- Weight: 183 lb (83 kg; 13 st 1 lb)
- Position: Forward
- Shoots: Left
- Liiga team Former teams: HIFK; Lahti Pelicans; HC Karlovy Vary; SaiPa; HPK; Medveščak Zagreb
- Playing career: 2004–present

Jesse Saarinen (born 29 July 1985) is a Finnish professional ice hockey forward who currently plays for HIFK in the Liiga. Saarinen has previously played in over 500 games in his native Finland's top league, Liiga.

== Career statistics ==
=== Regular season and playoffs ===
			Regular season					Playoffs
Season	Team	League	GP	G	A	Pts	PIM	GP	G	A	Pts	PIM
2003–04	Pelicans	SM-l	2	0	0	0	0	—	—	—	—	—
2004–05	Pelicans	SM-l	34	0	4	4	18	—	—	—	—	—
2005–06	Pelicans	SM-l	54	14	16	30	50	—	—	—	—	—
2006–07	Pelicans	SM-l	51	10	18	28	46	6	0	1	1	12
2007–08	Pelicans	SM-l	54	20	12	32	53	—	—	—	—	—
2008–09	Pelicans	SM-l	57	9	21	30	41	10	1	2	3	8
2009–10	Pelicans	SM-l	51	7	10	17	16	—	—	—	—	—
2010–11	HC Karlovy Vary	Czech	6	1	0	1	4	—	—	—	—	—
2010–11	SaiPa	SM-l	36	9	5	14	24	—	—	—	—	—
2011–12	SaiPa	SM-l	59	12	31	43	12	—	—	—	—	—
2012–13	HPK	SM-l	38	7	8	15	18	5	0	1	1	0
2013–14	HPK	Liiga	44	8	15	23	14	6	0	1	1	12
2014–15	HPK	Liiga	59	17	26	43	8	—	—	—	—	—
2015–16	KHL Medveščak Zagreb	KHL	57	7	19	26	59	—	—	—	—	—
Liiga totals			539	113	166	279	302	33	2	8	10	34

=== International ===
Year	Team	Event	Result	GP	G	A	Pts	PIM
2003	Finland	WJC18	7th	6	3	2	5	4
Junior totals				6	3	2	5	4
