= Tuomas Pihlman =

Finnish ice hockey player

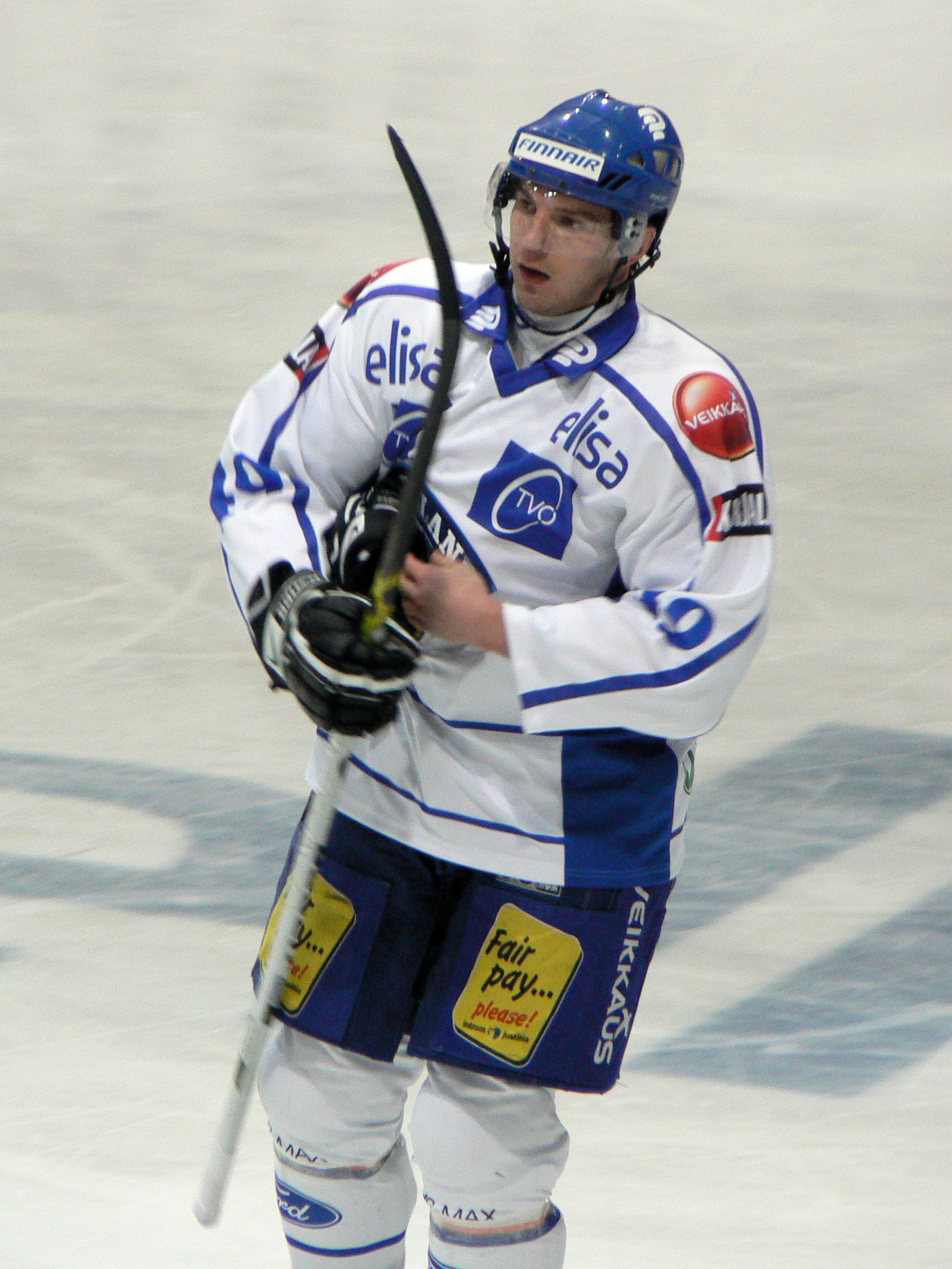
- Born: 13 November 1982 (age 43) Espoo, Finland
- Height: 6 ft 3 in (191 cm)
- Weight: 210 lb (95 kg; 15 st 0 lb)
- Position: Left wing
- Shot: Left
- Played for: JYP Jyväskylä; New Jersey Devils; Jokerit; Ässät
- National team: Finland
- NHL draft: 48th overall, 2001; New Jersey Devils
- Playing career: 1999–2017

Tuomas Pihlman (born 13 November 1982) is a Finnish former professional ice hockey Left wing who played in the Finnish Liiga with JYP Jyväskylä. He also played in 15 games for the New Jersey Devils in the National Hockey League (NHL).

== Playing career ==
Pihlman was drafted by the New Jersey Devils in the 2nd round, 48th overall, in the 2001 NHL entry draft. He played a total of 15 NHL games over three seasons, 2003–04, 2005–06 and 2006–07.

He was not offered a new contract after the 2016–17 season and officially announced his retirement in October 2017.

== Career statistics ==
=== Regular season and playoffs ===
			Regular season					Playoffs
Season	Team	League	GP	G	A	Pts	PIM	GP	G	A	Pts	PIM
1997–98	JYP	FIN U18	30	2	5	7	18	4	1	3	4	6
1998–99	JYP	FIN U18	35	21	20	41	64	6	1	1	2	12
1999–2000	JYP	FIN U20	20	4	4	8	54	4	0	0	0	8
1999–2000	JYP	SM-l	17	0	0	0	18	—	—	—	—	—
2000–01	JYP	FIN U20	1	1	0	1	2	6	2	4	6	4
2000–01	JYP	SM-l	47	3	6	9	59	—	—	—	—	—
2001–02	JYP	FIN U20	3	1	1	2	4	—	—	—	—	—
2001–02	JYP	SM-l	44	9	2	11	93	—	—	—	—	—
2002–03	JYP	SM-l	53	19	15	34	58	1	0	0	0	0
2003–04	Albany River Rats	AHL	73	10	19	29	59	—	—	—	—	—
2003–04	New Jersey Devils	NHL	2	0	0	0	2	—	—	—	—	—
2004–05	Albany River Rats	AHL	68	9	13	22	48	—	—	—	—	—
2005–06	Albany River Rats	AHL	63	12	15	27	64	—	—	—	—	—
2005–06	New Jersey Devils	NHL	11	1	1	2	10	—	—	—	—	—
2006–07	Lowell Devils	AHL	67	8	18	26	34	—	—	—	—	—
2006–07	New Jersey Devils	NHL	2	0	0	0	0	—	—	—	—	—
2007–08	JYP	SM-l	56	20	29	49	58	6	4	0	4	10
2008–09	JYP	SM-l	58	24	32	56	54	15	6	5	11	16
2009–10	JYP	SM-l	36	17	24	41	30	2	0	0	0	2
2010–11	Jokerit	SM-l	41	7	10	17	32	7	0	0	0	0
2011–12	JYP	SM-l	44	6	8	14	22	14	2	4	6	10
2011–12	JYP–Akatemia	Mestis	3	2	2	4	2	—	—	—	—	—
2012–13	Ässät	SM-l	53	3	7	10	43	16	2	1	3	10
2013–14	Ässät	Liiga	35	6	4	10	24	—	—	—	—	—
2013–14	JYP	Liiga	22	1	3	4	20	7	1	2	3	4
2014–15	JYP	Liiga	58	21	12	33	32	12	6	2	8	8
2015–16	JYP	Liiga	25	5	4	9	14	13	3	2	5	8
2016–17	JYP	Liiga	44	7	5	12	35	11	1	2	3	8
Liiga totals			633	148	161	309	592	104	24	19	43	76
AHL totals			271	39	65	104	205	—	—	—	—	—
NHL totals			15	1	1	2	12	—	—	—	—	—

=== International ===
Year	Team	Event	Result	GP	G	A	Pts	PIM
2000	Finland	WJC18	1st place, gold medalist(s)	7	3	2	5	8
2001	Finland	WJC	2nd place, silver medalist(s)	7	0	0	0	6
2002	Finland	WJC	3rd place, bronze medalist(s)	7	2	2	4	2
2009	Finland	WC	5th	6	2	1	3	4
Junior totals				21	5	4	9	16
Senior totals				6	2	1	3	4
