= Sergei Peretyagin =

Russian ice hockey player

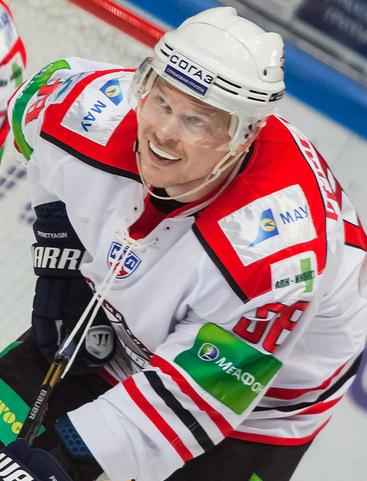
- Born: 19 April 1984 (age 42) Kirovo-Chepetsk, USSR
- Height: 6 ft 0 in (183 cm)
- Weight: 212 lb (96 kg; 15 st 2 lb)
- Position: Defence
- Shoots: Left
- KHL team Former teams: Kunlun Red Star; Torpedo Nizhny Novgorod; Neftekhimik Nizhnekamsk; Molot-Prikamye Perm; Krylya Sovetov Moscow; SKA Saint Petersburg; Amur Khabarovsk; HC Donbass; Lokomotiv Yaroslavl; HC Vityaz; Piráti Chomutov; HC Ugra
- Playing career: 2001–present

Sergei Peretyagin (born 19 April 1984) is a Russian professional ice hockey defenceman who has played for Kunlun Red Star of the Kontinental Hockey League (KHL). He has had two stints with the Red Star, having played in their inaugural season in the KHL in 2016–17 before briefly joining HC Ugra.
