= Štěpán Kolář =

Czech football coach

Personal information
- Date of birth: 19 June 1979 (age 47)
- Place of birth: Czechoslovakia
- Height: 1.89 m (6 ft 2 1/2 in)
- Position: Goalkeeper

Team information
- Current team: Viktoria Žižkov
- Number: 23

Senior career*
Years	Team	Apps	(Gls)
2003–2006	Bohemians 1905		
2006–2007	Loko Vltavín		
2007–?	Viktoria Žižkov		
2009	→ Příbram (loan)	0	(0)

Managerial career
- ≥: Liberec (goalkeeping coach)
- 2017–: Slavia Prague (goalkeeping coach)
- * Club domestic league appearances and goals as of 20 July 2011

Štěpán Kolář (born 19 June 1979) is a Czech football goalkeeping coach a former goalkeeper, who last played for Viktoria Žižkov. He made his Gambrinus liga début on 30 May 2009 for Viktoria Žižkov against Plzeň. He is currently employed at Slavia Prague in the Czech First League.
