= Jari Viuhkola =

Finnish ice hockey player

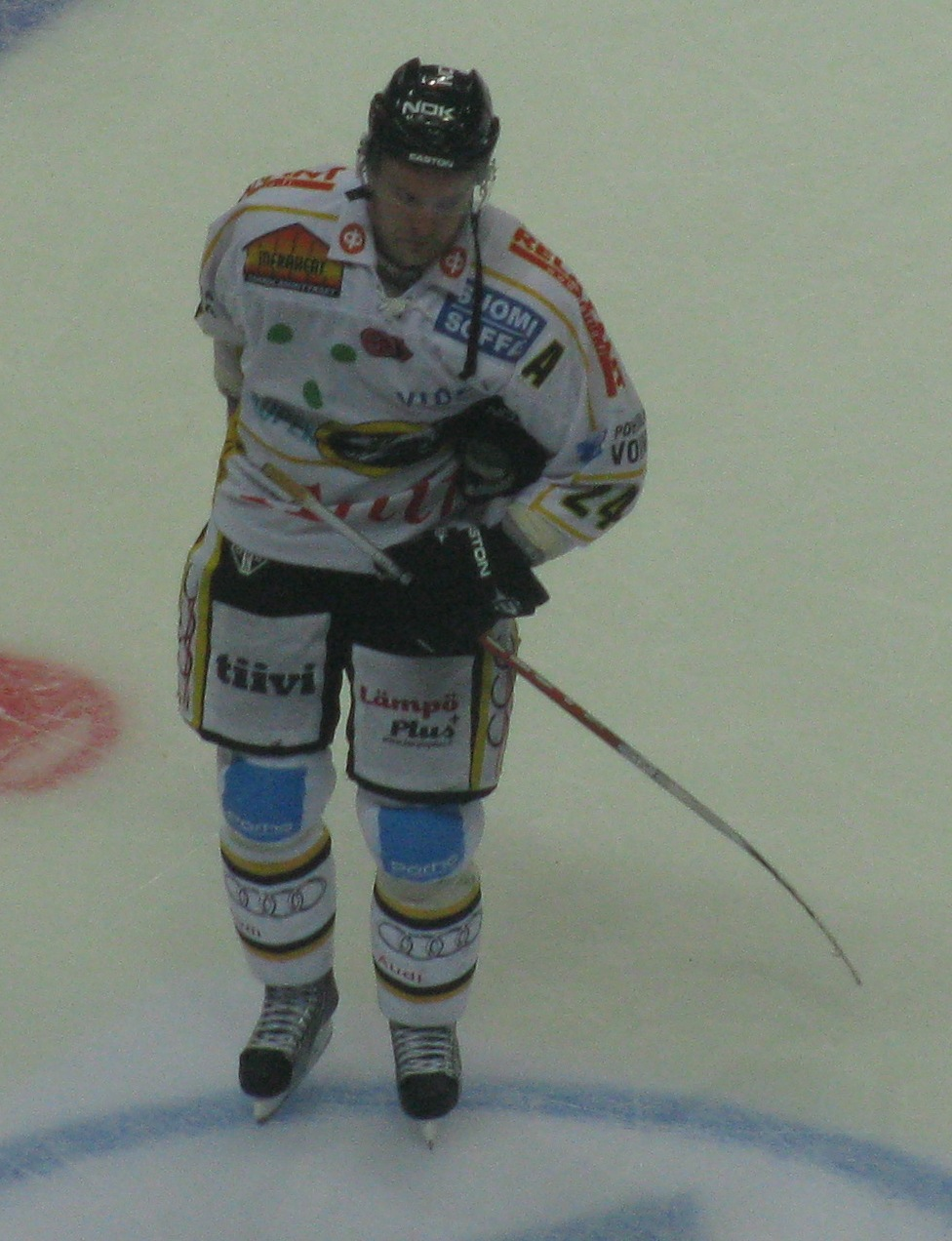
- Born: 27 February 1980 (age 45); Oulu, Finland
- Height: 6 ft 0 in (183 cm)
- Weight: 196 lb (89 kg; 14 st 0 lb)
- Position: Centre
- Shot: Left
- SM-liiga team: Kärpät
- NHL draft: 158th overall, 1998; Chicago Blackhawks
- Playing career: 1998–2015

Jari Viuhkola (born 27 February 1980) is a Finnish former professional ice hockey centre. He represented Kärpät in the Finnish SM-liiga. Viuhkola's career ended with season 2014–2015, after suffering from knee injuries. His last playing sessions he met with Mestis-team Kajaanin Hokki.

== Playing career ==
After playing for Kärpät for his entire professional career to that date, Viuhkola signed a two-way contract with the New Jersey Devils in the 2007 offseason. After playing just one pre-season NHL game, Viuhkola was assigned to the Lowell Devils, New Jersey's AHL affiliate. After suffering a back injury and playing only ten games for Lowell, Viuhkola returned to Finland and signed a new contract with Kärpät. He was winning the Finnish Championship on Liiga, in Finnish Kanada-malja in hockey season 2013–2014.Jari Viuhkola will have his playing number, #24 lifted up to Raksilas Oulu Energia-Areena roof.

=== Career statistics ===
			Regular season					Playoffs
Season	Team	League	GP	G	A	Pts	PIM	GP	G	A	Pts	PIM
1998–99	Kärpät	Fin 1st div	14	5	5	10	6	4	0	1	1	0
1999–00	Kärpät	1st div	31	6	15	21	59	7	1	0	1	2
2000–01	Kärpät	SM-liiga	54	5	8	13	32	9	0	1	1	6
2001–02	Kärpät	SM-liiga	46	8	14	22	24	4	1	0	1	6
2002–03	Kärpät	SM-liiga	49	15	17	32	56	15	4	8	12	10
2003–04	Kärpät	SM-liiga	53	25	31	56	34	14	3	5	8	4
2004–05	Kärpät	SM-liiga	44	15	16	31	30	12	5	10	15	6
2005–06	Kärpät	SM-liiga	46	12	27	39	40	11	2	8	10	4
2006–07	Kärpät	SM-liiga	37	7	38	45	40	10	4	6	10	6
2007–08	Lowell Devils	AHL	10	0	3	3	4
2007–08	Kärpät	SM-liiga	9	1	9	10	8	15	5	7	12	8
2008–09	Kärpät	SM-liiga	49	10	36	46	18	15	0	11	11	4
SM-liiga totals			418	104	211	315	341	112	25	56	81	56

== International play ==
Viuhkola played for Team Finland in the 2007 IIHF World Championship. Viuhkola spent most of the tournament centering Team Finland's top line with Ville Peltonen and Jere Lehtinen, but played poorly and did not manage a single assist in the tournament.

=== International statistics ===
Year	Team	Comp	GP	G	A	Pts	PIM
2005	Finland	WC	3	0	0	0	0
2006	Finland	WC	7	1	1	2	2
2007	Finland	WC	8	3	0	3	0
