= Dmitri Yachanov =

Russian ice hockey player

- Born: April 17, 1972 (age 53) Kazan, Russian SFSR, Soviet Union
- Height: 6 ft 0 in (183 cm)
- Weight: 190 lb (86 kg; 13 st 8 lb)
- Position: goaltender
- Shot: Left
- Played for: Sokol Novocheboksarsk; Itil Kazan; Toros Neftekamsk; TAN Kazan; Ak Bars Kazan; Torpedo Nizhny Novgorod; Neftyanik Almetyevsk; Krylya Sovetov Moscow; SKA Saint Petersburg
- National team: Russia
- Playing career: 1989–2010

Dmitri Nikolayevich Yachanov (Russian: Дмитрий Николаевич Ячанов; born 17 April 1972) is a Russian former professional ice hockey goaltender, who played for the Russia (2007 Channel One Cup and 2007 Karjala Tournament). After completing his career as a player, he became a coach.

== Awards and honors ==
Award	Year
Russian Superleague
Winner (Ak Bars Kazan)	1998
