= Denis Tyurin =

Russian ice hockey player

- Born: 3 June 1980 (age 45)
- Position: Left wing
- KHL team: HC Sibir Novosibirsk
- Playing career: 1997–present

Denis Alekseyevich Tyurin (Russian: Денис Алексеевич Тюрин; born 3 June 1980) is a Russian professional ice hockey winger who currently plays for HC Sibir Novosibirsk of the Kontinental Hockey League (KHL).
