= Vojtěch Štěpán =

Czech footballer

Personal information
- Date of birth: 8 June 1985 (age 41)
- Place of birth: Czechoslovakia
- Height: 1.78 m (5 ft 10 in)
- Position: Midfielder

Team information
- Current team: FK Kratonohy

Youth career
- 1992–1995: Sokol Morašice
- 1995–2001: Jiskra Litomyšl
- 2001–2004: SK Sigma Olomouc

Senior career*
Years	Team	Apps	(Gls)
2004–2005	→ OEZ Letohrad (loan)		
2005–2006	→ Hradec Králové (loan)	22	(0)
2006–2011	Sigma Olomouc	55	(3)
2007	→ Jablonec (loan)	3	(0)
2010–2011	→ Hradec Králové (loan)	11	(0)
2011–2014	Hradec Králové	56	(7)
2013	→ Slavia Praha (loan)	10	(0)
2014–2015	Baník Ostrava	40	(2)
2015–2017	Sigma Olomouc	11	(0)
2017	Olympia Prague		
2017–	FK Kratonohy		
- * Club domestic league appearances and goals as of 6 November 2017

Vojtěch Štěpán (born 8 June 1985) is a Czech football player who plays for FK Kratonohy.
