= Anton But =

Ukrainian-Russian ice hockey player

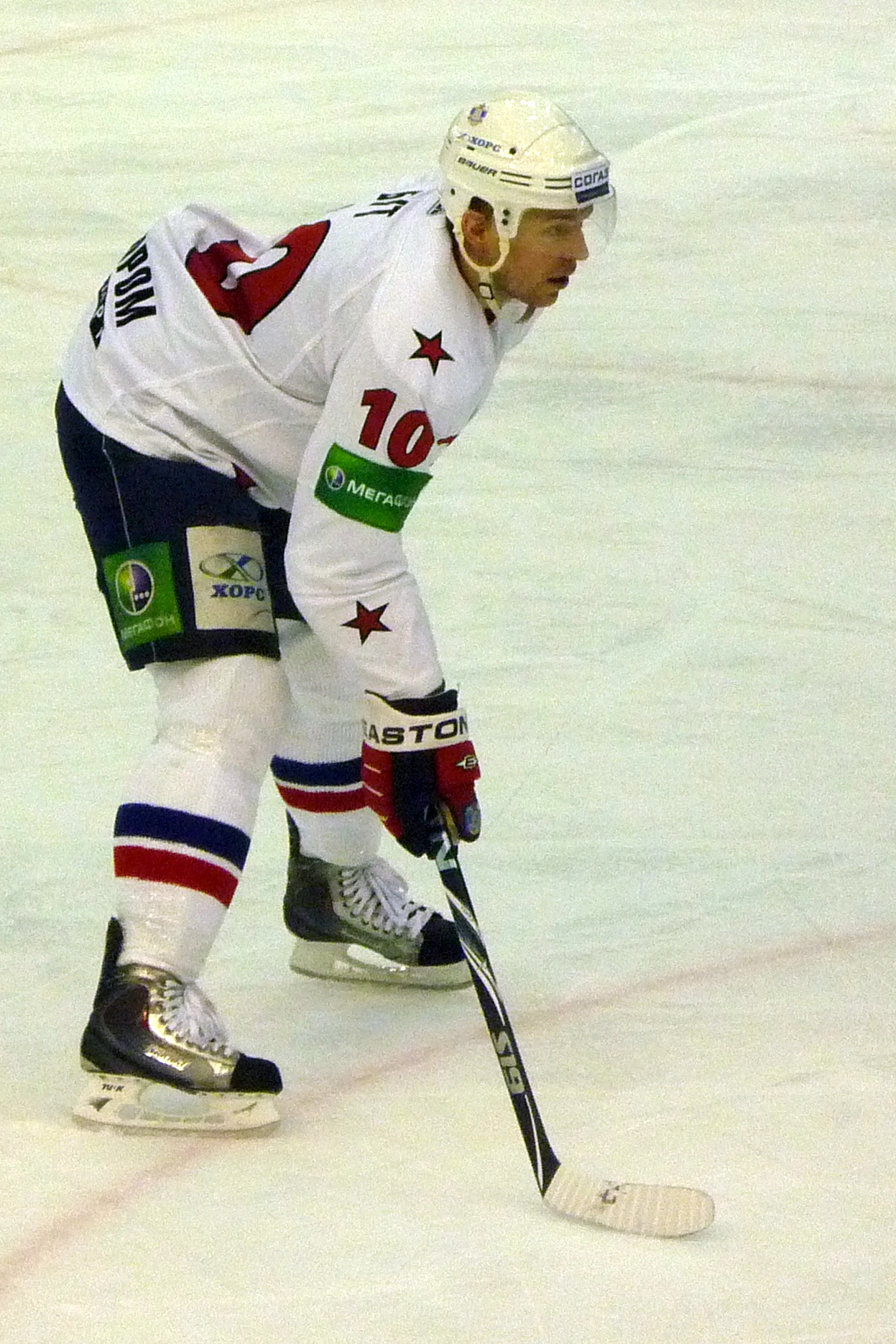
- Born: July 3, 1980 (age 45) Kharkiv, Ukraine, Soviet Union
- Height: 6 ft 2 in (188 cm)
- Weight: 214 lb (97 kg; 15 st 4 lb)
- Position: Left wing
- Shot: Left
- Played for: Lokomotiv Yaroslavl; SKA Saint Petersburg; CSKA Moscow; Metallurg Magnitogorsk; HC Yugra; Severstal Cherepovets
- National team: Russia
- NHL draft: 119th overall, 1998; New Jersey Devils
- Playing career: 1998–2015

Anton Mykolaiovych But (Ukrainian: Антон Миколайович Бут; born July 3, 1980) is a Ukrainian-Russian former professional ice hockey winger who currently played over 300 games in the Kontinental Hockey League (KHL). He was selected by the New Jersey Devils in the 5th round (119th overall) of the 1998 NHL entry draft.

== Career statistics ==
			Regular season					Playoffs
Season	Team	League	GP	G	A	Pts	PIM	GP	G	A	Pts	PIM
1996–97	Torpedo Yaroslavl-2	Russia3	55	18	10	28	8	—	—	—	—	—
1997–98	Torpedo Yaroslavl-2	Russia2	22	4	3	7	14	—	—	—	—	—
1998–99	Torpedo Yaroslavl	Russia	5	0	0	0	0	—	—	—	—	—
1998–99	Torpedo Yaroslavl-2	Russia2	22	12	8	20	59	—	—	—	—	—
1999–00	Torpedo Yaroslavl	Russia	28	2	5	7	16	8	2	1	3	0
1999–00	Torpedo Yaroslavl-2	Russia3	1	0	0	0	2	—	—	—	—	—
2000–01	Lokomotiv Yaroslavl	Russia	42	14	6	20	14	11	1	3	4	8
2000–01	Lokomotiv Yaroslavl-2	Russia3	1	2	0	2	0	—	—	—	—	—
2001–02	Lokomotiv Yaroslavl	Russia	48	14	11	25	12	5	0	1	1	2
2002–03	Lokomotiv Yaroslavl	Russia	44	16	13	29	16	9	1	2	3	6
2002–03	Lokomotiv Yaroslavl-2	Russia3	2	2	0	2	2	—	—	—	—	—
2003–04	Lokomotiv Yaroslavl	Russia	51	11	10	21	24	3	0	0	0	0
2004–05	Lokomotiv Yaroslavl	Russia	60	12	22	34	58	8	3	3	6	0
2005–06	Lokomotiv Yaroslavl	Russia	49	16	21	37	26	11	2	1	3	2
2006–07	SKA Saint Petersburg	Russia	52	13	13	26	61	2	0	1	1	2
2007–08	SKA Saint Petersburg	Russia	57	15	13	28	40	9	4	1	5	6
2008–09	HC CSKA Moscow	KHL	55	12	21	33	36	8	2	1	3	2
2009–10	SKA Saint Petersburg	KHL	56	19	9	28	30	4	0	0	0	2
2010–11	SKA Saint Petersburg	KHL	53	12	24	36	28	11	3	2	5	2
2011–12	Metallurg Magnitogorsk	KHL	46	10	10	20	32	12	2	0	2	4
2012–13	Yugra Khanty-Mansiysk	KHL	39	13	18	31	22	—	—	—	—	—
2013–14	Lokomotiv Yaroslavl	KHL	25	3	5	8	24	—	—	—	—	—
2013–14	Dizel Penza	VHL	3	2	0	2	0	—	—	—	—	—
2014–15	Severstal Cherepovets	KHL	5	0	0	0	2	—	—	—	—	—
KHL totals			279	69	87	156	174	35	7	3	10	10
Russia totals			436	113	114	227	267	66	13	13	26	26
