= Jussi Pesonen =

Finnish ice hockey player (born 1979)

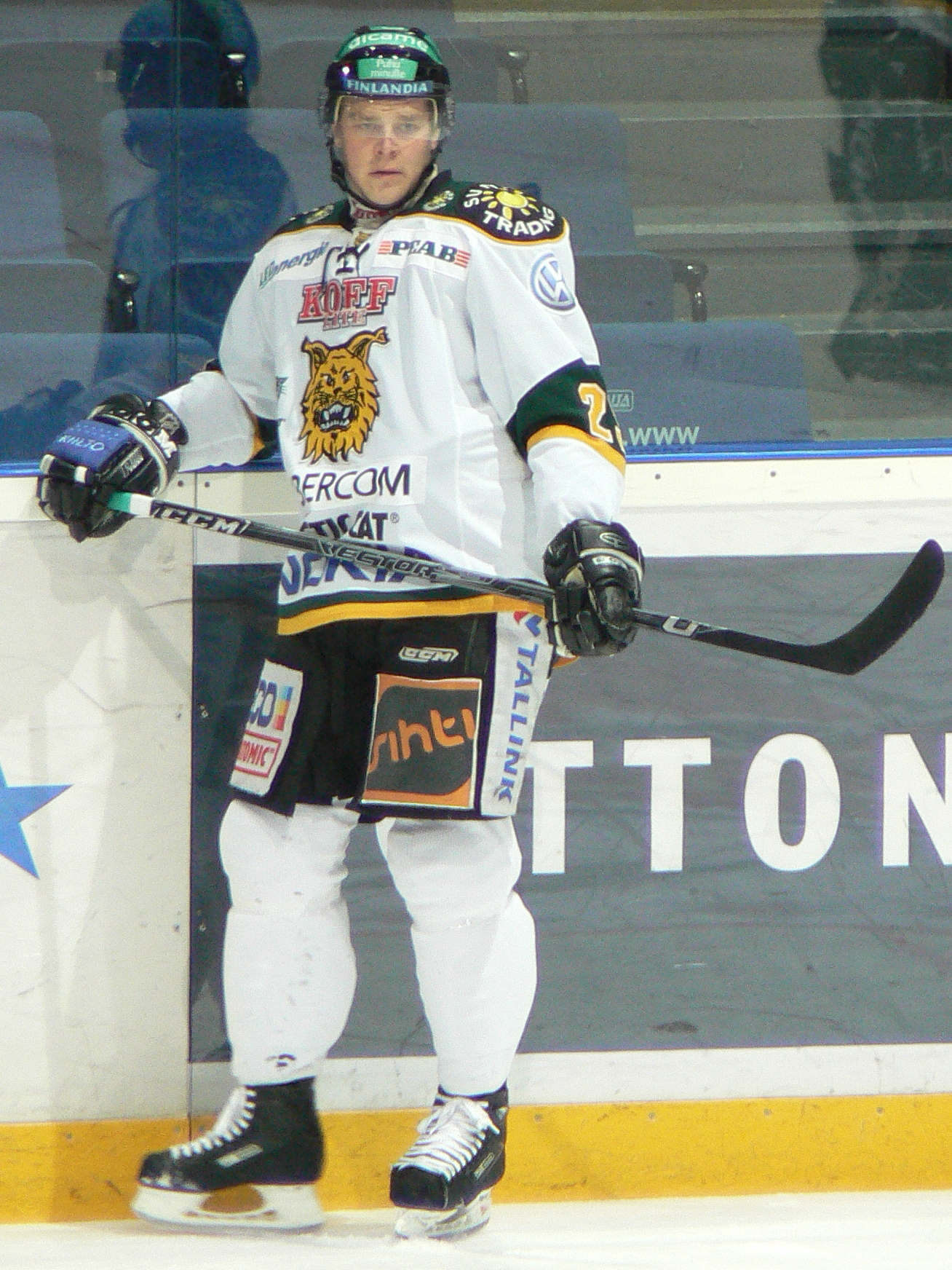
- Born: 23 May 1979 (age 47) Muurame, Finland
- Height: 6 ft 2 in (188 cm)
- Weight: 192 lb (87 kg; 13 st 10 lb)
- Position: Forward
- Shot: Left
- Liiga team: Vaasan Sport
- National team: Finland
- Playing career: 1997–2018

Jussi Pesonen (born 23 May 1979) is a Finnish former professional ice hockey player. During the 2014–15 season, he played for Vaasan Sport of the Liiga.

== Personal ==
Pesonen's brother is Harri Pesonen.

== Career statistics ==
			Regular season					Playoffs
Season	Team	League	GP	G	A	Pts	PIM	GP	G	A	Pts	PIM
1994–95	JYP Jyväskylä U16	U16 SM-sarja	28	8	10	18	69	—	—	—	—	—
1995–96	JYP Jyväskylä U18	U18 SM-sarja	27	3	6	9	32	—	—	—	—	—
1995–96	JYP Jyväskylä U20	U20 SM-liiga	2	0	0	0	0	—	—	—	—	—
1996–97	JYP Jyväskylä U18	U18 SM-sarja	23	9	10	19	44	—	—	—	—	—
1996–97	JYP Jyväskylä U20	U20 SM-liiga	16	1	0	1	6	6	0	0	0	6
1997–98	JYP Jyväskylä U20	U20 SM-liiga	25	9	10	19	38	—	—	—	—	—
1997–98	JYP Jyväskylä	SM-liiga	17	1	2	3	6	—	—	—	—	—
1998–99	JYP Jyväskylä U20	U20 SM-liiga	23	10	7	17	34	—	—	—	—	—
1998–99	JYP Jyväskylä	SM-liiga	27	1	4	5	10	3	0	0	0	2
1999–00	JYP Jyväskylä U20	U20 SM-liiga	5	4	3	7	2	2	0	0	0	12
1999–00	JYP Jyväskylä	SM-liiga	51	4	6	10	83	—	—	—	—	—
2000–01	JYP Jyväskylä	SM-liiga	49	11	14	25	34	—	—	—	—	—
2001–02	Jokerit	SM-liiga	53	11	6	17	24	12	2	2	4	2
2002–03	Jokerit	SM-liiga	52	10	10	20	18	10	1	0	1	27
2003–04	Jokerit	SM-liiga	47	6	5	11	41	8	1	1	2	6
2004–05	Ilves	SM-liiga	50	10	14	24	126	5	0	1	1	25
2005–06	Ilves	SM-liiga	54	19	25	44	78	4	0	0	0	4
2006–07	Ilves	SM-liiga	46	9	22	31	106	7	0	2	2	43
2007–08	HIFK	SM-liiga	31	10	16	26	45	7	0	1	1	8
2008–09	HIFK	SM-liiga	52	12	21	33	59	2	0	1	1	4
2009–10	Ilves	SM-liiga	40	18	21	39	69	—	—	—	—	—
2009–10	Leksands IF	HockeyAllsvenskan	13	3	6	9	2	10	4	1	5	8
2010–11	Leksands IF	HockeyAllsvenskan	20	2	7	9	14	—	—	—	—	—
2010–11	KalPa	SM-liiga	32	13	4	17	8	7	1	4	5	35
2011–12	Lukko	SM-liiga	40	9	12	21	36	—	—	—	—	—
2012–13	Lukko	SM-liiga	13	6	5	11	4	—	—	—	—	—
2013–14	Ilves	Liiga	30	3	2	5	14	—	—	—	—	—
2013–14	LeKi	Mestis	5	1	1	2	2	—	—	—	—	—
2013–14	KalPa	Liiga	2	0	1	1	2	—	—	—	—	—
2014–15	LeKi	Mestis	12	1	3	4	37	—	—	—	—	—
2014–15	Vaasan Sport	Liiga	35	1	6	7	6	—	—	—	—	—
2015–16	Pyry	Suomi-sarja	25	15	15	30	20	6	2	4	6	31
2016–17	Pyry	Suomi-sarja	33	11	22	33	34	5	1	1	2	32
2017–18	Vire	III-Divisioona	2	1	2	3	0	7	9	13	22	2
Liiga totals			721	154	196	350	769	65	5	12	17	156
