= Lukáš Mensator =

Czech ice hockey goaltender

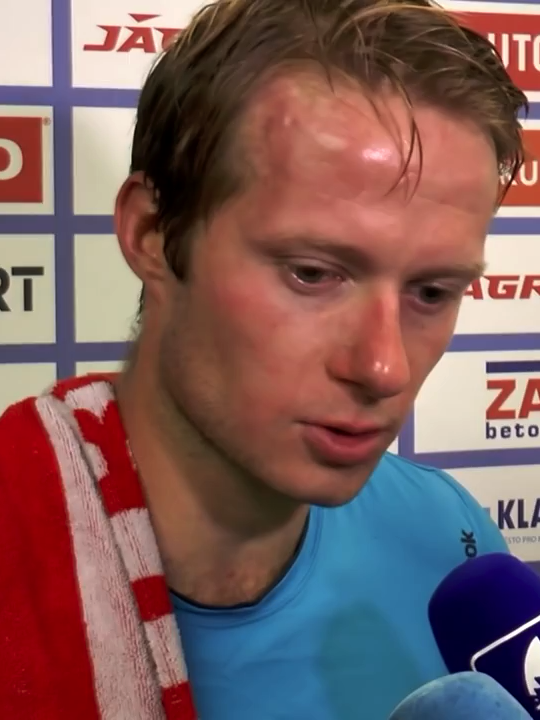
- Mensator in 2015
- Born: August 18, 1984 (age 41) Sokolov, Czechoslovakia
- Height: 5 ft 9 in (175 cm)
- Weight: 181 lb (82 kg; 12 st 13 lb)
- Position: Goaltender
- Caught: Right
- Played for: HC Karlovy Vary; HC Plzeň
- National team: Czech Republic
- NHL draft: 83rd overall, 2002; Vancouver Canucks
- Playing career: 2004–2017

Lukáš Mensator (born August 18, 1984) is a Czech former professional ice hockey goaltender. He currently works as a goaltending coach for HC Baník Sokolov of the Chance Liga.

Mensator played in the Czech Extraliga with HC Karlovy Vary and HC Plzeň. He was selected by the Vancouver Canucks in the 3rd round (83rd overall) of the 2002 NHL entry draft.
