= Václav Skuhravý =

Czech ice hockey player

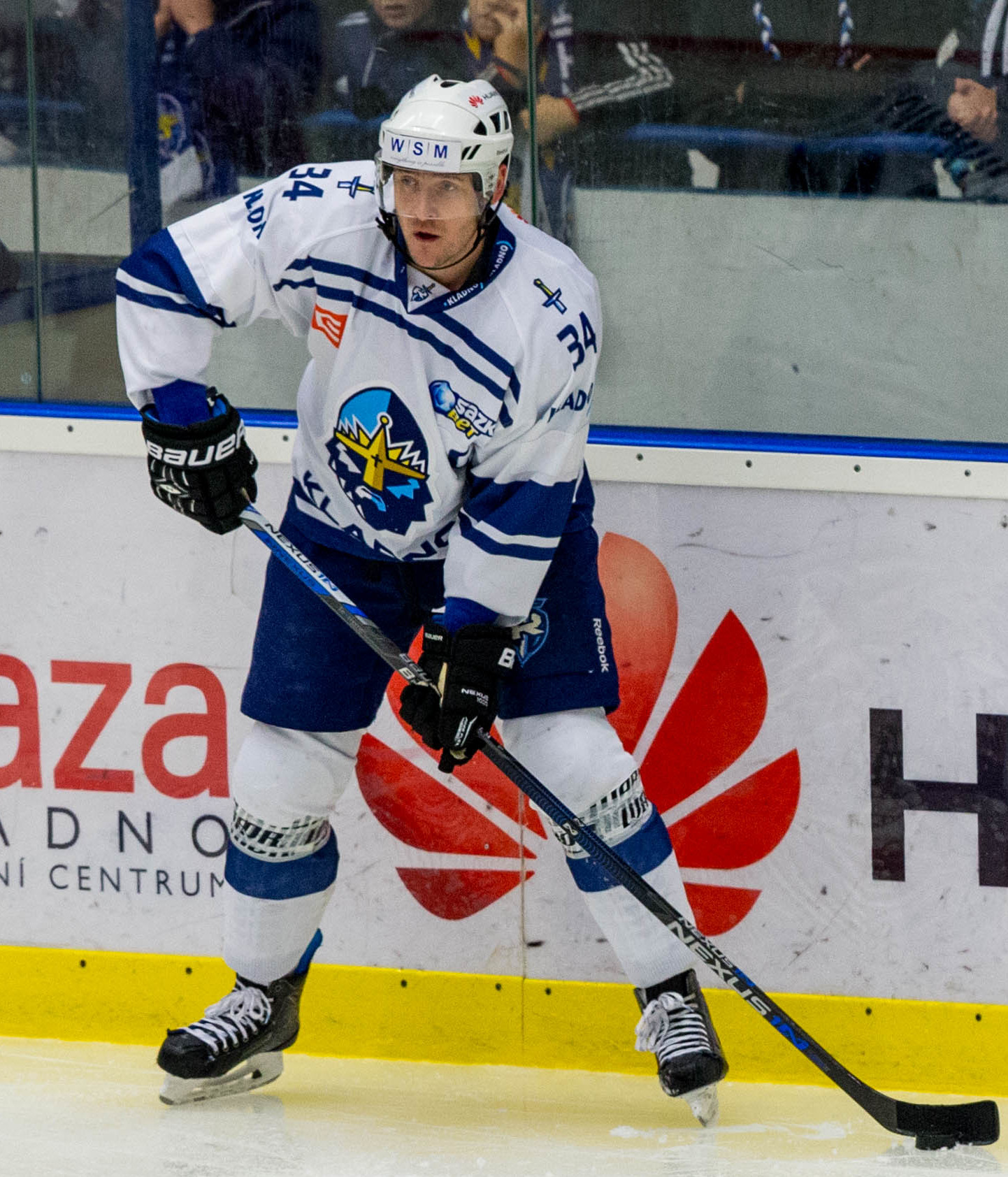
- Václav Skuhravý in 2015
- Born: January 16, 1979 (age 47) Slaný, Czechoslovakia
- Height: 6 ft 3 in (191 cm)
- Weight: 220 lb (100 kg; 15 st 10 lb)
- Position: Forward
- Shoots: Left
- Czech Extraliga team Former teams: HC Energie Karlovy Vary; HC Litvínov; HC Kladno
- National team: Czech Republic
- Playing career: 1999–present

Václav Skuhravý (born January 16, 1979) is a Czech ice hockey player, playing currently for HC Energie Karlovy Vary in Czech Extraliga, with whom he is contracted until 2021. He is a forward, and has played for the national team.

== International play ==
Skuhravý first played for the Czech national team in the 2005–06 season, and also played for the national team in the 2008 World Championship.
