= Stefan Pettersson (ice hockey) =

Swedish ice hockey player

- Born: June 19, 1977 (age 47); Farsta, SWE
- Height: 6 ft 3 in (191 cm)
- Weight: 201 lb (91 kg; 14 st 5 lb)
- Position: Left wing
- Shoots: Left
- SEL team Former teams: Södertälje SK; HV71; Djurgårdens IF; Linköpings HC
- Playing career: 2001–present

Stefan Pettersson (born June 19, 1977 in Farsta, Sweden) is a Swedish professional ice hockey player with Södertälje SK in the Swedish elite league Elitserien.

== Playing career ==
Pettersson is a hardworking, quick forward with a powerful and well-aimed shot. During his career he has played for four clubs in the Stockholm area; Huddinge IK, Hammarby IF, Haninge HC and Djurgårdens IF. In the 2000–01 season Pettersson played for Linköpings HC and helped the club clinch one of the two promotion spots for play in Sweden's top ice hockey league Elitserien.

== Awards ==
- Nominated for Elitserien Rookie of the Year in 2002.
- Played in the Elitserien All-Star Game in 2002.

== Career statistics ==
			Regular season					Playoffs
Season	Team	League	GP	G	A	Pts	PIM	GP	G	A	Pts	PIM
1995–96	Huddinge IK	Swe-3	1	0	0	0	0	—	—	—	—	—
1996–97	Huddinge IK	Swe-3	9	0	0	0	2	—	—	—	—	—
1996–97	Hammarby IF	Swe-3	19	1	0	1	4	—	—	—	—	—
1997–98	Haninge HC	Swe-3	26	12	8	20	6	—	—	—	—	—
1998–99	Hammarby IF	Swe-3	34	17	10	27	18	5	3	2	5	2
1999–00	IK Oskarshamn	Swe-2	46	28	18	46	16	2	1	1	2	0
2000–01	Linköpings HC	Swe-2	32	15	5	20	18	9	2	2	4	6
2001–02	Linköpings HC	SEL	48	14	8	22	16	—	—	—	—	—
2002–03	Linköpings HC	SEL	36	7	10	17	6	—	—	—	—	—
2003–04	Djurgårdens IF	SEL	50	18	16	34	28	2	0	0	0	2
2004–05	HV71	SEL	49	8	4	12	60	—	—	—	—	—
2005–06	HV71	SEL	45	18	22	40	59	12	9	5	14	24
2006–07	HV71	SEL	46	12	6	18	83	14	1	2	3	39
2007–08	HV71	SEL	27	3	5	8	22	—	—	—	—	—
2007–08	Södertälje SK	SEL	28	9	7	16	16	—	—	—	—	—
2008–09	Södertälje SK	SEL	37	8	6	14	30	—	—	—	—	—
SEL totals			366	97	84	181	320	28	10	7	17	65
