= Teemu Aalto =

Finnish professional ice hockey player

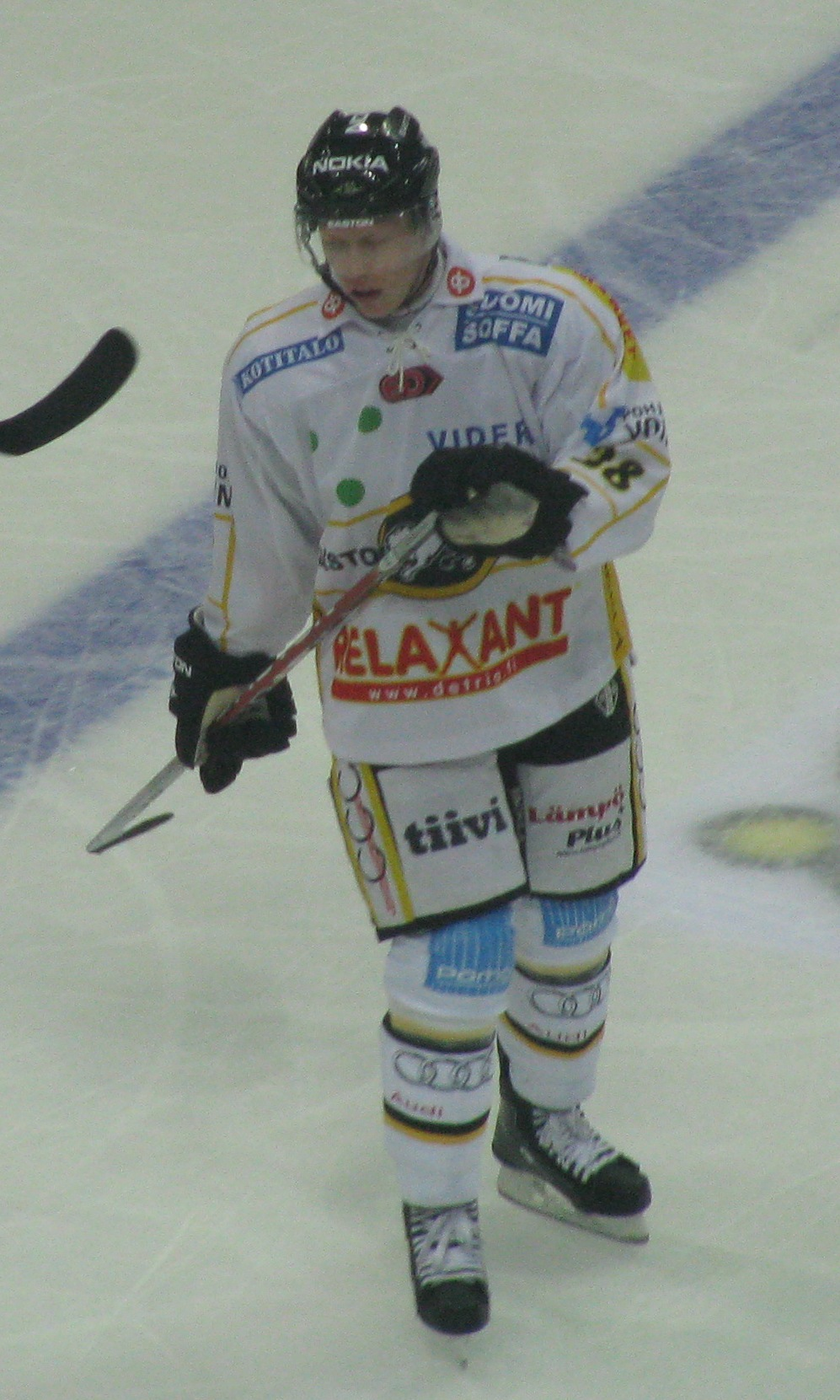
- Born: 30 March 1978 (age 46); Kokkola, Finland
- Height: 1.81 m (5 ft 11 in)
- Weight: 86 kg (190 lb; 13 st 8 lb)
- Position: Defence
- Shot: Right
- Played for: Tappara; Lukko; Kärpät; Linköpings HC; Timrå IK; SC Bern; HC Sierre-Anniviers; HPK; Ilves
- National team: Finland
- Playing career: 1999–2017

Teemu Matias Aalto (born 30 March 1978) is a Finnish former professional ice hockey player. He played in the for Ilves in the Finnish Liiga.

== Career statistics ==
=== Regular season and playoffs ===
			Regular season					Playoffs
Season	Team	League	GP	G	A	Pts	PIM	GP	G	A	Pts	PIM
2015–16	Tappara	Liiga	50	4	21	25	18	14	2	0	2	2
2014–15	Tappara	Liiga	59	11	24	35	26	20	2	6	8	14
2013–14	Tappara	Liiga	50	6	10	16	42	19	0	1	1	14
2012–13	Tappara	SM-liiga	58	6	22	28	50	15	5	7	12	16
2011–12	Lukko	SM-liiga	54	9	21	30	54	3	0	1	1	4
2010–11	Lukko	SM-liiga	57	8	19	27	44	12	0	4	4	8
2009–10	Kärpät	SM-liiga	52	13	13	26	54	10	0	2	2	10
2008–09	Linköpings HC	Elitserien	47	11	18	29	36	7	1	3	4	4
2007–08	Tappara	SM-liiga	56	15	25	40	56	11	1	3	4	14
2006–07	Tappara	SM-liiga	56	7	23	30	84	5	1	0	1	6
2005–06	Timrå IK	Elitserien	49	3	17	20	52	–	–	–	–	–
2005–06	SC Bern	NLA	–	–	–	–	–	1	0	0	0	0
2005–06	HC Sierre-Anniviers	NLB	–	–	–	–	–	4	0	5	5	6
2004–05	Timrå IK	Elitserien	50	5	23	28	56	7	1	1	2	6
2003–04	HPK	SM-liiga	56	13	13	26	38	8	1	2	3	10
2002–03	HPK	SM-liiga	54	9	15	24	34	13	2	1	3	10
2001–02	HPK	SM-liiga	56	13	17	30	40	8	0	1	1	4
2000–01	HPK	SM-liiga	53	3	9	12	34	–	–	–	–	–
2000–01	FPS	Mestis	2	0	0	0	0	–	–	–	–	–
1999–2000	HPK	SM-liiga	54	3	7	10	12	8	0	0	0	0
1998–99	Hermes	Suomi-sarja	48	14	24	38	54	3	0	1	1	4
1997–98	Hermes	Suomi-sarja	41	7	12	19	14	7	0	2	2	8
1996–97	Hermes	Suomi-sarja	43	1	8	9	18	3	0	0	0	0
Liiga totals			765	120	239	359	586	146	14	28	42	112
SHL totals			146	19	58	77	144	14	2	4	6	10
