= Lukáš Zíb =

- Born: 24 February 1977 (age 49) České Budějovice, Czechoslovakia
- Height: 6 ft 1 in (185 cm)
- Weight: 214 lb (97 kg; 15 st 4 lb)
- Position: Defence
- Shot: Left
- Played for: HC Ceske Budejovice; IHC Pisek; KLH Vajgar Jindřichův Hradec; HC Barum Continental Zlín; HC Becherovka Karlovy Vary; Espoo Blues; SERC Wild Wings; Torpedo Nizhny Novgorod; Molot-Prikamye Perm; Vityaz Chekhov; Bili Tygri Liberec; BK Mlada Boleslav; HC Ocelari Trinec; HC Vitkovice Steel; Cracovia Krakow; EHC Freiburg
- National team: Czech Republic
- NHL draft: 57th overall, 1995; Edmonton Oilers
- Playing career: 1994–2018

Lukáš Zíb (born 24 February 1977) is a Czech former professional ice hockey player.

== Career ==
Zíb was selected by the Edmonton Oilers in the third round (57th overall) of the 1995 NHL entry draft.

Zíb played in the Czech Extraliga for HC Ceske Budejovice, HC Barum Continental Zlín, HC Becherovka Karlovy Vary, Bili Tygri Liberec, BK Mlada Boleslav, HC Oceláři Třinec and HC Vítkovice in the Czech Extraliga during the 2010–11 season.

He also played in the SM-liiga for Espoo Blues, the Deutsche Eishockey Liga for SERC Wild Wings and the Russian Superleague for Torpedo Nizhny Novgorod, Molot-Prikamye Perm and Vityaz Chekhov.

== Career statistics ==
			Regular season					Playoffs
Season	Team	League	GP	G	A	Pts	PIM	GP	G	A	Pts	PIM
1994–95	HC Ceske Budejovice U18	Czech U18	22	3	6	9	—	—	—	—	—	—
1994–95	HC Ceske Budejovice	Czech	13	1	0	1	16	9	1	0	1	6
1995–96	HC Ceske Budejovice U20	Czech U20	22	7	3	10	—	—	—	—	—	—
1995–96	HC Ceske Budejovice	Czech	9	1	0	1	0	2	0	0	0	0
1995–96	HC Jitex Pisek	Czech2	1	0	0	0	—	—	—	—	—	—
1996–97	HC Ceske Budejovice	Czech	12	0	0	0	4	2	0	0	0	0
1996–97	KLH Vajgar Jindřichův Hradec	Czech2	10	0	0	0	—	—	—	—	—	—
1997–98	HC Ceske Budejovice	Czech	47	5	6	11	22	—	—	—	—	—
1998–99	HC Ceske Budejovice	Czech	22	1	4	5	14	—	—	—	—	—
1999–00	HC Ceske Budejovice	Czech	38	3	6	9	12	1	0	0	0	0
2000–01	HC Ceske Budejovice	Czech	22	2	3	5	16	—	—	—	—	—
2000–01	HC Barum Continental Zlín	Czech	19	4	3	7	8	—	—	—	—	—
2001–02	HC Becherovka Karlovy Vary	Czech	36	4	10	14	20	—	—	—	—	—
2001–02	Espoo Blues	Liiga	5	0	0	0	2	—	—	—	—	—
2002–03	SERC Wild Wings	DEL	49	3	11	14	52	—	—	—	—	—
2003–04	Torpedo Nizhny Novgorod	Russia	47	8	5	13	44	—	—	—	—	—
2003–04	Molot-Prikamye Perm	Russia2	9	5	7	12	20	11	1	2	3	12
2004–05	Molot-Prikamye Perm	Russia	57	0	5	5	36	—	—	—	—	—
2005–06	Vityaz Chekhov	Russia	36	2	2	4	67	—	—	—	—	—
2005–06	Vityaz Podolsk-2	Russia3	14	6	9	15	20	—	—	—	—	—
2006–07	Bili Tygri Liberec	Czech	50	15	5	20	114	12	3	1	4	20
2007–08	Bili Tygri Liberec	Czech	41	10	6	16	52	11	2	1	3	8
2008–09	Bili Tygri Liberec	Czech	45	8	9	17	54	—	—	—	—	—
2008–09	BK Mlada Boleslav	Czech	7	0	3	3	10	—	—	—	—	—
2009–10	HC Ocelari Trinec	Czech	52	5	22	27	80	5	0	2	2	2
2010–11	HC Ocelari Trinec	Czech	52	6	15	21	99	18	5	7	12	14
2011–12	HC Ocelari Trinec	Czech	52	5	22	27	98	5	2	1	3	4
2012–13	HC Ocelari Trinec	Czech	52	8	24	32	80	13	5	5	10	16
2013–14	HC Ocelari Trinec	Czech	29	4	2	6	14	10	1	2	3	8
2014–15	HC Vitkovice Steel	Czech	51	2	16	18	32	3	0	0	0	0
2015–16	Motor Ceske Budejovice	Czech2	49	7	15	22	72	9	1	3	4	6
2016–17	Motor Ceske Budejovice	Czech2	13	3	5	8	6	—	—	—	—	—
2016–17	Cracovia Krakow	Poland	8	1	1	2	8	16	6	3	9	12
2017–18	Cracovia Krakow	Poland	31	2	23	25	20	—	—	—	—	—
2017–18	EHC Freiburg	DEL2	4	1	0	1	4	—	—	—	—	—
Czech totals			649	84	156	240	745	102	23	23	46	104
