= Petr Kumstát =

Czech ice hockey player

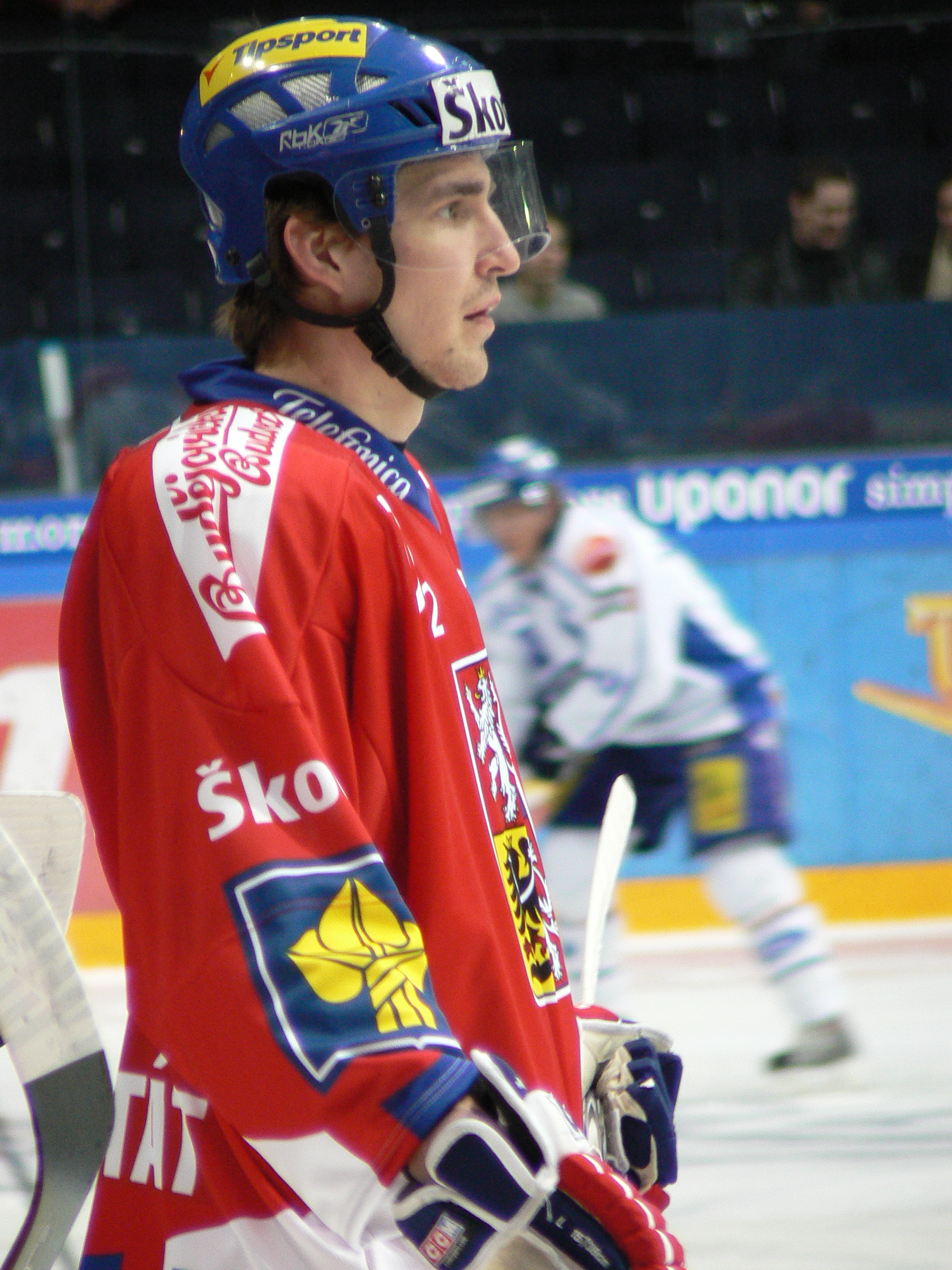
- Born: November 19, 1981 (age 44) Prostějov, Czechoslovakia
- Height: 6 ft 6 in (198 cm)
- Weight: 212 lb (96 kg; 15 st 2 lb)
- Position: Forward
- Shot: Left
- Czech Extraliga team: HC Sparta Praha
- Playing career: 2000–2019

Petr Kumstát (born November 19, 1981) is a Czech professional ice hockey player. He played with HC Karlovy Vary in the Czech Extraliga during the 2010–11 Czech Extraliga season.
