= Josef Melichar =

Czech ice hockey player

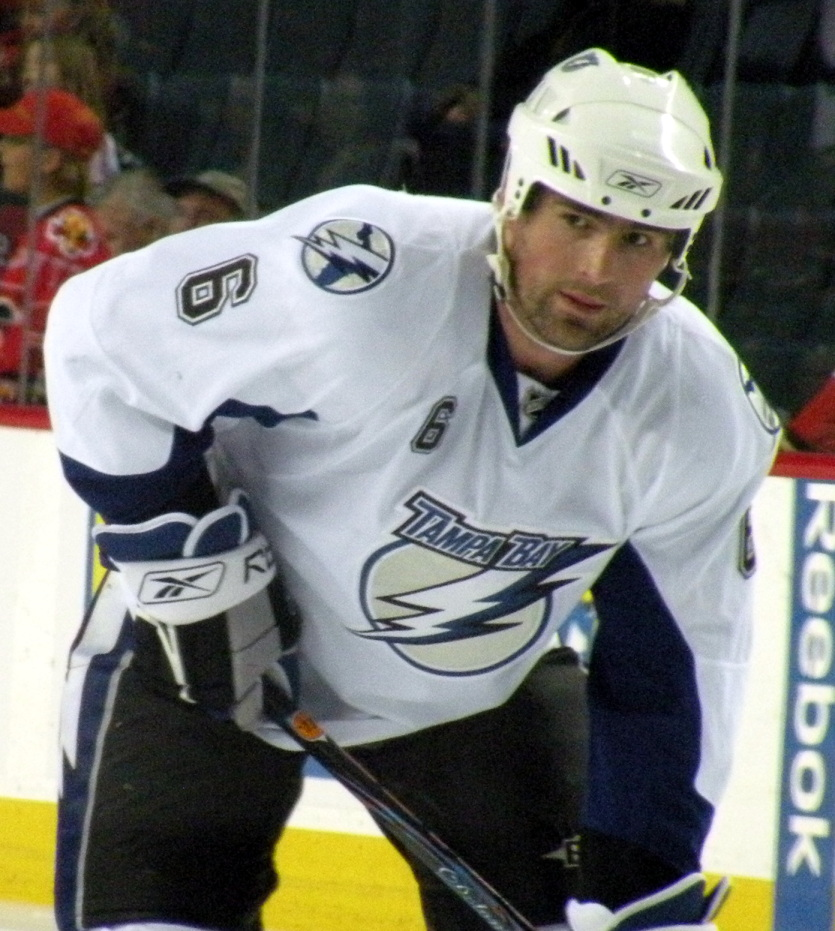
- Born: January 20, 1979 (age 47) České Budějovice, Czechoslovakia
- Height: 6 ft 2 in (188 cm)
- Weight: 220 lb (100 kg; 15 st 10 lb)
- Position: Defence
- Shot: Left
- Played for: Carolina Hurricanes; HC Sparta Praha; Pittsburgh Penguins; Tampa Bay Lightning; HC České Budějovice; Linköpings HC
- NHL draft: 71st overall, 1997; Pittsburgh Penguins
- Playing career: 1999–2011

Josef Melichar IV (born January 20, 1979) is a Czech former professional ice hockey defenceman.

== Playing career ==
Melichar was drafted in the 3rd round (71st overall) by the Penguins in the 1997 NHL entry draft. He played two junior seasons with the Tri-City Americans of the Canadian Hockey League (CHL) from 1997 to 1999, and was nominated for the Western Hockey League (WHL)'s top defenceman award in 1998. The award would go to future Penguins teammate and frequent defense partner Michal Rozsíval.

Melichar's first pro season was spent with the Wilkes-Barre/Scranton Penguins of the American Hockey League (AHL) in their inaugural 1999–00 season. He was the only member of the team to play in all 80 games.

Melichar made his NHL debut as a 21-year-old in October 2000, and played in 18 games for the Pittsburgh Penguins. The Penguins were stacked with Czech players that season, with Melichar being one of eleven to suit up for the team. The Penguins' coach that year was Ivan Hlinka, who was himself Czech. Josef was sent down to Wilkes-Barre/Scranton and participated in their long playoff run, which ended with a loss in the 2001 Calder Cup finals.

He became a permanent fixture on Pittsburgh's blueline in 2001–02, with a strong rookie season that ended prematurely with a shoulder injury. After being rewarded with a one-way contract, Melichar only played eight games in the 2002–03 season due to re-aggravation of the shoulder injury.

After several shoulder surgeries, Melichar came prepared for training camp in 2003, only to injure the same shoulder yet again. However, the injury was not as severe as expected, and he was able to play in all 82 games in the 2003–04 season. He also scored his first NHL goal that season (in his 137th NHL game) against John Grahame and the Tampa Bay Lightning on January 27, 2004, in a 6-2 Penguins loss.

After playing for HC Sparta Praha in the Czech Republic during the 2004–05 NHL lockout, he signed a multi-year contract with Pittsburgh on August 15, 2005. He was named an alternate captain for the 2005–06 Penguins on March 11, 2006. Melichar finished the season with 3 goals and 12 assists for a career high 15 points in 72 games.

Melichar in his sixth and final season with the Pittsburgh Penguins, was partnered on the 2nd defensive pairing with Rob Scuderi. He was second on the team in blocked shots and maintained a strong plus-minus rating throughout the season, while playing against opposing teams' top players. Without a contract offer from the Penguins, Melichar left for Europe and played with HC České Budějovice in the Czech Extraliga and Linköpings HC in the Swedish Elitserien.

On July 1, 2008, Melichar signed with the Carolina Hurricanes. Melichar was then traded by the Hurricanes, along with Wade Brookbank and a fourth round draft pick in the 2009 NHL entry draft, to the Tampa Bay Lightning for Jussi Jokinen on February 7, 2009. He then left his club the Tampa Bay Lightning in July 2009 and he then turned back to his hometown České Budějovice and signed for HC České Budějovice.

On August 10, 2010, Melichar signed a contract with Linköpings HC, marking his second tenure at the Swedish club.

On July 5, 2011, Melichar signed with HC Pardubice, making it his fourth time that he has played in Pardubice.

== Retirement ==
Melichar abruptly announced his retirement on August 18, 2011, only a month after signing his one-year contract. A statement released from HC Pardubice read: "After a long deliberation, taking into account his family situation, [Josef Melichar] decided this season to retire from hockey for personal reasons and asked us for early termination of the recently signed professional contract with our club."

Michal Sivek, Melichar's agent and former teammate, would not elaborate on Melichar's retirement other than saying "He simply has no desire to play hockey."

== Career statistics ==
=== Regular season and playoffs ===
			Regular season					Playoffs
Season	Team	League	GP	G	A	Pts	PIM	GP	G	A	Pts	PIM
1995–96	HC České Budějovice	CZE U18	38	3	4	7		—	—	—	—	—
1996–97	HC České Budějovice	CZE U20	41	2	3	5	10	—	—	—	—	—
1997–98	Tri–City Americans	WHL	67	9	24	33	152	—	—	—	—	—
1998–99	Tri–City Americans	WHL	65	8	28	36	125	11	1	0	1	15
1999–2000	Wilkes–Barre/Scranton Penguins	AHL	80	3	9	12	126	—	—	—	—	—
2000–01	Pittsburgh Penguins	NHL	18	0	2	2	21	—	—	—	—	—
2000–01	Wilkes–Barre/Scranton Penguins	AHL	46	2	5	7	69	21	0	5	5	6
2001–02	Pittsburgh Penguins	NHL	60	0	3	3	68	—	—	—	—	—
2002–03	Pittsburgh Penguins	NHL	8	0	0	0	2	—	—	—	—	—
2003–04	Pittsburgh Penguins	NHL	82	3	5	8	62	—	—	—	—	—
2004–05	HC Sparta Praha	ELH	13	0	4	4	8	5	0	0	0	6
2005–06	Pittsburgh Penguins	NHL	72	3	12	15	66	—	—	—	—	—
2006–07	Pittsburgh Penguins	NHL	70	1	11	12	44	5	0	0	0	2
2007–08	HC Mountfield	ELH	6	0	0	0	4	—	—	—	—	—
2007–08	Linköpings HC	SEL	50	0	8	8	74	16	1	1	2	39
2008–09	Carolina Hurricanes	NHL	15	0	4	4	8	—	—	—	—	—
2008–09	Albany River Rats	AHL	25	1	4	5	35	—	—	—	—	—
2008–09	Tampa Bay Lightning	NHL	24	0	5	5	29	—	—	—	—	—
2008–09	Norfolk Admirals	AHL	1	0	0	0	0	—	—	—	—	—
2009–10	HC Mountfield	ELH	52	5	9	14	80	5	0	0	0	6
2010–11	HC Mountfield	ELH	12	0	1	1	8	—	—	—	—	—
2010–11	Linköpings HC	SEL	41	0	5	5	24	7	0	0	0	2
AHL totals			152	6	18	24	230	21	0	5	5	6
NHL totals			349	7	42	49	300	5	0	0	0	2
ELH totals			83	5	14	19	98	10	0	0	0	12

=== International ===
Year	Team	Event	GP	G	A	Pts	PIM
1997	Czech Republic	EJC	6	0	1	1	6

== Transactions ==
- 2007 – Signed as free agent by Linköpings HC in Elitserien
- July 2, 2008 – Signed 1 year, $1 million contract with the Carolina Hurricanes for the 2008–2009 NHL season.
- February 7, 2009 – Traded, along with Wade Brookbank and a fourth round draft pick in the 2009 NHL entry draft to the Tampa Bay Lightning for Jussi Jokinen
