= Štěpán Hřebejk =

Czech ice hockey player

- Born: 28 May 1982 (age 44) Strakonice, Czechoslovakia
- Height: 5 ft 9 in (175 cm)
- Weight: 175 lb (79 kg; 12 st 7 lb)
- Position: Forward
- Shoots: Right
- team Former teams: Free agent HC České Budějovice; Vsetínská hokejová HC Karlovy Vary; Piráti Chomutov; HC Nové Zámky
- Playing career: 2001–present

Štěpán Hřebejk (born 28 May 1982 in Strakonice) is a Czech professional ice hockey player. He is currently a free agent having last played for HC David Servis České Budějovice of the 2nd Czech Republic Hockey League.

Hřebejk played 603 games in the Czech Extraliga, playing for HC České Budějovice, Vsetínská hokejová, HC Karlovy Vary and Piráti Chomutov. He also played in the Tipsport Liga for HC Nové Zámky.
