= 2009 Channel One Cup =

Tournament details
- Host countries: Russia; Czech Republic
- Cities: Moscow; Prague
- Venues: 2 (in 2 host cities)
- Dates: 17–20 December 2009
- Teams: 4

Final positions
- Champions: Finland (2nd title)
- Runners-up: Russia
- Third place: Czech Republic
- Fourth place: Sweden

Tournament statistics
- Games played: 6
- Goals scored: 36 (6 per game)
- Attendance: 66,063 (11,011 per game)
- Scoring leader: (Sweden) Mattias Weinhandl (5 points)

The 2009 Channel One Cup was played between 17 and 20 December 2009. The Czech Republic, Finland, Sweden and Russia played a round-robin for a total of three games per team and six games in total. Five of the matches were played in the Khodynka Arena in Moscow, Russia, and one match in O2 Arena in Prague, Czech Republic. Finland won the tournament. The tournament was a part of the 2009–10 Euro Hockey Tour.

== Standings ==
Pos	Team	Pld	W	OTW	OTL	L	GF	GA	GD	Pts
1	Finland	3	1	1	1	0	8	7	+1	6
2	Russia	3	1	1	0	1	10	9	+1	5
3	Czech Republic	3	0	1	2	0	8	9	−1	4
4	Sweden	3	0	1	1	1	10	11	−1	3

Source: eurohockey

== Games ==
All times are local. Moscow – (Moscow Time – UTC+3) Prague – (Central European Time – UTC+1)

17 December 2009; 17:30	Czech Republic	2-1 OT (1-1, 0-0, 0-0) (OT: 1–0)	Finland	O2 Arena, Prague; Attendance: 12,563

Game reference

Marek Schwarz
Goalies
Iiro Tarkki
Referees:
(Sweden) Sören Persson
(Sweden) Patrik Sjöberg
Linesmen:
(Czech Republic) Frantisek Kalivoda
(Czech Republic) Roman Pouzar

	0-1	06:41 – Immonen (Pettinen, Erkinjuntti)
Jágr (Blaťák, Čajánek) – 07:08	1-1
Čajánek (Čáslava, Jágr) – 61:40	2-1

10 min
Penalties
10 min
33
Shots
18

17 December 2009; 20:00	Sweden	3-4 (0-1, 2-2, 1-1)	Russia	Khodynka Arena, Moscow; Attendance: 13,000

Game reference

Henrik Karlsson
Goalies
Alexander Yeryomenko
Referees:
(Czech Republic) Milan Minar
(Czech Republic) Robin Sir
Linesmen:
(Russia) Viktor Birin
(Russia) Aleksei Medvedev

	0-1	00:39 – Tereshchenko (Nikulin, Morozov)
Weinhandl (Engqvist) – 22:51	1-1
	1-2	24:45 – Morozov (Zaripov) (PP)
	1-3	25:34 – Saprykin (Proshkin, Kondratyev) (PP)
Johansson (Mårtensson, Karlsson) – 28:56	2-3
Mårtensson (Weinhandl, Ericsson) – 42:05	3-3
	3-4	48:31 – Zinovjev (Kondratyev) (PP)

18 min
Penalties
14 min
18
Shots
23

19 December 2009; 12:00	Russia	2-3 (0-1, 1-0, 1-2)	Finland	Khodynka Arena, Moscow; Attendance: 13,000

Game reference

Georgy Gelashvili
Goalies
Teemu Lassila
Referees:
(Czech Republic) Milan Minar
(Czech Republic) Robin Sir
Linesmen:
(Russia) Viktor Birin
(Russia) Aleksei Medvedev

	0-1	03:55 – Hytönen (Komarov)
Mikhnov (Atyushov, Kozlov) – 26:17	1-1
Sushinsky (Kuryanov, Mozyakin) – 50:33	2-1
	2-2	52:14 – Immonen (Pettinen, Peltonen)
	2-3	59:53 – Kontiola

18 min
Penalties
20 min
33
Shots
21

19 December 2009; 18:00	Czech Republic	3-4 OT (0-0, 0-2, 3-1) (OT: 0–1)	Sweden	Khodynka Arena, Moscow; Attendance: 12,500

Game reference

Jakub Štěpánek
Goalies
Stefan Liv
Referees:
(Russia) Vyacheslav Bulanov
(Russia) Aleksei Ravodin
Linesmen:
(Russia) Vladimir Sivov
(Russia) Aleksandr Kalinkin

	0-1	25:53 – Weinhandl (Mårtensson, Ericsson) (PP)
	0-2	34:37 – Tjärnqvist (Åslund, Engqvist)
	0-3	43:12 – Weinhandl (Mårtensson) (PP)
Čajánek (Jágr, Blaťák) – 46:20	1-3
Klepiš – 49:02	2-3
Čajánek (Blaťák) (PP) – 59:49	3-3
	3-4	62:11 – Weinhandl (Tjärnqvist)

10 min
Penalties
12 min
27
Shots
20

20 December 2009; 12:00	Russia	4-3 GWS (1-0, 1-2, 1-1) (OT: 0–0) (SO: 0–1)	Czech Republic	Khodynka Arena, Moscow; Attendance: 13,000

Game reference

Vasily Koshechkin
Goalies
Marek Schwarz
Referees:
(Finland) Tom Laaksonen
(Finland) Antti Boman
Linesmen:
(Russia) Viktor Birin
(Russia) Aleksei Medvedev

Saprykin (Zaripov) – 15:11	1-0
Nikulin (Zaripov, Morozov) (PP) – 35:36	2-0
	2-1	38:38 – Němec (Novák) (PP)
	2-2	39:59 – Blaťák (Červenka, Jágr)
Radulov – 52:58	3-2
	3-3	54:52 – Červenka (Čajánek, Jágr)

Zaripov (miss)
Mozyakin
Morozov
Shootout
(miss) Klepiš
(miss) Marek
16 min
Penalties
12 min
24
Shots
34

20 December 2009; 18:00	Finland	4-3 GWS (0-1, 2-1, 1-1) (OT: 0–0) (SO: 1–0)	Sweden	Khodynka Arena, Moscow; Attendance: 2,500

Game reference

Iiro Tarkki
Goalies
Stefan Liv
Referees:
(Russia) Vyacheslav Bulanov
(Russia) Aleksei Ravodin
Linesmen:
(Russia) Vladimir Sivov
(Russia) Aleksandr Kalinkin

	0-1	12:00 – Johansson (Omark)
Hentunen (Peltonen, Mäenpää) (PP) – 31:49	1-1
	1-2	32:20 – Persson (Josefsson)
Peltonen (Hietanen, Lehterä) – 37:42	2-2
Peltonen (Immonen, Hentunen) – 52:06	3-2
	3-3	55:16 – Tjärnqvist (Omark, Persson)

Immonen
Peltonen (miss)
Hentunen (miss)
Immonen
Shootout
(miss) Weinhandl
(miss) Omark
Johansson
(miss) Johansson
6 min
Penalties
8 min
35
Shots
18

== Scoring leaders ==
Pos	Player	Country	GP	G	A	Pts	+/−	PIM	POS
1	Mattias Weinhandl	Sweden	3	4	1	5	+3	0	CE
2	Petr Čajánek	Czech Republic	3	3	2	5	+4	6	CE
3	Jaromír Jágr	Czech Republic	3	1	4	5	+4	4	RW
4	Jarkko Immonen	Finland	3	3	1	4	+3	0	CE
5	Ville Peltonen	Finland	3	2	2	4	+3	4	LW

TOI = Time on ice (minutes:seconds); SA = Shots against; GA = Goals against; GAA = Goals Against Average; Sv% = Save percentage; SO = Shutouts
Source: swehockey

== Goaltending leaders ==
Pos	Player	Country	TOI	GA	GAA	Sv%	SO
1	Iiro Tarkki	Finland	125:40	5	2.37	90.20	0
2	Stefan Liv	Sweden	127:12	7	3.30	88.71	0
3	Marek Schwarz	Czech Republic	126:41	5	2.37	88.10	0

TOI = Time on ice (minutes:seconds); SA = Shots against; GA = Goals against; GAA = Goals Against Average; Sv% = Save percentage; SO = Shutouts
Source: swehockey

== Tournament awards ==
Best players selected by the directorate:

- Best Goaltender: (Finland) Iiro Tarkki
- Best Defenceman: (Czech Republic) Miroslav Blaťák
- Best Forward: (Sweden) Mattias Weinhandl
