= 2008 Channel One Cup =

Tournament details
- Host countries: Russia; Sweden
- Cities: Moscow; Malmö
- Venues: 2 (in 2 host cities)
- Dates: 18–21 December 2008
- Teams: 4

Final positions
- Champions: Russia (12th title)
- Runners-up: Finland
- Third place: Czech Republic
- Fourth place: Sweden

Tournament statistics
- Games played: 6
- Goals scored: 38 (6.33 per game)
- Attendance: 55,152 (9,192 per game)
- Scoring leader: (Russia) Danis Zaripov (4 points)

Awards
- MVP: (Russia) Danis Zaripov

The 2008 Channel One Cup was played between 18 and 21 December 2008. The Czech Republic, Finland, Sweden and Russia played a round-robin for a total of three games per team and six games in total. Five of the matches were played in the Khodynka Arena in Moscow, Russia, and one match in Hyllie Arena in Malmö, Sweden. Russia won the tournament. The tournament was a part of the 2008–09 Euro Hockey Tour.

== Standings ==
Pos	Team	Pld	W	OTW	OTL	L	GF	GA	GD	Pts
1	Russia	3	3	0	0	0	15	5	+10	9
2	Finland	3	1	1	0	1	8	7	+1	5
3	Czech Republic	3	1	0	0	2	10	12	−2	3
4	Sweden	3	0	0	1	2	5	14	−9	1

Source: eurohockey

== Games ==
All times are local. Moscow – (Moscow Time – UTC+3) Prague – (Central European Time – UTC+1)

18 December 2008; 19:30	Sweden	2-6 (0-1, 0-4, 2-1)	Czech Republic	Hyllie Arena, Malmö; Attendance: 11,202

Game reference

Mattias Modig
Goalies
Miroslav Kopřiva
Referees:
(Czech Republic) Tom Laaksonen
(Czech Republic) Jari Levonen
Linesmen:
(Sweden) Christian Jönsson
(Sweden) Henrik Pihlblad

	0-1	01:26 – Rolinek (Marek)
	0-2	30:15 – Irgl
	0-3	37:47 – Kutlák (Vašíček) (PP)
	0-4	38:08 – Irgl (Rolinek)
	0-5	39:00 – Vašíček
Weinhandl (Mårtensson, Fernholm) (PP) – 43:05	1-5
Håkanson (Mårtensson, Weinhandl) (PP) – 43:43	2-5
	2-6	49:52 – Irgl (Marek, Kutlák) (PP)

12 min
Penalties
16 min
27
Shots
30

18 December 2008; 20:00	Finland	1-4 (1-0, 0-1, 0-3)	Russia	Khodynka Arena, Moscow; Attendance: 12,000

Game reference

Teemu Lassila
Goalies
Alexander Yeryomenko
Referees:
(Sweden) Sören Persson
(Sweden) Ulf Rönnmark
Linesmen:
(Russia) Viktor Birin
(Russia) Alexei Medvedev

Voutilainen (Seikola) (PP) – 15:18	1-0
	1-1	21:48 – Proshkin (Nikulin, Morozov) (PP)
	1-2	45:56 – Zaripov
	1-3	57:13 – Schastlivy (Mikhnov)
	1-4	59:21 – Zaripov (Proshkin)

18 min
Penalties
10 min
25
Shots
40

20 December 2008; 14:00	Russia	5-2 (2-0, 1-2, 2-0)	Czech Republic	Khodynka Arena, Moscow; Attendance: 12,000

Game reference

Konstantin Barulin
Goalies
Miroslav Kopřiva
Referees:
(Czech Republic) Stefan Persson
(Sweden) Ulf Rönnmark
Linesmen:
(Russia) Viktor Birin
(Russia) Alexei Medvedev

Sushinsky (Sergei Mozyakin) – 05:26	1-0
Zaripov (Tereshchenko) – 16:25	2-0
	2-1	27:56 – Klepiš (PS)
	2-2	29:38 – Marek (Rolinek) (PP)
Radulov (Saprykin) – 33:19	3-2
Saprykin (Gorovikov, Radulov) – 57:54	4-2
Kulyash (Yashin, Vishnevskiy) – 59:21	5-2

51 min
Penalties
34 min
32
Shots
16

20 December 2008; 18:00	Sweden	1-2 GWS (1-1, 0-0, 0-0) (OT: 0–0) (SO: 0–1)	Finland	Khodynka Arena, Moscow; Attendance: 3,350

Game reference
Johan Backlund	Goalies	Iiro Tarkki	Referees: (Russia) Vyacheslav Bulanov (Russia) Sergei Kulakov
Hannula (Åkerman, Berglund) – 12:47 / 1-0; / 1-1 / 14:37 – Sahlstedt (Koivisto, Aalto)			Referees: (Russia) Vyacheslav Bulanov (Russia) Sergei Kulakov
	Shootout	Kuhta	Referees: (Russia) Vyacheslav Bulanov (Russia) Sergei Kulakov
16 min	Penalties	14 min	Referees: (Russia) Vyacheslav Bulanov (Russia) Sergei Kulakov
19	Shots	27	Referees: (Russia) Vyacheslav Bulanov (Russia) Sergei Kulakov

21 December 2008; 14:00	Russia	6-2 (1-0, 2-0, 3-2)	Sweden	Khodynka Arena, Moscow; Attendance: 12,200

Game reference

Alexander Yeryomenko
Goalies
Johan Backlund
Referees:
(Russia) Vyacheslav Bulanov
(Russia) Sergei Kulakov

Mikhnov (SHG) – 17:21	1-0
Tereshchenko (Morozov, Proshkin) (PP) – 30:09	2-0
Atyushov (Mozyakin, Zinovjev) (PP) – 39:07	3-0
Zaripov (Nikulin, Morozov) (PP) – 40:28	4-0
Mozyakin (Sushinsky) – 41:42	5-0
	5-1	49:54 – Ericsson (Åkerman, Fransson)
Kulyash (Schastlivy, Mikhnov) (SHG)– 52:44	6-1
	6-2	54:14 – Ericsson (Omkark, Harju) (PP)

14 min
Penalties
20 min
42
Shots
26

21 December 2008; 18:00	Czech Republic	2-5 (0-1, 2-2, 0-2)	Finland	Khodynka Arena, Moscow; Attendance: 4,400

Game reference

Alexander Salák
Goalies
Teemu Lassila
Referees:
(Russia) Vyacheslav Bulanov
(Russia) Sergei Kulakov

	0-1	08:48 – Niskala (Voutilainen, Seikola) (PP)
	0-2	22:17 – Niskala (Aalto, Kuusela) (PP)
Hlinka (Klepiš) (PP) – 25:53	1-2
Rolinek (Blaťák) (PP) – 33:16	2-2
	2-3	38:14 – Seikola (Laine, Voutilainen)
	2-4	46:58 – Sahlstedt (Mäntylä, Kuusela) (PP)
	2-5	54:18 – Voutilainen (Koskenkorva, Seikola)

30 min
Penalties
22 min
28
Shots
24

== Scoring leaders ==
Pos	Player	Country	GP7	G	A	Pts	+/−	PIM	POS
1	Danis Zaripov	Russia	3	4	0	4	+3	0	LW
2	Tomáš Rolinek	Czech Republic	3	2	2	4	+3	0	CE
3	Jukka Voutilainen	Finland	3	2	2	4	+2	2	LW
4	Markus Seikola	Finland	3	1	3	4	+2	0	RD
5	Zbyněk Irgl	Czech Republic	3	3	0	3	+3	10	RW

TOI = Time on ice (minutes:seconds); SA = Shots against; GA = Goals against; GAA = Goals Against Average; Sv% = Save percentage; SO = Shutouts
Source: swehockey

== Goaltending leaders ==
Pos	Player	Country	TOI	GA	GAA	Sv%	SO
1	Alexander Yeryomenko	Russia	120:00	3	1.50	94.12	0
2	Teemu Lassila	Finland	120:0	6	3.00	91.18	0
3	Johan Backlund	Sweden	145:01	9	3.72	88.75	0
4	Miroslav Kopřiva	Czech Republic	120:00	7	3.50	88.14	0

TOI = Time on ice (minutes:seconds); SA = Shots against; GA = Goals against; GAA = Goals Against Average; Sv% = Save percentage; SO = Shutouts
Source: swehockey

== Tournament awards ==
Best players selected by the directorate:

- Best goalkeeper: (Finland) Teemu Lassila
- Best defenceman: (Czech Republic) Petr Čáslava
- Best forward: (Russia) Maxim Sushinsky
- Most Valuable Player: (Russia) Danis Zaripov

Media All-Star Team:

- Goaltender: (Russia) Alexander Yeryomenko
- Defence: (Russia) Vitali Proshkin, (Russia) Denis Kulyash
- Forwards: (Russia) Danis Zaripov, (Czech Republic) Jan Marek, (Czech Republic) Zbyněk Irgl
