= 2009 Gagarin Cup Finals =

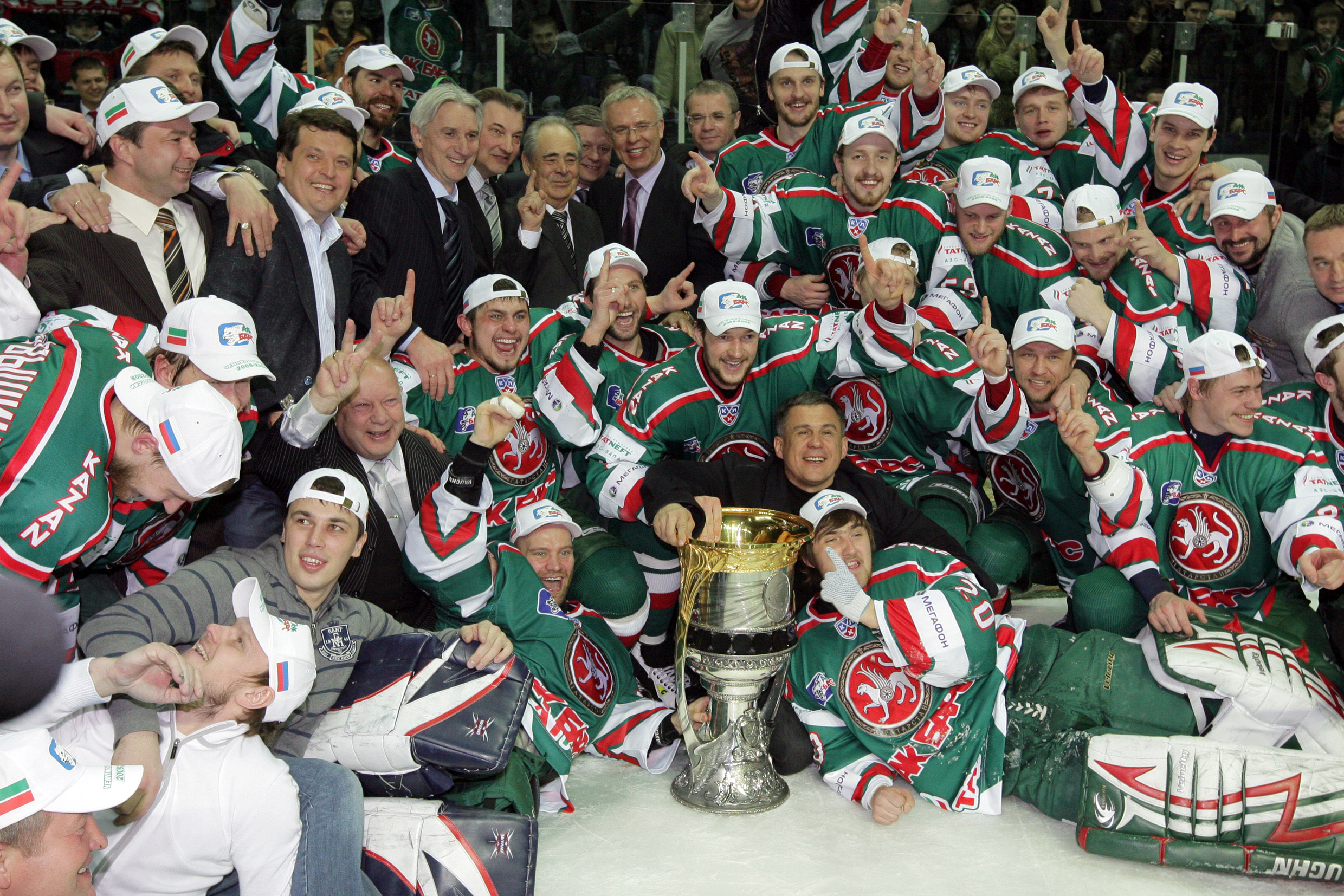
From right, back row, center : KHL President Alexander Medvedev, KHL chairman Vyacheslav Fetisov, Tatarstan President Mintimer Shaimiev, Vladislav Tretyak, president of the Russian Ice Hockey Federation, and HC Ak Bars Head Coach Zinetula Bilyaletdinov seen during the awards ceremony after the KHL final match between HC Lokomotiv Yaroslavl and HC Ak Bars in Kazan. Ak Bars beat Lokomotiv 1–0, winning the Gagarin Cup.

The 2009 Gagarin Cup Final was a best-of-seven playoff series that determined the Kontinental Hockey League (KHL) champion for the 2008–09 season. As a culmination of the 2009 Gagarin Cup playoffs, Ak Bars Kazan defeated Lokomotiv Yaroslavl, four games to three, and were awarded the Gagarin Cup.

== The series ==
=== Game one ===
April 2, 2009	Ak Bars Kazan	0:3 (0:0, 0:3, 0:0)	Lokomotiv Yaroslavl	TatNeft Arena, Kazan, Russia; Attendance: 8,240

Game reference
Stanislav Galimov	Goalies	Georgy Gelashvili
Goals / 28:13 – Zbynek Irgl; 31:53 – Konstantin Rudenko; 37:03 – Zbynek Irgl
12 min	Penalties	14 min
24	Shots	25

=== Game two ===
April 3, 2009	Ak Bars Kazan	4:3 OT (1:3, 2:0, 0:0, 1:0)	Lokomotiv Yaroslavl	TatNeft Arena, Kazan, Russia; Attendance: 7,882

Game reference
Stanislav Galimov	Goalies	Georgy Gelashvili
Tony Martensson – 16:33; Dmitri Obukhov – 49:43; Ilya Nikulin – 58:46; Andrei Pervyshin – 60:47 / Goals / 08:48 – Alexei Yashin; 09:02 – Nikita Klyukin; 13:13 – Sergei Konkov
10 min	Penalties	14 min
30	Shots	16

=== Game three ===
April 5, 2009	Lokomotiv Yaroslavl	3:0 (1:0, 2:0, 0:0)	Ak Bars Kazan	Arena 2000, Yaroslavl, Russia; Attendance: 9,046

Game reference
Georgy Gelashvili	Goalies	Fredrik Norrena
Marcus Nilson – 03:44; Zbynek Irgl – 32:32; Johan Akerman – 39:11 / Goals
45 min	Penalties	24 min
29	Shots	29

=== Game four ===
April 6, 2009	Lokomotiv Yaroslavl	2:5 (1:2, 1:3, 0:0)	Ak Bars Kazan	Arena 2000, Yaroslavl, Russia; Attendance: 9,046

Game reference
Georgy Gelashvili (00:00 – 40:00); Sergei Zvyagin (40:00 – 60:00)	Goalies	Fredrik Norrena
Johan Akerman – 17:41; Josef Vasicek – 28:38 / Goals / 02:42 – Alexei Morozov; 08:31 – Jukka Hentunen; 21:01 – Dmitri Obukhov; 21:28 – Jukka Hentunen; 34:56 – Tony Martensson
42 min	Penalties	32 min
28	Shots	22

=== Game five ===
April 8, 2009	Ak Bars Kazan	2:3 (1:0, 0:1, 1:2)	Lokomotiv Yaroslavl	TatNeft Arena, Kazan, Russia; Attendance: 8,295

Game reference
Fredrik Norrena	Goalies	Georgy Gelashvili
Danis Zaripov – 06:35; Dmitri Obukhov – 43:54 / Goals / 22:39 – Alexei Kudashov; 41:48 – Alexei Mikhnov; 46:57 – Josef Vasicek
0 min	Penalties	0 min
24	Shots	28

=== Game six ===
April 10, 2009	Lokomotiv Yaroslavl	2:3 OT (0:1, 0:0, 2:1, 0:1)	Ak Bars Kazan	Arena 2000, Yaroslavl, Russia; Attendance: 9,046

Game reference
Georgy Gelashvili	Goalies	Fredrik Norrena
Zbynek Irgl – 44:43; Alexei Mikhnov – 45:45 / Goals / 19:41 – Alexei Morozov; 48:02 – Danis Zaripov; 61:08 – Jukka Hentunen
6 min	Penalties	4 min
24	Shots	34

=== Game seven ===
April 12, 2009	Ak Bars Kazan	1:0 (0:0, 0:0, 1:0)	Lokomotiv Yaroslavl	TatNeft Arena, Kazan, Russia; Attendance: 8,294

Game reference
Fredrik Norrena	Goalies	Georgy Gelashvili
Alexei Morozov – 50:04 / Goals
22 min	Penalties	24 min
20	Shots	20
