= 2008 LG Hockey Games =

Tournament details
- Host countries: Sweden; Finland
- Cities: Stockholm; Tampere
- Venues: 2 (in 2 host cities)
- Dates: 7-10 February 2008
- Teams: 4

Final positions
- Champions: Russia (3rd title)
- Runners-up: Finland
- Third place: Sweden
- Fourth place: Czech Republic

Tournament statistics
- Games played: 6
- Goals scored: 34 (5.67 per game)
- Attendance: 50,325 (8,388 per game)
- Scoring leader: (Sweden) Mattias Weinhandl (4 points)

The 2008 LG Hockey Games was played between 7 and 10 February 2008 in Stockholm, Sweden. The Czech Republic, Finland, Sweden and Russia played a round-robin for a total of three games per team and six games in total. Five of the matches were played in the Stockholm Globe Arena in Stockholm, Sweden, and one match in the Tampere Ice Stadium in Tampere, Finland. The tournament was part of 2007–08 Euro Hockey Tour.

Sweden lost the final game, 1–2, against Finland despite Swedish goalkeeper Stefan Liv saving many shots.

== Standings ==
Pos	Team	Pld	W	OTW	SOW	OTL	SOL	L	GF	GA	GD	Pts
1	Russia	3	2	0	0	0	0	1	11	7	+4	6
2	Finland	3	2	0	0	0	0	1	8	7	+1	6
3	Sweden	3	1	0	0	0	0	2	8	8	0	3
4	Czech Republic	3	1	0	0	0	0	2	7	12	−5	3

Source: swehockey

== Games ==
All times are local. Stockholm – (Central European Time – UTC+1) Tampereen – (Eastern European Time – UTC+2)

7 February 2008; 18:15	Finland	6-1 (2-0, 3-0, 1-1)	Czech Republic	Tampere Ice Stadium in Tampere; Attendance: 7,800

Game reference

Sinuhe Wallinheimo
Goalies
Tomas Duba
Referee:
(Russia) Alexey Ravodin
Linesmen:
(Finland) Stefan Fonselius
(Finland) Antti Orelma

04:17 – Tomi Kallio (Tony Salmelainen) (PP)	1-0
19:58 – Mikko Lehtonen (Janne Pesonen) (PP)	2-0
23:20 – Hannes Hyvönen (Janne Pesonen, Esa Pirnes)	3-0
25:51 – Esa Pirnes (Tomi Kallio, Pasi Puistola) (PP)	4-0
00:00 – Tony Salmelainen (Esa Pirnes, Tomi Kallio) (PP)	5-0
	5-1	44:03 – Pavel Kasparik (Josef Melichar) (PP)
59:56 – Tuomas Pihlman (Raimo Helminen)	6-1

10 min
Penalties
14 min
35
Shots
24

7 February 2008; 19:00	Russia	4-3 (1-0, 1-1, 2-2)	Sweden	Stockholm Globe Arena, Stockholm; Attendance: 10,340

Game reference

Alexander Yeryomenko
Goalies
Daniel Larsson (ice hockey)
Referee:
(Finland) Aleksi Rantala
Linesmen:
(Sweden) Fredrik Carlman
(Sweden) Peter Sabelström

16:57 – Sergei Mozyakin (Maxim Sushinsky, Andrei Kuteikin)	1-0
	1-1	21:31 – Tony Mårtensson (Jonas Junland, Mattias Weinhandl)
32:17 – Nikolai Kulyomin (Alexei Mikhnov, Petr Schastlivy)	2-1
45:01 – Sergei Mozyakin (Maxim Sushinsky, Anton Kuryanov)	3-1
	3-2	46:15 – Patric Hörnqvist (Andreas Johansson, Nils Ekman)
	3-3	46:39 – Mattias Weinhandl (Linus Videll, Jonas Junland)
51:40 – Denis Platonov (Alexei Mikhnov)	4-3

16 min
Penalties
10 min
32
Shots
48

9 February 2008; 12:00	Finland	0-5 (0-0, 0-2, 0-3)	Russia	Stockholm Globe Arena, Stockholm; Attendance: 6,723

Game reference

Antti Niemi
Goalies
Semyon Varlamov
Referee:
(Sweden) Thomas Andersson
Linesmen:
(Sweden) Christian Jönsson
(Sweden) Fredrik Ulriksson

0-1	23:41 – Nikolai Kulyomin (Petr Schastlivy, Vitaly Atyushov)
0-2	33:03 – Maxim Sushinsky (Andrei Kuteikin, Petr Schastlivy)
0-3	41:16 – Oleg Saprykin (Konstantin Korneyev, Denis Platonov)
0-4	54:46 – Ilja Nikulin (Andrei Nikolishin)
0-5	56:12 – Maxim Sushinsky (Ilja Nikulin, Anton Kuryanov)

14 min
Penalties
36 min
41
Shots
20

9 February 2008; 15:30	Sweden	4-2 (0-1, 1-1, 3-0)	Czech Republic	Stockholm Globe Arena, Stockholm; Attendance: 10,532

Game reference

Daniel Larsson
Goalies
Milan Hnilicka
Referee:
(Finland) Aleksi Rantala
Linesmen:
(Sweden) Peter Sabelström
(Sweden) Daniel Winge

	0-1	08:59 – Jan Marek (Tomas Rolinek, Tomas Kurka)
33:05 – Kenny Jönsson (Nils Ekman, Patric Hörnqvist)	1-1
	1-2	35:19 – Tomas Rolinek (Radek Hamr, Tomas Zizka)
44:56 – Mattias Weinhandl (Johan Åkerman, Tony Mårtensson)	2-2
48:59 – Per Ledin (Tony Mårtensson, Daniel Widing)	3-2
59:01 – Mattias Weinhandl (Daniel Fernholm, Fredrik Warg)	4-2

10 min
Penalties
18 min
26
Shots
23

10 February 2008; 12:00	Czech Republic	4-2 (0-1, 4-1, 0-0)	Russia	Stockholm Globe Arena, Stockholm; Attendance: 1,080

Game reference

Milan Hnilicka
Goalies
Alexander Yeryomenko
Referee:
(Sweden) Morgan Johansson
Linesmen:
(Sweden) Christian Jönsson
(Sweden) Daniel Winge

	0-1	18:34 – Fedor Fedorov (Danny Markov, Alexei Tereshchenko)
23:08 – Petr Kumstat	1-1
24:34 – Pavel Kasparik (Tomas Netik, Tomas Kurka)	2-1
27:30 – Tomas Netik (Frantisek Lukes)	3-1
35:38 – Jakub Klepis (Frantisek Lukes)	4-1
	4-2	37:21 – Ilja Nikulin (Andrei Nikolishin)

8 min
Penalties
6 min
22
Shots
20

10 February 2008; 15:30	Sweden	1-2 (1-1, 0-1, 0-0)	Finland	Stockholm Globe Arena, Stockholm; Attendance: 13,850

Game reference

Stefan Liv
Goalies
Antti Niemi
Referee:
(Russia) Vladimir Sindler
Linesmen:
(Sweden) Fredrik Fredrik
(Sweden) Leo Takula

11:23 – Per Ledin (Daniel Widing)	1-0
	1-1	14:49 – Pasi Puistola (Mikko Luoma, Esa Pirnes) (PP)
	1-2	32:42 – Janne Pesonen (Hannes Hyvönen, Anssi Salmela) (PP)

24 min
Penalties
28 min
27
Shots
33

== Scoring leaders ==
Pos	Player	Country	GP	G	A	Pts	+/−	PIM	POS
1	Mattias Weinhandl	Sweden	3	3	1	4	+2	2	CE
2	Maxim Sushinsky	Russia	2	2	2	4	+2	0	RW
3	Esa Pirnes	Finland	3	1	3	4	+1	2	CE
4	Ilya Nikulin	Russia	3	2	1	3	+3	6	LD
5	Tony Mårtensson	Sweden	3	1	2	3	+2	0	RW

GP = Games played; G = Goals; A = Assists; Pts = Points; +/− = Plus/minus; PIM = Penalties in minutes; POS = Position
Source: swehockey

== Goaltending leaders ==
Pos	Player	Country	TOI	GA	GAA	Sv%	SO
1	Semyon Varlamov	Russia	80:00	0	0.00	100.00	1
2	Alexander Yeryomenko	Russia	100:00	7	4.20	89.55	0
3	Antti Niemi	Finland	117:23	5	2.56	89.13	0
4	Daniel Larsson	Sweden	118:58	6	3.03	89.09	0
5	Milan Hnilička	Czech Republic	124:46	8	3.11	87.69	0

TOI = Time on ice (minutes:seconds); SA = Shots against; GA = Goals against; GAA = Goals Against Average; Sv% = Save percentage; SO = Shutouts
Source: swehockey

== Tournament awards ==
The tournament directorate nominated the following players:

- Best goaltender: (Russia) Semyon Varlamov
- Best defenceman: (Sweden) Kenny Jönsson
- Best forward: (Russia) Maxim Sushinski

Media All-Star Team:

- Goaltender: (Russia) Semyon Varlamov
- Defence: (Russia) Ilya Nikulin, (Sweden) Kenny Jönsson
- Forwards: (Russia) Maxim Sushinski, (Sweden) Tony Mårtensson, (Sweden) Mattias Weinhandl
