= 2009 Kontinental Hockey League All-Star Game =

2009 KHL All-Star Game
	1	2	3	Total
Team Jagr	2	2	3	7
Team Yashin	1	3	2	6
- Date: January 10, 2009
- Venue: Red Square
- City: Moscow, Russia
- MVP: TBD
- Attendance: 4,000 Estimated

The 2009 Kontinental Hockey League All-Star Game was the All-Star game for the inaugural 2008–09 Kontinental Hockey League (KHL) season. It took place on January 10, 2009, at Red Square in Moscow, Russia. The World team won 7–6 over the Russian team.

== Nominations ==
Each team consisted of 9 forwards, 6 defensemen, and 2 goaltenders. The starting rosters were voted upon on the KHL.ru website. Both team captains were entitled to opt in 2 alternate captains of their choosing. The secondary lines and goaltenders were voted upon by the media and announced December 26, 2008, with the remaining players and reserves announced by January 8.

== Events ==
=== Game ===
The format for the game was "Team Yashin" (Russia) vs. "Team Jágr" (World). The teams were named after players who are highly recognized in the sport and synonymous with their respective countries. Both players also captained their teams for the event. The format was voted on by the fans, with the alternative being the standard interconference matchup. This is reminiscent of the format introduced for the 48th NHL All-Star Game and will be used as a device to promote the game outside of Russia, as well as to promote the diversity of the league itself.

=== Skills Competition ===
- The Fastest Skater
- Shootout Skill
- Long Range Shot
- Zigzag Team Relay
- Goalie Competition
- Accurate Shooting
- Speed Relay

== Rosters ==
	Team Jágr (World)	Team Yashin (Russia)
Coach:	(United States) Barry Smith (SKA Saint Petersburg)	Sergei Mikhalev (Salavat Yulaev Ufa)
Assistant Coaches:	(Finland) Kari Heikkilä (Lokomotiv Yaroslavl) (Czech Republic) Vladimír Vůjtek (Dynamo Moscow)	Vyacheslav Bykov (CSKA Moscow); Igor Zakharkin (CSKA Moscow)
Starters:	(Czech Republic) 15 - F Jan Marek (Metallurg Magnitogorsk) (Sweden) 86 - F Tony Mårtensson (Ak Bars Kazan) (Czech Republic) 28 - F Pavel Brendl (Torpedo Nizhny Novgorod) (Canada) 35 - D Kevin Dallman (Barys Astana) (Canada) 05 - D Ray Giroux (SKA Saint Petersburg) (United States) 31 - G Robert Esche (SKA Saint Petersburg)	33 - F Maxim Sushinsky (SKA Saint Petersburg); 25 - F Danis Zaripov (Ak Bars Kazan) (Moscow) 95 - F Aleksey Morozov (Ak Bars Kazan) (Moscow Oblast) 34 - D Vitali Proshkin (Salavat Yulaev Ufa) (Moscow) 05 - D Ilya Nikulin (Ak Bars Kazan) (Moscow) 30 - G Alexander Eremenko (Salavat Yulaev Ufa)
Reserves:	(Czech Republic) 98 - F Jaromír Jágr (Avangard Omsk) (C) (Slovakia) 81 - F Marcel Hossa (Dinamo Riga) (A) (Czech Republic) 20 - F Jakub Klepiš (Avangard Omsk) (A) (Slovakia) 92 - F Branko Radivojević (Spartak Moscow) (Finland) 12 - F Esa Pirnes (Atlant Moscow) (Czech Republic) 21 - F Jaroslav Kudrna (Metallurg Magnitogorsk) (Belarus) ## - F Oleg Antonenko (HC MVD) (Sweden) 06 - D Magnus Johansson (Atlant Moscow) (Czech Republic) 04 - D Karel Rachunek (Dynamo Moscow) (United States) ## - D Ben Clymer (Dinamo Minsk) (Canada) 01 - G Ray Emery (Atlant Moscow)	19 - F Alexei Yashin (Lokomotiv Yaroslavl) (C) (Komi Republic) ## - F Andrei Nikolishin (Traktor Chelyabinsk) (A); 32 - F Alexei Kudashov (Lokomotiv Yaroslavl) (A); 10 - F Sergei Mozyakin (Atlant Moscow); 27 - F Alexei Tereschenko (Salavat Yulaev Ufa); 47 - F Alexander Radulov (Salavat Yulaev Ufa) ## - F Oleg Saprykin (CSKA Moscow); 22 - D Konstantin Korneyev (CSKA Moscow) (Ukraine) 77 - D Alexei Zhitnik (Dynamo Moscow) (Lithuania) ## - D Darius Kasparaitis (SKA Saint Petersburg); 84 - G Konstantin Barulin (CSKA Moscow)

*International player's flags indicate nation of origin whereas Russian born player's flags indicate the Federal subject of origin

== See also ==
- 2008–09 KHL season
- Kontinental Hockey League All-Star Game
