= 2008–09 KHL season =

- League: Kontinental Hockey League
- Sport: Ice hockey
- Duration: September 2, 2008 – April 12, 2009
- Teams: 24

Regular season
- Regular-season winner: (Russia) Salavat Yulaev Ufa
- Season MVP: (Russia) Danis Zaripov; Ak Bars Kazan
- Top scorer: (Russia) Sergei Mozyakin; Atlant Moscow Oblast

Playoffs
- Playoffs MVP: (Russia) Alexei Morozov; Ak Bars Kazan

Gagarin Cup
- Champions: (Russia) Ak Bars Kazan
- Runners-up: (Russia) Lokomotiv Yaroslavl

KHL seasons
- ← 2007–08 2009–10 →

The 2008–09 KHL season was the inaugural season of the Kontinental Hockey League. It started on September 2, 2008, and finished on April 12, 2009. 24 teams each played 56 games.

== League business ==
=== NHL player transfer ===
KHL teams signed several players from the NHL, including Jaromír Jágr, Alexander Radulov, Ray Emery, Sergei Brylin, Ladislav Nagy, Jozef Stümpel, Marcel Hossa, Ben Clymer, Alexei Zhitnik, Bryan Berard and Chris Simon.

==== Dispute ====
A dispute between the two leagues over some of these signings was supposed to have been resolved by an agreement signed on July 10, whereby each league would honor the contracts of the other, but the signing of Alexander Radulov was made public one day after the agreement (though it was actually signed two days prior to the agreement taking effect), leading to an investigation by the International Ice Hockey Federation.

=== Finances ===
==== Ownership ====
On a deal dated October 30, Magnitogorsk Iron and Steel Works bought 11.76% of the KHL.

==== Salary cap ====
The league has implemented a salary cap.

==== Economic trouble ====
Metallurg Novokuznetsk experienced difficulty financing its operations due to the Great Recession. Team sponsor Evraz Group was rumoured to cut funding.

HC MVD experienced delays in paying players, while Khimik Voskresensk has run itself into debt. Metallurg Magnitogorsk has been forced to cut staff expenditures by 30%. Avangard Omsk owner Roman Abramovich has promised to continue financial support so long as the team maintains good results. Other teams experiencing financial limitations are Vityaz Chekhov, Atlant Moscow Oblast, Lokomotiv Yaroslavl, HC CSKA Moscow.

As far as the league is concerned it has devised a "crisis package" for dealing with the economic turmoil. Cuts will be made to non-salary expenditures, such as pre-game activity, training camps, and elimination of pre-season tournaments. Mid-level player salaries may also be rolled back. Divisional re-alignment will also take place for the 2009–10 season to cut down on travel costs.

=== Inaugural All-Star Game ===
The inaugural KHL All-Star Game took place on January 10, 2009. Each team consisted of ten forwards, five defensemen, and two goaltenders. The starting rosters were voted upon on the KHL.ru website and decided by December 22. The secondary lines and goaltenders were to be voted upon by the media, and announced December 26, with the following players and reserves announced by January 8. The game took place in Moscow's Red Square, with Team Jágr (International All-Stars) defeating Team Yashin (Russian All-Stars) 7–6.

== Regular season ==
=== Death of Alexei Cherepanov ===
On October 13, 2008 during a match between Avangard Omsk and Vityaz Chekhov, forward Alexei Cherepanov died due to a heart condition.

On December 29, 2008, Russian investigators revealed that he suffered from myocarditis, a condition where not enough blood gets to the heart, and that he should not have been playing professional hockey. The federal Investigative Committee also announced that a chemical analysis of Cherepanov's blood and urine samples allowed experts to conclude "that for several months Alexei Cherepanov engaged in doping". Official sources have stated the banned substance taken was nikethamide, a stimulant, and that it had been taken 3 hours prior to the game in which he died.

Omsk club director Mikhail Denisov has since been fired, whereas the league Disciplinary Committee has since removed Omsk's doctors from that role with the club, and has suspended Avangard general manager Anatoly Bardin and team president Konstantin Potapov. The KHL Disciplinary Committee met on this matter on January 5, and also suspended Chekhov's team president.

=== League standings ===
Final standings.

Points have been awarded as follows:

- 3 Points for a win in regulation ("W")
- 2 Points for a win in overtime ("OTW") or penalty shootout ("SOW")
- 1 Point for a loss in a penalty shootout ("SOL") or overtime ("OTL")
- 0 Points for a loss in regulation ("L")

Division winner
Qualified for playoffs

Rank	Team	GP	W	OTW	SOW	SOL	OTL	L	GF	GA	Pts
1	(Russia) Salavat Yulaev Ufa	56	38	4	1	3	2	8	203	116	129
2	(Russia) Ak Bars Kazan	56	36	1	3	3	3	10	189	123	122
3	(Russia) Lokomotiv Yaroslavl	56	32	2	2	4	3	13	175	111	111
4	(Russia) CSKA Moscow	56	27	4	3	7	4	11	176	141	106
5	(Russia) Atlant Moscow Oblast	56	35	3	4	2	1	11	189	111	122
6	(Russia) Metallurg Magnitogorsk	56	25	2	11	2	1	15	174	148	104
7	(Russia) Dynamo Moscow	56	27	4	3	3	2	17	184	143	100
8	(Russia) SKA Saint Petersburg	56	26	2	7	4	0	17	143	105	100
9	(Russia) Spartak Moscow	56	26	1	5	2	1	21	173	158	93
10	(Latvia) Dinamo Riga	56	24	3	2	3	1	23	132	156	86
11	(Russia) Torpedo Nizhny Novgorod	56	24	2	2	3	1	24	162	162	84
12	(Russia) Traktor Chelyabinsk	56	24	0	2	5	3	22	142	166	84
13	(Russia) Lada Togliatti	56	21	3	5	2	3	22	120	116	84
14	(Russia) Neftekhimik Nizhnekamsk	56	22	2	1	5	2	24	146	140	79
15	(Kazakhstan) Barys Astana	56	20	3	4	2	2	25	174	191	78
16	(Russia) Avangard Omsk	56	19	2	6	1	4	24	161	164	78
17	(Russia) Severstal Cherepovets	56	19	1	7	2	2	25	142	171	77
18	(Russia) HC MVD	56	20	2	4	1	0	29	142	159	73
19	(Russia) Sibir Novosibirsk	56	15	1	5	2	5	28	146	172	64
20	(Russia) Amur Khabarovsk	56	15	2	2	6	1	30	111	158	60
21	(Russia) Metallurg Novokuznetsk	56	12	3	2	5	2	31	127	157	54
22	(Belarus) Dinamo Minsk	56	12	1	2	5	2	34	124	197	49
23	(Russia) Vityaz Chekhov	56	6	2	3	7	5	33	134	225	40
24	(Russia) Khimik Voskresensk	56	8	3	0	7	2	36	108	187	39

=== Divisional standing ===
DR	LR	Bobrov Division	GP	W	OTW	SOW	SOL	OTL	L	GF	GA	Pts
1	1	(Russia) Salavat Yulaev Ufa	56	38	4	1	3	2	8	203	116	129
2	5	(Russia) Atlant Moscow Oblast	56	35	3	4	2	1	11	189	111	122
3	9	(Russia) Spartak Moscow	56	26	1	5	2	1	21	173	158	93
4	17	(Russia) Severstal Cherepovets	56	19	1	7	2	2	25	142	171	77
5	21	(Russia) Metallurg Novokuznetsk	56	12	3	2	5	2	31	127	157	54
6	22	(Belarus) Dinamo Minsk	56	12	1	2	5	2	34	124	197	49

DR	LR	Tarasov Division	GP	W	OTW	SOW	SOL	OTL	L	GF	GA	Pts
1	4	(Russia) CSKA Moscow	56	27	4	3	7	4	11	176	141	106
2	6	(Russia) Metallurg Magnitogorsk	56	25	2	11	2	1	15	174	148	104
3	8	(Russia) SKA Saint Petersburg	56	26	2	7	4	0	17	143	105	100
4	12	(Russia) Traktor Chelyabinsk	56	24	0	2	5	3	22	142	166	84
5	18	(Russia) HC MVD	56	20	2	4	1	0	29	142	159	73
6	24	(Russia) Khimik Voskresensk	56	8	3	0	7	2	36	108	187	39

DR	LR	Kharlamov Division	GP	W	OTW	SOW	SOL	OTL	L	GF	GA	Pts
1	3	(Russia) Lokomotiv Yaroslavl	56	32	2	2	4	3	13	175	111	111
2	10	(Latvia) Dinamo Riga	56	24	3	2	3	1	23	132	156	86
3	13	(Russia) Lada Togliatti	56	21	3	5	2	3	22	120	116	84
4	16	(Russia) Avangard Omsk	56	19	2	6	1	4	24	161	164	78
5	19	(Russia) Sibir Novosibirsk	56	15	1	5	2	5	28	146	172	64
6	20	(Russia) Amur Khabarovsk	56	15	2	2	6	1	30	11	158	60

DR	LR	Chernyshev Division	GP	W	OTW	SOW	SOL	OTL	L	GF	GA	Pts
1	2	(Russia) Ak Bars Kazan	56	36	1	3	3	3	10	189	123	122
2	7	(Russia) Dynamo Moscow	56	27	4	3	3	2	17	184	143	100
3	11	(Russia) Torpedo Nizhny Novgorod	56	24	2	2	3	1	24	162	162	84
4	14	(Russia) Neftekhimik Nizhnekamsk	56	22	2	1	5	2	24	146	140	79
5	15	(Kazakhstan) Barys Astana	56	20	3	4	2	2	25	174	191	78
6	23	(Russia) Vityaz Chekhov	56	6	2	3	7	5	33	134	225	40

=== League leaders ===
Goals	(Czech Republic) Jan Marek (Magnitogorsk)	35
Assists	(Russia) Sergei Mozyakin (Atlant)	42
Points	(Russia) Sergei Mozyakin (Atlant)	76
Shots	(Canada) Kevin Dallman (Astana)	218
Plus–minus	(Russia) Alexei Tereschenko (Ufa)	+41
Penalty minutes	(Canada) Chris Simon (Chekhov)	263
Wins (Goaltenders)	(Russia) Georgi Gelashvili (Yaroslavl)	30
Goals against average	(Russia) Dmitri Yachanov (SKA)	1.47
Save percentage	(Kazakhstan) Vitaly Kolesnik (Atlant)	.945

Goaltenders: minimum 15 games played

=== Scoring leaders ===
GP = Games played; G = Goals; A = Assists; Pts = Points; +/– = P Plus–minus; PIM = Penalty minutes

Player	Team	GP	G	A	Pts	+/–	PIM
(Russia) Sergei Mozyakin	Atlant Moscow Oblast	56	34	42	76	+34	14
(Czech Republic) Jan Marek	Metallurg Magnitogorsk	53	35	37	72	+26	62
(Russia) Aleksey Morozov	Ak Bars Kazan	49	32	39	71	+22	22
(Russia) Danis Zaripov	Ak Bars Kazan	56	34	31	65	+26	26
(Canada) Kevin Dallman	Barys Astana	53	28	30	58	+6	137
(Russia) Alexei Tereschenko	Salavat Yulaev Ufa	55	28	30	58	+41	22
(Czech Republic) Jaromír Jágr	Avangard Omsk	55	25	28	53	−1	62
(Russia) Alexander Korolyuk	Atlant Moscow Oblast	56	21	32	53	+21	32
(Kazakhstan) Alexander Perezhogin	Salavat Yulaev Ufa	55	28	24	52	+34	32
(Russia) Konstantin Glazachev	Barys Astana	56	28	24	52	−7	30

== Playoffs ==
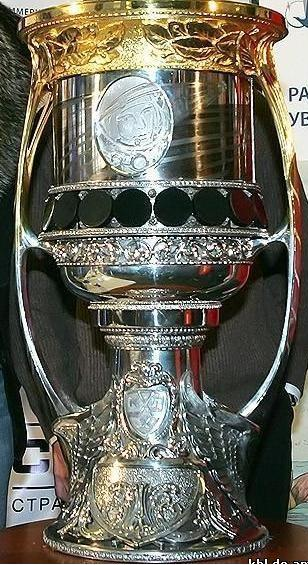
The Gagarin Cup

Preliminary Round (best of 5)
2	(Russia) Ak Bars	3
15	(Kazakhstan) Barys Astana	0
1	(Russia) Salavat Yulaev	1
16	(Russia) Avangard	3
4	(Russia) CSKA	3
13	(Russia) Lada	2
7	(Russia) Dynamo Msk	3
10	(Latvia) Dinamo Rg	0
3	(Russia) Lokomotiv	3
14	(Russia) Neftekhimik	1
8	(Russia) SKA	0
9	(Russia) Spartak	3
5	(Russia) Atlant	3
12	(Russia) Traktor	0
6	(Russia) Metallurg Mg	3
11	(Russia) Torpedo	0

Quarter-finals (best of 5)
2	(Russia) Ak Bars	3
16	(Russia) Avangard	2
4	(Russia) CSKA	0
7	(Russia) Dynamo Msk	3
3	(Russia) Lokomotiv	3
9	(Russia) Spartak	0
5	(Russia) Atlant	1
6	(Russia) Metallurg Mg	3

Semi-finals (best of 7)
2	(Russia) Ak Bars	4
7	(Russia) Dynamo Msk	2
3	(Russia) Lokomotiv	4
6	(Russia) Metallurg Mg	1

Gagarin Cup Finals (best of 7)
2	(Russia) Ak Bars	4
3	(Russia) Lokomotiv	3

=== Playoff leaders ===
Source: khl.ru

Goals	(Finland) Jukka Hentunen (Kazan)	9
Assists	(Russia) Alexei Morozov (Kazan) (Russia) Alexei Yashin (Yaroslavl)	11
Points	(Russia) Alexei Morozov (Kazan)	19
Shots	(Russia) Danis Zaripov (Kazan)	71
Plus–minus	(Russia) Ilya Nikulin (Kazan)	+13
Penalty minutes	(Russia) Grigori Panin (Kazan)	69
Wins (Goaltenders)	(Russia) Georgi Gelashvili (Yaroslavl)	13
Goals against average	(Kazakhstan) Vitali Yeremeyev (Dynamo M)	1.63
Save percentage	(Russia) Alexander Pimankin (Nizhny Novgorod)	94.4
Shutouts	(Russia) Georgi Gelashvili (Yaroslavl)	5

Goaltenders: minimum 5 games played

==== Scoring leaders ====
Source: khl.ru

GP = Games played; G = Goals; A = Assists; Pts = Points; +/– = P Plus–minus; PIM = Penalty minutes

Player	Team	GP	G	A	Pts	+/–	PIM
(Russia) Alexei Morozov	Ak Bars Kazan	21	8	11	19	+8	12
(Russia) Alexei Yashin	Lokomotiv Yaroslavl	19	7	11	18	+3	10
(Sweden) Tony Mårtensson	Ak Bars Kazan	21	7	9	16	+10	2
(Sweden) Mattias Weinhandl	Dynamo Moscow	12	6	10	16	+8	4
(Russia) Danis Zaripov	Ak Bars Kazan	21	6	10	16	+9	8

==== Leading goaltenders ====
Source: khl.ru

GP = Games played; Min = Minutes played; W = Wins; L = Losses; GA = Goals against; SO = Shutouts; SV% = Save percentage; GAA = Goals against average

Player	Team	GP	Min	W	L	GA	SO	SV%	GAA
(Kazakhstan) Vitali Yeremeyev	Dynamo Moscow	12	700:01	8	4	19	1	.927	1.63
(Russia) Stanislav Galimov	Ak Bars Kazan	7	396:05	3	2	11	1	.926	1.67
(Finland) Jussi Markkanen	CSKA Moscow	7	379:16	3	3	11	2	.934	1.74
(Russia) Georgi Gelashvili	Lokomotiv Yaroslavl	19	1,129:56	13	6	33	5	.933	1.75
(Canada) Ray Emery	Atlant Moscow Oblast	7	418:56	4	3	13	1	.941	1.86

== Awards ==
=== Players of the Month ===
Best KHL players of each month.

Month	Goaltender	Defense	Forward	Rookie
September	(Russia) Alexander Eremenko (Ufa)	(Sweden) Magnus Johansson (Atlant)	(Russia) Sergei Mozyakin (Atlant)	(Russia) Maxim Kitsyn (Novokuznetsk)
October	(Kazakhstan) Vitaly Kolesnik (Atlant)	(Russia) Ilya Nikulin (Kazan)	(Czech Republic) Jan Marek (Magnitogorsk)	(Russia) Andrei Kolesnikov (Chekhov)
November	(United States) Robert Esche (St. Petersburg)	(Russia) Konstantin Korneyev (CSKA)	(Russia) Alexei Tereshchenko (Ufa)	(Russia) Stanislav Galimov (Kazan)
December	(Czech Republic) Martin Prusek (Riga)	(Czech Republic) Karel Rachůnek (Dynamo M)	(Russia) Danis Zaripov (Kazan)	(Russia) Alexandr Vasiliev (Chekhov)
January	(Kazakhstan) Vitaliy Yeremeyev (Dynamo M)	(Russia) Vitali Proshkin (Ufa)	(Russia) Alexander Korolyuk (Atlant)	(Russia) Alexandr Vasiliev (Chekhov)
February	(Germany) Dimitrij Kotschnew (Spartak)	(Slovakia) Peter Podhradský (Torpedo)	(Russia) Danis Zaripov (Kazan)	(Russia) Stepan Zakharchuk (Togliatti)
March	(Russia) Georgi Gelashvili (Yaroslavl)	(Russia) Ilya Nikulin (Kazan)	(Sweden) Mattias Weinhandl (Dynamo M)	

=== KHL Awards ===
On 15 May 2009, the KHL held their first award ceremony. A total of 23 different awards were handed out to teams, players, officials and media. The most important trophies are listed in the table below.

Golden Hockey Stick Trophy (regular-season MVP)	(Russia) Danis Zaripov (Kazan)
Play-off Master Award (play-off MVP)	(Russia) Alexei Morozov (Kazan)
Alexei Cherepanov Award (best rookie)	(Russia) Ilya Proskuryakov (Magnitogorsk)
