= HC 19 Humenné =

- City: Humenné, Slovakia
- League: Slovak 1. Liga
- Founded: 2019
- Home arena: Humenné Ice Stadium (capacity: 3,150)
- Colours: Blue, yellow, white
- Head coach: Tibor Tartaľ
- Website: www.hc19humenne.sk

HC 19 Humenné is an ice hockey team playing in the Slovak 1. Liga, and formed in 2019. They play in the city of Humenné, Slovakia.

== History ==
HC 19 Humenné is a newly established club in the town of Humenné, which wants to build on the representation of the town of Humenné in senior hockey. After the announcement of the end of MHK Humenné, members of the new HC 19 Humenné club on behalf of MHK completed the previous 2018/2019 season, where they represented the city in St. Nicolaus I. Men's League. After an attempt to maintain the premier league license, with the promise of the president of SZĽH, HC 19 Humenné did not succeed in obtaining a license and the club had to start in the 2nd men's league. Club HC 19 Humenné is a civic association, and thus the primary goal of the project is to develop hockey in the city and support the meaningful use of free time. The secondary goal is to develop a hockey community. The chairman of the association is Peter Ždiňak, the vice-chairman is Mikuláš Koščo and the members are Tomáš Šudík and Peter Mižák.

== Honours ==
=== Domestic ===
Slovak 1. Liga

- (gold) Winners (1): 2022–23

== Players ==
=== Current roster ===
Source: eliteprospects.comAs of 1 August 2023.

No.	Nat	Player	Pos	S/G	Age	Acquired	Birthplace
–	(Slovakia)	Dominik Borov	C	L	26	2020	Humenné, Slovakia
44	(Russia)	Kirill Dyakov	D	L	32	2023	Nizhny Tagil, Russia
35	(Russia)	Stanislav Galimov	G	L	38	2023	Chelyabinsk, Russian SFSR
48	(Russia)	Ivan Glazkov	D	L	34	2023	Novosibirsk, Russia
81	(Slovakia)	Lukáš Handlovský (C)	LW	R	39	2023	Banská Bystrica, Czechoslovakia
–	(Slovakia)	Kristián Horvát	F	L	30	2020	Prešov, Slovakia
–	(Slovakia)	Matej Jacko	D	L	23	2022	Košice, Slovakia
31	(Slovakia)	Patrik Kozel	G	L	25	2023	Liptovský Mikuláš, Slovakia
–	(Slovakia)	Martin Krajňák	C	L	30	2020	Prešov, Slovakia
47	(Finland)	Hannu Kuru	C	L	33	2023	Kaarina, Finland
–	(Slovakia)	Lukáš Lačný	LW	L	25	2022	Vranov nad Topľou, Slovakia
–	(Slovakia)	Adam Lapšanský	LW	L	36	2023	Spišská Nová Ves, Czechoslovakia
93	(Slovakia)	Jakub Linet	C	L	35	2023	Žilina, Czechoslovakia
88	(Slovakia)	Jakub Meliško	D	L	29	2023	Žiar nad Hronom, Slovakia
21	(Slovakia)	Damián Novický	D	R	30	2022	Prešov, Slovakia
42	(Slovakia)	Miroslav Novota	D	L	24	2022	Košice, Slovakia
–	(Russia)	Denis Parshin	LW	L	40	2023	Rybinsk, USSR
72	(Russia)	Vadim Pereskokov	LW	L	32	2023	Uralsk, Kazakhstan
–	(Slovakia)	Jakub Ragan	LW	L	24	2022	Humenné, Slovakia
22	(Slovakia)	Dávid Šoltés	RW	R	31	2023	Košice, Slovakia
8	(Slovakia)	Ivan Thomka	C	L	22	2023	Martin, Slovakia
18	(Slovakia)	Filip Vaško	LW	L	32	2022	Humenné, Slovakia
–	(Slovakia)	Filip Vrábeľ	LW	L	29	2022	Košice, Slovakia
