= Dmitri Obukhov =

Russian ice hockey player (born 1983)

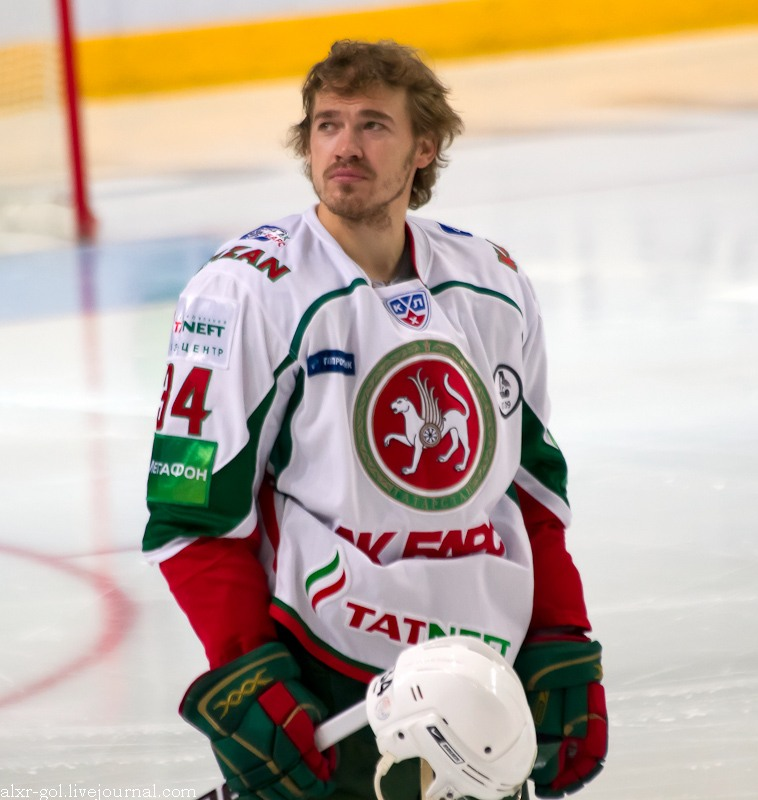
- Born: July 9, 1983 (age 43) Kazan, Russian SFSR, Soviet Union
- Height: 6 ft 0 in (183 cm)
- Weight: 205 lb (93 kg; 14 st 9 lb)
- Position: Forward
- Shoots: Left
- Slovak team Former teams: HK Dukla Trenčín; Spartak Moscow; Ak Bars Kazan; Neftekhimik Nizhnekamsk; Metallurg Magnitogorsk
- Playing career: 2004–present

Dmitri Alekseev Obukhov (Russian: Дми́трий Алексе́евич О́бухов; born July 9, 1983) is a Russian professional ice hockey winger who currently plays for HK Dukla Trenčín in the Slovak Extraliga (Slovak). He has formerly played in the Kontinental Hockey League (KHL), winning the Gagarin Cup twice with Ak Bars Kazan.

== Awards and honours ==
Award	Year
KHL
Gagarin Cup (Ak Bars Kazan)	2009, 2010, 2018
