= Andrei Kuteikin =

Russian ice hockey player

- Born: September 30, 1984 (age 42) Saratov, Russian SFSR, Soviet Union
- Height: 6 ft 2 in (188 cm)
- Weight: 218 lb (99 kg; 15 st 8 lb)
- Position: Defence
- Shot: Left
- Played for: Salavat Yulaev Ufa; SKA Saint Petersburg; Avangard Omsk; Dynamo Moscow; Spartak Moscow
- Playing career: 2003–2021

Andrei Kuteikin (born September 30, 1984) is a Russian former professional ice hockey defenceman who most recently played for HC Spartak Moscow of the Kontinental Hockey League (KHL).

Kuteikin made his Kontinental Hockey League debut playing with Salavat Yulaev Ufa during the inaugural 2008–09 KHL season.

== Career statistics ==
			Regular season					Playoffs
Season	Team	League	GP	G	A	Pts	PIM	GP	G	A	Pts	PIM
2000–01	Lokomotiv Yaroslavl-2	Russia3	28	2	3	5	36	—	—	—	—	—
2001–02	Avangard-VDV Omsk	Russia3	16	0	3	3	44	—	—	—	—	—
2001–02	Salavat Yulaev Ufa-2	Russia3	18	1	0	1	47	—	—	—	—	—
2002–03	Salavat Yulaev Ufa-2	Russia3	33	1	8	9	36	—	—	—	—	—
2003–04	Salavat Yulaev Ufa-2	Russia3	4	0	1	1	4	—	—	—	—	—
2003–04	Kristall Saratov	Russia2	47	0	3	3	59	4	0	0	0	6
2003–04	Kristall Saratov-2	Russia3	7	2	0	2	6	—	—	—	—	—
2004–05	Kristall Saratov	Russia2	30	2	6	8	40	—	—	—	—	—
2004–05	Salavat Yulaev Ufa	Russia	15	2	5	7	14	—	—	—	—	—
2004–05	Salavat Yulaev Ufa-2	Russia3	12	1	4	5	10	—	—	—	—	—
2005–06	Salavat Yulaev Ufa	Russia	49	9	13	22	72	6	1	4	5	10
2006–07	Salavat Yulaev Ufa	Russia	42	6	12	18	96	—	—	—	—	—
2007–08	Salavat Yulaev Ufa	Russia	50	8	10	18	38	15	1	6	7	61
2008–09	Salavat Yulaev Ufa	KHL	35	6	10	16	49	4	1	0	1	0
2009–10	Salavat Yulaev Ufa	KHL	24	2	7	9	16	5	0	1	1	6
2010–11	Salavat Yulaev Ufa	KHL	39	6	14	20	58	17	3	2	5	16
2011–12	Salavat Yulaev Ufa	KHL	33	1	9	10	26	—	—	—	—	—
2012–13	Salavat Yulaev Ufa	KHL	7	2	1	3	2	1	0	0	0	0
2013–14	SKA St. Petersburg	KHL	30	1	4	5	12	1	0	0	0	0
2014–15	SKA St. Petersburg	KHL	52	11	13	24	30	16	1	2	3	6
2015–16	SKA St. Petersburg	KHL	29	6	6	12	18	9	0	2	2	2
2016–17	Avangard Omsk	KHL	20	1	5	6	6	—	—	—	—	—
2016–17	HC Dynamo Moscow	KHL	22	4	5	9	14	10	3	1	4	27
2017–18	HC Dynamo Moscow	KHL	50	5	10	15	41	—	—	—	—	—
2017–18	Buran Voronezh	VHL	1	0	0	0	0	—	—	—	—	—
2018–19	HC Spartak Moscow	KHL	51	6	14	20	18	—	—	—	—	—
2019–20	HC Spartak Moscow	KHL	34	6	7	13	12	5	0	2	2	0
2020–21	HC Spartak Moscow	KHL	17	1	2	3	12	—	—	—	—	—
KHL totals			443	58	107	165	314	68	8	10	18	57
