= Stepan Zakharchuk =

Russian ice hockey player (born 1986)

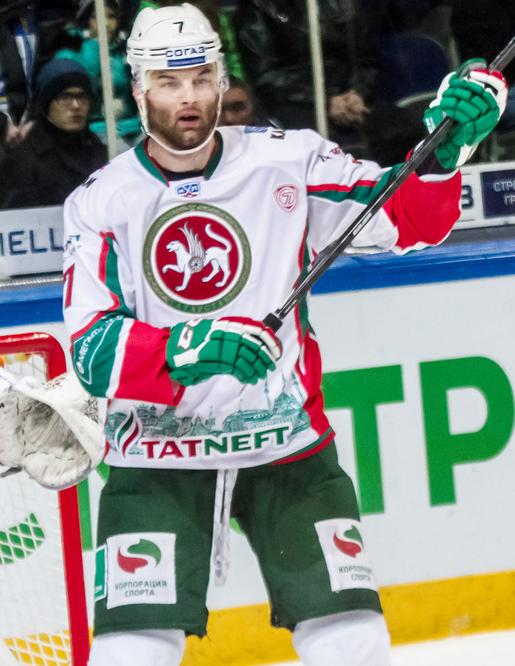
- Born: November 30, 1986 (age 39) Amderma, Russian SFSR
- Height: 6 ft 4 in (193 cm)
- Weight: 231 lb (105 kg; 16 st 7 lb)
- Position: Defence
- Shot: Left
- Played for: Lada Togliatti; Ak Bars Kazan; Torpedo Nizhny Novgorod; Admiral Vladivostok; Neftekhimik Nizhnekamsk; HC Dynamo Pardubice; Rytiri Kladno; Feniks Kazan
- Playing career: 2008–2023

Stepan Zakharchuk (born November 30, 1986) is a Russian professional ice hockey defenceman who currently plays for HC Dynamo Pardubice of the Czech Extraliga (ELH). He has formerly played most notably with HC Lada Togliatti and Ak Bars Kazan. He is known for his physical play and does not play a creative game and does not score many goals.

After starting the 2018–19 season with original club, HC CSK VVS Samara of the second tier Supreme Hockey League (VHL), Zakharchuk returned to the KHL in agreeing to a one-year contract with Admiral Vladivostok on October 4, 2018.

In the 2019–20 season, he captained HC Neftekhimik Nizhnekamsk, collecting 12 points in 41 games, before leaving mid-season to join Czech outfit HC Dynamo Pardubice of the ELH, on 25 January 2020.

His younger brother Ivan also played in the KHL (for HC Sochi, Severstal Cherepovets and alongside Stepan for a brief period at Torpedo Nizhny Novgorod.)

== Career statistics ==
			Regular season					Playoffs
Season	Team	League	GP	G	A	Pts	PIM	GP	G	A	Pts	PIM
2001–02	HC CSK VVS Samara-2	Russia3	1	0	0	0	2	—	—	—	—	—
2002–03	HC CSK VVS Samara-2	Russia3	13	1	0	1	6	—	—	—	—	—
2003–04	HC CSK VVS Samara-2	Russia3	60	5	1	6	104	—	—	—	—	—
2004–05	HC CSK VVS Samara	Russia2	3	0	0	0	0	—	—	—	—	—
2004–05	HC CSK VVS Samara-2	Russia3	68	10	13	23	238	—	—	—	—	—
2005–06	HC CSK VVS Samara	Russia2	53	1	5	6	150	—	—	—	—	—
2006–07	HC CSK VVS Samara	Russia2	44	3	12	15	121	3	1	1	2	8
2006–07	HC CSK VVS Samara-2	Russia3	9	2	2	4	28	—	—	—	—	—
2007–08	HC CSK VVS Samara	Russia2	59	5	14	19	125	—	—	—	—	—
2007–08	HC Lada Togliatti-2	Russia3	2	0	0	0	4	8	3	3	6	27
2008–09	HC Lada Togliatti	KHL	48	4	5	9	44	5	1	0	1	12
2008–09	HC Lada Togliatti-2	Russia3	4	3	0	3	6	3	0	0	0	51
2009–10	HC Lada Togliatti	KHL	12	0	0	0	41	—	—	—	—	—
2009–10	Ak Bars Kazan	KHL	18	0	2	2	16	14	1	1	2	14
2010–11	Ak Bars Kazan	KHL	25	0	3	3	24	5	0	1	1	6
2010–11	Neftyanik Almetyevsk	VHL	5	0	1	1	0	—	—	—	—	—
2011–12	Ak Bars Kazan	KHL	29	1	4	5	74	9	0	0	0	4
2012–13	Ak Bars Kazan	KHL	35	1	3	4	45	18	0	3	3	20
2013–14	Ak Bars Kazan	KHL	40	0	1	1	57	3	0	1	1	40
2014–15	Ak Bars Kazan	KHL	31	2	8	10	51	18	3	4	7	47
2014–15	Bars Kazan	VHL	3	0	2	2	0	—	—	—	—	—
2015–16	Ak Bars Kazan	KHL	50	4	7	11	40	7	0	2	2	8
2016–17	Ak Bars Kazan	KHL	53	4	13	17	38	15	0	3	3	30
2017–18	Ak Bars Kazan	KHL	11	0	2	2	31	—	—	—	—	—
2017–18	Torpedo Nizhny Novgorod	KHL	4	0	1	1	25	2	0	0	0	27
2018–19	HC CSK VVS Samara	VHL	6	2	1	3	4	—	—	—	—	—
2018–19	Admiral Vladivostok	KHL	27	3	2	5	31	—	—	—	—	—
2019–20	HC Neftekhimik Nizhnekamsk	KHL	41	4	8	12	18	—	—	—	—	—
2019–20	HC Dynamo Pardubice	Czech	12	1	5	6	22	—	—	—	—	—
2020–21	HC Dynamo Pardubice	Czech	5	0	0	0	4	—	—	—	—	—
2020–21	Rytiri Kladno	Czech2	20	3	3	6	18	16	1	4	5	10
2021–22	Neftyanik Almetyevsk	VHL	43	9	4	13	27	6	0	1	1	2
2022–23	Feniks Kazan	Russia3	15	3	2	5	16	—	—	—	—	—
KHL totals			424	23	59	82	535	96	5	15	20	208
Czech totals			17	1	5	6	26	—	—	—	—	—
VHL totals			57	11	8	19	31	6	0	1	1	2
Russia2 totals			159	9	31	40	396	3	1	1	2	8
