= Vadim Pereskokov =

Russian ice hockey player

- Born: 27 August 1993 (age 32) Uralsk, Kazakhstan
- Height: 5 ft 10 in (178 cm)
- Weight: 170 lb (77 kg; 12 st 2 lb)
- Position: Forward
- Shoots: Left
- Slovak team Former teams: HC 19 Humenné; CSKA Moscow; Kunlun Red Star; Lahti Pelicans; Admiral Vladivostok; Jukurit; Lausanne HC; Torpedo Nizhny Novgorod; HC Košice; Amur Khabarovsk; HK Dukla Michalovce
- Playing career: 2012–present

Vadim Pereskokov (born 27 August 1993) is a Russian professional ice hockey forward currently playing for HC 19 Humenné of the Slovak Extraliga.

== Playing career ==
He previously played with Admiral Vladivostok with whom he joined after a brief stint with Lahti Pelicans of the Finnish Liiga. He formerly played for HC Kunlun Red Star of the Kontinental Hockey League.

On July 5, 2018, Pereskokov was traded in the off-season by Admiral to HC Spartak Moscow in exchange for Ville Pokka.

== Career statistics ==
=== Regular season and playoffs ===
			Regular season					Playoffs
Season	Team	League	GP	G	A	Pts	PIM	GP	G	A	Pts	PIM
2021–22	HC Košice	Slovak	50	15	26	41	12	12	2	6	8	2
2022–23	Amur Khabarovsk	KHL	8	0	1	1	2	—	—	—	—	—
2022–23	HK Dukla Michalovce	Slovak	19	1	7	8	10	18	5	10	15	6
Liiga totals			116	33	33	66	69	—	—	—	—	—
