= Hannu Kuru =

Finnish ice hockey player

- Born: 12 May 1993 (age 33) Kaarina, Finland
- Height: 5 ft 12 in (183 cm)
- Weight: 194 lb (88 kg; 13 st 12 lb)
- Position: Forward
- Shoots: Left
- Slovak team Former teams: HC 19 Humenné; HC TPS; TUTO Hockey; Tappara; Espoo Blues; HK Spišská Nová Ves; MHk 32 Liptovský Mikuláš
- Playing career: 2012–present

Hannu Kuru (born 12 May 1993) is a Finnish ice hockey player who currently playing for HC 19 Humenné of the Slovak Extraliga.

Kuru made his SM-liiga debut playing with HC TPS during the 2012–13 SM-liiga season.

== Career statistics ==
=== Regular season and playoffs ===
			Regular season					Playoffs
Season	Team	League	GP	G	A	Pts	PIM	GP	G	A	Pts	PIM
