= Markus Seikola =

Finnish ice hockey player

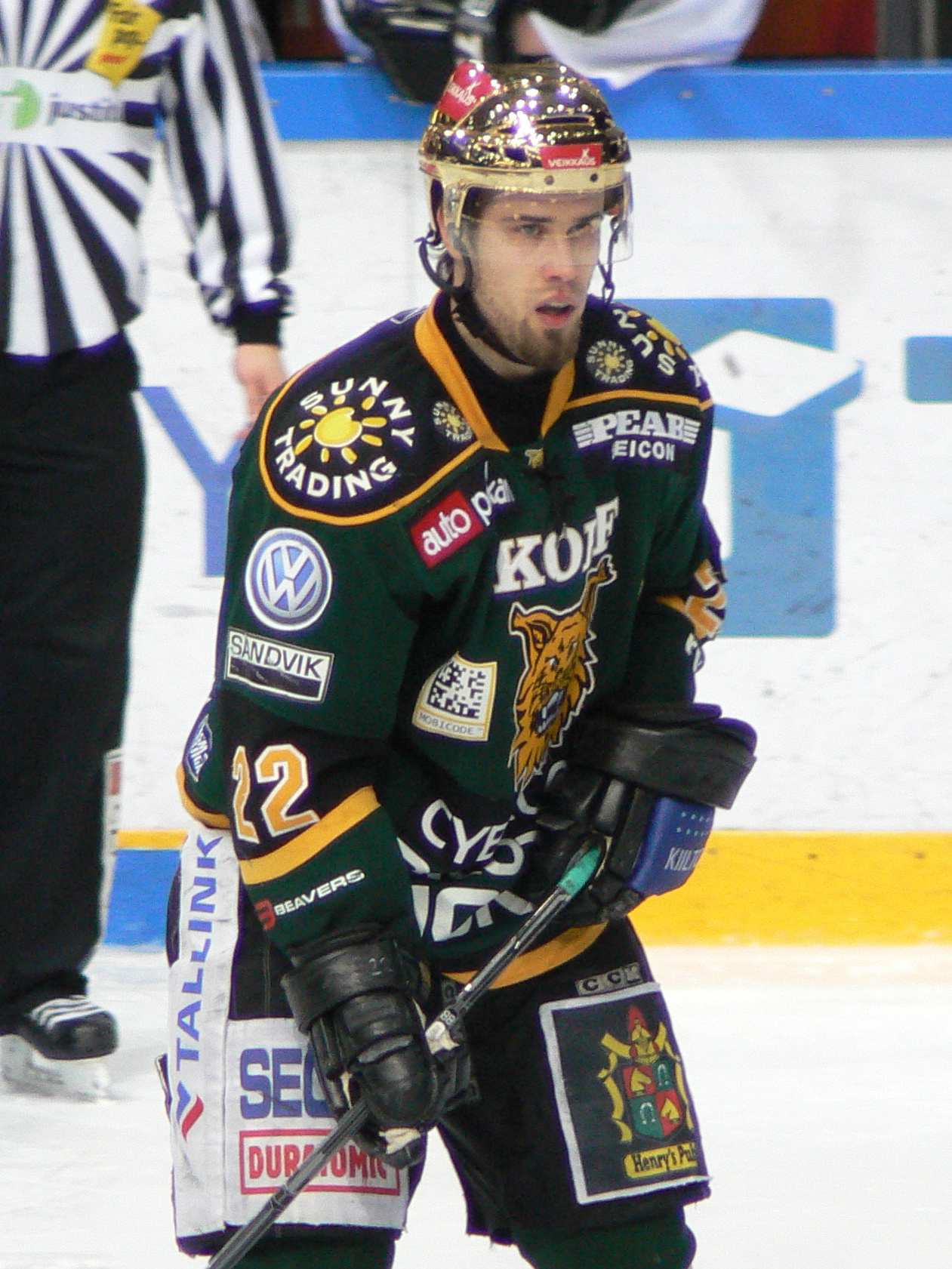
- Born: June 5, 1982 (age 43) Laitila, Finland
- Height: 6 ft 1 in (185 cm)
- Weight: 185 lb (84 kg; 13 st 3 lb)
- Position: Defenceman
- Shot: Right
- SM-liiga team: Tampereen Ilves
- NHL draft: 209th, 2000; Toronto Maple Leafs
- Playing career: 2000–2016

Markus Seikola (born June 5, 1982), is a professional Finnish ice hockey player. He is currently a defenceman for Ilves in the SM-liiga. Seikola was drafted in the 7th round, 209th overall, by the Toronto Maple Leafs during the 2000 NHL entry draft.

== Career statistics ==
=== Regular season and playoffs ===
			Regular season					Playoffs
Season	Team	League	GP	G	A	Pts	PIM	GP	G	A	Pts	PIM
1998–99	TPS	FIN U18	36	2	10	12	24	—	—	—	—	—
1999–2000	TPS	FIN U18	29	16	10	26	8	—	—	—	—	—
1999–2000	TPS	FIN U20	9	2	1	3	6	13	1	0	1	0
2000–01	TPS	FIN U20	26	13	7	20	6	2	0	0	0	0
2000–01	TPS	SM-l	23	1	0	1	16	10	1	0	1	0
2001–02	TPS	FIN U20	1	0	1	1	2	2	1	0	1	2
2001–02	TPS	SM-l	51	4	4	8	20	7	1	1	2	12
2002–03	TPS	SM-l	56	5	4	9	36	7	1	0	1	2
2003–04	TPS	SM-l	46	3	6	9	12	13	0	1	1	6
2004–05	TPS	SM-l	56	5	9	14	14	6	0	1	1	4
2005–06	TPS	SM-l	41	2	3	5	18	—	—	—	—	—
2005–06	Frölunda HC	SEL	9	3	5	8	6	17	1	1	2	22
2006–07	Frölunda HC	SEL	49	5	14	19	46	—	—	—	—	—
2007–08	HPK	SM-l	45	5	8	13	74	—	—	—	—	—
2008–09	Ilves	SM-l	50	18	27	45	95	3	0	1	1	2
2009–10	Ilves	SM-l	55	17	22	39	84	—	—	—	—	—
2010–11	Södertälje SK	SEL	44	2	16	18	20	—	—	—	—	—
2011–12	Pelicans	SM-l	52	16	16	32	48	16	0	5	5	18
2012–13	Pelicans	SM-l	55	13	11	24	42	—	—	—	—	—
2013–14	TPS	Liiga	15	0	2	2	12	—	—	—	—	—
2014–15	TPS	Liiga	18	0	2	2	4	—	—	—	—	—
2015–16	VG–62	FIN.3	4	0	2	2	4	—	—	—	—	—
2015–16	TUTO Hockey	FIN.2	5	0	2	2	27	6	0	1	1	31
SM-l/Liiga totals			563	89	114	203	475	62	3	9	12	44
SEL totals			102	10	35	45	72	17	1	1	2	22

=== International ===
Year	Team	Event	GP	G	A	Pts	PIM
2000	Finland	WJC18	7	1	4	5	4
2002	Finland	WJC	7	1	2	3	16
Junior totals			14	2	6	8	20
