= Jukka Voutilainen =

Finnish ice hockey player

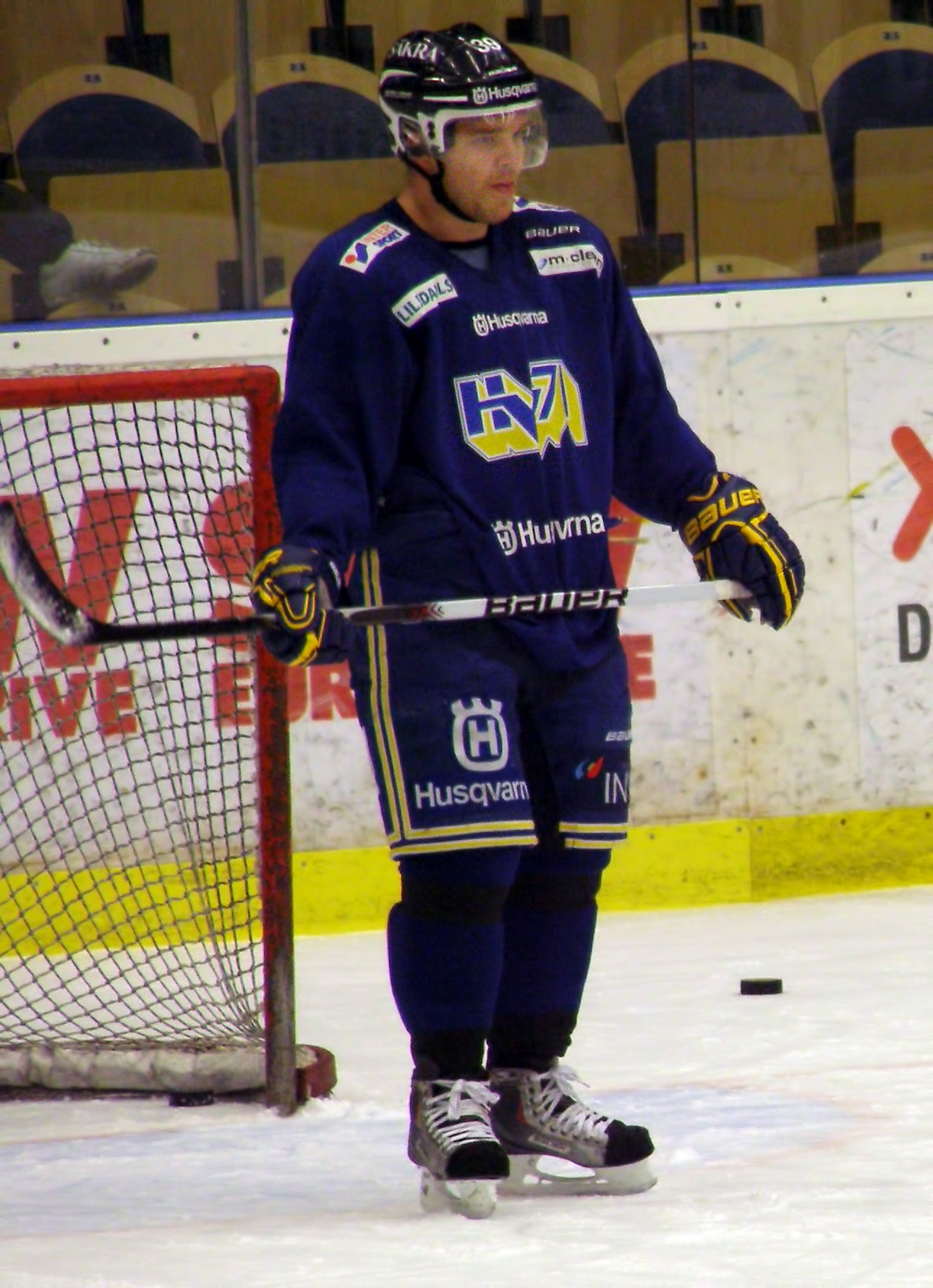
- Born: May 14, 1980 (age 45) Kuopio, FIN
- Height: 5 ft 10 in (178 cm)
- Weight: 196 lb (89 kg; 14 st 0 lb)
- Position: Right wing
- Shot: Right
- Played for: Jokerit; HPK; HV71; KalPa; Tappara
- Playing career: 2001–2015

Jukka Voutilainen (born May 14, 1980, in Kuopio, Finland) is a Finnish former professional ice hockey forward, who played in the Liiga and Swedish Hockey League (SHL).

== Playing career ==
Voutilainen started his professional career in 2001, when he played seven games for Jokerit in the Finnish SM-liiga. From 2002, he was a regular in the league. In season 2004–05 he finished the season with the best plus/minus statistic in SM-liiga (+34). On April 23, 2006, Voutilainen signed a two-year contract deal with the Swedish Jönköping-based club HV71 in Elitserien and extended it for another two years in December 2007 which was followed by another four-year extension in February 2010. He was released though in May 2012, and he return to Finland to re-sign with his hometown team KalPa who he played with at junior level.

After parts of three seasons with KalPa, Voutilainen left Finland for just the second time in his career to sign a one-year contract with German club, Schwenninger Wild Wings of the DEL on June 16, 2015. Before the start of the season, he was mutually released from his contract with the German club on October 12, 2015.

== Records ==
- SM-liiga 2004–05 record for plus/minus (34)
- Elitserien 2007–08 record for plus/minus (20)
- Elitserien 2007–08 playoffs record for goals (9)
- Elitserien 2007–08 playoffs record for points (21)

== Career statistics ==
| | | | Regular season | | | | | Playoffs |
| Season | Team | League | GP | G | A | Pts | PIM | GP | G | A | Pts | PIM |
|---|---|---|---|---|---|---|---|---|---|---|---|---|
| 2001–02 | Jokerit | SM-l | 7 | 1 | 0 | 1 | 2 | 11 | 2 | 2 | 4 | 0 |
| 2001–02 | Kiekko-Vantaa | Mestis | 4 | 1 | 0 | 1 | 4 | — | — | — | — | — |
| 2002–03 | Jokerit | SM-l | 53 | 12 | 12 | 24 | 8 | 10 | 1 | 3 | 4 | 0 |
| 2003–04 | HPK | SM-l | 44 | 11 | 15 | 26 | 4 | 8 | 2 | 1 | 3 | 12 |
| 2004–05 | HPK | SM-l | 47 | 23 | 19 | 42 | 38 | 9 | 2 | 3 | 5 | 6 |
| 2005–06 | HPK | SM-l | 50 | 24 | 17 | 41 | 20 | 12 | 3 | 5 | 8 | 4 |
| 2006–07 | HV71 | SEL | 50 | 15 | 19 | 34 | 26 | 14 | 4 | 3 | 7 | 4 |
| 2007–08 | HV71 | SEL | 51 | 26 | 20 | 46 | 30 | 17 | 9 | 12 | 21 | 12 |
| 2008–09 | HV71 | SEL | 52 | 17 | 30 | 47 | 63 | 18 | 4 | 8 | 12 | 8 |
| 2009–10 | HV71 | SEL | 37 | 16 | 21 | 37 | 10 | 15 | 6 | 9 | 15 | 12 |
| 2010–11 | HV71 | SEL | 36 | 8 | 13 | 21 | 20 | 4 | 0 | 2 | 2 | 0 |
| 2011–12 | HV71 | SEL | 52 | 14 | 19 | 33 | 18 | 6 | 1 | 1 | 2 | 0 |
| 2012–13 | KalPa | SM-l | 29 | 10 | 7 | 17 | 16 | — | — | — | — | — |
| 2013–14 | KalPa | Liiga | 35 | 7 | 8 | 15 | 12 | — | — | — | — | — |
| 2013–14 | Tappara | Liiga | 6 | 2 | 1 | 3 | 2 | 18 | 6 | 6 | 12 | 12 |
| 2014–15 | KalPa | Liiga | 56 | 17 | 8 | 25 | 20 | 6 | 0 | 2 | 2 | 2 |
| Liiga totals | | | 327 | 107 | 87 | 194 | 122 | 74 | 16 | 22 | 38 | 36 |
| SHL totals | | | 278 | 96 | 122 | 218 | 167 | 74 | 24 | 35 | 59 | 36 |

== Awards ==
- SM-liiga Player of the Month in October 2004.
- Awarded Matti Keinonen trophy (best plus-minus statistics) in 2005.
- SM-liiga Champion with HPK in 2006.
- Elitserien Champion with HV71 in 2008 and 2010.
- Elitserien playoff silver medal with HV71 in 2009.
