= Alexandr Vasiliev (ice hockey) =

Russian ice hockey player

Aleksandr Vasiliev
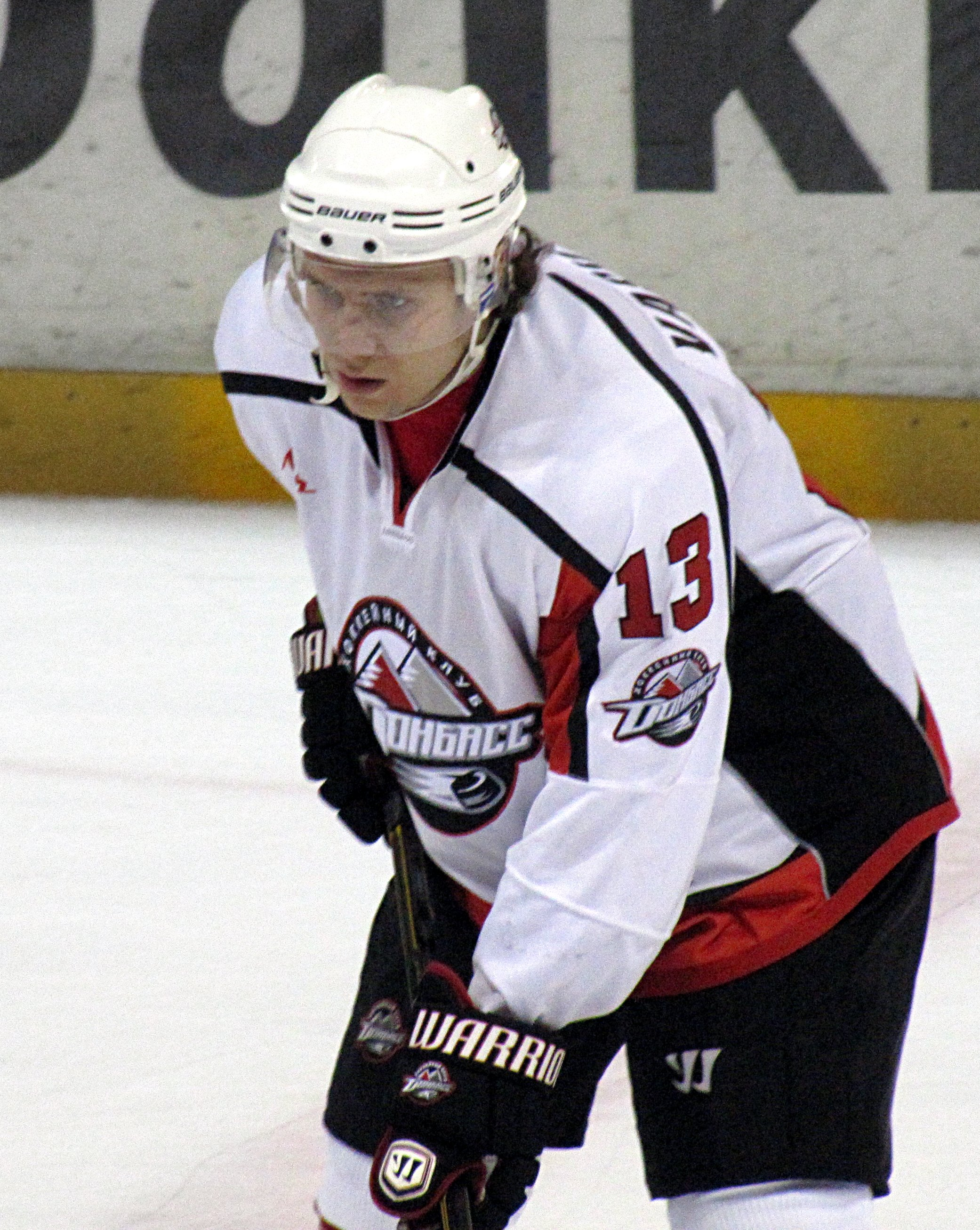
- Born: May 16, 1989 (age 37) Elektrostal, Russia
- Height: 5 ft 10 in (178 cm)
- Weight: 1,985 lb (900 kg; 141 st 11 lb)
- Position: Right wing
- Shoots: Left
- UHL team Former teams: HC Donbass; HC Vityaz; Atlant Mytishchi; Metallurg Novokuznetsk; Spartak Moscow; Torpedo Nizhny Novgorod; Danbury Hat Tricks
- Playing career: 2008–present

Alexandr Vasiliev (born May 16, 1989) is a Russian professional ice hockey winger who currently plays with HC Donbass in the Ukrainian Hockey League (UHL). He has formerly played in the Kontinental Hockey League (KHL).

Medal record

Ice hockey

Representing Russia

World Junior A Challenge
Bronze medal – third place	2006 Yorkton	
