= Pavel Kašpařík =

Czech ice hockey player

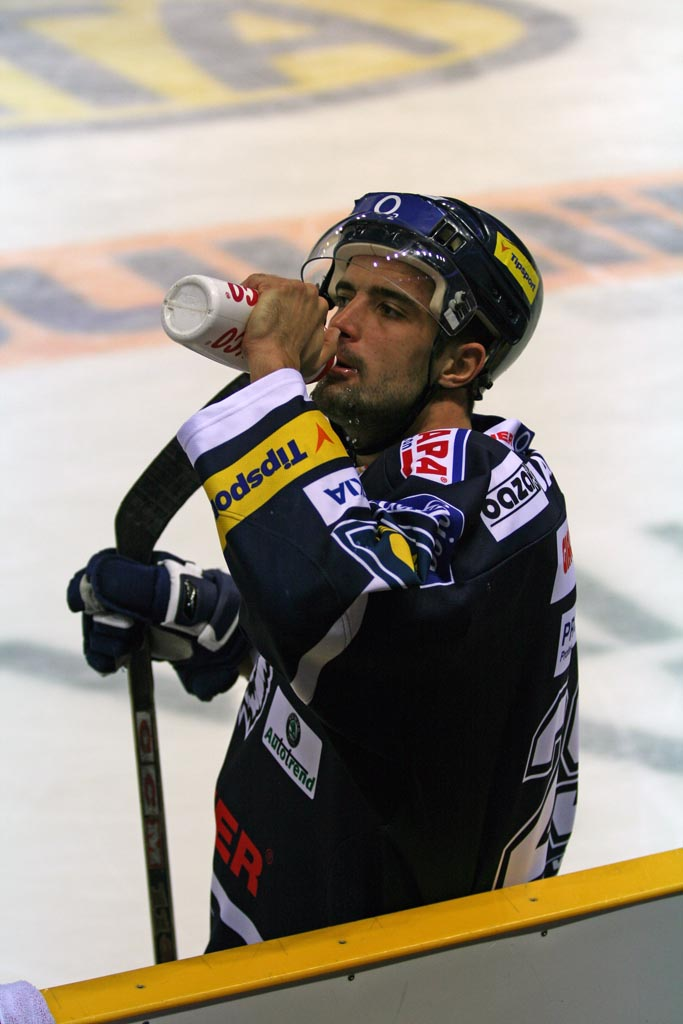
- Born: January 11, 1973 (age 53) Písek, Czechoslovakia
- Height: 6 ft 2 in (188 cm)
- Weight: 207 lb (94 kg; 14 st 11 lb)
- Position: Forward
- Shot: Left
- Played for: IHC Písek; HC Havířov; HC Sparta Praha; HC Hamé Zlín; HC Energie Karlovy Vary; HC Bílí Tygři Liberec; HC České Budějovice; HC Plzeň; BK Mladá Boleslav
- National team: Czech Republic
- NHL draft: 200th overall, 1999; Philadelphia Flyers
- Playing career: 1997–2016

Pavel Kašpařík (born January 11, 1979, in Písek, Czechoslovakia) is a former Czech professional ice hockey player who played 16 seasons in the Czech Extraliga. He was selected by the Philadelphia Flyers in the 7th round (200th overall) of the 1999 NHL entry draft.

== Playing career ==
Kašpařík has spent his whole career with many teams, starting at the local team IHC Písek in Czech First League, then HC Sparta Praha in Czech Extraliga. He played for HC Liberec in 2003–2004, then back in Sparta Prague for 2 seasons, before playing with HC Hamé Zlín in 2006–2007, then he has been playing again in Liberec for 2007–2009.

In 1999, Kašpařík was #200 in the draft (round seven), picked by Philadelphia Flyers, however he did not play in the NHL.
