= Stanislav Galimov =

Russian ice hockey player (born 1988)

- Born: 12 February 1988 (age 37) Magnitogorsk, Russian SFSR, Soviet Union
- Height: 6 ft 2 in (188 cm)
- Weight: 179 lb (81 kg; 12 st 11 lb)
- Position: Goaltender
- Catches: Left
- Slovak team Former teams: HC 19 Humenné; Ak Bars Kazan; Atlant Moscow Oblast; CSKA Moscow; Torpedo Nizhny Novgorod; Metallurg Magnitogorsk; Traktor Chelyabinsk; Dinamo Riga; Oulun Kärpät; Avangard Omsk
- Playing career: 2008–present

Stanislav Galimov (born 12 February 1988) is a Russian professional ice hockey goaltender who is currently playing for HC 19 Humenné of the Slovak Extraliga.

On 27 July 2021, Galimov signed a one-year contract as a free agent to play in the Liiga with his second non-Russian club, Kärpät.

== Awards and achievements ==
Award	Year
KHL Best SVS% (.943)	2012–13
