= Jukka Hentunen =

Finnish ice hockey player (born 1974)

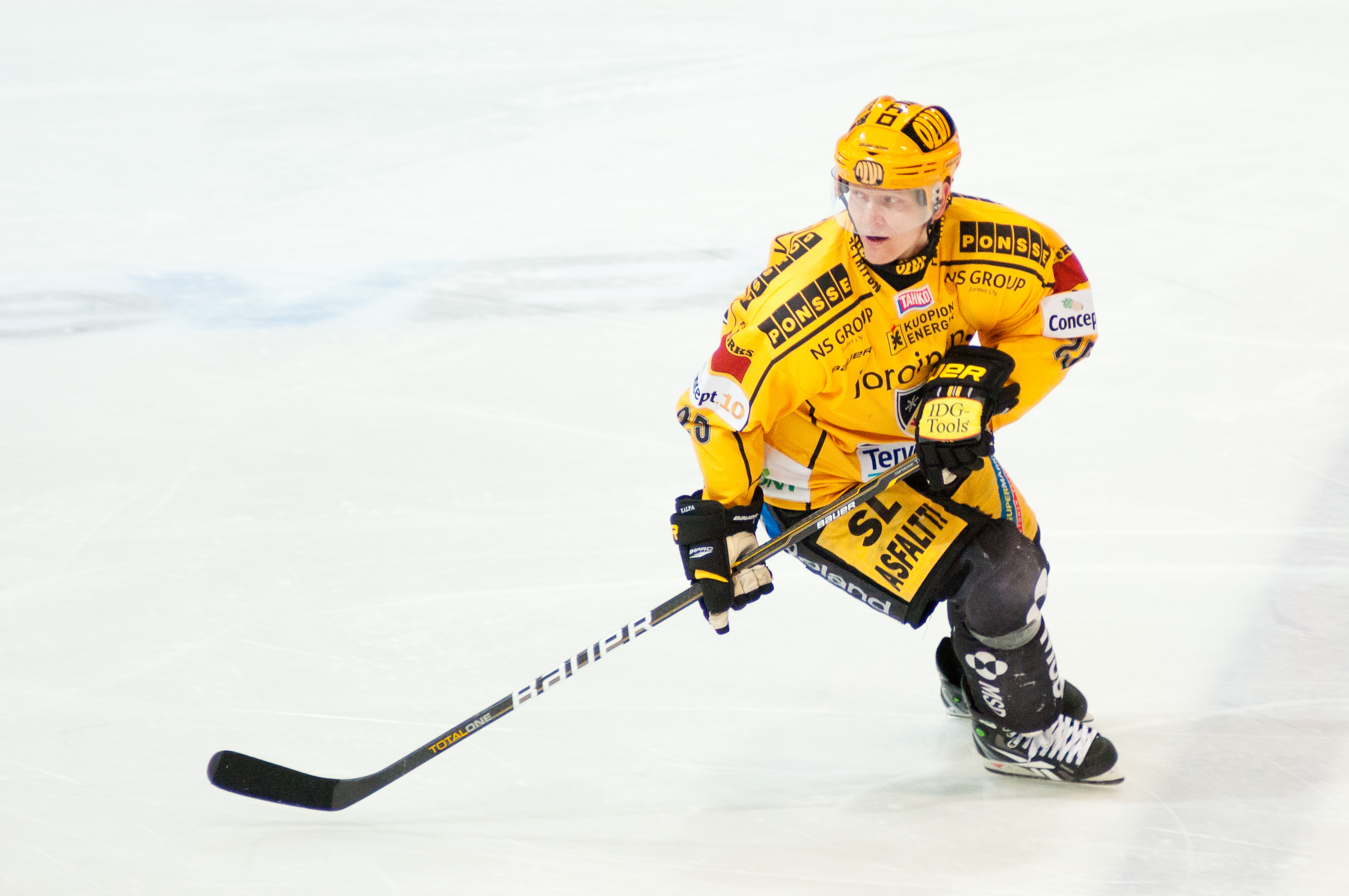
- Jukka Hentunen in December 2011.
- Born: May 3, 1974 (age 51) Joroinen, Finland
- Height: 5 ft 10 in (178 cm)
- Weight: 198 lb (90 kg; 14 st 2 lb)
- Position: Right wing
- Shot: Right
- Played for: HPK; Jokerit; Calgary Flames; Nashville Predators; HC Fribourg-Gottéron; HC Lugano; Ak Bars Kazan; KalPa
- National team: Finland
- NHL draft: 176th overall, 2000; Calgary Flames
- Playing career: 1998–2013

Jukka Mika Petteri Hentunen (born May 3, 1974) is a Finnish former professional ice hockey forward, who last played with KalPa of the SM-liiga in the 2012–13 season.

== Playing career ==
Hentunen played with HPK of the SM-liiga when he was drafted by the Calgary Flames as their sixth-round pick, 176th overall, in the 2000 NHL entry draft. He played a total of 38 National Hockey League games in the 2001–02 NHL season for the Calgary Flames and the Nashville Predators, who he was traded to on March 19, 2002.

Hentunen then promptly left North America to continue his professional career in the European leagues. After two years with HC Fribourg-Gottéron, the right winger signed with Swiss rivals, HC Lugano.

In Finland he's earned a nickname "Härkä" which translates to "bull."

== Career statistics ==
=== Regular season and playoffs ===
			Regular season					Playoffs
Season	Team	League	GP	G	A	Pts	PIM	GP	G	A	Pts	PIM
1993–94	Warkis	FIN.3	16	7	6	13	10	—	—	—	—	—
1994–95	Warkis	FIN.3	29	23	23	46	28	—	—	—	—	—
1995–96	Diskos	FIN.2	43	23	18	41	14	—	—	—	—	—
1996–97	Hermes	FIN.2	35	10	13	23	43	3	1	0	1	0
1997–98	Hermes	FIN.2	44	15	16	31	26	8	7	3	10	10
1998–99	HPK	SM-l	41	13	21	34	32	8	1	4	5	12
1999–2000	HPK	SM-l	53	17	28	45	76	8	4	2	6	12
2000–01	Jokerit	SM-l	56	27	28	55	24	5	1	0	1	4
2001–02	Calgary Flames	NHL	28	2	3	5	4	—	—	—	—	—
2001–02	Saint John Flames	AHL	9	3	3	6	0	—	—	—	—	—
2001–02	Nashville Predators	NHL	10	2	2	4	0	—	—	—	—	—
2002–03	Jokerit	SM-l	48	11	11	22	28	10	4	2	6	0
2003–04	HC Fribourg–Gottéron	NLA	47	25	28	53	22	4	2	4	6	6
2004–05	HC Fribourg–Gottéron	NLA	44	24	20	44	46	—	—	—	—	—
2005–06	HC Lugano	NLA	44	24	18	42	44	17	7	6	13	6
2006–07	HC Lugano	NLA	44	26	20	46	63	6	1	4	5	0
2007–08	HC Lugano	NLA	13	5	9	14	6	—	—	—	—	—
2007–08	Ak Bars Kazan	RSL	33	10	17	27	10	10	2	8	10	33
2008–09	Ak Bars Kazan	KHL	54	14	13	27	36	21	9	2	11	8
2009–10	Jokerit	SM-l	58	28	22	50	50	3	0	2	2	4
2010–11	Jokerit	SM-l	55	6	26	32	38	7	2	4	6	2
2011–12	KalPa	SM-l	55	18	13	31	18	6	1	1	2	25
2012–13	KalPa	SM-l	45	7	14	21	20	5	0	1	1	6
FIN.2 totals			122	48	47	95	83	21	13	9	22	14
SM-l totals			411	127	163	290	286	52	13	16	29	65
NLA totals			192	104	95	199	181	35	15	20	35	18

=== International ===
Medal record

Representing Finland

Ice hockey

Olympic Games
Silver medal – second place	2006	Turin

World Championships
Silver medal – second place	2001	Germany
Silver medal – second place	2007	Russia
Bronze medal – third place	2000	Russia
Bronze medal – third place	2006	Latvia

Year	Team	Event	Result	GP	G	A	Pts	PIM
2000	Finland	WC	3rd place, bronze medalist(s)	9	3	3	6	12
2001	Finland	WC	2nd place, silver medalist(s)	9	1	3	4	2
2004	Finland	WC	6th	7	3	3	6	2
2004	Finland	WCH	2nd place, silver medalist(s)	6	1	1	2	2
2005	Finland	WC	7th	7	3	1	4	6
2006	Finland	OG	2nd place, silver medalist(s)	8	0	0	0	2
2006	Finland	WC	3rd place, bronze medalist(s)	9	1	3	4	20
2007	Finland	WC	2nd place, silver medalist(s)	9	4	1	5	4
Senior totals				64	16	15	31	50
