= Georgy Gelashvili =

Russian ice hockey player (born 1983)

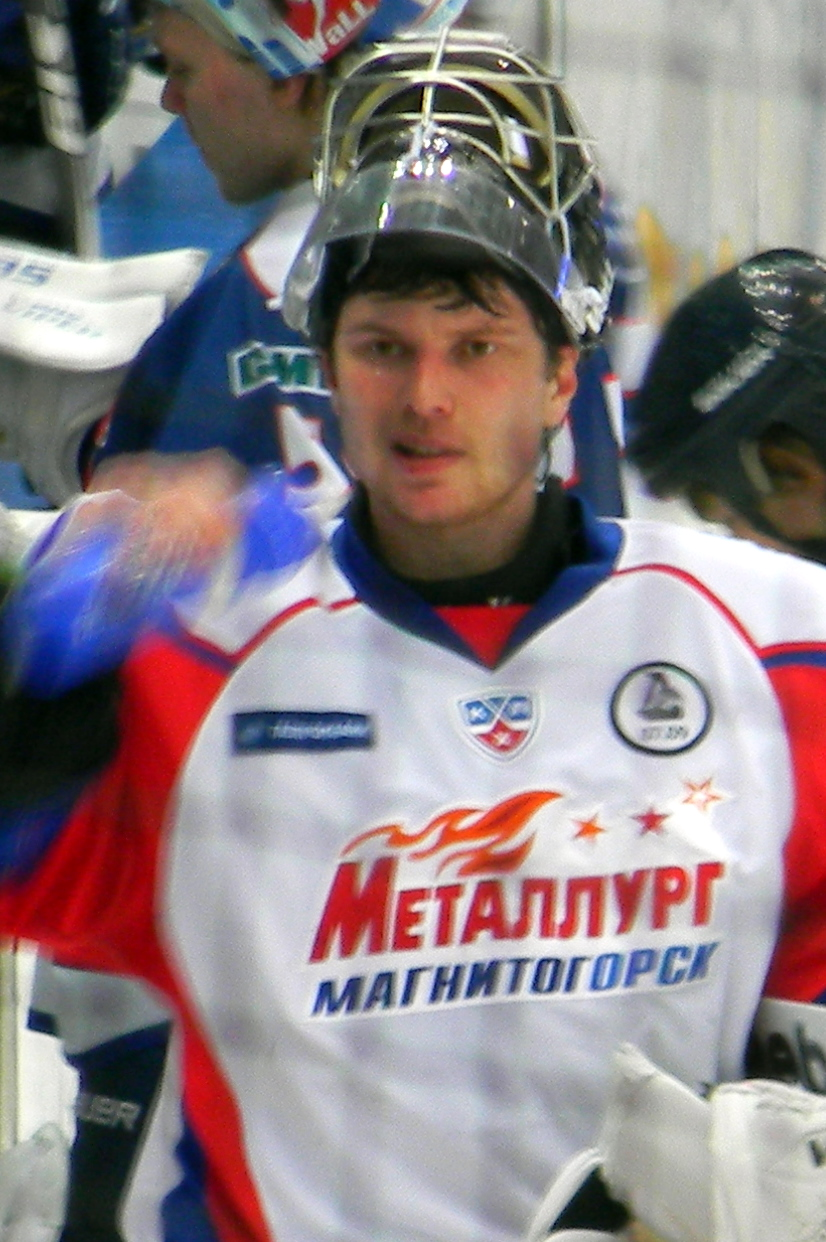
- Born: August 30, 1983 (age 42); Chelyabinsk, Russian SFSR
- Height: 6 ft 2 in (188 cm)
- Weight: 211 lb (96 kg; 15 st 1 lb)
- Position: Goaltender
- Catches: Left
- VHL team Former teams: Saryarka Karaganda; Traktor Chelyabinsk; Kazakhmys Satpaev; Lokomotiv Yaroslavl; Metallurg Magnitogorsk; Torpedo Nizhny Novgorod; HC Yugra
- Playing career: 2006–present

Georgy Gelashvili (Russian: Гео́ргий Како́евич Гелашви́ли, Georgian: გიორგი გელაშვილი, born August 30, 1983) is a Russian professional ice hockey goaltender. He is currently playing for Saryarka Karaganda in the Supreme Hockey League (VHL).
