= Alexei Tereshchenko =

Russian professional ice hockey forward (born 1980)

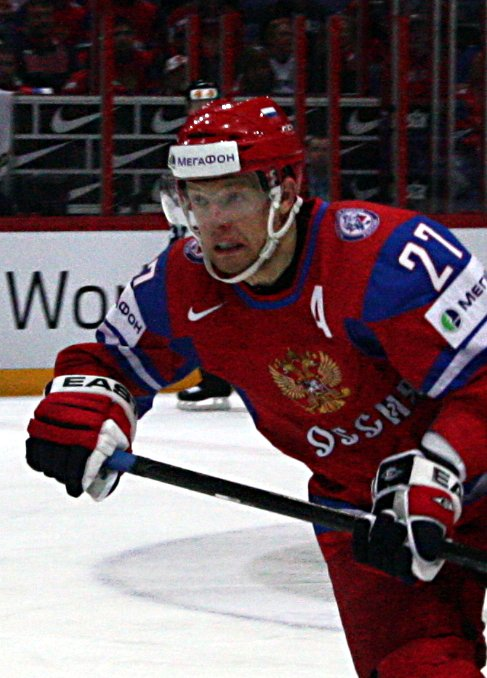
- Born: 16 December 1980 (age 45) Mozhaysk, Russian SFSR, Soviet Union
- Height: 5 ft 11 in (180 cm)
- Weight: 183 lb (83 kg; 13 st 1 lb)
- Position: Centre
- Shot: Left
- Played for: Dynamo Moscow; Ak Bars Kazan; Salavat Yulaev Ufa; Dinamo Minsk; Avangard Omsk
- National team: Russia
- NHL draft: 91st overall, 2000; Dallas Stars
- Playing career: 1998–2020

Alexei Vladimirovich Tereshchenko (Russian: Алексей Владимирович Терещенко; born 16 December 1980) is a Russian former professional ice hockey forward. He most recently played for Avangard Omsk of the Kontinental Hockey League (KHL).

== Playing career ==
From 1998 until 2004, Tereshchenko played for the Russian Super League club Dynamo Moscow before joining Ak Bars Kazan. In 2007, he joined Salavat Yulaev Ufa. In 2008, he won the Russian championship with Ufa, and won the IIHF World Championship the same year.

On 15 July 2014, Tereshchenko returned to Dynamo Moscow on a one-year contract for the 2014–15 season.

== International play ==
Tereshchenko was also selected as a reserve by the Russia men's national ice hockey team for the 2010 Winter Olympics should an injury occur during the tournament. In 2014, he was selected for Team Russia for the Sochi Olympics, where he scored 3 points in 5 games.

== Honours ==
- Russian Championship: 2000, 2005, 2006, 2008
- IIHF European Champions Cup: 2007

== Career statistics ==
=== Regular season and playoffs ===
			Regular season					Playoffs
Season	Team	League	GP	G	A	Pts	PIM	GP	G	A	Pts	PIM
1996–97	Dynamo–2 Moscow	RUS.3	9	0	0	0	2	—	—	—	—	—
1997–98	Dynamo–2 Moscow	RUS.2	19	0	1	1	6	—	—	—	—	—
1998–99	Dynamo Moscow	RSL	1	0	1	1	0	2	0	0	0	0
1998–99	Dynamo–2 Moscow	RUS.2	28	4	17	21	20	—	—	—	—	—
1998–99	THK Tver	RUS.2	12	3	4	7	4	—	—	—	—	—
1999–2000	Dynamo Moscow	RSL	27	1	1	2	10	16	1	1	2	8
2000–01	Dynamo Moscow	RSL	39	3	3	6	18	—	—	—	—	—
2001–02	Dynamo Moscow	RSL	40	3	7	10	20	3	0	0	0	0
2002–03	Dynamo Moscow	RSL	40	7	9	16	14	5	1	0	1	2
2003–04	Dynamo Moscow	RSL	47	8	12	20	26	3	0	0	0	4
2003–04	Dynamo–2 Moscow	RUS.3	1	2	1	3	2	—	—	—	—	—
2004–05	Dynamo Moscow	RSL	31	3	6	9	8	10	0	1	1	2
2004–05	Dynamo–2 Moscow	RUS.3	2	0	0	0	0	—	—	—	—	—
2005–06	Ak Bars Kazan	RSL	36	3	12	15	12	10	0	4	4	12
2006–07	Ak Bars Kazan	RSL	53	8	22	30	38	14	3	6	9	6
2007–08	Salavat Yulaev Ufa	RSL	51	16	24	40	22	16	5	4	9	6
2008–09	Salavat Yulaev Ufa	KHL	55	29	29	58	22	4	0	1	1	8
2009–10	Ak Bars Kazan	KHL	52	12	13	25	18	22	2	5	7	6
2010–11	Ak Bars Kazan	KHL	42	7	11	18	16	9	2	2	4	0
2011–12	Ak Bars Kazan	KHL	50	9	14	23	26	11	1	3	4	29
2012–13	Ak Bars Kazan	KHL	40	11	19	30	10	18	2	3	5	2
2013–14	Ak Bars Kazan	KHL	47	10	15	25	38	6	0	2	2	2
2014–15	Dynamo Moscow	KHL	45	7	7	14	12	11	2	0	2	2
2015–16	Dynamo Moscow	KHL	48	9	15	24	26	10	1	3	4	6
2016–17	Dynamo Moscow	KHL	32	4	13	17	10	8	2	5	7	10
2018–19	Dinamo Minsk	KHL	30	6	10	16	6	—	—	—	—	—
2019–20	Avangard Omsk	KHL	3	0	1	1	0	1	0	1	1	0
RSL totals			365	52	97	149	168	79	10	16	26	40
KHL totals			471	106	154	260	206	100	12	25	37	65

=== International ===
Year	Team	Event	Result	GP	G	A	Pts	PIM
2000	Russia	WJC	2nd place, silver medalist(s)	7	3	5	8	2
2008	Russia	WC	1st place, gold medalist(s)	9	2	4	6	2
2009	Russia	WC	1st place, gold medalist(s)	9	3	2	5	6
2010	Russia	WC	2nd place, silver medalist(s)	9	0	1	1	4
2011	Russia	WC	4th	8	1	0	1	2
2012	Russia	WC	1st place, gold medalist(s)	10	2	1	3	2
2013	Russia	WC	6th	8	1	4	5	2
2014	Russia	OG	5th	5	1	2	3	2
Junior totals				7	3	5	8	2
Senior totals				58	10	14	24	20
