= Jan Marek (ice hockey, born 1979) =

Czech ice hockey player (1979–2011)

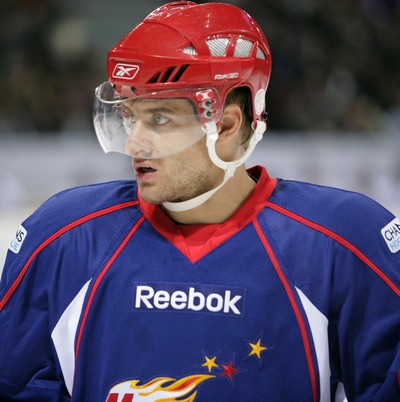
- Born: December 31, 1979 Jindřichův Hradec, Czechoslovakia
- Died: September 7, 2011 (aged 31) Yaroslavl, Russia
- Height: 5 ft 10 in (178 cm)
- Weight: 187 lb (85 kg; 13 st 5 lb)
- Position: Centre
- Shot: Right
- Played for: HC Oceláři Třinec; HC Sparta Praha; Metallurg Magnitogorsk; HC CSKA Moscow; Atlant Mytishchi
- National team: Czech Republic
- NHL draft: 243rd overall, 2003; New York Rangers
- Playing career: 1998–2011

Jan Marek
Medal record

Representing Czech Republic

World Championships
Gold medal – first place	2010 Cologne	Ice hockey
Bronze medal – third place	2011 Bratislava	Ice hockey

Jan Marek (December 31, 1979 – September 7, 2011) was a Czech professional ice hockey centre. He was selected by the New York Rangers in the 8th round (243rd overall) of the 2003 NHL entry draft.

== Playing career ==
Marek played in the Czech Extraliga for HC Oceláři Třinec and HC Sparta Praha before moving to Russia in 2006. He would play in the Russian Superleague and the Kontinental Hockey League for Metallurg Magnitogorsk, HC CSKA Moscow and Atlant Moscow Oblast. He led the KHL in goals scored in the 2008–09 KHL season with 35. Marek signed with Lokomotiv Yaroslavl for the 2011-12 KHL season but was killed before playing a game for the team.

== Death ==
On September 7, 2011, Marek died when a Yakovlev Yak-42 passenger aircraft, carrying nearly the entire Lokomotiv team, crashed just outside Yaroslavl, Russia. The team was traveling to Minsk to play their opening game of the season against HC Dinamo Minsk, with its coaching staff and prospects. Lokomotiv officials said "everyone from the main roster was on the plane plus four players from the youth team."

== Career statistics ==
=== Regular season and playoffs ===
			Regular season					Playoffs
Season	Team	League	GP	G	A	Pts	PIM	GP	G	A	Pts	PIM
1995–96	HC Vajgar Jindřichův Hradec	CZE U18	39	29	27	56		—	—	—	—	—
1996–97	HC Vajgar Jindřichův Hradec	CZE U20
1997–98	HC Vajgar Jindřichův Hradec	CZE U20	32	21	28	49		9	5	4	9
1997–98	HC Vajgar Jindřichův Hradec	CZE.2	19	3	4	7		—	—	—	—	—
1998–99	HC Železárny Třinec	CZE U20
1998–99	HC Železárny Třinec	ELH	33	2	2	4	2	6	0	0	0	0
1999–2000	HC Oceláři Třinec	CZE U20	6	5	5	10	10	1	0	0	0	0
1999–2000	HC Oceláři Třinec	ELH	32	1	5	6	4	2	0	0	0	0
1999–2000	HC Slezan Opava	CZE.2	3	0	1	1	4	—	—	—	—	—
1999–2000	SHC Vajgar Jindřichův Hradec	CZE.2	4	0	3	3	10	—	—	—	—	—
2000–01	HC Oceláři Třinec	ELH	38	7	4	11	2	—	—	—	—	—
2001–02	HC Oceláři Třinec	ELH	52	13	27	40	44	6	1	3	4	6
2002–03	HC Oceláři Třinec	ELH	51	32	30	62	42	12	6	4	10	22
2003–04	HC Sparta Praha	ELH	50	21	30	51	62	11	4	9	13	26
2004–05	HC Sparta Praha	ELH	38	7	21	28	26	5	2	2	4	2
2005–06	HC Sparta Praha	ELH	48	22	32	54	66	17	4	4	8	24
2006–07	Metallurg Magnitogorsk	RSL	47	17	30	47	70	15	7	10	17	10
2007–08	Metallurg Magnitogorsk	RSL	49	16	32	48	40	11	4	3	7	2
2008–09	Metallurg Magnitogorsk	KHL	53	35	37	72	62	12	6	4	10	26
2009–10	Metallurg Magnitogorsk	KHL	35	7	13	20	14	10	3	1	4	4
2010–11	CSKA Moscow	KHL	46	14	24	38	46	—	—	—	—	—
2010–11	Atlant Moscow Oblast	KHL	5	2	0	2	8	20	7	10	17	10
ELH totals			342	105	151	256	248	59	17	22	39	80
RSL totals			96	33	62	95	110	26	11	13	24	10
KHL totals			139	58	74	132	130	42	16	15	31	40

=== International ===
Year	Team	Event	GP	G	A	Pts	PIM
2007	Czech Republic	WC	6	2	3	5	4
2009	Czech Republic	WC	5	2	1	3	4
2010	Czech Republic	WC	9	3	0	3	4
2011	Czech Republic	WC	9	1	2	3	14
Senior totals			29	8	6	14	26

== See also ==
- List of ice hockey players who died during their playing career
