= Ilya Nikulin =

Russian ice hockey player (born 1982)

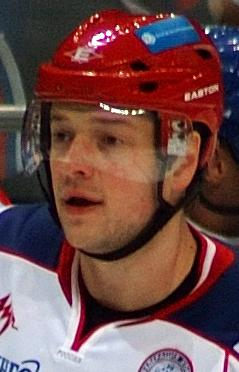
- Born: 12 March 1982 (age 44) Moscow, Russian SFSR, Soviet Union
- Height: 6 ft 3 in (191 cm)
- Weight: 211 lb (96 kg; 15 st 1 lb)
- Position: Defence
- Shot: Left
- Played for: Dynamo Moscow; Ak Bars Kazan
- National team: Russia
- NHL draft: 31st overall, 2000; Atlanta Thrashers
- Playing career: 2000–2019

Ilya Vladimirovich Nikulin (Russian: Илья Владимирович Никулин; born 12 March 1982) is a Russian former professional ice hockey defenceman. He played for HC Dynamo Moscow and Ak Bars Kazan in the Kontinental Hockey League (KHL). Nikulin was drafted by the Atlanta Thrashers in the second round, 31st overall in the 2000 NHL entry draft.

== Playing career ==
Later that year, Nikulin began his professional career in the Russian Superleague (RSL) with Dynamo Moscow. He played with Dynamo for five seasons. In 2005, he joined Ak Bars Kazan. His five-year contract with Kazan included allowing him to leave for the NHL. However, after negotiations in 2008 and 2009, Nikulin did not sign a contract with the Thrashers.

On 15 July 2020, Nikulin officially announced his retirement from professional hockey, ending a 19-year career.

== International play ==
Nikulin has played for Team Russia. He competed at the 1999 under-18 Championship, earned a silver medal at the 2000 World Junior Championship, a bronze at the 2007 World Championship, a silver at the 2010 World Championship and a gold at the 2008, 2009 and 2012 IIHF World Championships. He was selected to the 2010 Russian Olympic team.

== Personal ==
Nikulin is good friends with Alexander Ovechkin, with whom he played four seasons with during his tenure with Dynamo Moscow. He is also the godfather of Nikulin's son.

== Career statistics ==
=== Regular season and playoffs ===
			Regular season					Playoffs
Season	Team	League	GP	G	A	Pts	PIM	GP	G	A	Pts	PIM
1998–99	Dynamo–2 Moscow	RUS.2	23	0	2	2	18	—	—	—	—	—
1999–2000	Dynamo–2 Moscow	RUS.3	4	2	1	3	10	—	—	—	—	—
1999–2000	THK Tver	RUS.2	39	3	6	9	82	—	—	—	—	—
2000–01	Dynamo Moscow	RSL	44	0	4	4	61	—	—	—	—	—
2000–01	Dynamo–2 Moscow	RUS.3	1	0	0	0	2	—	—	—	—	—
2001–02	Dynamo Moscow	RSL	48	2	1	3	44	2	0	0	0	0
2001–02	Dynamo–2 Moscow	RUS.3	2	0	1	1	2	—	—	—	—	—
2002–03	Dynamo Moscow	RSL	40	1	4	5	46	5	0	1	1	4
2003–04	Dynamo Moscow	RSL	54	1	5	6	56	3	0	0	0	2
2003–04	Dynamo–2 Moscow	RUS.3	1	0	1	1	2	—	—	—	—	—
2004–05	Dynamo Moscow	RSL	50	1	9	10	65	10	0	3	3	8
2005–06	Ak Bars Kazan	RSL	49	9	9	18	48	13	4	0	4	36
2006–07	Ak Bars Kazan	RSL	51	11	14	25	99	16	4	4	8	18
2007–08	Ak Bars Kazan	RSL	57	3	15	18	95	10	1	3	4	14
2008–09	Ak Bars Kazan	KHL	53	7	26	33	72	17	2	8	10	22
2009–10	Ak Bars Kazan	KHL	49	6	27	33	86	22	5	6	11	14
2010–11	Ak Bars Kazan	KHL	49	6	35	41	56	9	1	3	4	10
2011–12	Ak Bars Kazan	KHL	51	9	15	24	52	12	1	3	4	29
2012–13	Ak Bars Kazan	KHL	51	12	22	34	46	18	4	6	10	28
2013–14	Ak Bars Kazan	KHL	52	5	20	25	56	6	1	4	5	6
2014–15	Ak Bars Kazan	KHL	58	13	15	28	44	20	1	6	7	6
2015–16	Dynamo Moscow	KHL	35	6	11	17	18	6	0	0	0	6
2016–17	Dynamo Moscow	KHL	47	7	16	23	36	10	1	4	5	4
2017–18	Dynamo Moscow	KHL	56	12	15	27	28	—	—	—	—	—
2018–19	Dynamo Moscow	KHL	61	9	15	24	55	11	0	2	2	4
RSL totals			393	28	61	89	514	59	9	11	20	82
KHL totals			562	92	217	309	549	131	16	42	58	129

=== International ===
Year	Team	Event	Result	GP	G	A	Pts	PIM
1999	Russia	WJC18	6th	7	0	1	1	4
2000	Russia	WJC18	2nd place, silver medalist(s)	6	1	1	2	10
2006	Russia	WC	5th	7	1	5	6	8
2007	Russia	WC	3rd place, bronze medalist(s)	9	2	0	2	4
2008	Russia	WC	1st place, gold medalist(s)	9	0	1	1	0
2009	Russia	WC	1st place, gold medalist(s)	9	1	3	4	4
2010	Russia	OG	6th	4	0	1	1	2
2010	Russia	WC	2nd place, silver medalist(s)	9	0	2	2	2
2011	Russia	WC	4th	9	3	1	4	2
2012	Russia	WC	1st place, gold medalist(s)	10	2	4	6	8
2013	Russia	WC	6th	8	1	3	4	2
2014	Russia	OG	5th	3	0	0	0	2
Junior totals				13	1	2	3	14
Senior totals				77	10	21	31	34
