= Tony Mårtensson =

Swedish ice hockey player (born 1980)

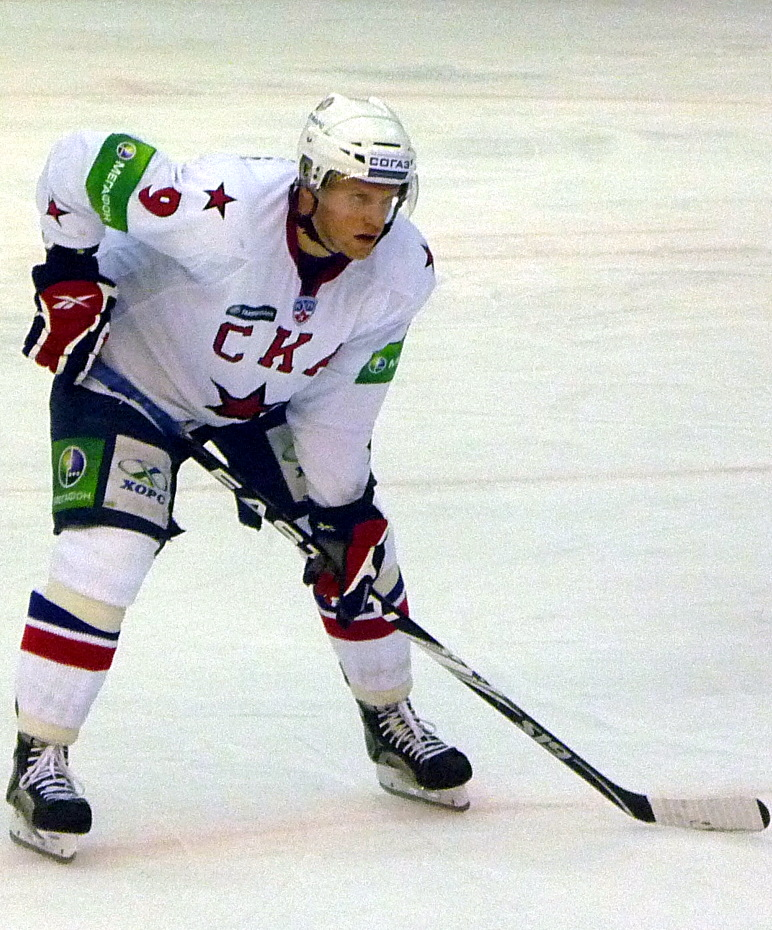
- Martensson with SKA Saint Petersburg in 2010
- Born: June 23, 1980 (age 46) Upplands Väsby, Sweden
- Height: 6 ft 0 in (183 cm)
- Weight: 187 lb (85 kg; 13 st 5 lb)
- Position: Centre
- Shot: Left
- Played for: Brynäs IF; Mighty Ducks of Anaheim; Linköpings HC; Ak Bars Kazan; SKA Saint Petersburg; HC Lugano
- National team: Sweden
- NHL draft: 224th overall, 2001; Mighty Ducks of Anaheim
- Playing career: 1997–2020

Tony Hans Mårtensson (born June 23, 1980) is a Swedish former professional ice hockey centre. He was born in Upplands Väsby, Sweden.

== Playing career ==
Mårtensson was drafted by the Mighty Ducks of Anaheim in the 2001 NHL entry draft in the seventh round as the 224th overall pick. He only played in six games with the Mighty Ducks during the 2003–04 season, scoring two points. Since season the 2004–05 season he played for Linköpings HC in the Swedish Elitserien. During the 2007–08 season, he led the league in points (67) and assists (50); and was also awarded Guldhjälmen as the most valuable player in the league during the regular season.

For the 2008–09 season, Mårtensson was on a 10-month loan to the Russian team Ak Bars Kazan of the Kontinental Hockey League (KHL), helping claim the KHL championship.

After five seasons with SKA St. Petersburg, capturing his second Gagarin Cup title in the 2014–15 season, Mårtensson agreed to a two-year contract with Swiss club, HC Lugano, on May 5, 2015.

== Career statistics ==
=== Regular season and playoffs ===
| | | | Regular season | | | | | Playoffs |
| Season | Team | League | GP | G | A | Pts | PIM | GP | G | A | Pts | PIM |
|---|---|---|---|---|---|---|---|---|---|---|---|---|
| 1996–97 | Wings HC | SWE.2 | 1 | 0 | 0 | 0 | 0 | — | — | — | — | — |
| 1997–98 | Wings HC | SWE.2 | 12 | 2 | 4 | 6 | 0 | 2 | 0 | 0 | 0 | 0 |
| 1998–99 | Wings HC | SWE.2 | 37 | 8 | 22 | 30 | 8 | 2 | 0 | 0 | 0 | 2 |
| 1999–2000 | Wings HC | Allsv | 44 | 21 | 28 | 49 | 15 | — | — | — | — | — |
| 2000–01 | Brynäs IF | J20 | 1 | 1 | 0 | 1 | 0 | — | — | — | — | — |
| 2000–01 | Brynäs IF | SEL | 50 | 15 | 11 | 26 | 20 | 4 | 0 | 1 | 1 | 2 |
| 2001–02 | Brynäs IF | SEL | 50 | 9 | 17 | 26 | 14 | 4 | 1 | 3 | 4 | 0 |
| 2002–03 | Cincinnati Mighty Ducks | AHL | 79 | 17 | 36 | 53 | 20 | — | — | — | — | — |
| 2003–04 | Cincinnati Mighty Ducks | AHL | 67 | 16 | 34 | 50 | 20 | 9 | 3 | 10 | 13 | 4 |
| 2003–04 | Mighty Ducks of Anaheim | NHL | 6 | 1 | 1 | 2 | 0 | — | — | — | — | — |
| 2004–05 | Linköpings HC | SEL | 50 | 13 | 21 | 34 | 12 | 5 | 0 | 1 | 1 | 0 |
| 2005–06 | Linköpings HC | SEL | 49 | 16 | 30 | 46 | 32 | 13 | 2 | 6 | 8 | 2 |
| 2006–07 | Linköpings HC | SEL | 55 | 18 | 36 | 54 | 20 | 15 | 2 | 9 | 11 | 16 |
| 2007–08 | Linköpings HC | SEL | 55 | 17 | 50 | 67 | 36 | 16 | 3 | 15 | 18 | 4 |
| 2008–09 | Ak Bars Kazan | KHL | 55 | 12 | 35 | 47 | 22 | 21 | 7 | 9 | 16 | 2 |
| 2009–10 | Linköpings HC | SEL | 55 | 19 | 44 | 63 | 26 | 12 | 5 | 7 | 12 | 2 |
| 2010–11 | SKA St. Petersburg | KHL | 54 | 10 | 23 | 33 | 28 | 11 | 0 | 3 | 3 | 4 |
| 2011–12 | SKA St. Petersburg | KHL | 54 | 23 | 38 | 61 | 10 | 15 | 1 | 3 | 4 | 2 |
| 2012–13 | SKA St. Petersburg | KHL | 52 | 20 | 23 | 43 | 20 | 15 | 7 | 10 | 17 | 8 |
| 2013–14 | SKA St. Petersburg | KHL | 44 | 8 | 15 | 23 | 20 | 10 | 2 | 4 | 6 | 6 |
| 2014–15 | SKA St. Petersburg | KHL | 56 | 12 | 20 | 32 | 20 | 22 | 4 | 6 | 10 | 29 |
| 2015–16 | HC Lugano | NLA | 42 | 11 | 24 | 35 | 22 | 15 | 8 | 6 | 14 | 4 |
| 2016–17 | HC Lugano | NLA | 47 | 13 | 20 | 33 | 18 | 7 | 0 | 0 | 0 | 2 |
| 2017–18 | Linköpings HC | SHL | 48 | 2 | 11 | 13 | 14 | 6 | 0 | 2 | 2 | 4 |
| 2018–19 | Almtuna IS | Allsv | 52 | 21 | 31 | 52 | 26 | — | — | — | — | — |
| 2019–20 | Almtuna IS | Allsv | 51 | 10 | 32 | 42 | 30 | — | — | — | — | — |
| SHL totals | | | 412 | 109 | 220 | 329 | 174 | 75 | 13 | 44 | 57 | 30 |
| KHL totals | | | 315 | 85 | 154 | 239 | 120 | 94 | 21 | 35 | 56 | 51 |
| NHL totals | | | 6 | 1 | 1 | 2 | 0 | — | — | — | — | — |

=== International ===
Medal record

Representing Sweden

Men's ice hockey

World Championships
| Gold medal – first place | 2006 Latvia | |
| Bronze medal – third place | 2009 Switzerland | |
| Bronze medal – third place | 2010 Germany | |

| Year | Team | Event | Result | GP | G | A | Pts | PIM |
|---|---|---|---|---|---|---|---|---|
| 1998 | Sweden | EJC18 | 1st place, gold medalist(s) | 6 | 3 | 1 | 4 | 4 |
| 2000 | Sweden | WJC | 5th | 7 | 2 | 4 | 6 | 6 |
| 2006 | Sweden | WC | 1st place, gold medalist(s) | 9 | 1 | 1 | 2 | 4 |
| 2007 | Sweden | WC | 4th | 9 | 4 | 7 | 11 | 8 |
| 2008 | Sweden | WC | 4th | 9 | 4 | 5 | 9 | 4 |
| 2009 | Sweden | WC | 3rd place, bronze medalist(s) | 9 | 1 | 9 | 10 | 8 |
| 2010 | Sweden | WC | 3rd place, bronze medalist(s) | 9 | 2 | 4 | 6 | 6 |
| Junior totals | | | | 13 | 5 | 5 | 10 | 6 |
| Senior totals | | | | 45 | 12 | 26 | 38 | 30 |
