= 2009–10 KHL season =

- League: Kontinental Hockey League
- Sport: Ice hockey
- Duration: 10 September 2009 – 27 April 2010
- Teams: 24

Regular season
- Continental Cup winner: (Russia) Salavat Yulaev Ufa
- Top scorer: (Russia) Sergei Mozyakin; Atlant Moscow Oblast

Playoffs
- Western champions: (Russia) HC MVD
- Western runners-up: (Russia) Lokomotiv Yaroslavl
- Eastern champions: (Russia) Ak Bars Kazan
- Eastern runners-up: (Russia) Salavat Yulaev Ufa

Gagarin Cup
- Champions: (Russia) Ak Bars Kazan
- Runners-up: (Russia) HC MVD
- Finals MVP: (Russia) Ilya Nikulin

KHL seasons
- ← 2008–09 2010–11 →

The 2009–10 KHL season was the second season of the Kontinental Hockey League. It was held from 10 September 2009 to 27 April 2010, with a break for the Olympic winter games from 8 February to 3 March. Ak Bars Kazan defended their title by defeating Western conference winners HC MVD in a seven-game play-off final.

== League changes ==
On 16 June 2009, the KHL Board of Directors approved several changes to the league for the 2009–10 season.

Team changes

The league admitted a new team, Avtomobilist Yekaterinburg. Khimik Voskresensk did not play in the 2009–10 season due to financial problems, but they retained KHL membership and may return at a later date, meanwhile playing in the Russian Major League. Overall, the number of teams playing in 2009–10 remained at 24.

Division realignment

Teams were geographically aligned to aid travel conditions. The league were divided into a Western and an Eastern conference, each containing two divisions of six teams. Each team played the other teams in the same division 4 times (for a total of 20 games) and each team in the other divisions 2 times (for a total of 36 games). The regular season thus consisted of 56 games for every team.

Play-off structure

The top eight teams from each conference qualified for the play-offs. Division winners were awarded the top two seeds. In each conference quarterfinals, semifinals and finals will be played and the conference winners play for the Gagarin Cup. Conference quarterfinals were best-of-five series, the remaining rounds best-of-seven series. Overtime periods last 20 minutes or until the sudden death goal.

Salary cap

The aggregate income of all players of a team was limited to 620 million rubles (~US$20 million). Minimum aggregate salary for the players was 200 million rubles (~US$6.5 million). Each teams was allowed one "franchise player" exception, who did not count towards the cap.

Rosters

25 players are allowed to be in the major team roster and 25 in the junior team roster of every club. The number of foreign players is restricted to 5, at most one of them as goaltender.

Junior league

The league implemented a more advanced and organized junior hockey sub-league to focus on development. It features players from 17 to 21 years of age.

Entry draft

On 1 June 2009, the inaugural entry draft for the KHL was held. Each team's hockey school was able to protect 25 players from the 17-21 agegroup prior to the draft.

Goal crease

Goal crease was shrunk to the NHL dimensions.

== Regular season ==
The regular season started on 10 September 2009 with the "Opening Cup" and ended on 7 March 2010. A few small breaks for the national team and the All-Star game as well as a large break for the Olympic winter games from 8 February to 3 March were scheduled. Each team played a total of 56 games (4 times against the division opponents and 2 times against all other teams). The winner of the regular season was awarded the Continental Cup.

=== Notable events ===
Opening Cup

The first game of each KHL season is the "Opening Cup" played between the two finalists of the last season. In 2009, the game was played at the TatNeft Arena in Kazan and won by last year's champion Ak Bars Kazan, beating runner-up Lokomotiv Yaroslavl 3–2 in overtime. The two teams were wearing special uniforms with an Opening Cup logo.

Fetisov comeback

On 11 December 2009, Russian hockey legend Viacheslav Fetisov gave a one-game comeback in professional hockey at the age of 51. In this game for CSKA Moscow he played for 8 minutes without a shot on the goal, but it created a very large media interest, not only for himself but also for CSKA Moscow and the KHL.

Mass brawl in Chekhov

On 9 January 2010, in the game between Vityaz Chekhov and Avangard Omsk, a bench-clearing brawl broke out in the 4th minute of the first period, and a bench- and penalty-box-clearing brawl broke out 39 seconds later, forcing the officials to abandon the game, since only four players were left to play. Thirty-three players and both teams' coaches were ejected, and a world record total of 707 penalty minutes were incurred. The KHL imposed fines totaling 5.7 million rubles ($191,000), suspended seven players, and counted the game as a 5–0 defeat for both teams, with no points being awarded.

All-Star Game

The 2nd KHL All-star game was played on 30 January 2010 in the new Minsk-Arena in Minsk, Belarus. As in the previous year, Team Jágr won against Team Yashin, this time with a score of 11–8.

Continental Cup

The first Continental Cup in the KHL history was won by Salavat Yulaev Ufa on 5 March 2010, after the club became unreachable by other clubs in the KHL standings one game before the end of the regular season, and extended their regular-season winning streak to three.

=== League standings ===
Source: khl.ru

Points are awarded as follows:

- 3 Points for a win in regulation ("W")
- 2 Points for a win in overtime ("OTW") or penalty shootout ("SOW")
- 1 Point for a loss in a penalty shootout ("SOL") or overtime ("OTL")
- 0 Points for a loss in regulation ("L")

Division winner
Qualified for playoffs

=== Conference standings ===
The conference standings will determine the seedings for the play-offs. The first two places in each conference are reserved for the division leaders.

Rank	Western Conference	GP	W	OTW	SOW	SOL	OTL	L	GF	GA	Pts
1	(Russia) SKA Saint Petersburg	56	36	1	3	3	3	10	192	118	122
2	(Russia) HC MVD	56	30	1	0	6	4	15	160	135	102
3	(Russia) Dynamo Moscow	56	28	2	3	4	3	16	166	151	101
4	(Russia) Atlant Moscow Oblast	56	24	4	9	1	2	16	173	137	101
5	(Russia) Lokomotiv Yaroslavl	56	26	3	2	4	4	17	163	132	96
6	(Russia) Spartak Moscow	56	24	4	4	4	0	20	178	168	92
7	(Russia) CSKA Moscow	56	22	3	5	4	1	21	148	135	87
8	(Latvia) Dinamo Riga	56	23	1	3	4	3	22	174	175	84
9	(Russia) Torpedo Nizhny Novgorod	56	22	1	1	1	4	27	154	163	75
10	(Russia) Severstal Cherepovets	56	16	2	7	6	2	23	151	162	74
11	(Belarus) Dinamo Minsk	56	17	1	5	2	0	31	139	164	65
12	(Russia) Vityaz Chekhov	56	13	3	2	2	3	33^{1}	142^{1}	216^{1}	54^{1}

Rank	Eastern Conference	GP	W	OTW	SOW	SOL	OTL	L	GF	GA	Pts
1	(Russia) Salavat Yulaev Ufa	56	37	4	3	3	1	8	215	116	129
2	(Russia) Metallurg Magnitogorsk	56	34	2	4	1	0	15	167	111	115
3	(Russia) Ak Bars Kazan	56	25	4	4	3	2	18	159	128	96
4	(Russia) Neftekhimik Nizhnekamsk	56	27	3	1	4	0	21	176	166	93
5	(Russia) Avangard Omsk	56	24	2	2	6	4	18^{1}	152^{1}	128^{1}	90^{1}
6	(Kazakhstan) Barys Astana	56	20	5	1	6	1	23	169	173	79
7	(Russia) Traktor Chelyabinsk	56	18	0	3	2	2	31	137	192	64
8	(Russia) Avtomobilist Yekaterinburg	56	14	2	6	2	4	28	127	159	64
9	(Russia) Sibir Novosibirsk	56	15	2	5	3	1	30	147	190	63
10	(Russia) Amur Khabarovsk	56	12	3	6	4	2	29	129	187	60
11	(Russia) Lada Togliatti	56	14	0	2	6	3	31	115	173	55
12	(Russia) Metallurg Novokuznetsk	56	13	1	2	2	5	33	105	159	52

^{1} The KHL decided that as a result of the game between Vityaz Chekhov and Avangard Omsk on 9 January 2010 being abandoned due to a mass brawl which left neither team having the required number of players to continue, the game counted as a 5–0 defeat for both teams with no points being awarded.

=== Divisional standings ===
Western Conference

DR	CR	Bobrov Division	GP	W	OTW	SOW	SOL	OTL	L	GF	GA	Pts
1	1	(Russia) SKA Saint Petersburg	56	36	1	3	3	3	10	192	118	122
2	3	(Russia) Dynamo Moscow	56	28	2	3	4	3	16	166	151	101
3	6	(Russia) HC Spartak Moscow	56	24	4	4	4	0	20	178	168	92
4	7	(Russia) CSKA Moscow	56	22	3	5	4	1	21	148	135	87
5	8	(Latvia) Dinamo Riga	56	23	1	3	4	3	22	174	175	84
6	11	(Belarus) Dinamo Minsk	56	17	1	5	2	0	31	139	164	65

DR	CR	Tarasov Division	GP	W	OTW	SOW	SOL	OTL	L	GF	GA	Pts
1	2	(Russia) HC MVD	56	30	1	0	6	4	15	160	135	102
2	4	(Russia) Atlant Moscow Oblast	56	24	4	9	1	2	16	173	137	101
3	5	(Russia) Lokomotiv Yaroslavl	56	26	3	2	4	4	17	163	132	96
4	3	(Russia) Torpedo Nizhny Novgorod	56	22	1	1	1	4	27	154	163	75
5	3	(Russia) Severstal Cherepovets	56	16	2	7	6	2	23	151	162	74
6	12	(Russia) Vityaz Chekhov	56	13	3	2	2	3	33	142	216	54

Eastern Conference

DR	CR	Kharlamov Division	GP	W	OTW	SOW	SOL	OTL	L	GF	GA	Pts
1	2	(Russia) Metallurg Magnitogorsk	56	34	2	4	1	0	15	167	111	115
2	3	(Russia) Ak Bars Kazan	56	25	4	4	3	2	18	159	128	96
3	4	(Russia) Neftekhimik Nizhnekamsk	56	27	3	1	4	0	21	176	166	93
4	7	(Russia) Traktor Chelyabinsk	56	18	0	3	2	2	31	137	192	64
5	8	(Russia) Avtomobilist Yekaterinburg	56	14	2	6	2	4	28	127	159	64
6	11	(Russia) Lada Togliatti	56	14	0	2	6	3	31	115	173	55

DR	CR	Chernyshev Division	GP	W	OTW	SOW	SOL	OTL	L	GF	GA	Pts
1	1	(Russia) Salavat Yulaev Ufa	56	37	4	3	3	1	8	215	116	129
2	5	(Russia) Avangard Omsk	56	24	2	2	6	4	18	152	128	90
3	6	(Kazakhstan) Barys Astana	56	20	5	1	6	1	23	169	173	79
4	9	(Russia) Sibir Novosibirsk	56	15	2	5	3	1	30	147	190	63
5	10	(Russia) Amur Khabarovsk	56	12	3	6	4	2	29	129	187	60
6	12	(Russia) Metallurg Novokuznetsk	56	13	1	2	2	5	33	105	159	52

=== League leaders ===
Source: khl.ru

Goals	(Slovakia) Marcel Hossa (Riga)	35
Assists	(Russia) Alexei Yashin (SKA)	46
Points	(Russia) Sergei Mozyakin (Atlant)	66
Shots on goal	(Slovakia) Marcel Hossa (Riga)	216
Plus–minus	(Norway) Patrick Thoresen (Ufa)	+45
Penalty minutes	(Canada) Darcy Verot (Chekhov)	374
Wins (Goaltenders)	(United States) Robert Esche (SKA)	29
Goals against average	(Finland) Petri Vehanen (Kazan)	1.73
Save percentage	(Finland) Petri Vehanen (Kazan)	93.5
Shutouts	(Russia) Vasily Koshechkin (Magnitogorsk)	8

Goaltenders: minimum 20 games played

==== Scoring leaders ====
Source: khl.ru

GP = Games played; G = Goals; A = Assists; Pts = Points; +/– = P Plus–minus; PIM = Penalty minutes

Player	Team	GP	G	A	Pts	+/–	PIM
(Russia) Sergei Mozyakin	Atlant Moscow Oblast	56	27	39	66	+24	44
(Russia) Maxim Sushinski	SKA Saint Petersburg	56	27	38	65	+28	87
(Russia) Alexei Yashin	SKA Saint Petersburg	56	18	46	64	+21	38
(Russia) Alexander Radulov	Salavat Yulaev Ufa	54	24	39	63	+44	62
(Sweden) Mattias Weinhandl	Dynamo Moscow	56	26	34	60	+10	36
(Norway) Patrick Thoresen	Salavat Yulaev Ufa	56	24	33	57	+45	71
(Slovakia) Marcel Hossa	Dinamo Riga	56	35	19	54	–3	44
(Czech Republic) Jiří Hudler	Dynamo Moscow	54	19	35	54	+7	115
(Slovakia) Branko Radivojevič	Spartak Moscow	56	18	36	54	–4	18
(Russia) Sergei Zinovjev	Salavat Yulaev Ufa	47	17	36	53	+24	83

==== Leading goaltenders ====
Source: khl.ru

GP = Games played; Min = Minutes played; W = Wins; L = Losses; SOL = Shootout losses; GA = Goals against; SO = Shutouts; SV% = Save percentage; GAA = Goals against average

Player	Team	GP	Min	W	L	SOL	GA	SO	SV%	GAA
(Finland) Petri Vehanen	Ak Bars Kazan	25	1528:58	15	5	5	44	3	.935	1.73
(Russia) Alexander Yeremenko	Salavat Yulaev Ufa	32	1769:55	24	5	0	52	2	.931	1.76
(Russia) Ilya Proskuryakov	Metallurg Magnitogorsk	32	1809:31	19	8	4	58	4	.927	1.92
(Russia) Vasily Koshechkin	Metallurg Magnitogorsk	49	2840:43	25	16	8	93	8	.933	1.96
(Canada) Michael Garnett	HC MVD	44	2561:54	24	15	4	88	5	.917	2.06

== Playoffs ==
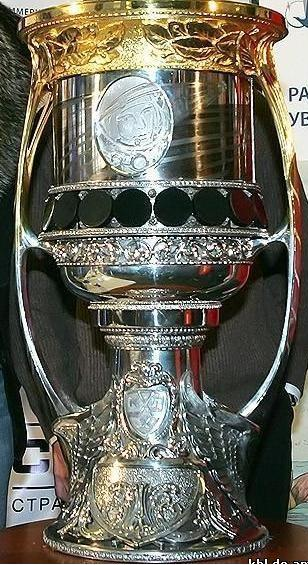
The Gagarin Cup

The eight best teams of each conference qualified for the playoffs. The first three rounds are played within the conferences, then the two winners will play in the Gagarin Cup final. The playoffs started on 10 March 2010 and ended on 27 April with the seventh game of the Gagarin Cup final. Remarkably, each of all the fifteen play-off series was won by the team which won the first game in the series.

Conference Quarterfinals	Conference Semifinals
1	(Russia) Salavat Yulaev	3
8	(Russia) Avtomobilist	1
1	(Russia) Salavat Yulaev	4
4	(Russia) Neftekhimik	2
2	(Russia) Metallurg Mg	3
7	(Russia) Traktor	1
Eastern Conference
3	(Russia) Ak Bars	3
6	(Kazakhstan) Barys	0
2	(Russia) Metallurg Mg	2
3	(Russia) Ak Bars	4
4	(Russia) Neftekhimik	3
5	(Russia) Avangard	0
1	(Russia) SKA	1
8	(Latvia) Dinamo Riga	3
2	(Russia) HC MVD	4
8	(Latvia) Dinamo Riga	1
2	(Russia) HC MVD	3
7	(Russia) CSKA	0
Western Conference
3	(Russia) Dynamo Moscow	1
6	(Russia) Spartak	3
5	(Russia) Lokomotiv	4
6	(Russia) Spartak	2
4	(Russia) Atlant	1
5	(Russia) Lokomotiv	3

Conference Finals
1	(Russia) Salavat Yulaev	2
3	(Russia) Ak Bars	4
2	(Russia) HC MVD	4
5	(Russia) Lokomotiv	3

Gagarin Cup Finals
E	(Russia) Ak Bars	4
W	(Russia) HC MVD	3

=== Playoff leaders ===
Source: khl.ru

Goals	(Belarus) Alexei Ugarov (Balashikha)	9
Assists	(Russia) Alexander Radulov (Ufa) (Russia) Alexei Tsvetkov (Balashikha)	11
Points	(Russia) Alexander Radulov (Ufa)	19
Shots on goal	(Slovakia) Martin Štrbák (Balashikha)	63
Plus–minus	(Czech Republic) Josef Vašíček (Yarsolavl)	+15
Penalty minutes	(Russia) Dmitri Kalinin (Ufa)	58
Wins (Goaltenders)	(Finland) Petri Vehanen (Kazan)	15
Goals against average	(Russia) Ivan Kasutin (Nizhnekamsk)	1.36
Save percentage	(Russia) Ivan Kasutin (Nizhnekamsk)	95.5
Shutouts	(Russia) Ivan Kasutin (Nizhnekamsk) (Finland) Petri Vehanen (Kazan) (Germany) Dimitri Kotschnew (Moscow)	2

Goaltenders: minimum 5 games played

==== Scoring leaders ====
Source: khl.ru

GP = Games played; G = Goals; A = Assists; Pts = Points; +/– = P Plus–minus; PIM = Penalty minutes

Player	Team	GP	G	A	Pts	+/–	PIM
(Russia) Alexander Radulov	Salavat Yulaev Ufa	16	8	11	19	+7	10
(Finland) Niko Kapanen	Ak Bars Kazan	22	8	9	17	+3	6
(Russia) Alexei Tsvetkov	HC MVD	22	5	11	16	+6	14
(Russia) Alexander Galimov	Lokomotiv Yaroslavl	16	8	6	14	+4	33
(Norway) Patrick Thoresen	Salavat Yulaev Ufa	15	5	9	14	+3	37

==== Leading goaltenders ====
Source: khl.ru

GP = Games played; Min = Minutes played; W = Wins; L = Losses; GA = Goals against; SO = Shutouts; SV% = Save percentage; GAA = Goals against average

Player	Team	GP	Min	W	L	GA	SO	SV%	GAA
(Russia) Ivan Kasutin	Neftekhimik Nizhnekamsk	9	528:58	5	4	12	2	.954	1.36
(Finland) Petri Vehanen	Ak Bars Kazan	22	1388:40	15	7	37	2	.937	1.60
(Russia) Alexander Eremenko	Salavat Yulaev Ufa	12	725:34	8	4	52	1	.934	1.65
(Russia) Georgi Gelashvili	Lokomotiv Yaroslavl	17	1050:13	10	6	33	1	.933	1.89
(Latvia) Edgars Masaļskis	Dinamo Riga	6	373:30	3	2	12	1	.934	1.93

== Final standings ==
Rank	Team
1	(Russia) Ak Bars Kazan
2	(Russia) HC MVD
3	(Russia) Salavat Yulaev Ufa
4	(Russia) Lokomotiv Yaroslavl
5	(Russia) Metallurg Magnitogorsk
6	(Russia) Neftekhimik Nizhnekamsk
7	(Russia) Spartak Moscow
8	(Latvia) Dinamo Riga
9	(Russia) SKA Saint Petersburg
10	(Russia) Dynamo Moscow
11	(Russia) Atlant Mytishchi
12	(Russia) Avangard Omsk
13	(Russia) CSKA Moscow
14	(Kazakhstan) Barys Astana
15	(Russia) Traktor Chelyabinsk
16	(Russia) Avtomobilist Yekaterinburg
17	(Russia) Torpedo Nizhny Novgorod
18	(Russia) Severstal Cherepovets
19	(Belarus) Dinamo Minsk
20	(Russia) Sibir Novosibirsk
21	(Russia) Amur Khabarovsk
22	(Russia) Lada Togliatti
23	(Russia) Vityaz Chekhov
24	(Russia) Metallurg Novokuznetsk

== Awards ==
=== Players of the Month ===
Best KHL players of each month.

Month	Goaltender	Defense	Forward	Rookie
September	(Russia) Ilya Proskuryakov (Magnitogorsk)	(Russia) Konstantin Korneyev (CSKA)	(Russia) Kirill Knyazev (Spartak)	(Russia) Sergei Belokon (Vityaz)
October	(Finland) Karri Rämö (Omsk)	(Russia) Dmitri Kalinin (Ufa)	(Sweden) Mattias Weinhandl (Dynamo M)	(Sweden) Linus Omark (Dynamo M)
November	(Russia) Georgi Gelashvili (Yaroslavl)	(Russia) Sergei Zubov (SKA)	(Russia) Maxim Sushinsky (SKA)	(Russia) Nikita Filatov (CSKA)
December	(Kazakhstan) Vitaliy Yeremeyev (Dynamo M)	(Russia) Dmitri Bykov (Atlant)	(Russia) Sergei Mozyakin (Atlant)	(Russia) Nikolai Belov (Neftekhimik)
January	(United States) Robert Esche (SKA)	(Russia) Sergei Zubov (SKA)	(Canada) Geoff Platt (Minsk)	(Russia) Alexander Komaristy (Chekhov)
February	Olympic break			
March	(Russia) Ivan Kasutin (Neftekhimik)	(Russia) Alexander Guskov (Yaroslavl)	(Russia) Alexander Radulov (Ufa)	(Russia) Konstantin Plaksin (Traktor)
April	(Finland) Petri Vehanen (Kazan)	(Russia) Ilya Nikulin (Kazan)	(Russia) Alexei Tsvetkov (HC MVD)	not awarded

=== KHL Awards ===
On 25 May 2010, the KHL held their annual award ceremony. A total of 20 different awards were handed out to teams, players, officials and media. The most important trophies are listed in the table below.

Golden Stick Award (regular season MVP)	(Russia) Alexander Radulov (Ufa)
Play-off Master Award (play-off MVP)	(Russia) Ilya Nikulin (Kazan)
Alexei Cherepanov Award (best rookie)	(Russia) Anatoli Nikontsev (Yekaterinburg)

The league also awarded six "Golden Helmets" for the members of the all-star team:

Forwards	(Russia) Alexander Radulov; Salavat Yulaev Ufa	(Slovakia) Marcel Hossa; Dinamo Riga	(Russia) Sergei Mozyakin; Atlant Moscow Oblast
Defense	(Russia) Sergei Zubov; SKA St. Petersburg		(Russia) Dmitri Kalinin; Salavat Yulaev Ufa
Goalie	(Canada) Michael Garnett; HC MVD		
