= 2010–11 KHL season =

- League: Kontinental Hockey League
- Sport: Ice hockey
- Duration: 8 September 2010 – 16 April 2011
- Teams: 23

Regular season
- Continental Cup winner: (Russia) Avangard Omsk
- Season MVP: (Russia) Alexander Radulov; Salavat Yulaev Ufa
- Top scorer: (Russia) Alexander Radulov; Salavat Yulaev Ufa

Playoffs
- Western champions: (Russia) Atlant Moscow Oblast
- Western runners-up: (Russia) Lokomotiv Yaroslavl
- Eastern champions: (Russia) Salavat Yulaev Ufa
- Eastern runners-up: (Russia) Metallurg Magnitogorsk

Gagarin Cup
- Champions: (Russia) Salavat Yulaev Ufa
- Runners-up: (Russia) Atlant Moscow Oblast
- Finals MVP: (Russia) Konstantin Barulin; Atlant Moscow Oblast

KHL seasons
- ← 2009–10 2011–12 →

The 2010–11 KHL season was the third season of the Kontinental Hockey League. It was held from 8 September 2010 and ended on 16 April 2011.

The season started with the Opening Cup game between the last season's finalists, Ak Bars Kazan and UHC Dynamo, the new team that was created by merging last season's Western conference winner HC MVD with Dynamo Moscow.

Salavat Yulaev Ufa won the Gagarin Cup and the Russian Championship after beating Atlant Moscow Oblast 4–1 in the play-off final series.

== League changes ==
=== Team changes ===
Folding of Lada Togliatti

Lada Togliatti dropped out of the league and joined the Russian Major League instead, after failing to meet the league's financial requirements.

Merger of HC MVD and Dynamo Moscow

On 30 April 2010, it was announced that HC MVD would merge with Dynamo Moscow to form UHC Dynamo, which for the time being will play the majority of their games at Megasport Arena in Moscow, while also attempting to play some games in Balashikha. The current plan is to have a new, large and modernized arena constructed in Balashikha by 2012.

Expansion teams

By the deadline of 1 April 2010, six new teams from four different countries applied for KHL membership for this season: HC Yugra, Krylya Sovetov Moscow and Gazovik Tyumen from Russia; HC Budivelnyk from Kyiv, Ukraine; HC Lev from Hradec Králové, Czech Republic; and Vėtra Vilnius from Lithuania. Of these teams, Budivelnyk and Yugra were initially accepted into the KHL, but on 24 June 2010 Budivelnyk announced it is unable to participate in the KHL in the 2010–11 season because their stadium is not ready. On 16 July 2010, HC Lev, which in the meantime has been moved to Poprad in Slovakia, was accepted into the KHL, but after the Slovak Hockey Federation's delay to give permit to the team, the KHL excluded Lev from the 2010–11 season.

=== Other changes ===
Play-off format

Unlike in the previous seasons, all play-off series were played in a best-of-seven format.

Vuvuzelas ban

The KHL administration has explicitly banned the sale and use of vuvuzelas, infamous since the 2010 FIFA World Cup, in ice hockey arenas.

== Regular season ==
The regular season started on 8 September 2010 with the Opening Cup and ended on 20 February 2011. There were short breaks in November, December and February for international matches and for the all-star game. Each team played 54 games during the regular season.

=== Notable events ===
Opening Cup

The first game of the season is traditionally the "Opening Cup" and is played between the two Gagarin Cup finalists from the previous season. Because previous season's runner-up HC MVD merged with Dynamo Moscow, the Opening Cup was played between defending champion Ak Bars Kazan and the newly formed UHC Dynamo. The game took place on 8 September 2010 at the TatNeft Arena in Kazan where UHC Dynamo beat Ak Bars Kazan 3–1.

KHL versus NHL exhibition games

The Carolina Hurricanes played SKA Saint Petersburg at the Ice Palace Saint Petersburg in Saint Petersburg, Russia on October 4 (SKA won 5–3), and the Phoenix Coyotes played Dinamo Riga at Arena Riga in Riga, Latvia on October 6 (Riga lost 1–3).

Game in Switzerland

On 23 December 2010, before the Spengler Cup started, the two participants from the KHL, SKA Saint Petersburg and Spartak Moscow, played an official regular-season game in the Vaillant Arena in Davos, Switzerland. It was the first KHL game played in central Europe.

All-Star Game

The All-Star weekend took place on 5 and 6 February 2011 in Saint Petersburg.

=== League standings ===
Source: KHL.ru

Points were awarded as follows:

- 3 Points for a win in regulation ("W")
- 2 Points for a win in overtime ("OTW") or penalty shootout ("SOW")
- 1 Point for a loss in a penalty shootout ("SOL") or overtime ("OTL")
- 0 Points for a loss in regulation ("L")

Division winner
Qualified for playoffs

=== Conference standings ===
The conference standings determined the seedings for the play-offs. The first two places in each conference were reserved for the division winners.

Western Conference	GP	W	OTW	SOW	SOL	OTL	L	GF	GA	Pts
(Russia) Lokomotiv Yaroslavl	54	33	1	1	4	1	14	203	143	108
(Russia) UHC Dynamo	54	28	1	1	4	4	16	149	131	96
(Russia) SKA Saint Petersburg	54	23	3	6	5	4	13	171	144	96
(Russia) Atlant Moscow Oblast	54	21	4	7	4	2	16	138	115	91
(Russia) Severstal Cherepovets	54	25	2	3	0	4	20	145	142	89
(Russia) Spartak Moscow	54	24	1	1	3	3	22	129	142	82
(Latvia) Dinamo Riga	54	20	2	5	5	2	20	160	149	81
(Belarus) Dinamo Minsk	54	17	3	5	5	2	22	150	155	74
(Russia) Torpedo Nizhny Novgorod	54	18	5	3	1	2	25	144	151	73
(Russia) CSKA Moscow	54	13	0	7	4	2	28	136	169	59
(Russia) Vityaz Chekhov	54	13	1	3	3	2	32	119	178	52

Source: khl.ru

Eastern Conference	GP	W	OTW	SOW	SOL	OTL	L	GF	GA	Pts
(Russia) Avangard Omsk	54	31	9	2	2	1	9	176	120	118
(Russia) Ak Bars Kazan	54	29	2	3	5	3	12	181	133	105
(Russia) Salavat Yulaev Ufa	54	29	5	4	4	0	12	210	144	109
(Russia) Metallurg Magnitogorsk	54	27	1	5	3	4	14	167	141	100
(Russia) Yugra Khanty-Mansiysk	54	22	0	6	6	3	17	145	151	87
(Russia) HC Sibir Novosibirsk	54	22	2	4	1	4	21	133	131	83
(Kazakhstan) Barys Astana	54	20	2	2	6	3	21	155	152	77
(Russia) Neftekhimik Nizhnekamsk	54	22	1	2	1	2	26	159	162	75
(Russia) Traktor Chelyabinsk	54	14	6	2	5	1	26	142	166	64
(Russia) Avtomobilist Yekaterinburg	54	10	6	4	2	1	31	134	184	53
(Russia) Amur Khabarovsk	54	13	1	1	3	4	32	112	173	50
(Russia) Metallurg Novokuznetsk	54	8	1	3	4	5	33	105	186	41

Source: khl.ru

=== Divisional standings ===
Western Conference

Bobrov Division	GP	W	OTW	SOW	SOL	OTL	L	GF	GA	Pts
(Russia) UHC Dynamo	54	28	1	1	4	4	16	149	131	96
(Russia) SKA Saint Petersburg	54	23	3	6	5	4	13	171	144	96
(Russia) Spartak Moscow	54	24	1	1	3	3	22	129	142	82
(Latvia) Dinamo Riga	54	20	2	5	5	2	20	160	149	81
(Russia) CSKA Moscow	54	13	0	7	4	2	28	136	169	59

Tarasov Division	GP	W	OTW	SOW	SOL	OTL	L	GF	GA	Pts
(Russia) Lokomotiv Yaroslavl	54	33	1	1	4	1	14	203	143	108
(Russia) Atlant Moscow Oblast	54	21	4	7	4	2	16	138	115	91
(Russia) Severstal Cherepovets	54	25	2	3	0	4	20	145	142	89
(Belarus) Dinamo Minsk	54	17	3	5	5	2	22	150	155	74
(Russia) Torpedo Nizhny Novgorod	54	18	5	3	1	2	25	144	151	73
(Russia) Vityaz Chekhov	54	13	1	3	3	2	32	119	178	52

Eastern Conference

Kharlamov Division	GP	W	OTW	SOW	SOL	OTL	L	GF	GA	Pts
(Russia) Ak Bars Kazan	54	29	2	3	5	3	12	181	133	105
(Russia) Metallurg Magnitogorsk	54	27	1	5	3	4	14	167	141	100
(Russia) Yugra Khanty-Mansiysk	54	22	0	6	6	3	17	145	151	87
(Russia) Neftekhimik Nizhnekamsk	54	22	1	2	1	2	26	159	162	75
(Russia) Traktor Chelyabinsk	54	14	6	2	5	1	26	142	166	64
(Russia) Avtomobilist Yekaterinburg	54	10	6	4	2	1	31	134	184	53

Chernyshev Division	GP	W	OTW	SOW	SOL	OTL	L	GF	GA	Pts
(Russia) Avangard Omsk	54	31	9	2	2	1	9	176	120	118
(Russia) Salavat Yulaev Ufa	54	29	5	4	4	0	12	210	144	109
(Russia) Sibir Novosibirsk	54	22	2	4	1	4	21	133	131	83
(Kazakhstan) Barys Astana	54	20	2	2	6	3	21	155	152	77
(Russia) Amur Khabarovsk	54	13	1	1	3	4	32	112	173	50
(Russia) Metallurg Novokuznetsk	54	8	1	3	4	5	33	105	186	41

=== League leaders ===
Source: khl.ru

Goals	(Czech Republic) Roman Červenka (Omsk)	31
Assists	(Russia) Alexander Radulov (Ufa)	60
Points	(Russia) Alexander Radulov (Ufa)	80
Shots	(Canada) Kevin Dallman (Astana)	225
Plus–minus	(Russia) Alexei Morozov (Kazan)	+27
Penalty minutes	(Canada) Darcy Verot (Chekhov)	182
Wins (Goaltenders)	(Finland) Karri Rämö (Omsk)	33
Goals against average	(Russia) Konstantin Barulin (Mytischi)	1.91
Save percentage	(Kazakhstan) Vitali Yeremeyev (Astana)	92.7
Shutouts	(Czech Republic) Dominik Hašek (Moscow)	7

Goaltenders: minimum 15 games played

==== Scoring leaders ====
Source: khl.ru

GP = Games played; G = Goals; A = Assists; Pts = Points; +/– = P Plus–minus; PIM = Penalty minutes

Player	Team	GP	G	A	Pts	+/–	PIM
(Russia) Alexander Radulov	Salavat Yulaev Ufa	54	20	60	80	+27	83
(Norway) Patrick Thoresen	Salavat Yulaev Ufa	54	29	36	65	+21	30
(Czech Republic) Roman Červenka	Avangard Omsk	51	31	30	61	+15	56
(Russia) Sergei Mozyakin	Atlant Moscow Oblast	54	27	34	61	+10	12
(Slovakia) Pavol Demitra	Lokomotiv Yaroslavl	54	18	43	61	+12	29
(Russia) Aleksey Morozov	Ak Bars Kazan	53	21	35	56	+27	24
(Czech Republic) Josef Vašíček	Lokomotiv Yaroslavl	54	24	31	55	+16	34
(Czech Republic) Jaromír Jágr	Avangard Omsk	49	19	32	51	+6	48
(Canada) Matt Ellison	Torpedo Nizhny Novgorod	53	21	29	50	–6	28
(Sweden) Mattias Weinhandl	SKA Saint Petersburg	54	21	28	49	+14	42

==== Leading goaltenders ====
Source: khl.ru

GP = Games played; Min = Minutes played; W = Wins; L = Losses; SOL = Shootout losses; GA = Goals against; SO = Shutouts; SV% = Save percentage; GAA = Goals against average

Player	Team	GP	Min	W	L	SOL	GA	SO	SV%	GAA
(Russia) Konstantin Barulin	Atlant Moscow Oblast	28	1504:47	13	9	4	48	6	.925	1.91
(Finland) Karri Rämö	Avangard Omsk	44	2592:49	33	6	4	85	5	.925	1.97
(Czech Republic) Jakub Štěpánek	SKA Saint Petersburg	32	1844:06	16	8	5	63	3	.923	2.05
(Belarus) Vitali Koval	Atlant Moscow Oblast	34	1766:55	12	10	9	61	2	.921	2.07
(Finland) Petri Vehanen	Ak Bars Kazan	43	2538:01	25	12	6	89	2	.926	2.10

== Playoffs ==
The playoffs started on 23 February 2011. The fifth and final game of the final series for the Gagarin Cup was played on 16 April 2011.

Conference Quarterfinals	Conference Semifinals
1	(Russia) Avangard	4
8	(Russia) Neftekhimik	3
2	(Russia) Ak Bars	1
3	(Russia) Salavat Yulaev	4
2	(Russia) Ak Bars	4
7	(Kazakhstan) Barys	0
Eastern Conference
3	(Russia) Salavat Yulaev	4
6	(Russia) Sibir	0
1	(Russia) Avangard	3
4	(Russia) Metallurg Mg	4
4	(Russia) Metallurg Mg	4
5	(Russia) Yugra	2
1	(Russia) Lokomotiv	4
8	(Belarus) Dinamo Mn	3
1	(Russia) Lokomotiv	4
7	(Latvia) Dinamo Rg	1
2	(Russia) UHC Dynamo	2
7	(Latvia) Dinamo Rg	4
Western Conference
3	(Russia) SKA	4
6	(Russia) Spartak	0
3	(Russia) SKA	3
4	(Russia) Atlant	4
4	(Russia) Atlant	4
5	(Russia) Severstal	2

Conference Finals
3	(Russia) Salavat Yulaev	4
4	(Russia) Metallurg Mg	3
1	(Russia) Lokomotiv	2
4	(Russia) Atlant	4

Gagarin Cup Finals
3	(Russia) Salavat Yulaev	4
4	(Russia) Atlant	1

=== Playoff leaders ===
Source: khl.ru

Goals	(Russia) Gleb Klimenko (Magnitogorsk)	10
Assists	(Czech Republic) Josef Vašíček (Yaroslavl) (Slovakia) Pavol Demitra (Yaroslavl) (Norway) Patrick Thoresen (Ufa) (Russia) Alexander Radulov (Ufa)	15
Points	(Czech Republic) Josef Vašíček (Yaroslavl)	22
Shots	(Russia) Sergey Mozyakin (Mytishchi)	77
Plus–minus	(Norway) Patrick Thoresen (Ufa) (Russia) Ilya Gorokhov (Mytishchi)	+11
Penalty minutes	(Russia) Fedor Fedorov (Mytishchi)	65
Wins (Goaltenders)	(Sweden) Erik Ersberg (Ufa)	15
Goals against average	(Finland) Petri Vehanen (Kazan)	1.32
Save percentage	(Finland) Petri Vehanen (Kazan)	95.7
Shutouts	(Finland) Petri Vehanen (Kazan) (Sweden) Erik Ersberg (Ufa)	3

Goaltenders: minimum 5 games played

==== Scoring leaders ====
Source: khl.ru

GP = Games played; G = Goals; A = Assists; Pts = Points; +/– = P Plus–minus; PIM = Penalty minutes

Player	Team	GP	G	A	Pts	+/–	PIM
(Czech Republic) Josef Vašíček	Lokomotiv Yaroslavl	18	7	15	22	+6	16
(Russia) Sergei Mozyakin	Atlant Moscow Oblast	23	8	13	21	–2	2
(Slovakia) Pavol Demitra	Lokomotiv Yaroslavl	18	6	15	21	+10	4
(Norway) Patrick Thoresen	Salavat Yulaev Ufa	21	3	15	18	+11	16
(Russia) Alexander Radulov	Salavat Yulaev Ufa	21	3	15	18	+10	42

==== Leading goaltenders ====
Source: khl.ru

GP = Games played; Min = Minutes played; W = Wins; L = Losses; SOL = Shootout losses; GA = Goals against; SO = Shutouts; SV% = Save percentage; GAA = Goals against average

Player	Team	GP	Min	W	L	GA	SO	SV%	GAA
(Finland) Petri Vehanen	Ak Bars Kazan	9	543:49	5	4	12	3	.957	1.32
(Sweden) Erik Ersberg	Salavat Yulaev Ufa	20	1118:23	15	3	36	3	.933	1.93
(United States) Robert Esche	Dinamo Minsk	4	215:38	2	2	7	0	.942	1.95
(Russia) Konstantin Barulin	Atlant Moscow Oblast	22	1286:09	11	10	44	2	.928	2.05
(Czech Republic) Jakub Štěpánek	SKA Saint Petersburg	11	698:22	7	4	25	1	.920	2.15

== Final standings ==
Rank	Team
1	(Russia) Salavat Yulaev Ufa
2	(Russia) Atlant Moscow Oblast
3	(Russia) Lokomotiv Yaroslavl
4	(Russia) Metallurg Magnitogorsk
5	(Russia) Avangard Omsk
6	(Russia) Ak Bars Kazan
7	(Russia) SKA Saint Petersburg
8	(Latvia) Dinamo Riga
9	(Russia) Dynamo Moscow
10	(Russia) Severstal Cherepovets
11	(Russia) Yugra Khanty-Mansiysk
12	(Russia) Sibir Novosibirsk
13	(Russia) Spartak Moscow
14	(Kazakhstan) Barys Astana
15	(Russia) Neftekhimik Nizhnekamsk
16	(Belarus) Dinamo Minsk
17	(Russia) Torpedo Nizhny Novgorod
18	(Russia) Traktor Chelyabinsk
19	(Russia) HC CSKA Moscow
20	(Russia) Avtomobilist Yekaterinburg
21	(Russia) Vityaz Chekhov
22	(Russia) Amur Khabarovsk
23	(Russia) Metallurg Novokuznetsk

== Awards ==
=== Players of the Month ===
Best KHL players of each month.

Month	Goaltender	Defense	Forward	Rookie
September	(Austria) Bernd Brückler (Torpedo)	(Latvia) Sandis Ozoliņš (Riga)	(Russia) Denis Platonov (Magnitogorsk)	(Russia) Yaroslav Khabarov (Magnitogorsk)
October	(Russia) Mikhail Biryukov (Khanty-Mansiysk)	(Russia) Maxim Soloviev (Dynamo M)	(Czech Republic) Roman Červenka (Omsk)	(Russia) Aleksandr Osipov (Khabarovsk)
November	(Finland) Karri Rämö (Omsk)	(Sweden) Johan Fransson (St. Petersburg)	(Russia) Sergei Mozyakin (Atlant)	(Russia) Dinar Khafizullin (Chekhov)
December	(Finland) Petri Vehanen (Kazan)	(Russia) Alexander Guskov (Yaroslavl)	(Russia) Sergei Mozyakin (Atlant)	(Russia) Alexander Pankov (Ufa)
January	(Czech Republic) Dominik Hašek (Spartak)	(Canada) Kevin Dallman (Astana)	(Slovakia) Pavol Demitra (Yaroslavl)	(Russia) Grigory Zheldakov (Spartak)
February	(Finland) Petri Vehanen (Kazan)	(Czech Republic) Karel Rachůnek (Yaroslavl)	(Russia) Alexander Radulov (Ufa)	(Belarus) Mikhail Stefanovich (Minsk)
March	(Sweden) Erik Ersberg (Ufa)	(Russia) Marat Kalimulin (Yaroslavl)	(Russia) Gleb Klimenko (Magnitogorsk)	(Russia) Pavel Zdunov (Magnitogorsk)

=== KHL Awards ===
On 20 May 2011, the KHL held their annual award ceremony. A total of 20 different awards were handed out to teams, players, officials and media. The most important trophies are listed in the table below.

Golden Stick Award (regular season MVP)	(Russia) Alexander Radulov (Ufa)
Best coach	(Czech Republic) Miloš Říha (Atlant)
Alexei Cherepanov Award (best rookie)	(Russia) Pavel Zdunov (Magnitogorsk)

The league also awarded six "Golden Helmets" for the members of the all-star team:

Forwards	(Russia) Alexander Radulov; Salavat Yulaev Ufa	(Russia) Igor Grigorenko; Salavat Yulaev Ufa	(Russia) Sergei Mozyakin; Atlant Moscow Oblast
Defense	(Latvia) Sandis Ozoliņš; Dinamo Riga		(Russia) Kirill Koltsov; Salavat Yulaev Ufa
Goalie	(Sweden) Erik Ersberg; Salavat Yulaev Ufa		
