= Pavel Zdunov =

Russian professional ice hockey forward (born 1991)

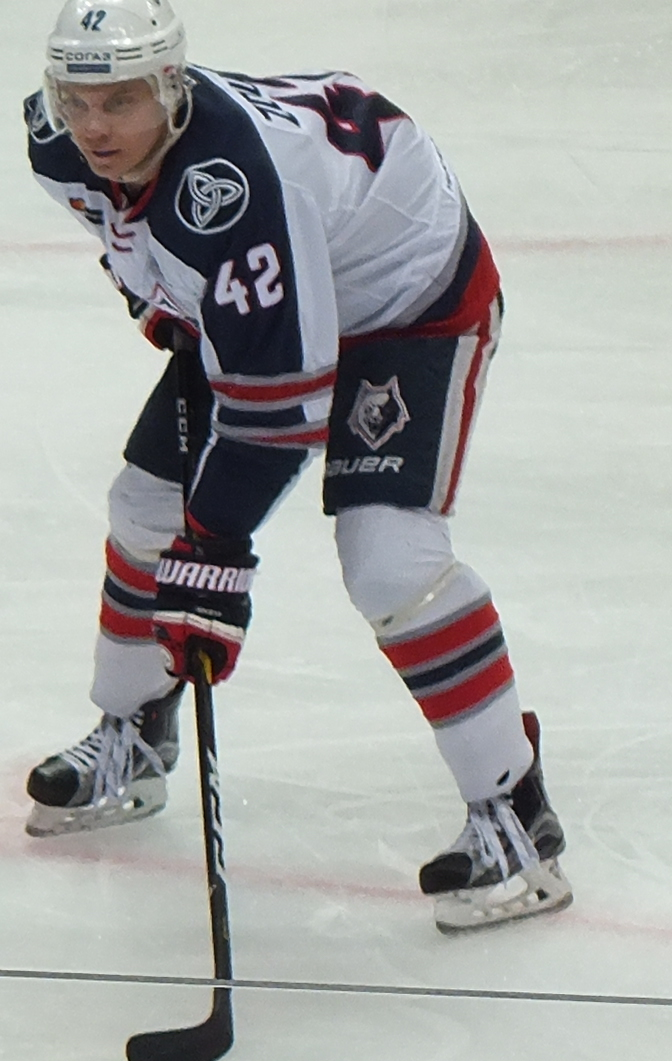
- Born: June 18, 1991 (age 34) Kremenki, Russian SFSR
- Height: 5 ft 11 in (180 cm)
- Weight: 183 lb (83 kg; 13 st 1 lb)
- Position: Forward
- Shot: Left
- VHL team Former teams: Humo Tashkent; Metallurg Magnitogorsk; Neftekhimik Nizhnekamsk
- Playing career: 2010–2023

Pavel Zdunov is a former Russian professional ice hockey forward who played for Humo Tashkent in the Supreme Hockey League (VHL).

== Playing career ==
Zdunov formerly played with Metallurg Magnitogorsk, making his KHL debut in the 2010–11 season. He appeared in an impressive 41 games as a 20-year-old, registering 6 points, before securing a regular role in the post-season, with 3 points in 15 games. Zdunov's season was recognised as he was awarded the Alexei Cherepanov Trophy as the best rookie.

During the 2013–14 season, after making 7 appearances with Magnitogorsk, Zdunov was traded to HC Neftekhimik Nizhnekamsk in exchange for Oskar Osala, on 10 December 2013.

== Career statistics ==
			Regular season					Playoffs
Season	Team	League	GP	G	A	Pts	PIM	GP	G	A	Pts	PIM
2009–10	Stalnye Lisy	MHL	52	28	22	50	54	15	5	3	8	16
2010–11	Stalnye Lisy	MHL	6	0	1	1	0	8	2	0	2	2
2010–11	Metallurg Magnitogorsk	KHL	41	2	4	6	43	15	2	1	3	4
2011–12	Stalnye Lisy	MHL	35	12	15	27	12	8	4	4	8	4
2011–12	Metallurg Magnitogorsk	KHL	8	0	0	0	0	11	2	0	2	0
2011–12	Titan Klin	VHL	11	4	1	5	4	—	—	—	—	—
2012–13	Metallurg Magnitogorsk	KHL	51	4	2	6	33	7	0	0	0	0
2012–13	Stalnye Lisy	MHL	—	—	—	—	—	3	0	2	2	0
2013–14	Metallurg Magnitogorsk	KHL	7	0	0	0	0	—	—	—	—	—
2013–14	Yuzhny Ural Orsk	VHL	2	1	0	1	0	—	—	—	—	—
2013–14	Neftekhimik Nizhnekamsk	KHL	11	2	2	4	18	—	—	—	—	—
2014–15	Neftekhimik Nizhnekamsk	KHL	20	3	2	5	14	—	—	—	—	—
2015–16	Neftekhimik Nizhnekamsk	KHL	49	7	4	11	14	1	0	0	0	0
2016–17	Neftekhimik Nizhnekamsk	KHL	37	2	4	6	24	—	—	—	—	—
2017–18	Neftekhimik Nizhnekamsk	KHL	45	4	3	7	10	5	0	0	0	4
2018–19	Neftekhimik Nizhnekamsk	KHL	53	2	2	4	32	—	—	—	—	—
KHL totals			322	26	23	49	188	39	4	1	5	8

== Awards and honours ==
Award	Year
KHL
Alexei Cherepanov Trophy	2011
