= Semyon Varlamov =

Russian ice hockey player (born 1988)

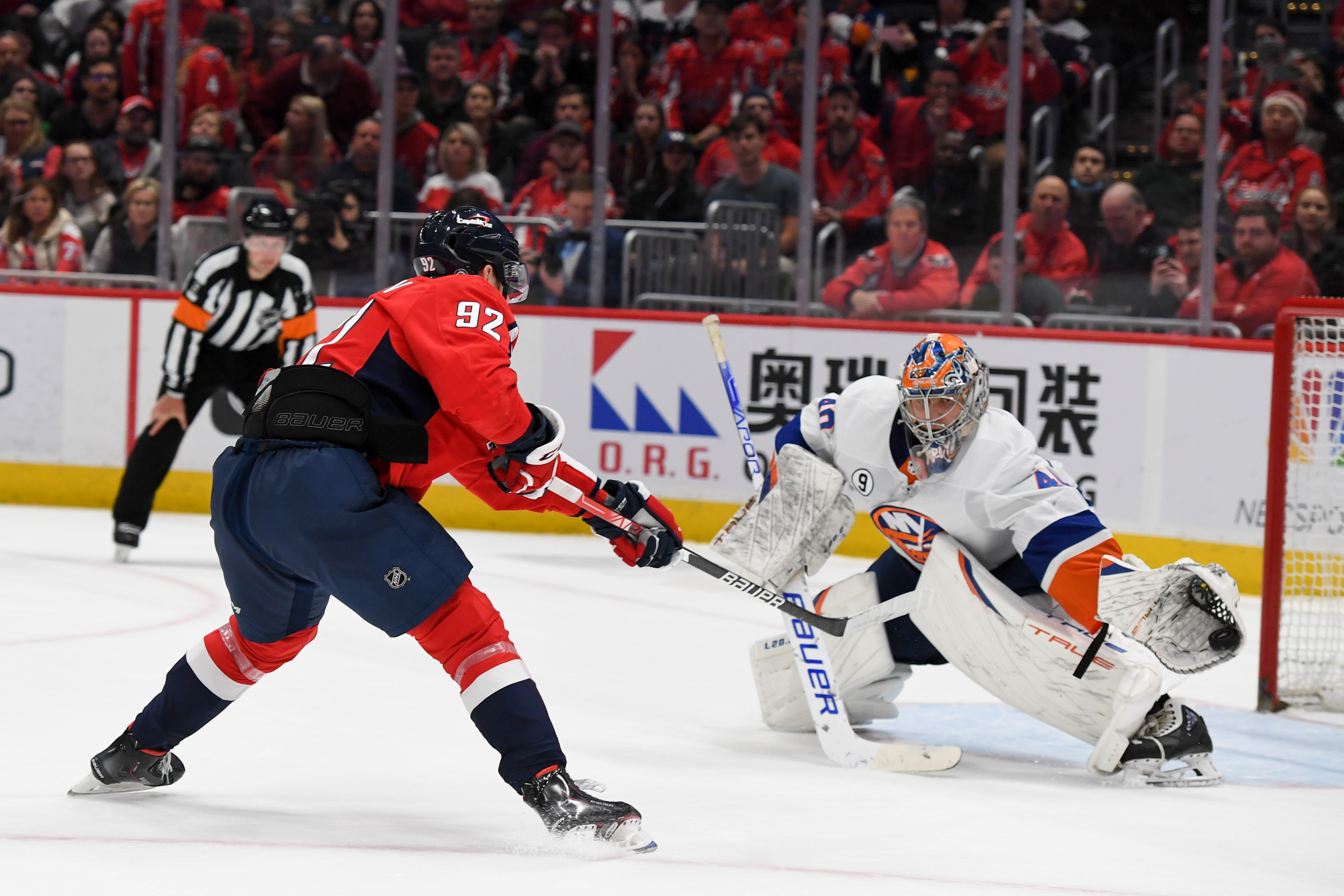
- Varlamov with the New York Islanders in 2022
- Born: 27 April 1988 (age 38) Kuybyshev, Russian SFSR, Soviet Union
- Height: 6 ft 2 in (188 cm)
- Weight: 201 lb (91 kg; 14 st 5 lb)
- Position: Goaltender
- Catches: Left
- NHL team Former teams: New York Islanders; Lokomotiv Yaroslavl; Washington Capitals; Colorado Avalanche
- National team: Russia
- NHL draft: 23rd overall, 2006; Washington Capitals
- Playing career: 2006–present

Semyon Aleksandrovich Varlamov (Russian: Семён Александрович Варламов, IPA: [sʲɪˈmʲɵn vɐrˈlaməf]; born 27 April 1988) is a Russian professional ice hockey player who is a goaltender for the New York Islanders of the National Hockey League (NHL).

He first played professionally with Lokomotiv Yaroslavl of the then Russian Superleague (RSL) after he was drafted in the first round, 23rd overall, by the Washington Capitals in the 2006 NHL entry draft. He would later spend eight NHL seasons with the Colorado Avalanche before signing with the Islanders in the summer of 2019.

== Playing career ==
=== Early career ===
Varlamov grew up in Kuybyshev, developing his skills under the VVS hockey program. Before learning to skate properly, he started playing in net at the age of eight, preferring the goalie stick to the inferior bandy sticks that mite-level players were using at the time. The young goalie moved to Yaroslavl in his early teens and quickly established himself as the club's dominant goalie. During the 2004–05 season, Varlamov made his debut on Lokomotiv's junior farm club, Lokomotiv-2, playing as backup to Ivan Kasutin in the 1st League (Russia 3). During the summer of 2005, Kasutin was loaned to Penza, effectively making Varlamov the starting goalie for the 2005–06 season. In 2008, he helped lead Lokomotiv Yaroslavl to the Russian Super League finals.

=== Washington Capitals ===
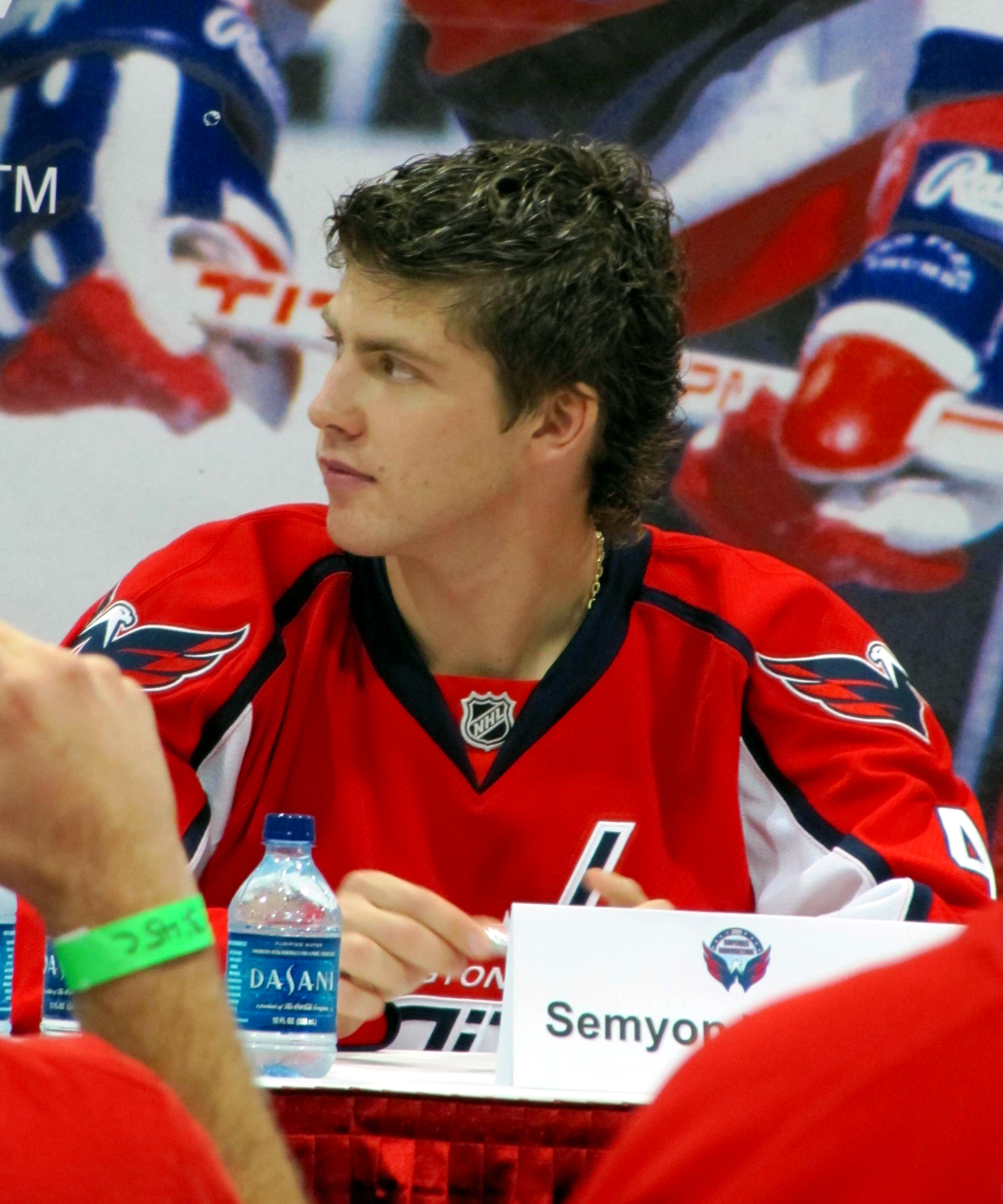
Varlamov at Capitals convention in September 2009

After having been drafted by the Washington Capitals 23rd overall in the 2006 NHL entry draft, Varlamov was signed by the Capitals to a three-year, entry-level contract on 11 July 2007. He came to North America for the 2008–09 season and played, for the most part, with the Capitals' minor league affiliate, the Hershey Bears of the American Hockey League (AHL). Varlamov was called up, however, on several occasions during the season and played his first NHL game on 13 December 2008, against the Montreal Canadiens. Making 32 saves, he won his debut 2–1 and was named the first star of the game. His home debut in Washington came five days later on 18 December against the St. Louis Blues, where he made 29 saves on 31 shots and was named the second star of the game in a 4–2 Capitals win. After regular Capitals backup Brent Johnson was sidelined with a hip injury in February 2009, Varlamov assumed the backup position behind José Théodore. He went 4–0–1 with a 2.37 goals against average (GAA) and .918 save percentage in six games with the Capitals, while also going 19–7–1 in 27 games with the Bears in the AHL.

During the first round of the 2009 playoffs against the New York Rangers, Varlamov replaced José Théodore after he allowed four goals to lose Game 1. He subsequently made his NHL playoff debut on 18 April 2009, losing the second game of the series 1–0. He went on to win Game 3 4–0 on 20 April, recording his first career NHL shutout. On 24 April, Game 5 of the series, Varlamov achieved his second shutout by the same score, 4–0. He won the next two games 5–3 and 2–1, respectively, to help the Washington Capitals advance to the second round of the playoffs for the first time since 1998. In Game 1 of the second round against the Pittsburgh Penguins, Varlamov made a spectacular save on Sidney Crosby that NHL pundits dubbed "the save of the playoffs." In Game 7 of that series, after allowing four early goals, he was pulled in favor of deposed starter José Théodore in which the Capitals were ultimately eliminated 6–2 by the eventual Stanley Cup champions.

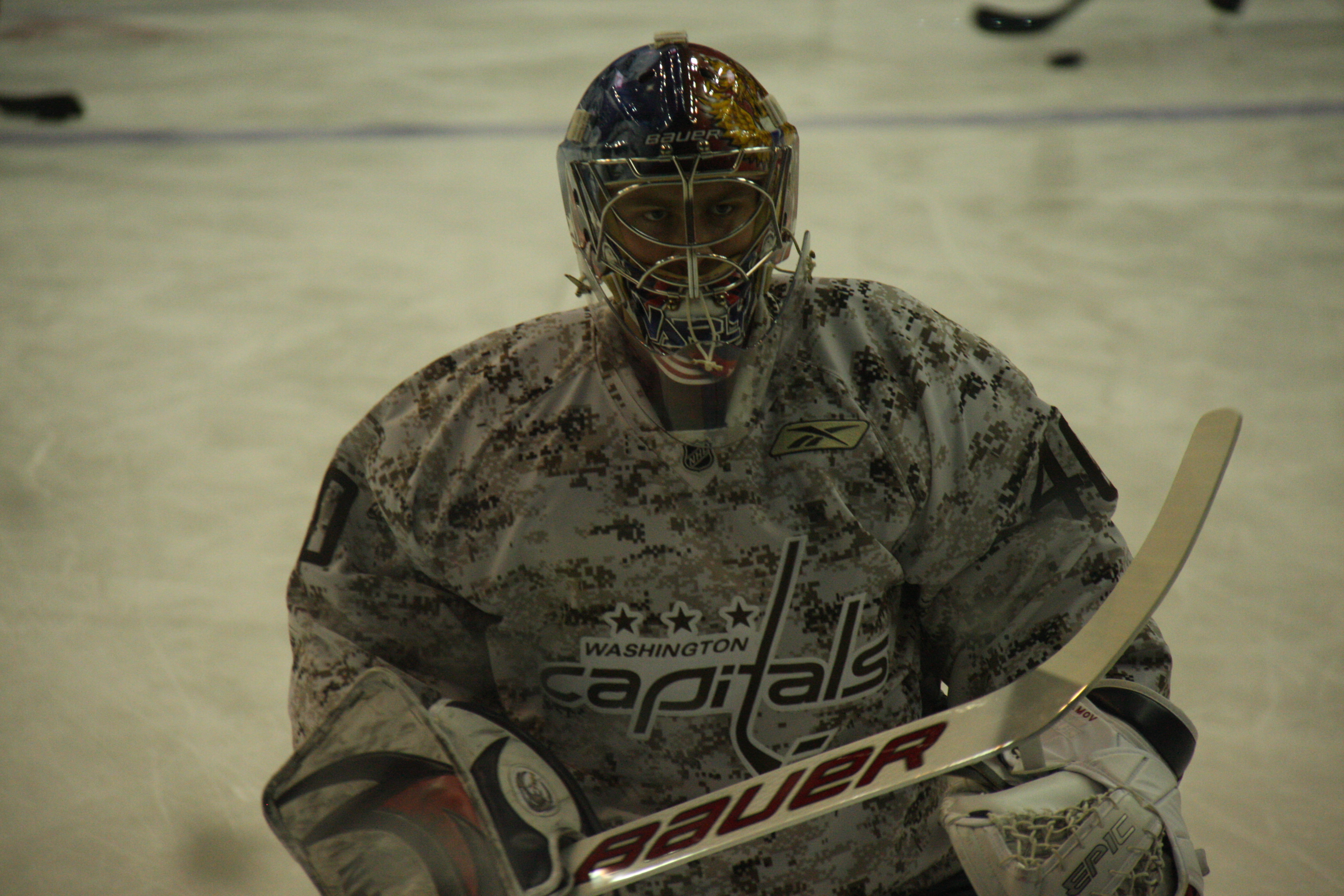
Varlamov with the Capitals in March 2010

The next season, Théodore began the season as the starter, with Varlamov able to challenge for the spot. After a hot start, just as it seemed he would supplant Theodore, Varlamov was injured. Varlamov was sent down to the Hershey Bears of the AHL by the Capitals on 29 December 2009, to begin his rehabilitation starts. Varlamov was later recalled from the Bears on 1 March 2010. Théodore remained the starter, but just as it was the year before, Varlamov made most of the playoff starts. Théodore was not retained after the season, seemingly making Varlamov the official starter. However, he eventually lost out to rookie Michal Neuvirth, and Neuvirth was instead Théodore's successor. On 9 July 2010, it was announced that Varlamov changed his jersey number from the recognizable number 40 to number 1.

=== Colorado Avalanche ===
On 1 July 2011, Varlamov was traded to the Colorado Avalanche for a first-round draft pick in the 2012 NHL entry draft and a second-round pick in either 2012 or 2013. As a restricted free agent at the time of his trade, he was then signed to a three-year, $8.5 million contract with the Avalanche the following day, marking his projection as the Avalanche's starting goaltender.

The start of the 2011–12 season proved successful for Varlamov and the Avalanche, but a disastrous November put the club back to the bottom of the Northwest Division. Varlamov was often benched in favor of veteran backup Jean-Sébastien Giguère, originally brought in by the Avalanche to mentor the young Russian. With Giguère's exemplary effort in net, Colorado climbed back within the race for bottom playoff spots in the Western Conference. On 15 February 2012, Giguère pulled his groin in the first period against the Vancouver Canucks. Varlamov replaced Giguère in a losing effort. He soon reaffirmed his position as starter, and kept his club in playoff contention.

On 5 April 2012, the 81st game of the season, in a must-win situation for the Avalanche's playoff hopes, Varlamov made his career-high eighth consecutive start and let up four goals in a 5–2 loss against the last-placed Columbus Blue Jackets at Pepsi Center. Two of the goals came from Columbus captain Rick Nash, the other two from rookie Cam Atkinson, who notched his first career hat-trick with an empty-net goal after Varlamov was pulled in favor of an extra skater at the end of the game. The loss ended Colorado's playoff bid. This game finished his season with a .913 save percentage and a 2.59 GAA with a 26–24–3 record. Despite his well-known contempt for the post-overtime tiebreaker, Varlamov went undefeated in the shootout in the 2011–12 season, winning all eight of his contests and allowing only two goals in 24 attempts.

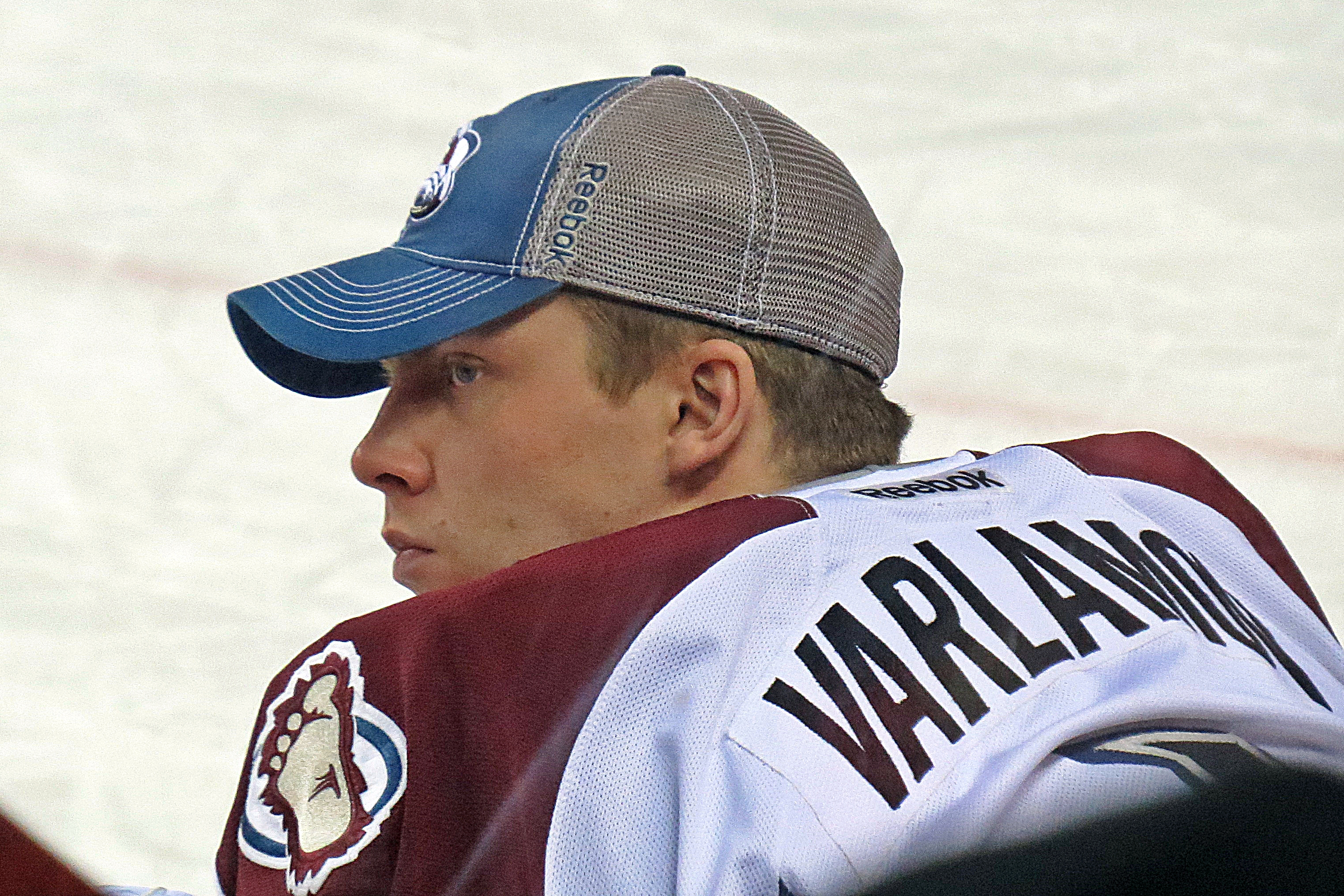
Varlamov with the Avalanche in December 2013

With the 2012–13 NHL lockout cancelling the start of the NHL season, Varlamov signed a lockout contract to return to his Russian club, Lokomotiv Yaroslavl, on 27 September 2012. Used as one of three main goaltenders on the Lokomotiv roster, Varlamov impressed early in his debut Kontinental Hockey League (KHL) season. Despite suffering a knee injury, Varlamov played in 16 games and led the KHL in GAA and save percentage before the conclusion of the NHL lockout called for his return to the Avalanche on 6 January 2013.

Varlamov struggled during the lockout-shortened 2012–13 season, only posting 11 wins in 35 games played and ending the season with a career-worst 3.02 GAA and .903 save percentage as the Avalanche missed the playoffs again and finished last in the Western Conference.

On 30 January 2014, Varlamov signed a five-year contract extension with the Avalanche worth $29.5 million.

On 26 January 2017, it was announced that Varlamov would not return for the 2016–17 season after undergoing hip surgery for what was previously thought to be a groin injury. Varlamov returned for the 2017–18 season but was again injured near the end of the season, allowing for Jonathan Bernier to start for the Avalanche during the 2018 Stanley Cup playoffs.

=== New York Islanders ===
On 1 July 2019, Varlamov signed as a free agent to a four-year contract with the New York Islanders worth $20 million.

He became the first goaltender in Islanders history to record back to back shutouts in the playoffs, after shutting out his former team in the Washington Capitals in Game 5 of the First Round of the 2020 playoffs and then the Philadelphia Flyers in Game 1 of the Second Round. On 26 August 2020, he surpassed Billy Smith for the longest playoff shutout streak in Islanders history.

On 6 February 2021, Varlamov played his 500th NHL game as the Islanders won 4–3 against the Pittsburgh Penguins. On 8 February, Varlamov became the first Islanders goaltender with consecutive shutouts in a season against the New York Rangers. On 1 May, Varlamov broke Chico Resch's record for the longest shutout streak in Islanders history, after shutting out the rival Rangers 3–0.

On 1 July 2023, Varlamov signed a four-year, $11 million contract extension with the Islanders.

On October 6, 2026, Varlamov played in his first regular season game for the Islanders since November 29, 2024 after having undergone double partial knee replacement surgeries. He had played in two games the season prior for the Bridgeport Islanders, the Islanders' AHL affiliate at that time.

On October 27, 2026, Varlamov won his first NHL game in nearly 2 years after the Islanders beat the Nashville Predators 4-3 in a shootout.

== Personal life ==
On 30 October 2013, Varlamov surrendered to Denver police and was arrested on domestic violence charges against his girlfriend, including second degree kidnapping and third degree assault. On 22 November 2013, Varlamov was charged with misdemeanor assault of his girlfriend. The charges were dropped by a Denver judge on 20 December 2013 at the request of prosecutors, who said they could not prove the case beyond a reasonable doubt. Varlamov subsequently filed a civil suit against his girlfriend claiming abuse of process, and was awarded US$126,608 in damages for legal fees in 2016.

Varlamov resides in Lubbock, Texas during the offseason.

=== Name pronunciation ===
When Varlamov first started playing for the Capitals, his name was most often pronounced VAR-la-mov. However, Varlamov has since corrected journalists and the Capitals television team, who mentioned it often during Game 4 of the 2009 Eastern Conference Quarterfinals. The correct pronunciation is var-LA-mov, similar to the syllable emphasis of the last names of fellow Russian netminders Evgeni Nabokov and Ilya Bryzgalov.

On 5 August 2009, Varlamov registered a change of spelling of his first name with the NHL, "for the upcoming season and foreseeable future," from the incorrect "Simeon" to "Semyon." In the Russian alphabet, Varlamov's first name is spelled "Семён." The Russian letter (ё), equates to the sound (yo) in English. Other transliterated variations in use include Semen (as it is written in the NHL 09 video game), Semyen, Simyan, Simyon, etc.

In response to attempts by Varlamov and other Russian players to correct the spellings of their names, the International Ice Hockey Federation (IIHF) came out with a standardized code in 2011 for transliterating names from the Cyrillic to the Latin script.

== International play ==
Medal record

Representing Russia

Ice hockey

World Championships
Gold medal – first place	2012 Helsinki	
Silver medal – second place	2010 Germany	

World Junior Championships
Silver medal – second place	2007 Sweden	
Silver medal – second place	2006 Canada	

Varlamov was a backup for Russia during the 2005 IIHF World U18 Championships, where they finished fifth. He then earned the backup position over Lokomotiv-2 teammate Ivan Kasutin for Russia at the 2006 World Junior Championships as a 17-year-old. Backing up Anton Khudobin, Varlamov did not see much ice time, playing only in one game against Latvia, allowing one goal in a 3–1 round robin win. He earned a silver medal with Russia as they were defeated 5–0 in the final by Canada.

Later that year, Varlamov established himself as the starting netminder for Russia's under-18 squad at the 2006 IIHF World U18 Championships and finished in fifth place. He began the 2007 Super Series as Russia's starter at the under-20 level, but was later pulled in the series in favour of Sergei Bobrovsky. He regained the starting position at the 2007 World Junior Championships and recorded a 1.51 GAA (second among tournament goalies to Carey Price of Canada) along with two shutouts. Russia was, however, defeated by Canada for the second consecutive year in the gold medal game to earn another silver medal.

Varlamov was selected to represent the senior Russian squad for the 2010 Winter Olympics in Vancouver. He was the youngest player on the team by two years, serving as the third-string goaltender on the team, behind starter Evgeni Nabokov and backup Ilya Bryzgalov. Russia's tournament, however, ended as they lost to Canada 7–3 in the quarterfinals. Varlamov did not see any action in the Olympic tournament. Varlamov then represented Russia at the 2010 IIHF World Championship in Germany, where he took the starting goaltender's spot. Varlamov helped the Russians to the World Championships Final, where the team faced the Czech Republic, though Russia lost 2–1, earning the silver medal. In 2012, Varlamov was the starting goaltender for Russia at the 2012 IIHF World Championship. Varlamov played extremely well in Russia's net and was an important piece in the team that reached the World Championships Final, where they faced Slovakia. Russia won the Final 6–2 and won the tournament, receiving the gold medal.

At the 2013 IIHF World Championships, held in Finland and Sweden, Varlamov was Russia's second choice goaltender behind the Philadelphia Flyers' Ilya Bryzgalov, although both would play similar minutes throughout the tournament. Bryzgalov was named the starter against the United States in the quarterfinals, where the U.S. crushed Russia 8–3 and ended their tournament, despite the inclusion of a star-studded roster that included Ilya Kovalchuk and Alexander Ovechkin, among others.

At the 2014 Winter Olympics in Sochi, Varlamov started most of Russia's games, posting a 2–1 record with one shutout. Russia, however, ultimately fell in the quarterfinals to Finland, 3–1, thwarting their attempt at claiming gold on home soil in the Olympics.

== Career statistics ==
=== Regular season and playoffs ===
Bold indicates led league

			Regular season									Playoffs
Season	Team	League	GP	W	L	OTL	MIN	GA	SO	GAA	SV%	GP	W	L	MIN	GA	SO	GAA	SV%
2004–05	Lokomotiv Yaroslavl-2	RUS-3	8	—	—	—	369	15	1	2.43	—	—	—	—	—	—	—	—	—
2005–06	Lokomotiv Yaroslavl-2	RUS-3	33	—	—	—	1,782	60	8	2.02	—	—	—	—	—	—	—	—	—
2006–07	Lokomotiv Yaroslavl	RSL	33	—	—	—	1,936	70	3	2.17	—	6	—	—	368	18	0	2.94	—
2006–07	Lokomotiv Yaroslavl-2	RUS-3	2	—	—	—	120	3	0	1.50	—	—	—	—	—	—	—	—	—
2007–08	Lokomotiv Yaroslavl	RSL	44	—	—	—	2,592	106	3	2.45	—	16	—	—	924	25	5	1.62	—
2008–09	Hershey Bears	AHL	27	19	7	1	1,551	62	2	2.40	.916	—	—	—	—	—	—	—	—
2008–09	Washington Capitals	NHL	6	4	0	1	329	13	0	2.37	.918	13	7	6	758	32	2	2.53	.918
2009–10	Washington Capitals	NHL	26	15	4	6	1,527	65	2	2.55	.909	6	3	3	349	14	0	2.41	.908
2009–10	Hershey Bears	AHL	3	3	0	0	185	6	0	1.95	.933	—	—	—	—	—	—	—	—
2010–11	Washington Capitals	NHL	27	11	9	5	1,560	58	2	2.23	.924	—	—	—	—	—	—	—	—
2010–11	Hershey Bears	AHL	3	2	1	0	179	10	0	3.36	.855	—	—	—	—	—	—	—	—
2011–12	Colorado Avalanche	NHL	53	26	24	3	3,151	136	4	2.59	.913	—	—	—	—	—	—	—	—
2012–13	Lokomotiv Yaroslavl	KHL	16	8	4	3	928	27	3	1.74	.946	—	—	—	—	—	—	—	—
2012–13	Colorado Avalanche	NHL	35	11	21	3	1,950	98	3	3.02	.903	—	—	—	—	—	—	—	—
2013–14	Colorado Avalanche	NHL	63	**41**	14	6	3,640	146	2	2.41	.927	7	3	4	432	20	0	2.78	.913
2014–15	Colorado Avalanche	NHL	57	28	20	8	3,307	141	5	2.56	.921	—	—	—	—	—	—	—	—
2015–16	Colorado Avalanche	NHL	57	27	25	3	3,159	148	2	2.81	.914	—	—	—	—	—	—	—	—
2016–17	Colorado Avalanche	NHL	24	6	17	0	1,348	76	1	3.38	.898	—	—	—	—	—	—	—	—
2017–18	Colorado Avalanche	NHL	51	24	16	6	2,862	128	2	2.68	.920	—	—	—	—	—	—	—	—
2018–19	Colorado Avalanche	NHL	49	20	19	9	2,840	136	2	2.87	.909	—	—	—	—	—	—	—	—
2019–20	New York Islanders	NHL	45	19	14	6	2,518	110	2	2.62	.914	20	11	7	1,233	44	2	2.14	.921
2020–21	New York Islanders	NHL	36	19	11	4	2,117	72	7	2.04	.929	14	7	7	797	34	0	2.56	.922
2021–22	New York Islanders	NHL	31	10	17	2	1,793	87	2	2.91	.911	—	—	—	—	—	—	—	—
2022–23	New York Islanders	NHL	23	11	9	2	1,335	60	2	2.70	.913	—	—	—	—	—	—	—	—
2023–24	New York Islanders	NHL	28	14	8	4	1,595	69	3	2.60	.918	5	1	3	289	13	0	2.70	.914
2024–25	New York Islanders	NHL	10	3	4	3	602	29	0	2.89	.889	—	—	—	—	—	—	—	—
2025–26	Bridgeport Islanders	AHL	2	2	0	0	120	3	0	1.50	.939	—	—	—	—	—	—	—	—
NHL totals			621	289	232	71	35,629	1,572	41	2.65	.916	65	32	30	3,859	157	4	2.44	.918

=== International ===
Year	Team	Event	Results	GP	W	L	T	MIN	GA	SO	GAA	SV%
2005	Russia	U18	5th	4	3	1	0	180	10	1	3.34	.904
2005	Russia	IH18	4th	4	—	—	—	—	—	—	2.64	.911
2006	Russia	U18	5th	5	3	2	0	298	14	1	2.82	.921
2006	Russia	WJC	2nd place, silver medalist(s)	1	1	0	0	60	1	0	1.00	.950
2007	Russia	WJC	2nd place, silver medalist(s)	6	5	1	0	358	9	2	1.51	.934
2010	Russia	WC	2nd place, silver medalist(s)	5	4	1	0	298	7	1	1.41	.951
2012	Russia	WC	1st place, gold medalist(s)	8	8	0	0	440	13	1	1.77	.939
2013	Russia	WC	6th	4	2	1	0	201	12	0	3.59	.878
2014	Russia	OG	5th	3	1	1	0	152	5	1	1.98	.910
Junior totals				20	—	—	—	—	—	—	—	—
Senior totals				20	15	3	0	1091	37	3	1.98	.930

Awards and achievements
Preceded by Nicklas Bäckström	Washington Capitals first-round draft pick 2006	Succeeded by Karl Alzner
