= Yaroslav Khabarov =

Russian ice hockey player

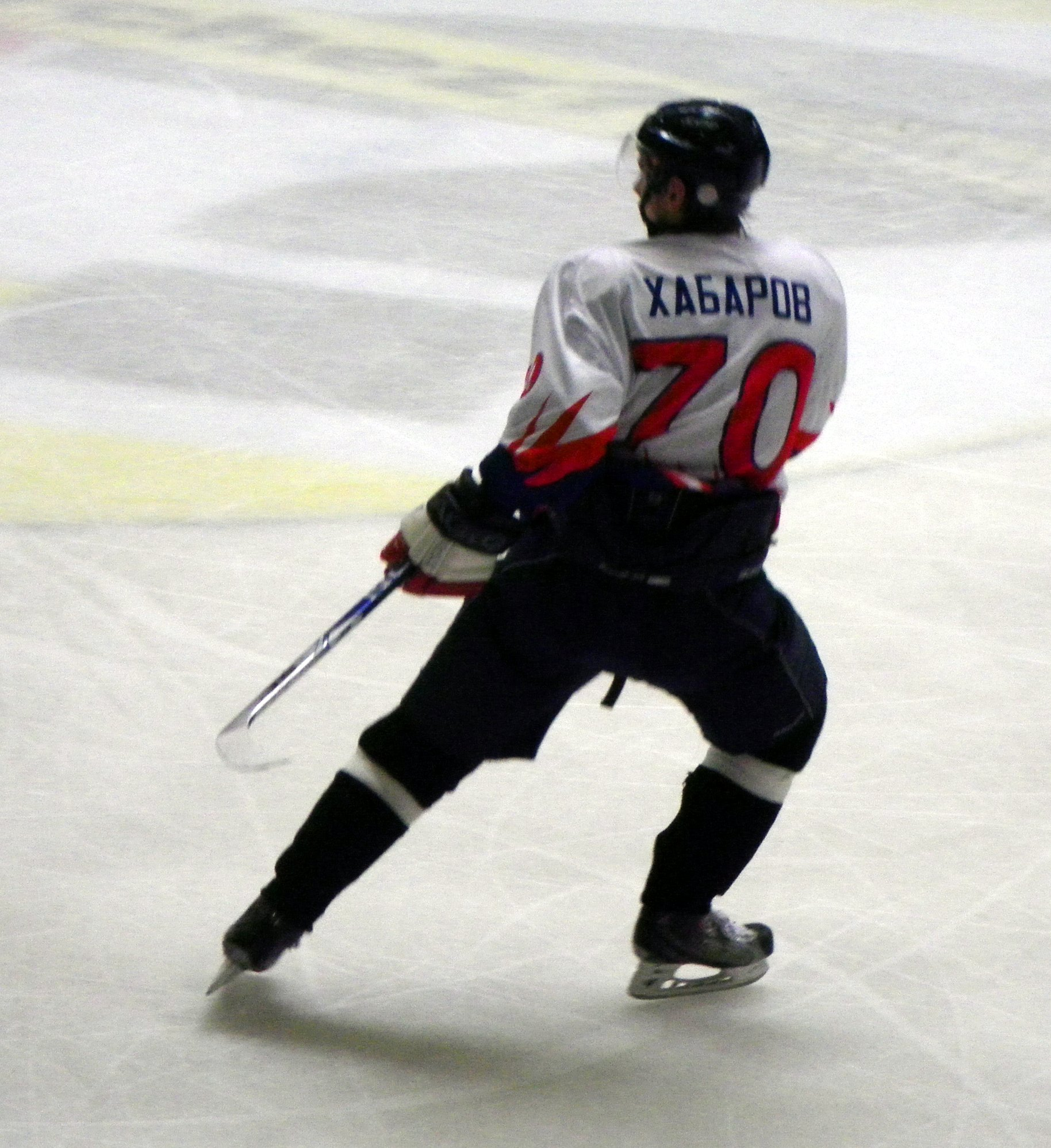
- Born: March 5, 1989 (age 36) Magnitogorsk, Russia
- Height: 6 ft 2 in (188 cm)
- Weight: 198 lb (90 kg; 14 st 2 lb)
- Position: Defence
- Shot: Left
- Played for: Metallurg Magnitogorsk; Amur Khabarovsk; Sibir Novosibirsk
- Playing career: 2006–2023

Yaroslav Khabarov (born March 5, 1989) is a Russian former professional ice hockey defenceman who is serving as an assistant coach for Metallurg Magnitogorsk of the Kontinental Hockey League (KHL). He has previously professionally played for Magnitogorsk, Amur Khabarovsk and HC Sibir Novosibirsk of the KHL. On March 3, 2014, Khabarov continued his first stint with Magnitogorsk, in agreeing to a two-year contract extension through 2016.

Following the conclusion of the 2022–23 season, Khabarov announced his retirement from professional hockey after 19 professional seasons, on 1 May 2023, and accepted a role to continue within Metallurg Magnitogorsk organization as an assistant coach.

== Career statistics ==
| | | | Regular season | | | | | Playoffs |
| Season | Team | League | GP | G | A | Pts | PIM | GP | G | A | Pts | PIM |
|---|---|---|---|---|---|---|---|---|---|---|---|---|
| 2005–06 | Metallurg Magnitogorsk-2 | RUS-3 | 12 | 0 | 1 | 1 | 12 | — | — | — | — | — |
| 2006–07 | Metallurg Magnitogorsk-2 | RUS-3 | 23 | 2 | 1 | 3 | 26 | — | — | — | — | — |
| 2007–08 | Metallurg Magnitogorsk-2 | RUS-3 | 55 | 11 | 18 | 29 | 122 | — | — | — | — | — |
| 2008–09 | Metallurg Magnitogorsk-2 | RUS-3 | 35 | 4 | 11 | 15 | 104 | — | — | — | — | — |
| 2008–09 | Metallurg Magnitogorsk | KHL | 9 | 0 | 0 | 0 | 14 | 3 | 0 | 0 | 0 | 0 |
| 2009–10 | Stalnye Lisy | MHL | 54 | 6 | 19 | 25 | 129 | 15 | 1 | 4 | 5 | 20 |
| 2010–11 | Stalnye Lisy | MHL | 6 | 0 | 4 | 4 | 4 | 12 | 0 | 1 | 1 | 30 |
| 2010–11 | Metallurg Magnitogorsk | KHL | 32 | 0 | 6 | 6 | 24 | — | — | — | — | — |
| 2011–12 | Metallurg Magnitogorsk | KHL | 13 | 1 | 3 | 4 | 8 | 2 | 0 | 0 | 0 | 4 |
| 2012–13 | Metallurg Magnitogorsk | KHL | 48 | 0 | 3 | 3 | 38 | 7 | 0 | 2 | 2 | 6 |
| 2013–14 | Metallurg Magnitogorsk | KHL | 54 | 4 | 7 | 11 | 77 | 21 | 2 | 3 | 5 | 16 |
| 2014–15 | Metallurg Magnitogorsk | KHL | 56 | 1 | 2 | 3 | 55 | 10 | 0 | 0 | 0 | 18 |
| 2015–16 | Metallurg Magnitogorsk | KHL | 57 | 1 | 6 | 7 | 50 | 19 | 0 | 1 | 1 | 10 |
| 2016–17 | Metallurg Magnitogorsk | KHL | 51 | 1 | 3 | 4 | 32 | 18 | 0 | 4 | 4 | 10 |
| 2017–18 | Metallurg Magnitogorsk | KHL | 20 | 1 | 3 | 4 | 14 | — | — | — | — | — |
| 2017–18 | Amur Khabarovsk | KHL | 27 | 0 | 5 | 5 | 12 | 5 | 0 | 0 | 0 | 6 |
| 2019–20 | Sibir Novosibirsk | KHL | 45 | 1 | 2 | 3 | 32 | 4 | 0 | 0 | 0 | 0 |
| 2020–21 | Sibir Novosibirsk | KHL | 31 | 2 | 1 | 3 | 20 | — | — | — | — | — |
| 2021–22 | Metallurg Magnitogorsk | KHL | 19 | 0 | 1 | 1 | 0 | 16 | 1 | 3 | 4 | 8 |
| 2022–23 | Metallurg Magnitogorsk | KHL | 27 | 0 | 7 | 7 | 10 | 1 | 0 | 0 | 0 | 0 |
| KHL totals | | | 489 | 12 | 49 | 61 | 386 | 106 | 4 | 12 | 16 | 78 |

== Awards and honors ==
| Award | Year |
|---|---|
KHL
| Gagarin Cup (Metallurg Magnitogorsk) | 2014, 2016 |
