= 2009 Karjala Tournament =

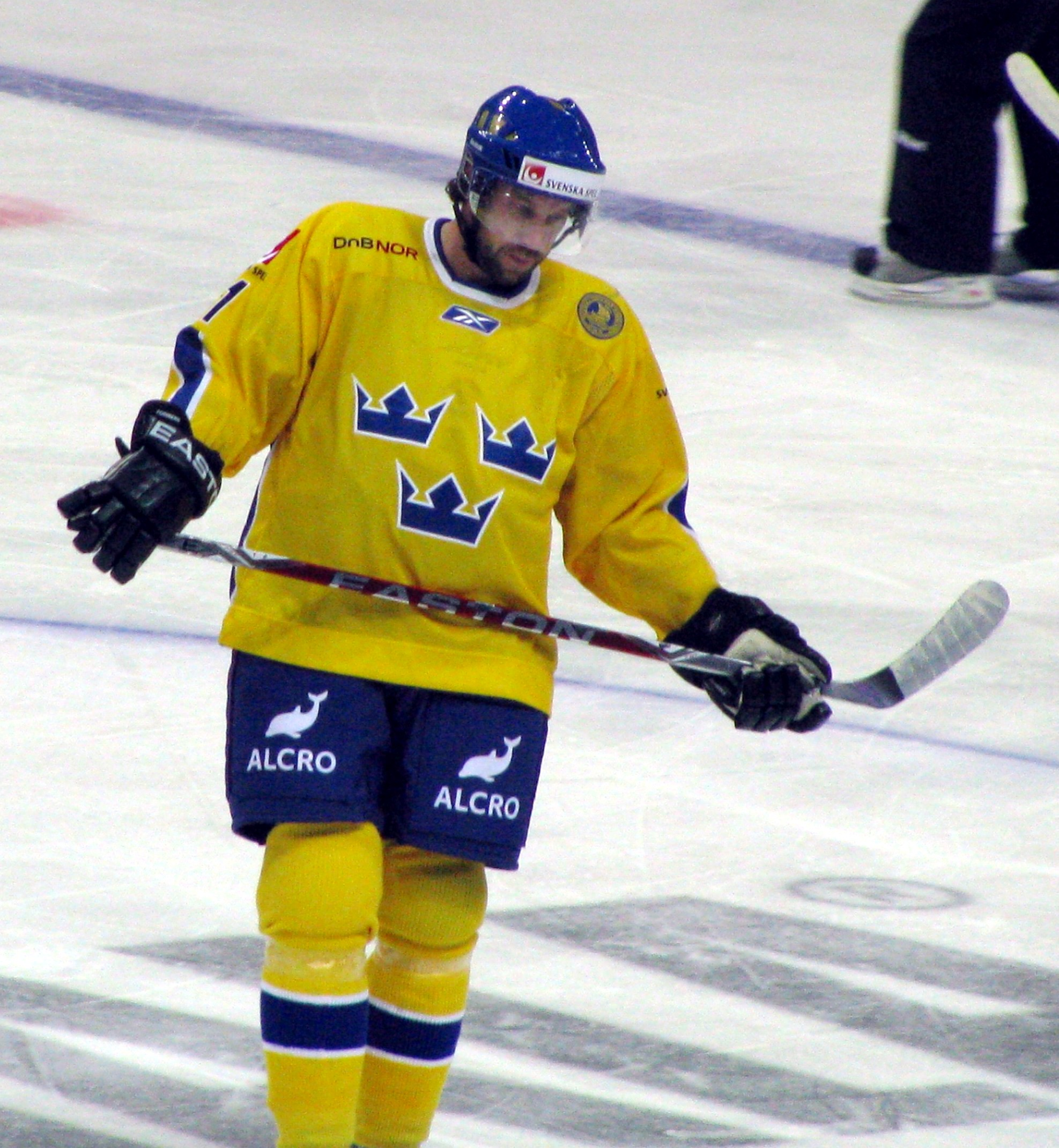
- Peter Forsberg representing team Sweden in the 2009 tournament

Tournament details
- Host countries: Finland; Sweden
- Cities: Helsinki; Jönköping
- Venues: 2 (in 2 host cities)
- Dates: 5–8 November 2009
- Teams: 4

Final positions
- Champions: Russia (5th title)
- Runners-up: Finland
- Third place: Sweden
- Fourth place: Czech Republic

Tournament statistics
- Games played: 6
- Goals scored: 39 (6.5 per game)
- Attendance: 49,230 (8,205 per game)
- Scoring leader: (Finland) Jarkko Immonen (5 points)

The 2009 Karjala Tournament was played between 5 and 8 November 2009. The Czech Republic, Finland, Sweden and Russia played a round-robin for a total of three games per team and six games in total. Five of the matches were played in the Helsinki Halli in Helsinki, Finland, and one match in the Kinnarps Arena in Jönköping, Sweden. The tournament was part of the 2009–10 Euro Hockey Tour.

Russia won the tournament for a fourth consecutive year, followed by Finland and Sweden.

== Standings ==
Pos	Team	Pld	W	OTW	SOW	OTL	SOL	L	GF	GA	GD	Pts
1	Russia	3	1	1	1	0	0	0	12	7	+5	7
2	Finland	3	2	0	0	0	1	0	12	5	+7	7
3	Sweden	3	1	0	0	0	0	2	5	14	−9	3
4	Czech Republic	3	0	0	0	1	0	2	7	10	−3	1

Source: eurohockey

== Games ==
All times are local. Helsinki – (Eastern European Time – UTC+2) Jönköping – (Central European Time – UTC+1)

5 November 2009; 19:00	Sweden	4-3 (1-1, 3-0, 0-2)	Czech Republic	Kinnarps Arena, Jönköping; Attendance: 5,403

Game reference

Stefan Liv
Goalies
Lukas Mensator
Referees:
(Russia) Rafael Kadyrov
(Russia) Vyacheslav Bulanov
Linesmen:
(Sweden) Jimmy Dahmén
(Sweden) Tommy Kählin

	0-1	04:14 – Jaroslav Bednar (Roman Cervenka, Tomas Rolinek)
11:13 – Niklas Nordgren (Marcus Nilson, Christian Berglund)	1-1
25:35 – Marcus Nilson (Magnus Johansson, Stefan Liv) (PP)	2-1
28:00 – Mattias Weinhandl (Johan Davidsson, Martin Thörnberg)	3-1
28:59 – Daniel Widing (Linus Omark)	4-1
	4-2	41:24 – Jaroslav Bednar (Roman Cervenka)
	4-3	56:59 – Marek Kvapil (Petr Hubacek, Josef Vasicek)

6 min
Penalties
6 min

5 November 2009; 18:30	Russia	4-3 GWS (0-3, 1-0, 2-0) (OT: 0–0) (SO: 1–0)	Finland	Helsinki Halli, Helsinki; Attendance: 10,440

Game reference

Vassili Koshechkin
Goalies
Petri Vehanen
Referees:
(Sweden) Christer Lärking
(Sweden) Marcus Vinnerborg
Linesmen:
(Finland) Jussi Terho
(Finland) Mika Tervo

26:26 – Oleg Saprykin (Sergei Zinoviev, Vitali Atyushov) (PP)	1-0
43:46 – Danis Zaripov (Aleksei Tereshchenko, Vitali Atyushov)	2-0
58:50 – Aleksei Morozov (Danis Zaripov, Aleksei Tereshchenko)	3-0
	3-1	02:59 – Marko Anttila (Leo Komarov)
	3-2	05:01 – Jarkko Immonen (Marko Anttila)
	3-3	07:52 – Jarkko Immonen (Markus Seikola) (PP)

Zaripov (miss)
Mozyakin
Morozov
Shootout
Voutilainen (miss)
Kerman (miss)
Immonen
8 min
Penalties
8 min
38
Shots
42

7 November 2009; 13:00	Sweden	1-4 (1-2, 0-0, 0-2)	Russia	Helsinki Halli, Helsinki; Attendance: 6,723

Game reference

Mikael Tellqvist
Goalies
Georgi Gelashvili
Referees:
(Finland) Sami Partanen
(Finland) Jyri Petteri Rönn
Linesmen:
(Finland) Jouni Saukkonen
(Finland) Hannu Sormunen

	0-1	05:24 – Sergei Zinoviev (Aleksandr Radulov, Aleksandr Galimov)
07:24 – Martin Thörnberg (Johan Åkerman)	1-1
	1-2	11:37 – Danis Zaripov (Aleksei Morozov, Aleksei Tereshchenko)
	1-3	41:44 – Sergei Zinoviev (Oleg Saprykin, Vitali Proshkin)
	1-4	44:32 – Sergei Mozyakin (Maksim Sushinsky) (PP)

20 min
Penalties
10 min
29
Shots
34

7 November 2009; 19:30	Finland	2-1 (1-1, 0-0, 1-0)	Czech Republic	Helsinki Halli, Helsinki; Attendance: 11,562

Game reference

Iiro Tarkki
Goalies
Marek Schwarz
Referees:
(Sweden) Marcus Vinnerborg
(Sweden) Christer Lärking
Linesmen:
(Finland) Masi Puolakka
(Finland) Mika Tervo

8:49 – Mikko Mäenpää	1-0
	1-1	00:57 - Jaroslav Bednar
44:38 – Tony Salmelainen	2-1

6 min
Penalties
6 min

8 November 2009; 13:00	Czech Republic	3-4 OT (2-0, 0-2, 1-1) (OT: 0–1)	Russia	Helsinki Halli, Helsinki; Attendance: 4,201

Game reference

Marek Schwarz
Goalies
Vassili Koshechkin
Referees:
(Finland) Tom Laaksonen
(Finland) Jari Levonen
Linesmen:
(Finland) Antti Orelma
(Finland) Sakari Suominen

05:34 – Jan Bulis (Pavel Brendl)	1-0
08:03 – Pavel Brendl (Jan Bulis)	2-0
	2-1	25:45 – Oleg Saprykin (Maksim Sushinsky, Vitali Proshkin)
	2-2	33:59 – Sergei Mozyakin (Dmitri Kalinin)
	2-3	47:02 – Danis Zaripov (Ilya Nikulin, Aleksei Morozov) (PP)
55:37 – Jaroslav Bednar (Roman Cervenka, Karel Rachunek) (PP)	3-3
	3-4	62:17 – Aleksei Morozov (Ilya Nikulin)

32 min
Penalties
22 min
34
Shots
32

8 November 2009; 16:30	Finland	7-0 (2-0, 5-0, 0-0)	Sweden	Helsinki Halli, Helsinki; Attendance: 10,901

Game reference

Petri Vehanen
Goalies
[[]] Mikael Tellqvist
Referees:
(Czech Republic) Martin Frano
(Czech Republic) Antonin Jerabek
Linesmen:
(Finland) Stefan Fonselius
(Finland) Juha Suoraniemi

05:07 – Jarkko Immonen (Jan Latvala, Ville Peltonen)	1-0
07:41 – Jukka Voutilainen (Ville Peltonen, Markus Seikola)	2-0
26:08 – Ville Peltonen (Niko Kapanen) (PP)	3-0
34:17 – Janne Niskala (PP)	4-0
36:26 – Antti Pihlström (Pasi Puistola, Petri Kontiola)	5-0
37:29 – Ville Peltonen (Markus Seikola, Jukka Voutilainen) (PP)	6-0
39:47 – Jarkko Immonen (Ville Peltonen, Janne Niskala) (PP)	7-0

18 min
Penalties
18 min
37
Shots
27

== Scoring leaders ==
Pos	Player	Country	GP	G	A	Pts	+/−	PIM	POS
1	Jarkko Immonen	Finland	3	4	1	5	+3	0	CE
2	Alexei Morozov	Russia	3	3	2	5	+2	2	RW
3	Ville Peltonen	Finland	3	2	3	5	+3	0	LW
4	Jaroslav Bednář	Czech Republic	3	4	0	4	+3	0	RW
5	Danis Zaripov	Russia	3	3	1	4	+3	0	LW

GP = Games played; G = Goals; A = Assists; Pts = Points; +/− = Plus/minus; PIM = Penalties in minutes; POS = Position
Source: swehockey

== Goaltending leaders ==
Pos	Player	Country	TOI	GA	GAA	Sv%	SO
1	Petri Vehanen	Finland	125:01	4	1.92	93.94	1
2	Vasily Koshechkin	Russia	127:17	6	2.83	92.11	0
3	Mikael Tellqvist	Sweden	80:00	4	3.00	90.48'	0
4	Marek Schwarz	Czech Republic	121:26	6	2.96	89.66	0
5	Stefan Liv	Sweden	100:00	10	6.00	84.38	0

TOI = Time on ice (minutes:seconds); SA = Shots against; GA = Goals against; GAA = Goals Against Average; Sv% = Save percentage; SO = Shutouts
Source: swehockey

== Tournament awards ==
The tournament directorate named the following players in the tournament 2009:

- Best goalkeeper: (Finland) Petri Vehanen
- Best defenceman: (Finland) Lasse Kukkonen
- Best forward: (Russia) Aleksei Morozov

Media All-Star Team:

- Goaltender: (Finland) Petri Vehanen
- Defence: (Finland) Mikko Mäenpää, (Russia) Vitali Proshkin
- Forwards: (Russia) Danis Zaripov, (Finland) Jarkko Immonen, (Russia) Aleksei Morozov
