= Kirill Knyazev =

Russian ice hockey player

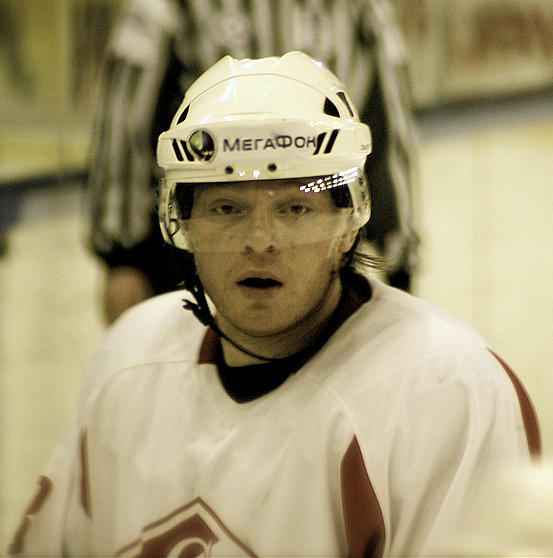
- Born: June 9, 1983 (age 42) Izhevsk, Soviet Union
- Height: 6 ft 1 in (185 cm)
- Weight: 196 lb (89 kg; 14 st 0 lb)
- Position: Left wing
- Shot: Left
- Played for: Salavat Yulaev Ufa; Yunost Minsk; Spartak Moscow; Ak Bars Kazan; Neftekhimik Nizhnekamsk; Dynamo Moscow; HC Ugra; Torpedo Nizhny Novgorod; Avtomobilist Yekaterinburg; Izhstal Izhevsk
- Playing career: 2005–2018

Kirill Leonidovich Knyazev (Russian: Кирилл Леонидович Князев; born June 9, 1983) is a Russian former professional ice hockey player. He last currently played for Izhstal Izhevsk in the Supreme Hockey League (VHL). He is a veteran of 331 games in the Kontinental Hockey League (KHL) spanning 7 clubs.

He briefly served as Sports Manager for Metallurg Novokuznetsk between February 14th, 2020 and March 30th, 2020.

== Awards and trophies ==
- September 2009: KHL forward of the month
