= Petri Vehanen =

Finnish ice hockey player

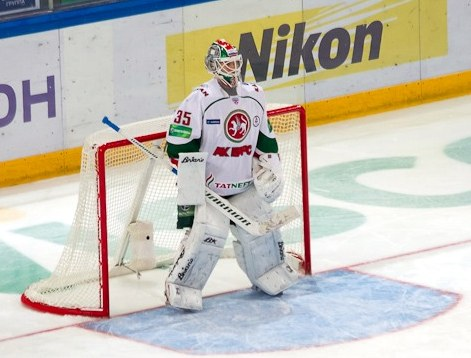
- Born: 9 October 1977 (age 47); Rauma, Finland
- Height: 6 ft 1 in (185 cm)
- Weight: 180 lb (82 kg; 12 st 12 lb)
- Position: Goaltender
- Caught: Left
- Played for: Lukko; Viking Hockey; HC Val Pusteria Wolves; Mora IK; HC Neftekhimik Nizhnekamsk; Ak Bars Kazan; HC Lev Praha; Eisbären Berlin
- National team: Finland
- Playing career: 1995–2018

Petri Vehanen (born 9 October 1977 in Rauma, Finland) is a retired Finnish professional ice hockey goaltender. During his career, he played for clubs in his native Finland, Italy, Norway, Sweden, Russia, Czech Republic and Germany. He won the World Championship with the Finnish national team in 2011.

== Playing career ==
=== Liiga ===
Vehanen has played his entire SM-liiga career for Lukko which is his hometown team. Vehanen has established himself as the starting goaltender for Lukko and played a solid season in 2007-08 season, earning himself a spot at the Finnish National Team roster. In the 2009 Karjala Tournament he was selected as the best goaltender.

Vehanen also has played for Mestis teams Jääkotkat and FPS.

=== Europe ===
Vehanen has played in Europe for HC Neftekhimik Nizhnekamsk of Russia, Viking Hockey of Norway, where he was voted best goaltender, HC Val Pusterial Wolves in Italy and Mora IK in Sweden. Midway through the 2009-10 season, he joined the Kontinental Hockey League with Ak Bars Kazan, he made an immediate impact to help Kazan claim the Gagarin Cup, compiling the best Goals against average, save percentage and selected as the league's best goaltender.

After three seasons with Ak Bars, Vehanen returned to Lukko for a solitary season before again resuming his career in the KHL with HC Lev Praha. Vehanen took Praha to their maiden Gagarin Cup finals in the 2013-14 season, before the club disbanded.

On 20 July 2014 Vehanen opted to sign with German club, Eisbären Berlin of the Deutsche Eishockey Liga (DEL), on a one-year contract. He eventually stayed until the conclusion of the 2017–18 season. He announced his retirement in late April 2018 shortly after falling short in the DEL finals.

== International Play ==
Medal record

Representing Finland

Ice hockey

World Championships
Gold medal – first place	2011 Slovakia	
Bronze medal – third place	2008 Canada	

Vehanen played in his first International tournament in 2008, when he was selected to Finnish national team to play in 2008 Ice Hockey World Championships. Vehanen's World Championship debut came when he played against Norway which Finland won 3-2 after overtime. In 2011 Ice Hockey World Championships Finland won gold with Vehanen as a starting goaltender. In the final game Vehanen made 32 saves leading his team to a 6-1 win against Sweden.

== Awards ==
- Deutsche Eishockey Liga (DEL) Runners-up in 2017–18
- KHL Runner-up in 2013-14
- Won the Gagarin Cup in 2009-10
- KHL best goalkeeper in 2009–10
- Karjala Tournament Best Goaltender in 2009
- Karjala Tournament All-Star team in 2009
- GET-ligaen All-Star team in 1998-99
