= Alexei Tsvetkov (ice hockey) =

Russian ice hockey player

- Born: August 28, 1981 (age 44) Rybinsk, Russia
- Height: 5 ft 9 in (175 cm)
- Weight: 185 lb (84 kg; 13 st 3 lb)
- Position: Centre
- Shot: Left
- Played for: Severstal Cherepovets; SKA Saint Petersburg; Salavat Yulaev; HC MVD; Dynamo Moscow; HC Sochi
- NHL draft: Undrafted
- Playing career: 1999–2018

Alexei Tsvetkov (born August 28, 1981) is a Russian ice hockey executive and former professional ice hockey forward who is currently the president of Polyot Rybinsk in the National Junior Hockey League.

== Career ==
Tsvetkov most recently played for HC Sochi in the Kontinental Hockey League (KHL). He previously played four seasons for HC Dynamo Moscow of the KHL. Tsvetkov joined Sochi as a free agent, signing a one-year deal on July 12, 2017.

In July 2019, Tsvetkov announced his retirement from professional hockey.
