= Kremenki =

Kremenki (Russian: Кременки) or Kremyonki (Кремёнки) is the name of several inhabited localities in Russia.

Urban localities

- Kremyonki, Kaluga Oblast, a town in Zhukovsky District of Kaluga Oblast

Rural localities

- Kremenki, Dalnekonstantinovsky District, Nizhny Novgorod Oblast, a village in Nizhegorodsky Selsoviet of Dalnekonstantinovsky District of Nizhny Novgorod Oblast
- Kremenki, Diveyevsky District, Nizhny Novgorod Oblast, a selo in Diveyevsky Selsoviet of Diveyevsky District of Nizhny Novgorod Oblast
- Kremenki, Lyskovsky District, Nizhny Novgorod Oblast, a village in Barminsky Selsoviet of Lyskovsky District of Nizhny Novgorod Oblast
- Kremenki, Ulyanovsk Oblast, a selo in Pribrezhnensky Rural Okrug of Staromaynsky District of Ulyanovsk Oblast
