= Maxim Soloviev =

Russian ice hockey player

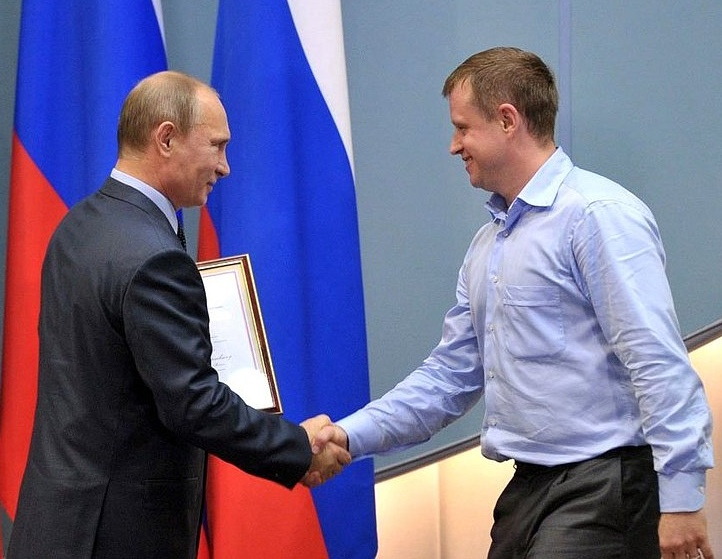
- Vladimir Putin and Maxim Soloviev in 2013
- Born: 20 February 1979 (age 46) Moscow, Russia
- Height: 5 ft 10 in (178 cm)
- Weight: 187 lb (85 kg; 13 st 5 lb)
- Position: Defence
- Shot: Right
- Played for: CSKA Moscow; Metallurg Novokuznetsk; Vityaz Podolsk; HC MVD; Dynamo Moscow
- Playing career: 1997–2018

Maxim Soloviev (born 20 February 1979) is a Russian former professional ice hockey defenceman. He last played with HC Dynamo Moscow in the Kontinental Hockey League (KHL).

After completing his eighth season with Dynamo following the 2017–18 campaign, Soloviev announced his retirement from his 21-year professional career on September 7, 2018. He later accepted an assistant coaching role into the following season with HC Spartak Moscow on October 19, 2018.
