= Ivan Kasutin =

Russian ice hockey player

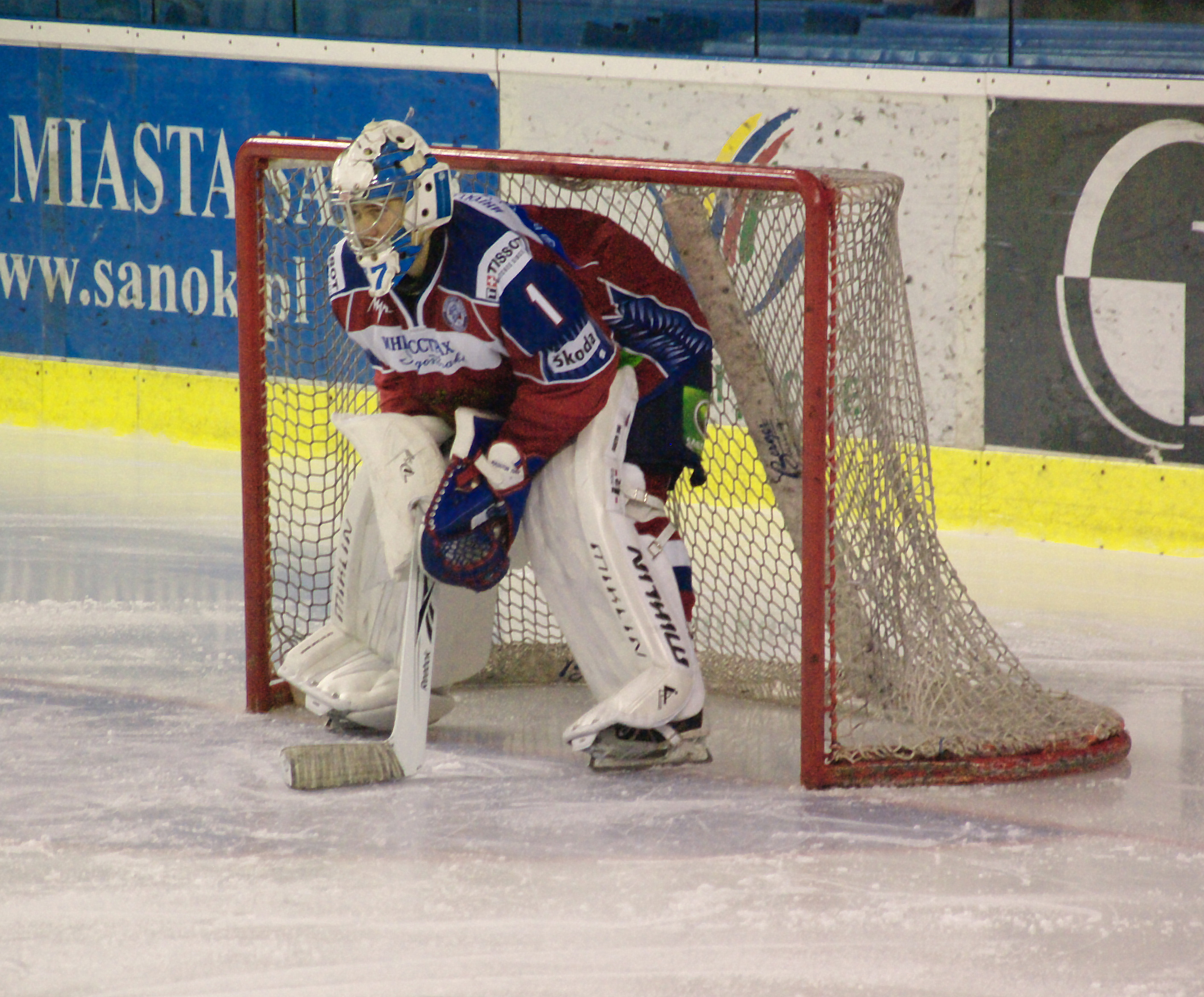
- Born: October 17, 1986 (age 38); Vologda, USSR
- Height: 6 ft 0 in (183 cm)
- Weight: 183 lb (83 kg; 13 st 1 lb)
- Position: Goaltender
- Catches: Right
- VHL team Former teams: Metallurg Novokuznetsk; CSKA Moscow; Neftekhimik Nizhnekamsk; Spartak Moscow; Ak Bars Kazan; HC Vityaz; SKA Saint Petersburg; Severstal Cherepovets; Torpedo Nizhny Novgorod; HC Lada Togliatti
- Playing career: 2005–present

Ivan Kasutin (born October 17, 1986) is a Russian professional ice hockey goaltender who currently plays for Metallurg Novokuznetsk in the Supreme Hockey League (VHL). He has previously played as a journeyman with nine clubs within the Kontinental Hockey League (KHL).
